= 2018 Tulsa Golden Hurricane football team =

American college football season

2018 Tulsa Golden Hurricane football
- Conference: American Athletic Conference
- West Division
- Record: 3–9 (2–6 AAC)
- Head coach: Philip Montgomery (4th season)
- Offensive scheme: Veer and shoot
- Defensive coordinator: Bill Young (6th season)
- Base defense: 4–3
- Home stadium: Skelly Field at H. A. Chapman Stadium

2018 American Athletic Conference football standings
	Conf.			Overall
Team	W		L	W		L
East Division
No. 11 UCF x$	8	–	0	12	–	1
Temple	7	–	1	8	–	5
No. 24 Cincinnati	6	–	2	11	–	2
South Florida	3	–	5	7	–	6
East Carolina	1	–	7	3	–	9
UConn	0	–	8	1	–	11
West Division
Memphis xy	5	–	3	8	–	6
Houston x	5	–	3	8	–	5
Tulane x	5	–	3	7	–	6
SMU	4	–	4	5	–	7
Navy	2	–	6	3	–	10
Tulsa	2	–	6	3	–	9
Championship: UCF 56, Memphis 41
$ – Conference champion; x – Division champion/co-champions; y – Championship game participant; Rankings from AP Poll

The 2018 Tulsa Golden Hurricane football team represented the University of Tulsa in the 2018 NCAA Division I FBS football season. The Golden Hurricane played their home games at the Skelly Field at H. A. Chapman Stadium in Tulsa, Oklahoma, and competed in the West Division of the American Athletic Conference. They were led by fourth-year head coach Philip Montgomery. They finished the season 3–9, 2–6 in American Athletic play to finish in a tie for fifth place in the West Division.

== Preseason ==
=== Award watch lists ===
Listed in the order that they were released

Award	Player	Position	Year
Rimington Trophy	Chandler Miller	C	SR
Fred Biletnikoff Award	Justin Hobbs	WR	SR
Bronko Nagurski Trophy	Cooper Edmiston	LB	JR
Outland Trophy	Tyler Bowling	G	SR
Outland Trophy	Chandler Miller	C	SR
Wuerffel Trophy	Willie Wright	OL	SR

=== AAC media poll ===
The AAC media poll was released on July 24, 2018, with the Golden Hurricane predicted to finish in last place in the AAC West Division.

Media poll (West)
Predicted finish	Team	Votes (1st place)
1	Memphis	171 (23)
2	Houston	146 (4)
3	Navy	129 (3)
4	SMU	72
5	Tulane	68
6	Tulsa	44

== Schedule ==
Date	Time	Opponent	Site	TV	Result	Attendance
September 1	6:00 p.m.	No. 16 (FCS) Central Arkansas*	Skelly Field at H. A. Chapman Stadium; Tulsa, OK	ESPN3	W 38–27	18,356
September 8	7:00 p.m.	at Texas*	Darrell K Royal–Texas Memorial Stadium; Austin, TX	LHN	L 21–28	90,563
September 15	6:00 p.m.	Arkansas State*	Skelly Field at H. A. Chapman Stadium; Tulsa, OK	CBSSN	L 20–29	17,349
September 20	6:30 p.m.	at Temple	Lincoln Financial Field; Philadelphia, PA	ESPN	L 17–31	24,217
October 4	7:00 p.m.	at Houston	TDECU Stadium; Houston, TX	ESPN	L 26–41	29,823
October 12	6:00 p.m.	No. 23 South Florida	Skelly Field at H. A. Chapman Stadium; Tulsa, OK	ESPN	L 24–25	16,142
October 20	11:00 a.m.	at Arkansas*	Donald W. Reynolds Razorback Stadium; Fayetteville, AR	SECN	L 0–23	56,691
October 27	6:00 p.m.	Tulane	Skelly Field at H. A. Chapman Stadium; Tulsa, OK	ESPNU	L 17–24	16,133
November 3	6:00 p.m.	UConn	Skelly Field at H. A. Chapman Stadium; Tulsa, OK	CBSSN	W 49–19	17,451
November 10	11:00 a.m.	at Memphis	Liberty Bowl Memorial Stadium; Memphis, TN	ESPNU	L 21–47	27,905
November 17	2:30 p.m.	at Navy	Navy–Marine Corps Memorial Stadium; Annapolis, MD	CBSSN	L 29–37	31,517
November 24	2:30 p.m.	SMU	Skelly Field at H. A. Chapman Stadium; Tulsa, OK	CBSSN	W 27–24	17,159
*Non-conference game; Rankings from AP Poll released prior to the game; All times are in Central time

== Game summaries ==
=== Central Arkansas ===
	1	2	3	4	Total
No. 16 (FCS) Bears	13	0	7	7	27
Golden Hurricane	7	14	3	14	38

=== At Texas ===
	1	2	3	4	Total
Golden Hurricane	0	0	7	14	21
Longhorns	14	7	0	7	28

=== Arkansas State ===
	1	2	3	4	Total
Red Wolves	3	10	14	2	29
Golden Hurricane	7	0	3	10	20

=== At Temple ===
	1	2	3	4	Total
Golden Hurricane	7	3	0	7	17
Owls	7	14	7	3	31

=== At Houston ===
	1	2	3	4	Total
Golden Hurricane	13	0	10	3	26
Cougars	7	10	0	24	41

=== South Florida ===
	1	2	3	4	Total
No. 23 Bulls	3	0	7	15	25
Golden Hurricane	7	3	14	0	24

=== At Arkansas ===
	1	2	3	4	Total
Golden Hurricane	0	0	0	0	0
Razorbacks	0	10	10	3	23

=== Tulane ===
	1	2	3	4	Total
Green Wave	0	7	7	10	24
Golden Hurricane	3	7	7	0	17

=== UConn ===
	1	2	3	4	Total
Huskies	10	3	0	6	19
Golden Hurricane	0	28	21	0	49

=== At Memphis ===
	1	2	3	4	Total
Golden Hurricane	0	0	14	7	21
Tigers	17	10	7	13	47

=== At Navy ===
	1	2	3	4	Total
Golden Hurricane	7	9	0	13	29
Midshipmen	7	20	3	7	37

=== SMU ===
	1	2	3	4	Total
Mustangs	0	7	7	10	24
Golden Hurricane	7	14	3	3	27

== Roster ==
2018 Tulsa Golden Hurricane football team roster
Players
Coaches
Offense

Pos.	#	Name	Class
WR	1	Josh Stewart	RSo
WR	2	Keylon Stokes	So
RB	3	Shamari Brooks	So
WR	4	Jarion Anderson	RJr
TE	6	Chris Minter	Sr
QB	7	Davis Brin	Fr
WR	8	Keenen Johnson	Jr
WR	9	Sam Crawford Jr.	RFr
QB	10	Chad President	RJr
QB	11	Zach Smith	Jr
QB	12	Seth Boomer	RFr
QB	13	Luke Skipper	RSo
QB	15	Brandon Marquardt	RFr
WR	16	Marquez Perez	Fr
QB	19	Will Hefley III	RJr
WR	20	Cannon Montgomery	RFr
RB	21	T.K. Wilkerson	Fr
RB	22	Javon Thomas	RJr
WR	23	Jordan Brown	RSo
RB	24	Corey Taylor II	RSo
TE	25	David Fitzwater	RSo
RB	26	Trey Hunter	Fr
RB	27	Elijah Lucas	Fr
WR	29	Justin Hobbs	RSr
TE	32	James Palmer	Fr
WR	33	Thomas Bingham	Sr
RB	34	Reed Martin	RFr
RB	35	Brandon Workman	Jr
TE	37	Tereance James	Jr
TE	38	Cole Neph	RSr
WR	41	Andrew McKinnis	RSo
TE	44	Jordan Rodriguez	So
C	55	Gerard Wheeler	RFr
OT	58	Willie Wright	RSr
OL	62	Jake Coleman	Fr
G	63	Judge Hartin	Jr
OT	65	Chris Ivy Jr.	RJr
G	67	Tristan Wyatt	RJr
G	68	Tiller Bucktrot	RSo
OL	69	Jackson Holbrook	Fr
G	70	Clay Greathouse	RSo
OT	71	Chris Paul	RFr
G	72	Tyler Bowling	RSr
C	73	Dylan Couch	RSo
C	74	Chandler Miller	RSr
G	75	Dante Bivens	RFr
OT	76	Waahid Muhammad	RSo
C	77	Josh Owens	Fr
OT	78	X'Zauvea Gadlin	Fr
WR	80	JuanCarlos Santana	RFr
WR	82	Joseph Breedlove III	RFr
WR	84	Avery Gragg	RJr
WR	85	Imiee Cooksey	Fr
TE	87	Dalton May	Fr
WR	88	Malik Jackson	RFr

Defense

Pos.	#	Name	Class
CB	1	Keanu Hill	RSr
S	3	Cristian Williams	RJr
LB	4	Robert Revels III	Jr
S	5	McKinley Whitfield	Sr
LB	6	Diamon Cannon	RJr
CB	7	Malik Welch	So
CB	8	Jabari James	Fr
CB	9	Reggie Robinson	RJr
S	10	Manny Bunch	Jr
CB	11	Keidrien Wadley	RJr
S	12	Allie Green IV	So
S	13	Jordan Mitchell	RSr
DE	15	Trevis Gipson	RJr
CB	16	Montray Norris	RSo
S	18	Sam Gottsch	RSr
LB	19	Grant Sawyer	Fr
S	20	Kendarin Ray	Fr
S	21	Bryson Powers	RFr
S	22	Marcus Mays	RFr
LB	23	Zaven Collins	RFr
LB	24	Treyvon Reeves	RSo
CB	26	Akayleb Evans	So
S	27	Daiquain Jackson	RFr
LB	28	TieNeal Martin	Jr
S	29	Brandon Johnson	Jr
LB	30	Justin Wright	Fr
LB	32	Hunter Kroesche	RFr
LB	35	Yohance Burnett	Jr
LB	40	Mitchell Kulkin	Fr
LB	41	Joseph Anderson	Fr
LB	42	Cooper Edmiston	Jr
LB	43	Andrew Jadick	RFr
DE	44	Cade Baumann	Jr
LB	46	Forrest Harrell III	RJr
DB	47	Jett Hendrix	Fr
LB	47	Blake Landon	RSo
LB	48	CJ Larry	Fr
LB	52	Thomas von Borstel	RJr
LB	53	Connor Kelley	Fr
DT	54	Shemarr Robinson	Jr
DT	55	Garrett Flanary	So
DE	57	Beau Wooden	RSo
DE	58	Deven Lamp	RFr
DT	71	Jacob Pugh	RSo
DT	89	Payton Prince	RSr
DT	90	Jaxon Player	Fr
DE	91	Cullen Wick	RSo
DT	93	JaJuan Blankenship	RSo
LB	94	Anthony Goodlow	Fr
DE	96	Myles Mouton	RSr
DT	97	Tyarise Stevenson	RSo

Special teams

Pos.	#	Name	Class
P	33	Thomas Bennett	RJr
LS	42	Adam Higuera	So
K	49	Tristan Lacey	RSr
K	90	Nathan Walker	RSr
K	94	John Parker Romo	So
K	95	Jacob Rainey	Fr
K	98	Kevin Neitzke	RSo

Head coach

- Philip Montgomery (Tarleton State)

Coordinators/assistant coaches

- Bill Young (Oklahoma State)
  Defensive coordinator, defensive line
- Jermial Ashley (Kansas)
  Defensive line coach
- Mike Bloesch (Houston)
  Offensive line coach
- Carlton Buckels (LSU)
  Safeties coach
- Aaron Fletcher (East Texas A&M)
  Cornerbacks coach
- Joseph Gillespie (Angelo State)
  Linebackers coach
- Justin Hill (Rice)
  Running backs coach
- Calvin Lowry (Penn State)
  Receivers coach
- Jordan Najvar (Baylor)
  Tight ends coach
- Beau Trahan (Texas)
  Quarterbacks coach
- Grant Lester
  Offensive quality control
- Luke Olson (Southern Nazarene)
  Defensive quality control
- Kyle Grooms (Tulsa)
  Director of football operations
- Reed Heim (Austin College)
  Director of high school relations & recruiting
- Ravi Savitala (UC Santa Cruz)
  Assistant director of high school relations & recruiting
- Dan Bitson (Tulsa)
  Director of player personnel & development
- Keith Smith (Shepherd University)
  Director of football video operations
- Tom Ososkie
  Director of scouting
- Steven Haunga (Arkansas State)
  Offensive analyst
- Josh Atkinson (Tulsa)
  Offensive graduate assistant
- Derrick Luetjen
  Defensive graduate assistant
- Craig Suits (Tulsa)
  Defensive intern

Legend

- (C) Team captain
- (S) Suspended
- (I) Ineligible
- Injured
- Redshirt

Roster
