= 2017 Tulsa Golden Hurricane football team =

American college football season

2017 Tulsa Golden Hurricane football
- Conference: American Athletic Conference
- West Division
- Record: 2–10 (1–7 AAC)
- Head coach: Philip Montgomery (3rd season)
- Offensive scheme: Veer and shoot
- Co-defensive coordinators: Brian Norwood (3rd season); Bill Young (5th season)
- Base defense: 4–3
- Home stadium: Skelly Field at H. A. Chapman Stadium

2017 American Athletic Conference football standings
	Conf.			Overall
Team	W		L	W		L
East Division
No. 6 UCF xy$	8	–	0	13	–	0
No. 21 South Florida	6	–	2	10	–	2
Temple	4	–	4	7	–	6
Cincinnati	2	–	6	4	–	8
UConn	2	–	6	3	–	9
East Carolina	2	–	6	3	–	9
West Division
No. 25 Memphis xy	7	–	1	10	–	3
Houston	5	–	3	7	–	5
Navy	4	–	4	7	–	6
SMU	4	–	4	7	–	6
Tulane	3	–	5	5	–	7
Tulsa	1	–	7	2	–	10
Championship: UCF 62, Memphis 55
$ – Conference champion; x – Division champion/co-champions; y – Championship game participant; As of January 9, 2018; Rankings from AP Poll.

The 2017 Tulsa Golden Hurricane football team represented the University of Tulsa in the 2017 NCAA Division I FBS football season. The Golden Hurricane played their home games at the Skelly Field at H. A. Chapman Stadium in Tulsa, Oklahoma, and competed in the West Division of the American Athletic Conference. They were led by third-year head coach Philip Montgomery. They finished the season 2–10, 1–7 in AAC play to finish in last place in the West Division.

== Schedule ==
Tulsa announced its 2017 football schedule on February 9, 2017. The 2017 schedule consists of 6 home and away games in the regular season. The Golden Hurricane will host AAC foes Houston, Memphis, Navy, and Temple, and will travel to UConn, SMU, South Florida, and Tulane.

The Golden Hurricane will host two of the four non-conference opponents, Louisiana from the Sun Belt Conference and New Mexico from the Mountain West Conference, and will travel to Oklahoma State from the Big 12 Conference and Toledo from the Mid-American Conference.

Date	Time	Opponent	Site	TV	Result	Attendance
August 31	6:30 p.m.	at No. 10 Oklahoma State*	Boone Pickens Stadium; Stillwater, OK (rivalry)	FS1	L 24–59	56,790
September 9	3:00 p.m.	Louisiana*	Skelly Field at H. A. Chapman Stadium; Tulsa, OK	ESPN3	W 66–42	17,758
September 16	6:00 p.m.	at Toledo*	Glass Bowl; Toledo, OH	ESPN3	L 51–54	24,239
September 23	12:30 p.m.	New Mexico*	Skelly Field at H. A. Chapman Stadium; Tulsa, OK	ESPN3	L 13–16	18,026
September 30	2:30 p.m.	Navy	Skelly Field at H. A. Chapman Stadium; Tulsa, OK	ESPNU	L 21–31	21,354
October 7	10:00 a.m.	at Tulane	Yulman Stadium; New Orleans, LA	ESPN3	L 28–62	11,971
October 14	2:45 p.m.	Houston^{†}	Skelly Field at H. A. Chapman Stadium; Tulsa, OK	ESPNews	W 45–17	19,198
October 21	11:00 a.m.	at UConn	Rentschler Field; East Hartford, CT	ESPNU	L 14–20	24,814
October 27	8:00 p.m.	at SMU	Gerald J. Ford Stadium; Dallas, TX	ESPN2	L 34–38	14,930
November 3	7:00 p.m.	No. 22 Memphis	Skelly Field at H. A. Chapman Stadium; Tulsa, OK	ESPN2	L 14–41	17,383
November 16	7:00 p.m.	at No. 23 South Florida	Raymond James Stadium; Tampa, FL	ESPN	L 20–27	26,195
November 25	4:00 p.m.	Temple	Skelly Field at H. A. Chapman Stadium; Tulsa, OK	ESPNews	L 22–43	17,032
*Non-conference game; ^{†}Homecoming; Rankings from AP Poll released prior to the game; All times are in Central time

== Game summaries ==
=== At Oklahoma State ===
Team	1	2	3	4	Total
Golden Hurricane	0	17	0	7	24
• No. 10 Cowboys	21	17	14	7	59

- TV announcers: Joe Davis, Brady Quinn, Bruce Feldman

Scoring summary
1	12:59	OSU	Tyron Johnson 44-yard pass from Mason Rudolph (Matt Ammendola kick)	OSU 7–0
1	6:35	OSU	James Washington 40-yard pass from Rudolph (Ammendola kick)	OSU 14–0
1	4:08	OSU	Justice Hill 3-yard run (Ammendola kick)	OSU 21–0
2	10:38	TU	Adam Higuera 0-yard fumble return (Redford Jones kick)	OSU 21–7
2	10:06	OSU	J.D. King 71-yard run (Ammendola kick)	OSU 28–7
2	6:18	TU	Corey Taylor II 3-yard run (Jones kick)	OSU 28–14
2	3:29	OSU	Ammendola 24-yard field goal	OSU 31–14
2	2:04	OSU	Washington 77-yard pass from Rudolph (Ammendola kick)	OSU 38–14
2	0:00	TU	Jones 23-yard field goal	OSU 38–17
3	6:37	OSU	Rudolph 1-yard run (Ammendola kick)	OSU 45–17
3	2:14	OSU	Kenneth Edison-McGruder 82-yard fumble return (Ammendola kick)	OSU 52–17
4	7:55	OSU	LD Brown 15-yard run (Ammendola kick)	OSU 59–17
4	5:35	TU	Taylor 55-yard run (Jones kick)	OSU 59–24

=== Louisiana ===
Team	1	2	3	4	Total
Ragin' Cajuns	10	13	12	7	42
• Golden Hurricane	10	28	7	21	66

- TV announcers: David Saltzman, George Wrighster

Scoring summary
1	12:02	TU	Redford Jones 46-yard field goal	TU 3–0
1	8:08	UL	Stevie Artigue 38-yard field goal	Tied 3–3
1	6:04	TU	D'Angelo Brewer 50-yard run (Jones kick)	TU 10–3
1	1:32	UL	Jordan Davis 1-yard run (Artigue kick)	Tied 10–10
2	11:35	TU	Chad President 5-yard run (Jones kick)	TU 17–10
2	9:09	UL	Elijah Mitchell 20-yard run (Artigue kick)	Tied 17–17
2	7:42	TU	Corey Taylor II 4-yard run (Jones kick)	TU 24–17
2	2:05	UL	Keenan Barnes 15-yard pass from Davis (Artigue kick failed)	TU 24–23
2	1:35	TU	Justin Hobbs 69-yard pass from President (Jones kick)	TU 31–23
2	0:06	TU	Taylor 1-yard run (Jones kick)	TU 38–23
3	13:11	UL	Mitchell 19-yard pass from Davis (Davis pass failed)	TU 38–29
3	7:06	UL	Davis 9-yard run (Calvin Linden kick failed)	TU 38–35
3	4:00	TU	Brewer 1-yard run (Jones kick)	TU 45–35
4	14:05	TU	Shamari Brooks 5-yard run (Jones kick)	TU 52–35
4	12:24	UL	Trey Ragas 15-yard run (Artigue kick)	TU 52–42
4	7:43	TU	Brewer 1-yard run (Jones kick)	TU 59–42
4	0:52	TU	President 2-yard run (Jones kick)	TU 66–42

=== At Toledo ===
Team	1	2	3	4	Total
Golden Hurricane	21	7	9	14	51
• Rockets	7	7	22	18	54

- TV announcers: Michael Reghi, Dustin Fox

Scoring summary
1	09:34	TU	Chad President 8-yard run (Redford Jones kick)	TU 7–0
1	09:23	UT	Danzel McKinley-Lewis 60-yard pass from Logan Woodside (Jameson Vest kick)	Tied 7–7
1	08:21	TU	Shamari Brooks 63-yard run (Jones kick)	TU 14–7
1	03:17	TU	Craig Suits 37-yard interception return (Jones kick)	TU 21–7
2	05:01	TU	Brooks 8-yard run (Jones kick)	TU 28–7
2	00:28	UT	Cody Thompson 26-yard pass from Woodside (Vest kick)	TU 28–14
3	14:05	UT	Terry Swanson 49-yard run (Vest kick)	TU 28–21
3	09:10	TU	Jones 25-yard field goal	TU 31–21
3	08:55	UT	Thompson 81-yard pass from Woodside (Vest kick)	TU 31–28
3	03:13	UT	Thompson 15-yard pass from Woodside (Vest kick failed)	UT 34–31
3	00:56	TU	D'Angelo Brewer 1-yard run (Jones kick blocked)	TU 37–34
3	00:56	UT	Josh Teachey defensive two-point conversion	TU 37–36
4	12:07	TU	President 39-yard run (Jones kick)	TU 44–36
4	10:18	UT	Diontae Johnson 49-yard pass from Woodside (Jordan Fisher pass)	Tied 44–44
4	08:04	UT	Johnson 74-yard pass from Woodside (Vest kick)	UT 51–44
4	02:47	TU	Brooks 1-yard run (Jones kick)	Tied 51–51
4	00:00	UT	Vest 33-yard field goal	UT 54–51

=== New Mexico ===
Team	1	2	3	4	Total
• Lobos	7	6	0	3	16
Golden Hurricane	3	7	0	3	13

- TV announcers: Joel Meyers, Brian Kinchen

Scoring summary
1	11:32	UNM	Coltin Gerhart 19-yard run (Jason Sanders kick)	UNM 7–0
1	07:45	TU	Redford Jones 50-yard field goal	UNM 7–3
2	13:57	UNM	Sanders 34-yard field goal	UNM 10–3
2	12:49	TU	D'Angelo Brewer 4-yard run (Jones kick)	Tied 10–10
2	08:08	UNM	Sanders 39-yard field goal	UNM 13–10
4	14:53	TU	Jones 26-yard field goal	Tied 13–13
4	00:00	UNM	Sanders 53-yard field goal	UNM 16–13

=== Navy ===
Team	1	2	3	4	Total
• Midshipmen	0	14	3	14	31
Golden Hurricane	14	0	0	7	21

- TV announcers: Mark Neely, Ray Bentley

Scoring summary
1	12:22	TU	D'Angelo Brewer 1-yard run (Redford Jones kick)	TU 7–0
1	00:32	TU	Chad President 1-yard run (Jones kick)	TU 14–0
2	04:19	NAVY	Zach Abey 1-yard run (Bennett Moehring kick)	TU 14–7
2	00:27	NAVY	Abey 3-yard run (Moehring kick)	Tied 14–14
3	01:23	NAVY	Moehring 24-yard field goal	NAVY 17–14
4	14:45	NAVY	Malcolm Perry 27-yard run (Moehring kick)	NAVY 24–14
4	08:47	NAVY	Abey 2-yard run (Moehring kick)	NAVY 31–14
4	07:01	TU	Chris Minter 4-yard pass from President (Jones kick)	NAVY 31–21

=== At Tulane ===
Team	1	2	3	4	Total
Golden Hurricane	7	0	14	7	28
• Green Wave	21	27	7	7	62

- TV announcers: Mark Neely, Ray Bentley

Scoring summary
1	12:31	TULANE	Dontrell Hilliard 1-yard run (Merek Glover kick)	TULANE 7–0
1	08:24	TULANE	Hilliard 23-yard run (Glover kick)	TULANE 14–0
1	07:45	TULANE	Terren Encalade 62-yard pass from Jonathan Banks (Glover kick)	TULANE 21–0
1	07:09	TULSA	Justin Hobbs 59-yard pass from Luke Skipper (Redford Jones kick)	TULANE 21–7
2	14:56	TULANE	Stephon Huderson 2-yard run (Glover kick)	TULANE 28–7
2	13:35	TULANE	Darius Bradwell 8-yard run (Glover kick)	TULANE 35–7
2	05:43	TULANE	Hilliard 17-yard run (Glover kick)	TULANE 42–7
2	00:05	TULANE	Banks 13-yard run (Glover kick failed)	TULANE 48–7
3	12:06	TULSA	Skipper 1-yard run (Jones kick)	TULANE 48–14
3	10:15	TULANE	Hilliard 43-yard run (Glover kick)	TULANE 55–14
3	03:21	TULSA	Shamari Brooks 13-yard run (Jones kick)	TULANE 55–21
4	11:18	TULANE	Johnathan Brantley 34-yard run (Glover kick)	TULANE 62–21
4	08:41	TULSA	Brooks 12-yard run (Jones kick)	TULANE 62–28

=== Houston ===
Team	1	2	3	4	Total
Cougars	3	7	0	7	17
• Golden Hurricane	0	7	17	21	45

- TV announcers: Joel Meyers, Al Groh

Scoring summary
1	00:49	UH	Caden Novikoff 26-yard field goal	UH 3–0
2	11:58	UH	Duke Catalon 1-yard run (Novikoff kick)	UH 10–0
2	04:34	TU	Chad President 1-yard run (Redford Jones kick)	UH 10–7
3	03:51	TU	Jones 23-yard field goal	Tied 10–10
3	02:48	TU	President 2-yard run (Jones kick)	TU 17–10
3	00:00	TU	D'Angelo Brewer 46-yard run (Jones kick)	TU 24–10
4	11:32	UH	Dillon Birden 24-yard run (Novikoff kick)	TU 24–17
4	09:52	TU	Keenen Johnson 70-yard pass from Luke Skipper (Jones kick)	TU 31–17
4	00:35	TU	Shamari Brooks 5-yard run (Jones kick)	TU 38–17
4	00:24	TU	Petera Wilson Jr. 3-yard fumble return (Jones kick)	TU 45–17

=== At UConn ===
Team	1	2	3	4	Total
Golden Hurricane	0	0	0	14	14
• Huskies	3	0	14	3	20

- TV announcers: Mike Couzens, John Congemi

Scoring summary
1	00:44	UConn	Michael Tarbutt 35-yard field goal	UConn 3–0
3	10:13	UConn	Nate Hopkins 1-yard run (Tarbutt kick)	UConn 10–0
3	08:00	UConn	Hergy Mayala 80-yard pass from Bryant Shirreffs (Tarbutt kick)	UConn 17–0
4	08:33	UConn	Tarbutt 28-yard field goal	UConn 20–0
4	07:09	TU	Shamari Brooks 8-yard run (Redford Jones kick)	UConn 20–7
4	02:16	TU	Brooks 1-yard run (Jones kick)	UConn 20–14

=== At SMU ===
Team	1	2	3	4	Total
Golden Hurricane	14	14	6	0	34
• Mustangs	7	14	7	10	38

- TV announcers: Dave LaMont, Dusty Dvoracek, Alex Chappell

Scoring summary
1	11:01	TU	Nigel Carter 41-yard pass from Luke Skipper (Redford Jones kick)	TU 7–0
1	07:11	SMU	Trey Quinn 7-yard pass from Ben Hicks (Josh Williams kick)	Tied 7–7
1	03:02	TU	Shamari Brooks 4-yard run (Jones kick)	TU 14–7
2	12:01	TU	Chad President 8-yard run (Jones kick)	TU 21–7
2	11:49	SMU	Braeden West 75-yard run (Williams kick)	TU 21–14
2	03:53	TU	D'Angelo Brewer 9-yard run (Jones kick)	TU 28–14
2	02:47	SMU	Quinn 23-yard pass from Hicks (Williams kick)	TU 28–21
3	11:01	TU	Jones 49-yard field goal	TU 31–21
3	03:36	SMU	Ke'Mon Freeman 2-yard run (Williams kick)	TU 31–28
3	01:08	TU	Jones 51-yard field goal	TU 34–28
4	13:26	SMU	Xavier Jones 9-yard run (Williams kick)	SMU 35–34
4	09:31	SMU	Williams 29-yard field goal	SMU 38–34

=== Memphis ===
Team	1	2	3	4	Total
• No. 22 Tigers	14	7	10	10	41
Golden Hurricane	7	7	0	0	14

- TV announcers: Adam Amin, Dusty Dvoracek, Molly McGrath

Scoring summary
1	06:46	MEM	Darrell Henderson 17-yard pass from Riley Ferguson (Riley Patterson kick)	MEM 7–0
1	02:48	TU	Luke Skipper 10-yard run (Redford Jones kick)	Tied 7–7
1	01:44	MEM	Tony Pollard 59-yard pass from Ferguson (Patterson kick)	MEM 14–7
2	12:40	TU	Chad President 7-yard run (Jones kick)	Tied 14–14
2	06:42	MEM	Anthony Miller 18-yard pass from Ferguson (Patterson kick)	MEM 21–14
3	08:31	MEM	Patrick Taylor 1-yard run (Patterson kick)	MEM 28–14
3	03:05	MEM	Patterson 33-yard field goal	MEM 31–14
4	10:43	MEM	Damonte Coxie 9-yard pass from Ferguson (Patterson kick)	MEM 38–14
4	05:38	MEM	Patterson 30-yard field goal	MEM 41–14

=== At South Florida ===
	1	2	3	4	Total
Golden Hurricane	7	10	0	3	20
No. 23 Bulls	21	3	3	0	27

=== Temple ===
	1	2	3	4	Total
Owls	10	21	6	6	43
Golden Hurricane	7	6	7	2	22

== Roster ==
2017 Tulsa Golden Hurricane football team roster
Players
Coaches
Offense

Pos.	#	Name	Class
WR	1	Josh Stewart	RFr
WR	2	Keylon Stokes	Fr
RB	3	Shamari Brooks	Fr
RB	4	D'Angelo Brewer	Sr
WR	5	Brodrick Umblance	Sr
TE	6	Chris Minter	Jr
WR	7	Bishop Louie	Sr
WR	8	Keenen Johnson	So
WR	9	Sam Crawford Jr.	Fr
QB	10	Chad President	RSo
WR	11	Nigel Carter	Sr
QB	12	Seth Boomer	Fr
QB	13	Luke Skipper	RFr
WR	16	Jarion Anderson	RSo
QB	19	Will Hefley III	RSo
WR	20	Cannon Montgomery	Fr
RB	21	Rowdy Simon	RSr
RB	22	Javon Thomas	RSo
WR	23	Jordan Brown	RFr
RB	24	Corey Taylor II	So
RB	25	Ramadi Warren	RJr
RB	26	Matthew Harvey	RFr
WR	29	Justin Hobbs	RJr
TE	33	Rob Riederer	RSr
RB	34	Reed Martin	Fr
TE	38	Cole Neph	RJr
WR	41	Andrew McKinnis	RFr
TE	42	David Fitzwater	RFr
G	53	Zac Uhles	RSr
OL	55	Gerard Wheeler	Fr
OT	58	Willie Wright	RJr
G	63	Trip Newfield	RFr
OT	65	Chris Ivy Jr.	RSo
OT	66	Evan Plagg	RSr
G	67	Tristan Wyatt	RSo
G	68	Tiller Bucktrot	RFr
C	70	Clay Greathouse	RFr
OL	71	Chris Paul	Fr
G	72	Tyler Bowling	RJr
C	74	Chandler Miller	RJr
OL	75	Dante Bivens	Fr
OT	76	Waahid Muhammad	RFr
OT	77	Isaac Johnson	RJr
G	79	Rowdy Frederick	RFr
WR	80	J.C. Santana	Fr
WR	84	Avery Gragg	RSo
WR	86	David Snelling	RSo
WR	88	Malik Jackson	Fr

Defense

Pos.	#	Name	Class
CB	1	Keanu Hill	RSr
CB	2	Kerwin Thomas	RSr
S	3	Cristian Williams	RSo
LB	4	Robert Revels III	So
S	5	McKinley Whitfield	Jr
LB	6	Diamon Cannon	RSo
DE	8	Jesse Brubaker	RSr
CB	9	Reggie Robinson	RSo
S	10	Manny Bunch	So
CB	11	Keidrien Wadley	RSo
S	12	Allie Green IV	Fr
S	13	Jordan Mitchell	Sr
DE	15	Trevis Gipson	RSo
CB	16	Montray Norris	RFr
S	18	Samuel Gottsch	RJr
S	21	Bryson Powers	Fr
S	22	Marcus Mays	Fr
LB	23	Zaven Collins	Fr
LB	24	Treyvon Reeves	RFr
CB	26	Akayleb Evans	Fr
S	27	Daiquain Jackson	Fr
LB	28	Craig Suits	RSr
S	30	Ryan McDaniel	Fr
LB	32	DJ Allen	RFr
LB	42	Cooper Edmiston	So
LB	44	Petera Wilson Jr.	Sr
LB	46	Forrest Harrell III	RSo
LB	47	Blake Landon	RFr
DE	50	Branden Ferguson	RFr
LB	52	Thomas von Borstel	RSo
DT	54	Shemarr Robinson	So
DT	55	Garrett Flanary	Fr
DE	57	Beau Wooden	RFr
DE	58	Deven Lamp	Fr
LB	59	C.J. Gooden	RSr
DT	71	Jacob Pugh	RFr
DE	85	Kolton Shindelar	RSr
DT	88	Jimmy Nelson	RFr
DT	89	Payton Prince	RJr
DE	90	Frankie Davis	RSr
DE	91	Jake Hanks	RSr
DE	92	Christian Bricker	Fr
DE	95	Ryan Patrick	Fr
DE	96	Myles Mouton	RJr
DT	97	Tyarise Stevenson	RFr
DE	98	Jeremy Smith	Sr
DT	99	Johnnie Williams	RFr

Special teams

Pos.	#	Name	Class
K	19	Redford Jones	RSr
P	23	Thomas Bennett	RSo
LS	42	Adam Higuera	Fr
K	49	Tristan Lacey	RJr
K	90	Nathan Walker	RJr

Head coach

- Philip Montgomery (Tarleton State)

Coordinators/assistant coaches

- Brian Norwood (Hawaiʻi)
  Associate head coach, Co-defensive coordinator, Safeties
- Bill Young (Oklahoma State)
  Defensive coordinator, defensive line
- Jermial Ashley (Kansas)
  Defensive line coach
- Mike Bloesch (Houston)
  Offensive line coach
- Aaron Fletcher (East Texas A&M)
  Cornerbacks coach
- Joseph Gillespie (Angelo State)
  Linebackers coach
- Justin Hill (Rice)
  Running backs coach
- Calvin Lowry (Penn State)
  Receivers coach
- Beau Trahan (Texas)
  Quarterbacks coach
- Jordan Najvar (Baylor)
  Offensive quality control
- Luke Olson (Southern Nazarene)
  Defensive quality control
- Clint Rountree (Tulsa)
  Director of high school relations
- Kyle Grooms (Tulsa)
  Director of football operations
- Ravi Savitala (UC Santa Cruz)
  Assistant director of football operations & recruiting
- Dan Bitson (Tulsa)
  Director of player personnel & development
- D.J. Welte (Arkansas State)
  Director of football video operations
- Mike Hicks
  Defensive analyst
- Steven Haunga (Arkansas State)
  Offensive graduate assistant
- Paul Cherry
  Defensive graduate assistant
- Tom Ososkie
  Director of scouting
- Grant Lester
  Offensive analyst

Legend

- (C) Team captain
- (S) Suspended
- (I) Ineligible
- Injured
- Redshirt

Roster
Last update: September 2016
