= 2019 East Carolina Pirates football team =

American college football season

2019 East Carolina Pirates football
- Conference: American Athletic Conference
- East Division
- Record: 4–8 (1–7 The American)
- Head coach: Mike Houston (1st season)
- Offensive coordinator: Donnie Kirkpatrick (1st season)
- Offensive scheme: Spread
- Defensive coordinator: Bob Trott (1st season)
- Base defense: 4–3
- Home stadium: Dowdy-Ficklen Stadium

Uniform
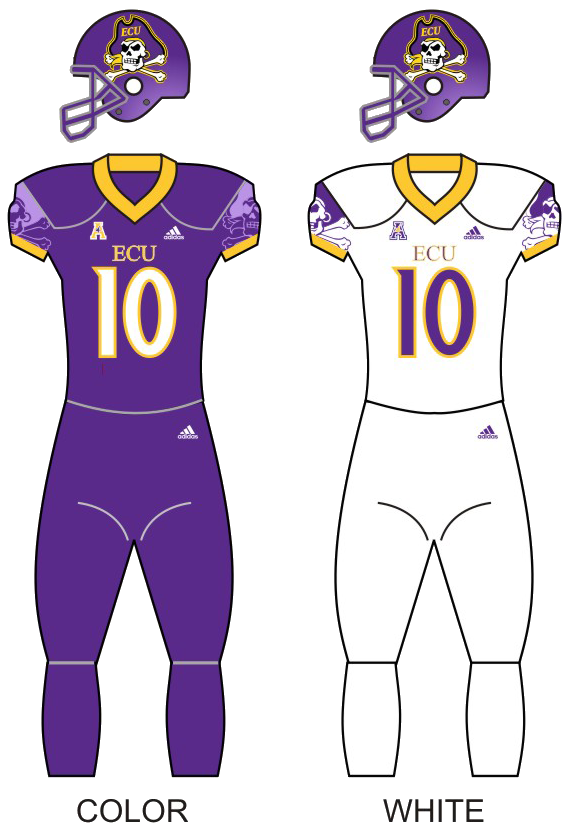

2019 American Athletic Conference football standings
	Conf.			Overall
Team	W		L	W		L
East Division
No. 21 Cincinnati xy	7	–	1	11	–	3
No. 24 UCF	6	–	2	10	–	3
Temple	5	–	3	8	–	5
South Florida	2	–	6	4	–	8
East Carolina	1	–	7	4	–	8
UConn	0	–	8	2	–	10
West Division
No. 17 Memphis xy$	7	–	1	12	–	2
No. 20 Navy x	7	–	1	11	–	2
SMU	6	–	2	10	–	3
Tulane	3	–	5	7	–	6
Houston	2	–	6	4	–	8
Tulsa	2	–	6	4	–	8
Championship: Memphis 29, Cincinnati 24
$ – Conference champion; x – Division champion/co-champions; y – Championship game participant; Rankings from AP Poll

The 2019 East Carolina Pirates football team represented East Carolina University in the 2019 NCAA Division I FBS football season. The Pirates, led by first-year head coach Mike Houston, played their home games at Dowdy-Ficklen Stadium, and were members of the East Division in the American Athletic Conference. They finished the season 4–8, 1–7 in AAC play to finish in fifth place in the East Division.

== Preseason ==
=== AAC media poll ===
The AAC media poll was released on July 16, 2019, with the Pirates predicted to finish fifth in the AAC East Division.

== Schedule ==
Date	Time	Opponent	Site	TV	Result	Attendance
August 31	12:00 p.m.	at NC State*	Carter–Finley Stadium; Raleigh, NC (rivalry)	ACCN	L 6–34	57,633
September 7	6:00 p.m.	Gardner–Webb*	Dowdy–Ficklen Stadium; Greenville, NC	ESPN3	W 48–9	34,118
September 14	3:30 p.m.	at Navy	Navy–Marine Corps Memorial Stadium; Annapolis, MD	CBSSN	L 10–42	30,707
September 21	6:00 p.m.	William & Mary*	Dowdy–Ficklen Stadium; Greenville, NC	ESPN3	W 19–7	38,004
September 28	6:00 p.m.	at Old Dominion*	S.B. Ballard Stadium; Norfolk, VA	ESPN+	W 24–21	18,643
October 3	8:00 p.m.	Temple	Dowdy–Ficklen Stadium; Greenville, NC	ESPN	L 17–27	33,253
October 19	7:00 p.m.	at UCF	Spectrum Stadium; Orlando, FL	CBSSN	L 28–41	42,906
October 26	3:45 p.m.	South Florida^{†}	Dowdy–Ficklen Stadium; Greenville, NC	ESPNU	L 20–45	33,088
November 2	7:00 p.m.	No. 17 Cincinnati	Dowdy–Ficklen Stadium; Greenville, NC	CBSSN	L 43–46	32,276
November 9	12:00 p.m.	at No. 25 SMU	Gerald J. Ford Stadium; Dallas, TX	ESPNU	L 51–59	29,528
November 23	12:00 p.m.	at UConn	Rentschler Field; East Hartford, CT	ESPN3	W 31–24	12,084
November 30	12:00 p.m.	Tulsa	Dowdy–Ficklen Stadium; Greenville, NC	ESPNU	L 24–49	27,978
*Non-conference game; ^{†}Homecoming; Rankings from AP Poll and CFP Rankings after November 5 released prior to game; All times are in Eastern time

Schedule source:

== Personnel ==
=== Coaching staff ===
Position	Name	Years at ECU	Alma mater
Head coach:	Mike Houston	1st	Mars Hill '94
Defensive coordinator Safeties coach:	Bob Trott	1st	UNC '76
Offensive coordinator Quarterbacks coach:	Donnie Kirkpatrick	1st	Lenoir-Rhyne '82
Special Teams Coordinator:	Roy Tesh	1st	Greensboro College '04
offensive line coach:	Steve Shankweiler	1st	Davidson '74
Wide Receivers coach:	Drew Dudzik	1st	JMU '10
Running backs coach:	De'Rail Sims	1st	Pikesville '10
Cornerbacks coach:	Brandon Lynch	3rd	Middle Tennessee '06
Defensive line coach	Jeff Hanson	1st	Richmond '71
Special Teams Assistant:	Fontel Mines	1st	Virginia '07

== Game summaries ==
=== At NC State ===
East Carolina at North Carolina State – Game summary

Quarter	1	2	3	4	Total
Pirates	3	0	0	3	6
Wolfpack	7	10	7	10	34

at Carter–Finley Stadium, Raleigh, NC

- Date: August 31
- Game time: 10:00 a.m. EST
- Game weather: Sunny, 88 °F (31 °C)
- Game attendance: 57,633
- Referee: Adam Savoie
- TV announcers (ACC Network): Wes Durham (play-by-play), Roddy Jones (analyst), and Eric Wood (sideline)

Game information

First quarter

- NCST - Zonovan Knight 9-yard TD run, Christopher Dunn kick good, 8:34 (NCST 7-0)
- ECU - Jake Verity 47-yard field goal, 6:04 (NCST 7-3)

Second quarter

- NCST - Dunn 27-yard field goal, 10:01 (NCST 10-3)
- NCST - Matthew McKay 4-yard TD run, Dunn kick good, 0:51 (NCST 17-3)

Third quarter

- NCST - Tabari Hines 48-yard TD pass from McKay, Dunn kick good, 9:48 (NCST 24-3)

Fourth quarter

- NCST - McKay 21-yard TD run, Dunn kick good, 12:21 (NCST 31-3)
- NCST - Dunn 34-yard field goal, 4:14 (NCST 34-3)
- ECU - Verity 31-yard field goal, 1:18 (NCST 34-6)

Top passers

- NCST - Matthew McKay - 25/37, 308 yards, TD
- ECU - Holton Ahlers - 22/39, 168 yards, INT

Top rushers

- NCST - Zonovan Knight - 9 carries, 42 yards, TD
- ECU - Darius Pinnix Jr. - 11 carries, 23 yards

Top receivers

- NCST - Thayer Thomas - 6 receptions, 83 yards
- ECU - Blake Proehl - 5 receptions, 45 yards

=== Gardner–Webb ===
Gardner–Webb at East Carolina – Game summary

Quarter	1	2	3	4	Total
Runnin' Bulldogs	0	7	2	0	9
Pirates	17	14	7	10	48

at Dowdy–Ficklen Stadium, Greenville, NC

- Date: September 7
- Game time: 4:00 p.m. EST
- Game attendance: 34,118
- TV announcers (ESPN3): Matt Stewart (play-by-play) and Stan Lewter (analyst)

Game information

First quarter
Second quarter
Third quarter
Fourth quarter

Top passers

- GWU -
- ECU -

Top rushers

- GWU -
- ECU -

Top receivers

- GWU -
- ECU -

=== At Navy ===
East Carolina at Navy – Game summary

Quarter	1	2	3	4	Total
Pirates	0	3	0	7	10
Midshipmen	14	14	14	0	42

at Navy-Marine Corps Memorial Stadium, Annapolis, MD

- Date: September 14
- Game time: 3:30 p.m. EST
- Game weather: Temperature: 79 °F (26 °C) • Wind: S 10-15 mph • Weather: Overcast
- Game attendance: 30,707
- Referee: Charles Lamertina
- TV announcers (CBSSN): John Sadak (play-by-play), Randy Cross (analyst), and Sheehan Stanwick-Burch (sideline)

Game information

First quarter

- (11:26) NAVY TD – Malcolm Perry 18-yard rush, Bijan Nichols kick
  Drive: 6 plays, 38 yards, 2:08; Navy 7–0
- (05:46) NAVY TD – Malcolm Perry 11-yard rush, Bijan Nichols kick
  Drive: 8 plays, 65 yards, 3:54; Navy 14–0

Second quarter

- (13:38) NAVY TD – CJ Williams 29-yard pass from Malcolm Perry, Bijan Nichols kick
  Drive: 10 plays, 85 yards, 5:08; Navy 21–0
- (09:09) ECU FG – Jake Verity 23-yard field goal
  Drive: 11 plays, 69 yards, 4:29; Navy 21–3
- (05:25) NAVY TD – Malcolm Perry 6-yard rush, Bijan Nichols kick
  Drive: 8 plays, 72 yards, 3:44; Navy 28–3

Third quarter

- (07:53) NAVY TD – Malcolm Perry 1-yard rush, Bijan Nichols kick
  Drive: 14 plays, 75 yards, 7:07; Navy 35–3
- (06:34) NAVY TD – CJ Williams 80-yard pass from Malcolm Perry, Bijan Nichols kick
  Drive: 1 play, 80 yards, 0:12; Navy 42–3

Fourth quarter

- (12:30) ECU TD – Holton Ahlers 2-yard rush, Jake Verity kick
  Drive: 8 plays, 50 yards, 2:46; Navy 42–10

Top passers

- ECU – Holton Ahlers: 11/23, 138 yards, 1 INT
- NAVY – Malcolm Perry: 5/7, 151 yards, 2 TD

Top rushers

- ECU – Holton Ahlers: 9 carries, 36 yards, 1 TD
- NAVY – Malcolm Perry: 24 carries, 156 yards, 4 TD

Top receivers

- ECU – Tyler Snead: 3 receptions, 54 yards
- NAVY – C.J. Williams: 3 receptions, 117 yards, 2 TD

=== William & Mary ===
William & Mary at East Carolina – Game summary

Quarter	1	2	3	4	Total
Tribe	0	7	0	0	7
Pirates	7	3	3	6	19

at Dowdy-Ficklen Stadium, Greenville, NC

- Date: September 21
- Game time: 6:00 p.m. EST
- Game attendance: 38,004
- TV announcers (ESPN3): Joel Meyers (play-by-play) and Stan Lewter (analyst)

Game information

First quarter
Second quarter
Third quarter
Fourth quarter

Top passers

- W&M -
- ECU -

Top rushers

- W&M -
- ECU -

Top receivers

- W&M -
- ECU -

=== At Old Dominion ===
East Carolina at Old Dominion – Game summary

Quarter	1	2	3	4	Total
Pirates	10	7	0	7	24
Monarchs	3	0	10	8	21

at S.B. Ballard Stadium, Norfolk, VA

- Date: September 28
- Game time: 6:00 p.m. EST
- Game attendance: 18,643
- TV announcers (ESPN+): Ted Alexander (play-by-play), Andy Mashaw (analyst), and Doug Ripley (sideline)

Game information

First quarter
Second quarter
Third quarter
Fourth quarter

Top passers

- ECU -
- ODU -

Top rushers

- ECU -
- ODU -

Top receivers

- ECU -
- ODU -

=== Temple ===
Temple at East Carolina – Game summary

Quarter	1	2	3	4	Total
Owls	0	17	7	3	27
Pirates	7	3	0	7	17

at Dowdy–Ficklen Stadium, Greenville, NC

- Date: October 3
- Game time: 8:00 p.m. EST
- Game attendance: 33,253
- TV announcers (ESPN): Adam Amin (play-by-play), Matt Hasselbeck, Pat McAfee (analysts), and Molly McGrath (sideline)

Game information

First quarter
Second quarter
Third quarter
Fourth quarter

Top passers

- TEMP -
- ECU -

Top rushers

- TEMP -
- ECU -

Top receivers

- TEMP -
- ECU -

=== At UCF ===
East Carolina at UCF – Game summary

Quarter	1	2	3	4	Total
Pirates	0	6	16	6	28
Knights	21	14	6	0	41

at Spectrum Stadium, Orlando, FL

- Date: October 19
- Game time: 7:00 p.m. EST
- Game attendance: 42,906
- TV announcers (CBSSN): Ben Holden (play-by-play) and Ross Tucker (analyst)

Game information

First quarter
Second quarter
Third quarter
Fourth quarter

Top passers

- ECU -
- UCF -

Top rushers

- ECU -
- UCF -

Top receivers

- ECU -
- UCF -

=== South Florida ===
South Florida at East Carolina – Game summary

Quarter	1	2	3	4	Total
Bulls	14	21	3	7	45
Pirates	7	3	0	10	20

at Dowdy–Ficklen Stadium, Greenville, NC

- Date: October 26
- Game time: 3:45 p.m.
- Game attendance: 33,088
- TV announcers (ESPNU): Mike Corey (play-by-play) and Rene Ingoglia (analyst)

Game information

First quarter
Second quarter
Third quarter
Fourth quarter

Top passers

- USF -
- ECU -

Top rushers

- USF -
- ECU -

Top receivers

- USF -
- ECU -

=== No. 17 Cincinnati ===
Cincinnati at East Carolina – Game summary

Quarter	1	2	3	4	Total
No. 17 Bearcats	21	0	7	18	46
Pirates	14	17	9	3	43

at Dowdy–Ficklen Stadium, Greenville, NC

- Date: November 2
- Game time: 7:08 p.m. EDT
- Game weather: Clear, 54 °F (12 °C)
- Game attendance: 32,273
- Referee: Edwin Lee
- TV announcers (CBSSN): Rich Waltz (play-by-play), Aaron Murray (analyst), and Amanda Balionis (sideline)

Game information

First quarter

- (9:20) CIN – Michael Warren II 1-yard run, Sam Crosa kick (Drive: 5 plays, 50 yards, 2:07; Cincinnati 7–0)
- (9:09) ECU – C. J. Johnson 75-yard pass from Holton Ahlers, Jake Verity kick (Drive: 1 play, 75 yards, 0:11; Tied 7–7)
- (8:19) CIN – Gerrid Doaks 2-yard run, Sam Crosa kick (Drive: 3 plays, 75 yards, 0:50; Cincinnati 14–7)
- (3:22) ECU – Holton Ahlers 6-yard run, Jake Verity kick (Drive: 14 plays, 75 yards, 4:57; Tied 14–14)
- (0:19) CIN – Michael Warren II 1-yard run, Sam Crosa kick (Drive: 8 plays, 75 yards, 3:03; Cincinnati 21–14)

Second quarter

- (5:57) ECU – Zech Byrd 3-yard pass from Holton Ahlers, Jake Verity kick (Drive: 6 plays, 75 yards, 2:42; Tied 21–21)
- (3:10) ECU – Jsi Hatfield 3-yard pass from Holton Ahlers, Jake Verity kick (Drive: 7 plays, 71 yards, 1:56; East Carolina 28–21)
- (0:01) ECU – Jake Verity 27-yard field goal (Drive: 4 plays, 38 yards, 0:22; East Carolina 31–21)

Third quarter

- (10:45) CIN – Michael Warren II 3-yard run, Sam Crosa kick (Drive: 9 plays, 75 yards, 4:15; East Carolina 31–28)
- (4:20) ECU – Jake Verity 20-yard field goal (Drive: 15 plays, 80 yards, 6:25; East Carolina 34–28)
- (0:14) ECU – Tyler Snead 9-yard pass from Holton Ahlers, Holton Ahlers pass failed (Drive: 7 plays, 81 yards, 2:32; East Carolina 40–28)

Fourth quarter

- (8:37) CIN – Josiah Deguara 3-yard pass from Desmond Ridder, Sam Crosa kick (Drive: 13 plays, 75 yards, 6:37; East Carolina 40–35)
- (4:38) CIN – Sauce Gardner 62-yard interception, Josiah Deguara pass (Cincinnati 43–40)
- (1:10) ECU – Jake Verity 27-yard field goal (Drive: 9 plays, 65 yards, 3:28; Tied 43–43)
- (0:00) CIN – Sam Crosa 32-yard field goal (Drive: 7 plays, 50 yards, 1:10; Cincinnati 46–43)

Top passers

- CIN - Desmond Ridder – 12/24, 161 yards, TD, 2 INT
- ECU - Holton Ahlers – 32/52, 535 yards, 4 TD, INT

Top rushers

- CIN - Desmond Ridder – 12 carries, 146 yards
- ECU - Trace Christian – 9 carries, 44 yards

Top receivers

- CIN - Josiah Deguara – 2 receptions, 76 yards
- ECU - C. J. Johnson – 12 receptions, 283 yards

=== At SMU ===
East Carolina at SMU – Game summary

Quarter	1	2	3	4	Total
Pirates	7	13	17	14	51
No. 23 Mustangs	14	14	17	14	59

at Gerald J. Ford Stadium, University Park, TX

- Date: November 9
- Game time: 12:00 p.m. EST
- Game weather: Sunny, 57 °F (14 °C)
- Game attendance: 29,528
- Referee: Henry Johns
- TV announcers (ESPNU): Mike Couzens (play-by-play) and Kirk Morrison (analyst)

Game information

First quarter

- (12:44) SMU TD – Kylen Granson 22-yard pass from Shane Buechele, Kevin Robledo kick
  Southern Methodist 7–0; Drive: 8 plays, 75 yards, 2:16
- (07:20) ECU TD – Jsi Hatfield 68-yard pass from Holton Ahlers, Jake Verity kick
  Tied 7–7; Drive: 3 plays, 70 yards, 0:42
- (03:51) SMU TD – Kylen Granson 4-yard pass from Shane Buechele, Kevin Robledo kick
  Southern Methodist 14–7; Drive: 9 plays, 75 yards, 3:29

Second quarter

- (11:06) ECU FG – Jake Verity 38-yard field goal
  Southern Methodist 14–10; Drive: 9 plays, 34 yards, 3:39
- (07:28) SMU TD – Xavier Jones 3-yard rush, Kevin Robledo kick
  Southern Methodist 21–10; Drive: 11 plays, 75 yards, 3:38
- (04:45) SMU TD – James Proche 51-yard pass from Shane Buechele, Kevin Robledo kick
  Southern Methodist 28–10; Drive: 3 plays, 66 yards, 1:02
- (02:04) ECU TD – Tyler Snead 36-yard pass from Holton Ahlers, Jake Verity kick
  Southern Methodist 28–17; Drive: 6 plays, 73 yards, 2:37
- (00:00) SMU FG – Jake Verity 37-yard field goal
  Southern Methodist 28–20; Drive: 7 plays, 60 yards, 1:00

Third quarter

- (13:53) ECU TD – Zech Byrd 45-yard pass from Holton Ahlers, Jake Verity kick
  Southern Methodist 28–27; Drive: 3 plays, 75 yards, 1:07
- (12:01) SMU TD – Xavier Jones 35-yard rush, Kevin Robledo kick
  Southern Methodist 35–27; Drive: 7 plays, 75 yards, 1:52
- (08:06) ECU TD – Tyler Snead 47-yard pass from Holton Ahlers, Jake Verity kick
  Southern Methodist 35–34; Drive: 8 plays, 75 yards, 3:55
- (05:34) SMU FG – Kevin Robledo 23-yard field goal
  Southern Methodist 38–34; Drive: 7 plays, 47 yards, 2:22
- (01:56) ECU FG – Jake Verity 41-yard field goal
  Southern Methodist 38–37; Drive: 10 plays, 51 yards, 3:38
- (00:19) SMU TD – Xavier Jones 64-yard rush, Kevin Robledo kick
  Southern Methodist 45–37; Drive: 4 plays, 75 yards, 1:29

Fourth quarter

- (10:58) ECU TD – Tyler Snead 57-yard pass from Holton Ahlers, Jake Verity kick
  Southern Methodist 45–44; Drive: 10 plays, 97 yards, 4:20
- (07:25) SMU TD – Kylen Granson 31-yard pass from Shane Buechele, Kevin Robledo kick
  Southern Methodist 52–44; Drive: 9 plays, 75 yards, 3:40
- (04:18) SMU TD – James Proche 3-yard pass from Shane Buechele, Kevin Robledo kick
  Southern Methodist 59–44; Drive: 6 plays, 22 yards, 3:00
- (01:55) ECU TD – Audie Omotosho 22-yard pass from Holton Ahlers, Jake Verity kick
  Southern Methodist 59–51; Drive: 8 plays, 72 yards, 2:16

Top passers

- ECU – Holton Ahlers – 32/42, 498 yards, 6 TD
- SMU – Shane Buechele – 33/46, 414 yards, 5 TD, INT

Top rushers

- ECU – Tay Williams – 14 carries, 61 yards
- SMU – Xavier Jones – 20 carries, 157 yards, 3 TD

Top receivers

- ECU – Tyler Snead – 19 receptions, 240 yards, 3 TD
- SMU – James Proche – 14 receptions, 167 yards, 2 TD

=== At UConn ===
East Carolina at Connecticut – Game summary

Quarter	1	2	3	4	Total
Pirates	10	7	7	7	31
Huskies	7	0	7	10	24

at Rentschler Field, Hartford, CT

- Date: November 23
- Game time: 12:00 p.m.
- Game weather: 40 °F (4 °C) • Wind: 9 W • Weather: Gorgeous Fall Day
- Game attendance: 12,084
- Referee: Edwin Lee
- TV announcers (ESPN3): Robert Lee (play-by-play) and Matt Chatham (analyst)

Game information

First quarter

- UCONN • 13:07 • Cameron Ross 40 yd pass from Jack Zergiotis (Clayton Harris kick) • UCONN 7–0
- ECU • 05:57 • Jake Verity 26 yd field goal • UCONN 7–3
- ECU • 01:11 • Darius Pinnix 3 yd run (Jake Verity kick) • ECU 10–7

Second quarter

- ECU • 01:49 • Zech Byrd 17 yd pass from Holton Ahlers (Jake Verity kick) • ECU 17–7

Third quarter

- UCONN • 13:09 • Jay Rose 20 yd pass from Jack Zergiotis (Clayton Harris kick) • ECU 17–14
- ECU • 10:31 • Darius Pinnix 1 yd run (Jake Verity kick) • ECU 24–14

Fourth quarter

- UCONN • 14:33 • Clayton Harris 27 yd field goal • ECU 24–17
- UCONN • 09:28 • Cameron Ross 94 yd pass from Jack Zergiotis (Clayton Harris kick) • TIED 24–24
- ECU • 03:28 • Holton Ahlers 2 yd run (Jake Verity kick) • ECU 31–24

Top passers

- ECU - Holton Ahlers – 34/50, 374 yards, TD
- UCONN - Jack Zergiotis – 21/37, 418 yards, 3 TD

Top rushers

- ECU - Darius Pinnix – 27 attempts, 105 yards, 2 TD
- UCONN - Kevin Mensah – 20 attempts, 75 yards

Top receivers

- ECU - Tyler Snead – 16 receptions, 126 yards
- UCONN - Cameron Ross – 8 receptions, 169 yards, 2 TD

=== Tulsa ===
Tulsa at East Carolina – Game summary

Quarter	1	2	3	4	Total
Golden Hurricane	7	14	14	14	49
Pirates	3	0	7	14	24

at Dowdy–Ficklen Stadium, Greenville, NC

- Date: November 30
- Game time: 12:02 p.m. EST
- Game weather: Cloudy with Drizzle, 48 °F (9 °C), Calm
- Game attendance: 27,978
- Referee: A. Calabrese
- TV announcers (ESPNU): Mike Couzens (play-by-play) and Kirk Morrison (analyst)

Game information

First quarter

- (1:42) ECU – Jake Verity 51-yard field goal (Drive: 10 plays, 52 yards, 3:20; East Carolina 3–0)
- (1:06) TUL – Sam Crawford Jr. 66-yard pass from Zach Smith, Jacob Rainey kick (Drive: 2 plays, 75 yards, 0:36; Tulsa 7–3)

Second quarter

- (12:09) TUL – Keylon Stokes 29-yard pass from Zach Smith, Jacob Rainey kick (Drive: 6 plays, 65 yards, 1:52; Tulsa 14–3)
- (4:45) TUL – Keenen Johnson 4-yard pass from Zach Smith, Jacob Rainey kick (Drive: 10 plays, 92 yards, 5:50; Tulsa 21–3)

Third quarter

- (11:40) TUL – T. K. Wilerson 10-yard run, Jacob Rainey kick (Drive: 4 plays, 21 yards, 0:34; Tulsa 28–3)
- (6:55) ECU – Blake Proehl 3-yard pass from Holton Ahlers, Jake Verity kick (Drive: 12 plays, 75 yards, 4:45; Tulsa 28–10)
- (4:10) TUL – Shamari Brooks 2-yard pass from Zach Smith, Jacob Rainey kick (Drive: 7 plays, 58 yards, 2:45; Tulsa 35–10)

Fourth quarter

- (14:31) TUL – Corey Taylor II 12-yard run, Jacob Rainey kick (Drive: 4 plays, 82 yards, 0:50; Tulsa 42–10)
- (11:17) ECU – C. J. Johnson 35-yard pass from Holton Ahlers, Jake Verity kick (Drive: 9 plays, 78 yards, 3:14; Tulsa 42–17)
- (6:36) TUL – Ethan Hall 39-yard pass from Zach Smith, Danny Donley kick (Drive: 8 plays, 75 yards, 4:41; Tulsa 49–17)
- (2:36) ECU – Blake Proehl 34-yard pass from Holton Ahlers, Jake Verity kick (Drive: 3 plays, 37 yards, 1:11; Tulsa 49–24)

Top passers

- TUL - Zach Smith – 21/30, 331 yards, 5 TD, INT
- ECU - Holton Ahlers – 27/48, 308 yards, 3 TD

Top rushers

- TUL - Shamari Brooks – 16 carries, 202 yards
- ECU - Holton Ahlers – 6 carries, 35 yards

Top receivers

- TUL - Sam Crawford Jr. – 5 receptions, 93 yards, TD
- ECU - C. J. Johnson – 6 receptions, 141 yards, TD
