= 2019 Tulsa Golden Hurricane football team =

American college football season

2019 Tulsa Golden Hurricane football
- Conference: American Athletic Conference
- West Division
- Record: 4–8 (2–6 AAC)
- Head coach: Philip Montgomery (5th season)
- Offensive scheme: Veer and shoot
- Defensive coordinator: Joe Gillespie (1st season)
- Base defense: 3–3–5
- Home stadium: Skelly Field at H. A. Chapman Stadium

2019 American Athletic Conference football standings
	Conf.			Overall
Team	W		L	W		L
East Division
No. 21 Cincinnati xy	7	–	1	11	–	3
No. 24 UCF	6	–	2	10	–	3
Temple	5	–	3	8	–	5
South Florida	2	–	6	4	–	8
East Carolina	1	–	7	4	–	8
UConn	0	–	8	2	–	10
West Division
No. 17 Memphis xy$	7	–	1	12	–	2
No. 20 Navy x	7	–	1	11	–	2
SMU	6	–	2	10	–	3
Tulane	3	–	5	7	–	6
Houston	2	–	6	4	–	8
Tulsa	2	–	6	4	–	8
Championship: Memphis 29, Cincinnati 24
$ – Conference champion; x – Division champion/co-champions; y – Championship game participant; Rankings from AP Poll

The 2019 Tulsa Golden Hurricane football team represented the University of Tulsa in the 2019 NCAA Division I FBS football season. The Golden Hurricane played their home games at Skelly Field at H. A. Chapman Stadium in Tulsa, Oklahoma, and competed in the West Division of the American Athletic Conference. They were led by fifth-year head coach Philip Montgomery. They finished the season 4–8, 2–6 in AAC play to finish in a tie for fifth-place in the West Division.

== Preseason ==
=== AAC media poll ===
The AAC media poll was released on July 16, 2019, with the Golden Hurricane predicted to finish sixth in the AAC West Division.

== Schedule ==
Date	Time	Opponent	Site	TV	Result	Attendance
August 30	6:00 p.m.	at No. 18 Michigan State*	Spartan Stadium; East Lansing, MI	FS1	L 7–28	72,005
September 7	8:00 p.m.	at San Jose State*	CEFCU Stadium; San Jose, CA	ESPN3	W 34–16	12,471
September 14	2:30 p.m.	Oklahoma State*	Skelly Field at H. A. Chapman Stadium; Tulsa, OK (rivalry)	ESPN2	L 21–40	28,612
September 21	2:30 p.m.	Wyoming*	Skelly Field at H. A. Chapman Stadium; Tulsa, OK	CBSSN	W 24–21	16,246
October 5	6:30 p.m.	at No. 24 SMU	Gerald J. Ford Stadium; Dallas, TX	ESPNU	L 37–43 ^{3OT}	28,142
October 12	6:30 p.m.	Navy	Skelly Field at H. A. Chapman Stadium; Tulsa, OK	ESPNU	L 17–45	17,951
October 19	2:30 p.m.	at No. 21 Cincinnati	Nippert Stadium; Cincinnati, OH	ESPNU	L 13–24	33,209
October 26	6:00 p.m.	Memphis^{†}	Skelly Field at H. A. Chapman Stadium; Tulsa, OK	CBSSN	L 41–42	17,183
November 2	2:30 p.m.	at Tulane	Yulman Stadium; New Orleans, LA	ESPN2	L 26–38	27,417
November 8	6:00 p.m.	UCF	Skelly Field at H. A. Chapman Stadium; Tulsa, OK	ESPN2	W 34–31	16,331
November 23	6:30 p.m.	Houston	Skelly Field at H. A. Chapman Stadium; Tulsa, OK	ESPNU	L 14–24	16,120
November 30	11:00 a.m.	at East Carolina	Dowdy–Ficklen Stadium; Greenville, NC	ESPNU	W 49–24	27,978
*Non-conference game; ^{†}Homecoming; Rankings from AP Poll and CFP Rankings after November 5 released prior to game; All times are in Central time

== Game summaries ==
=== At Michigan State ===
Team	1	2	3	4	Total
Golden Hurricane	0	7	0	0	7
• No. 18 Spartans	7	18	3	0	28

Scoring summary
1	11:41	MSU	Connor Heyward 15-yard pass from Brian Lewerke (Matt Coghlin kick)	MSU 7–0
2	14:03	MSU	Coghlin 38-yard field goal	MSU 10–0
2	9:59	MSU	Coghlin 47-yard field goal	MSU 13–0
2	9:09	MSU	Team Safety	MSU 15–0
2	4:49	MSU	Kenny Willekes 0-yard fumble return (Coghlin kick)	MSU 22–0
2	2:32	MSU	Coghlin 44-yard field goal	MSU 25–0
2	0:36	TU	Sam Crawford Jr. 28-yard pass from Zach Smith (Jacob Rainey kick)	MSU 25–7
3	2:20	MSU	Coghlin 40-yard field goal	MSU 28–7

=== At San Jose State ===
Team	1	2	3	4	Total
• Golden Hurricane	7	10	3	14	34
Spartans	3	7	0	6	16

Scoring summary
1	7:48	TU	Shamari Brooks 9-yard run (Jacob Rainey kick)	TU 7–0
1	3:59	SJSU	Matt Mercurio 22-yard field goal	TU 7–3
2	14:53	TU	Denzel Carter 8-yard pass from Zach Smith (Rainey kick)	TU 14–3
2	6:31	SJSU	Jermaine Braddock 23-yard pass from Josh Love (Mercurio kick)	TU 14–10
2	2:50	TU	Rainey 27-yard field goal	TU 17–10
3	3:03	TU	Rainey 28-yard field goal	TU 20–10
4	13:21	TU	T.K. Wilkerson 3-yard run (Rainey kick)	TU 27–10
4	10:12	TU	Wilkerson 17-yard run (Rainey kick)	TU 34–10
4	2:37	SJSU	Nick Nash 20-yard run (pass failed)	TU 34–16

=== Oklahoma State ===
Team	1	2	3	4	Total
• Cowboys	17	3	13	7	40
Golden Hurricane	7	14	0	0	21

Scoring summary
1	14:50	OSU	Chuba Hubbard 75-yard run (Matt Ammendola kick)	OSU 7–0
1	11:23	OSU	Hubbard 30-yard run (Ammendola kick)	OSU 14–0
1	6:00	OSU	Ammendola 37-yard field goal	OSU 17–0
1	4:23	TU	Keylon Stokes 39-yard pass from Zach Smith (Jacob Rainey kick)	OSU 17–7
2	11:50	OSU	Ammendola 36-yard field goal	OSU 20–7
2	9:57	TU	Shamari Brooks 3-yard run (Rainey kick)	OSU 20–14
2	2:29	TU	Brooks 1-yard run (Rainey kick)	TU 21–20
3	4:35	OSU	Spencer Sanders 27-yard run (Ammendola kick)	OSU 27–21
3	1:29	OSU	Tylan Wallace 90-yard pass from Sanders (run failed)	OSU 33–21
4	2:34	OSU	Hubbard 33-yard run (Ammendola kick)	OSU 40–21

=== Wyoming ===
Team	1	2	3	4	Total
Cowboys	7	0	0	14	21
• Golden Hurricane	0	14	3	7	24

Scoring summary
1	7:46	WYO	Sean Chambers 33-yard run (Cooper Rothe kick)	WYO 7–0
2	2:49	TU	Keylon Stokes 56-yard pass from Zach Smith (Jacob Rainey kick)	Tied 7–7
2	1:10	TU	Sam Crawford Jr. 37-yard pass from Smith (Rainey kick)	TU 14–7
3	9:26	TU	Rainey 29-yard field goal	TU 17–7
4	11:03	WYO	Ayden Eberhardt 53-yard pass from Chambers (Rothe kick)	TU 17–14
4	5:25	WYO	Chambers 15-yard run (Rothe kick)	WYO 21–17
4	3:26	TU	Shamari Brooks 19-yard run (Rainey kick)	TU 24–21

=== At SMU ===
Team	1	2	3	4	OT	2OT	3OT	Total
Golden Hurricane	3	20	7	0	7	0	0	37
• No. 24 Mustangs	6	3	0	21	7	0	6	43

Scoring summary
1	8:13	SMU	Ar’mani Johnson 64-yard Interception return (kick blocked)	SMU 6–0
1	4:16	TU	Jacob Rainey 32-yard field goal	SMU 6–3
2	13:46	TU	Keylon Stokes 58-yard pass from Zach Smith (Rainey kick)	TU 10–6
2	13:45	TU	Kendarin Ray 1-yard fumble return (kick blocked)	TU 16–6
2	7:34	SMU	Kevin Robledo 32-yard field goal	TU 16–9
2	5:23	TU	Stokes 5-yard pass from Smith (Rainey kick)	TU 23–9
3	11:47	TU	Keenen Johnson 40-yard pass from Smith (Rainey kick)	TU 30–9
4	14:56	SMU	Ke'Mon Freeman 1-yard run (Robledo kick)	TU 30–16
4	8:24	SMU	James Proche 30-yard pass from Shane Buechele (Robledo kick)	TU 30–23
4	1:02	SMU	Xavier Jones 4-yard run (Robledo kick)	Tied 30–30
OT		TU	Josh Johnson 7-yard pass from Smith (Rainey kick)	TU 37–30
OT		SMU	Jones 3-yard run (Robledo kick)	Tied 37–37
3OT		SMU	Proche 25-yard pass from Buechele	SMU 43–37

=== Navy ===
Team	1	2	3	4	Total
• Midshipmen	7	21	0	17	45
Golden Hurricane	3	0	7	7	17

Scoring summary
1	7:29	TU	Jacob Rainey 41-yard field goal	TU 3–0
1	0:09	NAVY	Malcolm Perry 29-yard run (Bijan Nichols kick)	NAVY 7–3
2	9:06	NAVY	CJ Williams 6-yard run (Nichols kick)	NAVY 14–3
2	6:02	NAVY	Nelson Smith 6-yard run (Nichols kick)	NAVY 21–3
2	2:11	NAVY	Perry 35-yard run (Nichols kick)	NAVY 28–3
3	12:18	TU	Corey Taylor II 1-yard run (Rainey kick)	NAVY 28–10
4	12:54	NAVY	Perry 3-yard run (Nichols kick)	NAVY 35–10
4	6:18	TU	T.K. Wilkerson 12-yard pass from Zach Smith (Rainey kick)	NAVY 35–17
4	3:47	NAVY	Nichols 37-yard field goal	NAVY 38–17
4	2:12	NAVY	Jamale Carothers 19-yard run (Nichols kick)	NAVY 45–17

=== At Cincinnati ===
Team	1	2	3	4	Total
Golden Hurricane	0	7	3	3	13
• No. 21 Bearcats	10	0	7	7	24

Scoring summary
1	11:50	CIN	Cole Smith 50-yard field goal	CIN 3–0
1	6:49	CIN	Gerrid Doaks 4-yard run (Sam Crosa kick)	CIN 10–0
2	0:17	TU	T.K. Wilkerson 3-yard run (Jacob Rainey kick)	CIN 10–7
3	8:33	CIN	Doaks 28-yard pass from Desmond Ridder (Crosa kick)	CIN 17–7
3	3:29	TU	Rainey 24-yard field goal	CIN 17–10
4	12:12	TU	Rainey 21-yard field goal	CIN 17–13
4	3:37	CIN	Doaks 27-yard run (Crosa kick)	CIN 24–13

=== Memphis ===
Team	1	2	3	4	Total
• Tigers	14	14	7	7	42
Golden Hurricane	0	17	14	10	41

Scoring summary
1	11:40	MEM	Kenneth Gainwell 20-yard run (Riley Patterson kick)	MEM 7–0
1	8:03	MEM	Antonio Gibson 40-yard pass from Brady White (Patterson kick)	MEM 14–0
2	14:52	TU	Shamari Brooks 40-yard run (Jacob Rainey kick)	MEM 14–7
2	9:25	MEM	Calvin Austin III 2-yard run (Patterson kick)	MEM 21–7
2	4:40	TU	Corey Taylor II 1-yard run (Rainey kick)	MEM 21–14
2	2:22	MEM	Joey Magnifico 5-yard pass from White (Patterson kick)	MEM 28–14
2	0:53	TU	Rainey 32-yard field goal	MEM 28–17
3	8:15	TU	Taylor 31-yard run (Rainey kick)	MEM 28–24
3	7:33	MEM	Gainwell 62-yard run (Patterson kick)	MEM 35–24
3	2:27	TU	Taylor 2-yard run (Rainey kick)	MEM 35–31
4	9:33	TU	JuanCarlos Santana 14-yard pass from Zach Smith (Rainey kick)	TU 38–35
4	5:14	TU	Rainey 26-yard field goal	TU 41–35
4	4:26	MEM	Gainwell 1-yard run (Patterson kick)	MEM 42–41

=== At Tulane ===
Team	1	2	3	4	Total
Golden Hurricane	0	16	0	10	26
• Green Wave	10	14	7	7	38

Scoring summary
1	9:05	TULANE	Merek Glover 31-yard field goal	TULANE 3–0
1	1:23	TULANE	Justin McMillan 5-yard run (Glover kick)	TULANE 10–0
2	13:11	TULSA	Corey Taylor II 1-yard run (Jacob Rainey kick)	TULANE 10–7
2	8:33	TULSA	Rainey 40-yard field goal	Tied 10–10
2	4:30	TULSA	Rainey 32-yard field goal	TULSA 13–10
2	2:05	TULANE	McMillan 1-yard run (Glover kick)	TULANE 17–13
2	1:52	TULANE	Willie Langham 13-yard fumble return (Glover kick)	TULANE 24–13
2	0:47	TULSA	Rainey 37-yard field goal	TULANE 24–16
3	10:40	TULANE	Stephon Huderson 32-yard pass from McMillan (Glover kick)	TULANE 31–16
4	14:54	TULSA	Keylon Stokes 16-yard pass from Zach Smith (Rainey kick)	TULANE 31–23
4	10:00	TULSA	Rainey 38-yard field goal	TULANE 31–26
4	4:53	TULANE	McMillan 1-yard run (Glover kick)	TULANE 38–26

=== UCF ===
Team	1	2	3	4	Total
Knights	14	14	3	0	31
• Golden Hurricane	7	10	7	10	34

Scoring summary
1	6:30	TU	Shamari Brooks 1-yard run (Jacob Rainey kick)	TU 7–0
1	4:23	UCF	Bentavious Thompson 1-yard run (Dylan Barnas kick)	Tied 7–7
1	1:32	UCF	Otis Anderson 2-yard run (Barnas kick)	UCF 14–7
2	12:44	TU	Rainey 31-yard field goal	UCF 14–10
2	11:51	UCF	Adrian Killins 57-yard run (Barnas kick)	UCF 21–10
2	6:35	TU	Keenen Johnson 35-yard pass from Zach Smith (Rainey kick)	UCF 21–17
2	0:11	UCF	Anderson 6-yard pass from Dillon Gabriel (Barnas kick)	UCF 28–17
3	5:16	TU	T.K. Wilkerson 2-yard run (Rainey kick)	UCF 28–24
3	0:37	UCF	Barnas 35-yard field goal	UCF 31–24
4	9:14	TU	Sam Crawford Jr. 17-yard pass from Seth Boomer (Rainey kick)	Tied 31–31
4	5:09	TU	Rainey 23-yard field goal	TU 34–31

=== Houston ===
Team	1	2	3	4	Total
• Cougars	0	14	3	7	24
Golden Hurricane	7	0	0	7	14

Scoring summary
1	6:02	TU	Sam Crawford Jr. 14-yard pass from Zach Smith (Jacob Rainey kick)	TU 7–0
2	12:23	HOU	Clayton Tune 15-yard run (Dalton Witherspoon kick)	Tied 7–7
2	1:34	HOU	Damarion Williams 25-yard Interception return (Witherspoon kick)	HOU 14–7
3	9:39	HOU	Witherspoon 23-yard field goal	HOU 17–7
4	13:58	TU	T.K. Wilkerson 1-yard run (Rainey kick)	HOU 17–14
4	13:45	HOU	Marquez Stevenson 94-yard kickoff return (Witherspoon kick)	HOU 24–14

=== At East Carolina ===
Team	1	2	3	4	Total
• Golden Hurricane	7	14	14	14	49
Pirates	3	0	7	14	24

Scoring summary
1	1:42	ECU	Jake Verity 51-yard field goal	ECU 3–0
1	1:06	TU	Sam Crawford Jr. 66-yard pass from Zach Smith (Jacob Rainey kick)	TU 7–3
2	12:09	TU	Keylon Stokes 29-yard pass from Smith (Rainey kick)	TU 14–3
2	4:45	TU	Keenen Johnson 4-yard pass from Smith (Rainey kick)	TU 21–3
3	11:40	TU	T.K. Wilkerson 10-yard run (Rainey kick)	TU 28–3
3	6:55	ECU	Blake Proehl 3-yard pass from Holton Ahlers (Verity kick)	TU 28–10
3	4:10	TU	Shamari Brooks 2-yard pass from Smith (Rainey kick)	TU 35–10
4	14:31	TU	Corey Taylor II 12-yard run (Rainey kick)	TU 42–10
4	11:17	ECU	C.J. Johnson 35-yard pass from Ahlers (Verity kick)	TU 42–17
4	6:36	TU	Ethan Hall 39-yard pass from Smith (Danny Donley kick)	TU 49–17
4	2:36	ECU	Proehl 34-yard pass from Ahlers (Verity kick)	TU 49–24

== Roster ==
2019 Tulsa Golden Hurricane football team roster
Players
Coaches
Offense

Pos.	#	Name	Class
WR	1	Josh Stewart	RJr
WR	2	Keylon Stokes	Jr
RB	3	Shamari Brooks	Jr
WR	4	Jarion Anderson	RSr
WR	5	JuanCarlos Santana	RSo
RB	6	Chris Lovick	Fr
QB	7	Davis Brin	RFr
WR	8	Keenen Johnson	Sr
WR	9	Sam Crawford Jr.	RSo
WR	10	Korey King	Fr
QB	11	Zach Smith	RJr
QB	12	Seth Boomer	RSo
WR	13	Josh Johnson	RSo
QB	15	Brandon Marquardt	RSo
WR	18	La'Darrion Florez	Fr
TE	19	Denzel Carter	Jr
WR	20	Cannon Montgomery	RSo
RB	21	T.K. Wilkerson	RFr
RB	24	Corey Taylor II	RJr
WR	25	Dhailon Phillips	Jr
RB	27	Elijah Lucas	RFr
TE	32	James Palmer	RFr
TE	38	Abe Anderson	RSo
WR	41	Andrew McKinnis	RJr
TE	44	Jordan Rodriguez	RSo
TE	47	Ethan Hall	Fr
OL	56	Tyler Smith	Fr
OL	62	Jake Coleman	RFr
OT	63	Judge Hartin	Sr
OT	65	Chris Ivy Jr.	RSr
C	66	Gerard Wheeler	RSo
G	68	Tiller Bucktrot	RJr
G	70	Clay Greathouse	RJr
OT	71	Chris Paul	RSo
C	73	Dylan Couch	RJr
OL	74	Jeremy Jones	Fr
G	75	Dante Bivens	RSo
OL	76	Chester Baah	Fr
C	77	Josh Owens	RFr
OT	78	X'Zauvea Gadlin	RFr
WR	80	Trey Collier	Fr
WR	82	Joseph Breedlove III	RSo
WR	84	Malik Rodgers	So
WR	85	Imiee Cooksey	RFr
WR	88	Malik Jackson	RSo

Defense

Pos.	#	Name	Class
S	3	Cristian Williams	RJr
LB	4	Robert Revels III	RJr
LB	6	Diamon Cannon	RSr
S	7	TieNeal Martin	Sr
S	8	Brandon Johnson	Sr
CB	9	Reggie Robinson	RSr
S	10	Manny Bunch	Sr
S	11	Keidrien Wadley	RSr
CB	12	Allie Green IV	Jr
S	13	Lamar Mullins	Jr
DE	15	Trevis Gipson	RSr
CB	16	Reggie Ellis	Fr
CB	18	Tyon Davis	RSo
LB	19	Grant Sawyer	So
S	20	Kendarin Ray	RFr
S	21	Bryson Powers	RSo
S	22	Marcus Mays	RSo
LB	23	Zaven Collins	RSo
LB	24	Treyvon Reeves	RJr
S	25	Jaise Oliver	Fr
CB	26	Akayleb Evans	Jr
S	27	Daiquain Jackson	RSo
S	28	Jett Hendrix	RFr
CB	29	Ryan Nixon	So
LB	30	Justin Wright	RFr
CB	33	Josiah Wilson	RFr
LB	35	Yohance Burnett	RJr
DB	39	Mike Garrett Jr.	Jr
LB	40	Mitchell Kulkin	RFr
LB	41	Dorian Hopkins	Fr
LB	42	Cooper Edmiston	Sr
DT	44	Cade Baumann	RJr
LB	46	Bershard Glaspie	Fr
LB	49	Joseph Anderson	RFr
DT	54	Shemarr Robinson	Sr
DE	58	Deven Lamp	RSo
DL	88	RaQuan Thompson	Fr
DT	90	Jaxon Player	So
DE	91	Cullen Wick	RJr
DL	92	Darrias Murdock	Fr
DT	93	JaJuan Blankenship	RJr
LB	94	Anthony Goodlow	RFr
DL	95	Cooper Laake	Fr
DT	97	Tyarise Stevenson	RJr
DE	98	Lazarus May	Fr

Special teams

Pos.	#	Name	Class
P	33	Thomas Bennett	RSr
LS	42	Adam Higuera	Jr
K	90	Zack Long	Jr
K	95	Jacob Rainey	RFr
K	98	Kevin Neitzke	RJr
K	99	Danny Donley	RSr

Head coach

- Philip Montgomery (Tarleton State)

Coordinators/assistant coaches

- Joseph Gillespie (Angelo State)
  Defensive coordinator, linebackers
- Jermial Ashley (Kansas)
  Defensive line coach
- Mike Bloesch (Houston)
  Offensive line coach
- Carlton Buckels (LSU)
  Safeties coach
- Aaron Fletcher (East Texas A&M)
  Cornerbacks coach
- Justin Hill (Rice)
  Running backs coach
- Calvin Lowry (Penn State)
  Receivers coach
- Luke Olson (Southern Nazarene)
  Nickel safeties coach
- Jordan Najvar (Baylor)
  Tight ends coach
- Beau Trahan (Texas)
  Quarterbacks coach
- Grant Lester (Oklahoma)
  Offensive quality control
- Craig Suits (Tulsa)
  Defensive quality control
- Paul Cherry (Kansas)
  Quality Control
- Josh Atkinson (Tulsa)
  Offensive graduate assistant
- Mookie Carlile
  Defensive graduate assistant
- Nick Franey
  Offensive graduate assistant
- Hunter Ramsey
  Defensive graduate assistant
- Ravi Savitala (UC Santa Cruz)
  Co-Director of football operations/External
- Diane McPheeters (Baylor)
  Co-Director of football operations/Internal
- Dan Bitson (Tulsa)
  Director of player personnel & development
- Keith Smith (Shepherd University)
  Director of football video operations
- Tom Ososkie
  Director of scouting
- Sam Lazarus (Tulsa)
  Director of creative media

Legend

- (C) Team captain
- (S) Suspended
- (I) Ineligible
- Injured
- Redshirt

Roster

== Players drafted into the NFL ==
The following Golden Hurricane players were selected in the 2020 NFL draft following the season.

Round	Pick	Player	Position	NFL club
4	123	Reggie Robinson	Cornerback	Dallas Cowboys
5	155	Trevis Gipson	Defensive end	Chicago Bears
