= Philip Montgomery =

American football player and coach (born 1971)

Current position
- Title: Associate head coach and wide receivers coach
- Team: Mississippi State
- Conference: SEC

Biographical details
- Born: December 21, 1971 (age 54); Dallas, Texas, U.S.

Playing career
- 1990–1993: Tarleton State
- Positions: Quarterback, free safety

Coaching career (HC unless noted)
- 1994: Tarleton State (SA)
- 1995: Celeste HS (TX) (OC/QB/RB)
- 1996: Stephenville JR HS (TX) (QB/RB)
- 1997–2001: Stephenville HS (TX) (QB/RB)
- 2002: Denton HS (TX) (OC)
- 2003–2006: Houston (QB/RB)
- 2007: Houston (co-OC/QB/RB)
- 2008–2011: Baylor (co-OC/QB/RB)
- 2012–2014: Baylor (OC/QB)
- 2015–2022: Tulsa
- 2023: Auburn (OC/QB)
- 2024: Birmingham Stallions (co-OC)
- 2025: Virginia Tech (OC)
- 2025: Virginia Tech (interim HC)
- 2026–present: Mississippi State (AHC/WR)

Head coaching record
- Overall: 46–59
- Bowls: 2–2

Philip Montgomery (born December 21, 1971) is an American college football coach and former player who currently serves as the associate head coach for offense and wide receivers coach for Mississippi State. He served as the head football coach at the University of Tulsa from 2015 to 2022.

== Career ==
Montgomery was the offensive coordinator of the Baylor Bears from 2008 to 2014 In 2013, Montgomery was a finalist for the Broyles Award, given annually to the nation's top college football assistant coach. He played collegiately at Tarleton State University with the likes of Kevin Vickers, Ryland Bailey and Chad Martinka.

On December 11, 2014, Montgomery was hired as the 33rd head coach at the Tulsa Golden Hurricane. In 2020, after a three-year bowl skid, Tulsa made it to their first ever AAC Championship game against Cincinnati. Tulsa fired Montgomery on November 27, 2022, following eight seasons. Montgomery's record was 43–53.

Auburn hired Montgomery as offensive coordinator for the 2023 season under new head coach Hugh Freeze. Auburn fired Montgomery after the season. In 2024, he served as offensive coordinator for the Birmingham Stallions of the United Football League. In February 2025, Virginia Tech hired Montgomery as offensive coordinator, replacing Tyler Bowen. Virginia Tech named him as interim head coach on September 14, 2025, following the firing of Brent Pry. Montgomery was hired as the associate head coach for offense and wide receivers coach at Mississippi State in 2026.

== Head coaching record ==
| Year | Team | Overall | Conference | Standing | Bowl/playoffs |
|---|---|---|---|---|---|
Tulsa Golden Hurricane (American Athletic Conference) (2015–2022)
| 2015 | Tulsa | 6–7 | 3–5 | 4th (West) | L Independence |
| 2016 | Tulsa | 10–3 | 6–2 | 2nd (West) | W Miami Beach |
| 2017 | Tulsa | 2–10 | 1–7 | 6th (West) | |
| 2018 | Tulsa | 3–9 | 2–6 | T–5th (West) | |
| 2019 | Tulsa | 4–8 | 2–6 | T–5th (West) | |
| 2020 | Tulsa | 6–3 | 6–0 | T–1st | L Armed Forces |
| 2021 | Tulsa | 7–6 | 5–3 | T–3rd | W Myrtle Beach |
| 2022 | Tulsa | 5–7 | 3–5 | T–8th | |
| Tulsa: | | 43–53 | 28–34 | | |
Virginia Tech Hokies (Atlantic Coast Conference) (2025)
| 2025 | Virginia Tech | 3–6 (Note: Brent Pry was fired after three games with an 0–3 record. Montgomery took over for the rest of the season as interim head coach.) | 2–6 | T–13th | |
| Virginia Tech: | | 3–6 | 2–6 | | |
| Total: | | 46–59 | | | |
National championship Conference title Conference division title or championship game berth
