= 2022 Tulsa Golden Hurricane football team =

College football season

2022 Tulsa Golden Hurricane football
- Conference: American Athletic Conference
- Record: 5–7 (3–5 AAC)
- Head coach: Philip Montgomery (8th season)
- Offensive scheme: Veer and shoot
- Defensive coordinator: Luke Olson (1st season)
- Base defense: 3–3–5
- Home stadium: Skelly Field at H. A. Chapman Stadium

2022 American Athletic Conference football standings
	Conf.			Overall
Team	W		L	W		L
No. 9 Tulane y$	7	–	1	12	–	2
UCF y	6	–	2	9	–	5
Cincinnati	6	–	2	9	–	4
SMU	5	–	3	7	–	6
Houston	5	–	3	8	–	5
East Carolina	4	–	4	8	–	5
Navy	4	–	4	4	–	8
Memphis	3	–	5	7	–	6
Tulsa	3	–	5	5	–	7
Temple	1	–	7	3	–	9
South Florida	0	–	8	1	–	11
Championship: Tulane 45, UCF 28
$ – Conference champion; y – Championship game participant; Rankings from AP Poll

The 2022 Tulsa Golden Hurricane football team represented the University of Tulsa as a member of the American Athletic Conference (AAC) during the 2022 NCAA Division I FBS football season. The Golden Hurricane were led by eighth-year head coach Philip Montgomery and played their home games at Skelly Field at H. A. Chapman Stadium in Tulsa, Oklahoma.

== Schedule ==
Date	Time	Opponent	Site	TV	Result	Attendance
September 3	2:30 p.m.	at Wyoming*	War Memorial Stadium; Laramie, WY	FS1	L 37–40 ^{2OT}	20,574
September 10	6:00 p.m.	Northern Illinois*	Skelly Field at H. A. Chapman Stadium; Tulsa, OK	ESPN+	W 38–35	22,113
September 17	6:00 p.m.	Jacksonville State*	Skelly Field at H. A. Chapman Stadium; Tulsa, OK	ESPN+	W 54–17	17,311
September 24	3:00 p.m.	at No. 16 Ole Miss*	Vaught–Hemingway Stadium; Oxford, MS	SECN	L 27–35	60,641
October 1	6:00 p.m.	Cincinnati	Skelly Field at H. A. Chapman Stadium; Tulsa, OK	ESPNU	L 21–31	21,111
October 8	2:30 p.m.	at Navy	Navy–Marine Corps Memorial Stadium; Annapolis, MD	CBSSN	L 21–53	30,658
October 21	6:30 p.m.	at Temple	Lincoln Financial Field; Philadelphia, PA	ESPN2	W 27–16	13,607
October 29	2:30 p.m.	SMU	Skelly Field at H. A. Chapman Stadium; Tulsa, OK	ESPN+	L 34–45	22,993
November 5	11:00 a.m.	No. 19 Tulane	Skelly Field at H. A. Chapman Stadium; Tulsa, OK	ESPNU	L 13–27	15,122
November 10	6:30 p.m.	at Memphis	Simmons Bank Liberty Stadium; Memphis, TN	ESPN	L 10–26	23,980
November 18	8:00 p.m.	South Florida	Skelly Field at H. A. Chapman Stadium; Tulsa, OK	ESPN2	W 48–42	13,819
November 26	6:30 p.m.	at Houston	TDECU Stadium; Houston, TX	ESPNU	W 37–30	21,785
*Non-conference game; Rankings from AP Poll released prior to the game; All times are in Central time

== Game summaries ==
=== At Wyoming ===
Uniform Combination
Helmet	Jersey	Pants

Tulsa Golden Hurricane (0–0) at Wyoming Cowboys (0–0)

Quarter	1	2	3	4	OT	2OT	Total
Tulsa	3	17	7	7	3	0	37
Wyoming	10	7	7	10	3	3	40

at War Memorial Stadium • Laramie, WY

- Date: Saturday, September 3, 2022
- Game time: 2:30 p.m. CST
- Game weather: Sunny • Temperature: 84 °F (29 °C)
- Game attendance: 20,574
- Referee: Jon Noli
- TV announcers (FS2/FS1): Eric Collins, Devin Gardner

Game information

First quarter

- (14:23) WYO – Easton Gibbs 0 yard fumble return, John Hoyland kick (Wyoming 7–0)
- (9:02) TLSA – Zack Long 32 yard field goal (Drive: 13 plays, 62 yards, 5:21; Wyoming 7–3)
- (0:54) WYO – John Hoyland 25 yard field goal (Drive: 13 plays, 67 yards, 8:08; Wyoming 10–3)

Second quarter

- (8:27) TLSA – Steven Anderson 1 yard run, Zack Long kick (Drive: 11 plays, 77 yards, 4:47; Tied 10–10)
- (2:48) TLSA – Zack Long 27 yard field goal (Drive: 10 plays, 86 yards, 3:56; Tulsa 13–10)
- (0:57) WYO – Will Pelissier 48 yard pass from Andrew Peasley, John Hoyland kick (Drive: 6 plays, 75 yards, 1:51; Wyoming 17–13)
- (0:08) TLSA – Malachai Jones 5 yard pass from Davis Brin, Zack Long kick (Drive: 5 plays, 75 yards, 0:49; Tulsa 20–17)

Third quarter

- (12:12) WYO – Ryan Marquez 9 yard blocked punt return, John Hoyland kick (Wyoming 24–20)
- (8:12) TLSA – JuanCarlos Santana 41 yard pass from Davis Brin, Zack Long kick (Drive: 9 plays, 75 yards, 4:00; Tulsa 27–24)

Fourth quarter

- (14:54) TLSA – Keylon Stokes 19 yard pass from Davis Brin, Zack Long kick (Drive: 8 plays, 55 yards, 3:17; Tulsa 34–24)
- (10:53) WYO – John Hoyland 55 yard field goal (Drive: 8 plays 37 yards, 4:01; Tulsa 34–27)
- (6:19) WYO – Joshua Cobbs 51 yard pass from Andrew Peasley, John Hoyland kick (Drive: 3 plays, 69 yards, 1:27; Tied 34–34)

1st Overtime

- TLSA – Zack Long 25 yard field goal (Drive: 5 plays, 18 yards; Tulsa 37–34)
- WYO – John Hoyland 25 yard field goal (Drive: 6 plays, 19 yards; Tied 37–37)

2nd Overtime

- WYO – John Hoyland 30 yard field goal (Drive: 6 plays, 12 yards; Wyoming 40–37)

Statistics	TLSA	WYO
First downs	25	17
Plays–yards	89–521	72–399
Rushes–yards	32–61	37–143
Passing yards	460	256
Passing: comp–att–int	30–52–0	20–30–0
Time of possession	30:45	29:15

Team	Category	Player	Statistics
Tulsa	Passing	Davis Brin	30/52, 460 yards, 3 TD
Tulsa	Rushing	Steven Anderson	10 carries, 40 yards, 1 TD
Tulsa	Receiving	Keylon Stokes	11 receptions, 169 yards, 1 TD
Wyoming	Passing	Andrew Peasley	20/30, 256 yards, 2 TD
Wyoming	Rushing	Andrew Peasley	10 carries, 45 yards
Wyoming	Receiving	Joshua Cobbs	5 receptions, 77 yards, 1 TD

=== Northern Illinois ===
Uniform Combination
Helmet	Jersey	Pants

Game Two – Northern Illinois Huskies (1–0) at Tulsa Golden Hurricane (0–1)

Quarter	1	2	3	4	Total
Huskies	0	7	14	14	35
Golden Hurricane	7	17	0	14	38

at Skelly Field at H. A. Chapman Stadium • Tulsa, OK

- Date: Saturday, September 10, 2022
- Game time: 6:00 p.m. CST
- Game weather: Sunny • Temperature: 88 °F (31 °C) • Wind: NW 5
- Game attendance: 22,113
- Referee: Jeremy Valentine
- TV announcers (ESPN+): James Westling, LaDarrin McLane

Game information

First quarter

- (10:13) TLSA – JuanCarlos Santana 14 yard pass from Davis Brin, Zack Long kick (Drive: 12 plays, 75 yards, 4:47; Tulsa 7–0)

Second quarter

- (13:02) TLSA – Zack Long 28 yard field goal (Drive: 10 plays, 30 yards, 4:41; Tulsa 10–0)
- (8:15) TLSA – JuanCarlos Santana 25 yard pass from Davis Brin, Zack Long kick (Drive:8 plays, 71 yards, 3:11; Tulsa 17–0)
- (2:17) NIU – Kacper Rutkiewicz 9 yard pass from Rocky Lombardi, John Richardson kick (Drive: 6 plays, 44 yards, 2:50; Tulsa 17–7)
- (0:49) TLSA – Isaiah Epps 20 yard pass from Davis Brin, Zack Long kick (Drive: 4 plays, 69 yards, 1:22; Tulsa 24–7)

Third quarter

- (11:44) NIU – Kacper Rutkiewicz 30 yard pass from Rocky Lombardi, John Richardson kick (Drive: 6 plays, 75 yards, 3:16; Tulsa 24–14)
- (8:54) NIU – Antario Brown 8 yard run, John Richardson kick (Drive: 7 plays, 54 yards, 2:48; Tulsa 24–21)

Fourth quarter

- (14:50) NIU – Cole Tucker 33 yard pass from Rocky Lombardi, John Richardson kick (Drive: 8 plays, 78 yards, 4:18; Northern Illinois 28–24)
- (10:36) TLSA – Keylon Stokes 1 yard pass from Davis Brin, Zack Long kick (Drive: 10 plays, 75 yards, 4:14; Tulsa 31–28)
- (5:57) NIU – Rocky Lombardi 1 yard run, John Richardson kick (Drive: 7 plays, 40 yards, 3:40; Northern Illinois 35–31)
- (0:58) TLSA – Steven Anderson 1 yard run, Zack Long kick (Drive: 5 plays, 52 yards, 0:56; Tulsa 38–35)

Statistics	NIU	TLSA
First downs	19	23
Plays–yards	68–385	69–429
Rushes–yards	37–126	37–107
Passing yards	259	322
Passing: comp–att–int	18–31–1	19–32–1
Time of possession	32:02	27:58

Team	Category	Player	Statistics
Northern Illinois	Passing	Rocky Lombardi	18/31, 259 yards, 3 TD, 1 INT
Northern Illinois	Rushing	Antario Brown	20 carries, 73 yards, 1 TD
Northern Illinois	Receiving	Cole Tucker	7 receptions, 123 yards, 1 TD
Tulsa	Passing	Davis Brin	19/32, 322 yards, 4 TD, 1 INT
Tulsa	Rushing	Steven Anderson	18 carries, 58 yards, 1 TD
Tulsa	Receiving	Keylon Stokes	8 receptions, 135 yards, 1 TD

=== Jacksonville State ===
Uniform Combination
Helmet	Jersey	Pants

Game Three – Jacksonville State Gamecocks (3–0) at Tulsa Golden Hurricane (1–1)

Quarter	1	2	3	4	Total
Gamecocks	0	3	7	7	17
Golden Hurricane	12	28	7	7	54

at Skelly Field at H. A. Chapman Stadium • Tulsa, OK

- Date: Saturday, September 17, 2022
- Game time: 6:00 p.m. CST
- Game weather: Cloudy • Temperature: 94 °F (34 °C) • Wind: S 13
- Game attendance: 17,311
- Referee: Edwin Lee
- TV announcers (ESPN+): James Westling, Taylor McHargue
- ;First quarter
  - (8:27) TLSA – Steven Anderson 4 yard run, Zack Long kick (Drive: 14 plays, 75 yards, 6:33; Tulsa 7–0)
  - (3:17) TLSA – Team safety (Tulsa 9–0)
  - (1:19) TLSA – Zack Long 44 yard field goal (Drive: 6 plays, 49 yards, 1:58; Tulsa 12–0)
  Second quarter
  - (11:08) TLSA – Steven Anderson 4 yard run, Zack Long kick (Drive: 8 plays, 62 yards, 3:05; Tulsa 19–0)
  - (8:27) TLSA – Jordan Ford 7 yard pass from Davis Brin, Zack Long kick (Drive: 5 plays, 72 yards, 1:48; Tulsa 26–0)
  - (5:04) TLSA – JuanCarlos Santana 31 yard pass from Davis Brin, Zack Long kick (Drive: 6 plays, 64 yards, 2:22; Tulsa 33–0)
  - (2:05) JSU – Alen Karajic 46 yard field goal (Drive: 11 plays, 47 yards, 2:59; Tulsa 33–3)
  - (1:23) TLSA – Isaiah Epps 17 yard pass from Davis Brin, Zack Long kick (Drive: 3 plays, 79 yards, 0:37; Tulsa 40–3)
  Third quarter
  - (10:43) JSU – Zion Webb 3 yard run, Alen Karajic kick (Drive: 12 plays, 75 yards, 4:17; Tulsa 40–10)
  - (6:05) TLSA – Keylon Stokes 46 yard pass from Davis Brin, Zack Long kick (Drive: 2 plays, 47 yards, 0:42; Tulsa 47–10)
  Fourth quarter
  - (9:27) TLSA – Marquis Shoulders 11 yard pass from Braylon Braxton, Zack Long kick (Drive: 6 plays, 64 yards, 3:29; Tulsa 54–10)
  - (5:29) JSU – Te'Sean Smoot 16 yard run, Alen Karajic kick (Drive: 11 plays, 65 yards, 3:58; Tulsa 54–17)

Statistics	JSU	TLSA
First downs	17	29
Plays–yards	67–295	77–621
Rushes–yards	50–208	36–164
Passing yards	87	457
Passing: comp–att–int	7–17–1	32–41–0
Time of possession	24:00	36:00

Team	Category	Player	Statistics
Jacksonville State	Passing	Aaron McLaughlin	3/6, 47 yards, 1 INT
Jacksonville State	Rushing	Matt LaRoche	15 carries, 67 yards
Jacksonville State	Receiving	Michael Pettway	4 receptions, 47 yards
Tulsa	Passing	Davis Brin	27/35, 424 yards, 4 TD
Tulsa	Rushing	Bill Jackson	9 carries, 59 yards
Tulsa	Receiving	Keylon Stokes	9 receptions, 153 yards, 1 TD

=== At No. 16 Ole Miss ===
Uniform Combination
Helmet	Jersey	Pants

Game Four – Tulsa Golden Hurricane (2–1) at No. 16 Ole Miss Rebels (3–0)

Quarter	1	2	3	4	Total
Golden Hurricane	14	3	3	7	27
No. 16 Rebels	7	28	0	0	35

at Vaught–Hemingway Stadium • Oxford, MS

- Date: Saturday, September 24, 2022
- Game time: 4:00 p.m.
- Game weather: Sunny • Temperature: 90 °F (32 °C) • Wind: N 5
- Game attendance: 60,641
- Referee: James Carter
- TV announcers (SECN): Dave Neal (play-by-play), Deuce McAllister (color), and Marilyn Payne (sideline)

Game information

First quarter

- (13:21) MISS – Zach Evans 20 yard run, Jonathan Cruz kick (Drive:
- (7:55) TLSA – Davis Brin 1 yard run (Drive:
- (3:17) TLSA – Isaiah Epps 20 yard pass from Davis Brin, Zack Long kick (Drive:

Second quarter

- (14:25) MISS – Quinshon Judkins 4 yard run, Jonathan Cruz kick (Drive:
- (10:31) MISS – Malik Heath 31 yard pass from Jaxson Dart, Jonathan Cruz kick (Drive:
- (5:01) MISS – Quinshon Judkins 1 yard run, Jonathan Cruz kick (Drive:
- (1:25) MISS – Jonathan Mingo 31 yard pass from Jaxson Dart, Jonathan Cruz kick (Drive:
- (0:00) TLSA – Zack Long 28 yard field goal (Drive:

Third quarter

- (10:16) TLSA – Zack Long 20 yard field goal (Drive:

Fourth quarter

- (14:38) TLSA – Isaiah Epps 17 yard pass from Braylon Braxton, Zack Long kick (Drive:

Statistics	TLSA	MISS
First downs	26	27
Plays–yards	77–457	75–462
Rushes–yards	43–262	51–308
Passing yards	195	154
Passing: comp–att–int	16–34–1	13–24–0
Time of possession	34:13	25:47

Team	Category	Player	Statistics
Tulsa	Passing	Davis Brin	7/13, 112 yards, 1 TD
Tulsa	Rushing	Bill Jackson	8 carries, 77 yards
Tulsa	Receiving	Isaiah Epps	4 receptions, 62 yards, 2 TD
Ole Miss	Passing	Jaxson Dart	13/24, 154 yards, 2 TD
Ole Miss	Rushing	Quinshon Judkins	27 carries, 140 yards, 2 TD
Ole Miss	Receiving	Malik Heath	4 receptions 75 yards, 1 TD

=== Cincinnati ===
Game Five – Cincinnati Bearcats at Tulsa Golden Hurricane

Quarter	1	2	3	4	Total
Bearcats	14	10	7	0	31
Golden Hurricane	7	7	7	0	21

at Skelly Field at H. A. Chapman Stadium • Tulsa, Oklahoma

- Date: Saturday, October 1, 2022
- Game time: 6:00 p.m. CDT (7:00 EDT)
- Game weather: Sunny • Temperature: 81 °F (27 °C) • Wind: NE 6 mph
- Game attendance: 21,111
- Referee: Hank Johns
- TV announcers (ESPNU): Jay Alter (play-by-play) and Hutson Mason (analyst)
- ESPN After defeating Indiana to complete their non conference slate, The Bearcats traveled west to open conference play at Tulsa. This was the Bearcats first visit to Tulsa since 2016, A 40-37 overtime loss to end the season. After a brief but ineffective opening drive, the Bearcats punted the ball to Tulsa. The defense wasted little time in showing that they were going to be factor and the Pace brothers were factors. 3 plays in to the Golden Hurricanes initial drive QB Davis Brin was hurried by LB Ivan Pace Jr. and tried to get a throw off to avoid a sack but the weak throw was intercepted by DeShawn Pace who weaved his way back 18 yards with the stolen loaf to score and give the Bearcats a 7-0 lead. Unfazed, the Golden Hurricane responded with a 14 play 79 yard drive to tie the game with a 2 yard run by Braylon Braxton. After an exchange of punts, the Bearcats went for the quick strike score as Ben Bryant found a wide open Tyler Scott for a 61 yard score on the first play of the first play of their 3rd possession. The Bearcats took a 14-7 lead into 2nd quarter. After a 31 yard punt return by Ryan Montgomery set the Bearcats up in excellent field position inside the Tulsa 25, only 3 plays were needed before sophomore running back Corey Kiner busted up the middle nearly untouched on a 4th and 1 for a 19 yard scoring run. The Bearcats were now up two scores at 21-7. Despite Tulsa closing the gap back to 7, The Bearcats added a 39 yard field goal by Ryan Coe at the halftime gun and took a 24-14 lead. Both teams exchanged 70+ yard touchdown drives on their initial possessions of the 3rd quarter. Tulsa's Deneric Prince scoring his second touchdown from 2 yards out and Josh Wylie snagging a short pass from Ben Bryant on 4th down for a score to push the Bearcat lead back to 10 at 31-21. Neither team would score again, though the BlackCats defense came up with a critical stop inside its own 5 in the 4th quarter after Bryant was intercepted inside his own 25. The story though was the BlackCats defense who made life miserable for Tulsa QB Davis Brin, sacking him 10 times, and recording 11 sacks overall. Senior DL Jabari Taylor led the barrage with 2 ½ sacks with 9 other players registering sacks on Tulsa QB's. The 31-21 win was the Bearcats 17th consecutive win over AAC opponents, gave the Bearcats an 18-17-2 lead in the overall series and their 4th straight over the Golden Hurricane.

Game information

First quarter

- (10:23) Cincinnati – Deshawn Pace 18 yard interception, Ryan Coe kick (Cincinnati 7-0)
- (4:55) Tulsa – Braylon Braxton 2 yard rush, Zack Long kick (Drive: 14 plays, 79 yards, 5:23; Tied 7–7)
- (0:27) Cincinnati – Tyler Scott 61 yard pass from Ben Bryant, Ryan Coe kick (Drive: 1 play, 61 yards, 0:10; Cincinnati 14–7)

Second quarter

- (6:49) Cincinnati – Corey Kiner 19 yard rush, Ryan Coe kick (Drive: 14 plays, 79 yards, 5:23; Cincinnati 21–7)
- (1:20) Tulsa – Deneric Prince 8 yard rush, Zack Long kick (Drive: 3 plays, 61 yards, 0:37; Cincinnati 21–14)
- (0:00) Cincinnati – Ryan Coe 39 yard field goal (Drive: 9 plays, 54 yards, 1:20; Cincinnati 24–14)

Third quarter

- (11:09) Tulsa – Deneric Prince 2 yard rush, Zack Long kick (Drive: 8 plays, 75 yards, 3:51; Cincinnati 24–21)
- (14:01) Cincinnati – Josh Whyle 2 yard pass from Ben Bryant, Ryan Coe kick (Drive: 5 plays, 70 yards, 2:32; Cincinnati 31–21)

Fourth quarter

Statistics	CIN	TLS
First downs	15	23
Plays–yards	59–364	83–285
Rushes–yards	32–198	45–36
Passing yards	166	249
Passing: comp–att–int	15–27–1	19–38–2
Time of possession	25:00	35:00

Team	Category	Player	Statistics
Cincinnati	Passing	Ben Bryant	15–27, 166 yards, 2 TD, 1 INT
Cincinnati	Rushing	Corey Kiner	12 carries, 106 yards, 1 TD
Cincinnati	Receiving	Tyler Scott	5 receptions, 77 yards, 1 TD
Tulsa	Passing	Davis Brin	18–36, 237 yards
Tulsa	Rushing	Deneric Prince	18 carries, 71 yards, 2 TD
Tulsa	Receiving	Keylon Stokes	6 receptions, 106 yards

=== At Navy ===
Tulsa Golden Hurricane at Navy Midshipmen

Team	1	2	3	4	Total
Golden Hurricane	7	7	0	7	21
• Midshipmen	10	26	10	7	53

- Date: October 8, 2022
- Location: Navy–Marine Corps Memorial Stadium
  Annapolis, MD
- Game start: 3:37 p.m.
- Elapsed time: 3 hours, 29 minutes
- Game attendance: 30,658
- Game weather: 58 °F (14 °C) • Weather: Clear • Wind: NW 10 MPH
- Referee: Kevin Randell
- TV announcers (CBSSN): John Sadak (play-by-play), Randy Cross (analyst), and Sheehan Stanwick Burch (sideline)

Scoring summary
1	5:10	NAVY	Daniel Davies 25–yard field goal (7 plays, 57 yards, 3:35)	NAVY 3–0
1	2:25	NAVY	Nathan Kent 70–yard run (Daniel Davies kick) (1 play, 85 yards, 0:20)	NAVY 10–0
1	0:43	TULSA	Malachai Jones 22–yard pass from Davis Brin (Zack Long kick) (5 plays, 75 yards, 1:42)	NAVY 10–7
2	13:41	NAVY	Daba Fofana 47–yard run (Daniel Davies kick) (4 plays, 72 yards, 2:02)	NAVY 17–7
2	10:57	NAVY	Daba Fofana 15–yard run (Daniel Davies kick) (3 plays, 22 yards, 1:18)	NAVY 24–7
2	10:07	NAVY	Team Safety (3 plays, -5 yards, 0:50)	NAVY 26–7
2	3:57	NAVY	Daba Fofana 11–yard run (Daniel Davies kick) (7 plays, 34 yards, 3:19)	NAVY 33–7
2	3:21	TULSA	Keylon Stokes 76-yard pass from Davis Brin (Zack Long kick) (2 plays, 75 yards, 0:36)	NAVY 33–14
2	0:11	NAVY	Daniel Davies 46–yard field goal (14 plays, 46 yards, 3:10)	NAVY 36–14
3	10:06	NAVY	Tai Lavatai 26-yard pass from Kai Puail-Rojas (Daniel Davies kick) (9 plays, 75 yards, 4:54)	NAVY 43–14
3	1:33	NAVY	Daniel Davies 34-yard field goal (11 plays, 75 yards, 3:16)	NAVY 46–14
4	13:27	TULSA	Steven Anderson 1-yard run (Zack Long kick) (11 plays, 75 yards, 3:16)	NAVY 46–21
4	3:52	NAVY	Vincent Terrell Jr. 3-yard run (Daniel Davies kick) (6 plays, 35 yards, 3:44)	NAVY 53–21

Statistics	Tulsa	Navy
First downs	14	24
Plays–yards	51–309	77–490
Rushes–yards	18–25	69–455
Passing yards	284	35
Passing: comp–att–int	20–33–3	2–8–0
Time of possession	19:34	40:26

Team	Category	Player	Statistics
Tulsa	Passing	Davis Brin	20–31, 284 yards, 2 TD, 2 INT
Tulsa	Rushing	Bill Jackson	3 carries, 18 yards
Tulsa	Receiving	Keylon Stokes	7 receptions, 152 yards, 1 TD
Navy	Passing	Kai Puailoa-Rojas	1–1, 26 yards, 1 TD
Navy	Rushing	Daba Fofana	21 carries, 159 yards, 3 TD
Navy	Receiving	Tai Lavatai	1 reception, 26 yards, 1 TD

=== At Temple ===
	1	2	3	4	Total
Golden Hurricane	0	14	0	13	27
Owls	10	0	0	6	16

=== SMU ===
SMU Mustangs at Tulsa Golden Hurricane – Game summary

Quarter	1	2	3	4	Total
Mustangs	14	10	21	0	45
Golden Hurricane	7	0	13	14	34

at Skelly Field at H. A. Chapman Stadium, Tulsa, Oklahoma

- Date: October 29
- Game time: 2:30 p.m. CDT
- Game weather: Cloudy, 64 °F (18 °C)
- Game attendance: 22,993
- Referee: Tim Rich
- TV announcers (ESPN+): Richard Cross and Taylor McHargue
- Box score, Recap

Game information

First quarter

- SMU – Rashee Rice 75-yard pass from Preston Stone (Collin Rogers kick), 14:48. Mustangs 7–0. Drive: 1 play, 75 yards, 0:12.
- SMU – Tyler Lavine 1-yard run (Collin Rogers kick), 10:12. Mustangs 14–0. Drive: 9 plays, 53 yards, 3:05.
- TLSA – Isaiah Epps 7-yard pass from Davis Brin (Zack Long kick), 7:37. Mustangs 14–7. Drive: 8 plays, 75 yards, 2:35.

Second quarter

- SMU – Tyler Lavine 1-yard run (Collin Rogers kick), 11:49. Mustangs 21–7. Drive: 11 plays, 64 yards, 3:40.
- SMU – Collin Rogers 34-yard field goal, 0:00. Mustangs 24–7. Drive: 16 plays, 43 yards, 8:14.

Third quarter

- TLSA – Braylon Braxton 1-yard run (kick blocked), 11:54. Mustangs 24–13. Drive: 8 plays, 75 yards, 3:06.
- SMU – Tyler Lavine 2-yard run (Collin Rogers kick), 9:32. Mustangs 31–13. Drive: 6 plays, 74 yards, 2:16.
- TLSA – Davis Brin 21-yard run (Zack Long kick), 7:00. Mustangs 31–20. Drive: 7 plays, 75 yards, 2:32.
- SMU – Rashee Rice 6-yard pass from Preston Stone (Collin Rogers kick), 1:04. Mustangs 38–20. Drive: 11 plays, 75 yards, 5:49.
- SMU – Elijah Chatman 0-yard fumble return (Collin Rogers kick), 0:55. Mustangs 45–20.

Fourth quarter

- TLSA – Keylon Stokes 50-yard pass from Braylon Braxton (Zack Long kick), 14:42. Mustangs 45–27. Drive: 5 plays, 75 yards, 1:31.
- TLSA – Jordan Ford 9-yard pass from Braylon Braxton (Zack Long kick), 8:08. Mustangs 45–34. Drive: 13 plays, 57 yards, 4:59.

Top passers

- SMU – Preston Stone – 11/17, 219 yards, TD
- TLSA – Braylon Braxton – 8/14, 120 yards, 2 TD

Top rushers

- SMU – Tyler Lavine – 17 rushes, 72 yards, 3 TD
- TLSA – Deneric Prince – 19 rushes, 86 yards

Top receivers

- SMU – Rashee Rice – 9 receptions, 180 yards, 2 TD
- TLSA – Keylon Stokes – 5 receptions, 122 yards, TD

=== No. 19 Tulane ===
No. 19 Tulane Green Wave (7–1) at Tulsa Golden Hurricane (3–5) – Game summary

Quarter	1	2	3	4	Total
No. 19 Green Wave	10	7	7	3	27
Golden Hurricanes	3	7	3	0	13

at Skelly Field at H. A. Chapman Stadium • Tulsa, OK

- Date: November 5, 2022
- Game time: 11:00 a.m.
- Game weather: Sunny, 57 °F (14 °C)
- Game attendance: 15,122
- Referee: Hank Johns
- TV announcers (ESPNU): John Schiffren (play-by-play) and Rene Ingoglia (analyst)

Game information

First quarter

- (12:39) TUL – Tyrick James 10-yard pass from Michael Pratt, Valentino Ambrosio kick (Drive: 7 plays, 78 yards, 2:17; Tulane 7–0)
- (8:45) TLSA – Zack Long 46-yard field goal (Drive: 9 plays, 47 yards, 3:54; Tulane 7–3)
- (3:19) TUL – Valentino Ambrosio 20-yard field goal (Drive: 11 plays, 70 yards, 5:20; Tulane 10–3)

Second quarter

- (6:10) TUL – Tyjae Spears 34-yard run, Valentino Ambrosio kick (Drive: 9 plays, 88 yards, 3:55; Tulane 17–3)
- (0:59) TLSA – JuanCarlos Santana 28-yard pass from Braylon Baxter, Zack Long kick (Drive: 2 plays, 29 yards, 0:11; Tulane 17–10)

Third quarter

- (9:09) TUL – Shae Wyatt 20-yard pass from Michael Pratt, Valentino Ambrosio kick (Drive: 9 plays, 87 yards, 3:31; Tulane 24–10)
- (4:35) TLSA – Zack Long 40-yard field goal (Drive: 12 plays, 53 yards, 4:34; Tulane 24–13)

Fourth quarter

- (0:51) TUL – Valentino Ambrosio 33-yard field goal (Drive: 12 plays, 54 yards, 5:27; Tulane 27–13)

Statistics	TUL	TLSA
First downs	24	16
Total yards	482	257
Rushes/yards	53–357	34–111
Passing yards	125	146
Passing: Comp–Att–Int	11–19–1	13–25–0
Time of possession	34:02	25:58

Team	Category	Player	Statistics
Tulane	Passing	Michael Pratt	11/19, 125 yards, 2 TD, INT
Tulane	Rushing	Tyjae Spears	14 carries, 157 yards, TD
Tulane	Receiving	Duece Watts	2 receptions, 42 yards
Tulsa	Passing	Braylon Braxton	13/25, 146 yards, TD
Tulsa	Rushing	Deneric Prince	14 carries, 55 yards
Tulsa	Receiving	JuanCarlos Santana	2 receptions, 41 yards, TD

=== At Memphis ===
Tulsa Golden Hurricane (3-6) vs Memphis Tigers (4-5)

Quarter	1	2	3	4	Total
Golden Hurricanes	3	0	0	7	10
Tigers	10	10	3	3	26

at Simmons Bank Liberty Stadium, Memphis, TN

- Date: November 10th
- Game time: 6:30 p.m. EST
- Game weather: 64 °F (18 °C) • Weather: Clear • Wind: N 1 MPH
- Game attendance: 23,980
- Referee: Luke Richmond
- TV announcers (ESPN): Matt Barrie, Louis Riddick, Harry Lyles Jr.

Statistics	Tulsa	Memphis
First downs	12	17
Plays–yards	60–207	73–341
Rushes–yards	23–31	39–79
Passing yards	176	262
Passing: comp–att–int	17–37–1	20–34–0
Time of possession	23:46	36:14

Team	Category	Player	Statistics
Tulsa	Passing	Braylon Braxton	12/24, 128 yards, 1 TD
Tulsa	Rushing	Deneric Prince	9 carries, 31 yards
Tulsa	Receiving	Keylon Stokes	6 receptions, 68 yards, 1 TD
Memphis	Passing	Seth Henigan	20/34, 262 yards, 1 TD
Memphis	Rushing	Jevyon Ducker	14 carries, 32 yards
Memphis	Receiving	Javon Ivory	7 receptions, 123 yards, 1 TD

Scoring summary

Quarter	Time	Drive			Team	Scoring information	Score	
Quarter	Time	Plays	Yards	TOP	Team	Scoring information	Tulsa	Memphis
							0	0
"TOP" = time of possession. For other American football terms, see Glossary of American football.							0	0

=== South Florida ===
	1	2	3	4	Total
Bulls	10	10	15	7	42
Golden Hurricane	7	24	7	10	48

=== At Houston ===
Uniform Combination
Helmet	Jersey	Pants

Tulsa Golden Hurricane at Houston Cougars

Quarter	1	2	3	4	Total
Golden Hurricane	3	17	7	10	37
Cougars	14	10	3	3	30

at TDECU Stadium • Houston, TX

- Date: Saturday, November 26, 2022
- Game time: 6:35 p.m.
- Game attendance: 21,785
- Referee: Hank Johns
- TV announcers (ESPNU): Beth Mowins, Kirk Morrison, Stormy Buonantony

Game information

First quarter
Second quarter
Third quarter
Fourth quarter

Statistics	TLSA	HOU
First downs	19	24
Plays–yards	75–431	70–506
Rushes–yards	32–115	23–120
Passing yards	316	386
Passing: comp–att–int	25–43–0	26–47–1
Time of possession	29:37	30:23

Team	Category	Player	Statistics
Tulsa	Passing	Braylon Braxton	25/43, 316 yards, 3 TDs
Tulsa	Rushing	Braylon Braxton	11 carries, 51 yards, 1 TD
Tulsa	Receiving	JuanCarlos Santana	6 receptions, 169 yards, 2 TDs
Houston	Passing	Clayton Tune	26/47, 386 yards, 2 TDs, 1 INT
Houston	Rushing	Ta'Zhawn Henry	9 carries, 54 yards
Houston	Receiving	Tank Dell	9 receptions, 161 yards, 1 TD

== Roster ==
2022 Tulsa Golden Hurricane football team roster
Players
Coaches
Offense

Pos.	#	Name	Class
RB	0	Bill Jackson	RFr
QB	1	Braylon Braxton	RFr
WR	2	Keylon Stokes	GS
WR	3	Isaiah Epps	GS
WR	4	Marquis Shoulders	RFr
WR	5	JuanCarlos Santana	GS
RB	6	Jordan Ford	RJr
QB	7	Davis Brin	RSr
RB	8	Deneric Prince	RSr
WR	9	Nick Rempert	RJr
QB	9	Stephen Kittleman	RFr
QB	10	Roman Fuller	RSo
QB	11	Cardell Williams	Fr
WR	12	Keith Wheeler II	Fr
WR	13	Malachai Jones	RSo
WR	15	Carl Chester	So
QB	16	Carson Collins	RJr
WR	18	Kamdyn Benjamin	RJr
WR	19	Devan Williams	Fr
WR	20	Charles Hodge IV	Fr
RB	21	Tahj Gary	RSo
WR	22	Scottie Alexander	RFr
RB	23	Anthony Watkins	RJr
RB	24	Steven Anderson	RSr
WR	26	Eli Potts	Fr
WR	28	Corbin Daniels	Sr
TE	34	Waylon Adams	RFr
RB	35	Cookie Desiderio	Fr
RB	40	Jayce Morgan	Fr
TE	47	Ethan Hall	RJr
RB	48	Kyser Cannon	RFr
OL	50	Gabe Cantu	RSo
OL	51	Tai Marks	RSo
OL	52	Dillon Wade	RSo
OL	54	Walter Young Bear	RFr
OL	56	Will Farniok	RSr
OL	57	Kai-Leon Herbert	GS
OL	60	Trent Robinson	RFr
OL	62	Preston Brown	Fr
OL	65	Ramsey Kifolo	RFr
OL	68	Jake Burrow	Fr
OL	69	Brody Wisecarver	RFr
OL	70	Micah Walters	Fr
OL	71	Tanyon Zachary	Fr
OL	72	Darrell Simpson	RSr
OL	74	Jeremy Jones	RJr
OL	75	Chris Akporoghene	RSo
OL	76	Chester Baah	RJr
OL	77	Bryce Bray	RJr
OL	78	Daniel Ademisoye	Fr
OL	79	Jaden Muskrat	RSo
TE	80	Colby Powers	RFr
TE	82	Connor Vaughn	Fr
WR	86	Jeshari Houston	RFr
TE	88	Bayne Tryon	RSo

Defense

Pos.	#	Name	Class
CB	0	Tyon Davis	GS
S	1	Kendarin Ray	RSr
S	2	Jehlen Cannady	RSo
CB	3	Reggie Ellis	RJr
CB	4	Tyree Carlisle	Jr
CB	5	Kenney Solomon II	RJr
LB	6	Jon-Michael Terry	GS
S	7	Zion Hopes	RFr
LB	8	Brian Johnson	RSr
S	9	Daiquain Jackson	GS
S	10	Sean O'Keefe	RSo
DL	11	Everitt Rogers	Jr
DB	12	Donte Burton	GS
CB	13	NuNu Campbell	Fr
DL	16	Izuchukwu King Ani	RSo
S	18	Brad Hensley	RJr
LB	19	Grant Sawyer	GS
LB	20	Jaden Moore	RFr
S	21	Bryson Powers	GS
S	22	LJ Wallace	RSr
CB	24	DaMarco Williams	RSo
S	25	Jaise Oliver	RJr
LB	26	Zach Neilsen	Fr
CB	27	Kyron Grayson	Fr
LB	28	Eli McWilliams	Fr
S	29	Georderrial Williams	RFr
LB	30	Justin Wright	RSr
CB	32	Canon Peters	RFr
LB	33	Sam Clayton	RJr
CB	34	Kaylon Washington	RSo
S	35	Milton Woodward IV	Jr
S	37	Hunter Rangel	RJr
LB	38	Seth Bullock	RFr
S	39	Dayne Hodge	RFr
LB	40	Mitchell Kulkin	RSr
LB	41	Dorian Hopkins	RJr
DL	42	Vontroy Malone	Fr
DL	44	Joseph Anderson	RSr
LB	46	Bershard Glaspie Jr.	RJr
DL	48	Owen Ostroski	RFr
DL	49	Gabe Lyon	RFr
LB	50	Connor Strudwick	Fr
DL	52	Duvan Boshoff	Fr
LB	53	William Alexander	RFr
LB	54	Trevor Reh	RJr
DL	58	Denver Hanna	Fr
DL	90	Jayden Simon	RSo
DL	92	Darrias Murdock	RJr
DL	93	Bryce Alonso	RSr
DL	94	Anthony Goodlow	RSr
DL	95	Cooper Laake	RJr
DL	96	Vincent Ume-Ezeoke	RJr
DL	97	Brody Reese	RFr
DL	98	Haydon Grant	Jr
DL	99	Tai Newhouse	Fr

Special teams

Pos.	#	Name	Class
K	18	Michael Slaba	Fr
K	27	Connor Bryan	RFr
P	32	Scott Stanford	Fr
LS	35	Connor Cook	Fr
P	37	Lachlan Wilson	RJr
K	43	Tyler Tipton	RSo
LS	46	Caleb Matthews	RFr
K	90	Zack Long	GS
K	95	Alex Haight	RSo

Head coach

- Philip Montgomery (Tarleton State)

Coordinators/assistant coaches

- Calvin Lowry (Penn State)
  Co-passing game coordinator, Receivers & Special Teams Coach
- Luke Olson (Southern Nazarene)
  Defensive coordinator & Nickel Safeties Coach
- Beau Trahan (Texas)
  Co-passing game coordinator & quarterbacks Coach
- Jesse Williams (Sonoma State)
  Defensive run game coordinator & Line Coach
- Jayden Everett (Indiana State)
  Running backs coach
- Steve Farmer (Illinois State)
  Offensive line coach
- Gary McGraw (Oregon)
  Cornerbacks coach
- Kendrick Shaver (Missouri State)
  Safeties coach
- Craig Suits (Tulsa)
  Linebackers coach
- Luke Wells (Oklahoma)
  Tight ends coach
- Nick Franey (Central Methodist)
  Quality Control Analyst
- Grant Lester (Oklahoma)
  Quality Control Analyst
- Cody Scribner (Central Missouri)
  Quality Control Analyst
- Mason Farquhar (Oklahoma)
  Defensive Graduate Assistant

Legend

- (C) Team captain
- (S) Suspended
- (I) Ineligible
- Injured
- Redshirt

Roster
