= Trevis Gipson =

American football player (born 1997)

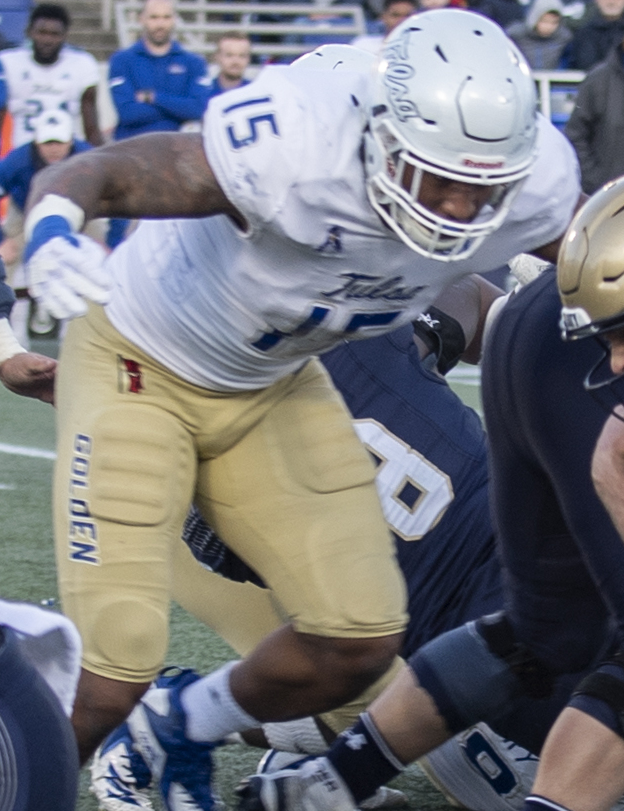
- Gipson with the Tulsa Golden Hurricane in 2018

No. 52 – Carolina Panthers
- Position: Outside linebacker
- Roster status: Active

Personal information
- Born: June 13, 1997 (age 29); Cedar Hill, Texas, U.S.
- Listed height: 6 ft 4 in (1.93 m)
- Listed weight: 264 lb (120 kg)

Career information
- High school: Cedar Hill
- College: Tulsa (2015–2019)
- NFL draft: 2020: 5th round, 155th overall pick

Career history
- Chicago Bears (2020–2022); Tennessee Titans (2023); Jacksonville Jaguars (2024)*; Seattle Seahawks (2024); San Francisco 49ers (2025); Carolina Panthers (2025–present)
- * Offseason or practice squad member only

Awards and highlights
- First-team All-AAC (2019)

Career NFL statistics as of 2025
- Total tackles: 95
- Sacks: 12
- Forced fumbles: 6
- Fumble recoveries: 2
- Pass deflections: 5
- Stats at Pro Football Reference

Trevis Gipson (born June 13, 1997) is an American professional football outside linebacker for the Carolina Panthers of the National Football League (NFL). He played college football for the Tulsa Golden Hurricane, and selected in the fifth round of the 2020 NFL draft by the Chicago Bears.

== College career ==
During high school, Gipson played high school football for Joey McGuire at Cedar Hill High School and was on the 2014 State Championship team. A 2-star recruit, Gipson committed to Tulsa on November 15, 2014, choosing the Golden Hurricane over Tennessee State.

After redshirting for a year and seeing reserve action in his freshman and sophomore seasons, Gipson gained a starting role for his junior season in 2018 and had five forced fumbles, tied for second in the FBS. Pro Football Focus put Gipson in their first-team all-American Athletic Conference for his stopping power and ability to pressure quarterbacks.

Before his senior season, Gipson was invited by Von Miller to Miller's pass rush summit.

After his senior season, Gipson earned first-team all-American Athletic Conference for his play. He participated in the 2020 Senior Bowl and 2020 NFL Combine.

=== College statistics ===
Year	Team	Games		Tackles				Interceptions				Fumbles		
Year	Team	GP	GS	Total	Solo	Ast	Sack	PD	Int	Yds	TD	FF	FR	TD
2015	Tulsa	0	0	Did not play										
2016	Tulsa	13	0	8	5	3	1.0	0	0	0	0	0	0	0
2017	Tulsa	12	1	11	4	7	0.0	1	0	0	0	1	0	0
2018	Tulsa	12	12	46	29	17	4.0	1	0	0	0	5	0	0
2019	Tulsa	12	11	49	25	24	8.0	0	0	0	0	2	0	0
Career		49	24	114	63	51	13.0	2	0	0	0	8	0	0

== Professional career ==
Pre-draft measurables
Height	Weight	Arm length	Hand span	Wingspan	40-yard dash	10-yard split	20-yard split	20-yard shuttle	Three-cone drill	Vertical jump	Broad jump	Bench press
6 ft 3 3/8 in (1.91 m)	261 lb (118 kg)	33 7/8 in (0.86 m)	9 5/8 in (0.24 m)	6 ft 9 1/4 in (2.06 m)	4.73 s	1.63 s	2.69 s	4.33 s	7.57 s	34.0 in (0.86 m)	10 ft 2 in (3.10 m)	25 reps
All values from NFL Combine/Pro Day

=== Chicago Bears ===
Gipson was selected by the Chicago Bears with the 155th pick in the fifth round of the 2020 NFL draft. He signed a four-year rookie contract with the team on July 21.

During the 2021 NFL season, Gipson played in 16 games, recording 39 tackles, seven sacks, and forcing five fumbles.

On September 18, 2022, Gipson recorded two sacks during a 27–10 loss to the Green Bay Packers.

Gipson was waived on August 29, 2023 as part of final roster cuts before the start of the 2023 season.

=== Tennessee Titans ===
On August 31, 2023, Gipson signed with the Tennessee Titans.

=== Jacksonville Jaguars ===
On March 18, 2024, Gipson signed with the Jacksonville Jaguars.

=== Seattle Seahawks ===
On August 26, 2024, Gipson was traded to the Seattle Seahawks in exchange for a late-round draft pick.

=== San Francisco 49ers ===
On August 11, 2025, Gipson signed with the San Francisco 49ers. He was released on August 26 as part of final roster cuts and re-signed to the practice squad the next day. He made his 49ers debut on October 2 in a 26–23 win over the Los Angeles Rams, in which he recovered a fumble. On October 18, Gipson was promoted to the active roster, but waived four days later and re-signed to the practice squad. He was released on October 22.

=== Carolina Panthers ===
On October 28, 2025, Gipson was signed by the Carolina Panthers off of the 49ers' practice squad.

On March 16, 2026, Gipson re-signed with the Panthers on a one-year contract.

== NFL career statistics ==
Legend
**Bold**	Career high

=== Regular season ===
Year	Team	Games		Tackles					Interceptions						Fumbles		
Year	Team	GP	GS	Total	Solo	Ast	Sck	TFL	PD	Int	Yds	Avg	Lng	TD	FF	FR	TD
2020	CHI	7	0	5	1	4	0.0	0	0	0	0	0.0	0	0	0	0	0
2021	CHI	16	9	**39**	**23**	**16**	**7.0**	**7**	2	0	0	0.0	0	0	**5**	**1**	0
2022	CHI	**17**	**10**	31	17	14	3.0	4	**3**	0	0	0.0	0	0	0	0	0
2023	TEN	8	0	6	1	5	1.0	0	0	0	0	0.0	0	0	1	0	0
2024	SEA	5	0	0	0	0	0.0	0	0	0	0	0.0	0	0	0	0	0
2025	SF	4	0	2	1	1	0.0	0	0	0	0	0.0	0	0	0	**1**	0
2025	CAR	9	0	12	5	7	1.0	1	0	0	0	0.0	0	0	0	0	0
Career		66	19	95	48	47	12.0	12	5	0	0	0.0	0	0	6	2	0

=== Postseason ===
Year	Team	Games		Tackles					Interceptions						Fumbles		
Year	Team	GP	GS	Total	Solo	Ast	Sck	TFL	PD	Int	Yds	Avg	Lng	TD	FF	FR	TD
2025	CAR	1	0	2	2	0	1.0	1	0	0	0.0	0	0	0	0	0	0
Career		1	0	2	2	0	1.0	1	0	0	0.0	0	0	0	0	0	0

== Personal life ==
Gipson's older brother, Thomas Gipson, is a professional basketball player.
