= Zach Smith (American football) =

American football player (born 1998)

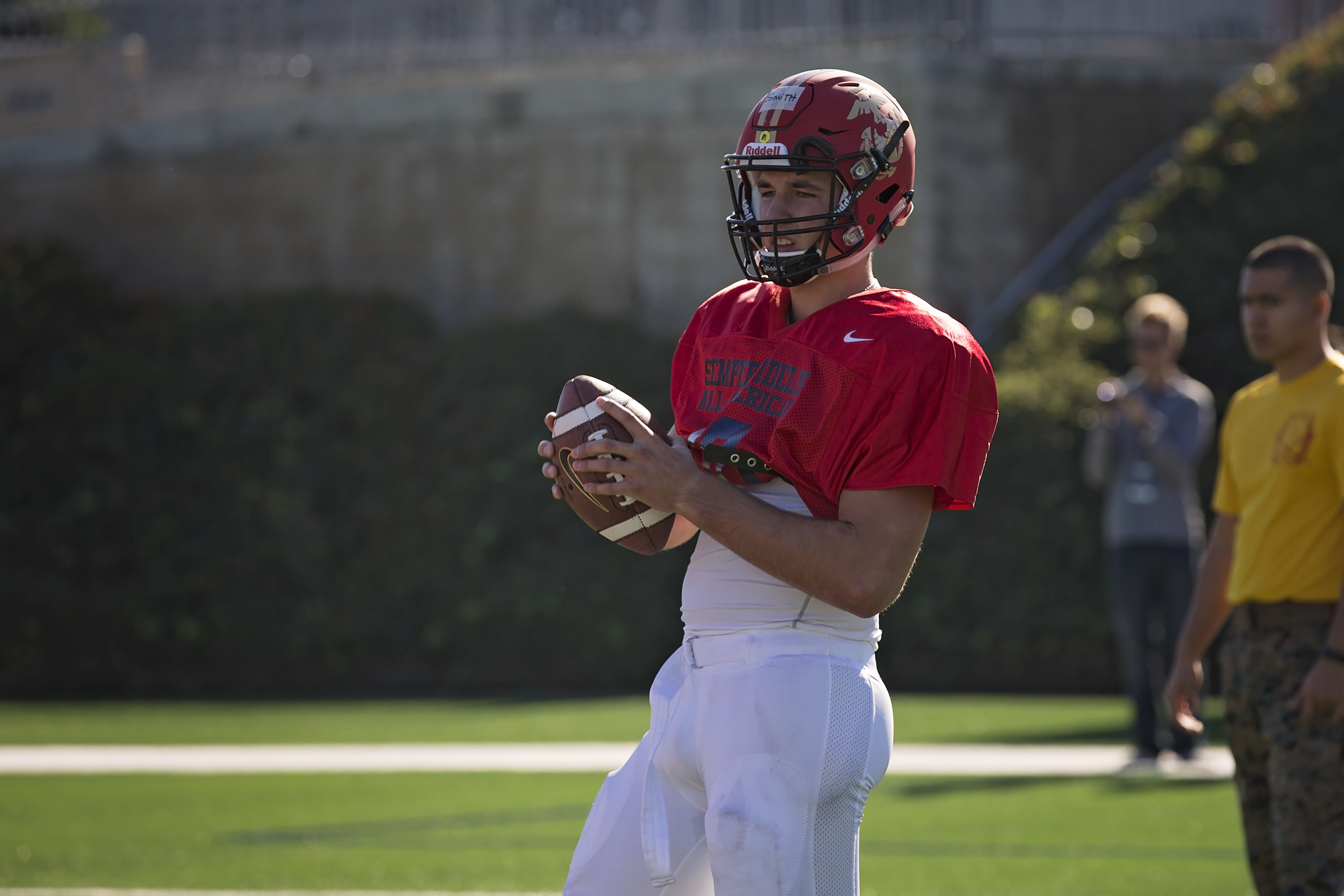
- Smith in 2015

No. 11
- Position: Quarterback

Personal information
- Born: April 15, 1998 (age 28); Grandview, Texas, U.S.
- Listed height: 6 ft 3 in (1.91 m)
- Listed weight: 227 lb (103 kg)

Career information
- High school: Grandview
- College: Baylor (2016–2017); Tulsa (2018–2020)
- NFL draft: 2021: undrafted

Career history
- New Orleans Breakers (2022)

Career USFL statistics
- Passing attempts: 24
- Passing completions: 16
- Completion percentage: 66.6
- TD–INT: 2–2
- Passing yards: 134
- QBR: 73.9
- Stats at Pro Football Reference

Zach Smith (born April 15, 1998) is an American former professional football quarterback. He played college football for the Baylor Bears and the Tulsa Golden Hurricane. He has previously played for the New Orleans Breakers of the United States Football League (USFL).

== Early life ==
Smith grew up in Grandview, Texas, and attended Grandview High School. Smith passed for 10,217 yards and 113 touchdowns over the course of his high school career. Smith committed to play college football for Baylor over offers from Texas, Kansas, and SMU.

== College career ==
=== Baylor ===
Smith began his collegiate career at Baylor University, joining the team as an early enrollee. He played in ten games as a freshman and started the Bears' final four games after Seth Russell suffered a fractured ankle. Smith finished the season with pass completions 116 on 196 attempts for 1,526 yards with 13 touchdowns and seven interceptions.

Going into his sophomore year, Smith competed for the starting quarterback position against incoming freshman Charlie Brewer and graduate transfer Anu Solomon, who was eventually named the starter. He replaced Solomon in the second game of the season and was named the starter following the game. Smith played in nine games with six starts over the course of the season, before losing his starting position to Brewer, completing 105 of 201 pass attempts for 1,471 yards with eight touchdowns and eight interceptions. After the end of the season, he announced his intent to transfer from Baylor.

=== Tulsa ===
Smith ultimately transferred to the University of Tulsa. He sat out the 2018 season per NCAA transfer rules. Smith was named the Golden Hurricane's starting quarterback going into the 2019 season and completed 57.3 percent of his passes for 3,279 yards and 19 touchdowns. In his redshirt senior season, he started all nine games of Tulsa's COVID-19-shortened 2020 season and passed for 1,947 yards and 13 touchdowns.

=== Statistics ===
Year	Team	Games		Passing								Rushing			
Year	Team	GP	Record	Comp	Att	Pct	Yards	Avg	TD	Int	Rate	Att	Yards	Avg	TD
2016	Baylor	10	1–3	116	196	59.2	1,526	7.8	13	7	139.3	25	-26	-1.0	1
2017	Baylor	9	0–6	105	201	52.2	1,471	7.3	8	8	118.9	30	−79	−2.6	0
2018	Tulsa	DNP													
2019	Tulsa	12	4–8	246	429	57.3	3,279	7.6	19	9	132.0	75	−96	−1.3	0
2020	Tulsa	9	6–3	147	263	55.9	1,947	7.4	13	10	126.8	36	−62	−1.7	0
Career		40	11–20	614	1,089	56.4	8,223	7.6	53	34	129.6	166	-263	-1.6	1

== Professional career ==
Smith went unselected in the 2021 NFL draft. He was invited to a tryout with the Buffalo Bills, but was not offered a contract.

Smith was selected in the 12th round of the 2022 USFL draft by the New Orleans Breakers. On February 26, 2023, Smith was released by the Breakers.

=== Statistics ===
USFL statistics
Year	Team	Games		Passing								Rushing			
Year	Team	GP	GS	Cmp	Att	Pct	Yds	Y/A	TD	Int	Rtg	Att	Yds	Avg	TD
2022	NO	6	1	16	24	66.6	134	5.5	2	2	73.9	12	54	4.5	0
