= Keylon Stokes =

American football player (born 1999)

No. 2
- Position: Wide receiver

Personal information
- Born: October 18, 1999 (age 27); Manvel, Texas, U.S.
- Listed height: 5 ft 10 in (1.78 m)
- Listed weight: 202 lb (92 kg)

Career information
- High school: Manvel High School
- College: Tulsa (2017–2022)

Awards and highlights
- First-team All-AAC (2022)
- Stats at Pro Football Reference

Keylon Stokes (born October 18, 1999) is an American former college football wide receiver who played for the Tulsa Golden Hurricane.

== Early life ==
Stokes was born in 1999 and attended Manvel High School in Manvel, Texas. As a senior, he totaled 1,263 receiving yards and 15 touchdowns.

== College career ==
Stokes played six years of college football for Tulsa from 2017 to 2022. He led the team in receiving four times, tallying 575 yards in 2018, 1,040 yards in 2019, 644 yards in 2020, and 1,177 yards through the first eleven games of the 2022 season. He ranks fourth nationally in receiving yards through games played on November 19, 2022. In October 2022, he broke Howard Twilley's Tulsa record of 3,343 receiving yards set from 1963 to 1965.

=== Statistics ===
Year	Team	GP	Receiving			
Year	Team	GP	Rec	Yds	Avg	TD
2017	Tulsa	9	6	143	23.8	0
2018	Tulsa	12	41	575	14.0	2
2019	Tulsa	12	62	1,040	16.8	6
2020	Tulsa	9	46	644	14.0	3
2021	Tulsa	4	11	148	13.5	0
2022	Tulsa	12	76	1,224	16.1	8
Career		58	242	3,774	15.6	19
