= Willie Wright (American football, born 1996) =

American football player (born 1996)

Profile
- Position: Offensive tackle

Personal information
- Born: February 25, 1996 (age 30); Houston, Texas, U.S.
- Listed height: 6 ft 3 in (1.91 m)
- Listed weight: 300 lb (136 kg)

Career information
- High school: Cypress Ridge (Houston, Texas)
- College: Tulsa (2014–2018)
- NFL draft: 2019: undrafted

Career history
- Cleveland Browns (2019)*; Atlanta Falcons (2020); Chicago Bears (2022)*; Tennessee Titans (2022)*; Las Vegas Raiders (2022)*; San Antonio Brahmas (2023)
- * Offseason or practice squad member only
- Stats at Pro Football Reference

Willie Wright (born February 25, 1996) is an American former football offensive tackle. He played college football for the Tulsa Golden Hurricane. Wright has played for the Cleveland Browns, Atlanta Falcons, Chicago Bears, Tennessee Titans, Las Vegas Raiders, and San Antonio Brahmas.

== Personal life and high school ==
Willie Wright was born on February 25, 1996, and is a Houston, Texas native. Wright attended the local Cypress Ridge High School. During his high school career, he earned first-team all-district as a senior offensive tackle in 2013.

== College career ==
After finishing high school, Wright then attended the University of Tulsa. Wright played college football at Tulsa from 2014 to 2018. Wright was a consistent starter at Tulsa, starting 47 out of the 48 games he played in. In 2017, with his help on the offensive line, he helped Tulsa's running game reach the ranking of 14th nationally with 247.2 yards per game.

== Professional career ==
Pre-draft measurables
Height	Weight	Arm length	Hand span	40-yard dash	10-yard split	20-yard split	20-yard shuttle	Three-cone drill	Vertical jump	Broad jump	Bench press
6 ft 2 5/8 in (1.90 m)	296 lb (134 kg)	34 3/8 in (0.87 m)	9 5/8 in (0.24 m)	5.07 s	1.72 s	2.86 s	4.71 s	7.57 s	33.0 in (0.84 m)	9 ft 6 in (2.90 m)	24 reps
All values from Pro Day

=== Cleveland Browns ===
After not being drafted in the 2019 NFL draft, Wright was signed by the Cleveland Browns. He spent the entirety of the 2019 NFL season on their practice squad. After the 2019 season, the Browns opted to not retain Wright for another season.

=== Atlanta Falcons ===
Before the 2020 NFL season, the Falcons signed Wright to the Falcons roster. Despite not making the final roster, Wright did make the practice squad. He was elevated to the active roster on December 12 for the team's week 14 game against the Los Angeles Chargers, and reverted to the practice squad after the game. He signed a reserve/future contract on January 4, 2021. He was waived on August 24, 2021.

=== Chicago Bears ===
On February 11, 2022, the Chicago Bears signed Wright to a reserves/futures deal. He was waived on July 26, 2022.

=== Tennessee Titans ===
On August 3, 2022, Wright signed with the Tennessee Titans. He was waived on August 30.

=== Las Vegas Raiders ===
On December 13, 2022, Wright was signed to the Las Vegas Raiders practice squad. He was released from the practice squad on December 27.

=== San Antonio Brahmas ===
Wright was placed on the reserve list by the San Antonio Brahmas of the XFL on February 20, 2023.
