= Joe Gillespie =

American football coach (born 1971)

Current position
- Title: Head coach
- Team: Midway HS (TX)
- Record: 16–6

Biographical details
- Born: May 3, 1971 (age 54); Stephenville, Texas, U.S.

Coaching career (HC unless noted)
- 1995–2007: Stephenville HS (TX) (assistant)
- 2008–2014: Stephenville HS (TX)
- 2015–2018: Tulsa (LB)
- 2019–2021: Tulsa (DC/LB)
- 2022–2023: TCU (DC/LB)
- 2024–present: Midway HS (TX)

Head coaching record
- Overall: 90–30 (high school)

Joseph Gillespie is an American football coach. He is currently the head coach at Midway High School in Waco, Texas. He has previously served as the defensive coordinator for the University of Tulsa and Texas Christian University.

== Coaching career ==
Gillespie began his coaching career in 1995 as an assistant coach at his hometown Stephenville High School under head coach Art Briles. In 2008, he became the head coach of Stephenville where he led the team to a state championship in 2012.

In 2016 he was hired as the linebackers coach at Tulsa, and was promoted to defensive coordinator in 2019.

In 2022, he was hired by first year head coach Sonny Dykes to be the defensive coordinator of TCU. In his first season at TCU, Gillespie was credited for turning around the Horned Frog's defense and helping lead the team to a 13–2 season. For his success in 2022, Gillespie was named a finalist for the Broyles Award. However, the TCU defense struggled in 2023, missing a bowl, leading to Gillespie's dismissal on December 10, 2023.

In 2024, he was hired to be the new head coach at Midway High School.

== Head coaching record ==
Year	Team	Overall	Conference	Standing	Bowl/playoffs
Stephenville Yellow Jackets () (2008–2014)
2008	Stephenville	10–4	6–1	2nd	
2009	Stephenville	9–3	7–0	1st	
2010	Stephenville	8–6	4–1	2nd	
2011	Stephenville	11–3	4–1	3rd	
2012	Stephenville	15–1	4–0	1st	
2013	Stephenville	12–3	4–0	1st	
2014	Stephenville	9–4	2–2	3rd	
Stephenville:		74–24	31–5		
Midway Panthers () (2024–present)
2024	Midway	7–4	4–2	2nd	
2025	Midway	9–2	5–1	2nd	
Midway:		16–6	9–3		
Total:		90–30			
National championship Conference title Conference division title or championship game berth
