= 2020 Birmingham Bowl =

Postseason college football bowl game

2020 TicketSmarter Birmingham Bowl
- 14th Birmingham Bowl
Boston College Eagles	Cincinnati Bearcats
(6–6)	(10–3)
ACC	The American
6	38
Head coach: Rich Gunnell (interim)	Head coach: Luke Fickell
	AP / Coaches / CFP; 23 / 22 / 21
	1	2	3	4	Total
Boston College	0	0	6	0	6
Cincinnati	7	10	7	14	38
- Date: January 2, 2020
- Season: 2019
- Stadium: Legion Field
- Location: Birmingham, Alabama
- MVP: Desmond Ridder (QB, Cincinnati)
- Favorite: Cincinnati by 7.5
- Referee: Greg Sujack (MAC)
- Attendance: 27,193
- Payout: US$1,374,545

United States TV coverage
- Network: ESPN
- Announcers: Kevin Brown (play-by-play), Andre Ware (analyst) and Dawn Davenport (sideline)

International TV coverage
- Network: ESPN Brasil
- Announcers: Everaldo Marques (play-by-play); Weinny Eirado (analyst)

The 2020 Birmingham Bowl was a college football bowl game played on January 2, 2020, with kickoff at 3:00 p.m. EST (2:00 p.m. local CST) on ESPN. It was the 14th edition of the Birmingham Bowl, and was one of the 2019–20 bowl games concluding the 2019 FBS football season. Sponsored by the TicketSmarter ticket sales company, the game was officially known as the TicketSmarter Birmingham Bowl.

With 7:55 remaining in the first quarter, the game was delayed due to lightning. This was Boston College's second consecutive bowl game that has been impacted by weather, as the 2018 First Responder Bowl (in which Boston College played Boise State) was canceled and ruled a no contest due to inclement weather. The delay lasted a total of 91 minutes before the game resumed at 4:55 p.m. EST.

== Teams ==
The game featured the Boston College Eagles of the Atlantic Coast Conference (ACC) going up against the Cincinnati Bearcats of the American Athletic Conference (The American). This was the eighth overall meeting between the two programs; the Eagles led the all-time series, 4–3.

=== Boston College Eagles ===
Boston College entered the game with a 6–6 record (4–4 in conference). They finished in a three-way tie for third place in the ACC's Atlantic Division. The Eagles lost to both ranked opponents they faced, Clemson and Notre Dame. This was the first Birmingham Bowl appearance for Boston College.

=== Cincinnati Bearcats ===
Cincinnati entered the game with a 10–3 record (7–1 in conference). They finished atop the East Division of The American, then lost the AAC Championship Game to Memphis, 29–24. The Bearcats were 1–3 against ranked opponents, defeating UCF while falling to Ohio State and Memphis twice. This was Cincinnati's second Birmingham Bowl; their 2007 team won the then-PapaJohns.com Bowl over Southern Miss, 31–21.

== Game summary ==
2020 Birmingham Bowl

Quarter	1	2	3	4	Total
Boston College	0	0	6	0	6
No. 21 Cincinnati	7	10	7	14	38

at Legion Field • Birmingham, Alabama

- Date: Thursday, January 2, 2020
- Game time: 3:00 p.m. EST (2:00 p.m. CST)
- Game weather: Rainy • Temperature: 55 °F (13 °C) • Wind: 9 mph
- Game attendance: 27,193
- Referee: Greg Sujack
- TV announcers (ESPN): Kevin Brown (play-by-play), Andre Ware (analyst) and Dawn Davenport (sideline)
- ESPN game summary

Game information

First Quarter

- (2:16) CIN – Desmond Ridder 13 yard rush, Sam Crosa kick (Drive: 10 plays, 79 yards, 3:45; Cincinnati 7–0)

Second Quarter

- (8:20) CIN – Sam Crosa 32 yard field goal (Drive: 16 plays, 63 yards, 6:31; Cincinnati 10–0)
- (7:05) CIN – Desmond Ridder 14 yard rush, Sam Crosa kick (Drive: 1 play, 19 yards, 0:06; Cincinnati 17–0)

Third Quarter

- (9:02) CIN – Desmond Ridder 8 yard pass to Malick Mbodj, Sam Crosa kick (Drive: 12 plays, 75 yards, 5:51; Cincinnati 24–0)
- (4:56) BC – Brandon Sebastian 67 yard blocked field goal return, 2-point pass failed (Cincinnati 24–6)

Fourth Quarter

- (13:06) CIN – Desmond Ridder 13 yard rush, Sam Crosa kick (Drive: 12 plays, 65 yards, 6:50; Cincinnati 31–6)
- (0:39) CIN – Ryan Montgomery 1 yard rush, Sam Crosa kick (Drive: 12 plays, 63 yards, 5:13; Cincinnati 38–6)

=== Statistics ===
Statistics	BC	CIN
First downs	8	33
Plays–yards	47–164	91–459
Rushes–yards	28–77	60–343
Passing yards	87	116
Passing: comp–att–int	8–19–0	17–31–0
Time of possession	18:31	41:29

Team	Category	Player	Statistics
Boston College	Passing	Dennis Grosel	8/17, 87 yards
Boston College	Rushing	David Bailey	8 carries, 28 yards
Boston College	Receiving	Hunter Long	2 receptions, 45 yards
Cincinnati	Passing	Desmond Ridder	14/24, 95 yards, 1 TD
Cincinnati	Rushing	Desmond Ridder	21 carries, 105 yards, 3 TD
Cincinnati	Receiving	Jayshon Jackson	2 receptions, 33 yards
