= 2019 Cincinnati Bearcats football team =

American college football season

2019 Cincinnati Bearcats football

AAC East Division champion Birmingham Bowl champion

AAC Championship Game, L 24–29 vs. Memphis

Birmingham Bowl, W 38–6 vs. Boston College
- Conference: American Athletic Conference
- East Division

Ranking
- Coaches: No. 21
- AP: No. 21
- Record: 11–3 (7–1 The American)
- Head coach: Luke Fickell (3rd season)
- Offensive coordinator: Mike Denbrock (3rd season)
- Offensive scheme: Multiple
- Defensive coordinator: Marcus Freeman (3rd season)
- Base defense: 4–2–5
- Home stadium: Nippert Stadium

2019 American Athletic Conference football standings
	Conf.			Overall
Team	W		L	W		L
East Division
No. 21 Cincinnati xy	7	–	1	11	–	3
No. 24 UCF	6	–	2	10	–	3
Temple	5	–	3	8	–	5
South Florida	2	–	6	4	–	8
East Carolina	1	–	7	4	–	8
UConn	0	–	8	2	–	10
West Division
No. 17 Memphis xy$	7	–	1	12	–	2
No. 20 Navy x	7	–	1	11	–	2
SMU	6	–	2	10	–	3
Tulane	3	–	5	7	–	6
Houston	2	–	6	4	–	8
Tulsa	2	–	6	4	–	8
Championship: Memphis 29, Cincinnati 24
$ – Conference champion; x – Division champion/co-champions; y – Championship game participant; Rankings from AP Poll

The 2019 Cincinnati Bearcats football team represented the University of Cincinnati in the 2019 NCAA Division I FBS football season. The Bearcats played their home games at Nippert Stadium, and competed as members of the East Division in the American Athletic Conference. They were led by third-year head coach Luke Fickell.

== Recruits ==
The Bearcats signed a total of 16 recruits, including three transfers.

College recruiting information (2019)
Name	Hometown	School	Height	Weight	Commit date
Brody Ingle; OLB	South Bend, Indiana	LaSalle High School	6 ft 1 in (1.85 m)	215 lb (98 kg)	Apr 8, 2018
Brody Ingle; OLB	Recruit ratings: Scout: Rivals: 247Sports: ESPN:				
Cameron Jones; QB	Lexington, Kentucky	Frederick Douglass High School	6 ft 8 in (2.03 m)	255 lb (116 kg)	May 8, 2018
Cameron Jones; QB	Recruit ratings: Scout: Rivals: 247Sports: ESPN:				
Eric Phillips; DE	Cincinnati, Ohio	Colerain High School	6 ft 4 in (1.93 m)	230 lb (100 kg)	May 24, 2018
Eric Phillips; DE	Recruit ratings: Scout: Rivals: 247Sports: ESPN:				
Jacob Dingle; S	Louisville, KY	Trinity High School	6 ft 0 in (1.83 m)	185 lb (84 kg)	Jun 9, 2018
Jacob Dingle; S	Recruit ratings: Scout: Rivals: 247Sports: ESPN:				
Sauce Gardner; CB	Detroit, Michigan	Martin Luther King High School	6 ft 2 in (1.88 m)	175 lb (79 kg)	Jun 9, 2018
Sauce Gardner; CB	Recruit ratings: Scout: Rivals: 247Sports: ESPN:				
Justin Harris; CB	Huber Heights, Ohio	Wayne High School	N/A	180 lb (82 kg)	Jun 10, 2018
Justin Harris; CB	Recruit ratings: Scout: Rivals: 247Sports: ESPN:				
Zach Hummel; DE	Hilliard, Ohio	Hilliard Bradley High School	6 ft 3 in (1.91 m)	239 lb (108 kg)	Jun 18, 2018
Zach Hummel; DE	Recruit ratings: Scout: Rivals: 247Sports: ESPN:				
Izaiah Ruffin; DE	Oak Park, Illinois	Oak Park and River Forest High School	6 ft 6 in (1.98 m)	235 lb (107 kg)	Jun 25, 2018
Izaiah Ruffin; DE	Recruit ratings: Scout: Rivals: 247Sports: ESPN:				
Tre Tucker; WR	Cuyahoga, Ohio	Cuyahoga Falls High School	5 ft 11 in (1.80 m)	175 lb (79 kg)	Jun 27, 2018
Tre Tucker; WR	Recruit ratings: Scout: Rivals: 247Sports: ESPN:				
Steven Hawthorne; DE	Chicago, Illinois	De La Salle Institute	6 ft 4 in (1.93 m)	220 lb (100 kg)	Aug 5, 2018
Steven Hawthorne; DE	Recruit ratings: Scout: Rivals: 247Sports: ESPN:				
Dorian Holloway; OLB	Columbus, Ohio	Marion-Franklin High School	6 ft 4 in (1.93 m)	205 lb (93 kg)	Oct 1, 2018
Dorian Holloway; OLB	Recruit ratings: Scout: Rivals: 247Sports: ESPN:				
Michael Lindauer; QB	Evansville, Indiana	Reitz Memorial High School	6 ft 3 in (1.91 m)	205 lb (93 kg)	Dec 10, 2018
Michael Lindauer; QB	Recruit ratings: Scout: 247Sports: ESPN:				
Jaquan Sheppard; ATH	Zephyrhills, Florida	Zephyrhills High School	6 ft 2 in (1.88 m)	190 lb (86 kg)	Dec 19, 2018
Jaquan Sheppard; ATH	Recruit ratings: Scout: Rivals: 247Sports: ESPN:				
Jonathan Allen; OT	Dayton, Ohio	Dunbar High School	6 ft 6 in (1.98 m)	310 lb (140 kg)	Feb 6, 2019
Jonathan Allen; OT	Recruit ratings: Scout: Rivals: 247Sports: ESPN:				
Overall recruit ranking: Scout: 74 Rivals: 77 247Sports: 74
Note: In many cases, Scout, Rivals, 247Sports, On3, and ESPN may conflict in their listings of height and weight.; In these cases, the average was taken. ESPN grades are on a 100-point scale.; Sources: "2019 Cincinnati Football Commitment List". Rivals.; "2019 Players Commitments – Cincinnati". ESPN.; "2019 Team Ranking". Rivals.com.; "2019 Cincinnati Bearcats football team". 247Sports.

=== Incoming transfers ===
Cincinnati added six transfers to the 2019 roster.

Name	Pos.	Height	Weight	Year	Hometown	Prev. School
James Hudson	OT	6' 5"	255	Freshman (Redshirt)	Toledo, OH	Michigan
Darrian Beavers	LB	6' 3"	218	Sophomore	Cincinnati, OH	UConn
Bryan Cook	S	6' 1"	180	Sophomore	Cincinnati, OH	Howard
Kyriq McDonald	DB	5' 11"	197	Sophomore (Redshirt)	Madison County, AL	Alabama
Garyn Prater	WR	6' 5"	200	Sophomore	Cincinnati, OH	Ohio State
L'Christian Smith	WR	6' 6"	205	Sophomore (Redshirt)	Dayton, OH	Ohio State

== Preseason ==
=== Award watch lists ===
Award	Player	Position	Year
Davey O'Brien Award	Desmond Ridder	QB	So.
Doak Walker Award	Michael Warren II	RB	Jr.
Mackey Award	Josiah Deguara	TE	Sr.
Maxwell Award	Michael Warren II	RB	Jr.
Nagurski Award	James Wiggins	S	Jr.
Ray Guy Award	James Smith	P	Jr.
Rimington Award	Jakari Robinson	C	So.
Thorpe Award	James Wiggins	S	Jr.

=== AAC media poll ===
The AAC media poll was released on July 16, 2019, with the Bearcats predicted to finish second in the AAC East Division.

== Schedule ==
The Bearcats' 2019 schedule consisted of six home games and six away games. Cincinnati hosted two of its four non-conference games; against UCLA from the Pac-12 Conference, and Miami (OH) from the Mid-American Conference for their annual Victory Bell game. They travelled to instate rival Ohio State for their first meeting with the Buckeyes since 2014, and to Marshall.

The Bearcats played eight conference games; hosting Temple, Tulsa, UCF, and UConn. They travelled to South Florida, East Carolina, Houston, and Memphis.

Date	Time	Opponent	Rank	Site	TV	Result	Attendance
August 29	7:00 p.m.	UCLA*		Nippert Stadium; Cincinnati, OH	ESPN	W 24–14	38,032
September 7	12:00 p.m.	at No. 5 Ohio State*		Ohio Stadium; Columbus, OH	ABC	L 0–42	104,089
September 14	12:00 p.m.	Miami (OH)*		Nippert Stadium; Cincinnati, OH (Victory Bell)	ESPNU	W 35–13	35,526
September 28	5:00 p.m.	at Marshall*		Joan C. Edwards Stadium; Huntington, WV	CBSSN on Facebook	W 52–14	32,192
October 4	8:00 p.m.	No. 18 UCF		Nippert Stadium; Cincinnati, OH (rivalry)	ESPN	W 27–24	40,121
October 12	3:30 p.m.	at Houston	No. 25	TDECU Stadium; Houston, TX	ESPN2	W 38–23	25,716
October 19	3:30 p.m.	Tulsa	No. 21	Nippert Stadium; Cincinnati, OH	ESPNU	W 24–13	33,209
November 2	7:00 p.m.	at East Carolina	No. 17	Dowdy–Ficklen Stadium; Greenville, NC	CBSSN	W 46–43	32,276
November 9	3:30 p.m.	UConn^{†}	No. 20	Nippert Stadium; Cincinnati, OH	CBSSN	W 48–3	38,919
November 16	7:00 p.m.	at South Florida	No. 17	Raymond James Stadium; Tampa, FL	CBSSN	W 20–17	29,112
November 23	7:00 p.m.	Temple	No. 19	Nippert Stadium; Cincinnati, OH	ESPN2	W 15–13	30,101
November 29	3:30 p.m.	at No. 18 Memphis	No. 19	Liberty Bowl Memorial Stadium; Memphis, TN (Rivalry)	ABC	L 24–34	36,472
December 7	3:30 p.m.	at No. 17 Memphis	No. 20	Liberty Bowl Memorial Stadium; Memphis, TN (American Championship)	ABC	L 24–29	33,008
January 2, 2020	3:00 p.m.	vs. Boston College*	No. 21	Legion Field; Birmingham, AL (Birmingham Bowl)	ESPN	W 38–6	27,193
*Non-conference game; ^{†}Homecoming; Rankings from AP Poll and CFP Rankings after November 5 released prior to game; All times are in Eastern time

== Game summaries ==
=== UCLA ===
UCLA at Cincinnati – Game summary

Quarter	1	2	3	4	Total
Bruins	0	7	7	0	14
Bearcats	7	3	7	7	24

at Nippert Stadium, Cincinnati, OH

- Date: August 29
- Game time: 7:00 p.m. EDT
- Game weather: 80 °F (27 °C); sun, clear
- Game attendance: 38,032
- Referee: Jay Edwards
- TV announcers (ESPN): Adam Amin (play-by-play), Matt Hasselbeck, Pat McAfee (color), and Molly McGrath (sideline)

Game information

First quarter

- CIN – Josiah Deguara 16-yard TD pass from Desmond Ridder, Sam Crosa kick good, 7:09 (CIN 7–0)

Second quarter

- CIN – Crosa 44-yard field goal, 9:13 (CIN 10–0)
- UCLA – Demetric Felton 75-yard TD pass from Dorian Thompson-Robinson, JJ Molson kick good, 8:23 (CIN 10–7)

Third quarter

- CIN – Michael Warren II 12-yard TD run, Crosa kick good, 11:44 (CIN 17–7)
- UCLA – Chase Cota 7-yard TD pass from Thompson-Robinson, Molson kick good, 5:40 (CIN 17–14)

Fourth quarter

- CIN – Warren II 21-yard TD pass from Ridder, Crosa kick good, 14:51 (CIN 24–14)

Top passers

- CIN – Desmond Ridder – 18/26, 242 yards, 2 TD, 2 INT
- UCLA – Dorian Thompson-Robinson – 8/26, 156 yards, 2 TD, 2 INT

Top rushers

- CIN – Michael Warren II – 26 carries, 92 yards, TD
- UCLA – Demetric Felton – 23 carries, 71 yards

Top receivers

- CIN – Alec Pierce – 2 receptions, 59 yards
- UCLA – Demetric Felton – 2 receptions, 91 yards, TD

The Bearcats kicked off the 2019 season before a raucous near capacity crowd at Nippert Stadium and a national TV audience, and like their previous meeting against the visitors from the Pac-12 dominated the game after a slow start. Sophomore QB Desmond Ridder was an efficient 18–26 from 242 yards while Junior RB Michael Warren II had 92 yards on 26 carries as the Bearcats defeated the Bruins 24–14. Both teams showed opening day rust and jitters combining for 19 penalties. The Bruins nearly flipped the game momentum when Ridder threw an interception near the goal line late in the first half, CB Jay Shaw raced 60 yards with the pass before Josiah Deguara heroically shed several blockers to make the tackle. The Bruins were flagged for a pair of unsportsmanlike conduct penalties and did not score off the turnover as the half ended. Warren scored a pair of touchdowns one on a run the other on a pass to keep the Bearcats comfortably in the lead. The win was the 2nd in the series and completed a 2-year sweep of the Bruins in football and basketball. The Bearcats men's basketball team logged wins over the Bruins in Dec 2017 in Los Angeles and in 2018 in the newly renovated Fifth Third Arena.

=== At Ohio State ===
Cincinnati at Ohio State – Game summary

Quarter	1	2	3	4	Total
Bearcats	0	0	0	0	0
No. 5 Buckeyes	7	21	7	7	42

at Ohio Stadium, Columbus, OH

- Date: September 7
- Game time: 12:00 p.m. EDT
- Game weather: Cloudy, 72 °F (22 °C)
- Game attendance: 104,089
- Referee: Daniel Capron
- TV announcers (ABC): Bob Wischusen (play-by-play), Dan Orlovsky (color), and Allison Williams (sideline)

Game information

First quarter

- OSU (8:28) Justin Fields 7 Yd Run (Blake Haubeil Kick) 5 plays, 41 yards, 1:31 OSU 7–0

Second quarter

- OSU (9:40) J.K. Dobbins 4 Yd Run (Blake Haubeil Kick) 6 plays, 87 yards, 1:49 OSU 14–0
- OSU (7:26) J.K. Dobbins 60 Yd Run (Blake Haubeil Kick) 2 plays, 61 yards, 0:40 OSU 21–0
- OSU (1:53) Garrett Wilson 9 Yd pass from Justin Fields (Blake Haubeil Kick) 8 plays, 88 yards, 3:31 OSU 28–0

Third quarter

- OSU (3:32) Justin Fields 4 Yd Run (Blake Haubeil Kick) 9 plays, 54 yards, 3:52 OSU 35–0

Fourth quarter

- OSU (11:30) K. J. Hill 5 Yd pass from Justin Fields (Blake Haubeil Kick) 9 plays, 55 yards, 4:27 OSU 42–0

Top passers

- CIN – Desmond Ridder 13–20, 166 YDS, 1 INT
- OSU – Justin Fields 20–25 224 YDS 2 TD

Top rushers

- CIN – Tavion Thomas 11 Carries 58 YDS
- OSU – J. K. Dobbins 17 CAR, 141 YDS, 2 TD

Top receivers

- CIN – Alec Pierce 4 Rec 93 YDS
- OSU – Binjimen Victor 5 Rec 69 YDS

Team
Statistic	OSU	UC
Total yards	508	273
Passing yards	238	166
Rushing yards	270	107
Penalties	2–25	10–78
Turnovers	0	2
Time of possession	31:21	28:39

Unlike their 2014 meeting, the Bearcats were never in their meeting with the 5th ranked Ohio State. Ohio State QB Justin Fields threw for 2 scores, ran for an additional 2 scores and Ohio State blew out the Bearcats 42–0, their first shutout loss since 2005. The Bearcats had pitched 6 shutouts in the span of being blanked themselves

=== Miami (OH) ===
Miami at Cincinnati – Game summary

Quarter	1	2	3	4	Total
RedHawks	10	0	3	0	13
Bearcats	0	14	21	0	35

at Nippert Stadium, Cincinnati, OH

- Date: September 14
- Game time: 12:00 p.m. EDT
- Game weather: 73 F Partly Cloudy
- Game attendance: 35,526
- Referee: Curt Johnson
- TV announcers (ESPNU): Kevin Brown (play-by-play) and Andre Ware (color)

Game information

First quarter

- Mia – 7:58 Shelton 1 Run (Sloman Kick) Drive 10 plays 67 Yards 3:46 (Mia 7–0)
- Mia – 3:38 Sam Sloman 41 FG 6–33 3:05 (Mia 10–0)

Second quarter

- UC – 13:35 Warren 8 Run (Crosa Kick) 12–77 4:30 (Mia 10–7)
- UC – 0:10 Warren 1 Run (Crosa Kick) 10–44 1:59 (UC 14–10)

Third quarter

- UC – 10:35 Deguara 27 Pass From Ridder (Crosa Kick) 11–78 4:19 (UC 21–10)
- UC – 5:27 Geddis 51 Pass From Ridder (Crosa Kick) 4–63 1:42 (UC 28–10)
- Mia – 4:11 Sloman 36 FG 7–49 1:08 (UC 28–13)
- UC – 3:24 Warren 73 Run (Crosa Kick) 2–75 :47(UC 35–13)

Fourth quarter

No Scoring

Top passers

- MIA – Blake Gabbert 10–18 143 Yds
- CIN – Desmond Ridder 14–30 186 yds 2 TDS

Top rushers

- MIA – Tyre Shelton 11 Carries 39 Yds 1 TD
- CIN – Michael Warren II 12 Carries 113 Yards 3 Tds

Top receivers

- MIA – Dominique Robinson 2 Rec 46 Yds
- CIN – Thomas Geddis 1 Rec 51 Yds TD

The Bearcats shook off a slow start and after spotting Miami 10 1st quarter points, scored 35 points in the 2nd and 3rd quarter to roar back to a 35–13 win. The Bearcats scored on four of five possessions in a span of the 2nd and 3rd quarters to rally then break the game open. Michael Warren rushed for 113 yards and 3 scores including a breathtaking 73-yard run as he made a number of nifty cutbacks and jukes before sprinting untouched the last 40 yards. Desmond Ridder threw for 186 yards and a pair of touchdowns both of which came on beautiful lead throws to his receivers. The win ensured the Victory Bell stays in Cincinnati for the 14th straight year, the longest run in the series which dates back to 1888 and is the oldest collegiate football rivalry west of the Alleghenies.

=== At Marshall ===
Cincinnati at Marshall – Game summary

Quarter	1	2	3	4	Total
Bearcats	14	14	17	7	52
Thundering Herd	0	0	0	14	14

at Joan C. Edwards Stadium, Huntington, WV

- Date: September 28
- Game time: 5:00 p.m. EST
- Game weather: 92 F Clear
- Game attendance: 32,192
- Referee: Henry Johns
- TV announcers (CBSSN on Facebook): Ben Holden (play-by-play), Ross Tucker (color), and Tina Cervasio (sideline)

Game information

First quarter

- UC – Medaris 13 Pass From Ridder (Crosa Kick)
- UC – Pierce 17 Pass From Ridder (Crosa Kick)

Second quarter

- UC – Deguara 13 Pass From Ridder (Crosa Kick)
- UC – Deguara 2 Run (Crosa Kick)

Third quarter

- UC – LaBelle 4 Pass From Ridder (Crosa Kick)
- UC – Crosa 32 FG
- UC – Thomas 1 Run (Crosa Kick)

Fourth quarter

- MRSH – Evans 13 Run (Rohrwasser Kick)
- MRSH – Johnson 40 Run (Rohrwasser Kick)
- UC – Kopaygarodsky 1 Run (Crosa Kick)

Top passers

- CIN – Desmond Ridder 18–22 221 Yds 4 TDs
- MRSH – Isaiah Green 11–29 131 Yds

Top rushers

- CIN – Tavion Thomas 71 Yds 1 TD
- MRSH – Brenden Knox 49 Yds

Top receivers

- CIN – Alec Pierce 108 Yds 1 TD
- MRSH – Brenden Knox 50 Yds

Shaking off their reputation for slow starts the Bearcats scored the game's first 45 points en route to a 52–14 blasting of Marshall in front of a sullen crowd in Huntington, W Va. The Bearcats were rude guests, scoring on each of their first four drives. Desmond Ridder threw for four scores. Marshall was limited to 256 yards of offense, with half of that coming in the fourth.

=== UCF ===
UCF at Cincinnati – Game summary

Quarter	1	2	3	4	Total
No. 18 Knights	3	13	0	8	24
Bearcats	0	10	10	7	27

at Nippert Stadium, Cincinnati, OH

- Date: October 4
- Game time: 8:00 p.m. EDT
- Game weather: 61 F Clear
- Game attendance: 40,121
- Referee: Mike Roche
- TV announcers (ESPN): Chris Cotter (play-by-play), Mark Herzlich, Jim L. Mora (color), and Paul Carcaterra (sideline)

Game information

First quarter

- UCF- Barnas 24 FG

Second quarter

- UC Crosa 38 FG
- UCF Barnas 22 FG
- UC Cloud 5 Pass From Ridder (Crosa Kick)
- UCF Barnas 31 FG
- UCF McCrae 1 Run (Barnas Kick)

Third quarter

- UC Crosa 26 FG
- UC Garnder 16 Int Return (Crosa Kick)

Fourth quarter

- UC Pierce 11 Pass from Ridder (Crosa Kick)
- UCF Tre Nixon 45 Pass From Gabriel (Adrian Killins pass from Gabriel)

Top passers

- UCF – Dillon Gabriel 25–46 297 1 TD, 3 INT
- CIN – Desmond Ridder 17–31 149 2 TDs, 1 INT

Top rushers

- UCF – Greg McCrae 17 Carries 71 Yards 1 TD
- CIN – Michael Warren II 23 Carries 133 Yards

Top receivers

- UCF – Gabe Davis 13 Rec 170 Yds
- CIN – Josiah DeGuara 5 Rec 64 Yds

In front of a frenzied, black-clad crowd of 40,121 (which included a record 7,825 UC students), the Bearcats upset the 18th ranked Knights and avenged a pair of lopsided defeats from the previous two seasons. The Bearcats forced 4 turnovers, limited UCF to 3.0 yards per carry, and held the high-powered Knights offense under 30 points for the first time in 31 games (which was an FBS record). The win also snapped the Knights' 19-game conference win streak. The Bearcats and Knights traded scores in the 1st half and the Knights held a 16–10 lead at halftime. The Bearcats closed the gap to 16–13 on a Sam Crosa field goal. Sauce Gardner picked off a Dillon Gabriel pass and raced 16 yards with the stolen loaf to give the Bearcats a lead they would never relinquish. After extending their lead to 11 with Desmond Ridder's scoring strike to Alec Pierce, the Knights fought back to close the game to 3 with a 45-yard pass from Gabriel to Nixon. The Knights would not get the ball back as the Bearcats would recover the Knights' onside kick attempt and then converted a 4th and inches to ice the game. The Bearcats earned their first home win over a ranked opponent since 2009 (West Virginia) and their first win over a ranked team since 2012 (Virginia Tech), having lost their last 6 attempts. The win moved the Bearcats into 1st place in the AAC East and earned the Bearcats a Top 25 ranking at 25.

=== At Houston ===
Cincinnati at Houston – Game summary

Quarter	1	2	3	4	Total
No. 25 Bearcats	14	7	0	17	38
Cougars	3	7	7	6	23

at TDECU Stadium, Houston, TX

- Date: October 12
- Game time: 2:30 p.m. CDT
- Game weather: 77 F Sunny, Clear
- Game attendance: 25,716
- Referee: C. Lamertina
- TV announcers (ESPN2): Beth Mowins (play-by-play), Anthony Becht (color), and Rocky Boiman (sideline)

Game information

First quarter

- (12:44) CIN TD – Desmond Ridder 13-yard rush, Sam Crosa kick
  Cincinnati 7–0; Drive: 5 plays, 75 yards, 2:16
- (07:24) HOU FG – Dalton Witherspoon 31-yard field goal
  Cincinnati 7–3; Drive: 4 plays, 6 yards, 1:32
- (07:13) CIN TD – Rashad Medaris 75-yard pass from Desmond Ridder, Sam Crosa kick
  Cincinnati 14–3; Drive: 1 play, 75 yards, 0:11

Second quarter

- (11:36) HOU TD – Jeremy Singleton 50-yard pass from Bryson Smith, Dalton Witherspoon kick
  Cincinnati 14–10; Drive: 6 plays, 66 yards, 3:13
- (08:33) CIN TD – Josiah Deguara 15-yard pass from Desmond Ridder, Sam Crosa kick
  Cincinnati 21–10; Drive: 3 plays, 35 yards, 1:28

Third quarter

- (12:40) HOU TD – Marquez Stevenson 69-yard pass from Clayton Tune, Dalton Witherspoon kick
  Cincinnati 21–17; Drive: 4 plays, 85 yards, 2:20

Fourth quarter

- (13:41) CIN TD – Michael Warren II 11-yard pass from Desmond Ridder, Sam Crosa kick
  Cincinnati 28–17; Drive: 7 plays, 34 yards, 3:43
- (09:09) HOU TD – Christian Trahan 6-yard pass from Clayton Tune, two-point pass conversion attempt failed
  Cincinnati 28–23; Drive: 9 plays, 72 yards, 4:32
- (04:27) CIN FG – Sam Crosa 32-yard field goal
  Cincinnati 31–23; Drive: 10 plays, 48 yards, 4:42
- (03:28) CIN TD – Perry Young 2-yard interception return, Sam Crosa kick
  Cincinnati 38–23; Drive: 3 plays, 2 yards, 0:59

Top passers

- CIN – Desmond Ridder 14–24 263 Yds 3TDs 1 Int
- HOU – Clayton Tune 9–27 184 Yds 2 TDs, 3 INTs

Top rushers

- CIN – Michael Warren II 17 Car 68 Yds
- HOU – Kyle Porter 16 Car 107 Yds

Top receivers

- CIN – Rashad Medaris 3 Rec 121 Yds, 1 TD
- HOU – Marquez Stevenson 3 Rec 120 Yds 1 TD

On the road now as a ranked team (#25), the Bearcats traveled to Houston to face the Cougars. Taking advantage of five turnovers that led to 21 points, The Bearcats led all the way to a 38–23 win and improved to 2–0 in conference play. Big plays were the watchword of the day played under a sunny sky in Houston. Desmond Ridder scrambled 13 yards for the opening score, then found Rashad Medaris streaking downfield for a 75-yard score. After the Cougars cut the Bearcat lead to four with a long touchdown pass of their own, Ridder found Josiah Deguara with a short pass that the senior tight end took into the end zone to give the Bearcats a 21–10 halftime lead. The Cougars again cut the lead to 4 with a 3rd quarter scoring strike, a 69-yard pass from the second of four different quarterbacks the Cougars employed on the day. Michael Warren II took a screen pass from Ridder and pinballed his way to the end zone on an 11-yard TD to open the 4th quarter scoring and give the Bearcats a 28–17 lead. The Cougars answered with their own score but failed on the two-point conversion to close back to 5. After a Sam Crosa field goal increased the Bearcat lead to 8, the Cougars got the ball back needing a touchdown and two-point conversion to tie the score. The Cougars started their drive inside their own 20 and Clayton Tune's 3rd down pass was batted by Malik Vann with Perry Young corralling the ricochet and waltzing into the end zone from 2 yards out for the clinching touchdown. A final Cougar drive was also snuffed out with an end zone interception by Coby Bryant.

=== Tulsa ===
Tulsa at Cincinnati – Game summary

Quarter	1	2	3	4	Total
Golden Hurricanes	0	7	3	3	13
No. 21 Bearcats	10	0	7	7	24

at Nippert Stadium, Cincinnati, OH

- Date: October 19
- Game time: 3:30p.m. EDT
- Game weather: 68 F Partly Cloudy
- Game attendance: 33,209
- Referee: A. Calabrese
- TV announcers (ESPNU): Kevin Brown (play-by-play), Andre Ware (color), and Taylor Davis (sideline)

Game information

First quarter

- UC – Smith 50 FG
- UC – Doaks 4 Run (Crosa Kick)

Second quarter

- TUL – Wilkerson 3 Run (Rainey Kick)

Third quarter

- UC – Doaks 28 pass from Ridder (Crosa Kick)
- TUL – Rainey 24 FG

Fourth quarter

- TUL – Rainey 21 FG
- UC – Doaks 27 Run (Crosa Kick)

Top passers

- TULSA – Zach Smith 21–43 243 yds 2 INT
- CIN – Desmond Ridder 12–22 172 yds 1 TD

Top rushers

- TULSA – Shamari Brooks 16 Carries 68 Yards
- CIN – Gerrid Doaks 17 carries 91 Yards 2 TDs

Top receivers

- TULSA – Keylon Stokes 8 Rec 99 Yards
- CIN – Alec Pierce 2 Rec 63 Yards

Returning home with #21 ranking, the Bearcats hosted the Golden Hurricane. Gerrid Doaks scored three times as he filled in for Michael Warren II who was hampered by nagging injuries and held to 35 yards rushing. Despite being outgained 377–317 in total yardage, the Bearcats led all the way in a 24–13 win. Doaks, who had not seen the end zone since 2017, scored his first touchdown in the 1st quarter on a 4-yard run after the Bearcats opened the scoring with a 50-yard field goal. Trailing 10–0 in the 2nd quarter, the Golden Hurricane got on the board after a bizarre series of events: the Bearcats had forced the Golden Hurricane to punt and partially blocked it, but the ball ricocheted off a Bearcat player 10 yards downfield which Tulsa recovered and went on to score 5 plays later. The Bearcats led 10–7 at the half. The Bearcats increased their lead back to 10 on Doaks' second score of the day, a short pass from Desmond Ridder in which Doaks broke several tackles on his way to diving for the pylon. The Golden Hurricane got as close as 4 on a pair of field goals, the latter early in the 4th quarter. After forcing a turnover deep in their own territory, the Bearcats drove 80 yards but turned the ball over on downs at the Tulsa 10. With a chance to take the lead, Darrick Forrest intercepted Zach Smith and returned the ball to the Tulsa 27. The interception was the 5th forced by the Bearcats defense on the afternoon. Doaks then delivered the back breaker with a nearly untouched 27 yard sprint to the end zone for his third touchdown of the day to put the Bearcats back up by 11. Doaks finished with 91 yards on 17 carries and 2 TDs. The win was the Bearcats' 11th consecutive win at Nippert, with only a 17-game home win streak by the 2008–2012 teams being longer. The win also made the Bearcats bowl eligible for the 2nd straight year.

=== At East Carolina ===
Cincinnati at East Carolina – Game summary

Quarter	1	2	3	4	Total
No. 17 Bearcats	21	0	7	18	46
Pirates	14	17	9	3	43

at Dowdy–Ficklen Stadium, Greenville, NC

- Date: November 2
- Game time: 7:08 p.m. EDT
- Game weather: Clear, 54 °F (12 °C)
- Game attendance: 32,273
- Referee: Edwin Lee
- TV announcers (CBSSN): Rich Waltz (play-by-play), Aaron Murray (color), and Amanda Balionis (sideline)

Game information

First quarter

- (9:20) CIN – Michael Warren II 1-yard run, Sam Crosa kick (Drive: 5 plays, 50 yards, 2:07; Cincinnati 7–0)
- (9:09) ECU – C. J. Johnson 75-yard pass from Holton Ahlers, Jake Verity kick (Drive: 1 play, 75 yards, 0:11; Tied 7–7)
- (8:19) CIN – Gerrid Doaks 2-yard run, Sam Crosa kick (Drive: 3 plays, 75 yards, 0:50; Cincinnati 14–7)
- (3:22) ECU – Holton Ahlers 6-yard run, Jake Verity kick (Drive: 14 plays, 75 yards, 4:57; Tied 14–14)
- (0:19) CIN – Michael Warren II 1-yard run, Sam Crosa kick (Drive: 8 plays, 75 yards, 3:03; Cincinnati 21–14)

Second quarter

- (5:57) ECU – Zech Byrd 3-yard pass from Holton Ahlers, Jake Verity kick (Drive: 6 plays, 75 yards, 2:42; Tied 21–21)
- (3:10) ECU – Jsi Hatfield 3-yard pass from Holton Ahlers, Jake Verity kick (Drive: 7 plays, 71 yards, 1:56; East Carolina 28–21)
- (0:01) ECU – Jake Verity 27-yard field goal (Drive: 4 plays, 38 yards, 0:22; East Carolina 31–21)

Third quarter

- (10:45) CIN – Michael Warren II 3-yard run, Sam Crosa kick (Drive: 9 plays, 75 yards, 4:15; East Carolina 31–28)
- (4:20) ECU – Jake Verity 20-yard field goal (Drive: 15 plays, 80 yards, 6:25; East Carolina 34–28)
- (0:14) ECU – Tyler Snead 9-yard pass from Holton Ahlers, Holton Ahlers pass failed (Drive: 7 plays, 81 yards, 2:32; East Carolina 40–28)

Fourth quarter

- (8:37) CIN – Josiah Deguara 3-yard pass from Desmond Ridder, Sam Crosa kick (Drive: 13 plays, 75 yards, 6:37; East Carolina 40–35)
- (4:38) CIN – Sauce Gardner 62-yard interception, Josiah Deguara pass (Cincinnati 43–40)
- (1:10) ECU – Jake Verity 27-yard field goal (Drive: 9 plays, 65 yards, 3:28; Tied 43–43)
- (0:00) CIN – Sam Crosa 32-yard field goal (Drive: 7 plays, 50 yards, 1:10; Cincinnati 46–43)

Top passers

- CIN – Desmond Ridder 12–24 161 yds 1 TD 2 INT
- ECU – Holton Ahlers 32–52 535 yds 4 TD 1 INT

Top rushers

- CIN – Desmond Ridder 12 carries 146 yds
- ECU – Trace Christian 9 carries 44 yds

Top receivers

- CIN – Josiah Deguara 2 rec 76 yds
- ECU – C.J. Johnson 12 rec 283 yds

After a bye week, the #17 ranked Bearcats headed on the road to face East Carolina, a team that they beat 56–6 in their previous meeting to end the 2018 regular season. Entering the game as heavy favorites, the Bearcats found themselves in a serious fight to remain unbeaten in conference play. The Bearcats opening the scoring with a short TD run by Michael Warren II, only to have the Pirates answer with a 75-yard touchdown pass from Holton Ahlers to CJ Johnson. The Bearcats answered that score with a long pass from Desmond Ridder to Josiah Deguara that covered 73 yards and Gerrid Doaks scoring from 2 yards out. The back and forth scoring continued with the Bearcats and Pirates trading scores and UC leading 21–14 after one quarter. ECU then scored 17 unanswered points to take a 31–21 lead into the half. The Bearcats responded with a solid drive to open the 2nd half, with Warren scoring his third TD of the game. The Pirates added another touchdown late in the 3rd to build their biggest lead at 40–28. The Bearcats battled back, cutting the lead to 5 with a touchdown pass from Ridder to Deguara. The biggest play of the game came from the much-maligned defense—with the Pirates pushing into Bearcats territory for a potential backbreaking score, Sauce Gardner intercepted a short out route pass and raced 62 yards with the stolen loaf for a momentum turning touchdown. The pick-6 gave the Bearcats a 43–40 lead after a Ridder to Deguara 2-point conversion. The Pirates did not go quietly, grinding a 9-play 65-yard drive ending in a Jake Verity 27-yard field goal. With good field position due to a poor kickoff by Verity, UC's Ridder raced 30 yards on the first play, and a trio of short passes to Malick Mbodj got the Bearcats to the ECU 16-yard line. Sam Crosa nailed a 32-yard field goal with no time left to win the game. The Bearcats got the win despite being outgained (638–462), giving up 35 first downs, and having a nearly 10 min deficit in time of possession. The win kept the Bearcats unbeaten in conference play.

=== UConn ===
Connecticut at Cincinnati – Game summary

Quarter	1	2	3	4	Total
Huskies	0	0	0	3	3
No. 17 Bearcats	14	24	3	7	48

at Nippert Stadium, Cincinnati, OH

- Date: November 9
- Game time: 3:32 p.m. EST
- Game weather: Sunny • Temperature: 45 °F (7 °C) • Wind: NNW 1 mile per hour (1.6 km/h)
- Game attendance: 38,919
- Referee: Adam Savoie
- TV announcers (CBSSN): Rich Waltz (play-by-play) and Aaron Murray (color)

Game information

First quarter

- UC – 11:31 Deguara 18 Pass from Ridder (Crosa Kick) 4 Plays 62 Yards 1:32 UC 7–0
- UC – 5:55 Warren 6 Run (Crosa Kick) 7 plays, 65 yards, 2:44 UC 14–0

Second quarter

- UC – 14:49 Smith 45 FG 13 plays, 44 yards, 4:45 UC 17–0
- UC – 5:59 Warren 1 Run (Crosa Kick) 7 plays, 71 yards, 2:48 UC 24–0
- UC – 2:35 Doaks 1 Run (Crosa Kick) 5 plays, 70 yards, 1:29 UC 31–0
- UC – 0:06 Deguara 15 pass from Ridder (Crosa Kick)5 plays, 55 yards, 0:36 UC 38–0

Third quarter

- UC – 10:53 Crosa 32 Yd FG 11 plays, 56 yards, 4:02 UC 41–0

Fourth quarter

- UC – 14:53 Montgomery 2 Run (Crosa Kick) 11 plays, 93 yards, 5:07 UC 48–0
- Conn – 5:37 Harris 32 FG 16 plays, 52 yards, 9:08 UC 48–3

Top passers

- UCONN – Michael Beaudry 6-9/ Zergiotis 4–14 35 Yds each
- CIN – Ridder 13/23 136 Yds 2 TDs

Top rushers

- UCONN – Kevin Mensah 24 Car 115 Yds
- CIN – Doaks 13 Car 123 Yds

Top receivers

- UCONN – Brown 3 Rec 29 Yds
- CIN – DeGuara 5 Rec 48 Yds 2 TDs

The #17 Bearcats (#20 CFP rankings) hosted Connecticut on a chilly, but sunny, homecoming Saturday. The Bearcats dominated the game from the start, driving the length of the field after holding the Huskies to a three-and-out on their initial drive. Desmond Ridder found Josiah Deguara in the middle of the end zone for the score. Michael Warren II scored on a 6-yard run on the Bearcats' second drive to build a 14–0 lead. The Bearcats scored 24 points in the second quarter with a field goal from Cole Smith, a short TD run by Gerrid Doaks, and a second score from Warren. Ridder added a second touchdown pass to Deguara on a slick fade pattern to make it 38–0 at the half. After playing one series in the 3rd quarter, the starters were done for the day. The rout gave Bearcats head coach Luke Fickell a chance to use a majority of reserve players in the 2nd half, providing valuable game experience. Ryan Montgomery crashed into the end zone early in the 4th to make it 48–0. UConn spoiled the shutout bid with a late field goal but the 48–3 win gave the Bearcats a 13–3 edge in the all-time series and kept them perfect at 10–0 all-time at home against UConn. Desmond Ridder passed for 136 yards and a pair of touchdowns. Gerrid Doaks rushed for 123 yard and a score. The Bearcats dominated statistically gaining over 500 yards for the second straight week and 307 yards rushing. The defense allowed 218 yards total offense and 70 yards passing, a stark contrast to the 535 given up in the week previous. The 7th win matched the longest winning streak since 2014 and kept the Bearcats unbeaten in conference play. The Bearcats also extended their home win streak to 12 dating back to November 2017. Combined with the loss by UCF to Tulsa earlier in the day, the win clinched no worse than a tie for the American Eastern Division.

=== At South Florida ===
Cincinnati at South Florida – Game summary

Quarter	1	2	3	4	Total
No. 17 Bearcats	0	0	10	10	20
Bulls	7	3	7	0	17

at Raymond James Stadium, Tampa, FL

- Date: November 16
- Game time: 7:00 P.M EST
- Game weather: 71F Muggy
- Game attendance: 29,112
- Referee: Anthony Calabre
- TV announcers (CBSSN): Rich Waltz (play-by-play), Corey Chavous (color), and Jenny Dell (sideline)

Game information

First quarter

- USF – Trevon Sands 4 Run (Spencer Shrader kick)

Second quarter

- USF – Spencer Shrader 28 FG

Third quarter

- UC- Gerrid Doaks 1 Run (Sam Crosa Kick)
- USF – Mitchell Wilcox 4 pass from Jordan McCloud (Spencer Shrader kick)
- UC – Sam Crosa 41 FG

Fourth quarter

- UC Michael Warren II 2 Run (Sam Crosa Kick)
- UC Sam Crosa 37 FG

Top passers

- CIN – Ridder 9–18 78 Yds
- USF – Jordan McCloud 18–28 267 Yds 1 TD

Top rushers

- CIN – Warren II 26 Car 134 Yds 1 TD
- USF – Jordan Cronkrite 20 Car 78 yds

Top receivers

- CIN – Warren II 2 Rec 30 Yds
- USF – Randall St. Felix 2 Rec 70 Yds

The 17th ranked Bearcats headed on the road to face South Florida in Tampa. Twice rallying back from 10 point deficits, the Bearcats again were walk-off winners with a tense 20–17 win. The Bearcats offense started sluggish and let the Bulls dominate the first half. The Bulls got on the board with a 4-yard run from Trevon Sands in the first quarter and extended their lead to 10 with a Spencer Shrader field goal. In the second half, the Bearcats got on the board with a short TD run from Gerrid Doaks. The Bulls extended their lead back to 10 with a short TD pass from Bulls QB Jordan McCloud to Mitchell Wilcox. The Bearcats cut the deficit back to 7 with a 41-yard field goal from Sam Crosa. In the 4th quarter, the Bearcats tied the game with a 4-yard touchdown run from Michael Warren II. After a series of possessions with no scoring, the Bulls went on a 13-play, 82-yard drive and Shrader lined up for a 33-yard field but his attempt was no good, bouncing off the upright. Given a reprieve, the Bearcats raced back down the field and Crosa nailed a 37-yard field goal as the clock expired, giving the Bearcats their first lead of the game. The win kept the Bearcats unbeaten in conference and extended their winning streak to 8 games.

=== Temple ===
Temple at Cincinnati – Game summary

Quarter	1	2	3	4	Total
Owls	0	0	0	13	13
No. 19 Bearcats	0	6	7	2	15

at Nippert Stadium, Cincinnati, OH

- Date: November 23
- Game time: 7:00 P.M EST
- Game weather: Rain/Snow, 34 °F (1 °C)
- Game attendance: 30,101
- Referee: Charles Lamertina
- TV announcers (ESPN2): Anish Shroff (play-by-play), John Congemi (color), and Kris Budden (sideline)

Game information

First quarter

None

Second quarter

- UC – Sam Crosa 36 FG
- UC – Sam Crosa 37 FG

Third quarter

- UC – Michael Warren II 13 Run (Sam Crosa Kick)

Fourth quarter

- TEM – Re'Mahn Davis 7 Run (Kick blocked)
- UC – Coby Bryant 98 yard blocked PAT return
- TEM – Kenny Yeboah 13 Pass from Anthony Russo (Will Mobley Kick)

Top passers

- TEMP – Anthony Russo 24–23 258 Yds 1 TD
- CIN – Ridder 9–25 62 Yds

Top rushers

- TEMP – Re'Mahn Davis 71 Yds 1 TD
- CIN – Warren II 104 1 TD

Top receivers

- TEMP – Jadan Blue 13 Rec 120 Yds
- CIN – Maderis 2 Rec 19 Yds

The 17th ranked (19th in CFP poll) Bearcats took the field against Temple in the regular season home finale for Senior Night. On a raw, rainy night, the Bearcats battled the Owls in an attempt to clinch their first AAC divisional title. After a scoreless first quarter, the Bearcats took the lead on a short field goal by Sam Crosa. The Bearcats squandered a chance to go up 10 after Temple punter Adam Barry knelt to field a low punt snap and was ruled down at the Temple 6-yard line. The Bearcats failed to move the ball (actually losing 14 yards) and settled for a second Crosa field goal to double their lead going into the half. Taking the 2nd half kickoff, the Bearcats put together their best drive of the game. Taking advantage of the kickoff going out of bounds, the Bearcats drove 65 yards in 9 plays, highlighted by an 18-yard run by Michael Warren II and a 14-yard scamper by Gerrid Doaks. Warren finished the drive with a 13-yard TD run. Temple got onto the board with a 10-play 73-yard drive with Re'Mahn Davis scoring on 7-yard run. The Bearcats, however, blocked the extra point attempt, and Coby Bryant scooped up the ball and raced 98 yards for 2 points making the score 15–6. This would be the score that would prove critical later in the game. The Bearcats punted on the subsequent drive and The Owls again put together a lengthy drive and again scored a touchdown with Temple QB Anthony Russo connecting with TE Kenny Yeboah on a 16-yard scoring strike to cut the lead to 15–13. Trying to ride out the clock, the Bearcats went on a 10-play 42-yard drive highlighted by a 17-yard run by Warren. The drive stalled and Crosa missed a 40-yard field goal. Taking over with one time-out and needing at 45 yards to get into field goal range, the Owls tried a last desperate drive, but 4 plays later Darrick Forrest picked off a deep pass attempt by Russo to seal the game. The Bearcats won their 3rd game when being outgained in yardage (310–210). The Bearcats broke a 4-game losing streak to Temple, completed their 2nd consecutive perfect home schedule and extended their home winning streak to 13.

=== At Memphis ===
Cincinnati at Memphis – Game summary

Quarter	1	2	3	4	Total
No. 19 Bearcats	3	14	0	7	24
No. 18 Tigers	17	3	0	14	34

at Liberty Bowl Memorial Stadium, Memphis, TN

- Date: November 29
- Game time: 3:30 EST (2:30 CST)
- Game weather: Cloudy, 55 °F (13 °C)
- Game attendance: 36,472
- Referee: Mike Roche
- TV announcers (ESPNU/ABC): Jason Benetti (play-by-play), Rod Gilmore (color), and Quint Kessenich (sideline)

Game information

First quarter

- MEM 14:48 Chris Claybrooks 94 kickoff return (Riley Patterson Kick)
- CIN 10:25 Sam Crosa 30 FG (11 Plays 63 Yards 4:23)
- MEM 7:24 Kendarian Jones 9 Pass from Brady White (Riley Patterson Kick) 7, 77 3:01
- MEM 2:41 Riley Patterson 34 FG (8 plays, 57 yards 2:24)

Second quarter

- CIN 12:36 Leonard Taylor 4 Pass from Ben Bryant (Sam Crosa Kick) 12, 85 5:05
- CIN 2:54 Michael Warren II 3 run (Sam Crosa Kick) 14, 80, 6:31
- MEM 1:21 Riley Patterson 28 FG (7 plays 65 yards, 1:43)

Third quarter

No Scoring

Fourth quarter

- MEM 13:22 Damonte Coxie 46 pass from Brady White (Riley Patterson Kick) 9, 83, 3:40
- CIN 10:27 Ben Bryant 12 run (Sam Crosa Kick) 8, 75 2:55
- MEM 3:16 Antonio Gibson 29 run (Riley Patterson Kick) 6, 62, 3:08

Top passers

- CIN – Ben Bryant 20–32 229 1 TD, 2 INTs
- MEM – Brady White 15–26 233 2 TDs 1 INT

Top rushers

- CIN – Michael Warren II 21 Carries 122 Yards 1 TD
- MEM – Kenneth Gainwell 15 Carries 87 Yards

Top receivers

- CIN – Alec Pierce 4 Receptions 77 Yards
- MEM – Damonte Coxie 6 Receptions 145 Yards 1 TD

The 17th ranked (19th in CFP) Bearcats took the field the day after Thanksgiving to battle the 18th ranked Tigers in Memphis. The game was nationally televised on ABC and got off to an inauspicious start for the Bearcats as the kickoff was run back 94 yards by Chris Claybrooks for a Memphis touchdown. The Bearcats would be without the services of Desmond Ridder whose chronic shoulder troubles continued to haunt him. Redshirt freshman Ben Bryant would get the start in Ridder's place and the Bearcat offense struggled to move consistently in the 1st quarter. After getting an opening drive field goal, the Bearcat defense allowed a long Memphis drive which ended in another touchdown, with Kederian Jones on the receiving end of a Brady White pass. Trailing 17–3, the Bearcats drove the length of the field at the start of the 2nd quarter and Bryant found TE Leonard Taylor for a 4-yard touchdown pass. Michael Warren II scored from 4 yards out with 2:54 to play in the half and the Bearcats had erased the deficit. Memphis responded with a short field goal to lead 20–17 at the half. After a scoreless 3rd quarter, the Tigers were on the move and had the ball just inside Bearcat territory when they ran a reverse flea-flicker for a 46-yard touchdown pass from White to Demonte Coxie that boosted the Tiger lead back to 10. The Bearcats cut the deficit back to 3 on a 12-yard touchdown scramble by Bryant, but the Tigers ground out another long drive aided by a costly unsportsmanlike conduct penalty on Myjai Sanders on what should have been a 3rd down stop. The Tigers Antonio Gibson raced in from 29 yards out three plays later, re-extending the Tigers lead to 10. The Bearcats last gasp was snuffed out with an interception, ending the Bearcats' 9-game winning streak. The win clinched the AAC West for the Tigers and gave them home field advantage for the AAC Championship game. Michael Warren rushed for 122 yards and a touchdown, putting him over 1000 yards rushing for the 2nd consecutive season.

=== At Memphis (AAC Championship game) ===
Cincinnati at Memphis AAC Championship – Game summary

Quarter	1	2	3	4	Total
No. 20 Bearcats	7	7	7	3	24
No. 17 Tigers	10	0	10	9	29

at Liberty Bowl Memorial Stadium, Memphis, TN

- Date: December 7
- Game time: 3:30PM (2:30P CST)
- Game weather: 45 °F (7 °C), Clear
- Game attendance: 33,009
- Referee: Charles Lamertina
- TV announcers (ABC): Dave Pasch (play-by-play), Greg McElroy (color), and Tom Luginbill (sideline)

Game information

First Quarter

- (12:27) CIN – Michael Warren 6 yard rush, Sam Crosa kick (Drive: 6 plays, 30 yards, 2:33; Cincinnati 7–0)
- (8:21) MEM – Riley Patterson 29 yard field goal (Drive: 12 plays, 64 yards, 3:59; Cincinnati 7–3)
- (2:36) MEM – Antonio Gibson 65 yard rush, Riley Patterson kick (Drive: 7 plays, 97 yards, 2:29; Memphis 10–7)

Second Quarter

- (2:37) CIN – Desmond Ridder 15 yard rush, Sam Crosa kick (Drive: 7 plays, 80 yards, 2:09; Cincinnati 14–10)

Third Quarter

- (11:59) MEM – Brady White 1 yard rush, Riley Patterson kick (Drive: 7 plays, 75 yards, 2:56; Memphis 17–14)
- (7:21) CIN – Michael Warren 3 yard rush, Sam Crosa kick (Drive: 9 plays, 75 yards, 4:38; Cincinnati 21–17)

(3:54) MEM – Riley Patterson 52 yard field goal (Drive: 10 plays, 41 yards, 3:27; Cincinnati 21–20)

Fourth Quarter

- (14:47) MEM – Riley Patterson 50 yard field goal (Drive: 11 plays, 31 yards, 3:54; Memphis 23–21)
- (4:23) CIN – Sam Crosa 33 yard field goal (Drive: 13 plays, 54 yards, 6:27; Cincinnati 24–23)
- (1:14) MEM – Brady White 6 yard pass to Antonio Gibson, 2-point pass failed (Drive: 10 plays, 75 yards, 3:09; Memphis 29–24)

Top passers

- CIN – Desmond Ridder 16–36 233 Yds 1 INTs
- MEM – Brady White 18–40 253 Yds 1 TDs 1 INT

Top rushers

- CIN – Desmond Ridder 11 Carries 113 Yards 1 TD
- MEM – Antonio Gibson 11 Carries 130 Yards 1 TD

Top receivers

- CIN – Alec Pierce 5 Receptions 87 Yards
- MEM – Damonte Coxie 9 Receptions 165 Yards

The 20th ranked Bearcats were making their first appearance in the AAC title game, seeking their first American title since 2014 when they shared the crown with Memphis & Central Florida (The American Championship game was first played in 2015). The Tigers won the toss and deferred to the 2nd half, but attempted an onside kick on the opening kickoff. The Bearcats alertly called for a fair catch on the kick and were able to keep the ball even though the return man fumbled the kick and Memphis recovered. With the free kick catch penalty leveled on the Tigers the Bearcats started with the ball deep in Tiger territory. Michael Warren II opened the scoring with a 6-yard run. Memphis answered with a pair of scores, the second being a 65-yard run by RB Antonio Gibson. The Tigers had a 10–7 lead at the end of the first quarter. The Bearcats capped off a 7-play 80-yard drive with a 15-yard run by Desmond Ridder who return to the starting lineup after missing a game. The Bearcats took lead into halftime. The Tigers went 75 yards on the 2nd half kickoff and Memphis QB Brady White later scored from a yard out. Michael Warren crashed in from a yard out on the ensuing drive which covered 9 plays and 75 yards. Riley Patterson validated his 1st team all-AAC selection by booming a 52-yard field goal and heading into the final quarter, the Bearcats held a narrow 21–20 lead. Patterson nailed his 2nd 50-yard field goal 13 seconds into the 4th and the Tigers took back the lead. After a Sam Crosa 33-yard field goal, the Tigers marched back down the field and with 1:14 left in the game, the Tigers put the 8th lead change on the board with a White to Gibson TD pass. The game had seen everything but an ending, as the Bearcats raced back downfield without the benefit of a timeout. The last gasp drive stalled at the Tiger 25 with Ridder misfiring on his last four passes. The Bearcats with the loss fell to 10–3, but accepted a bid to the Birmingham Bowl to be played on January 2 against Boston College.

=== Vs. Boston College (Birmingham Bowl) ===
Cincinnati vs. Boston College (Birmingham Bowl) – Game Summary

Quarter	1	2	3	4	Total
Eagles	0	0	6	0	6
No. 21 Bearcats	7	10	7	14	38

at Legion Field, Birmingham, AL

- Date: January 2, 2020
- Game time: 3:00 p.m. (2:00 p.m. CST)
- Game weather: 55F Rainy
- Game attendance: 27,193
- Referee: Greg Sujack
- TV announcers (ESPN/Bowlday Radio): Kevin Brown (play-by-play), Andre Ware (color), and Dawn Davenport (sideline)/Travis Jones (play-by-play), John Denton (color), and Melanie Newman (sideline)

Game information

First Quarter

- UC (1:26) Desmond Ridder 13 Run (Sam Crosa Kick) 10 plays, 79 yards, 3:45 UC 7–0

Second Quarter

- UC (8:20) Sam Crosa 32 FG 16 plays, 63 yards, 6:31 UC 10–0
- UC (7:05) Desmond Ridder 14 Run (Sam Crosa Kick) 1 play, 19 yards, 0:06 UC 17–0

Third Quarter

- UC (9:02) Malick Mbodj 8 Pass From Desmond Ridder (Sam Crosa Kick) 12 plays, 75 yards, 5:58 UC 24–0
- BC (4:56) Brandon Sebastian 67 Blocked Field Goal Return (2 Pt pass conversion Failed) UC 24–6

Fourth Quarter

- UC (13:06) Desmond Ridder 13 Run (Sam Crosa Kick) 12 plays, 65 yards, 6:50 UC 31–6
- UC (0:39) Ryan Montgomery 1 Run (Sam Crosa Kick) 12 plays, 63 yards, 5:13 UC 38–6

Passing

- BC Dennis Grosel 8–17 87 Yds
- CIN Ridder 14–24 95 Yds 1TD

Rushing

- BC David Bailey 8 Carries 28 Yds
- CIN Ridder 21 Carries 105 Yds 3 TD, Warren II 21 Carries 105 Yds

Receiving

- BC Hunter Long 2 Receptions 45 Yards
- CIN Jackson 2 Receptions 33 Yards

Playing in only their fourth January Bowl Game, the 21st Ranked Bearcats traveled to Birmingham to face Boston College from the ACC in the Ticketsmarter Birmingham Bowl. This would be the second time that the Bearcats had played a bowl game in this venue, having beaten Southern Mississippi in the 2007 Papa John's Bowl. The Bearcats dominated the game from start to finish and finished their season on a victorious note as they routed the Eagles 38–6 to notch their biggest bowl game victory margin in their bowl history. Played under cloudy threatening skies, the Eagles came into the game doubly hampered as head coach Steve Addazio had been fired before accepting the bowl bid and wide receivers coach Rich Gunnell would be interim head coach with newly hired Jeff Hafley on hand only as an observer. Star RB AJ Dillon declared for the NFL draft and announced that he would skip the bowl game. The Bearcats seniors were led by LB Perry Young, a Birmingham native who would be playing his final game in front of his hometown crowd. The Bearcats and Eagles played tentatively at the start, which was played under a steady downpour and then delayed as lightning was detected in the area. After a 92-minute delay the teams returned to the field and the Bearcats broke into the scoring column with a 13-yard run by Desmond Ridder. BC put together its best drive but Aaron Bouhmerhi's 40-yard field goal attempt was blocked. That would forebode many of the Eagles offensive struggles. The Bearcats took possession after the miss and drove downfield resulting in a Sam Crosa 32-yard field goal to increase the Bearcat lead to 10–0. The Eagles continued to struggle against the stout Bearcat defense. Two plays into the subsequent BC drive, Eagle QB Dennis Grosel was sacked by Ethan Tucky and fumbled the ball. Bryan Wright recovered the fumble and the Bearcats were in excellent scoring position at the BC 19. After a BC penalty, Ridder notched his second rushing touchdown of the day with a 14-yard scamper. The Bearcats took a 17–0 lead into the half. The Bearcats opened the 2nd half with a punishing 12-play 75-yard drive that ate nearly 6 minutes off the clock. Ridder found Malick Mbodj, who made an excellent one-handed TD grab, to increase the lead to 24–0. The Eagles again went three-and-out and the Bearcats' next drive stalled at the BC 26 yard line. Long distance field goal specialist Cole Smith was called on to try a 43-yard field goal, but the kick was blocked by BC's Mike Palmer and Brandon Sebastian picked up the loose ball and raced 65 yards the other way for an Eagles' touchdown. BC attempted a two-point conversion, but the pass was incomplete. The Bearcats produced another long drive that spanned the end of the 3rd quarter and the beginning of the 4th. Early in the 4th, Ridder romped into the end zone for his third TD of the game and gave the Bearcats a commanding 31–6 lead. Bearcats head coach Luke Fickell cleared the bench and got many players some bowl experience. Ryan Montgomery capped the Bearcats final drive with a touchdown from a yard out with under a minute to go to make the final score 38–6. The 32 point victory margin was the largest in a bowl game since the 1947 Bearcats defeated Virginia Tech 33–13 in the Glass Bowl Cincinnati notched a school bowl game record in first downs (33), total plays (91), held BC to 164 total yards (87 passing, 77 rushing) a miserly 0–11 on third down conversions, and held the ball offense for 41:29. The Eagles scored zero points on offense and the Bearcats ran more plays in BC territory 51, than the Eagles ran for the whole game (44) With a school bowl record 4 touchdowns (3 Rushing, 1 Passing) Desmond Ridder was named game MVP. Senior TE Josiah Deguara finished his Bearcat career with 92 receptions, a school record for tight ends. The Bearcats won their 2nd consecutive bowl game for the first time since 2012 and finished with 11 wins for only the 4th time in school history. The Bearcats finished the season with 10+ wins for the 7th time in the previous 13 seasons and in the national ranking in back to back seasons for the first time since 2008–2009.

== Personnel ==
=== Roster and staff ===
2019 Cincinnati Bearcats football team roster
Players
Coaches
Offense

Pos.	#	Name	Class
WR	1	L'Christian Smith	Fr
WR	2	Jayshon Jackson	So
RB	3	Michael Warren II	Jr
WR	4	Thomas Geddis	Sr
RB	5	Tavion Thomas	So
QB	6	Ben Bryant	Fr
WR	7	Javan Hawes	Jr
WR	8	Malick Mbodj	Jr
QB	9	Desmond Ridder	So
RB	10	Charles McClelland	So
QB	10	Jake Sopko	Jr
TE	11	Leonard Taylor	So
WR	12	Alec Pierce	So
WR	13	Trent Cloud	So
WR	15	Garyn Prater	So
QB	16	Michael Lindauer	Fr
WR	17	Rashad Medaris	Sr
QB	18	Cameron Jones	Fr
QB	19	Cole Kosco	Fr
WR	21	Tre Tucker	Fr
RB	22	Ryan Montgomery	Fr
RB	23	Gerrid Doaks	Jr
RB	24	JJ Davis	Fr
RB	25	Cameron Young	Jr
WR	26	Jerron Rollins	Sr
RB	30	Michael Kopaygorodsky	So
WR	32	Jiair Thomas	Fr
RB	41	Colin Thurman	Fr
OL	50	Dylan O'Quinn	Fr
OL	51	Lorenz Metz	Fr
OL	52	Jakari Robinson	So
OL	54	Alex Heil	GS
OL	55	James Hudson	So
OL	58	Darius Harper	Jr
OL	60	Zach Bycznski	Jr
OL	65	Cody Lamb	So
OL	66	Ethan Voelker	Fr
OL	71	Colin Woodside	Fr
OL	72	Jonathan Allen	Fr
OL	74	Jeremy Cooper	Fr
OL	75	Chris Ferguson	GS
OL	76	Marcelo Mendiola	Fr
OL	77	Vincent McConnell	So
OL	78	Morgan James	GS
TE	81	Josh Whyle	Fr
TE	82	Wilson Huber	So
TE	83	Josiah Deguara	GS
WR	84	Wyatt Fischer	Fr
WR	85	Bray Ginyard	Fr
TE	86	Jack Campbell	Fr
TE	87	Bruno Labelle	Jr
WR	89	Bryant Johnson II	Fr

Defense

Pos.	#	Name	Class
S	3	Ja'von Hicks	So
CB	4	Justin Harris	Fr
S	5	Darrick Forrest	Jr
LB	6	Perry Young	Sr
CB	7	Coby Bryant	Jr
LB	8	Jarell White	Jr
CB	9	Arquon Bush	Fr
LB	11	Bryan Wright	GS
CB	12	Sauce Gardner	Fr
LB	13	Ty Van Fossen	Fr
CB	14	Cameron Jeffries	GS
CB	15	Taj Ward	Fr
CB	16	Aulden Knight	Jr
LB	17	Dorian Holloway	Fr
CB	18	Josiah Robey	So
DE	19	Ethan Tucky	Jr
S	20	Bryan Cook	Jr
DE	21	Myjai Sanders	So
S	22	Collin Widecan	Jr
LB	23	RJ Potts	So
CB	25	TJ Johnson	Jr
S	26	Kyriq McDonald	So
LB	27	Darrian Beavers	Jr
S	29	Jacob Dingle	Fr
LB	30	Brody Ingle	Fr
CB	31	Casey Kirk	So
S	32	James Wiggins	Jr
DE	33	Blake Bacevich	Fr
LB	34	Kyle Bolden	So
LB	35	Ryan Royer	So
S	36	Will Adams	Fr
DE	37	Steven Hawthorne	Fr
CB	38	Jake Tewart	Fr
S	39	Ja'Quan Sheppard	Fr
LB	40	DeMarco Baker	Fr
LB	41	Joel Dublanko	Jr
DE	42	Malik Vann	So
DE	43	Michael Pitts	Jr
LB	44	Mick Oakes	Fr
LB	45	Tinashe Bere	GS
LB	46	Grant Horvath	Fr
LB	47	Nate Lawler	Fr
DE	48	Kevin Mouhon	Sr
LB	50	Jackson Bruscianelli	Fr
DT	52	Daeshon Martin	Fr
DE	54	Izaiah Ruffin	Fr
DE	55	Zach Hummel	Fr
DE	57	Ryan Mullaney	Fr
DE	86	Angelo Howze	So
DT	89	Nick Staderman	Jr
DT	90	Jabari Taylor	So
DT	92	Curtis Brooks	Jr
DT	93	Elijah Ponder	Jr
DT	94	Chase Brown	Fr
DT	95	Joe Schroer	Sr
DT	97	Eric Phillips	Fr
DE	98	Mychal Keys	Fr
DT	99	Marcus Brown	Jr

Special teams

Pos.	#	Name	Class
K	19	Cole Smith	So
P	25	Tyler Inloes	Fr
K	31	Sam Crosa	GS
P	37	James Smith	Jr
K	39	Bryce Burton	Fr
LS	57	Cory Armstrong	Jr
LS	59	Zach Wood	GS
LS	74	Blake Bammann	Fr
K	91	Alex Bales	Fr
LS	96	Cayson Pfeiffer	Fr
K	97	Ryan Jones	GS
K	98	Grant Simon	Fr

Head coach

- Luke Fickell (Ohio State) – 3rd year

Coordinators/assistant coaches

- Mike Denbrock (Grand Valley State)
  3rd year – (Offensive Coordinator/ Tight Ends)
- Marcus Freeman (Ohio State)
  3rd year – (Defensive Coordinator/ Linebackers)
- Brian Mason (Denison)
  2nd year – (Special Teams Coordinator)
- Mike Brown (Liberty)
  1st year – (Wide Receivers)
- Ron Crook (West Liberty State)
  3rd year – (Offensive Line)
- Gino Guidugli (Cincinnati)
  3rd year – (Quarterbacks)
- Mike Mickens (Cincinnati)
  2nd year – (Cornerbacks)
- Doug Phillips (Toledo)
  3rd year – (Running Backs)
- Jon Tenuta (Virginia)
  3rd year – (Safeties)
- Chad Wilt (Taylor)
  1st year – (Defensive Line)

Legend

- (C) Team captain
- (S) Suspended
- (I) Ineligible
- Injured
- Redshirt

Roster

=== Depth chart ===
Defense

FS
James Wiggins
Kyriq McDonald
⋅

WLB	MLB	SLB
Perry Young	Bryan Wright	Darrian Beavers
⋅	Joel Dublanko	Jarell White
⋅	⋅	R.J. Potts

SS
Darrick Forrest
Ja'von Hicks
⋅

CB
Coby Bryant
Sauce Gardner
⋅

DE	DT	DT	DE
Myjai Sanders	Jabari Taylor	Elijah Ponder	Michael Pitts
Malik Vann	Marcus Brown	Curtis Brooks	Ethan Tucky
Kevin Mouhan	⋅	⋅	⋅

CB
Cameron Jeffries
Taj Ward
Justin Harris

Offense

WR
Trent Cloud
Javan Hawes
Wyatt Fischer

WR
Alec Pierce
Thomas Geddis
Yanez Rogers

LT	LG	C	RG	RT
Chris Ferguson	Jeremy Cooper	Jakari Robinson	Morgan James	Lorenz Metz
Darius Harper	Marcelo Mendiola	Zach Bycznski	Dylan O'Quinn	Vincent McConnell
⋅	⋅	⋅	⋅	⋅

TE
Josiah Deguara
Bruno Labelle
Josh Whyle

WR
Rashad Medaris
Jayshon Jackson
Tre Tucker

QB
Desmond Ridder
Ben Bryant
Jack Sopko

Special teams
PK Sam Crosa
PK Cole Smith
P James Smith
P Tyler Inloes
KR Tre Tucker, James Wiggins, Ryan Montgomery
PR Ryan Montgomery, Aulden Knight
LS Zach Wood, Blake Bammann
H James Smith, Jake Sopko

RB
Michael Warren II
Gerrid Doaks
Charles McClelland

== Rankings ==
Ranking movements Legend: ██ Increase in ranking ██ Decrease in ranking RV = Received votes
	Week																
Poll	Pre	1	2	3	4	5	6	7	8	9	10	11	12	13	14	15	Final
AP	RV	RV	RV	RV	RV	RV	25	21	18	17	17	17	17	18	21	23	21
Coaches	RV	RV	RV	RV	RV	RV	RV	21	18	18	17	17	17	17	21	22	21
CFP	Not released										20	17	19	19	20	21	Not released

== Awards and milestones ==
American Athletic Conference Weekly Awards
Player	Award	Date Awarded	Ref.
Desmond Ridder	Co-Offensive Player of the Week	September 30, 2019	
Jarell White	Defensive Player of the Week	October 7, 2019	
James Smith	Special Teams Player of the Week	October 7, 2019	
Ja'Von Hicks	Defensive Player of the Week	October 14, 2019	
Sam Crosa	Special Teams Player of the Week	November 18, 2019	
Darrick Forrest	Defensive Player of the Week	November 25, 2019	

All-AAC
Player	Position	Team
Josiah Deguara	TE	1
Sauce Gardner	CB	1
Perry Young	LB	1
Darrick Forrest	S	1
Morgan James	G	1
Elijah Ponder	DL	1
Bryan Wright	LB	1
James Smith	P	2
Michael Warren II	RB	2
Sam Crosa	K	HM
Ja'Von Hicks	S	HM

== Players drafted into the NFL ==
Round	Pick	Player	Position	NFL Club
3	94	Josiah Deguara	TE	Green Bay Packers
