= 2019 Temple Owls football team =

American college football season

2019 Temple Owls football

Military Bowl, L 13–55 vs. North Carolina
- Conference: American Athletic Conference
- East Division
- Record: 8–5 (5–3 The American)
- Head coach: Rod Carey (1st season)
- Offensive coordinator: Mike Uremovich (1st season)
- Offensive scheme: Multiple
- Defensive coordinator: Jeff Knowles (1st season)
- Base defense: 3–4
- Home stadium: Lincoln Financial Field

Uniform
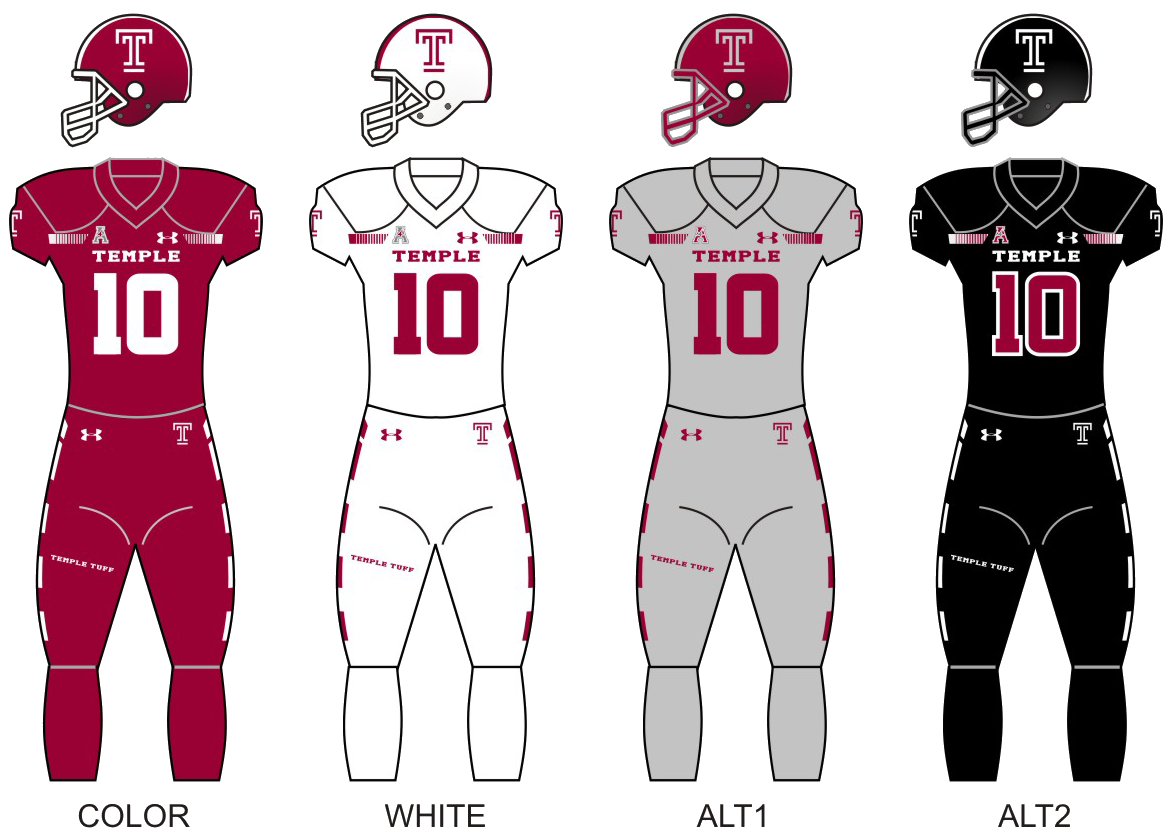

2019 American Athletic Conference football standings
	Conf.			Overall
Team	W		L	W		L
East Division
No. 21 Cincinnati xy	7	–	1	11	–	3
No. 24 UCF	6	–	2	10	–	3
Temple	5	–	3	8	–	5
South Florida	2	–	6	4	–	8
East Carolina	1	–	7	4	–	8
UConn	0	–	8	2	–	10
West Division
No. 17 Memphis xy$	7	–	1	12	–	2
No. 20 Navy x	7	–	1	11	–	2
SMU	6	–	2	10	–	3
Tulane	3	–	5	7	–	6
Houston	2	–	6	4	–	8
Tulsa	2	–	6	4	–	8
Championship: Memphis 29, Cincinnati 24
$ – Conference champion; x – Division champion/co-champions; y – Championship game participant; Rankings from AP Poll

The 2019 Temple Owls football team represented Temple University during the 2019 NCAA Division I FBS football season. The Owls were led by first-year head coach Rod Carey and played their home games at Lincoln Financial Field, competing as a member of the East Division of the American Athletic Conference (AAC).

== Preseason ==
=== Award watch lists ===
Listed in the order that they were released

Award	Player	Position	Year
Rimington Trophy	Matt Hennessy	C	R-JR
Chuck Bednarik Award	Shaun Bradley	LB	SR
John Mackey Award	Kenny Yeboah	TE	R-JR
Bronko Nagurski Trophy	Shaun Bradley	LB	SR
Paul Hornung Award	Isaiah Wright	WR/KR	SR
Maxwell Award	Anthony Russo	QB	R-JR
Dick Butkus Award	Chapelle Russell	LB	R-SR
Outland Trophy	Jovahn Fair	OG	R-SR
Wuerffel Trophy	Matt Hennessy	C	R-JR
William V. Campbell Trophy	Zack Mesday	DE	GS

=== AAC media poll ===
The AAC media poll was released on July 16, 2019, with the Owls predicted to finish fourth in the AAC East Division.

== Schedule ==
Date	Time	Opponent	Site	TV	Result	Attendance
August 31	3:00 p.m.	Bucknell*	Lincoln Financial Field; Philadelphia, PA	ESPN3	W 56–12	26,378
September 14	12:00 p.m.	No. 21 Maryland*	Lincoln Financial Field; Philadelphia, PA	CBSSN	W 20–17	30,610
September 21	3:30 p.m.	at Buffalo*	University at Buffalo Stadium; Buffalo, NY	ESPNU	L 22–38	17,621
September 28	3:30 p.m.	Georgia Tech*	Lincoln Financial Field; Philadelphia, PA	CBSSN	W 24–2	31,094
October 3	8:00 p.m.	at East Carolina	Dowdy–Ficklen Stadium; Greenville, NC	ESPN	W 27–17	33,253
October 12	12:00 p.m.	No. 23 Memphis^{†}	Lincoln Financial Field; Philadelphia, PA	ESPN2	W 30–28	34,253
October 19	3:30 p.m.	at No. 19 SMU	Gerald J. Ford Stadium; University Park, TX	ESPN2	L 21–45	23,132
October 26	7:00 p.m.	UCF	Lincoln Financial Field; Philadelphia, PA	ESPN2	L 21–63	29,949
November 7	8:00 p.m.	at South Florida	Raymond James Stadium; Tampa, FL	ESPN	W 17–7	26,214
November 16	12:00 p.m.	Tulane	Lincoln Financial Field; Philadelphia, PA	ESPNU	W 29–21	27,850
November 23	7:00 p.m.	at No. 19 Cincinnati	Nippert Stadium; Cincinnati, OH	ESPN2	L 13–15	30,101
November 30	3:30 p.m.	UConn	Lincoln Financial Field; Philadelphia, PA	CBSSN	W 49–17	26,083
December 27	12:00 p.m.	vs. North Carolina*	Navy–Marine Corps Memorial Stadium; Annapolis, MD (Military Bowl)	ESPN	L 13–55	24,242
*Non-conference game; ^{†}Homecoming; Rankings from AP Poll and CFP Rankings after November 5 released prior to game; All times are in Eastern time

== Game summaries ==
=== Bucknell ===
	1	2	3	4	Total
Bison	0	9	3	0	12
Owls	21	14	7	14	56

=== Maryland ===
	1	2	3	4	Total
No. 21 Terrapins	2	0	13	2	17
Owls	7	0	6	7	20

=== At Buffalo ===
	1	2	3	4	Total
Owls	7	0	3	12	22
Bulls	0	24	7	7	38

=== Georgia Tech ===
	1	2	3	4	Total
Yellow Jackets	0	0	2	0	2
Owls	0	14	10	0	24

=== At East Carolina ===
	1	2	3	4	Total
Owls	0	17	7	3	27
Pirates	7	3	0	7	17

=== Memphis ===
	1	2	3	4	Total
No. 23 Tigers	0	14	7	7	28
Owls	13	10	0	7	30

=== At SMU ===
	1	2	3	4	Total
Owls	0	7	7	7	21
No. 19 Mustangs	10	14	7	14	45

=== UCF ===
	1	2	3	4	Total
Knights	14	14	28	7	63
Owls	7	14	0	0	21

=== At South Florida ===
	1	2	3	4	Total
Owls	0	7	7	3	17
Bulls	0	0	7	0	7

=== Tulane ===
	1	2	3	4	Total
Green Wave	0	7	0	14	21
Owls	3	10	9	7	29

=== At Cincinnati ===
	1	2	3	4	Total
Owls	0	0	0	13	13
No. 19 Bearcats	0	6	7	2	15

=== UConn ===
	1	2	3	4	Total
Huskies	14	3	0	0	17
Owls	7	7	28	7	49

=== Vs. North Carolina — Military Bowl ===
	1	2	3	4	Total
Tar Heels	7	13	21	14	55
Owls	0	6	7	0	13

== Rankings ==
Ranking movements Legend: ██ Increase in ranking ██ Decrease in ranking — = Not ranked RV = Received votes
	Week																
Poll	Pre	1	2	3	4	5	6	7	8	9	10	11	12	13	14	15	Final
AP	—	—	—	—	RV	—	—	RV	—	—	—	—	—	—	—	—	
Coaches	RV	—	—	—	RV	—	RV	25	RV	—	—	—	RV	RV	RV	—	
CFP	Not released										—	—	—	—	—	—	Not released

== Players drafted into the NFL ==
Round	Pick	Player	Position	NFL Club
3	78	Matt Hennessy	C	Atlanta Falcons
5	169	Harrison Hand	CB	Minnesota Vikings
6	196	Shaun Bradley	ILB	Philadelphia Eagles
7	241	Chapelle Russell	OLB	Tampa Bay Buccaneers
