= 2019 American Athletic Conference Football Championship Game =

- 5th AAC Championship Game
Cincinnati Bearcats	Memphis Tigers
(10–2)	(11–1)
24	29
Head coach: Luke Fickell	Head coach: Mike Norvell
AP / Coaches / CFP; 21 / 21 / 20	AP / Coaches / CFP; 16 / 16 / 17
	1	2	3	4	Total
Cincinnati	7	7	7	3	24
Memphis	10	0	10	9	29
- Date: December 7, 2019
- Season: 2019
- Stadium: Liberty Bowl Memorial Stadium
- Location: Memphis, TN
- MVP: Antonio Gibson (RB, Memphis)
- Favorite: Memphis by 9
- Referee: Charles Lamertina
- Attendance: 33,008

United States TV coverage
- Network: ABC
- Announcers: Dave Pasch (play-by-play), Greg McElroy (analyst) and Tom Luginbill (sideline)

2019 American Athletic Conference football standings
	Conf.			Overall
Team	W		L	W		L
East Division
No. 21 Cincinnati xy	7	–	1	11	–	3
No. 24 UCF	6	–	2	10	–	3
Temple	5	–	3	8	–	5
South Florida	2	–	6	4	–	8
East Carolina	1	–	7	4	–	8
UConn	0	–	8	2	–	10
West Division
No. 17 Memphis xy$	7	–	1	12	–	2
No. 20 Navy x	7	–	1	11	–	2
SMU	6	–	2	10	–	3
Tulane	3	–	5	7	–	6
Houston	2	–	6	4	–	8
Tulsa	2	–	6	4	–	8
Championship: Memphis 29, Cincinnati 24
$ – Conference champion; x – Division champion/co-champions; y – Championship game participant; Rankings from AP Poll

The 2019 American Athletic Conference Football Championship Game was a college football game played on December 7, 2019, at Liberty Bowl Memorial Stadium in Memphis, Tennessee, to determine the 2019 champion of the American Athletic Conference. The conference's 5th championship game featured the champion of its East Division, the Cincinnati Bearcats, against the West Division champion, the Memphis Tigers. The game was televised on ABC.

The game is hosted by the divisional champion with the better winning percentage in conference games. Memphis claimed hosting rights with a 34–24 home win over Cincinnati to close out the regular season on November 29. This left both teams with a 7–1 conference record, with Memphis holding the tiebreaker due to the Tigers' head-to-head win. Navy ultimately tied Memphis for the West Division crown, but the Tigers also held that tiebreaker due to a head-to-head win.

== Teams ==
=== Cincinnati ===
The Cincinnati Bearcats clinched the AAC East, and a berth in the Championship Game, with a win over Temple on November 23. This is Cincinnati's first Championship Game appearance.

=== Memphis ===
Memphis clinched at least a share of the West Division title with their November 29 win over Cincinnati, and also claimed hosting rights by virtue of holding all possible tiebreakers.

== Game summary ==
2019 American Athletic Conference Football Championship Game

Quarter	1	2	3	4	Total
No. 20 Cincinnati	7	7	7	3	24
No. 17 Memphis	10	0	10	9	29

at Liberty Bowl Memorial Stadium • Memphis, TN

- Date: Saturday, December 7, 2019
- Game time: 3:30 p.m. EST (2:30 p.m. CST)
- Game attendance: 33,008
- Referee: Charles Lamertina
- TV announcers (ABC): Dave Pasch (play-by-play), Greg McElroy (analyst) and Tom Luginbill (sideline)
- ESPN game summary

Game information

First Quarter

- (12:27) CIN – Michael Warren 6 yard rush, Sam Crosa kick (Drive: 6 plays, 30 yards, 2:33; Cincinnati 7–0)
- (8:21) MEM – Riley Patterson 29 yard field goal (Drive: 12 plays, 64 yards, 3:59; Cincinnati 7–3)
- (2:36) MEM – Antonio Gibson 65 yard rush, Riley Patterson kick (Drive: 7 plays, 97 yards, 2:29; Memphis 10–7)

Second Quarter

- (2:37) CIN – Desmond Ridder 15 yard rush, Sam Crosa kick (Drive: 7 plays, 80 yards, 2:09; Cincinnati 14–10)

Third Quarter

- (11:59) MEM – Brady White 1 yard rush, Riley Patterson kick (Drive: 7 plays, 75 yards, 2:56; Memphis 17–14)
- (7:21) CIN – Michael Warren 3 yard rush, Sam Crosa kick (Drive: 9 plays, 75 yards, 4:38; Cincinnati 21–17)
- (3:54) MEM – Riley Patterson 52 yard field goal (Drive: 10 plays, 41 yards, 3:27; Cincinnati 21–20)

Fourth Quarter

- (14:47) MEM – Riley Patterson 50 yard field goal (Drive: 11 plays, 31 yards, 3:54; Memphis 23–21)
- (4:23) CIN – Sam Crosa 33 yard field goal (Drive: 13 plays, 54 yards, 6:27; Cincinnati 24–23)
- (1:14) MEM – Brady White 6 yard pass to Antonio Gibson, 2-point pass failed (Drive: 10 plays, 75 yards, 3:09; Memphis 29–24)

=== Statistics ===
Statistics	CIN	MEM
First downs	21	25
Plays–yards	76–454	85–447
Rushes–yards	39–221	45–194
Passing yards	233	253
Passing: comp–att–int	16–37–1	18–40–1
Time of possession	28:58	31:02

Team	Category	Player	Statistics
Cincinnati	Passing	Desmond Ridder	16/36, 233 yards, 1 INT
Cincinnati	Rushing	Desmond Ridder	11 carries, 113 yards, 1 TD
Cincinnati	Receiving	Alec Pierce	5 receptions, 87 yards
Memphis	Passing	Brady White	18/40, 253 yards, 1 TD, 1 INT
Memphis	Rushing	Antonio Gibson	11 carries, 130 yards, 1 TD
Memphis	Receiving	Damonte Coxie	9 receptions, 165 yards
