= 2019 South Florida Bulls football team =

American college football season

2019 South Florida Bulls football
- Conference: American Athletic Conference
- Record: 4–8 (2–6 AAC)
- Head coach: Charlie Strong (3rd season)
- Offensive coordinator: Kerwin Bell (1st season)
- Offensive scheme: Fun and gun
- Defensive coordinator: Brian Jean-Mary (3rd season)
- Base defense: 3–3–5
- Home stadium: Raymond James Stadium

2019 American Athletic Conference football standings
	Conf.			Overall
Team	W		L	W		L
East Division
No. 21 Cincinnati xy	7	–	1	11	–	3
No. 24 UCF	6	–	2	10	–	3
Temple	5	–	3	8	–	5
South Florida	2	–	6	4	–	8
East Carolina	1	–	7	4	–	8
UConn	0	–	8	2	–	10
West Division
No. 17 Memphis xy$	7	–	1	12	–	2
No. 20 Navy x	7	–	1	11	–	2
SMU	6	–	2	10	–	3
Tulane	3	–	5	7	–	6
Houston	2	–	6	4	–	8
Tulsa	2	–	6	4	–	8
Championship: Memphis 29, Cincinnati 24
$ – Conference champion; x – Division champion/co-champions; y – Championship game participant; Rankings from AP Poll

The 2019 South Florida Bulls football team represented the University of South Florida (USF) during the 2019 NCAA Division I FBS football season. The Bulls were led by third-year head coach Charlie Strong and played their home games at Raymond James Stadium in Tampa, Florida. They competed as members of the East Division of the American Athletic Conference. They finished the season 4–8, 2–6 in AAC play to finish in fourth place in the East Division.

On December 2, head coach Charlie Strong was fired. He finished at South Florida with a three-year record of 21–16.

== Preseason ==
=== Coaching changes ===
In January 2019, South Florida hired Kerwin Bell as their new offensive coordinator, replacing Sterlin Gilbert, who left to take the head coaching job at McNeese State. Bell had spent the previous three seasons as the head coach at Valdosta State, where he led the school to an NCAA Division II national title in 2018.

=== AAC media poll ===
The AAC media poll was released on July 16, 2019, with the Bulls predicted to finish third in the AAC East Division.

=== Preseason award watch lists ===
Heading into the 2019 season, five Bulls were named to various award watch lists: Blake Barnett (Johnny Unitas Golden Arm Award), Coby Weiss (Lou Groza Award), Marcus Norman (Outland Trophy), Mike Hampton (Jim Thorpe Award), and Mitchell Wilcox (John Mackey Award).

== Schedule ==
South Florida's 2019 schedule would begin with three non-conference games: at home against Wisconsin of the Big Ten Conference, then on the road against Georgia Tech of the Atlantic Coast Conference (ACC), and then at home again against South Carolina State of the Mid-Eastern Athletic Conference (MEAC). Their fourth non-conference game would be played at home against BYU, a football independent, after the start of the conference schedule. In American Athletic Conference play, the Bulls would play the other members of the East Division and draw Memphis, Navy, and SMU from the West Division. They would not play Houston, Tulane, or Tulsa as part of the regular season.

Date	Time	Opponent	Site	TV	Result	Attendance
August 30	7:00 p.m.	No. 19 Wisconsin*	Raymond James Stadium; Tampa, FL	ESPN	L 0–49	46,704
September 7	2:00 p.m.	at Georgia Tech*	Bobby Dodd Stadium; Atlanta, GA	ACCN	L 10–14	46,599
September 14	6:00 p.m.	South Carolina State*	Raymond James Stadium; Tampa, FL	ESPN3	W 55–16	31,368
September 28	4:00 p.m.	SMU	Raymond James Stadium; Tampa, FL	ESPNU	L 21–48	28,850
October 5	12:00 p.m.	at UConn	Rentschler Field; East Hartford, CT	CBSSN	W 48–22	18,038
October 12	3:30 p.m.	BYU*^{†}	Raymond James Stadium; Tampa, FL	CBSSN	W 27–23	35,375
October 19	3:30 p.m.	at Navy	Navy–Marine Corps Memorial Stadium; Annapolis, MD	CBSSN	L 3–35	29,774
October 26	3:45 p.m.	at East Carolina	Dowdy–Ficklen Stadium; Greenville, NC	ESPNU	W 45–20	33,088
November 7	8:00 p.m.	Temple	Raymond James Stadium; Tampa, FL	ESPN	L 7–17	26,214
November 16	7:00 p.m.	No. 17 Cincinnati	Raymond James Stadium; Tampa, FL	CBSSN	L 17–20	29,112
November 23	4:00 p.m.	No. 18 Memphis	Raymond James Stadium; Tampa, FL	ESPNU	L 10–49	25,136
November 29	8:00 p.m.	at UCF	Spectrum Stadium; Orlando, FL (War on I–4)	ESPN	L 7–34	45,216
*Non-conference game; ^{†}Homecoming; Rankings from AP Poll and CFP Rankings after November 5 released prior to game; All times are in Eastern time

== Game summaries ==
=== Wisconsin ===
	1	2	3	4	Total
No. 19 Badgers	7	21	14	7	49
Bulls	0	0	0	0	0

=== At Georgia Tech ===
	1	2	3	4	Total
Bulls	3	0	0	7	10
Yellow Jackets	0	14	0	0	14

=== South Carolina State ===
	1	2	3	4	Total
Bulldogs	3	0	6	7	16
Bulls	7	17	17	14	55

=== SMU ===
	1	2	3	4	Total
Mustangs	14	20	7	7	48
Bulls	0	0	7	14	21

=== At UConn ===
	1	2	3	4	Total
Bulls	7	20	7	14	48
Huskies	0	14	0	8	22

=== BYU ===
	1	2	3	4	Total
Cougars	3	13	7	0	23
Bulls	0	7	7	13	27

=== At Navy ===
	1	2	3	4	Total
Bulls	0	3	0	0	3
Midshipmen	7	14	0	14	35

=== At East Carolina ===
	1	2	3	4	Total
Bulls	14	21	3	7	45
Pirates	7	3	0	10	20

=== Temple ===
	1	2	3	4	Total
Owls	0	7	7	3	17
Bulls	0	0	7	0	7

=== Cincinnati ===
	1	2	3	4	Total
No. 17 Bearcats	0	0	10	10	20
Bulls	7	3	7	0	17

=== Memphis ===
	1	2	3	4	Total
No. 18 Tigers	7	21	14	7	49
Bulls	10	0	0	0	10

=== At UCF ===
	1	2	3	4	Total
Bulls	0	0	7	0	7
Knights	7	17	7	3	34
