= 2019 UCF Knights football team =

American college football season

2019 UCF Knights football

Gasparilla Bowl champion

Gasparilla Bowl, W 48–25 vs. Marshall
- Conference: American Athletic Conference
- East Division

Ranking
- Coaches: No. 24
- AP: No. 24
- Record: 10–3 (6–2 AAC)
- Head coach: Josh Heupel (2nd season)
- Offensive coordinator: Jeff Lebby (1st season)
- Offensive scheme: Veer and shoot
- Defensive coordinator: Randy Shannon (2nd season)
- Base defense: 4–3
- Home stadium: Spectrum Stadium

2019 American Athletic Conference football standings
	Conf.			Overall
Team	W		L	W		L
East Division
No. 21 Cincinnati xy	7	–	1	11	–	3
No. 24 UCF	6	–	2	10	–	3
Temple	5	–	3	8	–	5
South Florida	2	–	6	4	–	8
East Carolina	1	–	7	4	–	8
UConn	0	–	8	2	–	10
West Division
No. 17 Memphis xy$	7	–	1	12	–	2
No. 20 Navy x	7	–	1	11	–	2
SMU	6	–	2	10	–	3
Tulane	3	–	5	7	–	6
Houston	2	–	6	4	–	8
Tulsa	2	–	6	4	–	8
Championship: Memphis 29, Cincinnati 24
$ – Conference champion; x – Division champion/co-champions; y – Championship game participant; Rankings from AP Poll

The 2019 UCF Knights football team represented the University of Central Florida (UCF) during the 2019 NCAA Division I FBS football season. The Knights were led by second-year head coach Josh Heupel and played their home games at Spectrum Stadium in Orlando, Florida. They competed as members of the East Division of the American Athletic Conference.

After consecutive undefeated regular seasons in 2017 and 2018, the Knights were looking for their third consecutive conference championship, and third consecutive appearance in a New Year's Six bowl game. They started the season ranked 17th in both the AP and Coaches polls. However, they suffered three road losses (by a combined total of 7 points) to finish 10–3 and in second place in the American Athletic Conference East Division. The Knights were invited to the Gasparilla Bowl where they defeated Marshall by the score of 48–25. At season's end, they ranked 24th in both final polls.

True freshman Dillon Gabriel emerged as the starting quarterback, earning the job over Notre Dame transfer Brandon Wimbush, and returning redshirt sophomore Darriel Mack Jr., who had suffered a broken ankle during the offseason. The Knights finished the season riding a school-record 21 consecutive home game victories at Spectrum Stadium, and the senior class finished with a school-record 41 wins. UCF also established an NCAA Division I FBS record (since the poll era began in 1936) of most consecutive games scoring 30 or more points (31 total). The Knights finished 2nd in the nation in total offensive yards/game (540.5), 8th in passing yards/game (316.7), and 5th in points/game (43.4). During the 2010s, UCF compiled a record of 88–42, the winningest decade in program history.

== Preseason ==
=== AAC media poll ===
The AAC media poll was released on July 16, 2019, with the Knights predicted to win AAC East Division. They were also predicted to win the overall AAC championship.

=== Spring game ===
The 2019 UCF Spring exhibition game was held Saturday April 13 at Spectrum Stadium. The team was split into two squads for gameplay, Team Black and Team Pewter. Quarterback Darriel Mack Jr. threw for 171 yards, including a two-play, 75-yard touchdown drive to open the game. Four quarterbacks saw play during the game, including Quadry Jones, who threw a 71-yard touchdown pass to Rahsaan Lewis.

Date	Time	Spring Game	Site	Result
April 13	2:30 pm	Pewter vs. Black	Spectrum Stadium • Orlando, FL	23–17

=== Training camp ===
Just prior to the start of preseason training camp, quarterback Darriel Mack Jr. suffered a broken ankle in a non-football related incident. Mack had taken over for the injured McKenzie Milton in 2018. Mack was expected to miss all of training camp and part of the regular season. Much of the focus of training camp became the battle for the starting quarterback position between Notre Dame transfer Brandon Wimbush, redshirt freshman Quadry Jones, and true freshman Dillon Gabriel. On August 22, one week before the season opener, head coach Josh Heupel announced that Wimbush would start, while Gabriel "will get an opportunity to play in the first game as well."

=== Ticket sales / stadium ===
On August 12, the UCF athletic department announced that the entire season-ticket allotment was sold out for the first time in school history. In addition, they created a formal waiting list for season tickets, also for the first time. In the press release, UCF athletic director Danny White teased a possible expansion of Spectrum Stadium in the near future if ticket demand remains high.

At the start of the season, the school announced that the field naming rights at Spectrum Stadium were acquired by RoofClaim.com. Logos for the company appeared on the field on 25-yard lines on both ends.

== Schedule ==
UCF's 2019 schedule would begin with four non-conference games, with home games against Florida A&M (MEAC) and Stanford (Pac-12), and road games against FAU (C-USA) and Pitt (ACC). In American Athletic Conference play, the Knights would play the other members of the East Division and face Houston, Tulane and Tulsa from the West Division. They would not play Memphis, Navy, or SMU as part of the regular season. UCF would be idle the weekends of October 12 and November 16.

Date	Time	Opponent	Rank	Site	TV	Result	Attendance
August 29	7:30 p.m.	Florida A&M (FCS)*	No. 17	Spectrum Stadium; Orlando, FL	CBSSN	W 62–0	44,073
September 7	7:00 p.m.	at Florida Atlantic*	No. 18	FAU Stadium; Boca Raton, FL	CBSSN	W 48–14	30,811
September 14	3:30 p.m.	Stanford*	No. 17	Spectrum Stadium; Orlando, FL	ESPN	W 45–27	44,206
September 21	3:30 p.m.	at Pittsburgh*	No. 15	Heinz Field; Pittsburgh, PA	ABC/ESPN2	L 34–35	42,056
September 28	7:00 p.m.	UConn	No. 22	Spectrum Stadium; Orlando, FL (Civil Conflict)	ESPN2	W 56–21	44,164
October 4	8:00 p.m.	at Cincinnati	No. 18	Nippert Stadium; Cincinnati, OH (rivalry)	ESPN	L 24–27	40,121
October 19	7:00 p.m.	East Carolina^{†}		Spectrum Stadium; Orlando, FL	CBSSN	W 41–28	42,906
October 26	7:00 p.m.	at Temple		Lincoln Financial Field; Philadelphia, PA	ESPN2	W 63–21	29,949
November 2	12:00 p.m.	Houston		Spectrum Stadium; Orlando, FL (Space Game)	ESPN2	W 44–29	41,361
November 8	7:00 p.m.	at Tulsa		Skelly Field at H. A. Chapman Stadium; Tulsa, OK	ESPN2	L 31–34	16,331
November 23	12:00 p.m.	at Tulane		Yulman Stadium; New Orleans, LA	CBSSN	W 34–31	21,032
November 29	8:00 p.m.	South Florida		Spectrum Stadium; Orlando, FL (War on I–4)	ESPN	W 34–7	45,216
December 23	2:30 p.m.	vs. Marshall*		Raymond James Stadium; Tampa (Gasparilla Bowl)	ESPN	W 48–25	28,987
*Non-conference game; ^{†}Homecoming; Rankings from AP Poll and CFP Rankings after November 5 released prior to game; All times are in Eastern time

== Rankings ==
Ranking movements Legend: ██ Increase in ranking ██ Decrease in ranking — = Not ranked RV = Received votes т = Tied with team above or below
	Week																
Poll	Pre	1	2	3	4	5	6	7	8	9	10	11	12	13	14	15	Final
AP	17	18	17	15	22	18	RV	RV	RV	RV	RV	RV	—	—	RV	RV	24
Coaches	17-T	17	16	16	23	19	RV	RV	RV	RV	RV	RV	—	—	RV	RV	24
CFP	Not released									—	—	—	—	—	—	—	Not released

== Game summaries ==
=== Florida A&M ===
	1	2	3	4	Total
Rattlers	0	0	0	0	0
No. 17 Knights	17	31	7	7	62

UCF started the season, ranked 17th in both the AP and Coaches poll. The Knights hosted Florida A&M on Thursday night. Brandon Wimbush started at quarterback, but Dillon Gabriel and Quadry Jones also took snaps during the game. The Knights routed the Rattlers 62–0, including a school record-tying 31 points in the second quarter. The trio of quarterbacks combined for 356 passing yards. Wimbush threw two touchdown passes, Gabriel three, and Jones one. Adrian Killins Jr. rushed for 106 yards and one touchdown. The Rattlers were held to only 96 total yards, eight first downs, and had eleven drives go three-and-out.

The Knights extended their home winning streak at Spectrum Stadium to 16 games, and extended their NCAA Division I FBS record of scoring 30+ points to 27 games. However, their active streak of forcing at least one turnover was snapped at 32 games. Despite the big win, the Knights suffered a setback in when CB Brandon "Bam" Moore suffered a knee injury in the third quarter.

=== At Florida Atlantic ===
	1	2	3	4	Total
No. 18 Knights	14	14	13	7	48
Owls	0	6	0	8	14

Freshman Dillon Gabriel started at quarterback, and led the Knights to a 48–14 victory over FAU. Quarterback Brandon Wimbush sat out the game, resting an injury. Gabriel only had 7 completions, but still threw for 245 yards and had two touchdown passes. The Knights rushing, led by Greg McRae, Bentavious Thompson, and Otis Anderson Jr., compiled 312 yards and five touchdowns on the ground. With 4:20 remaining in the fourth quarter, the game was halted due to lightning in the area. Minutes later, the game was called by the officials.

The Knights extended their regular season winning streak to 24 games, and their FBS record streak of scoring 30+ points to 28 games. The team also won their school-record extending 10th consecutive away game.

=== Stanford ===
	1	2	3	4	Total
Cardinal	7	0	3	17	27
No. 17 Knights	28	10	0	7	45

Freshman Dillon Gabriel started at quarterback for the second week in a row, and led the Knights to a decisive 45–27 victory over Stanford. Gabriel threw for 347 yards and four touchdown passes. The Knights led 38–7 at halftime, after touchdown catches by Marlon Williams, Tre Nixon, and Gabe Davis. Otis Anderson Jr. rushed for one touchdown, and Greg McCrae had a 1-yard touchdown run set up by an interception. Defensive Back Aaron Robinson intercepted Stanford quarterback K. J. Costello, returning the ball 40-yards for an apparent touchdown, but after review, it was determined that Robinson was downed at the 1 yard line.

In the second half, UCF added a field goal and another touchdown pass to Jake Hescock. Late in the fourth quarter, Quadry Jones took over at quarterback. With 1:41 remaining in regulation the Knights' only turnover occurred when a fumbled hand off was recovered by Stanford's Jonathan McGill. He returned the ball 28 yards for a Cardinal touchdown, and the 45–27 final score. The Knights won their 25th consecutive regular season game, extended their home winning streak at Spectrum Stadium to 17 games, and also extended their NCAA Division I FBS record of scoring 30+ points to 29 games.

=== At Pittsburgh ===
	1	2	3	4	Total
No. 15 Knights	0	10	21	3	34
Panthers	7	14	7	7	35

Pitt defeated the Knights by the score of 35–34, to snap UCF's regular season winning streak at 27 games. The Knights fell behind 21–0 in the first half, but rallied with 31 unanswered points to take a ten-point lead. In the final minute, the Panthers drove for the game-winning touchdown, scored on trick play dubbed the "Pitt Special".

Freshman quarterback Dillon Gabriel threw two interceptions in the first half, though neither led to points for Pitt. Early in the second quarter, Pitt blocked a UCF punt, and it was recovered by Wendell Davis who returned it 18 yards for a Panthers touchdown. A. J. Davis and Nick Patti both had touchdown runs, and Pitt led 21–0 midway through the second quarter. Momentum would shift in the game, however, as on the next Pitt possession, Davis was tackled and fumbled. UCF recovered at the Pitt 27 yard line. Three plays later, UCF finally got on the board after an 11-yard touchdown run by Adrian Killins Jr. The Knights added a field goal with 4 seconds left in the half, and Pitt took a 21–10 lead into halftime.

The third quarter belonged to the Knights. They forced Pitt to punt to start the second half. Dillon Gabriel completed a 65-yard pass to Gabe Davis, which set up a touchdown and a 21–17 score. On the next possession, Pitt was forced to punt yet again. Otis Anderson Jr. returned the punt 87 yards for a touchdown, and the Knights took the lead for the first time. They extended their lead with a 28-yard touchdown pass to Davis, his second of the game. The UCF defense, however, gave up three costly penalties on the next drive. A Face mask, a Roughing the passer, and a Personal Foul on successive plays, set the Panthers up at the UCF 8 yard line. Nick Patti, in for Kenny Pickett, threw a touchdown pass to Dontavius Butler-Jenkins to make the score 31–28.

With 8:32 left to play, and UCF still leading 31–28, the Knights drove to the Pitt 15 yard line. Facing 4th down & 2, UCF elected to go for it on fourth down, but Greg McRae was tackled a yard short. The Knights turned the ball over on downs, but Pitt followed it up with a three-and-out of their own and punted. The Knights again drove deep into Pitt territory, facing another 4th down, this time at the Pitt 11. After brief consideration, Dylan Barnas kicked a 28-yard field goal, and the Knights clung to a 34–28 lead. Trailing by 6, Pitt drove down to the UCF 3 yard line with 0:59 seconds left in regulation. Facing 4th down & 2 at the 3, Pitt executed a trick play, which was a fake run to the right, then Aaron Mathews threw to on open Kenny Pickett for the game-winning touchdown.

The loss snapped UCF's 10-game away winning streak, but despite the loss, they extended their NCAA Division I FBS record of scoring 30+ points to 30 games.

=== UConn ===
	1	2	3	4	Total
Huskies	0	0	7	14	21
No. 22 Knights	28	14	14	0	56

UCF bounced back after losing the week prior by routing Connecticut 56–21. Quarterback Dillon Gabriel threw for 281 yards and three touchdown passes, despite only playing in the first half. The Knights led 42–0 at halftime, and extended their lead to 56–0 in the third quarter. Darriel Mack Jr. took over at quarterback in the second half, his first significant action since recovering from a broken ankle. Mack threw one touchdown pass and 97 yards passing, and 27 yards rushing. The explosive UCF offense had four touchdown drives under 1 minute in duration. The UCF defense also stifled the Huskies, forcing two interceptions (one returned for a touchdown) and two fumbles.

The Knights extended their home winning streak at Spectrum Stadium to 18 games, and also extended their NCAA Division I FBS record of scoring 30+ points to 31 games. The win marked UCF's 19th consecutive American Athletic Conference victory (including two conference championship game wins), dating back to the start of the 2017 season.

=== At Cincinnati ===
	1	2	3	4	Total
No. 18 Knights	3	13	0	8	24
Bearcats	0	10	10	7	27

Cincinnati defeated UCF on Friday night by the score of 27–24, snapping the Knights' streak of 19 consecutive conference game wins and 31 consecutive games scoring 30+ points. Quarterback Dillon Gabriel threw three interceptions (one returned for a touchdown), and was sacked three times in the loss.

UCF took a 16–10 lead into halftime, but had struggled in the first half. On their first drive, the Knights drove to the 7 yard line, but had to settle for a field goal. On their second drive, the Knights again drove inside the 10 yard line, but Cam Jefferies intercepted the ball at the 2 yard line after the intended receiver fell down. Later in the second quarter, a UCF fumble led to Cincinnati's first touchdown of the game.

The third quarter belonged to the Bearcats. Cincinnati received the ball to start the second half, and drove down for a field goal and a 16–13 score. The Bearcars defense shut down the Knights offense, three times forcing a 3-and-out, along with a pick six. Trailing 27–16 early in the fourth quarter, UCF drove to the Bearcats 14 yard line, but Gabriel's third interception of the night ended the drive without points. The Knights managed to score a swift touchdown with 3:11 left in regulation, but the ensuing onside kick failed. With 1:02 left in the game, the Bearcats lined up facing 4th down & inches near midfield. Cincinnati got the first down, and ran out the clock to win. UCF dropped out of the top 25 for the first time since week 4 of 2017.

=== East Carolina ===
	1	2	3	4	Total
Pirates	0	6	16	6	28
Knights	21	14	6	0	41

On homecoming, UCF jumped out to a 32-point lead, and held on for a 41–28 victory over East Carolina. Dillon Gabriel started at quarterback, but Darriel Mack Jr. also took snaps. Gabriel threw for a career-best 365 yards and two touchdown passes and ran for a touchdown, while Mack threw a 33-yard touchdown pass in the second quarter. The Knights took a 35–6 lead into halftime, forcing the Pirates to punt on five of their seven first half possessions.

In the second half, the Pirates rallied. UCF was held to a 3-and-out on their first possession of the third quarter. Andrew Osteen's punt was blocked and recovered for a Pirates touchdown. A sack and fumble suffered by Dillion Gabriel led to another Pirates touchdown, and the score deficit was trimmed to 35–22. Injuries had sidelined several UCF players, but late in the third quarter Gabriel connected with Tre Nixon for a 53-yard touchdown pass and a more comfortable 41–22 Knights lead. The rally by East Carolina stalled, as driving to the UCF 35 yard line, Trace Christian fumbled and it was recovered by the Knights. Early in the fourth quarter, East Carolina drove to the UCF 23, but Holton Ahlers' pass was intercepted by Antwan Collier at the 9 yard line.

UCF kept alive their home winning streak at Spectrum Stadium, extending it to a school record 19 consecutive games.

=== At Temple ===
	1	2	3	4	Total
Knights	14	14	28	7	63
Owls	7	14	0	0	21

The UCF offense rushed for 385 yards and five rushing touchdowns as the Knights rolled over Temple by the final score of 63–21. Dillon Gabriel started at quarterback, and threw for 218 yards and three touchdown passes. Darriel Mack Jr. also saw time at quarterback, finishing with one touchdown run and one touchdown pass.

Both teams scored on their opening drives. With the score 7–7, the Knights pinned the Owls at their own 4 yard line. After going three-and-out, the Owls punted and the Knights took over at the Temple 48 yard line. On the first play of the next drive, Adrian Killins Jr. weaved through the defense for a 48-yard touchdown run, and a lead UCF would not surrender. In the second quarter, the Owls managed to pin the Knights back at their own 1 yard line, but in only six plays, the Knights marched 99 yards for a touchdown and a 21–7 lead. The game went into halftime with the Knights leading 28–21.

After a seemingly back-and-forth game in the first half, the Knights dominated the second half. UCF scored four touchdowns in the third quarter to build a 56–21 lead. The Knights intercepted quarterback Anthony Russo twice, and forced a turnover on downs. UCF added another touchdown in the fourth quarter, and held Temple to only two plays from scrimmage in Knights territory in the second half.

The 63 points was the most scored by the Knights in a road victory since a 64–30 win at Louisiana Tech in 1998. The team also became bowl-eligible with their sixth win of the season.

=== Houston ===
	1	2	3	4	Total
Cougars	17	6	0	6	29
Knights	14	7	21	2	44

Quarterback Dillon Gabriel threw for 298 yards, three touchdowns, and ran for another touchdown, as UCF rallied in the second half to beat Houston 44–29. The Cougars took a 23–21 halftime lead behind two touchdown runs by Mulbah Car, and three field goals by Dalton Witherspoon. Houston had racked up 349 yards of offense in the first half.

The second half belonged to the Knights. UCF scored touchdowns on three consecutive drives in the third quarter, making the score 42–23. Bentavious Thompson ran for two touchdowns, and Tre Nixon scored a 34-yard touchdown pass. The Cougars went three-and-out on four of their first five second-half possessions, then turned the ball over on downs and lost a fumble. After the strong first half, the Cougars were held to -4 yards in the third quarter.

The victory was UCF's 20th consecutive home victory at Spectrum Stadium, extending their school record.

=== At Tulsa ===
	1	2	3	4	Total
Knights	14	14	3	0	31
Golden Hurricane	7	10	7	10	34

Tulsa handed UCF their third loss of the season, and second conference loss, on chilly Friday night. Quarterback Dillon Gabriel threw two interceptions, and the Knights as a team committed 15 penalties for 120 yards in the loss. UCF controlled the game in the first half, leading 28–17 at halftime, but went cold in the second half, managing only 3 points.

Otis Anderson Jr. had two touchdowns (one rushing, one receiving), and Adrian Killins Jr. had a 57-yard touchdown run in the first half. Trailing 34–31 late in the fourth quarter, the Knights drove to the Tulsa 47 yard line, but turned the ball over on downs with 1:27 remaining in regulation. The Knights defense held Tulsa on three straight plays, and Tulsa faced a 4th & 1 at the 44 yard line with 1:04 to go. The Knights defense stuffed the play, but were penalized for 12 men on the field. Tulsa got a first down and ran out the clock to win.

=== At Tulane ===
	1	2	3	4	Total
Knights	10	7	14	3	34
Green Wave	0	7	10	14	31

The Knights jumped out to a 17-point lead, and held on for a 34–31 victory at Tulane. Quarterback Dillon Gabriel threw one touchdown pass in the first quarter, followed by a 44-yard touchdown run by Otis Anderson Jr. The Knights led 17–7 at halftime. On their first possession of the third quarter, UCF drove 70 yards in twelve plays, capped off by a 1-yard touchdown run by Darriel Mack Jr. Leading 24–7, the ensuing kickoff was returned 98 yards by Stephon Huderson for a Tulane touchdown. The Green Wave later tacked on a field goal to trim the score to 24–17.

Late in the third quarter, the Knights faced a 4th & Goal at the Tulane 2 yard line. The Knights went for it on fourth down. Mack rolled to his right, and was nearly sacked. He was able to dump off a pass to Anthony Robertson at the 2 yard line, who turned and fell into the endzone for the touchdown. After a Dylan Barnas field goal, Tulane managed to score two touchdowns in the final eight minutes. With the score 34–31 with 26 second left in regulation, Tulane attempted an onside kick. It appeared at first that Tulane may have recovered the onside kick, but after review, it was determined the ball had touched kicker Merek Glover before it had gone ten yards. Tulane was penalized for Illegal Touching, and UCF took over and ran out the clock to secure the win.

The victory kept UCF alive for the American Athletic Conference east division. But later in the day Cincinnati's victory over Temple clinched the east division for the Bearcats.

=== South Florida ===
	1	2	3	4	Total
Bulls	0	0	7	0	7
Knights	7	17	7	3	34

The Knights concluded the regular season with a dominating victory of rival South Florida. The Knights won the game 34–7, their third consecutive victory in the "War on I-4" rivalry. The Knights finished the regular season with a record of 9–3 overall, and 6–2 in The American. UCF also finished undefeated at home for the third straight season, extending their school record home winning streak to 21 games.

The Knights took the opening kickoff and drove 65 yards in twelve plays, including four third-down conversions. Gabe Davis made a leaping catch near the back of the endzone from Dillon Gabriel for the game's first touchdown. Early in the second quarter, Adrian Killins Jr. blasted for a 35-yard touchdown run to put UCF up 14–0. Gabriel and Davis connected for a second touchdown pass and a 21–0 lead. With under a minute remaining in the half, tempers flared as four players - two on each team - received unsportsmanlike conduct penalties. As Killins was being tackled, he grabbed the facemask of USF defensive back Nick Roberts, triggering a big scuffle. The incident came after another pregame skirmish during warm-ups. Officials quickly broke things up, and a few moments later, Dylan Barnas kicked a 50-yard field goal. UCF led 24–0 at halftime.

Darriel Mack Jr. took snaps at quarterback in the second half, scoring on a 2-yard touchdown run in the third quarter. Trailing 34–7, the Bulls drove into Knights territory midway through the fourth quarter. With 5:10 remaining in regulation, facing 4th & Goal at the UCF 3 yard line, Bulls quarterback Jordan McCloud was intercepted by Eriq Gilyard at the 5 yard line. UCF ran out the clock and secured the victory.

=== Marshall (Gasparilla Bowl) ===
	1	2	3	4	Total
Knights	21	3	21	3	48
Thundering Herd	0	7	18	0	25

UCF faced former MAC and later C-USA rival Marshall in the Gasparilla Bowl. This was both the Knights' and the Thundering Heard's fourth respective appearances in the Gasparilla Bowl game (formerly known as the St. Petersburg Bowl). On a rainy afternoon, the Knights soundly defeated Marshall by the score of 48–25, with big plays on defense, and a strong performance by starting quarterback, and game MVP, Dillon Gabriel.

Marshall received the opening kickoff, but on the third play of the game, quarterback Isiah Green's pass was tipped then fell into the hands of Richie Grant, who returned the ball 39 yards for a UCF touchdown. On Marshall's next drive, Green completed a pass to Armani Levias, who ran 45 yards, but had the ball punched out. UCF recovered the fumble at the 29 yard line, but were unable to score points. Later in the first quarter, Greg McRae broke free for a 26-yard touchdown run, and a 14–0 lead. With 7 minutes left in the first quarter, an intended lateral by Green to Talik Keaton was tipped and knocked loose by Knights defender Tre-Mon Morris Brash. He scooped up the ball and ran it back 45 yards for another UCF touchdown and a 21–0 lead.

After the explosive first quarter by the Knights defense, the Thundering Herd got on the board with defensive score in the second quarter. With Darriel Mack Jr. in at quarterback, an apparent UCF touchdown run by Bentavious Thompson was called back due to a holding penalty. On the following play, Mack's pass was intercepted by Micah Abraham, who stepped in front of the intended receiver, and ran it back 75 yards for a touchdown. UCF tacked on a field goal as time expired in the second half, and led 24–7 at halftime.

With weather clearing, Dillon Gabriel scored three touchdowns in the second half; two touchdown passes and one touchdown run. The Knights stretched out to a 48–25 lead, as the offense ultimately put up 578 total yards of offense. Senior linebacker Nate Evans, in his final game as a Knight, substituted in as a running back in the final minute. Evans took a hand off and dove for the endzone, but was tackled inches short of the goal line for what would have been his first and only offensive touchdown.

== Personnel ==
=== Coaching staff ===
Name	Position	Alma mater	Year Entering
Josh Heupel	Head Coach	Oklahoma	2nd
Glen Elarbee	Assistant Head Coach for Offense/Offensive Line	Middle Tennessee St.	2nd
Willie Martinez	Assistant Head Coach/Secondary	Miami (FL)	2nd
Jeff Lebby	Offensive coordinator/Quarterback	Oklahoma	2nd
Randy Shannon	Defensive coordinator/Linebackers	Miami (FL)	2nd
Anthony Tucker	Passing Game Coordinator/Running backs	Fresno State	2nd
Nick Toth	Special Teams Coordinator	Ohio	2nd
Darrell Wyatt	Wide Receivers	Kansas State	2nd
Corey Bell	Cornerbacks	South Carolina	2nd
Shane Burnham	Defensive Line	South Carolina	2nd
Joey Halzle	Offensive Assistant/Assistant Quarterbacks	Oklahoma	1st

== Awards and milestones ==
=== School records ===
- Most consecutive home game victories: 21
- Most consecutive games scoring 30+ points: 31 (also an NCAA Division I FBS record since the poll era began in 1936)
- Most consecutive regular season victories: 25
- Most consecutive away game victories (not including neutral site games): 10
- Most consecutive American Athletic Conference game victories: 19
- Most victories by a senior class: 41
- Most consecutive games scoring both a rushing touchdown and a passing touchdown: 48 (ongoing)

=== American Athletic Conference honors ===
==== Offensive Player of the Week ====
- September 16: Dillon Gabriel

==== American Athletic Conference All-Conference - First team ====
- WR Gabe Davis
- OT Jake Brown
- S Richie Grant

==== American Athletic Conference All-Conference - Second team ====
- OG Cole Schneider
- RB Adrian Killins
- DL Brendon Hayes
- LB Nate Evans
- CB Aaron Robinson

==== American Athletic Conference All-Conference - Honorable Mention ====
- RB Otis Anderson Jr.
- CB Nevelle Clarke
- WR Tre Nixon
- DL Kenny Turnier

=== National awards and honors ===
- Walter Camp Award FBS Offensive Player of the Week (Week 3) — Dillon Gabriel
- Pro Football Focus Third-team All-American – Gabe Davis
- Pro Football Focus Honorable Mention – Aaron Robinson

== Players drafted into the NFL ==
Round	Pick	Player	Position	NFL Club
4	128	Gabe Davis	WR	Buffalo Bills
