= Cincinnati–UCF football rivalry =

American college sports rivalry

- Cincinnati Bearcats UCF Knights
- Sport: Football
- First meeting: October 31, 2015; Cincinnati 52, UCF 7
- Latest meeting: October 10, 2025; Cincinnati 20, UCF 11
- Next meeting: TBD, 2027

Statistics
- Total meetings: 11
- All-time series: Cincinnati, 6–5
- Largest victory: Cincinnati, 52–7 (2015)
- Longest win streak: Cincinnati, 3 (2019–2021); UCF, 3 (2016–2018)
- Current win streak: Cincinnati, 2 (2024–present)

Locations of Cincinnati and UCF

The Cincinnati–UCF football rivalry is an American college football rivalry between the University of Cincinnati Bearcats and University of Central Florida Knights. The rivalry dates to the first game between the teams in 2015.

The schools have played in the same conference since 2013 when both joined the American Athletic Conference, and has continued after both schools began play in the Big 12 Conference in 2023. However the game is not a protected matchup in the Big 12, so there will be seasons with no scheduled game.

== History ==
In 2017, UCF was ranked No. 25th in the nation. McKenzie Milton blew up the Bearcats’ defense for 374 yards and five touchdowns through the first three quarters before torrential rain pounded Nippert Stadium, sending the teams to the locker room. The game was called after an hour and seven-minute delay and UCF was awarded the victory.

In 2018, the Knights remained undefeated. UCF was ranked No. 11th overall in the Nation. National spotlight was on the game as the No. 19 Bearcats headed to Orlando for a prime time match up as ESPN College GameDay broadcast from UCF’s campus. UCF played in front of a sold-out crowd in the Bounce House. UCF went on to win 38–13, vaulting them to No. 8 in the nation and eventually winning the conference championship against Memphis. The season concluded with UCF defeating Auburn in the Peach Bowl and being selected by the Colley Matrix as the 2017 national champions.

Cincinnati quarterback Desmond Ridder stated "That game not only set me up for the future but being able to lead everyone else on the team and know there's going to be tough environments and tough situations that we’re going to play in but to stay calm and stay under control is the biggest things in those moments."

In 2019, the Bearcats hung on for a 27–24 home victory against No. 18 UCF. This helped Cincinnati to a No. 17 ranking the following week.

In 2020, Cincinnati was now undefeated since 2020 Birmingham Bowl, ranking them 7th in the country. The Bearcats ultimately came from behind and won 36–33 against the Knights.

In 2021, Cincinnati came in the game against UCF ranked No. 3 in the AP Poll. In the end the Bearcats would defeat UCF 56-21. Cincinnati that season finished as the nation's only undefeated team in the regular season, and as the No. 4 seed in the College Football Playoff.

In 2023, the first-ever Big 12 matchup, UCF defeated Cincinnati 28–26 through a game-winning onside kick. The victory marked UCF's first Big 12 win and snapped a five-game skid for the Knights in the rivalry.

== Game results ==
Cincinnati victories	UCF victories

No.	Date	Location	Winner	Score
1	October 31, 2015	Cincinnati, OH	Cincinnati	52–7
2	November 12, 2016	Orlando, FL	UCF	24–3
3	October 7, 2017^{α}	Cincinnati, OH	No. 25 UCF	51–23
4	November 17, 2018	Orlando, FL	No. 11 UCF	38–13
5	October 4, 2019	Cincinnati, OH	Cincinnati	27–24
6	November 21, 2020	Orlando, FL	No. 7 Cincinnati	36–33
7	October 16, 2021	Cincinnati, OH	No. 3 Cincinnati	56–21
8	October 29, 2022	Orlando, FL	UCF	25–21
9	November 4, 2023	Cincinnati, OH	UCF	28–26
10	October 12, 2024	Orlando, FL	Cincinnati	19–13
11	October 11, 2025	Cincinnati, OH	Cincinnati	20–11
Series: Cincinnati leads 6–5

^α Game ended after 3rd quarter due to weather

== See also ==
- List of NCAA college football rivalry games
