= Desmond Ridder =

American football player (born 1999)

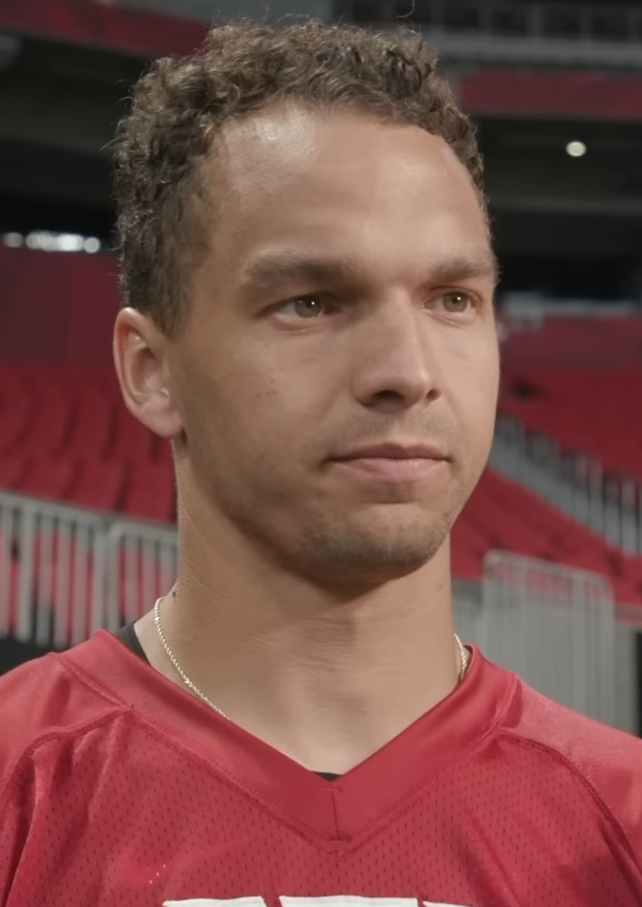
- Ridder with the Atlanta Falcons in 2023

Profile
- Position: Quarterback

Personal information
- Born: August 31, 1999 (age 27); Louisville, Kentucky, U.S.
- Listed height: 6 ft 3 in (1.91 m)
- Listed weight: 211 lb (96 kg)

Career information
- High school: St. Xavier (Louisville)
- College: Cincinnati (2017–2021)
- NFL draft: 2022: 3rd round, 74th overall pick

Career history
- Atlanta Falcons (2022–2023); Arizona Cardinals (2024)*; Las Vegas Raiders (2024); Cincinnati Bengals (2025)*; Minnesota Vikings (2025); Green Bay Packers (2025)
- * Offseason or practice squad member only

Awards and highlights
- 2× AAC Offensive Player of the Year (2020, 2021); AAC Rookie of the Year (2018); 2× first-team All-AAC (2020, 2021); American Athletic Conference Football Championship Game MVP (2020)

Career NFL statistics as of 2025
- Passing attempts: 588
- Passing completions: 374
- Completion percentage: 63.6%
- TD–INT: 16–14
- Passing yards: 4,002
- Passer rating: 82.6
- Stats at Pro Football Reference

Desmond Kelly Ridder (born August 31, 1999) is an American professional football quarterback. He played college football for the Cincinnati Bearcats, earning AAC Offensive Player of the Year honors twice before being selected by the Atlanta Falcons in the third round of the 2022 NFL draft.

== Early life ==
Ridder was born in Louisville, Kentucky, to a 15-year-old mother and was raised by his mother and grandmother. He attended Holy Family Parochial before attending St. Xavier High School.

As a senior at St. Xavier, Ridder passed for 1,319 yards and nine touchdowns and also led the Tigers in rushing with 668 yards and 12 touchdowns and was named All-Metro. He was rated as a two-star recruit by Rivals.com and a three-star recruit by 24/7 Sports and committed to play college football at the University of Cincinnati over an offer from Eastern Kentucky. He received his scholarship offer from Cincinnati head coach Tommy Tuberville following a tryout held on the morning of the Kentucky Oaks for offensive coordinator Zac Taylor during his junior year. After Tuberville resigned during his senior year, new coach Luke Fickell honored the offer and Ridder signed his National Letter of Intent.

== College career ==
Ridder redshirted his true freshman season in 2017. He became the Bearcats' starting quarterback as a redshirt freshman in 2018 and passed for 2,445 yards and 20 touchdowns and gained 583 yards rushing along with five touchdowns and was named the American Athletic Conference (AAC) Rookie of the Year.

As a redshirt sophomore in 2019, Ridder completed 179 of 325 passes for 2,164 yards and 18 touchdowns against nine interceptions while also rushing for 650 yards and five touchdowns. He was named the MVP of the 2020 Birmingham Bowl completing 14-of-24 passes for 95 yards and one touchdown, while also rushing for 105 yards and three touchdowns in a 38–6 victory over Boston College.

The 2020 season proved to be a breakout campaign for the junior quarterback. Ridder was named the Walter Camp Offensive Player of the Week and the Davey O'Brien National Quarterback of the Week after completing 13-of-21 passes for 126 yards and a touchdown and also rushing eight times for 179 yards and three touchdowns in a 42–13 win over 16th-ranked SMU on October 24, 2020. At the conclusion of the regular season, Ridder was named the AAC Offensive Player of the Year after passing 2,296 yards, and 19 touchdowns with six interceptions, while also rushing for 592 yards and 12 touchdowns, in only nine games due to the COVID-19-shortened season. Ridder considered declaring for the 2021 NFL draft, but opted to return for his redshirt senior season.

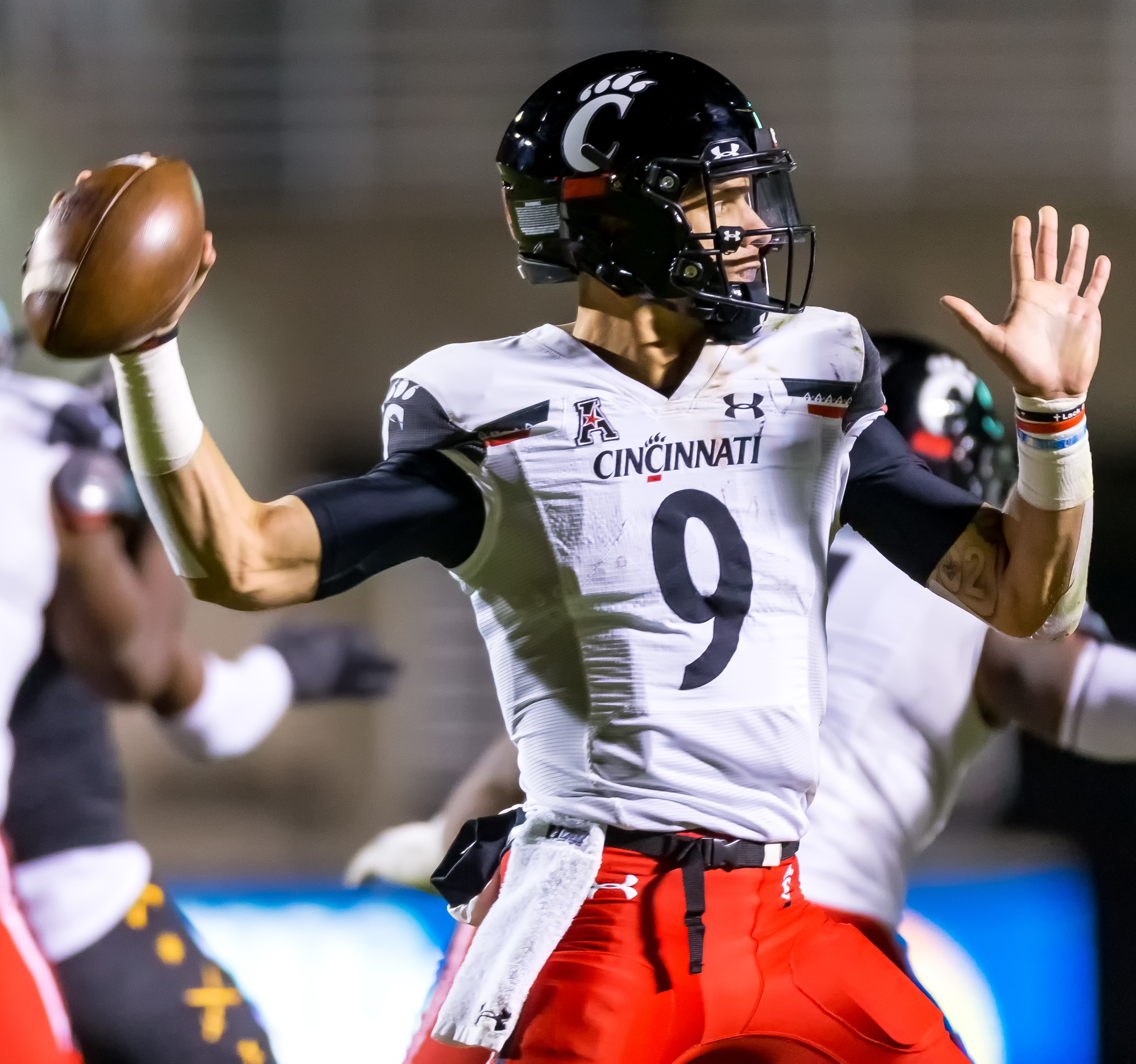
Ridder with the Cincinnati Bearcats in 2021

In 2021, for the second time in his career, Ridder was named the Davey O'Brien National Quarterback of the Week after the No. 7 Bearcats defeated No. 9 Notre Dame on the road. Ridder went 19-of-32 for 297 yards and two TDs. In addition, he rushed for 26 yards and a game-sealing fourth-quarter touchdown as the Bearcats snapped the Fighting Irish's 26-game home winning streak. Following an unbeaten 12–0 season, Ridder and the Bearcats went into the 2021 American Athletic Conference Football Championship Game ranked number four in the AP Polls, meaning a victory would see them stay in a playoff spot. Following a 35–20 win over the Houston Cougars, they became the first Group of Five team to make the playoffs, as well as the last major undefeated team going into the postseason. Ridder and Cincinnati would fall 27–6 to the Alabama Crimson Tide in the college football playoff semi-finals, finishing his final year in college with 30 passing touchdowns, six rushing touchdowns, and just eight interceptions, in what was the best season in the program's history.

== Professional career ==
=== Pre-draft ===
After wrapping up his collegiate career at Cincinnati, Ridder was invited to the NFL Scouting Combine, where he measured in at 6'3" and 211 lbs., with a 32.75-inch arm span and a 10-inch hand span. With a 4.52-second 40-yard dash, Ridder posted one of the fastest times recorded by a quarterback. At the end of the pre-draft process, most experts had projected Ridder as a first-round to third-round pick. He was rated as the fourth-best quarterback prospect in the 2022 NFL draft class, after Malik Willis, Kenny Pickett, and Matt Corral.

Pre-draft measurables
Height	Weight	Arm length	Hand span	Wingspan	40-yard dash	10-yard split	20-yard split	20-yard shuttle	Three-cone drill	Vertical jump	Broad jump	Wonderlic
6 ft 3 3/8 in (1.91 m)	211 lb (96 kg)	32 3/4 in (0.83 m)	10 in (0.25 m)	6 ft 7 in (2.01 m)	4.52 s	1.54 s	2.59 s	4.29 s	7.15 s	36.0 in (0.91 m)	10 ft 7 in (3.23 m)	19
All values from NFL Combine

=== Atlanta Falcons ===
==== 2022 season ====
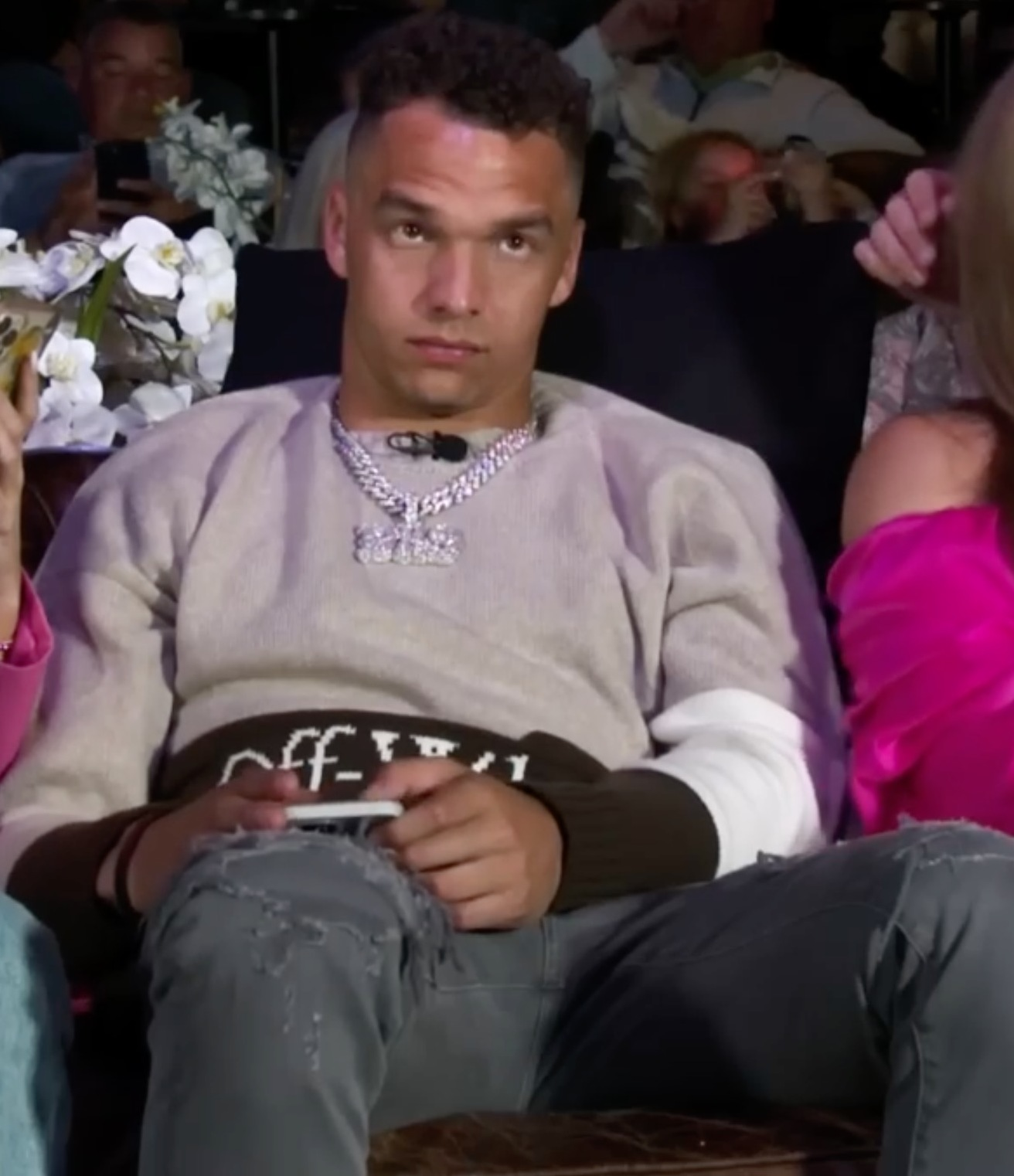
Ridder during the 2022 NFL draft

Ridder was selected in the third round (74th overall) of the 2022 NFL draft by the Atlanta Falcons. He was considered a surprise fall in the draft, as many analysts had projected him to be selected in the first round as high as the eighth overall pick. He was only the second quarterback to be selected in the draft, after Kenny Pickett was selected in the first round by the Pittsburgh Steelers.

In his first training camp in the NFL, Ridder competed for the starting quarterback job against veteran Marcus Mariota. On July 28, 2022, Falcons' head coach Arthur Smith named Mariota as the starting quarterback to open the season, with Ridder serving as the backup.

On December 8, with an impending Bye week following after a 5–8 record for the season, the Falcons benched Mariota and named Ridder as the starting quarterback for the rest of the season. Ridder made his NFL debut in Week 15 against the New Orleans Saints, where he went 13-of-26 for 97 yards, zero touchdowns, zero interceptions, and 38 rushing yards in the 18–21 loss. In Week 17 against the Arizona Cardinals, Ridder was 19-of-26 for 169 yards in the 20–19 victory, his first career NFL win. In Week 18 against the Tampa Bay Buccaneers, Ridder was 19-for-30 for 224 yards and two touchdowns in the 30–17 win.

Ridder finished his rookie season with 708 passing yards, two touchdowns, zero interceptions, an 86.4 passer rating, and 64 rushing yards.

==== 2023 season ====
In March 2023, Falcons' HC Arthur Smith announced that Ridder would remain the starting quarterback at the start of the 2023 season.

In Week 8, after going 3–14 against the Tennessee Titans in the first half, Ridder was benched at the start of the second half, being replaced by Taylor Heinicke. In Week 9, Smith downgraded him on the depth chart and named Heinicke as the Falcons' starting quarterback against the Minnesota Vikings. In Week 12, Ridder was renamed the starter after Heinicke went 0–2 in close losses to the Vikings and the Arizona Cardinals. He finished the 2023 season with 2,836 passing yards, 12 passing touchdowns, and 12 interceptions, to go with 53 carries for 193 rushing yards and five rushing touchdowns.

=== Arizona Cardinals ===
On March 14, 2024, Ridder was traded to the Arizona Cardinals in exchange for wide receiver Rondale Moore. The Falcons signed Kirk Cousins the day prior. On August 27, Ridder lost the battle for backup quarterback against Clayton Tune, being released by the Cardinals as part of final roster cuts, and re-signed to their practice squad the following day.

=== Las Vegas Raiders ===
On October 21, 2024, Ridder was signed off the Cardinals' practice squad to the Las Vegas Raiders after quarterback Aidan O'Connell was placed on injured reserve. He would serve as backup to Gardner Minshew.

In Week 9, Ridder would come in for Minshew against the Cincinnati Bengals as the Raiders were down 31–10 in the third quarter. He completed 11-of-16 pass attempts for 74 yards, with a touchdown and a lost fumble. In Week 12 against the Denver Broncos, Ridder came in after a season-ending collarbone injury to Minshew. However, O'Connell was taken off IR and named starter for Week 13 against the Kansas City Chiefs. In Week 14 against the Tampa Bay Buccaneers, Ridder would see play in the fourth quarter after O'Connell was injured late in the third quarter. He went 12-of-18 for 101 yards with zero touchdowns and zero interceptions. Ridder was named starter in Week 15 against his former Falcons, which ended in a 9–15 loss. In Week 18 against the Los Angeles Chargers, O'Connell was briefly injured after a sack in the fourth quarter and Ridder saw three snaps.

=== Cincinnati Bengals ===
On July 20, 2025, Ridder was signed by the Cincinnati Bengals ahead of training camp. On August 26, he was waived by the Bengals as part of final roster cuts.

=== Minnesota Vikings ===
On September 16, 2025, the Minnesota Vikings signed Ridder following an injury to J. J. McCarthy. He was waived by the Vikings on October 4. On November 27, Ridder was re-signed to the practice squad after McCarthy was placed in concussion protocol. He was released by the Vikings on December 2.

=== Green Bay Packers ===
On December 31, 2025, the Green Bay Packers signed Ridder to their practice squad. He was promoted to the active roster on January 6, 2026. On May 4, Ridder was released by the Packers.

== Career statistics ==
=== NFL ===
Legend
Led the league

Year	Team	Games			Passing									Rushing					Sacked		Fumbles	
Year	Team	GP	GS	Record	Cmp	Att	Pct	Yds	Y/A	Lng	TD	Int	Rtg	Att	Yds	Y/A	Lng	TD	Sck	Yds	Fum	Lost
2022	ATL	4	4	2–2	73	115	63.5	708	6.2	40	2	0	86.4	16	64	4.0	18	0	9	33	3	2
2023	ATL	15	13	6–7	249	388	64.2	2,836	7.3	71	12	12	83.4	53	193	3.6	23	5	31	197	12	7
2024	LV	6	1	0–1	52	85	61.2	458	5.4	28	2	2	73.6	9	36	4.0	11	0	10	64	3	2
2025	MIN	0	0	—	DNP																	
Career		25	18	8–10	374	588	63.6	4,002	6.8	71	16	14	82.6	78	293	3.8	23	5	50	294	18	11

=== College ===
Season	Team	Games			Passing								Rushing			
Season	Team	GP	GS	Record	Cmp	Att	Pct	Yds	Avg	TD	Int	Rtg	Att	Yds	Avg	TD
2017	Cincinnati	(redshirt) Redshirted														
2018	Cincinnati	13	11	9–2	194	311	62.4	2,445	7.9	20	5	146.4	150	572	3.8	5
2019	Cincinnati	13	13	11–2	179	325	55.1	2,164	6.7	18	9	123.7	144	650	4.5	5
2020	Cincinnati	10	10	9–1	186	281	66.2	2,296	8.2	19	6	152.9	98	592	6.0	12
2021	Cincinnati	14	14	13–1	251	387	64.9	3,334	8.6	30	8	158.7	110	355	3.2	6
Career		50	48	42–6	810	1,304	62.1	10,239	7.9	87	28	145.8	501	2,180	4.4	28

== Personal life ==
Ridder married his high school sweetheart, Claire Cornett, on July 15, 2022, and they have two children.
