= 2019 Tulane Green Wave football team =

American college football season

2019 Tulane Green Wave football

Armed Forces Bowl champion

Armed Forces Bowl, W 30–13 vs. Southern Miss
- Conference: American Athletic Conference
- West Division
- Record: 7–6 (3–5 The American)
- Head coach: Willie Fritz (4th season)
- Offensive coordinator: Will Hall (1st season)
- Offensive scheme: Multiple
- Defensive coordinator: Jack Curtis (4th season)
- Base defense: 4–2–5
- Home stadium: Yulman Stadium

2019 American Athletic Conference football standings
	Conf.			Overall
Team	W		L	W		L
East Division
No. 21 Cincinnati xy	7	–	1	11	–	3
No. 24 UCF	6	–	2	10	–	3
Temple	5	–	3	8	–	5
South Florida	2	–	6	4	–	8
East Carolina	1	–	7	4	–	8
UConn	0	–	8	2	–	10
West Division
No. 17 Memphis xy$	7	–	1	12	–	2
No. 20 Navy x	7	–	1	11	–	2
SMU	6	–	2	10	–	3
Tulane	3	–	5	7	–	6
Houston	2	–	6	4	–	8
Tulsa	2	–	6	4	–	8
Championship: Memphis 29, Cincinnati 24
$ – Conference champion; x – Division champion/co-champions; y – Championship game participant; Rankings from AP Poll

The 2019 Tulane Green Wave football team represented Tulane University in the 2019 NCAA Division I FBS football season. The Green Wave played their home games at Yulman Stadium in New Orleans, Louisiana, and competed in the West Division of the American Athletic Conference. They were led by fourth-year head coach Willie Fritz.

== Preseason ==
=== Award watch lists ===
Listed in the order that they were released

Award	Player	Position	Year
Chuck Bednarik Award	Patrick Johnson	DE	JR
Doak Walker Award	Darius Bradwell	RB	SR
Fred Biletnikoff Award	Darnell Mooney	WR	SR
Rimington Trophy	Christian Montano	C	GRAD
Bronko Nagurski Trophy	Patrick Johnson	DE	JR
Patrick Mannelly Award	Geron Eatherly	LS	SR
Johnny Unitas Golden Arm Award	Justin McMillan	QB	GRAD

=== AAC media poll ===
The preseason poll was released at the 2019 AAC Media Day on July 16, 2019. The Green Wave were predicted to finish in third place in the AAC West Division.

== Schedule ==
Date	Time	Opponent	Site	TV	Result	Attendance
August 29, 2019	7:00 p.m.	FIU*	Yulman Stadium; New Orleans, LA	ESPN3	W 42–14	16,361
September 7	6:30 p.m.	at No. 10 Auburn*	Jordan–Hare Stadium; Auburn, AL (rivalry)	ESPN2	L 6–24	85,317
September 14	7:00 p.m.	Missouri State*	Yulman Stadium; New Orleans, LA	ESPN3	W 58–6	18,746
September 19	7:00 p.m.	Houston	Yulman Stadium; New Orleans, LA	ESPN	W 38–31	21,032
October 5	11:00 a.m.	at Army*	Michie Stadium; West Point, NY	CBSSN	W 42–33	38,019
October 12	2:45 p.m.	UConn	Yulman Stadium; New Orleans, LA	ESPNU	W 49–7	17,040
October 19	6:00 p.m.	at Memphis	Liberty Bowl Memorial Stadium; Memphis, TN	ESPN2	L 17–47	30,221
October 26	2:30 p.m.	at Navy	Navy–Marine Corps Memorial Stadium; Annapolis, MD	CBSSN	L 38–41	31,118
November 2	2:30 p.m.	Tulsa^{†}	Yulman Stadium; New Orleans, LA	ESPN2	W 38–26	27,417
November 16	11:00 a.m.	at Temple	Lincoln Financial Field; Philadelphia, PA	ESPNU	L 21–29	27,850
November 23	11:00 a.m.	UCF	Yulman Stadium; New Orleans, LA	CBSSN	L 31–34	21,032
November 30	3:00 p.m.	at SMU	Gerald J. Ford Stadium; Dallas, TX	ESPNU	L 20–37	20,761
January 4, 2020	10:30 a.m.	vs. Southern Miss*	Amon G. Carter Stadium; Fort Worth, TX (Armed Forces Bowl, Battle for the Bell)	ESPN	W 30–13	38,513
*Non-conference game; ^{†}Homecoming; Rankings from AP Poll and College Football Playoff Rankings after November 5 released prior to game; All times are in Central time

== Roster ==
2019 Tulane Green Wave football team roster
Players
Coaches
Offense

Pos.	#	Name	Class
WR	1	Jalen McCleskey	Sr
WR	3	Darnell Mooney	Sr
WR	4	Jha'Quan Jackson	Fr
RB	5	Stephon Huderson	Jr
RB	6	Corey Dauphine	Sr
QB	8	Josh Coltrin	Fr
QB	9	Keon Howard	Jr
RB	10	Darius Bradwell	Sr
RB	11	Amare Jones	So
QB	12	Justin McMillan	Sr
QB	14	Christian Daniels	Fr
WR	15	Jacob Robertson Jr.	Jr
QB	16	P.J. Hurst	Jr
WR	17	Jorien Vallien	So
QB	19	Josh Holl	Fr
RB	20	Cameron Carroll	Fr
RB	22	Tyjae Spears	Fr
RB	27	Ygenio Booker	Fr
WR	30	Logan Ammons	So
TE	40	Connor Prouet	So
RB	45	James Poche	Fr
WR	47	Andrew Zuckerman	Jr
WR	48	Nick Toppino	Fr
OL	50	Tyler Johnson	Sr
OL	51	Stephen Lewerenz	Fr
OL	52	Sincere Haynesworth	Fr
OL	53	Keyshawn McLeod	Sr
OL	58	Christian Montano	Sr
OL	61	Colby Orgeron	Fr
OL	63	Cameron Jackel	So
OL	64	Corey Dublin	Jr
OL	65	Ben Knutson	Sr
OL	66	Nik Hogan	Fr
OL	70	Timothy Shafter	So
OL	71	Ben Bratcher	Fr
OL	72	Caleb Thomas	Fr
OL	74	Jackson Fort	Fr
OL	76	Michael Remondet	Fr
OL	78	Trace Oldner	Fr
OL	79	Joey Claybrook	So
OL	80	Tyrick James	So
WR	81	Tyrek Presley	Fr
WR	82	Jaetavian Toles	Jr
WR	83	Dane Ledford	So
TE	84	Will Wallace	So
WR	85	Ryan Thompson	Fr
WR	86	Sorrell Brown	Fr
WR	87	Kevin LeDee	So
TE	88	Keshon Williams	Fr
WR	89	Conner Richardson	Fr

Defense

Pos.	#	Name	Class
S	2	P.J. Hall	Sr
DE	5	Cameron Sample	Jr
S	6	Larry Bryant	Sr
DE	7	Patrick Johnson	Jr
CB	8	Willie Langham	So
S	9	Jaylon Monroe	Jr
S	12	Ton'Quez Ball	Fr
DB	14	Jacquez Norman	Fr
DB	16	Levi Williams	Fr
DB	19	Kiland Harrison	Fr
DB	21	Chris Joyce	So
S	23	Tyler Judson	Fr
LB	24	Dorian Williams	Fr
S	25	Will Harper	Sr
CB	26	BoPete Keyes	Sr
LB	28	Marvin Moody Jr.	Jr
LB	29	Quentin Brown	So
S	30	Jonathan Mestayer II	Fr
S	31	Larry Brooks	So
S	32	Grant Hamel	Fr
S	33	Tirise Barge	Jr
S	34	Kanyon Walker	Fr
LB	35	Lawrence Graham	Sr
S	36	Chase Kuerschen	Jr
S	37	Macon Clark	So
LB	38	KJ Vault	So
S	39	Sean Harper	Jr
LB	40	Nick Anderson	So
LB	41	Darius Hodges	Fr
DE	42	Torri Singletary Jr.	So
DE	44	Juan Monjarres	So
LB	45	Malik Lawal	Sr
LB	46	Keitha Jones Jr.	So
NT	48	De'Andre Williams	Jr
LB	49	Armoni Dixon	Fr
DE	54	Carlos Hatcher	So
DL	55	Mike Hinton	Sr
LB	56	Nick Martorell	Fr
LB	59	Sam Bruchhaus	So
DL	73	Dane Ziegler	So
NT	77	Jeffery Johnson	So
DE	90	Davon Wright	So
DE	91	Noah Seiden	Fr
NT	93	Jamiran James	Fr
DL	94	Eric Hicks Jr.	Fr
DL	95	Jeremiah Hernandez	So
DE	98	Nick Kubiet	So
DE	99	Alfred Thomas	So

Special teams

Pos.	#	Name	Class
K, P	43	Coby Neenan	Jr
K	45	Randy Harvey	Sr
LS	57	Ethan Hudak	Fr
LS	60	Geron Eatherly	Sr
K	62	Merek Glover	Jr
LS	67	Matt Smith	Jr
K	92	Sterling Stockwell	Fr
K	96	Casey Glover	Fr
P	97	Ryan Wright	So

Head coach

- Willie Fritz (Pittsburg State)

Coordinators/assistant coaches

- Will Hall (North Alabama)
  Offensive coordinator
- Jack Curtis (Evangel)
  Defensive coordinator, safeties
- Jamaal Fobbs (Oklahoma State)
  Running backs
- Kevin Peoples (Carroll College)
  Defensive line
- Slade Nagle (McNeese State)
  Tight ends
- Michael Mutz (Colorado Mesa)
  Linebackers
- Chris Hampton (South Carolina)
  Defensive backs
- Jeff Conway (Northwest Missouri State)
  Wide receivers
- J. J. McCleskey (Tennessee)
  Secondary
- Cody Kennedy (Southeastern Louisiana)
  Offensive line

Legend

- (C) Team captain
- (S) Suspended
- (I) Ineligible
- Injured
- Redshirt

== Game summaries ==
=== FIU ===
Florida International at Tulane – Game summary

Quarter	1	2	3	4	Total
Panthers	0	7	7	0	14
Green Wave	7	21	14	0	42

at Yulman Stadium, New Orleans, LA

- Date: August 29
- Game time: 7:00 p.m. CDT
- Game weather: 89 °F (32 °C); clear, fair
- Game attendance: 16,361
- Referee: Jonathan Noll
- TV: ESPN3

Game information

First quarter

- (05:34) TULN TD – Tyrick James 18-yard pass from Justin McMillan, Merek Glover kick
  Tulane 7–0; Drive: 7 plays, 70 yards, 3:25

Second quarter

- (14:54) TULN TD – Amare Jones 7-yard rush, Merek Glover kick
  Tulane 14–0; Drive: 8 plays, 59 yards, 3:03
- (10:05) TULN TD – Corey Dauphine 14-yard rush, Merek Glover kick
  Tulane 21–0; Drive: 7 plays, 80 yards, 2:58
- (03:50) FIU TD – Anthony Jones 1-yard rush, José Borregales kick
  Tulane 21–7; Drive: 13 plays, 75 yards, 6:15
- (00:28) TULN TD – Justin McMillan 17-yard rush, Merek Glover kick
  Tulane 28–7; Drive: 3 plays, 25 yards, 0:43

Third quarter

- (10:04) TULN TD – Darnell Mooney 42-yard pass from Justin McMillan, Merek Glover kick
  Tulane 35–7; Drive: 6 plays, 70 yards, 2:38
- (07:57) TULN TD – Corey Dauphine 50-yard rush, Merek Glover kick
  Tulane 42–7; Drive: 1 play, 50 yards, 0:12
- (04:44) FIU TD – Shemar Thornton 17-yard pass from James Morgan, José Borregales kick
  Tulane 42–14; Drive: 7 plays, 75 yards, 3:13

Top passers

- FIU – James Morgan – 19/34, 208 yards, TD, INT
- TULN – Justin McMillan – 14/18, 199 yards, 2 TD

Top rushers

- FIU – Anthony Jones – 14 carries, 48 yards, TD
- TULN – Darius Bradwell – 13 carries, 90 yards

Top receivers

- FIU – Sterling Palmer – 2 receptions, 49 yards
- TULN – Darnell Mooney – 4 receptions, 84 yards, TD

Statistics	FIU	Tulane
First downs	16	28
Total yards	267	545
Rushing yards	59	350
Passing yards	208	195
Turnovers	2	1
Time of possession	26:18	33:42

=== At Auburn ===
Tulane at Auburn – Game summary

Quarter	1	2	3	4	Total
Green Wave	3	3	0	0	6
No. 10 Tigers	0	14	7	3	24

at Jordan–Hare Stadium, Auburn, AL

- Date: September 7
- Game time: 6:30 p.m. CDT
- Game weather: Sunny • Temperature: 89 °F (32 °C) • Wind: NW 4 miles per hour (6.4 km/h)
- Game attendance: 85,317
- Referee: Lee Hendrick
- TV announcers (ESPN2): Jason Benetti (play-by-play), Rod Gilmore (analyst), Quint Kessenich (sideline reporter)

Game information

First quarter

- (10:13) TULN FG – Merek Glover 44-yard field goal
  Tulane 3–0; Drive: 9 plays, 48 yards, 3:17

Second quarter

- (12:54) AUB TD – Will Hastings 31-yard pass from Bo Nix, Anders Carlson kick
  Auburn 7–3; Drive: 5 plays, 66 yards, 1:48
- (09:37) AUB TD – Eli Stove 4-yard rush, Anders Carlson kick
  Auburn 14–3; Drive: 7 plays, 58 yards, 2:11
- (00:40) TULN FG – Merek Glover 32-yard field goal
  Auburn 14–6; Drive: 8 plays, 40 yards, 1:54

Third quarter

- (01:51) AUB TD – JaTarvious Whitlow 14-yard rush, Anders Carlson kick
  Auburn 21–6; Drive: 11 plays, 82 yards, 5:20

Fourth quarter

- (12:36) AUB FG – Anders Carlson 22-yard field goal
  Auburn 24–6; Drive: 10 plays, 59 yards, 3:44

Top passers

- TULN – Justin McMillan – 10/33, 103 yards, INT
- AUB – Bo Nix – 19/37, 207 yards, TD

Top rushers

- TULN – Justin McMillan – 7 carries, 54 yards
- AUB – JaTarvious Whitlow – 23 carries, 96 yards, TD

Top receivers

- TULN – Darnell Mooney – 3 receptions, 48 yards
- AUB – Will Hastings – 5 receptions, 75 yards, TD

Statistics	Tulane	Auburn
First downs	12	20
Total yards	223	379
Rushing yards	120	172
Passing yards	103	207
Turnovers	1	2
Time of possession	25:27	34:33

=== Missouri State ===
Missouri State at Tulane – Game summary

Quarter	1	2	3	4	Total
Bears	0	6	0	0	6
Green Wave	10	28	13	7	58

at Yulman Stadium, New Orleans, LA

- Date: September 14
- Game time: 7:00 p.m. CDT
- Game weather: 83 °F (28 °C); partly cloudy
- Game attendance: 18,746
- Referee: Mike Roche
- TV: ESPN3

Game information

First quarter

- (11:37) TULN FG – Merek Glover 23-yard field goal
  Tulane 3–0; Drive: 8 plays, 32 yards, 3:23
- (04:37) TULN TD – Amare Jones 3-yard rush, Merek Glover kick
  Tulane 10–0; Drive: 11 plays, 64 yards, 5:28

Second quarter

- (14:42) TULN TD – Amare Jones 57-yard rush, Merek Glover kick
  Tulane 17–0; Drive: 8 plays, 62 yards, 2:34
- (11:49) TULN TD – P. J. Hall 30-yard interception returned, Merek Glover kick
  Tulane 24–0; Drive: 3 plays, 0 yards, 0:54
- (09:51) MOST TD – D. J. Frost 11-yard pass from Peyton Huslig, Parker Lacina PAT blocked
  Tulane 24–6; Drive: 5 plays, 75 yards, 1:58
- (06:58) TULN TD – Justin McMillan 4-yard rush, Merek Glover kick
  Tulane 31–6; Drive: 8 plays, 66 yards, 2:47
- (02:02) TULN TD – Justin McMillan 1-yard rush, Merek Glover kick
  Tulane 38–6; Drive: 7 plays, 51 yards, 3:24

Third quarter

- (05:58) TULN TD – Tyjae Spears 68-yard pass from Keon Howard, Randy Harvey PAT failed
  Tulane 44–6; Drive: 1 play, 88 yards, 0:15
- (02:21) TULN TD – Ygenio Booker 3-yard rush, Randy Harvey kick
  Tulane 51–6; Drive: 3 plays, 13 yards, 1:10

Fourth quarter

- (03:15) TULN TD – Tyjae Spears 52-yard rush, Randy Harvey kick
  Tulane 58–6; Drive: 2 plays, 53 yards, 0:53

Top passers

- MOST – Peyton Huslig – 14/25, 128 yards, TD, 3 INT
- TULN – Justin McMillan – 13/16, 122 yards, INT

Top rushers

- MOST – Donovan Daniels – 11 carries, 29 yards
- TULN – Tyjae Spears – 8 carries, 89 yards, TD

Top receivers

- MOST – Donovan Daniels – 2 receptions, 46 yards
- TULN – Tyjae Spears – 1 reception, 88 yards, TD

Statistics	Missouri State	Tulane
First downs	11	26
Total yards	182	540
Rushing yards	54	298
Passing yards	128	242
Turnovers	3	1
Time of possession	26:43	33:17

=== Houston ===
Houston at Tulane – Game summary

Quarter	1	2	3	4	Total
Cougars	14	14	0	7	35
Green Wave	7	7	7	17	38

at Yulman Stadium, New Orleans, LA

- Date: September 19
- Game time: 7:00 p.m. CDT
- Game weather: 85 °F (29 °C); partly cloudy
- Game attendance: 21,032
- Referee: A. Calabrese
- TV: ESPN

Game information

First quarter

- (14:46) HOU TD – Marquez Stevenson 75-yard pass from D'Eriq King, Dalton Witherspoon kick
  Houston 7–0; Drive: 1 play, 75 yards, 0:14
- (07:24) TULN TD – Jalen McCleskey 38-yard pass from Justin McMillan, Merek Glover kick
  Tied 7–7; Drive: 5 plays, 48 yards, 2:08
- (03:25) HOU TD – Kyle Porter 1-yard rush, Dalton Witherspoon kick
  Houston 14–7; Drive: 10 plays, 75 yards, 3:59

Second quarter

- (14:35) HOU TD – Keith Corbin 28-yard pass from D'Eriq King, Dalton Witherspoon kick
  Houston 21–7; Drive: 3 plays, 75 yards, 0:40
- (13:16) HOU TD – D'Eriq King 35-yard rush, Dalton Witherspoon kick
  Houston 28–7; Drive: 3 plays, 35 yards, 0:20
- (10:11) TULN TD – Stephon Huderson 9-yard rush, Merek Glover kick
  Houston 28–14; Drive: 9 plays, 75 yards, 3:05

Third quarter

- (12:53) TULN TD – Darnell Mooney 48-yard pass from Justin McMillan, Merek Glover kick
  Houston 28–21; Drive: 5 plays, 59 yards, 2:07

Fourth quarter

- (14:22) TULN TD – Justin McMillan 15-yard rush, Merek Glover kick
  Tied 28–28; Drive: 10 plays, 93 yards, 4:19
- (06:10) TULN FG – Merek Glover 44-yard field goal
  Tulane 31–28; Drive: 10 plays, 42 yards, 4:22
- (00:21) HOU FG – Dalton Witherspoon 24-yard field goal
  Tied 31–31; Drive: 16 plays, 68 yards, 5:49
- (00:03) TULN TD – Jalen McCleskey 53-yard pass from Justin McMillan, Merek Glover kick
  Tulane 38–31; Drive: 2 plays, 71 yards, 0:18

Top passers

- HOU – D'Eriq King – 16/33, 229 yards, 2 TD, INT
- TULN – Justin McMillan – 7/20, 186 yards, 3 TD

Top rushers

- HOU – D'Eriq King – 17 carries, 116 yards, TD
- TULN – Darius Bradwell – 20 carries, 113 yards

Top receivers

- HOU – Marquez Stevenson – 2 receptions, 95 yards, TD
- TULN – Jalen McCleskey – 4 receptions, 120 yards, 2 TD

Statistics	Houston	Tulane
First downs	28	23
Total yards	533	511
Rushing yards	304	325
Passing yards	229	186
Turnovers	1	1
Time of possession	31:36	28:24

=== At Army ===
Tulane at Army – Game summary

Quarter	1	2	3	4	Total
Green Wave	14	7	7	14	42
Black Knights	7	7	7	12	33

at Michie Stadium, West Point, NY

- Date: October 5
- Game time: 11:00 a.m. CDT
- Game attendance: 38,019
- Referee: Duane Heydt
- TV: CBS Sports Network

Game information

First quarter

- (13:41) ARMY TD – Connor Slomka 2-yard rush, David Cooper kick
  Army 7–0; Drive: 2 plays, 38 yards, 0:38
- (10:53) TULN TD – Amare Jones 15-yard pass from Justin McMillan, Merek Glover kick
  Tied 7–7; Drive: 7 plays, 82 yards, 2:39
- (05:00) TULN TD – Corey Dauphine 30-yard rush, Merek Glover kick
  Tulane 14–7; Drive: 9 plays, 84 yards, 4:11

Second quarter

- (13:12) TULN TD – Justin McMillan 1-yard rush, Merek Glover kick
  Tulane 21–7; Drive: 7 plays, 90 yards, 2:52
- (04:26) ARMY TD – Kelvin Hopkins Jr. 1-yard rush, David Cooper kick
  Tulane 21–14; Drive: 15 plays, 77 yards, 8:39

Third quarter

- (11:31) ARMY TD – Kelvin Hopkins Jr. 4-yard rush, David Cooper kick
  Tied 21–21; Drive: 7 plays, 75 yards, 3:29
- (07:38) TULN TD – Darius Bradwell 13-yard rush, Merek Glover kick
  Tulane 28–21; Drive: 10 plays, 77 yards, 3:46

Fourth quarter

- (10:27) TULN TD – Amare Jones 1-yard rush, Merek Glover kick
  Tulane 35–21; Drive: 12 plays, 78 yards, 5:03
- (05:46) TULN TD – Cameron Carroll 41-yard rush, Merek Glover kick
  Tulane 42–21; Drive: 5 plays, 68 yards, 2:54
- (02:55) ARMY TD – Camden Harrison 11-yard pass from Kelvin Hopkins Jr., two-point conversion rush attempt failed
  Tulane 42–27; Drive: 6 plays, 73 yards, 0:44
- (02:36) ARMY TD – Jabari Moore 54-yard fumble returned, two-point conversion rush attempt failed
  Tulane 42–33; Drive: 2 plays, 0 yards, 0:18

Top passers

- TULN – Justin McMillan – 15/21, 201 yards, TD
- ARMY – Kelvin Hopkins Jr. – 9/24, 170 yards, TD, INT

Top rushers

- TULN – Corey Dauphine – 9 carries, 75 yards, TD
- ARMY – Kelvin Hopkins Jr. – 24 carries, 132 yards, 2 TD

Top receivers

- TULN – Amare Jones – 6 receptions, 104 yards, TD
- ARMY – Camden Harrison – 5 receptions, 103 yards, TD

Statistics	Tulane	Army
First downs	28	21
Total yards	525	363
Rushing yards	324	193
Passing yards	201	170
Turnovers	2	1
Time of possession	31:07	28:53

=== UConn ===
Connecticut at Tulane – Game summary

Quarter	1	2	3	4	Total
Huskies	0	0	0	7	7
Green Wave	14	14	14	7	49

at Yulman Stadium, New Orleans, LA

- Date: October 12
- Game time: 2:45 p.m. CDT
- Game weather: 73 °F (23 °C); cloudy; Wind: 9 N
- Game attendance: 17,040
- Referee: Henry Johns
- TV announcers (ESPNU): Kevin Brown (play-by-play) Andre Ware (color)

Game information

First quarter

- (08:51) TULN TD – Corey Dauphine 57-yard rush, Merek Glover kick
  Tulane 7–0; Drive: 5 plays, 88 yards, 1:34
- (03:55) TULN TD – Darnell Mooney 22-yard pass from Justin McMillan, Merek Glover kick
  Tulane 14–0; Drive: 8 plays, 58 yards, 2:41

Second quarter

- (10:57) TULN TD – Macon Clark 20-yard interception returned, Merek Glover kick
  Tulane 21–0; Drive: 2 plays, 0 yards, 0:49
- (05:40) TULN TD – Justin McMillan 14-yard rush, Merek Glover kick
  Tulane 28–0; Drive: 10 plays, 65 yards, 4:01

Third quarter

- (07:22) TULN TD – Cameron Carroll 2-yard pass from Justin McMillan, Merek Glover kick
  Tulane 35–0; Drive: 6 plays, 72 yards, 2:25
- (03:07) TULN TD – Keon Howard 9-yard rush, Merek Glover kick
  Tulane 42–0; Drive: 9 plays, 59 yards, 2:46

Fourth quarter

- (06:43) TULN TD – Jha'Quan Jackson 14-yard pass from Keon Howard, Merek Glover kick
  Tulane 49–0; Drive: 9 plays, 59 yards, 4:29
- (02:27) UCONN TD – Cameron Hairston 16-yard pass from Jack Zergiotis, Clayton Harris kick
  Tulane 49–7; Drive: 9 plays, 75 yards, 4:16

Top passers

- UCONN – Mike Beaudry – 15/24, 101 yards, INT
- TULN – Justin McMillan – 18/24, 231 yards, 2 TD

Top rushers

- UCONN – Kevin Mensah – 15 carries, 41 yards
- TULN – Corey Dauphine – 5 carries, 85 yards, TD

Top receivers

- UCONN – Jayce Medlock – 3 receptions, 42 yards
- TULN – Darnell Mooney – 4 receptions, 77 yards, TD

Statistics	UConn	Tulane
First downs	14	31
Total yards	234	634
Rushing yards	100	311
Passing yards	134	323
Turnovers	1	0
Time of possession	30:49	29:11

=== At Memphis ===
Tulane at Memphis – Game summary

Quarter	1	2	3	4	Total
Green Wave	3	7	0	7	17
Tigers	13	21	6	7	47

at Liberty Bowl Memorial Stadium, Memphis, TN

- Date: October 18
- Game time: 6:00 p.m. CDT
- Game weather: 69 °F (21 °C); partly cloudy
- Game attendance: 30,221
- Referee: C. Lamertina
- TV: ESPN2

Game information

First quarter

- (12:03) TULN FG – Merek Glover 31-yard field goal
  Tulane 3–0; Drive: 7 plays, 61 yards, 2:57
- (08:04) MEM TD – Kenneth Gainwell 32-yard pass from Brady White, Riley Patterson kick
  Memphis 7–3; Drive: 10 plays, 65 yards, 3:50
- (03:20) MEM TD – Calvin Austin 11-yard pass from Brady White, two-point conversion pass attempt failed
  Memphis 13–3; Drive: 5 plays, 46 yards, 2:47

Second quarter

- (13:08) TULN TD – Justin McMillan 7-yard rush, Merek Glover kick
  Memphis 13–10; Drive: 12 plays, 75 yards, 5:12
- (09:08) MEM TD – Joe Magnifico 3-yard pass from Brady White, Riley Patterson kick
  Memphis 20–10; Drive: 9 plays, 49 yards, 3:50
- (01:49) MEM TD – Calvin Austin 46-yard pass from Brady White, Riley Patterson kick
  Memphis 27–10; Drive: 10 plays, 90 yards, 4:49
- (00:19) MEM TD – Kenneth Gainwell 1-yard rush, Riley Patterson kick
  Memphis 34–10; Drive: 3 plays, 21 yards, 1:16

Third quarter

- (12:54) MEM FG – Riley Patterson 29-yard field goal
  Memphis 37–10; Drive: 5 plays, 64 yards, 1:58
- (07:53) MEM FG – Riley Patterson 34-yard field goal
  Memphis 40–10; Drive: 7 plays, 64 yards, 3:38

Fourth quarter

- (09:47) MEM TD – Kenneth Gainwell 27-yard pass from Brady White, Riley Patterson kick
  Memphis 47–10; Drive: 5 plays, 53 yards, 3:09
- (08:07) TULN TD – Darnell Mooney 32-yard pass from Justin McMillan, Sterling Stockwell kick
  Memphis 47–17; Drive: 4 plays, 85 yards, 1:35

Top passers

- TULN – Justin McMillan – 15/28, 187 yards, TD, 3 INT
- MEM – Brady White – 21/29, 358, 5 TD

Top rushers

- TULN – Justin McMillan – 15 carries, 89 yards, TD
- MEM – Kenneth Gainwell – 18 carries, 104 yards, TD

Top receivers

- TULN – Darnell Mooney – 5 receptions, 65 yards, TD
- MEM – Kenneth Gainwell – 9 receptions, 203 yards, 2 TD

Statistics	Tulane	Memphis
First downs	16	28
Total yards	267	545
Rushing yards	59	350
Passing yards	208	195
Turnovers	2	1
Time of possession	26:18	33:42

=== At Navy ===
Tulane at Navy – Game summary

Quarter	1	2	3	4	Total
Green Wave	0	14	14	10	38
Midshipmen	21	10	0	10	41

at Navy–Marine Corps Memorial Stadium, Annapolis, MD

- Date: October 26
- Game time: 2:30 p.m. CDT
- Game weather: 64 °F (18 °C); partly cloudy
- Game attendance: 31,118
- Referee: Mike Roche
- TV: CBS Sports Network

Game information

First quarter

- (11:49) NAVY TD – Jamale Carothers 52-yard rush, Bijan Nichols kick
  Navy 7–0; Drive: 8 plays, 75 yards, 3:11
- (05:09) NAVY TD – Jamale Carothers 35-yard rush, Bijan Nichols kick
  Navy 14–0; Drive: 10 plays, 82 yards, 5:14
- (00:17) NAVY TD – Jamale Carothers 31-yard pass from Malcolm Perry, Bijan Nichols kick
  Navy 21–0; Drive: 7 plays, 83 yards, 3:18

Second quarter

- (09:40) NAVY FG – Bijan Nichols 31-yard field goal
  Navy 24–0; Drive: 7 plays, 58 yards, 4:00
- (07:45) TULN TD – Justin McMillan 1-yard rush, Merek Glover kick
  Navy 24–7; Drive: 5 plays, 79 yards, 1:55
- (04:19) TULN TD – Darnell Mooney 22-yard pass from Justin McMillan, Merek Glover kick
  Navy 24–14; Drive: 3 plays, 72 yards, 0:54
- (02:03) NAVY TD – Diego Fagot 17-yard interception returned, Bijan Nichols kick
  Navy 31–14; Drive: 1 play, 0 yards, 0:02

Third quarter

- (07:43) TULN TD – Jaetavian Toles 5-yard pass from Justin McMillan, Merek Glover kick
  Navy 31–21; Drive: 7 plays, 46 yards, 3:08
- (01:59) TULN TD – Ygenio Booker 2-yard pass from Justin McMillan, Merek Glover kick
  Navy 31–28; Drive: 9 plays, 39 yards, 4:20

Fourth quarter

- (10:17) TULN FG – Merek Glover 39-yard field goal
  Tied 31–31; Drive: 11 plays, 68 yards, 5:16
- (05:23) NAVY TD – Jamale Carothers 15-yard rush, Bijan Nichols kick
  Navy 38–31; Drive: 10 plays, 75 yards, 4:54
- (01:01) TULN TD – Justin McMillan 1-yard rush, Merek Glover kick
  Tied 38–38; Drive: 12 plays, 77 yards, 4:23
- (00:00) NAVY FG – Bijan Nichols 48-yard field goal
  Navy 41–38; Drive: 7 plays, 44 yards, 1:01

Top passers

- TULN – Justin McMillan – 20/29, 290 yards, 3 TD, 2 INT
- NAVY – Malcolm Perry – 2/7, 68 yards, TD, INT

Top rushers

- TULN – Cameron Carroll – 8 carries, 71 yards
- NAVY – Jamale Carothers – 14 carries, 154 yards, 3 TD

Top receivers

- TULN – Darnell Mooney – 5 receptions, 112 yards, TD
- NAVY – Mychal Cooper – 1 reception, 37 yards

Statistics	Tulane	Navy
First downs	24	21
Total yards	477	453
Rushing yards	187	385
Passing yards	290	68
Turnovers	2	1
Time of possession	28:35	31:25

=== Tulsa ===
Tulsa at Tulane – Game summary

Quarter	1	2	3	4	Total
Golden Hurricane	0	16	0	10	26
Green Wave	10	14	7	7	38

at Yulman Stadium, New Orleans, LA

- Date: November 2
- Game time: 3:00 p.m. CDT
- Game weather: 60 °F (16 °C); sunny
- Game attendance: 27,417
- Referee: C. Lamertina
- TV: ESPN2

Game information

First quarter

- (09:05) TULN FG – Merek Glover 31-yard field goal
  Tulane 3–0; Drive: 9 plays, 45 yards, 4:03
- (01:23) TULN TD – Justin McMillan 5-yard rush, Merek Glover kick
  Tulane 10–0; Drive: 6 plays, 87 yards, 2:43

Second quarter

- (13:11) TUL TD – Corey Taylor II 1-yard rush, Jacob Rainey kick
  Tulane 10–7; Drive: 10 plays, 77 yards, 3:12
- (08:33) TUL FG – Jacob Rainey 40-yard field goal
  Tied 10–10; Drive: 7 plays, 33 yards, 2:46
- (04:30) TUL FG – Jacob Rainey 32-yard field goal
  Tulsa 13–10; Drive: 5 plays, 43 yards, 3:04
- (02:05) TULN TD – Justin McMillan 1-yard rush, Merek Glover kick
  Tulane 17–13; Drive: 5 plays, 65 yards, 2:17
- (01:52) TULN TD – Willie Langham 13-yard fumble returned, Merek Glover kick
  Tulane 24–13; Drive: 1 plays, -5 yards, 0:08
- (00:47) TUL FG – Jacob Rainey 37-yard field goal
  Tulane 24–16; Drive: 6 plays, 55 yards, 1:05

Third quarter

- (10:40) TULN TD – Stephon Huderson 32-yard pass from Justin McMillan, Merek Glover kick
  Tulane 31–16; Drive: 9 plays, 75 yards, 4:20

Fourth quarter

- (14:54) TUL TD – Keylon Stokes 16-yard pass from Zach Smith, Jacob Rainey kick
  Tulane 31–23; Drive: 12 plays, 66 yards, 4:56
- (10:00) TUL FG – Jacob Rainey 38-yard field goal
  Tulane 31–26; Drive: 9 plays, 16 yards, 4:11
- (04:53) TULN TD – Justin McMillan 1-yard rush, Merek Glover kick
  Tulane 38–26; Drive: 10 plays, 70 yards, 5:02

Top passers

- TUL – Zach Smith – 17/33, 270 yards, TD
- TULN – Justin McMillan – 12/16, 184 yards, TD, 2 INT

Top rushers

- TUL – Shamari Brooks – 17 carries, 65 yards
- TULN – Stephon Huderson – 7 carries, 100 yards

Top receivers

- TUL – Keylon Stokes – 3 receptions, 78 yards, TD
- TULN – Jalen McCleskey – 2 receptions, 53 yards

Statistics	Tulsa	Tulane
First downs	22	20
Total yards	398	474
Rushing yards	128	290
Passing yards	270	184
Turnovers	1	2
Time of possession	29:09	30:51

=== At Temple ===
Tulane at Temple – Game summary

Quarter	1	2	3	4	Total
Green Wave	0	7	0	14	21
Owls	3	10	9	7	29

at Lincoln Financial Field, Philadelphia, PA

- Date: November 16
- Game time: 11:00 a.m. CDT
- Game weather: 41 °F (5 °C); sunny
- Game attendance: 27,850
- Referee: Adam Savoie
- TV: ESPNU

Game information

First quarter

- (11:05) TEM FG – Will Mobley 35-yard field goal
  Temple 3–0; Drive: 5 plays, 1 yard, 1:51

Second quarter

- (11:23) TEM TD – Kenny Yeboah 4-yard pass from Todd Centeio, Will Mobley kick
  Temple 10–0; Drive: 10 plays, 80 yards, 4:58
- (08:13) TEM FG – Will Mobley 27-yard field goal
  Temple 13–0; Drive: 5 plays, 62 yards, 1:12
- (02:20) TULN TD – Cameron Carroll 5-yard rush, Merek Glover kick
  Temple 13–7; Drive: 8 plays, 55 yards, 3:08

Third quarter

- (06:24) TEM FG – Will Mobley 20-yard field goal
  Temple 16–7; Drive: 11 plays, 73 yards, 4:33
- (01:40) TEM TD – Kenny Yeboah 8-yard pass from Anthony Russo, Will Mobley PAT failed
  Temple 22–7; Drive: 9 plays, 47 yards, 3:41

Fourth quarter

- (13:57) TULN TD – Darius Bradwell 4-yard rush, Merek Glover kick
  Temple 22–14; Drive: 8 plays, 75 yards, 2:43
- (09:56) TEM TD – Jadan Blue 16-yard pass from Anthony Russo, Wil Mobley kick
  Temple 29–14; Drive: 9 plays, 75 yards, 4:01
- (06:48) TULN TD – Cameron Carroll 1-yard rush, Merek Glover kick
  Temple 29–21; Drive: 12 plays, 52 yards, 3:08

Top passers

- TULN – Justin McMillan – 11/27, 103 yards, INT
- TEM – Anthony Russo – 22/38, 221 yards, 2 TD, INT

Top rushers

- TULN – Justin McMillan – 17 carries, 64 yards
- TEM – Re'Mahn Davis – 13 carries, 69 yards

Top receivers

- TULN – Darnell Mooney – 3 receptions, 38 yards
- TEM – Jadan Blue – 12 receptions, 131 yards, TD

Statistics	Tulane	Temple
First downs	22	22
Total yards	333	402
Rushing yards	203	105
Passing yards	130	297
Turnovers	3	1
Time of possession	30:41	29:19

=== UCF ===
Central Florida at Tulane – Game summary

Quarter	1	2	3	4	Total
Knights	10	7	14	3	34
Green Wave	0	7	10	14	31

at Yulman Stadium, New Orleans, LA

- Date: November 23
- Game time: 11:00 a.m. CDT
- Game weather: 62 °F (17 °C); partly sunny
- Game attendance: 21,032
- Referee: Anthony Calabre
- TV: CBS Sports Network

Game information

First quarter

- (08:04) UCF FG – Dylan Barnas 35-yard field goal
  Central Florida 3–0; Drive: 12 plays, 62 yards, 2:12
- (03:58) UCF TD – Marlon Williams 23-yard pass from Dillon Gabriel, Dylan Barnas kick
  Central Florida 10–0; Drive: 9 plays, 62 yards, 1:46

Second quarter

- (09:53) TULN TD – Corey Dauphine 14-yard rush, Merek Glover kick
  Central Florida 10–7; Drive: 8 plays, 42 yards, 2:10
- (06:19) UCF TD – Otis Anderson Jr. 44-yard rush, Dylan Barnas kick
  Central Florida 17–7; Drive: 4 plays, 80 yards, 1:26

Third quarter

- (10:40) UCF TD – Darriel Mack Jr. 1-yard rush, Dylan Barnas kick
  Central Florida 24–7; Drive: 12 plays, 70 yards, 4:20
- (10:25) TULN TD – Stephon Huderson 98-yard kickoff returned, Merek Glover kick
  Central Florida 24–14; Drive: 0 plays, 0 yards, 0:00
- (04:50) TULN FG – Merek Glover 29-yard field goal
  Central Florida 24–17; Drive: 9 plays, 44 yards, 3:43
- (02:04) UCF TD – Anthony Robertson 2-yard pass from Darriel Mack Jr., Dylan Barnas kick
  Central Florida 31–17; Drive: 7 plays, 75 yards, 2:46

Fourth quarter

- (10:43) UCF FG – Dylan Barnas 26-yard field goal
  Central Florida 34–17; Drive: 7 plays, 45 yards, 2:05
- (07:03) TULN TD – Corey Dauphine 7-yard rush, Merek Glover kick
  Central Florida 34–24; Drive: 10 plays, 75 yards, 3:40
- (00:26) TULN TD – Jalen McCleskey 7-yard pass from Justin McMillan, Merek Glover kick
  Central Florida 34–31; Drive: 9 plays, 75 yards, 1:23

Top passers

- UCF – Dillon Gabriel – 24/46, 317 yards, TD
- TULN – Justin McMillan – 13/27, 181 yards, TD

Top rushers

- UCF – Dillon Gabriel – 12 carries, 58 yards
- TULN – Justin McMillan – 23 carries, 102 yards

Top receivers

- UCF – Marlon Williams – 9 receptions, 119 yards, TD
- TULN – Jalen McCleskey – 3 receptions, 77 yards, TD

Statistics	UCF	Tulane
First downs	23	21
Total yards	484	402
Rushing yards	165	221
Passing yards	319	181
Turnovers	0	0
Time of possession	29:15	30:45

=== At SMU ===
Tulane at Southern Methodist – Game summary

Quarter	1	2	3	4	Total
Green Wave	7	3	7	3	20
Mustangs	14	7	0	16	37

at Gerald J. Ford Stadium, University Park, TX

- Date: November 30
- Game time: 3:00 p.m. CDT
- Game weather: 71 °F (22 °C); sunny
- Game attendance: 20,761
- Referee: Adam Savoie
- TV: ESPNU

Game information

First quarter

- (07:57) SMU TD – Myron Gailliard 30-yard pass from Shane Buechele, Kevin Robeldo kick
  Southern Methodist 7–0; Drive: 5 plays, 57 yards, 1:38
- (03:49) SMU TD – Kylen Granson 8-yard pass from Shane Buechele, Kevin Robeldo kick
  Southern Methodist 14–0; Drive: 2 plays, 8 yards, 0:12
- (00:01) TULN TD – Cameron Carroll 3-yard rush, Merek Glover kick
  Southern Methodist 14–7; Drive: 9 plays, 60 yards, 3:41

Second quarter

- (02:32) SMU TD – Xavier Jones 1-yard rush, Kevin Robeldo kick
  Southern Methodist 21–7; Drive: 4 plays, 14 yards, 1:20
- (00:00) TULN FG – Merek Glover 33-yard field goal
  Southern Methodist 21–10; Drive: 14 plays, 64 yards, 2:21

Third quarter

- (06:46) TULN TD – Corey Dauphine 35-yard rush, Merek Glover kick
  Southern Methodist 21–17; Drive: 6 plays, 83 yards, 1:45

Fourth quarter

- (10:23) SMU TD – James Proche 26-yard pass from Shane Buechele, two-point rush attempt failed
  Southern Methodist 27–17; Drive: 13 plays, 93 yards, 4:32
- (07:28) SMU TD – Xavier Jones 25-yard rush, Kevin Robeldo kick
  Southern Methodist 34–17; Drive: 4 plays, 37 yards, 1:30
- (04:48) TULN FG – Merek Glover 42-yard field goal
  Southern Methodist 34–20; Drive: 8 plays, 52 yards, 2:33
- (03:02) SMU FG – Kevin Robeldo 25-yard field goal
  Southern Methodist 37–20; Drive: 6 plays, 22 yards, 1:41

Top passers

- TULN – Justin McMillan – 22/37, 242 yards
- SMU – Shane Buechele – 15/27, 180 yards, 3 TD, INT

Top rushers

- TULN – Corey Dauphine – 10 carries, 52 yards, TD
- SMU – Xavier Jones – 18 carries, 125 yards, 2 TD

Top receivers

- TULN – Tyrick James – 5 receptions, 62 yards
- SMU – James Proche – 7 receptions, 71 yards, TD

Statistics	Tulane	SMU
First downs	26	18
Total yards	465	377
Rushing yards	223	197
Passing yards	242	180
Turnovers	2	1
Time of possession	36:09	23:51

=== Vs. Southern Miss (Armed Forces Bowl) ===
Southern Mississippi vs. Tulane – Game summary

Quarter	1	2	3	4	Total
Golden Eagles	13	0	0	0	13
Green Wave	0	6	24	0	30

at Amon G. Carter Stadium, Fort Worth, TX

- Date: January 4
- Game time: 10:30 a.m. CDT
- Game weather: 48 °F (9 °C); sunny
- Game attendance: 38,513
- Referee: Kevin Mar
- TV: ESPN

Game information

First quarter

- (12:07) USM TD – Quez Watkins 44-yard pass from Jack Abraham, Andrew Stein PAT failed
  Southern Miss 6–0; Drive: 8 plays, 61 yards, 2:53
- (05:23) USM TD – Jack Abraham 3-yard rush, Andrew Stein kick
  Southern Miss 13–0; Drive: 11 plays, 78 yards, 5:31

Second quarter

- (12:41) TULN FG – Merek Glover 31-yard field goal
  Southern Miss 13–3; Drive: 10 plays, 51 yards, 3:47
- (04:37) TULN FG – Merek Glover 31-yard field goal
  Southern Miss 13–6; Drive: 7 plays, 34 yards, 3:12

Third quarter

- (13:20) TULN TD – Jalen McCleskey 52-yard pass from Justin McMillan, Merek Glover kick
  Tied 13–13; Drive: 5 plays, 77 yards, 1:40
- (06:16) TULN FG – Merek Glover 36-yard field goal
  Tulane 16–13; Drive: 10 plays, 59 yards, 5:20
- (05:37) TULN TD – Jacob Robertson Jr. 7-yard pass from Justin McMillan, Merek Glover kick
  Tulane 23–13; Drive: 1 play, 2 yards, 0:05
- (01:54) TULN TD – Amare Jones 20-yard pass from Justin McMillan, Merek Glover kick
  Tulane 30–13; Drive: 4 plays, 66 yards, 1:40

Top passers

- USM – Jack Abraham – 17/23, 167 yards, TD
- TULN – Justin McMillan – 13/18, 215 yards, 3 TD

Top rushers

- USM – Trivenskey Mosley – 7 carries, 43 yards
- TULN – Cameron Carroll – 9 carries, 48 yards

Top receivers

- USM – Quez Watkins – 9 receptions, 154 yards, TD
- TULN – Jalen McCleskey – 2 receptions, 87 yards, TD

Statistics	Southern Miss	Tulane
First downs	15	19
Total yards	359	379
Rushing yards	58	164
Passing yards	301	215
Turnovers	2	0
Time of possession	26:07	33:53

== Players drafted into the NFL ==
Round	Pick	Player	Position	NFL Club
5	173	Darnell Mooney	WR	Chicago Bears
7	237	BoPete Keyes	CB	Kansas City Chiefs
