= 2019 Houston Cougars football team =

American college football season

2019 Houston Cougars football
- Conference: American Athletic Conference
- West Division
- Record: 4–8 (2–6 American)
- Head coach: Dana Holgorsen (1st season)
- Co-offensive coordinators: Marquel Blackwell (1st season); Brandon Jones (1st season)
- Offensive scheme: Spread
- Defensive coordinator: Joe Cauthen (1st season)
- Co-defensive coordinator: Doug Belk (1st season)
- Base defense: 4–2–5
- Home stadium: TDECU Stadium

2019 American Athletic Conference football standings
	Conf.			Overall
Team	W		L	W		L
East Division
No. 21 Cincinnati xy	7	–	1	11	–	3
No. 24 UCF	6	–	2	10	–	3
Temple	5	–	3	8	–	5
South Florida	2	–	6	4	–	8
East Carolina	1	–	7	4	–	8
UConn	0	–	8	2	–	10
West Division
No. 17 Memphis xy$	7	–	1	12	–	2
No. 20 Navy x	7	–	1	11	–	2
SMU	6	–	2	10	–	3
Tulane	3	–	5	7	–	6
Houston	2	–	6	4	–	8
Tulsa	2	–	6	4	–	8
Championship: Memphis 29, Cincinnati 24
$ – Conference champion; x – Division champion/co-champions; y – Championship game participant; Rankings from AP Poll

The 2019 Houston Cougars football team represented the University of Houston in the 2019 NCAA Division I FBS football season. The Cougars played their home games at TDECU Stadium in Houston, Texas, and competed in the West Division of the American Athletic Conference. They were led by first-year head coach Dana Holgorsen. They finished the season 4–8, 2–6 in AAC play to finish in a tie for fifth-place in the West Division.

== Preseason ==
=== AAC media poll ===
The AAC media poll was released on July 16, 2019, with the Cougars predicted to finish second in the AAC West Division.

=== Preseason All-AAC teams ===
Houston placed six players to the All-AAC team, sanctioned by Athlon Sports.

Offense

1st team

- D'Eriq King – SR, Quarterback

2nd team

- Marquez Stevenson – SR, Wide receiver
- Josh Jones – SR, Offensive lineman
- Jarrid Williams – GR, Offensive lineman

Defensive

2nd team

- Isaiah Chambers – JR, Defensive lineman
- Gleson Sprewell – JR, Safety

=== Award watch lists ===
Listed in the order that they were released

Award	Player	Position	Year
Maxwell Award	D'Eriq King	QB	SR
Davey O'Brien Award	D'Eriq King	QB	SR
Biletnikoff Award	Marquez Stevenson	WR	SR
Outland Trophy	Josh Jones	OT	SR
Paul Hornung Award	Marquez Stevenson	WR	SR
Walter Camp Player of the Year Award	D'Eriq King	QB	SR
CFPA Performer of the Year Award	D'Eriq King	QB	SR
Earl Campbell Award	D'Eriq King	QB	SR
Manning Award	D'Eriq King	QB	SR
Ted Hendricks Award	Isaiah Chambers	DL	JR
Ray Guy Award	Dane Roy	P	SR

== Roster ==
2019 Houston Cougars football team roster
Players
Coaches
Offense

Pos.	#	Name	Class
WR	1	Bryson Smith	So
WR	2	Keith Corbin	Sr
QB	3	Clayton Tune	So
QB	4	D'Eriq King	Sr
WR	5	Marquez Stevenson	Jr
QB	6	Logan Holgorsen	Fr
RB	8	Chandler Smith	Jr
WR	9	Courtney Lark	Sr
WR	10	Bryson Jackson	Fr
WR	12	Ke'Andre Street	Fr
WR	13	Jeremy Singleton	So
QB	14	Ike Ogbogu	So
WR	17	Terry Mark	Sr
WR	19	Julon Williams	Fr
RB	21	Patrick Carr	Sr
RB	22	Kyle Porter	Jr
RB	23	James Fullbright III	Fr
WR	26	Ja'Kori Morgan	Fr
WR	27	Henry Thomas	Fr
RB	34	Mulbah Car	Sr
WR	36	Bryce Washington	Jr
RB	37	Terrell Brown	Fr
WR	39	Andrew Segovia	Jr
RB	40	Kelan Walker	Fr
WR	41	Osby Mitchell III	So
TE	45	Spencer Wells	Fr
TE	48	Bo Alexander	Sr
OL	52	Braylon Jones	Sr
OL	56	Dixie Wooten III	So
OL	60	Kordell Snyder	Jr
OL	62	Jarrid Williams	Sr
OL	64	Dennis Bardwell	Jr
OL	65	Gio Pancotti	Jr
OL	67	Cam'Ron Johnson	Fr
OL	70	Jordan Boatman	So
OL	71	Max Banes	Fr
OL	73	Kameron Lewis	Fr
OL	74	Josh Jones	Sr
OL	75	Jack Freeman	Fr
OL	76	Patrick Paul	Fr
OL	77	Keenan Murphy	Jr
OL	79	Chayse Todd	Fr
WR	81	Tre'Von Bradley	So
WR	83	Peyton Sawyer	Fr
WR	84	Cole McGowan	Jr
TE	85	Christian Trahan	So
WR	86	Quavon Beckford	So
TE	88	Shane Creamer	So
TE	89	Parker Eichenberger	So

Defense

Pos.	#	Name	Class
DL	1	Eyabi Anoma	So
S	2	Deontay Anderson	Jr
S	3	Grant Stuard	Jr
DL	4	Leroy Godfrey	Sr
DL	5	Aymiel Fleming	Sr
CB	6	Damarion Williams	Jr
LB	8	Jordan Carmouche	Jr
CB	10	Colin Samuel	Sr
DL	12	David Anenih	Jr
CB	13	Marcus Jones	Jr
S	14	Ronald Nunnery	Fr
LB	15	Zamar Kirven	So
CB	16	Ka'Darian Smith	Sr
S	17	Hasaan Hypolite	Fr
CB	18	Kelvin Clemmons	Jr
CB	19	Javian Smith	Jr
S	20	Jordan Moore	Fr
S	21	Gleson Sprewell	Jr
CB	22	Deondre Dansby	Fr
DL	23	Willie Smith III	So
LB	24	Donavan Mutin	So
CB	25	D. J. Small	So
LB	26	Elijah Gooden	Jr
S	27	Amaud Willis-Dalton	So
S	28	Thabo Mwaniki	Jr
S	29	Darius Gilbert	Sr
DL	30	Alexander Duke	So
DL	31	Derek Parish	So
S	32	Gervarrius Owens	So
S	33	Garrison Vaughn	Fr
CB	34	Dylan Dixon	Fr
CB	35	Johnathan Phenix	Fr
CB	39	Shaun Lewis	So
DB	40	Brody Anderson	Fr
CB	41	Torey Richardson	Fr
LB	42	Terrance Edgeston	Jr
LB	43	DeKalen Goodson	Fr
LB	45	Jordan Milburn	Sr
LB	46	Melvin Larkins	Fr
DL	47	Taures Payne	Jr
DL	50	Hakeem Ajijolaiya	Fr
LB	52	Ken Savanah	Fr
LB	59	Jacob Daulong	So
DL	80	Noah Jones	So
DL	90	Olivier Charles-Pierre	Jr
DL	92	Logan Hall	So
DL	93	Atlias Bell	Jr
DL	94	Isaiah Chambers	Jr
DL	95	Jamykal Neal	So
DL	96	Nelson Ceaser	Fr
DL	98	Payton Turner	Jr
DL	99	Blake Young	Sr

Special teams

Pos.	#	Name	Class
P	38	Dane Roy	Sr
LS	44	Anthony Cantu	Sr
LS	46	Davis Beal	Fr
K	47	Dalton Witherspoon	Jr
P	49	Ryan Hanson	Fr
K	51	Kyle Ramsey	Fr
LS	97	Nick Wildberger	Sr

Head coach

- Dana Holgorsen (Iowa Wesleyan)

Coordinators/assistant coaches

- Marquel Blackwell (South Florida)
  Co-offensive coordinator/quarterbacks
- Brandon Jones (Texas Tech)
  Co-offensive coordinator/offensive line
- Joe Cauthen (Stephen F. Austin)
  Defensive coordinator/linebackers
- Doug Belk (Carson–Newman)
  Co-defensive coordinator/safeties
- Blake Gideon (Texas)
  Special teams coordinator/nickelbacks
- Tyron Carrier (Houston)
  Wide receivers
- Shannon Dawson (Wingate)
  Tight ends
- Brian Early (Arkansas–Monticello)
  Defensive line
- Zac Etheridge (Auburn)
  Cornerbacks
- Justin Johnson (Houston)
  Running backs
- Mike Burchett (Kentucky)
  Offensive football analyst
- Will Weaver (Valdosta State)
  Defensive football analyst
- Mark Scott (Hillsdale College)
  Special teams football analyst

Legend

- (C) Team captain
- (S) Suspended
- (I) Ineligible
- Injured
- Redshirt

Roster
Last update: May 13, 2020

== Schedule ==
Date	Time	Opponent	Site	TV	Result	Attendance
September 1	6:30 p.m.	at No. 4 Oklahoma*	Gaylord Family Oklahoma Memorial Stadium; Norman, OK	ABC	L 31–49	84,534
September 7	7:00 p.m.	Prairie View A&M*	TDECU Stadium; Houston, TX	ESPN3	W 37–17	29,360
September 13	8:15 p.m.	vs. No. 20 Washington State*	NRG Stadium; Houston, TX (AdvoCare Texas Kickoff)	ESPN	L 24–31	40,523
September 19	7:00 p.m.	at Tulane	Yulman Stadium; New Orleans, LA	ESPN	L 31–38	21,032
September 28	6:30 p.m.	at North Texas*	Apogee Stadium; Denton, TX	CBSSN Facebook	W 46–25	30,123
October 12	2:30 p.m.	No. 25 Cincinnati	TDECU Stadium; Houston, TX	ESPN2	L 23–38	25,716
October 19	11:00 a.m.	at UConn	Rentschler Field; East Hartford, CT	ESPNU	W 24–17	19,760
October 24	7:30 p.m.	No. 16 SMU	TDECU Stadium; Houston, TX (rivalry)	ESPN	L 31–34	24,543
November 2	11:00 a.m.	at UCF	Spectrum Stadium; Orlando, FL	ESPN2	L 29–44	41,361
November 16	2:30 p.m.	No. 18 Memphis^{†}	TDECU Stadium; Houston, TX	ESPN2	L 27–45	25,149
November 23	6:30 p.m.	at Tulsa	H. A. Chapman Stadium; Tulsa, OK	ESPNU	W 24–14	16,120
November 30	6:00 p.m.	Navy	TDECU Stadium; Houston, TX	ESPN2	L 41–56	22,824
*Non-conference game; ^{†}Homecoming; Rankings from AP Poll and CFP Rankings after November 5 released prior to game; All times are in Central time

Schedule source:

== Game summaries ==
=== At Oklahoma ===
Houston at Oklahoma – Game summary

Quarter	1	2	3	4	Total
Cougars	0	10	7	14	31
No. 4 Sooners	7	14	21	7	49

at Gaylord Family Oklahoma Memorial Stadium, Norman, OK

- Date: September 1
- Game time: 6:30 p.m. CDT
- Game weather: 88 °F (31 °C); sunny
- Game attendance: 84,534
- Referee: Mike Roche
- TV announcers (ABC): Sean McDonough (play-by-play), Todd Blackledge (analyst), Holly Rowe (reporter)

Game information

First quarter

- (12:21) OKLA TD – Jeremiah Hall 14-yard pass from Jalen Hurts, Calum Sutherland kick
  Oklahoma 7–0; Drive: 3 plays, 61 yards, 1:10

Second quarter

- (14:10) OKLA TD – Jalen Hurts 1-yard rush, Calum Sutherland kick
  Oklahoma 14–0; Drive: 11 plays, 89 yards, 5:34
- (08:09) OKLA TD – CeeDee Lamb 45-yard pass from Jalen Hurts, Calum Sutherland kick
  Oklahoma 21–0; Drive: 8 plays, 77 yards, 4:13
- (04:58) HOU TD – Kyle Porter 23-yard pass from D'Eriq King, Dalton Witherspoon kick
  Oklahoma 21–7; Drive: 6 plays, 81 yards, 3:11
- (00:26) HOU FG – Dalton Witherspoon 34-yard field goal
  Oklahoma 21–10; Drive: 6 plays, 53 yards, 2:02

Third quarter

- (12:38) OKLA TD – Charleston Rambo 56-yard pass from Jalen Hurts, Calum Sutherland kick
  Oklahoma 28–10; Drive: 5 plays, 75 yards, 2:22
- (07:47) OKLA TD – Jalen Hurts 3-yard rush, Calum Sutherland kick
  Oklahoma 35–10; Drive: 5 plays, 83 yards, 2:20
- (03:03) HOU TD – Mulbah Car 7-yard rush, Dalton Witherspoon kick
  Oklahoma 35–17; Drive: 6 plays, 81 yards, 3:11
- (00:00) OKLA TD – Jalen Hurts 1-yard rush, Calum Sutherland kick
  Oklahoma 42–17; Drive: 6 plays, 79 yards, 3:03

Fourth quarter

- (09:11) HOU TD – Marquez Stevenson 4-yard pass from D'Eriq King, Dalton Witherspoon kick
  Oklahoma 42–24; Drive: 12 plays, 87 yards, 5:49
- (02:11) HOU TD – D'Eriq King 5-yard rush, Dalton Witherspoon kick
  Oklahoma 42–31; Drive: 7 plays, 72 yards, 1:50
- (01:17) OKLA TD – Rhamondre Stevenson 21-yard rush, Calum Sutherland kick
  Oklahoma 49–31; Drive: 4 plays, 42 yards, 0:54

Top passers

- HOU – D'Eriq King – 14/27, 167 yards, 2 TD
- OKLA – Jalen Hurts – 20/23, 332 yards, 3 TD

Top rushers

- HOU – D'Eriq King – 15 carries, 103 yards, TD
- OKLA – Jalen Hurts – 16 carries, 176 yards, 3 TD

Top receivers

- HOU – Marquez Stevenson – 7 receptions, 80 yards, TD
- OKLA – Charleston Rambo – 3 receptions, 105 yards, TD

Statistics	Houston	Oklahoma
First downs	24	30
Total yards	408	686
Rushing yards	241	354
Passing yards	167	332
Turnovers	0	2
Time of possession	31:40	28:20

=== Prairie View A&M ===
Prairie View A&M at Houston – Game summary

Quarter	1	2	3	4	Total
Panthers	3	7	0	7	17
Cougars	24	10	3	0	37

at TDECU Stadium, Houston, TX

- Date: September 7
- Game time: 7:00 p.m. CDT
- Game weather: 96 °F (36 °C); clear and humid
- Game attendance: 29,360
- Referee: Hank Johns
- TV: ESPN3

Game information

First quarter

- (11:28) HOU FG – Dalton Witherspoon 46-yard field goal
  Houston 3–0; Drive: 9 plays, 36 yards, 3:32
- (09:19) HOU TD – Kyle Porter 20-yard rush, Dalton Witherspoon kick
  Houston 10–0; Drive: 2 plays, 28 yards, 0:36
- (05:46) PVAMU FG – Zach Elder 23-yard field goal
  Houston 10–3; Drive: 8 plays, 59 yards, 3:33
- (02:27) HOU TD – D'Eriq King 1-yard rush, Dalton Witherspoon kick
  Houston 17–3; Drive: 7 plays, 65 yards, 3:19
- (00:19) HOU TD – Keith Corbin 21-yard pass from D'Eriq King, Dalton Witherspoon kick
  Houston 24–3; Drive: 5 plays, 40 yards, 1:39

Second quarter

- (10:25) HOU TD – D'Eriq King 18-yard rush, Dalton Witherspoon kick
  Houston 31–3; Drive: 9 plays, 53 yards, 4:14
- (06:19) HOU FG – Dalton Witherspoon 22-yard field goal
  Houston 34–3; Drive: 7 plays, 20 yards, 3:02
- (00:20) PVAMU TD –Tristen Wallace 16-yard pass from Trazon Connley, Zach Elder kick
  Houston 34–10; Drive: 16 plays, 85 yards, 5:59

Third quarter

- (10:06) HOU FG – Dalton Witherspoon 29-yard field goal
  Houston 37–10; Drive: 11 plays, 48 yards, 4:05

Fourth quarter

- (02:04) PVAMU TD – Kristian Mosley 54-yard pass from Tyriek Starks, Zach Elder kick
  Houston 37–17; Drive: 6 plays, 69 yards, 2:48

Top passers

- PVAMU – Trazon Connley – 9/17, 129 yards, TD
- HOU – D'Eriq King – 15/26, 139 yards, TD, INT

Top rushers

- PVAMU – Jalen Morton – 3 carries, 23 yards
- HOU – Kyle Porter – 19 carries, 120 yards, TD

Top receivers

- PVAMU – Tristen Wallace – 5 receptions, 77 yards, TD
- HOU – Keith Corbin – 4 receptions, 62 yards, TD

Statistics	Prairie View A&M	Houston
First downs	18	20
Total yards	318	380
Rushing yards	70	236
Passing yards	248	144
Turnovers	1	2
Time of possession	26:20	31:53

=== Vs. Washington State ===
Washington State vs. Houston – Game summary

Quarter	1	2	3	4	Total
No. 20 WSU Cougars	0	7	14	10	31
HOU Cougars	0	14	0	10	24

at NRG Stadium, Houston, TX

- Date: September 13
- Game time: 8:15 p.m. CDT
- Game weather: 96 °F (36 °C); clear and humid
- Game attendance: 29,360
- Referee: Hank Johns
- TV: ESPN

Game information

Second quarter

- (07:33) HOU TD – Marquez Stevenson 13-yard pass from D'Eriq King, Dalton Witherspoon kick
  Houston 7–0; Drive: 15 plays, 82 yards, 7:27
- (05:36) WSU TD – Easop Winston 39-yard pass from Anthony Gordon, Blake Mazza kick
  Tied 7–7; Drive: 5 plays, 72 yards, 1:57
- (02:27) HOU TD – D'Eriq King 1-yard rush, Dalton Witherspoon kick
  Houston 14–7; Drive: 7 plays, 75 yards, 3:09

Third quarter

- (10:24) WSU TD – Max Borghi 1-yard rush, Blake Mazza kick
  Tied 14–14; Drive: 6 plays, 44 yards, 2:24
- (07:30) WSU TD – Dezmon Patmon 39-yard pass from Anthony Gordon, Blake Mazza kick
  Washington State 21–14; Drive: 4 plays, 91 yards, 1:25

Fourth quarter

- (10:45) HOU FG – Dalton Witherspoon 42-yard field goal
  Washington State 21–17; Drive: 6 plays, 29 yards, 1:51
- (06:43) WSU TD – Travell Harris 7-yard pass from Anthony Gordon, Blake Mazza kick
  Washington State 28–17; Drive: 8 plays, 95 yards, 4:02
- (03:50) WSU FG – Blake Mazza 22-yard field goal
  Washington State 31–17; Drive: 6 plays, 21 yards, 2:44
- (02:21) HOU TD – D'Eriq King 12-yard rush, Dalton Witherspoon kick
  Washington State 31–24; Drive: 6 plays, 75 yards, 1:29

Top passers

- WSU – Anthony Gordon – 36/48, 440 yards, 3 TD, INT
- HOU – D'Eriq King – 13/24, 128 yards, TD

Top rushers

- WSU – Max Borghi – 9 carries, 40 yards, TD
- HOU – D'Eriq King – 17 carries, 94 yards, 2 TD

Top receivers

- WSU – Brandon Arconado – 9 receptions, 115 yards
- HOU – Keith Corbin – 3 receptions, 54 yards

Statistics	Washington State	Houston
First downs	25	22
Total yards	489	367
Rushing yards	49	239
Passing yards	440	128
Turnovers	1	2
Time of possession	32:06	27:54

=== At Tulane ===
Houston at Tulane – Game summary

Quarter	1	2	3	4	Total
Cougars	14	14	0	7	35
Green Wave	7	7	7	17	38

at Yulman Stadium, New Orleans, LA

- Date: September 19
- Game time: 7:00 p.m. CDT
- Game weather: 85 °F (29 °C); partly cloudy
- Game attendance: 21,032
- Referee: A. Calabrese
- TV: ESPN

Game information

First quarter

- (14:46) HOU TD – Marquez Stevenson 75-yard pass from D'Eriq King, Dalton Witherspoon kick
  Houston 7–0; Drive: 1 play, 75 yards, 0:14
- (07:24) TULN TD – Jalen McCleskey 38-yard pass from Justin McMillan, Merek Glover kick
  Tied 7–7; Drive: 5 plays, 48 yards, 2:08
- (03:25) HOU TD – Kyle Porter 1-yard rush, Dalton Witherspoon kick
  Houston 14–7; Drive: 10 plays, 75 yards, 3:59

Second quarter

- (14:35) HOU TD – Keith Corbin 28-yard pass from D'Eriq King, Dalton Witherspoon kick
  Houston 21–7; Drive: 3 plays, 75 yards, 0:40
- (13:16) HOU TD – D'Eriq King 35-yard rush, Dalton Witherspoon kick
  Houston 28–7; Drive: 3 plays, 35 yards, 0:20
- (10:11) TULN TD – Stephon Huderson 9-yard rush, Merek Glover kick
  Houston 28–14; Drive: 9 plays, 75 yards, 3:05

Third quarter

- (12:53) TULN TD – Darnell Mooney 48-yard pass from Justin McMillan, Merek Glover kick
  Houston 28–21; Drive: 5 plays, 59 yards, 2:07

Fourth quarter

- (14:22) TULN TD – Justin McMillan 15-yard rush, Merek Glover kick
  Tied 28–28; Drive: 10 plays, 93 yards, 4:19
- (06:10) TULN FG – Merek Glover 44-yard field goal
  Tulane 31–28; Drive: 10 plays, 42 yards, 4:22
- (00:21) HOU FG – Dalton Witherspoon 24-yard field goal
  Tied 31–31; Drive: 16 plays, 68 yards, 5:49
- (00:03) TULN TD – Jalen McCleskey 53-yard pass from Justin McMillan, Merek Glover kick
  Tulane 38–31; Drive: 2 plays, 71 yards, 0:18

Top passers

- HOU – D'Eriq King – 16/33, 229 yards, 2 TD, INT
- TULN – Justin McMillan – 7/20, 186 yards, 3 TD

Top rushers

- HOU – D'Eriq King – 17 carries, 116 yards, TD
- TULN – Darius Bradwell – 20 carries, 113 yards

Top receivers

- HOU – Marquez Stevenson – 2 receptions, 95 yards, TD
- TULN – Jalen McCleskey – 4 receptions, 120 yards, 2 TD

Statistics	Houston	Tulane
First downs	28	23
Total yards	533	511
Rushing yards	304	325
Passing yards	229	186
Turnovers	1	1
Time of possession	31:36	28:24

=== At North Texas ===
Houston at North Texas – Game summary

Quarter	1	2	3	4	Total
Cougars	14	3	14	15	46
Mean Green	0	6	12	7	25

at Apogee Stadium, Denton, TX

- Date: September 28
- Game time: 7:00 p.m. CDT
- Game weather: 94 °F (34 °C); mostly cloudy
- Game attendance: 30,123
- Referee: Adam Savoie
- TV: Facebook Live

Game information

First quarter

- (08:58) HOU TD – Patrick Carr 68-yard rush, Dalton Witherspoon kick
  Houston 7–0; Drive: 3 plays, 85 yards, 1:22
- (03:27) HOU TD – Courtney Link 12-yard pass from Clayton Tune, Dalton Witherspoon kick
  Houston 14–0; Drive: 9 plays, 81 yards, 4:09

Second quarter

- (14:35) HOU FG – Dalton Witherspoon 26-yard field goal
  Houston 17–0; Drive: 6 plays, 41 yards, 1:39
- (11:20) UNT FG – Ethan Mooney 41-yard field goal
  Houston 17–3; Drive: 9 plays, 42 yards, 3:15
- (00:00) UNT FG – Ethan Mooney 46-yard field goal
  Houston 17–6; Drive: 7 plays, 27 yards, 0:56

Third quarter

- (11:19) HOU TD – Patrick Carr 2-yard rush, Dalton Witherspoon kick
  Houston 24–6; Drive: 8 plays, 60 yards, 3:41
- (07:12) UNT TD – Tre Siggers 4-yard rush, two-point pass conversion attempt failed
  Houston 24–12; Drive: 11 plays, 75 yards, 4:07
- (06:57) HOU TD – Marquez Stevenson 82-yard kickoff returned, Dalton Witherspoon kick
  Houston 31–12; Drive: 0 plays, 0 yards, 0:00
- (04:13) UNT TD – Jyaire Shorter 33-yard pass from Mason Fine, two-point pass conversion attempt failed
  Houston 31–18; Drive: 8 plays, 85 yards, 2:44

Fourth quarter

- (13:34) HOU TD – Bryson Smith 60-yard punt returned, Clayton Tune two-point pass conversion to Marquez Stevenson
  Houston 39–18; Drive: 3 plays, 7 yards, 2:03
- (05:06) UNT TD – Jason Pirtle 15-yard pass from Mason Fine, Ethan Mooney kick
  Houston 39–25; Drive: 13 plays, 85 yards, 3:16
- (03:01) HOU TD – Patrick Carr 12-yard rush, Dalton Witherspoon kick
  Houston 46–25; Drive: 4 plays, 75 yards, 2:05

Top passers

- HOU – Clayton Tune – 16/20, 124 yards, TD
- UNT – Mason Fine – 35/55, 353 yards, 2 TD

Top rushers

- HOU – Patrick Carr – 16 carries, 139 yards, 3 TD
- UNT – Tre Siggers – 14 carries, 83 yards, TD

Top receivers

- HOU – Marquez Stevenson – 7 receptions, 64 yards
- UNT – Michael Lawrence – 9 receptions, 120 yards

Statistics	Houston	North Texas
First downs	17	20
Total yards	359	456
Rushing yards	235	96
Passing yards	124	360
Turnovers	0	0
Time of possession	27:02	32:58

=== Cincinnati ===
Cincinnati at Houston – Game summary

Quarter	1	2	3	4	Total
No. 25 Bearcats	14	7	0	17	38
Cougars	3	7	7	6	23

at TDECU Stadium, Houston, TX

- Date: October 12
- Game time: 2:30 p.m. CDT
- Game weather: 73 °F (23 °C); clear skies
- Game attendance: 25,716
- Referee: C. Lamertina
- TV: ESPN2

Game information

First quarter

- (12:44) CIN TD – Desmond Ridder 13-yard rush, Sam Crosa kick
  Cincinnati 7–0; Drive: 5 plays, 75 yards, 2:16
- (07:24) HOU FG – Dalton Witherspoon 31-yard field goal
  Cincinnati 7–3; Drive: 4 plays, 6 yards, 1:32
- (07:13) CIN TD – Rashad Medaris 75-yard pass from Desmond Ridder, Sam Crosa kick
  Cincinnati 14–3; Drive: 1 play, 75 yards, 0:11

Second quarter

- (11:36) HOU TD – Jeremy Singleton 50-yard pass from Bryson Smith, Dalton Witherspoon kick
  Cincinnati 14–10; Drive: 6 plays, 66 yards, 3:13
- (08:33) CIN TD – Josiah Deguara 15-yard pass from Desmond Ridder, Sam Crosa kick
  Cincinnati 21–10; Drive: 3 plays, 35 yards, 1:28

Third quarter

- (12:40) HOU TD – Marquez Stevenson 69-yard pass from Clayton Tune, Dalton Witherspoon kick
  Cincinnati 21–17; Drive: 4 plays, 85 yards, 2:20

Fourth quarter

- (13:41) CIN TD – Michael Warren II 11-yard pass from Desmond Ridder, Sam Crosa kick
  Cincinnati 28–17; Drive: 7 plays, 34 yards, 3:43
- (09:09) HOU TD – Christian Trahan 6-yard pass from Clayton Tune, two-point pass conversion attempt failed
  Cincinnati 28–23; Drive: 9 plays, 72 yards, 4:32
- (04:27) CIN FG – Sam Crosa 32-yard field goal
  Cincinnati 31–23; Drive: 10 plays, 48 yards, 4:42
- (03:28) CIN TD – Perry Young 2-yard interception return, Sam Crosa kick
  Cincinnati 38–23; Drive: 3 plays, 2 yards, 0:59

Top passers

- CIN – Desmond Ridder – 14/24, 263 yards, 3 TD, INT
- HOU – Clayton Tune – 9/27, 184 yards, 2 TD, 3 INT

Top rushers

- CIN – Michael Warren II – 17 carries, 68 yards
- HOU – Kyle Porter – 16 carries, 107 yards

Top receivers

- CIN – Rashad Medaris – 3 receptions, 121 yards, TD
- HOU – Marquez Stevenson – 3 receptions, 120 yards, TD

Statistics	Cincinnati	Houston
First downs	17	16
Total yards	394	424
Rushing yards	131	190
Passing yards	263	234
Turnovers	1	5
Time of possession	29:40	30:20

=== At UConn ===
Houston at Connecticut – Game summary

Quarter	1	2	3	4	Total
Cougars	3	7	7	7	24
Huskies	0	7	3	7	17

at Rentschler Field, East Hartford, CT

- Date: October 19
- Game time: 11:00 a.m. CDT
- Game weather: 50 °F (10 °C); brisk
- Game attendance: 19,760
- Referee: Adam Savoie
- TV announcers (ESPNU): Mike Corey (play-by-play) & Rene Ingoglia (color)

Game information

First quarter

- (09:44) HOU FG – Dalton Witherspoon 42-yard field goal
  Houston 3–0; Drive: 6 plays, 39 yards, 2:37

Second quarter

- (13:41) UCONN TD – Matt Drayton 17-yard pass from Jack Zergiotis, Clayton Harris kick
  Connecticut 7–3; Drive: 8 plays, 71 yards, 4:12
- (04:23) HOU TD – Kyle Porter 12-yard rush, Dalton Witherspoon kick
  Houston 10–7; Drive: 2 plays, 30 yards, 0:43

Third quarter

- (04:48) UCONN FG – Clayton Harris 43-yard field goal
  Tied 10–10; Drive: 9 plays, 55 yards, 4:52
- (03:31) HOU TD – Jeremy Singleton 58-yard pass from Logan Holgorsen, Dalton Witherspoon kick
  Houston 17–10; Drive: 3 plays, 75 yards, 1:17

Fourth quarter

- (03:19) HOU TD – Bryson Smith 2-yard rush, Dalton Witherspoon kick
  Houston 24–10; Drive: 13 plays, 78 yards, 6:14
- (01:40) UCONN TD – Art Thompkins 7-yard pass from Jack Zergiotis, CLayton Harris kick
  Houston 24–17; Drive: 8 plays, 63 yards, 1:39

Top passers

- HOU – Logan Holgrosen – 7/15, 123 yards, TD
- UCONN – Jack Zergiotis – 27/44, 270 yards, 2 TD, INT

Top rushers

- HOU – Kyle Porter – 18 carries, 68 yards, TD
- UCONN – Kevin Mensah – 12 carries, 93 yards

Top receivers

- HOU – Jeremy Singleton – 2 receptions, 103 yards, TD
- UCONN – Cameron Ross – 9 receptions, 75 yards

Statistics	Houston	UConn
First downs	16	23
Total yards	284	438
Rushing yards	106	168
Passing yards	178	270
Turnovers	0	1
Time of possession	24:00	36:00

=== SMU ===
Southern Methodist at Houston – Game summary

Quarter	1	2	3	4	Total
No. 16 Mustangs	7	14	10	3	34
Cougars	0	13	7	11	31

at TDECU Stadium, Houston, TX

- Date: October 24
- Game time: 6:30 p.m. CDT
- Game weather: 76 °F (24 °C); partly cloudy
- Game attendance: 24,543
- Referee: A. Calabrese
- TV: ESPN

Game information

First quarter

- (01:33) SMU TD – James Proche 15-yard pass from Shane Buechele, Kevin Robledo kick
  Southern Methodist 7–0; Drive: 7 plays, 85 yards, 2:03

Second quarter

- (14:28) HOU TD – Bryson Smith 1-yard rush, Dalton Witherspoon kick
  Tied 7–7; Drive: 5 plays, 88 yards, 2:05
- (10:41) SMU TD – Xavier Jones 62-yard rush, Kevin Robledo kick
  Southern Methodist 14–7; Drive: 2 plays, 83 yards, 0:29
- (08:14) SMU TD – Kylen Granson 11-yard pass from Shane Buechele, Kevin Robledo kick
  Southern Methodist 21–7; Drive: 5 plays, 32 yards, 1:03
- (01:56) HOU FG – Dalton Witherspoon 25-yard field goal
  Southern Methodist 21–10; Drive: 14 plays, 67 yards, 6:18
- (00:00) HOU FG – Dalton Witherspoon 34-yard field goal
  Southern Methodist 21–13; Drive: 5 plays, 29 yards, 1:46

Third quarter

- (14:13) SMU TD – Xavier Jones 2-yard rush, Kevin Robledo kick
  Southern Methodist 28–13; Drive: 1 play, 2 yards, 0:04
- (14:01) HOU TD – Marquez Stevenson 75-yard pass from Clayton Tune, Dalton Witherspoon kick
  Southern Methodist 28–20; Drive: 1 play, 75 yards, 0:12
- (10:56) SMU FG – Kevin Robledo 23-yard field goal
  Southern Methodist 31–20; Drive: 7 plays, 53 yards, 3:05

Fourth quarter

- (14:10) HOU FG – Dalton Witherspoon 40-yard field goal
  Southern Methodist 31–23; Drive: 9 plays, 71 yards, 3:36
- (08:56) SMU FG – Kevin Robledo 33-yard field goal
  Southern Methodist 34–23; Drive: 6 plays, 65 yards, 2:00
- (10:56) HOU TD – Marquez Stevenson 96-yard pass from Clayton Tune, Clayton Tune two point conversion pass to Christian Trahan
  Southern Methodist 34–31; Drive: 1 play, 96 yards, 0:12

Top passers

- SMU – Shane Buechele – 20/38, 203 yards, 2 TD, INT
- HOU – Clayton Tune – 18/33, 407 yards, 2 TD, INT

Top rushers

- SMU – Xavier Jones – 22 carries, 133 yards, 2 TD
- HOU – Mulbah Car – 18 carries, 136 yards

Top receivers

- SMU – James Proche – 7 receptions, 83 yards, TD
- HOU – Marquez Stevenson – 5 receptions, 211 yards, 2 TD

Statistics	SMU	Houston
First downs	22	22
Total yards	385	510
Rushing yards	182	103
Passing yards	203	407
Turnovers	1	3
Time of possession	28:17	31:43

=== At UCF ===
Houston at Central Florida – Game summary

Quarter	1	2	3	4	Total
Cougars	17	6	0	6	29
Knights	14	7	21	2	44

at Spectrum Stadium, Orlando, FL

- Date: November 2
- Game time: 11:00 a.m. CDT
- Game weather: 81 °F (27 °C); partly cloudy
- Game attendance: 41,361
- Referee: Mike Roche
- TV: ESPN2

Game information

First quarter

- (12:04) HOU TD – Mulbah Car 37-yard rush, Dalton Witherspoon kick
  Houston 7–0; Drive: 6 plays, 75 yards, 2:56
- (05:29) HOU FG – Dalton Witherspoon 45-yard field goal
  Houston 10–0; Drive: 7 plays, 27 yards, 3:40
- (04:07) UCF TD – Marlon Williams 6-yard pass from Dillon Gabriel, Dylan Barnas kick
  Houston 10–7; Drive: 6 plays, 75 yards, 1:22
- (02:13) HOU TD – Mulbah Car 2-yard rush, Dalton Witherspoon kick
  Houston 17–7; Drive: 4 plays, 75 yards, 1:54
- (00:48) UCF TD – Tre Nixon 32-yard pass from Dillon Gabriel, Dylan Barnas kick
  Houston 17–14; Drive: 6 plays, 75 yards, 1:25

Second quarter

- (09:16) UCF TD – Dillon Gabriel 22-yard rush, Dylan Barnas kick
  Central Florida 21–17; Drive: 6 plays, 98 yards, 1:10
- (04:00) HOU FG – Dalton Witherspoon 37-yard field goal
  Central Florida 21–20; Drive: 10 plays, 58 yards, 5:16
- (00:00) HOU FG – Dalton Witherspoon 41-yard field goal
  Houston 23–21; Drive: 7 plays, 43 yards, 2:57

Third quarter

- (10:10) UCF TD – Bentavious Thompson 43-yard rush, Dylan Barnas kick
  Central Florida 28–23; Drive: 3 plays, 50 yards, 0:33
- (05:58) UCF TD – Tre Nixon 34-yard pass from Dillon Gabriel, Dylan Barnas kick
  Central Florida 35–23; Drive: 4 plays, 37 yards, 1:55
- (00:40) UCF TD – Bentavious Thompson 2-yard rush, Dylan Barnas kick
  Central Florida 42–23; Drive: 7 plays, 73 yards, 2:11

Fourth quarter

- (02:52) HOU TD – Jeremy Singleton 8-yard pass from Clayton Tune, two-point pass conversion attempt failed
  Central Florida 42–29; Drive: 7 plays, 19 yards, 2:41
- (01:34) UCF SF – Brendon Hayes Team Safety
  Central Florida 44–29; Drive: 2 plays, -3 yards, 0:08

Top passers

- HOU – Clayton Tune – 18/30, 179 yards, TD, INT
- UCF – Dillon Gabriel – 21/30, 298 yards, 3 TD

Top rushers

- HOU – Mulbah Car – 26 carries, 132 yards, 2 TD
- UCF – Bentavious Thompson – 7 carries, 65 yards, 2 TD

Top receivers

- HOU – Tre'Von Bradley – 4 receptions, 90 yards
- UCF – Tre Nixon – 6 receptions, 123 yards, 2 TD

Statistics	Houston	UCF
First downs	20	16
Total yards	419	468
Rushing yards	240	164
Passing yards	179	304
Turnovers	1	1
Time of possession	41:31	18:29

=== Memphis ===
Memphis at Houston – Game summary

Quarter	1	2	3	4	Total
No. 18 Tigers	7	21	14	3	45
Cougars	17	3	0	7	27

at TDECU Stadium, Houston, TX

- Date: November 16
- Game time: 2:30 p.m. CDT
- Game weather: 62 °F (17 °C); partly cloudy
- Game attendance: 25,149
- Referee: Mike Roche
- TV: ESPN2

Game information

First quarter

- (11:36) HOU TD – Marquez Stevenson 53-yard pass from Clayton Tune, Dalton Witherspoon kick
  Houston 7–0; Drive: 6 plays, 75 yards, 3:24
- (08:03) MEM TD – Kameron Wilson 6-yard pass from Brady White, Riley Patterson kick
  Tied 7–7; Drive: 8 plays, 61 yards, 3:33
- (07:12) HOU TD – Clayton Tune 68-yard rush, Dalton Witherspoon kick
  Houston 14–7; Drive: 2 plays, 75 yards, 0:51
- (02:16) HOU FG – Dalton Witherspoon 38-yard field goal
  Houston 17–7; Drive: 6 plays, 8 yards, 2:28

Second quarter

- (13:43) MEM TD – Damonte Coxie 23-yard pass from Brady White, Riley Patterson kick
  Houston 17–14; Drive: 9 plays, 65 yards, 3:33
- (04:21) HOU FG – Dalton Witherspoon 26-yard field goal
  Houston 20–17; Drive: 17 plays, 61 yards, 9:22
- (03:30) MEM TD – Brady White 14-yard rush, Riley Patterson kick
  Memphis 21–10; Drive: 3 plays, 75 yards, 0:51
- (00:19) MEM TD – Calvin Austin 16-yard pass from Brady White, Riley Patterson kick
  Memphis 28–20; Drive: 11 plays, 98 yards, 2:00

Third quarter

- (04:12) MEM TD – Antonio Gibson 6-yard pass from Brady White, Riley Patterson kick
  Memphis 35–20; Drive: 11 plays, 95 yards, 4:30
- (02:09) MEM TD – Damonte Coxie 28-yard pass from Brady White, Riley Patterson kick
  Memphis 42–20; Drive: 3 plays, 31 yards, 1:22

Fourth quarter

- (11:16) MEM FG – Riley Patterson 35-yard field goal
  Memphis 45–20; Drive: 9 plays, 51 yards, 4:25
- (04:59) HOU TD – Cole McGowan 0-yard return of blocked punt, Dalton Witherspoon kick
  Memphis 45–27; Drive: 6 plays, 19 yards, 3:26

Top passers

- MEM – Brady White – 22/33, 341 yards, 5 TD, INT
- HOU – Clayton Tune – 14/22, 157 yards, TD

Top rushers

- MEM – Kenneth Gainwell – 17 carries, 99 yards
- HOU – Clayton Tune – 10 carries, 65 yards, TD

Top receivers

- MEM – Demante Coxie – 4 receptions, 93 yards, 2 TD
- HOU – Marquez Stevenson – 5 receptions, 89 yards, TD

Statistics	Memphis	Houston
First downs	29	14
Total yards	531	256
Rushing yards	164	99
Passing yards	367	157
Turnovers	1	1
Time of possession	32:30	27:30

=== At Tulsa ===
Houston at Tulsa – Game summary

Quarter	1	2	3	4	Total
Cougars	0	14	3	7	24
Golden Hurricane	7	0	0	7	14

at Skelly Field at H. A. Chapman Stadium, Tulsa, OK

- Date: November 23
- Game time: 6:30 p.m. CDT
- Game weather: 46 °F (8 °C); clear skies
- Game attendance: 16,120
- Referee: Henry Johns
- TV: ESPNU

Game information

First quarter

- (06:02) TUL TD – Sam Crawford Jr. 14-yard from Zach Smith, Jacob Rainey kick
  Tulsa 7–0; Drive: 5 plays, 31 yards, 2:05

Second quarter

- (12:23) HOU TD – Clayton Tune 15-yard rush, Dalton Witherspoon kick
  Tied 7–7; Drive: 4 plays, 35 yards, 1:23
- (01:34) HOU TD – Damarion Williams 25-yard interception returned, Dalton Witherspoon kick
  Houston 14–7; Drive: 2 plays, 9 yards, 0:12

Third quarter

- (09:39) HOU FG – Dalton Witherspoon 23-yard field goal
  Houston 17–7; Drive: 6 plays, 37 yards, 2:57

Fourth quarter

- (13:58) TUL TD – T. K. Wilkerson 1-yard rush, Jacob Rainey kick
  Houston 17–14; Drive: 9 plays, 98 yards, 3:42
- (13:45) HOU TD – Marquez Stevenson 94-yard kickoff return, Dalton Witherspoon kick
  Houston 24–14; Drive: 0 plays, 0 yards, 0:00

Top passers

- HOU – Clayton Tune – 8/12, 89 yards
- TUL – Zach Smith – 29/45, 381 yards, TD, 2 INT

Top rushers

- HOU – Kyle Porter – 14 carries, 57 yards
- TUL – Shamari Brooks – 9 carries, 22 yards

Top receivers

- HOU – Kyle Porter – 3 receptions, 34 yards
- TUL – Keylon Stokes – 9 receptions, 144 yards

Statistics	Houston	Tulsa
First downs	12	18
Total yards	231	380
Rushing yards	131	-1
Passing yards	100	381
Turnovers	1	4
Time of possession	35:42	24:18

=== Navy ===
Navy at Houston – Game summary

Quarter	1	2	3	4	Total
Midshipmen	21	7	14	14	56
Cougars	14	13	7	7	41

at TDECU Stadium, Houston, TX

- Date: November 30
- Game time: 6:00 p.m. CDT
- Game weather: 77 °F (25 °C); partly cloudy
- Game attendance: 22,824
- Referee: Edwin Lee
- TV: ESPN2

Game information

First quarter

- (13:31) HOU TD – Tre'von Bradley 67-yard pass from Clayton Tune, Dalton Witherspoon kick
  Houston 7–0; Drive: 3 plays, 75 yards, 1:29
- (09:21) NAVY TD – Jamale Carothers 8-yard rush, Bijan Nichols kick
  Tied 7–7; Drive: 8 plays, 75 yards, 4:10
- (07:32) NAVY TD – Jamale Carothers 17-yard rush, Bijan Nichols kick
  Navy 14–7; Drive: 4 plays, 28 yards, 1:49
- (02:13) HOU TD – Patrick Carr 5-yard rush, Dalton Witherspoon kick
  Tied 14–14; Drive: 10 plays, 75 yards, 5:19
- (01:34) NAVY TD – Malcolm Perry 15-yard rush, Bijan Nichols kick
  Navy 21–14; Drive: 2 plays, 75 yards, 0:39

Second quarter

- (13:32) HOU TD – Marquez Stevenson 5-yard pass from Clayton Tune, Dalton Witherspoon kick
  Tied 21–21; Drive: 6 plays, 75 yards, 3:02
- (09:38) NAVY TD – CJ Williams 3-yard rush, Bijan Nichols kick
  Navy 28–21; Drive: 3 plays, 3 yards, 1:29
- (06:44) HOU FG – Dalton Witherspoon 27-yard field goal
  Navy 28–24; Drive: 6 plays, 59 yards, 2:54
- (01:04) HOU FG – Dalton Witherspoon 29-yard field goal
  Navy 28–27; Drive: 8 plays, 40 yards, 3:43

Third quarter

- (14:49) NAVY TD – Jamale Carothers 75-yard rush, Bijan Nichols kick
  Navy 35–27; Drive: 1 play, 75 yards, 0:11
- (05:48) HOU TD – Courtney Lark 26-yard pass from Clayton Tune, Dalton Witherspoon kick
  Navy 35–34; Drive: 3 plays, 29 yards, 0:54
- (02:06) NAVY TD – Jamale Carothers 29-yard rush, Bijan Nichols kick
  Navy 42–34; Drive: 7 plays, 75 yards, 3:42

Fourth quarter

- (09:52) NAVY TD – Tyreek King-El 18-yard rush, Bijan Nichols kick
  Navy 49–34; Drive: 8 plays, 80 yards, 4:04
- (05:50) HOU TD – Marquez Stevenson 22-yard pass from Clayton Tune, Dalton Witherspoon kick
  Navy 49–41; Drive: 10 plays, 71 yards, 4:02
- (03:26) NAVY TD – Jamale Carothers 19-yard rush, Bijan Nichols kick
  Navy 56–41; Drive: 5 plays, 78 yards, 2:24

Top passers

- NAVY – Malcolm Perry – 2/4, 107 yards
- HOU – Clayton Tune – 23/35, 393 yards, 4 TD, 4 INT

Top rushers

- NAVY – Jamale Carothers – 18 carries, 188 yards, 5 TD
- HOU – Clayton Tune – 11 carries, 61 yards

Top receivers

- NAVY – Keoni-Kordell Makekau – 1 receptions, 60 yards
- HOU – Marquez Stevenson – 8 receptions, 133 yards, 2 TD

Statistics	Navy	Houston
First downs	20	21
Total yards	554	527
Rushing yards	447	134
Passing yards	107	393
Turnovers	0	5
Time of possession	29:26	30:34

== Players drafted into the NFL ==
Round	Pick	Player	Position	NFL club
3	72	Josh Jones	OT	Arizona Cardinals
