= 2019 UConn Huskies football team =

American college football season

2019 UConn Huskies football
- Conference: American Athletic Conference
- East Division
- Record: 2–10 (0–8 AAC)
- Head coach: Randy Edsall (15th season)
- Offensive coordinator: Frank Giufre (1st season)
- Offensive scheme: Multiple
- Defensive coordinator: Lou Spanos (1st season)
- Base defense: 4–3
- Home stadium: Pratt & Whitney Stadium at Rentschler Field

2019 American Athletic Conference football standings
	Conf.			Overall
Team	W		L	W		L
East Division
No. 21 Cincinnati xy	7	–	1	11	–	3
No. 24 UCF	6	–	2	10	–	3
Temple	5	–	3	8	–	5
South Florida	2	–	6	4	–	8
East Carolina	1	–	7	4	–	8
UConn	0	–	8	2	–	10
West Division
No. 17 Memphis xy$	7	–	1	12	–	2
No. 20 Navy x	7	–	1	11	–	2
SMU	6	–	2	10	–	3
Tulane	3	–	5	7	–	6
Houston	2	–	6	4	–	8
Tulsa	2	–	6	4	–	8
Championship: Memphis 29, Cincinnati 24
$ – Conference champion; x – Division champion/co-champions; y – Championship game participant; Rankings from AP Poll

The 2019 UConn Huskies football team represented the University of Connecticut (UConn) as a member of the American Athletic Conference (AAC) during the 2019 NCAA Division I FBS football season. Led by 15th-year head coach Randy Edsall, the Huskies compiled an overall record of 2–10 with a mark of 0–8 in conference play, placing last out of six teams the AAC's East Division. The team played home games at Pratt & Whitney Stadium at Rentschler Field in East Hartford, Connecticut.

== Schedule ==
UConn's 2019 schedule began with three non-conference games: at home against Wagner of the Northeast Conference, at home against Illinois of the Big Ten Conference, and on the road against Indiana, also of the Big Ten Conference. Their fourth non-conference game came mid-season against rival UMass, a football independent. In American Athletic Conference play, the Huskies played the other members of the East Division and draw Houston, Navy, and Tulane from the West Division. They did not play Memphis, SMU, or Tulsa as part of the regular season.

Date	Time	Opponent	Site	TV	Result	Attendance
August 29	7:00 p.m.	Wagner*	Pratt & Whitney Stadium at Rentschler Field; East Hartford, CT	ESPN3	W 24–21	19,648
September 7	3:30 p.m.	Illinois*	Pratt & Whitney Stadium at Rentschler Field; East Hartford, CT	CBSSN	L 23–31	23,108
September 21	12:00 p.m.	at Indiana*	Memorial Stadium; Bloomington, IN	BTN	L 3–38	40,084
September 28	7:00 p.m.	at No. 22 UCF	Spectrum Stadium; Orlando, FL (Civil Conflict)	ESPN2	L 21–56	44,164
October 5	12:00 p.m.	South Florida	Pratt & Whitney Stadium at Rentschler Field; East Hartford, CT	CBSSN	L 22–48	18,038
October 12	3:45 p.m.	at Tulane	Yulman Stadium; New Orleans, LA	ESPNU	L 7–49	17,040
October 19	12:00 p.m.	Houston^{†}	Pratt & Whitney Stadium at Rentschler Field; East Hartford, CT	ESPNU	L 17–24	19,760
October 26	3:30 p.m.	at UMass*	Warren McGuirk Alumni Stadium; Amherst, MA (rivalry)	NESN, NESNPlus, FloSports	W 56–35	12,234
November 1	8:00 p.m.	Navy	Pratt & Whitney Stadium at Rentschler Field; East Hartford, CT	ESPN2	L 10–56	16,659
November 9	3:30 p.m.	at No. 20 Cincinnati	Nippert Stadium; Cincinnati, OH	CBSSN	L 3–48	38,919
November 23	12:00 p.m.	East Carolina	Pratt & Whitney Stadium at Rentschler Field; East Hartford, CT	ESPN3	L 24–31	12,084
November 30	3:30 p.m.	at Temple	Lincoln Financial Field; Philadelphia, PA	CBSSN	L 17–49	26,083
*Non-conference game; ^{†}Homecoming; Rankings from AP Poll and CFP Rankings after November 5 released prior to game; All times are in Eastern time

== Preseason ==
=== Coaching changes ===
In January 2019, head coach Randy Edsall announced the hiring of Lou Spanos to be the new defensive coordinator, replacing the fired Billy Crocker. Spanos had spent the 2018 season as an analyst at Alabama. In February, offensive coordinator John Dunn unexpectedly left to join the staff of the New York Jets. Offensive line coach Frank Giufre was promoted to become the new offensive coordinator.

=== Personnel changes ===
On July 30, 2019, it was announced that linebacker Eli Thomas was retiring from football after suffering a stroke.

=== AAC media poll ===
The AAC media poll was released on July 16, 2019, with the Huskies predicted to finish sixth in the AAC East Division, receiving all last place votes.

== Game summaries ==
=== Wagner ===
Wagner Seahawks at UConn Huskies – Game summary

Quarter	1	2	3	4	Total
Seahawks	0	0	14	7	21
Huskies	7	3	14	0	24

at Pratt & Whitney Stadium at Rentschler Field • East Hartford, Connecticut

- Date: August 29, 2019
- Game time: 7:04 p.m.
- Game weather: Temperature: 73 °F (23 °C) • Wind: 7 NW • Weather: Clear skies
- Game attendance: 19,648
- Referee: Edwin Lee • Umpire: Hilbert Byers • Linesman: Jeff Priutt • Line Judge: Colin Gaynor • Back Judge: Chris Bikowski • Field Judge: Glen Wilson • Side Judge: Matt Waldron
- TV announcers (ESPN3): Doug Sherman (play-by-play) & Tyoka Jackson (color)
- Box Score

Game information

First Quarter

- UCONN • 04:29 • Mike Beaudry 2 yd run (Clayton Harris kick) • UCONN 7–0

Second Quarter

- UCONN • 08:30 • Clayton Harris 30 yd field goal • UCONN 10–0

Third Quarter

- WAGNER • 07:39 • Myron Morris 71 yd interception return (Eric Silvester kick) • UCONN 10–7
- UCONN • 04:20 • Kevin Mensah 4 yd run (Clayton Harris kick) • UCONN 17–7
- WAGNER • 02:51 • Dymitri McKenzie 55 yd run (Eric Silvester kick) • UCONN 17–14
- UCONN • 00:04 • Art Thompkins 5 yd run (Clayton Harris kick) • UCONN 24–14

Fourth Quarter

- WAGNER • 03:36 • Dymitri McKenzie 7 yd run (Eric Silvester kick) • UCONN 24–21

Top Passers

- WAGNER – Christian Alexander-Stevens – 12/23, 82 yds
- UCONN – Mike Beaudry – 14/21, 158 yds

Top Rushers

- WAGNER – Dymitri McKenzie – 13 attempts, 115 yds, 2 TDs
- UCONN – Kevin Mensah – 36 attempts, 144 yds, 1 TD

Top Receiving

- WAGNER – Adam Giordano – 3 receptions, 24 yds
- UCONN – Matt Drayton – 5 reception, 51 yds

Top Tacklers

- WAGNER – Christopher Williams – 11 tackles
- UCONN – D.J. Morgan – 8 tackles

=== Illinois ===
Illinois Fighting Illini at UConn Huskies – Game summary

Quarter	1	2	3	4	Total
Fighting Illini	0	24	7	0	31
Huskies	10	3	7	3	23

at Pratt & Whitney Stadium at Rentschler Field • East Hartford, Connecticut

- Date: September 7, 2019
- Game time: 3:38 p.m.
- Game weather: Temperature: 76 °F (24 °C) • Wind: 9 NW • Weather: Sunny
- Game attendance: 23,108
- Referee: George Blum • Umpire: Roger Day • Linesman: Brett Bergman • Line Judge: Michael Sharp • Back Judge: Arthur Lucky • Field Judge: Phil Hicks • Side Judge: Rich Fahnestock
- TV announcers (CBSSN): Dave Ryan (play-by-play) & Corey Chavous (color)
- Box Score

Game information

First Quarter

- UCONN • 11:14 • Tyler Coyle 52 yd interception return (Clayton Harris kick) • UCONN 7–0
- UCONN • 03:56 • Clayton Harris 35 yd field goal • UCONN 10–0

Second Quarter

- UCONN • 14:57 • Clayton Harris 29 yd field goal • UCONN 13–0
- ILL • 11:43 • RaVon Bonner 28 yd pass from Brandon Peters (James McCourt kick) • UCONN 13–7
- ILL • 05:51 • Josh Imatorbhebhe 9 yd pass from Brandon Peters (James McCourt kick) • ILL 14–13
- ILL • 00:55 • Daniel Barker 18 yd pass from Brandon Peters (James McCourt kick) • ILL 21–13
- ILL • 00:00 • James McCourt 53 yd field goal • ILL 24–13

Third Quarter

- UCONN • 11:36 • Kevin Mensah 2 yd run (Clayton Harris kick) • ILL 24–20
- ILL • 06:09 • Josh Imatorbhebhe 13 yd pass from Brandon Peters (James McCourt kick) • ILL 31–20

Fourth Quarter

- UCONN • 11:39 • Clayton Harris 33 yd field goal • ILL 31–23

Top Passers

- ILL – Brandon Peters – 24/35, 227 yds, 4 TDs
- UCONN – Jack Zergiotis – 21/31, 275 yds

Top Rushers

- ILL – Jakari Norwood – 6 attempts, 62 yds
- UCONN – Kevin Mensah – 14 attempts, 27 yds, 1 TD

Top Receiving

- ILL – Ricky Smalling – 7 receptions, 56 yds
- UCONN – Cameron Ross – 4 reception, 85 yds

Top Tacklers

- ILL – Nate Hobbs – 8 tackles
- UCONN – D.J. Morgan – 11 tackles

=== Indiana ===
UConn Huskies at Indiana Hoosiers – Game summary

Quarter	1	2	3	4	Total
Huskies	3	0	0	0	3
Hoosiers	7	10	14	7	38

at Memorial Stadium • Bloomington, Indiana

- Date: September 21, 2019
- Game time: 12:01 p.m.
- Game weather: Temperature: 79 °F (26 °C) • Wind: 8 SSW • Weather: Partly Sunny
- Game attendance: 40,084
- Referee: Daniel Capron • Umpire: Ed Feaster • Linesman: Sergio DeHoyos • Line Judge: John Wiercinski • Back Judge: Kevin Schwartze • Field Judge: Matt Kukar • Side Judge: Bobby Sagers
- TV announcers (BTN): Lisa Byington (play-by-play) & Jeremy Leman (color)
- Box Score

Game information

First Quarter

- UCONN • 11:24 • Clayton Harris 41 yd field goal • UCONN 3–0
- IND • 05:01 • Whop Philyor 12 yd pass from Peyton Ramsey (Logan Justus kick) • IND 7–3

Second Quarter

- IND • 13:35 • Logan Justus 27 yd field goal • IND 10–3
- IND • 01:42 • Peyton Hendershot 4 yd pass from Peyton Ramsey (Logan Justus kick) • IND 17–3

Third Quarter

- IND • 12:50 • Cam Jones 44 yd interception return (Logan Justus kick) • IND 24–3
- IND • 04:37 • Nick Westbrook 16 yd pass from Peyton Ramsey (Logan Justus kick) • IND 31–3

Fourth Quarter

- IND • 08:47 • Stevie Scott 6 yd run (Logan Justus kick) • IND 38–3
- IND – Peyton Ramsey – 23/27, 247 yds, 3 TDs
- UCONN – Jack Zergiotis – 14/28, 90 yds

Top Rushers

- IND – Stevie Scott – 21 attempts, 97 yds, 1 TD
- UCONN – Kevin Mensah – 10 attempts, 34 yds

Top Receiving

- IND – Whop Philyor – 4 receptions, 47 yds, 1 TD
- UCONN – Cameron Ross – 3 reception, 30 yds

Top Tacklers

- IND – Jamar Johnson – 6 tackles
- UCONN – Omar Fortt – 8 tackles

=== UCF ===
UConn Huskies at UCF Knights – Game summary

Quarter	1	2	3	4	Total
Huskies	0	0	7	14	21
No. 22 Knights	28	14	14	0	56

at Spectrum Stadium • Orlando, Florida

- Date: September 28, 2019
- Game time: 7:05 p.m.
- Game weather: Temperature: 83 °F (28 °C) • Wind: 13 ENE • Weather: Partly cloudy
- Game attendance: 44,164
- Referee: A. Calabrese • Umpire: J. Akers • Linesman: B. Ballester • Line Judge: D. Bush • Back Judge: J. Sima • Field Judge: J. Reif • Side Judge: W. Lug
- TV announcers (ESPN2): Roy Philpott (play-by-play), Kelly Stouffer (color) & Lauren Sisler (sideline)
- Box Score

Game information

First Quarter

- UCF • 12:44 • Greg McCrae 1 yd run (Dylan Barnas kick) • UCF 7–0
- UCF • 07:21 • Gabriel Davis 73 yd pass from Dillon Gabriel (Dylan Barnas kick) • UCF 14–0
- UCF • 03:17 • Nevelle Clarke 48 yd interception return (Dylan Barnas kick) • UCF 21–0
- UCF • 01:06 • Adrian Killins 75 yd run (Dylan Barnas kick) • UCF 28–0

Second Quarter

- UCF • 11:04 • Gabriel Davis 16 yd pass from Dillon Gabriel (Dylan Barnas kick) • UCF 35–0
- UCF • 10:06 • Gabriel Davis 13 yd pass from Dillon Gabriel (Dylan Barnas kick) • UCF 42–0

Third Quarter

- UCF • 12:37 • M Williams 21 yd pass from Darriel Mack (Dylan Barnas kick) • UCF 49–0
- UCF • 05:48 • Ben Thompson 2 yd run (Daniel Obarski kick) • UCF 56–0
- UCONN • 01:30 • Cameron Ross 16 yd pass from Steven Karjewski (Clayton Harris kick) • UCF 56–7

Fourth Quarter

- UCONN • 10:36 • Ardell Brown 12 yd pass from Steven Karjewski (Clayton Harris kick) • UCF 56–14
- UCONN • 00:19 • Matt Drayton 15 yd pass from Steven Karjewski (Clayton Harris kick) • UCF 56–21
- UCF – Dillon Gabriel – 11/16, 281 yds, 3 TDs
- UCONN – Steven Krajewski – 22/33, 273 yds, 3 TDs

Top Rushers

- UCF – Adrian Killins – 3 attempts, 77 yds, 1 TD
- UCONN – Kevin Mensah – 23 attempts, 123 yds

Top Receiving

- UCF – Gabriel Davis – 5 receptions, 119 yds, 3 TDs
- UCONN – Cameron Ross – 6 reception, 91 yds, 1 TD

Top Tacklers

- UCF – Derek Gainous – 8 tackles
- UCONN – Tyler Coyle – 9 tackles

=== South Florida ===
South Florida Bulls at UConn Huskies – Game summary

Quarter	1	2	3	4	Total
Bulls	7	20	7	14	48
Huskies	0	14	0	8	22

at Pratt & Whitney Stadium at Rentschler Field • East Hartford, Connecticut

- Date: October 5, 2019
- Game time: 12:00 p.m.
- Game weather: 53 °F (12 °C) • Wind: 8 N • Weather: Crisp
- Game attendance: 18,038
- Referee: C. Lamertina • Umpire: M. Powell • Linesman: Jim Casey • Line Judge: Stephen Ray • Back Judge: Jerry Walter • Field Judge: Rick Santilli • Side Judge: Matt Hill
- TV announcers (CBSSN): Rich Waltz (play-by-play) & Aaron Murray (color)
- Box Score

Game information

First Quarter

- USF • 03:22 • Bryce Miller 12 yd pass from Jordan McCloud (Coby Weiss kick) • USF 7–0

Second Quarter

- USF • 11:46 • Trevon Sands 5 yd run (Coby Weiss kick) • USF 14–0
- UCONN • 06:14 • Elija Jeffreys 25 yd pass from Mike Beaudry (Clayton Harris kick) • USF 14–7
- USF • 04:39 • R St. Felix 13 yd pass from Jordan McCloud (Coby Weiss kick blocked) • USF 20–7
- UCONN • 02:45 • Kevin Mensah 18 yd run (Clayton Harris kick) • USF 20–14
- USF • 01:47 • Jordan McCloud 27 yd run (Coby Weiss kick) • USF 27–14

Third Quarter

- USF • 05:01 • Bryce Miller 12 yd pass from Jordan McCloud (Coby Weiss kick) • USF 34–14

Fourth Quarter

- USF • 09:07 • Spencer Shrader 22 yd run (Coby Weiss kick) • USF 41–14
- UCONN • 01:59 • Kevin Mensah 3 yd run (Mike Beaudry rush) • USF 41–22
- USF • 00:31 • DeVontre Dukes 33 yd pass from Kirk Rygol (Coby Weiss kick) • USF 48–22

Top Passers

- USF – Jordan McCloud – 11/21, 157 yds, 3 TDs
- UCONN – Mike Beaudry – 18/29, 209 yds, 1 TD

Top Rushers

- USF – Jordan Cronkrite – 20 attempts, 148 yds
- UCONN – Kevin Mensah – 21 attempts, 70 yds, 2 TDs

Top Receiving

- USF – Jacob Mathis – 2 receptions, 43 yds
- UCONN – Cameron Ross – 7 reception, 68 yds

Top Tacklers

- USF – Dwayne Boyles – 8 tackles
- UCONN – Tyler Coyle – 9 tackles

=== Tulane ===
UConn Huskies at Tulane Green Wave – Game summary

Quarter	1	2	3	4	Total
Huskies	0	0	0	7	7
Green Wave	14	14	14	7	49

at Yulman Stadium • New Orleans, Louisiana

- Date: October 12, 2019
- Game time: 3:47 p.m.
- Game weather: 73 °F (23 °C) • Wind: 9 N • Weather: Cloudy
- Game attendance: 17,040
- Referee: Henry Johns • Umpire: Bill Lamkin • Linesman: Todd Riddick • Line Judge: Tracy Jones • Back Judge: Peter Buchanan • Field Judge: Glenn Crowther • Side Judge: Eric Hartman
- TV announcers (ESPNU): Kevin Brown (play-by-play) Andre Ware (color)
- Box Score

Game information

First Quarter

- TULN • 08:51 • Corey Dauphine 57 yd run (Merek Glover kick) • TULN 7–0
- TULN • 03:55 • Darnell Mooney 22 yd pass from Justin McMillan (M Glover kick) • TULN 14–0

Second Quarter

- TULN • 10:57 • Macon Clark 20 yd interception return (Merek Glover kick) • TULN 21–0
- TULN • 05:40 • Justin McMillan 14 yd run (Merek Glover kick) • TULN 28–0

Third Quarter

- TULN • 07:22 • Cameron Carroll 2 yd pass from J McMillan (Merek Glover kick) • TULN 35–0
- TULN • 03:07 • Keon Howard 9 yd run (Merek Glover kick) • TULN 42–0

Fourth Quarter

- TULN • 06:43 • Jha'Quan Jackson 14 yd pass from Keon Howard (Sterling Stockwell kick) • TULN 49–0
- UCONN • 02:27 • Cameron Hairston 16 yd pass from Jack Zergiotis (Clayton Harris kick) • TULN 49–7

Top Passers

- TULN – Justin McMillan – 18/24, 231 yds, 2 TDs
- UCONN – Mike Beaudry – 15/24, 101 yds

Top Rushers

- TULN – Corey Dauphine – 5 attempts, 87 yds, 1 TD
- UCONN – Kevin Mensah – 15 attempts, 41 yds

Top Receiving

- TULN – Darnell Mooney – 4 receptions, 77 yds, 1 TD
- UCONN – Jayce Medlock – 3 reception, 42 yds

Top Tacklers

- TULN – P.J. Hall – 7 tackles
- UCONN – Jackson Mitchell – 8 tackles

=== Houston ===
Houston Cougars at UConn Huskies – Game summary

Quarter	1	2	3	4	Total
Cougars	3	7	7	7	24
Huskies	0	7	3	7	17

at Pratt & Whitney Stadium at Rentschler Field • East Hartford, Connecticut

- Date: October 19, 2019
- Game time: 12:00 p.m.
- Game weather: 50 °F (10 °C) • Wind: 0 • Weather: Brisk
- Game attendance: 19,760
- Referee: Adam Savoie • Umpire: William Thomas • Linesman: Dan Harrington • Line Judge: James Bryant • Back Judge: Mark Windham • Field Judge: Ryan Robinson • Side Judge: Chris Bikowski
- TV announcers (ESPNU): Mike Corey (play-by-play) & Rene Ingoglia (color)
- Box Score

Game information

First Quarter

- HOU • 09:44 • Dalton Witherspoon 42 yd field goal • HOU 3–0

Second Quarter

- UCONN • 13:41 • Matt Drayton 17 yd pass from Jack Zergiotis (Clayton Harris kick) • UCONN 7–3
- HOU • 04:23 • Kyle Porter 12 yd run (Dalton Witherspoon kick) • HOU 10–7

Third Quarter

- UCONN • 04:48 • Clayton Harris 43 yd field goal • TIED 10–10
- HOU • 03:31 • Jeremy Singleton 58 yd pass from Logan Holgorsen (Dalton Witherspoon kick) • HOU 17–10

Fourth Quarter

- HOU • 03:19 • Bryson Smith 2 yd run (Dalton Witherspoon kick) • HOU 24–10
- UCONN • 01:40 • Art Thompkins 7 yd pass from Jack Zergiotis (Clayton Harris kick) • UCONN 24–17

Top Passers

- HOU – Logan Holgorsen – 7/15, 123 yds, 1 TD
- UCONN – Jack Zergiotis – 27/44, 270 yds, 2 TDs

Top Rushers

- HOU – Kyle Porter – 18 attempts, 68 yds, 1 TD
- UCONN – Kevin Mensah – 12 attempts, 93 yds

Top Receiving

- HOU – Jeremy Singleton – 2 receptions, 103 yds, 1 TD
- UCONN – Cameron Ross – 9 reception, 75 yds

Top Tacklers

- HOU – Grant Stuard – 15 tackles
- UCONN – Omar Fortt – 11 tackles

=== UMass ===
UConn Huskies at UMass Minutemen – Game summary

Quarter	1	2	3	4	Total
Huskies	14	21	7	14	56
Minutemen	7	14	7	7	35

at Warren McGuirk Alumni Stadium • Hadley, Massachusetts

- Date: October 26, 2019
- Game time: 3:35 p.m.
- Game weather: 58 °F (14 °C) • Wind: 6 NNE • Weather: Partly Cloudy
- Game attendance: 12,234
- Referee: Edwin Lee • Umpire: Hilbert Byers • Linesman: Jeff Pruitt • Line Judge: Colin Gaynor • Back Judge: Victor Firth • Field Judge: Glen Wilson • Side Judge: Matt Waldron
- TV announcers (NESN/FloSports): Mike Crispino (play-by-play), Wayne Norman (color analyst) & Adam Giardino (sideline)
- Box Score

Game information

First Quarter

- UCONN • 09:54 • Kevin Mensah 17 yd run (Clayton Harris kick) • UCONN 7–0
- UMASS • 04:31 • Bilal Ally 1 yd run (Cooper Garcia kick) • TIED 7–7
- UCONN • 01:39 • Kevin Mensah 2 yd run (Clayton Harris kick) • UCONN 14–7

Second Quarter

- UMASS • 14:53 • J Johnson 40 yd pass from Andrew Brito (Cooper Garcia kick) • TIED 14–14
- UCONN • 13:07 • Art Thompkins 25 yd run (Clayton Harris kick) • UCONN 21–14
- UCONN • 08:23 • Kevin Mensah 5 yd run (Clayton Harris kick) • UCONN 28–14
- UCONN • 05:41 • Cameron Ross 57 yd pass from Jack Zergiotis (Clayton Harris kick) • UCONN 35–14
- UMASS • 01:04 • Samuel Emilus 14 yd pass from Andrew Brito (Cooper Garcia kick) • UCONN 35–21

Third Quarter

- UMASS • 11:25 • Bilal Ally 1 yd run (Cooper Garcia kick) • UCONN 35–28
- UCONN • 07:49 • Jay Rose 15 yd pass from Quayvon Skanes (Clayton Harris kick) • UCONN 42–28

Fourth Quarter

- UCONN • 14:11 • Kevin Mensah 14 yd run (Clayton Harris kick) • UCONN 49–28
- UCONN • 08:26 • Kevin Mensah 3 yd run (Clayton Harris kick) • UCONN 56–28
- UMASS • 00:52 • G Torres 19 yd run (Cooper Garcia kick) • UCONN 56–35

Top Passers

- UMASS – Andrew Brito – 20/40, 239 yds, 2 TDs
- UCONN – Jack Zergiotis – 18/27, 198 yds, 1 TD

Top Rushers

- UMASS – Bilal Ally – 25 attempts, 159 yds, 2 TDs
- UCONN – Kevin Mensah – 19 attempts, 164 yds, 5 TDs

Top Receiving

- UMASS – J Johnson – 4 receptions, 92 yds, 1 TD
- UCONN – Cameron Ross – 9 reception, 120 yds, 1 TD

Top Tacklers

- UMASS – Jarvis Miller – 10 tackles
- UCONN – Jackson Mitchell – 13 tackles

=== Navy ===
Navy Midshipmen at UConn Huskies – Game summary

Quarter	1	2	3	4	Total
Midshipmen	14	14	14	14	56
Huskies	7	3	0	0	10

at Pratt & Whitney Stadium at Rentschler Field • East Hartford, Connecticut

- Date: November 1, 2019
- Game weather: 41 °F (5 °C) • Wind: 11 NW • Weather: Husky
- Game attendance: 16,659
- Referee: A. Calabrese • Umpire: Jeff Akers • Linesman: Baron Ballester • Line Judge: Dan Bush • Back Judge: James Sima • Field Judge: Jame Reif • Side Judge: William Lug
- TV announcers (ESPN2): Dave LaMont (play-by-play), Jim L. Mora (color analyst) & Paul Carcaterra (sideline)
- Box Score

Game information

First Quarter

- NAVY • 11:34 • Malcolm Perry 58 yd run (Bijan Nichols kick) • NAVY 7–0
- UCONN • 08:44 • Art Thompkins 10 yd pass from Jack Zergiotis (Clayton Harris kick) • TIED 7–7
- NAVY • 02:27 • Jamale Carothers 13 yd run (Bijan Nichols kick) • NAVY 14–7

Second Quarter

- UCONN • 13:31 • Clayton Harris 40 yd field goal • NAVY 14–10
- NAVY • 08:31 • Nelson Smith 1 yd run (Bijan Nichols kick) • NAVY 21–10
- NAVY • 04:49 • Mychal Cooper 58 yd pass from Malcolm Perry (Bijan Nichols kick) • NAVY 28–10

Third Quarter

- NAVY • 10:04 • Malcolm Perry 2 yd run (Bijan Nichols kick) • NAVY 35–10
- NAVY • 05:13 • Jamale Carothers 23 yd run (Bijan Nichols kick) • NAVY 42–10

Fourth Quarter

- NAVY • 13:51 • Jamale Carothers 6 yd run (Bijan Nichols kick) • NAVY 49–10
- NAVY • 03:16 • Perry Olsen 1 yd run (Bijan Nichols kick) • NAVY 56–10

Top Passers

- NAVY – Malcolm Perry – 3/6, 165 yds, 1 TD
- UCONN – Jack Zergiotis – 16/34, 205 yds, 1 TD

Top Rushers

- NAVY – Malcolm Perry – 11 attempts, 108 yds, 2 TDs
- UCONN – Kevin Mensah – 26 attempts, 107 yds

Top Receiving

- NAVY – Ryan Mitchell – 1 receptions, 74 yds
- UCONN – Cameron Hairston – 1 reception, 53 yds

Top Tacklers

- NAVY – Kevin Brennan – 12 tackles
- UCONN – Tyler Coyle – 19 tackles

=== Cincinnati ===
UConn Huskies at Cincinnati Bearcats – Game summary

Quarter	1	2	3	4	Total
Huskies	0	0	0	3	3
No. 17 Bearcats	14	24	3	7	48

at Nippert Stadium • Cincinnati, Ohio

- Date: November 9, 2019
- Game time: 3:32 p.m.
- Game weather: 45 °F (7 °C) • Wind: 1 NNW • Weather: Sunny
- Game attendance: 38,919
- Referee: Adam Savoie • Umpire: William Thomas • Linesman: Dan Harrington • Line Judge: Colin Gaynor • Back Judge: Chris Bikowski • Field Judge: Mark Windham • Side Judge: Ryan Robinson
- TV announcers (CBSSN): Rich Waltz (play-by-play) & Aaron Murray (color analyst)
- Box Score

Game information

First Quarter

- CINCI • 11:31 • Josiah Deguara 18 yd pass from Desmond Ridder (Sam Crosa kick) • CINCI 7–0
- CINCI • 05:55 • Michael Warren 6 yd run (Sam Crosa kick) • CINCI 14–0

Second Quarter

- CINCI • 14:49 • Cole Smith 45 yd field goal • CINCI 17–0
- CINCI • 05:59 • Michael Warren 1 yd run (Sam Crosa kick) • CINCI 24–0
- CINCI • 02:35 • Gerrid Doaks 1 yd run (Sam Crosa kick) • CINCI 31–0
- CINCI • 00:06 • Josiah Deguara 15 yd pass from Desmond Ridder (Sam Crosa kick) • CINCI 38–0

Third Quarter

- CINCI • 10:53 • Sam Crosa 32 yd field goal • CINCI 41–0

Fourth Quarter

- CINCI • 14:53 • Ryan Montgomery 2 yd run (Sam Crosa kick) • CINCI 48–0
- UCONN • 05:37 • Clayton Harris 32 yd field goal • CINCI 48–3

Top Passers

- CINCI – Desmond Ridder – 13/23, 136 yds, 2 TDs
- UCONN – Jack Zergiotis – 4/14, 35 yds

Top Rushers

- CINCI – Gerrid Doaks – 13 attempts, 123 yds, 1 TD
- UCONN – Kevin Mensah – 24 attempts, 115 yds

Top Receiving

- CINCI – Malick Mbodj – 4 receptions, 45 yds
- UCONN – Ardell Brown – 3 reception, 29 yds

Top Tacklers

- CINCI – Bryan Wright – 11 tackles
- UCONN – Tyler Coyle – 14 tackles

=== East Carolina ===
East Carolina Pirates at UConn Huskies – Game summary

Quarter	1	2	3	4	Total
Pirates	10	7	7	7	31
Huskies	7	0	7	10	24

at Pratt & Whitney Stadium at Rentschler Field • East Hartford, Connecticut

- Date: November 23, 2019
- Game time: 12:00 p.m.
- Game weather: 40 °F (4 °C) • Wind: 9 W • Weather: Gorgeous Fall Day
- Game attendance: 12,084
- Referee: Edwin Lee • Umpire: Hilbert Byers • Linesman: Jeff Pruitt • Line Judge: James Bryant • Back Judge: William Lug • Field Judge: Glen Wilson • Side Judge: Byron Adams
- TV announcers (ESPN3): Robert Lee (play-by-play) & Matt Chatham (color analyst)
- Box Score

Game information

First Quarter

- UCONN • 13:07 • Cameron Ross 40 yd pass from Jack Zergiotis (Clayton Harris kick) • UCONN 7–0
- ECU • 05:57 • Jake Verity 26 yd field goal • UCONN 7–3
- ECU • 01:11 • Darius Pinnix 3 yd run (Jake Verity kick) • ECU 10–7

Second Quarter

- ECU • 01:49 • Zech Byrd 17 yd pass from Holton Ahlers (Jake Verity kick) • ECU 17–7

Third Quarter

- UCONN • 13:09 • Jay Rose 20 yd pass from Jack Zergiotis (Clayton Harris kick) • ECU 17–14
- ECU • 10:31 • Darius Pinnix 1 yd run (Jake Verity kick) • ECU 24–14

Fourth Quarter

- UCONN • 14:33 • Clayton Harris 27 yd field goal • ECU 24–17
- UCONN • 09:28 • Cameron Ross 94 yd pass from Jack Zergiotis (Clayton Harris kick) • TIED 24–24
- ECU • 03:28 • Holton Ahlers 2 yd run (Jake Verity kick) • ECU 31–24

Top Passers

- ECU – Holton Ahlers – 34/50, 374 yds, 1 TD
- UCONN – Jack Zergiotis – 21/37, 418 yds, 3 TDs

Top Rushers

- ECU – Darius Pinnix – 27 attempts, 105 yds, 2 TDs
- UCONN – Kevin Mensah – 20 attempts, 75 yds

Top Receiving

- ECU – Tyler Snead – 16 receptions, 126 yds
- UCONN – Cameron Ross – 8 receptions, 169 yds, 2 TDs

Top Tacklers

- ECU – Xavier Smith – 8 tackles
- UCONN – Jackson Mitchell – 15 tackles

=== Temple ===
UConn Huskies at Temple Owls – Game summary

Quarter	1	2	3	4	Total
Huskies	14	3	0	0	17
Owls	7	7	28	7	49

at Lincoln Financial Field • Philadelphia, Pennsylvania

- Date: November 30, 2019
- Game time: 3:35 p.m.
- Game weather: 44 °F (7 °C) • Wind: 4 N • Weather: Partly Sunny
- Game attendance: 26,083
- Referee: Hank Johns • Umpire: Michael Prowell • Linesman: Baron Ballester • Line Judge: James Bryant • Back Judge: Peter Buchanan • Field Judge: Mark Windham • Side Judge: Ryan Robinson
- TV announcers (CBSSN): John Sadak (play-by-play) & Malik Zaire (color analyst)
- Box Score

Game information

First Quarter

- UCONN • 13:07 • Ardell Brown 51 yd pass from Jack Zergiotis (Clayton Harris kick) • UCONN 7–0
- UCONN • 07:31 • Steven Krajewski 2 yd run (Clayton Harris kick) • UCONN 14–0
- TEM • 06:19 • Branden Mack 63 yd pass from Anthony Russo (Will Mobley kick) • UCONN 14–7

Second Quarter

- UCONN • 11:00 • Clayton Harris 40 yd field goal • UCONN 17–7
- TEM • 03:23 • Jadan Blue 10 yd pass from Todd Centeio (Will Mobley kick) • UCONN 17–14

Third Quarter

- TEM • 13:20 • Branden Mack 41 yd pass from Anthony Russo (Will Mobley kick) • TEM 21–17
- TEM • 09:04 • Anthony Russo 8 yd run (Will Mobley kick) • TEM 28–17
- TEM • 06:05 • Re'Mahn Davis 55 yd run (Will Mobley kick) • TEM 35–17
- TEM • 05:24 • Sam Franklin 29 yd interception return (Will Mobley kick) • TEM 42–17

Fourth Quarter

- TEM • 02:13 • Tayvon Ruley 6 yd run (Will Mobley kick) • TEM 49–17

Top Passers

- TEM – Anthony Russo – 14/23, 247 yds, 2 TDs
- UCONN – Jack Zergiotis – 24/35, 250 yds, 1 TD

Top Rushers

- TEM – Re'Mahn Davis – 17 attempts, 105 yds, 1 TD
- UCONN – Kevin Mensah – 6 attempts, 20 yds

Top Receiving

- TEM – Branden Mack – 5 receptions, 171 yds, 2 TDs
- UCONN – Ardell Brown – 3 reception, 85 yds, 1 TD

Top Tacklers

- TEM – Sam Franklin – 8 tackles
- UCONN – Robert King – 10 tackles

== Roster ==
2019 Connecticut Huskies football team roster
Players
Coaches
Offense

Pos.	#	Name	Class
RB	1	Art Thompkins	GS
WR	3	Garrison Burnett	So
QB	4	Steven Krajewski	Fr
WR	6	Kevens Clercius	Fr
QB	7	Micah Leon	So
WR	9	Cameron Ross	Fr
RB	10	Zavier Scott	So
QB	11	Jack Zergiotis	Fr
QB	12	Mike Beaudry	GS
WR	15	Donovan Williams	Sr
WR	19	Quayvon Skanes	Jr
RB	26	Stanley Little	Sr
RB	28	Dante Black	Fr
RB	30	Donevan O'Reilly	Sr
RB	34	Kevin Mensah	Jr
RB	35	Dominico Moncion	So
RB	36	Khyon Gillespie	Fr
RB	38	Lavarey Banton	Fr
TE	40	Jayce Medlock	Fr
OL	50	Dylan Niedrowski	Fr
OL	51	Peter Rooney Jr.	Fr
OL	53	Brian Keating	Jr
OL	54	Robert Holmes	So
OL	55	Stanley Hubbard III	So
OL	56	Nino Leone	Jr
OL	60	Ben Bonvicini	Jr
OL	61	Douglas Wardlaw	So
OL	62	Noel Ofori-Nyadu	Fr
OL	64	Christian Haynes	Fr
OL	65	Matt Peart	Sr
OL	70	Cam DeGeorge	Jr
OL	71	James Tunstall	So
OL	72	Rayonte Brown	Fr
OL	73	Brendan Casey	Fr
OL	74	Ryan Van Demark	Jr
OL	75	Chase Lundt	Fr
OL	79	Noel Brouse	Jr
WR	80	Heron Maurisseau	Fr
WR	82	Mason Donaldson	Jr
WR	83	Ardell Brown	GS
WR	84	Elijah Jeffreys	Fr
WR	85	Justin Morehead	Jr
WR	87	Cameron Hairston	So
WR	88	Matt Drayton	Fr
WR	89	Michael Freeman	Sr
TE	91	Jay Rose	Jr

Defense

Pos.	#	Name	Class
DB	2	Myles Bell	Fr
LB	5	Terrence Ganyi	Fr
LB	6	Eddie Hahn	Jr
DB	8	Jalon Ferrell	Fr
DB	13	Messiah Turner	So
DB	14	Tahj Herring-Wilson	Jr
DB	16	Malik Banks	Fr
DB	17	Oneil Robinson	So
DB	18	Abiola Olaniyan	So
DB	20	Robert King III	So
DB	21	Jeremy Lucien	So
LB	22	Eli Thomas (injured)	Sr
DB	24	Keyshawn Paul	So
DB	25	Tyler Coyle	Jr
LB	27	Omar Fortt	Jr
LB	29	Jordan Morrison	Fr
DB	31	Malik Dixon	Fr
DB	32	Shamel Lazarus	Fr
LB	33	Hunter Webb	Fr
DB	37	Kyle Williams	Sr
DB	38	Winston Jules	Fr
DB	39	Ryan Carroll	So
LB	41	D.J. Morgan	GS
LB	42	T.J. Gardner	So
LB	43	Jackson Mitchell	Fr
DB	44	Ian Swenson	So
LB	45	Ryan Gilmartin	Jr
DL	46	AJ Garson	Jr
LB	47	Justin Bryant	Fr
LB	47	Ventine Richardson	Fr
LB	48	Kevon Jones	So
LB	49	Rhakim Williams	Jr
DL	52	Caleb Thomas	So
DL	57	Travis Jones	So
LB	58	Dillon Harris	Jr
DL	59	Andrew Migliaccio	Jr
DL	68	Justin Moore	Fr
DL	69	Ryan Fines	GS
DL	93	Pierce DeVaughn	Fr
DL	95	Eric Watts	Fr
DE	96	Dalmont Gourdine	Fr
DL	97	Jonathan Pace	So
DL	98	Lwal Uguak	So
DL	99	Jeff Woods	Fr

Special teams

Pos.	#	Name	Class
K	49	Clayton Harris	Fr
LS	66	Jeffrey Sidebotham	Jr
P	81	Brett Graham	Jr
K	92	Noah Iden	Fr
P	99	Luke Magliozzi	So

Head coach

- Randy Edsall

Coordinators/assistant coaches

- Frank Giufre
  Offensive coordinator/offensive line
- Lou Spanos
  Defensive coordinator
- Kyle Weiss
  Running backs
- Corey Edsall
  Tight ends
- Darrell Perkins
  Defensive backs
- Dennis Dottin-Carter
  Defensive line
- Aaron Smith
  Wide receivers
- Mike Moyseenko
  Quarterbacks
- Eddie Allen
  Special teams coordinator
- Jarren Horton
  Star, nickel, dime

Legend

- (C) Team captain
- (S) Suspended
- (I) Ineligible
- Injured
- Redshirt

Roster
Last update: June 12, 2019

== Players drafted into the NFL ==
Round	Pick	Player	Position	NFL club
3	99	Matt Peart	Offensive tackle	New York Giants
