= Michael Beaudry =

Canadian football coach (born 1997)

Current position
- Title: Defensive quality control coach
- Team: Cincinnati
- Conference: Big 12

Biographical details
- Born: July 13, 1997 (age 29); Regina, Saskatchewan, Canada

Playing career
- 2015–2018: West Florida
- 2019: UConn
- 2020–2021: Idaho
- 2022: Edmonton Elks
- Position: Quarterback/Fullback

Coaching career (HC unless noted)
- 2023: West Florida (OA)
- 2024: Benedict (QB)
- 2025: Army (Analyst)
- 2026–present: Cincinnati (DQC)

Michael Beaudry (born July 13, 1997) is a Canadian football coach who is a defensive quality control coach for the Cincinnati Bearcats. He played college football for the West Florida Argonauts, UConn Huskies, and Idaho Vandals and professionally for the Edmonton Elks of the Canadian Football League (CFL).

== Early life ==
Beaudry was born and grew up in Regina, Saskatchewan, until his family moved to Oviedo, Florida, when he was eleven years old. He attended Paul J. Hagerty High School and was named All-Seminole County Athletic Conference as a senior. Beaudry committed to play college football West Florida, which had just formed a team, and was the first recruit to sign a National Letter of Intent with the program.

== College career ==
=== West Florida ===
Beaudry began his college career at West Florida (UWF) as part of the Argonauts' inaugural roster. He broke his fibula during spring practices before UWF's first season. Beaudry was named the Argonauts starting quarterback going into his redshirt freshman season. He was named the Gulf South Conference Offensive Freshman of the Year after passing for 3,215 yards and 29 touchdowns as UWF advanced to the NCAA Division II Football Championship game. Beaudry suffered a season-ending injury during the first quarter of West Florida's season opener in 2018. Following the end of the season he entered the NCAA transfer portal.

=== UConn ===
Beaudry ultimately transferred to UConn. He was named the Huskies starting quarterback going into the 2019 season. Beaudry played in five games before suffering an injury and completed 53-of-83 pass attempts for 503 yards and one touchdown with two interceptions.

=== Idaho ===
After one season at UConn, Beaudry transferred a second time to Idaho as a graduate transfer. He started all four of the Vandals' games during his first season with the team, which was played in the spring after being postponed due to COVID-19. Beaudry finished the season with 73 completions on 122 pass attempts for 794 yards with three touchdowns and three interceptions while also rushing 25 times for 97 yards and one touchdown. He decided to utilize the extra year of eligibility granted to college athletes who played in the 2020 season due to the coronavirus pandemic and return to Idaho for a second season. Beaudry played in seven games with six starts in 2021 and passed 1,299 yards with four touchdowns and six interceptions.

=== Statistics ===
Year	Team	Games		Passing								Rushing			
Year	Team	GP	Record	Comp	Att	Pct	Yards	Avg	TD	Int	Rate	Att	Yards	Avg	TD
2015	West Florida	DNP													
2016	West Florida	DNP													
2017	West Florida	14	11−4	266	483	55.1	3,215	6.7	29	13	125.4	79	96	1.2	2
2018	West Florida	1	0−0	2	6	33.3	9	1.5	0	0	45.9	1	4	4.0	0
2019	UConn	6	1−2	53	83	63.9	503	6.1	1	2	113.9	21	-32	-1.5	1
2020–21	Idaho	4	1−2	73	123	59.3	794	6.5	3	3	116.7	25	97	3.9	1
2021	Idaho	7	2−4	115	179	64.2	1,299	7.3	4	6	125.9	27	68	2.5	0
Career		32	19−12	509	874	58.2	5,820	6.7	37	24	122.7	153	233	1.5	4

== Professional career ==
Beaudry was signed by Edmonton Elks of the Canadian Football League on April 12, 2022. He dressed in ten regular season games, but did not record a pass though he contributed as a fullback and took reps on special teams. At the conclusion of 2023 training camp, Beaudry was part of the final cuts on June 2, 2023.

== Coaching career ==
After his release from the Elks, Beaudry returned to West Florida as an offensive assistant on the Argonauts' coaching staff for the 2023 season. After one year, he was hired as the quarterbacks coach at Benedict College. Beaudry left Benedict in 2025 to become a defensive analyst at Army. He was hired as an assistant safeties coach for the Cincinnati Bearcats the following year by former Army defensive coordinator Nate Woody.
