= Marquez Stevenson =

American football player (born 1998)

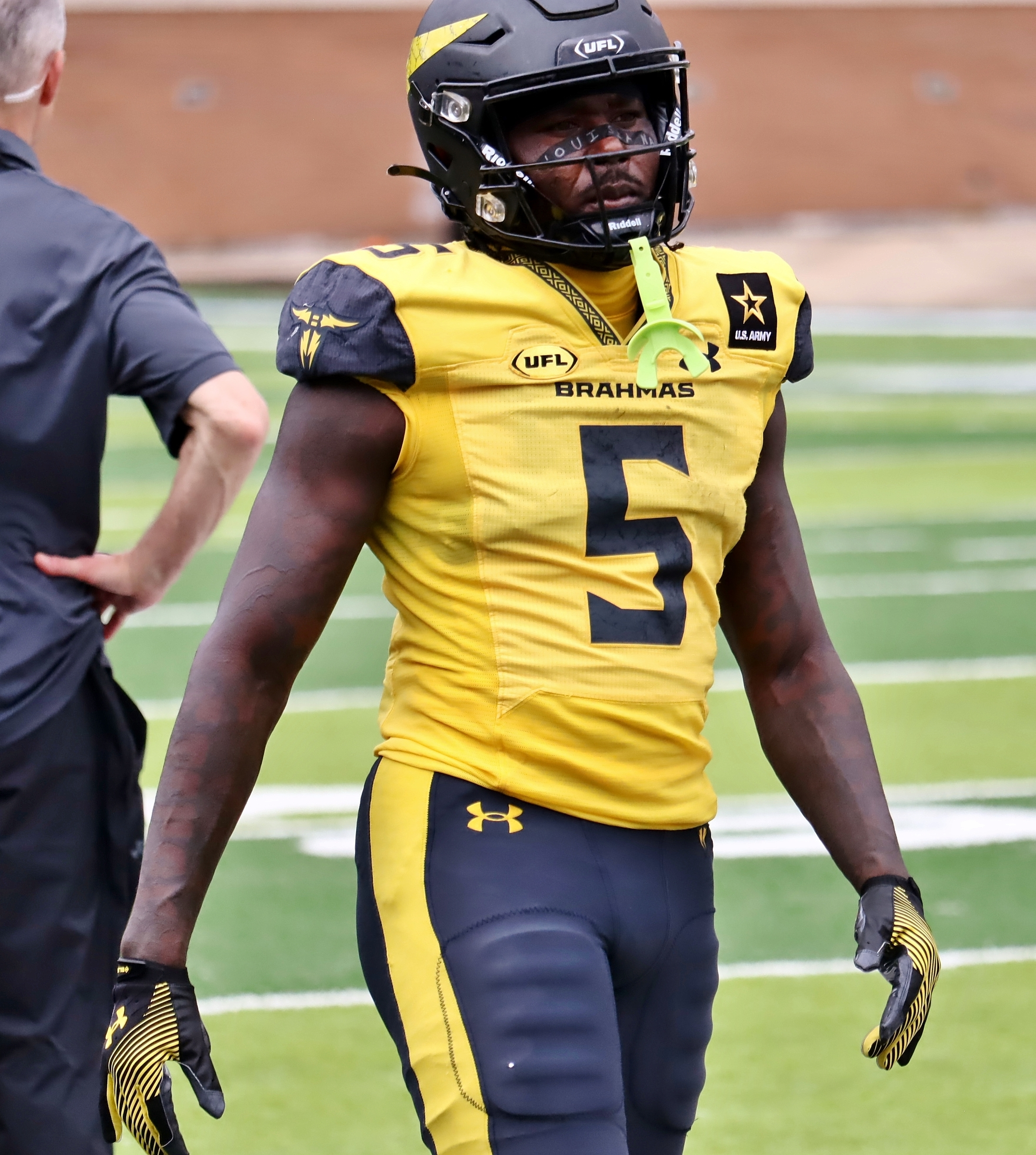
- Stevenson with the San Antonio Brahmas in 2024

Profile
- Position: Wide receiver

Personal information
- Born: March 26, 1998 (age 28); Shreveport, Louisiana, U.S.
- Listed height: 5 ft 10 in (1.78 m)
- Listed weight: 180 lb (82 kg)

Career information
- High school: Northwood (Shreveport)
- College: Houston (2016–2020)
- NFL draft: 2021: 6th round, 203rd overall pick

Career history
- Buffalo Bills (2021–2022); Cleveland Browns (2022)*; Carolina Panthers (2023)*; San Antonio Brahmas (2024–2025); Orlando Storm (2026)*
- * Offseason or practice squad member only

Awards and highlights
- 2× First-team All-AAC (2018, 2019)

Career NFL statistics
- Return yards: 297
- Stats at Pro Football Reference

Marquez Stevenson (born March 26, 1998) is an American professional football wide receiver. He played college football for the Houston Cougars.

== Early life ==
Stevenson attended Northwood High School in Shreveport, Louisiana. He committed to the University of Houston to play college football.

== College career ==
As a true freshman at Houston in 2016, Stevenson played in two games and did not record a reception but did have 36 receiving yards off a hook-and-ladder play. He missed the 2017 season, due to a torn ACL. He returned from the injury in 2018 to lead the team with 75 receptions for 1,019 yards and nine touchdowns. Stevenson again led the team with 52 receptions for 907 yards and nine touchdowns his junior year in 2019. He returned to Houston for his senior season in 2020, rather than enter the 2020 NFL draft. At the conclusion of his senior season, he participated in the 2021 Senior Bowl.

=== Statistics ===
Year	Team	Receiving				
Year	Team	GP	Rec	Yds	Avg	TD
2016	Houston	2	0	36	0.0	0
2018	Houston	13	75	1,019	13.6	9
2019	Houston	12	52	907	17.4	9
2020	Houston	5	20	307	15.4	4
Career		32	147	2,269	15.4	22

== Professional career ==
Pre-draft measurables
Height	Weight	Arm length	Hand span	40-yard dash	10-yard split	20-yard split	20-yard shuttle	Three-cone drill	Vertical jump	Broad jump
5 ft 10 1/8 in (1.78 m)	180 lb (82 kg)	31 in (0.79 m)	8 1/2 in (0.22 m)	4.48 s	1.60 s	2.63 s	4.21 s	6.86 s	33.0 in (0.84 m)	10 ft 2 in (3.10 m)
All values from Pro Day

=== Buffalo Bills ===
Stevenson was selected by the Buffalo Bills in the sixth round (203rd overall) of the 2021 NFL draft. On May 13, 2021, Stevenson signed his four-year rookie contract with Buffalo. He was placed on injured reserve on September 1, 2021. He was activated on November 25.

On August 31, 2022, Stevenson was placed on injured reserve. He was released on December 6, 2022 but was re-signed to the practice squad three days later. On December 13, Stevenson was released from the practice squad.

=== Cleveland Browns ===
On December 14, 2022, the Cleveland Browns signed Stevenson to their practice squad. He signed a reserve/future contract on January 9, 2023. On May 9, 2023, Stevenson was waived by the Browns.

=== Carolina Panthers ===
On May 16, 2023, Stevenson signed with the Carolina Panthers. He was waived on July 26, 2023. He reverted to the team’s reserve/physically unable to perform list on July 27, 2023. He was released on September 1, 2023.

=== San Antonio Brahmas ===
On January 19, 2024, Stevenson signed with the San Antonio Brahmas of the United Football League (UFL). He re-signed with the team on September 3, 2024.

=== Orlando Storm ===
On January 13, 2026, Stevenson was selected by the Orlando Storm in the 2026 UFL Draft. He was released on March 19.
