= Darius Bradwell =

American football player (born 1997)

Profile
- Position: Running back

Personal information
- Born: May 15, 1997 (age 29); Lake City, Florida
- Listed height: 6 ft 0 in (1.83 m)
- Listed weight: 235 lb (107 kg)

Career information
- High school: Godby High School
- College: Tulane (2016–2019)
- NFL draft: 2020: undrafted

Career history
- Los Angeles Chargers (2020–2021); Carolina Panthers (2022)*; St. Louis BattleHawks (2023)*; Seattle Sea Dragons (2023)
- * Offseason or practice squad member only
- Stats at Pro Football Reference

Darius Jaharold Bradwell (born May 15, 1997) is an American football running back. He played college football at Tulane.

== College career ==
Bradwell was a member of the Tulane Green Wave for four seasons. He finished his collegiate career with 2,062 yards and 17 touchdowns on 289 carries.

== Professional career ==
=== Los Angeles Chargers ===
Bradwell was signed by the Los Angeles Chargers as an undrafted free agent on April 27, 2020. He was waived during final roster cuts on September 5, 2020, and signed to the practice squad the next day. He was elevated to the active roster on September 19 for the team's week 2 game against the Kansas City Chiefs, and reverted to the practice squad after the game. He was elevated again on September 26 for the week 3 game against the Carolina Panthers, and reverted to the practice squad after the game. He signed a reserve/future contract with the Chargers on January 5, 2021.

On August 31, 2021, Bradwell was waived by the Chargers and re-signed to the practice squad the next day.

=== Carolina Panthers ===
On January 15, 2022, Bradwell signed a reserve/future contract with the Carolina Panthers. He was waived on August 14, 2022.

=== St Louis BattleHawks ===
On January 1, 2023, Bradwell was selected by the St. Louis BattleHawks in the 12th round of the 2023 XFL Supplemental Draft.

=== Seattle Sea Dragons ===
Bradwell was placed on the reserve list by the Seattle Sea Dragons on March 6, 2023, and released on April 21.
