= Malcolm Perry (American football) =

American football player (born 1997)

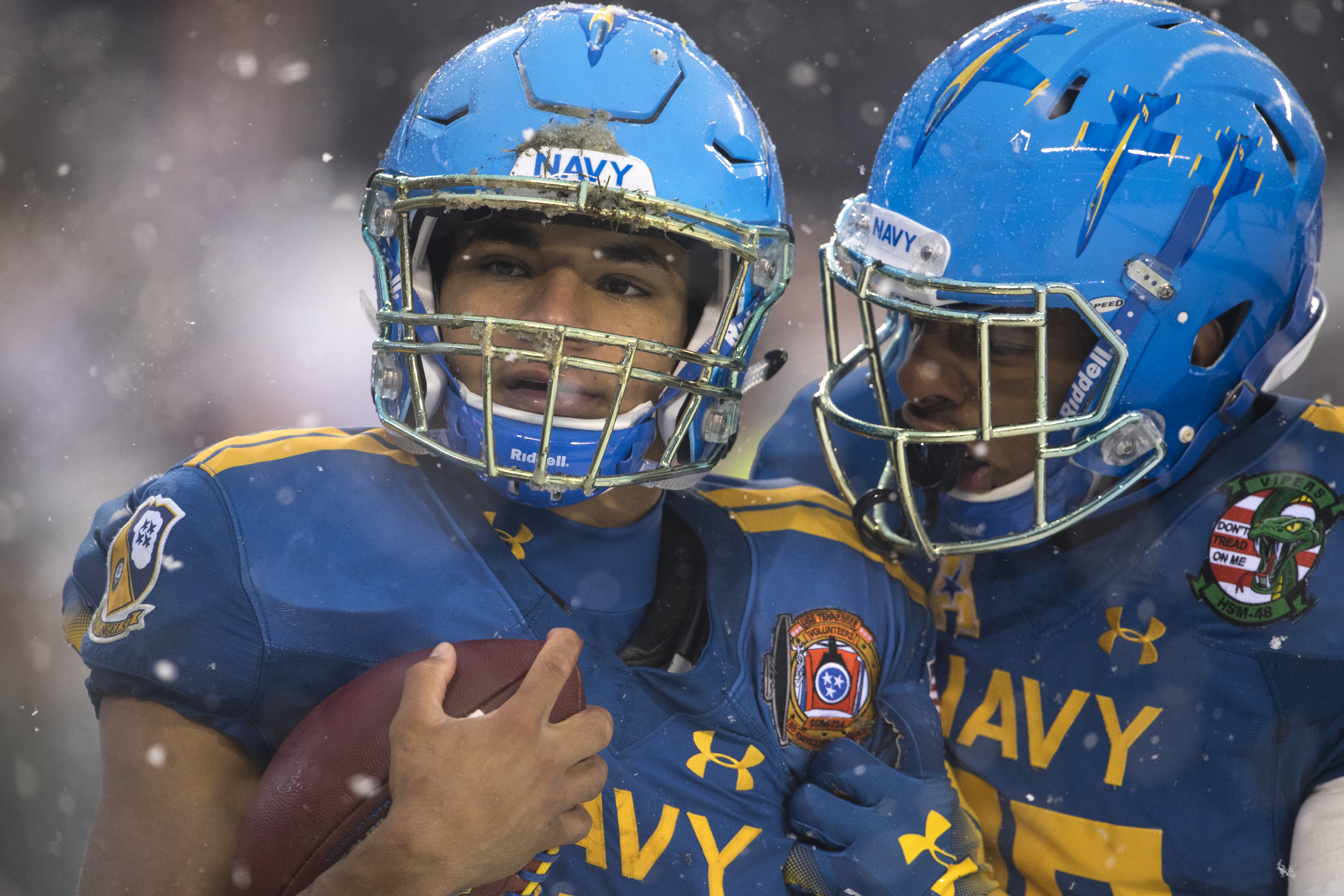
- Perry (left) celebrates a touchdown with receiver Terrence Laster during the 2017 Army–Navy Game

No. 10, 87, 19
- Position: Wide receiver

Personal information
- Born: April 19, 1997 (age 29); Hopkinsville, Kentucky, U.S.
- Listed height: 5 ft 10 in (1.78 m)
- Listed weight: 190 lb (86 kg)

Career information
- High school: Kenwood (Clarksville, Tennessee)
- College: Navy (2016–2019)
- NFL draft: 2020: 7th round, 246th overall pick

Career history
- Miami Dolphins (2020); New England Patriots (2021); New Orleans Saints (2021)*; New England Patriots (2022)*
- * Offseason or practice squad member only

Awards and highlights
- AAC Offensive Player of the Year (2019); First-team All-AAC (2019); FBS record: 2,017 rushing yards by a quarterback, season (2019)

Career NFL statistics
- Receptions: 9
- Receiving yards: 92
- Receiving touchdowns: 1
- Stats at Pro Football Reference

Malcolm Xiomar Perry (born April 19, 1997) is an American officer in the United States Marine Corps and a former professional football wide receiver. He attended the United States Naval Academy, where he played college football for the Navy Midshipmen from 2016 to 2019.

The son of United States Army personnel, Perry was a military brat who grew up in Tennessee. After high school and attending the Naval Academy Preparatory School, he joined the main campus and football team in 2016, where he played a variety of positions. He cycled between quarterback and slotback for his first two seasons before becoming the starting quarterback in 2018. After struggling that year and returning to slotback, he permanently reverted to quarterback in 2019. As a senior, he set various Navy and NCAA records, including the most rushing yards by a quarterback in a season, and was named American Athletic Conference (AAC) Offensive Player of the Year.

He was selected by the Miami Dolphins in the seventh round of the 2020 NFL draft. Perry spent his rookie season in Miami, during which he scored his first touchdown, before joining the New England Patriots prior to the 2021 season. After spending time on the Patriots' and New Orleans Saints' practice squads, he retired from the NFL in 2022 to begin his military service.

== Early life ==
Perry was born in Fort Campbell, where his parents Bonny and Malcolm Sr. were stationed as members of the United States Army. The family later moved to Clarksville, Tennessee. After growing up with basketball, Perry began playing football in third grade.

He attended Kenwood High School, where he played high school football for the Knights. He was named the team's quarterback in his sophomore year and led the team to three consecutive Class 5A state playoff appearances; all three postseason runs ended with losses to opponents that would make the state championship (with two winning). Perry's junior year saw him record 1,000 yards each in rushing and passing, a performance that ClarksvilleNow.com's Jimmy Trodglen wrote "almost carried the Knights offense alone." In his senior season in 2014, he recorded 800 passing yards, 1,600 rushing yards, and 20 touchdowns as he was named District 10 Most Valuable Player and The Leaf-Chronicle All Area Player of the Year. Perry concluded his high school career with two All-State selections.

== College career ==
After high school, Perry contemplated attending Middle Tennessee State University, where his older sister's friends played for the Blue Raiders football team, or enlisting in the armed forces. Although he hoped to play running back for the University of Tennessee, the team did not express interest in him. Instead, he was recruited by the three service academies in the NCAA Division I Football Bowl Subdivision (FBS)—Army, Navy, and Air Force—and his hometown school Austin Peay. Perry committed to Navy as the academy allowed him to play football in addition to serving, while the team also allowed him to select his position; in contrast, Air Force and Army wished to keep him at quarterback. In 2015, before enrolling at the main academy, he attended the Naval Academy Preparatory School. Despite starting the NAPS football season at slotback, he was moved to quarterback after starter Jonah Llanusa broke his wrist.

=== 2016 ===
During Perry's freshman year in 2016, offensive coordinator Ivin Jasper switched his position from slotback to quarterback. In addition to playing for the junior varsity team, he began the varsity season sharing the third-string quarterback spot with Zach Abey before being demoted to fourth string due to illness.

Perry made his varsity debut against Fordham after starting quarterback Tago Smith suffered an ACL tear. Although he was initially inactive for the game and instead watched from the stands, the injury forced the Midshipmen to pull Perry into action, while team equipment members had to return to campus to retrieve his uniform. Backup Will Worth played much of the game and Abey was suspended, leading to Perry seeing action in the fourth quarter. He led a 90-yard drive that resulted in a field goal, and ended the 52–16 Navy win with seven carries for 30 yards.

He saw playing time at slotback in Navy's game with SMU, where he recorded one carry for 13 yards. In the 2016 Armed Forces Bowl against Louisiana Tech, Perry entered the game with 3:46 remaining after Abey suffered an injury and scored on his lone play, a 30-yard touchdown run to tie the game at 45 points apiece. However, the Bulldogs kicked the game-winning field goal on the ensuing drive. It was Perry's first college touchdown and his only score in 2016 as he finished the season with nine carries for 73 yards.

=== 2017 ===
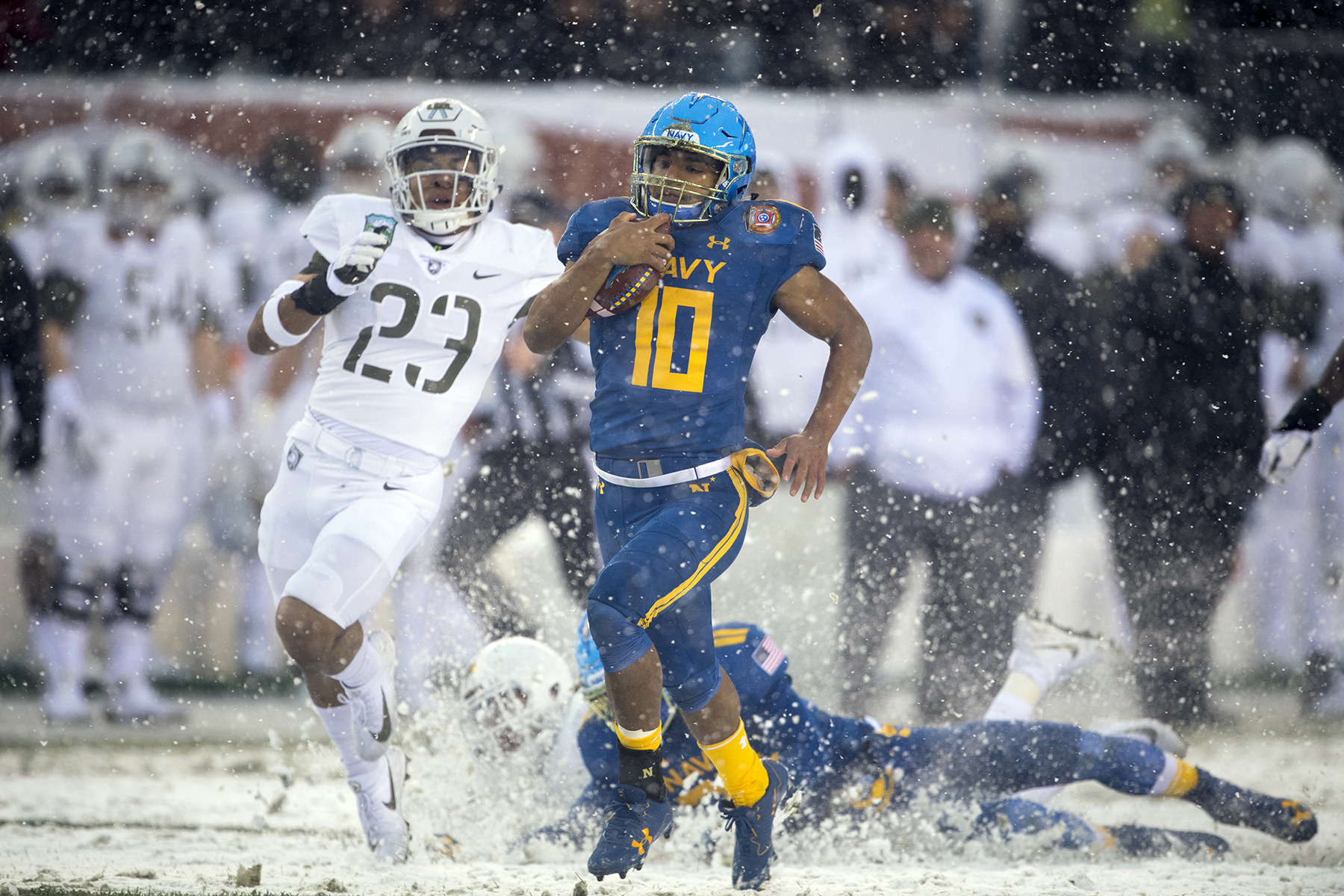
Perry runs for a touchdown in the 2017 Army–Navy Game

Entering the 2017 season, Perry was expected to serve as Abey's backup quarterback since he was the only other player on the team to have varsity experience at the position. However, Navy head coach Ken Niumatalolo moved him to slotback as he wanted to provide playing time for Perry; the change was spurred by Smith spending much of his Navy career backing up Keenan Reynolds, only to suffer a season-ending injury in his first game as a starter. Niumatalolo described Perry as "a very athletic kid who can help us and I'm going to get him on the field. I'm not going to have him standing on the sideline sending in signals." With Abey as the starter and junior Garret Lewis as backup, Llansula was originally slated as the third-string quarterback before he left the team, leading to Perry sharing the role with Jacob Harrison. Perry would start all 12 games in his sophomore year, including three at quarterback, and also served as the Midshipmen's kick returner after the incumbent Tre Walker was lost for the season to injury.

Perry's first 100-rushing yard game came against Cincinnati, followed by 104- and 127-yard performances against Tulsa and Air Force, respectively; the latter was a then-career-best for Perry. The Air Force game also saw him record a 91-yard touchdown, the third-longest carry in Navy history and the longest at Navy–Marine Corps Memorial Stadium, along with his first receiving touchdown on a 40-yard completion from Abey. In a 31–21 loss to UCF, Perry scored a 75-yard receiving touchdown and had a second score that was nullified by a holding penalty.

Against Temple, Perry completed his first touchdown pass with a five-yard throw to Abey; the score came on a trick play that began with Abey pretending to give audibles to his team before the ball was snapped to running back Darryl Bonner, who pitched to Perry on a reverse, who in turn threw to Abey for the touchdown. Abey suffered a shoulder injury in the loss, leading to Perry making his maiden start at quarterback the following against SMU. Although he recorded 282 rushing yards and four touchdowns, including a 92-yard run that was the second-longest rushing score in the team's history, he sprained his left ankle in the fourth quarter; Navy would win 43–40 after the Mustangs came back from a 34–11 halftime deficit. For the season's remaining games, Niumatalolo opted to name starting quarterbacks shortly before kickoffs as Perry and Abey's differing playing styles (Perry preferred to run to the outside and could quickly change his pace, while Abey was a better passer and employed a more physical running style) forced opponents to prepare differently even if Navy fundamentally ran the same offense regardless of the starter.

The 2017 Army–Navy Game saw Perry start at quarterback, though Navy went on to lose 14–13. In snowy conditions, he recorded 250 rushing yards on 30 attempts, including a 68-yard touchdown, but penalties on the final drive hampered the Midshipmen offense and resulted in Bennett Moehring's game-winning 48-yard field goal going wide left. Perry's rushing yards accounted for 84 percent of his team's total yardage in the game and were nine more than Army's total. The performance also allowed Perry to break 1,000 rushing yards in 2017; Abey also accomplished the feat, allowing Navy to have its third duo of 1,000-yard rushers in a season. The Midshipmen, who started with a 5–0 record, concluded the regular season 6–6 and played in the Military Bowl against Virginia. Perry scored two touchdowns and rushed for 114 yards before leaving with a foot injury in the 49–7 victory. The 114 rushing yards were the second-most in bowl history behind Reynolds' 144 in 2015.

He ended the year with 1,182 rushing yards and 11 touchdowns; he averaged 8.6 yards per carry, a Navy record and the third-highest in the nation. His 303 receiving yards and two touchdowns on 13 catches were second-best on the team.

=== 2018 ===
Perry began his junior year in 2018 as the Midshipmen's starting quarterback. Although he had thrown only two passes in his college career—one of which was intercepted—and Navy did not feature a pass-heavy offense, Jasper noted Perry possessed "a good arm" and threw "a great deep ball". As part of his new responsibilities, Perry transitioned into Navy's full triple option offense; in 2017, he only saw action at quarterback when the offense ran the read option from the shotgun formation. In July, he was placed on the preseason watch lists for the Maxwell (best college football player), Paul Hornung (most versatile player), and Walter Camp Awards (the Walter Camp Football Foundation's best player).

The Midshipmen opened 2018 with a 59–41 loss to Hawaii, during which Perry recorded 108 rushing yards and a 75-yard touchdown late in the first half. He also threw his first touchdown pass as a quarterback on a 19-yard score to Walker in the fourth quarter. In Navy's first American Athletic Conference (AAC) game of the year against Memphis, Perry led the team in all three offensive yardage categories (166 rushing, 22 passing, 17 receiving), the school's second player to do so after Reynolds in 2015; he also scored a "highlight-reel touchdown" as he dodged multiple Memphis players en route to a 14-yard touchdown run. This was followed by a 51–21 victory over Lehigh, during which Perry ran for 223 yards and three touchdowns as the Midshipmen recorded 629 total yards (tenth-most in program history), though he struggled with arm strength and accuracy as a passer.

The offense struggled through the next games, including a 35–7 loss to Air Force that dropped Navy to 2–3. The Midshipmen recorded just six first downs and 199 total yards in the loss, while Perry had a mere 54 yards on 19 carries (a number that was skewed by a 20-yard run). In a column published after the defeat, Capital Gazette writer and Navy beat reporter Bill Wagner criticized the team for its excessive reliance on Perry, whose 105 carries across the first five games greatly exceeded his teammates' attempts. Wagner called for Navy to "admit the Malcolm Perry experiment has been a mistake" as "Perry is a running back and not a quarterback. I completely understand the logic of wanting to put the ball in the hands of the best offensive player as much as possible, but Navy's coaching staff is trying to fit a square peg into a round hole in its desperate attempt to do so." TheMidReport's Mike James wrote Perry was "a year behind in his development as a quarterback" due to spending the previous year as a slotback, with Navy's offense consequently growing too complex for him; the system used in the Air Force game was simplified to aid Perry, but James noted the offense was the same used against Army in 2017 shortly after Perry returned to quarterback, which Air Force capitalized on.

After five games at quarterback, Perry was moved to slotback, a position that was hampered by mounting injuries. Although he was no longer the starting quarterback, he continued to see time at the position with Abey and Lewis. Despite the quarterback switch, the Midshipmen continued to struggle passing-wise as the three combined to complete less than 42 percent of their attempts. As a runner, Perry had just one more game of the remaining seven in which he recorded at least 100 yards—a 133-yard performance in a 44–22 loss to Notre Dame. In a one-point loss to Tulane, Perry threw a 37-yard touchdown pass to Abey, who also completed a 73-yard touchdown throw of his own to Perry in the game as Navy fell 29–28.

The Midshipmen ended the season 3–10, their worst record since 2002, including a third-straight loss to Army. Perry led Navy in rushing yards with 1,087 on 172 attempts, along with seven rushing touchdowns; in receiving, he recorded nine catches for 167 yards and a touchdown; when throwing, he completed nine of 25 passes for 222 yards, two touchdowns, and an interception. In March 2019, Niumatalolo admitted he was unsure if ousting Perry from the starting quarterback role during the 2018 season was "the right decision[...] We did what we felt was best for the team at the time, but when I go back and look at our games I'm not sure it worked out very well."

=== 2019 ===
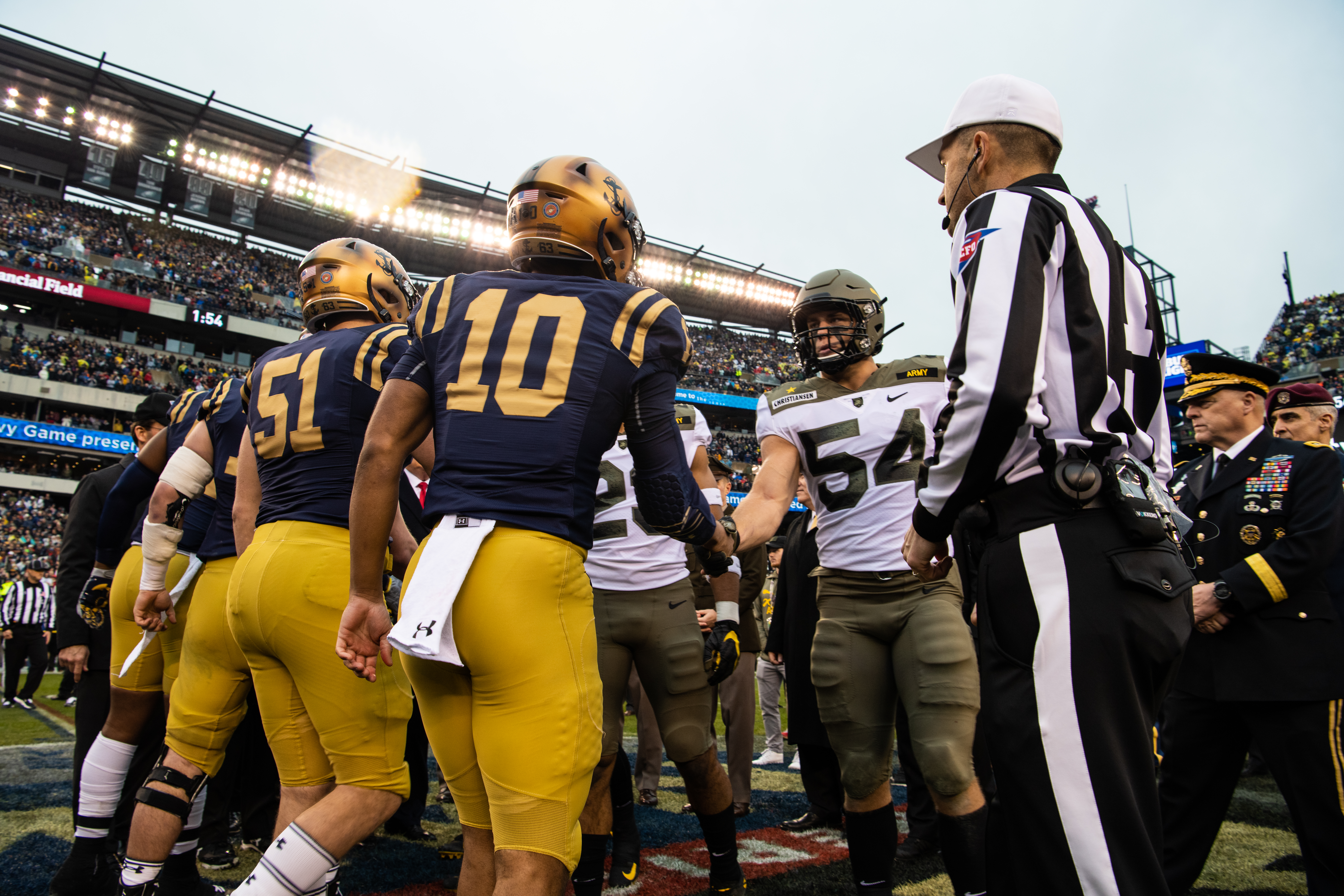
Perry (center) shakes hands with Army linebacker Cole Christiansen before the 2019 Army–Navy Game

For his senior year in 2019, Perry went back to quarterback and was named team co-captain. As Perry's playing style differed from previous Navy quarterbacks, Niumatalolo and Jasper redesigned Navy's offense to support him. For example, to assist his development as a passer, Navy hired Billy Ray Stutzmann to install features of the run and shoot offense; Stutzmann played in and coached the system at Hawaii. The run and shoot also shares formations and concepts with Navy's standard spread option offense. During the offseason, Perry focused on improving his decision making, noting that the option and passing aspects of the offense were "all in my hands now". Entering the 2019 season, Perry was again placed on the Maxwell Award watch list.

Perry and the Navy offense enjoyed success in the season-opening 45–7 win over Holy Cross as the quarterback recorded his first 100-passing yard performance, completing six of nine passes for 103 yards, and ran for 28 yards and a touchdown. The following week against East Carolina saw Perry combine for six touchdowns—two passing and four rushing—and 307 total yards in a 42–10 victory; the six scores were the most by a Navy player in a game since Reynolds' seven in 2014. Perry also became the first Midshipman to record at least 150 rushing and passing yards apiece in one game since Ricky Dobbs in 2010. Navy's first loss of the year, a 35–23 defeat by Memphis, saw Perry run for two touchdowns and throw for another, but the Midshipmen's offensive production faltered in the second half. He was also pulled from the game on three occasions after hurting his throwing shoulder while sustaining hard hits, prompting coaches to advise him to avoid absorbing tackles.

The Midshipmen avenged their blowout loss to Air Force the previous year with a 34–25 win, during which Perry led an 11-play, 75-yard drive late in the game that ended with his go-ahead three-yard touchdown run. Against Tulsa, he ran for 218 yards and three touchdowns as Navy won their first away game since they beat the Golden Hurricane in September 2017. Perry continued his string of success by rushing for 188 yards and two scores against South Florida, guiding the final drive against Tulane that led to Bijan Nichols' game-winning field goal, and another two-score performance in a 56–10 blowout over Connecticut that placed Navy on a five-game winning streak. At the time, the Midshipmen were 7–1, their best record after eight games since the team began using the triple option in 2002. The Connecticut game also saw Perry run for 108 yards to surpass the 1,000-rushing-yard mark for the season, making him the first Navy player since Reynolds to record 1,000 rushing yards in three seasons.

Navy's win streak was snapped with a 52–20 loss to Notre Dame. Perry recorded 117 rushing yards on 25 attempts, but lost three fumbles in the first half before being benched for Perry Olsen in the third quarter. He rebounded in the next game against SMU by completing a career-best nine of fifteen passes for 162 yards and a touchdown, while also running for 195 yards and two scores in the 35–28 win. In Houston against the Cougars, Perry ran for 146 yards and a touchdown, along with throwing for 107 yards on just two attempts, as Navy won 56–41; it was the Midshipmen's first victory at TDECU Stadium since they joined the AAC. The win tied Navy at the top of the conference's West Division with Memphis, but the Tigers were named division champion thanks to their win over the Midshipmen earlier in the year.

In early December, Perry was named AAC Offensive Player of the Year and first-team All-Conference; at the time of the announcement, he led the conference in rushing yards per game (136.4), which was also the most among quarterbacks in the nation, along with 1,500 rushing yards and 19 touchdowns. Against Army, he ran for a career-high and rivalry-record 304 yards (the first Navy player to do so against an FBS opponent and the second in general) and two touchdowns as the Midshipmen won 31–7, their first win in the rivalry since 2015. His performance allowed him to break two Navy records: Worth's 2016 single-season total offense record with 2,831 yards and Napoleon McCallum's 1983 single-season rushing yardage record with 1,804, while his 606 rushing yards in three Army–Navy Games were the most by any player in rivalry history. He was also the third player in school history to record 4,000 career rushing yards, joining McCallum and Reynolds. The Midshipmen concluded the regular season 10–2, during which Perry had nine consecutive games with at least 100 rushing yards and two games with over 200, the fourth player in school history to accomplish the latter.

The 2019 Liberty Bowl against Kansas State was Perry's final college game. He completed five of seven passes for 57 yards and a touchdown, while also running for 213 yards on 28 carries; the rushing yards surpassed Dobbs' 106 in the 2009 Texas Bowl for the most by a Navy player in a bowl game. Perry received game MVP honors in the 20–17 Navy victory. He ended 2019 with 2,017 rushing yards, surpassing Jordan Lynch's record for the most rushing yards by a quarterback in a season, while his 4,359 career rushing yards were the 79th-most among all players in college football history and the second-most by a Midshipman behind Reynolds.

=== Statistics ===
Year	Team	Games			Passing								Rushing			
Year	Team	GP	GS	Record (Note: Accounts for only GS as a QB. Perry started nine games as SB in 2017)	Comp	Att	Pct	Yards	Avg	TD	Int	Rate	Att	Yards	Avg	TD
2016	Navy	3	0	—	0	0	0.0	0	0	0	0	0.0	9	73	8.1	1
2017	Navy	12	12	2–1	1	2	50.0	5	2.5	1	1	136.0	138	1,182	8.6	11
2018	Navy	13	13	3–10	9	25	36.0	222	8.9	2	1	129.0	172	1,087	6.3	7
2019	Navy	13	13	11–2	48	86	55.8	1,084	12.6	7	3	181.6	295	2,017	6.8	21
Career		41	38	16–13	58	113	51.3	1,311	11.5	10	5	169.1	614	4,359	7.1	40

== Professional career ==
Pre-draft measurables
Height	Weight	Arm length	Hand span	Wingspan	40-yard dash	10-yard split	20-yard split	20-yard shuttle	Three-cone drill	Vertical jump	Broad jump	Bench press
5 ft 9 1/2 in (1.77 m)	186 lb (84 kg)	29 5/8 in (0.75 m)	8 1/2 in (0.22 m)	5 ft 11 1/2 in (1.82 m)	4.63 s	1.57 s	2.75 s	4.31 s	7.12 s	36.0 in (0.91 m)	10 ft 2 in (3.10 m)	10 reps
All values from NFL Combine

=== 2020 NFL draft ===
Perry, who was assigned to the United States Marine Corps for his post-Academy military commitment, entered the 2020 NFL draft as a wide receiver; he explained the position change gave him "the best opportunity to play at the next level". Although service academy graduates were required to serve for five years, Secretary of Defense Mark Esper signed an order in November 2019 that allowed athletes from the academies to defer their service to play professional sports upon receiving approval.

During the pre-draft process, Perry participated in the 2020 East–West Shrine Bowl, playing for the East team. He had one carry in the 31–27 East win: he received the snap as a quarterback on a speed option play, from which he faked a lateral to running back Adrian Killins before running 52 yards for a touchdown. In February, he was invited to the NFL Scouting Combine; Perry was the second player in Navy history to attend the event, joining long snapper Joe Cardona in 2015.

He was regarded as a potential late-round draft pick or undrafted free agent by various outlets, with NFL.com's Lance Zierlein considering him a "priority free agent" and WalterFootball.com's Charlie Campbell projecting him in the sixth-round-to-undrafted range. Although draft scouts like Zierlein praised his toughness and intelligence, his small frame and the move to wide receiver were seen as concerns. However, Zierlein also added Perry's experience in the option offense and versatility made him a viable utility player in the NFL. During the pre-draft process, Perry met with the Los Angeles Chargers and Tennessee Titans at the East–West Shrine Bowl.

=== Miami Dolphins ===
Perry was selected by the Miami Dolphins in the seventh round of the 2020 NFL Draft with the 246th overall pick, becoming the first drafted service academy player in Dolphins history. He was placed on the reserve/COVID-19 list by the team on August 3, 2020, and was activated three days later.

After being inactive for the early games of the 2020 season, Perry made his NFL debut in the Dolphins' Week 8 win over the Los Angeles Rams, during which he recorded a ten-yard reception and was a wildcat formation quarterback on two plays. He was the fourth triple option-era Navy player to play in an NFL regular season game after Cardona, Reynolds, and Kyle Eckel. He caught his first touchdown pass, a 25-yard throw from fellow rookie Tua Tagovailoa, in a Week 17 loss to the Buffalo Bills. Perry concluded his rookie season with nine receptions for 92 yards and a touchdown, along with three carries for five yards.

During the 2021 preseason, Perry played receiver and return specialist. He saw little playing time on offense across the first two games against the Chicago Bears and Atlanta Falcons as he combined for just two receptions and 41 yards; as a returner, he recorded one of Miami's four punt returns that went for at least 20 yards in Chicago, while he returned four kickoffs for 84 yards and two punts for 13 yards versus Atlanta. His offensive snaps increased in the final game against the Cincinnati Bengals with four catches for 69 yards, including a play that went 36 yards. Due to the Dolphins having too many receivers on their roster, he was one of four released on August 31 as part of final roster cuts to reach the 53-player limit.

=== New England Patriots ===
Although the Dolphins had hoped to sign Perry to the practice squad for the 2021 regular season, the New England Patriots claimed him off waivers on September 2. Patriots head coach Bill Belichick, who is closely connected to the Naval Academy via his father and former Navy assistant coach Steve Belichick, had "heavily scouted" Perry entering the 2020 draft. The signing also made Perry one of two Navy players on the Patriots' active roster alongside Cardona. A foot injury caused him to miss the season opener against the Dolphins, and he was moved to the injured reserve list on September 11. He was released on November 17.

=== New Orleans Saints ===
Six days after departing the Patriots, Perry was signed to the New Orleans Saints practice squad with plans of quickly promoting him to the active roster to assist a struggling wide receiver unit. He never played a game for New Orleans and was one of four practice squad members released on December 28.

=== Return to New England Patriots and retirement ===
"Coming from the Naval Academy, it's very rare to make it in the NFL. Just getting a shot in the first place is amazing and I'm truly thankful. I enjoyed every single second of my NFL experience. Just being out on the field competing each day and getting to know so many great teammates [...] it's definitely something I'll remember and cherish the rest of my life."

— Perry after announcing his retirement from football

Perry returned to New England by signing a reserve/future contract on January 11, 2022. On July 22, days before training camp began, he was placed on the reserve/retired list as he intended to commit to naval service. A day later, Perry officially announced his retirement from the NFL.

His decision to end his playing career was attributed to a "burning desire to go serve and fulfill the commitment I signed up for when I went to the Naval Academy. I kind of came to the conclusion that I was ready to call it quits and go do something that means a lot to me, my family and my country."

== Military career ==
Malcolm Perry
- Military career
- Allegiance: United States
- Branch: United States Marine Corps
- Service years: 2022–present
- Rank: Second lieutenant

After retiring from the NFL, Perry commissioned as an officer in the Marine Corps and underwent training at The Basic School on Marine Corps Base Quantico. Unlike some Navy-to-NFL players like Cardona who played while serving in the United States Navy Reserve, he was obligated to serve five years on active duty under his academy contract.

Following basic training, he studied drone warfare at Lackland Air Force Base and Marine Corps Air Station Cherry Point. As of 2025, he is stationed at MCAS Yuma as an unmanned aerial systems officer.

== Personal life ==
Perry's parents were members of the Army's 101st Airborne Division. The two served in the Gulf War, with Malcolm Maurice Perry being involved in refueling operations and Bonny in parts repair and supply. A military brat, Malcolm Jr. is the youngest of six children, with two of his siblings being born in North Carolina and another in Germany.

At the Naval Academy, he was a quantitative economics major.
