= 2019 Navy Midshipmen football team =

American college football season

2019 Navy Midshipmen football

AAC West Division co-champion Liberty Bowl champion

Liberty Bowl, W 20–17 vs. Kansas State
- Conference: American Athletic Conference
- West Division

Ranking
- Coaches: No. 20
- AP: No. 20
- Record: 11–2 (7–1 AAC)
- Head coach: Ken Niumatalolo (12th season)
- Offensive coordinator: Ivin Jasper (12th season)
- Offensive scheme: Triple option
- Defensive coordinator: Brian Newberry (1st season)
- Co-defensive coordinator: Brian Norwood (1st season)
- Base defense: 4–2–5
- MVP: Malcolm Perry
- Captains: Paul Carothers; Nizaire Cromartie; Ford Higgins; Malcolm Perry
- Home stadium: Navy–Marine Corps Memorial Stadium

Uniform
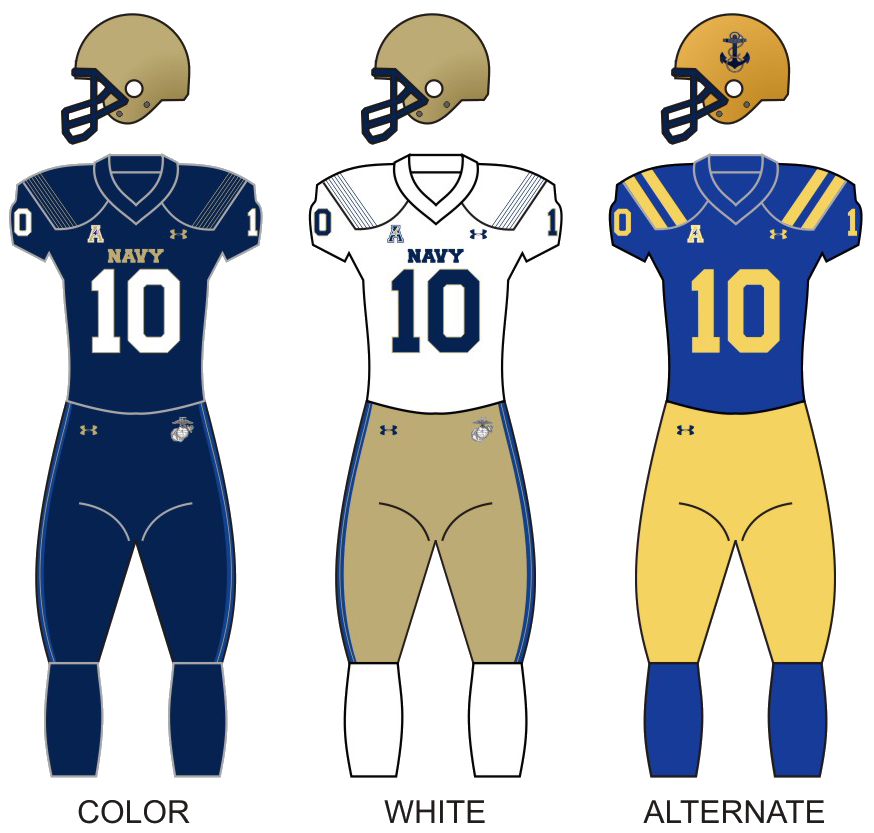

2019 American Athletic Conference football standings
	Conf.			Overall
Team	W		L	W		L
East Division
No. 21 Cincinnati xy	7	–	1	11	–	3
No. 24 UCF	6	–	2	10	–	3
Temple	5	–	3	8	–	5
South Florida	2	–	6	4	–	8
East Carolina	1	–	7	4	–	8
UConn	0	–	8	2	–	10
West Division
No. 17 Memphis xy$	7	–	1	12	–	2
No. 20 Navy x	7	–	1	11	–	2
SMU	6	–	2	10	–	3
Tulane	3	–	5	7	–	6
Houston	2	–	6	4	–	8
Tulsa	2	–	6	4	–	8
Championship: Memphis 29, Cincinnati 24
$ – Conference champion; x – Division champion/co-champions; y – Championship game participant; Rankings from AP Poll

The 2019 Navy Midshipmen football team represented the United States Naval Academy in the 2019 NCAA Division I FBS football season. The Midshipmen were led by 12th-year head coach Ken Niumatalolo and played their home games at Navy–Marine Corps Memorial Stadium. Navy competed as a member of the American Athletic Conference (AAC) in the West Division.

== Preseason ==
=== Offseason ===
In December 2018, former defensive coordinator Dale Pehrson retired. He was replaced by Kennesaw State defensive coordinator Brian Newberry. On January 12, 2019, the Naval Academy athletic department officially announced the hiring of Brian Newberry as the new defensive coordinator and safeties coach, as well as three new assistant coaches in Brian Norwood (co-defensive coordinator/cornerbacks), Kevin Downing (defensive ends/raiders), and P.J. Volker (inside linebackers). Additionally, the remaining defensive assistant coaches from the previous year's staff were shuffled to new positions, with Steve Johns taking over strikers, Justin Davis taking over nose guards/defensive tackles, and R.B. Green becoming a general defensive assistant coach.

On February 21 Navy beat writer for the Annapolis Capital Gazette, Bill Wagner, published a story relaying that fullbacks coach Mike Judge and nose guards/defensive tackles coach Justin Davis were leaving the USNA football program to pursue other opportunities, with Davis joining the Miami Dolphins as a Defensive Quality Control coach and Davis pursuing a business opportunity. The USNA Athletic Department announced on February 27 the hires of Jerrick Hall from Elon as Nose Guards/defensive tackles coach and Jason MacDonald from the United States Naval Academy Preparatory School as Fullbacks coach.

Following the completion of the spring football session, head coach Ken Niumatalolo announced that raider Nizaire Cromartie, linebacker Paul Carothers, center Ford Higgins, and quarterback Malcolm Perry had been selected as team captains for the 2019 season.

=== Award watch lists ===
Listed in the order that they were released

Award	Player	Position	Year
Maxwell Award	Malcolm Perry	QB	SR
Rimington Trophy	Ford Higgins	C	SR
Patrick Mannelly Award	Michael Pifer	LS	SR
Johnny Unitas Golden Arm Award	Malcolm Perry	QB	SR

=== AAC media poll ===
The preseason poll was released at the 2019 AAC Media Day on July 16, 2019. The Midshipmen were predicted to finish in fifth place in the AAC West Division.

== Schedule ==
Date	Time	Opponent	Rank	Site	TV	Result	Attendance
August 31	3:30 p.m.	Holy Cross*		Navy-Marine Corps Memorial Stadium; Annapolis, MD	CBSSN	W 45–7	28,531
September 14	3:30 p.m.	East Carolina		Navy-Marine Corps Memorial Stadium; Annapolis, MD	CBSSN	W 42–10	30,707
September 26	8:00 p.m.	at Memphis		Liberty Bowl Memorial Stadium; Memphis, TN	ESPN	L 23–35	33,909
October 5	3:30 p.m.	Air Force*		Navy-Marine Corps Memorial Stadium; Annapolis, MD (Commander-in-Chief's Trophy)	CBSSN	W 34–25	37,957
October 12	7:30 p.m.	at Tulsa		Skelly Field at H. A. Chapman Stadium; Tulsa, OK	ESPNU	W 45–17	17,951
October 19	3:30 p.m.	South Florida		Navy-Marine Corps Memorial Stadium; Annapolis, MD	CBSSN	W 35–3	29,774
October 26	3:30 p.m.	Tulane^{†}		Navy-Marine Corps Memorial Stadium; Annapolis, MD	CBSSN	W 41–38	31,118
November 1	8:00 p.m.	at UConn		Rentschler Field; East Hartford, CT	ESPN2	W 56–10	16,659
November 16	2:30 p.m.	at No. 16 Notre Dame*	No. 23	Notre Dame Stadium; Notre Dame, IN (rivalry)	NBC	L 20–52	74,080
November 23	3:30 p.m.	No. 25 SMU		Navy-Marine Corps Memorial Stadium; Annapolis, MD (Gansz Trophy)	CBSSN	W 35–28	33,732
November 30	7:00 p.m.	at Houston		TDECU Stadium; Houston, TX	ESPN2	W 56–41	22,824
December 14	3:00 p.m.	vs. Army*	No. 23	Lincoln Financial Field; Philadelphia, PA (Army–Navy Game, College GameDay)	CBS	W 31–7	68,705
December 31	3:45 p.m.	vs. Kansas State*	No. 23	Liberty Bowl Memorial Stadium; Memphis, TN (Liberty Bowl)	ESPN	W 20–17	50,515
*Non-conference game; ^{†}Homecoming; Rankings from AP Poll and College Football Playoff Rankings after November 5 released prior to game; All times are in Eastern time

== Personnel ==
=== Coaching staff ===
Name	Position	Seasons at Navy	Alma mater
Ken Niumatalolo	Head coach	22 (12 as HC)	Hawaii (1989)
Offensive staff
Ivin Jasper	Offensive coordinator / quarterbacks coach	20	Hawaii (1994)
Joe DuPaix	Slotbacks coach	5	Southern Utah (1998)
Ashley Ingram	Running game coordinator / offensive centers and guards coach	12	North Alabama (1996)
Jason MacDonald	Fullbacks Coach	1	Springfield College (Mass) (2004)
Danny O'Rourke	Special teams coordinator / offensive tackles coach	18	West Georgia (1999)
Mick Yokitis	Wide receivers coach	9	Navy (2006)
Billy Ray Stutzmann	Offensive assistant coach	1	Hawaii (2013)
Defensive staff
Brian Newberry	Defensive coordinator / safeties coach	1	Baylor (1998)
Brian Norwood	Co-defensive coordinator / Cornerbacks coach	6	Hawaii (1988)
Kevin Downing	Defensive ends / raiders coach	1	North Carolina Central (2004)
Robert Green	Defensive assistant coach	7	Navy (1998)
Steve Johns	Strikers Coach	12	Occidental College (1991)
Jerrick Hall	Nose Guards / defensive tackles coach	1	NC State (2004)
P.J. Volker	Linebackers coach	1	Mount St. Joseph (2005)
Support staff
Joe Battaglia	Defensive Quality Control Analyst	3	Guilford College (2008)
Brian Blick	Director of football operations	3	Navy (2012)
Bryan Fitzpatrick	Head Football Strength and Conditioning / Associate A.D. – Sports Performance	8	Towson (2005)
David Mahoney	Recruiting coordinator	3	Navy (2007)
Bryan Miller	Associate Football Strength and Conditioning / sports science coordinator	5	North Park
Omar Nelson	Director of player personnel	3	Navy (1997)
Capt. Ross Pospisil	Director of player development		Navy (2010)
Sydney Sims	Assistant recruiting coordinator for Football		
Kevin Slattery	Director of Football Creative Design	1	York College (PA) (2016)
Capt. Mike Walsh	Volunteer Defensive Analyst		Navy (2009)
Laura Webb	Administrative assistant to the head football coach		
SSgt. Anthony Williams	Assistant Director of player development		

=== Roster ===
The Navy football roster at the beginning of 2019 fall camp (as of Aug 6, 2019):

2019 Navy Midshipmen roster
Quarterback: 2 Tyger Goslin, Sophomore (5'11, 188); 6 Perry Olsen, Freshman (6'2, 210); 8 Dalen Morris, Junior (6'1, 213); 9 Maasai Maynor, Freshman (6'0, 180); 10 Malcolm Perry, Senior (5'9, 190); Slot Back: 14 Zachary Kuhlman, Freshman (6'1, 180); 15 Mike Mauai, Freshman (5'10, 186); 17 Colby Jacques, Freshman (5'8, 175); 20 CJ Williams, Junior (5'8, 175); 21 Tyreek King–El, Junior (5'8, 178); 22 Travis Brannan, Senior (6'0, 180); 23 Myles Fells, Junior (5'11, 180); 24 Justin Smith, Junior (5'11, 197); 25 Tazh Maloy, Senior (5'7, 178); 26 Garrett Winn, Junior (5'10, 175); 28 Keoni–Kordell Makekau, Junior (5'11, 175); 29 Ethan Bibb, Freshman (5'10, 175); 33 Carlinos Acie, Sophomore (5'9, 190); 35 Josh Johnson, Sophomore (5'7, 184); 40 Mason Plante, Senior (5'11, 188); Fullback: 32 Isaac Ruoss, Sophomore (6'1, 220); 34 Jamale Carothers, Sophomore (5'9, 203); 36 Jonathon Lee, Junior (5'11, 205); 37 James Harris II, Sophomore (6'0, 230); 38 Gavin Marts, Freshman (6'0, 219); 41 Brandon Madison, Freshman (5'11, 195); 43 Nelson Smith, Junior (5'9, 218); 45 Jeremiah Boyd, Sophomore (6'0, 217); Wide receiver: 1 Tyshawn Buckner, Freshman (6'3, 191); 3 Mychal Cooper, Sophomore (6'5, 215); 7 Joe Carter, Freshman (6'2, 205); 11 Devin Mathews, Freshman (6'4, 194); 13 Chance Warren, Sophomore (5'10, 185); 46 Mark Walker, Freshman (6'2, 180); 47 Michael Naze, Freshman (6'3, 231); 48 Christian Hutchinson, Freshman (6'4, 215); 80 Kody Crider, Junior (6'3, 245); 81 Devon High, Sophomore (6'0, 190); 82 Emmett Davis, Junior (6'1, 177); 83 Marcell Gleaton, Sophomore (6'3, 216); 84 Tanner Matthews, Junior (6'4, 235); 85 Aleksei Yaramus, Senior (6'2, 214); 86 OJ Davis, Senior (6'2, 229); 87 Ryan Mitchell, Junior (6'3, 200); 88 Brendan Mitchell, Sophomore (6'5, 210); 89 Chase Parrish, Junior (5'11, 181); Punter: 4 Owen White, Senior (5'10, 197); Kicker: 18 J.R. Osborn, Senior (6'0, 190); 31 Bijan Nichols, Freshman (6'1, 165); 39 Ben Fee, Sophomore (5'10, 231); 42 Daniel Davies, Freshman (5'10, 160)	Offensive lineman: 50 Jake Cossavella, Freshman (6'4, 250); 51 Kip Frankland, Freshman (6'1, 280); 52 Nick Bernacchi, Sophomore (6'2, 276); 53 Luca Fratianne, Sophomore (6'2, 282); 54 Jackson Lee Mitchell, Sophomore (6'4, 245); 55 Brandon Moore, Freshman (6'1, 306); 57 Clayton Nelson, Freshman (6'3, 290); 58 Luke Coleman, Freshman (6'4, 315); 59 Eric Cal, Senior (6'3, 268); 60 TJ Salu, Senior (6'2, 297); 61 Ben Everett, Junior (6'4, 275); 62 Pierce Banbury, Sophomore (6'2, 288); 63 Joe Goff, Senior (6'5, 284); 64 Kurt Stengel, Junior (6'4, 261); 65 Wes Mehl, Senior (6'4, 312); 66 Niko Yaramus, Senior (6'3, 281); 67 Bryce Texeira, Sophomore (6'2, 279); 68 David Forney, Senior (6'3, 305); 69 Nick Dell'Acqua, Sophomore (6'4, 294); 70 Jamie Romo, Freshman (6'5, 260); 71 Billy Honaker, Junior (6'3, 282); 72 Ford Higgins, Senior (6'2, 260); 73 Peter Nestrowitz, Junior (6'3, 287); 74 Jude Hydrick, Senior (6'3, 230); 75 Sean Rattay, Junior (6'1, 279); 76 Kendel Wright, Senior (6'4, 287); 77 Mike Adzima, Senior (6'2, 288); 78 Mattie Conlon, Sophomore (6'2, 283); 78 Joseph Petti, Freshman (6'6, 295); 79 Justin Self, Junior (6'2, 268); 92 Nicolas Rowan, Freshman (6'1, 285); 93 Talvis Robinson, Freshman (6'2, 300); Defensive lineman: 52 Denzel Polk, Senior (6'2, 261); 60 Antonio Greer, Freshman (6'2, 240); 61 Quinzy Salu, Freshman (6'3, 255); 63 Jacobi Rice, Freshman (6'3, 270); 64 John Brand, Freshman (6'3, 255); 65 Marcus Williams, Freshman (6'1, 255); 66 Dexter Manior, Freshman (6'3, 235); 69 Timber Berzins, Sophomore (6'4, 268); 70 Mack Nash, Senior (6'5, 250); 78 Alefosio Saipaia, Freshman (6'0, 280); 90 Chris Pearson, Junior (6'3, 317); 91 Cal Long, Sophomore (6'2, 230); 92 Deondrae Williams, Sophomore (6'0, 260); 93 Marcus Edwards, Senior (6'4, 289); 94 J'arius Warren, Sophomore (6'1, 257); 95 Tobe Okafor, Junior (6'4, 289); 96 Jackson Perkins, Junior (6'6, 257); 97 Dave Tolentino, Senior (6'2, 301); 98 Mike Flowers, Junior (6'3, 318); 99 Jackson Pittman, Senior (6'3, 300); Raider: 33 Carter Bankston, Senior (6'3, 229); 46 Ian Blake, Junior (6'2, 226); 55 John Kelly III, Sophomore (6'2, 225); 56 Nizaire Cromartie, Senior (6'2, 237); 58 Jacob Gregory, Junior (6'3, 234); 86 John Amell, Freshman (6'3, 225); 88 Max Sandlin, Freshman (6'4, 220)	Linebacker: 31 Austin Talbert–Loving, Junior (6'0, 202); 41 Tyler Pistorio, Senior (6'2, 215); 42 Sion Harrington, Senior (6'3, 217); 47 Colton Higgins, Freshman (6'1, 195); 48 Bryce Shaw, Sophomore (6'1, 220); 49 Trent Shiraki, Freshman (6'0, 215); 50 Mitchell Johns, Sophomore (6'1, 224); 51 Paul Carothers, Senior (6'1, 222); 53 Tama Tuitele, Freshman (6'1, 230); 54 Diego Fagot, Sophomore (6'3, 240); 57 Nick Straw, Freshman (6'2, 230); 59 Tysean White, Freshman (6'3, 225); 85 Tommy Lawley, Sophomore (6'2, 219); Striker: 1 Jacob Springer, Junior (6'1, 206); 17 Tony Brown, Sophomore (6'3, 201); 35 Walter Little, Senior (5'11, 211); 38 Michael Salisbury, Sophomore (6'2, 200); 45 Chelen Garnes, Freshman (5'11, 185); 82 Joshua Adams, Freshman (6'0, 190); 83 Charles Reed, Freshman (6'0, 200); Cornerback: 2 Marcus Wiggins, Junior (6'4, 188); 3 Cameron Kinley, Junior (6'2, 204); 5 Michael McMorris, Sophomore (5'9, 166); 9 Daniel Taylor, Sophomore (5'10, 180); 14 Micah Farrar, Junior (6'0, 189); 16 Jeremy Griffis, Senior (5'9, 187); 22 Jamal Glenn, Sophomore (5'11, 175); 23 Brandon Willis, Freshman (5'10, 170); 24 David Miller, Freshman (5'9, 170); 25 Jordan Geter, Freshman (5'10, 174); 26 Tyler Rogers, Sophomore (5'10, 176); 28 Ebissa Sambo, Freshman (5'10, 160); 29 Caleb Clear, Sophomore (6'1, 183); 39 BJ Gibson, Freshman (6'4, 184); 43 Justin Nelson, Freshman (5'11, 177); 44 Adrion Taylor, Freshman (5'9, 165); Safety: 4 Terrell Adams, Freshman (6'0, 190); 6 Mitchell West, Sophomore (5'10, 192); 7 Chike Otaluka, Sophomore (6'0, 190); 8 Elan Nash, Senior (5'11, 205); 10 Vincent Thomas Jr., Freshman (5'10, 170); 11 Evan Fochtman, Junior (6'1, 201); 13 Mike Cabrera, Junior (5'10, 198); 15 Noruwa Obanor, Senior (6'1, 194); 18 Kevin Brennan, Sophomore (5'11, 205); 20 Dakare Coston, Sophomore (6'2, 192); 21 John Marshall, Freshman (6'2, 190); 32 Taylor Robinson, Freshman (6'0, 175); 34 Jebril Murray, Freshman (5'11, 180); 36 Derek Atwaters, Freshman (6'1, 185); 37 Jaison Taylor, Freshman (5'11, 181); 40 Walter Soefker, Freshman (5'11, 192); Long snapper: 44 Michael Pifer, Senior (6'3, 245); 49 Kyle Gibbs, Junior (6'2, 206)

=== Depth chart ===
Depth chart published in the 120th Army–Navy Game game notes (as of December 9, 2019).

Defense

FS
Evan Fochtman
Noruwa Obanor
OR Chelen Garnes

RAIDER	WILL	MIKE	STRIKER
Nizaire Cromartie	Paul Carothers	Diego Fagot	Jacob Springer*
Carter Bankston	Tyler Pistorio	Sion Harrington	Tony Brown
Ian Blake	Walter Little	Paul Carothers	Dakare Coston

BANDIT
Kevin Brennan
Elan Nash
Mitchell West

CB
Michael McMorris
Micah Farrar
Caleb Clear

DE	NT	DE
J'arius Warren	Jackson Pittman	Jackson Perkins
Mike Flowers	Dave Tolentino	Denzel Polk
Marcus Edwards	Alefosio Saipaia	Deondrae Williams

CB
Cameron Kinley
Marcus Wiggins
Daniel Taylor

Offense

WR
Mychal Cooper
OR Chance Warren
OJ Davis

SB
CJ Williams*
Tyreek King–El
Travis Brannan OR Garrett Winn*

LT	LG	C	RG	RT
Kendel Wright	David Forney	Ford Higgins	Peter Nestrowitz	Billy Honaker
Justin Self*	Niko Yaramus*	Eric Cal	Niko Yaramus*	Justin Self*
Kurt Stengel	Mike Adzima	OR Justin Self*	T.J. Salu	Joe Goff

SB
Tazh Maloy
OR Keoni-Kordell Makekau
Myles Fells

WR
Ryan Mitchell
Mark Walker
Tanner Matthews

QB
Malcolm Perry
Perry Olsen
Dalen Morris

Key reserves
KO – Bijan Nichols*
J.R. Osborn*

FB
Jamale Carothers
Nelson Smith
Isaac Ruoss

Special teams
PK Bijan Nichols*
Owen White*
P Owen White*
Bijan Nichols*
KR Garrett Winn*
CJ Williams*
PR Garrett Winn*
Jacob Springer*
LS Michael Pifer
Kyle Gibbs
H J.R. Osborn*
Owen White*

Depth Chart 2019
True Freshman
Double Position : *

== Rankings ==
Ranking movements Legend: ██ Increase in ranking ██ Decrease in ranking — = Not ranked RV = Received votes
	Week																
Poll	Pre	1	2	3	4	5	6	7	8	9	10	11	12	13	14	15	Final
AP	—	—	—	—	—	—	—	—	RV	RV	25	21	RV	24	23	21	20
Coaches	—	RV	RV	RV	RV	—	RV	RV	RV	RV	25	21	RV	24	23	21	20
CFP	Not released										24	23	—	—	24	23	Not released

== Game summaries ==
=== Holy Cross ===
Holy Cross Crusaders at Navy Midshipmen

Quarter	1	2	3	4	Total
Crusaders	0	7	0	0	7
Midshipmen	10	14	14	7	45

at Navy-Marine Corps Memorial Stadium, Annapolis, MD

- Date: August 31, 2019
- Game time: 3:30 p.m. EDT
- Game weather: Temperature: 84 °F (29 °C) • Wind: E 10-15 mph • Weather: Blue Skies
- Game attendance: 28,531
- Referee: Hank Johns
- TV announcers (CBSSN): John Sadak (play-by-play), Randy Cross (analyst) & Sheehan Stanwick-Burch (sideline)
- ESPN – Navy rolls past Holy Cross 45–7 in opener /// Box Score, Holy Cross at Navy /// Pregame Notes /// Postgame Notes

Game information

First Quarter

- (10:42) NAVY TD – Nelson Smith 4-yard rush, Bijan Nichols kick
  Drive: 9 plays, 75 yards, 4:18; Navy 7–0
- (05:56) NAVY FG – Bijan Nichols 44-yard field goal
  Drive: 8 plays, 25 yards, 3:08; Navy 10–0

Second Quarter

- (07:29) NAVY TD – CJ Williams 16-yard rush, Bijan Nichols kick
  Drive: 7 plays, 80 yards, 3:52; Navy 17–0
- (01:48) HC TD – Miles Alexander 16-yard rush, Derek Ng kick
  Drive: 12 plays, 75 yards, 5:41; Navy 17–7
- (00:10) NAVY TD – Malcolm Perry 1-yard rush, Bijan Nichols kick
  Drive: 7 plays, 75 yards, 1:38; Navy 24–7

Third Quarter

- (10:56) NAVY TD – Nelson Smith 1-yard rush, Bijan Nichols kick
  Drive: 5 plays, 20 yards, 2:34; Navy 31–7
- (04:27) NAVY TD – Isaac Ruoss 2-yard rush, Bijan Nichols kick
  Drive: 7 plays, 75 yards, 3:25; Navy 38–7

Fourth Quarter

- (14:52) NAVY TD – Nelson Smith 49-yard rush, Bijan Nichols kick
  Drive: 7 plays, 80 yards, 2:12; Navy 45–7

Passing

- HC – Connor Degenhardt: 16/29, 167 yards
- NAVY – Malcolm Perry: 6/9, 103 yards

Rushing

- HC – Miles Alexander: 12 carries, 40 yards, 1 TD
- NAVY – Nelson Smith: 15 carries, 96 yards, 3 TD

Receiving

- HC – Derek Mountain: 4 receptions, 62 yards
- NAVY – Mychal Cooper: 2 receptions, 48 yards

=== East Carolina ===
East Carolina Pirates at Navy Midshipmen

Quarter	1	2	3	4	Total
Pirates	0	3	0	7	10
Midshipmen	14	14	14	0	42

at Navy-Marine Corps Memorial Stadium, Annapolis, MD

- Date: September 14, 2019
- Game time: 3:30 p.m. EDT
- Game weather: Temperature: 79 °F (26 °C) • Wind: S 10-15 mph • Weather: Overcast
- Game attendance: 30,707
- Referee: Charles Lamertina
- TV announcers (CBSSN): John Sadak (play-by-play), Randy Cross (analyst) & Sheehan Stanwick-Burch (sideline)
- ESPN – Perry runs, passes Navy past outclassed East Carolina 42–10 /// Box Score, East Carolina at Navy /// Pregame Notes /// Postgame Notes

Game information

First Quarter

- (11:26) NAVY TD – Malcolm Perry 18-yard rush, Bijan Nichols kick
  Drive: 6 plays, 38 yards, 2:08; Navy 7–0
- (05:46) NAVY TD – Malcolm Perry 11-yard rush, Bijan Nichols kick
  Drive: 8 plays, 65 yards, 3:54; Navy 14–0

Second Quarter

- (13:38) NAVY TD – CJ Williams 29-yard pass from Malcolm Perry, Bijan Nichols kick
  Drive: 10 plays, 85 yards, 5:08; Navy 21–0
- (09:09) ECU FG – Jake Verity 23-yard field goal
  Drive: 11 plays, 69 yards, 4:29; Navy 21–3
- (05:25) NAVY TD – Malcolm Perry 6-yard rush, Bijan Nichols kick
  Drive: 8 plays, 72 yards, 3:44; Navy 28–3

Third Quarter

- (07:53) NAVY TD – Malcolm Perry 1-yard rush, Bijan Nichols kick
  Drive: 14 plays, 75 yards, 7:07; Navy 35–3
- (06:34) NAVY TD – CJ Williams 80-yard pass from Malcolm Perry, Bijan Nichols kick
  Drive: 1 play, 80 yards, 0:12; Navy 42–3

Fourth Quarter

- (12:30) ECU TD – Holton Ahlers 2-yard rush, Jake Verity kick
  Drive: 8 plays, 50 yards, 2:46; Navy 42–10

Passing

- ECU – Holton Ahlers: 11/23, 138 yards, 1 INT
- NAVY – Malcolm Perry: 5/7, 151 yards, 2 TD

Rushing

- ECU – Holton Ahlers: 9 carries, 36 yards, 1 TD
- NAVY – Malcolm Perry: 24 carries, 156 yards, 4 TD

Receiving

- ECU – Tyler Snead: 3 receptions, 54 yards
- NAVY – C.J. Williams: 3 receptions, 117 yards, 2 TD

=== At Memphis ===
Navy Midshipmen at Memphis Tigers

Quarter	1	2	3	4	Total
Midshipmen	13	7	0	3	23
Tigers	7	7	14	7	35

at Liberty Bowl Memorial Stadium, Memphis, TN

- Date: September 26, 2019
- Game time: 7:00 p.m. CDT
- Game weather: Temperature: 79 °F (26 °C) • Wind: Calm • Weather: Mostly Cloudy
- Game attendance: 33,909
- Referee: Mike Roche
- TV announcers (ESPN): Adam Amin (play-by-play), Matt Hasselbeck (analyst), Pat McAfee (analyst) & Molly McGrath (sideline)
- ESPN – Memphis remains undefeated with a 35–23 win over Navy /// Box Score, Navy at Memphis /// Pregame Notes /// Postgame Notes

Game information

First Quarter

- (09:55) NAVY TD – Malcolm Perry 1-yard rush, Bijan Nichols kick
  Drive: 10 plays, 75 yards, 5:05; Navy 7–0
- (09:43) MEM TD – Kenneth Gainwell 75-yard rush, Riley Patterson kick
  Drive: 1 play, 75 yards, 0:12; Tied 7–7
- (00:44) NAVY TD – Chance Warren 17-yard pass from Malcolm Perry, Bijan Nichols kick failed
  Drive: 10 plays, 86 yards, 4:59; Navy 13–7

Second Quarter

- (07:01) NAVY TD – Malcolm Perry 1-yard rush, Bijan Nichols kick
  Drive: 10 plays, 74 yards, 4:43; Navy 20–7
- (06:48) MEM TD – Gabriel Rogers 99-yard kickoff return, Riley Patterson kick
  Drive: 0 plays, 0 yards, 0:00; Navy 20–14

Third Quarter

- (09:05) MEM TD – Kedarian Jones 5-yard pass from Brady White, Riley Patterson kick
  Drive: 6 plays, 50 yards, 3:10; Memphis 21–20
- (03:37) MEM TD – Antonio Gibson 73-yard pass from Brady White, Riley Patterson kick
  Drive: 3 plays, 70 yards, 1:45; Memphis 28–20

Fourth Quarter

- (12:17) NAVY FG – Bijan Nichols 49-yard field goal
  Drive: 12 plays, 47 yards, 6:16; Memphis 28–23
- (11:27) MEM TD – Damonte Coxie 31-yard pass from Brady White, Riley Patterson kick
  Drive: 4 plays, 59 yards, 0:41; Memphis 35–23

Passing

- NAVY – Malcolm Perry: 6/10, 82 yards, 1 TD
- MEM – Brady White: 14/18, 196 yards, 3 TD

Rushing

- NAVY – Keoni-Kordell Makekau: 8 carries, 101 yards
- MEM – Kenneth Gainwell: 14 carries, 104 yards, 1 TD

Receiving

- NAVY – Ryan Mitchell: 2 receptions, 52 yards
- MEM – Antonio Gibson: 3 receptions, 105 yards, 1 TD

=== Air Force ===
Air Force Falcons at Navy Midshipmen

Quarter	1	2	3	4	Total
Falcons	3	3	3	16	25
Midshipmen	0	14	7	13	34

at Navy-Marine Corps Memorial Stadium, Annapolis, MD

- Date: October 5, 2019
- Game time: 3:30 p.m. EDT
- Game weather: Temperature: 64 °F (18 °C) • Wind: E 5-10 mph • Weather: Partly Cloudy
- Game attendance: 37,957
- Referee: Michael VanderVelde
- TV announcers (CBSSN): John Sadak (play-by-play), Randy Cross (analyst) & Sheehan Stanwick-Burch (sideline)
- ESPN – Navy stuns Air Force 34–25 /// Box Score, Air Force at Navy /// Pregame Notes /// Postgame Notes

Game information

First Quarter

- (03:09) AF FG – Jake Koehnke 42-yard field goal
  Drive: 4 plays, 8 yards, 2:14; Air Force 3–0

Second Quarter

- (13:24) NAVY TD – Nelson Smith 1-yard rush, Bijan Nichols kick
  Drive: 5 plays, 64 yards, 1:44; Navy 7–3
- (07:39) NAVY TD – Nelson Smith 3-yard rush, Bijan Nichols kick
  Drive: 8 plays, 66 yards, 3:52; Navy 14–3
- (02:17) AF FG – Jake Koehnke 40-yard field goal
  Drive: 13 plays, 53 yards, 5:22; Navy 14–6

Third Quarter

- (12:34) AF FG – Jake Koehnke 49-yard field goal
  Drive: 6 plays, 39 yards, 2:26; Navy 14–9
- (06:36) NAVY TD – Malcolm Perry 20-yard rush, Bijan Nichols kick
  Drive: 5 plays, 44 yards, 2:17; Navy 21–9

Fourth Quarter

- (13:26) AF FG – Jake Koehnke 26-yard field goal
  Drive: 8 plays, 68 yards, 3:16; Navy 21–12
- (07:38) AF TD – Donald Hammond III 1-yard rush, Jake Koehnke kick
  Drive: 8 plays, 37 yards, 3:48; Navy 21–19
- (03:15) AF TD – Taven Birdow 1-yard rush, Donald Hammond III pass failed
  Drive: 6 plays, 72 yards, 2:42; Air Force 25–21
- (00:23) NAVY TD – Malcolm Perry 3-yard rush, Bijan Nichols kick
  Drive: 11 plays, 75 yards, 2:52; Navy 28–25
- (00:00) NAVY TD – Tony Brown 8-yard fumble return
  Drive: 0 plays, 0 yards, 0:00; Navy 34–25

Passing

- AF – Donald Hammond III: 10/25, 205 yards, 1 INT
- NAVY – Malcolm Perry: 5/7, 144 yards

Rushing

- AF – Donald Hammond III: 12 carries, 77 yards, 1 TD
- NAVY – Malcolm Perry: 23 carries, 111 yards, 2 TD

Receiving

- AF – Benjamin Walters: 4 receptions, 128 yards
- NAVY – Mychal Cooper: 3 receptions, 90 yards

=== At Tulsa ===
Navy Midshipmen at Tulsa Golden Hurricane

Quarter	1	2	3	4	Total
Midshipmen	7	21	0	17	45
Golden Hurricane	3	0	7	7	17

at H. A. Chapman Stadium, Tulsa, OK

- Date: October 12, 2019
- Game time: 6:30 p.m. CDT
- Game weather: Temperature: 65 °F (18 °C) • Wind: S 9 mph • Weather: Sunny
- Game attendance: 17,951
- Referee: Adam Savoie
- TV announcers (ESPNU): Mike Corey (play-by-play) & Rene Ingoglia (analyst)
- ESPN – Perry leads Navy over Tulsa 45–17 /// Box Score, Navy at Tulsa /// Pregame Notes /// Postgame Notes

Game information

First Quarter

- (07:29) TLS FG – Jacob Rainey 41-yard field goal
  Drive: 11 plays, 36 yards, 4:06; Tulsa 3–0
- (00:09) NAVY TD – Malcolm Perry 29-yard rush, Bijan Nichols kick
  Drive: 5 plays, 48 yards, 2:26; Navy 7–3

Second Quarter

- (09:06) NAVY TD – CJ Williams 6-yard rush, Bijan Nichols kick
  Drive: 10 plays, 77 yards, 4:37; Navy 14–3
- (06:02) NAVY TD – Nelson Smith 6-yard rush, Bijan Nichols kick
  Drive: 3 plays, 58 yards, 1:11; Navy 21–3
- (02:11) NAVY TD – Malcolm Perry 35-yard rush, Bijan Nichols kick
  Drive: 4 plays, 72 yards, 1:35; Navy 28–3

Third Quarter

- (12:18) TLS TD – Corey Taylor II 1-yard rush, Jacob Rainey kick
  Drive: 9 plays, 75 yards, 2:42; Navy 28–10

Fourth Quarter

- (12:54) NAVY TD – Malcolm Perry 3-yard rush, Bijan Nichols kick
  Drive: 6 plays, 50 yards, 2:48; Navy 35–10
- (06:18) TLS TD – T.K. Wilkerson 12-yard pass from Zach Smith, Jacob Rainey kick
  Drive: 12 plays, 98 yards, 3:46; Navy 35–17
- (03:47) NAVY FG – Bijan Nichols 37-yard field goal
  Drive: 5 plays, 27 yards, 2:28; Navy 38–17
- (02:12) NAVY TD – Jamale Carothers 19-yard rush, Bijan Nichols kick
  Drive: 2 plays, 17 yards, 0:37; Navy 45–17

Passing

- NAVY – CJ Williams: 1/1, 26 yards
- TLS – Zach Smith: 23/48, 254 yards, 1 TD

Rushing

- NAVY – Malcolm Perry: 20 carries, 218 yards, 3 TD
- TLS – Shamari Brooks: 12 carries, 55 yards

Receiving

- NAVY – Jamale Carothers: 1 reception, 26 yards
- TLS – Juan Carlos Santana: 9 receptions, 98 yards

=== South Florida ===
South Florida Bulls at Navy Midshipmen

Quarter	1	2	3	4	Total
Bulls	0	3	0	0	3
Midshipmen	7	14	0	14	35

at Navy-Marine Corps Memorial Stadium, Annapolis, MD

- Date: October 19, 2019
- Game time: 3:30 p.m. EDT
- Game weather: Temperature: 62 °F (17 °C) • Wind: SE 10-15 mph • Weather: Mostly Sunny, Breezy
- Game attendance: 29,774
- Referee: Edwin Lee
- TV announcers (CBSSN): John Sadak (play-by-play), Randy Cross (analyst) & Sheehan Stanwick-Burch (sideline)
- ESPN – Navy runs over South Florida 35–3; Perry joins elite company /// Box Score, South Florida at Navy /// Pregame Notes /// Postgame Notes

Game information

First Quarter

- (03:56) NAVY TD – Malcolm Perry 67-yard rush, Bijan Nichols kick
  Drive: 8 plays, 91 yards, 3:51; Navy 7–0

Second Quarter

- (14:50) NAVY TD – Jamale Carothers 58-yard rush, Bijan Nichols kick
  Drive: 3 plays, 67 yards, 1:01; Navy 14–0
- (10:03) NAVY TD – OJ Davis 23-yard pass from CJ Williams, Bijan Nichols kick
  Drive: 9 plays, 59 yards, 3:53; Navy 21–0
- (02:43) USF FG – Spencer Shrader 33-yard field goal
  Drive: 4 plays, 5 yards, 2:03; Navy 21–3

Third Quarter
No scoring
Fourth Quarter

- (13:03) NAVY TD – Malcolm Perry 21-yard rush, Bijan Nichols kick
  Drive: 8 plays, 76 yards, 3:26; Navy 28–3
- (06:50) NAVY TD – Tazh Maloy 26-yard rush, Bijan Nichols kick
  Drive: 10 plays, 80 yards, 4:55; Navy 35–3

Passing

- USF – Kirk Rygol: 4/7, 64 yards
- NAVY – CJ Williams: 1/1, 23 yards, 1 TD

Rushing

- USF – Jordan Cronkrite: 17 carries, 76 yards
- NAVY – Malcolm Perry: 22 carries, 188 yards, 2 TD

Receiving

- USF – Jacob Mathis: 2 receptions, 34 yards
- NAVY – OJ Davis: 1 reception, 23 yards, 1 TD

=== Tulane ===
Tulane Green Wave at Navy Midshipmen

Quarter	1	2	3	4	Total
Green Wave	0	14	14	10	38
Midshipmen	21	10	0	10	41

at Navy-Marine Corps Memorial Stadium, Annapolis, MD

- Date: October 26, 2019
- Game time: 3:30 p.m. EDT
- Game weather: Temperature: 64 °F (18 °C) • Wind: E 5-10 mph • Weather: Partly Cloudy
- Game attendance: 31,118
- Referee: Mike Roche
- TV announcers (CBSSN): John Sadak (play-by-play), Randy Cross (analyst) & Sheehan Stanwick-Burch (sideline)
- ESPN – Nichols' 48-yard field goal lifts Navy past Tulane, 41–38 /// Box Score, Tulane at Navy /// Pregame Notes /// Postgame Notes

Game information

First Quarter

- (11:49) NAVY TD – Jamale Carothers 52-yard rush, Bijan Nichols kick
  Drive: 8 plays, 75 yards, 3:11; Navy 7–0
- (05:09) NAVY TD – Jamale Carothers 35-yard rush, Bijan Nichols kick
  Drive: 10 plays, 82 yards, 5:14; Navy 14–0
- (00:17) NAVY TD – Jamale Carothers 31-yard pass from Malcolm Perry, Bijan Nichols kick
  Drive: 7 plays, 83 yards, 3:18; Navy 21–0

Second Quarter

- (09:40) NAVY FG – Bijan Nichols 31-yard field goal
  Drive: 7 plays, 58 yards, 4:00; Navy 24–0
- (07:45) TLN TD – Justin McMillan 1-yard rush, Merek Glover kick
  Drive: 5 plays, 79 yards, 1:55; Navy 24–7
- (04:19) TLN TD – Darnell Mooney 22-yard pass from Justin McMillan, Merek Glover kick
  Drive: 3 plays, 72 yards, 0:54; Navy 24–14
- (02:03) NAVY TD – Diego Fagot 17-yard interception return, Bijan Nichols kick
  Drive: 0 plays, 0 yards, 0:00; Navy 31–14

Third Quarter

- (07:43) TLN TD – Jaetavian Toles 5-yard pass from Justin McMillan, Merek Glover kick
  Drive: 7 plays, 46 yards, 3:08; Navy 31–21
- (01:59) TLN TD – Ygenio Booker 2-yard pass from Justin McMillan, Merek Glover kick
  Drive: 9 plays, 39 yards, 4:20; Navy 31–28

Fourth Quarter

- (10:17) TLN FG – Merek Glover 39-yard field goal
  Drive: 11 plays, 68 yards, 5:16; Tied 31–31
- (05:23) NAVY TD – Jamale Carothers 15-yard rush, Bijan Nichols kick
  Drive: 10 plays, 75 yards, 4:54; Navy 38–31
- (01:01) TLN TD – Justin McMillan 1-yard rush, Merek Glover kick
  Drive: 12 plays, 77 yards, 4:23; Tied 38–38
- (00:00) NAVY FG – Bijan Nichols 48-yard field goal
  Drive: 7 plays, 44 yards, 1:01; Navy 41–38

Passing

- TLN – Justin McMillan: 20/29, 290 yards, 3 TD, 2 INT
- NAVY – Malcolm Perry: 2/7, 68 yards, 1 TD, 1 INT

Rushing

- TLN – Cameron Carroll: 8 carries, 71 yards
- NAVY – Jamale Carothers: 14 carries, 154 yards, 3 TD

Receiving

- TLN – Darnell Mooney: 5 receptions, 112 yards, 1 TD
- NAVY – Mychal Cooper: 1 reception, 37 yards

=== At UConn ===
Navy Midshipmen at UConn Huskies

Quarter	1	2	3	4	Total
Midshipmen	14	14	14	14	56
Huskies	7	3	0	0	10

at Rentschler Field, East Hartford, CT

- Date: November 1, 2019
- Game time: 8:00 p.m. EDT
- Game weather: Temperature: 41 °F (5 °C) • Wind: NW 11 mph • Weather: Husky Weather
- Game attendance: 16,659
- Referee: Anthony Calabrese
- TV announcers (ESPN2): Dave LaMont (play-by-play), Jim Mora (analyst) & Paul Carcaterra (sideline)
- ESPN – Midshipmen stay afloat in AAC title race with rout of UConn /// Box Score, Navy at UConn /// Pregame Notes /// Postgame Notes

Game information

First Quarter

- (11:34) NAVY TD – Malcolm Perry 58-yard rush, Bijan Nichols kick
  Drive: 3 plays, 64 yards, 1:16; Navy 7–0
- (08:44) UCONN TD – Art Thompkins 10-yard pass from Jack Zergiotis, Clayton Harris kick
  Drive: 5 plays, 73 yards, 2:50; Tied 7–7
- (02:27) NAVY TD – Jamale Carothers 13-yard rush, Bijan Nichols kick
  Drive: 6 plays, 49 yards, 2:44; Navy 14–7

Second Quarter

- (13:31) UCONN FG – Clayton Harris 40-yard field goal
  Drive: 9 plays, 48 yards, 3:56; Navy 14–10
- (08:31) NAVY TD – Nelson Smith 1-yard rush, Bijan Nichols kick
  Drive: 11 plays, 78 yards, 5:00; Navy 21–10
- (04:49) NAVY TD – Mychal Cooper 58-yard pass from Malcolm Perry, Bijan Nichols kick
  Drive: 1 play, 58 yards, 0:08; Navy 28–10

Third Quarter

- (10:04) NAVY TD – Malcolm Perry 2-yard rush, Bijan Nichols kick
  Drive: 3 plays, 80 yards, 1:16; Navy 35–10
- (05:13) NAVY TD – Jamale Carothers 23-yard rush, Bijan Nichols kick
  Drive: 5 plays, 71 yards, 2:23; Navy 42–10

Fourth Quarter

- (13:51) NAVY TD – Jamale Carothers 6-yard rush, Bijan Nichols kick
  Drive: 2 plays, 87 yards, 0:34; Navy 49–10
- (03:16) NAVY TD – Perry Olsen 1-yard rush, Bijan Nichols kick
  Drive: 15 plays, 94 yards, 8:00; Navy 56–10

Passing

- NAVY – Malcolm Perry: 3/6, 165 yards, 1 TD
- UCONN – Jack Zergiotis: 16/34, 205 yards, 1 TD, 2 INT

Rushing

- NAVY – Malcolm Perry: 11 carries, 108 yards, 2 TD
- UCONN – Kevin Mensah: 26 carries, 107 yards

Receiving

- NAVY – Ryan Mitchell: 1 reception, 74 yards
- UCONN – Cameron Hairston: 1 reception, 53 yards

=== At Notre Dame ===
Battle for the Rip Miller Trophy: No. 23 Navy Midshipmen at No. 16 Notre Dame Fighting Irish

Quarter	1	2	3	4	Total
No. 23 Midshipmen	0	3	7	10	20
No. 16 Fighting Irish	14	24	7	7	52

at Notre Dame Stadium, South Bend, IN

- Date: November 16, 2019
- Game time: 2:30 p.m. EST
- Game weather: Temperature: 37 °F (3 °C) • Wind: E 8 mph • Weather: Clear Skies
- Game attendance: 74,080
- Referee: Charles Lamertina
- TV announcers (NBC): Mike Tirico (play-by-play), Doug Flutie (analyst), Kathryn Tappen (sideline), Chris Simms (field analyst) & Terry McAulay (rules analyst)
- ESPN – Claypool catches 4 TDs as No. 16 Notre Dame rout Navy 52–20 /// Box Score, No. 23 Navy at No. 16 Notre Dame /// Pregame Notes /// Postgame Notes

Game information

First Quarter

- (09:39) ND TD – Chase Claypool 7-yard pass from Ian Book, Jonathan Doerer kick
  Drive: 11 plays, 75 yards, 5:21; Notre Dame 7–0
- (03:11) ND TD – Chase Claypool 47-yard pass from Ian Book, Jonathan Doerer kick
  Drive: 2 plays, 73 yards, 0:23; Notre Dame 14–0

Second Quarter

- (12:32) ND TD – Chase Claypool 3-yard pass from Ian Book, Jonathan Doerer kick
  Drive: 4 plays, 39 yards, 1:35; Notre Dame 21–0
- (10:27) ND TD – Braden Lenzy 70-yard pass from Ian Book, Jonathan Doerer kick
  Drive: 1 play, 70 yards, 0:09; Notre Dame 28–0
- (04:45) ND FG – Jonathan Doerer 32-yard field goal
  Drive: 7 plays, 29 yards, 3:23; Notre Dame 31–0
- (01:30) ND TD – Tony Jones Jr. 2-yard rush, Jonathan Doerer kick
  Drive: 8 plays, 24 yards, 2:30; Notre Dame 38–0
- (00:00) NAVY FG – Bijan Nichols 27-yard field goal
  Drive: 9 plays, 72 yards, 1:24; Notre Dame 38–3

Third Quarter

- (09:55) ND TD – Chase Claypool 20-yard pass from Ian Book, Jonathan Doerer kick
  Drive: 7 plays, 78 yards, 2:09; Notre Dame 45–3
- (01:42) NAVY TD – Mychal Cooper 43-yard pass from Perry Olsen, Bijan Nichols kick
  Drive: 7 plays, 74 yards, 3:36; Notre Dame 45–10

Fourth Quarter

- (14:39) ND TD – Paul Moala 27-yard fumble return, Jonathan Doerer kick
  Drive: 0 plays, 0 yards, 0:00; Notre Dame 52–10
- (05:31) NAVY TD – Perry Olsen 2-yard rush, Bijan Nichols kick
  Drive: 18 plays, 75 yards, 9:08; Notre Dame 52–17
- (01:18) NAVY FG – Bijan Nichols 36-yard field goal
  Drive: 6 plays, 25 yards, 2:01; Notre Dame 52–20

Passing

- NAVY – Perry Olsen: 1/5, 43 yards, 1 TD
- ND – Ian Book: 14/20, 284 yards, 5 TD

Rushing

- NAVY – Malcolm Perry: 25 carries, 117 yards
- ND – Ian Book: 5 carries, 31 yards

Receiving

- NAVY – Mychal Cooper: 3 receptions, 73 yards, 1 TD
- ND – Chase Claypool: 7 receptions, 117 yards, 4 TD

=== SMU ===
No. 25 SMU Mustangs at Navy Midshipmen

Quarter	1	2	3	4	Total
No. 25 Mustangs	7	14	0	7	28
Midshipmen	7	3	10	15	35

at Navy-Marine Corps Memorial Stadium, Annapolis, MD

- Date: November 23, 2019
- Game time: 3:30 p.m. EST
- Game weather: Temperature: 43 °F (6 °C) • Wind: S 3-5 mph • Weather: Overcast Skies
- Game attendance: 33,732
- Referee: Mike Roche
- TV announcers (CBSSN): John Sadak (play-by-play), Randy Cross (analyst) & Sheehan Stanwick-Burch (sideline)
- ESPN – Perry leads Navy past No. 21 SMU 35–28 /// Box Score, No. 25 SMU at Navy /// Pregame Notes /// Postgame Notes

Game information

First Quarter

- (02:36) NAVY TD – Chance Warren 22-yard rush, Bijan Nichols kick
  Drive: 8 plays, 65 yards, 3:28; Navy 7–0
- (02:21) SMU TD – CJ Sanders 100-yard kickoff return, Kevin Robledo kick
  Drive: 0 plays, 0 yards, 0:00; Tied 7–7

Second Quarter

- (11:44) NAVY FG – Bijan Nichols 41-yard field goal
  Drive: 11 plays, 51 yards, 5:37; Navy 10–7
- (06:22) SMU TD – James Proche 8-yard pass from Shane Buechele, Kevin Robledo kick
  Drive: 12 plays, 75 yards, 5:22; SMU 14–10
- (04:01) SMU TD – Xavier Jones 9-yard rush, Kevin Robledo kick
  Drive: 2 plays, 42 yards, 0:22; SMU 21–10

Third Quarter

- (08:58) NAVY TD – Malcolm Perry 1-yard rush, Bijan Nichols kick
  Drive: 13 plays, 75 yards, 6:02; SMU 21–17
- (04:04) NAVY FG – Bijan Nichols 24-yard field goal
  Drive: 9 plays, 73 yards, 4:22; SMU 21–20

Fourth Quarter

- (14:19) NAVY TD – Ryan Mitchell 13-yard pass from Malcolm Perry, CJ Williams pass
  Drive: 10 plays, 76 yards, 3:48; Navy 28–21
- (12:14) SMU TD – Rashee Rice 61-yard pass from Shane Buechele, Kevin Robledo kick
  Drive: 6 plays, 85 yards, 2:05; Tied 28–28
- (06:11) NAVY TD – Malcolm Perry 70-yard rush, Bijan Nichols kick
  Drive: 3 plays, 70 yards, 0:50; Navy 35–28

Passing

- SMU – Shane Buechele: 16/28, 251 yards, 2 TD
- NAVY – Malcolm Perry: 9/15, 162 yards, 1 TD

Rushing

- SMU – Xavier Jones: 18 carries, 61 yards, 1 TD
- NAVY – Malcolm Perry: 38 carries, 195 yards, 2 TD

Receiving

- SMU – Rashee Rice: 3 receptions, 76 yards, 1 TD
- NAVY – Ryan Mitchell: 3 receptions, 48 yards, 1 TD

=== At Houston ===
Navy Midshipmen at Houston Cougars

Quarter	1	2	3	4	Total
Midshipmen	21	7	14	14	56
Cougars	14	13	7	7	41

at TDECU Stadium, Houston, TX

- Date: November 30, 2019
- Game time: 6:00 p.m. CST
- Game weather: Temperature: 77 °F (25 °C) • Wind: SW 9 mph • Weather: Partly Cloudy
- Game attendance: 22,824
- Referee: Edwin Lee
- TV announcers (ESPN2): Mike Morgan (play-by-play), Andre Ware (analyst) & Taylor Davis (sideline)
- ESPN – Jamale Carothers helps No. 24 Navy beat Houston 56–41 /// Box Score, Navy at Houston /// Pregame Notes /// Postgame Notes

Game information

First Quarter

- (13:31) HOU TD – Tre'von Bradley 67-yard pass from Clayton Tune, Dalton Witherspoon kick
  Drive: 3 plays, 75 yards, 1:29; Houston 7–0
- (09:21) NAVY TD – Jamale Carothers 8-yard rush, Bijan Nichols kick
  Drive: 8 plays, 75 yards, 4:10; Tied 7–7
- (07:32) NAVY TD – Jamale Carothers 17-yard rush, Bijan Nichols kick
  Drive: 4 plays, 28 yards, 1:49; Navy 14–7
- (02:13) HOU TD – Patrick Carr 5-yard rush, Dalton Witherspoon kick
  Drive: 10 plays, 75 yards, 5:19; Tied 14–14
- (01:34) NAVY TD – Malcolm Perry 15-yard rush, Bijan Nichols kick
  Drive: 2 plays, 75 yards, 0:39; Navy 21–14

Second Quarter

- (13:32) HOU TD – Marquez Stevenson 5-yard pass from Clayton Tune, Dalton Witherspoon kick
  Drive: 6 plays, 75 yards, 3:02; Tied 21–21
- (09:38) NAVY TD – CJ Williams 3-yard rush, Bijan Nichols kick
  Drive: 3 plays, 3 yards, 1:29; Navy 28–21
- (06:44) HOU FG – Dalton Witherspoon 27-yard field goal
  Drive: 6 plays, 59 yards, 2:54; Navy 28–24
- (01:04) HOU FG – Dalton Witherspoon 29-yard field goal
  Drive: 8 plays, 40 yards, 3:43; Navy 28–27

Third Quarter

- (14:49) NAVY TD – Jamale Carothers 75-yard rush, Bijan Nichols kick
  Drive: 1 play, 75 yards, 0:11; Navy 35–27
- (05:48) HOU TD – Courtney Lark 26-yard pass from Clayton Tune, Dalton Witherspoon kick
  Drive: 3 plays, 29 yards, 0:54; Navy 35–34
- (02:06) NAVY TD – Jamale Carothers 29-yard rush, Bijan Nichols kick
  Drive: 7 plays, 75 yards, 3:42; Navy 42–34

Fourth Quarter

- (09:52) NAVY TD – Tyreek King-El 18-yard rush, Bijan Nichols kick
  Drive: 8 plays, 80 yards, 4:04; Navy 49–34
- (05:50) HOU TD – Marquez Stevenson 22-yard pass from Clayton Tune, Dalton Witherspoon kick
  Drive: 10 plays, 71 yards, 4:02; Navy 49–41
- (03:26) NAVY TD – Jamale Carothers 19-yard rush, Bijan Nichols kick
  Drive: 5 plays, 78 yards, 2:24; Navy 56–41

Passing

- NAVY – Malcolm Perry: 2/4, 107 yards
- HOU – Clayton Tune: 23/35, 393 yards, 4 TD, 4 INT

Rushing

- NAVY – Jamale Carothers: 18 carries, 188 yards, 5 TD
- HOU – Clayton Tune: 11 carries, 61 yards

Receiving

- NAVY – Keoni-Kordell Makekau: 1 reception, 60 yards
- HOU – Marquez Stevenson: 8 receptions, 133 yards, 2 TD

=== Vs. Army ===
Army Black Knights vs. No. 23 Navy Midshipmen (120th Army–Navy Game)

Quarter	1	2	3	4	Total
Black Knights	7	0	0	0	7
No. 23 Midshipmen	0	14	7	10	31

at Lincoln Financial Field, Philadelphia, PA

- Date: December 14, 2019
- Game time: 3:00 p.m. EST
- Game weather: Temperature: 55 °F (13 °C) • Wind: S 10-15 mph • Weather: Light Drizzle
- Game attendance: 68,705
- Referee: Mike Roche
- TV announcers (CBS): Brad Nessler (play-by-play), Gary Danielson (analyst) & Jamie Erdahl (sideline)
- ESPN – Sea, by ground: Perry runs for 304 in Navy rout /// Box Score, Army vs. No. 23 Navy /// Pregame Notes /// Postgame Notes

Game information

First Quarter

- (00:27) ARMY TD – Christian Anderson 5-yard rush, David Cooper kick
  Drive: 18 plays, 78 yards, 10:41; Army 7–0

Second Quarter

- (13:34) NAVY TD – Malcolm Perry 55-yard rush, Bijan Nichols kick
  Drive: 4 plays, 75 yards, 1:53; Tied 7–7
- (00:06) NAVY TD – Jamale Carothers 1-yard pass from Chance Warren, Bijan Nichols kick
  Drive: 12 plays, 91 yards, 4:36; Navy 14–7

Third Quarter

- (04:53) NAVY TD – Jamale Carothers 5-yard rush, Bijan Nichols kick
  Drive: 7 plays, 45 yards, 3:53; Navy 21–7

Fourth Quarter

- (12:48) NAVY FG – Bijan Nichols 37-yard field goal
  Drive: 9 plays, 40 yards, 5:27; Navy 24–7
- (01:42) NAVY TD – Malcolm Perry 15-yard rush, Bijan Nichols kick
  Drive: 6 plays, 47 yards, 3:17; Navy 31-7

Passing

- ARMY – Christian Anderson: 2/4, 18 yards
- NAVY – Chance Warren: 1/1, 1 yard, 1 TD

Rushing

- ARMY – Christian Anderson: 21 carries, 56 yards, 1 TD
- NAVY – Malcolm Perry: 29 carries, 304 yards, 2 TD

Receiving

- ARMY – Cam Harrison: 2 receptions, 18 yards
- NAVY – Jamale Carothers: 1 reception, 1 yard, 1 TD

Navy Midshipmen quarterback Malcolm Perry made Naval Academy history by setting the single season rushing mark with 1,804 yards, surpassing Napoleon McCallum who held the record since 1983 with 1,587 yards. Perry also became Navy's single season record holder in total offense with 2,831 yards. As well as becoming the career leading rusher in the Army–Navy Game and had the most rushing yards in a single game in the series. Perry earned MVP game honors, becoming the 4th quarterback in FBS history to rush for 300 yards. He had 304 yards with 2 touchdowns on his record-breaking day. Navy coach Ken Niumatalolo became the winningest coach in Army–Navy Game history with nine wins.

=== Vs. Kansas State (Liberty Bowl) ===
AutoZone Liberty Bowl: No. 23 Navy Midshipmen vs. Kansas State Wildcats

Quarter	1	2	3	4	Total
No. 23 Midshipmen	3	7	7	3	20
Wildcats	0	10	0	7	17

at Liberty Bowl Memorial Stadium, Memphis, TN

- Date: December 31, 2019
- Game time: 2:45 p.m. CST
- Game weather: Temperature: 50 °F (10 °C) • Wind: SW 10 MPH • Weather: Clear
- Game attendance: 50,515
- Referee: Tra Blake
- TV announcers (ESPN): Roy Philpott (play-by-play), Kelly Stouffer (analyst) & Lauren Sisler (sideline)
- ESPN – 2019 Liberty Bowl, No. 23 Navy Midshipmen vs. Kansas State Wildcats, Preview /// Pregame Notes

Game information

First Quarter
Second Quarter
Third Quarter
Fourth Quarter

Passing

- NAVY – Malcolm Perry: 5/7, 57 yards, TD
- KSU – Skylar Thompson: 10/14, 124 yards,

Rushing

- NAVY – Malcolm Perry: 28 carries, 213 yards
- KSU – Gilbert James: 8 carries, 39 yards

Receiving

- NAVY – Chance Warren: 1 reception, 41 yards, TD
- KSU – Wykeen Gill: 2 receptions, 57 yards

Navy and Kansas State both accepted initiations to the Liberty Bowl. This was the first meeting between the two teams. Kansas State improved its regular season record from 5-7 in 2018 to 8-4 and the Navy Midshipmen improved from 3-10 in 2018 to 10-2. Navy averaged 363.7 yards rushing per game – 66 more than any other FBS team.

The Navy Midshipmen became the Auto Zone Liberty Bowl Champions. Malcolm Perry was named the Liberty Bowl MVP "Player of the Game". He was 5/7, 57 passing yards and a touchdown, with 213 rushing yards in 28 attempts. Perry also set the FBS single-season rushing record for a quarterback with 1,923 (13 games), becoming the all-time rushing leader. He edged out Northern Illinois' Jordan Lynch who rushed for 1,920 yards in 2013 (14 games). Navy set a new single-season school record with 228 rush yards in the game, (4,586 rush yards in total). Coach Ken Niumatalolo, named AAC coach of the year, completely turned his team around from a dismal 3-10 record in 2018 to an 11-2 record in 2019; just the second time in Naval Academy history with eleven wins in a season.

Source for Match-up Records:

== Players drafted into the NFL ==
Round	Pick	Player	Position	NFL Club
7	246	Malcolm Perry	QB	Miami Dolphins
