= 2019 Liberty Bowl =

Postseason college football bowl game

2019 AutoZone Liberty Bowl
- 61st Liberty Bowl
Navy Midshipmen	Kansas State Wildcats
(10–2)	(8–4)
The American	Big 12
20	17
Head coach: Ken Niumatalolo	Head coach: Chris Klieman
AP / Coaches / CFP; 21 / 21 / 23
	1	2	3	4	Total
Navy	3	7	7	3	20
Kansas State	0	10	0	7	17
- Date: December 31, 2019
- Season: 2019
- Stadium: Liberty Bowl Memorial Stadium
- Location: Memphis, Tennessee
- MVP: Malcolm Perry (QB, Navy)
- Favorite: Navy by 2
- Referee: Tra Blake (ACC)
- Attendance: 50,515
- Payout: US$4,700,000

United States TV coverage
- Network: ESPN & ESPN Radio
- Announcers: ESPN: Roy Philpott (play-by-play), Kelly Stouffer (analyst) and Lauren Sisler (sideline); ESPN Radio: Bill Roth (play-by-play), Dustin Fox (analyst) and Taylor Davis (sideline)

The 2019 Liberty Bowl was a college football bowl game played on December 31, 2019, with kickoff at 3:45 p.m. EST (2:45 p.m. local CST) on ESPN. It was the 61st edition of the Liberty Bowl, and one of the 2019–20 bowl games concluding the 2019 FBS football season. Sponsored by automotive retailer AutoZone, the game was officially known as the AutoZone Liberty Bowl.

== Teams ==
The game featured the Navy Midshipmen of the American Athletic Conference (AAC) and the Kansas State Wildcats of the Big 12 Conference. This was the first meeting between the two programs.

=== Navy ===
Navy entered the game with a 10–2 record (7–1 in conference), ranked 21st in the AP Poll. The Midshipmen finished tied with Memphis atop the West Division of the AAC; the Tigers advanced to the AAC Championship Game due to their win over Navy in September. Navy faced two ranked FBS teams during the season, defeating SMU and losing to Notre Dame.

Navy averaged 360.82 yards rushing per game during the regular season, 49 yards more than any other FBS team. Their 10 regular season wins, including a December 14 victory in the Army–Navy Game, was a seven-win improvement over their 2018 team that finished 3–10. This was Navy's second Liberty Bowl; their 1981 team appeared in that season's Liberty Bowl, losing to Ohio State, 31–28.

=== Kansas State ===
Kansas State entered the game with an 8–4 record, having recorded three more wins than their 2018 team. They were 5–4 in conference, finishing in a four-way tie for third place in the Big 12. The Wildcats defeated both ranked FBS teams they faced, Oklahoma and Iowa State. Kansas State head coach Chris Klieman previously led North Dakota State to four FCS titles.

During the regular season, the Wildcats allowed only 21.5 points per game and had the third-best passing defense based on passing yardage. Jordan Brown led the offense with 698 yards in only 10 games; as a team, they averaged 189 rushing yards per game. This was Kansas State's second Liberty Bowl; their 2015 team appeared in the 2016 Liberty Bowl, losing to Arkansas, 45–23.

== Game summary ==
2019 AutoZone Liberty Bowl

Quarter	1	2	3	4	Total
No. 23 Navy	3	7	7	3	20
Kansas State	0	10	0	7	17

at Liberty Bowl Memorial Stadium • Memphis, Tennessee

- Date: Tuesday, December 31, 2019
- Game time: 3:45 p.m. EST (2:45 p.m. CST)
- Game weather: Clear • Temperature: 50 °F (10 °C) • Wind: SW 10 mph
- Game attendance: 50,515
- Referee: Tra Blake
- TV announcers (ESPN): Roy Philpott (play-by-play), Kelly Stouffer (analyst) and Lauren Sisler (sideline)
- ESPN game summary

Game information

First Quarter

- (4:26) NAVY – Bijan Nichols 21 yard field goal (Drive: 11 plays, 55 yards, 6:38; Navy 3–0)

Second Quarter

- (13:13) KSU – Phillip Brooks 66 yard punt return, Blake Lynch kick (Kansas State 7–3)
- (9:31) NAVY – Malcolm Perry 27 yard pass to Keoni Makekau, Bijan Nichols kick (Drive: 8 plays, 75 yards, 3:42; Navy 10–7)
- (2:27) KSU – Blake Lynch 39 yard field goal (Drive: 13 plays, 49 yards, 6:59; Tied 10–10)

Third Quarter

- (10:15) NAVY – Chance Warren 20 yard rush, Bijan Nichols kick (Drive: 7 plays, 75 yards, 4:45; Navy 17–10)

Fourth Quarter

- (5:17) KSU – Skylar Thompson 1 yard rush, Blake Lynch kick (Drive: 6 plays, 79 yards, 3:12; Tied 17–17)
- (0:02) NAVY – Bijan Nichols 23 yard field goal (Drive: 13 plays, 70 yards, 5:12; Navy 20–17)

=== Statistics ===
Statistics	NAVY	KSU
First downs	19	10
Plays–yards	63–421	41–170
Rushes–yards	54–323	27–46
Passing yards	98	124
Passing: comp–att–int	6–9–0	10–14–0
Time of possession	36:31	23:29

Team	Category	Player	Statistics
Navy	Passing	Malcolm Perry	5/7, 57 yards, 1 TD
Navy	Rushing	Malcolm Perry	28 carries, 213 yards
Navy	Receiving	Chance Warren	1 reception, 41 yards
Kansas State	Passing	Skylar Thompson	10/14, 124 yards
Kansas State	Rushing	James Gilbert	8 carries, 39 yards
Kansas State	Receiving	Wykeen Gill	2 receptions, 57 yards
