= Chelen Garnes =

American gridiron football player (born 2000)

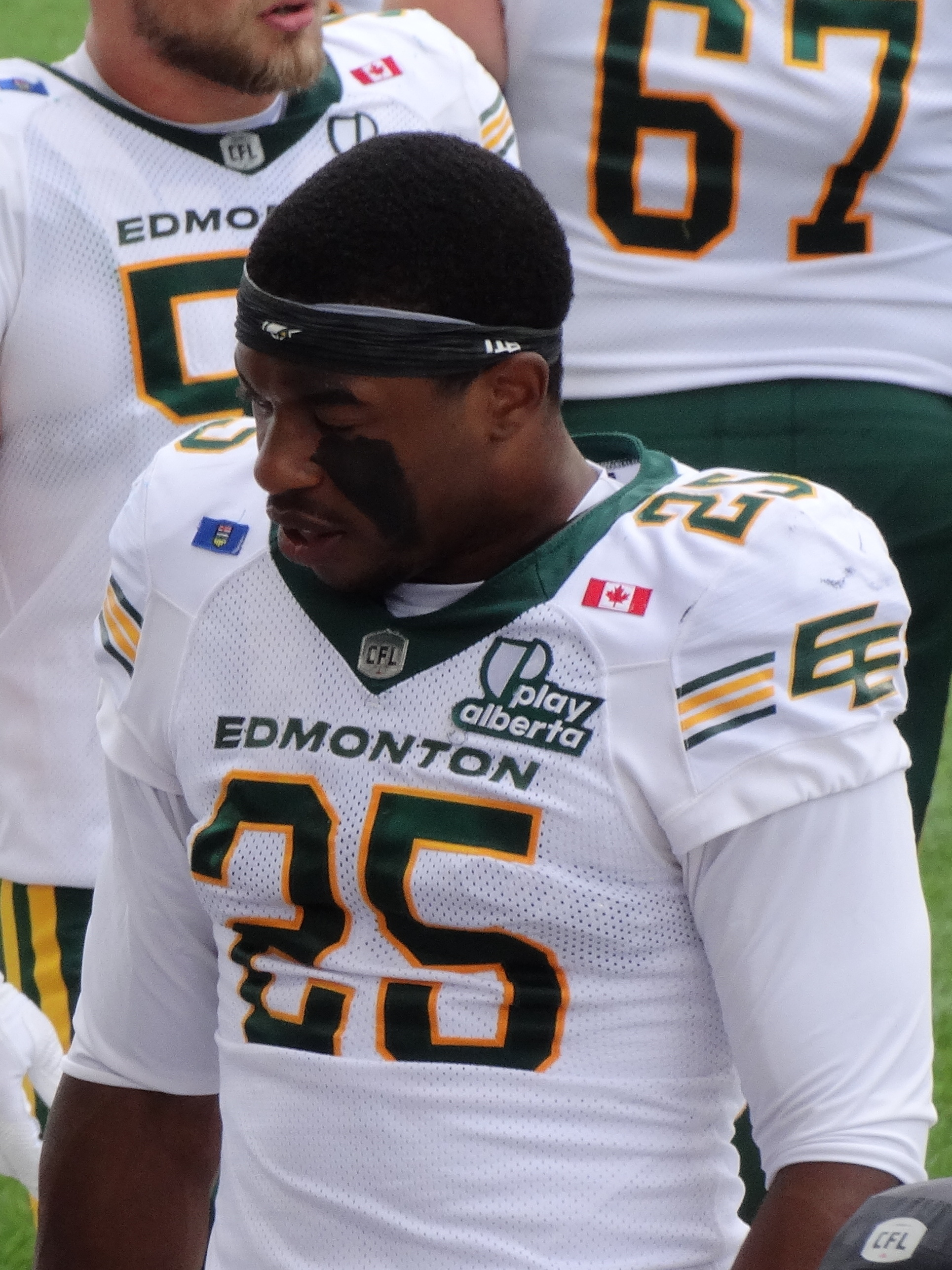
- Garnes with the Edmonton Elks in 2025

No. 25 – Edmonton Elks
- Position: Defensive back
- Roster status: Active
- CFL status: American

Personal information
- Born: September 25, 2000 (age 26)
- Listed height: 5 ft 11 in (1.80 m)
- Listed weight: 207 lb (94 kg)

Career information
- High school: North Point (Waldorf, Maryland)
- College: Navy (2019); Wake Forest (2020–2023)
- NFL draft: 2024: undrafted

Career history
- Detroit Lions (2024)*; Edmonton Elks (2025–present)
- * Offseason or practice squad member only

Awards and highlights
- Grey Cup champion (2026)
- Stats at CFL.ca

Chelen Garnes (born September 25, 2000) is an American professional football defensive back for the Edmonton Elks of the Canadian Football League (CFL). Garnes previously played college football for the Navy Midshipmen and the Wake Forest Demon Deacons. He also had a stint in the National Football League (NFL) with the Detroit Lions.

== College career ==
Garnes played college football for the Navy Midshipmen in 2019 and the Wake Forest Demon Deacons from 2020 to 2023. He played in every game of the season for Navy and recorded a career-high six tackles, along with his first collegiate sack, in a win against Tulsa.

Garnes entered the transfer portal after his freshman year, and committed to Wake Forest. He played in 33 games for the Demon Deacons logging 145 total tackles, 4.5 sacks, one interception, 10 pass breakups and three fumble recoveries. In his final year, he had a season-high nine tackles, including one for a loss, one sack and fumble recovery against NC State.

=== Statistics ===
| Year | Team | Games | Tackles | | | | | Interceptions | | | | Fumbles | | |
| Year | Team | GP | Solo | Ast | Cmb | TfL | Sck | Int | Yds | TD | PD | FR | FF | TD |
|---|---|---|---|---|---|---|---|---|---|---|---|---|---|---|
| 2019 | Navy | 13 | 4 | 7 | 11 | 1 | 0.5 | 2 | 0 | 0 | 1 | 0 | 0 | 0 |
| 2020 | Wake Forest | 1 | 0 | 0 | 0 | 0 | 0.0 | 0 | 0 | 0 | 0 | 0 | 0 | 0 |
| 2021 | Wake Forest | 7 | 10 | 3 | 13 | 3 | 2.0 | 0 | 0 | 0 | 1 | 0 | 0 | 0 |
| 2022 | Wake Forest | 13 | 43 | 28 | 71 | 2 | 1.0 | 1 | 0 | 0 | 3 | 1 | 0 | 0 |
| 2023 | Wake Forest | 12 | 33 | 28 | 61 | 2 | 1.5 | 0 | 0 | 0 | 5 | 2 | 0 | 0 |
| Career | | 46 | 90 | 66 | 156 | 8 | 5.0 | 3 | 0 | 0 | 10 | 3 | 0 | 0 |

== Professional career ==
Pre-draft measurables
| Height | Weight | Arm length | Hand span | Wingspan | 40-yard dash | 10-yard split | 20-yard split | 20-yard shuttle | Three-cone drill | Vertical jump | Broad jump | Bench press |
|---|---|---|---|---|---|---|---|---|---|---|---|---|
| 5 ft 9 3/4 in (1.77 m) | 199 lb (90 kg) | 30 in (0.76 m) | 8 1/2 in (0.22 m) | 6 ft 1 1/8 in (1.86 m) | 4.56 s | 1.58 s | 2.62 s | 4.32 s | 7.03 s | 37.0 in (0.94 m) | 9 ft 10 in (3.00 m) | 18 reps |
All values from Pro Day

=== Detroit Lions ===
After not being selected in the 2024 NFL draft, Garnes signed with the Detroit Lions as an undrafted free agent. He was waived from the team on August 27.

=== Edmonton Elks ===
Garnes signed with the Edmonton Elks on March 7, 2025. He made his CFL debut on June 8 against the BC Lions but didn't record any statistics. Garnes recorded his first tackle on June 20, against the Montreal Alouettes.
