= 2019 Kansas State Wildcats football team =

American college football season

2019 Kansas State Wildcats football

Liberty Bowl, L 17–20 vs. Navy
- Conference: Big 12 Conference
- Record: 8–5 (5–4 Big 12)
- Head coach: Chris Klieman (1st season)
- Offensive coordinator: Courtney Messingham (1st season)
- Offensive scheme: Pro-style
- Defensive coordinator: Scottie Hazelton (1st season)
- Base defense: 4–3
- Home stadium: Bill Snyder Family Football Stadium

Uniform
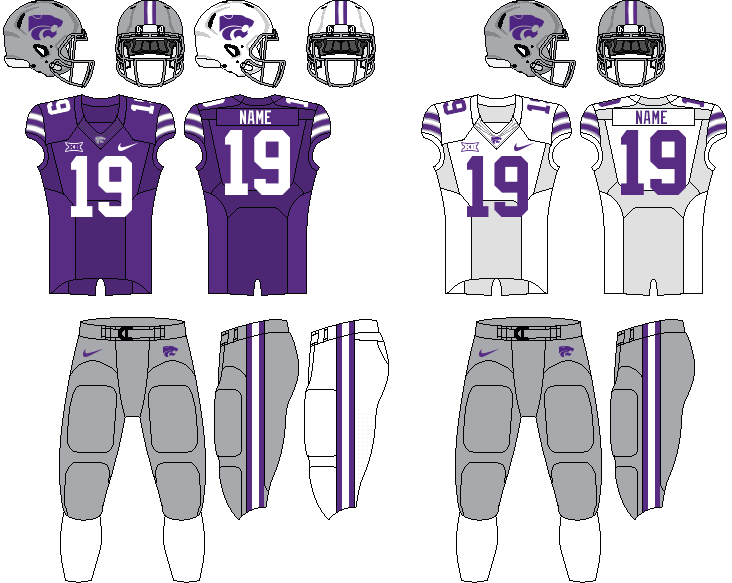

2019 Big 12 Conference football standings
	Conf.			Overall
Team	W		L	W		L
No. 7 Oklahoma y$^	8	–	1	12	–	2
No. 13 Baylor y	8	–	1	11	–	3
No. 25 Texas	5	–	4	8	–	5
Oklahoma State	5	–	4	8	–	5
Kansas State	5	–	4	8	–	5
Iowa State	5	–	4	7	–	6
West Virginia	3	–	6	5	–	7
TCU	3	–	6	5	–	7
Texas Tech	2	–	7	4	–	8
Kansas	1	–	8	3	–	9
Championship: Oklahoma 30, Baylor 23 ^{OT}
^ – College Football Playoff participant; $ – Conference champion; y – Championship game participant; Rankings from AP Poll

The 2019 Kansas State Wildcats football team represented Kansas State University in the 2019 NCAA Division I FBS football season. The Wildcats played their home games at Bill Snyder Family Football Stadium in Manhattan, Kansas, and competed in the Big 12 Conference. They were led by first-year head coach Chris Klieman, who accepted the role after the retirement of long-time head coach Bill Snyder.

== Preseason ==
=== Big 12 media poll ===
The 2019 Big 12 media days were held July 15–16, 2019 in Frisco, Texas. In the Big 12 preseason media poll, Kansas State was predicted to finish in ninth in the standings.

== Schedule ==
Date	Time	Opponent	Rank	Site	TV	Result	Attendance
August 31	6:00 p.m.	No. 12 (FCS) Nicholls*		Bill Snyder Family Football Stadium; Manhattan, KS	ESPN+	W 49–14	51,189
September 7	11:00 a.m.	Bowling Green*		Bill Snyder Family Football Stadium; Manhattan, KS	FSN	W 52–0	46,075
September 14	11:00 a.m.	at Mississippi State*		Davis Wade Stadium; Starkville, MS	ESPN	W 31–24	54,522
September 28	6:00 p.m.	at Oklahoma State	No. 24	Boone Pickens Stadium; Stillwater, OK	ESPN+	L 13–26	55,509
October 5	2:30 p.m.	Baylor		Bill Snyder Family Football Stadium; Manhattan, KS	ESPN2	L 12–31	50,448
October 19	1:30 p.m.	TCU		Bill Snyder Family Football Stadium; Manhattan, KS	FSN	W 24–17	48,298
October 26	11:00 a.m.	No. 5 Oklahoma^{†}		Bill Snyder Family Football Stadium; Manhattan, KS	ABC	W 48–41	50,394
November 2	2:30 p.m.	at Kansas	No. 22	David Booth Kansas Memorial Stadium; Lawrence, KS (rivalry)	FS1	W 38–10	47,233
November 9	2:30 p.m.	at Texas	No. 16	Darrell K Royal–Texas Memorial Stadium; Austin, TX	ESPN	L 24–27	97,833
November 16	2:30 p.m.	West Virginia	No. 24	Bill Snyder Family Football Stadium; Manhattan, KS	ESPN	L 20–24	46,332
November 23	6:00 p.m.	at Texas Tech		Jones AT&T Stadium; Lubbock, TX	FS1	W 30–27	50,117
November 30	6:00 p.m.	No. 23 Iowa State		Bill Snyder Family Football Stadium; Manhattan, KS (rivalry)	FS1	W 27–17	48,990
December 31	2:45 p.m.	vs. No. 23 Navy*		Liberty Bowl Memorial Stadium; Memphis, TN (Liberty Bowl)	ESPN	L 17–20	50,515
*Non-conference game; ^{†}Homecoming; Rankings from AP Poll and CFP Rankings after November 5 released prior to game; All times are in Central time

== Game summaries ==
=== Nicholls ===
	1	2	3	4	Total
No. 12 (FCS) Colonels	0	0	7	7	14
Wildcats	14	14	0	21	49

Kansas State scored touchdowns on their first four possessions and were successful 10 of 12 attempts on third down in 80 offensive plays. Kansas State also managed the clock, being on offense for more than 41 minutes. ESPN Reported: "The Wildcats looked a lot like Klieman's teams at North Dakota State, winning the battle in the trenches and rotating running backs every couple of plays. The result was a team that was fresher and more physical as the game went along."

For Nicholls, this was largely different compared to last year's opener when they defeated the Kansas Jayhawks. The Colonel's Kendall Bussey and Julien Gums both produced second-half touchdown runs to put their team on the board, but it wasn't nearly enough. Despite the loss, Nicholls managed to move up in the FCS coaches poll, going from #11 to #10.

=== Bowling Green ===
	1	2	3	4	Total
Falcons	0	0	0	0	0
Wildcats	17	21	7	7	52

Kansas State's defense set the goal of holding Bowling Green to zero points. They almost missed that goal early in the third quarter, when K-State's Phillip Brooks dropped the first of two punts in the game. That fumble gave Bowling Green possession on the 33-yard line. Then Kansas State linebacker Daniel Green forced a fumble that was recovered by freshman linebacker Khalid Duke. Kansas State continued to hold on defense to meet the goal of holding Bowling Green to zero points.

The Wildcats controlled the game on both offense and defense to secure the win 52–0. This was Kansas State's first shutout in more than four years when they beat South Dakota 34–0 on September 15, 2015. Bowling Green only advanced past midfield three times The shutout was Bowling Green's first since losing 37–0 at Virginia Tech in 2012.

Bowling Green managed 140 total yards (79 passing and 61 rushing) and completed just 8 of 19 passes. Kansas State led 31-0 and put up over 300 yards of total offense before the game was halfway through the second quarter. Kansas State ended up with 521 total yards by the end of the game. It marked the 23 consecutive win for head coach Chris Klieman.

=== At Mississippi State ===
	1	2	3	4	Total
Wildcats	3	14	0	14	31
Bulldogs	0	14	7	3	24

Kansas State completed its first non-conference road win over a "power-conference" opponent since 2011. Leading most of the game, Kansas State found itself trailing for the first time all season late in the third quarter. But early in the fourth quarter, Malik Knowles returned a kickoff 100 yards for a touchdown.

Mississippi State led in almost every statistical category: more first downs (21-17); more total yards (352-269), more yards rushing (201-146), and more yards passing (151-123). Both teams committed 3 turnovers and 7 penalties and Mississippi State controlled the game clock, holding possession for 33:05 to K-States 26:55.

Solid statistical production wasn't enough, as Kansas State ended up winning the game 31–24. The following week, Kansas State was ranked #25 in the Coaches Poll and received votes in the AP Top 25 poll. Mississippi State received votes in both polls but was dropped from the Coaches Poll. After the first three games, the Orlando Sentinel named Kansas State as one of five "surprising starts" for college football teams.

=== At Oklahoma State ===
	1	2	3	4	Total
No. 24 Wildcats	0	3	0	10	13
Cowboys	10	6	7	3	26

Oklahoma State's Chuba Hubbard ran for 296 yards, averaging 11.8 per attempt in a leading effort to hand Kansas State their first loss of the season. Coming into the game, Kansas State was #7 in team rushing and averaged 280 yards Oklahoma State's defense contributed well to the win as they held Kansas State to just 126 rushing yards, with only 18 of those yards in the first half.

Kansas State worked on a fourth-quarter comeback, but Oklahoma State was able to control the clock and win the game 26–13.

=== Baylor ===
	1	2	3	4	Total
Bears	0	10	7	14	31
Wildcats	3	0	3	6	12

Announced a week before the game on the Team's Twitter page, Kansas State would wear white helmets and white pants for the Fort Riley Day game against Baylor. This would be the first time since 2008 that the team would wear any color pants besides grey, when they wore purple pants.

Baylor's defense proved formidable and produced two turnovers, while their offense completed a balanced run game. Baylor remained undefeated with the 31–12 win over Kansas State.

=== TCU ===
	1	2	3	4	Total
Horned Frogs	0	10	7	0	17
Wildcats	7	7	3	7	24

Both Texas Christian and Kansas State entered the game having a week off from the regular season schedule. TCU featured quarterback Alex Delton, a former player for Kansas State who transferred to TCU during the off-season. But when the game time came around, Delton only completed two passes for a total of six yards and the bulk of the passing was completed by freshman Max Duggan, who put up 29 passes with 16 completions for a total of 132 yards passing.

Kansas State gained an early 7–0 lead and never trailed the rest of the way. TCU head coach Gary Patterson said, “I think you have an 80 percent chance of getting beat if you have a punt blocked.” Kansas State did block a punt in this game, as did Iowa State in the previous game for TCU that they also lost. The final score of the game was Kansas State 24, Texas Christian 17.

=== Oklahoma ===
	1	2	3	4	Total
No. 5 Sooners	17	6	0	18	41
Wildcats	7	17	17	7	48

Oklahoma traveled to Manhattan expecting a relatively easy road win but instead were pushed to what experts expected to be a critical loss for the Sooners in their hunt for the national title. The loss ended what was at the time the nation's longest road win streak.

Oklahoma's cornerback Parnell Motley was ejected from the game for unsportsmanlike conduct after kicking a Kansas State player. Kansas State's Eric Gallon forced a key fumble on a kick return but in process suffered a severe knee injury and he missed the rest of the game.

Oklahoma worked toward a fourth-quarter comeback, calling and recovering an onside kick with 1:43 left in the fourth quarter while down by seven points. After the initial call of a recovery by Oklahoma's Trejan Bridges, officials ruled that a player for Oklahoma had touched the ball before the kick went 10 yards and awarded possession to Kansas State. Officials for the conference later reviewed the call and supported the decision. Kansas State then ran out the clock for the win.

K-State's Skylar Thompson threw for 213 yards and ran for four touchdowns. Oklahoma fell four spots to #9 and Kansas State rose seven spots to #26 in the USA TODAY Sports Re-Rank 1–130.

=== At Kansas ===
	1	2	3	4	Total
No. 22 Wildcats	7	10	7	14	38
Jayhawks	3	0	0	7	10

Both Kansas and Kansas State came in to the 2019 Sunflower Showdown coming off of wins.

Kansas State scored a touchdown on its first possession and held the lead for the remainder of the game. Kansas State's offensive line was praised for their control of the line of scrimmage to help the Wildcats rush for 342 yards and five touchdowns. On Defense, Kansas State held their rival Jayhawks to just 10 points. Defensively, Kansas State also completed two interceptions and sacked Kansas quarterback Carter Stanley four times. Stanley's passing production was 13-for-23 with 123 yards, significantly less than the over 400 yards against Texas Tech and over 300 yards he accomplished against the Texas Longhorns in recent play.

The Kansas Jayhawks entered the game with high hopes and expectations--"convinced" that they would win largely based on performance in their previous two games. However, the Jayhawks only managed a field goal in the first quarter and did not score again until they managed a touchdown in the fourth quarter. That touchdown was the final score of the game: Kansas State 38; Kansas 10.

After the win and becoming bowl eligible, ESPN analysts Kyle Bonagura and Mark Schlabach both projected that Kansas State will play Notre Dame in the Camping World Bowl on December 28 in Orlando, Florida as a part of their Week 10 predictions Chris Low of ESPN commented that Kansas State is "going to be a tough out for anybody it faces the rest of the way" and that "the Wildcats are as fundamentally sound as it gets when it comes to running the ball and stopping the run." Low further stated that Kansas State has a great chance to win nine or more games for the season. Kansas State's projected bowl opponents Notre Dame (ranked #15 after this week) "did not exactly play an inspired game in a come-from-behind win over Virginia Tech" according to ESPN Analyst Andrea Adelson. However, Notre Dame is projected for a ten-win season.

=== At Texas ===
	1	2	3	4	Total
No. 16 Wildcats	14	0	0	10	24
Longhorns	0	7	10	10	27

In the days leading up to the Kansas State-Texas game, the College Football Playoff committee ranked Kansas State at #16 in the first playoff ranking of the season. This was measurably higher than the #20 in the AP Poll and #22 in the USA Today Poll. On that same day, Texas football quarterback Sam Ehlinger was named a semifinalist for the 2019 Wuerffel Trophy.

The game started with Kansas State taking a 14-point lead in the first quarter and allowed Texas to score a touchdown, making it 14–7 at halftime. Texas took the lead in the third quarter with ten more points to put it at 14–17. Each team added 10 more points in the fourth quarter to make the final score a Texas win 27–24, punctuated with a 26-yard game-winning field goal by the Longhorn's Cameron Dicker just as the clock ran out.

=== West Virginia ===
	1	2	3	4	Total
Mountaineers	14	0	0	10	24
No. 24 Wildcats	10	3	7	0	20

West Virginia's Jarret Doege started at quarterback and threw for 234 yards and three touchdowns. This was the first start at West Virginia for Doege who transferred from Bowling Green, as Austin Kendall had been the starting quarterback all season for the Mountaineers. Doege's biggest throw was a 50-yard touchdown pass on third-and-22 in the fourth quarter to take the lead.

Kansas State started strong, holding West Virginia to "three-and-out" and then Skylar Thompson threw a 68-yard touchdown pass on their first play from scrimmage. Thompson ended up 24 of 39 for 299 yards passing with a touchdown but also gave up two interceptions. On the ground, the Wildcats ran the ball 32 times but averaged only 3.2 yards per attempt.

West Virginia cornerback Hakeem Bailey intercepted Skylar Thompson's pass toward the end zone in the closing seconds of the game. The Mountaineers left Manhattan with a 24–20 upset of the Wildcats.

=== At Texas Tech ===
	1	2	3	4	Total
Wildcats	3	3	17	7	30
Red Raiders	0	3	14	10	27

Kansas State traveled to Lubbock to play Texas Tech for the 2019 meeting of the two schools. Texas Tech held Kansas State to just six points in the first half, but were unable to continue the success in the second half. Kansas State managed to force several interceptions—something no other team has done for the season.

In the third quarter, Kansas State's Joshua Youngblood returned a kickoff 100 yards for a touchdown. After the game, Youngblood credited key blocks from his teammates for the success of the play.

Texas Tech attempted two fake punts and were successful in one of those, but it did not result in a scoring drive. The successful fake occurred in the fourth quarter with Kansas State ahead by 10. Tech was on its own 42 yard line on fourth down with six to gain. The Tech punter Austin McNamara completed a pass to Ezukanma for 34 yards, taking it all the way to Kansas State's 10 yard line. The very next play, Texas Tech was intercepted in the end zone by Kansas State's Denzel Goolsby to stop the drive.

With one regular season game left to play, Kansas State's Chris Klieman tied the school record for the most wins by a first-year Kansas State head football coach. The Red Raiders were eliminated from bowl contention with the loss. The final score was close: Texas Tech 27, Kansas State 30.

=== Iowa State ===
	1	2	3	4	Total
No. 23 Cyclones	0	14	3	0	17
Wildcats	7	7	3	10	27

Game conditions were cold and windy for the 2019 edition of "Farmageddon". Iowa State entered the game as the least-penalized team in the Big 12 Conference, but were charged with 8 penalties to Kansas State's 2 when the two programs met in Manhattan. The Cyclones also struggled on third down, only converting 1 attempt of 13.

Kansas State's Joshua Youngblood returned a kick for a touchdown on the first play of the game. That placed him at the top of the NCAA for three touchdown returns in the season this year.

During the third quarter, each team managed a field goal but not much more happened offensively. In the fourth quarter, Kansas State was able to pull ahead 24-17 after an eight-play rushing drive ended in a touchdown with 10:24 left in the game. After that, Iowa State punter Joe Rivera kicked just 17 yards on fourth down, which Kansas State was able to turn into a field goal and put the score out of reach of the Cyclones. The final score was Kansas State 27, Iowa State 17.

=== Navy ===
	1	2	3	4	Total
No. 24 Midshipmen	3	7	7	3	20
Wildcats	0	10	0	7	17

Kansas State and Navy both accepted invitations to the Liberty Bowl, which became the first meeting for the two teams. Kansas State improved its regular season record from 5-7 last year to 8-4 and the Navy Midshipmen improved from 3-10 last season to 9-2 this year with one more regular season game to play--Army–Navy Game. Navy's only losses are to No. 14 Notre Dame and No. 15 Memphis. Navy averages 360.82 yards rushing per game – 49 more than any other Football Bowl Subdivision team.

After the bowl selection announcement, Navy defeated Army in the 2019 Army–Navy Game by a score of 31–7. This advanced Navy's record for the season to 10 wins and 2 losses.

Kansas State allowed Navy to accumulate 421 yards of offense and only produced 170 yards, a season-low for the Wildcats. Phillip Brooks managed a 64-yard put return for a touchdown. With less than 30 seconds remaining and the score tied, Navy ran a halfback pass play that resulted in Midshipmen's Chance Warren to run for a 41-yard gain to set up a field goal a few seconds later and win for Navy. The final score was Navy 20, Kansas State 17.

== Rankings ==
Ranking movements Legend: ██ Increase in ranking ██ Decrease in ranking — = Not ranked RV = Received votes
	Week																
Poll	Pre	1	2	3	4	5	6	7	8	9	10	11	12	13	14	15	Final
AP	—	—	—	RV	24	RV	—	—	—	22	20	RV	—	—	RV	RV	RV
Coaches	—	—	—	25	22	RV	—	—	—	25	22	RV	RV	—	RV	RV	RV
CFP	Not released										16	24	—	—	—	—	Not released

== Coaching staff ==
Name	Position	Year at Kansas State	Previous job
Chris Klieman	Head coach	1st	North Dakota State (HC)
Scottie Hazelton	DC/LB	1st	Wyoming (DC/LB)
Courtney Messingham	OC/TE	1st	North Dakota State (OC/RB)
Van Malone	AHC/PGC/CB	1st	Mississippi State (DA)
Brian Anderson	RB	1st	Illinois State (WR)
Collin Klein	QB	5th	Northern Iowa (QB)
Jason Ray	WR	1st	North Dakota State (WR)
Conor Riley	OL	1st	North Dakota State (OL)
Joe Klanderman	S	1st	North Dakota State (DB)
Mike Tuiasosopo	DT	1st	UTEP (DL)
Buddy Wyatt	DE	1st	Kansas (senior analyst)
