= Ivin Jasper =

American football player and coach (born 1970)

Current position
- Title: Quarterbacks coach, fullbacks coach
- Team: Navy
- Conference: American

Biographical details
- Born: May 14, 1970 (age 56)
- Education: University of Hawaii at Manoa B.S. 1994

Playing career
- 1991–1994: Hawaii
- Positions: Quarterback, slotback

Coaching career (HC unless noted)
- 1995–1996: Navy (QB/RB)
- 1997: Naval Academy Prep (RI) (OC)
- 1998: Indiana State (OC)
- 1999–2001: Georgia Southern (QB/FB)
- 2002–2007: Navy (QB)
- 2008–2021: Navy (OC/QB)
- 2022–2023: Navy (QB)
- 2024–present: Navy (QB/FB)

Ivin Jasper (born May 14, 1970) is an American football coach and former player. He is quarterbacks coach at the United States Naval Academy and has also spent time as the offensive coordinator for the school. He had been on the Navy football staff for the majority of his career. Jasper has also had coaching stops at the Naval Academy Preparatory School, Indiana State University, and Georgia Southern University.

== Playing career ==
Jasper was a three-year letterman for the Hawaii Rainbow Warriors (1991–1993) at quarterback and slotback and helped lead Hawaii to a Western Athletic Conference title.

== Coaching career ==
Following Jasper's playing career at Hawaii, he coached the quarterbacks, fullbacks, and slotbacks at Navy for the 1995 and 1996 seasons.

In 1997, Jasper served as the offensive coordinator at the Naval Academy Prep School.

From there, He moved on to Indiana State as the offensive coordinator for the 1998 season.

Jasper spent three seasons, 1999 through 2001, as the quarterbacks and fullbacks coach. Here, he worked for Paul Johnson and helped the Eagles win two NCAA I-AA National Championships.

In 2002, Jasper returned to Navy as the quarterbacks coach. He became offensive coordinator prior to the 2008 football season. He was fired on September 11, 2021, after the second game of the season. 2 days later, he was reinstated as the quarterbacks coach.

== Personal life ==
Jasper, a Los Angeles, California native, is a 1994 graduate of the University of Hawaii at Manoa where he earned his bachelor's degree in sociology/criminology. He and his wife, Donna, have three children. Their daughter, Dallas, played volleyball at Saint Leo University in St. Leo, Florida. Their oldest son, Jaylen, played volleyball at Pepperdine University. Their youngest son, Jarren, attended Arizona State University. Jarren had a heart transplant in January 2018.
