= Skylar Thompson =

American football player (born 1997)

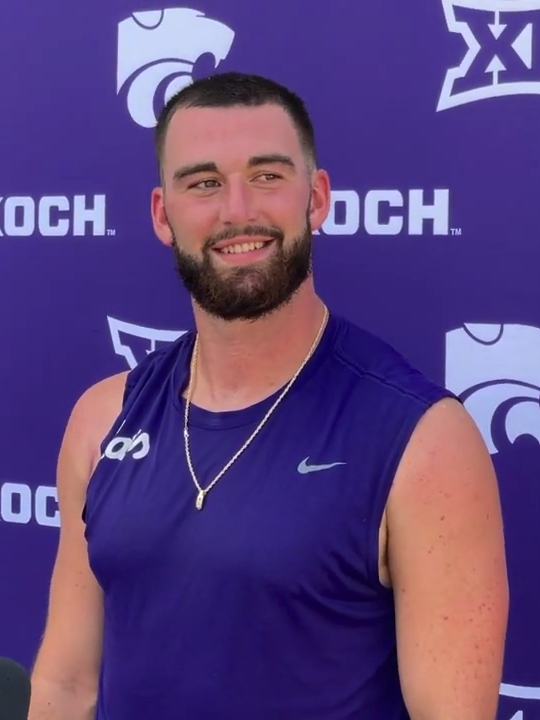
- Thompson with the Kansas State Wildcats in 2021

Baltimore Ravens
- Position: Quarterback
- Roster status: Injured reserve

Personal information
- Born: June 4, 1997 (age 29); Palmyra, Missouri, U.S.
- Listed height: 6 ft 2 in (1.88 m)
- Listed weight: 219 lb (99 kg)

Career information
- High school: Fort Osage (Independence, Missouri)
- College: Kansas State (2016–2021)
- NFL draft: 2022: 7th round, 247th overall pick

Career history
- Miami Dolphins (2022–2024); Pittsburgh Steelers (2025); Baltimore Ravens (2026–present)

Career NFL statistics as of 2025
- Passing attempts: 138
- Passing completions: 81
- Completion percentage: 58.7%
- TD–INT: 1–3
- Passing yards: 721
- Passer rating: 66.1
- Stats at Pro Football Reference

Skylar John Thompson (born June 4, 1997) is an American professional football quarterback for the Baltimore Ravens of the National Football League (NFL). He played college football for the Kansas State Wildcats and was drafted by the Miami Dolphins in the seventh round of the 2022 NFL draft.

== Early life ==
Thompson was born to Brad Thompson and Teresa Thompson in Sullivan, Missouri on June 4, 1997. His mother Teresa was diagnosed with stage-four breast cancer and died in 2004 when Thompson was just six years old. Thompson also lost his grandfather, John Thompson, in 2003 to pancreatic cancer.

Thompson was a four-year letterman and starting quarterback, punter, and kicker at Fort Osage High School in Independence, Missouri. As a senior, Thompson threw for 2,129 yards on 142 passes with 26 touchdowns on only 3 interceptions, leading the Fort Osage Indians to a 13–1 record and a state championship title over Chaminade High School. In the state championship game, Thompson threw and rushed for a state championship game record of 455 yards and 7 touchdowns combined. In his total career, Thompson threw for 6,222 yards on 423 passes (a 63% completion rate) with 72 touchdowns on just 9 interceptions.

Thompson was named a 3-star recruit by ESPN and a 4-star recruit by 247Sports, accepting a full-ride scholarship to Kansas State over offers from Illinois, Iowa State, Kansas, Louisville, North Dakota State, Ohio, Tulsa, UNLV, Wake Forest, and Wyoming, as well as several preferred walk-on spots, including Arkansas, Oklahoma, and Missouri, among many others.

Thompson also lettered in basketball, baseball, and soccer, and was named Missouri All-State in both basketball and soccer at certain points in his career.

== College career ==
After redshirting as a freshman and being named Scout Team Player of the Year, Thompson appeared in eight games and had four starts, throwing three touchdowns on 267 yards. He was named the full-time starter as a sophomore and kept that starting role until graduation, but was constantly plagued with injuries throughout college. His sophomore year was riddled with minor injuries, including a broken rib and a twisted ankle, and in 2020, Thompson was ruled out-for-season after sustaining a serious upper-body injury against Texas Tech. He was again injured in week 3 of 2021 against Southern Illinois, seeing limited time as a backup while healing and not returning full-time until week 10.

When Thompson was healthy, he played very well and was considered one of the best quarterbacks in the history of Kansas State football, having the all-time record for best passer rating over 2,000 yards, the second-most career passing touchdowns and passing yards in school history, as well as the second-most total offensive yards for a quarterback in school history. He finished his passing career with 7,134 yards on 552 passes (a 63% completion rate) for 42 touchdowns and 16 interceptions. Skylar was also an effective running quarterback with 1,087 total rushing yards and 26 touchdowns.

== Professional career ==
Pre-draft measurables
Height	Weight	Arm length	Hand span	Wingspan	40-yard dash	10-yard split	20-yard split	20-yard shuttle	Three-cone drill	Vertical jump	Broad jump
6 ft 1 7/8 in (1.88 m)	217 lb (98 kg)	31 in (0.79 m)	8 5/8 in (0.22 m)	6 ft 2 5/8 in (1.90 m)	4.91 s	1.62 s	2.77 s	4.28 s	7.00 s	31.0 in (0.79 m)	9 ft 4 in (2.84 m)
All values from NFL Combine

=== Miami Dolphins ===
Prior to the NFL draft, Thompson was predicted to be an undrafted free agent due to a history of injuries, his age, and a "lack of consistent production as a passer," according to NFL.com. He was selected by the Miami Dolphins, with the 247th overall pick in the seventh round of the 2022 NFL draft.

==== 2022 ====
Thompson's performance during the first two games of the 2022 preseason was notable, with ProFootballTalk speculating that his success might force the Dolphins to keep Thompson on the active roster rather than risk losing him to another team. Dolphins head coach Mike McDaniel also noted that it would be difficult to leave Thompson off of the main roster in light of his strong preseason performances. Thompson ranked first among qualifying quarterbacks in passer rating (138.5) at the conclusion of the 2022 preseason. Thompson was named to the 53 man roster after final cuts. Thompson Fell short against buffalo in the wild card.

Thompson made his NFL debut in Week 5 against the New York Jets after Teddy Bridgewater left the game with a concussion. He completed 19-of-33 passes for 166 yards and an interception in the 40–17 loss.

On October 15, 2022, Thompson was announced as the Dolphins Week 6 starter against the Minnesota Vikings after both Tua Tagovailoa and Teddy Bridgewater were dealing with concussions. He sustained a thumb injury after completing 7-of-13 passes for 89 yards and was replaced by Bridgewater, who cleared concussion protocol and was active as the backup quarterback.

On January 6, 2023, Thompson was announced as the starter against the Jets in Week 18 after Tagovailoa entered concussion protocol following Week 16 and Bridgewater suffered a dislocated finger on his throwing hand in Week 17. He completed 20 passes on 31 attempts for 152 yards in an 11–6 win for the Dolphins, clinching the team's first postseason appearance since the 2016 season.

On January 11, Tagovailoa was officially ruled out for the Dolphins' Wild Card Round game against the Buffalo Bills, with McDaniel stating that Thompson would start his third career game. Miami entered the contest as 14-point underdogs and were defeated 34–31. Thompson threw for 220 yards, a touchdown, and two interceptions with a 40% completion rate, though Miami's receivers were credited with several drops.

==== 2023 ====
With Tagovailoa healthy, Thompson served as the third-string quarterback behind Mike White and did not appear during the 2023 season.

==== 2024 ====
Thompson replaced Tagovailoa in their Week 2 game against the Buffalo Bills after the latter left the game with a concussion. Thompson later started in Week 3 against the Seattle Seahawks but left midway through the third quarter in their 24–3 loss with a rib injury. He was waived on December 14, 2024 and re-signed to the practice squad three days later.

=== Pittsburgh Steelers ===
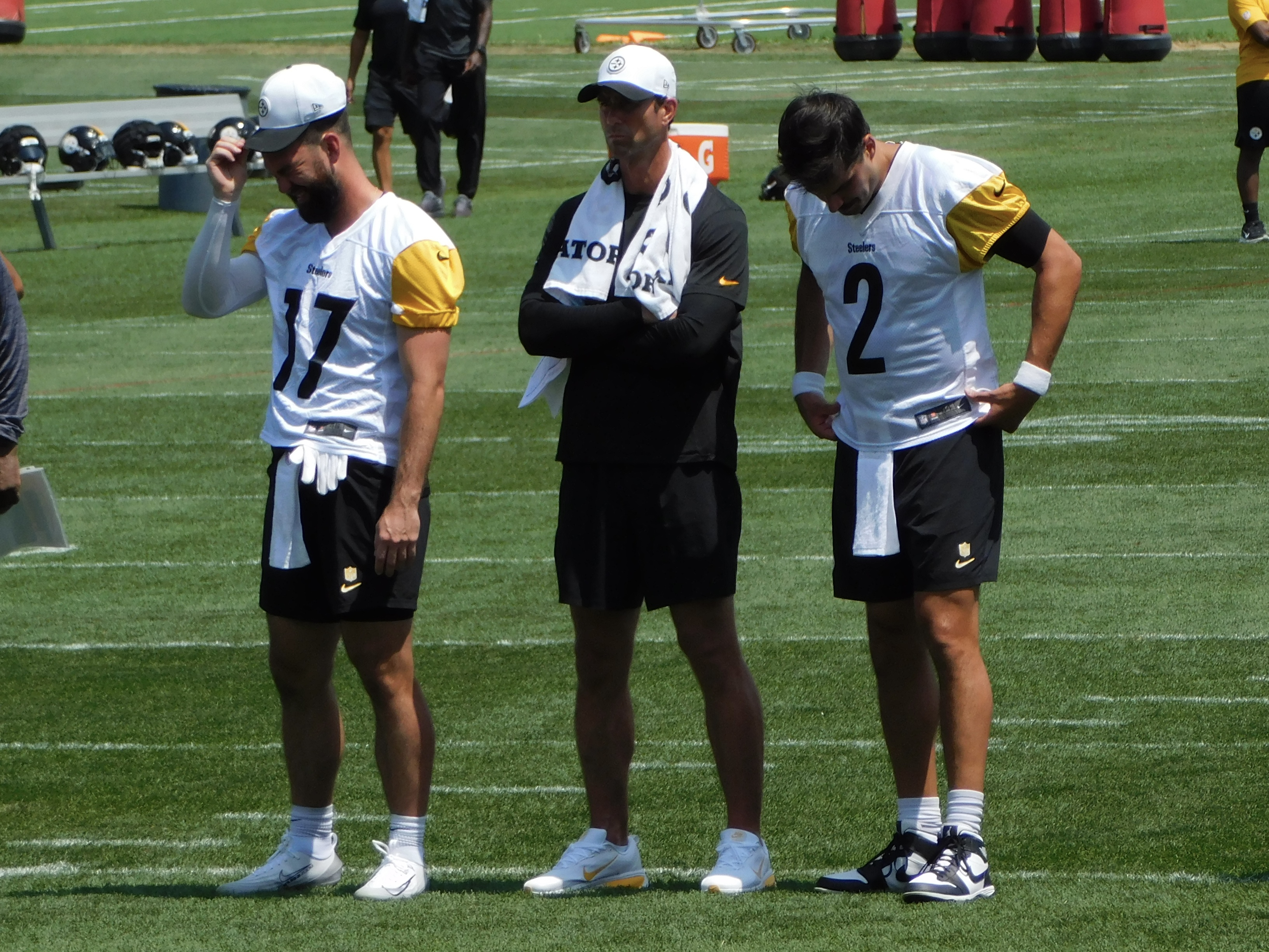
Thompson (17) with quarterbacks coach Tom Arth and Mason Rudolph in 2025

On January 14, 2025, the Pittsburgh Steelers signed Thompson to a reserve/future contract. On September 12, Thompson was placed on injured reserve due to a hamstring injury suffered in practice.

=== Baltimore Ravens ===
On May 4, 2026, Thompson signed a one-year contract with the Baltimore Ravens. He was placed on injured reserve due to an undisclosed injury on August 12.

== Career statistics ==
=== NFL ===
==== Regular season ====
Year	Team	Games			Passing									Rushing					Sacks		Fumbles	
Year	Team	GP	GS	Record	Cmp	Att	Pct	Yds	Y/A	Lng	TD	Int	Rtg	Att	Yds	Avg	Lng	TD	Sck	SckY	Fum	Lost
2022	MIA	7	2	1–1	60	105	57.1	534	5.1	32	1	3	62.2	14	21	1.5	9	0	6	40	2	2
2023	MIA	0	0	—	DNP																	
2024	MIA	3	1	0–1	21	33	63.6	187	5.7	22	0	0	78.7	1	4	4.0	4	0	6	44	2	0
2025	PIT	0	0	—	DNP																	
2026	BAL	0	0	Did not play due to injury																		
Career		10	3	1–2	81	138	58.7	721	5.2	32	1	3	66.1	15	25	1.7	9	0	12	84	4	2

==== Postseason ====
Year	Team	Games			Passing									Rushing					Sacks		Fumbles	
Year	Team	GP	GS	Record	Cmp	Att	Pct	Yds	Y/A	Lng	TD	Int	Rtg	Att	Yds	Avg	Lng	TD	Sck	SckY	Fum	Lost
2022	MIA	1	1	0–1	18	45	40.0	220	4.9	25	1	2	44.7	2	3	1.5	2	0	4	31	0	0
2023	MIA	0	0	—	DNP																	
Career		1	1	0–1	18	45	40.0	220	4.9	25	1	2	44.7	2	3	1.5	2	0	4	31	0	0

=== College ===
Season	Team	GP	Passing								Rushing			
Season	Team	GP	Cmp	Att	Pct	Yds	Avg	TD	Int	Rtg	Att	Yds	Avg	TD
2016	Kansas State	0	Redshirt											
2017	Kansas State	8	51	83	61.4	689	8.3	5	3	143.8	69	267	3.9	3
2018	Kansas State	11	122	208	58.7	1,391	6.7	9	4	125.3	105	373	3.6	5
2019	Kansas State	13	177	297	59.6	2,315	7.8	12	5	135.0	114	405	3.6	11
2020	Kansas State	3	40	64	62.5	626	9.8	4	0	165.3	19	38	2.0	3
2021	Kansas State	10	162	233	69.5	2,103	9.0	12	4	158.9	48	4	0.1	4
Career		45	552	885	62.4	7,134	8.0	42	16	142.0	355	1,087	3.1	26

== Personal life ==
In April 2025, Thompson married his wife, Bre Newcomer.

During Week 4 of the 2025 NFL season, the Steelers travelled to Dublin, Ireland to play the Minnesota Vikings. On September 26, 2025, Thompson suffered minor injuries after being jumped and robbed in Dublin.
