= 2021 Birmingham Bowl =

Postseason college football bowl game

2021 TicketSmarter Birmingham Bowl
- 15th Birmingham Bowl
Houston Cougars	Auburn Tigers
(11–2)	(6–6)
The American	SEC
17	13
Head coach: Dana Holgorsen	Head coach: Bryan Harsin
AP / Coaches / CFP; 21 / 21 / 20
	1	2	3	4	Total
Houston	7	3	0	7	17
Auburn	0	3	10	0	13
- Date: December 28, 2021
- Season: 2021
- Stadium: Protective Stadium
- Location: Birmingham, Alabama
- MVP: Clayton Tune (QB, Houston)
- Favorite: Auburn by 2
- Referee: Michael Mothershed (Pac-12)
- Attendance: 47,100

United States TV coverage
- Network: ESPN
- Announcers: Taylor Zarzour (play-by-play), Eric Mac Lain (analyst), and Taylor Davis (sideline)

The 2021 Birmingham Bowl was a college football bowl game played on December 28, 2021, with kickoff at 12:00 p.m. EST (11:00 a.m. local CST) and televised on ESPN. It was the 15th edition of the Birmingham Bowl (after the 2020 edition was cancelled due to the COVID-19 pandemic), and was one of the 2021–22 bowl games concluding the 2021 FBS football season. Sponsored by the TicketSmarter ticket sales company, the game was officially known as the TicketSmarter Birmingham Bowl. This was the first edition of the bowl played at Protective Stadium.

== Teams ==
Consistent with conference tie-ins, the bowl features teams from the American Athletic Conference (AAC or "The American") and the Southeastern Conference (SEC).

This was the seventh meeting between Auburn and Houston; previous to the game, the Tigers led the all-time series, 5–1.

== Game summary ==
2021 TicketSmarter Birmingham Bowl

Quarter	1	2	3	4	Total
No. 20 Houston	7	3	0	7	17
Auburn	0	3	10	0	13

at Protective Stadium • Birmingham, Alabama

- Date: Tuesday, December 28, 2021
- Game time: 11:00 a.m. CST
- Game attendance: 47,100
- TV announcers (ESPN): Taylor Zarzour (play-by-play), Eric Mac Lain (analyst), and Taylor Davis (sideline)
- Box score

Scoring summary

Quarter	Time	Drive			Team	Scoring information	Score	
Quarter	Time	Plays	Yards	TOP	Team	Scoring information	Houston	Auburn
1	8:46	12	87	6:14	Houston	Alton McCaskill 5-yard touchdown reception from Clayton Tune, Dalton Witherspoon kick good	7	0
2	6:58	9	44	4:10	Houston	52-yard field goal by Dalton Witherspoon	10	0
2	3:10	8	67	3:48	Auburn	27-yard field goal by Ben Patton	10	3
3	12:12	7	57	2:48	Auburn	35-yard field goal by Ben Patton	10	6
3	3:52	11	78	6:20	Auburn	Kobe Hudson 12-yard touchdown reception from T. J. Finley, Ben Patton kick good	10	13
4	3:27	8	80	3:20	Houston	Jake Herslow 26-yard touchdown reception from Clayton Tune, Dalton Witherspoon kick good	17	13
"TOP" = time of possession. For other American football terms, see Glossary of American football.								

== Statistics ==
=== Team statistics ===
Team statistical comparison
Statistic	Houston	Auburn
First downs	19	15
First downs rushing	6	6
First downs passing	12	8
First downs penalty	1	1
Third down efficiency	6–14	4–15
Fourth down efficiency	1–2	1–3
Total plays–net yards	67–398	66–352
Rushing attempts–net yards	26–115	29–125
Yards per rush	4.4	4.3
Yards passing	283	227
Pass completions–attempts	26–41	19–37
Interceptions thrown	2	0
Punt returns–total yards	0–0	0–0
Kickoff returns–total yards	4–52	2–42
Punts–average yardage	4–35.8	6–38.3
Fumbles–lost	2–0	2–0
Penalties–yards	6–34	3–35
Time of possession	29:50	30:10

=== Individual statistics ===
Houston statistics
Cougars passing
	C–A	Yds	TD–INT
Clayton Tune	26–40	283	2–1
Seth Green	0–1	0	0–1
Cougars rushing
	Car	Yds	TD
Alton McCaskill	14	78	0
Clayton Tune	7	43	0
Ta'Zhawn Henry	2	−2	0
TEAM	3	−6	0
Cougars receiving
	Rec	Yds	TD
Nathaniel Dell	10	150	0
Jake Herslow	5	65	1
Christian Trahan	3	30	0
Jeremy Singleton	2	17	0
Alton McCaskill	4	15	1
Ta'Zhawn Henry	2	6	0

Auburn statistics
Tigers passing
	C–A	Yds	TD–INT
T. J. Finley	19–37	227	1–0
Tigers rushing
	Car	Yds	TD
Tank Bigsby	16	96	0
Malcolm Johnson Jr.	2	24	0
Jarquez Hunter	5	17	0
Ja'Varrius Johnson	1	2	0
John Samuel Shenker	1	1	0
TEAM	1	−3	0
Demetris Robertson	1	−5	0
T. J. Finley	2	−7	0
Tigers receiving
	Rec	Yds	TD
Tank Bigsby	5	68	0
Kobe Hudson	4	57	1
John Samuel Shenker	5	54	0
Ja'Varrius Johnson	1	20	0
Demetris Robertson	2	15	0
Shedrick Jackson	2	13	0

== Externals links ==
- Game statistics at statbroadcast.com
