= 2021 American Athletic Conference Football Championship Game =

- 7th AAC Championship Game
Houston Cougars	Cincinnati Bearcats
(11–1)	(12–0)
20	35
Head coach: Dana Holgorsen	Head coach: Luke Fickell
AP / Coaches / CFP; 16 / 16 / 21	AP / Coaches / CFP; 3 / 4 / 4
	1	2	3	4	Total
Houston	10	3	0	7	20
Cincinnati	14	0	21	0	35
- Date: December 4, 2021
- Season: 2021
- Stadium: Nippert Stadium
- Location: Cincinnati, Ohio
- MVP: Jerome Ford, RB, Cincinnati
- Favorite: Cincinnati by 10.5
- Referee: Hank Johns
- Attendance: 37,978

United States TV coverage
- Network: ABC
- Announcers: Joe Tessitore (play-by-play), Greg McElroy (analyst), and Katie George (sideline)

2021 American Athletic Conference football standings
	Conf.			Overall
Team	W		L	W		L
No. 4 Cincinnati y$^	8	–	0	13	–	1
No. 17 Houston y	8	–	0	12	–	2
UCF	5	–	3	9	–	4
East Carolina	5	–	3	7	–	5
Tulsa	5	–	3	7	–	6
SMU	4	–	4	8	–	4
Memphis	3	–	5	6	–	6
Navy	3	–	5	4	–	8
Tulane	1	–	7	2	–	10
South Florida	1	–	7	2	–	10
Temple	1	–	7	3	–	9
Championship: Cincinnati 35, Houston 20
^ – College Football Playoff participant; $ – Conference champion; y – Championship game participant; Rankings from AP Poll

The 2021 American Athletic Conference Football Championship Game was a college football game played on December 4, 2021, at Nippert Stadium in Cincinnati, Ohio. It was the seventh American Athletic Conference Football Championship Game and determined the champion of the American Athletic Conference (AAC) for the 2021 season. The game began at 4:00 p.m. EST and aired on ABC. The game featured the regular season champions, the Cincinnati Bearcats, and the regular season runners-up, the Houston Cougars. Sponsored by RoofClaim.com, a roofing services company, the game was officially known as the 2021 American Athletic Conference Football Championship Game presented by RoofClaim.com.

== Teams ==
This was the second year of the current division-less format of the game; instead of representatives from two divisions, the two teams with the best conference records earned a spot in the game.

=== Houston ===
Houston clinched a berth in the championship game following its win over Temple on November 13. This was the Cougars' second appearance in the American Championship Game, having won the inaugural contest 24–13 over Temple in 2015.

=== Cincinnati ===
Cincinnati clinched a berth in the championship game following its win over SMU on November 20. The Bearcats secured home-field advantage for the championship game on November 26, defeating East Carolina 35–13 to complete an undefeated regular season. This was the Bearcats' third straight championship game appearance, having lost to Memphis 29–24 in 2019 and defeating Tulsa 27–24 in 2020. Entering the game, the fourth-ranked Bearcats held the highest College Football Playoff ranking of any team to play in the American Championship Game.

== Game summary ==
Taking the opening kickoff, the Cougars marched right down the field mixing runs and passes to get into Cincinnati territory. The Bearcats defense stiffened and forced the Cougars to settle for a 37-yard field goal by Dalton Witherspoon to take an early 3–0 lead. The Bearcats responded with a crisp 5-play, 82-yard drive with QB Desmond Ridder completing passes to four different receivers. Ridder found WR Tyler Scott on a 25-yard post pattern pass in the end zone to give the Bearcats a 7–3 lead. The Cougars responded with a solid touchdown drive of their own, going 74 yards in 10 plays, capped by a QB Clayton Tune pass to WR Tank Dell. That lead was short lived as on the Bearcat first play from scrimmage following the kickoff Jerome Ford took the handoff, slipped through the right side and dashed untouched 79 yards for a touchdown. It was Ford's 4th touchdown run of 75 yards or more of the season. The Bearcats were back in front 14–10 and the sellout crowd of 37,978 buckled in for what was shaping up to be a high scoring shootout. The Cougars strung together another time-consuming drive but once again the Bearcats defense stopped Houston inside the 30. Witherspoon connected on a 46-yard field goal to narrow the Cincinnati lead to 14–13. The Bearcats could not extend their lead after a fine kickoff return by Tre Tucker set the Bearcats up in Houston territory. The Bearcats got inside the 10 but the drive stalled and Christian Lowery missed a 23-yard field goal. The Bearcats took a 14–13 lead into halftime.

Taking the second half kickoff, the Bearcats went 75 yards on 6 plays, highlighted by a 44-yard pass from Ridder to WR Alec Pierce who made a spectacular diving catch on a seemingly overthrown ball. The Bearcats took advantage of a 4th down pass interference call on Houston and scored on an 8-yard swing pass from Ridder to TE Leonard Taylor. With the score now 21–13, the Cougars next drive ended after one play as LB Joel Dublanko intercepted a Tune pass and returned it to the Houston 23 yard line. Two plays later, Pierce out jumped Houston CB Marcus Jones in the end zone and the Bearcats now held a 28–13 lead less than 5 minutes into the 2nd half. The Cougars went three-and-out on their next series and punted. Three plays later, Ford broke over the left side finding a wide-open seam and sprinted 42 yards for a touchdown, the third of the 3rd quarter in less than 8 minutes of game time. The 3rd quarter continued to be a struggle for the Cougars as the Bearcats defense continued to stifle them at every turn. The Cougars were held to −6 yards offense in the 3rd quarter, gaining one first down, and no points. The Cougars did manage to score a touchdown midway through the 4th quarter to close the gap to 35–20, but that would be as close as they would get. At game's end, much of the sellout crowd stormed the field in celebration as the Bearcats clinched their second straight American Athletic Football Championship with the win. Jerome Ford was named the Most Outstanding Player with 187 rushing yards and two touchdowns. Desmond Ridder only completed 11 passes on 17 attempts for 190 yards. His passes were judicious and sparingly needed as the Bearcat running game rang up 210 yards. The Bearcat defense registered 8 sacks, with Joel Dublanko notching a pair to go along with 7 tackles and the games lone turnover on the 3rd quarter interception. The Bearcats won despite only having the ball 19 minutes on offense. The Bearcats ended the evening as the nation's only unbeaten team in the 2021 season and with the final results of the College Football Playoff poll the next day would be chosen as one of the four teams that would play for the national championship.

2021 American Athletic Conference Football Championship Game

Quarter	1	2	3	4	Total
No. 21 Houston	10	3	0	7	20
No. 4 Cincinnati	14	0	21	0	35

at Nippert Stadium • Cincinnati, OH

- Date: December 4, 2021
- Game time: 4:08 p.m. EST
- Game weather: 52 °F (11 °C) • Sunny • Wind: 6 mph (9.7 km/h) north
- Game attendance: 37,978
- Referee: Hank Johns
- TV announcers (ABC): Joe Tessitore (play-by-play), Greg McElroy (analyst), and Katie George (sideline)
- Box score

Scoring summary

Quarter	Time	Drive			Team	Scoring information	Score	
Quarter	Time	Plays	Yards	TOP	Team	Scoring information	Houston	Cincinnati
1	11:55	7	50	2:57	Houston	37-yard field goal by Dalton Witherspoon	3	0
1	9:38	5	82	2:11	Cincinnati	Tyler Scott 25-yard touchdown reception from Desmond Ridder, Christian Lowery kick good	3	7
1	4:23	10	74	5:07	Houston	Nathaniel Dell 16-yard touchdown reception from Clayton Tune, Dalton Witherspoon kick good	10	7
1	4:06	1	79	0:11	Cincinnati	Jerome Ford 79-yard touchdown run, Christian Lowery kick good	10	14
2	11:40	13	44	7:21	Houston	46-yard field goal by Dalton Witherspoon	13	14
3	12:02	6	75	2:58	Cincinnati	Leonard Taylor 8-yard touchdown reception from Desmond Ridder, Christian Lowery kick good	13	21
3	11:04	2	23	0:41	Cincinnati	Alec Pierce 21-yard touchdown reception from Desmond Ridder, Christian Lowery kick good	13	28
3	7:38	3	62	1:18	Cincinnati	Jerome Ford 42-yard touchdown run, Christian Lowery kick good	13	35
4	6:06	13	90	7:28	Houston	Jake Herslow 7-yard touchdown reception from Clayton Tune, Dalton Witherspoon kick good	20	35
"TOP" = time of possession. For other American football terms, see Glossary of American football.								

=== Statistics ===
Statistics	HOU	CIN
First downs	22	14
Plays–yards	73–336	45–400
Rushes–yards	47–86	28–210
Passing yards	250	190
Passing: comp–att–int	17–26–1	11–17–0
Turnovers		
Time of possession	40:19	19:41

Team	Category	Player	Statistics
Houston	Passing	Clayton Tune	17/26, 250 yards, 2 TD, 1 INT
Houston	Rushing	Alton McCaskill	13 carries, 39 yards
Houston	Receiving	Nathaniel Dell	9 receptions, 152 yards, 1 TD
Cincinnati	Passing	Desmond Ridder	11/17, 190 yards, 3 TD
Cincinnati	Rushing	Jerome Ford	18 carries, 187 yards, 2 TD
Cincinnati	Receiving	Alec Pierce	2 receptions, 65 yards, 1 TD
