= 2021 Temple Owls football team =

American college football season

2021 Temple Owls football
- Conference: American Athletic Conference
- Record: 3–9 (1–7 The American)
- Head coach: Rod Carey (3rd season)
- Offensive coordinator: Mike Uremovich (3rd season)
- Offensive scheme: Multiple
- Defensive coordinator: Jeff Knowles (3rd season)
- Base defense: 3–4
- Home stadium: Lincoln Financial Field

2021 American Athletic Conference football standings
	Conf.			Overall
Team	W		L	W		L
No. 4 Cincinnati y$^	8	–	0	13	–	1
No. 17 Houston y	8	–	0	12	–	2
UCF	5	–	3	9	–	4
East Carolina	5	–	3	7	–	5
Tulsa	5	–	3	7	–	6
SMU	4	–	4	8	–	4
Memphis	3	–	5	6	–	6
Navy	3	–	5	4	–	8
Tulane	1	–	7	2	–	10
South Florida	1	–	7	2	–	10
Temple	1	–	7	3	–	9
Championship: Cincinnati 35, Houston 20
^ – College Football Playoff participant; $ – Conference champion; y – Championship game participant; Rankings from AP Poll

The 2021 Temple Owls football team represented Temple University during the 2021 NCAA Division I FBS football season. The Owls were led by third-year head coach Rod Carey and played their home games at Lincoln Financial Field, competing as a member of the American Athletic Conference (AAC).

== Preseason ==
=== American Athletic Conference preseason media poll ===
The American Athletic Conference preseason media poll was released at the virtual media day held August 4, 2021. Cincinnati, who finished the 2020 season ranked No. 8 nationally, was tabbed as the preseason favorite in the 2021 preseason media poll.

Media poll
Predicted finish	Team	Votes (1st place)
1	Cincinnati	262 (22)
2	UCF	241 (2)
3	SMU	188
4	Houston	181
5	Memphis	168
6	Tulsa	153
7	Tulane	132
т-8	East Carolina	85
т-8	Navy	85
10	Temple	46
11	South Florida	43

== Schedule ==
Date	Time	Opponent	Site	TV	Result	Attendance
September 4	12:00 p.m.	at Rutgers*	SHI Stadium; Piscataway, NJ	BTN	L 14–61	52,519
September 11	3:30 p.m.	at Akron*	InfoCision Stadium; Akron, OH	ESPN+	W 45–24	14,474
September 18	12:00 p.m.	Boston College*	Lincoln Financial Field; Philadelphia, PA	ESPNU	L 3–28	25,290
September 25	12:00 p.m.	Wagner*	Lincoln Financial Field; Philadelphia, PA	ESPN+	W 41–7	20,179
October 2	12:00 p.m.	Memphis^{†}	Lincoln Financial Field; Philadelphia, PA	ESPNU	W 34–31	28,573
October 8	7:00 p.m.	at No. 5 Cincinnati	Nippert Stadium; Cincinnati, OH	ESPN	L 3–52	37,978
October 23	7:00 p.m.	at South Florida	Raymond James Stadium; Tampa, FL	ESPN+	L 14–34	25,430
October 30	12:00 p.m.	UCF	Lincoln Financial Field; Philadelphia, PA	ESPN+	L 7–49	19,595
November 6	3:00 p.m.	at East Carolina	Dowdy–Ficklen Stadium; Greenville, NC	ESPN+	L 3–45	32,817
November 13	12:00 p.m.	Houston	Lincoln Financial Field; Philadelphia, PA	ESPN+	L 8–37	18,440
November 20	4:00 p.m.	at Tulsa	H.A. Chapman Stadium; Tulsa, OK	ESPN+	L 10–44	16,731
November 27	12:00 p.m.	Navy	Lincoln Financial Field; Philadelphia, PA	ESPNU	L 14–38	16,708
*Non-conference game; ^{†}Homecoming; Rankings from AP Poll and CFP Rankings after November 24 released prior to game; All times are in Eastern time

== Game summaries ==
=== At Rutgers ===
Temple at Rutgers

Team	1	2	3	4	Total
Owls	0	7	7	0	14
• Scarlet Knights	12	14	14	21	61

- Date: September 4, 2021
- Location: SHI Stadium
  Piscataway, NJ
- Game start: 12:02 p.m. EDT
- Elapsed time: 3 hours and 23 minutes
- Game attendance: 52,519
- Game weather: 76 °F (24 °C) • Weather: Sunny • Wind: NW 4 MPH
- Referee: Jeff Servinski
- TV announcers (Big Ten Network): Joe Beninati (play-by-play), Matt McGloin (analyst), and Michelle McMahon (sideline)

Scoring summary
1	11:54	RUT	Olakunle Fatukasi safety (3 plays, -1 yards, 1:08)	RUT 2–0
1	08:52	RUT	Valentino Ambrosio 25-yard field goal (8 plays, 26 yards, 2:51)	RUT 5–0
1	01:44	RUT	Johnny Langan 2-yard rush (Valentino Ambrosio kick) (1 play, 2 yards, 0:03)	RUT 12–0
2	14:15	RUT	Johnny Langan 1-yard rush (Valentino Ambrosio kick) (6 plays, 28 yards, 2:23)	RUT 19–0
2	10:59	RUT	Kyle Monangai 1-yard rush (Valentino Ambrosio kick) (4 plays, 22 yards, 1:24)	RUT 26–0
2	09:15	TEM	Edward Saydee 11-yard rush (Samir Gardner kick) (7 plays, 65 yards, 1:44)	RUT 26–7
3	12:02	TEM	D'Wan Mathis 3-yard rush (Samir Gardner kick) (9 plays, 81 yards, 2:52)	RUT 26–14
3	08:05	RUT	Bo Melton 40-yard pass from Noah Vedral (Valentino Ambrosio kick) (2 plays, 55 yards, 0:33)	RUT 33–14
3	06:57	RUT	Max Melton 46-yard interception returned (Valentino Ambrosio kick) (3 plays, 14 yards, 1:08)	RUT 40–14
4	14:57	RUT	Isiah Pacheco 2-yard rush (Valentino Ambrosio kick) (12 plays, 64 yards, 5:29)	RUT 47–14
4	11:26	RUT	Aaron Young 1-yard rush (Valentino Ambrosio kick) (4 plays, 17 yards, 1:29)	RUT 54–14
4	03:09	RUT	Kyle Monangai 7-yard rush (Valentino Ambrosio kick) (13 plays, 62 yards, 6:37)	RUT 61–14

Statistics	Temple	Rutgers
First downs	12	21
Total yards	261	365
Rushing yards	113	220
Passing yards	148	145
Turnovers	5	0
Time of possession	24:23	35:37

Team	Category	Player	Statistics
Temple	Passing	D'Wan Mathis	8/24, 148 yards, 1 INT
Temple	Rushing	Edward Saydee	12 carries, 57 yards, 1 TD
Temple	Receiving	Jose Barbon	2 receptions, 48 yards
Rutgers	Passing	Noah Vedral	15/27, 138 yards, 1 TD
Rutgers	Rushing	Noah Vedral	9 carries, 71 yards
Rutgers	Receiving	Bo Melton	6 receptions, 59 yards, 1 TD

=== At Akron ===
Temple at Akron

Team	1	2	3	4	Total
• Owls	7	17	14	7	45
Zips	14	3	0	7	24

- Date: September 11, 2021
- Location: InfoCision Stadium–Summa Field
  Akron, OH
- Game start: 3:35 p.m. EDT
- Elapsed time: 2 hours and 25 minutes
- Game attendance: 14,573
- Game weather: 75 °F (24 °C) • Weather: Sunny • Wind: SSW 15 MPH
- Referee: Greg Sujak
- TV announcers (ESPN+): Michael Reghi (play-by-play) and Je'Rod Cherry (analyst)

Scoring summary
1	10:19	AKR	DJ Irons 9-yard rush (Cory Smigel kick) (12 plays, 77 yards, 4:41)	AKR 7–0
1	02:43	AKR	Tony Grimes Jr. 17-yard pass from Kato Nelson (Cory Smigel kick) (10 plays, 80 yards, 4:26)	AKR 14–0
1	02:26	TEM	Randle Jones 70-yard pass from Justin Lynch (Rory Bell kick) (1 play, 70 yards, 0:12)	AKR 14–7
2	11:46	AKR	Cory Smigel 39-yard field goal (11 plays, 53 yards, 5:40)	AKR 17–7
2	05:24	TEM	William Kwenkeu 38-yard fumble returned (Rory Bell kick) (7 plays, 15 yards, 3:10)	AKR 17–14
2	05:12	TEM	Manny Walker 3-yard interception returned (Rory Bell kick) (1 play, -10 yards, 0:05)	TEM 21–17
2	00:37	TEM	Rory Bell 26-yard field goal (10 plays, 59 yards, 2:46)	TEM 24–17
3	09:34	TEM	Randle Jones 27-yard pass from Justin Lynch (Rory Bell kick) (5 plays, 71 yards, 2:13)	TEM 31–17
3	00:24	TEM	Justin Lynch 1-yard rush (Rory Bell kick) (11 plays, 77 yards, 5:51)	TEM 38–17
4	06:06	TEM	Ra'Von Bonner 1-yard rush (Rory Bell kick) (11 plays, 67 yards, 5:43)	TEM 45–17
4	02:47	AKR	Konata Mumpfield 3-yard pass from DJ Irons (Cory Smigel kick) (7 plays, 75 yards, 3:19)	TEM 45–24

Statistics	Temple	Akron
First downs	19	26
Total yards	432	362
Rushing yards	177	171
Passing yards	255	191
Turnovers	0	2
Time of possession	27:51	32:09

Team	Category	Player	Statistics
Temple	Passing	Justin Lynch	19/23, 255 yards, 2 TDs
Temple	Rushing	Tayvon Ruley	6 carries, 62 yards
Temple	Receiving	Randle Jones	7 receptions, 170 yards, 2 TDs
Akron	Passing	DJ Irons	12/22, 109 yards, 1 TD, 1 INT
Akron	Rushing	Jonzell Norrils	15 carries, 66 yards
Akron	Receiving	Michael Mathison	8 receptions, 101 yards

=== Boston College ===
Boston College at Temple

Team	1	2	3	4	Total
• RV Eagles	14	7	0	7	28
Owls	0	0	0	3	3

- Date: September 18, 2021
- Location: Lincoln Financial Field
  Philadelphia, PA
- Game start: 12:03 p.m. EDT
- Elapsed time: 3 hours and 22 minutes
- Game attendance: 25,290
- Game weather: 81 °F (27 °C) • Weather: Sunny • Wind: NW 9 MPH
- Referee: Gary Patterson
- TV announcers (ESPNU): John Schriffen (play–by–play) and Rene Ingoglia (analyst)

Scoring summary
1	13:21	BC	Jaden Williams 19-yard pass from Dennis Grosel (Connor Lytton kick) (3 plays, 29 yards, 1:39)	BC 7–0
1	00:36	BC	Pat Garwo III 1-yard rush (Connor Lytton kick) (10 plays, 66 yards, 7:59)	BC 14–0
2	00:48	BC	Travis Levy 2-yard rush (Connor Lytton kick) (4 plays, 57 yards, 2:22)	BC 21–0
4	13:09	TEM	Rory Bell 22-yard field goal (11 plays, 47 yards, 5:21)	BC 21–3
4	04:14	BC	Dennis Grosel 2-yard rush (Connor Lytton kick) (8 plays, 58 yards, 4:34)	BC 28–3

Statistics	Boston College	Temple
First downs	13	13
Total yards	221	245
Rushing yards	179	84
Passing yards	59	161
Turnovers	1	0
Time of possession	28:40	31:20

Team	Category	Player	Statistics
Boston College	Passing	Dennis Grosel	7/15, 59 yards, 1 TD, 1 INT
Boston College	Rushing	Pat Garwo III	17 carries, 48 yards, 1 TD
Boston College	Receiving	CJ Lewis	2 receptions, 21 yards
Temple	Passing	Justin Lynch	17/24, 161 yards
Temple	Rushing	Justin Lynch	21 carries, 27 yards
Temple	Receiving	Jadan Blue	3 receptions, 40 yards

=== Wagner ===
Wagner at Temple

Team	1	2	3	4	Total
Seahawks	7	0	0	0	7
• Owls	0	17	17	7	41

- Date: September 25, 2021
- Location: Lincoln Financial Field
  Philadelphia, PA
- Game start: 12:05 p.m. EDT
- Elapsed time: 3 hours and 4 minutes
- Game attendance: 20,179
- Game weather: 76 °F (24 °C) • Weather: Sunny • Wind: NW 5 MPH
- Referee: Nate Black
- TV announcers (ESPN+): Bill Spaulding (play–by–play) and Barrett Brooks (analyst)

Scoring summary
1	10:24	WAG	Guenson Alexis 1-yard rush (Austin Hosier kick) (9 plays, 80 yards, 10:24)	WAG 7–0
2	11:57	TEM	Kyle Dobbins 1-yard rush (Rory Bell kick) (11 plays, 81 yards, 6:06)	TIE 7–7
2	06:43	TEM	Rory Bell 47-yard field goal (8 plays, 27 yards, 3:01)	TEM 10–7
2	04:20	TEM	Kyle Dobbins 1-yard rush (Rory Bell kick) (3 plays, 20 yards, 1:09)	TEM 17–7
3	11:48	TEM	Rory Bell 31-yard field goal (8 plays, 61 yards, 3:12)	TEM 20–7
3	07:03	TEM	Kyle Dobbins 5-yard rush (Rory Bell kick) (7 plays, 77 yards, 2:51)	TEM 27–7
3	05:12	TEM	Kadas Reams 44-yard pass from D'Wan Mathis (Rory Bell kick) (3 plays, 50 yards, 0:57)	TEM 34–7
4	06:25	TEM	Kadas Reams 21-yard pass from D'Wan Mathis (Rory Bell kick) (10 plays, 95 yards, 4:48)	TEM 41–7

Statistics	Wagner	Temple
First downs	8	22
Total yards	159	407
Rushing yards	123	115
Passing yards	36	292
Turnovers	1	1
Time of possession	30:54	29:06

Team	Category	Player	Statistics
Wagner	Passing	Guenson Alexis	4/8, 36 yards, 1 INT
Wagner	Rushing	Rickey Spruill	14 carries, 73 yards
Wagner	Receiving	Jeremiah Lorick	3 receptions, 33 yards
Temple	Passing	D'Wan Mathis	22/32, 292 yards, 2 TDs
Temple	Rushing	Kyle Dobbins	13 carries, 61 yards, 3 TDs
Temple	Receiving	Jose Barbon	8 receptions, 130 yards

=== Memphis ===
Memphis at Temple

Team	1	2	3	4	Total
Tigers	3	14	6	8	31
• Owls	0	17	7	10	34

- Date: October 2, 2021
- Location: Lincoln Financial Field
  Philadelphia, PA
- Game start: 12:00 p.m. EDT
- Elapsed time: 3 hours and 23 minutes
- Game attendance: 28,573
- Game weather: 72 °F (22 °C) • Weather: Sunny • Wind: SW 12 MPH
- Referee: Hank Johns
- TV announcers (ESPNU): Kevin Brown (play-by-play) and Hutson Mason (analyst)

Scoring summary
1	5:21	MEM	Joe Doyle 26-yard field goal (17 plays, 84 yards, 5:09)	MEM 3–0
2	14:54	MEM	Rodrigues Clark 6-yard run (Joe Doyle kick) (7 plays, 72 yards, 1:35)	MEM 10–0
2	12:38	MEM	Javon Ivory 35-yard pass from Seth Henigan (Joe Doyle kick) (1 play, 35 yards, 0:08)	MEM 17–0
2	5:03	TEM	Jadan Blue 1-yard pass from D'Wan Mathis (Rory Bell kick) (17 plays, 75 yards, 7:35)	MEM 17–7
2	3:37	TEM	Jose Barbon 15-yard pass from D'Wan Mathis (Rory Bell kick) (3 plays, 17 yards, 0:53)	MEM 17–14
2	0:00	TEM	Rory Bell 35-yard field goal (9 plays, 46 yards, 2:07)	TIED 17–17
3	7:15	MEM	Sean Dykes 2-yard pass from Seth Henigan (Joe Doyle kick blocked) (11 plays, 69 yards, 4:40)	MEM 23–17
3	1:14	TEM	Tayvon Ruley 1-yard run (Rory Bell kick) (13 plays, 75 yards, 6:01)	TEM 24–23
4	6:16	TEM	Rory Bell 32-yard field goal (9 plays, 71 yards, 3:36)	TEM 27–23
4	2:35	TEM	Amad Anderson Jr. 53-yard pass from D'Wan Mathis (Rory Bell kick) (3 plays, 57 yards, 0:18)	TEM 34–23
4	0:30	MEM	Javon Ivory 9-yard pass from Seth Henigan (Calvin Austin III pass) (11 plays, 75 yards, 2:05)	TEM 34–31

Statistics	Memphis	Temple
First downs	25	23
Total yards	462	479
Rushing yards	157	157
Passing yards	305	322
Turnovers	2	0
Time of possession	24:33	35:27

Team	Category	Player	Statistics
Memphis	Passing	Seth Henigan	24/40, 305 yards, 3 TD
Memphis	Rushing	Rodrigues Clark	18 carries, 92 yards, TD
Memphis	Receiving	Calvin Austin III	8 receptions, 104 yards
Temple	Passing	D'Wan Mathis	35/49, 322 yards, 3 TD
Temple	Rushing	Edward Saydee	12 carries, 62 yards
Temple	Receiving	Amad Anderson Jr.	3 receptions, 108 yards, TD

=== At No. 5 Cincinnati ===
Temple at Cincinnati

Team	1	2	3	4	Total
Owls	0	3	0	0	3
• No. 5 Bearcats	10	7	28	7	52

- Date: October 8, 2021
- Location: Nippert Stadium
  Cincinnati, OH
- Game start: 7:05 p.m. EDT
- Elapsed time: 3 hours and 18 minutes
- Game attendance: 37,978
- Game weather: 75 °F (24 °C) • Weather: Sunny • Wind: SE 2 MPH
- Referee: Edwin Lee
- TV announcers (ESPN): Clay Matvick (play-by-play), Rocky Boiman (analyst), and Tiffany Blackmon (sideline)

Scoring summary
1	07:15	CIN	Cole Smith 30-yard FG (10 plays, 48 yards, 4:26)	CIN 0–3
1	02:52	CIN	Alec Pierce 9-yard pass from Desmond Ridder (Cole Smith kick) (2 plays, 13 yards, 0:34)	CIN 0–10
2	09:42	CIN	Jerome Ford 8-yard run (Cole Smith kick) (11 plays, 65 yards, 5:10)	CIN 0–17
2	05:27	TEM	Rory Bell 55-yard FG (9 plays, 37 yards, 4:03)	CIN 3–17
3	14:50	CIN	Jerome Ford 75-yard run (Cole Smith kick) (1 play, 75 yards, 0:10)	CIN 3–24
3	11:00	CIN	Tyler Scott 38-yard pass from Desmond Ridder (Cole Smith kick) (2 plays, 54 yards, 0:41)	CIN 3–31
3	07:45	CIN	Charles McClelland 28-yard run (Cole Smith kick) (3 plays, 61 yards, 1:04)	CIN 3–38
3	00:54	CIN	Michael Young 11-yard pass from Desmond Ridder (Cole Smith kick) (10 plays, 76 yards, 4:03)	CIN 3–45
4	10:15	CIN	Ethan Wright 58-yard run (Cole Smith kick) (5 plays, 77 yards, 2:14)	CIN 3–52

Statistics	Temple	Cincinnati
First downs	14	23
Total yards	235	542
Rushing yards	85	279
Passing yards	150	263
Time of possession	31:59	28:01

Team	Category	Player	Statistics
Temple	Passing	D'Wan Mathis	16/27, 120 yards, 1 INT
Temple	Rushing	Justin Lynch	3 carries, 29 yards
Temple	Receiving	Jose Barbon	5 receptions, 45 yards
Cincinnati	Passing	Desmond Ridder	22/30, 259 yards, 3 TD
Cincinnati	Rushing	Jerome Ford	15 carries, 149 yards, 2 TD
Cincinnati	Receiving	Alec Pierce	6 receptions, 93 yards, 1 TD

=== At South Florida ===
Temple at South Florida

Team	1	2	Total
Owls			0
Bulls			0

- Date: October 23, 2021
- Location: Raymond James Stadium
  Tampa, FL
- Game start: 7:00 EDT
- Elapsed time:
- Game attendance:
- Game weather: • Weather: TBD • Wind: TBD
- Referee:
- TV announcers (ESPN+): Courtney Lyle (play-by-play) and Brandon Weeden (analyst)

Scoring summary
1
2
3
4

Over/under

Statistics	Temple	South Florida
First downs		
Total yards		
Rushing yards		
Passing yards		
Turnovers		
Time of possession		

Team	Category	Player	Statistics
Temple	Passing		
Temple	Rushing		
Temple	Receiving		
South Florida	Passing		
South Florida	Rushing		
South Florida	Receiving		

=== UCF ===
Central Florida at Temple

Team	1	2	3	4	Total
• Knights	7	14	21	7	49
Owls	0	0	0	7	7

- Date: October 30, 2021
- Location: Lincoln Financial Field
  Philadelphia, PA
- Game start: 12:00 EDT
- Elapsed time:
- Game attendance:
- Game weather: • Weather: TBD • Wind: TBD
- Referee:
- TV announcers (ESPN+): Richard Cross (play-by-play) and Leger Douzable (analyst)

Scoring summary
1
2
3
4

Over/under

Statistics	UCF	Temple
First downs		
Total yards		
Rushing yards		
Passing yards		
Turnovers		
Time of possession		

Team	Category	Player	Statistics
UCF	Passing		
UCF	Rushing		
UCF	Receiving		
Temple	Passing		
Temple	Rushing		
Temple	Receiving		

=== At East Carolina ===
Temple at East Carolina

Team	1	2	Total
Owls			0
Pirates			0

- Date: November 6, 2021
- Location: Dowdy–Ficklen Stadium
  Greenville, NC
- Game start: TBD EDT
- Elapsed time:
- Game attendance:
- Game weather: • Weather: TBD • Wind: TBD
- Referee:
- TV announcers (ESPN+): Courtney Lyle (play-by-play) and Brandon Weeden (analyst)

Scoring summary
1
2
3
4

Over/under

Statistics	Temple	East Carolina
First downs		
Total yards		
Rushing yards		
Passing yards		
Turnovers		
Time of possession		

Team	Category	Player	Statistics
Temple	Passing		
Temple	Rushing		
Temple	Receiving		
East Carolina	Passing		
East Carolina	Rushing		
East Carolina	Receiving		

=== Houston ===
Houston at Temple

Team	1	2	3	4	Total
• Cougars	7	3	14	13	37
Owls	0	0	0	8	8

- Date: November 13, 2021
- Location: Lincoln Financial Field
  Philadelphia, PA
- Game start: 12:00 p.m. EST
- Elapsed time: 3 hours and 16 minutes
- Game attendance: 18,440
- Game weather: 82 °F (28 °C) • Weather: Cloudy • Wind: S 13 MPH
- Referee: Edwin Lee
- TV announcers (ESPN+): Courtney Lyle (play-by-play) and Leger Douzable (analyst)

Scoring summary
1	8:47	HOU	Alton McCaskill 3-yard run (Dalton Witherspoon kick) (7 plays, 47 yards, 3:30)	HOU 7–0
2	7:46	HOU	Dalton Witherspoon 39-yard field goal (13 plays, 58 yards, 7:09)	HOU 10–0
3	11:29	HOU	Ta'Zhawn Henry 6-yard run (Dalton Witherspoon kick) (8 plays, 65 yards, 3:31)	HOU 17–0
3	4:00	HOU	Alton McCaskill 34-yard run (Dalton Witherspoon kick) (5 plays, 52 yards, 2:05)	HOU 24–0
4	14:22	TEM	Edward Saydee 1-yard run (Justin Lynch pass to Darius Pittman for two-point conversion) (4 plays, 45 yards, 0:56)	HOU 24–8
4	10:57	HOU	Jaylen Erwin 35-yard pass from Clayton Tune (Dalton Witherspoon PAT blocked) (7 plays, 77 yards, 3:23)	HOU 30–8
4	6:13	HOU	Seth Green 6-yard pass from Clayton Tune (Dalton Witherspoon kick) (6 plays, 42 yards, 2:28)	HOU 37–8

Line	Over/under
HOU –25.0	53

Statistics	Houston	Temple
First downs	24	10
Total yards	446	218
Rushing yards	217	99
Passing yards	229	119
Turnovers	0	3
Time of possession	39:22	20:38

Team	Category	Player	Statistics
Houston	Passing	Clayton Tune	21/34, 224 yards, 2 TDs
Houston	Rushing	Alton McCaskill	21 rushes, 129 yards, 2 TDs
Houston	Receiving	Seth Green	7 receptions, 74 yards, 1 TD
Temple	Passing	Justin Lynch	11/24, 119 yards, 2 INTs
Temple	Rushing	Justin Lynch	14 rushes, 78 yards
Temple	Receiving	Randle Jones	5 receptions, 36 yards

=== At Tulsa ===
Temple at Tulsa

Team	1	2	3	4	Total
Owls	0	0	10	0	10
• Golden Hurricane	10	17	7	10	44

- Date: November 20, 2021
- Location: Skelly Field at H. A. Chapman Stadium
  Tulsa, OK
- Game start: 4:00 p.m. EST
- Elapsed time:
- Game attendance: 16,731
- Game weather: • Weather: TBD • Wind: TBD
- Referee:
- TV announcers (ESPN+): Ted Emrich (play-by-play) and Brandon Weeden (analyst)

Scoring summary
1
2
3
4

Over/under

Statistics	Temple	Tulsa
First downs		
Total yards		
Rushing yards		
Passing yards		
Turnovers		
Time of possession		

Team	Category	Player	Statistics
Temple	Passing		
Temple	Rushing		
Temple	Receiving		
Tulsa	Passing		
Tulsa	Rushing		
Tulsa	Receiving		

=== Navy ===
Navy at Temple

Team	1	2	3	4	Total
• Midshipmen	7	10	7	14	38
Owls	0	7	7	0	14

- Date: November 27, 2021
- Location: Lincoln Financial Field
  Philadelphia, PA
- Game start: 12:00 p.m. EST
- Elapsed time: 3 hours, 2 minutes
- Game attendance:
- Game weather: 39 °F (4 °C) • Weather: Cloudy • Wind: NW 18 MPH
- Referee: 16,708
- TV announcers (ESPNU): Kevin Brown (play-by-play) and Hutson Mason (analyst)

Scoring summary
1	4:33	NAVY	Carlinos Acie 11–yard run (Bijan Nichols kick) (5 plays, 27 yards, 2:22)	NAVY 7–0
2	10:40	NAVY	Chance Warren 15–yard pass from Xavier Arline (Bijan Nichols kick) (13 plays, 71 yards, 6:40)	NAVY 14–0
2	8:30	TEM	Ra'Von Bonner 1–yard run (Rory Bell kick) (1 play, 1 yard, 0:04)	NAVY 14–7
2	0:11	NAVY	Bijan Nichols 32–yard field goal (4 plays, –8 yards, 1:23)	NAVY 17–7
3	6:43	NAVY	Isaac Ruoss 3–yard run (Bijan Nichols kick) (11 plays, 58 yards, 5:22)	NAVY 24–7
3	0:47	TEM	Tayvon Ruley 4–yard run (Rory Bell kick) (14 plays, 80 yards, 5:51)	NAVY 24–14
4	9:04	NAVY	Isaac Ruoss 6-yard run (Bijan Nichols kick) (12 plays, 75 yards, 6:43)	NAVY 31–14
4	1:40	NAVY	Chance Warren 4–yard pass from Tai Lavatai (Bijan Nichols kick) (12 plays, 57 yards, 5:53)	NAVY 38–14

Statistics	Navy	Temple
First downs	21	11
Total yards	291	182
Rushing yards	219	84
Passing yards	72	98
Turnovers	1	3
Time of possession	37:11	22:49

Team	Category	Player	Statistics
Navy	Passing	Tai Lavatai	5/11, 57 yards, TD
Navy	Rushing	Carlinos Acie	10 carries, 86 yards, TD
Navy	Receiving	Chance Warren	3 receptions, 43 yards, 2 TD
Temple	Passing	Mariano Valenti	10/14, 73 yards
Temple	Rushing	Tayvon Ruley	9 carries, 68 yards, TD
Temple	Receiving	Jose Barbon	5 receptions, 34 yards
