= 2021 South Florida Bulls football team =

American college football season

2021 South Florida Bulls football
- Conference: American Athletic Conference
- Record: 2–10 (1–7 AAC)
- Head coach: Jeff Scott (2nd season)
- Offensive coordinator: Charlie Weis Jr. (2nd season)
- Offensive scheme: Spread
- Defensive coordinator: Glenn Spencer (2nd season)
- Base defense: 4–2–5
- Home stadium: Raymond James Stadium

2021 American Athletic Conference football standings
	Conf.			Overall
Team	W		L	W		L
No. 4 Cincinnati y$^	8	–	0	13	–	1
No. 17 Houston y	8	–	0	12	–	2
UCF	5	–	3	9	–	4
East Carolina	5	–	3	7	–	5
Tulsa	5	–	3	7	–	6
SMU	4	–	4	8	–	4
Memphis	3	–	5	6	–	6
Navy	3	–	5	4	–	8
Tulane	1	–	7	2	–	10
South Florida	1	–	7	2	–	10
Temple	1	–	7	3	–	9
Championship: Cincinnati 35, Houston 20
^ – College Football Playoff participant; $ – Conference champion; y – Championship game participant; Rankings from AP Poll

The 2021 South Florida Bulls football team represented the University of South Florida (USF) during the 2021 NCAA Division I FBS football season. The Bulls were led by second-year head coach Jeff Scott and played their home games at Raymond James Stadium in Tampa, Florida. This season was the ninth for the Bulls as members of the American Athletic Conference and 25th season overall.

== Staff ==
Name	Position	Seasons at South Florida	Alma mater
Jeff Scott	Head Coach	2	Clemson (2003)
Glenn Spencer	Defensive Coordinator / Safeties	2	Georgia Tech (1987)
Charlie Weis Jr.	Offensive Coordinator / Quarterbacks	2	Kansas (2015)
Allen Mogridge	Assistant Head Coach / Offensive Line	2	North Carolina(1999)
Cam Aiken	Running Backs/Run Game Coordinator	1	Clemson (2013)
George Barlow	Cornerbacks	1	Marshall (1990)
Bobby Bentley	Wide Receivers/Pass Game Coordinator	1	Presbyterian (1990)
Da'Quan Bowers	Defensive Line	2	Clemson (2019)
Daniel Da Prato	Special Teams Coordinator	1	Louisiana–Monroe (2003)
Xavier Dye	Tight Ends/Recruiting Coordinator	2	Clemson (2010)
Ernie Sims	Linebackers	2	FSU (2006)
Brad Scott	Chief of Staff	2	South Florida (1979)
A.J. Artis	Director of Football Strength & Conditioning	1	Campbell (2015)
Brandon Roberts	Assistant Strength & Conditioning Coach	2	Middle Tennessee State (2009)

== Preseason ==
=== American Athletic Conference preseason media poll ===
Patch worn on the Bulls jerseys and helmets to celebrate the football team's 25th season

The American Athletic Conference preseason media poll was released at the virtual media day held August 4, 2021. Cincinnati, who finished the 2020 season ranked No. 8 nationally, was tabbed as the preseason favorite in the 2021 preseason media poll.

Media poll
Predicted finish	Team	Votes (1st place)
1	Cincinnati	262 (22)
2	UCF	241 (2)
3	SMU	188
4	Houston	181
5	Memphis	168
6	Tulsa	153
7	Tulane	132
т-8	East Carolina	85
т-8	Navy	85
10	Temple	46
11	South Florida	43

== Schedule ==
Date	Time	Opponent	Site	TV	Result	Attendance
September 2	7:30 p.m.	at NC State*	Carter–Finley Stadium; Raleigh, NC	ACCN	L 0–45	52,633
September 11	1:00 p.m.	No. 13 Florida*	Raymond James Stadium; Tampa, FL	ABC	L 20–42	66,646
September 18	7:00 p.m.	Florida A&M*	Raymond James Stadium; Tampa, FL	ESPN+	W 38–17	29,475
September 25	10:15 p.m.	at No. 15 BYU*	LaVell Edwards Stadium; Provo, UT	ESPN2	L 27–35	60,217
October 2	4:00 p.m.	at SMU	Gerald J. Ford Stadium; University Park, TX	ESPNU	L 17–41	23,355
October 16	11:00 a.m.	Tulsa	Raymond James Stadium; Tampa, FL	ESPNU	L 31–32	21,767
October 23	7:00 p.m.	Temple	Raymond James Stadium; Tampa, FL	ESPN+	W 34–14	25,430
October 28	7:30 p.m.	at East Carolina	Dowdy–Ficklen Stadium; Greenville, NC	ESPN	L 14–29	32,015
November 6	7:30 p.m.	Houston^{†}	Raymond James Stadium; Tampa, FL	ESPNU	L 42–54	28,667
November 12	6:00 p.m.	No. 5 Cincinnati	Raymond James Stadium; Tampa, FL	ESPN2	L 28–45	30,780
November 20	12:00 p.m.	at Tulane	Yulman Stadium; New Orleans, LA	ESPN+	L 14–45	14,496
November 26	3:30 p.m.	at UCF	FBC Mortgage Stadium; Orlando, FL (War on I-4)	ESPN	L 13–17	41,157
*Non-conference game; ^{†}Homecoming; Rankings from AP Poll (and CFP Rankings, after November 2) - Released prior to game; All times are in Eastern time

== Game summaries ==
=== At NC State ===
South Florida at NC State

Team	1	2	3	4	Total
Bulls	0	0	0	0	0
• RV Wolfpack	10	14	14	7	45

- Date: September 2, 2021
- Location: Carter–Finley Stadium
  Raleigh, NC
- Game start: 7:33 p.m. EDT
- Elapsed time: 3 hours and 5 minutes
- Game attendance: 52,633
- Game weather: 73 °F (23 °C) • Weather: Sunny
- Referee: Charles Lamertina
- TV announcers (ACC Network): Dave O'Brien (play–by–play), Tim Hasselbeck (analyst), and Kelsey Riggs (sideline reporter)

Scoring summary
1	09:36	NCST	Ricky Person Jr. 33-yard pass from Devin Leary (Christopher Dunn kick) (9 plays, 76 yards, 3:26)	NCST 7–0
1	02:14	NCST	Christopher Dunn 34-yard field goal (9 plays, 30 yards, 3:48)	NCST 10–0
2	12:39	NCST	Ricky Person Jr. 11-yard rush (Christopher Dunn kick) (6 plays, 70 yards, 2:24)	NCST 17–0
2	00:48	NCST	Ricky Person Jr. 11-yard rush (Christopher Dunn kick) (3 plays, 77 yards, 0:22)	NCST 24–0
3	09:30	NCST	Zonovan Knight 46-yard rush (Christopher Dunn kick) (4 plays, 54 yards, 1:31)	NCST 31–0
3	02:53	NCST	Christopher Toudle 7-yard pass from Devin Leary (Christopher Dunn kick) (8 plays, 74 yards, 3:31)	NCST 38–0
4	08:14	NCST	Jordan Houston 1-yard rush (Christopher Dunn kick) (11 plays, 55 yards, 6:30)	NCST 45–0

Statistics	South Florida	NC State
First downs	15	27
Total yards	271	525
Rushing yards	104	293
Passing yards	167	232
Turnovers	3	1
Time of possession	30:48	29:12

Team	Category	Player	Statistics
South Florida	Passing	Timmy McClain	7/13, 126 yards, 2 INTs
South Florida	Rushing	Jaren Mangham	5 carries, 26 yards
South Florida	Receiving	Xavier Weaver	2 receptions, 73 yards
NC State	Passing	Devin Leary	17/26, 232 yards, 2 TDs, 1 INT
NC State	Rushing	Zonovan Knight	16 carries, 163 yards, 1 TD
NC State	Receiving	Emeka Emezie	5 receptions, 71 yards

=== No. 13 Florida ===
Florida at South Florida

Team	1	2	3	4	Total
• No. 13 Gators	14	21	0	7	42
Bulls	3	0	10	7	20

- Date: September 11, 2021
- Location: Raymond James Stadium
  Tampa, FL
- Game start: 1:06 p.m. EDT
- Elapsed time: 3 hours and 25 minutes
- Game attendance: 66,646
- Game weather: 82 °F (28 °C) • Weather: Cloudy
- Referee: Hank Johns
- TV announcers (ABC): Bob Wischusen (play–by–play), Dan Orlovsky (analyst), and Kris Budden (sideline reporter)

Scoring summary
1	11:06	FLA	Dameon Pierce 7-yard rush (Chris Howard kick) (4 plays, 63 yards, 1:26)	FLA 7–0
1	04:45	USF	Spencer Shrader 25-yard field goal (17 plays, 75 yards, 6:21)	FLA 7–3
1	04:34	FLA	Jacob Copeland 75-yard pass from Anthony Richardson (Chris Howard kick) (1 play, 75 yards, 0:11)	FLA 14–3
2	12:36	FLA	Xzavier Henderson 35-yard pass from Emory Jones (Chris Howard kick) (8 plays, 67 yards, 3:36)	FLA 21–3
2	09:18	FLA	Jaocb Copeland 41-yard pass from Anthony Richardson (Jace Christmann kick) (6 plays, 80 yards, 2:37)	FLA 28–3
2	06:41	FLA	Emory Jones 33-yard rush (Chris Howard kick) (3 plays, 51 yards, 1:20)	FLA 35–3
3	09:18	USF	Spencer Shrader 32-yard field goal (4 plays, -5 yards, 1:47)	FLA 35–6
3	04:41	USF	Jaren Mangham 1-yard rush (Spencer Shrader kick) (5 plays, 43 yards, 1:31)	FLA 35–13
4	10:29	FLA	Anthony Richardson 30-yard rush (Chris Howard kick) (1 play, 80 yards, 0:14)	FLA 42–13
4	04:22	USF	Jaren Mangham 2-yard rush (Spencer Shrader kick) (5 plays, 27 yards, 1:46)	FLA 42–20

Statistics	Florida	South Florida
First downs	26	20
Total yards	666	297
Rushing yards	363	109
Passing yards	303	188
Turnovers	2	1
Time of possession	30:42	29:18

Team	Category	Player	Statistics
Florida	Passing	Anthony Richardson	3/3, 152 yards, 2 TDs
Florida	Rushing	Anthony Richardson	4 carries, 115 yards, 1 TD
Florida	Receiving	Jacob Copeland	5 receptions, 175 yards, 2 TDs
South Florida	Passing	Cade Fortin	12/18, 91 yards, 1 INT
South Florida	Rushing	Darrian Felix	14 carries, 48 yards
South Florida	Receiving	Xavier Weaver	2 receptions, 68 yards

=== Florida A&M ===
Florida A&M at South Florida

Team	1	2	3	4	Total
Rattlers	3	0	7	7	17
• Bulls	10	14	7	7	38

- Date: September 18, 2021
- Location: Raymond James Stadium
  Tampa, FL
- Game start: 7:06 p.m. EDT
- Elapsed time: 3 hours and 33 minutes
- Game attendance: 29,475
- Game weather: 81 °F (27 °C) • Weather: Cloudy • Wind: N 7 MPH
- Referee: Tim Rich
- TV announcers (ESPN+): Drew Fellios (play–by–play) and Leger Douzable (analyst)

Scoring summary
1	09:39	USF	Spencer Shrader 49-yard field goal (4 plays, 5 yards, 1:26)	USF 3–0
1	07:27	FAMU	Jose Romo-Martinez 49-yard field goal (7 plays, 43 yards, 2:12)	TIE 3–3
1	03:43	USF	Jaren Mangham 2-yard rush (Spencer Shrader kick) (8 plays, 75 yards, 3:44)	USF 10–3
2	13:47	USF	Xavier Weaver 9-yard pass from Timmy McClain (Spencer Shrader kick) (10 plays, 49 yards, 3:23)	USF 17–3
2	03:31	USF	Jaren Mangham 4-yard rush (Spencer Shrader kick) (7 plays, 26 yards, 2:25)	USF 24–3
3	04:53	FAMU	Terrell Jennings 33-yard rush (Jose Romo-Martinez kick) (8 plays, 82 yards, 3:27)	USF 24–10
3	02:02	USF	Jaren Mangham 9-yard rush (Spencer Shrader kick) (6 plays, 87 yards, 2:43)	USF 31–10
4	06:10	FAMU	Jah'Marae Sheread 6-yard pass from Rasean McKay (Jose Romo-Martinez kick) (6 plays, 20 yards, 2:39)	USF 31–17
4	00:18	USF	Yasias Young 1-yard rush (Spencer Shrader kick) (4 plays, 14 yards, 1:55)	USF 38–17

Statistics	Florida A&M	South Florida
First downs	20	22
Total yards	380	406
Rushing yards	132	243
Passing yards	248	163
Turnovers	1	1
Time of possession	29:38	30:14

Team	Category	Player	Statistics
Florida A&M	Passing	Rasean McKay	25/49, 248 yards, 1 TD
Florida A&M	Rushing	Terrell Jennings	6 carries, 93 yards, 1 TD
Florida A&M	Receiving	Xavier Smith	15 receptions, 139 yards
South Florida	Passing	Timmy McClain	12/23, 163 yards, 1 TD
South Florida	Rushing	Brian Battie	10 carries, 139 yards
South Florida	Receiving	Xavier Weaver	5 receptions, 77 yards, 1 TD

=== At No. 15 BYU ===
South Florida at BYU

Team	1	2	3	4	Total
Bulls	0	6	14	7	27
• No. 15 Cougars	21	7	7	0	35

- Date: September 25, 2021
- Location: LaVell Edwards Stadium
  Provo, UT
- Game start: 10:25 p.m. EDT
- Elapsed time: 3 hours and 5 minutes
- Game attendance: 60,217
- Game weather: 72 °F (22 °C) • Weather: Sunny • Wind: NW 1 MPH
- Referee: Luke Richmond
- TV announcers (ESPN2): Beth Mowins (play-by-play), Kirk Morrison (analyst), and Dawn Davenport (sideline)

Scoring summary
1	13:05	BYU	Masen Wake 5-yard pass from Baylor Romney (Justen Smith kick) (4 plays, 75 yards, 1:55)	BYU 7–0
1	09:16	BYU	Tyler Allgeier 1-yard rush (Justen Smith kick) (5 plays, 65 yards, 1:44)	BYU 14–0
1	04:20	BYU	Tyler Allgeier 1-yard rush (Justen Smith kick) (8 plays, 34 yards, 3:33)	BYU 21–0
2	12:41	USF	Spencer Shrader 29-yard field goal (13 plays, 69 yards, 6:39)	BYU 21–3
2	04:57	USF	Spencer Shrader 42-yard field goal (12 plays, 55 yards, 5:07)	BYU 21–6
2	01:06	BYU	Neil Pau'u 9-yard pass from Baylor Romney (Justen Smith kick) (7 plays, 75 yards, 3:51)	BYU 28–6
3	07:25	USF	Xavier Weaver 3-yard rush (Spencer Shrader kick) (14 plays, 75 yards, 7:35)	BYU 28–13
3	05:40	BYU	Gunner Romney 47-yard pass from Baylor Romney (Justen Smith kick) (4 plays, 75 yards, 1:45)	BYU 35–13
3	03:03	USF	Jaren Mangham 2-yard rush (Spencer Shrader kick) (6 plays, 54 yards, 2:37)	BYU 35–20
4	05:41	USF	Jaren Mangham 1-yard rush (Spencer Shrader kick) (19 plays, 94 yards, 9:05)	BYU 7–0

Statistics	South Florida	BYU
First downs	23	21
Total yards	360	448
Rushing yards	174	143
Passing yards	186	305
Turnovers	1	1
Time of possession	35:37	24:23

Team	Category	Player	Statistics
South Florida	Passing	Timmy McClain	17/24, 186 yards
South Florida	Rushing	Jaren Mangham	26 carries, 86 yards, 2 TDs
South Florida	Receiving	Xavier Weaver	5 receptions, 76 yards
BYU	Passing	Baylor Romney	20/25, 305 yards, 3 TDs
BYU	Rushing	Tyler Allgeier	15 carries, 86 yards, 2 TDs
BYU	Receiving	Gunner Romney	5 receptions, 119 yards, 1 TD

=== At SMU ===
South Florida at SMU

Team	1	2	3	4	Total
Bulls	0	3	14	0	17
• Mustangs	10	7	10	14	41

- Date: October 2, 2021
- Location: Gerald J. Ford Stadium
  University Park, TX
- Game start: 4:00 p.m. EDT
- Elapsed time: 3 hours and 21 minutes
- Game attendance: 23,355
- Game weather: Temperature: 84 °F (29 °C) • Weather: Cloudy • Wind: W 8 MPH
- Referee: Edwin Lee
- TV announcers (ESPNU): Mike Couzens (play-by-play) and Dustin Fox (analyst)

Scoring summary
1	10:50	SMU	Reggie Roberson Jr. 21-yard pass from Tanner Mordecai (Blake Mazza kick) (12 plays, 75 yards, 4:10)	SMU 7–0
1	4:40	SMU	Blake Mazza 26-yard field goal (11 plays, 65 yards, 4:21)	SMU 10–0
2	12:05	SMU	Rashee Rice 10-yard pass from Tanner Mordecai (Blake Mazza kick) (13 plays, 97 yards, 4:41)	SMU 17–0
2	4:37	USF	Spencer Shrader 29-yard field goal (14 plays, 63 yards, 7:28)	SMU 17–3
3	12:50	USF	Jaren Mangham 1-yard run (Spencer Shrader kick) (7 plays, 75 yards, 2:10)	SMU 17–10
3	8:56	SMU	Blake Mazza 30-yard field goal (11 plays, 63 yards, 3:54)	SMU 20–10
3	4:25	SMU	Tre Siggers 13-yard run (Blake Mazza kick) (5 plays, 58 yards, 2:30)	SMU 27–10
3	0:29	USF	Jaren Mangham 1-yard run (Spencer Shrader kick) (10 plays, 75 yards, 3:56)	SMU 27–17
4	9:32	SMU	Danny Gray 4-yard pass from Tanner Mordecai (Blake Mazza kick) (4 plays, 50 yards, 1:44)	SMU 34–17
4	5:09	SMU	Danny Gray 5-yard pass from Tanner Mordecai (Blake Mazza kick) (6 plays, 30 yards, 3:04)	SMU 41–17

Statistics	South Florida	SMU
First downs	19	30
Total yards	336	463
Rushing yards	113	162
Passing yards	223	301
Turnovers	1	1
Time of possession	27:11	32:49

Team	Category	Player	Statistics
South Florida	Passing	Timmy McClain	14/22, 223 yards
South Florida	Rushing	Brian Battie	7 rushes, 46 yards
South Florida	Receiving	Jimmy Horn Jr.	5 receptions, 102 yards
SMU	Passing	Tanner Mordecai	29/42, 301 yards, 4 TD, INT
SMU	Rushing	Tre Siggers	20 rushes, 86 yards, TD
SMU	Receiving	Danny Gray	7 receptions, 74 yards, 2 TD

=== Tulsa ===
Tulsa at South Florida

Team	1	2	Total
Golden Hurricane			0
Bulls			0

- Date: October 16, 2021
- Location: Raymond James Stadium
  Tampa, FL
- Game start: 12:00 p.m. EDT
- Elapsed time:
- Game attendance: 21,767
- Game weather: • Weather: TBD • Wind: TBD
- Referee:
- TV announcers (ESPNU): Mike Couzens (play-by-play) and Dustin Fox (analyst)

Scoring summary
1
2
3
4

Over/under

Statistics	Tulsa	South Florida
First downs		
Total yards		
Rushing yards		
Passing yards		
Turnovers		
Time of possession		

Team	Category	Player	Statistics
Tulsa	Passing		
Tulsa	Rushing		
Tulsa	Receiving		
South Florida	Passing		
South Florida	Rushing		
South Florida	Receiving		

=== Temple ===
Temple at South Florida

Team	1	2	Total
Owls			0
Bulls			0

- Date: October 23, 2021
- Location: Raymond James Stadium
  Tampa, FL
- Game start: 7:00 EDT
- Elapsed time:
- Game attendance:
- Game weather: • Weather: TBD • Wind: TBD
- Referee:
- TV announcers (ESPN+): Courtney Lyle (play-by-play) and Brandon Weeden (analyst)

Scoring summary
1
2
3
4

Over/under

Statistics	Temple	South Florida
First downs		
Total yards		
Rushing yards		
Passing yards		
Turnovers		
Time of possession		

Team	Category	Player	Statistics
Temple	Passing		
Temple	Rushing		
Temple	Receiving		
South Florida	Passing		
South Florida	Rushing		
South Florida	Receiving		

=== At East Carolina ===
South Florida at East Carolina

Team	1	2	3	4	Total
Bulls	0	14	0	0	14
• Pirates	0	6	13	10	29

- Date: October 28, 2021
- Location: Dowdy–Ficklen Stadium
  Greenville, SC
- Game start: 7:35 p.m. EDT
- Elapsed time: 3 hours and 26 minutes
- Game attendance: 32,015
- Game weather: 64 °F (18 °C) • Weather: Cloudy • Wind: E 8 MPH
- Referee: Hank Johns
- TV announcers (ESPN): Matt Barrie (play-by-play), Roddy Jones (analyst), and Lauren Sisler (sideline)

Scoring summary
2	14:55	ECU	Rahjai Harris 13-yard run (14 plays, 83 yards, 6:45)	ECU 6–0
2	8:43	USF	Jaren Mangham 24-yard (Spencer Shrader kick) (6 plays, 87 yards, 2:45)	USF 7–6
2	8:12	USF	Xavier Weaver 13-yard pass from Katravis Marsh (Spencer Shrader kick) (3 plays, 25 yards, 0:25)	USF 14–6
3	10:30	ECU	Audie Omotosho 17-yard pass from Holton Ahlers (Owen Daffer kick) (11 plays, 57 yards, 4:22)	USF 14–13
3	2:38	ECU	Malik Fleming 31-yard interception	ECU 19–14
4	10:26	ECU	Keaton Mitchell 25-yard run (Owen Daffer kick) (10 plays, 80 yards, 4:34)	ECU 26–14
4	5:23	ECU	Owen Daffer 37-yard field goal (6 plays, 13 yards, 2:20)	ECU 29–14

Statistics	South Florida	East Carolina
First downs	19	30
Total yards	391	471
Rushing yards	199	251
Passing yards	192	220
Turnovers	4	3
Time of possession	21:38	38:22

Team	Category	Player	Statistics
South Florida	Passing	Katravis Marsh	15/30, 192 yards, TD, 3 INT
South Florida	Rushing	Kelley Joiner	12 carries, 103 yards
South Florida	Receiving	Xavier Weaver	5 receptions, 91 yards, TD
East Carolina	Passing	Holton Ahlers	21/35, 220 yards, TD
East Carolina	Rushing	Rahjai Harris	22 carries, 100 yards, TD
East Carolina	Receiving	C. J. Johnson	5 receptions, 84 yards

=== Houston ===
Houston at South Florida

Team	1	2	3	4	Total
• Cougars	9	17	21	7	54
Bulls	14	14	7	7	42

- Date: November 6, 2021
- Location: Raymond James Stadium
  Tampa, FL
- Game start: 7:30 p.m. EDT
- Elapsed time:
- Game attendance: 28,667
- Game weather: • Weather: TBD • Wind: TBD
- Referee: Tim Rich
- TV announcers (ESPNU): Mike Couzens (play-by-play) and Dustin Fox (analyst)

Scoring summary
1	14:47	USF	Brian Battie 100-yard kickoff return (Spencer Shrader kick) (0 plays, 0 yards, 0:13)	USF 7–0
1	8:35	HOU	Jake Herslow 18-yard pass from Clayton Tune (Dalton Witherspoon kick) (7 plays, 56 yards, 2:51)	TIE 7–7
1	6:44	USF	Brian Battie 29-yard run (Spencer Shrader kick) (5 plays, 75 yards, 1:51)	USF 14–7
1	3:34	HOU	Atlias Bell safety (3 plays, -1 yard, 0:44)	USF 14–9
2	14:52	HOU	Dalton Witherspoon 19-yard field goal (8 plays, 56 yards, 3:42)	USF 14–12
2	10:19	USF	Mitchell Brinkman 33-yard pass from Timmy McClain (Spencer Shrader kick) (10 plays, 75 yards, 4:33)	USF 21–12
2	8:19	HOU	Alton McCaskill 6-yard run (Dalton Witherspoon kick) (5 plays, 54 yards, 2:00)	USF 21–19
2	2:30	HOU	Tank Dell 55-yard pass from Clayton Tune (Dalton Witherspoon kick) (3 plays, 87 yards, 0:40)	HOU 26–21
2	2:16	USF	Brian Battie 100-yard kickoff return (Spencer Shrader kick) (0 plays, 0 yards, 0:14)	USF 28–26
3	12:50	HOU	Alton McCaskill 2-yard run (Dalton Witherspoon kick) (5 plays, 67 yards, 2:10)	HOU 33–28
3	10:04	HOU	Ta'Zhawn Henry 97-yard run (Dalton Witherspoon kick) (1 play, 97 yards, 0:14)	HOU 40–28
3	6:58	USF	Chris Carter 14-yard pass from Timmy McClain (Spencer Shrader kick) (11 plays, 65 yards, 3:06)	HOU 40–35
3	4:44	HOU	Jeremy Singleton 27-yard pass from Clayton Tune (Dalton Witherspoon kick) (5 plays, 75 yards, 2:14)	HOU 47–35
4	3:59	USF	Timmy McClain 11-yard run (Spencer Shrader kick) (9 plays, 60 yards, 2:34)	HOU 47–42
4	2:27	HOU	Alton McCaskill 16-yard run (Dalton Witherspoon kick) (3 plays, 44 yards, 1:32)	HOU 54–42

Statistics	Houston	South Florida
First downs	30	23
Total yards	646	399
Rushing yards	261	110
Passing yards	385	289
Turnovers	0	2
Time of possession	33:07	26:53

Team	Category	Player	Statistics
Houston	Passing	Clayton Tune	21/26, 385 yards, 3 TDs
Houston	Rushing	Ta'Zhawn Henry	10 rushes, 130 yards, 1 TD
Houston	Receiving	Tank Dell	8 receptions, 164 yards, 1 TD
South Florida	Passing	Timmy McClain	22/46, 289 yards, 2 TDs, 2 INTs
South Florida	Rushing	Timmy McClain	11 rushes, 46 yards, 1 TD
South Florida	Receiving	Xavier Weaver	6 receptions, 105 yards

=== No. 5 Cincinnati ===
Cincinnati at South Florida

Team	1	2	3	4	Total
• No. 5 Bearcats	7	17	7	14	45
Bulls	7	0	14	7	28

- Date: November 12, 2021
- Location: Raymond James Stadium
  Tampa, FL
- Game start: 6:00 p.m. EST
- Elapsed time: 3 hours and 31 minutes
- Game attendance: 30,780
- Game weather: 75 °F (24 °C) • Weather: Sunny • Wind: E 5 MPH
- Referee: Nate Black
- TV announcers (ESPN2): Jason Benetti (play-by-play), Andre Ware (analyst), and Paul Carcaterra (sideline)

Scoring summary
1	7:08	USF	Jaren Mangham 2-yard run (Spencer Shrader kick) (1 play, 2 yards, 0:05)	USF 0–7
1	2:57	CIN	Ryan Montgomery 12-yard run (Alex Bales kick) (9 plays, 75 yards, 4:11)	TIE 7–7
2	9:36	CIN	Desmond Ridder 13-yard run (Alex Bales kick) (11 plays, 73 yards, 5:31)	CIN 14–7
2	5:30	CIN	Tre Tucker 1-yard pass from Desmond Ridder (Alex Bales kick) (6 plays, 34 yards, 2:51)	CIN 21–7
2	0:00	CIN	Alex Bales 27-yard field goal (10 plays, 46 yards, 2:11)	CIN 24–7
3	11:48	CIN	Josh Whyle 21-yard pass from Desmond Ridder (Alex Bales kick) (8 plays, 66 yards, 3:12)	CIN 31–7
3	6:39	USF	Jaren Mangham 1-yard run (Spencer Shrader kick) (12 plays, 75 yards, 5:09)	CIN 31–14
3	3:48	USF	Jimmy Horn Jr. 80-yard pass from Timmy McClain (Spencer Shrader kick) (1 play, 80 yards, 0:13)	CIN 31–21
4	14:00	CIN	Ethan Wright 1-yard run (Alex Bales kick) (10 plays, 73 yards, 4:48)	CIN 38–21
4	6:14	USF	Timmy McClain 2-yard run (Spencer Shrader kick) (16 plays, 98 yards, 5:13)	CIN 38–28
4	1:22	CIN	Ryan Montgomery 55-yard run (Alex Bales kick) (1 play, 55 yards, 0:11)	CIN 45–28

Statistics	Cincinnati	South Florida
First downs	30	21
Total yards	506	346
Rushing yards	202	101
Passing yards	304	245
Turnovers		
Time of possession	32:30	27:30

Team	Category	Player	Statistics
Cincinnati	Passing	Desmond Ridder	31/39, 304 yards, 2 TD, 1 INT
Cincinnati	Rushing	Ryan Montgomery	6 carries, 72 yards, 2 TD
Cincinnati	Receiving	Josh Whyle	5 receptions, 61 yards, 1 TD
South Florida	Passing	Timmy McClain	16/30, 245 yards, 1 TD, 2 INT
South Florida	Rushing	Jaren Mangham	16 carries, 53 yards, 2 TD
South Florida	Receiving	Jimmy Horn Jr.	5 receptions, 108 yards, 1 TD

=== At Tulane ===
South Florida at Tulane

Team	1	2	Total
Bulls			0
Green Wave			0

- Date: November 20, 2021
- Location: Yulman Stadium
  New Orleans, LA
- Game start: 12:00 p.m. EST
- Elapsed time:
- Game attendance: 14,496
- Game weather: • Weather: TBD • Wind: TBD
- Referee:
- TV announcers (ESPN+): Jack Benjamin (play-by-play) and Brian Kinchen (analyst)

Scoring summary
1
2
3
4

Over/under

Statistics	South Florida	Tulane
First downs		
Total yards		
Rushing yards		
Passing yards		
Turnovers		
Time of possession		

Team	Category	Player	Statistics
South Florida	Passing		
South Florida	Rushing		
South Florida	Receiving		
Tulane	Passing		
Tulane	Rushing		
Tulane	Receiving		

=== At UCF ===
South Florida at UCF

Team	1	2	3	4	Total
Bulls	7	0	6	0	13
• Knights	7	7	0	3	17

- Date: November 26, 2021
- Location: FBC Mortgage Stadium
  Orlando, FL
- Game start: 3:30 p.m. EST
- Elapsed time:
- Game attendance: 41,157
- Game weather: • Weather: TBD • Wind: TBD
- Referee:
- TV announcers (ESPN): Roy Philpott (play-by-play), Kelly Stouffer (analyst), and Lauren Sisler (sideline)

Scoring summary
1
2
3
4

Over/under

Statistics	South Florida	UCF
First downs		
Total yards		
Rushing yards		
Passing yards		
Turnovers		
Time of possession		

Team	Category	Player	Statistics
South Florida	Passing		
South Florida	Rushing		
South Florida	Receiving		
UCF	Passing		
UCF	Rushing		
UCF	Receiving		
