= 2021 Houston Cougars football team =

American college football season

2021 Houston Cougars football

Birmingham Bowl champion

AAC Championship Game, L 20–35 vs. Cincinnati

Birmingham Bowl, W 17–13 vs. Auburn
- Conference: American Athletic Conference

Ranking
- Coaches: No. 17
- AP: No. 17
- Record: 12–2 (8–0 American)
- Head coach: Dana Holgorsen (3rd season)
- Offensive coordinator: Shannon Dawson (2nd season)
- Co-offensive coordinator: Brandon Jones (3rd season)
- Offensive scheme: Spread
- Defensive coordinator: Doug Belk (3rd season)
- Base defense: 4–2–5
- Home stadium: TDECU Stadium

2021 American Athletic Conference football standings
	Conf.			Overall
Team	W		L	W		L
No. 4 Cincinnati y$^	8	–	0	13	–	1
No. 17 Houston y	8	–	0	12	–	2
UCF	5	–	3	9	–	4
East Carolina	5	–	3	7	–	5
Tulsa	5	–	3	7	–	6
SMU	4	–	4	8	–	4
Memphis	3	–	5	6	–	6
Navy	3	–	5	4	–	8
Tulane	1	–	7	2	–	10
South Florida	1	–	7	2	–	10
Temple	1	–	7	3	–	9
Championship: Cincinnati 35, Houston 20
^ – College Football Playoff participant; $ – Conference champion; y – Championship game participant; Rankings from AP Poll

The 2021 Houston Cougars football team represented the University of Houston in the 2021 NCAA Division I FBS football season. The Cougars played their home games at TDECU Stadium in Houston, Texas, competing in the American Athletic Conference. They were led by third-year head coach Dana Holgorsen.

== Preseason ==
=== American Athletic Conference preseason media poll ===
The American Athletic Conference preseason media poll was released at the virtual media day held August 4, 2021. Cincinnati, who finished the 2020 season ranked No. 8 nationally, was tabbed as the preseason favorite in the 2021 preseason media poll.

Media poll
Predicted finish	Team	Votes (1st place)
1	Cincinnati	262 (22)
2	UCF	241 (2)
3	SMU	188
4	Houston	181
5	Memphis	168
6	Tulsa	153
7	Tulane	132
T-8	East Carolina	85
T-8	Navy	85
10	Temple	46
11	South Florida	43

== Schedule ==
Date	Time	Opponent	Rank	Site	TV	Result	Attendance
September 4	6:00 p.m.	vs. Texas Tech*		NRG Stadium; Houston, TX (Texas Kickoff / rivalry)	ESPN	L 21–38	43,478
September 11	5:30 p.m.	at Rice*		Rice Stadium; Houston, TX (rivalry)	CBSSN	W 44–7	26,253
September 18	6:00 p.m.	Grambling State*		TDECU Stadium; Houston, TX	ESPN+	W 45–0	22,998
September 25	6:00 p.m.	Navy		TDECU Stadium; Houston, TX	ESPNU	W 28–20	25,054
October 1	6:30 p.m.	at Tulsa		H.A. Chapman Stadium; Tulsa, OK	ESPN	W 45–10	15,890
October 7	6:30 p.m.	at Tulane		Yulman Stadium; New Orleans, LA	ESPN	W 40–22	15,026
October 23	8:20 p.m.	East Carolina^{†}		TDECU Stadium; Houston, TX	ESPNews ^{α}	W 31–24 ^{OT}	22,925
October 30	6:00 p.m.	No. 19 SMU		TDECU Stadium; Houston, TX (rivalry)	ESPN2	W 44–37	25,676
November 6	6:30 p.m.	at South Florida		Raymond James Stadium; Tampa, FL	ESPNU	W 54–42	28,667
November 13	11:00 a.m.	at Temple		Lincoln Financial Field; Philadelphia, PA	ESPN+	W 37–8	18,440
November 19	8:00 p.m.	Memphis	No. 24	TDECU Stadium; Houston, TX	ESPN2	W 31–13	28,712
November 27	11:00 a.m.	at UConn*	No. 24	Rentschler Field; East Hartford, CT	CBSSN	W 45–17	12,685
December 4	3:00 p.m.	at No. 4 Cincinnati	No. 21	Nippert Stadium; Cincinnati, OH (AAC Championship Game)	ABC	L 20–35	37,978
December 28	11:00 a.m.	vs. Auburn*	No. 20	Protective Stadium; Birmingham, AL (Birmingham Bowl)	ESPN	W 17–13	47,100
*Non-conference game; ^{†}Homecoming; Rankings from AP Poll (and CFP Rankings, after November 2) - Released prior to game; All times are in Central time

== Notes ==
^α This game was initially scheduled for ESPNU at 3:00 p.m. CT, but was moved to 8:20 p.m. CT on ESPNews because of a rain delay.

== Game summaries ==
=== Vs. Texas Tech (Texas Kickoff) ===
Texas Tech vs. Houston

Team	1	2	3	4	Total
• Red Raiders	0	7	17	14	38
Cougars	14	7	0	0	21

- Date: September 4, 2021
- Location: NRG Stadium
  Houston, TX
- Game start: 6:11 p.m. CDT
- Elapsed time: 3 hours and 35 minutes
- Game attendance: 43,478
- Game weather: 72 °F (22 °C) • Weather: Indoor (N/A)
- Referee: David Alvarez
- TV announcers (ESPN): Mark Jones (play–by–play), Robert Griffin III (analyst), and Quint Kessenich (sideline reporter)

Scoring summary
1	6:37	HOU	Clayton Tune 1-yard run (Dalton Witherspoon kick) (16 plays, 75 yards, 8:23)	HOU 7–0
1	2:13	HOU	Nathaniel Dell 23-yard pass from Clayton Tune (Dalton Witherspoon kick) (8 plays, 54 yards, 4:24)	HOU 14–0
2	11:47	TTU	Tahj Brooks 41-yard run (Jonathan Garibay kick) (1 play, 41 yards, 0:10)	HOU 14–7
2	0:23	HOU	Seth Green 9-yard pass from Clayton Tune (Dalton Witherspoon kick) (13 plays, 75 yards, 4:52)	HOU 21–7
3	8:08	TTU	Tyler Shough 8-yard run (Jonathan Garibay kick) (6 plays, 60 yards, 3:06)	HOU 21–14
3	7:20	TTU	Riko Jeffers 13-yard interception return (Jonathan Garibay kick) (2 plays, -7 yards, 0:48)	TIE 21–21
3	0:36	TTU	Jonathan Garibay 34-yard field goal (4 plays, 6 yards, 1:15)	TTU 24–21
4	2:05	TTU	Xavier White 3-yard pass from Tyler Shough (Jonathan Garibay kick) (8 plays, 71 yards, 2:52)	TTU 31–21
4	1:00	TTU	Tahj Brooks 44-yard run (Jonathan Garibay kick) (2 plays, 48 yards, 0:15)	TTU 38–21

Line	Over/under
HOU –2.5	63

Statistics	Texas Tech	Houston
First downs	15	15
Total yards	376	251
Rushing yards	145	77
Passing yards	231	174
Turnovers	1	4
Time of possession	23:23	36:37

Team	Category	Player	Statistics
Texas Tech	Passing	Tyler Shough	17/24, 231 yards, 1 TD
Texas Tech	Rushing	Tahj Brooks	15 rushes, 134 yards, 2 TDs
Texas Tech	Receiving	Erik Ezukanma	7 receptions, 179 yards
Houston	Passing	Clayton Tune	27/38, 174 yards, 2 TDs, 4 INTs
Houston	Rushing	Mulbah Car	13 rushes, 37 yards
Houston	Receiving	Nathaniel Dell	7 receptions, 80 yards, 1 TD

=== At Rice (Bayou Bucket Classic) ===
Houston at Rice

Team	1	2	3	4	Total
• Cougars	17	0	14	13	44
Owls	0	7	0	0	7

- Date: September 11, 2021
- Location: Rice Stadium
  Houston, TX
- Game start: 5:30 p.m. CDT
- Elapsed time:
- Game attendance: 26,253
- Game weather: • Weather: TBD • Wind: TBD
- Referee: Charles Lamertina
- TV announcers (CBSSN): Dave Ryan (play-by-play), Aaron Murray (analyst), and Desmond Purnell (sideline)

Scoring summary
1	10:08	HOU	Alton McCaskill 35-yard pass from Clayton Tune (Dalton Witherspoon kick) (8 plays, 84 yards, 3:30)	HOU 7–0
1	5:37	HOU	Dalton Witherspoon 38-yard field goal (7 plays, 56 yards, 3:18)	HOU 10–0
1	2:19	HOU	Jake Herslow 11-yard pass from Clayton Tune (Dalton Witherspoon kick) (6 plays, 48 yards, 2:37)	HOU 17–0
2	0:13	RICE	Jordan Myers 5-yard pass from Luke McCaffrey (Collin Riccitelli kick) (11 plays, 81 yards, 5:01)	HOU 17–7
3	7:18	HOU	Alton McCaskill 1-yard run (Dalton Witherspoon kick) (17 plays, 75 yards, 7:42)	HOU 24–7
3	0:01	HOU	Alton McCaskill 2-yard run (Dalton Witherspoon kick) (10 plays, 85 yards, 4:29)	HOU 31–7
4	4:51	HOU	Chandler Smith 14-yard run (Dalton Witherspoon kick) (2 plays, 20 yards, 0:49)	HOU 38–7
4	0:00	HOU	Alex Hogan 91-yard interception return (9 plays, 60 yards, 4:51)	HOU 44–7

Line	Over/under
HOU –7.5	51

Statistics	Houston	Rice
First downs	23	15
Total yards	393	212
Rushing yards	144	126
Passing yards	249	86
Turnovers	0	3
Time of possession	32:01	27:59

Team	Category	Player	Statistics
Houston	Passing	Clayton Tune	22/30, 236 yards, 2 TDs
Houston	Rushing	Clayton Tune	9 rushes, 49 yards
Houston	Receiving	Nathaniel Dell	7 receptions, 87 yards
Rice	Passing	Luke McCaffrey	9/19, 86 yards, 1 TD, 3 INTs
Rice	Rushing	Khalan Griffin	19 rushes, 86 yards
Rice	Receiving	Jorden Myers	5 receptions, 41 yards, 1 TD

=== Grambling State ===
Grambling State at Houston

Team	1	2	3	4	Total
Tigers	0	0	0	0	0
• Cougars	7	14	21	3	45

- Date: September 18, 2021
- Location: TDECU Stadium
  Houston, TX
- Game start: 6:06 p.m. CDT
- Elapsed time: 3 hours and 6 minutes
- Game attendance: 22,998
- Game weather: Sunny
- Referee: Nate Black
- TV announcers (ESPN+): Alex Del Barrio (play–by–play) and Stanford Routt (analyst)

Scoring summary
1	0:15	HOU	Nathaniel Dell 16-yard pass from Ike Ogbogu (Dalton Witherspoon kick) (6 plays, 47 yards, 2:06)	HOU 7–0
2	10:40	HOU	Marcus Jones 48-yard punt return (Dalton Witherspoon kick) (3 plays, 3 yards, 1:57)	HOU 14–0
2	5:23	HOU	Alton McCaskill 17-yard run (Dalton Witherspoon kick) (8 plays, 80 yards, 3:03)	HOU 21–0
3	11:54	HOU	Alton McCaskill 34-yard run (Dalton Witherspoon kick) (4 plays, 48 yards, 0:59)	HOU 28–0
3	7:01	HOU	Nathaniel Dell 10-yard pass from Ike Ogbogu (Dalton Witherspoon kick) (7 plays, 56 yards, 3:32)	HOU 35–0
3	2:03	HOU	Ta'Zhawn Henry 1-yard run (Dalton Witherspoon kick) (6 plays, 58 yards, 3:06)	HOU 42–0
4	6:10	HOU	Dalton Witherspoon 22-yard field goal (15 plays, 62 yards, 8:38)	HOU 45–0

Line	Over/under
HOU –41.0	52

Statistics	Grambling State	Houston
First downs	3	24
Total yards	102	422
Rushing yards	53	164
Passing yards	49	258
Turnovers	1	1
Time of possession	25:02	34:58

Team	Category	Player	Statistics
Grambling State	Passing	Aldon Clark	5/12, 49 yards
Grambling State	Rushing	Darqueze Brutton	9 rushes, 18 yards
Grambling State	Receiving	Greg White	1 reception, 37 yards
Houston	Passing	Ike Ogbogu	14/22, 196 yards, 2 TDs
Houston	Rushing	Alton McCaskill	16 rushes, 114 yards, 2 TDs
Houston	Receiving	Nathaniel Dell	8 receptions, 134 yards, 2 TDs

=== Navy ===
Navy at Houston

Team	1	2	3	4	Total
Midshipmen	7	10	0	3	20
• Cougars	7	0	7	14	28

- Date: September 25, 2021
- Location: TDECU Stadium
  Houston, TX
- Game start: 6:02 p.m. CDT
- Elapsed time: 3 hours and 8 minutes
- Game attendance: 25,054
- Game weather: 85 °F (29 °C) • Weather: Sunny • Wind: E 6 MPH
- Referee: Hank Johns
- TV announcers (ESPNU): Tiffany Greene (play-by-play) and Hutson Mason (analyst)

Scoring summary
1	13:57	NAVY	Xavier Arline 40-yard run (Bijan Nichols kick) (3 plays, 76 yards, 0:58)	NAVY 7–0
1	1:35	HOU	Marcus Jones 73-yard punt return (Dalton Witherspoon kick) (3 plays, 4 yards, 2:03)	TIE 7–7
2	7:53	NAVY	Bijan Nichols 30-yard field goal (15 plays, 62 yards, 8:42)	NAVY 10–7
2	0:52	NAVY	Isaac Ruoss 1-yard run (Bijan Nichols kick) (11 plays, 89 yards, 5:28)	NAVY 17–7
3	3:16	HOU	Ta'Zhawn Henry 2-yard run (Kyle Ramsey kick) (7 plays, 43 yards, 4:23)	NAVY 17–14
4	14:53	HOU	Marcus Jones 47-yard pass from Clayton Tune (Kyle Ramsey kick) (7 plays, 81 yards, 1:55)	HOU 21–17
4	12:08	HOU	Ta'Zhawn Henry 1-yard run (Kyle Ramsey kick) (5 plays, 26 yards, 2:39)	HOU 28–17
4	6:12	NAVY	Bijan Nichols 36-yard field goal (13 plays, 56 yards, 5:56)	HOU 28–20

Line	Over/under
HOU –20.0	47

Statistics	Navy	Houston
First downs	16	20
Total yards	300	384
Rushing yards	202	127
Passing yards	98	257
Turnovers	1	0
Time of possession	33:21	26:39

Team	Category	Player	Statistics
Navy	Passing	Xavier Arline	3/6, 83 yards
Navy	Rushing	Xavier Arline	19 rushes, 64 yards, 1 TD
Navy	Receiving	Mychal Cooper	3 receptions, 83 yards
Houston	Passing	Clayton Tune	22/30, 257 yards, 1 TD
Houston	Rushing	Alton McCaskill	17 rushes, 74 yards
Houston	Receiving	Christian Trahan	4 receptions, 65 yards

=== At Tulsa ===
Houston at Tulsa

Team	1	2	3	4	Total
• Cougars	14	14	7	10	45
Golden Hurricane	0	3	0	7	10

- Date: October 1, 2021
- Location: Skelly Field at H. A. Chapman Stadium
  Tulsa, OK
- Game start: 6:30 p.m. CDT
- Elapsed time: 3 hours and 32 minutes
- Game attendance: 15,890
- Game weather: 77 °F (25 °C) • Weather: Cloudy • Wind: W 2 MPH
- Referee: Luke Richmond
- TV announcers (ESPN): Roy Philpott (play-by-play), Andre Ware (analyst), and Paul Carcaterra (sideline)

Scoring summary
1	4:23	HOU	Alton McCaskill 1-yard run (Dalton Witherspoon kick) (8 plays, 81 yards, 4:29)	HOU 7–0
1	1:14	HOU	Jeremy Singleton 47-yard pass from Clayton Tune (Dalton Witherspoon kick) (4 plays, 85 yards, 1:21)	HOU 14–0
2	13:01	HOU	Alton McCaskill 27-yard run (Dalton Witherspoon kick) (3 plays, 56 yards, 1:10)	HOU 21–0
2	9:33	HOU	Alton McCaskill 1-yard run (Dalton Witherspoon kick) (5 plays, 32 yards, 2:01)	HOU 28–0
2	1:22	TLSA	Zack Long 33-yard field goal (11 plays, 65 yards, 2:58)	HOU 28–3
3	14:06	HOU	Gervarrius Owens 45-yard interception return (Dalton Witherspoon kick) (3 plays, 10 yards, 0:54)	HOU 35–3
4	14:55	HOU	Seth Green 8-yard pass from Clayton Tune (Dalton Witherspoon kick) (9 plays, 57 yards, 4:32)	HOU 42–3
4	9:26	TLSA	Ezra Naylor II 41-yard pass from Davis Brin (Zack Long kick) (6 plays, 72 yards, 1:46)	HOU 42–10
4	4:19	HOU	Dalton Witherspoon 48-yard field goal (9 plays, 44 yards, 5:07)	HOU 45–10

Line	Over/under
TLSA –3.5	54

Statistics	Houston	Tulsa
First downs	22	14
Total yards	405	289
Rushing yards	144	31
Passing yards	261	258
Turnovers	1	3
Time of possession	32:26	27:34

Team	Category	Player	Statistics
Houston	Passing	Clayton Tune	17/24, 241 yards, 2 TDs, 1 INT
Houston	Rushing	Alton McCaskill	17 rushes, 77 yards, 3 TDs
Houston	Receiving	Nathaniel Dell	6 receptions, 82 yards
Tulsa	Passing	Davis Brin	20/39, 258 yards, 1 TD, 3 INTs
Tulsa	Rushing	Anthony Watkins	8 rushes, 39 yards
Tulsa	Receiving	Sam Crawford Jr.	5 receptions, 101 yards

=== At Tulane ===
Houston at Tulane

Team	1	2	3	4	Total
• Cougars	14	3	9	14	40
Green Wave	0	15	7	0	22

- Date: October 7, 2021
- Location: Yulman Stadium
  New Orleans, LA
- Game start: 6:30 p.m. CDT
- Elapsed time: 3 hours and 19 minutes
- Game attendance: 15,026
- Game weather: 83 °F (28 °C) • Weather: Mostly Sunny • Wind: NE 4 MPH
- Referee: Tim Rich
- TV announcers (ESPN): Matt Barrie (play-by-play), Roddy Jones (analyst), and Harry Lyles, Jr. (sideline)

Scoring summary
1	8:04	HOU	Christian Trahan 11-yard pass from Clayton Tune (Dalton Witherspoon kick) (11 plays, 76 yards, 5:14)	HOU 7–0
1	0:22	HOU	Jeremy Singleton 17-yard pass from Clayton Tune (Dalton Witherspoon kick) (7 plays, 64 yards, 2:58)	HOU 14–0
2	10:45	TULN	Tyrick James 13-yard pass from Michael Pratt (Christian Daniels Pass to Michael Pratt for two-point conversion) (5 plays, 73 yards, 1:53)	HOU 14–8
2	3:33	HOU	Dalton Witherspoon 46-yard field goal (7 plays, 20 yards, 2:26)	HOU 17–8
2	2:11	TULN	Tyjae Spears 39-yard run (Merek Glover kick) (6 plays, 75 yards, 1:22)	HOU 17–15
3	13:18	TULN	Will Wallace 29-yard pass from Michael Pratt (Merek Glover kick) (1 play, 29 yards, 0:08)	TULN 22–17
3	8:16	HOU	Dalton Witherspoon 24-yard field goal (5 plays, 28 yards, 1:17)	TULN 22–20
3	1:20	HOU	Jeremy Singleton 29-yard pass from Clayton Tune (Two-point pass conversion failed) (11 plays, 80 yards, 4:40)	HOU 26–22
4	9:28	HOU	Ta'Zhawn Henry 8-yard run (Dalton Witherspoon kick) (6 plays, 39 yards, 3:20)	HOU 33–22
4	1:03	HOU	Alton McCaskill 35-yard run (Dalton Witherspoon kick) (6 plays, 53 yards, 1:59)	HOU 40–22

Line	Over/under
HOU –6.5	60

Statistics	Houston	Tulane
First downs	18	17
Total yards	435	308
Rushing yards	147	94
Passing yards	288	214
Turnovers	0	1
Time of possession	31:34	28:26

Team	Category	Player	Statistics
Houston	Passing	Clayton Tune	23/36, 288 yards, 3 TDs
Houston	Rushing	Alton McCaskill	18 rushes, 93 yards, 1 TD
Houston	Receiving	KeSean Carter	6 receptions, 69 yards
Tulane	Passing	Michael Pratt	20/30, 214 yards, 2 TDs
Tulane	Rushing	Cameron Carroll	13 rushes, 68 yards
Tulane	Receiving	Will Wallace	2 receptions, 54 yards, 1 TD

=== East Carolina ===
East Carolina at Houston

Team	1	2	3	4	OT	Total
Pirates	10	0	0	14	0	24
• Cougars	17	7	0	0	7	31

- Date: October 23, 2021
- Location: TDECU Stadium
  Houston, TX
- Game start: 3:00 p.m. CDT (Kicked at 8:20 p.m. – delayed 5 hours and 20 minutes to kickoff due to lightning)
- Elapsed time: 3 hours and 27 minutes
- Game attendance: 22,925
- Game weather: 71 °F (22 °C) • Weather: Cloudy • Wind: SE 9 MPH
- Referee: Edwin Lee
- TV announcers (ESPNews): Kevin Brown (play-by-play) and Hutson Mason (analyst)

Scoring summary
1	11:39	ECU	Owen Daffer 33-yard field goal (9 plays, 60 yards, 3:21)	ECU 3–0
1	6:56	HOU	Dalton Witherspoon 21-yard field goal (11 plays, 70 yards, 4:43)	TIE 3–3
1	5:46	ECU	Jsi Hatfield 40-yard pass from Holton Ahlers (Owen Daffer kick) (3 plays, 78 yards, 1:10)	ECU 10–3
1	5:34	HOU	Marcus Jones 98-yard kickoff return (Dalton Witherspoon kick) (0 plays, 0 yards, 0:12)	TIE 10–10
1	1:38	HOU	Christian Trahan 2-yard pass from Clayton Tune (Dalton Witherspoon kick) (5 plays, 32 yards, 2:47)	HOU 17–10
2	3:12	HOU	Nathaniel Dell 14-yard pass from Clayton Tune (Dalton Witherspoon kick) (2 plays, 13 yards, 0:22)	HOU 24–10
4	6:59	ECU	Holton Ahlers 1-yard run (Owen Daffer kick) (6 plays, 71 yards, 2:40)	HOU 24–17
4	5:43	ECU	Audie Omotosho 13-yard pass from Holton Ahlers (Owen Daffer kick) (2 plays, 16 yards, 1:01)	TIE 24–24
OT		HOU	Alton McCaskill 25-yard run (Dalton Witherspoon kick) (1 play, 25 yards)	HOU 31–24

Line	Over/under
HOU –13.5	57

Statistics	East Carolina	Houston
First downs	20	16
Total yards	360	256
Rushing yards	82	87
Passing yards	278	169
Turnovers	3	1
Time of possession	29:13	30:47

Team	Category	Player	Statistics
East Carolina	Passing	Holton Ahlers	23/37, 278 yards, 2 TDs
East Carolina	Rushing	Keaton Mitchell	11 rushes, 38 yards
East Carolina	Receiving	Tyler Snead	7 receptions, 114 yards
Houston	Passing	Clayton Tune	19/29, 169 yards, 2 TDs
Houston	Rushing	Alton McCaskill	12 rushes, 60 yards, 1 TD
Houston	Receiving	Christian Trahan	6 receptions, 68 yards, 1 TD

=== No. 19 SMU ===
SMU at Houston

Team	1	2	3	4	Total
No. 19 Mustangs	7	13	14	3	37
• Cougars	17	6	7	14	44

- Date: October 30, 2021
- Location: TDECU Stadium
  Houston, TX
- Game start: 6:00 p.m. CDT
- Elapsed time: 3 hours and 37 minutes
- Game attendance: 25,676
- Game weather: Temperature: 74 °F (23 °C) • Weather: Sunny • Wind: NW 6 MPH
- Referee: Charles Lamertina
- TV announcers (ESPN2): Taylor Zarzour (play-by-play), Matt Stinchcomb (analyst), and Alyssa Lang (sideline)

Scoring summary
1	11:20	HOU	Nathaniel Dell 7-yard pass from Clayton Tune (Dalton Witherspoon kick) (9 plays, 78 yards, 3:40)	HOU 7–0
1	9:26	HOU	Nathaniel Dell 48-yard pass from Clayton Tune (Dalton Witherspoon kick) (2 plays, 56 yards, 0:33)	HOU 14–0
1	2:20	HOU	Dalton Witherspoon 50-yard field goal (9 plays, 55 yards, 4:32)	HOU 17–0
1	0:00	SMU	Jordan Kerley 43-yard pass from Tanner Mordecai (Blake Mazza kick) (7 plays, 75 yards, 2:20	HOU 17–7
2	11:41	HOU	Dalton Witherspoon 23-yard field goal (7 plays, 69 yards, 3:19)	HOU 20–7
2	7:28	SMU	Tre Siggers 50-yard pass from Tanner Mordecai (Blake Mazza kick) (1 play, 50 yards, 0:09)	HOU 20–14
2	2:45	SMU	Rashee Rice 6-yard pass from Tanner Mordecai (Blake Mazza PAT blocked) (7 plays, 35 yards, 3:07)	TIE 20–20
2	0:00	HOU	Dalton Witherspoon 30-yard field goal (12 plays, 62 yards, 2:45)	HOU 23–20
3	14:45	SMU	Bryan Massey 100-yard kickoff return (Blake Mazza kick) (0 plays, 0 yards, 0:15)	SMU 27–23
3	9:22	HOU	Nathaniel Dell 17-yard pass from Clayton Tune (Dalton Witherspoon kick) (11 plays, 72 yards, 5:23)	HOU 30–27
3	5:46	SMU	Tre Siggers 2-yard run (Blake Mazza kick) (8 plays, 75 yards, 3:36)	SMU 34–30
4	13:36	HOU	KeSean Carter 4-yard pass from Clayton Tune (Dalton Witherspoon kick) (14 plays, 75 yards, 7:10)	HOU 37–34
4	0:30	SMU	Blake Mazza 45-yard field goal (10 plays, 58 yards, 1:34)	TIE 37–37
4	0:17	HOU	Marcus Jones 100-yard kickoff return (Dalton Witherspoon kick) (0 plays, 0 yards, 0:13)	HOU 44–37

Line	Over/under
SMU –1.0	62

Statistics	SMU	Houston
First downs	18	23
Total yards	355	489
Rushing yards	50	77
Passing yards	305	412
Turnovers	1	1
Time of possession	24:37	35:23

Team	Category	Player	Statistics
SMU	Passing	Tanner Mordecai	24/37, 305 yards, 3 TDs, 1 INT
SMU	Rushing	Tre Siggers	13 rushes, 44 yards, 1 TD
SMU	Receiving	Danny Gray	5 receptions, 73 yards
Houston	Passing	Clayton Tune	27/37, 412 yards, 4 TDs
Houston	Rushing	Ta'Zhawn Henry	21 rushes, 49 yards
Houston	Receiving	Nathaniel Dell	9 receptions, 165 yards, 3 TDs

=== At South Florida ===
Houston at South Florida

Team	1	2	3	4	Total
• Cougars	9	17	21	7	54
Bulls	14	14	7	7	42

- Date: November 6, 2021
- Location: Raymond James Stadium
  Tampa, FL
- Game start: 6:30 p.m. CDT
- Elapsed time:
- Game attendance: 28,667
- Game weather: • Weather: TBD • Wind: TBD
- Referee: Tim Rich
- TV announcers (ESPNU): Mike Couzens (play-by-play) and Dustin Fox (analyst)

Scoring summary
1	14:47	USF	Brian Battie 100-yard kickoff return (Spencer Shrader kick) (0 plays, 0 yards, 0:13)	USF 7–0
1	8:35	HOU	Jake Herslow 18-yard pass from Clayton Tune (Dalton Witherspoon kick) (7 plays, 56 yards, 2:51)	TIE 7–7
1	6:44	USF	Brian Battie 29-yard run (Spencer Shrader kick) (5 plays, 75 yards, 1:51)	USF 14–7
1	3:34	HOU	Atlias Bell safety (3 plays, -1 yard, 0:44)	USF 14–9
2	14:52	HOU	Dalton Witherspoon 19-yard field goal (8 plays, 56 yards, 3:42)	USF 14–12
2	10:19	USF	Mitchell Brinkman 33-yard pass from Timmy McClain (Spencer Shrader kick) (10 plays, 75 yards, 4:33)	USF 21–12
2	8:19	HOU	Alton McCaskill 6-yard run (Dalton Witherspoon kick) (5 plays, 54 yards, 2:00)	USF 21–19
2	2:30	HOU	Nathaniel Dell 55-yard pass from Clayton Tune (Dalton Witherspoon kick) (3 plays, 87 yards, 0:40)	HOU 26–21
2	2:16	USF	Brian Battie 100-yard kickoff return (Spencer Shrader kick) (0 plays, 0 yards, 0:14)	USF 28–26
3	12:50	HOU	Alton McCaskill 2-yard run (Dalton Witherspoon kick) (5 plays, 67 yards, 2:10)	HOU 33–28
3	10:04	HOU	Ta'Zhawn Henry 97-yard run (Dalton Witherspoon kick) (1 play, 97 yards, 0:14)	HOU 40–28
3	6:58	USF	Chris Carter 14-yard pass from Timmy McClain (Spencer Shrader kick) (11 plays, 65 yards, 3:06)	HOU 40–35
3	4:44	HOU	Jeremy Singleton 27-yard pass from Clayton Tune (Dalton Witherspoon kick) (5 plays, 75 yards, 2:14)	HOU 47–35
4	3:59	USF	Timmy McClain 11-yard run (Spencer Shrader kick) (9 plays, 60 yards, 2:34)	HOU 47–42
4	2:27	HOU	Alton McCaskill 16-yard run (Dalton Witherspoon kick) (3 plays, 44 yards, 1:32)	HOU 54–42

Line	Over/under
HOU –13.5	53

Statistics	Houston	South Florida
First downs	30	23
Total yards	646	399
Rushing yards	261	110
Passing yards	385	289
Turnovers	0	2
Time of possession	33:07	26:53

Team	Category	Player	Statistics
Houston	Passing	Clayton Tune	21/26, 385 yards, 3 TDs
Houston	Rushing	Ta'Zhawn Henry	10 rushes, 130 yards, 1 TD
Houston	Receiving	Nathaniel Dell	8 receptions, 164 yards, 1 TD
South Florida	Passing	Timmy McClain	22/46, 289 yards, 2 TDs, 2 INTs
South Florida	Rushing	Timmy McClain	11 rushes, 46 yards, 1 TD
South Florida	Receiving	Xavier Weaver	6 receptions, 105 yards

=== At Temple ===
Houston at Temple

Team	1	2	3	4	Total
• Cougars	7	3	14	13	37
Owls	0	0	0	8	8

- Date: November 13, 2021
- Location: Lincoln Financial Field
  Philadelphia, PA
- Game start: 11:00 a.m. CST
- Elapsed time: 3 hours and 16 minutes
- Game attendance: 18,440
- Game weather: 82 °F (28 °C) • Weather: Cloudy • Wind: S 13 MPH
- Referee: Edwin Lee
- TV announcers (ESPN+): Courtney Lyle (play-by-play) and Leger Douzable (analyst)

Scoring summary
1	8:47	HOU	Alton McCaskill 3-yard run (Dalton Witherspoon kick) (7 plays, 47 yards, 3:30)	HOU 7–0
2	7:46	HOU	Dalton Witherspoon 39-yard field goal (13 plays, 58 yards, 7:09)	HOU 10–0
3	11:29	HOU	Ta'Zhawn Henry 6-yard run (Dalton Witherspoon kick) (8 plays, 65 yards, 3:31)	HOU 17–0
3	4:00	HOU	Alton McCaskill 34-yard run (Dalton Witherspoon kick) (5 plays, 52 yards, 2:05)	HOU 24–0
4	14:22	TEM	Edward Saydee 1-yard run (Justin Lynch pass to Darius Pittman for two-point conversion) (4 plays, 45 yards, 0:56)	HOU 24–8
4	10:57	HOU	Jaylen Erwin 35-yard pass from Clayton Tune (Dalton Witherspoon PAT blocked) (7 plays, 77 yards, 3:23)	HOU 30–8
4	6:13	HOU	Seth Green 6-yard pass from Clayton Tune (Dalton Witherspoon kick) (6 plays, 42 yards, 2:28)	HOU 37–8

Line	Over/under
HOU –25.0	53

Statistics	Houston	Temple
First downs	24	10
Total yards	446	218
Rushing yards	217	99
Passing yards	229	119
Turnovers	0	3
Time of possession	39:22	20:38

Team	Category	Player	Statistics
Houston	Passing	Clayton Tune	21/34, 224 yards, 2 TDs
Houston	Rushing	Alton McCaskill	21 rushes, 129 yards, 2 TDs
Houston	Receiving	Seth Green	7 receptions, 74 yards, 1 TD
Temple	Passing	Justin Lynch	11/24, 119 yards, 2 INTs
Temple	Rushing	Justin Lynch	14 rushes, 78 yards
Temple	Receiving	Randle Jones	5 receptions, 36 yards

=== Memphis ===
Memphis at Houston

Team	1	2	3	4	Total
Tigers	0	3	7	3	13
• No. 24 Cougars	0	21	0	10	31

- Date: November 19, 2021
- Location: TDECU Stadium
  Houston, TX
- Game start: 8:00 p.m. CST
- Elapsed time: 3 hours and 40 minutes
- Game attendance: 28,712
- Game weather: • Weather: Cloudy • Wind: SE 4 MPH
- Referee: Hank Johns
- TV announcers (ESPN2): Jason Benetti (play-by-play), Andre Ware (analyst), and Paul Carcaterra (sideline)

Scoring summary
2	14:03	HOU	Alton McCaskill 36-yard run (Dalton Witherspoon kick) (1 play, 36 yards, 0:15)	HOU 7–0
2	5:40	HOU	Nathaniel Dell 19-yard pass from Clayton Tune (Dalton Witherspoon kick) (11 plays, 93 yards, 4:36)	HOU 14–0
2	2:55	MEM	David Kemp 28-yard field goal (9 plays, 65 yards, 2:45)	HOU 14–3
2	0:53	HOU	Clayton Tune 20-yard run (Dalton Witherspoon kick) (6 plays, 63 yards, 2:02)	HOU 21–3
3	4:31	MEM	Asa Martin 5-yard pass from Seth Henigan (David Kemp kick) (11 plays, 60 yards, 4:16)	HOU 21–10
4	14:52	MEM	David Kemp 22-yard field goal (8 plays, 86 yards, 2:30)	HOU 21–13
4	3:24	HOU	Dalton Witherspoon 34-yard field goal (5 plays, 29 yards, 2:15)	HOU 24–13
4	1:43	HOU	Ta'Zhawn Henry 4-yard run (Dalton Witherspoon kick) (3 plays, 18 yards, 0:52)	HOU 31–13

Line	Over/under
HOU –9.5	59

Statistics	Memphis	Houston
First downs	24	25
Total yards	322	461
Rushing yards	106	197
Passing yards	216	264
Turnovers	2	2
Time of possession	25:34	34:26

Team	Category	Player	Statistics
Memphis	Passing	Seth Henigan	21/45, 208 yards, 1 TD, 2 INTs
Memphis	Rushing	Rodrigues Clark	12 rushes, 32 yards
Memphis	Receiving	Calvin Austin	5 receptions, 103 yards
Houston	Passing	Clayton Tune	20/34, 264 yards, 1 TD, 2 INTs
Houston	Rushing	Ta'Zhawn Henry	13 rushes, 73 yards, 1 TD
Houston	Receiving	Nathaniel Dell	7 receptions, 100 yards, 1 TD

=== At UConn ===
Houston at UConn

Team	1	2	3	4	Total
• No. 24 Cougars	7	14	17	7	45
Huskies	0	10	0	7	17

- Date: November 27, 2021
- Location: Pratt & Whitney Stadium at Rentschler Field
  East Hartford, CT
- Game start: 11:00 a.m. CST
- Elapsed time: 3 hours and 23 minutes
- Game attendance: 12,685
- Game weather: 39 °F (4 °C) • Weather: Sunny • Wind: TBD
- Referee: Tom O'Mara
- TV announcers (CBSSN): Jason Knapp (play-by-play), Ross Tucker (analyst), and Tina Cervasio (sideline)

Scoring summary
1	10:21	HOU	Alton McCaskill 31-yard run (Dalton Witherspoon kick) (6 plays, 55 yards, 3:02)	HOU 7–0
2	11:44	HOU	Jake Herslow 49-yard pass from Clayton Tune (Dalton Witherspoon kick) (3 plays, 52 yards, 0:50)	HOU 14–0
2	6:31	UCONN	Kevens Clercius 34-yard pass from Steven Krajewski (Joe McFadden kick) (3 plays, 25 yards, 1:09)	HOU 14–7
2	1:15	HOU	Nathaniel Dell 6-yard pass from Clayton Tune (Dalton Witherspoon kick) (3 plays, 52 yards, 0:50)	HOU 21–7
2	0:01	UCONN	Joe McFadden 25-yard field goal (7 plays, 52 yards, 1:11)	HOU 21–10
3	11:08	HOU	Nathaniel Dell 13-yard pass from Clayton Tune (Dalton Witherspoon kick) (9 plays, 47 yards, 3:45)	HOU 28–10
3	6:02	HOU	Dalton Witherspoon 23-yard field goal (7 plays, 61 yards, 3:36)	HOU 31–10
3	1:26	HOU	Jeremy Singleton 34-yard pass from Clayton Tune (Dalton Witherspoon kick) (3 plays, 55 yards, 1:18)	HOU 38–10
4	11:30	UCONN	Malik Dixon 37-yard interception return (Joe McFadden kick) (2 plays, 12 yards, 0:46)	HOU 38–17
4	3:03	HOU	Chandler Smith 1-yard run (Dalton Witherspoon kick) (4 plays, 27 yards, 1:50)	HOU 45–17

Line	Over/under
HOU –32.0	54.5

Statistics	Houston	UConn
First downs	21	16
Total yards	472	238
Rushing yards	149	82
Passing yards	323	156
Turnovers	1	1
Time of possession	31:16	28:44

Team	Category	Player	Statistics
Houston	Passing	Clayton Tune	21/30, 301 yards, 4 TDs
Houston	Rushing	Alton McCaskill	9 rushes, 54 yards, 1 TD
Houston	Receiving	Jake Herslow	5 receptions, 111 yards, 1 TD
UConn	Passing	Steven Krajewski	9/19, 79 yards, 1 TD
UConn	Rushing	Steven Krajewski	8 rushes, 53 yards
UConn	Receiving	Kevens Clercius	2 receptions, 64 yards, 1 TD

=== At No. 4 Cincinnati (AAC Championship game) ===
2021 American Athletic Conference Football Championship Game

Team	1	2	3	4	Total
No. 21 Cougars	10	3	0	7	20
• No. 4 Bearcats	14	0	21	0	35

- Date: December 4, 2021
- Location: Nippert Stadium
  Cincinnati, OH
- Game start: 3:00 p.m. CST
- Elapsed time: 3 hours and 21 minutes
- Game attendance: 37,978
- Game weather: 52 °F (11 °C) • Weather: Sunny • Wind: N 6 MPH
- Referee: Hank Johns
- TV announcers (ABC): Joe Tessitore (play-by-play), Greg McElroy (analyst), and Katie George (sideline)

Scoring summary
1	11:55	HOU	Dalton Witherspoon 37-yard field goal (7 plays, 50 yards, 2:57)	HOU 3–0
1	9:38	CIN	Tyler Scott 25-yard pass from Desmond Ridder (Christian Lowery kick) (5 plays, 82 yards, 2:11)	CIN 7–3
1	4:23	HOU	Nathaniel Dell 16-yard pass from Clayton Tune (Dalton Witherspoon kick) (10 plays, 74 yards, 5:07)	HOU 10–7
1	4:06	CIN	Jerome Ford 79-yard run (Christian Lowery kick) (1 play, 79 yards, 0:11)	CIN 14–10
2	11:40	HOU	Dalton Witherspoon 46-yard field goal (13 plays, 44 yards, 7:21)	CIN 14–13
3	12:02	CIN	Leonard Taylor 8-yard pass from Desmond Ridder (6 plays, 75 yards, 2:58)	CIN 21–13
3	11:04	CIN	Alec Pierce 21-yard pass from Desmond Ridder (Christian Lowery kick) (2 plays, 23 yards, 0:41)	CIN 28–13
3	7:38	CIN	Jerome Ford 42-yard run (Christian Lowery kick) (3 plays, 62 yards, 1:18)	CIN 35–13
4	6:06	HOU	Jake Herslow 7-yard pass from Clayton Tune (Dalton Witherspoon kick) (13 plays, 90 yards, 7:28)	CIN 35–20

Line	Over/under
CIN –10.5	52.5

Statistics	Houston	Cincinnati
First downs	22	14
Total yards	336	400
Rushing yards	86	210
Passing yards	250	190
Turnovers	1	0
Time of possession	40:19	19:41

Team	Category	Player	Statistics
Houston	Passing	Clayton Tune	17/26, 250 yards, 2 TDs, 1 INT
Houston	Rushing	Alton McCaskill	13 rushes, 39 yards
Houston	Receiving	Nathaniel Dell	9 receptions, 152 yards, 1 TD
Cincinnati	Passing	Desmond Ridder	11/17, 190 yards, 3 TDs
Cincinnati	Rushing	Jerome Ford	18 rushes, 187 yards, 2 TDs
Cincinnati	Receiving	Alec Pierce	2 receptions, 65 yards, 1 TD

=== Vs. Auburn (Birmingham Bowl) ===
2021 Birmingham Bowl

Team	1	2	3	4	Total
• No. 20 Cougars	7	3	0	7	17
Tigers	0	3	10	0	13

- Date: December 28, 2021
- Location: Protective Stadium
  Birmingham, AL
- Game start: 11:00 a.m. CST
- Elapsed time: 3 hours and 25 minutes
- Game attendance: 47,100
- Game weather: 65 °F (18 °C) • Weather: Sunny • Wind:
- Referee: Michael Mothershed
- TV announcers (ESPN): Taylor Zarzour (play-by-play), Eric Mac Lain (analyst), and Taylor Davis (sideline)

Scoring summary
1	8:46	HOU	Alton McCaskill 5-yard pass from Clayton Tune (Dalton Witherspoon kick) (12 plays, 87 yards, 6:14)	HOU 7–0
2	6:58	HOU	Dalton Witherspoon 52-yard field goal (9 plays, 45 yards, 4:10)	HOU 10–0
2	3:10	AUB	Ben Patton 27-yard field goal (8 plays, 67 yards, 3:48)	HOU 10–3
3	12:12	AUB	Ben Patton 35-yard field goal (7 plays, 57 yards, 2:48)	HOU 10–6
3	3:52	AUB	Kobe Hudson 12-yard pass from T. J. Finley (Ben Patton kick) (11 plays, 78 yards, 6:20)	AUB 13–10
4	3:27	HOU	Jake Herslow 26-yard pass from Clayton Tune (Dalton Witherspoon kick) (8 plays, 80 yards, 3:20)	HOU 17–13

Line	Over/under
AUB –2.0	49

Statistics	Houston	Auburn
First downs	19	15
Total yards	398	352
Rushing yards	115	125
Passing yards	283	227
Turnovers	2	0
Time of possession	29:50	30:10

Team	Category	Player	Statistics
Houston	Passing	Clayton Tune	26/40, 283 yards, 2 TDs, 1 INT
Houston	Rushing	Alton McCaskill	14 rushes, 78 yards
Houston	Receiving	Nathaniel Dell	10 receptions, 150 yards
Auburn	Passing	T. J. Finley	19/37, 227 yards, 1 TD
Auburn	Rushing	Tank Bigsby	16 rushes, 96 yards
Auburn	Receiving	Tank Bigsby	5 receptions, 68 yards

== Rankings ==
Ranking movements Legend: ██ Increase in ranking ██ Decrease in ranking — = Not ranked RV = Received votes
	Week															
Poll	Pre	1	2	3	4	5	6	7	8	9	10	11	12	13	14	Final
AP	RV	—	—	—	—	—	—	RV	RV	20	17	17	19	16	21	17
Coaches	RV	—	—	—	—	—	RV	RV	RV	19	17	17	16	16	21	17
CFP	Not released									—	—	24	24	21	20	Not released
