= 2021 Tulsa Golden Hurricane football team =

American college football season

2021 Tulsa Golden Hurricane football

Myrtle Beach Bowl champion

Myrtle Beach Bowl, W 30–17 vs. Old Dominion
- Conference: American Athletic Conference
- Record: 7–6 (5–3 AAC)
- Head coach: Philip Montgomery (7th season)
- Offensive scheme: Veer and shoot
- Defensive coordinator: Joe Gillespie (3rd season)
- Base defense: 3–3–5
- Home stadium: Skelly Field at H. A. Chapman Stadium

2021 American Athletic Conference football standings
| | Conf. | | | Overall |
| Team | W | | L | W | | L |
|---|---|---|---|---|---|---|
| No. 4 Cincinnati y$^ | 8 | – | 0 | 13 | – | 1 |
| No. 17 Houston y | 8 | – | 0 | 12 | – | 2 |
| UCF | 5 | – | 3 | 9 | – | 4 |
| East Carolina | 5 | – | 3 | 7 | – | 5 |
| Tulsa | 5 | – | 3 | 7 | – | 6 |
| SMU | 4 | – | 4 | 8 | – | 4 |
| Memphis | 3 | – | 5 | 6 | – | 6 |
| Navy | 3 | – | 5 | 4 | – | 8 |
| Tulane | 1 | – | 7 | 2 | – | 10 |
| South Florida | 1 | – | 7 | 2 | – | 10 |
| Temple | 1 | – | 7 | 3 | – | 9 |
Championship: Cincinnati 35, Houston 20
^ – College Football Playoff participant; $ – Conference champion; y – Championship game participant; Rankings from AP Poll

The 2021 Tulsa Golden Hurricane football team represented the University of Tulsa as a member of the American Athletic Conference during the 2021 NCAA Division I FBS football season. Led by seventh-year head coach Philip Montgomery, the Golden Hurricane compiled an overall record of 7–6 with a mark of 5–3 in conference play, placing in a three-way tie for third in the American. Tulsa was invited to the Myrtle Beach Bowl, where they beat Old Dominion. The team played home games at Skelly Field at H. A. Chapman Stadium in Tulsa, Oklahoma.

== Preseason ==
=== American Athletic Conference preseason media poll ===
The American Athletic Conference preseason media poll was released at the virtual media day held August 4, 2021. Tulsa was ranked sixth in the preseason poll.

== Schedule ==
Tulsa opened the 2021 season at home against UC Davis on Thursday, September 2, before a pair of road games at Oklahoma State, September 11 in Stillwater and Ohio State, September 18 in Columbus.

| Date | Time | Opponent | Site | TV | Result | Attendance |
|---|---|---|---|---|---|---|
| September 2 | 6:30 p.m. | No. 23 (FCS) UC Davis* | Skelly Field at H. A. Chapman Stadium; Tulsa, OK | ESPN+ | L 17–19 | 15,085 |
| September 11 | 11:00 a.m. | at Oklahoma State* | Boone Pickens Stadium; Stillwater, OK (rivalry) | FS1 | L 23–28 | 52,127 |
| September 18 | 2:30 p.m. | at No. 9 Ohio State* | Ohio Stadium; Columbus, OH | FS1 | L 20–41 | 76,540 |
| September 25 | 4:00 p.m. | Arkansas State* | Skelly Field at H. A. Chapman Stadium; Tulsa, OK | ESPN+ | W 41–34 | 14,881 |
| October 1 | 6:30 p.m. | Houston | Skelly Field at H. A. Chapman Stadium; Tulsa, OK | ESPN | L 10–45 | 15,890 |
| October 9 | 8:00 p.m. | Memphis | Skelly Field at H. A. Chapman Stadium; Tulsa, OK | ESPN2 | W 35–29 | 17,593 |
| October 16 | 11:00 a.m. | at South Florida | Raymond James Stadium; Tampa, FL | ESPNU | W 32–31 | 21,767 |
| October 29 | 6:30 p.m. | Navy | Skelly Field at H. A. Chapman Stadium; Tulsa, OK | ESPN2 | L 17–20 | 16,279 |
| November 6 | 2:30 p.m. | at No. 6 Cincinnati | Nippert Stadium; Cincinnati, OH (College GameDay) | ESPN2 | L 20–28 | 37,978 |
| November 13 | 3:00 p.m. | at Tulane | Yulman Stadium; New Orleans, LA | ESPNU | W 20–13 ^{OT} | 22,784 |
| November 20 | 3:00 p.m. | Temple | Skelly Field at H. A. Chapman Stadium; Tulsa, OK | ESPN+ | W 44–10 | 16,731 |
| November 27 | 3:00 p.m. | at SMU | Gerald J. Ford Stadium; University Park, TX | ESPN2 | W 34–31 | 17,158 |
| December 20 | 2:30 p.m. | vs. Old Dominion* | Brooks Stadium; Conway, SC (Myrtle Beach Bowl) | ESPN | W 30–17 | 6,557 |
*Non-conference game; Rankings from AP Poll and CFP Rankings after November 2 released prior to game; All times are in Central time

== Rankings ==
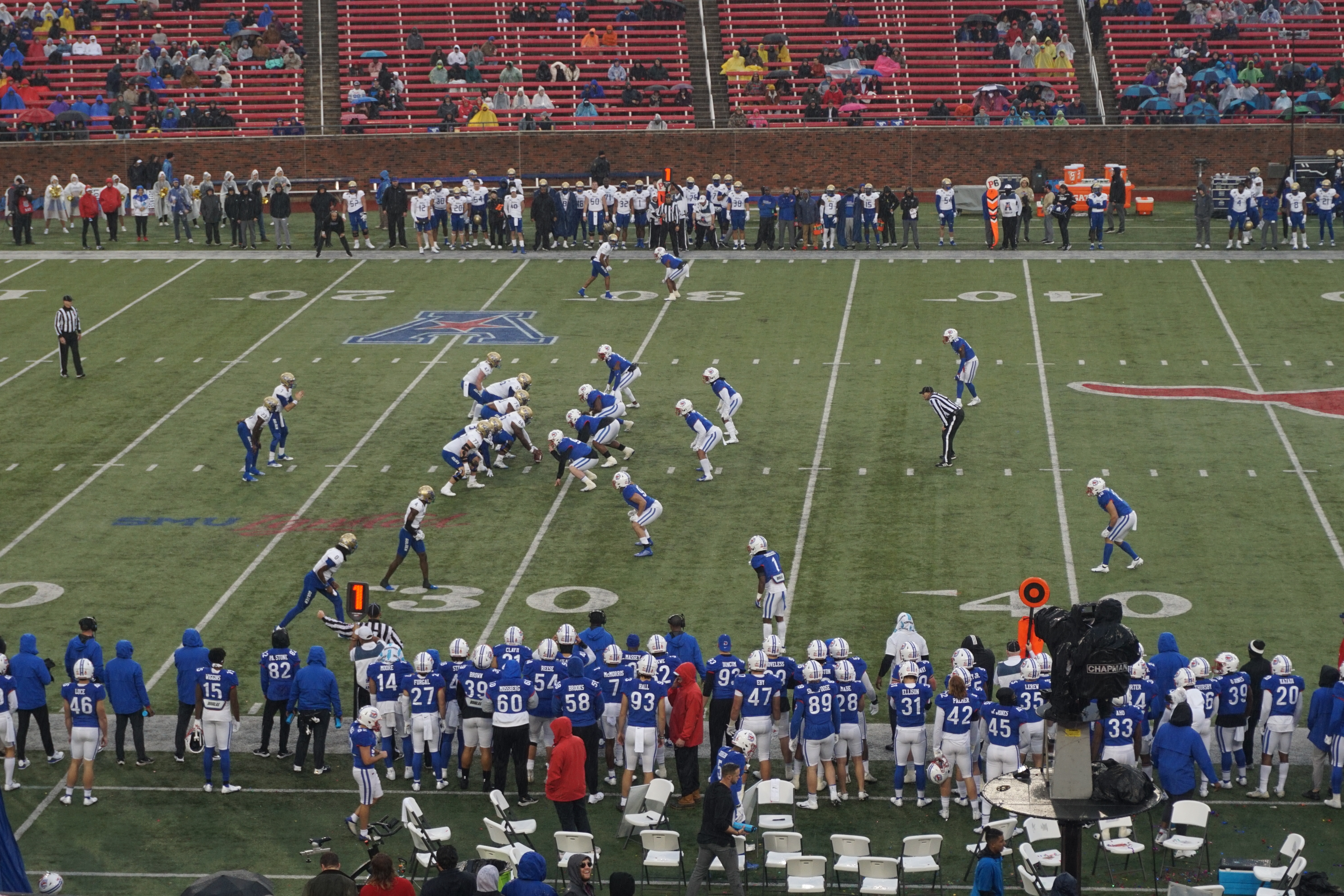
Tulsa in action at SMU

Ranking movements Legend: ██ Increase in ranking ██ Decrease in ranking — = Not ranked RV = Received votes
| | Week | | | | | | | | | | | | | | | |
| Poll | Pre | 1 | 2 | 3 | 4 | 5 | 6 | 7 | 8 | 9 | 10 | 11 | 12 | 13 | 14 | Final |
|---|---|---|---|---|---|---|---|---|---|---|---|---|---|---|---|---|
| AP | — | — | — | — | — | | | | | | | | | | | |
| Coaches | RV | — | — | — | — | | | | | | | | | | | |
| CFP | Not released | | | | | | | | | | | | | | | Not released |

== Roster ==
2021 Tulsa Golden Hurricane football team roster
Players
Coaches
Offense

| Pos. | # | Name | Class |
|---|---|---|---|
| WR | 0 | Ezra Naylor II | GS |
| QB | 1 | Braylon Braxton | Fr |
| WR | 2 | Keylon Stokes | GS |
| RB | 3 | Shamari Brooks | RSr |
| WR | 4 | Josh Johnson | RSr |
| WR | 5 | JuanCarlos Santana | RSr |
| RB | 6 | Jordan Ford | Jr |
| QB | 7 | Davis Brin | RJr |
| RB | 8 | Deneric Prince | RJr |
| WR | 9 | Sam Crawford Jr. | RSr |
| QB | 10 | Roman Fuller | RFr |
| WR | 11 | Josh Stewart | GS |
| QB | 12 | Seth Boomer | RSr |
| WR | 13 | Malachai Jones | RFr |
| WR | 15 | Malik Rodgers | RSo |
| QB | 16 | Carson Collins | RSo |
| TE | 19 | Grayson Boomer | RSo |
| WR | 20 | Cannon Montgomery | RSr |
| WR | 22 | Scottie Alexander | Fr |
| RB | 23 | Anthony Watkins | RSo |
| RB | 24 | Steven Anderson | RJr |
| RB | 25 | Bill Jackson | Fr |
| WR | 26 | Marquis Shoulders | Fr |
| WR | 28 | Corbin Daniels | Jr |
| TE | 32 | James Palmer | RJr |
| TE | 38 | Abe Anderson | RSr |
| TE | 47 | Ethan Hall | RSo |
| C | 50 | Gabe Cantu | So |
| C | 52 | Will Farniok | RJr |
| OL | 56 | Tyler Smith | RSo |
| C | 66 | Gerard Wheeler | RSr |
| OL | 68 | Tiller Bucktrot | GS |
| OL | 71 | Chris Paul | RSr |
| OL | 72 | Dillon Wade | RFr |
| OL | 73 | Dylan Couch | GS |
| OL | 74 | Jeremy Jones | RSo |
| OL | 75 | Dante Bivens | RSr |
| OL | 76 | Chester Baah | RSo |
| OL | 77 | Bryce Bray | RSo |
| OL | 78 | X'Zauvea Gadlin | RSo |
| OL | 79 | Jaden Muskrat | RFr |
| TE | 80 | Bayne Tryon | RFr |
| WR | 84 | Jalen Paxton | RFr |
| WR | 86 | Kamdyn Benjamin | RSo |
| WR | 88 | Kemani Brown | RFr |

Defense

| Pos. | # | Name | Class |
|---|---|---|---|
| CB | 0 | Tyon Davis | RSr |
| S | 1 | Kendarin Ray | RJr |
| CB | 2 | Travon Fuller | GS |
| S | 3 | Cristian Williams | GS |
| LB | 4 | Robert Revels III | GS |
| CB | 5 | Kenney Solomon | RSo |
| LB | 6 | Jon-Michael Terry | GS |
| S | 7 | TieNeal Martin | GS |
| LB | 8 | Brian Johnson | RJr |
| S | 9 | Daiquain Jackson | RSr |
| S | 10 | Sean O'Keefe | RFr |
| LB | 11 | Treyvon Reeves | GS |
| CB | 12 | Tyree Carlisle | So |
| CB | 15 | Reggie Ellis | RSo |
| S | 16 | Zion Hopes | Fr |
| S | 18 | Brad Hensley | RSo |
| LB | 19 | Grant Sawyer | Sr |
| LB | 20 | Jaden Moore | Fr |
| S | 21 | Bryson Powers | RSr |
| S | 22 | LJ Wallace | RJr |
| CB | 24 | DaMarco Williams | RFr |
| S | 25 | Jaise Oliver | RSo |
| S | 28 | Jett Hendrix | RJr |
| LB | 30 | Justin Wright | RJr |
| LB | 33 | Sam Clayton | RSo |
| CB | 34 | Kaylon Washington | RFr |
| LB | 35 | Yohance Burnett | GS |
| S | 37 | Hunter Rangel | RSo |
| LB | 40 | Mitchell Kulkin | RJr |
| LB | 41 | Dorian Hopkins | RSo |
| DL | 44 | Joseph Anderson | RJr |
| LB | 46 | Bershard Glaspie Jr. | RSo |
| LB | 47 | Daniel Giddens II | So |
| DL | 48 | Owen Ostroski | Fr |
| DL | 52 | Deven Lamp | RJr |
| LB | 54 | Trevor Reh | RSo |
| DL | 58 | Elijah Taylor | GS |
| DL | 90 | Jaxon Player | Sr |
| DL | 91 | Cullen Wick | GS |
| DL | 92 | Darrias Murdock | RSo |
| DL | 93 | Bryce Alonso | RJr |
| DL | 94 | Anthony Goodlow | RJr |
| DL | 95 | Cooper Laake | RSo |
| DL | 96 | Vincent Ume-Ezeoke | RSo |
| DL | 97 | Tyarise Stevenson | GS |
| DL | 98 | Haydon Grant | So |
| DL | 99 | Everitt Rogers | So |

Special teams

| Pos. | # | Name | Class |
|---|---|---|---|
| P | 37 | Lachlan Wilson | RSo |
| LS | 42 | Adam Higuera | GS |
| K | 43 | Tyler Tipton | RFr |
| K | 90 | Zack Long | GS |
| K | 95 | Alex Haight | So |

Head coach

- Philip Montgomery (Tarleton State)

Coordinators/assistant coaches

- Joseph Gillespie (Angelo State)
  Defensive coordinator, linebackers
- Carlton Buckels (LSU)
  Defensive passing game coordinator, cornerbacks coach
- Jayden Everett (Indiana State)
  Running backs coach
- Zach Hanson (Houston)
  Offensive line coach
- Calvin Lowry (Penn State)
  Receivers coach
- Luke Olson (Southern Nazarene)
  Nickel safeties coach
- Jordan Najvar (Baylor)
  Tight ends coach
- Kendrick Shaver (Missouri State)
  Safeties coach
- Beau Trahan (Texas)
  Quarterbacks coach
- Jesse Williams (Sonoma State)
  Defensive line coach
- Mookie Carlile (Tarleton State)
  Defensive quality control
- Grant Lester (Oklahoma)
  Offensive quality control
- Brody Trahan (Baylor)
  Quality control special teams & recruiting
- Nick Franey (Central Methodist)
  Offensive graduate assistant
- Verkedric Vaughns (Baylor)
  Defensive graduate assistant
- Ravi Savitala (UC Santa Cruz)
  Co-director of football operations/external
- Diane McPheeters (Baylor)
  Co-director of football operations/internal
- Dan Bitson (Tulsa)
  Director of player personnel & development
- Katie Newton (Arkansas)
  Director of football video services
- Tom Ososkie
  Director of scouting
- Sam Lazarus (Tulsa)
  Director of creative media

Legend

- (C) Team captain
- (S) Suspended
- (I) Ineligible
- Injured
- Redshirt

Roster

== After the season ==
=== 2022 NFL draft ===
The following Golden Hurricane players were selected in the 2022 NFL draft following the season.

| Round | Pick | Player | Position | NFL club |
|---|---|---|---|---|
| 1 | 24 | Tyler Smith | Offensive line | Dallas Cowboys |
| 7 | 230 | Chris Paul | Offensive line | Washington Commanders |
