= Alton McCaskill =

American football player (born 2003)

No. 22 – Sam Houston Bearkats
- Position: Running back
- Class: Graduate

Personal information
- Born: April 10, 2003 (age 23)
- Listed height: 6 ft 2 in (1.88 m)
- Listed weight: 220 lb (100 kg)

Career information
- High school: Oak Ridge (Montgomery, Texas)
- College: Houston (2021–2022); Colorado (2023); Arizona State (2024); Sam Houston (2025–present)

Awards and highlights
- AAC Rookie of the Year (2021); Second-team All-AAC (2021)
- Stats at ESPN

Alton McCaskill IV (born April 10, 2003) is an American college football running back for the Sam Houston Bearkats. He previously played for the Arizona State Sun Devils, Houston Cougars, and Colorado Buffaloes.

== Early life ==
McCaskill attended Oak Ridge High School. He was rated as a three-star recruit and committed to play college football for the Houston Cougars over schools such as Alabama, Auburn, Florida State, Notre Dame, Penn State, Michigan, Ole Miss and Vanderbilt.

== College career ==
=== Houston ===
In week 3 of the 2021 season, McCaskill rushed for 118 yards and three touchdowns in a win over Grambling State. He finished the season with 961 rushing yards and 16 touchdowns while also hauling in 113 receiving yards and two touchdowns. His 16 rushing touchdowns set a Houston freshman record. For his performance, he was named the American Athletic Conference Rookie of the Year, and second-team all-conference. Prior to the 2022 season, McCaskill suffered a season-ending torn ACL. After not playing in 2022, McCaskill entered his name into the NCAA transfer portal.

=== Colorado ===
McCaskill transferred to play for the Colorado Buffaloes. In 2023, he rushed just 14 times for 59 yards in four games in order to preserve his redshirt and use it to redshirt in 2023. After the season, McCaskill entered his name into the NCAA transfer portal for the second time.

=== Arizona State ===
McCaskill transferred to play for the Arizona State Sun Devils.

=== Sam Houston ===
On April 26, 2025, McCaskill announced that he would transfer to Sam Houston.

=== Statistics ===
Year	Team	Games		Rushing				Receiving			
Year	Team	GP	GS	Att	Yds	Avg	TD	Rec	Yds	Avg	TD
2021	Houston	14	12	189	961	5.1	16	21	113	5.4	2
2022	Houston	DNP (injury—knee)									
2023	Colorado	4	1	14	59	4.2	0	2	19	9.5	0
2024	Arizona State	8	0	7	17	2.4	0	0	0	0.0	0
2025	Sam Houston	8	3	88	370	4.2	1	9	66	7.3	1
Career		34	16	298	1,407	4.7	17	32	198	6.2	3
