= Jake Herslow =

American gridiron football player (born 1998)

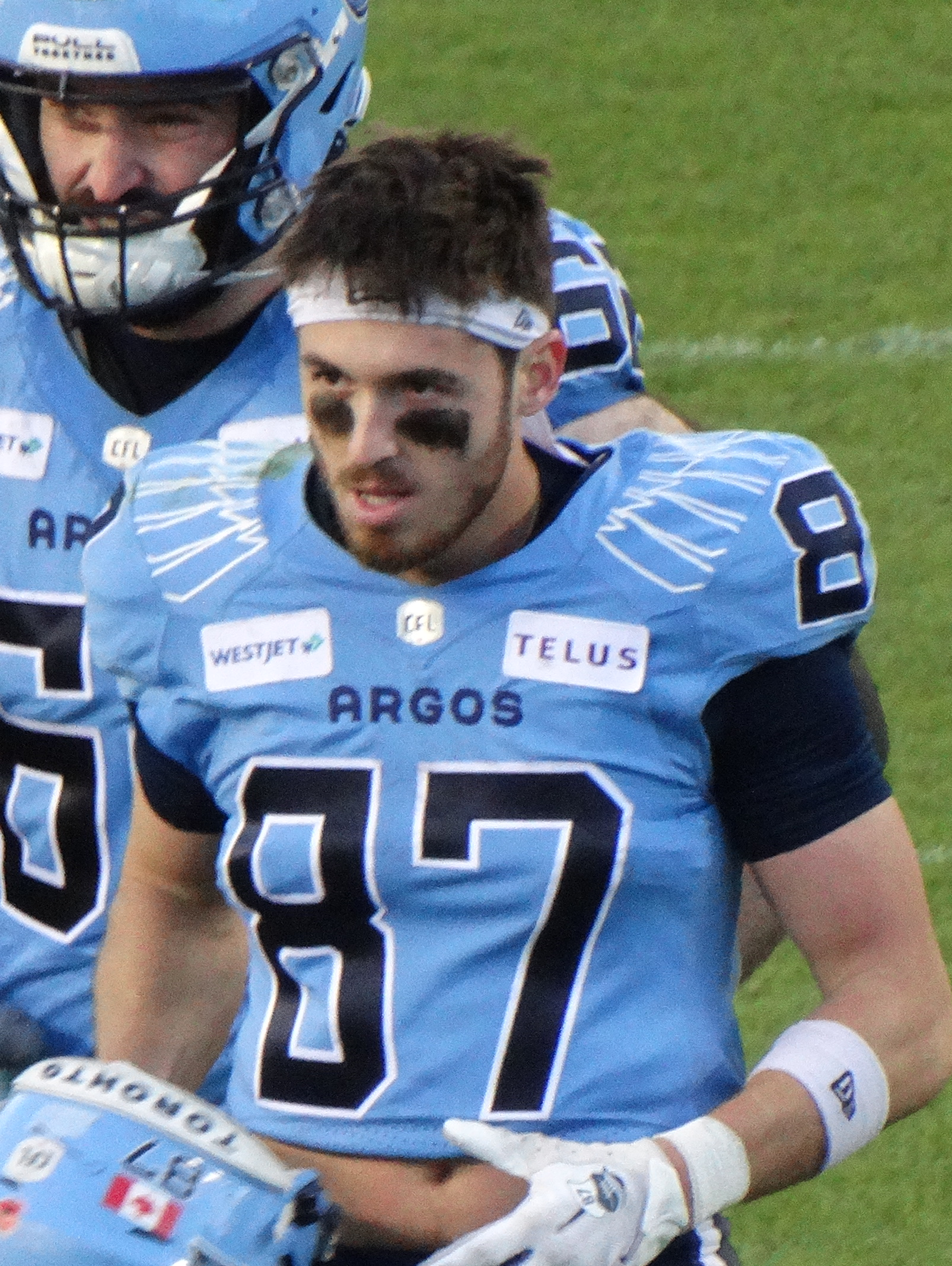
- Herslow with the Toronto Argonauts in 2024

No. 87 – Toronto Argonauts
- Position: Wide receiver
- Roster status: Active
- CFL status: American

Personal information
- Born: March 13, 1998 (age 28); Virginia Beach, Virginia, U.S.
- Listed height: 6 ft 0 in (1.83 m)
- Listed weight: 185 lb (84 kg)

Career information
- High school: Cox (Virginia Beach)
- College: Old Dominion (2017–2019); Houston (2021)
- NFL draft: 2022: undrafted

Career history
- Seattle Seahawks (2022)*; Houston Roughnecks (2023); Saskatchewan Roughriders (2023)*; Toronto Argonauts (2024–present)
- * Offseason or practice squad member only

Awards and highlights
- Grey Cup champion (2024)

Jake Herslow (born March 13, 1998) is an American professional football wide receiver for the Toronto Argonauts of the Canadian Football League (CFL).

== Early life ==
Herslow attended Frank W. Cox High School in Virginia Beach, Virginia.

== College career ==
After using a redshirt year in 2016, Herslow played college football for the Old Dominion Monarchs from 2017 to 2019. He played in 30 games with the Monarchs where he recorded 11 receptions for 109 yards along with 15 special teams tackles.

Herslow then transferred to the University of Houston and joined the Houston Cougars football team in 2021 as a walk-on. He played in all 14 games, starting in the last six, where he had 36 catches for 480 yards and five touchdowns.

== Professional career ==
Pre-draft measurables
Height	Weight	Arm length	Hand span	Wingspan	Bench press
5 ft 11 1/2 in (1.82 m)	181 lb (82 kg)	31 in (0.79 m)	9 in (0.23 m)	6 ft 1 1/4 in (1.86 m)	14 reps
All values from Pro Day

=== Seattle Seahawks ===
After going undrafted in the 2022 NFL draft, Herslow signed with the Seattle Seahawks on May 6, 2022. However, he was waived shortly after on May 13, when the team signed two other receivers.

=== Houston Roughnecks ===
Upon becoming eligible for the 2023 XFL draft, Herslow was allocated to the Houston Roughnecks. However, he was released on January 24, 2023.

=== Saskatchewan Roughriders ===
On April 28, 2023, it was announced that Herslow had signed with the Saskatchewan Roughriders. However, after suffering a knee injury in training camp, he was released on May 22. After becoming healthy, Herslow was re-signed on July 13, to a practice roster agreement. He did not dress in a game and was eventually released on August 19.

=== Toronto Argonauts ===
After the 2024 CFL season had started, Herslow was signed by the Toronto Argonauts June 14, 2024, to a practice roster agreement. He remained on the practice roster for most of the season until he played in the last regular season game of 2024 on October 25, against the Edmonton Elks. In that game, he recorded two receptions for 55 yards and scored his first touchdown on a 29-yard pass from Nick Arbuckle. With incumbent starter Damonte Coxie out with injury, Herslow also dressed in the team's East Semi-Final win over the Ottawa Redblacks where he had four catches for 47 yards and one touchdown. He dressed in the East Final victory over the Montreal Alouettes, but returned to the practice roster for the 111th Grey Cup where the Argonauts' defeated the Winnipeg Blue Bombers 41–24.

== Personal life ==
Herslow was born to parents Rob and Christine Herslow and has two brothers, Josh and Jeremy.
