= Clayton Tune =

American football player (born 1999)

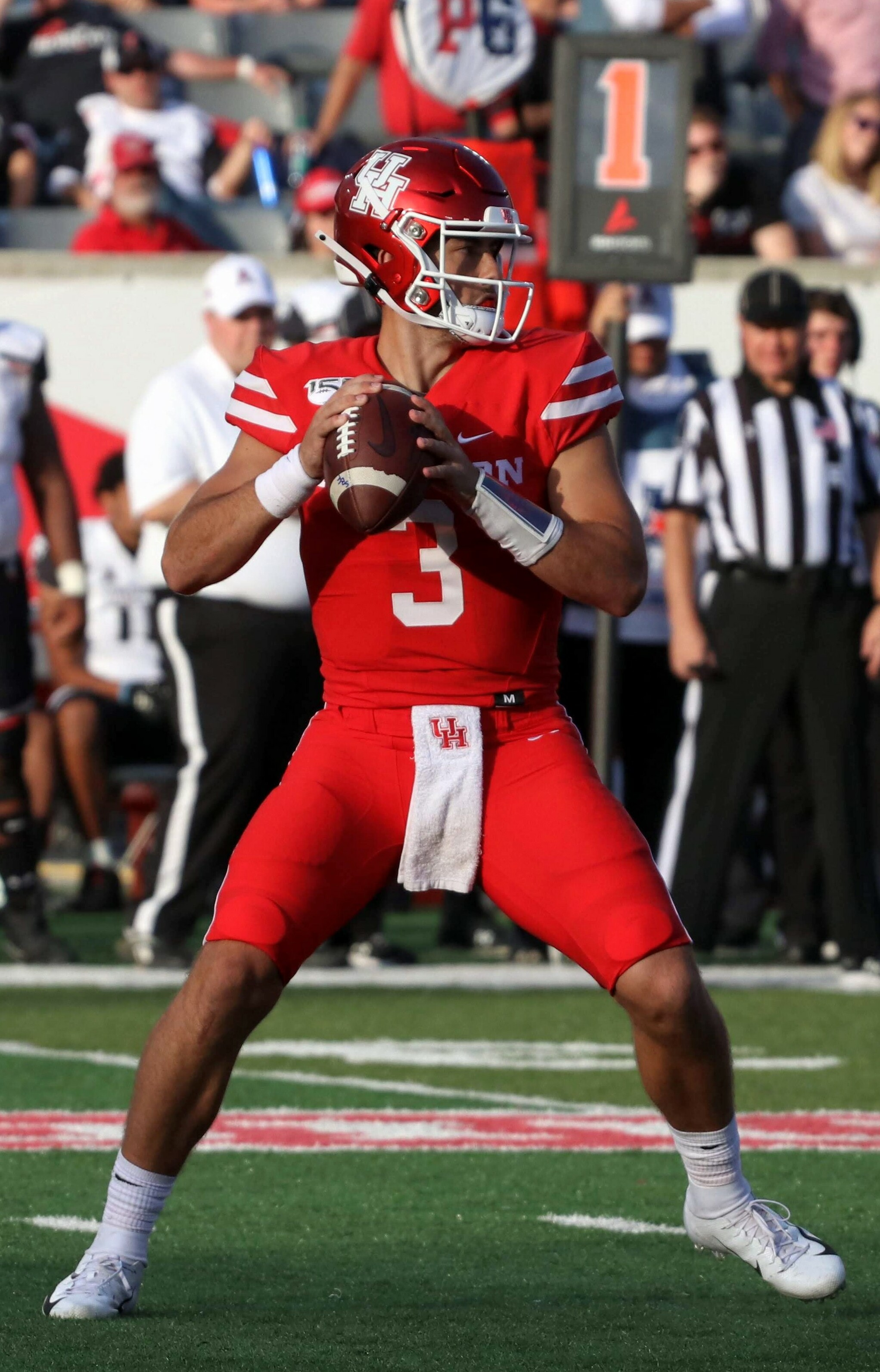
- Tune with the Houston Cougars in 2019

Profile
- Position: Quarterback

Personal information
- Born: March 23, 1999 (age 27); Plano, Texas, U.S.
- Listed height: 6 ft 3 in (1.91 m)
- Listed weight: 220 lb (100 kg)

Career information
- High school: Hebron (Carrollton, Texas)
- College: Houston (2018–2022)
- NFL draft: 2023: 5th round, 139th overall pick

Career history
- Arizona Cardinals (2023–2024); Green Bay Packers (2025); Columbus Aviators (2026)*
- * Offseason or practice squad member only

Awards and highlights
- First-team All-AAC (2022)

Career NFL statistics as of 2025
- Passing attempts: 38
- Passing completions: 21
- Completion percentage: 55.3%
- TD–INT: 0–3
- Passing yards: 112
- Passer rating: 27.7
- Stats at Pro Football Reference

Clayton Tune (born March 23, 1999) is an American professional football quarterback. He played college football for the Houston Cougars and was selected by the Arizona Cardinals in the fifth round of the 2023 NFL draft.

== Early life ==
Tune attended Hebron High School in Carrollton, Texas. During his career he had 6,686 passing yards with 66 passing touchdowns and 1,074 rushing yards and 20 rushing touchdowns. He originally committed to the University of Kansas to play college football but later changed his commitment to the University of Houston.

== College career ==
In his first year at Houston in 2018, Tune appeared in five games and made two starts as a backup to D'Eriq King. He started the final two games of the year in place of an injured King. For the season, he completed 59 of 117 passes for 795 yards with eight touchdowns and two interceptions. Tune entered 2019 again as the backup to King but took over as the starter after King decided to sit out the rest of the season. He completed 106 of 179 passes for 1,533 yards, 11 touchdowns and nine interceptions. Tune started all eight games in 2020, completing 170 of 285 passes for 2,048 yards, 15 touchdowns and 10 interceptions. In 2021, he started all 14 games and completed 287 of 421 passes for 3,546 yards with 30 touchdowns and 10 interceptions.

== Professional career ==
Pre-draft measurables
Height	Weight	Arm length	Hand span	40-yard dash	10-yard split	20-yard split	20-yard shuttle	Three-cone drill	Vertical jump	Broad jump
6 ft 2 1/2 in (1.89 m)	220 lb (100 kg)	31 3/8 in (0.80 m)	9 3/8 in (0.24 m)	4.64 s	1.55 s	2.63 s	4.25 s	6.89 s	37.5 in (0.95 m)	10 ft 2 in (3.10 m)
All values from NFL Combine

=== Arizona Cardinals ===
Tune was selected by the Arizona Cardinals in the fifth round (139th overall) of the 2023 NFL draft. Due to Joshua Dobbs being benched, Tune made his first NFL start on November 5, 2023, against the Cleveland Browns, where he threw for 58 yards and two interceptions. As a rookie, he appeared in seven games and made one start in the 2023 season.

Tune was waived by the Cardinals on August 25, 2025.

=== Green Bay Packers ===
On August 27, 2025, Tune signed with the Green Bay Packers' practice squad. On December 31, the Packers signed Tune to their active roster amid injuries to Jordan Love and Malik Willis, and he started for the team in Week 18, recording six completions for 34 yards and no touchdowns in the 16–3 loss to the Minnesota Vikings. He was waived by Green Bay on January 6, 2026.

=== Columbus Aviators ===
On January 12, 2026, Tune was allocated to the Columbus Aviators of the United Football League (UFL). Tune was released by the Aviators on February 9.

== NFL career statistics ==
Legend
**Bold**	Career high

=== Regular season ===
Year	Team	Games			Passing									Rushing					Sacks		Fumbles	
Year	Team	GP	GS	Record	Cmp	Att	Pct	Yds	Y/A	Lng	TD	Int	Rtg	Att	Yds	Avg	Lng	TD	Sck	SckY	Fum	Lost
2023	ARI	7	1	0–1	**12**	**21**	57.1	**62**	3.0	**14**	0	**2**	22.6	**8**	**30**	3.8	11	**1**	**7**	41	**2**	**1**
2024	ARI	6	0	—	2	2	**100.0**	8	**4.0**	7	0	0	**83.3**	7	−4	−0.6	2	0	0	0	1	**1**
2025	GB	2	1	0–1	7	15	46.7	42	2.8	8	0	1	25.7	5	23	**4.6**	**16**	0	5	**44**	1	0
Career		15	2	0–2	21	38	55.3	112	2.9	14	0	3	27.7	20	49	2.5	16	1	12	85	4	2
Source: pro-football-reference.com

=== College ===
Season	Team	Games			Passing								Rushing			
Season	Team	GP	GS	Record	Cmp	Att	Pct	Yds	Avg	TD	Int	Rtg	Att	Yds	Avg	TD
2018	Houston	5	2	0–2	59	117	50.4	795	6.8	8	2	126.6	41	53	1.3	1
2019	Houston	7	7	2–5	106	179	59.2	1,533	**8.6**	11	9	141.4	66	244	3.7	2
2020	Houston	8	8	3–5	170	285	59.6	2,048	7.2	15	**10**	130.4	72	253	3.5	**5**
2021	Houston	14	14	**12–2**	287	421	**68.2**	3,546	8.4	30	**10**	158.0	105	154	1.5	2
2022	Houston	13	13	8–5	**335**	**497**	67.4	**4,069**	8.2	**40**	**10**	**158.7**	**128**	**544**	**4.3**	**5**
Career		47	44	25–19	957	1,498	63.9	11,989	8.0	104	41	148.5	412	1,248	3.0	15
Source: sports-reference.com

== Personal life ==
Tune's great-great uncle was Jim Lawrence.
