= 2022 Gasparilla Bowl =

Postseason college football bowl game

2022 Union Home Mortgage Gasparilla Bowl
- 14th Gasparilla Bowl
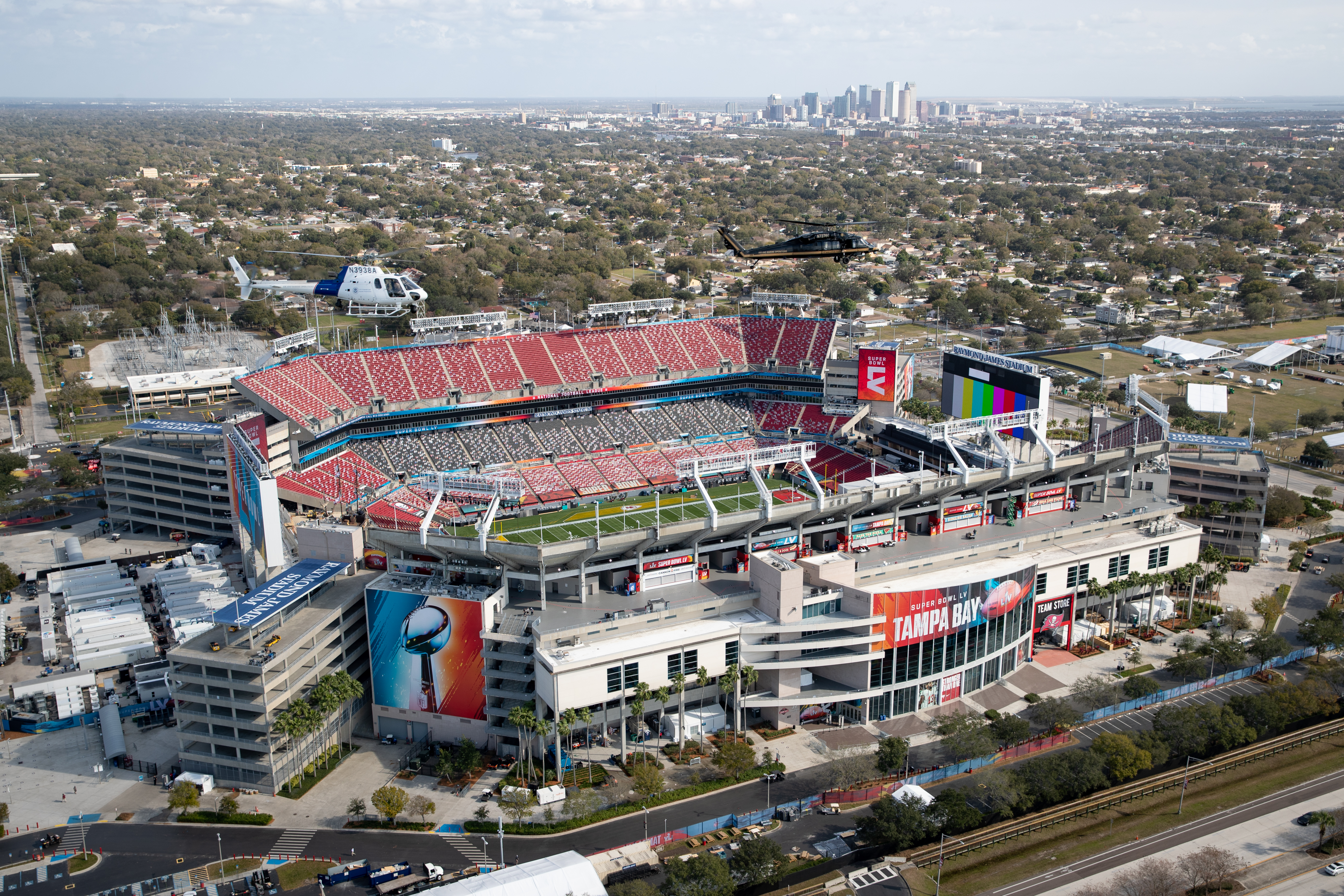
- Raymond James Stadium in Tampa, Florida, the site of the Gasparilla Bowl.
Wake Forest Demon Deacons	Missouri Tigers
(7–5)	(6–6)
ACC	SEC
27	17
Head coach: Dave Clawson	Head coach: Eliah Drinkwitz
	1	2	3	4	Total
Wake Forest	7	7	6	7	27
Missouri	3	7	7	0	17
- Date: December 23, 2022
- Season: 2022
- Stadium: Raymond James Stadium
- Location: Tampa, Florida
- MVP: Sam Hartman (QB, Wake Forest)
- Favorite: Wake Forest by 3
- National anthem: Sonya Bryson-Kirksey
- Referee: Kevin Boitmann (Big 12)
- Attendance: 34,370

United States TV coverage
- Network: ESPN
- Announcers: Chris Cotter (play-by-play), Aaron Murray (analyst), and Lericia Harris (sideline)

International TV coverage
- Network: ESPN Deportes

The 2022 Gasparilla Bowl (officially known as the Union Home Mortgage Gasparilla Bowl for sponsorship reasons) was a college football bowl game played on December 23, 2022, at Raymond James Stadium in Tampa, Florida. The 14th annual Gasparilla Bowl began at 6:35 p.m. EST and was aired on ESPN. The game was played between the Wake Forest Demon Deacons from the Atlantic Coast Conference (ACC) and the Missouri Tigers from the Southeastern Conference (SEC). It was one of the 2022–23 bowl games concluding the 2022 FBS football season.

Wake Forest scored the game's first points on their first possession after Sam Hartman passed to Taylor Morin for a touchdown, and Missouri scored their first points with a successful field goal later in the first quarter. Each team scored a touchdown in the second and third quarters, though Wake Forest missed an extra point attempt following one of their scores. Wake Forest entered the fourth quarter with a three-point lead, which they expanded to ten points with another touchdown, the last of the game. Wake Forest emerged victorious with a final score of 27–17.

The game was Hartman's last as a member of the Wake Forest team; he officially announced a transfer to Notre Dame on January 5, 2023. He was the game's most valuable player and finished his Wake Forest career having set the ACC record for passing touchdowns. Wake Forest finished the season with a record of 8–5, while Missouri finished 6–7.

== Teams ==
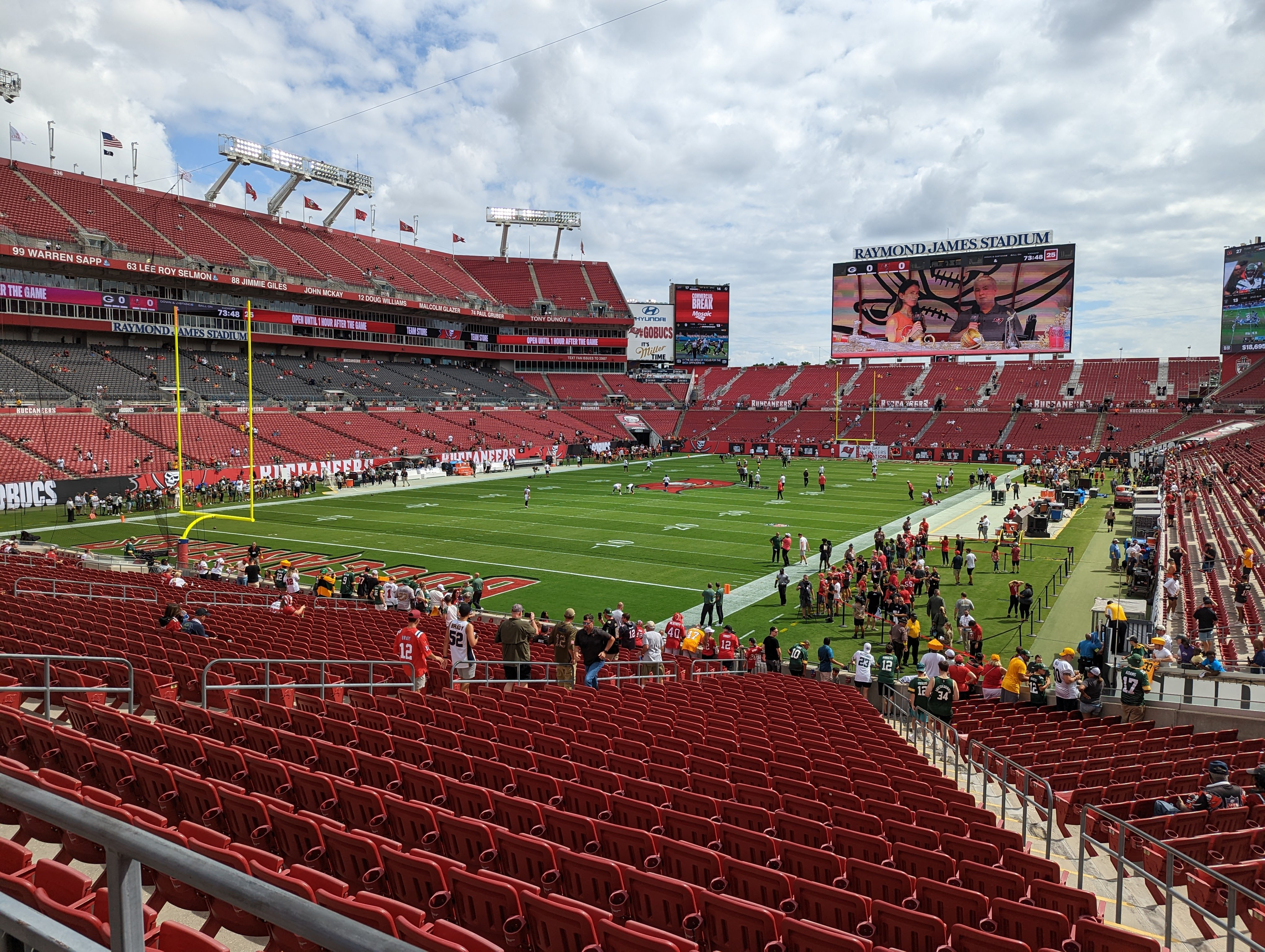
Raymond James Stadium, which hosted the game, pictured in 2022

The Gasparilla Bowl featured the Wake Forest Demon Deacons, from the Atlantic Coast Conference (ACC), against the Missouri Tigers, from the Southeastern Conference (SEC). This was the first time that Missouri and Wake Forest had ever faced each other. The game was Wake Forest's seventh straight appearance in a bowl and their 17th overall, with a 10–6 record overall. It was Missouri's third consecutive bowl game appearance and 34th overall, and the Tigers entered the game sporting a 14–19 bowl game record overall. They entered with a three-game losing streak in bowl games; their last postseason win was in the 2015 Citrus Bowl.

This edition of the Gasparilla Bowl was the first to feature two Power Five teams, and only three other Power Five teams had played in the game previously: NC State (in 2014), Mississippi State (in 2016), and Florida (in 2021).

=== Wake Forest ===
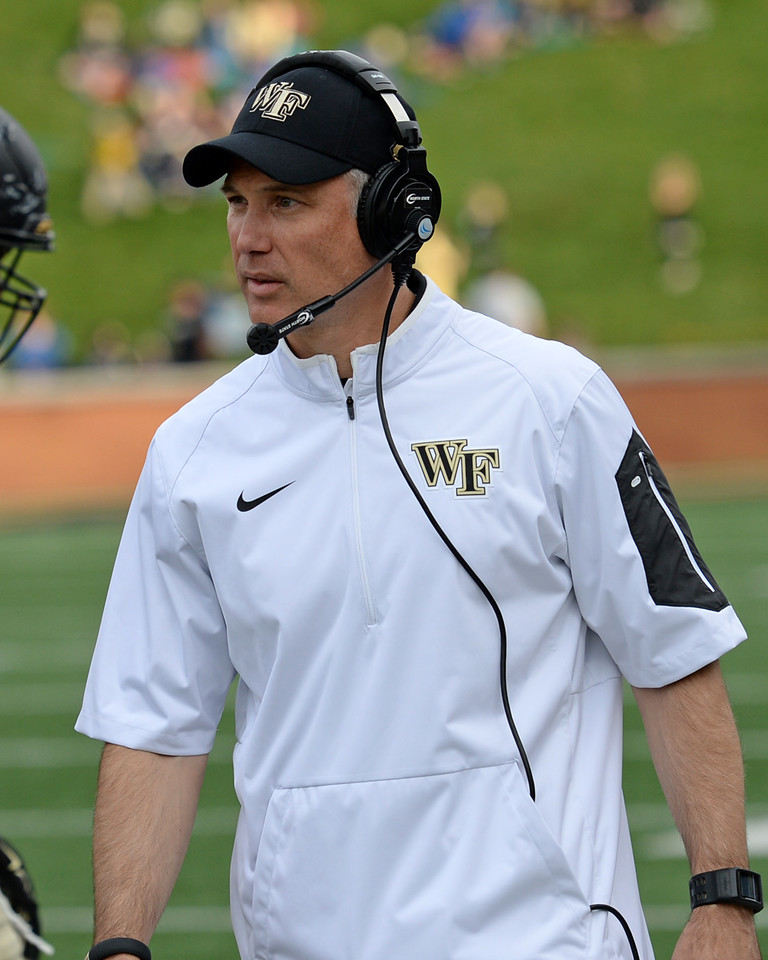
Wake Forest head coach Dave Clawson pictured in 2015

Wake Forest finished their regular season with a 7–5 record, losing four of their final five games after starting the season with six wins in their first seven games. They faced four teams ranked in the AP Top 25 poll during the season, defeating Florida State while losing to Clemson, NC State, and North Carolina.

One of the major headlines for Wake Forest entering the game was the impending departure of quarterback Sam Hartman; though it was not made clear before the game whether he would leave for the transfer portal or the NFL draft, it was announced that this would be his last game at Wake Forest. While the passing offense was viewed as a strength, the pass defense was analyzed to be more shaky and largely dependent on the ratio of pass plays to rush plays that were run by the opposing offense. The Demon Deacons defense was impacted by the loss of cornerbacks JJ Roberts and Gavin Holmes to the transfer portal; the latter announced his commitment to Texas two days before the game.

=== Missouri ===
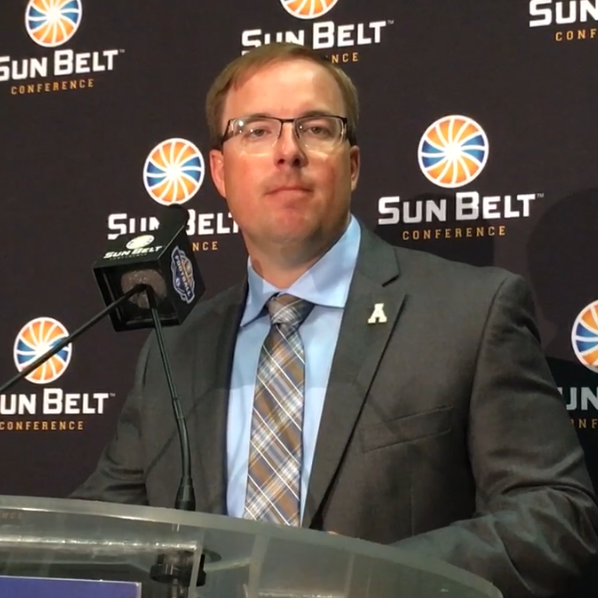
Missouri head coach Eliah Drinkwitz pictured in 2019

Missouri finished their regular season with a 6–6 record, winning their final two games to become bowl eligible. They faced three ranked teams during the season, defeating South Carolina while losing to Georgia and Tennessee.

The Tigers were without several players due to draft preparations: defensive ends Isaiah McGuire and DJ Coleman both opted-out, as did safety Martez Manuel; these three players were Missouri's top three sack leaders throughout the season. Wide receiver Dominic Lovett did not play in the game after entering the transfer portal following Missouri's last regular season game.

Mizzou's scoring offense was brought into question by analysts, as Wake Forest entered the game with a 2–5 record in games when they allowed over 30 points (in contrast, they had a 5–0 record when allowing fewer) but the Tigers had only reached the 30-point mark three times over the course of the regular season.

== Game summary ==
The game was televised on ESPN, with a commentary team of Chris Cotter, Aaron Murray, and Lericia Harris. It began at 6:35 p.m. EST. The game's officiating crew, representing the Big 12 Conference, was led by referee Kevin Boitmann and umpire Apollo Martin. Played at Raymond James Stadium in Tampa, Florida, the weather at the game's kickoff was clear with a temperature of 49 °F (9 °C).

=== First half ===
The game began with Ivan Mora's opening kickoff that gave Missouri the ball on their own 35-yard-line. The Tigers went three-and-out on their first drive and punted to the Demon Deacons and gave them the ball for their first possession at their own 15-yard-line. On offense, Sam Hartman found A.T. Perry for a 30-yard completion early on to move them past midfield. Several gains on the ground brought them to the Missouri 5-yard-line, where they scored the game's first touchdown on a 5-yard pass from Hartman to Taylor Morin. Missouri responded with a long, 15-play drive that spanned 58 yards and took nearly eight minutes off of the clock. They began after a touchback on their own 25-yard-line and successfully converted third downs on three occasions before failing to convert 3rd & 13 at the Wake Forest 19-yard-line. On the next play, Missouri scored their first points with a 35-yard field goal by Harrison Mevis. This left 1:46 on the clock and Wake Forest took all but ten seconds with a three-and-out and a punt to the Missouri 30-yard-line. The Tigers ran one play, a 10-yard rush by Brady Cook, before the quarter ended.

Missouri began the second quarter with a three-and-out, as they failed to gain the required five yards that remained and punted to the Wake Forest 37-yard-line following a fair catch. Wake Forest expanded their lead with a second touchdown drive to begin their first possession of the quarter, starting with a 27-yard pass from Hartman to Donavon Greene followed immediately by a 12-yard pass to Jahmal Banks, which reached the Missouri 24-yard-line. They ended up converting on 4th & 1 with an offside penalty against Missouri, and scored three plays later with a Justice Ellison rush. The teams then traded punts; Missouri set themselves back with a false start penalty and were unable to recover, punting on 4th & 16, and the Demon Deacons had to punt after a less successful five plays, though they got the ball back immediately after the punt was muffed by Luther Burden III. They were unable to take full advantage as Hartman threw an interception to Jaylon Carlies in the end zone, giving Missouri a touchback. Missouri, on the other hand, were able to take advantage of this mistake with a 7-play touchdown drive capped off by a 1-yard pass from Cook to Demariyon Houston. Wake Forest managed to convert a pair of third downs on their last drive of the half but ultimately faced 4th & 9 and had to punt; the Tigers reached the Wake Forest 31-yard-line with a 12-yard pass from Cook to Mookie Cooper on the final play of the half but were unable to run another play as time expired with Wake Forest leading by four points.

=== Second half ===
Wake Forest opened the second half promisingly, with a pair of Hartman-to-Perry passes that gained a first down, though they stalled from there and punted on 4th & 2, giving Missouri the ball on their own 17-yard-line. The teams then traded touchdowns, though in different ways: Missouri scored to take their first lead of the game on a 13-play drive that took nearly six and a half minutes off of the clock, with a touchdown eventually coming on a 4-yard rush by Cody Schrader, while Wake Forest drove 75 yards in four plays thanks to gains of 15 and 12 yards on passes that set up a 48-yard touchdown strike from Hartman to Banks. Matthew Dennis missed the extra point, keeping Wake Forest's lead at three points. After that, the teams traded three-and-outs, with Missouri committing a holding penalty on second down and ultimately kicking it away on 4th & 17, and Wake Forest picking up possession at their own 25-yard-line and advancing only five yards from there before they punted it back to their own 49-yard-line. Missouri was unable to take advantage of the field position, as they committed a turnover on downs after failing to convert 4th & 4 from the Wake Forest 43-yard-line after Cook's pass fell incomplete. On their next drive, the Demon Deacons were unable to find more success, as they faced 4th & 1 before a holding penalty set them back ten yards and sent the game into the fourth quarter.

The first play of the final quarter saw Wake Forest punt to Missouri, with a fair catch setting the Tigers up at their own 19-yard-line. Two passes and a rush by Cook picked up a first down, and a 12-yard pass two plays later put the ball on the 50-yard-line. after gaining 7 yards on their next two plays, the Missouri gained none on their next two, and turned the ball over on downs again. With under ten minutes to play, Wake Forest again failed to move the ball and punted on 4th & 18; the 31-yard kick gave Missouri the ball at their own 15-yard-line after Kris Abrams-Draine's fair catch. A 4th & 4 on Missouri's next series forced them into a similar outcome after a second-down sack took them from needing two yards to needing nine. Wake Forest fielded the punt on their own 25-yard-line and sparked their offense to an eight-play drive that included a roughing the passer penalty and a 15-yard rush by Ellison later on. The drive finished with a 16-yard touchdown pass from Hartman to Morin with 2:33 left on the clock, a play which extended the Demon Deacons' lead to ten points. Missouri's offense was set back by a loss of 12 yards resulting from a Kobie Turner sack, and suffered another sack, this one for a loss of 11 yards by Rondell Bothroyd, on the next play. They failed to convert 4th & 33 two plays later and gave the ball back to the Demon Deacons with one minute remaining; Wake Forest took a knee to run the clock out and secure a victory, 27–17.

=== Scoring summary ===
2022 Union Home Mortgage Gasparilla Bowl

Quarter	1	2	3	4	Total
Wake Forest	7	7	6	7	27
Missouri	3	7	7	0	17

at Raymond James Stadium • Tampa, Florida

- Date: Friday, December 23, 2022
- Game time: 6:30 p.m. EST
- Game weather: Clear • Temperature: 49 °F (9 °C) • Wind: 13 mph (21 km/h) northwest
- Game attendance: 34,370
- Referee: Kevin Boitmann
- TV announcers (ESPN): Chris Cotter (play-by-play), Aaron Murray (analyst), and Lericia Harris (sideline)
- Box score

Scoring summary

Quarter	Time	Drive			Team	Scoring information	Score	
Quarter	Time	Plays	Yards	TOP	Team	Scoring information	Wake Forest	Missouri
1	9:43	12	85	3:55	Wake Forest	Taylor Morin 5-yard touchdown reception from Sam Hartman, Matthew Dennis kick good	7	0
1	1:46	15	58	7:57	Missouri	35-yard field goal by Harrison Mevis	7	3
2	10:51	8	63	3:14	Wake Forest	Justice Ellison 1-yard touchdown run, Matthew Dennis kick good	14	3
2	2:28	7	80	2:27	Missouri	Demariyon Houston 1-yard touchdown reception from Brady Cook, Harrison Mevis kick good	14	10
3	5:45	13	83	6:22	Missouri	Cody Schrader 4-yard touchdown run, Harrison Mevis kick good	14	17
3	4:29	4	75	1:16	Wake Forest	Jahmal Banks 48-yard touchdown reception from Sam Hartman, Matthew Dennis kick wide right	20	17
4	2:33	8	75	3:22	Wake Forest	Taylor Morin 16-yard touchdown reception from Sam Hartman, Matthew Dennis kick good	27	17
"TOP" = time of possession. For other American football terms, see Glossary of American football.							27	17

== Statistics ==
Team statistical comparison
Statistic	Wake Forest	Missouri
First downs	21	21
First downs rushing	5	7
First downs passing	12	12
First downs penalty	4	2
Third down efficiency	6–15	8–19
Fourth down efficiency	0–0	2–5
Total plays–net yards	71–386	81–329
Rushing attempts–net yards	35–106	33–114
Yards per rush	3.0	3.5
Yards passing	280	215
Pass completions–attempts	23–36	29–48
Interceptions thrown	1	0
Punt returns–total yards	0–0	1–0
Kickoff returns–total yards	0–0	2–51
Punts–average yardage	7–32.0	5–38.6
Fumbles–lost	0–0	3–1
Penalties–yards	6–58	9–85
Time of possession	24:56	31:13

Wake Forest statistics
Demon Deacons passing
	C–A	Yds	TD–INT
Sam Hartman	23–37	280	3–1
Demon Deacons rushing
	Car	Yds	TD
Justice Ellison	21	64	1
Quinton Cooley	4	31	0
Sam Hartman	7	8	0
TEAM	2	−4	0
Demon Deacons receiving
	Rec	Yds	TD
A. T. Perry	11	116	0
Jahmal Banks	3	72	1
Taylor Morin	3	30	2
Donavon Greene	1	27	0
Quinton Cooley	2	15	0
Blake Whiteheart	1	8	0
Jaeger Bull	1	6	0
Justice Ellison	1	6	0

Missouri statistics
Tigers passing
	C–A	Yds	TD–INT
Brady Cook	28–47	227	1–0
Tigers rushing
	Car	Yds	TD
Cody Schrader	13	54	1
Brady Cook	14	43	0
Nathaniel Peat	5	39	0
Luther Burden III	1	−3	0
TEAM	1	−5	0
Tigers receiving
	Rec	Yds	TD
Mookie Cooper	7	69	0
Luther Burden III	6	52	0
Barrett Banister	7	49	0
Demariyon Houston	5	33	1
Mekhi Miller	2	20	0
Tavorus Jones	1	4	0

== Aftermath ==
Sam Hartman earned praise for his performance in the game and was named its most valuable player. After having announced an impending transfer before the game, he revealed on January 5, 2023, that his transfer destination was Notre Dame. He finished at Wake Forest having recorded over 13,000 career passing yards and a total of 110 touchdowns, an ACC record. He has been named a team captain and the starting quarterback for Notre Dame in their 2023 season opener against Navy.

Missouri's offense and defense both received praise for their improvement over the course of the game; Columbia Daily Tribune said that the defense, in particular, played well for parts of the second and third quarters but struggled later in the game. Wake Forest finished the season with an 8–5 record following their win, and Missouri fell to 6–7.

== See also ==
- 2023 ReliaQuest Bowl, contested at the same venue on January 2
