= Gasparilla Bowl =

NCAA-sanctioned post-season college football bowl game

- Union Home Mortgage Gasparilla Bowl
- Stadium: Raymond James Stadium
- Location: Tampa, Florida
- Previous stadiums: Tropicana Field (2008–2017)
- Previous locations: St. Petersburg, Florida (2008–2017)
- Operated: 2008–present
- Conference tie-ins: see tie-ins
- Previous conference tie-ins: Big East/AAC, C-USA, ACC
- Payout: US$1.125 million (2019)
- Website: gasparillabowl.com

Sponsors
- magicJack (2008); Beef O'Brady's (2009–2013); BitPay (2014); Bad Boy Mowers (2017–2019); Union Home Mortgage (2020–present)

Former names
- magicJack St. Petersburg Bowl (2008); St. Petersburg Bowl presented by Beef O'Brady's (2009); Beef O'Brady's Bowl (2010–2013); Bitcoin St. Petersburg Bowl (2014); St. Petersburg Bowl (2015–2016); Bad Boy Mowers Gasparilla Bowl (2017–2019); Union Home Mortgage Gasparilla Bowl (2020–present)

2025 matchup
- Memphis vs. NC State (NC State 31–7)

The Gasparilla Bowl is an annual NCAA-sanctioned post-season college football bowl game played in the Tampa Bay area. It was first played in 2008 as the St. Petersburg Bowl at Tropicana Field in St. Petersburg, Florida, one of several new bowl games played in Major League Baseball venues. The game was renamed the Gasparilla Bowl in 2017 as a nod to the legend of José Gaspar, a mythical pirate who supposedly operated in the Tampa Bay area and who is the inspiration for Tampa's Gasparilla Pirate Festival. The bowl relocated to Raymond James Stadium in Tampa in 2018.

Since 2020, the game has been sponsored by Union Home Mortgage and has been officially known as the Union Home Mortgage Gasparilla Bowl. Previous sponsors include magicJack (2008), Beef O'Brady's (2009–2013), BitPay (2014), and Bad Boy Mowers (2017–2019).

== History ==
The Gasparilla Bowl is the third college bowl game to be played in the Tampa Bay area. The first was the Cigar Bowl, which was played in Tampa from 1947 to 1954, and the second was the ReliaQuest Bowl, which has been held in Tampa since 1986 and was known as the Outback Bowl for over 20 years.

In 2008, the NCAA's Postseason Football Licensing Subcommittee approved a yet-to-be-named bowl game to be owned by ESPN and played at Tropicana Field after the 2008 college football season. Telecom company magicJack signed on as the title sponsor, and the inaugural magicJack St. Petersburg Bowl was played on December 20, 2008, between South Florida and Memphis, with the Bulls winning 41–14 behind Most Outstanding Player quarterback Matt Grothe.

For the 2009 game, restaurant chain Beef O'Brady's took over as presenting sponsor. The game became known as St. Petersburg Bowl Presented by Beef O'Brady's in December 2009 after the restaurant chain obtained a title sponsorship. Rutgers defeated UCF 45–24.

In 2010, the bowl's name was shortened to the Beef 'O' Brady's Bowl. Southern Miss faced Louisville; it was the 29th meeting between former Conference USA rivals. Louisville rallied from a 14-point deficit to win their sixth contest in a row against Southern Miss.

Beef 'O' Brady's stopped sponsoring the bowl after the 2013 edition. On June 18, 2014, it was announced that Bitcoin payment service provider BitPay would become the new sponsor of the game under a two-year deal, renamed the Bitcoin St. Petersburg Bowl. Bitcoin, the digital currency, was accepted for ticket and concession sales at the game as part of the sponsorship, and the sponsorship itself was also paid for using bitcoin. On April 2, 2015, after one year of sponsorship, BitPay declined to renew sponsorship of the game, and it was again called the St. Petersburg Bowl for the next two years.

On August 23, 2017, Bad Boy Mowers signed a three-year deal to become the official title sponsor of the game, which was rebranded as the Bad Boy Mowers Gasparilla Bowl, after Tampa's Gasparilla Pirate Festival. The sponsorship ended after the 2019 game.

On October 20, 2020, Union Home Mortgage signed on as title sponsor of the bowl, making it the Union Home Mortgage Gasparilla Bowl. The 2020 edition of the bowl was set to matchup South Carolina and UAB. However, on December 22, South Carolina had to withdraw from the bowl due to COVID-19 issues within their program. As no replacement team was available, the bowl was subsequently canceled.

=== Conference tie-ins ===
The first three editions of the bowl featured teams from C-USA and the Big East. The American Athletic Conference (AAC) succeeded the Big East after 2013. The bowl entered a six-year agreement with the ACC for the 2014 to 2019 seasons; the ACC would provide a team in 2014 and 2016, and would be an alternate for the other seasons. Ultimately, the only ACC team to play in the bowl during this period was NC State in 2014. Four of the five games from 2015 through 2019 featured a matchup between AAC and C-USA teams. The exception was 2016, when an overall lack of bowl-eligible teams yielded some "odd matchups"; the bowl's 2016 edition featured teams from the MAC and SEC.

As of the 2020 football season, the bowl has a large set of tie-ins, such that it could feature teams from eight different conferences as well as two independent programs:

- from the Power Five conferences: ACC, Big 12, Pac-12, SEC
- from the Group of Five conferences: AAC, C-USA, MAC, MWC
- independent programs: Army, BYU

Note: since 2020, both Army and BYU have joined conferences.

=== Stadium ===
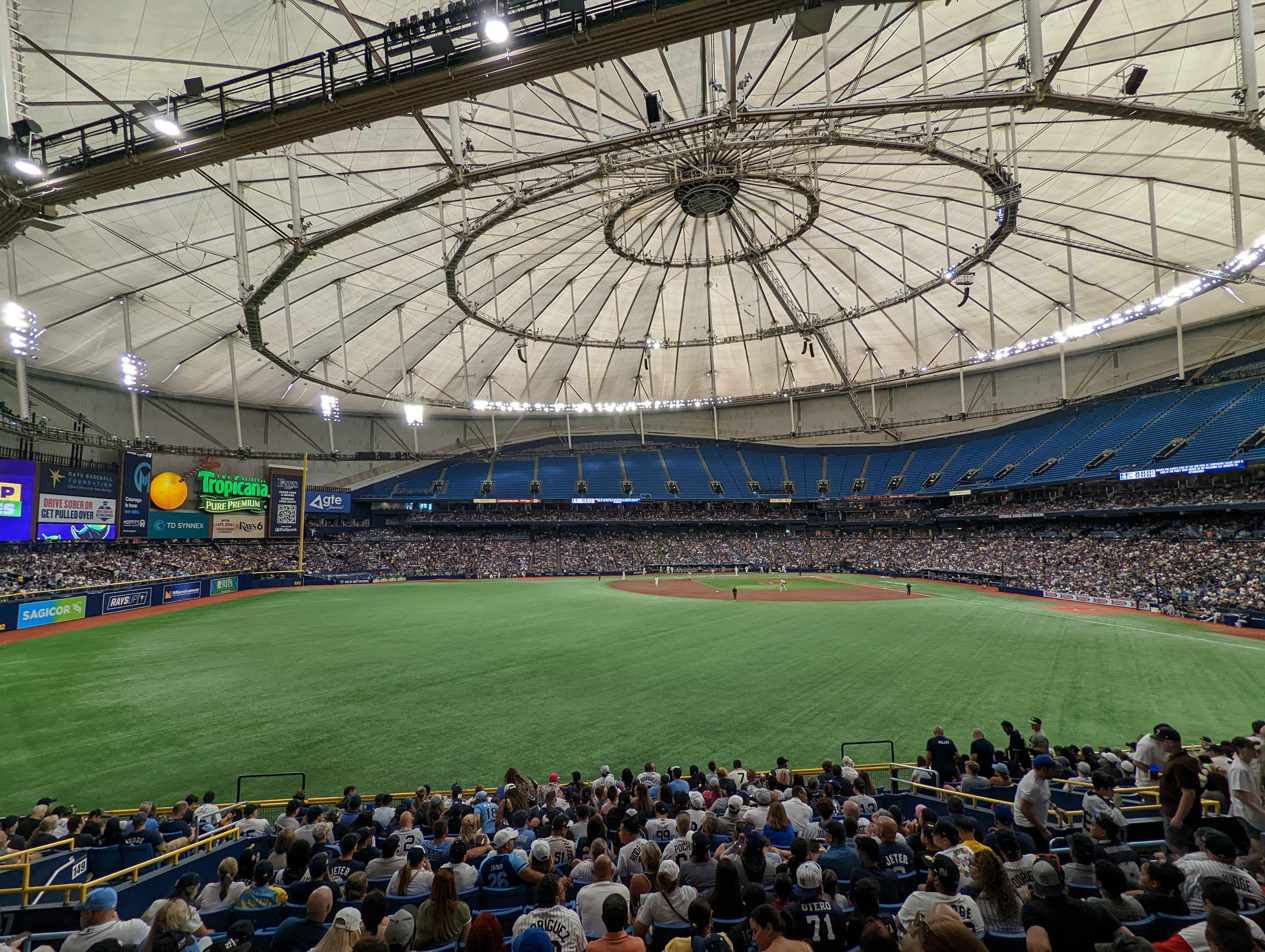
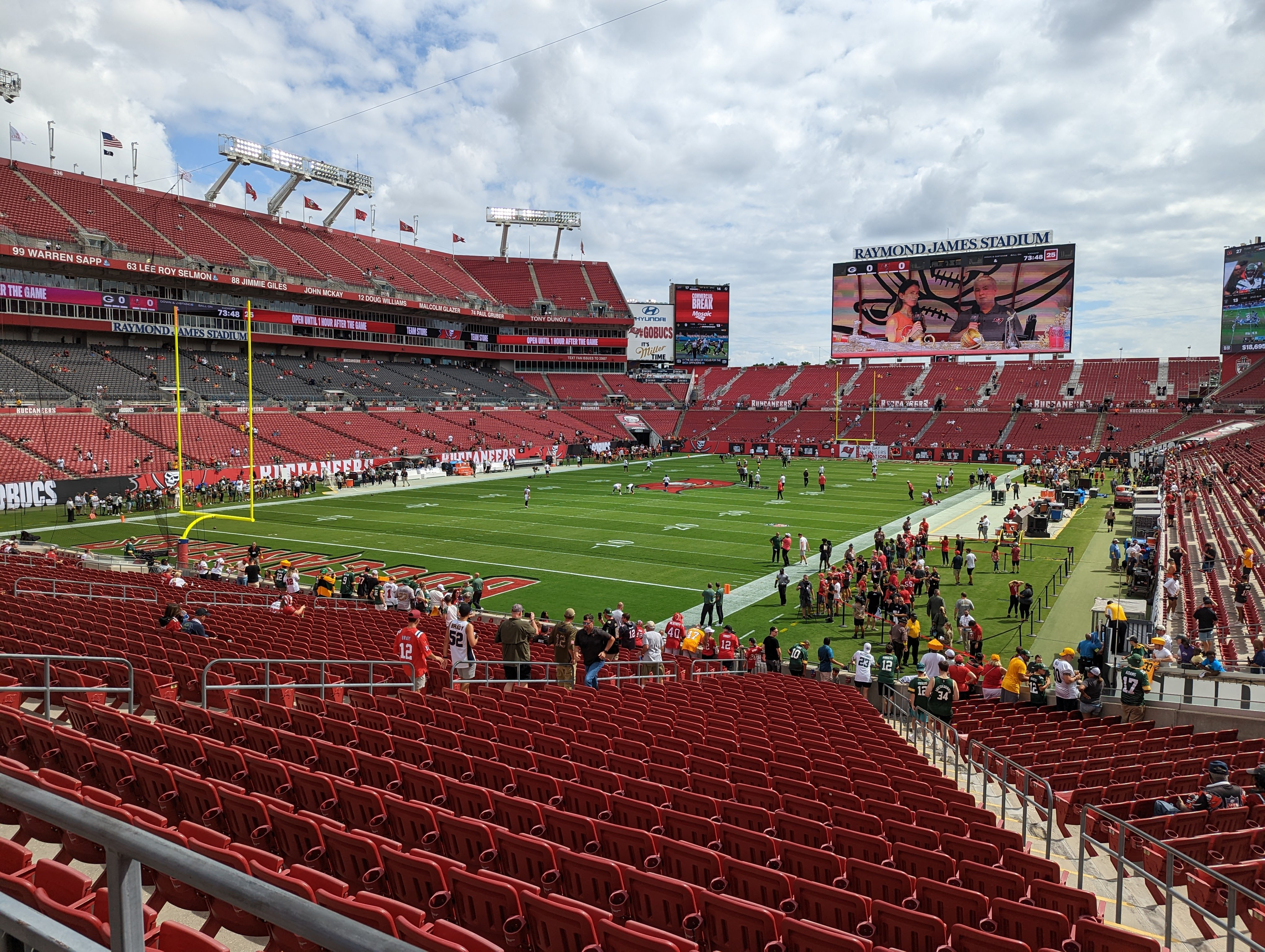
Tropicana Field (left) and Raymond James Stadium

The bowl has been played at Raymond James Stadium in Tampa since the 2018 edition. The first ten games were played at Tropicana Field in St. Petersburg.

"The Trop" is the home ballpark of the Tampa Bay Rays of MLB, and when it was first established, the then-St. Pete Bowl was one of several new college bowl games to be played in baseball venues. At Tropicana Field, the football gridiron was situated down the right field line from near home plate to the outfield wall with just enough room for the endzones.

== Game results ==
Date	Bowl name	Winning Team		Losing Team		Venue	Attendance
December 20, 2008	St. Petersburg Bowl	South Florida	41	Memphis	14	Tropicana Field	25,205
December 19, 2009	St. Petersburg Bowl	Rutgers	45	UCF	24	Tropicana Field	28,793
December 21, 2010	Beef 'O' Brady's Bowl	Louisville	31	Southern Miss	28	Tropicana Field	20,017
December 20, 2011	Beef 'O' Brady's Bowl	Marshall	20	FIU	10	Tropicana Field	20,072
December 21, 2012	Beef 'O' Brady's Bowl	UCF	38	Ball State	17	Tropicana Field	21,759
December 23, 2013	Beef 'O' Brady's Bowl	East Carolina	37	Ohio	20	Tropicana Field	20,053
December 26, 2014	St. Petersburg Bowl	NC State	34	UCF	27	Tropicana Field	26,675
December 26, 2015	St. Petersburg Bowl	Marshall	16	Connecticut	10	Tropicana Field	14,652
December 26, 2016	St. Petersburg Bowl	Mississippi State	17	Miami (OH)	16	Tropicana Field	15,717
December 21, 2017	Gasparilla Bowl	Temple	28	FIU	3	Tropicana Field	16,363
December 20, 2018	Gasparilla Bowl	Marshall	38	South Florida	20	Raymond James Stadium	14,135
December 23, 2019	Gasparilla Bowl	UCF	48	Marshall	25	Raymond James Stadium	28,987 (Note: 28,987 per game day summary; 33,539 per post-game summary)
December 26, 2020	Gasparilla Bowl	Canceled due to COVID-19 (Note: The 2020 game was scheduled to feature South Carolina vs. UAB, but South Carolina pulled out of the contest due to a COVID-19 outbreak among its coaching staff and no replacement team could be arranged on short notice.)				Raymond James Stadium	—
December 23, 2021	Gasparilla Bowl	UCF	29	Florida	17	Raymond James Stadium	63,669
December 23, 2022	Gasparilla Bowl	Wake Forest	27	Missouri	17	Raymond James Stadium	34,370
December 22, 2023	Gasparilla Bowl	Georgia Tech	30	UCF	17	Raymond James Stadium	30,281
December 20, 2024	Gasparilla Bowl	Florida	33	Tulane	8	Raymond James Stadium	41,472
December 19, 2025	Gasparilla Bowl	NC State	31	Memphis	7	Raymond James Stadium	13,336

== MVPs ==
From 2008 through 2016, an MVP was selected from each team; since 2017, a single game MVP is named.

Year	Winning team MVP			Losing team MVP		
Year	Player	Team	Position	Player	Team	Position
2008	Matt Grothe	South Florida	QB	Duke Calhoun	Memphis	WR
2009	Mohamed Sanu	Rutgers	WR	Kamar Aiken	UCF	WR
2010	Jeremy Wright	Louisville	RB	Austin Davis	Southern Miss	QB
2011	Aaron Dobson	Marshall	WR	T. Y. Hilton	FIU	WR
2012	Blake Bortles	UCF	QB	Jahwan Edwards	Ball State	RB
2013	Vintavious Cooper	East Carolina	RB	Donte Foster	Ohio	WR
2014	Jacoby Brissett	NC State	QB	Josh Reese	UCF	WR
2015	Deandre Reaves	Marshall	WR	Bobby Puyol	Connecticut	K
2016	Nick Fitzgerald	Mississippi State	QB	Gus Ragland	Miami (OH)	QB
2017	Frank Nutile	Temple	QB			
2018	Keion Davis	Marshall	RB			
2019	Dillon Gabriel	UCF	QB			
2021	Ryan O'Keefe	UCF	WR			
2022	Sam Hartman	Wake Forest	QB			
2023	Jamal Haynes	Georgia Tech	RB			
2024	DJ Lagway	Florida	QB			
2025	Caden Fordham	NC State	LB			

== Most appearances ==
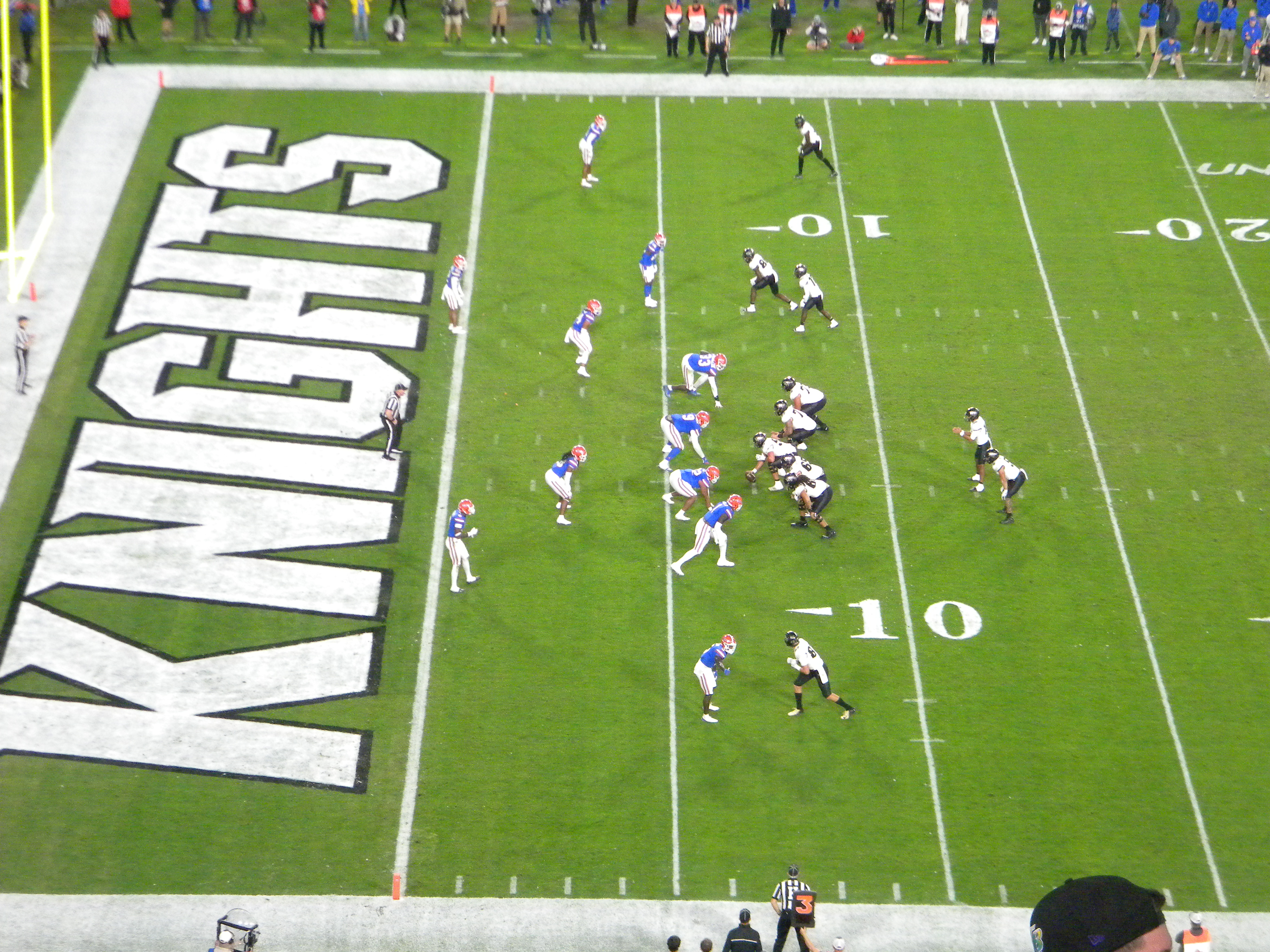
UCF in the red zone during the 2021 game

Updated through the December 2025 edition (17 games, 34 total appearances).

Teams with multiple appearances

Rank	Team	Appearances	Record
1	UCF	6	3–3
2	Marshall	4	3–1
3	NC State	2	2–0
3	South Florida	2	1–1
3	Florida	2	1–1
3	Memphis	2	0–2
3	FIU	2	0–2

Teams with a single appearance

Won (7): East Carolina, Georgia Tech, Louisville, Mississippi State, Rutgers, Temple, Wake Forest
Lost (7): Ball State, Connecticut, Miami (OH), Missouri, Ohio, Southern Miss, Tulane

== Appearances by conference ==
Updated through the December 2025 edition (17 games, 34 total appearances).

Conference	Record				Appearances by season	
Conference	Games	W	L	Win pct.	Won	Lost
American	11	6	5	.545	2008, 2009, 2010, 2017, 2019, 2021	2014, 2015, 2018, 2024, 2025
CUSA	10	5	5	.500	2011, 2012, 2013, 2015, 2018	2008, 2009, 2010, 2017, 2019
ACC	4	4	0	1.000	2014, 2022, 2023, 2025	
SEC	4	2	2	.500	2016, 2024	2021, 2022
MAC	3	0	3	.000		2012, 2013, 2016
Sun Belt	1	0	1	.000		2011
Big 12	1	0	1	.000		2023

- The record of the American Conference includes appearances of the Big East Conference, as the American retains the charter of the original Big East, following its 2013 realignment. Teams representing the Big East appeared in three games, compiling a 3–0 record.
- UCF has appeared as a member of C-USA (2009 and 2012), American (2014, 2019, 2021), and Big 12 (2023).

== Game records ==
Team	Performance, Team vs. Opponent	Year
Most points scored (one team)	48, UCF vs. Marshall	2019
Most points scored (both teams)	73, UCF vs. Marshall	2019
Most points scored (losing team)	28, Southern Miss vs. Louisville	2010
Fewest points allowed	3, Temple vs. FIU	2017
Margin of victory	27, South Florida vs. Memphis	2008
Total yards	587, UCF vs. Marshall	2019
Rushing yards	310, UCF vs. Marshall	2019
Passing yards	328, Ohio vs. East Carolina	2013
First downs	30, East Carolina vs. Ohio	2013
Fewest yards allowed	194, Florida vs. Tulane	2024
Fewest rushing yards allowed	35, Rutgers vs. UCF	2009
Fewest passing yards allowed	86, Marshall vs. Connecticut	2015
Individual	Player, Team vs. Opponent	Year
All-purpose yards	251, Ryan O'Keefe (UCF)	2021
Touchdowns (all-purpose)	3, shared by: Mohamed Sanu (Rutgers); Latavius Murray (UCF); Josh Reese, (UCF); CJ Bailey (NC State)	2009; 2012; 2014; 2025
Rushing yards	198, Vintavious Cooper (East Carolina)	2013
Rushing touchdowns	2, multiple times—most recent: Isaiah Bowser (UCF)	2021
Passing yards	305, DJ Lagway (Florida)	2024
Passing touchdowns	3, shared by: Matt Grothe (South Florida); Blake Bortles (UCF); Justin Holman (UCF); Sam Hartman (Wake Forest)	2008; 2012; 2014; 2022
Receptions	11, A. T. Perry (Wake Forest)	2022
Receiving yards	165, Randall St. Felix (South Florida)	2018
Receiving touchdowns	3, Josh Reese (UCF)	2014
Tackles	14 by several players, most recently: Greg Reaves (South Florida)	2018
Sacks	2, shared by: Steve Beauharnais (Rutgers); Tyler Williams (Wake Forest)	2009; 2022
Interceptions	1, by several players, most recently: Caden Fordham (NC State)	2025
Long Plays	Player, Record, Team vs. Opponent	Year
Touchdown run	62 yds., Desmond Johnson (Southern Miss)	2010
Touchdown pass	80 yds., Donte Foster from Derrius Vick (Ohio)	2013
Kickoff return	95 yds., Jeremy Wright (Louisville)	2010
Punt return	39 yds., Andre Snipes-Booker (Marshall)	2011
Interception return	75 yds., Micah Abraham (Marshall)	2019
Fumble return	55 yds., Tre'Mon Morris-Brash (UCF)	2019
Punt	61 yds., Tyler Williams (Marshall)	2015
Field goal	52 yds., Bobby Puyol (UConn)	2015

== Media coverage ==
The bowl has been televised on ESPN since its inception, and broadcast on ESPN Radio and later Gameday Radio.
