= 2021 UCF Knights football team =

American college football season

2021 UCF Knights football

Gasparilla Bowl champion

Gasparilla Bowl, W 29–17 vs. Florida
- Conference: American Athletic Conference
- Record: 9–4 (5–3 AAC)
- Head coach: Gus Malzahn (1st season)
- Co-offensive coordinators: G. J. Kinne (1st season); Tim Harris Jr. (1st season)
- Offensive scheme: Spread option
- Defensive coordinator: Travis Williams (1st season)
- Co-defensive coordinator: David Gibbs (1st season)
- Base defense: 4–2–5
- Home stadium: Bounce House

2021 American Athletic Conference football standings
	Conf.			Overall
Team	W		L	W		L
No. 4 Cincinnati y$^	8	–	0	13	–	1
No. 17 Houston y	8	–	0	12	–	2
UCF	5	–	3	9	–	4
East Carolina	5	–	3	7	–	5
Tulsa	5	–	3	7	–	6
SMU	4	–	4	8	–	4
Memphis	3	–	5	6	–	6
Navy	3	–	5	4	–	8
Tulane	1	–	7	2	–	10
South Florida	1	–	7	2	–	10
Temple	1	–	7	3	–	9
Championship: Cincinnati 35, Houston 20
^ – College Football Playoff participant; $ – Conference champion; y – Championship game participant; Rankings from AP Poll

The 2021 UCF Knights football team represented the University of Central Florida (UCF) during the 2021 NCAA Division I FBS football season. The Knights were led by first-year head coach Gus Malzahn and played their home games at Bounce House in Orlando, Florida. They competed as members of the American Athletic Conference.

The Knights started out the season 2–0 with a come-from-behind win against Boise State and a rout of Bethune–Cookman. However, the season was nearly derailed after the team suffered a rash of injuries during a last-minute loss at Louisville. Quarterback Dillon Gabriel suffered a season-ending broken clavicle, and by season's end, elected to enter the NCAA's transfer portal, eventually opting to play at Oklahoma. Injuries to running back Isaiah Bowser, defensive tackle Kalia Davis, wide receiver Jaylon Robinson, linebacker Tatum Bethune, center Corey Thornton, and several others, shuffled the starting lineups. Freshman Mikey Keene took over as starting quarterback, winning six of his nine starts, leading the Knights to an 8–4 record regular season (third place in the AAC) and 7–0 at home. The Knights concluded their season by defeating the Florida Gators in the Gasparilla Bowl.

The 2021 Knights will be profiled on the ESPN+ documentary Our Time: UCF Football.

== Preseason ==
=== Spring game ===
The 2021 UCF Spring exhibition game was held Saturday April 10 at the Bounce House. The team was split into two squads for gameplay, the Black squad (Knights) and the White squad (UCF). It marked the first appearance for new head coach Gus Malzahn. Quarterback Dillon Gabriel played exclusively for the Black squad, but other players switched jerseys during the game. Gabriel threw for 191 yards and two touchdowns, playing only in the first half. Running back Johnny Richardson had 7 carries for 67 yards, and wide receiver Ryan O'Keefe caught 6 passes for 83 yards (1 touchdown). Backup quarterbacks Quadry Jones and Mikey Keene also played.

Date	Time	Spring Game	Site	Result
April 10	12:00 pm	Black vs. White	Bounce House • Orlando, FL	34–17

=== American Athletic Conference preseason media poll ===
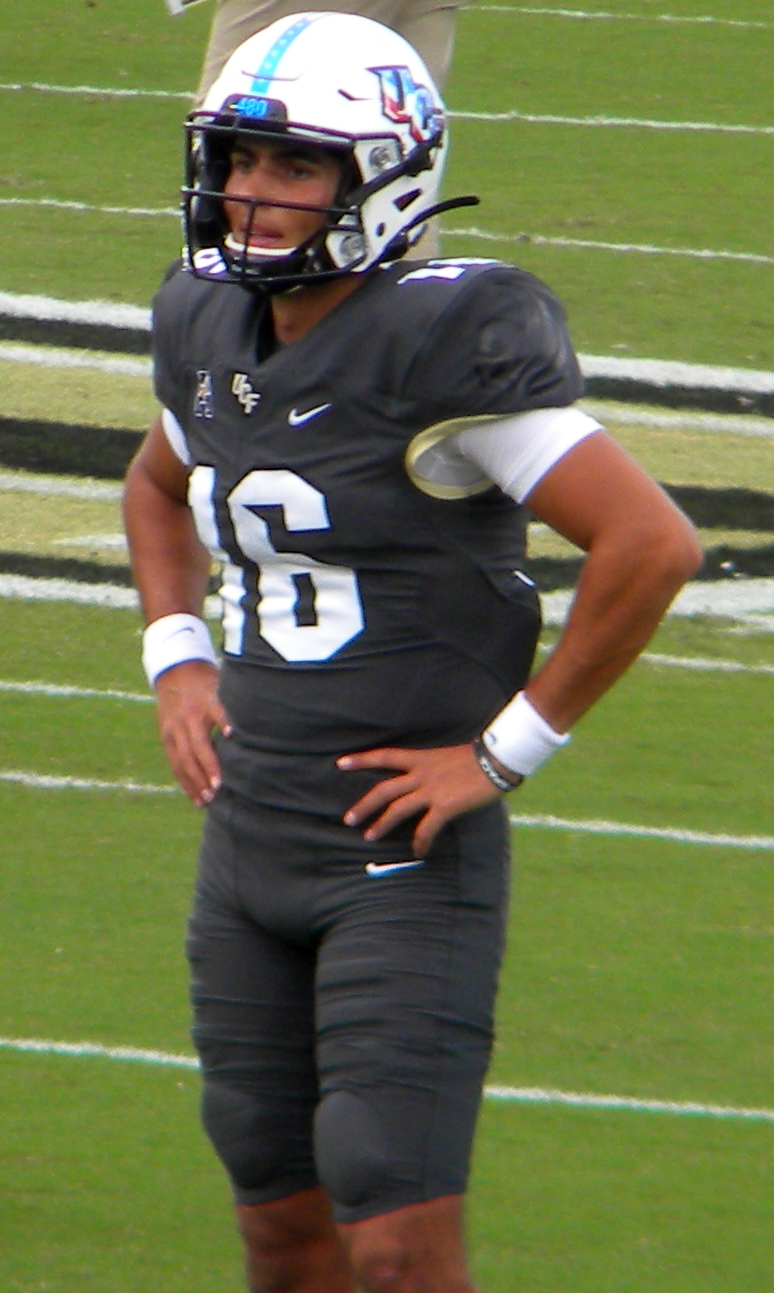
Freshman quarterback Mikey Keene

The American Athletic Conference preseason media poll was released at the virtual media day held August 4, 2021. Cincinnati, who finished the 2020 season ranked No. 8 nationally, was tabbed as the preseason favorite in the 2021 preseason media poll.

Media poll
Predicted finish	Team	Votes (1st place)
1	Cincinnati	262 (22)
2	UCF	241 (2)
3	SMU	188
4	Houston	181
5	Memphis	168
6	Tulsa	153
7	Tulane	132
т-8	East Carolina	85
т-8	Navy	85
10	Temple	46
11	South Florida	43

=== Training camp ===
Returning junior quarterback Dillon Gabriel entered training camp as the anticipated starter. It is expected to be Gabriel's third season under center. Former quarterback McKenzie Milton, who suffered a serious leg injury in 2018, entered the transfer portal at the end of 2020, and departed for Florida State. Likewise, back-up quarterback Darriel Mack Jr. left for Old Dominion. Three former Auburn players followed Gus Malzahn to UCF, including senior DE Markaviest "Big Kat" Bryant. Among the other key acquisitions included Northwestern transfer RB Isaiah Bowser.

== Schedule ==
Date	Time	Opponent	Site	TV	Result	Attendance
September 2	9:46 p.m.	Boise State*	Bounce House; Orlando, FL	ESPN	W 36–31	43,928
September 11	6:30 p.m.	Bethune–Cookman*	Bounce House; Orlando, FL	ESPN+	W 63–14	38,443
September 17	7:30 p.m.	at Louisville*	Cardinal Stadium; Louisville, KY	ESPN	L 35–42	39,022
October 2	3:30 p.m.	at Navy	Navy–Marine Corps Memorial Stadium; Annapolis, MD	CBSSN	L 30–34	30,871
October 9	6:00 p.m.	East Carolina	Bounce House; Orlando, FL	ESPN+	W 20–16	41,649
October 16	12:00 p.m.	at No. 3 Cincinnati	Nippert Stadium; Cincinnati, OH (rivalry)	ABC	L 21–56	37,978
October 22	7:00 p.m.	Memphis	Bounce House; Orlando, FL (Space Game)	ESPN2	W 24–7	39,328
October 30	12:00 p.m.	at Temple	Lincoln Financial Field; Philadelphia, PA	ESPN+	W 49–7	19,595
November 6	4:00 p.m.	Tulane^{†}	Bounce House; Orlando, FL	ESPNU	W 14–10	41,030
November 13	12:00 p.m.	at SMU	Gerald J. Ford Stadium; University Park, TX	ESPNU	L 28–55	23,175
November 20	4:00 p.m.	UConn*	Bounce House; Orlando, FL (Civil Conflict)	ESPN+	W 49–17	37,454
November 26	3:30 p.m.	South Florida	Bounce House; Orlando, FL (rivalry)	ESPN	W 17–13	41,157
December 23	7:00 p.m.	vs. Florida*	Raymond James Stadium; Tampa, FL (Gasparilla Bowl)	ESPN	W 29–17	63,669
*Non-conference game; ^{†}Homecoming; Rankings from AP Poll and CFP Rankings after November 24 released prior to game; All times are in Eastern time

== Game summaries ==
=== Boise State ===
	1	2	3	4	Total
Broncos	14	10	0	7	31
Knights	0	14	14	8	36

UCF hosted Boise State in the 2021 season opener. It was the first meeting between the two Group of Five front-runners, and the first game for new head coach Gus Malzahn. The kickoff was delayed about 2 hours and 46 minutes due to lightning in the area, but the inclement weather passed and the game played to completion without additional delay. Boise State jumped out to a 21–0 lead, but UCF rallied and held on for a 36–31 victory. UCF won their sixth consecutive season opener, and 14th season opener out of the last 16 years.

On their first drive of the first quarter, quarterback Dillon Gabriel swiftly drove the Knights to the Boise State 8 yard line. However, his pass was intercepted by Tyric LeBeauf at the goal line, who ran it back 100 yards for a Broncos touchdown. Trailing 21–0, the Knights finally got on the board with a 23-yard catch and run touchdown by Alec Holler early in the second quarter. In the final minute of the second quarter, Gabriel drove the Knights down the field and with 6 seconds left in the half, scrambled to find Titus Mokiao-Atimalala just inside the pylon for a touchdown and a 24–14 score at halftime.

UCF received the opening kickoff for the second half, and the Knights scored again. This time a touchdown pass from Gabriel to Brandon Johnson, who caught the ball on the right side of the endzone, his foot just inches from being out-of-bounds. With 56 seconds left in the third quarter, the Knights took the lead for the first time. Gabriel connected with Jaylon Robinson for a 23-yard over-the-shoulder touchdown pass, and a 28–24 lead.

The Knights defense stiffened in the second half, forcing the Broncos into three three-and-outs along with a safety. With UCF leading 30–24, momentum shifted back to the Broncos after Tyric LeBeauf intercepted Gabriel for the second time. The turnover led to a Boise State touchdown, and the Knights trailed by 1 point with 8 minutes left in regulation.

Gabriel drove the Knights 75 yards in ten plays (including a Targeting penalty by the Broncos), capped off with a 9-yard go-ahead touchdown run by Isaiah Bowser. With four minutes to go, the Broncos had one last chance. They drove to the UCF 35, but quarterback Hank Bachmeier was scrambling and threw up an easy interception for Dyllon Lester. The Knights were able to roll the clock down, and held on for a 36–31 victory. It matched the best comeback win in school history (21 points in 1984 & 2013). Gabriel finished the game with 318 passing yards, 64 yards rushing, and four touchdown passes, and Bowser has 32 carries for 170 yards (1 touchdown) in his Knights debut. The Knights extended their streak of scoring both a rushing touchdown and a passing touchdown to 50 consecutive games, the longest such active streak in the nation. The game ended at approximately 1:26 a.m. - 6 hours and 26 minutes after the originally-scheduled kickoff time of 7:00 p.m..

=== Bethune-Cookman ===
	1	2	3	4	Total
Wildcats	7	0	7	0	14
Knights	14	21	21	7	63

Quarterback Dillon Gabriel threw for 312 yards, two touchdown passes, and ran for one touchdown, as UCF routed Bethune–Cookman 63–14. Running back Isaiah Bowser had another strong showing with 59 yards rushing and four touchdown runs. The Knights improved to 2–0 on the season, just one day after formally accepting an invitation to join the Big XII Conference.

Kickoff was delayed about 50 minutes due to lighting in the area. Light, misty rain fell during the first half, but it did not significantly affect gameplay. It was the second straight week the Knights had a game delayed due to weather. The Knights extended their streak of scoring both a rushing touchdown and a passing touchdown to 51 consecutive games, the longest such active streak in the nation. At halftime, The Marching Wildcats of Bethune-Cookman joined UCF's Marching Knights for combined band salute to the twentieth anniversary of 9/11.

=== At Louisville ===
	1	2	3	4	Total
Knights	7	7	7	14	35
Cardinals	7	14	7	14	42

The UCF Knights fell at Louisville on Friday night, by the score of 42–35 for their first loss of the season. A rash of injuries were suffered during the night, sidelining several starters, including a fractured clavicle by quarterback Dillon Gabriel on the final play of the game.

Gabriel threw for 184 yards and three touchdown passes. He also ran for a touchdown, and caught a touchdown pass on a trick play from Ryan O'Keefe. Running back Isaiah Bowser managed only 37 yard rushing before being benched with a reported knee injury. A back and forth game saw the score tied 28–28 early in the fourth quarter.

Louisville was pinned back their own 9 yard line, but drove 91 yards in only four plays for a go-ahead touchdown with 9 minutes left in regulation. After forcing a punt, UCF got the ball back with just over three minutes to go. Gabriel swiftly drove the Knights 87 yards, capping off the drive with a 6-yard scramble and a 35–35 tie.

With 1:21 left in the game, Louisville drove to near midfield, looking to get into field goal range. On 3rd & 4, with 25 seconds left, Cardinals quarterback Malik Cunningham was pressured and his pass was tipped and intercepted by Tre'mon Morris-Brash. The Knights took over at the Louisville 41. On the first play of the ensuing drive, however, Gabriel's pass intended for Amari Johnson was deflected off of the receiver and fell into the hands of defender Jaylin Alderman. He ran the ball back 66 yards for the game-winning touchdown for Louisville. The Knights had one final possession, and attempted a hook and ladder play which went nowhere. Gabriel was tackled on the play, and suffered a broken clavicle. The Knights fell to 2–1 on the season heading into their bye week. The Knights extended their streak of scoring both a rushing touchdown and a passing touchdown to 52 consecutive games, the longest such active streak in the nation.

=== At Navy ===
	1	2	3	4	Total
Knights	13	10	7	0	30
Midshipmen	7	10	0	17	34

With six key starters – including quarterback Dillon Gabriel – missing the game with injuries, the Knights fell at Navy by the score of 34–30. Freshman Mikey Keene started at quarterback, and threw for 178 yards and two touchdowns. Johnny Richardson was the lead rusher (with Isaiah Bowser also out), with 64 yards. But the Knight's defense could not contain Navy's Triple option. The Midshipmen racked up 360 yards rushing, three touchdown runs, and nearly 40 minutes time of possession.

UCF led by as many as 13 points, but a blocked extra point, a blocked punt returned for a touchdown by Navy, and a fourth quarter fumble (which led to another Navy touchdown), were costly for the Knights. Navy scored 17 unanswered points in the fourth quarter, and held on for their first victory of the season

The Knights fell to 2–2 on the season (0–1 in conference). The Knights extended their streak of scoring both a rushing touchdown and a passing touchdown to 53 consecutive games, the longest such active streak in the nation.

=== East Carolina ===
	1	2	3	4	Total
Pirates	0	3	10	3	16
Knights	0	3	7	10	20

Running back Mark-Antony Richards punched the ball in from the 1 yard line with 23 seconds left in the game as UCF defeated East Carolina 20–16. Freshman Mikey Keene threw for 194 yards and an interception, to claim his first victory as starting quarterback. In a low-scoring game – the Knights' lowest points total since the 2016 Cure Bowl (13 points), and lowest winning score since 2014 (16–0 over USF), the Knights remained unbeaten at home on the season, and snapped a two-game losing streak.

Midway through the fourth quarter, the Pirates drove to the UCF 10 yard line, but a red zone stand by the Knights defense held the Pirates to a field goal. ECU took a 16–10 lead, which UCF trimmed to 16–13 after a Daniel Obarski field goal with 5:06 remaining. The Knights defense forced a three-and-out, and Keene got one last chance with 3:39 to go. In eleven plays, the Knights drove 64 yards for the game-winning touchdown. Facing a 4th & 8 at the ECU 43, Keene connected to Mark-Antony Richards and a first down to keep the drive alive. Richards followed that up with a runs of 19 yards, and 7 yards, followed by the game-winner, a 1-yard score.

The Knights improved to 3–2 on the season (1–1 in conference). The Knights, however, ended their streak of scoring both a rushing touchdown and a passing touchdown at 53 consecutive games. The streak had dated back to the beginning of the 2017 season.

=== At No. 3 Cincinnati ===
	1	2	3	4	Total
Knights	0	7	7	7	21
No. 3 Bearcats	14	21	7	14	56

The Knights were routed by #3 Cincinnati by the score of 56–21. The Bearcats jumped out to a dominating 35–0 lead before the Knights got on the board just before halftime. Quarterback Mikey Keene was held to only 141 yards passing and one touchdown pass. Running back Isaiah Bowser returned to the field after being sidelined for multiple weeks due to injury. Bowser finished with 27 yards and one touchdown.

=== Memphis ===
	1	2	3	4	Total
Tigers	0	7	0	0	7
Knights	14	0	7	3	24

The UCF Knights hosted Memphis on a Friday night game. It was the fifth annual edition of the "Space Game", which celebrates UCF's ties to NASA and the nearby Kennedy Space Center. The team's special uniform design honored the 40th anniversary of the Space Shuttle program. The UCF defense had a standout performance. With Tigers starting quarterback Seth Henigan inactive with a hand injury, the Knights intercepted Tigers back-up quarterback Peter Parrish three times, and sacked him six times. The special teams unit also recovered a Tigers fumble during a punt return. The Knights won the game 24–7 to remain unbeaten at home.

With Dillon Gabriel still recuperating from injury, Mikey Keene again started at quarterback. Joey Gatewood also took snaps under center. The Knights scored a touchdown on both of their first two offensive drives, building a 14–7 lead in the first half. However, the Knights offense went cold over the next five possessions. Keene was held to only 63 yards passing, one touchdown, and one interception. The Knights running game, however, racked up 215 yards rushing, and Ryan O'Keefe's 31-yard touchdown run in the third quarter put the Knights up 21–7.

Twice in the fourth quarter, the Tigers drove into the red zone, and both times Parrish had a pass deflected in the endzone for an interception. Trailing 24–7, the Tigers drove to the Knights 12 yard line with 2:23 remaining. On a 4th & 8, Parrish scrambled to the 5, and turned the ball over on downs. The Knights took over and ran clock out to win. The Knights improved to 4–3 on the season, 5–0 all-time in their annual Space Game, 14–2 against Memphis all-time, and 8–0 against Memphis at home.

=== At Temple ===
	1	2	3	4	Total
Knights	7	14	21	7	49
Owls	0	0	0	7	7

Freshman quarterback Mikey Keene threw a career-best five touchdown passes as the Knights soundly defeated Temple. The UCF defense recorded four sacks and forced three turnovers (fumbles). UCF dominated the game, jumping out to a 21–0 halftime lead. They led 49–0 until the Owls got a touchdown in the final 30 seconds to avoid the shutout.

Running back Isaiah Bowser rushed for 89 yards and one touchdown. The Knights improved to 5–3 on the season, and 3–2 in conference play. For the second consecutive week, the Knights held their opponent to only 7 points, and dating back to the previous game, achieved five straight shutout quarters.

=== Tulane ===
	1	2	3	4	Total
Green Wave	0	0	10	0	10
Knights	7	0	7	0	14

The UCF Knights hosted Tulane on Homecoming, on a cool, breezy afternoon. In a low-scoring, low-offense game, the Knights managed only 277 total yards, but emerged with a 14–10 victory. The Knights improved to 6–3 on the season, remained undefeated at home (5–0), and became bowl-eligible for the sixth straight season (a school record).

On Tulane's first possession, they drove to the UCF 6 yard line, but elected to go for it on a 4th & 1. Quarterback Michael Pratt's pass fell incomplete, and they turned the ball over on downs. The Knights took over at their own 6, and went on a 7-play, 94-yard drive to take a 7–0 lead in the first quarter. Quarterback Mikey Keene connected with Ryan O'Keefe for a 53-yard gain, then for a 15-yard catch and run screen pass for the touchdown. The rest of the first half, however, would see offensive futility by both teams. Tulane would punt on their next four possessions, and UCF would punt on their next three possessions.

Late in the second quarter, UCF drove to the Tulane 33 yard line. Keene was hit as he threw and lost the ball. Though it appeared to be an incomplete pass, the play was ruled a fumble and Tulane picked up the ball and ran it back to the UCF 29 yard line. The turnover was moot, as the Green Wave subsequently went three-and-out and kicker Merek Glover missed a 42-yard field goal to end the half.

Tulane took a 10–7 lead, scoring on their first two drives of the third quarter. Trailing by three, the Knights had a touchdown run by Johnny Richardson called back due to a holding penalty, then three plays later, missed a field goal attempt. The Knights defense forced a three-and-out and blocked Tulane's punt. UCF took over the Tulane 29, but back-to-back sacks set up a 3rd & 27, and they failed to convert. Andrew Osteen's punt was downed at the Tulane 1 yard line, flipping the field possession. Tulane went three-and-out again, and punted from their own endzone. With 5:55 left in regulation, Mikey Keene threw a 23-yard touchdown pass to Brandon Johnson in stride. The Knights took a 14–10 lead. The Green Wave had one last chance in the final two minutes. With no timeouts, the Green Wave got to the UCF 39 yard line. With 55 seconds left and counting, in what was the defensive play of the game, Quadric Bullard sacked Michael Pratt back at the Tulane 49 yard line. Two plays later, Pratt's Hail Mary pass fell short and incomplete as time expired

=== At SMU ===
	1	2	3	4	Total
Knights	14	0	7	7	28
Mustangs	21	17	7	10	55

UCF traveled to Dallas to take on SMU, but fell by the score of 55–28. The Knights defense got off to a hot start, forcing a turnover on downs and an interception, leading to a 14–7 first quarter lead. However, the Mustangs would put up 31 unanswered points to make the score 38–14 by halftime. SMU outgained the Knights in offensive yards 428–93 in the first half alone. On their next five possessions, the Knights offense was scoreless, including three three-and-outs, and a missed field goal. The SMU offense tallied 631 yards of offense, the most yards given up by the Knights defense thus far on the season. After suffering a fractured tibia the previous week, head coach Gus Malzahn coached the game from an elevated platform on the sidelines.

=== UConn ===
	1	2	3	4	Total
Huskies	0	14	0	3	17
Knights	21	14	0	14	49

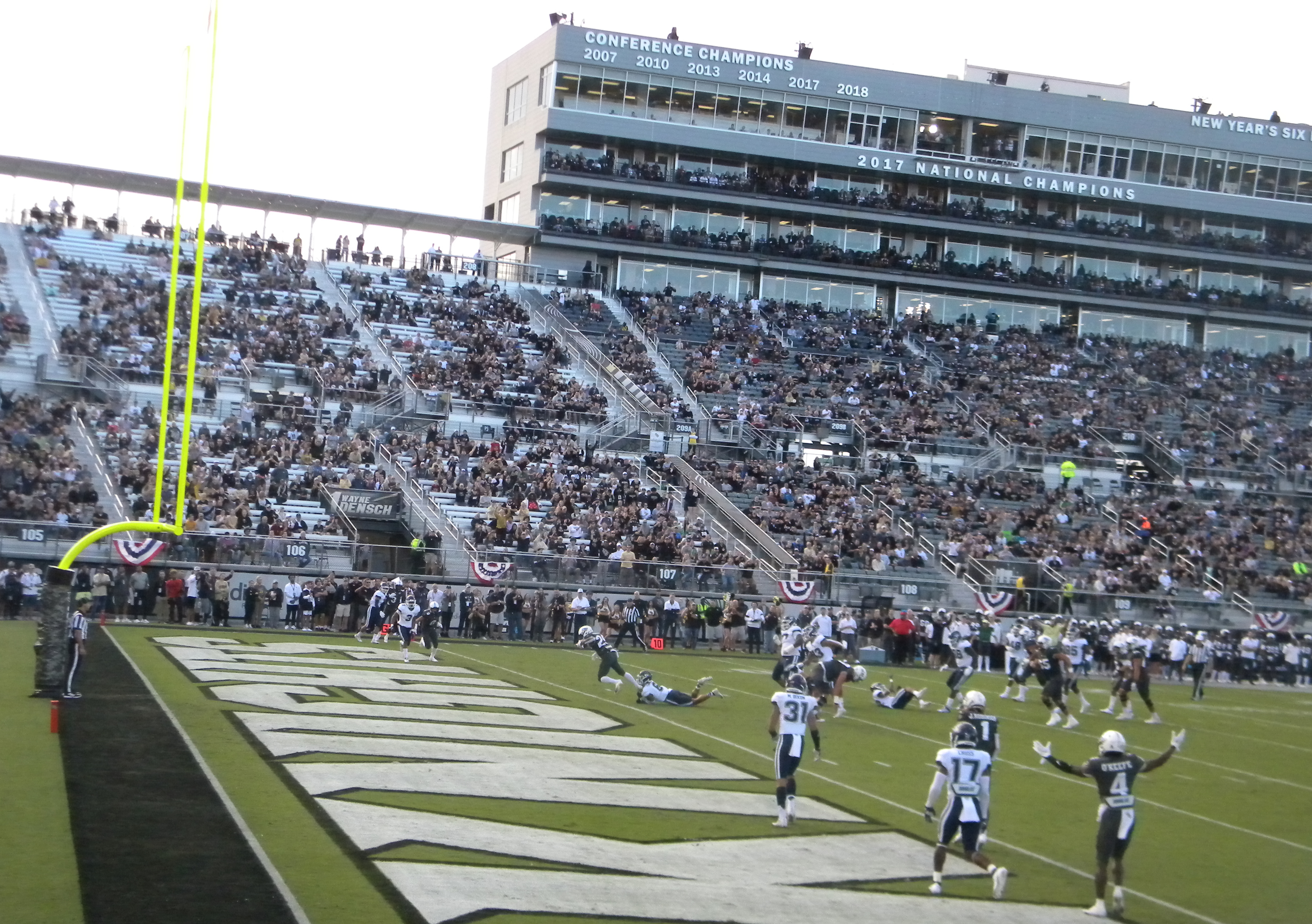
Johnny Richardson dives for a touchdown against UConn.

UCF defeated UConn 49–17 to remain undefeated at home on the season. The two former American Athletic Conference division foes met in a non-conference matchup. The game, briefly known as the Civil Conflict, is a rivalry UCF has never formally acknowledged. The game marked the milestone 500th game all-time in program history.

The Knights jumped out to a 21–0 lead in the first quarter, with touchdown runs by Johnny Richardson, Mark-Anthony Richards, and a 30-yard quarterback run by Mikey Keene. Keene evaded at least three tackles, cutting across the field, and dove for the right pylon for the score. Early in the second quarter, Keene and Richardson connected for a 17-yard touchdown pass, and a 28–0 lead. After a UConn interception (their second of the game), the Knights took over near midfield. In a trick play, wide receiver Ryan O'Keefe took a pitch and completed a pass to a wide open Brandon Johnson for a 49-yard touchdown.

After a scoreless third quarter, the Knights added two more touchdown in the fourth quarter, and held the Huskies to only 3 second half points. The Knights defense combined for five sacks on the day, nine tackles for loss, and three interceptions. UCF improved to 7–4 on the season. Still recuperating from a broken leg, head coach Gus Malzahn coached from the sidelines with crutches, after unsuccessfully trying to coach from an elevated platform the previous week.

=== South Florida ===
	1	2	3	4	Total
Bulls	7	0	6	0	13
Knights	7	7	0	3	17

UCF hosted conference rival South Florida on Black Friday in the War on I-4 in their regular season finale. The Knights were victorious by the score of 17–13 to finish the regular season undefeated at home (7–0). The UCF rushing attack, led by Johnny Richardson and Mark-Antony Richards put up 173 yards and one touchdown. A defensive goal line stand in the final seconds secured the win.

The first quarter saw touchdowns by both teams. Quarterback Mikey Keene's 23-yard pass to Johnny Richardson set the Knights up at the Bulls 5 yard line. Parker Navarro came in under center, and scored on a 3-yard quarterback keeper. The Bulls then tied the score after a 12-play, 72-yard drive, which included a 4th down conversion. The next three possessions for both teams were a three-and-out, a missed field goal, and another three-and-out. Titus Mokiao-Atimalala's 39-yard punt return set the Knights up at the South Florida 27 yard line. Six plays later, with 11 seconds left in the half, UCF was in the endzone with a 7-yard touchdown pass to Brandon Johnson. The Knights took a 14–7 lead into halftime.

The Bulls put up two field goals in the third quarter to trim the deficit to 14–13, but their next possession was another three-and-out. Mikey Keene drove the Knights deep into Bulls territory, but the drive stalled at the 14 yard line. Daniel Obarski kicked a 32-yard field goal with 8:45 left in regulation to give the Knights a 17–13 lead. The Bulls would get the ball back with one last chance with 2:43 remaining. Quarterback Timmy McClain completed passes of 30 yards to Jaren Mangham and 35 yards to Xavier Weaver to put the Bulls on the UCF 17 yard line. McClain was sacked by William Wells, but two quarterback scrambles got the Bulls a 1st & Goal at the UCF 3. With 9 seconds left on the clock, McClain rolled out to his left, but was pressured by Tre'mon Morris-Brash. McClain fell down, and threw up a desperation pass. The ball was intercepted by Quadric Bullard at the 2 yard line, but officials ruled that McClain's knee was down before he threw the ball. Furthermore, they ruled that the game clock had expired during the play, thus ending the game.

UCF won their fifth straight football game against South Florida, and for the first time took the lead (7–6) in the all-time series. The Knights finished the 2021 regular season 8–4 (5–3 in the AAC), and placed third in the conference standings. The Knight set a mark of 30–2 at the Bounce House since the start of the 2017 season.

=== Vs. Florida (Gasparilla Bowl) ===
	1	2	3	4	Total
Knights	0	9	17	3	29
Gators	7	3	7	0	17

The UCF Knights accepted an invitation on December 5, 2021, to the Gasparilla Bowl to face the Florida Gators. It was the fifth appearance overall in the Gasparilla Bowl for the Knights, a game formerly known as the St. Petersburg Bowl and Beef O'Brady's Bowl. It was the third meeting all-time between UCF and Florida; the Gators had won both previous meetings. On December 10, 2021, the game was officially announced as a sellout, the first time the Gasparilla Bowl has sold out in its history. A crowd of 63,669 attended at Raymond James Stadium in Tampa, on a cool, clear, 57° evening. UCF defeated the Gators for the first time, behind standout performances by wide receiver, and game MVP, Ryan O'Keefe and running back Isaiah Bowser. Penalties, dropped passes, and kicking woes plagued the Gators.

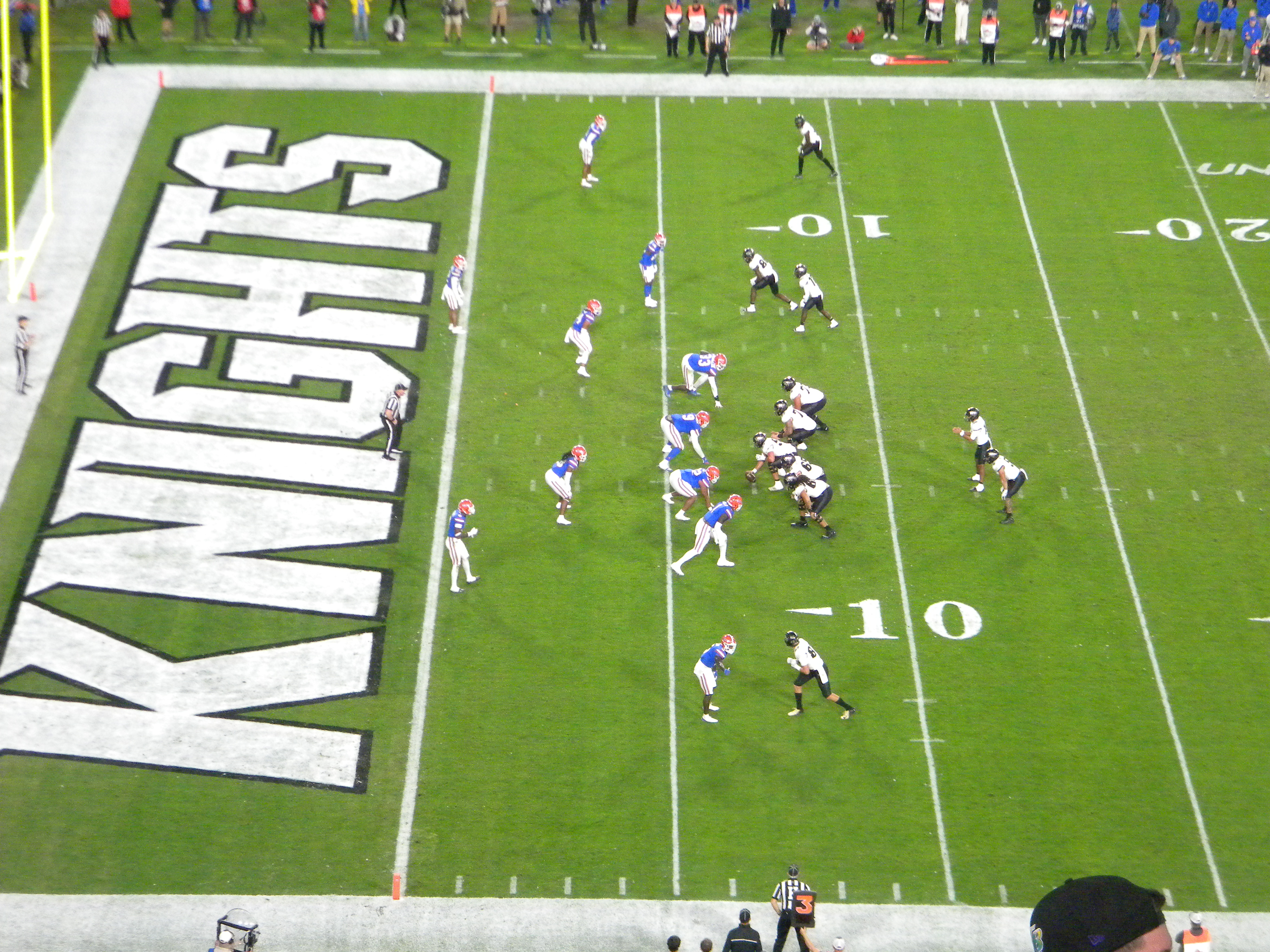
UCF in the red zone during the 2021 Gasparilla Bowl

Florida won the coin toss and elected to receive. Both teams started out slowly, punting on each of their first two drives. At the 6:37 mark of the first quarter, Florida drove into UCF territory. Facing a 4th & 5 at the 27 yard line, the Gators went for it on fourth down. The UCF defense forced an incomplete pass, and a turnover on downs. The Gators put the first points on the board with an 8-play, 58-yard touchdown drive. Dameon Pierce's 1-yard touchdown run gave the Gators a 7–0 lead. Then with less than a minute left in the first quarter, Johnny Richardson broke free for a 38-yard gain to the Florida 34.

Two plays into the second quarter, the Knights faced a 4th & 5 at the Florida 29 yard line. Quarterback Mikey Keene's quick pass to Nate Craig-Meyers got the first down, and kept the drive alive. Isaiah Bowser's 3-yard touchdown run subsequently put the Knights on the board. UCF elected to go for two, but Andrew Brito's pass to Jake Hescock fell incomplete, and the Gators held a 7–6 lead.

Emory Jones drove the Gators down the field, but a penalty helped stall the drive. The Gators kicking woes came to light when Chris Howard ended the drive with a missed a 34-yard field goal attempt. UCF took over after the missed field goal with good field position. At the Gators 41, Keen pitched a reverse to Ryan O'Keefe, who broke free for a 34-yard gain down to the 7 yard line. The Gators defense, however, held the Knights to a field goal attempt. Daniel Obarski's 34-yard field goal gave the Knights a 9–7 lead. The Gators managed a field goal in the final two minutes, and took a 10–9 into halftime.

UCF received the ball to start the second half. Chris Howard's kickoff went out of bounds, giving the Knights the ball at the 35 yard line. On the first play of the third quarter, Isaiah Bowser broke free for a big gain down the Florida 29. The drive came up empty, however, with a missed field goal attempt. The Gators went three-and-out on their first drive of the second half, punting the ball back to the Knights, who took over at their own 21 yard line. On the second play of the drive, Keene pitched another reverse to Ryan O'Keefe, who for the second time ran free for a huge gain. This time tight roping down the sidelines for 74 yards to the Gators 4 yard line. Bowswer punched the ball in on the next play for a touchdown, and a 16–10 UCF lead. After the play, an unsportsmanlike conduct penalty on the Gators assessed a 15-yard penalty on the subsequent kickoff, and Ty'Ron Hopper was ejected. Daniel Obarski's squib kickoff was fumbled by the Gators, but the Gators recovered and maintained possession.

Emory Jones moved the Gators down the field with a quick 20-yard pass to Rick Wells, followed by a 32-yard run by Malik Davis. The drive was capped off with a 19-yard touchdown run by Davis. The Gators took a 17–16 lead with just under 8 minutes left in the third quarter. An unsportsmanlike conduct penalty on UCF was assessed on the kickoff, and just like before, a squib onside kick almost resulted in a recovery by the kicking team. The Knights started the drive at the Florida 41. Back-to-back penalties on the Gators (Taunting and Roughing the passer) advanced the Knights 30 yards. A mix of short passes and runs got the Knights to the 4 line. Obarski kicked a chip-shot field goal, and the Knights took a 19–17 lead.

The Gators were held to a three-and-out. Jones missed a wide-open Justin Shorter, who might have reached the endzone in stride. Instead, a short punt set the Knights up at their own 46. Striking fast, on the first play of the drive, Keene hit Ryan O'Keefe for a 54-yard catch and run touchdown. The Knights extended their lead to 26–17 to start the fourth quarter.

The Knights wore down a tired Gators defense in the fourth quarter. Isaiah Bowser finished the night with 35 carries for 155 yards (two touchdown runs). The Knights took time off the clock, and tacked on a field goal, and the final score was 29–17. Ryan O'Keefe was named the most valuable player, with 110 yards receiving and 85 yards on the ground. O'Keefe dedicated his performance to former teammate Otis Anderson's memory. A scary moment occurred with just over two minutes left in the game when Gators wide receiver Justin Shorter went up to catch a pass, but collided with Quadric Bullard. Shorter fell to the ground, snapping his head back, and lay motionless on the field for several minutes. Shorter was transported to a local hospital, and was released the following day.

== Personnel ==
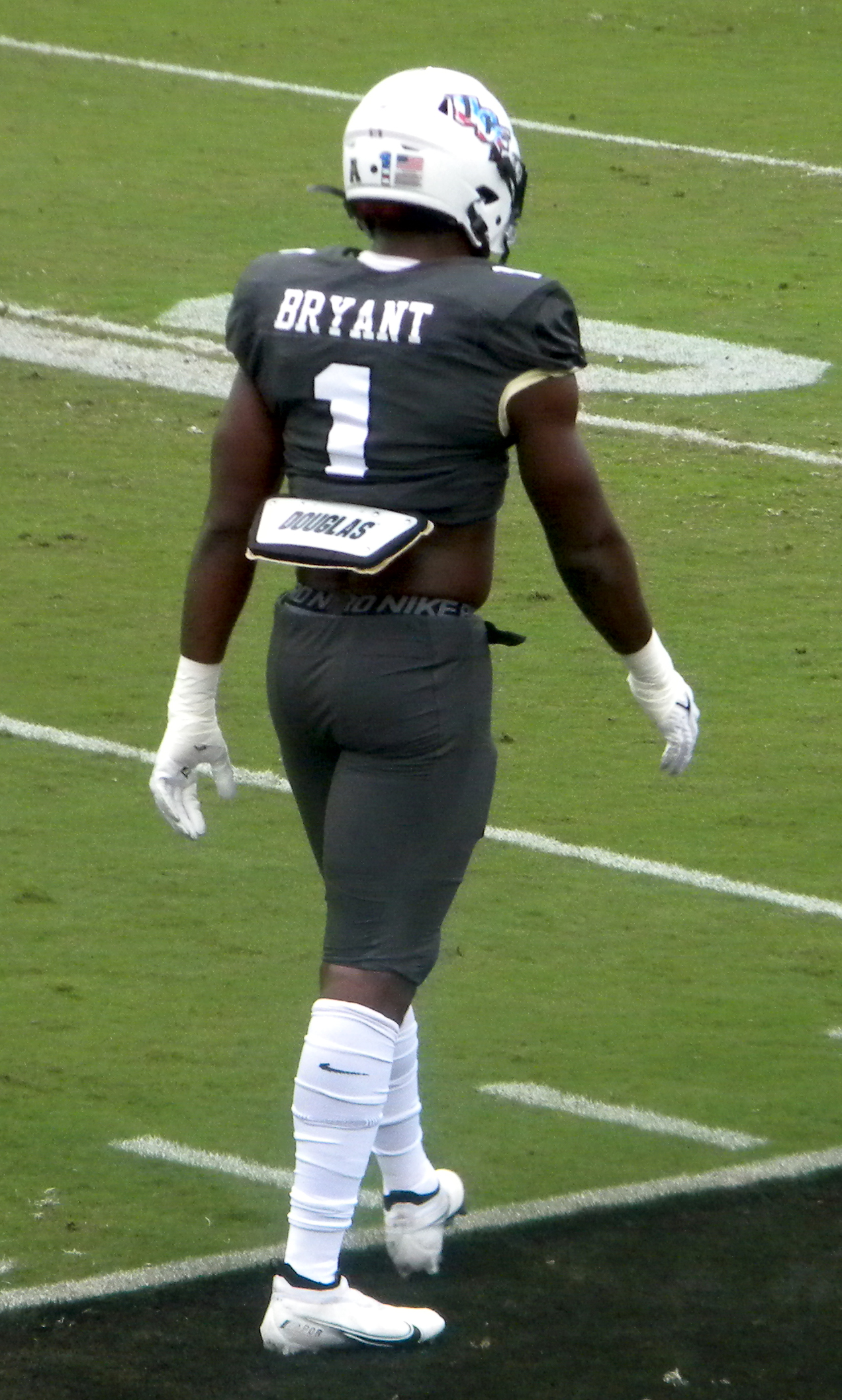
Markaviest "Big Kat" Bryant

2021 UCF Knights Football
Quarterbacks: 7 Joey Gatewood – Jr.; 11 Dillon Gabriel – (redshirt) Jr. (C); 12 Quadry Jones – (redshirt) Jr.; 13 Andrew Brito– (redshirt) Sr.; 14 Parker Navarro – (redshirt) Fr.; 16 Mikey Keene – Fr.; Running backs: 5 Isaiah Bowser – Sr.; 6 Mark-Antony Richards – (redshirt) So.; 20 Anthony Williams – Fr.; 24 Woody Barrett – (redshirt) Sr.; 25 Johnny Richardson – So.; 22 Damarius Good – (redshirt) So.; 33 Trillion Coles – (redshirt) Sr.; 44 R. J. Harvey – (redshirt) So.; Wide receivers: 0 Titus Mokiao-Atimalala – Fr.; 1 Jaylon Robinson – (redshirt) Jr.; 2 Kaedin Robinson – So.; 3 Brandon Johnson – (redshirt) Sr. (C); 4 Ryan O'Keefe – Jr.; 15 Jordan Johnson – (redshirt) Fr.; 17 Amari Johnson – Jr.; 19 Justin Menard – So.; 29 Cade Sams – So.; 31 JaJuan Forte – (redshirt) Jr.; 38 Dionte Marks – (redshirt) So.; 46 Darius Melton – So.; 47 Stephen Martin – (redshirt) Fr.; 80 Nate Craig-Myers – (redshirt) Sr.; 81 Jaylon Griffin – (redshirt) So.; 84 Ke'von Ahmad – Jr.; Tight ends/H-back: 26 Chris Bowerfind – Fr.; 48 Max Paplin – Fr.; 49 Max Holler – (redshirt) Fr.; 82 Alec Holler – (redshirt) Jr.; 83 Garrett French – (redshirt) Fr.; 85 Zach Marsh Wojan – Sr.; 86 Jordan Davis – (redshirt) Fr.; 87 Charlie Browder – Fr.; 88 Jake Hescock – (redshirt) Sr.; 93 Ryan Kaneshiro – (redshirt) Sr.	Offensive Lineman: 50 Patrick Barnett – (redshirt) Fr.; 55 Matthew Lee – (redshirt) So.; 60 Josh McMullen – (redshirt) Sr.; 60 Josh Cox – (redshirt) So.; 65 Cole Schneider – (redshirt) Sr.; 66 Chidoziri Maghiro – (redshirt) Sr.; 68 Marcus Tatum – (redshirt) Sr.; 69 Paul Rubelt – So.; 70 Edward Collins – (redshirt) Jr.; 71 Brett Bell – (redshirt) Sr.; 72 Nate Brady – (redshirt) So.; 73 Samuel Jackson – (redshirt) Sr. (C); 74 Ethan Mort – Fr.; 76 Adrian Medley – (redshirt) So.; 77 Lokahi Pauole – Jr.; Placekickers: 34 Garin Boniol – So.; 45 Ryker Casey – (redshirt) So.; 98 Daniel Obarski – Jr.; Punters: 36 Andrew Osteen – (redshirt) Jr.; 99 Alan Kervin – (redshirt) So.; Long snappers: 32 Alex Ward – (redshirt) Sr.; 93 Joe Rohal – Fr.; 95 Tyler Paul – (redshirt) So.	Defensive Line: 1 Big Kat Bryant – (redshirt) Sr. (C); 5 Ricky Barber – (redshirt) So.; 13 Landon Woodson – (redshirt) Jr.; 22 Kalia Davis – (redshirt) Sr.; 33 Tre'Mon Morris-Brash – Jr.; 40 Kervins Choute – So.; 51 Malachi Lawrence – Fr.; 52 Keenan Hester – (redshirt) So.; 54 Cam Goode – (redshirt) Jr.; 56 Matthew Alexander – Fr.; 58 Dallaz Corbitt – (redshirt) So.; 88 Josh Celiscar – So.; 91 Noah Hancock – (redshirt) Sr.; 92 Austin Camden – (redshirt) Sr.; 94 Anthony Montalvo – (redshirt) Sr.; 96 Trace O'Hara – (redshirt) Fr.; Linebacker: 10 Eriq Gilyard – (redshirt) Jr.; 11 Jeremiah Jean-Baptiste – Jr.; 15 Tatum Bethune – Jr.; 20 Kadeem Leonard – Fr.; 26 Jermaine McMillian – Jr.; 28 Quade Mosier – Jr.; 30 Bryson Armstrong – (redshirt) Sr.; 34 Jon Powell – (redshirt) Sr.; 35 Keenan Cupit – (redshirt) Fr.; 42 Cole Joyce – Fr.; 55 Karlis Bailey-Vice – Fr.; 57 Derek Burns – (redshirt) So.; 90 Hirkley Latu – (redshirt) So.; Defensive back: 0 Marco Domio – Sr.; 7 Davonte Brown – So.; 8 Zamari Maxwell – (redshirt) Sr.; 9 Divaad Wilson – (redshirt) Jr.; 10 William Wells – Fr.; 12 Justin Hodges – So.; 14 Corey Thornton – So.; 17 Emmanuel Appiah-Takyi – (redshirt) Jr.; 17 Trevion Shadrick-Harris – (redshirt) So.; 18 Dyllon Lester – (redshirt) Jr.; 19 Ah'Mare Lee – Fr.; 21 Derek Gainous – Sr.; 23 Jaiden Francois – (redshirt) Fr.; 24 Jarvis Ware – Sr.; 27 Jarrad Baker – (redshirt) So.; 29 Devunte Dawson – (redshirt) Sr.; 31 Brandon Adams – Fr.; 37 Quadric Bullard – So.; 39 Palmer Bachelder – Jr.; 41 Alex Swenson – (redshirt) Sr.; 43 Zach Rodriguez – (redshirt) So.; 46 Philjae Bien-Aime – (redshirt) Fr.; 49 Daniel McCullon – (redshirt) Fr.; Legend: (C) Team captain; (S) Suspended; (I) Ineligible; Injured; Redshirt; Coaching staff: Gus Malzahn – Head Coach; Travis Williams – Defensive coordinator; G. J. Kinne – Co-Offensive coordinator/quarterbacks; David Gibbs – Co-Defensive coordinator/secondary; Tim Harris Jr. – Co-Offensive Coordinator/Running backs; Brian Blackmon – Special teams coordinator/Tight Ends; Herb Hand – Offensive line; Addison Williams – cornerbacks; Darrell Wyatt– Wide receivers; Kenny Ingram – Defensive Ends/Rush; Kenny Martin – Defensive Tackles; Ross Newton – Head Coach Analyst; Darin Hinshaw – Senior Analyst; Kam Moore – Offensive Analyst/RB Asst.; Ben Larson – Special Teams Analyst; Charles Moore – Defensive Analyst; Alex Mathis – Recruiting/High School Relations; Chris Dawson – Director of Sports Performance; Andrew Shirek – Asst. Dir. of Sports Performance; Corey Meredith – Asst. Dir. of Sports Performance; Miguel Carodine – Asst. Dir. of Sports Performance; SJ Touhy – Dir. of FB Operations/Chief of Staff; → Roster updated October 30, 2023

== Awards and milestones ==
=== School records ===
- Most consecutive games scoring both a rushing touchdown and a passing touchdown: 53
- Most wins all-time in American Athletic Conference intra-conference games: 53 (ongoing; AAC record, includes two wins in AAC Championship Game)

=== American Athletic Conference honors ===
==== American Athletic Conference All-Conference First Team ====
- Markaviest "Big Kat" Bryant, DE

==== American Athletic Conference All-Conference Second Team ====
- Ryan O'Keefe, WR
- Lokahi Pauole, RG
- Divaad Wilson, DB

==== American Athletic Conference All-Conference Honorable mention ====
- Marcus Tatum, LT
- Cole Schnieder, LG
- Tatum Bethune, LB

==== Defensive Player of the Week ====
- September 6: Kalia Davis
- October 11 Tatum Bethune

=== National awards and honors ===
- Patrick Mannelly Award finalist — Alex Ward
