= 2021 Gasparilla Bowl =

Postseason college football bowl game

2021 Union Home Mortgage Gasparilla Bowl
- 13th Gasparilla Bowl
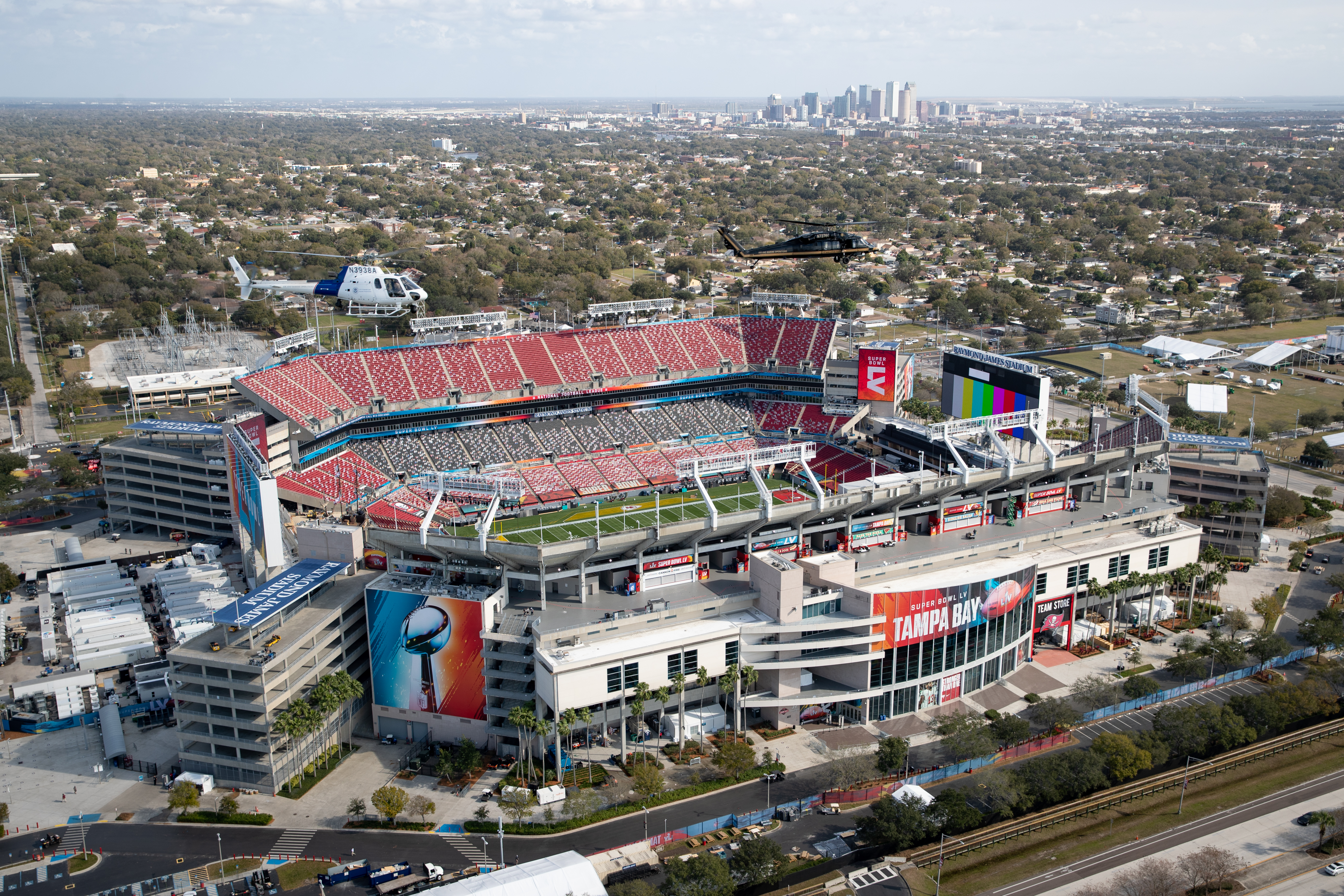
- Raymond James Stadium in Tampa, Florida, the site of the Gasparilla Bowl.
| UCF Knights | Florida Gators |
| (8–4) | (6–6) |
| The American | SEC |
| 29 | 17 |
| Head coach: Gus Malzahn | Head coach: Greg Knox (interim) |
| | 1 | 2 | 3 | 4 | Total |
|---|---|---|---|---|---|
| UCF | 0 | 9 | 17 | 3 | 29 |
| Florida | 7 | 3 | 7 | 0 | 17 |
- Date: December 23, 2021
- Season: 2021
- Stadium: Raymond James Stadium
- Location: Tampa, Florida
- MVP: Ryan O'Keefe (WR, UCF)
- Favorite: Florida by 7.5
- Referee: Mark Duddy (Pac-12)
- Attendance: 63,669

United States TV coverage
- Network: ESPN
- Announcers: Wes Durham (play-by-play), Roddy Jones (analyst), and Taylor Davis (sideline)
- Nielsen ratings: 1.8

International TV coverage
- Network: ESPN Brazil
- Announcers: Matheus Pinheiro (play-by-play) and Weinny Eirado (analyst)

The 2021 Gasparilla Bowl was a college football bowl game played on December 23, 2021, with kickoff at 7:00 p.m. EST, televised on ESPN. It was the 13th edition of the Gasparilla Bowl (after the 2020 edition was cancelled due to the COVID-19 pandemic), and was one of the 2021–22 bowl games concluding the 2021 FBS football season. Sponsored by mortgage loan company Union Home Mortgage, the game was officially known as the Union Home Mortgage Gasparilla Bowl.

On December 10, 2021, the game was officially announced as a sellout, the first time the Gasparilla Bowl sold out in its history.

== Teams ==
Consistent with conference tie-ins, the game was played between teams from the American Athletic Conference (AAC or "The American") and the Southeastern Conference (SEC). The bowl also has a tie-in with the Atlantic Coast Conference (ACC).

This was the third meeting all-time between UCF and Florida. The Gators won both previous meetings, both held at Ben Hill Griffin Stadium, by the scores of 58–27 in 1999, then 42–0 in 2006.

=== UCF Knights ===
The Knights started out the season 2–0 under first-year head coach Gus Malzahn, however, the season was nearly derailed after the team suffered a rash of injuries during a last-minute loss at Louisville. Quarterback Dillon Gabriel suffered a season-ending broken clavicle, and by season's end, elected to enter the NCAA's transfer portal. Freshman Mikey Keene took over as starting quarterback, winning six of his nine starts, leading the Knights to an 8–4 record regular season (third place in the AAC) and a 7–0 record at home. UCF suffered many injuries throughout the season and some opt outs in the bowl game. From the starting lineups, media reported a total of 27 missing starters or rotational players that were shuffled out. Notably key players out included Kalia Davis (Defensive tackle), Bentavius Thompson (running back), Jarvis Ware (defensive back), Corey Thornton (center), leading tackler Bryson Armstrong along with Eriq Gilyard (linebackers), wide receivers Jaylon Robinson and Kevon Ahmad, along with several others. Running back Isaiah Bowser was still recovering from a prior injury but decided to play in the bowl game anyway.

=== Florida Gators ===
The Gators finished 6–6 (2–6 in the SEC), becoming bowl eligible in the final week of the regular season by defeating in-state rival Florida State. Fourth year head coach Dan Mullen was fired on November 21, after a disappointing 5–6 start. Greg Knox took over as interim head coach to finish out the season before Billy Napier takes over in 2022. Defensive lineman Zachary Carter announced that he would opting out of the game, while quarterback Anthony Richardson (who played in six games) would miss the game due to an injury resulting in surgery. Starting quarterback Emory Jones announced a week prior to the game that he was entering the NCAA transfer portal, but would stay with team through the bowl game.

== Game summary ==
=== First quarter ===
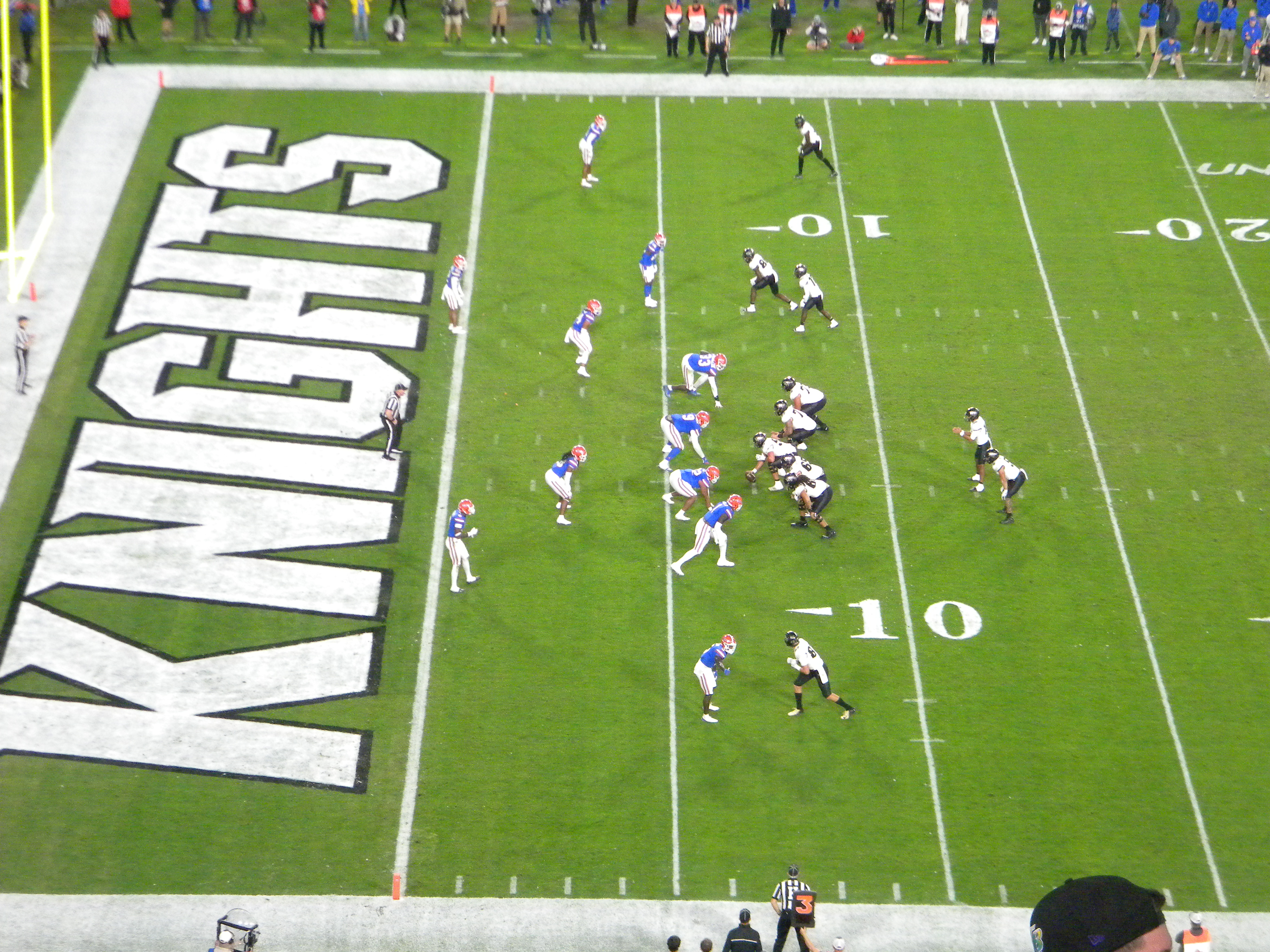
UCF in the red zone during the 2021 Gasparilla Bowl

Florida won the coin toss and elected to receive. Both teams started out slowly, punting on each of their first two drives. At the 6:37 mark of the first quarter, Florida drove into UCF territory. Facing a 4th & 5 at the 27 yard line, the Gators went for it on fourth down. The UCF defense forced an incomplete pass, and a turnover on downs. The Gators put the first points on the board with an 8-play, 58 yard touchdown drive. Dameon Pierce's 1-yard touchdown run gave the Gators a 7–0 lead. Then with less than a minute left in the first quarter, Johnny Richardson broke free for a 38-yard gain to the Florida 34.

=== Second quarter ===
Two plays into the second quarter, the Knights faced a 4th & 5 at the Florida 29 yard line. Quarterback Mikey Keene's quick pass to Nate Craig-Meyers got the first down, and kept the drive alive. Isaiah Bowser's 3-yard touchdown run subsequently the Knights on the board. UCF elected to go for two, but Andrew Brito's pass to Jake Hescock fell incomplete, and the Gators held a 7–6 lead.

Emory Jones drove the Gators down the field, but a penalty helped stall the drive. The Gators kicking woes came to light when Chris Howard ended the drive with a missed a 34-yard field goal attempt. UCF took over after the missed field goal with good field position. At the Gators 41, Keen pitched a reverse to Ryan O'Keefe, who broke free for a 34-yard gain down to the 7 yard line. The Gators defense, however, held the Knights to a field goal attempt. Daniel Obarski's 34-yard field goal gave the Knights a 9–7 lead. The Gators managed a field goal in the final two minutes, and took a 10–9 into halftime.

=== Third quarter ===
UCF received the ball to start the second half. Chris Howard's kickoff went out of bounds, giving the Knights the ball at the 35 yard line. On the first play of the third quarter, Isaiah Bowser broke free for a big gain down the Florida 29. The drive came up empty, however after a missed field goal attempt. The Gators went three-and-out on their first drive of the second half, punting the ball to the Knights, who took over at their own 21 yard line. On the second play of the drive, Keene pitched another reverse to Ryan O'Keefe, who for the second time ran free for a huge gain. This time tight roping down the sidelines for 74 yards to the Gators 4 yard line. Boswer punched the ball in on the next play for a touchdown, and a 16–10 UCF lead. After the play, an unsportsmanlike conduct penalty on the Gators assessed a 15-yard penalty on the subsequent kickoff, and Ty'Ron Hopper was ejected. Daniel Obarski's squib kickoff was fumbled by the Gators, but the Gators recovered and maintained possession.

Emory Jones moved the Gators down the field with a quick 20-yard pass to Rick Wells, followed by a 32 yard run by Malik Davis. The drive was capped off with a 19-yard touchdown run by Davis. The Gators took a 17–16 lead with just under 8 minutes left in the third quarter. An unsportsmanlike conduct penalty on UCF was assessed on the kickoff, and just like before, a squib onside kick almost resulted in a recovery by the kicking team. The Knights started the drive at the Florida 41. Back-to-back penalties on the Gators (Taunting and Roughing the passer) advanced the Knights 30 yards. A mix of short passes and runs, got the Knights to the 4 line. Obarski kicked a chip-shot field goal, and the Knights took a 19–17 lead.

The Gators were held to a three-and-out. Jones missed a wide-open Justin Shorter, who might have reached the endzone in stride. Instead, a short punt set the Knights up at their own 46. Striking fast, on the first play of the drive, Keene hit Ryan O'Keefe for a 54-yard catch and run touchdown. The Knights extended their lead to 26–17 to start the fourth quarter.

=== Fourth quarter ===
The Knights wore down a tired Gators defense in the fourth quarter. Isaiah Bowser finished the night with 35 carries for 155 yards (two touchdown runs). The Knights took time off the clock, and tacked on a field goal, and the final score was 29–17. Ryan O'Keefe was named the most valuable player, with 110 yards receiving and 85 yards on the ground. O'Keefe dedicated his performance to former teammate Otis Anderson's memory.

A scary moment occurred with just over two minutes left in the game when Gators wide receiver Justin Shorter went up to catch a pass, but collided with Quadric Bullard. Shorter fell to the ground, snapping his head back, and lay motionless on the field for several minutes. Shorter was transported to a local hospital, and was released the following day.

2021 Union Home Mortgage Gasparilla Bowl

| Quarter | 1 | 2 | 3 | 4 | Total |
|---|---|---|---|---|---|
| UCF | 0 | 9 | 17 | 3 | 29 |
| Florida | 7 | 3 | 7 | 0 | 17 |

at Raymond James Stadium • Tampa, Florida

- Date: Thursday, December 23, 2021
- Game time: 7:00 p.m. EST
- Game weather: Sunny • Temperature: 57 °F (14 °C) • Wind: 3 mph (4.8 km/h) SE
- Game attendance: 63,669
- TV announcers (ESPN): Wes Durham (play-by-play), Roddy Jones (analyst), and Taylor Davis (sideline)
- Box score

Game information

First quarter

- FLA 1:22 – Dameon Pierce 2-yard run, Chris Howard kick good. Drive: 8 plays, 58 yards, 3:50. Florida 7–0

Second quarter

- 12:29 UCF – Isaiah Bowser 3-yard run, two-point conversion failed. Drive: 10 plays, 74 yards, 3:53. Florida 7–6
- 6:16 UCF – Daniel Obarski 34-yard field goal. Drive: 9 plays, 49 yards, 4:08. UCF 9–7
- 1:36 FLA – Chris Howard 26-yard field goal. Drive: 12 plays, 64 yards, 4:40. Florida 10–9

Third quarter

- 10:00 UCF – Isaiah Bowser 4-yard run, Daniel Obarski kick good. Drive: 3 plays, 79 yards, 1:05. UCF 16–10
- 7:57 FLA – Malik Davis 19-yard run, Chris Howard kick good. Drive: 6 plays, 82 yards, 2:03. Florida 17–16
- 3:04 UCF – Daniel Obarski 21-yard field goal. Drive: 12 plays, 55 yards, 4:53. UCF 19–17
- 1:08 UCF – Ryan O'Keefe 54-yard pass from Mikey Keene, Daniel Obarski kick good. Drive: 1 play, 54 yards, 0:08. UCF 26–17

Fourth quarter

- 2:41 UCF – Daniel Obarski 33-yard field goal. Drive: 9 plays, 57 yards, 5:16. UCF 29–17

=== Statistics ===
| Statistics | UCF | FLA |
|---|---|---|
| First downs | 20 | 19 |
| Plays–yards | 75–436 | 67–376 |
| Rushes–yards | 50–288 | 30–205 |
| Passing yards | 148 | 171 |
| Passing: comp–att–int | 15–25–0 | 14–37–0 |
| Time of possession | 34:30 | 25:30 |

| Team | Category | Player | Statistics |
|---|---|---|---|
| UCF | Passing | Mikey Keene | 14/22, 144 yard, 1 TD |
| UCF | Rushing | Isaiah Bowser | 35 carries, 155 yards, 2 TD |
| UCF | Receiving | Ryan O'Keefe | 7 receptions, 85 yards, 1 TD |
| Florida | Passing | Emory Jones | 14/36, 171 yards |
| Florida | Rushing | Malik Davis | 7 carries, 86 yards, 1 TD |
| Florida | Receiving | Justin Shorter | 3 receptions, 54 yards |

== Significance ==
UCF's win over Florida in 2021 marked the program's first-ever victory over the Gators in football. The night after the victory UCF's Twitter page declared the win as a "Sunshine STATEment." The win gave UCF sole claim to being the best college football team in the state of Florida, a title many debated. To this day, the 2021 Gasparilla Bowl is the only edition of the bowl to be sold out.
