= 2014 St. Petersburg Bowl =

2014 Bitcoin St. Petersburg Bowl
- 7th St. Petersburg Bowl
NC State Wolfpack	UCF Knights
(7–5)	(9–3)
ACC	The American
34	27
Head coach: Dave Doeren	Head coach: George O'Leary
	1	2	3	4	Total
NC State	7	10	14	3	34
UCF	3	7	3	14	27
- Date: December 26, 2014
- Season: 2014
- Stadium: Tropicana Field
- Location: St. Petersburg, Florida
- MVP: NC State QB Jacoby Brissett
- Favorite: UCF by 2
- National anthem: Carolyn Malachi
- Referee: Don Willard (MAC)
- Attendance: 26,675
- Payout: US$537,500

United States TV coverage
- Network: ESPN/ESPN Radio
- Announcers: Adam Amin, John Congemi, and Kaylee Hartung (ESPN); Dave LaMont, Anthony Becht, and Cara Capuano (ESPN Radio)

The 2014 St. Petersburg Bowl, the seventh edition of the annual game, was a college football bowl game that was played on December 26, 2014 at Tropicana Field in St. Petersburg, Florida. The game matched the NC State Wolfpack of the Atlantic Coast Conference against the American Athletic Conference co-champion UCF Knights. The game began at 8:00 p.m. EST and aired on ESPN. It was one of the 2014–15 bowl games concluding the 2014 FBS football season. The Wolfpack defeated the Knights, 34–27.

After four playings named after the Beef O'Brady's restaurant franchise, the bowl reverted to its original name, the St. Petersburg Bowl. Sponsored by online payment processor BitPay, the game was officially known as the Bitcoin St. Petersburg Bowl.

== Teams ==
The game featured the NC State Wolfpack of the Atlantic Coast Conference and the American Athletic Conference co-champion UCF Knights.

The game represented be the third overall meeting between these two teams, with the series previously tied 1–1. The last time these two teams met was in 2010.

=== NC State Wolfpack ===
After finishing their regular season with a 7–5 record, the Wolfpack accepted their invitation to play in the game.

This game was NC State's first St. Petersburg Bowl.

=== UCF Knights ===
After finishing their regular season with a 9–3 record and winning a share of the American Athletic Conference championship, the Knights accepted their invitation to play in the game.

The game was UCF's third St. Petersburg Bowl, extending their record for most appearances in the game. The Knights previously lost the 2009 game to the Rutgers Scarlet Knights by a score of 45–24, and they later won the 2012 Beef 'O' Brady's Bowl over the Ball State Cardinals by a score of 38–17.

== Pregame buildup ==
=== NC State ===
==== Offense ====
The Wolfpack's offense focused on rushing the football, averaging 206 rushing yards per game, which ranked fourth in their conference; nevertheless, they were average in other areas, and were expected to struggle against UCF's stout defense. The unit was piloted by dual-threat quarterback Jacoby Brissett, who excelled at game management and keeping the offense moving by avoiding turnovers. A trio of running backs made substantial contributions to the rushing attack along with Brissett – Shadrach Thornton led the team with 811 yards and a 5.5 yards-per-carry average (ypc), Matt Dayes compiled 495 yards on 91 carries (5.4 ypc), and Tony Creecy compiled 282 yards on 52 carries (5.4 ypc). Freshman Bo Hines led an inexperienced receiving corps with 42 receptions for 537 yards, while tight end David Grinnage was second in receiving, and led the team with receiving five touchdowns. The offensive line entered the season with "three returning players with starting experience: center Luke Lathan and guard Kalani Heppe and Curtis Crouch. He also has two inexperienced tackles and an overall lack of experience and depth," and ultimately, not a single member of the line earned even honorable mention all-conference accolades. Punter Will Baumann was a first team all-conference honoree.

== Game summary ==
=== Scoring summary ===
Scoring summary

Quarter	Time	Drive			Team	Scoring information	Score	
Quarter	Time	Plays	Yards	TOP	Team	Scoring information	NCSU	UCF
1	10:06	12	52	4:54	UCF	40-yard field goal by Shawn Moffitt	0	3
1	6:11	9	75	3:55	NCST	Jaylen Samuels 18-yard touchdown reception from Shadrach Thornton, Niklas Sade kick good	7	3
2	12:34	10	67	3:25	UCF	Josh Reese 6-yard touchdown reception from Justin Holman, Shawn Moffitt kick good	7	10
2	9:05	8	78	3:29	NCST	Johnathan Alston 37-yard touchdown reception from Jacoby Brissett, Niklas Sade kick good	14	10
2	3:16	9	74	4:52	NCST	19-yard field goal by Niklas Sade	17	10
3	11:55	9	75	3:05	NCST	Matt Dayes 24-yard touchdown run, Niklas Sade kick good	24	10
3	5:45	8	15	3:03	UCF	36-yard field goal by Shawn Moffitt	24	13
3	3:05	7	75	2:40	NCST	Matt Dayes 15-yard touchdown run, Niklas Sade kick good	31	13
4	12:37	5	23	1:29	NCST	45-yard field goal by Niklas Sade	34	13
4	11:01	5	75	1:36	UCF	Josh Reese 14-yard touchdown reception from Justin Holman, Shawn Moffitt kick good	34	20
4	1:44	10	70	1:12	UCF	Josh Reese 2-yard touchdown reception from Justin Holman, Shawn Moffitt kick good	34	27
"TOP" = time of possession. For other American football terms, see Glossary of American football.							34	27

=== Statistics ===
Statistics	NCSU	UCF
First downs	26	21
Plays–yards	66–487	51–373
Rushes–yards	49–187	28–82
Passing yards	300	291
Passing: Comp–Att–Int	17–28–0	23–53–1
Time of possession	33:51	26:09
