= BitPay =

Bitcoin payment service provider

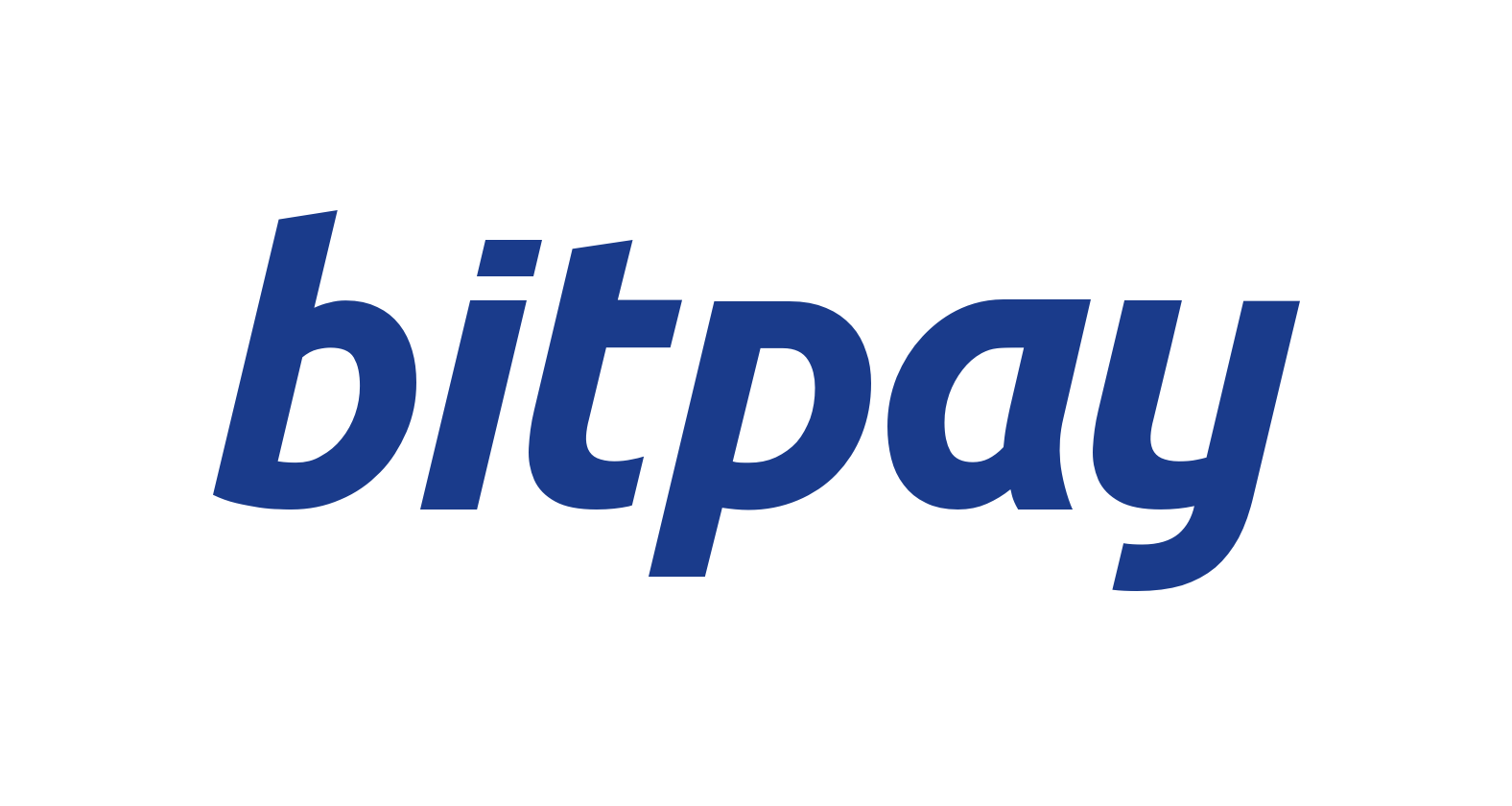
- Headquarters: Atlanta, Georgia, USA, United States, Argentina, Netherlands
- No. of locations: 3
- Area served: Worldwide
- CEO: Stephen Pair
- Industry: Payment Processor
- Employees: 51-200
- Website: Official website
- Launched: May 2011; 15 years ago

BitPay is a cryptocurrency payment service provider headquartered in Atlanta, Georgia, United States. It was founded in May 2011 by Tony Gallippi and Stephen Pair. BitPay provides crypto payment processing services for merchants and a cryptocurrency wallet available on mobile and desktop.

== History ==
BitPay was founded in 2011 to provide mobile checkout services to companies that wanted to accept bitcoins. By October 2012, BitPay had grown to having 1,100 active merchants, including being WordPress's bitcoin merchant.

BitPay announced in January 2013 that they would be relocating their headquarters to Atlanta, Georgia, from their previous location, Orlando, Florida. The move came following the announcement the company had secured $510,000 in seed funding. According to the company's co-founder, the city of Atlanta was chosen due to the number of fintech companies located in Georgia.

In May 2013, BitPay announced that they had raised $2 million via Founders Fund.

In September 2013, the company announced it had reached the milestone of 10,000 merchants. Gallippi stated that since the foundation of the company, they had processed over $34m, which was equivalent to 270,830 bitcoins at the time on the Bitcoin Price Index.

In 2014, BitPay expanded its North American presence beyond its headquarters in Atlanta, opening offices in New York City, San Francisco and St. Petersburg, Florida. BitPay's European headquarters opened in Amsterdam and their South American Headquarters were opened in Argentina.

In January at CES 2014, BitPay announced that 12,000 merchants had signed up to their service. The D Las Vegas and Golden Gate Hotel and Casino both announced that BitPay would be used as their chosen merchant for bitcoin in Las Vegas. They were two of the first casinos in Las Vegas to accept bitcoin.

Shortly after CES 2014, the NBA basketball team the Sacramento Kings announced they would become the first major sports franchise in North America to accept bitcoin as a form of payment for tickets and merchandise and would be processed by BitPay.

Within the same month, it was announced that Zynga would also begin to accept bitcoin, with BitPay as its merchant.

In 2014, BitPay merchant BitGive became the first bitcoin charity to be recognized as a charitable organization by the IRS and was granted 501(c)(3) status. The 2014 FEC ruling that bitcoin donations can be accepted by political campaigns and organizations led to BitPay partnering with CoinVox and other fundraising organizations. In June, BitPay became the first bitcoin company to sponsor a North American sports event. They sponsored the St. Petersburg Bowl, a college bowl game. Following the announcement, over 100 companies in the St. Petersburg area took steps so that they could accept the digital currency before the first event.

In September 2015, the company sued its insurance provider in regards to non-coverage of a 5000 BTC theft that occurred in December 2014.

In May 2016, BitPay launched the BitPay Visa Prepaid Debit Card, the first prepaid Visa debit card available for bitcoin users in all 50 US states. The company also added new bitcoin-accepting firms, including gaming platform Steam. New collaborations and releases with Intel and Microsoft's Azure Cloud platform brought new features and capabilities to BitPay's Copay and Bitcore open source platforms.

In 2017, BitPay launched another round B funding campaign. Later that year, they raised the minimum payment on the platform to US $100 from its previous US $5; the change was reversed only a few days later. Additionally, BitPay began supporting Bitcoin Cash. In Dec 2017, Steam stopped accepting bitcoin payments from BitPay, citing transaction costs for small items were too high, along with volatility concerns.

Bitcoin's prepaid WaveCrest Visa was discontinued in January 2018. BitPay received its virtual currency license from the New York Department of Financial Services in July 2018.

In 2021 AMC Theatres, Gucci, and TAG Heuer began allowing customers to make payments via BitPay.

== Funding ==
Initial funding came from sources including Shakil Khan, Barry Silbert, Jimmy Furland, Roger Ver, and Trace Mayer.

In January 2013, the company announced US $510,000 in angel investment, its first external capital after being internally bootstrapped. The investment coincided with the company relocating their headquarters to Atlanta, Georgia. It was stated at the time that the funding would be used to help advance bitcoin processing.

In June 2013, BitPay received an additional US $2 million venture capital investment led by the Founders Fund. A Tech Crunch article stated that the investment would likely be spent on staffing, with a number of coding specialists required around that time. The funding was seen as an attempted push to become more global and was seen by some as a larger VC land grab for bitcoin companies.

In December 2013, Hong Kong business magnate Li Ka-shing invested through his Horizons Ventures firm about $2.7 million into BitPay.

In May 2014, BitPay received $30 million in funding from investors including Index Ventures, RRE Ventures, Virgin Group's Richard Branson and Yahoo founder Jerry Yang.

== See also ==
- Coinbase
- Xapo
- Blockchain
- Circle (company)
- List of bitcoin companies
