= Beef O'Brady's =

American restaurant franchise

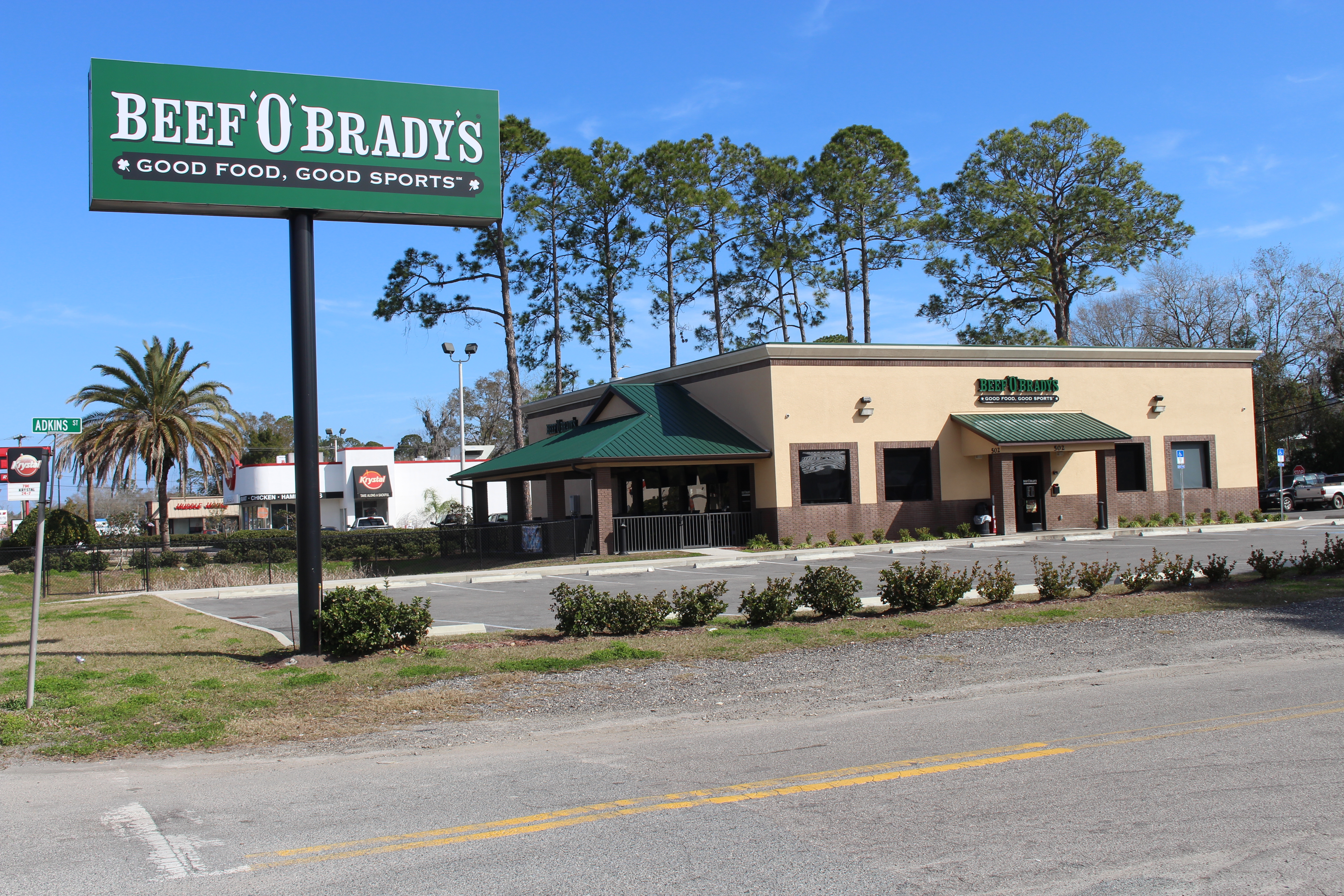
- Beef O'Brady's in Starke, Florida
- Company type: Private
- Industry: Restaurants Franchising
- Founded: 1985; 41 years ago in Brandon, Florida
- Founder: Jim Mellody
- Headquarters: Tampa, Florida, United States
- Number of locations: 151 (2019)
- Area served: United States
- Key people: RJ Del Rio (CEO)
- Owner: Family Sports Concepts Inc.
- Website: www.beefobradys.com

Beef O'Brady's (styled as Beef 'O' Brady's Family Sports Restaurant) is an American restaurant franchise, established in 1985 by Jim Mellody in Brandon, Florida, and headquartered in Tampa.

== History ==
Jim Mellody moved from his native Pennsylvania to Florida in 1971, and tried numerous restaurant ideas before hitting on the concept of a family-friendly Irish pub (serving no hard liquor). He founded Beef O'Brady's in 1985. In 1998, Mellody sold most of his interest to Family Sports Concepts Inc., headed by Chuck Winship, but retained an interest in 13 locations. Franchising started in 1998, and by August 2000, it had grown to 40 locations.

When Mellody died in November 2002, the chain had grown to 88 locations within seven southeastern states. After Mellody's death, what had been his remaining interest in the company was bought out, and by December 2005 there were 183 locations in 19 states. As of 2009, Mellody's daughter still ran the original Brandon location.

In early 2010, CEO Chuck Winship retired and was replaced by Chris Elliott, a former executive of Cinnabon and Church's Chicken; at that time, the company had approximately 245 locations, down from a high of approximately 270. As of September 2019, the number of locations had dropped to 150, with 26 of those company-owned and operated.

=== Bowl game sponsorship 2009–2013 ===
In 2009, the company became the title sponsor of the St. Petersburg Bowl, an annual college football bowl game held at Tropicana Field in St. Petersburg, Florida. That year's game was officially named the "St. Petersburg Bowl presented by Beef 'O' Brady's". The game was then renamed as the "Beef 'O' Brady's Bowl" for four years (2010–2013). In 2014, the game reverted to one of its former names, and in 2017 became the Gasparilla Bowl once again. (It was originally called the MagicJack Bowl prior to that.)

== See also ==
- List of Irish restaurants
