= Union Home Mortgage =

American mortgage loan company

- Company type: Private
- Industry: Mortgage Lending
- Founded: 1970
- Headquarters: Strongsville, Ohio, U.S.
- Key people: Bill Cosgrove (President/CEO)
- Website: www.unionhomemortgage.com

Union Home Mortgage is an American mortgage loan company based in Strongsville, Ohio. Founded in 1970, the company reports that it operates in 44 states plus Washington, D.C., with over $5 billion in annual lending volume. The company also reports that it has been named to the Inc. 500 list of fastest growing companies in America four times (2016–2019).

In October 2020, the company signed on as title sponsor of the Gasparilla Bowl, an annual college football bowl game played in the Tampa Bay area.
