= Corey Thornton =

American football player (born 2001)

No. 31 – Carolina Panthers
- Position: Cornerback
- Roster status: Practice squad

Personal information
- Born: January 30, 2001 (age 25)
- Listed height: 6 ft 1 in (1.85 m)
- Listed weight: 204 lb (93 kg)

Career information
- High school: Booker T. Washington (Miami, Florida)
- College: UCF (2020–2023); Louisville (2024)
- NFL draft: 2025: undrafted

Career history
- Carolina Panthers (2025–present)

Career NFL statistics as of Week 9, 2026
- Total tackles: 18
- Forced fumbles: 1
- Interceptions: 1
- Pass deflections: 6
- Stats at Pro Football Reference

Corey Thornton (born January 30, 2001) is an American professional football cornerback for the Carolina Panthers of the National Football League (NFL). He played college football for the UCF Knights and Louisville Cardinals and was signed by the Panthers as an undrafted free agent in 2025.

== Early life ==
Thornton is from Miami, Florida. He attended Booker T. Washington Senior High School in Miami where he played football, helping them win the state 4A championship in 2019. A three-star recruit, he committed to play college football for the UCF Knights.

As a freshman at UCF in 2020, Thornton started all 10 games at cornerback and recorded 30 tackles and an interception. He then appeared in 12 games, recording 32 tackles, 2.5 tackles-for-loss and six pass breakups in 2021. In 2022, he played in 14 games and finished with 50 tackles and a team-leading seven pass breakups; he was named third-team All-American Athletic Conference (AAC) by Pro Football Focus (PFF) both years. He then totaled 27 tackles, three interceptions and nine pass breakups during the 2023 season, before announcing a transfer to the Louisville Cardinals for his final year in 2024. With the Cardinals, Thornton started 13 games and made 38 tackles, two interceptions and nine pass breakups, being named honorable mention All-Atlantic Coast Conference (ACC). In 60 games played at UCF and Louisville, he finished with 177 tackles, six interceptions and 33 pass breakups. At the conclusion of his collegiate career, he was invited to the East–West Shrine Bowl.

== Professional career ==
Pre-draft measurables
Height	Weight	Arm length	Hand span	Wingspan	40-yard dash	10-yard split	20-yard split	20-yard shuttle	Three-cone drill	Vertical jump	Broad jump	Bench press
6 ft 0 1/2 in (1.84 m)	193 lb (88 kg)	32 1/2 in (0.83 m)	9 3/8 in (0.24 m)	6 ft 7 1/8 in (2.01 m)	4.62 s	1.57 s	2.56 s	4.29 s	7.21 s	32.5 in (0.83 m)	10 ft 2 in (3.10 m)	9 reps
All values from Pro Day

After going unselected in the 2025 NFL draft, Thornton signed with the Carolina Panthers as an undrafted free agent. After impressing in preseason, he made the team's 53-man roster for the 2025 season. Thornton suffered a broken fibula in Week 12 against the San Francisco 49ers, and was placed on injured reserve on November 26, 2025.

On August 30, 2026, Thornton was waived by the Panthers as a part of final roster cuts; he was re–signed to the team's practice squad the next day.
