= Josh Reese =

American football player (born 1991)

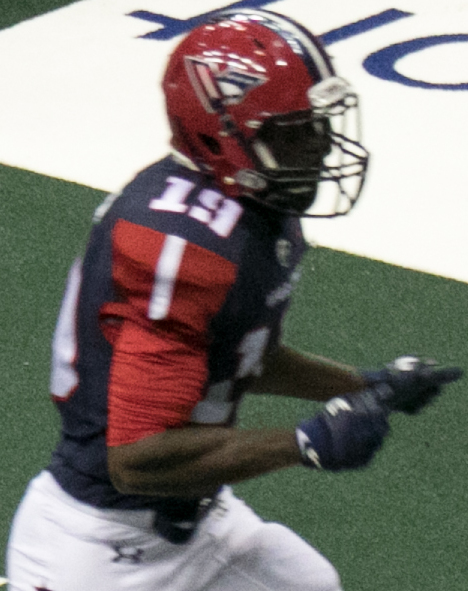
- Reese with the Washington Valor in 2017

No. 19
- Position: Wide receiver

Personal information
- Born: January 3, 1991 (age 35); Miami, Florida, U.S.
- Listed height: 6 ft 0 in (1.83 m)
- Listed weight: 184 lb (83 kg)

Career information
- High school: Miami Central (West Little River, Florida)
- College: UCF
- NFL draft: 2015: undrafted

Career history
- Tampa Bay Buccaneers (2015)*; Philadelphia Eagles (2015)*; Washington Valor (2017–2019)
- * Offseason or practice squad member only

Awards and highlights
- ArenaBowl champion (2018)

Career AFL statistics
- Receptions: 129
- Receiving yards: 1,708
- Receiving touchdowns: 24
- Total tackles: 22.5
- Passing touchdowns: 1
- Stats at ArenaFan.com

Josh Reese (born January 3, 1991) is an American former professional football wide receiver. He played college football at UCF.

== Professional career ==
=== Tampa Bay Buccaneers ===
Reese was signed as an undrafted rookie on May 5, 2015. He was later cut in rookie minicamp on May 11, 2015.

=== Philadelphia Eagles ===
Reese was signed as a rookie free agent on August 4, 2015.

=== Washington Valor ===
Reese was assigned to the Washington Valor. On May 24, 2017, Reese was activated by the Valor. On June 29, 2017, Reese was placed on reassignment. On July 8, 2017, Reese was assigned to the Valor.
