= Roughing the passer =

Penalty in gridiron football

In gridiron football, roughing the passer is a foul in which a defensive player makes illegal contact with the quarterback after the latter has thrown a forward pass. The penalty is 10 or 15 yards (for the NFL it is 15 yards), depending on the league, an automatic first down for the offense, and a disqualification if flagrant. Defenders are allowed to contact a player attempting a forward pass while he still has possession of the ball (e.g., a quarterback sack); however, once the ball is released, defenders are not allowed to make contact with the quarterback unless by the result of momentum. Judgment over whether contact following release was the result of a violation or momentum is made by the referee on a case-by-case basis.

Roughing the passer can also be called if the defender commits intimidating acts toward the passer, such as picking him up and stuffing him into the ground, or wrestling with him. It can also be called if the player who tackles the passer makes helmet to helmet contact, or lands with the full weight of his body on the passer. If the defender makes helmet-to-helmet contact or lands with his full body weight on the passer, the foul may be called even if the quarterback still has the ball at the time of the hit, although this is less common.

An exception to the rule is where the passer rejoins a play after throwing the ball, such as in an attempt to block, recover a fumble, or tackle a defensive player who has gained possession of the ball. In this case, the passer is treated as any other player and may legally be contacted. Roughing the passer also does not apply to lateral passes or backward passes.

== Justification ==
The NFL restricts roughing the passer in an effort to protect its quarterbacks. It also places an emphasis on unnecessary and flagrant roughness while sacks are taking place, even if the ball is not in the air. Any strong slamming motion or head hits on the quarterback will result in a roughing the passer penalty.

== Controversy ==
As the quarterback position is the most glorified and sought after position in football, the league has a history of overprotecting their quarterbacks. This is seen with notable season ending injuries like Carson Palmer in a 2005 playoff game against the Steelers, as well as Tom Brady's season ending ACL tear in his season opener by Chiefs safety Bernard Pollard in 2008.

=== Clay Matthews penalties ===
Prior to the 2018 NFL season, the NFL indicated that it would begin to increase enforcement of the roughing the passer penalty on defenders that make certain types of unnecessarily forcible contact with the quarterback. Such acts include unnecessary driving of the quarterback into the ground and contact that violates the body weight provision of the roughing the passer rule, which states that a defender that lands on the quarterback with his full body weight will be penalized for roughing the passer, regardless of whether the quarterback has released the football.

As a result of these changes to the enforcement of the rule, infractions for roughing the passer increased during the first weeks of the 2018 season. Most notably, Clay Matthews III, then-linebacker for the Green Bay Packers, was flagged for roughing the passer three times in the Packers' first three games of the season. In the final minutes of the fourth quarter of a Week 2 game against the rival Minnesota Vikings, Matthews was deemed to have unnecessarily driven quarterback Kirk Cousins into the ground as Cousins threw an interception that would have likely won the game for Green Bay. The penalty nullified the interception, and the Vikings subsequently scored the tying touchdown and two-point conversion in a game that eventually ended in a tie. During the team's next game against Washington in Week 3, Matthews landed with his full body weight on quarterback Alex Smith and was penalized for the act.

The aforementioned penalties on Matthews sparked criticism from NFL viewers, players, coaches, and former NFL officiating chiefs Mike Pereira and Dean Blandino. In the aftermath of said infractions, some argued that penalizing acts such as driving quarterbacks into the ground and landing with full body weight on quarterbacks has made it exceptionally difficult for defenders to perform their jobs. Others commented that Matthews got penalized for an inability to defy physics to argue against penalizing defenders such as Matthews for factors out of their control.

=== Tua Tagovailoa concussion and subsequent penalties ===
During the 2022 NFL season, the league's roughing the passer rules were once called into question in the aftermath of a concussion to Miami Dolphins quarterback Tua Tagovailoa during a Week 4 Thursday Night Football game against the Cincinnati Bengals. Just four days after being suspected of suffering a concussion during a game against the Buffalo Bills, Tagovailoa suffered a concussion when he got swung to the ground by Cincinnati nose tackle Josh Tupou. Tagovailoa was removed from the Cincinnati game and also missed Miami's next two games as a result of the concussion. In response to the Tagovailoa concussion in the Cincinnati game, NFLPA's Executive Director DeMaurice Smith has stated they would make sure "to pursue every legal option" to lessen the concussions.

In the following weeks, the NFL enforced multiple controversial roughing the passer penalties. In a Week 5 game between the Atlanta Falcons and Tampa Bay Buccaneers, Atlanta trailed Tampa Bay by six points late in the fourth quarter. On a third down near midfield, Atlanta defensive tackle Grady Jarrett swung Tampa Bay quarterback Tom Brady to the ground for a sack, but Jarrett was penalized for roughing the passer. Referee Jerome Boger explained that he called the penalty because he perceived that Jarrett swung Brady to the ground unnecessarily. Had there been no penalty, Tampa Bay would have likely punted the ball back to Atlanta, who would have had the chance to win the game with a touchdown and extra point. Instead, the penalty awarded 15 yards and a fresh set of downs to the Buccaneers, who ran out the clock some plays later.

The next day, during a Monday Night Football game between the Las Vegas Raiders and the Kansas City Chiefs, Kansas City trailed their rival by ten points and just over a minute remaining in the second quarter. On a third down at the Las Vegas 46-yard line, Kansas City defensive tackle Chris Jones strip sacked Las Vegas quarterback Derek Carr and recovered the fumble as he tackled Carr, but Jones was penalized for roughing the passer. Referee Carl Cheffers explained that he called the penalty because he perceived that Jones landed with his full body weight on Carr. However, replays showed that Jones attempted to brace his fall with his left hand as he sacked Carr. Had there been no penalty, Kansas City would have had possession of the football at their opponent's 43-yard line with adequate time to narrow the deficit to three points. Instead, the penalty awarded 15 yards and a fresh set of downs to the Raiders, who extended the lead to 13 points after the ensuing plays. Chiefs fans relentlessly booed Cheffers and his officiating crew for the remainder of the half. Following the game, Jones stated that he believed that roughing the passer calls should be reviewable. This action has already been taken in the CFL to good effect. Carr himself admitted that he thought that Jones made a good play and that his tackle was not egregious.

The two aforementioned calls resulted in even more criticism from viewers, players, and commentators. After witnessing the Jones penalty, ESPN color analyst and former Dallas Cowboys quarterback Troy Aikman suggested that the NFL let defenders perform their jobs when he stated that the NFL should "take the dresses off." Other observers not only questioned the league for penalizing the acts that it began to more frequently penalize in 2018, but also perceived the controversial penalties on Jarrett and Jones to be overreactions to the Tagovailoa situation. Following the outrage, the NFL indicated that it would consider making roughing the passer to be a reviewable penalty. However, the change has yet to be made as of the beginning of the 2023 NFL season.

== Penalty assessed ==
- Canadian Football League: 15 yards (also enforces at the end of the play) and automatic first down
- NFL and NCAA: 15 yards (also enforces at the end of the play) OR half the distance to the goal, whichever is less, and an automatic first down.
- NIRSA: 10 yards (also enforces at the end of the play) and automatic first down
