= 2021 Memphis Tigers football team =

American college football season

2021 Memphis Tigers football

Hawaii Bowl, canceled vs. Hawaii
- Conference: American Athletic Conference
- Record: 6–6 (3–5 American)
- Head coach: Ryan Silverfield (2nd season)
- Offensive coordinator: Kevin Johns (3rd season)
- Offensive scheme: Spread
- Defensive coordinator: Mike MacIntyre (2nd season)
- Base defense: 3–4
- Home stadium: Liberty Bowl Memorial Stadium

2021 American Athletic Conference football standings
	Conf.			Overall
Team	W		L	W		L
No. 4 Cincinnati y$^	8	–	0	13	–	1
No. 17 Houston y	8	–	0	12	–	2
UCF	5	–	3	9	–	4
East Carolina	5	–	3	7	–	5
Tulsa	5	–	3	7	–	6
SMU	4	–	4	8	–	4
Memphis	3	–	5	6	–	6
Navy	3	–	5	4	–	8
Tulane	1	–	7	2	–	10
South Florida	1	–	7	2	–	10
Temple	1	–	7	3	–	9
Championship: Cincinnati 35, Houston 20
^ – College Football Playoff participant; $ – Conference champion; y – Championship game participant; Rankings from AP Poll

The 2021 Memphis Tigers football team represented the University of Memphis in the 2021 NCAA Division I FBS football season. The Tigers played their home games at Liberty Bowl Memorial Stadium in Memphis, Tennessee, and competed in the American Athletic Conference. They were led by second-year head coach Ryan Silverfield.

The Tigers finished the regular season with a 6–6 record and were due to face the Hawaii Rainbow Warriors in the Hawaii Bowl. However, due to a COVID-19 outbreak, season-ending injuries, and transfers, the Rainbow Warriors were forced to withdraw the day before the game, leaving the Tigers without a bowl game.

== Preseason ==
=== American Athletic Conference preseason media poll ===
The American Athletic Conference preseason media poll was released at the virtual media day held August 4, 2021. Cincinnati, who finished the 2020 season ranked No. 8 nationally, was tabbed as the preseason favorite in the 2021 preseason media poll.

Media poll
Predicted finish	Team	Votes (1st place)
1	Cincinnati	262 (22)
2	UCF	241 (2)
3	SMU	188
4	Houston	181
5	Memphis	168
6	Tulsa	153
7	Tulane	132
т-8	East Carolina	85
т-8	Navy	85
10	Temple	46
11	South Florida	43

== Schedule ==
Date	Time	Opponent	Site	TV	Result	Attendance
September 4	6:00 p.m.	No. 22 (FCS) Nicholls*	Liberty Bowl Memorial Stadium; Memphis, TN	ESPN+	W 42–17	30,263
September 11	6:00 p.m.	at Arkansas State*	Centennial Bank Stadium; Jonesboro, AR (Paint Bucket Bowl)	ESPN+	W 55–50	19,501
September 18	3:00 p.m.	Mississippi State*	Liberty Bowl Memorial Stadium; Memphis, TN	ESPN2	W 31–29	43,461
September 25	2:30 p.m.	UTSA*	Liberty Bowl Memorial Stadium; Memphis, TN	ESPNU	L 28–31	29,264
October 2	11:00 a.m.	at Temple	Lincoln Financial Field; Philadelphia, PA	ESPNU	L 31–34	28,573
October 9	8:00 p.m.	at Tulsa	H.A. Chapman Stadium; Tulsa, OK	ESPN2	L 29–35	17,593
October 14	6:30 p.m.	Navy	Liberty Bowl Memorial Stadium; Memphis, TN	ESPN	W 35–17	30,042
October 22	6:00 p.m.	at UCF	Bounce House; Orlando, FL	ESPN2	L 7–24	39,328
November 6	11:00 a.m.	SMU	Liberty Bowl Memorial Stadium; Memphis, TN	ESPNU	W 28–25	30,191
November 13	11:00 a.m.	East Carolina	Liberty Bowl Memorial Stadium; Memphis, TN	ESPN+	L 29–30 ^{OT}	28,431
November 19	8:00 p.m.	at No. 24 Houston	TDECU Stadium; Houston, TX	ESPN2	L 13–31	28,712
November 27	6:30 p.m.	Tulane	Liberty Bowl Memorial Stadium; Memphis, TN	ESPNU	W 33–28	27,416
~~December 24~~	~~8:00 p.m.~~	at ~~Hawaii~~*	~~Clarence T. C. Ching Athletics Complex~~; ~~Honolulu, HI~~ (~~Hawaii Bowl~~)	~~ESPN~~	Canceled ^{A}	_
*Non-conference game; Rankings from AP Poll (and CFP Rankings, after November 2) - Released prior to game; All times are in Central time

- Hawaii was forced to withdraw due to COVID-19 and other related issues within the team. The game was canceled shortly after.

== Game summaries ==
=== Nicholls ===
Nicholls at Memphis

Team	1	2	3	4	Total
No. 22 (FCS) Colonels	7	0	7	3	17
• Tigers	10	19	6	7	42

- Date: September 4, 2021
- Location: Liberty Bowl Memorial Stadium
  Memphis, TN
- Game start: 6:05 p.m. CDT
- Elapsed time: 3 hours and 13 minutes
- Game attendance: 30,263
- Game weather: 87 °F (31 °C) • Weather: Sunny • Wind: S 9 MPH
- Referee: Edwin Lee
- TV announcers (ESPN+): Richard Cross (play–by–play) and Leger Douzable (analyst)

Scoring summary
1	09:13	NICH	K.J. Franklin 10-yard pass from Lindsey Scott Jr. (Gavin Lasseigne kick) (11 plays, 75 yards, 5:47)	NICH 7–0
1	06:11	MEM	Joe Doyle 26-yard field goal (10 plays, 57 yards, 2:56)	NICH 7–3
1	01:38	MEM	Rodrigues Clark 13-yard rush (Joe Doyle kick) (12 plays, 72 yards, 3:45)	MEM 7–10
2	12:29	MEM	Brandon Thomas 10-yard rush (Joe Doyle kick) (5 plays, 69 yards, 1:32)	MEM 7–17
2	07:19	MEM	Joe Doyle 33-yard field goal (10 plays, 60 yards, 3:27)	MEM 7–20
2	02:15	MEM	Marquavius Weaver 1-yard rush (two-point conversion rush attempt failed) (8 plays, 78 yards, 2:17)	MEM 7–26
2	00:13	MEM	Joe Doyle 24-yard field goal (11 plays, 54 yards, 1:31)	MEM 7–29
3	11:46	MEM	Joe Doyle 38-yard field goal (8 plays, 54 yards, 3:11)	MEM 7–32
06:54	NICH	Lindsey Scott Jr. 5-yard rush (Gavin Lasseigne kick) (10 plays, 75 yards, 4:47)	MEM 14–32
03:41	MEM	Joe Doyle 25-yard field goal (8 plays, 61 yards, 3:05)	MEM 14–35
4	12:53	MEM	Calvin Austin III 11-yard pass from Seth Henigan (Joe Doyle kick) (8 plays, 75 yards, 3:20)	MEM 14–42
4	09:20	NICH	Gavin Lasseigne 35-yard field goal (9 plays, 56 yards, 3:33)	MEM 17–42

Statistics	Nicholls	Memphis
First downs	17	32
Total yards	299	587
Rushing yards	100	322
Passing yards	199	265
Turnovers	1	0
Time of possession	28:45	31:15

Team	Category	Player	Statistics
Nicholls	Passing	Lindsey Scott Jr.	17/30, 194 yards, 1 TD
Nicholls	Rushing	Julien Gums	13 carries, 48 yards
Nicholls	Receiving	Dai'Jean Dixon	7 receptions, 107 yards
Memphis	Passing	Seth Henigan	19/32, 265 yards, 1 TD
Memphis	Rushing	Brandon Thomas	16 carries, 147 yards, 1 TD
Memphis	Receiving	Javon Ivory	5 receptions, 106 yards

=== At Arkansas State ===
Memphis at Arkansas State

Team	1	2	3	4	Total
• Tigers	20	14	7	14	55
Red Wolves	10	13	7	20	50

- Date: September 11, 2021
- Location: Centennial Bank Stadium
  Jonesboro, AR
- Game start: 6:05 p.m. CDT
- Elapsed time: 3 hours and 47 minutes
- Game attendance: 19,501
- Game weather: 86 °F (30 °C) • Weather: Sunny • Wind: SW 10 MPH
- Referee: Luke Richmond
- TV announcers (ESPN+): Brad Bobo (play–by–play), Pete Cordelli (analyst), and Cori Keller (sideline reporter)

Scoring summary
1	13:20	MEM	Calvin Austin III 55-yard pass from Seth Henigan (Joe Doyle kick) (6 plays, 75 yards, 1:40)	MEM 7–0
1	06:11	MEM	Sean Dykes 17-yard pass from Seth Henigan (Joe Doyle PAT failed) (12 plays, 92 yards, 3:10)	MEM 13–0
1	04:30	ARST	Te'Vailance Hunt 53-yard pass from Layne Hatcher (Blake Grupe kick) (4 plays, 68 yards, 1:34)	MEM 13–7
1	04:05	MEM	Brandon Thomas 70-yard rush (Joe Doyle kick) (2 plays, 75 yards, 0:25)	MEM 20–7
1	02:02	ARST	Blake Grupe 48-yard field goal (4 plays, 1 yard, 1:19)	MEM 20–10
2	07:48	ARST	Blake Grupe 37-yard field goal (6 plays, 17 yards, 3:03)	MEM 20–13
2	05:09	MEM	Sean Dykes 40-yard pass from Seth Henigan (Joe Doyle kick) (1 play, 45 yards, 0:14)	MEM 27–13
2	01:30	ARST	Layne Hatcher 12-yard rush (Blake Grupe kick) (10 plays, 75 yards, 3:39)	MEM 27–20
2	01:20	MEM	Brandon Thomas 75-yard rush (Joe Doyle kick) (1 play, 75 yards, 0:06)	MEM 34–20
2	00:00	ARST	Blake Grupe 34-yard field goal (10 plays, 60 yards, 1:15)	MEM 34–23
3	08:43	MEM	Calvin Austin III 50-yard pass from Seth Henigan (Joe Doyle kick) (4 plays, 63 yards, 1:19)	MEM 41–23
3	01:09	ARST	Corey Rucker 23-yard pass from James Blackman (Blake Grupe kick) (4 plays, 79 yards, 1:23)	MEM 41–30
4	11:47	MEM	Marquavius Weaver 4-yard rush (Joe Doyle kick) (11 plays, 72 yards, 4:13)	MEM 48–30
4	10:54	ARST	Jeff Foreman 89-yard pass from James Blackman (two-point pass conversion attempt failed) (2 plays, 91 yards, 0:47)	MEM 48–36
4	10:39	MEM	Calvin Austin III 75-yard pass from Seth Henigan (Joe Doyle kick) (2 plays, 75 yards, 0:15)	MEM 55–36
4	05:01	ARST	Adam Jones 1-yard pass from James Blackman (Blake Grupe kick) (15 plays, 73 yards, 5:47)	MEM 55–43
4	01:52	ARST	Akeem Hayes 5-yard pass James Blackman (Blake Grupe kick) (10 plays, 87 yards, 1:56)	MEM 55–50

Statistics	Memphis	Arkansas State
First downs	24	35
Total yards	680	680
Rushing yards	263	98
Passing yards	417	582
Turnovers	2	0
Time of possession	24:04	35:56

Team	Category	Player	Statistics
Memphis	Passing	Seth Henigan	22/33, 417 yards, 5 TDs
Memphis	Rushing	Brandon Thomas	18 carries, 191 yards, 2 TDs
Memphis	Receiving	Calvin Austin	6 receptions, 239 yards, 3 TDs
Arkansas State	Passing	James Blackman	19/28, 306 yards, 4 TDs
Arkansas State	Rushing	Lincoln Pare	6 carries, 36 yards
Arkansas State	Receiving	Jeff Foreman	8 receptions, 198 yards, 1 TD

=== Mississippi State ===
Mississippi State at Memphis

Team	1	2	3	4	Total
Bulldogs	3	14	0	12	29
• Tigers	7	0	7	17	31

- Date: September 18, 2021
- Location: Liberty Bowl Memorial Stadium
  Memphis, TN
- Game start: 1:05 p.m. CDT
- Elapsed time: 3 hours and 36 minutes
- Game attendance: 43,461
- Game weather: 77 °F (25 °C) • Weather: Cloudy • Wind: NE 7 MPH
- Referee: Marc Curles
- TV announcers (ESPN2): Beth Mowins (play–by–play), Kirk Morrison (analyst), and Dawn Davenport (sideline reporter)

Scoring summary
1	12:02	MEM	Sanchez Blake Jr. 49-yard fumble returned (Joe Doyle kick) (5 plays, 21 yards, 2:58)	MEM 7–0
1	03:20	MSST	Nolan McCord 39-yard field goal (17 plays, 54 yards, 8:42)	MEM 7–3
2	09:58	MSST	Dillon Johnson 3-yard rush (Nolan McCord kick) (10 plays, 75 yards, 4:28)	MSST 10–7
2	05:07	MSST	Jaden Walley 6-yard pass from Will Rogers (Nolan McCord kick) (9 plays, 81 yards, 3:41)	MSST 17–7
3	06:20	MEM	Calvin Austin III 21-yard pass from Seth Henigan (Joe Doyle kick) (12 plays, 98 yards, 4:59)	MSST 17–14
4	07:48	MEM	Calvin Austin III 25-yard pass from Seth Henigan (Joe Doyle kick) (4 plays, 36 yards, 1:18)	MEM 21–17
4	05:36	MEM	Calvin Austin III 94-yard punt return (Joe Doyle kick) (5 plays, 22 yards, 2:12)	MEM 28–17
4	03:03	MSST	Malik Heath 9-yard pass from Will Rogers (two-point pass conversion attempt failed) (6 plays, 57 yards, 2:33)	MEM 28–23
4	02:02	MEM	Joe Doyle 51-yard field goal (4 plays, 4 yards, 1:01)	MEM 31–23
4	01:32	MSST	Makai Polk 36-yard pass from Will Rogers (2 plays, 65 yards, 0:30)	MEM 31–29

Statistics	Mississippi State	Memphis
First downs	26	12
Total yards	468	246
Rushing yards	49	87
Passing yards	419	159
Turnovers	0	1
Time of possession	37:30	32:13

Team	Category	Player	Statistics
Mississippi State	Passing	Will Rogers	50/67, 419 yards, 3 TDs
Mississippi State	Rushing	Dillon Johnson	7 carries, 49 yards, 1 TD
Mississippi State	Receiving	Makai Polk	11 receptions, 136 yards, 1 TD
Memphis	Passing	Seth Henigan	16/28, 159 yards, 2 TDs, 1 INT
Memphis	Rushing	Brandon Thomas	16 carries, 83 yards
Memphis	Receiving	Calvin Austin	9 receptions, 105 yards, 2 TDs

=== UTSA ===
UTSA at Memphis

Team	1	2	3	4	Total
• Roadrunners	0	7	7	17	31
RV Tigers	21	0	7	0	28

- Date: September 25, 2021
- Location: Liberty Bowl Memorial Stadium
  Memphis, TN
- Game start: 2:35 p.m. CDT
- Elapsed time: 3 hours and 23 minutes
- Game attendance: 29,264
- Game weather: 82 °F (28 °C) • Weather: Sunny • Wind: W 6 MPH
- Referee: Joe Lehring
- TV announcers (ESPNU): John Schriffen (play–by–play) and Rene Ingoglia (analyst)

Scoring summary
1	13:24	MEM	Wardalis Ducksworth 0-yard fumble returned (Joe Doyle kick) (1 play, -28 yards, 0:22)	MEM 7–0
1	09:23	MEM	Rodriguez Clark 7-yard rush (Joe Doyle kick) (8 plays, 62 yards, 3:20)	MEM 14–0
1	06:22	MEM	Calvin Austin III 60-yard pass from Seth Henigan (Joe Doyle kick) (5 plays, 81 yards, 1:32)	MEM 21–0
2	09:54	UTSA	Sincere McCormick 12-yard rush (Hunter Duplessis kick) (12 plays, 87 yards, 4:56)	MEM 21–7
3	05:25	UTSA	Sincere McCormick 8-yard rush (Hunter Duplessis kick) (11 plays, 66 yards, 3:19)	MEM 21–14
3	02:44	MEM	Brandon Thomas 1-yard rush (Joe Doyle kick) (7 plays, 73 yards, 2:36)	MEM 28–14
4	13:35	UTSA	Zakhari Franklin 7-yard pass from Frank Harris (Hunter Duplessis kick) (9 plays, 75 yards, 4:09)	MEM 28–21
4	10:30	UTSA	Sincere McCormick 1-yard rush (Hunter Duplessis kick) (4 plays, 7 yards, 1:32)	TIE 28–28
4	00:00	UTSA	Hunter Duplessis 42-yard field goal (9 plays, 47 yards, 2:46)	UTSA 31–28

Statistics	UTSA	Memphis
First downs	25	16
Total yards	399	407
Rushing yards	205	78
Passing yards	194	329
Turnovers	1	2
Time of possession	35:42	24:18

Team	Category	Player	Statistics
UTSA	Passing	Frank Harris	18/28, 186 yards, 1 TD
UTSA	Rushing	Sincere McCormick	42 carries, 184 yards, 3 TD
UTSA	Receiving	Joshua Cephus	6 receptions, 82 yards
Memphis	Passing	Seth Henigan	15/25, 329 yards, 1 TD
Memphis	Rushing	Brandon Thomas	20 carries, 73 yards, 1 TD
Memphis	Receiving	Sean Dykes	6 receptions, 167 yards

=== At Temple ===
Memphis at Temple

Team	1	2	3	4	Total
Tigers	3	14	6	8	31
• Owls	0	17	7	10	34

- Date: October 2, 2021
- Location: Lincoln Financial Field
  Philadelphia, PA
- Game start: 11:00 a.m. CDT
- Elapsed time: 3 hours and 23 minutes
- Game attendance: 28,573
- Game weather: 72 °F (22 °C) • Weather: Sunny • Wind: SW 12 MPH
- Referee: Hank Johns
- TV announcers (ESPNU): Kevin Brown (play-by-play) and Hutson Mason (analyst)

Scoring summary
1	5:21	MEM	Joe Doyle 26-yard field goal (17 plays, 84 yards, 5:09)	MEM 3–0
2	14:54	MEM	Rodrigues Clark 6-yard run (Joe Doyle kick) (7 plays, 72 yards, 1:35)	MEM 10–0
2	12:38	MEM	Javon Ivory 35-yard pass from Seth Henigan (Joe Doyle kick) (1 play, 35 yards, 0:08)	MEM 17–0
2	5:03	TEM	Jadan Blue 1-yard pass from D'Wan Mathis (Rory Bell kick) (17 plays, 75 yards, 7:35)	MEM 17–7
2	3:37	TEM	Jose Barbon 15-yard pass from D'Wan Mathis (Rory Bell kick) (3 plays, 17 yards, 0:53)	MEM 17–14
2	0:00	TEM	Rory Bell 35-yard field goal (9 plays, 46 yards, 2:07)	TIED 17–17
3	7:15	MEM	Sean Dykes 2-yard pass from Seth Henigan (Joe Doyle kick blocked) (11 plays, 69 yards, 4:40)	MEM 23–17
3	1:14	TEM	Tayvon Ruley 1-yard run (Rory Bell kick) (13 plays, 75 yards, 6:01)	TEM 24–23
4	6:16	TEM	Rory Bell 32-yard field goal (9 plays, 71 yards, 3:36)	TEM 27–23
4	2:35	TEM	Amad Anderson Jr. 53-yard pass from D'Wan Mathis (Rory Bell kick) (3 plays, 57 yards, 0:18)	TEM 34–23
4	0:30	MEM	Javon Ivory 9-yard pass from Seth Henigan (Calvin Austin III pass) (11 plays, 75 yards, 2:05)	TEM 34–31

Statistics	Memphis	Temple
First downs	25	23
Total yards	462	479
Rushing yards	157	157
Passing yards	305	322
Turnovers	2	0
Time of possession	24:33	35:27

Team	Category	Player	Statistics
Memphis	Passing	Seth Henigan	24/40, 305 yards, 3 TD
Memphis	Rushing	Rodrigues Clark	18 carries, 92 yards, TD
Memphis	Receiving	Calvin Austin III	8 receptions, 104 yards
Temple	Passing	D'Wan Mathis	35/49, 322 yards, 3 TD
Temple	Rushing	Edward Saydee	12 carries, 62 yards
Temple	Receiving	Amad Anderson Jr.	3 receptions, 108 yards, TD

=== At Tulsa ===
Memphis at Tulsa

Team	1	2	3	4	Total
Tigers	0	13	0	16	29
• Golden Hurricane	7	7	7	14	35

- Date: October 9, 2021
- Location: Skelly Field at H. A. Chapman Stadium
  Tulsa, OK
- Game start: 8:06 p.m. CDT
- Elapsed time: 3 hours and 33 minutes
- Game attendance: 17,593
- Game weather: 84 °F (29 °C) • Weather: Sunny • Wind: S 11 MPH
- Referee: Charl Lamertina
- TV announcers (ESPN2): Brian Custer (play-by-play), Kelly Stouffer (analyst), and Lauren Sisler (sideline)

Scoring summary
1	5:32	TULSA	Shamari Brooks 13-yard run (Zach Long kick) (13 plays, 80 yards, 4:30)	TULSA 7–0
2	7:36	MEM	Brandon Thomas 5-yard run (David Kemp kick) (12 plays, 80 yards, 5:32)	TIED 7–7
2	0:38	MEM	Brandon Thomas 2-yard run (David Kemp kick failed) (15 plays, 93 yards, 5:18)	MEM 13–7
2	0:11	TULSA	Sam Crawford Jr. 28-yard pass from Davis Brin (Zach Long kick) (3 plays, 75 yards, 0:27)	TULSA 14–13
3	4:37	TULSA	Shamari Brooks 3-yard run (Zack Long kick) (5 plays, 20 yards, 1:58)	TULSA 21–13
4	9:55	TULSA	Josh Johnson 63-yard pass from Davis Brin (Zack Long kick) (5 plays, 78 yards, 2:28)	TULSA 28–13
4	8:12	MEM	Sean Dykes 9-yard pass from Seth Henigan (Sean Dykes pass) (7 plays, 75 yards, 1:43)	TULSA 28–21
4	4:28	TULSA	Anthony Watkins 44-yard run (Zack Long kick) (7 plays, 78 yards, 3:37)	TULSA 35–21
4	3:11	MEM	Calvin Austin III 30-yard pass from Seth Henigan (Javon Ivory pass) (8 plays, 75 yards, 1:17)	TULSA 35–29

Statistics	Memphis	Tulsa
First downs	33	19
Total yards	614	417
Rushing yards	151	235
Passing yards	463	182
Turnovers	3	0
Time of possession	33:35	26:25

Team	Category	Player	Statistics
Memphis	Passing	Seth Henigan	34/57, 463 yards, 2 TD, 2 INT
Memphis	Rushing	Brandon Thomas	18 carries, 77 yards, 2 TD
Memphis	Receiving	Calvin Austin III	13 receptions, 200 yards, TD
Tulsa	Passing	Davis Brin	11/21, 182 yards, 2 TD
Tulsa	Rushing	Shamari Brooks	26 carries, 126 yards, 2 TD
Tulsa	Receiving	Josh Johnson	8 receptions, 140 yards, TD

=== Navy ===
Navy at Memphis

Team	1	2	3	4	Total
Midshipmen	7	3	7	0	17
• Tigers	14	14	7	0	35

- Date: October 14, 2021
- Location: Liberty Bowl Memorial Stadium
  Memphis, TN
- Game start: 6:30 p.m. CDT
- Elapsed time: 3 hours
- Game attendance: 30,042
- Game weather: 78 °F (26 °C) • Weather: Cloudy • Wind: S 8 MPH
- Referee: Edwin Lee
- TV announcers (ESPN): Matt Barrie (play-by-play), Roddy Jones (analyst), and Harry Lyles, Jr. (sideline)

Scoring summary
1	12:10	MEM	Sean Dykes 3-yard pass from Seth Henigan (Joe Doyle kick) (7 plays, 75 yards, 2:50)	MEM 7–0
1	0:20	NAVY	James Harris II 2-yard run (Bijan Nichols kick) (21 plays, 75 yards, 11:50)	TIE 7–7
1	0:00	MEM	Calvin Austin III 69-yard run (Joe Doyle kick) (1 play, 69 yards, 0:20)	MEM 14–7
2	8:21	NAVY	Bijan Nichols 36-yard field goal (5 plays, 6 yards, 2:11)	MEM 14–10
2	7:30	MEM	Eddie Lewis 74-yard pass from Seth Henigan (Joe Doyle kick) (3 plays, 86 yards, 0:51)	MEM 21–10
2	0:40	MEM	Brandon Thomas 3-yard run (Joe Doyle kick) (12 plays, 63 yards, 4:21)	MEM 28–10
3	8:09	NAVY	Mychal Copper 21-yard pass from Tai Lavatai (Bijan Nichols kick) (14 plays, 75 yards, 6:51)	MEM 28–17
3	6:07	MEM	Marquavius Weaver 4-yard run (Joe Doyle kick) (5 plays, 72 yards, 2:02)	MEM 35–17
4			No scoring plays

Statistics	Navy	Memphis
First downs	17	15
Total yards	241	415
Rushing yards	198	200
Passing yards	43	215
Turnovers	0	1
Time of possession	39:19	20:41

Team	Category	Player	Statistics
Navy	Passing	Tai Lavatai	3/4, 27 yards, TD
Navy	Rushing	Isaac Ruoss	18 carries, 75 yards
Navy	Receiving	Mychal Copper	1 reception, 21 yards, TD
Memphis	Passing	Seth Henigan	8/12, 215 yards, 2 TD, INT
Memphis	Rushing	Calvin Austin III	1 carry, 69 yards, TD
Memphis	Receiving	Eddie Lewis	3 receptions, 92 yards, TD

=== At UCF ===
Memphis at Central Florida

Team	1	2	3	4	Total
Tigers	0	7	0	0	7
• Knights	14	0	7	3	24

- Date: October 22, 2021
- Location: Bounce House
  Orlando, FL
- Game start: 6:00 p.m. CDT
- Elapsed time: 3 hours and 14 minutes
- Game attendance: 39,328
- Game weather: 79 °F (26 °C) • Weather: Sunny • Wind: W 6 MPH
- Referee: Luke Richmond
- TV announcers (ESPN2): Roy Philpott (play-by-play), Andre Ware (analyst), and Paul Carcaterra (sideline)

Scoring summary
1	10:12	UCF	Brandon Johnson 11-yard pass from Mikey Keene (Daniel Obarski kick) (9 plays, 68 yards, 4:40)	UCF 7–0
1	0:02	UCF	Ryan O'Keefe 13-yard pass from Joey Gatewood (Daniel Obarski kick) (3 plays, 27 yards, 1:14)	UCF 14–0
2	11:07	MEM	Brandon Thomas 9-yard run (Joe Doyle kick) (9 plays, 78 yards, 3:53)	UCF 14–7
3	4:59	UCF	Ryan O'Keefe 31-yard run (Daniel Obarski kick) (6 plays, 64 yards, 2:42)	UCF 21–7
4	14:09	UCF	Daniel Obarski 24-yard field goal (9 plays, 54 yards, 4:03)	UCF 24–7

Statistics	Memphis	UCF
First downs	25	17
Total yards	292	295
Rushing yards	77	215
Passing yards	215	80
Turnovers	4	1
Time of possession	31:48	28:10

Team	Category	Player	Statistics
Memphis	Passing	Peter Parrish	31/48, 215 yards, 3 INT
Memphis	Rushing	Peter Parrish	22 carries, 60 yards
Memphis	Receiving	Calvin Austin III	7 receptions, 44 yards
UCF	Passing	Mikey Keene	11/19, 63 yards, TD, INT
UCF	Rushing	Isaiah Bowser	26 carries, 111 yards
UCF	Receiving	Ryan O'Keefe	6 receptions, 41 yards, TD

=== SMU ===
Southern Methodist at Memphis

Team	1	2	3	4	Total
Mustangs	0	10	0	15	25
• Tigers	0	7	14	7	28

- Date: November 6, 2021
- Location: Liberty Bowl Memorial Stadium
  Memphis, TN
- Game start: 11:00 a.m. CDT
- Elapsed time: 3:14
- Game attendance: 30,191
- Game weather: Temperature: 54 °F (12 °C) • Weather: Sunny • Wind: 0 MPH
- Referee: Luke Richmond
- TV announcers (ESPNU): John Schriffen (play-by-play) and Rene Ingoglia (analyst)

Scoring summary
2	1:57	SMU	Danny Gray 48-yard pass from Tanner Mordecai (Blake Mazza kick) (6 plays, 80 yards, 2:25)	SMU 7–0
2	0:16	MEM	Eddie Lewis 2-yard pass from Seth Henigan (Joe Doyle kick) (8 plays, 75 yards, 1:41)	TIE 7–7
2	0:00	SMU	Blake Mazza 47-yard field goal (2 plays, 26 yards, 0:00)	SMU 10–7
3	8:47	MEM	Asa Martin 1-yard run (Joe Doyle kick) (5 plays, 41 yards, 2:33)	MEM 14–10
3	2:41	MEM	Javon Ivory 27-yard pass from Seth Henigan (Joe Doyle kick) (11 plays, 90 yards, 2:53)	MEM 21–10
4	11:01	MEM	Sean Dykes 40-yard pass from Seth Henigan (Joe Doyle kick) (9 plays, 71 yards, 5:15)	MEM 28–10
4	8:36	SMU	Danny Gray 27-yard pass from Tanner Mordecai (Tanner Mordecai pass to Rashee Rice) (8 plays, 66 yards, 2:18)	MEM 28–18
4	5:53	SMU	Tyler Levine 1-yard run (Blake Mazza kick) (5 plays, 32 yards, 1:19)	MEM 28–25

Statistics	SMU	Memphis
First downs	16	25
Total yards	323	468
Rushing yards	61	36
Passing yards	262	432
Turnovers	3	1
Time of possession	23:05	36:55

Team	Category	Player	Statistics
SMU	Passing	Tanner Mordecai	19/28, 262 yards, 2 TD, INT
SMU	Rushing	Tre Siggers	12 rushes, 53 yards
SMU	Receiving	Danny Gray	4 receptions, 98 yards, 2 TD
Memphis	Passing	Seth Henigan	34/53, 392 yards, 2 TD, INT
Memphis	Rushing	Marquavius Weaver	10 rushes, 17 yards
Memphis	Receiving	Calvin Austin	8 receptions, 88 yards

=== East Carolina ===
East Carolina at Memphis

Team	1	2	3	4	OT	Total
• Pirates	7	9	0	7	7	30
Tigers	7	6	7	3	6	29

- Date: November 13, 2021
- Location: Liberty Bowl Memorial Stadium
  Memphis, TN
- Game start: 11:05 CST
- Elapsed time: 3 hours and 12 minutes
- Game attendance: 28,431
- Game weather: 45 °F (7 °C) • Weather: Sunny • Wind: NW 7 MPH
- Referee: Charl Lamertina
- TV announcers (ESPN+): Richard Cross (play-by-play) and Brandon Weeden (analyst)

Scoring summary
1	9:03	MEM	Asa Martin 31-yard pass from Seth Henigan (David Kemp kick) (3 plays, 33 yards, 1:25)	MEM 7–0
1	3:50	ECU	Holton Ahlers 2-yard run (Owen Daffer kick) (12 plays, 75 yards, 5:13)	TIED 7–7
2	13:16	ECU	Owen Daffner 24-yard field goal (9 plays, 65 yards, 3:06)	ECU 10–7
2	3:04	ECU	Owen Daffner 29-yard field goal (19 plays, 65 yards, 8:09)	ECU 13–7
2	2:48	MEM	Eddie Lewis 75-yard pass from Seth Henigan (David Kemp kick failed) (2 plays, 75 yards, 0:16)	MEM 13–13
2	0:09	ECU	Owen Daffner 21-yard field goal (13 plays, 72 yards, 2:39)	ECU 16–13
3	2:48	MEM	Sean Dykes 2-yard pass from Seth Henigan (David Kemp kick) (8 plays, 80 yards, 2:30)	MEM 20–16
4	1:29	ECU	Rahjai Harris 1-yard run (Owen Daffer kick) (16 plays, 75 yards, 6:57)	ECU 23–20
4	0:00	MEM	David Kemp 24-yard field goal (15 plays, 69 yards, 1:29)	TIED 23–23
OT		ECU	Keaton Mitchell 24-yard run (Owen Daffer kick) (2 plays, 25 yards, 0:00)	ECU 30–23
OT		MEM	Rodrigues Clark 20-yard run (Calvin Austin III pass failed) (2 plays, 25 yards, 15:00)	ECU 30–23

Statistics	East Carolina	Memphis
First downs	32	16
Total yards	502	341
Rushing yards	185	108
Passing yards	317	233
Turnovers	2	1
Time of possession	42:47	32:13

Team	Category	Player	Statistics
East Carolina	Passing	Holton Ahlers	29/46, 317 yards, 2 INT
East Carolina	Rushing	Keaton Mitchell	17 carries, 81 yards, TD
East Carolina	Receiving	Tyler Snead	13 receptions, 113 yards
Memphis	Passing	Seth Henigan	15/26, 233 yards, 3 TD, INT
Memphis	Rushing	Seth Henigan	12 carries, 61 yards
Memphis	Receiving	Eddie Lewis	3 receptions, 93 yards, TD

=== At No. 24 Houston ===
Memphis at Houston

Team	1	2	3	4	Total
Tigers	0	3	7	3	13
• No. 24 Cougars	0	21	0	10	31

- Date: November 19, 2021
- Location: TDECU Stadium
  Houston, TX
- Game start: 8:00 p.m. CST
- Elapsed time: 3 hours and 40 minutes
- Game attendance: 28,712
- Game weather: • Weather: Cloudy • Wind: SE 4 MPH
- Referee: Hank Johns
- TV announcers (ESPN2): Jason Benetti (play-by-play), Andre Ware (analyst), and Paul Carcaterra (sideline)

Scoring summary
2	14:03	HOU	Alton McCaskill 36-yard run (Dalton Witherspoon kick) (1 play, 36 yards, 0:15)	HOU 7–0
2	5:40	HOU	Tank Dell 19-yard pass from Clayton Tune (Dalton Witherspoon kick) (11 plays, 93 yards, 4:36)	HOU 14–0
2	2:55	MEM	David Kemp 28-yard field goal (9 plays, 65 yards, 2:45)	HOU 14–3
2	0:53	HOU	Clayton Tune 20-yard run (Dalton Witherspoon kick) (6 plays, 63 yards, 2:02)	HOU 21–3
3	4:31	MEM	Asa Martin 5-yard pass from Seth Henigan (David Kemp kick) (11 plays, 60 yards, 4:16)	HOU 21–10
4	14:52	MEM	David Kemp 22-yard field goal (8 plays, 86 yards, 2:30)	HOU 21–13
4	3:24	HOU	Dalton Witherspoon 34-yard field goal (5 plays, 29 yards, 2:15)	HOU 24–13
4	1:43	HOU	Ta'Zhawn Henry 4-yard run (Dalton Witherspoon kick) (3 plays, 18 yards, 0:52)	HOU 31–13

Statistics	Memphis	Houston
First downs	24	25
Total yards	322	461
Rushing yards	106	197
Passing yards	216	264
Turnovers	2	2
Time of possession	25:34	34:26

Team	Category	Player	Statistics
Memphis	Passing	Seth Henigan	21/45, 208 yards, 1 TD, 2 INTs
Memphis	Rushing	Rodrigues Clark	12 rushes, 32 yards
Memphis	Receiving	Calvin Austin	5 receptions, 103 yards
Houston	Passing	Clayton Tune	20/34, 264 yards, 1 TD, 2 INTs
Houston	Rushing	Ta'Zhawn Henry	13 rushes, 73 yards, 1 TD
Houston	Receiving	Tank Dell	7 receptions, 100 yards, 1 TD

=== Tulane ===
Tulane at Memphis

Team	1	2	3	4	Total
Green Wave	7	7	7	7	28
• Tigers	7	7	6	13	33

- Date: November 27, 2021
- Location: Liberty Bowl Memorial Stadium
  Memphis, TN
- Game start: 6:32 CST
- Elapsed time: 3 hours and 22 minutes
- Game attendance: 27,416
- Game weather: 50 °F (10 °C) • Weather: Sunny • Wind: S 9 MPH
- Referee: Tim Rich
- TV announcers (ESPNU): Tiffany Greene (play-by-play) and Jay Walker (analyst)

Scoring summary
1	8:17	TULN	Michael Pratt 14-yard run (Merek Glover kick) (12 plays, 84 yards, 5:29)	TULN 7–0
1	2:02	MEM	Gabriel Rogers 13-yard pass from Seth Henigan (David Kemp kick) (16 plays, 75 yards, 6:15)	TIED 7–7
2	12:34	TULN	Tyjae Spears 7-yard run (Merek Glover kick) (10 plays, 52 yards, 4:23)	TULN 14–7
2	10:52	MEM	Rodrigues Clark 15-yard pass from Seth Henigan (David Kemp kick) (5 plays, 72 yards, 1:37)	TIED 14–14
3	10:29	MEM	David Kemp 27-yard field goal (11 plays, 44 yards, 3:49)	MEM 17–14
3	4:38	MEM	David Kemp 40-yard field goal (8 plays, 39 yards, 2:24)	MEM 20–14
3	2:11	TULN	Tyjae Spears 2-yard run (Merek Glover kick) (6 plays, 75 yards, 2:27)	TULN 21–20
4	14:57	MEM	Asa Martin 1-yard run (Roc Taylor pass failed) (6 plays, 70 yards, 2:14)	MEM 26–21
4	13:31	MEM	Eddie Lewis 25-yard pass from Seth Henigan (David Kemp kick) (3 plays, 29 yards, 1:20)	MEM 33–21
4	1:55	TULN	Duece Watts 21-yard pass from Michael Pratt (Merek Glover kick) (8 plays, 64 yards, 2:22)	MEM 33–28

Statistics	Tulane	Memphis
First downs	25	24
Total yards	452	392
Rushing yards	305	56
Passing yards	147	336
Turnovers	4	0
Time of possession	28:58	31:02

Team	Category	Player	Statistics
Tulane	Passing	Michael Pratt	15/34, 147 yards, TD, 2 INT
Tulane	Rushing	Tyjae Spears	30 carries, 264 yards, 2 TD
Tulane	Receiving	Shae Wyatt	5 receptions, 47 yards
Memphis	Passing	Seth Henigan	27/42, 336 yards, 3 TD
Memphis	Rushing	Rodrigues Clark	11 carries, 28 yards
Memphis	Receiving	Sean Dykes	7 receptions, 89 yards

== Rankings ==
Ranking movements Legend: ██ Increase in ranking ██ Decrease in ranking — = Not ranked RV = Received votes
	Week															
Poll	Pre	1	2	3	4	5	6	7	8	9	10	11	12	13	14	Final
AP	—	—	—	—	RV	—	—	—	—	—	—	—	—	—	—	
Coaches	—	—	RV	RV	RV	—	—	—	—	—	—	—	—	—	—	
CFP	Not released									—	—	—	—	—	—	Not released
