= 2021 Navy Midshipmen football team =

American college football season

2021 Navy Midshipmen football
- Conference: American Athletic Conference
- Record: 4–8 (3–5 AAC)
- Head coach: Ken Niumatalolo (14th season)
- Offensive coordinator: Ivin Jasper (14th season)
- Offensive scheme: Triple option
- Defensive coordinator: Brian Newberry (3rd season)
- Base defense: 4–2–5
- Home stadium: Navy–Marine Corps Memorial Stadium

2021 American Athletic Conference football standings
	Conf.			Overall
Team	W		L	W		L
No. 4 Cincinnati y$^	8	–	0	13	–	1
No. 17 Houston y	8	–	0	12	–	2
UCF	5	–	3	9	–	4
East Carolina	5	–	3	7	–	5
Tulsa	5	–	3	7	–	6
SMU	4	–	4	8	–	4
Memphis	3	–	5	6	–	6
Navy	3	–	5	4	–	8
Tulane	1	–	7	2	–	10
South Florida	1	–	7	2	–	10
Temple	1	–	7	3	–	9
Championship: Cincinnati 35, Houston 20
^ – College Football Playoff participant; $ – Conference champion; y – Championship game participant; Rankings from AP Poll

The 2021 Navy Midshipmen football team represented the United States Naval Academy as a member of the American Athletic Conference (AAC) in the 2021 NCAA Division I FBS football season. The Midshipmen were led by 14th-year head coach Ken Niumatalolo and played their home games at Navy–Marine Corps Memorial Stadium.

== Preseason ==
=== American Athletic Conference preseason media poll ===
The American Athletic Conference preseason media poll was released at the virtual media day held August 4, 2021. Cincinnati, who finished the 2020 season ranked No. 8 nationally, was tabbed as the preseason favorite in the 2021 preseason media poll.

Media poll
Predicted finish	Team	Votes (1st place)
1	Cincinnati	262 (22)
2	UCF	241 (2)
3	SMU	188
4	Houston	181
5	Memphis	168
6	Tulsa	153
7	Tulane	132
т-8	East Carolina	85
т-8	Navy	85
10	Temple	46
11	South Florida	43

== Schedule ==
Date	Time	Opponent	Site	TV	Result	Attendance
September 4	3:30 p.m.	Marshall*	Navy–Marine Corps Memorial Stadium; Annapolis, MD	CBSSN	L 7–49	30,131
September 11	3:30 p.m.	Air Force*	Navy–Marine Corps Memorial Stadium; Annapolis, MD (Commander-in-Chief's Trophy)	CBS	L 3–23	36,997
September 25	7:00 p.m.	at Houston	TDECU Stadium; Houston, TX	ESPNU	L 20–28	25,054
October 2	3:30 p.m.	UCF	Navy–Marine Corps Memorial Stadium; Annapolis, MD	CBSSN	W 34–30	30,871
October 9	3:30 p.m.	No. 24 SMU	Navy–Marine Corps Memorial Stadium; Annapolis, MD (Gansz Trophy)	CBSSN	L 24–31	28,563
October 14	7:30 p.m.	at Memphis	Liberty Bowl Memorial Stadium; Memphis, TN	ESPN	L 17–35	30,042
October 23	12:00 p.m.	No. 2 Cincinnati	Navy–Marine Corps Memorial Stadium; Annapolis, MD	ESPN2	L 20–27	32,004
October 29	7:30 p.m.	at Tulsa	H.A. Chapman Stadium; Tulsa, OK	ESPN2	W 20–17	16,279
November 6	3:30 p.m.	at No. 10 Notre Dame*	Notre Dame Stadium; Notre Dame, IN (rivalry)	NBC	L 6–34	77,096
November 20	3:30 p.m.	East Carolina	Navy–Marine Corps Memorial Stadium; Annapolis, MD	CBSSN	L 35–38	28,001
November 27	12:00 p.m.	at Temple	Lincoln Financial Field; Philadelphia, PA	ESPNU	W 38–14	16,708
December 11	3:00 p.m.	vs. Army*	Metlife Stadium; East Rutherford, NJ (Army–Navy Game, College GameDay)	CBS	W 17–13	82,282
*Non-conference game; Rankings from AP Poll and CFP Rankings after November 2 released prior to game; All times are in Eastern time

== Personnel ==
=== Coaching staff ===
Name	Position	Seasons at Navy	Alma mater
Ken Niumatalolo	Head coach	24 (14 as HC)	Hawaii (1989)
Offensive staff
Ivin Jasper	Offensive coordinator / quarterbacks coach	22	Hawaii (1994)
Joe DuPaix	Slotbacks coach	7	Southern Utah (1998)
Ashley Ingram	Running game coordinator / offensive centers and guards coach	14	North Alabama (1996)
Jason MacDonald	Fullbacks Coach	3	Springfield College (MA) (2004)
Danny O'Rourke	Special teams coordinator / offensive tackles coach	20	West Georgia (1999)
Mick Yokitis	Wide receivers coach	11	Navy (2006)
Billy Ray Stutzmann	Offensive assistant coach	3	Hawaii (2013)
Defensive staff
Brian Newberry	Defensive coordinator / safeties coach	3	Baylor (1998)
James Adams	Cornerbacks coach	2	Wake Forest (2006)
Kevin Downing	Defensive ends / raiders coach	3	North Carolina Central (2004)
Robert Green	Defensive assistant coach / Director of Racial Equality	9	Navy (1998)
Joe Coniglio	Defensive assistant coach	1	Miami University (2006)
Steve Johns	Strikers Coach	14	Occidental (1991)
Jerrick Hall	Nose Guards / defensive tackles coach	3	NC State (2004)
P.J. Volker	Linebackers coach	3	Mount St. Joseph (2005)
Support staff
Brian Blick	Director of football operations	5	Navy (2012)
Va'a Niumatalolo	Assistant to the director of football operations	2	BYU (2018)
Bryan Fitzpatrick	Associate director of athletics – Football Strength, Conditioning & Sports Performance	10	Towson (2005)
David Mahoney	Recruiting coordinator	5	Navy (2007)
Bryan Miller	Associate football strength and conditioning coach / sports science coordinator	7	North Park
Omar Nelson	Director of player personnel	5	Navy (1997)
Capt. Donald Bowers, USMC	Director of player development	2	Navy (2011)
Kevin Slattery	Director of Football Creative Design	3	York College (PA) (2016)
Hanna Kotlarek	Director of Football Creative Services	1	
Laura Webb	Administrative assistant to the head football coach	2	

== Rankings ==
Ranking movements Legend: — = Not ranked
	Week															
Poll	Pre	1	2	3	4	5	6	7	8	9	10	11	12	13	14	Final
AP	—	—	—	—	—	—	—	—	—	—	—	—	—			
Coaches	—	—	—	—	—	—	—	—	—	—	—	—	—			
CFP	Not released															Not released

== Game summaries ==
=== Marshall ===
Marshall at Navy

Team	1	2	3	4	Total
• Thundering Herd	14	7	7	21	49
Midshipmen	0	0	0	7	7

- Date: September 4, 2021
- Location: Navy–Marine Corps Memorial Stadium
  Annapolis, MD
- Game start: 3:30 p.m. EDT
- Elapsed time: 3 hours, 18 minutes
- Game attendance: 30,131
- Game weather: 76 °F (24 °C) • Weather: Sunny, clear skies • Wind: SW 5–10 MPH
- Referee: Scott Hardin
- TV announcers (CBS Sports Network): Chick Hernandez (play-by-play), Randy Cross (analyst), and Sheehan Stanwick Burch (sideline)

Scoring summary
1	12:23	Marshall	Rasheen Ali 2-yard run (Andrew Sanders kick) (9 plays, 75 yards, 2:37)	Marshall 7–0
1	6:46	Marshall	Rasheen Ali 3-yard run (Andrew Sanders kick) (6 plays, 53 yards, 1:46)	Marshall 14–0
2	10:24	Marshall	Rasheen Ali 4-yard run (Andrew Sanders kick) (5 plays, 25 yards, 1:10)	Marshall 21–0
3	11:56	Marshall	Sheldon Evans 9-yard run (Andrew Sanders kick) (5 plays, 71 yards, 1:26)	Marshall 28–0
4	12:04	Navy	Xavier Arline 1-yard run (Bijan Nichols kick) (14 plays, 82 yards, 6:20)	Marshall 28–7
4	8:02	Marshall	Rasheen Ali 1-yard run (Andrew Sanders kick) (11 plays, 60 yards, 6:20)	Marshall 35–7
4	5:31	Marshall	Sheldon Evans 1-yard run (Andrew Sanders kick) (3 plays, 49 yards, 0:55)	Marshall 42–7
4	2:01	Marshall	E.J. Horton 30-yard pass from Luke Zban (Andrew Sanders kick) (1 play, 30 yards, 0:07)	Marshall 49–7

Statistics	Marshall	Navy
First downs	23	24
Total yards	464	398
Rushing yards	101	337
Passing yards	363	61
Turnovers	2	2
Time of possession	18:41	41:19

Team	Category	Player	Statistics
Marshall	Passing	Grant Wells	20/30, 333 yards, 2 INT
Marshall	Rushing	Rasheen Ali	14 carries, 59 yards, 4 TD
Marshall	Receiving	Talik Keaton	5 receptions, 100 yards
Navy	Passing	Maasai Maynor	2/6, 27 yards
Navy	Rushing	James Harris II	11 carries, 80 yards
Navy	Receiving	Mychal Copper	2 receptions, 30 yards

=== Air Force ===
Air Force at Navy

Team	1	2	3	4	Total
• Falcons	0	7	7	9	23
Midshipmen	0	3	0	0	3

- Date: September 11, 2021
- Location: Navy–Marine Corps Memorial Stadium
  Annapolis, MD
- Game start: 3:30 p.m. EDT
- Elapsed time: 3 hours, 8 minutes
- Game attendance: 36,997
- Game weather: 78 °F (26 °C) • Weather: Partly cloudy • Wind: S 6 MPH
- Referee: David Alvarez
- TV announcers (CBS): Brad Nessler (play-by-play), Gary Danielson (analyst), and Jamie Erdahl (sideline)

Scoring summary
1			No scoring plays
2	10:36	Navy	Bijan Nichols 23-yard field goal (7 plays, 32 yards, 3:32)	Navy 3–0
2	1:09	Air Force	Brad Roberts 3-yard run (Matthew Dapore kick) (9 plays, 43 yards, 3:26)	Air Force 7–3
3	0:32	Air Force	Haaziq Daniels 28-yard run (Matthew Dapore kick) (9 plays, 54 yards, 4:09)	Air Force 14–3
4	13:33	Air Force	Team safety (4 plays, -25 yards, 2:59)	Air Force 16–3
4	9:13	Air Force	Brad Roberts 2-yard run (Matthew Depore kick) (7 plays, 58 yards, 4:20)	Air Force 23–3

Statistics	Air Force	Navy
First downs	14	6
Total yards	225	68
Rushing yards	176	36
Passing yards	49	32
Turnovers	0	1
Time of possession	36:48	23:12

Team	Category	Player	Statistics
Air Force	Passing	Haaziq Daniels	3/10, 49 yards
Air Force	Rushing	Brad Roberts	29 carries, 97 yards, 2 TD
Air Force	Receiving	Micah Davis	1 reception, 27 yards
Navy	Passing	Maasai Maynor	3/5, 32 yards,
Navy	Rushing	Xavier Arline	16 carries, 31 yards
Navy	Receiving	Mychal Copper	1 reception, 15 yards

Since this game was on the 20th anniversary of the 9/11 attacks, both teams donned special commemorative uniforms. The Air Force Falcons were designed to honor a B-52 bomber crew that flew in Operation Linebacker II during 1972. While the Midshipmen's uniform celebrated the United States Marine Corps, inspired by the iconic "Dress Blue A" uniform, with white gloves, black cleats, red trim, and royal blue pants. The helmet, shoulder and pant designs feature an Eagle, Globe and Anchor, as well as, the battle cry "OORAH", on the front of the helmet. The back of the helmet reads "Semper Fi", the Marine Corps motto abbreviated from Semper Fidelis, meaning "always faithful." The red stripe on the pants is known as the "Blood Stripe," a way to honor fallen and injured Marines.

=== At Houston ===
Navy at Houston

Team	1	2	3	4	Total
Midshipmen	7	10	0	3	20
• Cougars	7	0	7	14	28

- Date: September 25, 2021
- Location: TDECU Stadium
  Houston, TX
- Game start: 6:02 p.m. CDT
- Elapsed time: 3 hours and 8 minutes
- Game attendance: 25,054
- Game weather: 85 °F (29 °C) • Weather: Sunny • Wind: E 6 MPH
- Referee: Hank Johns
- TV announcers (ESPNU): Tiffany Greene (play-by-play) and Hutson Mason (analyst)

Scoring summary
1	13:57	NAVY	Xavier Arline 40-yard run (Bijan Nichols kick) (3 plays, 76 yards, 0:58)	NAVY 7–0
1	1:35	HOU	Marcus Jones 73-yard punt returned (Dalton Witherspoon kick) (3 plays, 4 yards, 2:03)	TIE 7–7
2	7:53	NAVY	Bijan Nichols 30-yard field goal (15 plays, 62 yards, 8:42)	NAVY 10–7
2	0:52	NAVY	Isaac Ruoss 1-yard run (Bijan Nichols kick) (11 plays, 89 yards, 5:28)	NAVY 17–7
3	3:16	HOU	Ta'Zhawn Henry 2-yard run (Kyle Ramsey kick) (7 plays, 43 yards, 4:23)	NAVY 17–14
4	14:53	HOU	Marcus Jones 47-yard pass from Clayton Tune (Kyle Ramsey kick) (7 plays, 81 yards, 1:55)	HOU 21–17
4	12:08	HOU	Ta'Zhawn Henry 1-yard run (Kyle Ramsey kick) (5 plays, 26 yards, 2:39)	HOU 28–17
4	6:12	NAVY	Bijan Nichols 36-yard field goal (13 plays, 56 yards, 5:56)	HOU 28–20

Statistics	Navy	Houston
First downs	16	20
Total yards	300	384
Rushing yards	202	127
Passing yards	98	257
Turnovers	1	0
Time of possession	33:21	26:39

Team	Category	Player	Statistics
Navy	Passing	Xavier Arline	3/6, 83 yards
Navy	Rushing	Xavier Arline	19 rushes, 64 yards, 1 TD
Navy	Receiving	Mychal Cooper	3 receptions, 83 yards
Houston	Passing	Clayton Tune	22/30, 257 yards, 1 TD
Houston	Rushing	Alton McCaskill	17 rushes, 74 yards
Houston	Receiving	Christian Trahan	4 receptions, 65 yards

=== UCF ===
Central Florida at Navy

Team	1	2	3	4	Total
Knights	13	10	7	0	30
• Midshipmen	7	10	0	17	34

- Date: October 2, 2021
- Location: Navy–Marine Corps Memorial Stadium
  Annapolis, MD
- Game start: 3:30 p.m. EDT
- Elapsed time: 3 hours, 14 minutes
- Game attendance: 30,871
- Game weather: 74 °F (23 °C) • Weather: Blue skies • Wind: SE 13 MPH
- Referee: Tim Rich
- TV announcers (CBS Sports Network): Chick Hernandez (play-by-play), Randy Cross (analyst), and Sheehan Stanwick Burch (sideline)

Scoring summary
1	13:24	UCF	Brandon Johnson 15-yard pass from Mikey Keene (Daniel Obarski kick) (1 play, 15 yards, 0:07)	UCF 7–0
1	5:14	NAVY	Tai Lavatai 7-yard run (Bijan Nichols kick) (16 plays, 75 yards, 8:10)	TIE 7–7
1	0:56	UCF	Amari Johnson 16-yard run (Daniel Obarski PAT blocked) (8 plays, 75 yards, 4:18)	UCF 13–7
2	9:12	NAVY	Bijan Nichols 24-yard field goal (14 plays, 68 yards, 6:44)	UCF 13–10
2	6:26	UCF	Brandon Johnson 23-yard pass from Mikey Keene (Daniel Obarski kick) (6 plays, 58 yards, 2:46)	UCF 20–10
2	1:34	NAVY	Daniel Taylor 0-yard run of Blocked Punt (Bijan Nichols kick) (3 plays, 2 yards, 1:01)	UCF 20–17
2	0:00	UCF	Daniel Obarski 28-yard field goal (11 plays, 67 yards, 1:34)	UCF 23–17
3	2:55	UCF	Joey Greenwood 10-yard run (Daniel Obarski kick) (1 play, 10 yards, 0:06)	UCF 30–17
4	13:49	NAVY	Bijan Nichols 23-yard field goal (9 plays, 69 yards, 4:06)	UCF 30–20
4	9:45	NAVY	Tai Lavatai 1-yard rush (Bijan Nichols kick) (7 plays, 45 yards, 3:15)	UCF 30–27
4	3:09	NAVY	Isaac Ruoss 4-yard run (Bijan Nichols kick) (11 plays, 53 yards, 5:19)	NAVY 34–30

Statistics	UCF	Navy
First downs	17	26
Total yards	326	406
Rushing yards	148	348
Passing yards	178	58
Turnovers	2	2
Time of possession	20:42	39:18

Team	Category	Player	Statistics
UCF	Passing	Mikey Keene	16/26, 178 yards, 2TD, INT
UCF	Rushing	Johnny Richardson	11 carries, 59 yards
UCF	Receiving	Brandon Johnson	4 receptions, 79 yards, 2 TD
Navy	Passing	Tai Lavatai	2/4, 58 yards
Navy	Rushing	Carlinos Acie	11 carries, 85 yards
Navy	Receiving	Chance Warren	1 reception, 49 yards

This was the Navy Midshipmen's first win since October 17, 2020 when they played at ECU. Navy snapped their losing streak and got their first win this season. Also during this game, the Naval Academy Athletic Association retired former All-American and College Football Hall of Fame safety Chet Moeller's number 48 jersey. Moeller, who was also the East Coast Athletic (ECAC) Player of the Year in 1975, played for the Midshipmen from 1972 to 1975. He is the first defensive player to have his number retired by the Midshipmen.

=== No. 24 SMU ===
Southern Methodist at Navy

Team	1	2	3	4	Total
• No. 24 Mustangs	7	14	3	7	31
Midshipmen	7	14	3	0	24

- Date: October 9, 2021
- Location: Navy–Marine Corps Memorial Stadium
  Annapolis, MD
- Game start: 3:30 p.m. EDT
- Elapsed time: 3 hours, 5 minutes
- Game attendance: 28,563
- Game weather: 72 °F (22 °C) • Weather: Partly cloudy • Wind: SE 10 MPH
- Referee: Luke Richmond
- TV announcers (CBS Sports Network): John Sadak (play-by-play), Randy Cross (analyst), and Sheehan Stanwick Burch (sideline)

Scoring summary
1	13:28	SMU	Reggie Roberson Jr. 66-yard pass from Tanner Mordecai (Blake Mazza kick) (4 plays, 75 yards, 1:32)	SMU 7–0
1	3:57	NAVY	Chance Warren 23-yard run (Bijan Nichols kick) (7 plays, 50 yards, 3:37)	TIE 7–7
2	13:45	NAVY	Kai Puailoa-Rojas 37-yard pass from Tai Lavatai (Bijan Nichols kick) (6 plays, 71 yards, 2:51)	NAVY 14–7
2	7:43	NAVY	Diego Fagot 2p-yard Fumble Return (Bijan Nichols kick) (3 plays, –12 yards, 1:09)	NAVY 21–7
2	7:29	SMU	Bryan Massey 95-yard Kickoff Return (Blake Mazza kick) (1 play, 95 yards, 0:00)	NAVY 21–14
2	1:54	SMU	Tre Siggers 2-yard run (Blake Mazza kick) (11 plays, 69 yards, 4:04)	TIE 21–21
3	7:26	SMU	Blake Mazza 37-yard field goal (9 plays, 36 yards, 4:02)	SMU 24–21
3	0:23	NAVY	Bijan Nichols 50-yard field goal (13 plays, 42 yards, 7:03)	TIE 24–24
4	8:19	SMU	Jordan Kerley 22-yard pass from Tanner Mordecai (Blake Mazza kick) (9 plays, 65 yards, 3:52)	SMU 31-24

Statistics	SMU	Navy
First downs	22	12
Total yards	404	241
Rushing yards	80	177
Passing yards	324	64
Turnovers	2	0
Time of possession	27:41	32:19

Team	Category	Player	Statistics
SMU	Passing	Tanner Mordecai	30/40, 324 yards, 2 TD, INT
SMU	Rushing	Tre Siggers	14 carries, 49 yards, TD
SMU	Receiving	Reggie Roberson Jr.	5 receptions, 100 yards, TD
Navy	Passing	Tai Lavatai	4/7, 64 yards, TD
Navy	Rushing	Tai Lavatai	24 carries, 53 yards
Navy	Receiving	Kai Puailoa-Rojas	1 reception, 37 yards, TD

=== At Memphis ===
Navy at Memphis

Team	1	2	3	4	Total
Midshipmen	7	3	7	0	17
• Tigers	14	14	7	0	35

- Date: October 14, 2021
- Location: Liberty Bowl Memorial Stadium
  Memphis, TN
- Game start: 7:30 p.m. EDT
- Elapsed time: 3 hours
- Game attendance: 30,042
- Game weather: 78 °F (26 °C) • Weather: Cloudy • Wind: S 8 MPH
- Referee: Edwin Lee
- TV announcers (ESPN): Matt Barrie (play-by-play), Roddy Jones (analyst), and Harry Lyles, Jr. (sideline)

Scoring summary
1	12:10	MEM	Sean Dykes 3-yard pass from Seth Henigan (Joe Doyle kick) (7 plays, 75 yards, 2:50)	MEM 7–0
1	0:20	NAVY	James Harris II 2-yard run (Bijan Nichols kick) (21 plays, 75 yards, 11:50)	TIE 7–7
1	0:00	MEM	Calvin Austin III 69-yard run (Joe Doyle kick) (1 play, 69 yards, 0:20)	MEM 14–7
2	8:21	NAVY	Bijan Nichols 36-yard field goal (5 plays, 6 yards, 2:11)	MEM 14–10
2	7:30	MEM	Eddie Lewis 74-yard pass from Seth Henigan (Joe Doyle kick) (3 plays, 86 yards, 0:51)	MEM 21–10
2	0:40	MEM	Brandon Thomas 3-yard run (Joe Doyle kick) (12 plays, 63 yards, 4:21)	MEM 28–10
3	8:09	NAVY	Mychal Copper 21-yard pass from Tai Lavatai (Bijan Nichols kick) (14 plays, 75 yards, 6:51)	MEM 28–17
3	6:07	MEM	Marquavius Weaver 4-yard run (Joe Doyle kick) (5 plays, 72 yards, 2:02)	MEM 35–17
4			No scoring plays

Statistics	Navy	Memphis
First downs	17	15
Total yards	241	415
Rushing yards	198	200
Passing yards	43	215
Turnovers	0	1
Time of possession	39:19	20:41

Team	Category	Player	Statistics
Navy	Passing	Tai Lavatai	3/4, 27 yards, TD
Navy	Rushing	Isaac Ruoss	18 carries, 75 yards
Navy	Receiving	Mychal Copper	1 reception, 21 yards, TD
Memphis	Passing	Seth Henigan	8/12, 215 yards, 2 TD, INT
Memphis	Rushing	Calvin Austin III	1 carry, 69 yards, TD
Memphis	Receiving	Eddie Lewis	3 receptions, 92 yards, TD

=== No. 2 Cincinnati ===
Cincinnati at Navy

Team	1	2	3	4	Total
• No. 2 Bearcats	7	6	14	0	27
Midshipmen	7	3	0	10	20

- Date: October 23, 2021
- Location: Navy–Marine Corps Memorial Stadium
  Annapolis, MD
- Game start: 12:00 p.m. EDT
- Elapsed time: 3 hours, 24 minutes
- Game attendance: 32,004
- Game weather: 65 °F (18 °C) • Weather: Partly cloudy • Wind: WSW 5–10 MPH
- Referee: Tim Rich
- TV announcers (ESPN2): Dave Flemming (play-by-play), Rod Gilmore (analyst), and Stormy Buonantony (sideline)

Scoring summary
1	3:51	NAVY	Tai Lavatai 2-yard run (Bijan Nichols kick) (13 plays, 79 yards, 7:12)	NAVY 7–0
1	2:50	CIN	Josh Whyle 31-yard pass from Desmond Ridder (Christian Lowery kick) (3 plays, 44 yards, 1:01)	TIE 7–7
2	14:15	NAVY	Bijan Nichols 33-yard Field Goal (7 plays, 35 yards, 3:35)	NAVY 10–7
2	4:07	CIN	Christian Lowery 32-yard Field Goal (15 plays, 61 yards, 6:06)	TIE 10–10
2	0:00	CIN	Alex Bales 52-yard Field Goal (1 play, 0 yards, 0:01)	CIN 13–10
3	7:39	CIN	Jerome Ford 43-yard run (Christian Lowery kick) (4 plays, 54 yards, 1:27)	CIN 20–10
3	1:13	CIN	Josh Whyle 3-yard pass from Desmond Ridder (11 plays, 45 yards, 4:22)	CIN 27–10
4	8:19	NAVY	Bijan Nichols 27-yard Field Goal (9 plays, 48 yards, 4:27)	CIN 27–13
4	0:50	NAVY	Tai Lavatai 1-yard run (Bijan Nichols kick) (16 plays, 90 yards, 4:39)	CIN 27–20

Statistics	Cincinnati	Navy
First downs	14	22
Total yards	271	308
Rushing yards	21	67
Passing yards	176	116
Turnovers	1	1
Time of possession	20:33	39:27

Team	Category	Player	Statistics
Cincinnati	Passing	Desmond Ridder	18/30, 176 yards, 2 TD, INT
Cincinnati	Rushing	Jerome Ford	15 carries, 90 yards, TD
Cincinnati	Receiving	Josh Whyle	4 receptions, 60 yards, 2 TD
Navy	Passing	Tai Lavatai	11/15, 116 yards, INT
Navy	Rushing	Isaac Ruoss	19 carries, 80 yards
Navy	Receiving	Kai Puailoa-Rojas	2 receptions, 47 yards

=== At Tulsa ===
Navy at Tulsa

Team	1	2	3	4	Total
• Midshipmen	0	3	7	10	20
Golden Hurricane	0	3	7	7	17

- Date: October 29, 2021
- Location: Skelly Field at H. A. Chapman Stadium
  Tulsa, OK
- Game start: 7:30 p.m. EDT
- Elapsed time: 3 hours and 11 minutes
- Game attendance: 16,279
- Game weather: 61 °F (16 °C) • Weather: Sunny • Wind: N 8 mph
- Referee: Nate Black
- TV announcers (ESPN2): Jason Benetti (play-by-play), Andre Ware (analyst), and Paul Carcaterra (sideline)

Scoring summary
1			No scoring plays
2	6:37	TULSA	Zack Long 26-yard field goal (5 plays, 77 yards, 1:53)	TULSA 3–0
2	0:03	NAVY	Bijan Nichols 29-yard field goal (5 plays, 66 yards, 0:58)	TIE 3–3
3	14:47	TULSA	Anthony Watkins 97-yard kick-off return (Zack Long kick) (0 plays, 97 yards, 0:13)	TULSA 10–3
3	9:03	NAVY	James Hariis II 1-yard run (Bijan Nichols kick) (10 plays, 75 yards, 5:44)	TIE 10–10
4	11:25	NAVY	Tai Lavatai 1-yard run (Bijan Nichols kick) (15 plays, 80 yards, 8:09)	NAVY 17–10
4	4:14	NAVY	Bijan Nichols 46-yard field goal (7 plays, 19 yards, 3:56)	NAVY 20–10
4	2:21	TULSA	Ezra Naylor II 2-yard pass from Davis Brin (Zack Long kick) (8 plays, 65 yards, 1:53)	NAVY 20–17

Statistics	Navy	Tulsa
First downs	16	13
Total yards	302	294
Rushing yards	302	129
Passing yards	0	165
Turnovers	0	2
Time of possession	37:18	22:42

Team	Category	Player	Statistics
Navy	Passing	Team	0/1, 0 yards
Navy	Rushing	Carlinos Acie	3 carries, 80 yards
Navy	Receiving	—	—
Tulsa	Passing	Davis Brin	13/23, 165 yards, TD, INT
Tulsa	Rushing	Anthony Watkins	5 carries, 81 yards
Tulsa	Receiving	Juancarlos Santana	7 receptions, 109 yards

=== At No. 10 Notre Dame ===
Navy at Notre Dame

Team	1	2	3	4	Total
Midshipmen	3	0	3	0	6
• No. 10 Fighting Irish	0	17	0	17	34

- Date: November 6, 2021
- Location: Notre Dame Stadium
  Notre Dame, IN
- Game start: 3:30 p.m. EDT
- Elapsed time: 2 hours, 59 minutes
- Game attendance: 77,096
- Game weather: 55 °F (13 °C) • Weather: Sunny • Wind: SW 3 MPH
- Referee: Henry Johns
- TV announcers (NBC): Mike Tirico (play–by–play), Drew Brees (analyst), and Kathryn Tappen (sideline)

Scoring summary
1	3:03	NAVY	Bijan Nichols 49–yard field goal (13 plays, 36 yards, 7:36)	NAVY 3–0
2	9:47	ND	Jonathan Doerer 24–yard field goal (11 plays, 74 yards, 3:45)	TIE 3–3
2	2:46	ND	Kyren Williams 1–yard run (Jonathan Doerer kick) (11 plays, 66 yards, 5:00)	ND 10–3
2	0:50	ND	Kyren Williams 5–yard run (Jonathan Doerer kick) (5 plays, 95 yards, 1:00)	ND 17–3
3	5:16	NAVY	Bijan Nichols 21–yard field goal (14 plays, 71 yards, 9:44)	ND 17–6
4	13:20	ND	Team Safety (2 plays, –1 yard, 0:49)	ND 19–6
4	10:55	ND	Kyren Williams 20–yard run (Jack Coan pass to Braden Lenzy for Two-Point Conversion) (7 plays, 54 yards, 2:25)	ND 27–6
4	3:13	ND	Logan Diggs 8–yard run (Jonathan Doerer kick) (7 plays, 53 yards, 3:45)	ND 34–6

Statistics	Navy	Notre Dame
First downs	11	21
Total yards	184	430
Rushing yards	166	150
Passing yards	18	280
Turnovers	0	0
Time of possession	34:33	25:27

Team	Category	Player	Statistics
Navy	Passing	Xavier Arline	1/2, 18 yards
Navy	Rushing	Isaac Ruoss	22 carries, 73 yards
Navy	Receiving	Jayden Umbarger	1 reception, 18 yards
Notre Dame	Passing	Jack Coan	23/29, 269 yards, TD
Notre Dame	Rushing	Kyren Williams	17 carries, 95 yards, 2 TD
Notre Dame	Receiving	Kevin Austin Jr.	6 receptions, 139 yards, TD

=== East Carolina ===
East Carolina at Navy

Team	1	2	3	4	Total
• Pirates	14	10	0	14	38
Midshipmen	7	14	0	14	35

- Date: November 20, 2021
- Location: Navy–Marine Corps Memorial Stadium
  Annapolis, MD
- Game start: 3:30 p.m. EST
- Elapsed time: 3 hours, 10 minutes
- Game attendance: 28,001
- Game weather: 47 °F (8 °C) • Weather: Chilly, clear skies • Wind: S 10–25 MPH
- Referee: Luke Richmond
- TV announcers (CBS Sports Network): John Sadak (play-by-play), Randy Cross (analyst), and Sheehan Stanwick Burch (sideline)

Scoring summary
1	12:14	ECU	Keaton Mitchell 10–yard run (Owen Daffer kick) (6 plays, 75 yards, 2:46)	ECU 7–0
1	2:46	NAVY	Mychal Copper 4–yard pass from Tai Lavatai (Bijan Nichols kick) (10 plays, 78 yards, 5:13)	TIE 7–7
1	2:58	ECU	Tyler Snead 40–yard pass from Holton Ahlers (Owen Daffer kick) (7 plays, 78 yards, 4:03)	ECU 14–7
2	11:13	NAVY	Chance Warren 4–yard pass from Tai Lavatai (Bijan Nichols kick) (11 plays, 75 yards, 6:45)	TIE 14–14
2	5:29	ECU	Owen Daffer 37–yard field goal (12 plays, 58 yards, 4:44)	ECU 17–14
2	2:11	NAVY	Isaac Ruoss 19–yard run (Bijan Nichols kick) (7 plays, 70 yards, 3:18)	NAVY 21–17
2	0:18	ECU	Ryan Jones 5–yard pass from Holton Ahlers (Owen Daffer kick) (7 plays, 85 yards, 1:53)	ECU 24–22
3			No scoring plays.
4	14:03	NAVY	Carlinos Acie 90-yard run (Bijan Nichols kick) (1 plays, 90 yards, 0:13)	NAVY 28–24
4	8:47	ECU	Owen Daffer 25–yard field goal (11 plays, 58 yards, 5:16)	NAVY 28–27
4	8:33	NAVY	Maquel Haywood 98–yard kickoff return (Bijan Nichols kick) (0 plays, 0 yards, 0:00)	NAVY 35–27
4	5:01	ECU	Tyler Snead 28–yard pass from Holton Ahlers (Holton Ahlers pass to C.J. Johnson for Two-Point Conversion) (7 plays, 70 yards, 3:32)	TIE 35–35
4	0:00	ECU	Owen Daffer 54–yard field goal (4 plays, 44 yards, 1:11)	ECU 38–35

Statistics	East Carolina	Navy
First downs	24	17
Total yards	563	382
Rushing yards	158	345
Passing yards	405	37
Turnovers	0	0
Time of possession	32:40	27:20

Team	Category	Player	Statistics
East Carolina	Passing	Holton Ahlers	27/32, 405 yards, 3 TD
East Carolina	Rushing	Keaton Mitchell	18 carries, 94 yards, TD
East Carolina	Receiving	Tyler Snead	5 receptions, 137 yards, 2 TD
Navy	Passing	Tai Lavatai	4/4, 37 yards, 2 TD
Navy	Rushing	Carlinos Acie	6 carries, 155 yards, TD
Navy	Receiving	Mychal Copper	2 receptions, 31 yards, TD

=== At Temple ===
Navy at Temple

Team	1	2	3	4	Total
• Midshipmen	7	10	7	14	38
Owls	0	7	7	0	14

- Date: November 27, 2021
- Location: Lincoln Financial Field
  Philadelphia, PA
- Game start: 12:00 p.m. EST
- Elapsed time: 3 hours, 2 minutes
- Game attendance:
- Game weather: 39 °F (4 °C) • Weather: Cloudy • Wind: NW 18 MPH
- Referee: 16,708
- TV announcers (ESPNU): Kevin Brown (play-by-play) and Hutson Mason (analyst)

Scoring summary
1	4:33	NAVY	Carlinos Acie 11–yard run (Bijan Nichols kick) (5 plays, 27 yards, 2:22)	NAVY 7–0
2	10:40	NAVY	Chance Warren 15–yard pass from Xavier Arline (Bijan Nichols kick) (13 plays, 71 yards, 6:40)	NAVY 14–0
2	8:30	TEM	Ra'Von Bonner 1–yard run (Rory Bell kick) (1 play, 1 yard, 0:04)	NAVY 14–7
2	0:11	NAVY	Bijan Nichols 32–yard field goal (4 plays, –8 yards, 1:23)	NAVY 17–7
3	6:43	NAVY	Isaac Ruoss 3–yard run (Bijan Nichols kick) (11 plays, 58 yards, 5:22)	NAVY 24–7
3	0:47	TEM	Tayvon Ruley 4–yard run (Rory Bell kick) (14 plays, 80 yards, 5:51)	NAVY 24–14
4	9:04	NAVY	Isaac Ruoss 6-yard run (Bijan Nichols kick) (12 plays, 75 yards, 6:43)	NAVY 31–14
4	1:40	NAVY	Chance Warren 4–yard pass from Tai Lavatai (Bijan Nichols kick) (12 plays, 57 yards, 5:53)	NAVY 38–14

Statistics	Navy	Temple
First downs	21	11
Total yards	291	182
Rushing yards	219	84
Passing yards	72	98
Turnovers	1	3
Time of possession	37:11	22:49

Team	Category	Player	Statistics
Navy	Passing	Tai Lavatai	5/11, 57 yards, TD
Navy	Rushing	Carlinos Acie	10 carries, 86 yards, TD
Navy	Receiving	Chance Warren	3 receptions, 43 yards, 2 TD
Temple	Passing	Mariano Valenti	10/14, 73 yards
Temple	Rushing	Tayvon Ruley	9 carries, 68 yards, TD
Temple	Receiving	Jose Barbon	5 receptions, 34 yards

=== Vs. Army ===
Army vs. Navy

Team	1	2	3	4	Total
Black Knights	10	3	0	0	13
• Midshipmen	7	3	7	0	17

- Date: December 11, 2021
- Location: MetLife Stadium
  East Rutherford, NJ
- Game start: 3:00 p.m. EST
- Elapsed time: 3 hours, 9 minutes
- Game attendance: 82,282
- Game weather: 61 °F (16 °C) • Weather: Overcast, wind gusts • Wind: S 10–15 MPH
- Referee: Charles Lamertina
- TV announcers (CBS): Brad Nessler (play-by-play), Gary Danielson (analyst), and Jamie Erdahl (sideline)

Scoring summary
1	13:00	ARMY	Christian Anderson 56-yard run (Cole Talley kick) (4 plays, 75 yards, 2:00)	ARMY 7–0
1	7:22	NAVY	Tai Lavatai 8-yard run (Bijan Nichols kick) (11 plays, 83 yards, 5:38)	TIE 7–7
1	0:13	ARMY	Cole Talley 31-yard field goal (12 plays, 61 yards, 7:09)	ARMY 10–7
2	0:11	ARMY	Cole Talley 32-yard Field Goal (8 plays, 49 yards, 4:42)	NAVY 13–7
3	9:02	NAVY	Tai Lavatai 2-yard run (Bijan Nichols kick) (10 plays, 74 yards, 5:58)	NAVY 14–13
4	6:10	NAVY	Bijan Nichols 43-yard field goal (15 plays, 49 yards, 8:56)	NAVY 17–13

Statistics	Army	Navy
First downs	11	13
Total yards	232	278
Rushing yards	124	196
Passing yards	108	92
Turnovers	0	0
Time of possession	25:35	34:25

Team	Category	Player	Statistics
Army	Passing	Christian Anderson	7/15, 108 yards
Army	Rushing	Christian Anderson	9 carries, 67 yards, TD
Army	Receiving	Isaiah Alston	1 reception, 35 yards
Navy	Passing	Tai Lavatai	4/6, 82 yards
Navy	Rushing	Tai Lavatai	20 carries, 62 yards, 2 TD
Navy	Receiving	Mychal Copper	1 reception, 28 yards

This year's Army–Navy Game uniforms for the Navy Midshipmen spotlight Naval Aviation, namely the carrier-based F/A-18 Super Hornet in a themed uniform named "Fly Navy". The color-rush navy kits feature the current active U.S. Military roundel national insignia, (a white star with white and red stripes), on each shoulder. On the left upper chest is a triangular squadron patch highlighting the Strike Fighter Wing, U.S. Atlantic Fleet based out of Naval Air Station in Oceana, Virginia. The pants have a red stripe between two white stripes running down the side, while the gloves have the "Fly Navy" script on the palms.

The right side of the helmet is emblazoned with "the roundel" while left side of the helmet has a hand-painted F/A-18 Super Hornet ("the Rhino"), which are operated by naval aviators and also the jet flown by the Navy's elite flight demonstration squadron, the Blue Angels. On the back of the helmet, three sets of gold wings are featured which are earned by naval aviators: Single Anchor–Navy Aviators (pilots); Double Anchor–Naval Flight Officers (navigators); and AC–Aircrew.

This year's exclusive Game Ball by Team Issue features the silhouette of an F/A-18 Super Hornet, the U.S. Military Roundel and color scheme, as well as an intricate stitching design around the laces.
