= 2021 SMU Mustangs football team =

American college football season

2021 SMU Mustangs football
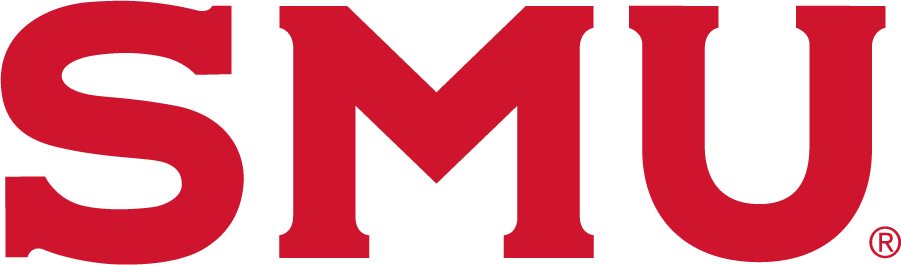

Fenway Bowl, vs. Virginia, Canceled
- Conference: American Athletic Conference
- Record: 8–4 (4–4 The American)
- Head coach: Sonny Dykes (4th season; regular season); Jim Leavitt (interim; bowl game)
- Co-offensive coordinators: Garrett Riley (2nd season); A. J. Ricker (2nd season)
- Offensive scheme: Bear raid
- Defensive coordinator: Jim Leavitt (1st season)
- Base defense: 3–4
- Home stadium: Gerald J. Ford Stadium

Uniform
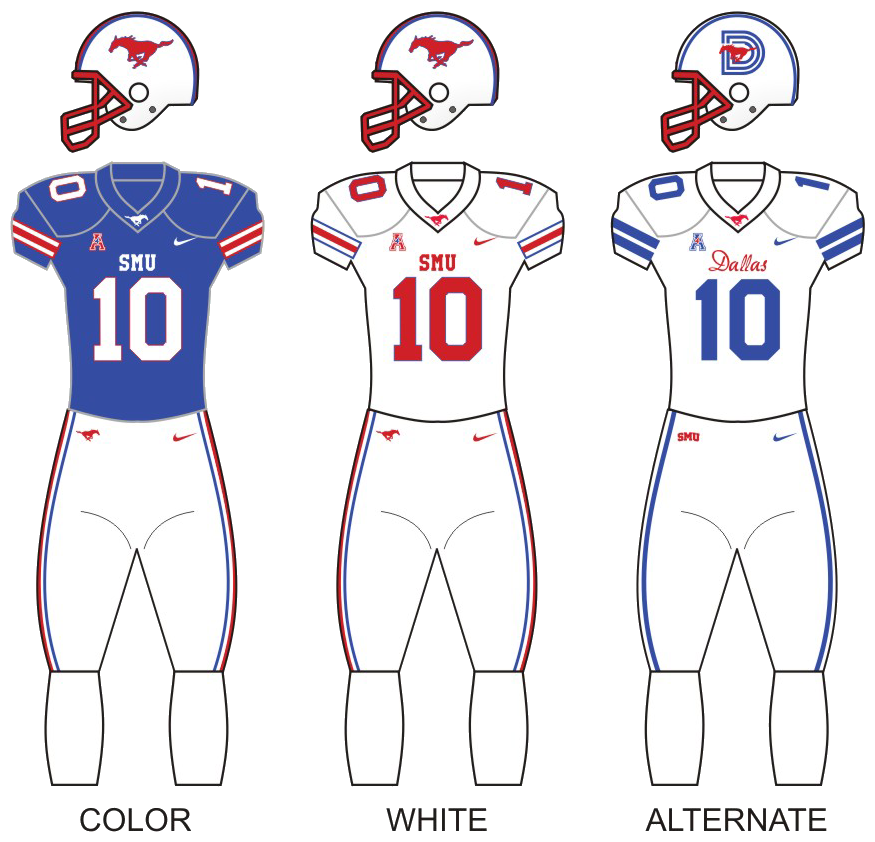

2021 American Athletic Conference football standings
	Conf.			Overall
Team	W		L	W		L
No. 4 Cincinnati y$^	8	–	0	13	–	1
No. 17 Houston y	8	–	0	12	–	2
UCF	5	–	3	9	–	4
East Carolina	5	–	3	7	–	5
Tulsa	5	–	3	7	–	6
SMU	4	–	4	8	–	4
Memphis	3	–	5	6	–	6
Navy	3	–	5	4	–	8
Tulane	1	–	7	2	–	10
South Florida	1	–	7	2	–	10
Temple	1	–	7	3	–	9
Championship: Cincinnati 35, Houston 20
^ – College Football Playoff participant; $ – Conference champion; y – Championship game participant; Rankings from AP Poll

The 2021 SMU Mustangs football team represented Southern Methodist University during the 2021 NCAA Division I FBS football season. The Mustangs played their home games at Gerald J. Ford Stadium in University Park, Texas, a separate city within the city limits of Dallas, competed as members of the American Athletic Conference (AAC). The Mustangs were led by fourth-year coach Sonny Dykes—on November 29, it was announced that Dykes would leave the program to become the head coach at TCU. He finished at SMU with an overall record of 30–18.

After finishing their regular season with an 8–4 record, the Mustangs accepted a bid to play in the Fenway Bowl, where they were due to face the Virginia Cavaliers. On December 26, the Cavaliers withdrew from the game, due to COVID-19 issues; the bowl was subsequently canceled.

== Preseason ==
=== Media poll ===
The American Athletic Conference preseason media poll was released at the virtual media day held August 4, 2021. Cincinnati, who finished the 2020 season ranked No. 8 nationally, was tabbed as the preseason favorite in the 2021 preseason media poll.

Media poll
Predicted finish	Team	Votes (1st place)
1	Cincinnati	262 (22)
2	UCF	241 (2)
3	SMU	188
4	Houston	181
5	Memphis	168
6	Tulsa	153
7	Tulane	132
T–8	East Carolina	85
T–8	Navy	85
10	Temple	46
11	South Florida	43

== Schedule ==
Date	Time	Opponent	Rank	Site	TV	Result	Attendance
September 4	6:00 p.m.	Abilene Christian*		Gerald J. Ford Stadium; University Park, TX	ESPN+	W 56–9	23,373
September 11	6:00 p.m.	North Texas*		Gerald J. Ford Stadium; University Park, TX (Safeway Bowl)	ESPN+	W 35–12	29,121
September 18	2:30 p.m.	at Louisiana Tech*		Joe Aillet Stadium; Ruston, LA	CBSSN	W 39–37	15,326
September 25	11:00 a.m.	at TCU*		Amon G. Carter Stadium; Fort Worth, TX (Battle for the Iron Skillet)	FS1	W 42–34	46,672
October 2	3:00 p.m.	South Florida^{†}		Gerald J. Ford Stadium; University Park, TX	ESPNU	W 41–17	23,355
October 9	2:30 p.m.	at Navy	No. 24	Navy–Marine Corps Memorial Stadium; Annapolis, MD (Gansz Trophy)	CBSSN	W 31–24	28,563
October 21	6:30 p.m.	Tulane	No. 21	Gerald J. Ford Stadium; University Park, TX	ESPN	W 55–26	22,843
October 30	6:00 p.m.	at Houston	No. 19	TDECU Stadium; Houston, TX (rivalry)	ESPN2	L 37–44	25,676
November 6	11:00 a.m.	at Memphis		Liberty Bowl Memorial Stadium; Memphis, TN	ESPNU	L 25–28	30,191
November 13	11:00 a.m.	UCF		Gerald J. Ford Stadium; University Park, TX	ESPNU	W 55–28	23,175
November 20	2:30 p.m.	at No. 5 Cincinnati		Nippert Stadium; Cincinnati, OH	ESPN	L 14–48	37,978
November 27	3:00 p.m.	Tulsa		Gerald J. Ford Stadium; University Park, TX	ESPN2	L 31–34	17,158
December 29	10:00 a.m.	vs. Virginia*		Fenway Park; Boston, MA (Fenway Bowl)	ESPN	Canceled	
*Non-conference game; ^{†}Homecoming; Rankings from AP Poll (and CFP Rankings, after November 2) - Released prior to game; All times are in Central time

== Personnel ==
2021 SMU Mustangs football team roster
Players
Coaches
Offense

Pos.	#	Name	Class
WR	1	Jordan Kerley	So
QB	2	Preston Stone	Fr
RB	4	Tre Siggers	Sr
WR	5	Danny Gray	Sr
WR	6	Austin Upshaw	Sr
RB	7	Ulysses Bentley IV	So
QB	8	Tanner Mordecai	Jr
WR	9	Beau Barker	So
WR	10	Dylan Goffney	Fr
WR	11	Rashee Rice	Jr
QB	12	Derek Green	Jr
WR	13	Roderick Daniels Jr.	Fr
TE	14	Nolan Matthews-Harris	So
QB	16	Josh Stupin	Fr
QB	18	Jacob Oehrlein	Jr
WR	20	Jayleen Record	Fr
WR	21	Reggie Roberson Jr.	Sr
RB	22	Brandon Epton	Fr
RB	25	T.J. McDaniel	So
RB	26	Montaye Dawson	Fr
RB	27	Zane Minors	Fr
RB	28	Blake Bedwell	Fr
WR	30	Carter Campbell	Fr
RB	31	Tyler Lavine	Jr
WR	33	Hudson Shrum	Jr
RB	39	Orlando Jones	Sr
WR	43	Charles Headen III	Sr
TE	44	Sam Morse	Fr
WR	47	Nic Heck	So
OL	51	Justin Osborne	So
OL	52	Marcus Bryant	So
OL	56	Branson Hickman	Fr
OL	57	Cobe Bryant	Sr
OL	58	Tai Brooks	So
OL	60	Henry Mossberg	Fr
OL	61	Dalton Perdue	Fr
OL	62	Marcus Smith	Fr
OL	64	Cameron Ervin	So
OL	67	Dylan Cordell	Fr
OL	68	Jackson Ritz	Fr
OL	69	Ben Sparks	Fr
OL	70	Thalen Robinson	So
OL	71	Jaylon Thomas	Sr
OL	74	Tyler Bailey	Fr
OL	75	Hayden Howerton	Sr
OL	76	Keaton Schulz	Fr
OL	77	Alan Ali	Sr
OL	78	Beau Morris	Sr
OL	79	Danielson Ike	So
TE	81	Ben Redding	Sr
WR	82	Parker Stone	So
TE	83	Simon Gonzalez	So
TE	86	Tommy McIntyre	Sr
TE	88	Grant Calcaterra	Sr
TE	89	Gage Haskin	Fr

Defense

Pos.	#	Name	Class
S	0	Bryan Massey	So
CB	1	Brandon Crossley	Jr
DB	2	Cam Jones	Jr
LB	3	Delano Robinson	Sr
CB	4	Jahari Rogers	Fr
CB	5	Ar'mani Johnson	Sr
S	6	T.Q. Jackson	So
CB	7	Bryce McMorris	Fr
LB	10	Ty DeArman	So
S	11	Chevin Calloway	Sr
S	12	Isaiah Nwokobia	Fr
S	13	Roderick Roberson Jr.	So
LB	14	Richard Moore	Sr
LB	15	Keke Burns	So
S	16	Trevor Denbow	Sr
S	18	Chace Cromartie	Jr
DB	20	Ra-Sun Kazadi	Jr
S	21	Donald Clay	So
DB	22	Karl Taylor	Fr
LB	23	Shaine Hailey	Sr
LB	24	Jimmy Phillips Jr.	Sr
LB	25	Izaiah Kelly	Fr
CB	26	Sam Westfall	Jr
LB	27	Ben Furgal	So
LB	30	Brian Holloway	Sr
LB	31	Preston Ellison	Sr
LB	32	Toby Ndukwe	Sr
DT	33	Junior Aho	Jr
CB	34	John Porter	Jr
LB	35	Nick Lerew	Jr
DB	36	Jadarius Thursby	Fr
LB	38	Carter Link	Fr
DT	39	Darren Brown	Jr
DE	40	Elijah Chatman	Jr
LB	41	Isaac Slade-Matautia	Jr
LB	42	Deuce Palmer	So
CB	43	Cross Kittrell	Fr
DL	44	Kadarius Smith	Sr
DE	45	Jayden Jones	Fr
LB	46	Trent Strong	Fr
DT	47	Stone Eby	Fr
LB	48	Will Benton	So
DE	49	Parker Forque	Fr
LB	50	Trevion Sneed	Fr
DE	51	Warren Walls	So
LB	53	Garrett Madison	So
DE	54	Christopher Reese	Sr
LB	55	Gary Wiley	Sr
LB	56	Jack Young	So
DT	57	Mike Williams	Sr
LB	59	Will Goldberg	So
DE	86	Je'lin Samuels	Fr
DE	89	Alex Sickafoose	So
DE	90	Nelson Paul	Jr
DT	91	Terrance Newman	Sr
DL	92	Stephon Wright	Jr
DE	93	Bobby Duncam	Fr
DL	94	Erin Smith	Fr
DE	95	Will Jones	Sr
DE	96	DeVere Levelston	Jr
LB	97	Turner Coxe	Sr
DL	98	Jay Bell	Sr
DE	99	Harrison Loveless	Sr

Special teams

Pos.	#	Name	Class
LS	46	Spencer Luce	Jr
LS	48	Will Benton	So
LS	49	Cole Voyles	Jr
LS	89	Gage Haskin	Fr
P	91	Matt Fraanje	Fr
K	92	Blake Mazza	Sr
K, P	93	Brendan Hall	Fr

Head coach

- Sonny Dykes (Texas Tech)

Coordinators/assistant coaches

- Jim Leavitt (Missouri) Defensive coordinator
- Garrett Riley (Texas Tech) Offensive coordinator/QB
- A. J. Ricker (Missouri) Co-offensive coordinator/OL
- Ra'Shaad Samples (Houston) Assistant head coach/Running backs
- David Gru (Louisiana Tech) Wide receivers
- Trey Haverty (Texas Tech) Safeties
- Josh Martin (Tarleton State) Tight ends
- Stefan McClure (California) Cornerbacks
- Kenny Perry (Houston) Special teams coordinator
- Chidera Uzo-Diribe (Colorado) Defensive line

Legend

- (C) Team captain
- (S) Suspended
- (I) Ineligible
- Injured
- Redshirt

Roster
Last update: September 17, 2021

=== Depth chart ===
†	As of September 17, 2021

Defense

FS
⋅
⋅
⋅

WLB	ILB	ILB	SLB
⋅	⋅	⋅	⋅
⋅	⋅	⋅	⋅
⋅	⋅	⋅	⋅

SS
⋅
⋅
⋅

CB
⋅
⋅
⋅

DE	NT	DE
⋅	⋅	⋅
⋅	⋅	⋅
⋅	⋅	⋅

CB
⋅
⋅
⋅

Offense

WR
Reggie Roberson Jr.
Jordan Kerley
⋅

WR
Danny Gray
Austin Upshaw
⋅

LT	LG	C	RG	RT
Jaylon Thomas	Hayden Howerton	Alan Ali	Justin Osborne	Marcus Bryant
Dalton Perdue	Cameron Ervin	Branson Hickman	Ben Sparks	Beau Morris
⋅	⋅	⋅	⋅	⋅

TE
Grant Calcaterra
Tommy McIntyre
Nolan Matthews

WR
Rashee Rice
Roderick Daniels Jr.
⋅

QB
Tanner Mordecai
Preston Stone
Derek Green

Special teams
PK Blake Mazza
PK Brendan Hall
P Matt Fraanje
P Brendan Hall
KR Ulysses Bentley IV
PR Jordan Kerley
LS Cole Voyles
H Derek Green

RB
Ulysses Bentley IV
Tre Siggers
Tyler Lavine

== Game summaries ==
=== Abilene Christian ===
Abilene Christian at Southern Methodist

Team	1	2	3	4	Total
Wildcats	0	3	6	0	9
• Mustangs	7	28	14	7	56

- Date: September 4
- Location: Gerald J. Ford Stadium
  University Park, TX
- Game start: 6:06 p.m. CDT
- Elapsed time: 3 hours and 21 minutes
- Game attendance: 23,373
- Game weather: Temperature: 95 °F (35 °C) • Weather: Sunny • Wind: SE 7 MPH
- Referee: Tim Rich
- TV announcers (ESPN+): Ted Emrich (play–by–play), Stanford Routt (analyst), and Morgan Uber (sideline)

Scoring summary
1	11:19	SMU	Grant Calcaterra 21–yard pass from Tanner Mordecai (Blake Mazza kick) (3 plays, 44 yards, 1:04)	SMU 7–0
2	10:55	SMU	Grant Calcaterra 8–yard pass from Tanner Mordecai (Blake Mazza kick) (11 plays, 68 yards, 4:51)	SMU 14–0
2	07:41	SMU	Danny Gray 30–yard pass from Tanner Mordecai (Blake Mazza kick) (5 plays, 64 yards, 1:47)	SMU 21–0
2	05:01	SMU	Danny Gray 27–yard pass from Tanner Mordecai (Blake Mazza kick) (4 plays, 31 yards, 1:16)	SMU 28–0
2	03:06	ACU	Blair Zepeda 47–yard field goal (5 plays, 60 yards, 1:50)	SMU 28–3
2	00:29	SMU	Rashee Rice 30–yard pass from Tanner Mordecai (Blake Mazza kick) (8 plays, 75 yards, 2:37)	SMU 35–3
3	10:33	SMU	Nolan Matthews 8–yard pass from Tanner Mordecai (Blake Mazza kick) (9 plays, 65 yards, 4:27)	SMU 42–3
3	04:38	ACU	Kobe Clark 11–yard pass from Stone Earle (pass failed) (16 plays, 75 yards, 5:55)	SMU 42–9
3	00:46	SMU	Nolan Matthews 31–yard pass from Tanner Mordecai (Blake Mazza kick) (9 plays, 75 yards, 3:52)	SMU 49–9
4	11:44	SMU	Brandon Epton Jr. 2–yard run (Brendan Hall kick) (1 play, 2 yards, 0:04)	SMU 56–9

Statistics	ACU	SMU
First downs	14	27
Total yards	332	490
Rushing yards	119	171
Passing yards	213	319
Turnovers	4	1
Time of possession	28:22	31:38

Team	Category	Player	Statistics
Abilene Christian	Passing	Stone Earle	13/28, 160 yards, TD, 2 INT
Abilene Christian	Rushing	Peyton Mansell	2 carries, 33 yards
Abilene Christian	Receiving	Kobe Clark	6 receptions, 89 yards, TD
SMU	Passing	Tanner Mordecai	24/30, 317 yards, 7 TD
SMU	Rushing	Ulysses Bentley IV	10 carries, 48 yards
SMU	Receiving	Danny Gray	4 receptions, 72 yards, 2 TD

=== North Texas ===
North Texas at Southern Methodist

Team	1	2	3	4	Total
Mean Green	3	3	6	0	12
• Mustangs	0	7	14	14	35

- Date: September 11
- Location: Gerald J. Ford Stadium
  University Park, TX
- Game start: 6:05 p.m. CDT
- Elapsed time: 3 hours and 57 minutes
- Game attendance: 29,121
- Game weather: Temperature: 88 °F (31 °C) • Weather: Sunny • Wind: E 10 MPH
- Referee: Jon Noli
- TV announcers (ESPN+): Ted Emrich (play–by–play), Stanford Routt (analyst), and Morgan Uber (sideline)

Scoring summary
1	09:29	UNT	Ethan Mooney 19–yard field goal (6 plays, 25 yards, 1:33)	UNT 3–0
2	13:52	UNT	Ethan Mooney 22–yard field goal (10 plays, 81 yards, 3:28)	UNT 6–0
2	03:50	SMU	Rashee Rice 62–yard pass from Tanner Mordecai (Blake Mazza kick) (2 plays, 63 yards, 0:41)	SMU 7–6
3	11:13	SMU	Danny Gray 58–yard pass from Tanner Mordecai (Blake Mazza kick) (3 plays, 81 yards, 0:55)	SMU 14–6
3	06:12	UNT	Isaiah Johnson 23–yard pass from Jace Ruder (DeAndre Torrey pass failed) (13 plays, 78 yards, 4:58)	SMU 14–12
3	05:01	SMU	Grant Calcaterra 29–yard pass from Tanner Mordecai (Blake Mazza kick) (4 plays, 77 yards, 1:06)	SMU 21–12
4	11:17	SMU	Ulysses Bentley IV 19–yard pass from Tanner Mordecai (Blake Mazza kick) (8 plays, 80 yards, 3:10)	SMU 28–12
4	07:37	SMU	Ulysses Bentley IV 85–yard rush (Blake Mazza kick) (1 play, 85 yards, 0:14)	SMU 35–12

Statistics	UNT	SMU
First downs	23	20
Total yards	506	536
Rushing yards	122	225
Passing yards	384	311
Turnovers	5	4
Time of possession	36:06	23:54

Team	Category	Player	Statistics
North Texas	Passing	Jace Ruder	32/51, 366 yards, TD, 2 INT
North Texas	Rushing	DeAndre Torrey	16 carries, 71 yards
North Texas	Receiving	Roderic Burns	12 receptions, 141 yards
SMU	Passing	Tanner Mordecai	21/33, 311 yards, 4 TD, 2 INT
SMU	Rushing	Ulysses Bentley IV	10 carries, 141 yards, TD
SMU	Receiving	Rashee Rice	4 receptions, 99 yards, TD

=== At Louisiana Tech ===
Southern Methodist at Louisiana Tech

Team	1	2	3	4	Total
• Mustangs	7	9	17	6	39
Bulldogs	7	7	14	9	37

- Date: September 18
- Location: Joe Aillet Stadium
  Ruston, LA
- Game start: 2:32 p.m. CDT
- Elapsed time: 3 hours and 49 minutes
- Game attendance: 15,326
- Game weather: 83 °F (28 °C) • Weather: Cloudy
- Referee: Patrick Foy
- TV announcers (CBS Sports Network): Chick Hernandez (play–by–play) and Ben Leber (analyst)

Scoring summary
1	06:22	LT	Tre Harris 62-yard pass from Austin Kendall (Jacob Barnes kick) (5 plays, 80 yards, 2:12)	LT 7–0
1	03:13	SMU	Rashee Rice 41-yard pass from Tanner Mordecai (Blake Mazza kick) (9 plays, 78 yards, 3:04)	TIE 7–7
2	06:49	LT	Samuel Emilus 11-yard pass from Austin Kendall (Jacob Barnes kick) (13 plays, 99 yards, 6:00)	LT 14–7
2	03:30	SMU	Danny Gray 17-yard pass from Tanner Mordecai (Blake Mazza PAT blocked) (9 plays, 75 yards, 3:19)	LT 14–13
2	00:00	SMU	Blake Mazza 29-yard field goal (10 plays, 46 yards, 2:17)	SMU 16–14
3	12:09	SMU	Jordan Kerley 18-yard pass from Tanner Mordecai (Blake Mazza kick) (7 plays, 78 yards, 2:42)	SMU 23–14
3	10:30	LT	Tre Harris 11-yard pass from Austin Kendall (Jacob Barnes kick) (5 plays, 75 yards, 1:39)	SMU 23–21
3	07:55	SMU	Blake Mazza 24-yard field goal (5 plays, 22 yards, 2:24)	SMU 26–21
3	05:25	LT	Austin Kendall 3-yard rush (Jacob Barnes kick) (6 plays, 75 yards, 2:30)	LT 28–26
3	00:24	SMU	Rashee Rice 5-yard pass from Tanner Mordecai (Blake Mazza kick) (3 plays, 9 yards, 0:54)	SMU 33–28
4	05:07	LT	Marcus Williams Jr. 6-yard pass from Austin Kendall (two-point pass conversion attempt failed) (9 plays, 70 yards, 4:13)	LT 34–33
4	00:36	LT	Jacob Barnes 47-yard field goal (6 plays, 6 yards, 2:42)	LT 37–33
4	00:00	SMU	Reggie Roberson Jr. 33-yard pass from Tanner Mordecai (6 plays, 73 yards, 0:36)	SMU 39–37

Statistics	SMU	LT
First downs	31	24
Total yards	578	483
Rushing yards	183	132
Passing yards	395	351
Turnovers	0	1
Time of possession	32:37	27:23

Team	Category	Player	Statistics
SMU	Passing	Tanner Mordecai	36/48, 395 yards, 5 TD
SMU	Rushing	Ulysses Bentley IV	13 carries, 61 yards
SMU	Receiving	Grant Calcaterra	7 receptions, 103 yards
Louisiana Tech	Passing	Austin Kendall	24/40, 351 yards, 4 TD, INT
Louisiana Tech	Rushing	Marcus Williams Jr.	13 carries, 65 yards
Louisiana Tech	Receiving	Tre Harris	5 receptions, 102 yards, 2 TD

=== At TCU ===
Southern Methodist at Texas Christian

Team	1	2	3	4	Total
• Mustangs	14	7	14	7	42
Horned Frogs	14	7	6	7	34

- Date: September 25
- Location: Amon G. Carter Stadium
  Fort Worth, TX
- Game start: 11:03 a.m. CDT
- Elapsed time: 3 hours and 18 minutes
- Game attendance: 46,672
- Game weather: Temperature: 78 °F (26 °C) • Weather: Sunny • Wind: SW 2 MPH
- Referee: Charles Lamertina
- TV announcers (FS1): Dan Hellie (play–by–play) and Robert Smith (analyst)

Scoring summary
1	14:08	SMU	Danny Gray 68-yard pass from Tanner Mordecai (Blake Mazza PAT failed) (3 plays, 77 yards, 0:46)	SMU 6–0
1	10:48	TCU	Kendre Miller 20-yard rush (Griffin Kell kick) (6 plays, 54 yards, 3:12)	TCU 7–6
1	08:44	SMU	Tanner Mordecai 4-yard rush (Ben Redding two-point conversion rush) (6 plays, 75 yards, 2:04)	SMU 14–7
1	07:14	TCU	Derius Davis 13-yard pass from Max Duggan (Griffin Kell kick) (3 plays, 75 yards, 1:30)	TIE 14–14
2	13:31	TCU	Zach Evans 46-yard pass from Max Duggan (Griffin Kell kick) (6 plays, 86 yards, 2:23)	TCU 21–14
2	10:49	SMU	Reggie Roberson Jr. 29-yard pass from Tanner Mordecai (Blake Mazza kick) (7 plays, 75 yards, 2:42)	TIE 21–21
3	14:19	SMU	Ulysses Bentley IV 1-yard rush (Blake Mazza kick) (2 plays, 3 yards, 0:25)	SMU 28–21
3	10:27	TCU	Griffin Kell 40-yard field goal (8 plays, 43 yards, 3:45)	SMU 28–24
3	07:09	SMU	Rashee Rice 11-yard pass from Tanner Mordecai (Blake Mazza kick) (8 plays, 75 yards, 3:18)	SMU 35–24
3	00:22	TCU	Griffin Kell 30-yard field goal (4 plays, 3 yards, 1:00)	SMU 35–27
4	12:19	SMU	Jordan Kerley 26-yard pass from Tanner Mordecai (Blake Mazza kick) (7 plays, 75 yards, 3:03)	SMU 42–27
4	04:05	TCU	Taye Barber 21-yard pass from Max Duggan (Griffin Kell kick) (7 plays, 91 yards, 1:45)	SMU 42–34

Statistics	SMU	TCU
First downs	29	20
Total yards	595	446
Rushing yards	350	170
Passing yards	245	276
Turnovers	3	1
Time of possession	33:52	26:08

Team	Category	Player	Statistics
SMU	Passing	Tanner Mordecai	17/28, 245 yards, 4 TD, 3 INT
SMU	Rushing	Ulysses Bentley IV	20 rushes, 153 yards, TD
SMU	Receiving	Danny Gray	4 receptions, 130 yards, TD
TCU	Passing	Max Duggan	16/28, 276 yards, 3 TD
TCU	Rushing	Zach Evans	15 rushes, 113 yards
TCU	Receiving	Taye Barber	5 receptions, 114 yards, TD

=== South Florida ===
South Florida at Southern Methodist

Team	1	2	3	4	Total
Bulls	0	3	14	0	17
• Mustangs	10	7	10	14	41

- Date: October 2
- Location: Gerald J. Ford Stadium
  University Park, TX
- Game start: 3:00 p.m. CDT
- Elapsed time: 3:21
- Game attendance: 23,355
- Game weather: Temperature: 84 °F (29 °C) • Weather: Cloudy • Wind: W 8 MPH
- Referee: Edwin Lee
- TV announcers (ESPNU): Mike Couzens (play-by-play) and Dustin Fox (analyst)

Scoring summary
1	10:50	SMU	Reggie Roberson Jr. 21-yard pass from Tanner Mordecai (Blake Mazza kick) (12 plays, 75 yards, 4:10)	SMU 7–0
1	4:40	SMU	Blake Mazza 26-yard field goal (11 plays, 65 yards, 4:21)	SMU 10–0
2	12:05	SMU	Rashee Rice 10-yard pass from Tanner Mordecai (Blake Mazza kick) (13 plays, 97 yards, 4:41)	SMU 17–0
2	4:37	USF	Spencer Shrader 29-yard field goal (14 plays, 63 yards, 7:28)	SMU 17–3
3	12:50	USF	Jaren Mangham 1-yard run (Spencer Shrader kick) (7 plays, 75 yards, 2:10)	SMU 17–10
3	8:56	SMU	Blake Mazza 30-yard field goal (11 plays, 63 yards, 3:54)	SMU 20–10
3	4:25	SMU	Tre Siggers 13-yard run (Blake Mazza kick) (5 plays, 58 yards, 2:30)	SMU 27–10
3	0:29	USF	Jaren Mangham 1-yard run (Spencer Shrader kick) (10 plays, 75 yards, 3:56)	SMU 27–17
4	9:32	SMU	Danny Gray 4-yard pass from Tanner Mordecai (Blake Mazza kick) (4 plays, 50 yards, 1:44)	SMU 34–17
4	5:09	SMU	Danny Gray 5-yard pass from Tanner Mordecai (Blake Mazza kick) (6 plays, 30 yards, 3:04)	SMU 41–17

Statistics	USF	SMU
First downs	19	30
Total yards	336	463
Rushing yards	113	162
Passing yards	223	301
Turnovers	1	1
Time of possession	27:11	32:49

Team	Category	Player	Statistics
South Florida	Passing	Timmy McClain	14/22, 223 yards
South Florida	Rushing	Brian Battie	7 rushes, 46 yards
South Florida	Receiving	Jimmy Horn Jr.	5 receptions, 102 yards
SMU	Passing	Tanner Mordecai	29/42, 301 yards, 4 TD, INT
SMU	Rushing	Tre Siggers	20 rushes, 86 yards, TD
SMU	Receiving	Danny Gray	7 receptions, 74 yards, 2 TD

=== At Navy ===
Southern Methodist at Navy

Team	1	2	3	4	Total
• No. 24 Mustangs	7	14	3	7	31
Midshipmen	7	14	3	0	24

- Date: October 9
- Location: Navy–Marine Corps Memorial Stadium
  Annapolis, MD
- Game start: 2:30 p.m. CDT
- Elapsed time: 3:05
- Game attendance: 28,563
- Game weather: Temperature: 72 °F (22 °C) • Weather: Partly cloudy • Wind: SE 10 MPH
- Referee: Luke Richmond
- TV announcers (CBSSN): John Sadak (play-by-play), Randy Cross (analyst), and Sheehan Stanwick Burch (sideline)

Scoring summary
1	13:28	SMU	Reggie Roberson Jr. 66-yard pass from Tanner Mordecai (Blake Mazza kick) (4 plays, 75 yards, 1:32)	SMU 7–0
1	3:57	NAVY	Chance Warren 28-yard run (Bijan Nichols kick) (7 plays, 50 yards, 3:37)	TIE 7–7
2	13:45	NAVY	Kai Puailoa-Rojas 37-yard pass from Tai Lavatai (Bijan Nichols kick) (6 plays, 71 yards, 2:51)	NAVY 14–7
2	7:42	NAVY	Diego Fagot 20-yard fumble return (Nijan Nichols kick)	NAVY 21–7
2	7:29	SMU	Bryan Massey 95-yard kickoff return (Blake Mazza kick)	NAVY 21–14
2	1:54	SMU	Tre Siggers 2-yard run (Blake Mazza kick) (11 plays, 69 yards, 4:04)	TIE 21–21
3	7:26	SMU	Blake Mazza 37-yard field goal (9 plays, 36 yards, 4:02)	SMU 24–21
3	0:23	NAVY	Bijan Nichols 50-yard field goal (13 plays, 42 yards, 7:03)	TIE 24–24
4	8:19	SMU	Jordan Kerley 22-yard pass from Tanner Mordecai (Blake Mazza kick); 9 plays, 65 yards, 3:52)	SMU 31–24

Statistics	SMU	NAVY
First downs	22	12
Total yards	404	241
Rushing yards	80	177
Passing yards	324	64
Turnovers	2	0
Time of possession	27:41	32:19

Team	Category	Player	Statistics
SMU	Passing	Tanner Mordecai	30/40, 324 yards, 2 TD, INT
SMU	Rushing	Tre Siggers	14 rushes, 49 yards, TD
SMU	Receiving	Reggie Roberson Jr.	5 receptions, 100 yards, TD
Navy	Passing	Tai Lavatai	4/7, 64 yards, TD
Navy	Rushing	Tai Lavatai	24 rushes, 53 yards
Navy	Receiving	Kai Puailoa-Rojas	1 reception, 37 yards, TD

=== Tulane ===
Tulane at Southern Methodist

Team	1	2	3	4	Total
Green Wave	7	0	12	7	26
• No. 21 Mustangs	17	14	7	17	55

- Date: October 21
- Location: Gerald J. Ford Stadium
  University Park, TX
- Game start: 6:30 p.m. CDT
- Elapsed time: 3:24
- Game attendance: 22,843
- Game weather: Temperature: 79 °F (26 °C) • Weather: Sunny • Wind: NE 6 MPH
- Referee: Hank Jones
- TV announcers (ESPN): Matt Barrie (play-by-play), Roddy Jones (analyst), and Harry Lyles, Jr. (sideline)

Scoring summary
1	9:56	SMU	Blake Mazza 22-yard field goal (14 plays, 50 yards, 5:04)	SMU 3–0
1	6:08	SMU	Tre Siggers 1-yard run (Blake Mazza kick) (6 plays, 81 yards, 2:30)	SMU 10–0
1	1:04	SMU	Tanner Mordecai 1-yard run (Blake Mazza kick) (11 plays, 88 yards, 3:07)	SMU 17–0
1	0:22	TULN	Shae Wyatt 10-yard pass from Michael Pratt (Merek Glover kick) (3 plays, 75 yards, 0:42)	SMU 17–7
2	13:25	SMU	Tommy McIntyre 24-yard pass from Tanner Mordecai (Blake Mazza kick) (6 plays, 96 yards, 1:57)	SMU 24–7
2	0:53	SMU	Reggie Roberson Jr. 22-yard pass from Tanner Mordecai (Blake Mazza kick) (9 plays, 91 yards, 4:24)	SMU 31–7
3	12:18	TULN	Shae Wyatt 11-yard pass from Michael Pratt (pass failed) (7 plays, 75 yards, 2:42)	SMU 31–13
3	3:33	SMU	Tre Siggers 9-yard run (Blake Mazza kick) (11 plays, 91 yards, 5:04)	SMU 38–13
3	1:28	TULN	Duece Watts 4-yard pass from Michael Pratt (pass failed) (6 plays, 75 yards, 2:05)	SMU 38–19
4	9:05	SMU	Blake Mazza 38-yard field goal (6 plays, 13 yards, 3:56)	SMU 41–19
4	6:50	TULN	Tyjae Spears 9-yard run (Merek Glover kick) (8 plays, 82 yards, 2:15)	SMU 41–26
4	6:01	SMU	Tyler Lavine 44-yard pass from Tanner Mordecai (Blake Mazza kick) (2 plays, 44 yards, 0:49)	SMU 48–26
4	2:39	SMU	Brandon Epton Jr. 9-yard run (Blake Mazza kick) (6 plays, 37 yards, 2:47)	SMU 55–26

Statistics	TULN	SMU
First downs	18	31
Total yards	428	612
Rushing yards	194	174
Passing yards	234	438
Turnovers	1	0
Time of possession	25:37	34:23

Team	Category	Player	Statistics
Tulane	Passing	Michael Pratt	11/22, 234 yards, 3 TD
Tulane	Rushing	Tyjae Spears	14 rushes, 85 yards, TD
Tulane	Receiving	Jha'Quan Jackson	2 receptions, 93 yards
SMU	Passing	Tanner Mordecai	30/42, 427 yards, 3 TD
SMU	Rushing	Tre Siggers	15 rushes, 81 yards, 2 TD
SMU	Receiving	Danny Gray	8 receptions, 140 yards

=== At Houston ===
Southern Methodist at Houston

Team	1	2	3	4	Total
No. 19 Mustangs	7	13	14	3	37
• Cougars	17	6	7	14	44

- Date: October 30
- Location: TDECU Stadium
  Houston, TX
- Game start: 6:00 p.m. CDT
- Elapsed time: 3:37
- Game attendance: 25,676
- Game weather: Temperature: 74 °F (23 °C) • Weather: Sunny • Wind: NW 6 MPH
- Referee: Charles Lamertina
- TV announcers (ESPN2): Taylor Zarzour (play-by-play), Matt Stinchcomb (analyst), and Alyssa Lang (sideline)

Scoring summary
1	11:20	HOU	Nathaniel Dell 7-yard pass from Clayton Tune (Dalton Witherspoon kick) (9 plays, 78 yards, 3:40)	HOU 7–0
1	9:26	HOU	Nathaniel Dell 48-yard pass from Clayton Tune (Dalton Witherspoon kick) (2 plays, 56 yards, 0:33)	HOU 14–0
1	2:20	HOU	Dalton Witherspoon 50-yard field goal (9 plays, 55 yards, 4:32)	HOU 17–0
1	0:00	SMU	Jordan Kerley 43-yard pass from Tanner Mordecai (Blake Mazza kick) (7 plays, 75 yards, 2:20	HOU 17–7
2	11:41	HOU	Dalton Witherspoon 23-yard field goal (7 plays, 69 yards, 3:19)	HOU 20–7
2	7:28	SMU	Tre Siggers 50-yard pass from Tanner Mordecai (Blake Mazza kick) (1 play, 50 yards, 0:09)	HOU 20–14
2	2:45	SMU	Rashee Rice 6-yard pass from Tanner Mordecai (kick blocked) (7 plays, 35 yards, 3:07)	TIE 20–20
2	0:00	HOU	Dalton Witherspoon 30-yard field goal (12 plays, 62 yards, 2:45)	HOU 23–20
3	14:45	SMU	Bryan Massey 100-yard kickoff return (Blake Mazza kick)	SMU 27–23
3	9:22	HOU	Nathaniel Dell 17-yard pass from Clayton Tune (Dalton Witherspoon kick) (11 plays, 72 yards, 5:23)	HOU 30–27
3	5:46	SMU	Tre Siggers 2-yard run (Blake Mazza kick) (8 plays, 75 yards, 3:36)	SMU 34–30
4	13:36	HOU	KeSean Carter 4-yard pass from Clayton Tune (Dalton Witherspoon kick) (14 plays, 75 yards, 7:10)	HOU 37–34
4	0:30	SMU	Blake Mazza 45-yard field goal (10 plays, 58 yards, 1:34)	TIE 37–37
4	0:17	HOU	Marcus Jones 100-yard kickoff return (Dalton Witherspoon kick)	HOU 44–37

Statistics	SMU	HOU
First downs	18	23
Total yards	355	489
Rushing yards	50	77
Passing yards	305	412
Turnovers	1	1
Time of possession	24:22	35:23

Team	Category	Player	Statistics
SMU	Passing	Tanner Mordecai	24/37, 305 yards, 3 TD, INT
SMU	Rushing	Tre Siggers	13 rushes, 44 yards, TD
SMU	Receiving	Danny Gray	5 receptions, 73 yards
Houston	Passing	Clayton Tune	27/37, 412 yards, 4 TD
Houston	Rushing	Ta'Zhawn Henry	21 rushes, 49 yards
Houston	Receiving	Nathaniel Dell	9 receptions, 165 yards, 3 TD

=== At Memphis ===
Southern Methodist at Memphis

Team	1	2	3	4	Total
Mustangs	0	10	0	15	25
• Tigers	0	7	14	7	28

- Date: November 6
- Location: Liberty Bowl Memorial Stadium
  Memphis, TN
- Game start: 11:00 a.m. CDT
- Elapsed time: 3:14
- Game attendance: 30,191
- Game weather: Temperature: 54 °F (12 °C) • Weather: Sunny • Wind: 0 MPH
- Referee: Luke Richmond
- TV announcers (ESPNU): John Schriffen (play-by-play) and Rene Ingoglia (analyst)

Scoring summary
2	1:57	SMU	Danny Gray 48-yard pass from Tanner Mordecai (Blake Mazza kick) (6 plays, 80 yards, 2:25)	SMU 7–0
2	0:16	MEM	Eddie Lewis 2-yard pass from Seth Henigan (Joe Doyle kick) (8 plays, 75 yards, 1:41)	TIE 7–7
2	0:00	SMU	Blake Mazza 47-yard field goal (2 plays, 26 yards, 0:00)	SMU 10–7
3	8:47	MEM	Asa Martin 1-yard run (Joe Doyle kick) (5 plays, 41 yards, 2:33)	MEM 14–10
3	2:41	MEM	Javon Ivory 27-yard pass from Seth Henigan (Joe Doyle kick) (11 plays, 90 yards, 2:53)	MEM 21–10
4	11:01	MEM	Sean Dykes 40-yard pass from Seth Henigan (Joe Doyle kick) (9 plays, 71 yards, 5:15)	MEM 28–10
4	8:36	SMU	Danny Gray 27-yard pass from Tanner Mordecai (Tanner Mordecai pass to Rashee Rice) (8 plays, 66 yards, 2:18)	MEM 28–18
4	5:53	SMU	Tyler Levine 1-yard run (Blake Mazza kick) (5 plays, 32 yards, 1:19)	MEM 28–25

Statistics	SMU	MEM
First downs	16	25
Total yards	323	468
Rushing yards	61	36
Passing yards	262	432
Turnovers	3	1
Time of possession	23:05	36:55

Team	Category	Player	Statistics
SMU	Passing	Tanner Mordecai	19/28, 262 yards, 2 TD, INT
SMU	Rushing	Tre Siggers	12 rushes, 53 yards
SMU	Receiving	Danny Gray	4 receptions, 98 yards, 2 TD
Memphis	Passing	Seth Henigan	34/53, 392 yards, 2 TD, INT
Memphis	Rushing	Marquavius Weaver	10 rushes, 17 yards
Memphis	Receiving	Calvin Austin	8 receptions, 88 yards

=== UCF ===
Central Florida at Southern Methodist

Team	1	2	3	4	Total
Knights	14	0	7	7	28
• Mustangs	21	17	7	10	55

- Date: November 13
- Location: Gerald J. Ford Stadium
  University Park, TX
- Game start: 11:00 a.m. CST
- Elapsed time: 3:27
- Game attendance: 23,175
- Game weather: Temperature: 56 °F (13 °C) • Weather: Sunny • Wind: SW 2 MPH MPH
- Referee: Hank Johns
- TV announcers (ESPNU): John Schriffen (play-by-play) and Rene Ingoglia (analyst)

Scoring summary
1	13:23	UCF	Ryan O'Keefe 18-yard pass from Mikey Keene (Daniel Obarski kick) (4 plays, 32 yards, 0:31)	UCF 7–0
1	10:38	SMU	Grant Calcaterra 15-yard pass from Tanner Mordecai (Blake Mazza kick) (8 plays, 84 yards, 2:37)	TIE 7–7
1	5:33	UCF	Parker Navarro 6-yard run (Daniel Obarski kick) (3 plays, 15 yards, 1:05)	UCF 14–7
1	4:32	SMU	Ulysses Bentley IV 56-yard run (Blake Mazza kick) (3 plays, 69 yards, 1:01)	TIE 14–14
1	0:12	SMU	Tre Siggers 10-yard run (Blake Mazza kick) (9 plays, 62 yards, 3:17)	SMU 21–14
2	8:16	SMU	Blake Mazza 29-yard field goal (12 plays, 64 yards, 4:00)	SMU 24–14
2	5:00	SMU	Tre Siggers 16-yard run (Blake Mazza kick) (5 plays, 51 yards, 1:21)	SMU 31–14
2	1:01	SMU	Rashee Rice 8-yard pass from Tanner Mordecai (Blake Mazza kick) (11 plays, 85 yards, 2:41)	SMU 38–14
3	12:47	UCF	Mark-Antony Richards 58-yard run (Daniel Obarski kick) (5 plays, 75 yards, 2:13)	SMU 38–21
3	3:23	SMU	Reggie Roberson Jr. 24-yard pass from Tanner Mordecai (Blake Mazza kick) (7 plays, 88 yards, 2:13)	SMU 45–21
4	14:22	SMU	Tre Siggers 4-yard run (Blake Mazza kick) (9 plays, 35 yards, 3:38)	SMU 52–21
4	12:10	UCF	Mark-Antony Richards 4-yard run (Daniel Obarski kick) (7 plays, 75 yards, 2:12)	SMU 52–28
4	8:17	SMU	Blake Mazza 43-yard field goal (8 plays, 50 yards, 3:53)	SMU 55–28

Statistics	UCF	SMU
First downs	15	36
Total yards	333	631
Rushing yards	124	241
Passing yards	209	390
Turnovers	1	1
Time of possession	26:11	33:49

Team	Category	Player	Statistics
UCF	Passing	Mikey Keene	18/35, 174 yards, TD
UCF	Rushing	Mark-Antony Richards	8 rushes, 104 yards, 2 TD
UCF	Receiving	Jaylon Robinson	2 receptions, 50 yards
SMU	Passing	Tanner Mordecai	37/54, 377 yards, 3 TD, INT
SMU	Rushing	Ulysses Bentley IV	14 rushes, 97 yards, TD
SMU	Receiving	Dylan Goffney	10 receptions, 88 yards

=== At No. 5 Cincinnati ===
Southern Methodist at Cincinnati

Team	1	2	3	4	Total
Mustangs	0	0	0	14	14
• No. 5 Bearcats	14	13	14	7	48

- Date: November 20
- Location: Nippert Stadium
  Cincinnati, OH
- Game start: 2:30 p.m. CST
- Elapsed time: 3:19
- Game attendance: 37,978
- Game weather: Temperature: 49 °F (9 °C) • Weather: Cloudy • Wind: SW 8 MPH
- Referee: Charles Lamertina
- TV announcers (ESPN): Bob Wischusen (play-by-play), Dan Orlovsky (analyst), and Kris Budden (sideline)

Scoring summary
1	12:54	CIN	Tyler Scott 53-yard pass from Desmond Ridder (Alex Bales kick) (1 play, 53 yards, 0:07)	CIN 7–0
1	5:32	CIN	Jerome Ford 4-yard run (Alex Bales kick) (6 plays, 25 yards, 2:58)	CIN 14–0
2	13:37	CIN	Desmond Ridder 40-yard run (kick failed) (6 plays, 78 yards, 3:02)	CIN 20–0
2	8:19	CIN	Alec Pierce 17-yard pass from Desmond Ridder (Alex Bales kick) (8 plays, 71 yards, 3:40)	CIN 27–0
3	10:59	CIN	Desmond Ridder 5-yard pass from Jordan Jones (Alex Bales kick) (7 plays, 92 yards, 4:01)	CIN 34–0
3	5:44	CIN	Alec Pierce 17-yard pass from Desmond Ridder (Alex Bales kick) (8 plays, 42 yards, 3:59)	CIN 41–0
4	11:06	CIN	Jordan Jones 11-yard pass from Evan Prater (Alex Bales kick) (12 plays, 74 yards, 6:22)	CIN 48–0
4	8:32	SMU	Tre Siggers 2-yard run (Blake Mazza kick) (6 plays, 63 yards, 2:34)	CIN 48–7
4	1:17	SMU	Rashee Rice 3-yard pass from Tanner Mordecai (Blake Mazza kick) (9 plays, 46 yards, 3:43)	CIN 48–14

Statistics	SMU	CIN
First downs	15	24
Total yards	199	544
Rushing yards	133	249
Passing yards	66	295
Turnovers	1	0
Time of possession	24:39	35:21

Team	Category	Player	Statistics
SMU	Passing	Tanner Mordecai	15/26, 66 yards, TD
SMU	Rushing	Ulysses Bentley IV	11 rushes, 68 yards
SMU	Receiving	Rashee Rice	7 receptions, 21 yards, TD
Cincinnati	Passing	Desmond Ridder	17/23, 274 yards, 3 TD
Cincinnati	Rushing	Jerome Ford	19 rushes, 82 yards, TD
Cincinnati	Receiving	Tre Tucker	7 receptions, 114 yards

=== Tulsa ===
Tulsa at Southern Methodist

Team	1	2	3	4	Total
• Golden Hurricane	0	14	14	6	34
Mustangs	10	7	0	14	31

- Date: November 27
- Location: Gerald J. Ford Stadium
  University Park, TX
- Game start: 3:00 p.m. CST
- Game attendance: 17,158
- TV announcers (ESPN2): Beth Mowins (play-by-play), Kirk Morrison (analyst), and Dawn Davenport (sideline)

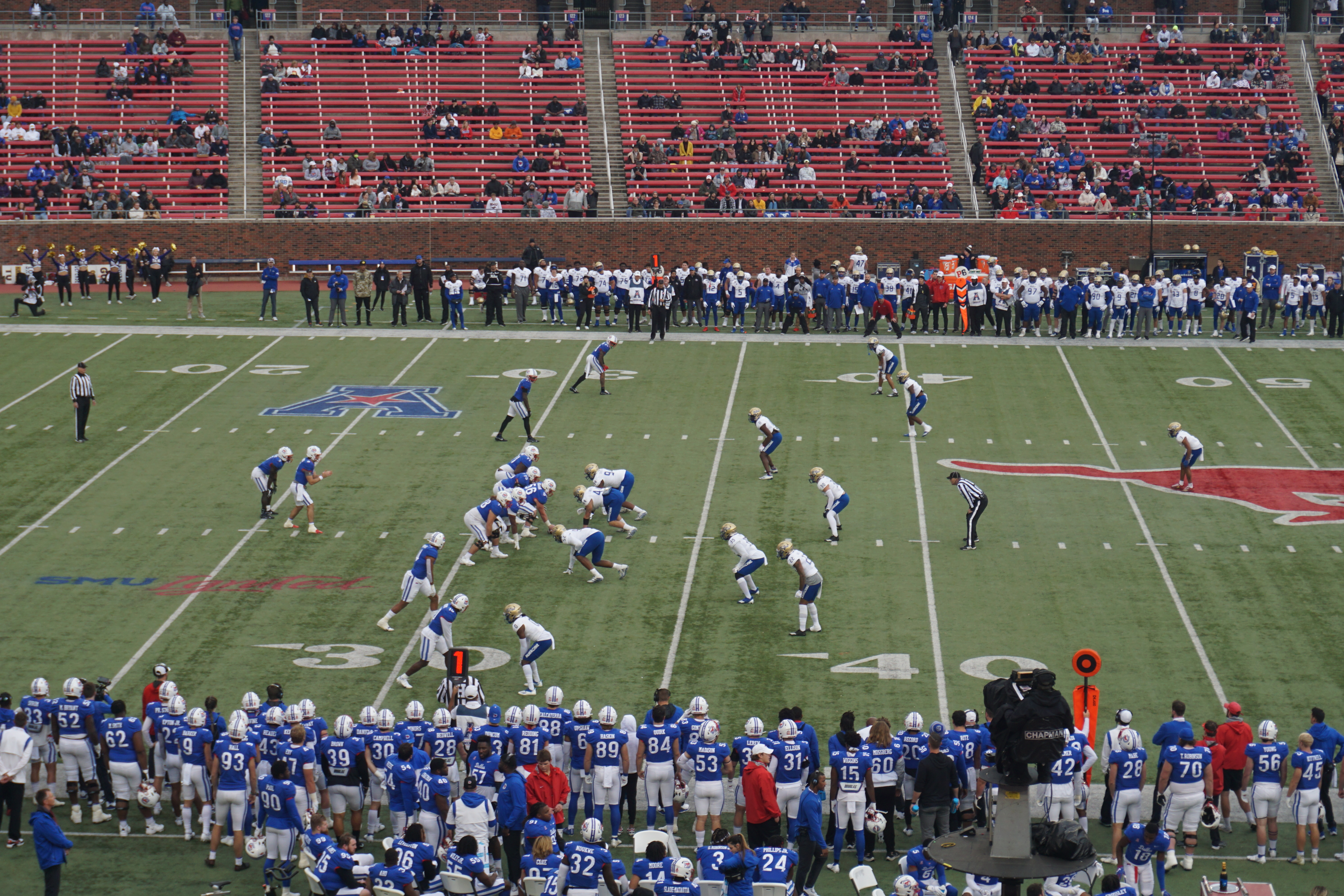
SMU in action against Tulsa

Statistics	TLSA	SMU
First downs	22	23
Total yards	374	405
Rushing yards	130	107
Passing yards	244	298
Turnovers	2	2
Time of possession	31:12	28:48

Team	Category	Player	Statistics
Tulsa	Passing	Davis Brin	18/33, 244 yards, TD, 2 INT
Tulsa	Rushing	Shamari Brooks	18 rushes, 71 yards
Tulsa	Receiving	Josh Johnson	6 receptions, 117 yards, TD
SMU	Passing	Tanner Mordecai	26/46, 298 yards, TD, 2 INT
SMU	Rushing	Tyler Lavine	8 rushes, 51 yards, TD
SMU	Receiving	Roderick Daniels Jr.	3 receptions, 96 yards, TD

== Rankings ==
Ranking movements Legend: ██ Increase in ranking ██ Decrease in ranking — = Not ranked RV = Received votes
	Week															
Poll	Pre	1	2	3	4	5	6	7	8	9	10	11	12	13	14	Final
AP	—	—	—	—	RV	24	23	21	19	23	RV	RV	—	—	—	
Coaches	RV	RV	RV	RV	RV	24	23	19	16	24	RV	RV	—	—	—	
CFP	Not released									—	—	—	—	—	—	Not released

== Weekly awards ==
- The American offensive player of the week

Tanner Mordecai (week 1 vs. Abilene Christian)
Tanner Mordecai (week 3 vs. Louisiana Tech)
Tanner Mordecai (week 8 vs. Tulane)
Tanner Mordecai (week 11 vs. UCF)

- The American special teams player of the week

Bryan Massey (week 5 vs. Navy)
