= D'Wan Mathis =

American football player (born 2000)

No. 14 – Tucson Sugar Skulls
- Position: Quarterback

Personal information
- Born: December 21, 2000 (age 25); Oak Park, Michigan, U.S.
- Listed height: 6 ft 6 in (1.98 m)
- Listed weight: 210 lb (95 kg)

Career information
- High school: Oak Park
- College: Georgia (2019–2020); Temple (2021–2023); Davenport (2024–2025)
- NFL draft: 2026: undrafted

Career history
- Tucson Sugar Skulls (2026–present)
- Stats at ESPN

D'Wan Terence Mathis (born July 17, 2000) is an American professional football quarterback for the Tucson Sugar Skulls of the Indoor Football League (IFL). He played college football for the Georgia Bulldogs, Temple Owls, and Davenport Panthers.

== Early life ==
Mathis attended Oak Park High School in Oak Park, Michigan. He was rated as a consensus four-star recruit. In December 2018, Mathis announced his commitment to the University of Georgia, over offers from Ohio State and Michigan State. In his senior season, he threw for over 1,000 yards and 20 touchdowns.

== College career ==
=== Georgia ===
During Mathis's freshman year he underwent emergency surgery due to a brain cyst. He subsequently received a medical redshirt.

After Jake Fromm decided to forgo his senior season to prepare for the NFL draft and Jamie Newman opted out of the season due to concerns surrounding the COVID-19 pandemic, Mathis was expected to compete for the starting job. He got the start in their opening game at Arkansas. After a disappointing first half, Stetson Bennett came in and took his spot. The next time Mathis got meaningful playing time was against rival Florida. On November 28, 2020, Mathis left the team and entered the transfer portal. On December 14, he announced he would be transferring to Temple.

=== Temple ===
In his first season with Temple, Mathis was named the day one starter against Rutgers. In the season opener, Mathis went 8-for-24 for 148 yards and one interception in a 61–14 loss. Throughout the season, Mathis shared time with fellow Temple quarterback Justin Lynch. In a game against Memphis, Mathis had a record-setting day completing 35 passes for 322 yards and three touchdowns. Mathis finished the season with six touchdowns, 1,223 yards, and 116 completions. During the season it was rumored that Mathis had left the Owl's program, but he later publicly announced he would be staying with the team.

The following season, Mathis was once again named the starting quarterback. Mathis passed for 83 yards on 11 completions in a 30–0 loss to Duke. The following week, Mathis was benched in favor of true freshman E.J. Warner. Subsequently, Mathis began taking practice reps at wide receiver, before switching positions.

On October 15, 2023, Mathis announced that he would enter the transfer portal for the second time.

=== Davenport ===
On February 8, 2024, Mathis transferred to Davenport University to play for the Davenport Panthers.

=== College statistics ===
Year	Team	Games	Passing								Rushing				Receiving			
Year	Team	GP	Comp	Att	Pct	Yards	Avg	TD	Int	Rate	Att	Yards	Avg	TD	Rec	Yds	Avg	TD
2019	Georgia	Redshirt (redshirt)																
2020	Georgia	3	12	30	40.0	89	3.0	1	3	55.9	18	17	0.9	0	–	–	–	–
2021	Temple	7	116	195	59.5	1,223	6.3	6	4	118.2	48	82	1.7	1	–	–	–	–
2022	Temple	9	14	30	46.7	125	4.2	0	0	81.7	12	8	0.7	0	6	44	7.3	0
2023	Temple	3	–	–	–	–	–	–	–	–	–	–	–	–	2	12	6.0	0
2024	Davenport	7	45	76	55.0	580	8.5	3	2	–	43	112	3.4	1	–	–	–	–
2025	Davenport	8	95	157	61.0	1,328	–	9	5	–	73	280	3.8	2	–	–	–	–
Career		29	188	331	55.7	2,017	5.6	10	9	106.7	121	219	1.4	2	8	56	7.0	0

== Professional career ==
After going unselected in the 2026 NFL draft, Mathis joined the Tucson Sugar Skulls of the Indoor Football League on June 11, 2026.
