= Danny Gray (American football) =

American football player (born 1999)

Profile
- Position: Wide receiver

Personal information
- Born: April 1, 1999 (age 27); Ruston, Louisiana, U.S.
- Listed height: 6 ft 0 in (1.83 m)
- Listed weight: 200 lb (91 kg)

Career information
- High school: James Madison (Dallas, Texas)
- College: Blinn (2018–2019); SMU (2020–2021)
- NFL draft: 2022: 3rd round, 105th overall pick

Career history
- San Francisco 49ers (2022–2023); Philadelphia Eagles (2024–2026)*
- * Offseason or practice squad member only

Awards and highlights
- Super Bowl champion (LIX); First-team All-AAC (2021)

Career NFL statistics as of 2025
- Receptions: 1
- Receiving yards: 10
- Stats at Pro Football Reference

Danny Gray (born April 1, 1999) is an American professional football wide receiver. He played college football at Blinn College and for the SMU Mustangs before being selected by the San Francisco 49ers in the third round of the 2022 NFL draft.

== Early life ==
Gray grew up in Dallas, Texas and attended James Madison High School. As a junior, he had 34 receptions for 699 yards and 13 touchdowns and rushed for 159 yards and three touchdowns. Gray was rated a three-star recruit and committed to play college football for the Missouri Tigers over offers from Kansas, Bowling Green, Florida Atlantic, Grambling State, Tulane, Stephen F. Austin, North Texas and Incarnate Word. He was ruled academically ineligible to play at Missouri and did not enroll.

== College career ==
Gray began his collegiate career at Blinn College in order to meet the academic requirements to play Division I football. As a freshman, he caught 15 passes for 409 yards and six touchdowns and was named first-team All-Southwest Junior College Football Conference. Gray initially committed to transfer to TCU over offers from Auburn, Baylor, Texas Tech, and Tennessee for his final two seasons of eligibility during the summer before his sophomore season. He finished the season with 54 receptions for 877 yards and eight touchdowns. During the season, Gray flipped his commitment to SMU.

Gray became an immediate starter for SMU caught 33 passes for 448 yards and four touchdowns. He was named first-team All-American Athletic Conference as a senior after finishing the season with 49 receptions for 803 yards and nine touchdowns. Following the conclusion of the regular season, Gray announced his decision forgo his final season of NCAA eligibility and enter the 2022 NFL draft.

=== College statistics ===
Season	GP	Receiving				Rushing			
Season	GP	Rec	Yds	Avg	TD	Att	Yds	Avg	TD
2020	8	33	448	13.6	4	3	30	10.0	2
2021	10	49	803	16.4	9	3	40	13.3	0
Career	18	82	1,251	15.3	13	6	70	11.7	2

== Professional career ==
Pre-draft measurables
Height	Weight	Arm length	Hand span	Wingspan	40-yard dash	10-yard split	20-yard split	20-yard shuttle	Three-cone drill	Vertical jump	Broad jump
5 ft 11 7/8 in (1.83 m)	186 lb (84 kg)	31 7/8 in (0.81 m)	9 5/8 in (0.24 m)	6 ft 4 7/8 in (1.95 m)	4.33 s	1.57 s	2.53 s	4.37 s	7.38 s	34.0 in (0.86 m)	10 ft 6 in (3.20 m)
All values from NFL Combine/Pro Day

=== San Francisco 49ers ===
Gray was selected by the San Francisco 49ers in the third round (105th overall) of the 2022 NFL Draft. On December 11, in a 35–7 victory over the Tampa Bay Buccaneers, Gray recorded his first career reception, going for 10 yards on a pass from Josh Johnson. He played in 13 games as a rookie, with his first career catch being his only reception on the year.

On August 30, 2023, Gray was placed on injured reserve.

Gray was waived by the 49ers on August 27, 2024.

=== Philadelphia Eagles ===
On September 10, 2024, Gray was signed to the Philadelphia Eagles' practice squad. He won a Super Bowl championship when the Eagles defeated the Kansas City Chiefs 40–22 in Super Bowl LIX. He signed a reserve/future contract with Philadelphia on February 14, 2025. Gray was waived by the Eagles on July 29.

On November 3, 2025, Gray was re-signed to the Eagles' practice squad. He signed a reserve/future contract with Philadelphia on January 12, 2026.

On August 30, 2026, Gray was released by the Eagles as a part of final roster cuts. On September 1, Philadelphia re–signed Gray to their practice squad. He was released by the Eagles on September 18.
