= Tanner Mordecai =

American football player (born 1999)

No. 4
- Position: Quarterback

Personal information
- Born: November 8, 1999 (age 27); Waco, Texas, U.S.
- Listed height: 6 ft 2 in (1.88 m)
- Listed weight: 218 lb (99 kg)

Career information
- High school: Midway (Waco)
- College: Oklahoma (2018–2020); SMU (2021–2022); Wisconsin (2023)
- NFL draft: 2024: undrafted

Career history
- San Francisco 49ers (2024)*
- * Offseason or practice squad member only

Awards and highlights
- Second-team All-AAC (2021)
- Stats at Pro Football Reference

Tanner Mordecai (born November 8, 1999) is an American professional football quarterback. He played college football for the Oklahoma Sooners, SMU Mustangs and Wisconsin Badgers. He signed with the San Francisco 49ers as an undrafted free agent after the 2024 NFL draft.

== Early life ==
Mordecai attended Midway High School in Waco, Texas. During his career he passed for 4,797 yards and 51 touchdowns. He committed to the University of Oklahoma to play college football.

== College career ==
=== Oklahoma ===
Mordecai played at Oklahoma from 2018 to 2020. In his first year he appeared in two games as a backup to Kyler Murray and took a redshirt. In 2019, he competed with Jalen Hurts to be the starter but lost the job and was the backup to Hurts for the season. In 2020 he again competed for the starting job, this time with Spencer Rattler, but again lost the job and spent the year as his backup. Overall he played in 12 games at Oklahoma, completing 50 of 70 passes for 639 yards and four touchdowns.

=== SMU ===
In 2021, Mordecai transferred to Southern Methodist University. In his first year at SMU, he was named the starter. In his first start, he threw for a then school-record seven passing touchdowns in a 56–9 victory over Abilene Christian. Following the 2021 season, Mordecai was selected to the American's All-Conference Second Team.

On November 5, 2022, against the Houston Cougars, Mordecai threw for a school-record 9 touchdowns, 7 of which came in the first half. The Mustangs won the game 77–63, breaking the FBS record for highest-scoring regulation game. For his performance, Mordecai was named The American's offensive player of the week.

=== Wisconsin ===
On December 30, 2022, Mordecai announced his intent to transfer to the University of Wisconsin.

=== Statistics ===
Year	Team	Games			Passing								Rushing			
Year	Team	GP	GS	Record	Cmp	Att	Pct	Yds	Avg	TD	Int	Rtg	Att	Yds	Avg	TD
2018	Oklahoma	2	0	—	2	4	50.0	37	9.3	0	0	127.7	0	0	0.0	0
2019	Oklahoma	6	0	—	16	26	61.5	207	8.0	2	0	153.8	4	16	4.0	0
2020	Oklahoma	4	0	—	32	40	80.0	395	9.9	2	1	174.5	11	−14	−1.3	0
2021	SMU	12	12	8–4	308	454	67.8	3,628	8.0	39	12	158.0	74	202	2.7	2
2022	SMU	12	12	6–6	288	443	65.0	3,524	8.0	33	10	151.9	59	100	1.7	2
2023	Wisconsin	10	10	6–4	204	314	65.0	2,066	6.6	9	4	127.1	90	302	3.4	4
Career		46	34	20–14	850	1,281	66.4	9,857	7.7	85	27	148.7	238	606	2.5	8

== Professional career ==
Pre-draft measurables
Height	Weight	Arm length	Hand span	40-yard dash	10-yard split	20-yard split	20-yard shuttle	Three-cone drill	Vertical jump	Broad jump
6 ft 1 5/8 in (1.87 m)	210 lb (95 kg)	31 5/8 in (0.80 m)	8 7/8 in (0.23 m)	4.46 s	1.63 s	2.67 s	4.23 s	7.00 s	36.5 in (0.93 m)	9 ft 11 in (3.02 m)
All values from Pro Day

On April 27, 2024, Mordecai signed with the San Francisco 49ers as an undrafted free agent after he was not selected in the 2024 NFL draft. He was also selected by the DC Defenders in the ninth round of the 2024 UFL draft on July 17. Mordecai was waived on August 27, and re-signed to the practice squad. He signed a reserve/future contract with San Francisco on January 6, 2025.

On August 4, 2025, Mordecai was waived by the 49ers. He was re-signed three days later, but was waived again on August 11. Mordecai re-signed with the 49ers on August 21, but was waived/injured by the team on August 25.
