= Blake Mazza =

American football player (born 1998)

No. 92
- Position: Placekicker

Personal information
- Born: December 8, 1998 (age 27); Plano, Texas, U.S.
- Listed height: 5 ft 10 in (1.78 m)
- Listed weight: 186 lb (84 kg)

Career information
- High school: Plano Senior
- College: SMU (2021); Washington State (2018–2020); Arkansas (2017)

Awards and highlights
- PFF Preseason First-team All-ACC (2021); 2× Lou Groza Award Watch List (2020, 2021); First-team All-Pac-12 (2019)
- Stats at ESPN

Blake Mazza (born December 8, 1998) is an American college football placekicker. He previously played for the SMU, Washington State Cougars, and the Arkansas Razorbacks.

== Early life ==
Mazza attended Plano Senior High School in Plano, Texas. Coming out of high school, he was rated as a five-star recruit and the 12th best placekicker for the class of 2017 by Chris Sailer Kicking.

=== Statistics ===
Year	GP	Kicking						
Year	GP	XPM	XPA	XP %	FGM	FGA	FG %	Long
2014	1	6	6	100.0	1	1	100.0	26
2015	10	27	28	96.4	6	7	85.7	44
2016	10	31	35	88.6	4	7	57.1	49
Career	21	64	69	92.7	11	15	73.3	49

== College career ==
=== Arkansas ===
==== 2017 ====
Mazza received a scholarship offer from Army, but committed to the University of Arkansas, appearing as a walk-on for the 2017 team; he did not receive any playing time during the season.

=== SMU ===
==== 2021 ====
On January 20, 2021, Mazza announced he would be transferring from Washington State in order to play closer to home. Six days later, it was announced that Mazza would be transferring to Southern Methodist University (SMU).

=== Statistics ===
Year	Team	GP	Kicking							
Year	Team	GP	XPM	XPA	XP %	FGM	FGA	FG %	Long	Points
2017	Arkansas	Did not play								
2018	Washington State	13	60	62	96.8	10	15	66.7	50	90
2019	Washington State	13	55	57	96.5	20	21	95.2	51	115
2020	Washington State	4	12	13	92.3	4	4	100.0	49	90
2021	SMU	12	54	57	94.7	12	16	75.0	47	68
Career		42	181	190	95.3	46	56	82.1	51	319
