= 2021 Cincinnati Bearcats football team =

American college football season

2021 Cincinnati Bearcats football

AAC champion

AAC Championship Game, W 35–20 vs. Houston

Cotton Bowl Classic (CFP semifinal), L 6–27 vs. Alabama
- Conference: American Athletic Conference

Ranking
- Coaches: No. 4
- AP: No. 4
- Record: 13–1 (8–0 AAC)
- Head coach: Luke Fickell (5th season)
- Offensive coordinator: Mike Denbrock (5th season)
- Offensive scheme: Multiple
- Defensive coordinator: Mike Tressel (1st season)
- Base defense: 3–3–5
- Home stadium: Nippert Stadium

2021 American Athletic Conference football standings
	Conf.			Overall
Team	W		L	W		L
No. 4 Cincinnati y$^	8	–	0	13	–	1
No. 17 Houston y	8	–	0	12	–	2
UCF	5	–	3	9	–	4
East Carolina	5	–	3	7	–	5
Tulsa	5	–	3	7	–	6
SMU	4	–	4	8	–	4
Memphis	3	–	5	6	–	6
Navy	3	–	5	4	–	8
Tulane	1	–	7	2	–	10
South Florida	1	–	7	2	–	10
Temple	1	–	7	3	–	9
Championship: Cincinnati 35, Houston 20
^ – College Football Playoff participant; $ – Conference champion; y – Championship game participant; Rankings from AP Poll

The 2021 Cincinnati Bearcats football team represented the University of Cincinnati in the 2021 NCAA Division I FBS football season. The Bearcats played their home games at Nippert Stadium and competed as members of the American Athletic Conference (AAC). They were led by fifth-year head coach Luke Fickell.

Coming off a 9–1 season and a Peach Bowl appearance in 2020, Cincinnati began the 2021 season ranked eight in the preseason AP Poll. The team secured a signature non-conference win by defeating then-No. 9 Notre Dame on the road, 24–13, in the fourth game of the year. The Bearcats capped an undefeated regular season by defeating Houston in the American Conference championship game. In the final College Football Playoff rankings of the season, in which the Bearcats were the last remaining undefeated team, Cincinnati was ranked No. 4, earning them a spot in the national semi-final game to be played at the Cotton Bowl. This marked the first time a team from one of the Group of Five conferences was selected for a playoff spot. In that game, Cincinnati lost to first-seeded Alabama, 27–6, ending Cincinnati's season with a 13–1 record, and they were ranked fourth in the final polls. These marked the most wins and highest poll finish in Cincinnati program history.

Cincinnati's offense was led by quarterback Desmond Ridder, who led the AAC in passer efficiency rating and was named the conference's Offensive Player of the Year. Ridder threw for 3,334 yards and 30 touchdowns on the season. Running back Jerome Ford led the conference in rushing with 1,319 yards and 19 touchdowns. Three Bearcat offensive lineman were named to the first team All-Conference: Lorenz Metz, Dylan O’Quinn, and Jake Renfro. On defense, the team was led by consensus All-American and AAC Defensive Player of the Year, cornerback Sauce Gardner. Cornerback Coby Bryant was also named to the first-team All-Conference and several All-America teams, and was the recipient of the Jim Thorpe Award. Linebacker Joel Dublanko led the team in tackles, and defensive lineman Curtis Brooks led the conference in sacks. Head coach Luke Fickell was the recipient of several national and the American Conference's Coach of the Year awards. Nine Cincinnati players were selected in the 2022 NFL draft, including fourth-overall pick Sauce Gardner.

== Offseason ==
=== Coaching changes ===
After the 2020 season, Marcus Freeman was announced as the defensive coordinator for Notre Dame. Mike Tressel was hired to replace Freeman as defensive coordinator, returning Tressel to Cincinnati where he had coached from 2004 to 2006.

Darren Paige was named the new running backs coach after the departure of Dan Enos.

=== Players ===
2021 Cincinnati offseason departures
Name	Number	Pos.	Height	Weight	Year	Hometown	Notes
James Wiggins	1	S	6’0	205	(redshirt) Senior	Miami, FL	Graduated
Darrick Forrest	5	S	6’ 0"	200	Senior	Columbus, OH	Graduated
Jarell White	8	LB	5’ 10"	205	Senior	Cincinnati, OH	Graduated
Ethan Tucky	19	DE	6’ 2"	245	(redshirt) Senior	Delaware, OH	Graduated
Gerrid Doaks	23	RB	6’ 0"	230	(redshirt) Senior	Indianapolis, IN	Graduated
Cameron Young	25	RB	5’ 11"	230	Senior	Columbus, OH	Graduated
James Smith	37	P	6’ 5"	235	Senior	Wangaratta, Australia	Graduated
Michael Pitts	43	DE	6’ 4"	248	(redshirt) Senior	Stone Mountain, GA	Graduated
James Hudson	55	OL	6’ 5"	310	(redshirt) Junior	Toledo, OH	Declared for the NFL draft
Darius Harper	58	OL	6’ 7"	308	Senior	Springfield, OH	Graduated
Bruno Labelle	87	TE	6’ 4"	248	(redshirt) Senior	Montreal, Canada	Graduated
Elijah Ponder	93	DT	6’ 3"	275	(redshirt) Senior	Atlanta, GA	Graduated

==== Transfers ====
Outgoing

Name	Pos.	Height	Weight	Year	Hometown	New School
Jayshon Jackson	WR	5' 10"	175	Senior	Chicago, IL	Ball State
Zach Hummell	OL	6' 2"	285	(redshirt) Sophomore	Hilliard, OH	Miami (OH)
Jakari Robinson	C	6' 2"	308	(redshirt) Senior	Talladega, AL	Memphis
Ben Bryant	QB	6' 3"	218	(redshirt) Junior	La Grange, IL	Eastern Michigan
Michael Lindauer	QB	6' 3"	218	(redshirt) Sophomore	Evansville, IN	Southern Illinois
Dorian Holloway	LB	6' 3"	215	(redshirt) Sophomore	Columbus, OH	Youngstown State
Steven Hawthorne	DE	6' 4"	227	(redshirt) Sophomore	Chicago, IL	Central State
Kobe McAllister	OL	6' 6"	293	Sophomore	Ringgold, GA	Chattanooga

Incoming

Name	Pos.	Height	Weight	Year	Hometown	Prev. School
Jowon Briggs	DT	6' 2"	295	Sophomore	Cincinnati, OH	Virginia
Devin Hightower	LB	6' 1"	225	Sophomore	Akron, OH	Michigan State
James Tunstall	OT	6' 6"	329	(redshirt) Junior	Indian Head, MD	Stony Brook

==== Recruits ====
College recruiting (2021)
Name	Hometown	School	Height	Weight	Commit date
Dontay Corleone; DT	Cincinnati, Ohio	Colerain High School	6 ft 2 in (1.88 m)	295 lb (134 kg)	Oct 19, 2019
Dontay Corleone; DT	Recruit ratings: Rivals: 247Sports: ESPN:				
Brady Lichtenberg; QB	Toledo, Ohio	St. John's Jesuit High School	6 ft 2 in (1.88 m)	190 lb (86 kg)	Dec 16, 2019
Brady Lichtenberg; QB	Recruit ratings: Rivals: 247Sports: ESPN:				
Myles Montgomery; RB	Neptune Beach, Florida	Duncan U. Fletcher High School	5 ft 10 in (1.78 m)	195 lb (88 kg)	Mar 6, 2020
Myles Montgomery; RB	Recruit ratings: Rivals: 247Sports: ESPN:				
Luke Collinsworth; OT	Brookville, Indiana	East Central High School	6 ft 6 in (1.98 m)	300 lb (140 kg)	Apr 3, 2020
Luke Collinsworth; OT	Recruit ratings: Rivals: 247Sports: ESPN:				
Jalen Monrrow; DE	Lafayette, Indiana	Jefferson High School	6 ft 4 in (1.93 m)	258 lb (117 kg)	Apr 7, 2020
Jalen Monrrow; DE	Recruit ratings: Rivals: 247Sports: ESPN:				
Iesa Jarmon; CB	Cincinnati, Ohio	La Salle High School	6 ft 1 in (1.85 m)	180 lb (82 kg)	Apr 10, 2020
Iesa Jarmon; CB	Recruit ratings: Rivals: 247Sports: ESPN:				
Leroy Bowers; S	Cincinnati, Ohio	Princeton High School	6 ft 2 in (1.88 m)	200 lb (91 kg)	Apr 12, 2020
Leroy Bowers; S	Recruit ratings: Rivals: 247Sports: ESPN:				
Armorion Smith; S	Ecorse, Michigan	River Rouge High School	6 ft 2 in (1.88 m)	190 lb (86 kg)	Apr 17, 2020
Armorion Smith; S	Recruit ratings: Rivals: 247Sports: ESPN:				
Mao Glynn; OG	Cincinnati, Ohio	Walnut Hills High School	6 ft 4 in (1.93 m)	280 lb (130 kg)	Apr 18, 2020
Mao Glynn; OG	Recruit ratings: Rivals: 247Sports: ESPN:				
Will Pauling; WR	Flossmoor, Illinois	Homewood-Flossmoor High School	5 ft 10 in (1.78 m)	165 lb (75 kg)	Apr 23, 2020
Will Pauling; WR	Recruit ratings: Rivals: 247Sports: ESPN:				
Landon Fickell; OG	Cincinnati, Ohio	Archbishop Moeller High School	6 ft 5 in (1.96 m)	275 lb (125 kg)	Apr 24, 2020
Landon Fickell; OG	Recruit ratings: Rivals: 247Sports: ESPN:				
Jack Dingle; OLB	Louisville, Kentucky	Trinity High School	6 ft 4 in (1.93 m)	205 lb (93 kg)	Apr 25, 2020
Jack Dingle; OLB	Recruit ratings: Rivals: 247Sports: ESPN:				
Mason Fletcher; P	Melbourne, Australia	ProKick Australia	6 ft 7 in (2.01 m)	N/A	May 14, 2020
Mason Fletcher; P	Recruit ratings: 247Sports:				
Malik Rainey; ATH	Bolingbrook, Illinois	Bolingbrook High School	5 ft 11 in (1.80 m)	175 lb (79 kg)	May 15, 2020
Malik Rainey; ATH	Recruit ratings: Rivals: 247Sports: ESPN:				
Caleb Schmitz; ATH	Lititz, Pennsylvania	Warwick High School	6 ft 4 in (1.93 m)	200 lb (91 kg)	May 22, 2020
Caleb Schmitz; ATH	Recruit ratings: Rivals: 247Sports: ESPN:				
Jah-mal Williams; DE	Fort Lauderdale, Florida	Cardinal Gibbons High School	6 ft 4 in (1.93 m)	225 lb (102 kg)	Aug 12, 2020
Jah-mal Williams; DE	Recruit ratings: Rivals: 247Sports: ESPN:				
Bryon Threats; ATH	Dublin, Ohio	Dublin Coffman High School	5 ft 10 in (1.78 m)	190 lb (86 kg)	Aug 14, 2020
Bryon Threats; ATH	Recruit ratings: Rivals: 247Sports: ESPN:				
Chamon Metayer; TE	Miami, Florida	North Miami High School	6 ft 5 in (1.96 m)	220 lb (100 kg)	Sep 26, 2020
Chamon Metayer; TE	Recruit ratings: Rivals: 247Sports: ESPN:				
Christian Lowery; K	Kennesaw, Georgia	Harrison High School	5 ft 11 in (1.80 m)	156 lb (71 kg)	Oct 13, 2020
Christian Lowery; K	Recruit ratings: ESPN:				
Jonah Lytle; CB	Canton, Ohio	McKinley High School	6 ft 1 in (1.85 m)	180 lb (82 kg)	Oct 19, 2020
Jonah Lytle; CB	Recruit ratings: Rivals: 247Sports: ESPN:				
Cameron Junior; OLB	Middletown, Ohio	Middletown High School	6 ft 1 in (1.85 m)	210 lb (95 kg)	Oct 23, 2020
Cameron Junior; OLB	Recruit ratings: Rivals: 247Sports: ESPN:				
Zeiqui Lawton; DE	Charleston, West Virginia	South Charleston High School	6 ft 3 in (1.91 m)	240 lb (110 kg)	Nov 7, 2020
Zeiqui Lawton; DE	Recruit ratings: Rivals: 247Sports: ESPN:				
Isiah Cox; ATH	Alcoa, Tennessee	Alcoa High School	6 ft 2 in (1.88 m)	185 lb (84 kg)	Nov 8, 2020
Isiah Cox; ATH	Recruit ratings: Rivals: 247Sports: ESPN:				
Drew Donley; WR	Frisco, Texas	Lebanon Trail High School	6 ft 2 in (1.88 m)	170 lb (77 kg)	Dec 14, 2020
Drew Donley; WR	Recruit ratings: Rivals: 247Sports: ESPN:				
Robert Jackson; DT	Warminster, Pennsylvania	Archbishop Wood High School	6 ft 5 in (1.96 m)	265 lb (120 kg)	Dec 15, 2020
Robert Jackson; DT	Recruit ratings: Rivals: 247Sports: ESPN:				
Overall recruit ranking: Rivals: 34 247Sports: 44
Note: In many cases, Scout, Rivals, 247Sports, On3, and ESPN may conflict in their listings of height and weight.; In these cases, the average was taken. ESPN grades are on a 100-point scale.; Sources: "2021 Cincinnati Football Commitment List". Rivals.; "2021 Players Commitments – Cincinnati". ESPN.; "2021 Team Ranking". Rivals.com.; "2021 Cincinnati Bearcats football team". 247Sports.

== Preseason ==
=== Award watch lists ===
Listed in the order that they were released

Award	Player	Position	Year
Walter Camp Award	Sauce Gardner	CB	Jr.
Walter Camp Award	Myjai Sanders	DE	Sr.
Lott Impact Trophy	Coby Bryant	CB	GS
Dodd Trophy	Luke Fickell		
Maxwell Award	Desmond Ridder	QB	Sr.
Bednarik Award	Sauce Gardner	CB	Jr.
Bednarik Award	Myjai Sanders	DE	Sr.
Davey O'Brien Award	Desmond Ridder	QB	Sr.
Mackey Award	Josh Whyle	TE	Jr.
Thorpe Award	Coby Bryant	CB	GS
Thorpe Award	Sauce Gardner	CB	Jr.
Nagurski Trophy	Sauce Gardner	CB	Jr.
Nagurski Trophy	Myjai Sanders	DE	Sr.
Walter Camp Award	Desmond Ridder	QB	Sr.
Manning Award	Desmond Ridder	QB	Sr.

=== American Athletic Conference preseason media poll ===
The American Athletic Conference preseason media poll was released at the virtual media day held August 4, 2021. Cincinnati, who finished the 2020 season ranked No. 8 nationally, was tabbed as the preseason favorite in the 2021 preseason media poll.

Media poll
Predicted finish	Team	Votes (1st place)
1	Cincinnati	262 (22)
2	UCF	241 (2)
3	SMU	188
4	Houston	181
5	Memphis	168
6	Tulsa	153
7	Tulane	132
т-8	East Carolina	85
т-8	Navy	85
10	Temple	46
11	South Florida	43

== Schedule ==
The Bearcats' 2021 schedule consists of six home games and six away games. Cincinnati hosted two of its four non-conference games; Miami (OH) from the Mid-American Conference for their annual Victory Bell game and Murray State from the Ohio Valley Conference. They travelled to Indiana of the Big Ten Conference, and to Notre Dame in their first meeting against former Bearcats head coach Brian Kelly, winning both contests.

With the departure of UConn before the 2020 season, the American eliminated divisions for the 2020 and 2021 seasons. The Bearcats 2021 schedule included eight conference games – four home games and four road games. Cincinnati hosted Temple, UCF, Tulsa and SMU. They traveled to Navy, Tulane, South Florida, and East Carolina.

Date	Time	Opponent	Rank	Site	TV	Result	Attendance
September 4	3:30 p.m.	Miami (OH)*	No. 8	Nippert Stadium; Cincinnati, OH (Victory Bell)	ESPN+	W 49–14	37,978
September 11	3:30 p.m.	Murray State*	No. 7	Nippert Stadium; Cincinnati, OH	ESPN+	W 42–7	33,498
September 18	12:00 p.m.	at Indiana*	No. 8	Memorial Stadium; Bloomington, IN	ESPN	W 38–24	52,656
October 2	2:30 p.m.	at No. 9 Notre Dame*	No. 7	Notre Dame Stadium; Notre Dame, IN	NBC	W 24–13	77,622
October 8	7:00 p.m.	Temple	No. 5	Nippert Stadium; Cincinnati, OH	ESPN	W 52–3	37,978
October 16	12:00 p.m.	UCF	No. 3	Nippert Stadium; Cincinnati, OH (rivalry)	ABC	W 56–21	37,978
October 23	12:00 p.m.	at Navy	No. 2	Navy–Marine Corps Memorial Stadium; Annapolis, MD	ESPN2	W 27–20	32,004
October 30	12:00 p.m.	at Tulane	No. 2	Yulman Stadium; New Orleans, LA	ESPN2	W 31–12	17,012
November 6	3:30 p.m.	Tulsa^{†}	No. 6	Nippert Stadium; Cincinnati, OH (College GameDay)	ESPN2	W 28–20	37,978
November 12	6:00 p.m.	at South Florida	No. 5	Raymond James Stadium; Tampa, FL	ESPN2	W 45–28	30,780
November 20	3:30 p.m.	SMU	No. 5	Nippert Stadium; Cincinnati, OH	ESPN	W 48–14	37,978
November 26	3:30 p.m.	at East Carolina	No. 4	Dowdy–Ficklen Stadium; Greenville, NC	ABC	W 35–13	38,014
December 4	4:00 p.m.	No. 21 Houston	No. 4	Nippert Stadium; Cincinnati, OH (AAC Championship Game)	ABC	W 35–20	37,978
December 31	3:30 p.m.	vs. No. 1 Alabama*	No. 4	AT&T Stadium; Arlington, TX (SEC Nation) (Cotton Bowl Classic–CFP Semifinal)	ESPN	L 6–27	76,313
*Non-conference game; ^{†}Homecoming; Rankings from AP Poll (and CFP Rankings, after November 2) – Released prior to game; All times are in Eastern time

Schedule Source:

== Personnel ==
=== Roster and staff ===
2021 Cincinnati Bearcats football team roster
Players
Coaches
Offense

Pos.	#	Name	Class
RB	0	Charles McClelland	Jr
QB	3	Evan Prater	So
RB	4	Ethan Wright	So
WR	5	Jordan Jones	Sr
WR	7	Tre Tucker	Jr
WR	8	Michael Young Jr.	Sr
QB	9	Desmond Ridder (C)	Sr
QB	10	Jack Perry	Jr
TE	11	Leonard Taylor	Sr
WR	12	Alec Pierce (C)	Sr
QB	13	Jacob Hoying	Fr
WR	14	Wyatt Fischer	Jr
WR	15	Nate Meyer	So
QB	16	Brady Lichtenberg	Fr
WR	17	Marquez Bell	Fr
TE	18	Chamon Metayer	Fr
WR	19	Will Pauling	Fr
WR	20	Jadon Thompson	So
WR	21	Tyler Scott	So
RB	22	Ryan Montgomery	Jr
WR	23	Drew Donley	Fr
RB	24	Jerome Ford	Jr
RB	25	Shaun Thomas	Fr
RB	26	Myles Montgomery	Fr
WR	27	Norman Love	Fr
WR	29	Ashton Koller	Fr
RB	30	Michael Kopaygorodsky	Sr
TE	34	Caleb Schmitz	Fr
RB	36	Lewis Shepherd	So
TE	47	Nate Lawler	Jr
OL	50	Dylan O'Quinn	Jr
OL	51	Lorenz Metz	Jr
OL	52	AJ George	Fr
OL	53	Gavin Gerhardt	Fr
OL	54	Nick Grace	Fr
OL	55	Mao Glynn II	Fr
OL	56	Jake Renfro	So
OL	57	Ben Blevins	Fr
OL	60	Joe Huber	Fr
OL	64	Jake Burns	So
OL	65	Cody Lamb	Sr
OL	66	Landon Fickell	Fr
OL	67	Jaxon Smith	Fr
OL	69	Cam Jones	So
OL	70	Joey Groeber	Jr
OL	71	Colin Woodside	Jr
OL	72	James Tunstall	Jr
OL	73	CJ Johnson	Jr
OL	74	Jeremy Cooper	Jr
OL	75	John Williams	Fr
OL	76	Marcelo Mendiola	So
OL	77	Vincent McConnell (C)	Sr
OL	78	Luke Collinsworth	Fr
WR	80	Chris Scott	Fr
TE	81	Josh Whyle	Jr
TE	82	Noah Davis	Sr
WR	83	Blue Smith	Jr
WR	85	Jiair Thomas	So
TE	86	Jack Campbell	So
TE	87	Joey McBee	Fr
TE	88	Payten Singletary	Fr

Defense

Pos.	#	Name	Class
LB	0	Darrian Beavers	Sr
CB	1	Sauce Gardner	Jr
LB	2	Wilson Huber	Sr
S	3	Ja'von Hicks	Sr
CB	4	Justin Harris	Jr
S	5	Ja'Quan Sheppard	Jr
S	6	Bryan Cook (C)	Sr
CB	7	Coby Bryant (C)	Sr
S	8	Isiah Cox	Fr
CB	9	Arquon Bush	Jr
S	10	Bryon Threats	Fr
CB	11	Sammy Anderson	So
CB	12	Todd Bumphis	Fr
CB	12	Iesa Jarmon	Fr
LB	13	Ty Van Fossen	Jr
CB	15	Taj Ward	Jr
LB	16	Cameron Junior	Fr
DL	18	Jowon Briggs	So
LB	19	Brody Ingle	Jr
LB	20	Deshawn Pace	So
DE	21	Myjai Sanders (C)	Sr
CB	22	De'Arre McDonald	Fr
LB	23	Daved Jones Jr	So
LB	24	Jaheim Thomas	Fr
LB	25	Jack Haglage	Fr
CB	26	Malik Rainey	Fr
S	27	Armorion Smith	Fr
S	29	Jacob Dingle	Jr
DL	30	Rob Jackson	Fr
CB	31	Casey Kirk	Sr
S	32	James Camden	Fr
DL	33	Zeiqui Lawton	Fr
DL	34	Justin Wodtly	Fr
LB	35	Ryan Royer	Sr
S	36	Will Adams	Jr
LB	37	Devin Hightower	Fr
LB	40	Leroy Bowers	Fr
LB	41	Joel Dublanko (C)	Sr
DL	42	Malik Vann	Sr
CB	43	Jonah Lytle	Fr
DL	44	Jah-Mal Williams	Fr
DL	45	Barak Faulk	Fr
LB	49	Jack Dingle	Fr
LB	50	Jackson Bruscianelli	So
DL	54	Izaiah Ruffin	So
DL	57	Ryan Mullaney	So
DL	58	Dontay Corleone	Fr
DL	87	Jalen Monrrow	Fr
DL	89	Sterling Miles	Fr
DL	90	Jabari Taylor	Sr
DL	91	Miles Manigualt	Sr
DL	92	Curtis Brooks	Sr
DL	94	Chase Brown	Jr
DL	96	Dominique Perry	Fr
DL	97	Eric Phillips	So
DL	98	Mychal Keys	Jr
DL	99	Marcus Brown	Sr

Special teams }

Pos.	#	Name	Class
K	17	Cole Smith	Sr
P	31	Mason Fletcher	Fr
P	35	Brady Young	Fr
K	39	Bryce Burton	So
LS	85	Triston O'Brien	Fr
K	90	Christian Lowery	Fr
K	91	Alex Bales	So
LS	96	Cayson Pfeiffer	So

Head coach

- Luke Fickell (Ohio State) – 5th year

Coordinators/assistant coaches

- Mike Denbrock (Grand Valley State)
  5th year – (offensive coordinator/tight ends)
- Mike Tressel (Cornell (IA))
  1st year (4th overall) – (defensive coordinator/linebackers)
- Gino Guidugli (Cincinnati)
  5th year – (passing game coordinator/quarterbacks)
- Brian Mason (Denison)
  4th year – (special teams coordinator)
- Mike Brown (Liberty)
  3rd year – (wide receivers)
- Ron Crook (West Liberty State)
  5th year – (offensive line)
- Perry Eliano (Stephen F. Austin)
  2nd year – (cornerbacks)
- Colin Hitschler (Pennsylvania)
  2nd year – (safeties)
- Greg Scruggs (Louisville)
  2nd year – (defensive line)
- Darren Paige (Findlay)
  1st year – (running backs)

Legend

- (C) Team captain
- (S) Suspended
- (I) Ineligible
- Injured
- Redshirt

Roster

=== Depth chart ===
Defense

NK
Arquon Bush
Taj Ward

FS
Bryan Cook
Jacob Dingle

WLB	MLB	SLB
Darrian Beavers	Joel Dublanko	Ty Van Fossen
Jaheim Thomas	Wilson Huber	Deshawn Pace
Daved Jones Jr.		

SS
Ja'von Hicks
Will Adams

CB
Coby Bryant
Todd Bumphis

DE	NT	DE
Myjai Sanders	Curtis Brooks	Malik Vann
Jabari Taylor	Marcus Brown	Jowon Briggs
	Eric Phillips	

CB
Sauce Gardner
Ja'Quan Sheppard

Offense

WR
Michael Young Jr.
Tre Tucker
Will Pauling

WR
Alec Pierce
Jordan Jones
Blue Smith

LT	LG	C	RG	RT
John Williams; OR James Tunstall	Jeremy Cooper	Jake Renfro	Vincent McConnell	Dylan O'Quinn
	Colin Woodside	Gavin Gerhardt	Lorenz Metz	Cam Jones
	Cody Lamb			

TE
Josh Whyle
OR Leonard Taylor

WR
Tyler Scott
Jadon Thompson
Chris Scott

QB
Desmond Ridder
Evan Prater

RB
Jerome Ford
Charles McClelland
OR Ryan Montgomery

== Game summaries ==
=== Miami (OH) ===
Miami (OH) at Cincinnati
(Victory Bell)

Team	1	2	3	4	Total
RedHawks	0	0	0	14	14
• No. 8 Bearcats	21	14	0	14	49

- Date: September 4, 2021
- Location: Nippert Stadium
  Cincinnati, OH
- Game start: 3:30 p.m. EDT
- Elapsed time: 3 hours and 28 minutes
- Game attendance: 37,978
- Game weather: 81 °F (27 °C) • Weather: Cloudy • Wind: SW 7 MPH
- Referee: Tim O'Dey
- TV announcers (ESPN+): Connor Onion (play-by-play) and Bobby Carpenter (analyst)

Scoring summary
1	14:15	CIN	Tyler Scott 81-yard pass from Desmond Ridder (Cole Smith kick) (2 plays, 84 yards, 0:45)	CIN 0–7
1	08:01	CIN	Ryan Montgomery 8-yard pass from Desmond Ridder (Cole Smith kick) (8 plays, 97 yards, 3:36)	CIN 0–14
1	02:45	CIN	Josh Whyle 23-yard pass from Desmond Ridder (Cole Smith kick) (8 plays, 72 yards, 3:52)	CIN 0–21
2	08:03	CIN	Jerome Ford 21-yard rush (Cole Smith kick) (5 plays, 68 yards, 2:46)	CIN 0–28
2	02:53	CIN	Desmond Ridder 25-yard rush (Cole Smith kick) (5 plays, 49 yards, 3:04)	CIN 0–35
4	11:46	CIN	Leonard Taylor 8-yard pass from Desmond Ridder (Cole Smith kick) (10 plays, 86 yards, 3:05)	CIN 0–42
4	03:20	MIA	Kenny Tracy 19-yard rush (Graham Nicholson kick) (13 plays, 75 yards, 8:26)	CIN 7–42
4	02:30	MIA	John Saunders Jr. 32-yard interception return (Graham Nicholson kick) (2 plays, 1 yard, 0:50)	CIN 14–42
4	00:23	CIN	Evan Prater 14-yard rush (Cole Smith kick) (7 plays, 83 yards, 2:07)	CIN 14–49

Statistics	MIA	CIN
First downs	17	27
Total yards	278	542
Rushing yards	169	247
Passing yards	109	295
Time of possession	34:15	25:45

Team	Category	Player	Statistics
MIA	Passing	AJ Mayer	9/28, 109 yards
MIA	Rushing	Keyon Mozee	15 carries, 80 yards
MIA	Receiving	Mac Hippenhammer	3 receptions, 64 yards
CIN	Passing	Desmond Ridder	20/25, 295 yards, 4 TD, 1 INT
CIN	Rushing	Jerome Ford	12 carries, 121 yards, 1 TD
CIN	Receiving	Tyler Scott	1 reception, 81 yards, 1 TD

=== Murray State ===
Murray State at Cincinnati

Team	1	2	3	4	Total
Racers	0	7	0	0	7
• No. 7 Bearcats	0	7	14	21	42

- Date: September 11, 2021
- Location: Nippert Stadium
  Cincinnati, OH
- Game start: 3:35 p.m. EDT
- Elapsed time: 3 hours and 10 minutes
- Game attendance: 33,498
- Game weather: 83 °F (28 °C) • Weather: Sunny • Wind: N/A
- Referee: Tim Rich
- TV announcers (ESPN+): Connor Onion (play-by-play) and Bobby Carpenter (analyst)

Scoring summary
2	13:41	MUR	Preston Rice 1-yard run (Aaron Baum kick) (12 plays, 65 yards, 7:31)	MUR 7–0
2	09:41	CIN	Noah Davis 2-yard pass from Desmond Ridder (Cole Smith kick) (6 plays, 40 yards, 2:16)	7–7
3	10:05	CIN	Jerome Ford 13-yard run (Cole Smith kick) (10 plays, 75 yards, 4:50)	CIN 7–14
3	04:58	CIN	Jerome Ford 8-yard run (Cole Smith kick) (8 plays, 55 yards, 3:08)	CIN 7–21
4	14:13	CIN	Tyler Scott 23-yard pass from Desmond Ritter (Cole Smith kick) (1 plays, 23 yards, 0:06)	CIN 7–28
4	10:50	CIN	Jerome Ford 3-yard run (Cole Smith kick) (4 plays, 63 yards, 2:09)	CIN 7–35
4	01:08	CIN	Payten Singletary 18-yard pass from Evan Prater (Cole Smith kick) (1 plays, 18 yards, 0:07)	CIN 7–42

Statistics	MUR	CIN
First downs	15	17
Total yards	242	391
Rushing yards	93	130
Passing yards	149	261
Time of possession	34:48	25:12

Team	Category	Player	Statistics
MUR	Passing	Preston Rice	17/29, 149 yards, 3 INT
MUR	Rushing	Damonta Witherspoon	16 carries, 52 yards
MUR	Receiving	Deshun Britten	5 receptions, 58 yards
CIN	Passing	Desmond Ridder	14/22, 243 yards, 2 TD
CIN	Rushing	Jerome Ford	18 carries, 113 yards, 3 TD
CIN	Receiving	Tyler Scott	4 receptions, 74 yards, 1 TD

=== At Indiana ===
Cincinnati at Indiana

Team	1	2	3	4	Total
• No. 8 Bearcats	0	10	13	15	38
Hoosiers	7	7	10	0	24

- Date: September 18, 2021
- Location: Memorial Stadium
  Bloomington, IN
- Game start: 12:00 p.m. EDT
- Elapsed time: 4 hours and 6 minutes
- Game attendance: 52,656
- Game weather: 85 °F (29 °C) • Weather: Sunny • Wind: W 5 MPH
- Referee: Michael Cannon
- TV announcers (ESPN): Dave Pasch (play-by-play), Dusty Dvoracek (analyst), and Tom Luginbill (sideline)

Scoring summary
1	6:15	IND	Peyton Hendershot 16-yard pass from Michael Penix Jr. (Charles Campbell kick) (6 plays, 50 yards, 2:22)	IND 0–7
2	05:06	CIN	Stephen Carr 5-yard pass from Michael Penix Jr. (Charles Campbell) (2 plays, 6 yards, 0:42)	IND 0–14
2	01:33	CIN	Jerome Ford 6-yard rush (Cole Smith kick) (9 plays, 75 yards, 3:33)	IND 7–14
2	00:00	CIN	Cole Smith 32-yard field goal (5 plays, 32 yards, 0:23)	IND 10–14
3	05:47	CIN	Jerome Ford 3-yard rush (Cole Smith kick) (10 plays, 79 yards, 4:29)	CIN 17–14
3	03:52	IND	D.J. Matthews 14-yard rush (Charles Campbell kick) (5 plays, 75 yards, 1:55)	IND 17–21
3	03:41	CIN	Tre Tucker 99-yard kickoff return (Cole Smith kick missed) (0 plays, 99 yards, 0:00)	CIN 23–21
3	00:41	IND	Charles Campbell 49-yard field goal (9 plays, 44 yards, 2:58)	IND 23–24
4	12:13	CIN	Alec Pierce 19-yard pass from Desmond Ridder (Cole Smith kick) (9 plays, 75 yards, 03:26)	CIN 30–24
4	02:37	CIN	Desmond Ridder 7-yard rush (Ridder pass to Leonard Taylor) (3 plays, 6 yards, 0:53)	CIN 38–24

Statistics	CIN	IND
First downs	20	20
Total yards	328	376
Rushing yards	118	152
Passing yards	210	224
Time of possession	29:43	29:36

Team	Category	Player	Statistics
CIN	Passing	Desmond Ridder	20/36, 210 yards, 1 TD, 1 INT
CIN	Rushing	Jerome Ford	20 carries, 66 yards, 2 TD
CIN	Receiving	Alec Pierce	5 receptions, 86 yards, 1 TD
IND	Passing	Michael Penix Jr.	17/40, 224 yards, 2 TD, 3 INT
IND	Rushing	Stephen Carr	21 carries, 52 yards
IND	Receiving	D.J. Matthews	5 receptions, 120 yards

=== At No. 9 Notre Dame ===
Cincinnati at Notre Dame

Team	1	2	3	4	Total
• No. 7 Bearcats	0	17	0	7	24
No. 9 Fighting Irish	0	0	7	6	13

- Date: October 2, 2021
- Location: Notre Dame Stadium
  South Bend, IN
- Game start: 2:41 p.m. EDT
- Elapsed time: 3 hours and 29 minutes
- Game attendance: 77,622
- Game weather: 70 °F (21 °C) • Weather: Cloudy • Wind: SW 9 MPH
- Referee: Marcus Woods
- TV announcers (NBC): Mike Tirico (play–by–play), Drew Brees (analyst), and Kathryn Tappen (sideline)

Scoring summary
2	12:09	CIN	Leonard Taylor 1-yard pass from Desmond Ridder (Cole Smith kick) (3 plays, 8 yards, 1:12)	CIN 7–0
2	10:32	CIN	Cole Smith 23-yard FG (5 plays, 12 yards, 1:32)	CIN 10–0
2	00:40	CIN	Tre Tucker 27-yard pass from Desmond Ridder (Cole Smith kick) (5 plays, 80 yards, 1:08)	CIN 17–0
3	01:19	ND	Kyren Williams 3-yard run (Jonathan Doerer kick) (4 plays, 38 yards, 2:01)	CIN 17–7
4	08:20	ND	Braden Lenzy 32-yard pass from Drew Pyne (Jonathan Doerer kick failed) (8 plays, 80 yards, 3:08)	CIN 17–13
4	05:08	CIN	Desmond Ridder 3-yard run (Cole Smith kick) (6 plays, 75 yards, 3:12)	CIN 24–13

Statistics	CIN	ND
First downs	16	19
Total yards	390	341
Rushing yards	93	84
Passing yards	297	257
Time of possession	28:10	31:50

Team	Category	Player	Statistics
CIN	Passing	Desmond Ridder	19/32, 297 yards, 2 TD
CIN	Rushing	Jerome Ford	17 carries, 71 yards
CIN	Receiving	Alec Pierce	6 receptions, 144 yards
ND	Passing	Drew Pyne	9/22, 143 yards, 1 TD
ND	Rushing	Kyren Williams	13 carries, 48 yards, 1 TD
ND	Receiving	Michael Mayer	8 receptions, 93 yards

=== Temple ===
Temple at Cincinnati

Team	1	2	3	4	Total
Owls	0	3	0	0	3
• No. 5 Bearcats	10	7	28	7	52

- Date: October 8, 2021
- Location: Nippert Stadium
  Cincinnati, OH
- Game start: 7:05 p.m. EDT
- Elapsed time: 3 hours and 18 minutes
- Game attendance: 37,978
- Game weather: 75 °F (24 °C) • Weather: Sunny • Wind: SE 2 MPH
- Referee: Edwin Lee
- TV announcers (ESPN): Clay Matvick (play-by-play), Rocky Boiman (analyst), and Tiffany Blackmon (sideline)

Scoring summary
1	07:15	CIN	Cole Smith 30-yard FG (10 plays, 48 yards, 4:26)	CIN 0–3
1	02:52	CIN	Alec Pierce 9-yard pass from Desmond Ridder (Cole Smith kick) (2 plays, 13 yards, 0:34)	CIN 0–10
2	09:42	CIN	Jerome Ford 8-yard run (Cole Smith kick) (11 plays, 65 yards, 5:10)	CIN 0–17
2	05:27	TEM	Rory Bell 55-yard FG (9 plays, 37 yards, 4:03)	CIN 3–17
3	14:50	CIN	Jerome Ford 75-yard run (Cole Smith kick) (1 play, 75 yards, 0:10)	CIN 3–24
3	11:00	CIN	Tyler Scott 38-yard pass from Desmond Ridder (Cole Smith kick) (2 plays, 54 yards, 0:41)	CIN 3–31
3	07:45	CIN	Charles McClelland 28-yard run (Cole Smith kick) (3 plays, 61 yards, 1:04)	CIN 3–38
3	00:54	CIN	Michael Young 11-yard pass from Desmond Ridder (Cole Smith kick) (10 plays, 76 yards, 4:03)	CIN 3–45
4	10:15	CIN	Ethan Wright 58-yard run (Cole Smith kick) (5 plays, 77 yards, 2:14)	CIN 3–52

Statistics	TEM	CIN
First downs	14	23
Total yards	235	542
Rushing yards	85	279
Passing yards	150	263
Time of possession	31:59	28:01

Team	Category	Player	Statistics
TEM	Passing	D'Wan Mathis	16/27, 120 yards, 1 INT
TEM	Rushing	Justin Lynch	3 carries, 29 yards
TEM	Receiving	Jose Barbon	5 receptions, 45 yards
CIN	Passing	Desmond Ridder	22/30, 259 yards, 3 TD
CIN	Rushing	Jerome Ford	15 carries, 149 yards, 2 TD
CIN	Receiving	Alec Pierce	6 receptions, 93 yards, 1 TD

=== UCF ===
UCF at Cincinnati

Team	1	2	3	4	Total
Knights	0	7	7	7	21
• No. 3 Bearcats	14	21	7	14	56

- Date: October 16, 2021
- Location: Nippert Stadium
  Cincinnati, OH
- Game start: 12:06 p.m. EDT
- Elapsed time: 3 hours and 28 minutes
- Game attendance: 37,978
- Game weather: 63 °F (17 °C) • Weather: Sunny • Wind: SE 4 MPH
- Referee: Henry Johns
- TV announcers (ABC): Bob Wischusen (play-by-play), Dan Orlovsky (analyst), and Kris Budden (reporter)

Scoring summary
1	09:30	CIN	Jerome Ford 1-yard run (Cole Smith kick) (8 plays, 38 yards, 4:01)	CIN 0–7
1	01:30	CIN	Jerome Ford 2-yard run (Cole Smith kick) (10 plays, 66 yards, 4:51)	CIN 0–14
2	07:40	CIN	Alec Pierce 19-yard pass from Desmond Ridder (Cole Smith kick) (4 plays, 64 yards, 1:23)	CIN 0–21
2	05:33	CIN	Jerome Ford 79-yard run (Cole Smith kick) (1 plays, 79 yards, 0:12)	CIN 0–28
2	02:53	CIN	Jerome Ford 4-yard run (Cole Smith kick) (4 plays, 34 yards, 1:31)	CIN 0–35
2	00:33	UCF	Brandon Johnson 16-yard pass from Mikey Keene (Daniel Obarski kick) (8 plays, 75 yards, 2:20)	CIN 7–35
3	02:55	CIN	Coby Bryant 74-yard interception (Cole Smith kick)	CIN 7–42
3	00:41	UCF	Isaiah Bowser 4-yard run (Daniel Obarski kick) (5 plays, 75 yards, 2:14)	CIN 14–42
4	10:44	CIN	Ethan Wright 2-yard run (Cole Smith kick) (2 plays, 8 yards, 0:19)	CIN 14–49
4	05:43	CIN	Evan Prater 6-yard run (Cole Smith kick) (6 plays, 49 yards, 2:30)	CIN 14–56
4	01:48	UCF	Mark-Anthony Richards 2-yard run (Daniel Obarski kick) (7 plays, 70 yards, 3:55)	CIN 21–56

Statistics	UCF	CIN
First downs	14	23
Total yards	296	476
Rushing yards	155	336
Passing yards	141	140
Time of possession	32:48	27:12

Team	Category	Player	Statistics
UCF	Passing	Mikey Keene	16/27, 141 yards, 1 TD, 2 INT
UCF	Rushing	Ryan O'Keefe	1 carries, 51 yards
UCF	Receiving	Ryan O'Keefe	7 receptions, 60 yards
CIN	Passing	Desmond Ridder	13/23, 140 yards, 1 TD
CIN	Rushing	Jerome Ford	20 carries, 190 yards, 4 TD
CIN	Receiving	Leonard Taylor	4 receptions, 47 yards

=== At Navy ===
Cincinnati at Navy

Team	1	2	3	4	Total
• No. 2 Bearcats	7	6	14	0	27
Midshipmen	7	3	0	10	20

- Date: October 23, 2021
- Location: Navy-Marine Corps Memorial Stadium
  Annapolis, MD
- Game start: 12:00 p.m. EDT
- Elapsed time: 3 hours and 25 minutes
- Game attendance: 32,004
- Game weather: 65 °F (18 °C) • Weather: Partly Cloudy • Wind: WSW 5–10 MPH
- Referee: Tim Rich
- TV announcers (ESPN2): Dave Flemming (play-by-play), Rod Gilmore (analyst), and Stormy Buonantony (sideline)

Scoring summary
1	3:51	NAVY	Tai Lavatai 2-yard run (Bijan Nichols kick) (13 plays, 79 yards, 7:12)	NAVY 0–7
1	2:50	CIN	Josh Whyle 31-yard pass from Desmond Ridder (Christian Lowery kick) (3 plays, 44 yards, 1:01)	TIE 7–7
2	14:15	NAVY	Bijan Nichols 33-yard field goal (7 plays, 35 yards, 3:35)	NAVY 7–10
2	4:07	CIN	Christian Lowery 32-yard field goal (15 plays, 61 yards, 6:06)	TIE 10–10
2	0:00	CIN	Alex Bales 52-yard field goal (1 play, 0 yards, 0:01)	CIN 13–10
3	7:39	CIN	Jerome Ford 43-yard run (Christian Lowery kick) (4 plays, 54 yards, 1:27)	CIN 20–10
3	1:13	CIN	Josh Whyle 3-yard pass from Desmond Ridder (Christian Lowery kick) (11 plays, 45 yards, 4:22)	CIN 27–10
4	8:19	NAVY	Bijan Nichols 27-yard field goal (9 plays, 48 yards, 4:27)	CIN 27–13
4	0:50	NAVY	Tai Lavatai 1-yard run (Bijan Nichols kick) (16 plays, 90 yards, 4:39)	CIN 27–20

Statistics	CIN	NAVY
First downs	14	22
Total yards	271	308
Rushing yards	95	192
Passing yards	176	116
Time of possession	20:33	39:27

Team	Category	Player	Statistics
CIN	Passing	Desmond Ridder	18/30, 176 yards, 2 TD, 1 INT
CIN	Rushing	Jerome Ford	15 carries, 90 yards, 1 TD
CIN	Receiving	Josh Whyle	4 receptions, 60 yards, 2 TD
NAVY	Passing	Tai Lavatai	11/16, 116 yards, 1 INT
NAVY	Rushing	Isaac Ruoss	19 carries, 80 yards
NAVY	Receiving	Kai Puailoa-Rojas	2 receptions, 47 yards

=== At Tulane ===
Cincinnati at Tulane

Team	1	2	3	4	Total
• No. 2 Bearcats	7	7	7	10	31
Green Wave	0	12	0	0	12

- Date: October 30, 2021
- Location: Yulman Stadium
  New Orleans, LA
- Game start: 11:00 a.m. CDT
- Elapsed time: 3 hours and 11 minutes
- Game attendance: 17,012
- Game weather: 62 °F (17 °C) • Weather: Partly Cloudy • Wind: NW 7 MPH
- Referee: Luke Richmond
- TV announcers (ESPN2): Anish Shroff (play-by-play), Mike Golic Jr. (analyst), and Taylor McGregor (sideline)

Scoring summary
1	1:14	CIN	Josh Whyle 16-yard pass from Desmond Ridder (Christian Lowery kick) (16 plays, 99 yards, 7:25)	CIN 7–0
2	10:43	TULN	Marvin Moody 8-yard safety (0 plays, 0 yards, 0:00)	CIN 7–2
2	7:58	TULN	Tyjae Spears 47-yard run (Merek Glover kick) (6 plays, 66 yards, 2:34)	TULN 7–9
2	6:19	CIN	Jerome Ford 3-yard run (Christian Lowery kick) (5 plays, 80 yards, 1:33)	CIN 14–9
2	0:00	TULN	Merek Glover 41-yard field goal (4 plays, 26 yards, 0:30)	CIN 14–12
3	3:12	CIN	Josh Whyle 5-yard pass from Desmond Ridder (Christian Lowery kick) (13 plays, 66 yards, 5:55)	CIN 21–12
4	6:16	CIN	Christian Lowery 27-yard field goal (4 plays, 1 yard, 1:09)	CIN 24–12
4	4:13	CIN	Jerome Ford 26-yard pass from Desmond Ridder (Christian Lowery kick) (2 plays, 29 yards, 0:49)	CIN 31–12

Statistics	CIN	TULN
First downs	18	17
Total yards	351	280
Rushing yards	124	187
Passing yards	227	93
Time of possession	28:12	31:48

Team	Category	Player	Statistics
CIN	Passing	Desmond Ridder	17/27, 227 yards, 3 TD, 1 INT
CIN	Rushing	Jerome Ford	18 carries, 65 yards, 1 TD
CIN	Receiving	Josh Whyle	4 receptions, 79 yards, 2 TD
TULN	Passing	Kai Horton	7/16, 79 yards, 2 INT
TULN	Rushing	Tyjae Spears	19 carries, 106 yards, 1 TD
TULN	Receiving	Jha'Quan Jackson	3 receptions, 34 yards

=== Tulsa ===
Tulsa at Cincinnati
(College GameDay)

Team	1	2	3	4	Total
Golden Hurricane	0	12	0	8	20
• No. 6 Bearcats	14	0	14	0	28

- Date: November 6, 2021
- Location: Nippert Stadium
  Cincinnati, OH
- Game start: 3:30 p.m. EDT
- Elapsed time: 3 hours and 39 minutes
- Game attendance: 37,978
- Game weather: 52 °F (11 °C) • Weather: Sunny • Wind: SW 2 MPH
- Referee: Charles Lamertina
- TV announcers (ESPN2): Anish Shroff (play-by-play), Mike Golic Jr. (analyst), and Taylor McGregor (sideline)

Scoring summary
1	9:48	CIN	Desmond Ridder 3-yard run (Christian Lowery kick) (7 plays, 53 yards, 3:15)	CIN 0–7
1	1:21	CIN	Jerome Ford 1-yard run (Christian Lowery kick) (13 plays, 94 yards, 5:55)	CIN 0–14
2	12:20	TLSA	Zack Long 35-yard field goal (9 plays, 48 yards, 4:01)	CIN 3–14
2	2:44	TLSA	Shamari Brooks 8-yard run (Zack Long missed PAT) (12 plays, 75 yards, 4:34)	CIN 9–14
2	0:10	TLSA	Zack Long 50-yard field goal (9 plays, 26 yards, 1:41)	CIN 12–14
3	13:17	CIN	Alec Pierce 12-yard pass from Desmond Ridder (Christian Lowery kick) (4 plays, 72 yards, 1:43)	CIN 12–21
3	9:04	CIN	Michael Young Jr. 31-yard pass from Desmond Ridder (Christian Lowery kick) (3 plays, 44 yards, 1:04)	CIN 12–28
4	8:10	TLSA	JuanCarlos Santana 21-yard pass from Davis Brin (Davis Brin pass to Sam Crawford Jr. for two-point conversion) (10 plays, 82 yard, 4:11)	CIN 20–28

Statistics	TLSA	CIN
First downs	26	18
Total yards	446	390
Rushing yards	297	116
Passing yards	149	274
Time of possession	34:16	25:44

Team	Category	Player	Statistics
TLSA	Passing	Davis Brin	17/26, 149 yards, 1 TD
TLSA	Rushing	Shamari Brooks	25 carries, 132 yards, 1 TD
TLSA	Receiving	Josh Johnson	7 receptions, 65 yards
CIN	Passing	Desmond Ridder	15/23, 274 yards, 2 TD, 1 INT
CIN	Rushing	Desmond Ridder	12 carries, 43 yards, 1 TD
CIN	Receiving	Alec Pierce	5 receptions, 113 yards, 1 TD

=== At South Florida ===
Cincinnati at South Florida

Team	1	2	3	4	Total
• No. 5 Bearcats	7	17	7	14	45
Bulls	7	0	14	7	28

- Date: November 12, 2021
- Location: Raymond James Stadium
  Tampa, FL
- Game start: 6:00 p.m. EST
- Elapsed time: 3 hours and 31 minutes
- Game attendance: 30,780
- Game weather: 75 °F (24 °C) • Weather: Sunny • Wind: E 5 MPH
- Referee: Nate Black
- TV announcers (ESPN2): Jason Benetti (play-by-play), Andre Ware (analyst), and Paul Carcaterra (sideline)

Scoring summary
1	7:08	USF	Jaren Mangham 2-yard run (Spencer Shrader kick) (1 play, 2 yards, 0:05)	USF 0–7
1	2:57	CIN	Ryan Montgomery 12-yard run (Alex Bales kick) (9 plays, 75 yards, 4:11)	TIE 7–7
2	9:36	CIN	Desmond Ridder 13-yard run (Alex Bales kick) (11 plays, 73 yards, 5:31)	CIN 14–7
2	5:30	CIN	Tre Tucker 1-yard pass from Desmond Ridder (Alex Bales kick) (6 plays, 34 yards, 2:51)	CIN 21–7
2	0:00	CIN	Alex Bales 27-yard field goal (10 plays, 46 yards, 2:11)	CIN 24–7
3	11:48	CIN	Josh Whyle 21-yard pass from Desmond Ridder (Alex Bales kick) (8 plays, 66 yards, 3:12)	CIN 31–7
3	6:39	USF	Jaren Mangham 1-yard run (Spencer Shrader kick) (12 plays, 75 yards, 5:09)	CIN 31–14
3	3:48	USF	Jimmy Horn Jr. 80-yard pass from Timmy McClain (Spencer Shrader kick) (1 play, 80 yards, 0:13)	CIN 31–21
4	14:00	CIN	Ethan Wright 1-yard run (Alex Bales kick) (10 plays, 73 yards, 4:48)	CIN 38–21
4	6:14	USF	Timmy McClain 2-yard run (Spencer Shrader kick) (16 plays, 98 yards, 5:13)	CIN 38–28
4	1:22	CIN	Ryan Montgomery 55-yard run (Alex Bales kick) (1 play, 55 yards, 0:11)	CIN 45–28

Statistics	CIN	USF
First downs	30	21
Total yards	506	346
Rushing yards	202	101
Passing yards	304	245
Time of possession	32:30	27:30

Team	Category	Player	Statistics
CIN	Passing	Desmond Ridder	31/39, 304 yards, 2 TD, 1 INT
CIN	Rushing	Ryan Montgomery	6 carries, 72 yards, 2 TD
CIN	Receiving	Josh Whyle	5 receptions, 61 yards, 1 TD
USF	Passing	Timmy McClain	16/30, 245 yards, 1 TD, 2 INT
USF	Rushing	Jaren Mangham	16 carries, 53 yards, 2 TD
USF	Receiving	Jimmy Horn Jr.	5 receptions, 108 yards, 1 TD

=== SMU ===
SMU at Cincinnati

Team	1	2	3	4	Total
Mustangs	0	0	0	14	14
• No. 5 Bearcats	14	13	14	7	48

- Date: November 20
- Location: Nippert Stadium
  Cincinnati, OH
- Game start: 3:40 p.m. EST
- Elapsed time: 3 hours and 19 minutes
- Game attendance: 37,978
- Game weather: Temperature: 49 °F (9 °C) • Weather: Cloudy • Wind: SW 8 MPH
- Referee: Charles Lamertina
- TV announcers (ESPN): Bob Wischusen (play-by-play), Dan Orlovsky (analyst), and Kris Budden (sideline)

Scoring summary
1	12:54	CIN	Tyler Scott 53-yard pass from Desmond Ridder (Alex Bales kick) (1 play, 53 yards, 0:07)	CIN 7–0
1	5:32	CIN	Jerome Ford 4-yard run (Alex Bales kick) (6 plays, 25 yards, 2:58)	CIN 14–0
2	13:37	CIN	Desmond Ridder 40-yard run (Alex Bales missed PAT) (6 plays, 78 yards, 3:02)	CIN 20–0
2	8:19	CIN	Alec Pierce 17-yard pass from Desmond Ridder (Alex Bales kick) (8 plays, 71 yards, 3:40)	CIN 27–0
3	10:59	CIN	Desmond Ridder 5-yard pass from Jordan Jones (Alex Bales kick) (7 plays, 92 yards, 4:01)	CIN 34–0
3	5:44	CIN	Alec Pierce 17-yard pass from Desmond Ridder (Alex Bales kick) (8 plays, 42 yards, 3:59)	CIN 41–0
4	11:06	CIN	Jordan Jones 11-yard pass from Evan Prater (Alex Bales kick) (12 plays, 74 yards, 6:22)	CIN 48–0
4	8:32	SMU	Tre Siggers 2-yard run (Blake Mazza kick) (6 plays, 63 yards, 2:34)	CIN 48–7
4	1:17	SMU	Rashee Rice 3-yard pass from Tanner Mordecai (Blake Mazza kick) (9 plays, 46 yards, 3:43)	CIN 48–14

Statistics	SMU	CIN
First downs	15	24
Total yards	199	544
Rushing yards	133	249
Passing yards	66	295
Time of possession	24:39	35:21

Team	Category	Player	Statistics
SMU	Passing	Tanner Mordecai	15/26, 66 yards, 1 TD
SMU	Rushing	Ulysses Bentley IV	11 carries, 68 yards
SMU	Receiving	Rashee Rice	7 receptions, 21 yards, 1 TD
CIN	Passing	Desmond Ridder	17/23, 274 yards, 3 TD
CIN	Rushing	Jerome Ford	19 carries, 82 yards, 1 TD
CIN	Receiving	Tre Tucker	7 receptions, 114 yards

=== At East Carolina ===
Cincinnati at East Carolina

Team	1	2	3	4	Total
• No. 4 Bearcats	0	21	0	14	35
Pirates	3	0	3	7	13

- Date: November 26, 2021
- Location: Dowdy–Ficklen Stadium
  Greenville, NC
- Game start: 3:50 p.m. EST
- Elapsed time: 3 hours and 23 minutes
- Game attendance: 38,014
- Game weather: 55 °F (13 °C) • Weather: Sunny • Wind: NW 20 MPH
- Referee: Hank Johns
- TV announcers (ABC): Jason Benetti (play-by-play), Andre Ware (analyst), and Paul Carcaterra (sideline)

Scoring summary
1	5:29	ECU	Owen Daffer 35-yard field goal (12 plays, 56 yards, 4:37)	ECU 0–3
2	13:48	CIN	Leonard Taylor 44-yard pass from Desmond Ridder (Christian Lowery kick) (5 plays, 76 yards, 1:31)	CIN 7–3
2	10:32	CIN	Jerome Ford 2-yard run (Christian Lowery kick) (3 plays, 58 yards, 1:09)	CIN 14–3
2	4:40	CIN	Alec Pierce 28-yard pass from Desmond Ridder (Christian Lowery kick) (7 plays, 88 yards, 3:19)	CIN 21–3
3	2:18	ECU	Owen Daffer 44-yard field goal (11 plays, 51 yards, 5:58)	CIN 21–6
4	11:17	CIN	Sauce Gardner 60-yard return of blocked field goal (Christian Lowery kick) (9 plays, 30 yards, 4:04)	CIN 28–6
4	9:38	ECU	Jai Hatfield 12-yard pass from Holton Ahlers (Owen Daffer kick) (5 plays, 75 yards, 1:39)	CIN 28–13
4	1:44	CIN	Ryan Montgomery 2-yard run (Christian Lowery kick) (5 plays, 39 yards, 1:35)	CIN 35–13

Statistics	CIN	ECU
First downs	20	19
Total yards	444	282
Rushing yards	143	54
Passing yards	301	228
Time of possession	27:42	32:18

Team	Category	Player	Statistics
CIN	Passing	Desmond Ridder	17/28, 301 yards, 2 TD, 2 INT
CIN	Rushing	Jerome Ford	20 carries, 85 yards, 1 TD
CIN	Receiving	Alec Pierce	8 receptions, 136 yards, 1 TD
ECU	Passing	Holton Ahlers	19/38, 228 yards, 1 TD, 1 INT
ECU	Rushing	Keaton Mitchell	17 carries, 55 yards
ECU	Receiving	Tyler Snead	6 receptions, 91 yards

=== No. 21 Houston (AAC Championship game) ===
2021 American Athletic Conference Football Championship Game

Team	1	2	3	4	Total
No. 21 Cougars	10	3	0	7	20
• No. 4 Bearcats	14	0	21	0	35

- Date: December 4, 2021
- Location: Nippert Stadium
  Cincinnati, OH
- Game start: 4:08 p.m. EST
- Elapsed time: 3 hours and 21 minutes
- Game attendance: 37,978
- Game weather: 52 °F (11 °C) • Weather: Sunny • Wind: N 6 MPH
- Referee: Hank Johns
- TV announcers (ABC): Joe Tessitore (play-by-play), Greg McElroy (analyst), and Katie George (sideline)

Scoring summary
1	11:55	HOU	Dalton Witherspoon 37-yard field goal (7 plays, 50 yards, 2:57)	HOU 3–0
1	9:38	CIN	Tyler Scott 25-yard pass from Desmond Ridder (Christian Lowery kick) (5 plays, 82 yards, 2:11)	CIN 7–3
1	4:23	HOU	Tank Dell 16-yard pass from Clayton Tune (Dalton Witherspoon kick) (10 plays, 74 yards, 5:07)	HOU 10–7
1	4:06	CIN	Jerome Ford 79-yard run (Christian Lowery kick) (1 play, 79 yards, 0:11)	CIN 14–10
2	11:40	HOU	Dalton Witherspoon 46-yard field goal (13 plays, 44 yards, 7:21)	CIN 14–13
3	12:02	CIN	Leonard Taylor 8-yard pass from Desmond Ridder (6 plays, 75 yards, 2:58)	CIN 21–13
3	11:04	CIN	Alec Pierce 21-yard pass from Desmond Ridder (Christian Lowery kick) (2 plays, 23 yards, 0:41)	CIN 28–13
3	7:38	CIN	Jerome Ford 42-yard run (Christian Lowery kick) (3 plays, 62 yards, 1:18)	CIN 35–13
4	6:06	HOU	Jake Herslow 7-yard pass from Clayton Tune (Dalton Witherspoon kick) (13 plays, 90 yards, 7:28)	CIN 35–20

Statistics	HOU	CIN
First downs	22	14
Total yards	336	400
Rushing yards	86	210
Passing yards	250	190
Time of possession	40:19	19:41

Team	Category	Player	Statistics
HOU	Passing	Clayton Tune	17/26, 250 yards, 2 TD, 1 INT
HOU	Rushing	Alton McCaskill	13 carries, 39 yards
HOU	Receiving	Tank Dell	9 receptions, 152 yards, 1 TD
CIN	Passing	Desmond Ridder	11/17, 190 yards, 3 TD
CIN	Rushing	Jerome Ford	18 carries, 187 yards, 2 TD
CIN	Receiving	Alec Pierce	2 receptions, 65 yards, 1 TD

=== Vs. No. 1 Alabama ===
Cotton Bowl – CFP Semifinal

Team	1	2	3	4	Total
No. 4 Bearcats	3	0	3	0	6
• No. 1 Crimson Tide	7	10	0	10	27

- Date: December 31, 2021
- Location: AT&T Stadium
  Arlington, TX
- Game start: 2:40 p.m. CST
- Elapsed time: 3:18
- Game attendance: 76,313
- Game weather: Indoors
- Referee: Steve Strimling
- TV announcers (ESPN/ESPN Radio): Sean McDonough (play-by-play), Todd Blackledge (analyst), Molly McGrath, and Laura Rutledge (sidelines)/Shawn Kelley (play-by-play), Barrett Jones (analyst), and Ian Fitzsimmons (sideline)

Scoring summary
1
2
3
4

Statistics	CIN	ALA
First downs	13	27
Total yards	218	482
Rushing yards	74	301
Passing yards	144	181
Time of possession	26:19	33:41

Team	Category	Player	Statistics
CIN	Passing	Desmond Ridder	17/32 144 yards
CIN	Rushing	Jerome Ford	15 rushes, 77 yards
CIN	Receiving	Michael Young Jr.	4 receptions, 55 yards
ALA	Passing	Bryce Young	17/28, 181 yards, 3 TD, INT
ALA	Rushing	Brian Robinson Jr.	26 rushes, 204 yards
ALA	Receiving	Ja'Corey Brooks	4 receptions, 66 yards, TD

== Rankings ==
Ranking movements Legend: ██ Increase in ranking ██ Decrease in ranking ( ) = First-place votes
	Week															
Poll	Pre	1	2	3	4	5	6	7	8	9	10	11	12	13	14	Final
AP	8	7	8	8	7	5	3	2	2	2	2	3	4	3	4 (3)	4
Coaches	10	8	8	9	8	6	4	3	2	2	3	3	4	4	4 (3)	4
CFP	Not released									6	5	5	4	4	4	Not released

== After the season ==
=== Awards and AAC honors ===
Weekly Awards
Player	Award	Date Awarded	Ref.
Deshawn Pace	Defensive Player of the Week	September 20, 2021	
Desmond Ridder	Offensive Player of the Week	October 4, 2021	
Jerome Ford	Offensive Player of the Week	October 11, 2021	
Jerome Ford (2)	Offensive Player of the Week	October 18, 2021	
Desmond Ridder (2)	Offensive Player of the Week	November 22, 2021	
Sauce Gardner	Defensive Player of the Week	November 29, 2021	

American Athletic Conference Individual Awards
Player	Award	Ref.
Desmond Ridder	AAC Offensive Player of the Year	
Sauce Gardner*	AAC Defensive Player of the Year	
Luke Fickell	AAC Coach of the Year	

Individual Yearly Awards
Player	Award	Ref.
Luke Fickell	Home Depot Coach of the Year Award	
Luke Fickell	AFCA Regional Coach of the Year	
Luke Fickell	Eddie Robinson Coach of the Year	
Luke Fickell	Bobby Dodd Coach of the Year	
Luke Fickell	AFCA Coach of the Year	
Luke Fickell	Bear Bryant Award	
Coby Bryant	Jim Thorpe Award	

All-AAC
Player	Position	Team
Dylan O’Quinn	OT	1
Lorenz Metz	OG	1
Jake Renfro	C	1
Desmond Ridder	QB	1
Jerome Ford	RB	1
Curtis Brooks	DL	1
Myjai Sanders*	DL	1
Darrian Beavers	LB	1
Joel Dublanko	LB	1
Sauce Gardner*	CB	1
Coby Bryant	CB	1
Bryan Cook	S	1
Alec Pierce	WR	2
Marcus Brown	DL	Hon.
Deshawn Pace	LB	Hon.
Josh Whyle	TE	Hon.
Reference: * Denotes Unanimous Selection

=== All-Americans ===
NCAA Recognized All-American Honors
Player	AFCA	AP	FWAA	TSN	WCFF	Designation
Coby Bryant	1st	2nd		2nd	1st	
Sauce Gardner	1st	1st	1st	1st	2nd	Consensus
The NCAA recognizes a selection to all five of the AP, AFCA, FWAA, TSN and WCFF first teams for unanimous selections and three of five for consensus selections.

Other All-American Honors
Player	Athletic	Athlon	BR	CBS Sports	CFN	ESPN	FOX Sports	Phil Steele	SI	USA Today
Coby Bryant				2nd						2nd
Sauce Gardner	1st			1st		1st				1st

=== NFL draft ===
The NFL draft was held in Las Vegas, Nevada on April 28–30, 2022. The nine picks are a school record and were the third most of any school in this year's draft.

Bearcats picked in the 2022 NFL Draft:

Round	Pick	Player	Position	NFL team
1	4	Sauce Gardner	CB	New York Jets
2	53	Alec Pierce	WR	Indianapolis Colts
2	62	Bryan Cook	S	Kansas City Chiefs
3	74	Desmond Ridder	QB	Atlanta Falcons
3	100	Myjai Sanders	DE	Arizona Cardinals
4	109	Coby Bryant	CB	Seattle Seahawks
5	156	Jerome Ford	RB	Cleveland Browns
6	182	Darrian Beavers	LB	New York Giants
6	216	Curtis Brooks	DT	Indianapolis Colts
