= Sam Daniel =

American basketball player (born 1996)

Free agent
- Position: Small forward

Personal information
- Born: January 6, 1996 (age 30) Kingsland, Georgia, U.S.
- Listed height: 6 ft 8 in (2.03 m)
- Listed weight: 220 lb (100 kg)

Career information
- High school: Camden County (Kingsland, Georgia)
- College: Florida Tech (2014–2018)
- NBA draft: 2018: undrafted
- Playing career: 2018–present

Career history
- 2018–2019: Minas Storm
- 2019: T71 Dudelange
- 2019–2020: Plymouth Raiders
- 2020–2021: UBSC Graz
- 2021: Mykolaiv
- 2022: Comunicaciones
- 2022: Caballeros de Culiacán
- 2023–2024: Sudbury Five
- 2024: Wisconsin Herd
- 2024: Oklahoma City Blue
- 2024–2025: Mayrouba Club
- 2025–2026: Tadamon Zouk

Career highlights
- NBA G League champion (2024); First-team All-Sunshine State (2017); Second-team All-Sunshine State (2018)

Samuel James Daniel (born January 6, 1996) is an American professional basketball player who last played for the Tadamon Zouk of the Lebanese Basketball League. He played college basketball for the Florida Tech Panthers.

== High school career ==
Daniel attended Camden County at Kingsland, Georgia, where he averaged 30 points and 13 rebounds as a senior, earning a first team all-region selection, a Georgia Athletic Coaches Association All-Star, offensive player of the year and Georgia Sportswriters All-State Second Team.

== College career ==
Daniel played college basketball at Florida Tech where he finished his career as one of the school's best scorers with 1,647 points and was the program's all-time leader in made three-pointers with 247. As a senior, he ended up second in the Sunshine State Conference with a 21.9 points per game while adding 6.4 rebounds and at the same time, he led the league and set a new school record with 97 made three-pointers.

== Professional career ==
=== Minas Storm (2018–2019) ===
After going undrafted in the 2018 NBA draft, Daniel signed with Minas Storm of the Novo Basquete Brasil on August 1, 2018.

=== T71 Dudelange (2019) ===
In October 2019, Daniel signed with T71 Dudelange of the Luxembourg Basketball League, where he played one game in which he scored 28 points, 13 rebounds and 4 assists.

=== Plymouth Raiders (2019–2020) ===
Before the 2019–2020 season, Daniel signed with the Plymouth Raiders of the British Basketball League, where he averaged 16.6 points, 4.4 rebounds and 1.1 steals in seven games.

=== UBSC Graz (2020–2021) ===
On January 31, 2020, Daniel signed with UBSC Graz of the Austrian Basketball Superliga.

=== Mykolaiv (2021) ===
In 2021, Daniel signed with Mykolaiv of the Ukrainian Basketball SuperLeague, where he averaged 9.8 points and 4 rebounds.

=== Comunicaciones (2022) ===
On January 19, 2022, Daniel signed with Comunicaciones of the Liga Nacional de Básquetbol, averaging 18.7 points, 3 rebounds and 0.6 assists in six games.

=== Caballeros de Culiacán (2022) ===
On March 17, 2022, Daniel signed with the Caballeros de Culiacán of the Circuito de Baloncesto de la Costa del Pacífico, where he averaged 19 points and 6.7 rebounds in 22 games while shooting 42% from the three-point line.

=== Sudbury Five (2023–2024) ===
On October 29, 2023, Daniel joined the College Park Skyhawks of the NBA G League, but was waived on November 6. On December 7, he signed with the Sudbury Five of the Basketball Super League where he averaged 15 points, 5.4 rebounds and 1.1 assists in seven games.

=== Wisconsin Herd (2024) ===
On February 27, 2024, Daniel signed with the Wisconsin Herd of the NBA G League, but was waived on March 4, after one game where he scored 10 points, 5 rebounds, 2 assists, 2steals in only 15 minutes of play.

=== Oklahoma City Blue (2024) ===
On March 8, 2024, Daniel signed with the Oklahoma City Blue, where he won a title.

On October 26, 2024, Daniel signed with the South Bay Lakers, but was waived on November 6.

=== Mayrouba Club (2024–2025) ===
On December 28, 2024, Daniel signed with the Mayrouba Club of the Lebanese Basketball League.

== Personal life ==
The son of Carolyn and Sam Daniel, he has two sisters.
