= Ryan Seymour =

American football player (born 1990)

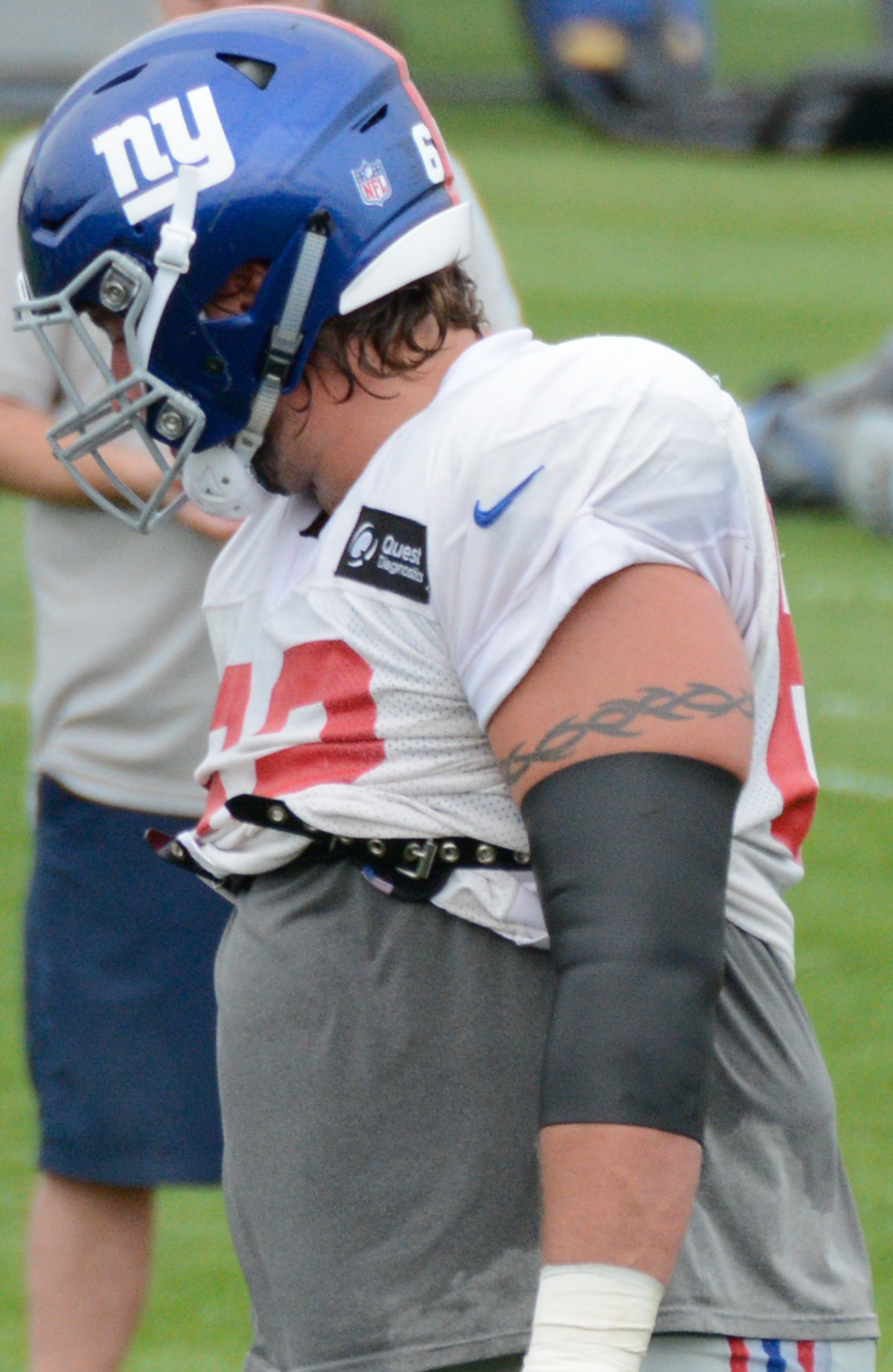
- Seymour with the New York Giants in 2016

No. 62
- Position: Offensive guard

Personal information
- Born: February 7, 1990 (age 36); Charleston, South Carolina, U.S.
- Listed height: 6 ft 4 in (1.93 m)
- Listed weight: 305 lb (138 kg)

Career information
- High school: Camden County (Kingsland, Georgia)
- College: Vanderbilt
- NFL draft: 2013: 7th round, 220th overall pick

Career history
- Seattle Seahawks (2013)*; San Francisco 49ers (2013); Cleveland Browns (2014); Chicago Bears (2015)*; New Orleans Saints (2015); New York Giants (2016)*; Dallas Cowboys (2016)
- * Offseason or practice squad member only

Career NFL statistics
- Games played: 12
- Games started: 3
- Stats at Pro Football Reference

Ryan R. Seymour (born February 7, 1990) is an American former professional football player who was an offensive guard in the National Football League (NFL). He was selected by the Seattle Seahawks in the seventh round of the 2013 NFL draft. He was also a member of the San Francisco 49ers, Cleveland Browns, Chicago Bears, New Orleans Saints, New York Giants and Dallas Cowboys. He played college football for the Vanderbilt Commodores.

== Early life ==
He attended Camden County High School (GA) where he earned three letters in football as a two-way starter (DE & OG), and earned three letters as a varsity golfer. He was selected to the Georgia All-State AAAAA First Team (DE) by sportswriters and also named to "Jacksonville Times-Union"'s Georgia "Super South 11" team.

== College career ==
Seymour started all 13 games as a senior in 2012 and concluded his Vanderbilt career with 35 starting assignments including starts at LG, LT, RG, and RT. Seymour opened the 2012 season with nine straight starts at left guard, then moved to start at both tackle positions when injuries affected depth along the line. He was selected to the 2009 SEC All-Freshman team. He was named to the SEC Academic Honor Roll 2011 and 2012.

Seymour graduated from Vanderbilt University with a Bachelor of Science degree in December 2012.

== Professional career ==
Pre-draft measurables
Height	Weight	Arm length	Hand span	40-yard dash	10-yard split	20-yard split	20-yard shuttle	Three-cone drill	Vertical jump	Broad jump	Bench press
6 ft 4 3/8 in (1.94 m)	301 lb (137 kg)	33 5/8 in (0.85 m)	10 1/8 in (0.26 m)	5.09 s	1.69 s	2.90 s	4.59 s	7.53 s	29 1/2 in (0.75 m)	9 ft 2 in (2.79 m)	30 reps
All values from College Pro Day

=== Seattle Seahawks ===
He was selected by the Seattle Seahawks in the seventh round (220nd pick overall) of the 2013 NFL draft.

On August 31, 2013, Seymour was released by the Seahawks, and was re-signed to the Seahawks practice squad on September 11, 2013.

=== San Francisco 49ers ===
On December 10, 2013, the San Francisco 49ers signed Seymour from the Seattle Seahawks' practice squad.

=== Cleveland Browns ===
Seymour was claimed off waivers by the Cleveland Browns on August 31. He was waived on September 9, 2014, and re-signed to the 53 man roster on October 17, 2014.

On August 17, 2015, Seymour was suspended without pay for the first four games of the regular season for violating the NFL policy on performance-enhancing substances and was subsequently waived by the Cleveland Browns on August 27, 2015.

=== Chicago Bears ===
On October 7, 2015, the Chicago Bears signed Seymour to their practice squad. On October 13, 2015, Seymour was cut from the Bears practice squad.

=== New Orleans Saints ===
Seymour was signed to the New Orleans Saints practice squad on October 20, 2015. On December 26, 2015, the New Orleans Saints promoted Seymour to the 53-men roster and waived cornerback Tony Carter.

=== New York Giants ===
Seymour signed with the New York Giants on April 4, 2016. On September 3, 2016, he was released by the Giants.

=== Dallas Cowboys ===
On October 11, 2016, Seymour was signed to the Cowboys' practice squad. On December 30, he was promoted to the active roster, because he was needed for depth purposes in the last game of the season, in order to rest some of the starters for the playoffs. He was released on January 4, 2017. He was re-signed on February 16, 2017.

On April 21, 2017, Seymour announced his retirement from the NFL.
