= Micah Morris =

American football player (born 2003)

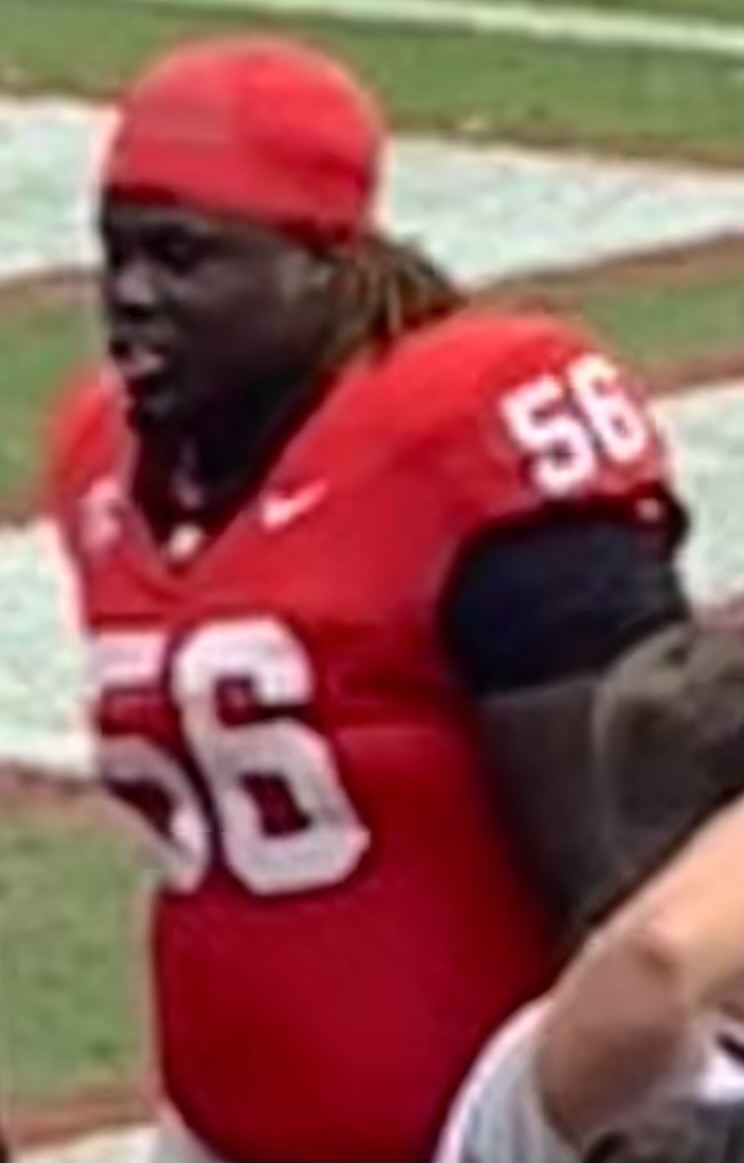
- Morris in 2025

No. 76 – Philadelphia Eagles
- Position: Guard
- Roster status: Active

Personal information
- Born: August 25, 2003 (age 23); Camden County, Georgia, U.S.
- Listed height: 6 ft 5 in (1.96 m)
- Listed weight: 334 lb (151 kg)

Career information
- High school: Camden County (Kingsland, Georgia)
- College: Georgia (2021–2025)
- NFL draft: 2026: 6th round, 207th overall pick

Career history
- Philadelphia Eagles (2026–present)

Awards and highlights
- 2× CFP national champion (2021, 2022); Second-team All-SEC (2025)

Career NFL statistics as of Week 4, 2026
- Games played: 2
- Stats at Pro Football Reference

Micah Thurman Morris (born August 25, 2003) is an American professional football guard for the Philadelphia Eagles of the National Football League (NFL). He played college football for the Georgia Bulldogs and was selected by the Eagles in the sixth round of the 2026 NFL draft.

== Early life ==
Micah Morris was born on August 25, 2003 in Camden County, Georgia. He was introduced to football by his father when Morris was five, first participating in flag football, and then playing on the defensive line for his middle school's football team. Morris attended Camden County High School in his hometown of Kingsland, Georgia, where he played continued playing football. He switched his position to offensive lineman for Camden County as a freshman, and maintained that position for the entirety of his high school career. Following his junior year, Morris was named a consensus first-team all-state selection. Because of this, Morris was named to the 2020 iteration of the Atlanta Journal-Constitution's "Super 11", an annual list of the top eleven high school seniors for football in the state of Georgia. Following Morris' senior season, where he played both offensive and defensive line amidst battling injuries, he was invited to play in the All-American Bowl. Morris also excelled academically in high school, with him having a 5.025 GPA after factoring in advanced placement and dual enrollment classes.

=== Recruiting ===
Morris initially quietly committed to the University of Georgia in August 2019. He had built up a strong relationship with Sam Pittman, Georgia's offensive line coach at the time. However, after Pittman departed to become the head coach at Arkansas, Morris opened up his recruiting to other schools. Morris then established a good relationship with the new offensive line coach at Georgia, Matt Luke, and declared his public commitment to Georgia in April of 2020 over schools such as Alabama and Clemson.

== College career ==
Morris enrolled early at Georgia in 2021 and redshirted his freshman year, only playing in two games. In 2022, Morris continued to play as a reserve offensive lineman. Morris began to see more playing time in 2023, with him acting as a sixth man for Georgia's offensive line, being substituted in occasionally for another starter at either guard or tackle. In 2024, Morris made his first start against Alabama. Morris started five games that season, before a leg injury against Florida hindered his ability to play. Morris returned to Georgia in 2025 as one of two players remaining from 2021 and as a starter. During the season, Morris sustained a leg injury against Alabama that temporarily took him out of the game and a shoulder injury the following week against Kentucky. Nevertheless, Morris was awarded a selection to the All-SEC second-team by the Associated Press following the regular season.

== Professional career ==
Pre-draft measurables
Height	Weight	Arm length	Hand span	Wingspan	40-yard dash	10-yard split	20-yard split	Vertical jump	Broad jump	Bench press
6 ft 5 1/4 in (1.96 m)	334 lb (151 kg)	33 5/8 in (0.85 m)	10 3/8 in (0.26 m)	6 ft 11 1/2 in (2.12 m)	5.09 s	1.73 s	2.91 s	29.5 in (0.75 m)	9 ft 4 in (2.84 m)	29 reps
All values from NFL Combine

Morris was selected by the Philadelphia Eagles in the sixth round with the 207th pick in the 2026 NFL Draft. He officially signed a rookie scale contract for four years on May 1.
