= Jarrad Davis =

American football player (born 1994)

No. 40, 52, 57
- Position: Linebacker

Personal information
- Born: November 16, 1994 (age 31); Kingsland, Georgia, U.S.
- Listed height: 6 ft 1 in (1.85 m)
- Listed weight: 238 lb (108 kg)

Career information
- High school: Camden County (Kingsland)
- College: Florida (2013–2016)
- NFL draft: 2017: 1st round, 21st overall pick

Career history
- Detroit Lions (2017–2020); New York Jets (2021); Detroit Lions (2022); New York Giants (2022–2023)

Awards and highlights
- PFWA All-Rookie Team (2017); Second-team All-SEC (2016)

Career NFL statistics as of 2023
- Total tackles: 344
- Sacks: 11
- Forced fumbles: 7
- Fumble recoveries: 3
- Interceptions: 1
- Pass deflections: 10
- Stats at Pro Football Reference

Jarrad Davis (born November 16, 1994) is an American former professional football player who was a linebacker in the National Football League (NFL). He played college football for the Florida Gators and was selected by the Detroit Lions in the first round of the 2017 NFL draft.

== Early life ==
Davis attended Camden County High School in Kingsland, Georgia. As a senior, he had 114 tackles and three forced fumbles for the Wildcats football team. He originally committed to Auburn University to play college football but changed his commitment to the University of Florida.

== College career ==
As a true freshman at Florida in 2013, Davis played in all 12 games with one start, recording 24 tackles. As a sophomore in 2014, he played in nine games and missed three due to a torn meniscus, finishing with 23 tackles. As a junior in 2015, he started 12 of 14 games, recording 98 tackles, 3.5 sacks, and one interception. Davis started 9 games as a senior, missing 4 games due to injury. He recorded 60 tackles, 2 sacks, and 4 pass deflections in 2016, earning him Second-Team All-Southeastern Conference recognition.

== Professional career ==
=== Pre-draft ===
On December 12, 2016, it was announced that Davis had accepted his invitation to play in the 2017 Senior Bowl. Unfortunately, Davis was unable to attend after suffering a sprained ankle during his senior season. Davis was one of 29 collegiate linebackers who attended the NFL Scouting Combine, but was unable to perform any drills due to an ankle injury. On March 28, 2017, Davis attended Florida's Pro Day and performed all of the combine and positional drills for team representatives and scouts who attended. His 40-yard dash would've been the second fastest time among all linebackers at the NFL Combine. During the draft process, Davis attended private visits and workouts with the Detroit Lions and Pittsburgh Steelers. NFL Draft experts and analysts projected Davis to be selected in the first or second round. He was ranked the second best inside linebacker in the draft by NFLDraftScout.com, was ranked the third best inside linebacker by NFL analyst Bucky Brooks, was ranked the third best linebacker by NFL analyst Mike Mayock, and was ranked the fourth best linebacker in the draft by Sports Illustrated and ESPN.

Pre-draft measurables
Height	Weight	Arm length	Hand span	40-yard dash	10-yard split	20-yard split	20-yard shuttle	Three-cone drill	Vertical jump	Broad jump	Bench press
6 ft 1 3/8 in (1.86 m)	238 lb (108 kg)	33 1/2 in (0.85 m)	9 3/4 in (0.25 m)	4.62 s	1.57 s	2.64 s	4.29 s	7.39 s	38.5 in (0.98 m)	10 ft 9 in (3.28 m)	23 reps
All values from NFL Combine/Florida's Pro Day

=== Detroit Lions (first stint) ===
==== 2017 ====
The Lions selected Davis in the first round (21st overall) of the 2017 NFL draft. He was the second linebacker selected, behind Haason Reddick.

On May 12, 2017, the Lions signed Davis to a four-year, $10.96 million contract that includes $8.54 million guaranteed and a signing bonus of $6.11 million.

Davis entered training camp, slated as the starting middle linebacker. Head coach Jim Caldwell officially named Davis the starting middle linebacker to begin the regular season.

He started the Lions' season-opener against the Arizona Cardinals and recorded nine solo tackles and recovered the first fumble of his career by Cardinals' running back David Johnson in their 35-23 victory. The following week, he recorded six combined tackles and made the first sack of his career on New York Giants quarterback Eli Manning in the Lions' 24-10 victory. Unfortunately, he left the game in the fourth quarter after suffering a concussion when Giants wide receiver Odell Beckham Jr. blocked Davis into Giants running back Paul Perkins. He remained in concussion protocol and missed the next two games due to concussion symptoms. On December 10, 2017, Davis made nine combined tackles and sacked quarterback Jameis Winston as the Lions defeated the Tampa Bay Buccaneers 24-21. In Week 17, he recorded a season-high 12 combined tackles, a pass deflection, and made his first career interception in a 35-11 win against the Green Bay Packers. He made his interception off of a pass attempt by Brett Hundley that was intended for Jamaal Williams and returned it for 12 yards before being tackled by Lance Kendricks to end the Packers' first drive of the game. He finished his rookie season with 96 combined tackles (65 solo), three pass deflections, two sacks, an interception, a forced fumble, and a fumble recovery in 14 games and 14 starts. He was named to the PFWA All-Rookie Team. The Detroit Lions finished second in the NFC North with a 9-7 record but missed the playoffs, and thus the team decided to part ways with head coach Jim Caldwell at the end of the season.

==== 2019 ====
Davis entered the 2019 season as the Lions' starting middle linebacker. He started 11 games before being placed on injured reserve on December 14, 2019. He finished the season with 63 tackles, two sacks, and three forced fumbles.

==== 2020 ====
On May 2, 2020, the Lions declined the fifth-year option on Davis' contract, making him a free agent in 2021. He was placed on the reserve/COVID-19 list by the team on November 3, 2020, and activated six days later.

=== New York Jets ===
On March 18, 2021, Davis signed with the New York Jets. He was placed on injured reserve on September 1, 2021. He was activated on October 30.

=== Detroit Lions (second stint) ===
On March 25, 2022, Jarrad Davis signed a deal to return to the Lions. He was released on August 30, and signed to the practice squad the next day.

=== New York Giants ===
On December 28, 2022, Davis was signed by the Giants off of the Lions' practice squad. He re-signed with the team on March 8, 2023. During OTAs, Davis suffered a knee injury and as a result, on July 18, the Giants placed him on injured reserve, ending his 2023 season.

== NFL career statistics ==
Year	Team	GP	GS	Tackles				Fumbles				Interceptions				
Year	Team	GP	Cmb	Solo	Ast	Sck	FF	FR	Yds	TD	Int	Yds	Avg	Lng	TD	PD
2017	DET	14	96	65	31	2.0	1	1	16	0	1	12	12.0	12	0	3
2018	DET	16	99	73	26	6.0	1	1	20	0	0	0	0.0	0	0	5
2019	DET	11	63	38	25	2.0	3	1	0	0	0	0	0.0	0	0	1
Total		41	259	176	83	10.0	5	3	36	0	1	12	12.0	12	0	9
