= Josh Whyle =

American football player (born 1999)

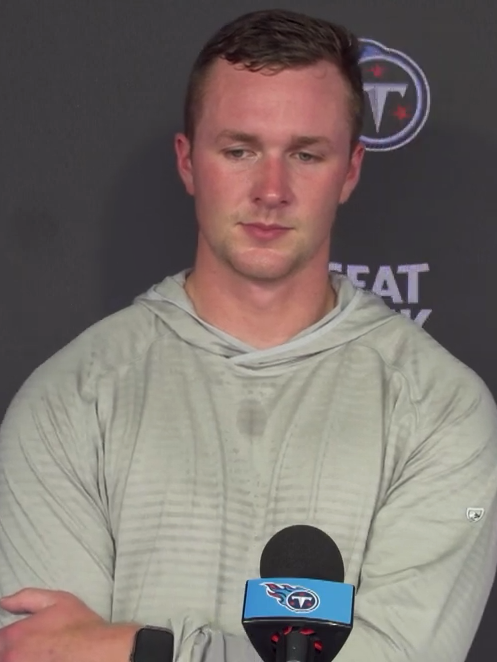
- Whyle in 2023

No. 81 – Green Bay Packers
- Position: Tight end
- Roster status: Injured reserve

Personal information
- Born: September 8, 1999 (age 27); Cincinnati, Ohio, U.S.
- Listed height: 6 ft 7 in (2.01 m)
- Listed weight: 248 lb (112 kg)

Career information
- High school: La Salle (Cincinnati)
- College: Cincinnati (2018–2022)
- NFL draft: 2023: 5th round, 147th overall pick

Career history
- Tennessee Titans (2023–2024); Green Bay Packers (2025–present)

Awards and highlights
- First-team All-AAC (2022); Second team All-AAC (2020)

Career NFL statistics as of 2026
- Receptions: 42
- Receiving yards: 378
- Receiving touchdowns: 3
- Stats at Pro Football Reference

Joshua James Whyle (born September 8, 1999) is an American professional football tight end for the Green Bay Packers of the National Football League (NFL). He played college football for the Cincinnati Bearcats.

== Early life ==
Whyle grew up in Cincinnati, Ohio and attended La Salle High School. As a junior, he caught 40 passes for 546 yards and six touchdowns. Whyle had 37 receptions for 442 yards and three touchdowns in his senior seasons. Whyle was rated the second-best Tight End recruit in Ohio and committed to play college football at Cincinnati over offers from Auburn, Georgia, Indiana, Kentucky, Louisville, Tennessee and Wisconsin.

== College career ==
Whyle played in four total games during his freshman season before utilizing a redshirt. As a redshirt freshman, he caught two passes for 51 yards. Whyle finished his redshirt sophomore season with 28 receptions for 353 yards and six touchdowns and was named second team All-American Athletic Conference.

=== Statistics ===
Season	Team	Games	Receiving				
Season	Team	Games	Rec	Yds	Avg	TD	Long
2019	Cincinnati	2	2	51	25.5	0	32
2020	Cincinnati	10	28	353	12.6	6	30
2021	Cincinnati	13	26	332	12.8	6	31
2022	Cincinnati	12	32	326	10.2	3	35
Career		37	88	1062	12.1	15	35
Source: sports-reference.com

== Professional career ==
Pre-draft measurables
Height	Weight	Arm length	Hand span	Wingspan	40-yard dash	10-yard split	20-yard split	20-yard shuttle	Three-cone drill	Vertical jump	Broad jump	Bench press
6 ft 6 1/2 in (1.99 m)	248 lb (112 kg)	31 1/2 in (0.80 m)	9 1/2 in (0.24 m)	6 ft 5 3/8 in (1.97 m)	4.69 s	1.61 s	2.68 s	4.40 s	7.15 s	33.5 in (0.85 m)	9 ft 7 in (2.92 m)	15 reps
All values from NFL Combine/Pro Day

=== Tennessee Titans ===
Whyle was selected by the Tennessee Titans in the fifth round, 147th overall, of the 2023 NFL draft. In Week 4, he scored his first NFL touchdown against the Bengals. As a rookie, he appeared in 11 games and started three in the 2023 season. He finished with nine receptions for 94 yards and a touchdown.

During the 2024 season, Whyle played all 17 games and made 28 receptions for 248 yards and one touchdown.

On August 26, 2025, Whyle was waived by the Titans as part of final roster cuts.

=== Green Bay Packers ===
On August 28, 2025, Whyle signed with the Green Bay Packers' practice squad. He was signed to the active roster on November 4. He was placed on injured reserve on November 14, 2026.

== NFL career statistics ==
Legend
**Bold**	Career high

=== Regular season ===
Year	Team	Games		Receiving					Fumbles	
Year	Team	GP	GS	Rec	Yds	Y/R	Lng	TD	Fum	Lost
2023	TEN	11	3	9	94	**10.4**	24	1	0	0
2024	TEN	**17**	**4**	**28**	**248**	8.9	**33**	1	0	0
2025	GB	8	1	5	36	7.2	21	1	0	0
Career		36	8	42	378	10.5	33	3	1	0
Source: pro-football-reference.com

=== Postseason ===
Year	Team	Games		Receiving					Fumbles	
Year	Team	GP	GS	Rec	Yds	Y/R	Lng	TD	Fum	Lost
2025	GB	1	0	1	7	7.0	7	0	0	0
Career		4	2	7	75	10.7	38	1	0	0
Source: pro-football-reference.com
