= 2021 Cotton Bowl Classic =

College Football Playoff Semifinal bowl game

2021 Goodyear Cotton Bowl Classic
- College Football Playoff Semifinal; 86th Cotton Bowl Classic
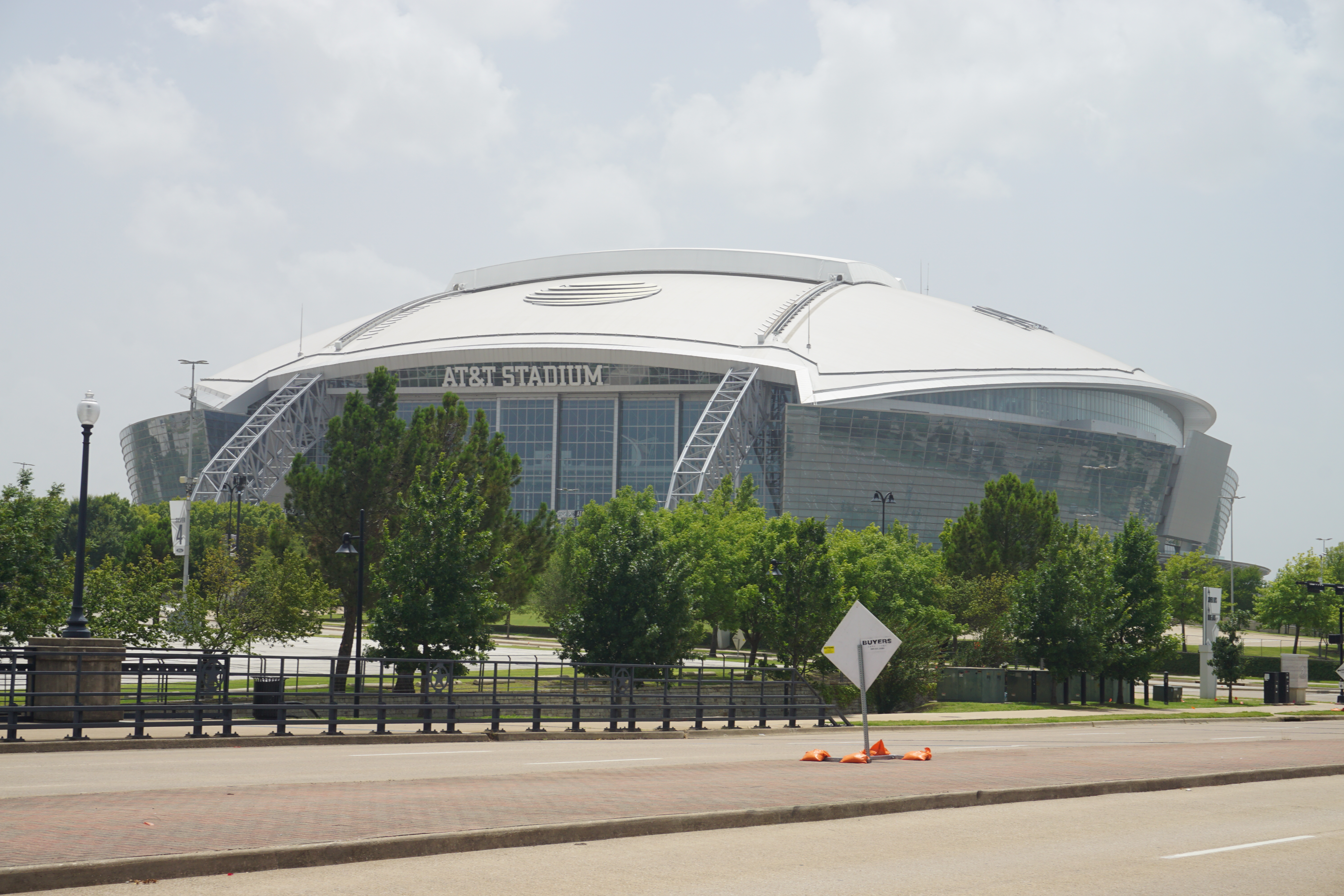
- AT&T Stadium in Arlington, Texas, hosted the Cotton Bowl Classic.
Cincinnati Bearcats	Alabama Crimson Tide
(13–0)	(12–1)
AAC	SEC
6	27
Head coach: Luke Fickell	Head coach: Nick Saban
AP / Coaches / CFP; 4 / 4 / 4	AP / Coaches / CFP; 1 / 1 / 1
	1	2	3	4	Total
Cincinnati	3	0	3	0	6
Alabama	7	10	0	10	27
- Date: December 31, 2021
- Season: 2021
- Stadium: AT&T Stadium
- Location: Arlington, Texas
- MVP: Brian Robinson Jr. (RB, Alabama); Will Anderson Jr. (OLB, Alabama)
- Favorite: Alabama by 13
- Referee: Steve Strimling (Pac-12)
- Attendance: 76,313

United States TV coverage
- Network: ESPN; ESPN Radio
- Announcers: ESPN: Sean McDonough (play-by-play), Todd Blackledge (color), Molly McGrath, and Laura Rutledge (sidelines); ESPN Radio: Sean Kelley (play-by-play), Barrett Jones (analyst) and Ian Fitzsimmons (sideline)
- Nielsen ratings: 16.6 million viewers

International TV coverage
- Network: ESPN Brazil
- Announcers: Matheus Suman (play-by-play) and Weinny Eirado (analyst)

The 2021 Cotton Bowl Classic was a college football bowl game played on December 31, 2021, at AT&T Stadium in Arlington, Texas. The 86th edition of the Cotton Bowl Classic and the first of two College Football Playoff semifinal games, the game featured two of the four teams selected by the College Football Playoff Selection Committee- the No. 1 Alabama Crimson Tide from the Southeastern Conference and the No. 4 Cincinnati Bearcats from the American Athletic Conference; the latter becoming the first Group of Five team to appear in a College Football Playoff, and the season's last major undefeated team in the FBS. The winner advanced to face the winner of the Orange Bowl at the 2022 College Football Playoff National Championship, which is at Lucas Oil Stadium in Indianapolis.

The game began at 2:30 p.m. CST and aired on ESPN. The game was one of the 2021–22 bowl games concluding the 2021 FBS football season. Sponsored by the Goodyear Tire and Rubber Company, the game was officially known as the College Football Playoff Semifinal at the Goodyear Cotton Bowl Classic.

== Teams ==
This game marked the sixth meeting between the two teams; Alabama has won all previous meetings, most recently playing in 1990. This is also Alabama's second consecutive year playing at AT&T Stadium, as the 2021 Rose Bowl was also played in Arlington owing to California pandemic restrictions.

=== Alabama ===
15th-year head coach Nick Saban and the top-ranked Crimson Tide opened their season with a contest against No. 14 Miami (FL) in the Chick-fil-A Kickoff Game. The Tide won convincingly to earn a 1–0 start to their national title defense. They opened their home season with a win against FCS Mercer, and followed it with their first SEC contest at No. 11 Florida, which saw Alabama escape an upset bid with a two-point win. Alabama would rout Southern Miss the following week, before defeating No. 12 Ole Miss by three touchdowns at home to extend their streak to six consecutive wins in that rivalry series. The Tide suffered their first and only regular season setback the following week, when they were upset by Texas A&M in College Station, which gave the Aggies a three-point victory. This loss snapped a 19-game winning streak for the Tide and dropped Alabama to No. 5 in the AP Poll, though they were able to rebound with impressive wins over Mississippi State and Tennessee to put their record at 7–1 entering their bye week. To begin the month of November, the Crimson Tide hosted LSU, whom they defeated by six points; Alabama then defeated New Mexico State, their final non-conference opponent, by a score of 59–3. The Tide's final home game came against No. 21 Arkansas; Alabama won by only a touchdown despite quarterback Bryce Young's school-record 559 passing yards, and the Tide dropped to No. 3 in the College Football Playoff rankings. With the win, Alabama clinched the SEC West Division title and their spot in the SEC Championship Game. The Crimson Tide concluded their regular season a week later with an Iron Bowl matchup against Auburn; the game went to four overtimes before Alabama came away with a two-point victory; this was the first game in Iron Bowl history to reach overtime. The Crimson Tide then defeated No. 1 Georgia in the 2021 SEC Championship Game, bumping them back to No. 1 and earning them a place in the playoff. They enter the semifinal game with a record of 12–1 and a 7–1 mark in conference play.

=== Cincinnati ===
The Bearcats started their 2021 season ranked 8th, after easy wins over Miami (Ohio) and FCS Murray State, the Bearcats traveled to Bloomington to face Big Ten foe Indiana and defeated the Hoosiers 38-24, rallying from an early 14-0 deficit. After a bye, the Bearcats traveled to South Bend to face Notre Dame defeating the 9th ranked Irish, leading all the way to a 24-13 win. Returning home the Bearcats notched back to back 50 point games in home wins over Temple and Central Florida. The next three wins were markedly more difficult as they struggled to handle Navy's unique triple option offense but hung on for a 27-20 win; trailed early but used a steady 2nd half to defeat Tulane 31-12 in New Orleans and needed a late goal line stand to fend off Tulsa for Homecoming 28-20. The Bearcats rolled through the rest of their conference schedule more easily routing South Florida in Tampa 45-28, scoring the first 41 points and carrying a shutout into the 4th in routing Southern Methodist 48-14 and completing an unbeaten regular season with a 35-13 win over East Carolina. The Bearcats finished their regular season with a 12–0 record, 8–0 in AAC play, completing only their second 12-0 season in school history (2009) Facing 21st ranked Houston in the AAC Championship Game, the Bearcats broke open a tight 14-13 halftime with 21 3rd quarter points to claim a 35-20 and win their 2nd straight American Conference title. The Bearcats were ranked 4th in the final CFP poll and entered the Cotton Bowl with a 13–0 record and ranked fourth in all major polls. The program's most recent loss was to Georgia in the Peach Bowl on January 1, 2021.

== Game summary ==
=== First half ===
After winning the coin toss and deferring, Cincinnati kicker Alex Bales began the game with a touchback, giving Alabama the ball on their own 25-yard-line to start their first drive. The Crimson Tide used the run game effectively, keeping the ball on the ground for the game's first ten plays. Running back Brian Robinson Jr. earned each of the first four carries of the game, and the Tide capped the drive with an eight-yard touchdown pass from Bryce Young to Slade Bolden. Cincinnati's offense began their first drive after a touchback as well, and the Bearcats were able to move the ball but had to mix the run and the pass more so than Alabama; a 19-yard pass from Desmond Ridder to Michael Young Jr. took the ball into Alabama territory, and a 22-yard pass from Ridder to Tyler Scott took Cincinnati inside the Alabama 10-yard-line. However, Cincinnati stalled, as they were unable to gain yards on first and second down and lost yardage on third down, forcing a 33-yard field goal attempt that was successful. Alabama's second drive saw them move the ball just as effectively; an offside penalty on Cincinnati on 3rd & 9 allowed Alabama to more easily convert for a first down, which they did with a 16-yard pass on the next play. The Tide moved the ball to the Cincinnati 9-yard-line before Bryce Young was sacked back to the 15-yard-line, though he rushed for 12 yards to the Cincinnati 3-yard-line in the quarter's final play.

An Alabama false start pushed the ball back to the Cincinnati 8-yard-line, and Alabama kicker Will Reichard converted a 26-yard field goal to reinstate the Crimson Tide's seven-point lead. This started a stretch of the game in which both offenses failed to produce results. The game's first three-and-out came on Cincinnati's next possession, as DJ Dale's sack on second down forced a third-and-long which the Bearcats could not convert. Alabama saw similar results on their next drive; after starting their possession on their own 33-yard-line following the punt, an illegal formation penalty forced them behind the line of scrimmage, and they were not able to recover, eventually punting on 4th & 14. The Bearcats punted the ball back rather quickly, as their offense gained six yards in their next drive's three plays and went three-and-out for a second time. Alabama's offense took over at their own 9-yard-line and was again able to move the ball, as they reached Cincinnati territory in six plays and found themselves facing 4th & 26 after another six plays, setting them up for a 44-yard field goal attempt, which was missed wide left by Will Reichard. For the third consecutive drive, Cincinnati was forced to punt after a three-and-out, though they nearly recovered the ball right back after the punt was muffed by JoJo Earle. The ball was eventually recovered by Jameson Williams at the Alabama 6-yard-line, where the Crimson Tide started their final drive of the half. Alabama drove to the Cincinnati 44-yard-line in seven plays before Bryce Young connected with Ja'Corey Brooks for a 44-yard touchdown pass, extending their lead to two scores. Cincinnati regained possession with just over a minute and a half remaining but was unable to capitalize; Desmond Ridder was sacked on the half's final play and the game went to halftime with Alabama leading, 17–3.

=== Second half ===
Cincinnati got possession of the ball to begin the game's second half, as Will Reichard's kickoff went through the end zone for a touchback. Cincinnati moved the ball down the field quickly to open the quarter, finding themselves in Alabama territory in just four plays, but stalled just inside the red zone and the Bearcats had to settle for their second field goal try, this one from 37 yards, which was made by Cole Smith. Cincinnati's defense came out of the half playing well, too; they gave up a first down but eventually forced Alabama to punt on their first possession of the quarter, giving their offense the ball back at the Cincinnati 29-yard-line. The quarter nearly halfway over already, Cincinnati faced a 4th & 4 at their own 35-yard-line but suffered a delay of game penalty, which pushed them back five yards. Mason Fletcher's punt was fair caught at the Alabama 26-yard-line, but Alabama gave the ball right back; Bryce Young threw a pass which was intercepted by Bryan Cook at the Cincinnati 49-yard-line. An illegal shift penalty on Cincinnati's next play pushed the offense back to a 1st & 15, and a sack on third down forced a punt on fourth-and-long. Alabama took over at their own 30-yard-line, and ran six plays, reaching the Cincinnati 44-yard-line, before the end of the third quarter.

The Crimson Tide offense reached the red zone within two additional plays, and the drive concluded with an Alabama touchdown by way of a nine-yard pass from Bryce Young to Cameron Latu, extending the lead to eighteen points. Cincinnati took the ball back over at their own 25-yard-line; a 28-yard pass from Ridder to Michael Young Jr. took the Bearcats into Alabama territory, but Cincinnati stalled at the Crimson Tide 22-yard-line with a 4th & 3, which they failed to convert, giving Alabama the ball back at the Crimson Tide 26-yard-line. Brian Robinson Jr. carried the ball on each of Alabama's next three plays, and Trey Sanders got each of the next four carries, setting the Tide up for a 43-yard field goal, which was made by Reichard. Cincinnati, now trailing by three touchdowns, got the ball back with just over six minutes to play; they got to the Alabama 38-yard-line but again faced a 4th down, this one with five yards to gain. Ridder's pass was incomplete, giving Alabama the ball back again for what would be the final time. Getting the ball with three minutes remaining, Alabama was able to run five more plays and run the rest of the clock out, cementing their victory, and thus, for the first time since 2018, insuring that the 2021-2022 season will end with no undefeated teams in the FBS system.

=== Scoring summary ===
College Football Playoff Semifinal at the 2021 Goodyear Cotton Bowl Classic

Quarter	1	2	3	4	Total
No. 4 Cincinnati	3	0	3	0	6
No. 1 Alabama	7	10	0	10	27

at AT&T Stadium • Arlington, Texas

- Date: Friday, December 31, 2021
- Game time: 2:30 p.m. CST
- Game weather: n/a (game played indoors)
- Game attendance: 76,313
- Referee: Steve Strimling
- TV announcers (ESPN): Sean McDonough (play-by-play), Todd Blackledge (color), Laura Rutledge and Molly McGrath (sidelines)
- Box score

Scoring summary

Quarter	Time	Drive			Team	Scoring information	Score	
Quarter	Time	Plays	Yards	TOP	Team	Scoring information	Cincinnati	Alabama
1	9:51	11	75	5:09	Alabama	Slade Bolden 8-yard touchdown reception from Bryce Young, Will Reichard kick good	0	7
1	4:52	13	60	4:59	Cincinnati	33-yard field goal by Cole Smith	3	7
2	14:56	13	67	4:56	Alabama	26-yard field goal by Will Reichard	3	10
2	1:36	8	94	2:03	Alabama	Ja'Corey Brooks 44-yard touchdown reception from Bryce Young, Will Reichard kick good	3	17
3	9:57	11	56	5:03	Cincinnati	37-yard field goal by Cole Smith	6	17
4	13:52	9	70	4:02	Alabama	Cameron Latu 9-yard touchdown reception from Bryce Young, Will Reichard kick good	6	24
4	6:20	9	49	4:02	Alabama	43-yard field goal by Will Reichard	6	27
"TOP" = time of possession. For other American football terms, see Glossary of American football.							6	27

== Statistics ==
=== Team statistics ===
Team statistical comparison
Statistic	Cincinnati	Alabama
First downs	13	27
First downs rushing	6	16
First downs passing	7	10
First downs penalty	0	1
Third down efficiency	2–12	5–13
Fourth down efficiency	0–3	1–1
Total plays–net yards	58–218	75–482
Rushing attempts–net yards	26–74	47–301
Yards per rush	2.8	6.4
Yards passing	144	181
Pass completions–attempts	17–32	17–28
Interceptions thrown	0	1
Punt returns–total yards	1–12	4–(−8)
Kickoff returns–total yards	1–40	1–15
Punts–average yardage	5–45.2	2–44.0
Fumbles–lost	0–0	1–0
Penalties–yards	6–39	6–36
Time of possession	26:19	33:41

=== Individual statistics ===
Cincinnati statistics
Bearcats passing
	C–A	Yds	TD–INT
Desmond Ridder	17–32	144	0–0
Bearcats rushing
	Car	Yds	TD
Jerome Ford	15	77	0
Ryan Montgomery	1	3	0
Desmond Ridder	10	−6	0
Bearcats receiving
	Rec	Yds	TD
Michael Young Jr.	4	55	0
Tyler Scott	4	43	0
Alec Pierce	2	17	0
Josh Whyle	1	12	0
Tre Tucker	2	12	0
Jerome Ford	3	11	0
Leonard Taylor	1	−6	0

Alabama statistics
Crimson Tide passing
	C–A	Yds	TD–INT
Bryce Young	17–28	181	3–1
Crimson Tide rushing
	Car	Yds	TD
Brian Robinson Jr.	26	204	0
Trey Sanders	14	67	0
Jameson Williams	1	18	0
Bryce Young	6	12	0
Crimson Tide receiving
	Rec	Yds	TD
Ja'Corey Brooks	4	66	1
Jameson Williams	7	62	0
Slade Bolden	3	31	0
Jahleel Billingsley	1	12	0
Cameron Latu	1	9	0
Trey Sanders	1	1	0
