= Camden County High School (Georgia) =

Secondary school in Kingsland, Georgia, US

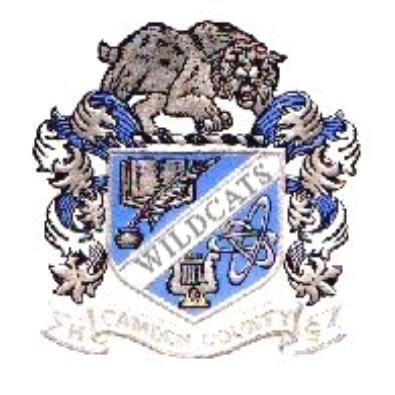

Location
- 6300 Laurel Island Parkway; Kingsland, Camden County, Georgia 31548-6080; United States; 30°49′25″N 81°39′08″W

Information
- School type: Public, secondary
- Established: 1973 (53 years ago)
- School district: Camden County Schools
- Superintendent: Dr. Tracolya Green
- CEEB code: 113285
- Principal: Dr. James Phillips
- Staff: 179.10 (FTE)
- Grades: 9th-12th
- Enrollment: 2,912 (2025-2026)
- Student to teacher ratio: 16.00
- Colors: Columbia blue, navy, and white
- Mascot: Wildcat
- Website: wildcat.camden.k12.ga.us

Camden County High School (CCHS) is a public high school in Kingsland, Georgia, United States. It is the sole traditional secondary school operating within the Camden County School District, serving student communities across Kingsland, St. Marys, Woodbine, and the neighboring military population at Naval Submarine Base Kings Bay. The school serves grades 9 through 12.

== History ==
Camden County High School was established following sequential consolidations of localized secondary institutions within the county. Total racial integration in 1970 merged the student body of Ralph J. Bunche High School into Camden County High School, which was then operating out of Woodbine. The high school subsequently relocated to a new facility facility in St. Marys in 1971, before establishing its modern centralized campus in Kingsland.

The school saw substantial facility updates and physical footprint expansions matching the regional population surge following the late 1970s commissioning of the adjacent Naval Submarine Base Kings Bay, transitioning CCHS from a small rural high school into a large secondary facility.

== Academics ==
Camden County High School operates using a specialized Career Academy instructional model designed to establish smaller learning environments within the larger student baseline. Students register for academic pathways divided into specialized institutional tracks:

- Ninth Grade Academy: A dedicated transitional framework for incoming freshmen designed to ease development into high school curricula.
- Business Administration Academy
- Government and Public Services Academy
- Engineering, Architectural and Industrial Academy
- Health and Environmental Science Academy
- Fine Arts Academy

The school offers Advanced Placement (AP) courses, gifted student paths, and specialized Career, Technical, and Agricultural Education (CTAE) initiatives. CCHS partners directly with Coastal Pines Technical College to manage vocational dual enrollment tracks, enabling students to gain industry certifications and college credit in pathways such as welding, nursing, criminal investigations, and culinary arts alongside standard graduation requirements.

== Extracurricular activities ==
Beyond its core instructional departments, the campus hosts a variety of civic, academic, and creative student organizations, including chapters of the National FFA Organization (FFA), student government associations, and fine arts performance groups.

=== Athletics ===
The school's athletic teams compete as the Wildcats in the Georgia High School Association (GHSA).

In February 2019, the professional football team Orlando Apollos of the brief Alliance of American Football temporarily moved its core practice operations over to the high school's facilities. This arrangement stemmed from an interstate workers' compensation dispute within the state of Florida, leveraging Camden County's proximity across the Georgia state border.

==== State titles ====
- Football (3) - 2003(5A), 2008(5A), 2009(5A)
- Riflery (2) - 2023(All Class), 2024(All Class)
- Boys' Track (1) - 1999(4A)
- Girls' Track (1) - 1985(3A)
- Boys' Dual Wrestling (13) - 2012(5A), 2015(5A), 2016(5A), 2017(7A), 2018(7A), 2019(7A), 2020(7A), 2021(7A), 2022(7A), 2023(7A), 2024(7A), 2025(6A), 2026(6A)
- Boys' Traditional Wrestling (12) - 2015(5A), 2016(5A), 2017(7A), 2018(7A), 2019(7A), 2020(7A), 2021(7A), 2022(7A), 2023(7A), 2024(7A), 2025(6A), 2026(6A)
- Girls' Duals Wrestling (1) - 2026(D1)

== Notable alumni ==
- Stump Mitchell (1977), former NFL running back and coach
- Tyrone Jones (1980), former NFL and CFL linebacker
- Kevin Chaney (1991), local law enforcement officer serving as Sheriff of Camden County
- Travis Taylor (1997), former NFL wide receiver and Super Bowl champion
- Ryan Seymour (2008), former NFL offensive guard
- Scott McDonald (2008), author of A Bittersweet Pursuit
- Jarrad Davis (2013), NFL linebacker
- Sam Daniel (2014), professional basketball player
- Darryl Johnson (2014), NFL linebacker
- Myjai Sanders (2017), professional football linebacker
- Micah Morris (2021), offensive lineman for the Georgia Bulldogs
