= Darrian Beavers =

American football player (born 1999)

Profile
- Position: Linebacker

Personal information
- Born: July 5, 1999 (age 27); Cincinnati, Ohio, U.S.
- Listed height: 6 ft 4 in (1.93 m)
- Listed weight: 255 lb (116 kg)

Career information
- High school: Colerain (Cincinnati)
- College: UConn (2017–2018); Cincinnati (2019–2021)
- NFL draft: 2022: 6th round, 182nd overall pick

Career history
- New York Giants (2022–2023)

Awards and highlights
- First-team All-AAC (2021); Second-team All-AAC (2020)
- Stats at Pro Football Reference

Darrian Beavers (born July 5, 1999) is an American professional football linebacker. He played college football at UConn before transferring to Cincinnati.

== Early life ==
Beavers attended Colerain High School in Cincinnati, Ohio. He played wide receiver and safety in high school. He committed to the University of Connecticut to play college football.

== College career ==
Beavers played two years at Connecticut before transferring to the University of Cincinnati. In those two years he started six of 24 games, recording 38 tackles and seven sacks. He transferred to Cincinnati in 2019. In his first year at Cincinnati, Beavers started 10 of 14 games and had 36 tackles. In 2020, he started 10 games, recording 58 tackles, 2.5 sacks and two interceptions. He returned to Cincinnati as a starter in 2021. He was a finalist for the Dick Butkus Award.

== Professional career ==
Pre-draft measurables
Height	Weight	Arm length	Hand span	Wingspan	40-yard dash	10-yard split	20-yard split	20-yard shuttle	Three-cone drill	Vertical jump	Broad jump
6 ft 3 3/4 in (1.92 m)	237 lb (108 kg)	32 3/8 in (0.82 m)	9 3/4 in (0.25 m)	6 ft 8 5/8 in (2.05 m)	4.67 s	1.63 s	2.72 s	4.17 s	6.91 s	39.0 in (0.99 m)	10 ft 5 in (3.18 m)
All values from NFL Combine/Pro Day

Beavers was drafted by the New York Giants with the 182nd pick in the sixth round of the 2022 NFL draft. Beavers tore his ACL in week 2 of the preseason against the Cincinnati Bengals and was placed on injured reserve.

On August 29, 2023, Beavers was waived by the Giants and re-signed to the practice squad. He was promoted to the active roster on December 30.

Beavers was waived by the Giants on August 27, 2024.
