= Jack Dingle =

American football player (born 2003)

No. 48 – Green Bay Packers
- Position: Linebacker
- Roster status: Practice squad

Personal information
- Born: May 21, 2003 (age 23)
- Listed height: 6 ft 4 in (1.93 m)
- Listed weight: 232 lb (105 kg)

Career information
- High school: Trinity (St. Matthews, Kentucky)
- College: Cincinnati (2021–2025)
- NFL draft: 2026: undrafted

Career history
- Cincinnati Bengals (2026)*; Green Bay Packers (2026–present)*
- * Offseason or practice squad member only
- Stats at Pro Football Reference

Jack Dingle (born May 21, 2003) is an American football linebacker for the Green Bay Packers of the National Football League (NFL). He played college football for the Cincinnati Bearcats. Dingle signed with the Cincinnati Bengals as an undrafted free agent, but was waived during final roster cuts before the 2026 season began.

== Early life ==
Dingle attended Trinity High School in St. Matthews, Kentucky. He was rated as a three-star recruit by 247Sports and committed to play college football for the Cincinnati Bearcats.

== College career ==
In five years at Cincinnati from 2021 to 2025, Dingle totaled 165 tackles with nine and a half being for a loss, and four sacks in 48 games played. After the 2025 season, he declared for the NFL draft.

== Professional career ==
Pre-draft measurables
Height	Weight	Arm length	Hand span	Wingspan	40-yard dash	10-yard split	20-yard split	20-yard shuttle	Three-cone drill	Vertical jump	Broad jump	Bench press
6 ft 4 1/8 in (1.93 m)	232 lb (105 kg)	31 3/4 in (0.81 m)	9 1/4 in (0.23 m)	6 ft 4 in (1.93 m)	4.57 s	1.57 s	2.64 s	4.17 s	7.10 s	35.5 in (0.90 m)	10 ft 4 in (3.15 m)	23 reps
All values from Pro Day

=== Cincinnati Bengals ===
After going unselected in the 2026 NFL draft, Dingle signed with the Cincinnati Bengals as an undrafted free agent. On August 30, Dingle was waived by Cincinnati as a part of final roster cuts.

=== Green Bay Packers ===
On October 8, 2026, Dingle signed with the Green Bay Packers practice squad.

== Personal life ==
Dingle is the son of former NFL linebacker Nate Dingle.
