= Curtis Brooks =

American football player (born 1998)

Profile
- Position: Defensive tackle

Personal information
- Born: February 6, 1998 (age 28); Danville, Virginia, U.S.
- Listed height: 6 ft 2 in (1.88 m)
- Listed weight: 287 lb (130 kg)

Career information
- High school: George Washington (Danville)
- College: Cincinnati (2016–2021)
- NFL draft: 2022: 6th round, 216th overall pick

Career history
- Indianapolis Colts (2022)*; Tennessee Titans (2022)*; Washington Commanders (2023); St. Louis Battlehawks (2025)*
- * Offseason or practice squad member only

Awards and highlights
- First-team All-AAC (2021)
- Stats at Pro Football Reference

Curtis Brooks (born February 6, 1998) is an American professional football defensive tackle. He played college football for the Cincinnati Bearcats. He was selected in the 6th round of the 2022 NFL draft by the Indianapolis Colts.

== Professional career ==
Pre-draft measurables
Height	Weight	Arm length	Hand span	40-yard dash	10-yard split	20-yard split	20-yard shuttle	Three-cone drill	Vertical jump	Broad jump	Bench press
6 ft 2 in (1.88 m)	287 lb (130 kg)	31 7/8 in (0.81 m)	10 in (0.25 m)	4.90 s	1.74 s	2.88 s	4.44 s	7.40 s	35.5 in (0.90 m)	9 ft 5 in (2.87 m)	33 reps
All values from Pro Day

=== Indianapolis Colts ===
Brooks was selected by the Indianapolis Colts in the sixth round (216th overall) of the 2022 NFL draft. He was waived on August 30, 2022, and signed to the practice squad the next day. He was released on December 19, 2022.

=== Tennessee Titans ===
Brooks signed with the practice squad of the Tennessee Titans on January 4, 2023. On January 10, he signed a reserve/future contract with the team. Brooks was waived by the Titans on July 26.

=== Washington Commanders ===
On August 3, 2023, Brooks signed with the Washington Commanders. He was placed on injured reserve five days later.

=== St. Louis Battlehawks ===
On March 3, 2025, Brooks signed with the St. Louis Battlehawks of the United Football League (UFL). He was released on March 20, 2025.
