= Myjai Sanders =

American football player (born 1998)

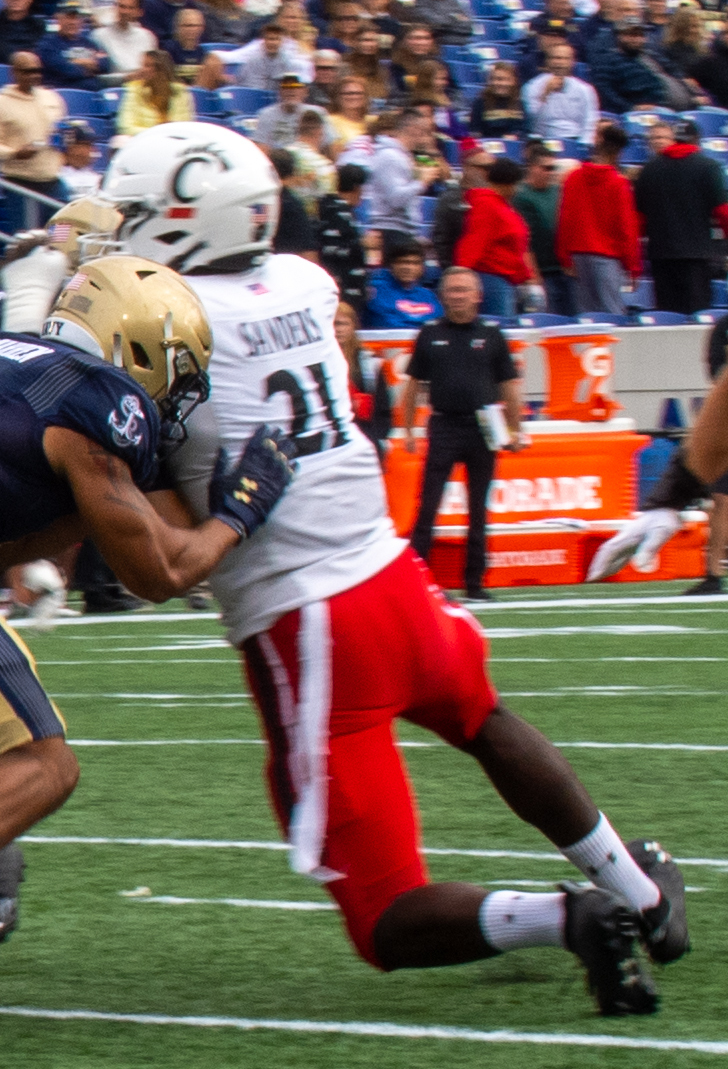
- Sanders with the Cincinnati Bearcats in 2021

Profile
- Position: Defensive end

Personal information
- Born: July 12, 1998 (age 28); Jacksonville, Florida, U.S.
- Listed height: 6 ft 5 in (1.96 m)
- Listed weight: 248 lb (112 kg)

Career information
- High school: Camden County (Kingsland, Georgia)
- College: Cincinnati (2018–2021)
- NFL draft: 2022: 3rd round, 100th overall pick

Career history
- Arizona Cardinals (2022–2023); Houston Texans (2023); Birmingham Stallions (2025)

Awards and highlights
- 2× First-team All-AAC (2020, 2021)

Career NFL statistics as of 2023
- Total tackles: 30
- Sacks: 3
- Forced fumbles: 1
- Fumble recoveries: 1
- Pass deflections: 3
- Stats at Pro Football Reference

Myjai Sanders (/ˈmaɪdʒeɪ/ MY-jay; born July 12, 1998) is an American professional football defensive end. He played college football for the Cincinnati Bearcats and was selected by the Arizona Cardinals in the third round of the 2022 NFL draft.

== Early life ==
Sanders grew up in Jacksonville, Florida, and attended William M. Raines High School before transferring to Camden County High School in Kingsland, Georgia before his junior year. He was named to the Coastal Georgia All-Area team by The Brunswick News after recording 39 tackles, three sacks and seven quarterback hurries as a senior. Sanders committed to play college football at Cincinnati over offers from Ole Miss, Mississippi State, Washington State, UCF.

== College career ==
Sanders played in ten games with seven tackles as a reserve in his freshman season. He was named a starter as a sophomore and finished the season with 40 tackles with seven tackles for loss and four sacks. Sanders was a named a semifinalist for the Chuck Bednarik Award as a junior. He was named the American Athletic Conference Defensive Player of the Week after recording six tackles with 1.5 sacks in a 49–10 win over Memphis.

== Professional career ==
Pre-draft measurables
Height	Weight	Arm length	Hand span	Wingspan	40-yard dash	10-yard split	20-yard split	20-yard shuttle	Vertical jump	Broad jump	Bench press
6 ft 5 1/4 in (1.96 m)	228 lb (103 kg)	32 5/8 in (0.83 m)	9 1/4 in (0.23 m)	6 ft 7 7/8 in (2.03 m)	4.67 s	1.57 s	2.68 s	4.37 s	33.0 in (0.84 m)	10 ft 0 in (3.05 m)	20 reps
All values from NFL Combine/Pro Day

=== Arizona Cardinals ===
Sanders was selected in the third round (100th overall) by the Arizona Cardinals in the 2022 NFL draft. On August 31, 2023, Sanders was placed on injured reserve. He was released on October 17.

=== Houston Texans ===
On October 18, 2023, Sanders was claimed off waivers by the Houston Texans. He was waived on April 9, 2024.

=== Birmingham Stallions ===
On December 30, 2024, Sanders signed with the Birmingham Stallions of the United Football League (UFL).

=== Louisville Kings ===
On January 13, 2026, Sanders was selected by the Louisville Kings in the 2026 UFL Draft. He was released on February 9.
