= 2020 Navy Midshipmen football team =

American college football season

2020 Navy Midshipmen football
- Conference: American Athletic Conference
- Record: 3–7 (3–4 AAC)
- Head coach: Ken Niumatalolo (13th season)
- Offensive coordinator: Ivin Jasper (13th season)
- Offensive scheme: Triple option
- Defensive coordinator: Brian Newberry (2nd season)
- Base defense: 4–2–5
- Captains: Billy Honaker; Cameron Kinley; Jackson Perkins
- Home stadium: Navy–Marine Corps Memorial Stadium

2020 American Athletic Conference football standings
	Conf.			Overall
Team	W		L	W		L
No. 8 Cincinnati y$	6	–	0	9	–	1
Tulsa y	6	–	0	6	–	3
Memphis	5	–	3	8	–	3
UCF	5	–	3	6	–	4
SMU	4	–	3	7	–	3
Houston	3	–	3	3	–	5
Navy	3	–	4	3	–	7
Tulane	3	–	5	6	–	6
East Carolina	3	–	5	3	–	6
Temple	1	–	6	1	–	6
South Florida	0	–	7	1	–	8
Championship: Cincinnati 27, Tulsa 24
$ – Conference champion; y – Championship game participant; Rankings from AP Poll.

The 2020 Navy Midshipmen football team represented the United States Naval Academy in the 2020 NCAA Division I FBS football season. The Midshipmen were led by thirteenth-year head coach Ken Niumatalolo and played their home games at Navy–Marine Corps Memorial Stadium. Navy competed as a member of the American Athletic Conference (AAC).

== Preseason ==
=== Award watch lists ===
Listed in the order that they were released

Award	Player	Position	Year
Chuck Bednarik Award	Diego Fagot	LB	JR
Doak Walker Award	Jamale Carothers	FB	SR
Bronko Nagurski Trophy	Diego Fagot	LB	JR
Wuerffel Trophy	Cameron Kinley	CB	SR

=== AAC preseason media poll ===
The preseason poll was released on September 1, 2020. The Midshipmen were predicted to finish in fifth place in the conference.

Media poll
Predicted finish	Team	Votes (1st place)
1	UCF	204 (10)
2	Cincinnati	201 (7)
3	Memphis	192 (2)
4	SMU	146
5	Navy	125 (1)
6	Tulane	118
7	Houston	114
8	Temple	88
9	Tulsa	49
10	East Carolina	42
11	South Florida	41

== Schedule ==
Navy had games scheduled against Lafayette and Notre Dame which were canceled due to the COVID-19 pandemic. The game against Notre Dame was originally scheduled to be played at Aviva Stadium in Dublin as the Emerald Isle Classic, but was rescheduled and moved back to the United States due to concerns regarding the COVID-19 pandemic. It was later canceled entirely when the Fighting Irish, playing as part of the ACC for the first time, chose Western Michigan as their one non-conference opponent for the season (which was itself canceled when the MAC canceled fall sports). The South Florida game, originally scheduled for November 21, was declared a no-contest following Covid issues with the Bulls' team.

Date	Time	Opponent	Site	TV	Result	Attendance
September 7	8:00 p.m.	BYU*	Navy–Marine Corps Memorial Stadium; Annapolis, MD	ESPN	L 3–55	0
September 19	12:00 p.m.	at Tulane	Yulman Stadium; New Orleans, LA	ABC	W 27–24	0
October 3	6:00 p.m.	at Air Force*	Falcon Stadium; Colorado Springs, CO (Commander-in-Chief's Trophy)	CBSSN	L 7–40	5,000
October 10	6:00 p.m.	Temple	Navy–Marine Corps Memorial Stadium; Annapolis, MD	CBSSN	W 31–29	4,400
October 17	12:00 p.m.	at East Carolina	Dowdy–Ficklen Stadium; Greenville, NC	ESPN2	W 27–23	3,500
October 24	3:30 p.m.	Houston^{†}	Navy–Marine Corps Memorial Stadium; Annapolis, MD	CBSSN	L 21–37	3,600
October 31	7:30 p.m.	at No. 22 SMU	Gerald J. Ford Stadium; University Park, TX (Gansz Trophy)	ESPN2	L 37–51	7,898
November 28	7:00 p.m.	Memphis	Navy–Marine Corps Memorial Stadium; Annapolis, MD	CBSSN	L 7–10	0
December 5	3:30 p.m.	No. 24 Tulsa	Navy–Marine Corps Memorial Stadium; Annapolis, MD	ESPN2	L 6–19	0
December 12	3:00 p.m.	at Army*	Michie Stadium; West Point, NY (Army–Navy Game, College GameDay)	CBS	L 0–15	12,722
*Non-conference game; ^{†}Homecoming; Rankings from AP Poll and CFP Rankings (after November 24) released prior to game; All times are in Eastern time

== Personnel ==
=== Coaching staff ===
Name	Position	Seasons at Navy	Alma mater
Ken Niumatalolo	Head coach	23 (13 as HC)	Hawaii (1989)
Offensive staff
Ivin Jasper	Offensive coordinator / quarterbacks coach	21	Hawaii (1994)
Joe DuPaix	Slotbacks coach	6	Southern Utah (1998)
Ashley Ingram	Running game coordinator / offensive centers and guards coach	13	North Alabama (1996)
Jason MacDonald	Fullbacks coach	2	Springfield College (MA) (2004)
Danny O'Rourke	Special teams coordinator / offensive tackles coach	19	West Georgia (1999)
Mick Yokitis	Wide receivers coach	10	Navy (2006)
Billy Ray Stutzmann	Offensive assistant coach	2	Hawaii (2013)
Defensive staff
Brian Newberry	Defensive coordinator / safeties coach	2	Baylor (1998)
James Adams	Cornerbacks coach	1	Wake Forest (2006)
Kevin Downing	Defensive ends / raiders coach	2	North Carolina Central (2004)
Robert Green	Defensive assistant coach	8	Navy (1998)
Steve Johns	Strikers coach	13	Occidental (1991)
Jerrick Hall	Nose guards / defensive tackles coach	2	NC State (2004)
P.J. Volker	Linebackers coach	2	Mount St. Joseph (2005)
Support staff
Brian Blick	Director of football operations	4	Navy (2012)
Va'a Niumatalolo	Assistant to the director of football operations	1	BYU (2018)
Bryan Fitzpatrick	Head football strength and conditioning / associate A.D. – sports performance	9	Towson (2005)
David Mahoney	Recruiting coordinator	4	Navy (2007)
Bryan Miller	Associate Football Strength and Conditioning / sports science coordinator	6	North Park
Omar Nelson	Director of player personnel	4	Navy (1997)
Capt. Ross Pospisil, USMC	Director of player development	2	Navy (2010)
Capt. Donald Bowers, USMC	Director of player development	1	Navy (2011)
Kevin Slattery	Director of football creative design	2	York College (PA) (2016)
Capt. Mike Walsh, USMC	Volunteer defensive analyst		Navy (2009)
Laura Webb	Administrative assistant to the head football coach		

=== Roster ===
The Navy football roster for the Week 1 game versus BYU (as of September 7, 2020):

2020 Navy Midshipmen roster
Quarterback: 1 Tai Lavatai, Freshman (6'2, 220); 2 Tyger Goslin, Junior (5'11, 181); 4 Matthew Peters, Freshman (6'2, 185); 6 John Meagher, Freshman (6'1, 190); 7 Xavier Arline, Freshman (5'9, 165); 8 Dalen Morris, Senior (6'1, 206); 9 Maasai Maynor, Sophomore (6'0, 192); 11 Perry Olsen, Sophomore (6'0, 205); 15 Jayden Umbarger, Freshman (6'0, 190); Slot Back: 13 Chance Warren, Junior (5'10, 190); 16 Vincent Terrell II, Freshman (5'8, 170); 20 CJ Williams, Senior (5'8, 175); 21 Zachary Kuhlman, Sophomore (6'1, 203); 22 Chike Otaluka, Junior (6'0, 195); 23 Myles Fells, Senior (5'11, 180); 24 Justin Smith, Senior (5'11, 197); 25 Carlinos Acie, Junior (5'9, 190); 26 Colby Jacques, Sophomore (5'8, 175); 28 Devon High, Junior (6'0, 205); 29 Daniel Jones, Freshman (5'9, 175); 31 Malcolm Terry II, Freshman (5'9, 186); 33 Kai Puailoa Rojas, Freshman (6'0, 182); 35 Mike Mauai, Sophomore (5'10, 186); Fullback: 32 Isaac Ruoss, Junior (6'1, 220); 34 Jamale Carothers, Junior (5'9, 203); 37 James Harris II, Junior (6'0, 230); 41 Brandon Madison, Sophomore (5'11, 223); 43 Nelson Smith, Senior (5'9, 213); Wide receiver: 3 Mychal Cooper, Junior (6'5, 221); 10 Camari Williams, Freshman (6'2, 205); 80 Mark Walker, Sophomore (6'2, 203); 81 Tyshawn Buckner, Sophomore (6'3, 199); 82 Emmett Davis, Senior (6'1, 184); 83 Marcell Gleaton, Junior (6'3, 224); 85 Michael Naze, Sophomore (6'3, 231); 86 Christian Hutchinson, Sophomore (6'4, 224); 87 Ryan Mitchell, Senior (6'3, 200); 88 Devin Mathews, Sophomore (6'4, 214); 89 Chase Parrish, Senior (5'11, 181); Punter: 18 Duke Paane, Freshman (6'4, 215); 39 Ben Fee, Junior (5'10, 231); Kicker: 5 Kevin Thibodeaux, Freshman (5'9, 160); 43 Bijan Nichols, Sophomore (6'1, 204); 45 Evan Warren, Freshman (5'10, 160); 47 Daniel Davies, Freshman (5'10, 173)	Offensive lineman: 50 Ahmad Bradley, Freshman (6'3, 300); 52 Wyatt Terlaak, Freshman (6'4, 325); 53 Drew Wilder, Freshman (6'3, 285); 54 Lirion Murtezi, Freshman (6'3, 300); 55 Sam Glover, Freshman (6'3, 265); 56 Joshua Pena, Freshman (6'2, 275); 58 Darrellson Masaniai, Freshman (6'2, 279); 60 Mattie Conlon, Junior (6'2, 290); 61 Jamie Romo, Sophomore (6'5, 285); 62 Pierce Banbury, Junior (6'2, 302); 63 Nicolas Rowan, Sophomore (6'1, 297); 64 Kurt Stengel, Senior (6'4, 256); 65 Nick Bernacchi, Junior (6'2, 290); 66 Kip Frankland, Sophomore (6'1, 280); 67 Bryce Texeira, Junior (6'2, 297); 69 Nick Dell'Acqua, Junior (6'4, 299); 70 Jackson Lee Mitchell, Junior (6'4, 267); 71 Billy Honaker, Senior (6'3, 282); 72 Luca Fratianne, Junior (6'2, 273); 73 Peter Nestrowitz, Senior (6'3, 282); 74 Jake Cossavella, Sophomore (6'4, 258); 75 Sean Rattay, Senior (6'1, 284); 76 Brandon Moore, Sophomore (6'1, 299); 77 Luke Coleman, Sophomore (6'4, 294); 78 Joseph Petti, Sophomore (6'6, 295); 79 Justin Self, Senior (6'2, 268); Defensive lineman: 58 Jacob Gregory, Senior (6'3, 234); 60 Ari Rodriguez, Freshman (6'1, 284); 61 Quinzy Salu, Sophomore (6'3, 255); 62 Jacob Busic, Freshman (6'4, 250); 64 Max Meeuwsen, Freshman (6'1, 235); 65 Brody Stephens, Freshman (6'4, 305); 66 Mike Petrof, Freshman (6'2, 283); 67 Donald Berniard Jr., Freshman (6'0, 280); 75 Jacob Greenwood, Freshman (6'2, 255); 76 Clay Cromwell, Freshman (6'3, 250); 77 Dalton Boswell, Freshman (6'3, 310); 78 Jacobi Rice, Sophomore (6'3, 270); 79 Pryson Greer, Freshman (6'1, 280); 90 Chris Pearson, Senior (6'3, 317); 91 John Brand, Sophomore (6'3, 270); 92 Deondrae Williams, Junior (6'0, 266); 93 Dexter Manior, Sophomore (6'3, 283); 94 J'arius Warren, Junior (6'1, 257); 95 Tobe Okafor, Senior (6'4, 295); 96 Jackson Perkins, Senior (6'6, 257); 97 Antonio Greer, Sophomore (6'2, 250); 98 Mike Flowers, Senior (6'3, 318); 99 Alefosio Saipaia, Sophomore (6'0, 291); Raider: 42 Ian Blake, Senior (6'2, 226); 44 Cal Long, Junior (6'2, 230); 46 Tommy Lawley, Junior (6'2, 219); 53 John Amell, Sophomore (6'3, 230); 55 John Kelly III, Junior (6'2, 232); 56 Max Sandlin, Sophomore (6'4, 220); 70 Jackson Boyer, Freshman (6'4, 215); 71 Tausili Fiatoa, Freshman (6'3, 230); 72 Akalea Kapono, Freshman (6'1, 215); 73 Keandre' Harper, Freshman (6'3, 220); 74 Andrew Keating, Freshman (6'2, 210)	Linebacker: 34 Aaron Davis, Freshman (6'2, 202); 37 Chaisen Buckner, Freshman (6'1, 197); 38 Michael Salisbury, Junior (6'2, 200); 40 Gavin Marts, Sophomore (6'0, 228); 41 Terrell Adams, Sophomore (6'0, 215); 45 Tama Tuitele, Sophomore (6'1, 249); 47 Colton Higgins, Sophomore (6'1, 201); 49 Trent Shiraki, Sophomore (6'0, 215); 50 Khalil Crawford, Freshman (6'1, 220); 51 Nicholas Straw, Sophomore (6'2, 230); 52 Mitchell Johns, Junior (6'1, 224); 54 Diego Fagot, Junior (6'3, 240); 57 Johnny Hodges, Sophomore (6'2, 210); 59 Tysean White, Sophomore (6'3, 225); 86 Will Harbour, Freshman (6'1, 225); 87 Dean Neeley, Freshman (6'0, 205); Bandit: 6 Mitchell West, Junior (5'10, 192); 7 Kevin Brennan, Junior (5'11, 199); 10 BJ Gibson, Sophomore (6'4, 209); 13 Mike Cabrera, Senior (5'10, 198); 15 Taylor Robinson, Sophomore (6'0, 182); 22 Adrion Taylor, Sophomore (5'9, 195); Striker: 31 Austin Talbert–Loving, Senior (6'0, 210); 33 Vincent Thomas Jr., Sophomore (5'10, 200); 48 Joshua Adams, Sophomore (6'0, 198); 80 Ajani Cuevas-Gillis, Freshman (6'0, 170); 82 Xavier McDonald, Freshman (5'11, 190); Cornerback: 2 Marcus Wiggins, Senior (6'4, 188); 3 Cameron Kinley, Senior (6'2, 204); 4 David Miller, Sophomore (5'9, 192); 5 Michael McMorris, Junior (5'9, 166); 9 Daniel Taylor, Junior (5'10, 180); 14 Micah Farrar, Senior (6'0, 180); 15 Tyler Rogers, Junior (5'10, 184); 16 Jamal Glenn, Junior (5'11, 181); 17 Ebissa Sambo, Sophomore (5'10, 169); 18 Dre Grace, Freshman (6'0, 165); 23 Brandon Willis, Sophomore (5'10, 189); 24 Romaine Robinson, Freshman (5'9, 175); 25 Jordan Geter, Sophomore (5'10, 174); 29 Caleb Clear, Senior (6'1, 188); Safety: 1 John Marshall, Sophomore (6'2, 197); 8 Willie Collins V, Freshman (5'11, 185); 11 Evan Fochtman, Senior (6'1, 293); 20 Kamron Love, Freshman (5'11, 170); 21 Colin O'Connor, Freshman (6'1, 170); 26 Eavan Gibbons, Freshman (5'10, 185); 36 Derek Atwaters, Sophomore (6'1, 193); 39 Marcus Moore, Freshman (6'0, 180); Long snapper: 44 Cole Williams, Freshman (6'0, 220); 49 Kyle Gibbs, Senior (6'2, 206)

== Game summaries ==
=== BYU ===
BYU Cougars at Navy Midshipmen

Quarter	1	2	3	4	Total
Cougars	14	17	17	7	55
Midshipmen	0	0	3	0	3

at Navy-Marine Corps Memorial Stadium, Annapolis, MD

- Date: September 7, 2020
- Game time: 8:00 p.m. EDT
- Game weather: Temperature: 75 °F (24 °C) • Wind: S 5 mph • Weather: Clear
- Game attendance: 0
- Referee: Kevin Mar
- TV announcers (ESPN): Rece Davis (play-by-play), Kirk Herbstreit (analyst), & Allison Williams (sideline)
- ESPN – BYU rolls past Navy 55–3 in season-opener with no fans /// Box Score, BYU at Navy /// Pregame Notes /// Postgame Notes

Game information

First quarter

- (10:07) BYU TD – Tyler Allgeier 34-yard rush, Jake Oldroyd kick
  Drive: 7 plays, 74 yards, 2:49; BYU 7–0
- (07:16) BYU TD – Lopini Katoa 39-yard rush, Jake Oldroyd kick
  Drive: 3 plays, 52 yards, 1:27; BYU 14–0

Second quarter

- (13:31) BYU TD – Lopini Katoa 15-yard pass from Zach Wilson, Jake Oldroyd kick
  Drive: 8 plays, 89 yards, 4:14; BYU 21–0
- (05:00) BYU FG – Jake Oldroyd 22-yard field goal
  Drive: 11 plays, 43 yards, 6:36; BYU 24–0)
- (00:08) BYU TD – Lopini Katoa 1-yard rush, Jake Oldroyd kick
  Drive: 10 plays, 56 yards, 2:35; BYU 31–0

Third quarter

- (13:05) BYU TD – Gunner Romney 45-yard pass from Zach Wilson, Jake Oldroyd kick
  Drive: 4 plays, 83 yards, 1:55; BYU 38–0
- (07:10) BYU TD – Tyler Allgeier 17-yard rush, Jake Oldroyd kick
  Drive: 4 plays, 80 yards, 2:05; BYU 45–0
- (03:09) BYU FG – Jake Oldroyd 34-yard field goal
  Drive: 7 plays, 33 yards, 3:06; BYU 48–0
- (00:54) NAVY FG – Bijan Nichols 48-yard field goal
  Drive: 6 plays, 44 yards, 2:15; BYU 48–3

Fourth quarter

- 07:26) BYU TD – Jack McChesney 9-yard rush, Jake Oldroyd kick
  Drive: 6 plays, 43 yards, 3:49; BYU 55–3

Statistics	BYU	NAVY
First downs	28	7
Plays–yards	71–580	47–149
Rushes–yards	49–301	39–119
Passing yards	279	30
Passing: comp–att–int	16–22–1	4–8–0
Turnovers		
Time of possession	37:20	22:40

Team	Category	Player	Statistics
BYU	Passing	Zach Wilson	13/18, 232 yards, 2 TD, 1 INT
BYU	Rushing	Tyler Allgeier	14 carries, 132 yards, 2 TD
BYU	Receiving	Gunner Romney	4 receptions, 134 yards, 1 TD
NAVY	Passing	Dalen Morris	2/4, 16 yards
NAVY	Rushing	Myles Fells	3 carries, 55 yards
NAVY	Receiving	Mark Walker	2 receptions, 20 yards

=== At Tulane ===
Navy Midshipmen at Tulane Green Wave

Quarter	1	2	3	4	Total
Midshipmen	0	0	16	11	27
Green Wave	10	14	0	0	24

at Yulman Stadium, New Orleans, LA

- Date: September 19, 2020
- Game time: 11:00 a.m. CDT
- Game weather: Temperature: 72 °F (22 °C) • Wind: NE 16 mph • Weather: Rain
- Game attendance: 0
- Referee: Hank Johns
- TV announcers (ABC): Mark Jones (play-by-play), Dusty Dvoracek (analyst), & Quint Kessenich (sideline)
- ESPN – Navy erases 24-point deficit, stuns Tulane 27–24 /// Box Score, Navy at Tulane /// Pregame Notes /// Postgame Notes

Game information

First Quarter

- (09:59) TLN TD – Cameron Carroll 3-yard rush, Merek Glover kick
  Drive: 5 plays, 66 yards, 1:49; Tulane 7–0
- (02:04) TLN FG – Merek Glover 22-yard field goal
  Drive: 14 plays, 54 yards, 5:55; Tulane 10–0

Second Quarter

- (11:43) TLN TD – Phat Watts 3-yard rush, Merek Glover kick
  Drive: 11 plays, 63 yards, 3:31; Tulane 17–0
- (03:03) TLN TD – Cameron Carroll 24-yard rush, Merek Glover kick
  Drive: 7 plays, 93 yards, 3:01; Tulane 24–0

Third Quarter

- (06:43) NAVY TD – Nelson Smith 1-yard rush, Bijan Nichols kick
  Drive: 3 plays, 69 yards, 0:53; Tulane 24–7
- (02:46) NAVY TD – Nelson Smith 1-yard rush, Bijan Nichols kick
  Drive: 6 plays, 61 yards, 2:23; Tulane 24–14
- (00:32) NAVY SF – Evan Fochtman safety
  Drive: 0 plays, 0 yards, 0:00; Tulane 24–16

Fourth Quarter

- (13:22) NAVY TD – Mychal Cooper 32-yard pass from Dalen Morris, Devin Mathews pass
  Drive: 6 plays, 57 yards, 2:01; Tied 24–24
- (00:00) NAVY FG – Bijan Nichols 33-yard field goal
  Drive: 10 plays, 52 yards, 4:41; Navy 27–24

Statistics	NAVY	TLN
First downs	17	18
Plays–yards	68–350	69–373
Rushes–yards	56–204	44–265
Passing yards	146	108
Passing: comp–att–int	7–12–0	10–25–1
Turnovers		
Time of possession	32:35	27:25

Team	Category	Player	Statistics
NAVY	Passing	Dalen Morris	6/11, 139 yards, 1 TD
NAVY	Rushing	Jamale Carothers	25 carries, 127 yards
NAVY	Receiving	Mychal Cooper	3 receptions, 71 yards, 1 TD
TLN	Passing	Keon Howard	10/25, 108 yards, 1 INT
TLN	Rushing	Tyjae Spears	18 carries, 119 yards
TLN	Receiving	Tyrick James	2 receptions, 38 yards

=== At Air Force ===
Navy Midshipmen at Air Force Falcons

Quarter	1	2	3	4	Total
Midshipmen	0	7	0	0	7
Falcons	3	13	3	21	40

at Falcon Stadium, Colorado Springs, CO

- Date: October 3, 2020
- Game time: 4:00 p.m. MDT
- Game weather: Temperature: 64 °F (18 °C) • Wind: SSE 8 mph • Weather: Sunny
- Game attendance: 5,000
- Referee: Luke Richmond
- TV announcers (CBSSN): Carter Blackburn (play-by-play), Aaron Taylor (analyst), & Jenny Dell (sideline)
- ESPN – Air Force kicker, defense pave way to 40–7 win over Navy /// Box Score, Navy at Air Force /// Pregame Notes /// Postgame Notes

Game information

First Quarter

- (07:44) AF FG – Tevye Schuettpelz-Rohl 48-yard field goal
  Drive: 7 plays, 35 yards, 3:49; Air Force 3–0

Second Quarter

- (14:50) NAVY TD – Myles Fells 73-yard pass from Tyger Goslin, Bijan Nichols kick
  Drive: 2 plays, 75 yards, 0:13; Navy 7–3
- (10:58) AF TD – Haaziq Daniels 1-yard rush, Tevye Schuettpelz-Rohl kick
  Drive: 8 plays, 75 yards, 3:52; Air Force 10–7
- (06:36) AF FG – Tevye Schuettpelz-Rohl 35-yard field goal
  Drive: 5 plays, 12 yards, 2:01; Air Force 13–7
- (00:00) AF FG – Tevye Schuettpelz-Rohl 32-yard field goal
  Drive: 12 plays, 66 yards, 4:28; Air Force 16–7

Third Quarter

- (11:45) AF FG – Tevye Schuettpelz-Rohl 40-yard field goal
  Drive: 6 plays, 52 yards, 3:15; Air Force 19–7

Fourth Quarter

- (12:08) AF TD – Matthew Murla 2-yard rush, Tevye Schuettpelz-Rohl kick
  Drive: 7 plays, 74 yards, 3:28; Air Force 26–7
- (09:14) AF TD – Brad Roberts 2-yard rush, Tevye Schuettpelz-Rohl kick
  Drive: 4 plays, 29 yards, 2:12; Air Force 33–7
- (03:50) AF TD – Warren Bryan 1-yard rush, Anthony Rodriguez kick
  Drive: 5 plays, 38 yards, 2:40; Air Force 40–7

Statistics	NAVY	AF
First downs	10	25
Plays–yards	54–241	62–410
Rushes–yards	36–90	53–369
Passing yards	151	41
Passing: comp–att–int	8–18–1	4–9–0
Turnovers		
Time of possession	25:52	34:08

Team	Category	Player	Statistics
NAVY	Passing	Tyger Goslin	6/15, 137 yards, 1 TD
NAVY	Rushing	Nelson Smith	7 carries, 25 yards
NAVY	Receiving	Myles Fells	1 reception, 73 yards, 1 TD
AF	Passing	Haaziq Daniels	4/9, 41 yards
AF	Rushing	Timothy Jackson	19 carries, 118 yards
AF	Receiving	Daniel Morris	3 receptions, 29 yards

=== Temple ===
Temple Owls at Navy Midshipmen

Quarter	1	2	3	4	Total
Owls	0	10	7	12	29
Midshipmen	7	14	7	3	31

at Navy-Marine Corps Memorial Stadium, Annapolis, MD

- Date: October 10, 2020
- Game time: 6:00 p.m. EDT
- Game weather: Temperature: 71 °F (22 °C) • Wind: S 5–10 mph • Weather: Overcast, Slight Wind
- Game attendance: 4,400
- Referee: Tim Rich
- TV announcers (CBSSN): John Sadak (play-by-play), Randy Cross (analyst), & Sheehan Stanwick-Burch (sideline)
- ESPN – Temple Owls at Navy Midshipmen /// Box Score, Temple at Navy /// Pregame Notes /// Postgame Notes

Game information

First Quarter

- (05:22) NAVY TD – Jamale Carothers 1-yard rush, Bijan Nichols kick
  Drive: 17 plays, 75 yards, 9:38; Navy 7–0

Second Quarter

- (14:23) TEM FG – Will Mobley 25-yard field goal
  Drive: 15 plays, 75 yards, 5:59; Navy 7–3
- (10:18) NAVY TD – Chance Warren 2-yard rush, Bijan Nichols kick
  Drive: 8 plays, 57 yards, 4:05; Navy 14–3
- (07:54) TEM TD – Anthony Russo 1-yard rush, Will Mobley kick
  Drive: 8 plays, 78 yards, 2:24; Navy 14–10
- (03:46) NAVY TD – Nelson Smith 26-yard rush, Bijan Nichols kick
  Drive: 8 plays, 65 yards, 4:08; Navy 21–10

Third Quarter

- (05:43) TEM TD – Branden Mack 7-yard pass from Anthony Russo, Will Mobley kick
  Drive: 10 plays, 70 yards, 4:44; Navy 21–17
- (01:09) NAVY TD – Nelson Smith 22-yard rush, Bijan Nichols kick
  Drive: 9 plays, 75 yards, 4:34; Navy 28–17

Fourth Quarter

- (14:02) TEM TD – Anthony Russo 9-yard rush, Anthony Russo pass failed
  Drive: 6 plays, 75 yards, 2:07; Navy 28–23
- (04:56) NAVY FG – Bijan Nichols 50-yard field goal
  Drive: 15 plays, 26 yards, 9:06; Navy 31–23
- (01:02) TEM TD – Re'Mahn Davis 1-yard rush, Anthony Russo pass failed
  Drive: 10 plays, 75 yards, 3:54; Navy 31–29

Statistics	TEM	NAVY
First downs	25	18
Plays–yards	64–407	62–299
Rushes–yards	33–166	60–251
Passing yards	241	48
Passing: comp–att–int	22–31–1	2–2–0
Turnovers		
Time of possession	24:39	35:21

Team	Category	Player	Statistics
TEM	Passing	Anthony Russo	21/30, 206 yards, 1 TD, 1 INT
TEM	Rushing	Re'Mahn Davis	23 carries, 97 yards, 1 TD
TEM	Receiving	Branden Mack	7 receptions, 80 yards, 1 TD
NAVY	Passing	Dalen Morris	2/2, 48 yards
NAVY	Rushing	Nelson Smith	20 carries, 120 yards, 2 TD
NAVY	Receiving	CJ Williams	1 reception, 36 yards

With this victory, Navy Coach Ken Niumatalolo achieved his 100th win, becoming the 6th active head coach at the FBS level to win 100 games at one school.

=== At East Carolina ===
Navy Midshipmen at East Carolina Pirates

Quarter	1	2	3	4	Total
Midshipmen	7	6	14	0	27
Pirates	6	7	0	10	23

at Dowdy–Ficklen Stadium, Greenville, NC

- Date: October 17, 2020
- Game time: 12:00 p.m. EDT
- Game weather: Temperature: 61 °F (16 °C) • Wind: NNE 10 mph • Weather: Mostly Sunny
- Game attendance: 3,500
- Referee: Edwin Lee
- TV announcers (ESPN2): Lincoln Rose (play-by-play) & Keith Moreland (analyst)
- ESPN – Navy Midshipmen at East Carolina Pirates /// Box Score, Navy at Air Force /// Pregame Notes /// Postgame Notes

Game information

First Quarter

- (08:21) NAVY TD – Nelson Smith 20-yard rush, Bijan Nichols kick
  Drive: 6 plays, 50 yards, 3:06; Navy 7–0
- (04:44) ECU FG – Jake Verity 40-yard field goal
  Drive: 10 plays, 52 yards, 3:37; Navy 7–3
- (02:23) ECU FG – Jake Verity 25-yard field goal
  Drive: 5 plays, 17 yards, 1:47; Navy 7–6

Second Quarter

- (07:03) ECU TD – Mason Garcia 3-yard rush, Jake Verity kick
  Drive: 8 plays, 44 yards, 3:07; East Carolina 13–7
- (03:48) NAVY TD – Dalen Morris 9-yard rush, Bijan Nichols kick failed
  Drive: 7 plays, 75 yards, 3:15; Tied 13–13

Third Quarter

- (08:51) NAVY TD – Nelson Smith 29-yard rush, Bijan Nichols kick
  Drive: 3 plays, 59 yards, 1:21; Navy 20–13
- (00:00) NAVY TD – Jamale Carothers 3-yard rush, Bijan Nichols kick
  Drive: 12 plays, 50 yards, 5:37; Navy 27–13

Fourth Quarter

- (14:15) ECU TD – Rahjai Harris 80-yard rush, Jake Verity kick
  Drive: 2 plays, 84 yards, 0:45; Navy 27–20
- (06:33) ECU FG – Jake Verity 39-yard field goal
  Drive: 12 plays, 45 yards, 5:54; Navy 27–23

Statistics	NAVY	ECU
First downs	17	19
Plays–yards	62–318	65–372
Rushes–yards	57–288	45–268
Passing yards	30	104
Passing: comp–att–int	3–5–1	10–20–0
Turnovers		
Time of possession	31:29	28:31

Team	Category	Player	Statistics
NAVY	Passing	Dalen Morris	3/4, 30 yards, 1 INT
NAVY	Rushing	Nelson Smith	17 carries, 157 yards, 2 TD
NAVY	Receiving	Jamale Carothers	1 reception, 14 yards
ECU	Passing	Mason Garcia	10/20, 104 yards
ECU	Rushing	Rahjai Harris	22 carries, 172 yards, 1 TD
ECU	Receiving	Tyler Snead	4 receptions, 39 yards

=== Houston ===
Houston Cougars at Navy Midshipmen

Quarter	1	2	3	4	Total
Cougars	3	13	7	14	37
Midshipmen	7	6	0	8	21

at Navy-Marine Corps Memorial Stadium, Annapolis, MD

- Date: October 24, 2020
- Game time: 3:30 p.m. EDT
- Game weather: Temperature: 74 °F (23 °C) • Wind: NW 5–10 mph • Weather: Sunny, Few Clouds
- Game attendance: 3,600
- Referee: Hank Johns
- TV announcers (CBSSN): John Sadak (play-by-play), Randy Cross (analyst), & Sheehan Stanwick-Burch (sideline)
- ESPN – Houston Cougars at Navy Midshipmen /// Box Score, Houston at Navy /// Pregame Notes /// Postgame Notes

Game information

First Quarter

- (06:04) HOU FG – Dalton Witherspoon 33-yard field goal
  Drive: 13 plays, 33 yards, 4:31; Houston 3–0
- (00:08) NAVY TD – Dalen Morris 6-yard rush, Bijan Nichols kick
  Drive: 11 plays, 75 yards, 5:56; Navy 7–6

Second Quarter

- (10:47) HOU FG – Dalton Witherspoon 53-yard field goal
  Drive: 11 plays, 39 yards, 4:21; Navy 7–6
- (06:37) HOU FG – Dalton Witherspoon 45-yard field goal
  Drive: 5 plays, 22 yards, 2:39; Houston 9–7
- (04:02) NAVY TD – Ryan Mitchell 60-yard pass from Dalen Morris, Bijan Nichols kick blocked
  Drive: 6 plays, 75 yards, 2:35; Navy 13–9
- (01:53) HOU TD – Marquez Stevenson 51-yard pass from Clayton Tune, Dalton Witherspoon kick
  Drive: 3 plays, 79 yards, 0:44; Houston 16–13

Third Quarter

- (06:32) HOU TD – Kyle Porter 1-yard rush, Dalton Witherspoon kick
  Drive: 5 plays, 20 yards, 2:27; Houston 23–13

Fourth Quarter

- (14:06) HOU TD – Kyle Porter 33-yard pass from Clayton Tune, Dalton Witherspoon kick
  Drive: 10 plays, 77 yards, 3:46; Houston 30–13
- (05:24) HOU TD – Marquez Stevenson 24-yard pass from Clayton Tune, Dalton Witherspoon kick
  Drive: 12 plays, 80 yards, 5:08; Houston 37–13
- (01:07) NAVY TD – CJ Williams 5-yard pass from Dalen Morris, Dalen Morris rush
  Drive: 14 plays, 75 yards, 4:17; Houston 37–21

Statistics	HOU	NAVY
First downs	23	16
Plays–yards	68–420	68–372
Rushes–yards	31–86	50–166
Passing yards	334	206
Passing: comp–att–int	26–37–0	10–18–1
Turnovers		
Time of possession	29:11	30:49

Team	Category	Player	Statistics
HOU	Passing	Clayton Tune	24/34, 316 yards, 3 TD
HOU	Rushing	Kyle Porter	21 carries, 52 yards, 1 TD
HOU	Receiving	Marquez Stevenson	9 receptions, 129 yards, 2 TD
NAVY	Passing	Dalen Morris	10/18, 206 yards, 2 TD, 1 INT
NAVY	Rushing	Nelson Smith	11 carries, 51 yards
NAVY	Receiving	Ryan Mitchell	2 receptions, 94 yards, 1 TD

=== At SMU ===
Navy Midshipmen at No. 22 SMU Mustangs

Quarter	1	2	3	4	Total
Midshipmen	7	10	0	20	37
No. 22 Mustangs	0	31	14	6	51

at Gerald J. Ford Stadium, Dallas, TX

- Date: October 31, 2020
- Game time: 6:30 p.m. CDT
- Game weather: Temperature: 66 °F (19 °C) • Wind: SSE 7 mph • Weather: Partly Cloudy
- Game attendance: 7,898
- Referee: Edwin Lee
- TV announcers (ESPN2): Anish Shroff (play-by-play), Tom Luginbill (analyst), & Ian Fitzsimmons (sideline)
- ESPN – Navy Midshipmen at No. 22 SMU Mustangs /// Box Score, Navy at No. 22 SMU /// Pregame Notes /// Postgame Notes

Game information

First Quarter

- (05:19) NAVY TD – Nelson Smith 3-yard rush, Bijan Nichols kick
  Drive: 13 plays, 76 yards, 6:38; Navy 7–0

Second Quarter

- (14:52) SMU TD – Ulysses Bentley IV 4-yard rush, Chris Naggar kick
  Drive: 12 plays, 82 yards, 5:19; Tied 7–7
- (12:25) NAVY TD – Chance Warren 7-yard rush, Bijan Nichols kick
  Drive: 6 plays, 75 yards, 2:27; Navy 14–7
- (09:48) SMU TD – Ulysses Bentley IV 18-yard rush, Chris Naggar kick
  Drive: 6 plays, 71 yards, 2:32; Tied 14–14
- (07:35) SMU TD – Tyler Lavine 10-yard rush, Chris Naggar kick
  Drive: 5 plays, 57 yards, 1:10; SMU 21–14
- (01:18) NAVY FG – Bijan Nichols 46-yard field goal
  Drive: 10 plays, 46 yards, 6:17; SMU 21–17
- (00:07) SMU TD – Rashee Rice 5-yard pass from Shane Buechele, Chris Naggar kick
  Drive: 10 plays, 71 yards, 1:07; SMU 28–17
- (00:00) SMU FG – Chris Naggar 35-yard field goal
  Drive: 1 play, 0 yards, 0:01; SMU 31–17

Third Quarter

- (10:32) SMU TD – Austin Upshaw 42-yard pass from Shane Buechele, Chris Naggar kick
  Drive: 6 plays, 80 yards, 1:54; SMU 38–17
- (05:17) SMU TD – Rashee Rice 20-yard pass from Shane Buechele, Chris Naggar kick
  Drive: 5 plays, 86 yards, 2:03; SMU 45–17

Fourth Quarter

- (14:44) SMU TD – Tyler Lavine 48-yard rush, Chris Naggar kick blocked
  Drive: 5 plays, 78 yards, 2:10; SMU 51–17
- (12:37) NAVY TD – Jamale Carothers 62-yard pass from Tyger Goslin, Tyger Goslin rush failed
  Drive: 4 plays, 77 yards, 1:29; SMU 51–23
- (08:17) NAVY TD – Chance Warren 19-yard rush, Bijan Nichols kick
  Drive: 7 plays, 47 yards, 2:34; SMU 51–30
- (02:39) NAVY TD – Mychal Cooper 14-yard pass from Tyger Goslin, Bijan Nichols kick
  Drive: 11 plays, 90 yards, 4:06; SMU 51–37

Statistics	NAVY	SMU
First downs	27	25
Plays–yards	75–430	65–555
Rushes–yards	45–191	37–255
Passing yards	239	300
Passing: comp–att–int	14–30–0	23–28–0
Turnovers		
Time of possession	34:27	25:33

Team	Category	Player	Statistics
NAVY	Passing	Tyler Goslin	6/10, 123 yards, 2 TD
NAVY	Rushing	CJ Williams	5 carries, 63 yards
NAVY	Receiving	Jamale Carothers	2 receptions, 91 yards, 1 TD
SMU	Passing	Shane Buechele	23/28, 300 yards, 3 TD
SMU	Rushing	Ulysses Bentley IV	25 carries, 149 yards, 2 TD
SMU	Receiving	Ulysses Bentley IV	4 receptions, 68 yards

=== Memphis ===
Memphis Tigers at Navy Midshipmen

Quarter	1	2	3	4	Total
Tigers	7	0	0	3	10
Midshipmen	7	0	0	0	7

at Navy-Marine Corps Memorial Stadium, Annapolis, MD

- Date: November 28, 2020
- Game time: 7:00 p.m. EST
- Game weather: Temperature: 53 °F (12 °C) • Wind: Min. N • Weather: Clear Fall Night
- Game attendance: 0
- Referee: Luke Richmond
- TV announcers (CBSSN): John Sadak (play-by-play), Randy Cross (analyst), & Tina Cervasio (sideline)
- ESPN – Memphis Tigers at Navy Midshipmen Preview /// Box Score, Memphis at Navy /// Pregame Notes /// Postgame Notes

Game information

First Quarter

- (06:07) NAVY TD – Nelson Smith 22-yard rush, Bijan Nichols kick
  Drive: 8 plays, 83 yards, 4:00; Navy 7–0
- (03:52) MEM TD – Calvin Austin III 14-yard pass from Brady White, Riley Patterson kick
  Drive: 6 plays, 79 yards, 2:15; Tied 7–7

Second Quarter

No scoring

Third Quarter

No scoring

Fourth Quarter

- (10:53) MEM FG – Riley Patterson 26-yard field goal
  Drive: 9 plays, 46 yards, 4:01; Memphis 10–7

Statistics	MEM	NAVY
First downs	12	14
Plays–yards	58–280	65–321
Rushes–yards	26–75	52–233
Passing yards	205	88
Passing: comp–att–int	18–32–0	4–13–1
Turnovers		
Time of possession	26:02	33:58

Team	Category	Player	Statistics
MEM	Passing	Brady White	18/32, 205 yards, 1 TD
MEM	Rushing	Marquavius Weaver	15 carries, 49 yards
MEM	Receiving	Tahj Washington	4 receptions, 68 yards
NAVY	Passing	Tyger Goslin	3/9, 73 yards, 1 INT
NAVY	Rushing	Nelson Smith	29 carries, 142 yards, 1 TD
NAVY	Receiving	Chance Warren	1 reception, 41 yards

=== Tulsa ===
No. 24 Tulsa Golden Hurricane at Navy Midshipmen

Quarter	1	2	3	4	Total
No. 24 Golden Hurricane	0	6	7	6	19
Midshipmen	0	3	3	0	6

at Navy-Marine Corps Memorial Stadium, Annapolis, MD

- Date: December 5, 2020
- Game time: 3:30 p.m. EST
- Game weather: Temperature: 48 °F (9 °C) • Wind: NW 15–20 mph • Weather: Overcast, Breezy
- Game attendance: 0
- Referee: Henry Johns
- TV announcers (ESPN2): Anish Shroff (play-by-play), Tom Luginbill (analyst), & Alex Chappell (sideline)
- ESPN – No. 24 Tulsa Golden Hurricane at Navy Midshipmen /// Box Score, No. 24 Tulsa at Navy /// Pregame Notes /// Postgame Notes

Game information

First Quarter

No scoring

Second Quarter

- (11:58) TLS FG – Zack Long 48-yard field goal
  Drive: 7 plays, 14 yards, 2:14; Tulsa 3–0
- (03:22) TLS FG – Zack Long 25-yard field goal
  Drive: 6 plays, 17 yards, 2:05; Tulsa 6–0
- (00:00) NAVY FG – Bijan Nichols 34-yard field goal
  Drive: 13 plays, 57 yards, 3:22; Tulsa 6–3

Third Quarter

- (07:08) NAVY FG – Bijan Nichols 32-yard field goal
  Drive: 14 plays, 60 yards, 7:52; Tied 6–6
- (01:33) TLS TD – Josh Johnson 66-yard pass from Zach Smith, Zack Long kick
  Drive: 3 plays, 63 yards, 1:36; Tulsa 13–6

Fourth Quarter

- (10:58) TLS FG – Zack Long 37-yard field goal
  Drive: 11 plays, 52 yards, 4:02; Tulsa 16–6
- (02:54) TLS FG – Zack Long 36-yard field goal
  Drive: 10 plays, 55 yards, 2:48; Tulsa 19–6

Statistics	TLS	NAVY
First downs	15	13
Plays–yards	68–296	64–153
Rushes–yards	43–128	53–126
Passing yards	168	27
Passing: comp–att–int	10–25–0	4–11–0
Turnovers		
Time of possession	27:40	32:20

Team	Category	Player	Statistics
TLS	Passing	Zach Smith	10/25, 168 yards, 1 TD
TLS	Rushing	Corey Taylor II	19 carries, 69 yards
TLS	Receiving	Josh Johnson	3 receptions, 76 yards, 1 TD
NAVY	Passing	Xavier Arline	4/8, 27 yards
NAVY	Rushing	Xavier Arline	27 carries, 60 yards
NAVY	Receiving	Mark Walker	3 receptions, 29 yards

=== At Army ===
Navy Midshipmen at Army Black Knights (121st Army–Navy Game)

Quarter	1	2	3	4	Total
Midshipmen	0	0	0	0	0
Black Knights	0	3	0	12	15

at Michie Stadium, West Point, NY

- Date: December 12, 2020
- Game time: 3:00 EST
- Game weather: Temperature: 43 °F (6 °C) • Wind: Calm • Weather: Dense Fog
- Game attendance: 12,722
- Referee: Duane Heydt
- TV announcers (CBS): Brad Nessler (play-by-play), Gary Danielson (analyst), & Jamie Erdahl (sideline)
- ESPN – Army beats Navy 15–0 at Michie Stadium /// Box Score, Navy at Army (121st Army–Navy Game) /// Navy Pregame Notes /// Army Pregame Notes /// Postgame Notes

Game information

First Quarter

No scoring

2nd quarter

- (12:41) ARMY FG: Quinn Maretzki 37-yard field goal
  Drive: 6 plays, 28 yard, 3:28; Army 3–0

3rd quarter

No scoring

4th quarter

- (11:02) ARMY TD: Tyhier Tyler 4-yard rush, Quinn Maretzki kick
  Drive: 5 plays, 13 yard, 3:02; Army 10–0
- (05:21) ARMY SF: Daryan McDonald 14-yard safety
  Drive: 0 plays, 0 yard, 0:00; Army 12–0
- (02:20) ARMY FG: Quinn Maretzki 40-yard field goal
  Drive: 6 plays, -1 yards, 3:01; Army 15–0

Statistics	NAVY	ARMY
First downs	4	8
Plays–yards	42–117	54–162
Rushes–yards	35–108	53–134
Passing yards	9	28
Passing: comp–att–int	1–7–0	1–1–0
Turnovers		
Time of possession	24:44	35:16

Team	Category	Player	Statistics
NAVY	Passing	Dalen Morris	1/3, 9 yards
NAVY	Rushing	Xavier Arline	17 carries, 109 yards
NAVY	Receiving	Mark Walker	1 reception, 9 yards
ARMY	Passing	Tyhier Tyler	1/1, 28 yards
ARMY	Rushing	Tyhier Tyler	26 carries, 96 yards, 1 TD
ARMY	Receiving	Tyrell Robinson	1 reception, 28 yards
