= 2020 Memphis Tigers football team =

American college football season

2020 Memphis Tigers football

Montgomery Bowl champion

Montgomery Bowl, W 25–10 vs. Florida Atlantic
- Conference: American Athletic Conference
- Record: 8–3 (5–3 American)
- Head coach: Ryan Silverfield (1st season)
- Offensive coordinator: Kevin Johns (2nd season)
- Offensive scheme: Spread
- Defensive coordinator: Mike MacIntyre (1st season)
- Base defense: 3–4
- Home stadium: Liberty Bowl Memorial Stadium

2020 American Athletic Conference football standings
	Conf.			Overall
Team	W		L	W		L
No. 8 Cincinnati y$	6	–	0	9	–	1
Tulsa y	6	–	0	6	–	3
Memphis	5	–	3	8	–	3
UCF	5	–	3	6	–	4
SMU	4	–	3	7	–	3
Houston	3	–	3	3	–	5
Navy	3	–	4	3	–	7
Tulane	3	–	5	6	–	6
East Carolina	3	–	5	3	–	6
Temple	1	–	6	1	–	6
South Florida	0	–	7	1	–	8
Championship: Cincinnati 27, Tulsa 24
$ – Conference champion; y – Championship game participant; Rankings from AP Poll.

The 2020 Memphis Tigers football team represented the University of Memphis in the 2020 NCAA Division I FBS football season. The Tigers played their home games at Liberty Bowl Memorial Stadium in Memphis, Tennessee, and competed in the American Athletic Conference. They were led by first-year head coach Ryan Silverfield.

== Schedule ==
Memphis had game scheduled against Purdue and UT Martin, which were canceled due to the COVID-19 pandemic. On September 12 the American announced that the Houston game scheduled for September 18 was postponed due to positive COVID-19 cases at Memphis. Subsequently, the scheduled game against UTSA on September 25 was also canceled due to ongoing cases at Memphis. The UTSA game was replaced with a game against Stephen F. Austin scheduled for November 21.

Date	Time	Opponent	Rank	Site	TV	Result	Attendance
September 5	7:00 p.m.	Arkansas State*		Liberty Bowl Memorial Stadium; Memphis, TN (Paint Bucket Bowl)	ESPN	W 37–24	4,537
October 3	2:30 p.m.	at SMU	No. 25	Gerald J. Ford Stadium; University Park, TX	ESPN2	L 27–30	7,898
October 17	2:30 p.m.	UCF		Liberty Bowl Memorial Stadium; Memphis, TN	ABC	W 50–49	10,554
October 24	11:00 a.m.	Temple		Liberty Bowl Memorial Stadium; Memphis, TN	ESPN+	W 41–29	10,321
October 31	11:00 a.m.	at No. 7 Cincinnati		Nippert Stadium; Cincinnati, OH (rivalry)	ESPN	L 10–49	0
November 7	11:00 a.m.	South Florida		Liberty Bowl Memorial Stadium; Memphis, TN	ESPN+	W 34–33	10,300
November 21	11:00 a.m.	Stephen F. Austin*		Liberty Bowl Memorial Stadium; Memphis, TN	ESPN+	W 56–14	9,684
November 28	6:00 p.m.	at Navy		Navy–Marine Corps Memorial Stadium; Annapolis, MD	CBSSN	W 10–7	0
December 5	11:00 a.m.	at Tulane		Yulman Stadium; New Orleans, LA	ESPN+	L 21–35	2,400
December 12	11:00 a.m.	Houston		Liberty Bowl Memorial Stadium; Memphis, TN	ESPN+	W 30–27	9,475
December 23	6:00 p.m.	vs. Florida Atlantic*		Cramton Bowl; Montgomery, AL (Montgomery Bowl)	ESPN	W 25–10	2,979
*Non-conference game; Rankings from AP Poll and CFP Rankings after November 24 released prior to game; All times are in Central time

Schedule source:

== Rankings ==
Ranking movements Legend: ██ Increase in ranking ██ Decrease in ranking — = Not ranked RV = Received votes
	Week																	
Poll	Pre	1	2	3	4	5	6	7	8	9	10	11	12	13	14	15	16	Final
AP	RV	RV*	16	17	25	RV	RV	RV	RV	—	—	—	—	—	—	—	RV	RV
Coaches	RV	RV*	15	20	24	RV	RV	RV	RV	RV	RV	RV	RV	RV	—	—	—	RV
CFP	Not released												—	—	—	—	—	Not released

== Game summaries ==
=== Arkansas State ===
Arkansas State at Memphis

Team	1	2	3	4	Total
Red Wolves	14	0	3	7	24
• RV Tigers	7	14	13	3	37

- Date: September 5, 2020
- Location: Liberty Bowl Memorial Stadium
  Memphis, TN
- Game start: 7:10 p.m. CDT
- Elapsed time: 3 hours and 44 minutes
- Game attendance: 4,537
- Game weather: 81 °F (27 °C) • Weather: Clear • Wind: NE 4 MPH
- Referee: Kyle Olson
- TV announcers (ESPN): Bob Wischusen (play–by–play), Dan Orlovsky (analyst), and Cole Cubelic (sideline reporter)

Scoring summary
1	10:36	ARST	Ryan Graham 1-yard rush (Blake Grupe kick) (12 plays, 75 yards, 4:24)	ARST 7–0
1	05:53	MEM	Sean Dykes 12-yard pass from Brady White (Riley Patterson kick) (12 plays, 85 yards, 4:43)	TIE 7–7
1	01:05	ARST	Isaiah Azubuike 1-yard rush (Blake Grupe kick) (8 plays, 84 yards, 2:16)	ARST 14–7
2	12:49	MEM	Rodrigues Clark 14-yard rush (Riley Patterson kick) (8 plays, 72 yards, 3:16)	TIE 14–14
2	00:24	MEM	Calvin Austin 9-yard pass from Brady White (Riley Patterson kick) (9 plays, 80 yards, 1:46)	MEM 21–14
3	11:05	ARST	Blake Grupe 28-yard field goal (7 plays, 17 yards, 2:34)	MEM 21–17
3	08:03	MEM	Damonte Coxie 8-yard pass from Brady White (Riley Patterson PAT failed) (7 plays, 50 yards, 3:02)	MEM 27–17
3	03:33	MEM	Sean Dykes 7-yard pass from Brady White (Riley Patterson kick) (6 plays, 47 yards, 2:59)	MEM 34–17
4	11:43	MEM	Riley Patterson 26-yard field goal (14 plays, 76 yards, 5:57)	MEM 37–17
4	07:42	ARST	TW Ayers 1-yard pass from Logan Bonner (Blake Grupe kick) (12 plays, 84 yards, 4:01)	MEM 37–24

Statistics	Arkansas State	Memphis
First downs	25	29
Total yards	424	502
Rushing yards	125	222
Passing yards	299	280
Turnovers	3	1
Time of possession	25:40	34:20

Team	Category	Player	Statistics
Arkansas State	Passing	Layne Hatcher	13/20, 166 yards
Arkansas State	Rushing	Jamal Jones	15 carries, 64 yards
Arkansas State	Receiving	Dahu Green	5 receptions, 99 yards
Memphis	Passing	Brady White	27/37, 280 yards, 4 TDs, 1 INT
Memphis	Rushing	Rodrigues Clark	20 carries, 105 yards, 1 TD
Memphis	Receiving	Sean Dykes	10 receptions, 137 yards, 2 TDs

=== At SMU ===
Memphis at Southern Methodist

Team	1	2	3	4	Total
No. 25 Tigers	3	17	7	0	27
• Mustangs	17	7	3	3	30

- Date: October 3, 2020
- Location: Gerald J. Ford Stadium
  University Park, TX
- Game start: 2:35 p.m. CDT
- Elapsed time: 3 hours and 31 minutes
- Game attendance: 7,989
- Game weather: 81 °F (27 °C) • Weather: Sunny • Wind: 11 S MPH
- Referee: C. Lamertina
- TV announcers (ESPN2): Anish Shroff (play–by–play), Tom Luginbill (analyst), and Kris Budden (sideline reporter)

Scoring summary
1	10:34	SMU	Chris Naggar 27-yard field goal (11 plays, 65 yards, 4:26)	SMU 7–0
1	07:58	MEM	Riley Patterson 26-yard field goal (11 plays, 67 yards, 2:36)	TIE 3–3
1	03:52	SMU	Danny Gray 3-yard pass from Shane Buechele (Chris Nagger kick) (10 plays, 75 yards, 4:06)	SMU 10–3
1	01:07	SMU	Reggie Roberson Jr. 70-yard pass from Shane Buechele (Chris Nagger kick) (3 plays, 75 yards, 1:20)	SMU 17–3
2	09:51	SMU	Reggie Roberson Jr. 85-yard pass from Shane Buechele (Chris Nagger kick) (3 plays, 80 yards, 1:47)	SMU 24–3
2	07:16	MEM	Calvin Austin 8-yard pass from Brady White (Riley Patterson kick) (9 plays, 75 yards, 2:35)	SMU 24–10
2	03:30	MEM	Sean Dykes 27-yard pass from Brady White (Riley Patterson kick) (5 plays, 83 yards, 2:06)	SMU 24–17
2	00:00	MEM	Riley Patterson 56-yard field goal (4 plays, 23 yards, 0:22)	SMU 24–20
3	09:29	SMU	Chris Nagger 25-yard field goal (9 plays, 46 yards, 3:42)	SMU 27–20
3	02:53	MEM	Tahj Washington 5-yard pass from Brady White (Riley Patterson kick) (14 plays, 87 yards, 6:33)	TIE 27–27
4	00:09	SMU	Chris Nagger 43-yard field goal (8 plays, 33 yards, 1:16)	SMU 30–27

Statistics	Memphis	SMU
First downs	26	21
Total yards	501	549
Rushing yards	205	75
Passing yards	296	474
Turnovers	4	2
Time of possession	30:51	29:09

Team	Category	Player	Statistics
Memphis	Passing	Brady White	29/42, 296 yards, 3 TDs, 2 INTs
Memphis	Rushing	Rodriguez Clark	16 carries, 98 yards
Memphis	Receiving	Sean Dykes	6 receptions, 85 yards, 1 TD
SMU	Passing	Shane Buechele	32/45, 474 yards, 3 TDs
SMU	Rushing	Ulysses Bentley IV	13 carries, 32 yards
SMU	Receiving	Reggie Roberson Jr.	5 receptions, 243 yards, 2 TDs

=== UCF ===
UCF at Memphis

Team	1	2	3	4	Total
RV Knights	7	20	8	14	49
• RV Tigers	7	7	15	21	50

- Date: October 17, 2020
- Location: Liberty Bowl Memorial Stadium
  Memphis, TN
- Game start: 2:42 p.m. CDT
- Elapsed time: 4 hours and 8 minutes
- Game attendance: 10,554
- Game weather: 69 °F (21 °C) • Weather: Sunny • Wind: SE 9 MPH
- Referee: Hank Johns
- TV announcers (ABC): Mark Jones (play–by–play), Roddy Jones (analyst), and Paul Carcaterra (sideline reporter)

Scoring summary
1	08:08	UCF	Greg McCrae 1-yard rsh (Daniel Obarski kick) (11 plays, 80 yards, 3:28)	UCF 7–0
1	07:11	MEM	Calvin Austin 12-yard pass from Brady White (Riley Patterson kick) (4 plays, 75 yards, 0:57)	TIE 7–7
2	12:14	UCF	Jaylon Robinson 43-yard pass from Dillon Gabriel (Daniel Obarski kick) (10 plays, 80 yards, 3:01)	UCF 14–7
2	07:35	UCF	Marlon Williams 85-yard pass from Dillon Gabriel (Daniel Obarski PAT blocked) (2 plays, 85 yards, 0:21)	UCF 20–7
2	02:06	MEM	Brady White 1-yard rush (Riley Patterson kick) (8 plays, 68 yards, 3:12)	UCF 20–14
2	00:12	UCF	Jaylon Robinson 10-yard pass from Dillon Gabriel (Daniel Obarski kick) (9 plays, 75 yards, 1:54)	UCF 27–14
3	11:32	UCF	Dillon Gabriel 14-yard rush (Dillon Gabriel two-point pass conversion to Marlon Williams) (11 plays, 75 yards, 3:28)	UCF 35–14
3	08:16	MEM	Kameron Wilson 6-yard pass from Brady White (Brady White two-point conversion pass to Tahj Washington) (9 plays, 75 yards, 3:16)	UCF 35–22
3	00:55	MEM	Javon Ivory 17-yard pass from Brady White (Riley Patterson kick) (8 plays, 96 yards, 3:28)	UCF 35–29
4	12:40	UCF	Ryan O'Keefe 93-yard pass from Dillon Gabriel (Dillon Gabriel two-point conversion pass to Marlon Williams) (1 play, 93 yards, 0:13)	UCF 43–29
4	09:16	MEM	Sean Dykes 3-yard pass from Brady White (Brady White two-point conversion pass to Sean Dykes) (12 plays, 75 yards, 3:24)	UCF 43–37
4	05:29	UCF	Jacob Harris 10-yard pass from Dillon Gabriel (two-point pass conversion attempt failed) (12 plays, 75 yards, 3:47)	UCF 49–37
4	03:41	MEM	Kylan Watkins 22-yard pass from Brady White (Riley Patterson kick) (6 plays, 84 yards, 1:48)	UCF 49–44
4	01:08	MEM	Calvin Austin 4-yard pass from Brady White (two-point rush conversion attempt failed) (9 plays, 85 yards, 1:30)	MEM 50–49

Statistics	UCF	Memphis
First downs	34	41
Total yards	798	703
Rushing yards	197	217
Passing yards	601	486
Turnovers	1	1
Time of possession	26:23	33:37

Team	Category	Player	Statistics
UCF	Passing	Dillon Gabriel	35/49, 601 yards, 5 TDs
UCF	Rushing	Greg McCrae	17 carries, 78 yards, 1 TD
UCF	Receiving	Marlon Williams	13 receptions, 191 yards, 1 TD
Memphis	Passing	Brady White	34/50, 486 yards, 6 TDs
Memphis	Rushing	Rodrigues Clark	21 carries, 112 yards
Memphis	Receiving	Calvin Austin	9 receptions, 151 yards, 2 TDs

=== Temple ===
Temple at Memphis

Team	1	2	3	4	Total
Owls	3	12	7	7	29
• Tigers	7	3	17	14	41

- Date: October 24, 2020
- Location: Liberty Bowl Memorial Stadium
  Memphis, TN
- Game start: 11:05 a.m. CDT
- Elapsed time: 3 hours and 36 minutes
- Game attendance: 10,321
- Game weather: 50 °F (10 °C) • Weather: Overcast • Wind: NNE 12 MPH
- Referee: A Calabrase
- TV announcers (ESPN+): Lincoln Rose (play–by–play) and Keith Moreland (analyst)

Scoring summary
1	05:29	MEM	Tahj Washington 3-yard pass from Brady White (Riley Patterson kick) (11 plays, 80 yards, 3:21)	MEM 7–0
1	01:42	TEM	Will Mobley 25-yard field goal (4 plays, 2 yards, 1:22)	MEM 7–3
2	07:41	TEM	Jadan Blue 5-yard pass from Anthony Russo (Will Mobley PAT blocked) (8 plays, 65 yards, 2:49)	TEM 9–7
2	03:34	MEM	Riley Patterson 42-yard field goal (4 plays, 1 yard, 1:20)	MEM 10–9
2	00:31	TEM	Branden Mack 10-yard pass from Anthony Russo (two-point conversion pass attempt failed) (12 plays, 75 yards, 3:03)	TEM 15–10
3	08:40	MEM	Riley Patterson 42-yard field goal (13 plays, 47 yards, 6:15)	TEM 15–13
3	07:52	MEM	Calvin Austin 65-yard pass from Brady White (Riley Patterson kick) (2 plays, 66 yards, 0:40)	MEM 20–15
3	06:30	MEM	Tahj Washington 26-yard pass from Brady White (Riley Patterson kick) (2 plays, 54 yards, 0:45)	MEM 27–15
3	02:37	TEM	Jadan Blue 32-yard pass from Anthony Russo (Will Mobley kick) (8 plays, 78 yards, 3:48)	MEM 27–22
4	12:02	MEM	Javon Ivory 7-yard pass from Brady White (Riley Patterson kick) (9 plays, 45 yards, 3:09)	MEM 34–22
4	10:11	TEM	Jadan Blue 8-yard pass from Anthony Russo (Will Mobley kick) (7 plays, 75 yards, 1:51)	MEM 34–29
4	02:15	MEM	Kylan Watkins 15-yard rush (Riley Patterson kick) (8 plays, 88 yards, 2:52)	MEM 41–29

Statistics	Temple	Memphis
First downs	30	24
Total yards	500	489
Rushing yards	113	176
Passing yards	387	313
Turnovers	4	3
Time of possession	33:28	26:32

Team	Category	Player	Statistics
Temple	Passing	Anthony Russo	41/63, 387 yards, 4 TDs, 3 INTs
Temple	Rushing	Re'Mahn Davis	20 carries, 113 yards
Temple	Receiving	Randle Jones	12 receptions, 118 yards
Memphis	Passing	Brady White	17/36, 313 yards, 4 TDs, 1 INT
Memphis	Rushing	Rodrigues Clark	22 carries, 106 yards
Memphis	Receiving	Calvin Austin	6 receptions, 184 yards, 1 TD

=== At Cincinnati ===
Memphis at Cincinnati

Team	1	2	3	4	Total
Tigers	7	3	0	0	10
• No. 7 Bearcats	7	14	14	14	49

- Date: October 31, 2020
- Location: Nippert Stadium
  Cincinnati, OH
- Game start: 11:02 a.m. CDT
- Elapsed time: 3 hours and 16 minutes
- Game attendance: 0
- Game weather: 48 °F (9 °C) • Weather: Partly Cloudy • Wind: SE 6 MPH
- Referee: C Lamertina
- TV announcers (ESPN): Mark Jones (play–by–play), Dusty Dvoracek (analyst), and Paul Carcaterra (sideline reporter)

Scoring summary
1	09:15	CIN	Alec Pierce 43-yard pass from Desmond Ridder (Cole Smith kick) (6 plays, 75 yards, 2:18)	CIN 7–0
1	04:07	MEM	Tahj Washington 92-yard pass from Brady White (Riley Patterson kick) (1 play, 92 yards, 0:15)	TIE 7–7
2	13:58	CIN	Desmond Ridder 13-yard rush (Cole Smith kick) (11 plays, 75 yards, 5:09)	CIN 14–7
2	04:04	CIN	Michael Young Jr. 6-yard pass from Desmond Ridder (Cole Smith kick) (8 plays, 70 yards, 4:14)	CIN 21–7
2	00:28	MEM	Riley Patterson 42-yard field goal (12 plays, 60 yards, 3:36)	CIN 21–10
3	06:23	CIN	Desmond Ridder 9-yard rush (Cole Smith kick) (9 plays, 90 yards, 4:53)	CIN 28–10
3	01:29	CIN	Tre Tucker 21-yard pass from Desmond Ridder (Cole Smith kick) (5 plays, 55 yards, 2:41)	CIN 35–10
4	08:02	CIN	Jerome Ford 33-yard rush (Cole Smith kick) (1 play, 33 yards, 0:08)	CIN 42–10
4	01:30	CIN	Jerome Ford 48-yard rush (Cole Smith kick) (6 plays, 67 yards, 3:42)	CIN 49–10

Statistics	Memphis	Cincinnati
First downs	15	28
Total yards	321	513
Rushing yards	5	242
Passing yards	316	271
Turnovers	1	1
Time of possession	25:10	34:50

Team	Category	Player	Statistics
Memphis	Passing	Brady White	18/35, 316 yards, 1 TD
Memphis	Rushing	Rodrigues Clark	12 carries, 16 yards
Memphis	Receiving	Calvin Austin	7 receptions, 121 yards
Cincinnati	Passing	Desmond Ridder	21/26, 271 yards, 3 TDs, 1 INT
Cincinnati	Rushing	Jerome Ford	9 carries, 116 yards, 2 TDs
Cincinnati	Receiving	Alec Pierce	3 receptions, 61 yards, 1 TD

=== South Florida ===
South Florida at Memphis

Team	1	2	3	4	Total
Bulls	3	24	3	3	33
• Tigers	6	7	7	14	34

- Date: November 7, 2020
- Location: Liberty Bowl Memorial Stadium
  Memphis, TN
- Game start: 11:05 a.m. CST
- Elapsed time: 3 hours and 14 minutes
- Game attendance: 10,300
- Game weather: 73 °F (23 °C) • Weather: Clear • Wind: SE 7 MPH
- Referee: Hank Johns
- TV announcers (ESPN+): Lincoln Rose (play–by–play) and LaDarrin McLane (analyst)

Scoring summary
1	12:19	USF	Spencer Shrader 49-yard field goal (4 plays, 2 yards, 1:23)	USF 3–0
1	07:32	MEM	Riley Patterson 52-yard field goal (5 plays, 31 yards, 1:37)	TIE 3–3
1	03:33	MEM	Riley Patterson 33-yard field goal (7 plays, 43 yards, 2:14)	MEM 6–3
2	14:18	USF	Spencer Shrader 47-yard field goal (11 plays, 46 yards, 4:15)	TIE 6–6
2	13:02	USF	Daquan Evans 51-yard interception returned (Jared Sackett kick) (3 plays, 10 yards, 1:09)	USF 13–6
2	11:33	MEM	Calvin Austin 65-yard pass from Brady White (Riley Patterson kick) (3 plays, 69 yards, 1:23)	TIE 13–13
2	11:24	USF	Kelley Joiner Jr. 75-yard pass from Noah Johnson (Jared Sackett kick) (1 play, 75 yards, 0:09)	USF 20–13
2	03:52	USF	Mitchell Brinkman 3-yard pass from Noah Johnson (Jared Sackett kick) (7 plays, 63 yards, 3:05)	USF 27–13
3	08:52	MEM	Sean Dykes 5-yard pass from Brady White (Riley Patterson kick) (10 plays, 59 yards, 5:09)	USF 27–20
3	03:58	USF	Spencer Shrader 41-yard field goal (11 plays, 67 yards, 4:50)	USF 30–20
4	04:36	USF	Spencer Shrader 46-yard field goal (6 plays, 20 yards, 3:39)	USF 33–20
4	03:19	MEM	Sean Dykes 10-yard pass from Brady White (Riley Patterson kick) (7 plays, 72 yards, 1:17)	USF 33–27
4	01:03	MEM	Calvin Austin III 9-yard pass from Brady White (Riley Patterson kick) (8 plays, 76 yards, 1:20)	MEM 34–33

Statistics	South Florida	Memphis
First downs	16	24
Total yards	330	535
Rushing yards	113	98
Passing yards	217	437
Turnovers	0	1
Time of possession	29:25	30:35

Team	Category	Player	Statistics
South Florida	Passing	Noah Johnson	20/29, 217 yards, 2 TDs
South Florida	Rushing	Brian Battie	10 carries, 76 yards
South Florida	Receiving	Kelley Joiner Jr.	3 receptions, 78 yards, 1 TD
Memphis	Passing	Brady White	30/50, 437 yards, 4 TDs, 1 INT
Memphis	Rushing	Kylan Watkins	10 carries, 44 yards
Memphis	Receiving	Sean Dykes	7 receptions, 147 yards, 2 TDs

=== Stephen F. Austin ===
Stephen F. Austin at Memphis

Team	1	2	3	4	Total
Lumberjacks	0	14	0	0	14
• Tigers	14	6	15	21	56

- Date: November 21, 2020
- Location: Liberty Bowl Memorial Stadium
  Memphis, TN
- Game start: 11:05 a.m. CST
- Elapsed time: 3 hours and 23 minutes
- Game attendance: 9,684
- Game weather: 70 °F (21 °C) • Weather: Cloudy • Wind: S 6 MPH
- Referee: Nate Black
- TV announcers (ESPN+): David Saltzman (play–by–play) and Keith Moreland (analyst)

Scoring summary
1	09:02	MEM	Rodrigues Clark 4-yard rush (Riley Patterson kick) (11 plays, 75 yards, 3:32)	MEM 7–0
1	05:18	MEM	Tahj Washington 48-yard pass from Brady White (Riley Patterson kick) (4 plays, 58 yards, 1:04)	MEM 14–0
2	14:02	SFA	Brevin Randle 30-yard interception returned (Chris Campos kick) (1 play, 0 yards, 0:08)	MEM 14–7
2	09:41	MEM	Riley Patterson 39-yard field goal (9 plays, 44 yards, 4:17)	MEM 17–7
2	06:55	MEM	Riley Patterson 23-yard field goal (6 plays, 45 yards, 1:44)	MEM 20–7
2	00:58	SFA	Xavier Gipson 7-yard pass from Trae Self (Chris Campos kick) (9 plays, 65 yards, 2:32)	MEM 20–14
3	02:55	MEM	Brady White 1-yard rush (Calvin Austin III two-point conversion pass to Sean Dykes) (8 plays, 59 yards, 3:04)	MEM 28–14
3	01:24	MEM	Calvin Austin 64-yard punt returned (Riley Patterson kick) (3 plays, 3 yards, 1:31)	MEM 35–14
4	14:00	MEM	Asa Martin 6-yard rush (Riley Patterson kick) (4 plays, 35 yards, 1:06)	MEM 42–14
4	10:35	MEM	Marquavius Weaver 4-yard rush (Riley Patterson kick) (4 plays, 65 yards, 1:42)	MEM 49–14
4	02:42	MEM	Timothy Taylor 47-yard rush (Riley Patterson kick) (5 plays, 69 yards, 1:53)	MEM 56–14

Statistics	Stephen F. Austin	Memphis
First downs	11	25
Total yards	224	574
Rushing yards	55	305
Passing yards	169	269
Turnovers	2	1
Time of possession	29:42	30:18

Team	Category	Player	Statistics
Stephen F. Austin	Passing	Trae Self	14/30, 124 yards, 1 TD, 2 INTs
Stephen F. Austin	Rushing	Jaquarion Turner	14 carries, 22 yards
Stephen F. Austin	Receiving	Xavier Gipson	6 receptions, 74 yards, 1 TD
Memphis	Passing	Brady White	18/31, 269 yards, 1 TD, 1 INT
Memphis	Rushing	Kylan Watkins	11 carries, 100 yards
Memphis	Receiving	Calvin Austin	10 receptions, 173 yards

=== At Navy ===
Memphis at Navy

Team	1	2	3	4	Total
• Tigers	7	0	0	3	10
Midshipmen	7	0	0	0	7

- Date: November 28, 2020
- Location: Navy–Marine Corps Memorial Stadium
  Annapolis, MD
- Game start: 6:02 p.m. CST
- Elapsed time: 3 hours and 2 minutes
- Game attendance: 0
- Game weather: 53 °F (12 °C) • Weather: Clear
- Referee: Luke Richmond
- TV announcers (CBS Sports Network): John Sadak (play–by–play), Randy Cross (analyst), and Sheehan Stanwick-Burch (sideline reporter)

Scoring summary
1	06:07	NAVY	Nelson Smith 22-yard rush (Bijan Nichols kick) (8 plays, 83 yards, 4:00)	NAVY 7–0
1	03:52	MEM	Calvin Austin III 14-yard pass from Brady White (Riley Patterson kick) (6 plays, 79 yards, 2:15)	TIE 7–7
4	10:53	MEM	Riley Patterson 26-yard field goal (9 plays, 46 yards, 4:01)	MEM 10–7

Statistics	Memphis	Navy
First downs	12	14
Total yards	280	321
Rushing yards	75	233
Passing yards	205	88
Turnovers	0	2
Time of possession	26:02	33:58

Team	Category	Player	Statistics
Memphis	Passing	Brady White	18/32, 205, 1 TD
Memphis	Rushing	Marquavius Weaver	15 carries, 49 yards
Memphis	Receiving	Tahj Washington	4 receptions, 68 yards
Navy	Passing	Tyger Goslin	3/9, 73 yards, 1 INT
Navy	Rushing	Nelson Smith	29 carries, 142 yards, 1 TD
Navy	Receiving	Chance Warren	1 reception, 41 yards

=== At Tulane ===
Memphis at Tulane

Team	1	2	3	4	Total
Tigers	7	7	7	0	21
• Green Wave	14	7	7	7	35

- Date: December 5, 2020
- Location: Yulman Stadium
  New Orleans, LA
- Game start: 11:05 p.m. CST
- Elapsed time: 3 hours and 24 minutes
- Game attendance: 2,400
- Game weather: 52 °F (11 °C) • Weather: Partly Cloudy • Wind: NE 10 MPH
- Referee: Charles Lamerti
- TV announcers (ESPN+): David Saltzman (play–by–play) and Keith Moreland (analyst)

Scoring summary
1	10:58	TULN	Duece Watts 15-yard pas from Michael Pratt (Merek Glover kick) (10 plays, 75 yards, 4:02)	TULN 7–0
1	10:05	MEM	Calvin Austin 59-yard pass from Brady White (Riley Patterson kick) (4 plays, 75 yards, 0:53)	TIE 7–7
1	04:00	TULN	Jha'Quan Jackson 42-yard pas from Michael Pratt (Merek Glover kick) (7 plays, 65 yards, 3:20)	TULN 14–7
2	11:09	TULN	Michael Pratt 3-yard rush (Merek Glover kick) (9 plays, 83 yards, 3:55)	TULN 21–7
2	01:18	MEM	Tahj Washington 2-yard rush (Riley Patterson kick) (13 plays, 67 yards, 4:38)	TULN 21–14
3	08:59	TULN	Michael Pratt 10-yard rush (Merek Glover kick) (7 plays, 57 yards, 3:09)	TULN 28–14
3	05:13	MEM	Sean Dykes 6-yard pass from Brady White (Riley Patterson kick) (9 plays, 70 yards, 3:38)	TULN 28–21
4	11:34	TULN	Cameron Carroll 9-yard rush (Merek Glover kick) (11 plays, 80 yards, 4:13)	TULN 35–21

Statistics	Memphis	Tulane
First downs	20	26
Total yards	300	419
Rushing yards	45	165
Passing yards	255	254
Turnovers	2	1
Time of possession	25:56	34:04

Team	Category	Player	Statistics
Memphis	Passing	Brady White	19/38, 248 yards, 2 TDs, 2 INTs
Memphis	Rushing	Asa Martin	13 carries, 39 yards
Memphis	Receiving	Calvin Austin	5 receptions, 110 yards, 1 TD
Tulane	Passing	Michael Pratt	21/33, 254 yards, 2 TDs
Tulane	Rushing	Stephon Huderson	10 carries, 67 yards
Tulane	Receiving	Jha'Quan Jackson	3 receptions, 57 yards, 1 TD

=== Houston ===
Houston at Memphis

Team	1	2	3	4	Total
Cougars	3	3	0	21	27
• Tigers	3	14	10	3	30

- Date: December 12, 2020
- Location: Liberty Bowl Memorial Stadium
  Memphis, TN
- Game start: 2:45 p.m. CST
- Elapsed time: 3 hours and 25 minutes
- Game attendance: 9,475
- Game weather: 57 °F (14 °C) • Weather: Clear • Wind: W 11 MPH
- Referee: Hank Johns
- TV announcers (ESPN2/ESPN+): David Saltzman (play–by–play) and Keith Moreland (analyst)

Scoring summary
1	07:57	HOU	Dalton Witherspoon 28-yard field goal (15 plays, 64 yards, 7:03)	HOU 3–0
1	00:22	MEM	Riley Patterson 34-yard field goal (14 plays, 56 yards, 4:59)	TIE 3–3
2	08:14	HOU	Dalton Witherspoon 29-yard field goal (10 plays, 60 yards, 4:32)	HOU 6–3
2	05:21	MEM	Tahj Washington 4-yard pass from Brady White (Riley Patterson kick) (8 plays, 75 yards, 2:53)	MEM 10–6
2	00:31	MEM	Jaylon Allen 85-yard fumble return (Riley Patterson kick) (8 plays, 45 yards, 3:16)	MEM 17–6
3	11:46	MEM	Calvin Austin 15-yard pass from Brady White (Riley Patterson kick) (9 plays, 75 yards, 3:14)	MEM 24–6
3	02:15	MEM	Riley Patterson 49-yard field goal (12 plays, 55 yards, 6:30)	MEM 27–6
4	13:01	HOU	Marquez Stevenson 13-yard pass from Clayton Tune (Dalton Witherspoon kick) (11 plays, 75 yards, 4:09)	MEM 27–13
4	08:07	HOU	Clayton Tune 19-yard rush (Dalton Witherspoon kick) (6 plays, 40 yards, 1:33)	MEM 27–20
4	00:28	HOU	Bryson Smith 18-yard pass from Clayton Tune (Dalton Witherspoon kick) (15 plays, 70 yards, 4:46)	TIE 27–27
4	00:00	MEM	Riley Patterson 47-yard field goal (5 plays, 46 yards, 0:28)	MEM 30–27

Statistics	Houston	Memphis
First downs	26	20
Total yards	409	310
Rushing yards	139	64
Passing yards	270	246
Turnovers	2	1
Time of possession	33:29	26:31

Team	Category	Player	Statistics
Houston	Passing	Clayton Tune	30/49, 270 yards, 2 TDs, 1 INT
Houston	Rushing	Kyle Porter	15 carries, 70 yards
Houston	Receiving	Christian Trahan	5 receptions, 84 yards
Memphis	Passing	Brady White	22/35, 246 yards, 2 TDs, 1 INT
Memphis	Rushing	Asa Martin	11 carries, 27 yards
Memphis	Receiving	Calvin Austin	7 receptions, 74 yards, 1 TD

=== Vs. Florida Atlantic (Montgomery Bowl) ===
2020 Montgomery Bowl

Team	1	2	3	4	Total
• Tigers	10	8	7	0	25
Owls	0	0	10	0	10

- Date: December 23, 2020
- Location: Cramton Bowl
  Montgomery, AL
- Game start: 6:01 p.m. CST
- Elapsed time: 3 hours and 15 minutes
- Game attendance: 2,979
- Game weather: 61 °F (16 °C) • Weather: Cloudy, Some Rain • Wind: NNW 7 MPH
- Referee: Marshall Lewis
- TV announcers (ESPN/1stTm): Clay Matvick (play–by–play), Rocky Boiman (analyst), and Lauren Sisler (sideline reporter)/Mike Grace (play-by-play) and Cole Cubelic (analyst)

Scoring summary
1	07:15	MEM	Riley Patterson 53-yard field goal (10 plays, 53 yards, 3:20)	MEM 3–0
1	02:26	MEM	Javon Ivory 5-yard pass from Brady White (Riley Patterson kick) (8 plays, 52 yards, 3:18)	MEM 10–0
2	00:22	MEM	Joseph Dorceus 2-yard pass from Brady White (John Hassell two-point conversion rush) (10 plays, 58 yards, 4:25)	MEM 18–0
3	09:53	FAU	TJ Chase 3-yard pass from Nick Tronti (Vladimir Rivas kick) (9 plays, 73 yards, 3:14)	MEM 18–7
3	07:38	FAU	Vladimir Rivas 27-yard field goal (7 plays, 16 yards, 2:15)	MEM 18–10
3	05:14	MEM	Calvin Austin 7-yard pass from Brady White (Riley Patterson kick) (7 plays, 75 yards, 2:24)	MEM 25–10

Statistics	Memphis	Florida Atlantic
First downs	24	19
Total yards	469	290
Rushing yards	185	139
Passing yards	284	151
Turnovers	3	2
Time of possession	30:44	29:16

Team	Category	Player	Statistics
Memphis	Passing	Brady White	22/34, 284 yards, 3 TDs, 1 INT
Memphis	Rushing	Asa Martin	15 carries, 96 yards
Memphis	Receiving	Javon Ivory	7 receptions, 126 yards, 1 TD
Florida Atlantic	Passing	Nick Tronti	16/32, 146 yards, 1 TD, 1 INT
Florida Atlantic	Rushing	James Charles	16 carries, 82 yards
Florida Atlantic	Receiving	Brandon Robinson	4 receptions, 39 yards

== Players drafted into the NFL ==
Round	Pick	Player	Position	NFL Club
5	150	Kenneth Gainwell	RB	Philadelphia Eagles
