= 2020 American Athletic Conference football season =

- League: NCAA Division I Football Bowl Subdivision
- Sport: Football
- Duration: September 2020 through January 2021
- Teams: 11
- TV partner(s): ABC, ESPN, ESPN2, ESPNU, and CBS Sports Network

2021 NFL Draft
- Top draft pick: Zaven Collins (Tulsa)
- Picked by: Arizona Cardinals, 16th overall

Regular season
- Season champions: Cincinnati
- Runners-up: Tulsa

The American Championship

Football seasons
- ← 2019 2021 →

2020 American Athletic Conference football standings
	Conf.			Overall
Team	W		L	W		L
No. 8 Cincinnati y$	6	–	0	9	–	1
Tulsa y	6	–	0	6	–	3
Memphis	5	–	3	8	–	3
UCF	5	–	3	6	–	4
SMU	4	–	3	7	–	3
Houston	3	–	3	3	–	5
Navy	3	–	4	3	–	7
Tulane	3	–	5	6	–	6
East Carolina	3	–	5	3	–	6
Temple	1	–	6	1	–	6
South Florida	0	–	7	1	–	8
Championship: Cincinnati 27, Tulsa 24
$ – Conference champion; y – Championship game participant; Rankings from AP Poll.

The 2020 American Athletic Conference football season is the 29th NCAA Division I Football Bowl Subdivision season of the American Athletic Conference (The American). The season is the eighth since the former Big East Conference dissolved and became the American Athletic Conference and the seventh season of the College Football Playoff in place. The American is considered a member of the Group of Five (G5) together with Conference USA (C–USA), the Mid-American Conference (MAC), the Mountain West Conference and the Sun Belt Conference.

== Preseason ==
=== Departure of UConn ===
The Huskies' Big East entrance date was confirmed for July 1, 2020 after UConn and The American reached a buyout agreement. At the time this agreement was announced, UConn also announced that its football team would become an FBS independent once it joined the Big East. The American has no immediate plan to add another team to rebalance division, so divisions have been eliminated from the conference for the time being.

=== Recruiting classes ===
Rankings
Team	ESPN	Rivals	24/7
Cincinnati	49	39	40
East Carolina	73	65	74
Houston	71	79	72
Memphis		70	65
Navy		83	127
SMU	68		70
South Florida			109
Temple		77	100
Tulane	67	64	69
Tulsa		84	115
UCF	66	58	75

=== American Athletic Conference Media Days ===
The 2020 American Athletic Conference Media Day was originally scheduled for July 12–14 in Newport, Rhode Island. On May 4, 2020 The American Announced due to the COVID-19 pandemic media day was canceled.

==== Preseason media poll ====
The preseason Poll was released September 1

Media poll
Predicted finish	Team	Votes (1st place)
1	UCF	204 (10)
2	Cincinnati	201 (7)
3	Memphis	192 (2)
4	SMU	146
5	Navy	125 (1)
6	Tulane	118
7	Houston	114
8	Temple	88
9	Tulsa	49
10	East Carolina	42
11	South Florida	41

== Head coaches ==
=== Coaching changes ===
At the end of his third season ended in a 4–8 record, South Florida fired Charlie Strong. On December 9, 2019, Jeff Scott, offensive coordinator for Clemson, was hired as the new head coach.

On December 8, 2019 after Norvell's departure to Florida State, Silverfield served as the interim head coach before being promoted to head coach on December 13, 2019.

=== Coaches ===
Note: All stats current through the completion of the 2020 season

Team	Head coach	Years at school	Overall record	Record at school	AAC record
Cincinnati	Luke Fickell	4	41–21 (.661)	35–14 (.714)	21–9 (.700)
East Carolina	Mike Houston	2	87–39 (.690)	7–14 (.333)	4–12 (.250)
Houston	Dana Holgorsen	2	68–54 (.557)	7–13 (.350)	5–9 (.357)
Memphis	Ryan Silverfield	1	8–4 (.667)	8–4 (.667)	5–3 (.625)
Navy	Ken Niumatalolo	13	101–67 (.601)	101–67 (.601)	30–17 (.638)
SMU	Sonny Dykes	3	63–59 (.516)	22–14 (.611)	14–9 (.609)
South Florida	Jeff Scott	1	1–8 (.111)	1–8 (.111)	0–7 (.000)
Temple	Rod Carey	2	61–41 (.598)	9–11 (.450)	6–9 (.400)
Tulane	Willie Fritz	5	183–102 (.642)	29–33 (.468)	15–25 (.375)
Tulsa	Philip Montgomery	6	31–40 (.437)	31–40 (.437)	19–26 (.422)
UCF	Josh Heupel	3	28–8 (.778)	28–8 (.778)	19–5 (.792)

== Rankings ==
		Pre	Wk 2	Wk 3	Wk 4	Wk 5	Wk 6	Wk 7	Wk 8	Wk 9	Wk 10	Wk 11	Wk 12	Wk 13	Wk 14	Wk 15	Wk 16	Final
Cincinnati	AP	20	13	14	15	11	8	9	7	6	7	7	7	7	7	6	6	8
Cincinnati	C	22	14	16	15	11	10	10	7	6	7	7	7	7	7	6	6	8
Cincinnati	CFP	Not released											7	7	8	9	8	
East Carolina	AP																	
East Carolina	C																	
East Carolina	CFP	Not released																
Houston	AP		RV				RV											
Houston	C						RV		RV									
Houston	CFP	Not released																
Memphis	AP	RV	16	17	25	RV	RV	RV	RV								RV	RV
Memphis	C	RV	15	20	24	RV	RV	RV	RV	RV	RV	RV	RV	RV				RV
Memphis	CFP	Not released																
Navy	AP	RV																
Navy	C	RV																
Navy	CFP	Not released																
SMU	AP	RV	RV	RV	RV	18	17	16	22	18	19	RV	RV	RV				
SMU	C	RV	RV	RV	RV	21	18	16	23	18	19	RV	RV		RV	RV	RV	RV
SMU	CFP	Not released																
South Florida	AP		RV															
South Florida	C		RV															
South Florida	CFP	Not released																
Temple	AP																	
Temple	C																	
Temple	CFP	Not released																
Tulane	AP																	
Tulane	C	RV	RV															
Tulane	CFP	Not released																
Tulsa	AP					RV	RV	RV	RV	RV	RV	25	24	22	18	20	22	RV
Tulsa	C					RV	RV	RV	RV	RV	RV	RV	25	22	19	20	25	RV
Tulsa	CFP	Not released											25	24	24	23	24	
UCF	AP	21	14	13	11	RV	RV					RV		RV	RV	RV	RV	
UCF	C	21	13	15	12	25	RV	RV	RV	RV				RV				
UCF	CFP	Not released																

Legend
	Improvement in ranking
	Drop in ranking
	Not ranked previous week
	No change in ranking from previous week
RV	Received votes but were not ranked in Top 25 of poll
т	Tied with team above or below also with this symbol

== Schedule ==
The regular season will begin on September 5, 2020 and will end on November 28, 2020. The season will conclude with the 2020 American Athletic Conference Championship Game on December 19.

=== Regular season ===
Index to colors and formatting
American member won
American member lost
American teams in **bold**

==== Week One ====
Date	Time	Visiting team	Home team	Site	TV	Result	Attendance	Ref.
September 5	4:30 p.m.	**SMU**	Texas State	Bobcat Stadium • San Marcos, TX	ESPN	**W** 31–24	7,500	
September 5	8:00 p.m.	Arkansas State	**Memphis**	Liberty Bowl Memorial Stadium • Memphis, TN (Paint Bucket Bowl)	ESPN	**W** 37–24	4,537	
September 7	8:00 p.m.	BYU	**Navy**	Navy–Marine Corps Memorial Stadium • Annapolis, MD	ESPN	**L** 55–3	0	
^{#}Rankings from AP Poll released prior to game. All times are in Eastern Time.

Date	Bye Week							
September 5	Cincinnati	East Carolina	Houston	South Florida	Temple	Tulane	Tulsa	UCF

==== Week Two ====
Date	Time	Visiting team	Home team	Site	TV	Result	Attendance	Ref.
September 12	7:00 p.m.	The Citadel	**South Florida**	Raymond James Stadium • Tampa, FL	ESPNU	**W** 27–6	0	
September 12	7:30 p.m.	**Tulane**	South Alabama	Hancock Whitney Stadium • Mobile, AL	ESPN2	**W** 27–24	6,000	
^{#}Rankings from AP Poll released prior to game. All times are in Eastern Time.

Date	Bye Week								
September 12	Cincinnati	East Carolina	Houston	Memphis	Navy	SMU	Temple	Tulsa	UCF

==== Week Three ====
Date	Time	Visiting team	Home team	Site	TV	Result	Attendance	Ref.
September 19	12:00 p.m.	**Navy**	**Tulane**	Yulman Stadium • New Orleans, LA	ABC	**NAVY** 27–24	0	
September 19	12:00 p.m.	Austin Peay	No. 13 **Cincinnati**	Nippert Stadium • Cincinnati, OH	ESPN+	**W** 55–20	0	
September 19	12:00 p.m.	**Tulsa**	No. 11 Oklahoma State	Boone Pickens Stadium • Stillwater, OK	ESPN	**L** 16–7	14,668	
September 19	2:30 p.m.	**South Florida**	No. 7 Notre Dame	Notre Dame Stadium • South Bend, IN	USA	**L** 52–0	10,085	
September 19	3:30 p.m.	No. 14 **UCF**	Georgia Tech	Bobby Dodd Stadium • Atlanta, GA	ABC	**W** 49–21	11,000	
September 19	6:00 p.m.	**SMU**	North Texas	Apogee Stadium • Denton, TX (Safeway Bowl)	CBSSN	**W** 65–35	8,464	
^{#}Rankings from AP Poll released prior to game. All times are in Eastern Time.

Date	Bye Week			
September 19	East Carolina	Houston	Memphis	Temple

==== Week Four ====
Date	Time	Visiting team	Home team	Site	TV	Result	Attendance	Ref.
September 26	12:00 p.m.	No. 13 **UCF**	**East Carolina**	Dowdy–Ficklen Stadium • Greenville, NC	ABC	**UCF** 51–28	305	
September 26	3:30 p.m.	No. 22 Army	No. 14 **Cincinnati**	Nippert Stadium • Cincinnati, OH	ESPN	**W** 24–10	0	
September 26	7:00 p.m.	**Tulane**	Southern Miss	M. M. Roberts Stadium • Hattiesburg, MS (Battle for the Bell)	Stadium	**W** 66–24	0	
September 26	7:00 p.m.	Stephen F. Austin	**SMU**	Gerald J. Ford Stadium • University Park, TX	ESPN+	**W** 50–7	7,898	
^{#}Rankings from AP Poll released prior to game. All times are in Eastern Time.

Date	Bye Week					
September 26	Houston	Memphis	Navy	South Florida	Temple	Tulsa

==== Week Five ====
Date	Time	Visiting team	Home team	Site	TV	Result	Attendance	Ref.
October 3	12:00 p.m.	**East Carolina**	Georgia State	Center Parc Stadium • Atlanta, GA	ESPNU	**L** 29–49	3,823	
October 3	3:30 p.m.	**South Florida**	**No. 15 Cincinnati**	Nippert Stadium • Cincinnati, OH	ESPN+	**CIN** 28–7	0	
October 3	3:30 p.m.	**No. 25 Memphis**	**SMU**	Gerald J. Ford Stadium • University Park, TX	ESPN2	**SMU** 30–27	7,898	
October 3	6:00 p.m.	**Navy**	Air Force	Falcon Stadium • Colorado Springs, CO (Commander-in-Chief's Trophy)	CBSSN	**L** 7–40	5,000	
October 3	7:30 p.m.	**Tulsa**	**No. 11 UCF**	Bounce House • Orlando, FL	ESPN2	**TLSA** 34–26	8,874	
^{#}Rankings from AP Poll released prior to game. All times are in Eastern Time.

Date	Bye Week		
October 3	Houston	Temple	Tulane

==== Week Six ====
Date	Time	Visiting team	Home team	Site	TV	Result	Attendance	Ref.
October 8	7:30 p.m.	**Tulane**	**Houston**	TDECU Stadium • Houston, TX	ESPN	**HOU** 49–31	8,164	
October 10	6:00 p.m.	**Temple**	**Navy**	Navy–Marine Corps Memorial Stadium • Annapolis, MD	CBSSN	**NAVY** 31–29	4,400	
October 10	7:00 p.m.	**East Carolina**	**South Florida**	Raymond James Stadium • Tampa, FL	ESPN+	**ECU** 44–24	6,799	
^{#}Rankings from AP Poll released prior to game. All times are in Eastern Time.

Date	Bye Week				
October 10	Cincinnati	Memphis	SMU	Tulsa	UCF

==== Week Seven ====
Date	Time	Visiting team	Home team	Site	TV	Result	Attendance	Ref.
October 16	6:00 p.m.	**No. 17 SMU**	**Tulane**	Yulman Stadium • New Orleans, LA	ESPN2	**SMU** 37–34 ^{OT}	0	
October 16	9:30 p.m.	No. 14 BYU	**Houston**	TDECU Stadium • Houston, TX	ESPN2	**L** 43–26	10,092	
October 17	12:00 p.m.	**Navy**	**East Carolina**	Dowdy–Ficklen Stadium • Greenville, NC	ESPN2	**NAVY** 27–23	3,500	
October 17	12:00 p.m.	**USF**	**Temple**	Lincoln Financial Field • Philadelphia, PA	ESPN+	**TEM** 29–27	782	
October 17	3:30 p.m.	**UCF**	**Memphis**	Liberty Bowl Memorial Stadium • Memphis, TN	ABC	**MEM** 50–49	10,554	
^{#}Rankings from AP Poll released prior to game. All times are in Eastern Time.

Date	Bye Week	
October 17	Cincinnati	Tulsa

==== Week Eight ====
Date	Time	Visiting team	Home team	Site	TV	Result	Attendance	Ref.
October 23	7:30 p.m.	**Tulsa**	**South Florida**	Raymond James Stadium • Tampa, FL	ESPN	**TLSA** 42–13	5,142	
October 24	12:00 p.m.	**Temple**	**Memphis**	Liberty Bowl Memorial Stadium • Memphis, TN	ESPN+	**MEM** 41–29	10,321	
October 24	2:00 p.m.	**Tulane**	**UCF**	Bounce House • Orlando, FL	ESPN2	**UCF** 51–34	9,148	
October 24	3:30 p.m.	**Houston**	**Navy**	Navy–Marine Corps Memorial Stadium • Annapolis, MD	CBSSN	**HOU** 37–21	3,600	
October 24	9:00 p.m.	**No. 9 Cincinnati**	**No. 16 SMU**	Gerald J. Ford Stadium • Dallas, TX	ESPN2	**CIN** 42–13	7,898	
^{#}Rankings from AP Poll released prior to game. All times are in Eastern Time.

Date	Bye Week
October 24	East Carolina

==== Week Nine ====
Date	Time	Visiting team	Home team	Site	TV	Result	Attendance	Ref.
October 30	9:00 p.m.	**East Carolina**	**Tulsa**	H. A. Chapman Stadium • Tulsa, OK	ESPN2	**TLSA** 34–30	0	
October 31	12:00 p.m.	**Memphis**	**No. 7 Cincinnati**	Nippert Stadium • Cincinnati, OH (rivalry)	ESPN	**CIN** 49–10	0	
October 31	12:00 p.m.	**Temple**	**Tulane**	Yulman Stadium • New Orleans, LA	ESPN+	**TULN** 38–3	1,200	
October 31	2:00 p.m.	**UCF**	**Houston**	TDECU Stadium • Houston, TX	ESPN+	**UCF** 44–21	8,630	
October 31	7:30 p.m.	**Navy**	**No. 22 SMU**	Gerald R. Ford Stadium • University Park, TX (Gansz Trophy)	ESPN2	**SMU** 51–37	7,898	
^{#}Rankings from AP Poll released prior to game. All times are in Eastern Time.

Date	Bye Week
October 31	South Florida

==== Week Ten ====
Date	Time	Visiting team	Home team	Site	TV	Result	Attendance	Ref.
November 7	12:00 p.m.	**No. 18 SMU**	**Temple**	Lincoln Financial Field • Philadelphia, PA	ESPN+	**SMU** 47–23	2,577	
November 7	12:00 p.m.	**South Florida**	**Memphis**	Liberty Bowl Memorial Stadium • Memphis, TN	ESPN+	**MEM** 34–33	10,300	
November 7	12:00 p.m.	**Tulane**	**East Carolina**	Dowdy–Ficklen Stadium • Greenville, NC	ESPN+	**TULN** 38–21	3,500	
November 7	3:30 p.m.	**Houston**	**No. 6 Cincinnati**	Nippert Stadium • Cincinnati, OH	ABC	**CIN** 38–10	0	
^{#}Rankings from AP Poll released prior to game. All times are in Eastern Time.

Date	Bye Week		
November 7	Navy	Tulsa	UCF

==== Week Eleven ====
Date	Time	Visiting team	Home team	Site	TV	Result	Attendance	Ref.
November 13	7:30 p.m.	**East Carolina**	**No. 7 Cincinnati**	Nippert Stadium • Cincinnati, OH	ESPN2	**CIN** 55–17	0	
November 14	12:00 p.m.	Army	**Tulane**	Yulman Stadium • New Orleans, LA	ESPN2	**W** 38–12	1,200	
November 14	3:30 p.m.	**South Florida**	**Houston**	TDECU Stadium • Tampa, FL	ESPN2	**HOU** 56–21	8,266	
November 14	7:00 p.m.	**No. 19 SMU**	**Tulsa**	H. A. Chapman Stadium • Tulsa, OK	ESPN2	**TLSA** 28–24	3,900	
November 14	7:30 p.m.	**Temple**	**UCF**	Bounce House • Orlando, FL	ESPNU	**UCF** 38–13	8,768	
^{#}Rankings from AP Poll released prior to game. All times are in Eastern Time.

Date	Bye Week	
November 14	Memphis	Navy

==== Week Twelve ====
Date	Time	Visiting team	Home team	Site	TV	Result	Attendance	Ref.
November 19	7:30 p.m.	**Tulane**	**No. 25 Tulsa**	H. A. Chapman Stadium • Tulsa, OK	ESPN	**TLSA** 30–24 ^{2OT}		
November 21	12:00 p.m.	**East Carolina**	**Temple**	Lincoln Financial Field • Philadelphia, PA	ESPN+	**ECU** 28–3		
November 21	12:00 p.m.	Stephen F. Austin	**Memphis**	Liberty Bowl Memorial Stadium • Memphis, TN	ESPN+	**W** 56–14	9,684	
November 21	3:30 p.m.	**No. 7 Cincinnati**	**UCF**	Bounce House • Orlando, FL	ESPN	**CIN** 36–33	10,668	
^{#}Rankings from AP Poll released prior to game. All times are in Eastern Time.

Date	Bye Week			
November 21	Houston	Navy	SMU	South Florida

==== Week Thirteen ====
Date	Time	Visiting team	Home team	Site	TV	Result	Attendance	Ref.
November 27	3:30 p.m.	**UCF**	**South Florida**	Raymond James Stadium • Tampa, FL (War on I-4)	ESPN	**UCF** 58–46	8,801	
November 28	12:00 p.m.	**SMU**	**East Carolina**	Dowdy–Ficklen Stadium • Greenville, NC	ESPN+	**ECU** 52–38	3,500	
November 28	7:00 p.m.	**Memphis**	**Navy**	Navy–Marine Corps Memorial Stadium • Annapolis, MD	CBS Sports Network	**MEM** 10–7	0	
^{#}Rankings from AP Poll released prior to game. All times are in Eastern Time.

Date	Bye Week				
November 28	Cincinnati	Houston	Temple	Tulane	Tulsa

==== Week Fourteen ====
Date	Time	Visiting team	Home team	Site	TV	Result	Attendance	Ref.
December 5	12:00 p.m.	**Memphis**	**Tulane**	Yulman Stadium • New Orleans, LA	ESPN+	**TULN** 35–21	2,400	
December 5	3:30 p.m.	**No. 24 Tulsa**	**Navy**	Navy–Marine Corps Memorial Stadium • Annapolis, MD	ESPN2	**TLSA** 19–6		
^{#}Rankings from AP Poll released prior to game. All times are in Eastern Time.

Date	Bye Week						
December 5	Cincinnati	East Carolina	Houston	SMU	South Florida	Temple	UCF

==== Week Fifteen ====
Date	Time	Visiting team	Home team	Site	TV	Result	Attendance	Ref.
December 12	3:00 p.m.	**Navy**	Army	Michie Stadium • West Point, NY (121st Army-Navy Game/Commander-in-Chief's Trophy)	CBS	**L** 0–15	12,722	
December 12	3:30 p.m.	**Houston**	**Memphis**	Liberty Bowl Memorial Stadium • Memphis, TN	ESPN2	**MEM** 27–30	9,475	
^{#}Rankings from AP Poll released prior to game. All times are in Eastern Time.

Date	Bye Week	
December 12	Cincinnati	Tulsa

=== Championship game ===
Date	Time	Visiting team	Home team	Site	TV	Result	Attendance	Ref.
December 19	8:00 p.m.	No. 23 **Tulsa**	No. 9 **Cincinnati**	Nippert Stadium • Cincinnati, OH	ABC	**CIN** 27–24	5,831	
^{#}Rankings from AP Poll released prior to game. All times are in Eastern Time.

== Postseason ==
For the 2020–2025 bowl cycle, The American will annually send teams to the Military Bowl, Fenway Bowl, and a third annual spot alternating between the Armed Forces Bowl and Hawaii Bowl annually. The American will have annually four appearances in the following bowls: Birmingham Bowl, Gasparilla Bowl, Boca Raton Bowl, Frisco Bowl, Cure Bowl, First Responder Bowl, Myrtle Beach Bowl and New Mexico Bowl. The American champion will go to a New Year's Six bowl if a team finishes higher than the champions of Group of Five conferences in the final College Football Playoff rankings. American teams are also eligible for the College Football Playoff if they're among the top four teams in the final CFP ranking.

=== Bowl games ===
==== Cancelled bowls ====
The following annual bowl games tied in with the American Athletic Conference had their 2020 editions canceled :

- Frisco Bowl scheduled for December 19 between SMU and UTSA was canceled due to COVID-19 complications within the SMU program. As a result, UTSA accepted a bid to the First Responder Bowl.
- Military Bowl and Birmingham Bowl were canceled due to a lack of available teams to play.

Legend
American win
American loss

Bowl game	Date	Site	Television	Time (EST)	AAC team	Opponent	Score
Famous Idaho Potato Bowl	December 22	Albertsons Stadium, Boise, ID	ESPN	3:30 p.m.	Tulane	Nevada	27–38
Boca Raton Bowl	December 22	FAU Stadium, Boca Raton, FL	ESPN	7:00 p.m.	UCF	BYU	23–49
Montgomery Bowl	December 23	Cramton Bowl, Montgomery, AL	ESPN	7:00 p.m.	Memphis	Florida Atlantic	25–10
New Mexico Bowl	December 24	Toyota Stadium, Frisco, TX	ESPN	3:30 p.m.	Houston	Hawaii	14–28
Armed Forces Bowl	December 31	Amon G. Carter Stadium, Ft. Worth, TX	ESPN	12:00 p.m.	No. 24 Tulsa	Mississippi State	26–28
**New Year's Six bowl game**
Peach Bowl	Jan. 1, 2021	Mercedes-Benz Stadium, Atlanta, Georgia	ESPN	12:30 p.m.	No. 8 Cincinnati	No. 9 Georgia	21–24

Rankings are from CFP rankings. All times Eastern Time Zone. American teams shown in bold.

== American vs other conferences ==
=== American vs Power 5 matchups ===
The following games include American teams competing against Power Five conferences teams from the (ACC, Big Ten, Big 12, Pac-12, Notre Dame, BYU and SEC). Due to the COVID-19 pandemic, most power five games for the American have been canceled, All of the Power Five conferences initially announced that they would go on with their season as scheduled, but with cuts to non-conference games in order to overcome logistical concerns and reduce travel. The Big Ten, Pac-12, and SEC were all limiting play to in-conference opponents only. The ACC and Big 12 are allowing one non-conference game each. The Big Ten and Pac 12 have postponed fall sports due to COVID-19 concerns.

Date	Conference	Visitor	Home	Site	Score
September 7	Independent	BYU	Navy	Navy–Marine Corps Memorial Stadium • Annapolis, MD	55–3
September 19	Big 12	Tulsa	Oklahoma State	Boone Pickens Stadium • Stillwater, OK	16–7
September 19	ACC	UCF	Georgia Tech	Bobby Dodd Stadium • Atlanta, GA	49–21
September 19	ACC	South Florida	Notre Dame	Notre Dame Stadium • South Bend, IN	52–0
October 16	Independent	BYU	Houston	TDECU Stadium • Houston, TX	46–23

=== American vs Group of Five matchups ===
The following games include American teams competing against teams from C-USA, MAC, Mountain West or Sun Belt. On August 8, the MAC announced the postponement of all fall sports for the 2020 season, including football. On August 10, the Mountain West followed the MAC as the second Group of Five conference to postpone fall sports indefinitely. On August 10, Rice announced it was the delaying the start of it season until September 26.

Date	Conference	Visitor	Home	Site	Score
September 5	Sun Belt	SMU	Texas State	Bobcat Stadium • San Marcos, TX	31–24
September 5	Sun Belt	Arkansas State	Memphis	Liberty Bowl Memorial Stadium • Memphis, TN	37–24
September 12	Sun Belt	Tulane	South Alabama	Hancock Whitney Stadium • Mobile, AL	27–24
September 19	C-USA	SMU	North Texas	Apogee Stadium • Denton, TX	65–35
September 26	C-USA	Tulane	Southern Miss	M.M Roberts Stadium • Hattiesburg, MS	66–24
October 3	Sun Belt	East Carolina	Georgia State	Center Parc Stadium • Atlanta, GA	29–49
October 3	MWC	Navy	Air Force	Falcon Stadium • Colorado Springs, CO	7–40

=== American vs FBS independents matchups ===
The following games include American teams competing against FBS Independents which include Army, Liberty, New Mexico State, UConn and UMass. UConn, announced that they would opt out of the 2020 season. UMass announced that they would opt of playing fall football and hopes to construct a season in spring 2021. New Mexico State announced that they would opt out of playing fall football and try to play in spring 2021.

Date	Visitor	Home	Site	Score
September 26	Army	Cincinnati	Nippert Stadium • Cincinnati, OH	24–10
November 14	Army	Tulane	Yulman Stadium • New Orleans, LA	38–12
December 12	Navy	Army	Michie Stadium • West Point, NY	0–15

=== American vs FCS matchups ===
The Football Championship Subdivision comprises 13 conferences and two independent programs. All conferences and teams have postponed their fall conference schedules, The Big South, (James Madison, Elon, Villanova from the CAA), Missouri Valley Football Conference, Ohio Valley Conference, SoCon, and Southland Conference are allowing the option of playing out-of-conference games only

Date	Visitor	Home	Site	Score
September 12	The Citadel	South Florida	Raymond James Stadium • Tampa, FL	27–6
September 19	Austin Peay	Cincinnati	Nippert Stadium • Cincinnati, OH	55–20
September 19	Stephen F. Austin	SMU	Gerald J. Ford Stadium • University Park, TX	50–7
November 21	Stephen F. Austin	Memphis	Liberty Bowl Memorial Stadium • Memphis, TN	56–14

=== Records against other conferences ===
Regular Season

Power 5 Conferences	Record
ACC	1–1
Big Ten	—
Big 12	0–1
Pac-12	—
SEC	—
Power 5 Total	1–2
Other FBS Conferences	Record
BYU	0–2
C–USA	2–0
Independents (Excludes BYU & Notre Dame)	2–1
MAC	—
Mountain West	0–1
Sun Belt	3–1
Other FBS Total	7–5
FCS Opponents	Record
Football Championship Subdivision	4–0
Total Non-Conference Record	12–7

Post Season

Power Conferences 5	Record
ACC	—
Big Ten	—
Big 12	—
Pac-12	—
SEC	0–2
Power 5 Total	0–2
Other FBS Conferences	Record
BYU	0–1
C–USA	1–0
Independents (Excluding BYU & Notre Dame)	—
MAC	—
Mountain West	0–2
Sun Belt	—
Other FBS Total	1–3
Total Bowl Record	1–5

== Awards and honors ==
=== Player of the week honors ===
Week	Offensive			Defensive			Specialist		
Week	Player	Team	Position	Player	Team	Position	Player	Team	Position
WEEK 1 & WEEK 2 (Sept. 12)	Brady White	Memphis	QB	Cameron Sample	Tulane	DE	Chris Naggar	SMU	K
WEEK 3 (Sept. 19)	Dillon Gabriel	UCF	QB	Diego Fagot	Navy	LB	Bijan Nichols; Chris Naggar (2)	Navy; SMU	K K
WEEK 4 (Sept. 26)	Dillon Gabriel (2)	UCF	QB	Jarell White	Cincinnati	LB	Daniel Obarski	UCF	K
WEEK 5 (Oct. 3)	Shane Buechele	SMU	QB	Zaven Collins	Tulsa	LB	Chris Naggar (3); Lachlan Wilson	SMU; Tulsa	K P
WEEK 6 (Oct. 10)	Marquez Stevenson	Houston	WR	Terrell Adams	Navy	LB	Jake Verity	East Carolina	K
WEEK 7 (Oct. 17)	Dillon Gabriel (3); Brady White (2)	UCF; Memphis	QB; QB	Arnold Ebiketie	Temple	DE	Chris Naggar (4)	SMU	K
WEEK 8 (Oct. 24)	Desmond Ridder	Cincinnati	QB	Zaven Collins (2)	Tulsa	LB	Dalton Witherspoon	Houston	K
WEEK 9 (Oct. 31)	Desmond Ridder (2)	Cincinnati	QB	Myjai Sanders	Cincinnati	DE	Daniel Obarski (2)	UCF	K
WEEK 10 (Nov. 7)	Brady White (3)	Memphis	QB	Patrick Johnson	Tulane	DE	Spencer Shrader	South Florida	K
WEEK 11 (Nov. 14)	Desmond Ridder (3)	Cincinnati	QB	Jarell White (2); Zaven Collins (3)	Cincinnati; Tulsa	LB; LB	Marcus Jones	Houston	PR
WEEK 12 (Nov. 21)	Desmond Ridder (4); Davis Brin	Cincinnati; Tulsa	QB; QB	Zaven Collins (4)	Tulsa	LB	Tyler Snead	East Carolina	KR
WEEK 13 (Nov. 28)	Holton Ahlers	East Carolina	QB	Quindell Johnson	Memphis	S	Riley Patterson	Memphis	K
WEEK 14 (Dec. 5)	Michael Pratt	Tulane	QB	Jaxon Player	Tulsa	DT	Zack Long	Tulsa	K

=== American Athletic Individual Awards ===
The following individuals received postseason honors as chosen by the league's head coaches.

Award	Player	School
Offensive Player of the Year	Desmond Ridder, QB	Cincinnati
Defensive Player of the Year	Zaven Collins, LB	Tulsa
Special Teams Player of the Year	Chris Naggar, K	SMU
Rookies of the Year	Rahjai Harris; Ulysses Bentley IV	East Carolina; SMU
Coach of the Year	Luke Fickell	Cincinnati

=== All-Conference Teams ===
Position	Player	Team
First Team Offense
WR	Jaylon Robinson	UCF
WR	Marlon Williams	UCF
WR	Calvin Austin	Memphis
OT	James Hudson	Cincinnati
OT	Tyler Smith	Tulsa
OG	Cole Schneider	UCF
OG	Peter Nestrowitz	Navy
C	Matthew Lee	UCF
TE	Kylen Granson	SMU
QB	Desmond Ridder	Cincinnati
RB	Gerrid Doaks	Cincinnati
RB	Rahjai Harris	East Carolina
RB	Ulysses Bentley IV	SMU
First Team Defense
DL	Myjai Sanders	Cincinnati
DL	O’Bryan Goodson	Memphis
DL	Cameron Sample	Tulane
DL	Jaxon Player	Tulsa
LB	Jarell White	Cincinnati
LB	Grant Stuard	Houston
LB	Patrick Johnson	Tulane
LB	Zaven Collins *	Tulsa
CB	Sauce Gardner	Cincinnati
CB	Coby Bryant	Cincinnati
S	Richie Grant *	UCF
S	James Wiggins	Cincinnati
First Team Special Teams
K	Chris Naggar	SMU
P	Ryan Wright	Tulane
RS	Marcus Jones	Houston

Position	Player	Team
Second Team Offense
WR	Michael Young Jr.	Cincinnati
WR	Tyler Snead	East Carolina
WR	Keylon Stokes	Tulsa
OT	Jaylon Thomas	SMU
OT	Chris Paul	Tulsa
OG	Hayden Howerton	SMU
OG	Corey Dublin	Tulane
C	Sincere Haynesworth	Tulane
TE	Josh Whyle	Cincinnati
QB	Dillon Gabriel	UCF
RB	Otis Anderson Jr.	UCF
RB	Stephon Huderson	Tulane
Second Team Defense
DL	Marcus Brown	Cincinnati
DL	Elijah Ponder	Cincinnati
DL	Payton Turner	Houston
DL	Arnold Ebiketie	Temple
LB	Darrian Beavers	Cincinnati
LB	Diego Fagot	Navy
LB	Antonio Grier	South Florida
LB	Dorian Williams	Tulane
LB	Justin Wright	Tulsa
CB	Aaron Robinson	UCF
CB	Ja’Quan McMillian	East Carolina
S	Quindell Johnson	Memphis
S	Cristian Williams	Tulsa
Second Team Special Teams
K	Zack Long	Tulsa
P	James Smith	Cincinnati
RS	Tre Tucker	Cincinnati
RS	Tyler Snead	East Carolina

* Denotes Unanimous Selection

All Conference Honorable Mentions:

- UCF: Lokahi Pauole (OG)
- Cincinnati: Darrick Forrest (S), Darius Harper (OT)
- ECU: Xavier Smith (LB)
- Houston: Braylon Jones (OG), Damarion Williams (CB)
- Memphis: Sean Dykes (TE), Morris Joseph (DL)
- SMU: Richard McBryde (LB)
- Temple: Jadan Blue (WR)
- Tulane: Joey Claybrook (OT)
- Tulsa: Dante Bivens (OG), Dylan Couch (OG), Allie Green IV (CB), Kendarin Ray (S), Gerard Wheeler (C)

=== All-Americans ===
The 2020 College Football All-America Team is composed of the following College Football All-American first teams chosen by the following selector organizations: Associated Press (AP), Football Writers Association of America (FWAA), American Football Coaches Association (AFCA), Walter Camp Foundation (WCFF), The Sporting News (TSN), Sports Illustrated (SI), USA Today (USAT) ESPN, CBS Sports (CBS), FOX Sports (FOX) College Football News (CFN), Bleacher Report (BR), Scout.com, Phil Steele (PS), SB Nation (SB), Athlon Sports, Pro Football Focus (PFF), The Athletic, and Yahoo! Sports (Yahoo!).

Currently, the NCAA compiles consensus all-America teams in the sports of Division I-FBS football and Division I men's basketball using a point system computed from All-America teams named by coaches associations or media sources. The system consists of three points for a first-team honor, two points for second-team honor, and one point for third-team honor. Honorable mention and fourth team or lower recognitions are not accorded any points. Football consensus teams are compiled by position and the player accumulating the most points at each position is named first team consensus all-American. Currently, the NCAA recognizes All-Americans selected by the AP, AFCA, FWAA, TSN, and the WCFF to determine Consensus and Unanimous All-Americans. Any player named to the First Team by all five of the NCAA-recognized selectors is deemed a Unanimous All-American.

Position	Player	School	Selector	Unanimous	Consensus
First Team All-Americans
LB	Zaven Collins	Tulsa	AFCA, AP, ESPN, FWAA, TSN, WCFF	*	
DB	Sauce Gardner	Cincinnati	AFCA, AP, FWAA, TSN, WCFF		
KR	Marcus Jones	Houston	AFCA, AP, FWAA, TSN, WCFF		

Position	Player	School	Selector	Unanimous	Consensus
Second Team All-Americans
LB	Zaven Collins	Tulsa	PS		
DB	Sauce Gardner	Cincinnati	PS, USAT		
DB	James Wiggins	Houston	Athletic		

*CBS Sports All-America Team
*ESPN All-America Team
*The Athletic All-America Team
*USA Today All-America Team
*AP All-America Team
*The Sporting News All-America Team
*Football Writers' Association of America All-America Team
*American Football Coaches Association All-America Team
*2020 Walter Camp Football Foundation All-America Team
*Phil Steele All-America Team

=== National award winners ===
Lombardi Award (top player):
Zaven Collins, Tulsa

Campbell Trophy ("academic Heisman")
Brady White, Memphis

Bronko Nagurski Trophy (Best Defensive Player)
Zaven Collins, Tulsa

Chuck Bednarik Award (defensive player)
Zaven Collins, Tulsa

== NFL draft ==
The following list includes all AAC players who were drafted in the 2021 NFL draft.

Player	Position	School	Draft Round	Round Pick	Overall Pick	Team
Zaven Collins	LB	Tulsa	1	16	16	Arizona Cardinals
Payton Turner	DE	Houston	1	28	28	New Orleans Saints
Richie Grant	S	UCF	2	8	40	Atlanta Falcons
Aaron Robinson	CB	UCF	3	7	71	New York Giants
Brandon Stephens	CB	SMU	3	40	104	Baltimore Ravens
James Hudson	OT	Cincinnati	4	5	110	Cleveland Browns
Cameron Sample	DE	Tulane	4	6	111	Cincinnati Bengals
Kylen Granson	TE	SMU	4	22	127	Indianapolis Colts
D'Ante Smith	OT	East Carolina	4	34	139	Cincinnati Bengals
Jacob Harris	WR	UCF	4	36	141	Los Angeles Rams
Kenneth Gainwell	RB	Memphis	5	6	150	Philadelphia Eagles
Darrick Forrest	S	Cincinnati	5	19	163	Washington Football Team
Marquez Stevenson	WR	Houston	6	19	203	Buffalo Bills
Tay Gowan	CB	UCF	6	39	223	Arizona Cardinals
Patrick Johnson	DE	Tulane	7	6	234	Philadelphia Eagles
Tre Nixon	WR	UCF	7	14	242	New England Patriots
James Wiggins	S	Cincinnati	7	15	243	Arizona Cardinals
Gerrid Doaks	RB	Cincinnati	7	16	244	Miami Dolphins
Grant Stuard	LB	Houston	7	31	259	Tampa Bay Buccaneers
