= 2020 Camellia Bowl =

Postseason college football bowl game

- 7th Camellia Bowl
Marshall Thundering Herd	Buffalo Bulls
(7–2)	(5–1)
C–USA	MAC
10	17
Head coach: Doc Holliday	Head coach: Lance Leipold
	1	2	3	4	Total
Marshall	0	7	3	0	10
Buffalo	0	10	0	7	17
- Date: December 25, 2020
- Season: 2020
- Stadium: Cramton Bowl
- Location: Montgomery, Alabama
- MVP: Kevin Marks (RB, Buffalo)
- Favorite: Buffalo by 4.5
- Referee: Edwin Lee (The American)
- Attendance: 2,512

United States TV coverage
- Network: ESPN
- Announcers: Bill Roth (play-by-play), Dustin Fox (analyst) and Lauren Sisler (sideline)

The 2020 Camellia Bowl was a college football bowl game played on December 25, 2020, at the Cramton Bowl in Montgomery, Alabama, with kickoff at 2:30 p.m. EST on ESPN. It was the seventh edition of the Camellia Bowl, and was one of the 2020–21 bowl games concluding the 2020 FBS football season. Buffalo defeated Marshall, 17–10, to claim their second bowl victory in school history.

This was first bowl game played on Christmas Day since the 2003 Hawaii Bowl. Christmas Day college football had previously been played at the Cramton Bowl from 1979 to 2001 in the form of the Blue-Gray Football Classic. It was one of two bowl games, along with the one-off Montgomery Bowl, that were played at the Cramton Bowl following the 2020 college football season.

== Teams ==
The Camellia Bowl was contested by the Buffalo Bulls, from the Mid-American Conference (MAC), and the Marshall Thundering Herd, from Conference USA (C-USA). The programs had previously met nine times, with Marshall leading the series, 8–1; their most recent meeting had been a 48–14 win by Marshall in 2004. This was the programs' first meeting in a bowl game, and the first Camellia Bowl for both teams.

=== Buffalo ===
Buffalo of the MAC accepted their bowl bid on December 20, 2020. The Bulls entered the bowl with an overall record of 5–1 (5–0 in conference play). They won the MAC East division and competed in the MAC Championship Game, where they lost to Ball State.

=== Marshall ===
Marshall from C-USA accepted their bowl bid on December 20, 2020. The Thundering Herd entered the bowl with an overall record of 7–2 (4–1 in conference play); they were ranked at number 15 in the AP Poll at the end of November.

== Game summary ==
2020 Camellia Bowl

Quarter	1	2	3	4	Total
Marshall	0	7	3	0	10
Buffalo	0	10	0	7	17

at Cramton Bowl • Montgomery, Alabama

- Date: Saturday, December 25, 2020
- Game time: 2:30 p.m. EST (1:30 p.m. CST)
- Game weather: Sunny • Temperature: 41 °F (5 °C) • Wind: W 13 mph
- Referee: Edwin Lee (The American)
- TV announcers (ESPN): Bill Roth (play-by-play), Dustin Fox (analyst) and Lauren Sisler (sideline)
- ESPN game summary

Game information

First quarter
No scoring plays
Second quarter

- (11:43) UB – Kyle Vantrease 1 yard rush, Alex McNulty kick (Drive: 11 plays, 80 yards, 5:31; Buffalo 7–0)
- (5:33) UB – Alex McNulty 25 yard field goal (Drive: 10 plays, 37 yards, 4:20; Buffalo 10–0)
- (0:42) MRSH – Knowledge McDaniel 2 yard rush, Shane Ciucci kick (Drive: 12 plays, 75 yards, 4:51; Buffalo 10–7)

Third quarter

- (8:48) MRSH – Shane Ciucci 21 yard field goal (Drive: 15 plays, 60 yards, 6:12; Tied 10–10)

Fourth quarter

- (1:09) UB – Kevin Marks 2 yard rush, Alex McNulty kick (Drive: 13 plays, 88 yards, 6:18; Buffalo 17–10)

=== Statistics ===
Statistics	MRSH	UB
First downs	16	21
Plays–yards	59–248	70–295
Rushes–yards	37–134	43–155
Passing yards	114	140
Passing: comp–att–int	13–22–0	16–27–1
Time of possession	24:33	35:27

Team	Category	Player	Statistics
Marshall	Passing	Grant Wells	13/20, 114 yards
Marshall	Rushing	Sheldon Evans	18 carries, 79 yards
Marshall	Receiving	Corey Gammage	6 receptions, 88 yards
Buffalo	Passing	Kyle Vantrease	16/27, 140 yards, 1 INT
Buffalo	Rushing	Kevin Marks	35 carries, 138 yards, 1 TD
Buffalo	Receiving	Jovany Ruiz	7 receptions, 61 yards

== See also ==
- 2020 Montgomery Bowl, held at the same venue
