= Aaron Robinson (American football) =

American football player (born 1997)

Profile
- Position: Cornerback

Personal information
- Born: November 10, 1997 (age 28); Deerfield Beach, Florida, U.S.
- Listed height: 6 ft 0 in (1.83 m)
- Listed weight: 195 lb (88 kg)

Career information
- High school: Deerfield Beach
- College: Alabama (2016); UCF (2017–2020)
- NFL draft: 2021: 3rd round, 71st overall pick

Career history
- New York Giants (2021–2023)

Awards and highlights
- Colley Matrix national champion (2017); 2× Second-team All-AAC (2019, 2020)

Career NFL statistics as of 2023
- Total tackles: 32
- Pass deflections: 4
- Stats at Pro Football Reference

Aaron Robinson (born November 10, 1997) is an American professional football cornerback. He played college football at Alabama and UCF, and was selected by the New York Giants in the third round of the 2021 NFL draft.

== Early life ==
Robinson grew up in Deerfield Beach, Florida, and attended Deerfield Beach High School. He finished his senior season with 41 tackles, four interceptions and four pass break-ups and was named first-team All-Class 8A. He was a four-star recruit, per ESPN. Robinson initially committed to play college football at Florida before flipping his commitment to Alabama shortly before National Signing Day.

== College career ==
Robinson began his collegiate career at Alabama. He played in 13 games as a true freshman as a reserve cornerback and on special teams. Robinson announced that he intended to transfer from Alabama during the summer before his sophomore year and ultimately chose to enroll at UCF.

Robinson sat out his first year with the Knights per NCAA transfer rules. He suffered a serious injury on the opening kickoff of his first game with the team and missed multiple weeks of his redshirt sophomore season. As a redshirt junior, Robinson recorded 54 tackles, 5.5 tackles for loss, three interceptions and 10 pass breakups with one forced fumble and was named second-team All-American Athletic Conference (AAC). Robinson was named second-team All-AAC again as a redshirt senior.

== Professional career ==
Pre-draft measurables
Height	Weight	Arm length	Hand span	40-yard dash	10-yard split	20-yard split	20-yard shuttle	Three-cone drill	Vertical jump	Broad jump	Bench press
5 ft 11 1/2 in (1.82 m)	186 lb (84 kg)	30 1/4 in (0.77 m)	8 3/4 in (0.22 m)	4.38 s	1.58 s	2.46 s	4.31 s	6.90 s	37.0 in (0.94 m)	10 ft 3 in (3.12 m)	15 reps
All values from Pro Day

Robinson was selected by the New York Giants in the third round (71st overall) of the 2021 NFL draft. He signed his four-year rookie contract with New York on May 27, 2021. He was placed on the reserve/physically unable to perform (PUP) list to start the 2021 season. He was activated on November 1, 2021.

On September 14, 2022, Robinson had his appendix removed and would not be able to play in Week 2 & 3 games against the Carolina Panthers and Dallas Cowboys. On October 4, 2022, Robinson was placed on injured reserve with a knee injury.

Robinson was placed on the reserve/PUP list to start the 2023 season as he recovered from his knee injury.

Robinson was waived by the Giants on July 31, 2024 following a failed physical.
