= 2020 Montgomery Bowl =

Postseason college football bowl game

- 1st Montgomery Bowl
| Memphis Tigers | Florida Atlantic Owls |
| (7–3) | (5–3) |
| The American | C-USA |
| 25 | 10 |
| Head coach: Ryan Silverfield | Head coach: Willie Taggart |
| | 1 | 2 | 3 | 4 | Total |
|---|---|---|---|---|---|
| Memphis | 10 | 8 | 7 | 0 | 25 |
| Florida Atlantic | 0 | 0 | 10 | 0 | 10 |
- Date: December 23, 2020
- Season: 2020
- Stadium: Cramton Bowl
- Location: Montgomery, Alabama
- MVP: Brady White (QB, Memphis)
- Favorite: Memphis by 9
- Referee: Marshall Lewis (Sun Belt)
- Attendance: 2979

United States TV coverage
- Network: ESPN
- Announcers: Clay Matvick (play-by-play), Rocky Boiman (analyst), Lauren Sisler (sideline)

International TV coverage
- Network: ESPN Deportes

The 2020 Montgomery Bowl was a college football bowl game played on December 23, 2020, at the Cramton Bowl in Montgomery, Alabama. The game was broadcast on ESPN, with kickoff at 7:00 p.m. EST (6:00 p.m. local CST). It was the inaugural, and potentially only, (Note: The Montgomery Bowl was announced in late October 2020, with organizers indicating that it was a "substitute of the Fenway Bowl for this season only.") edition of the Montgomery Bowl. It was one of two bowl games, along with the Camellia Bowl, that were played at the Cramton Bowl following the 2020 FBS football season.

== Teams ==
The 2020 Montgomery Bowl was contested by the Florida Atlantic Owls, from Conference USA, and the Memphis Tigers, from the American Athletic Conference ("The American"). The two teams met once previously; the Owls defeated the Tigers in the 2007 New Orleans Bowl, 44–27.

=== Memphis ===
Memphis of The American entered the bowl with an overall record of 7–3 (5–3 in conference play); they were ranked as high as number 16 in the AP Poll early in the season.

=== Florida Atlantic ===
Florida Atlantic of C–USA entered the bowl with an overall record of 5–3 (4–2 in conference play).

== Game summary ==
2020 Montgomery Bowl

| Quarter | 1 | 2 | 3 | 4 | Total |
|---|---|---|---|---|---|
| Memphis | 10 | 8 | 7 | 0 | 25 |
| Florida Atlantic | 0 | 0 | 10 | 0 | 10 |

at Cramton Bowl • Montgomery, Alabama

- Date: Wednesday, December 23, 2020
- Game time: 7:00 p.m. EST (6:00 p.m. CST)
- Game weather: Rain • Temperature: 58 °F (14 °C) • Wind: ESE 8 mph
- Referee: Marshall Lewis (Sun Belt)
- TV announcers (ESPN): Clay Matvick (play-by-play), Rocky Boiman (analyst), Lauren Sisler (sideline)
- ESPN game summary

Game information

First quarter

- (7:15) MEM – Riley Patterson 53 yard field goal (Drive: 10 plays, 53 yards, 3:20; Memphis 3–0)
- (2:26) MEM – Javon Ivory 5 yard pass from Brady White, Riley Patterson kick (Drive: 8 plays, 52 yards, 3:18; Memphis 10–0)

Second quarter

- (0:22) MEM – Joseph Dorceus 2 yard pass from Brady White, John Hassell 2-point conversion rush (Drive: 10 plays, 58 yards, 4:25; Memphis 18–0)

Third quarter

- (9:53) FAU – TJ Chase 3 yard pass from Nick Tronti, Vladimir Rivas kick (Drive: 9 plays, 73 yards, 3:14; Memphis 18–7)
- (7:38) FAU – Vladimir Rivas 27 yard field goal (Drive: 7 plays, 16 yards, 2:15; Memphis 18–10)
- (5:14) MEM – Calvin Austin 7 yard pass from Brady White, Riley Patterson kick (Drive: 7 plays, 75 yards, 2:24; Memphis 25–10)

Fourth quarter
No scoring plays

=== Statistics ===
| Statistics | MEM | FAU |
|---|---|---|
| First downs | 24 | 19 |
| Plays–yards | 24–469 | 19–290 |
| Rushes–yards | 35–185 | 39–139 |
| Passing yards | 284 | 151 |
| Passing: comp–att–int | 22–34–1 | 19–35–1 |
| Time of possession | 26:54 | 29:16 |

| Team | Category | Player | Statistics |
|---|---|---|---|
| Memphis | Passing | Brady White | 22/34, 284 yards, 3 TD, 1 INT |
| Memphis | Rushing | Asa Martin | 15 carries, 96 yards |
| Memphis | Receiving | Javon Ivory | 7 receptions, 126 yards, 1 TD |
| Florida Atlantic | Passing | Nick Tronti | 16/32, 146 yards, 1 TD, 1 INT |
| Florida Atlantic | Rushing | James Charles | 16 carries, 82 yards |
| Florida Atlantic | Receiving | Brandon Robinson | 4 receptions, 39 yards |

== See also ==
- 2020 Camellia Bowl, held at the same venue
