= Calvin Austin =

American football player (born 1999)

Calvin Austin III
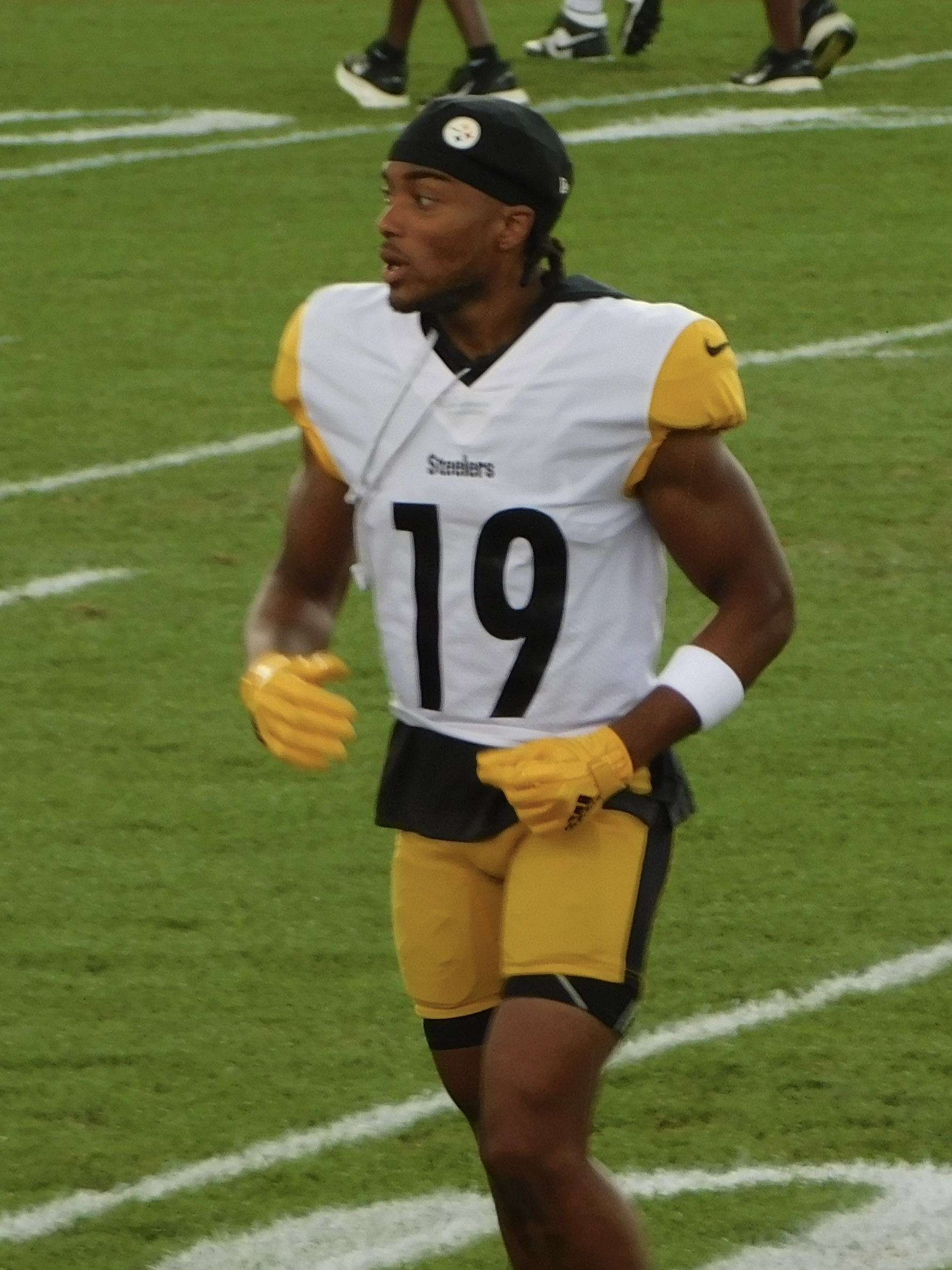
- Austin with the Pittsburgh Steelers in 2025

No. 82 – New York Giants
- Positions: Wide receiver, punt returner
- Roster status: Injured reserve

Personal information
- Born: March 24, 1999 (age 27); Memphis, Tennessee, U.S.
- Listed height: 5 ft 9 in (1.75 m)
- Listed weight: 162 lb (73 kg)

Career information
- High school: Harding Academy (Memphis)
- College: Memphis (2017–2021)
- NFL draft: 2022: 4th round, 138th overall pick

Career history
- Pittsburgh Steelers (2022–2025); New York Giants (2026–present)

Awards and highlights
- 2× First-team All-AAC (2020, 2021)

Career NFL statistics as of 2025
- Receptions: 84
- Receiving yards: 1,100
- Receiving touchdowns: 8
- Rushing yards: 57
- Return yards: 639
- Return touchdowns: 1
- Stats at Pro Football Reference

Calvin Austin III (born March 24, 1999) is an American professional football wide receiver and punt returner for the New York Giants of the National Football League (NFL). He played college football for the Memphis Tigers.

== Early life ==
Austin was born March 24, 1999, grew up in Memphis, Tennessee, and attended Harding Academy. His family consists of his father, Calvin Austin II, and mother, Mimi Austin, and his four sisters: Cami Bea, Claudia-Ruthie, Naomi Pearl, and Bella Rose.

== College career ==
Austin redshirted his true freshman season at Memphis after joining the team as a walk-on. During his redshirt sophomore season, he was awarded a scholarship and finished the year with 17 receptions for 315 yards and three touchdowns. As a redshirt junior, Austin caught 61 passes for 1,053 yards and 11 touchdowns and was named first-team All-American Athletic Conference (AAC). He repeated as a first-team All-AAC selection after finishing his redshirt senior season with 74 receptions for 1149 yards and eight touchdowns. After the conclusion of his college career, Austin was invited to play in the 2022 Senior Bowl. Austin is recognized as one of the best wide receivers in Memphis history, among other greats like Issac Bruce and Anthony Miller.

Austin also ran track at Memphis and was named a second-team All-American in 2019.

== Professional career ==
Pre-draft measurables
Height	Weight	Arm length	Hand span	Wingspan	40-yard dash	10-yard split	20-yard split	20-yard shuttle	Three-cone drill	Vertical jump	Broad jump	Bench press
5 ft 7 3/4 in (1.72 m)	170 lb (77 kg)	30 in (0.76 m)	9 1/4 in (0.23 m)	6 ft 1 in (1.85 m)	4.32 s	1.44 s	2.49 s	4.07 s	6.65 s	39.0 in (0.99 m)	11 ft 3 in (3.43 m)	11 reps
All values from NFL Combine/Pro Day

=== Pittsburgh Steelers ===
==== 2022 ====
Austin was selected by the Pittsburgh Steelers in the fourth round, 138th overall, of the 2022 NFL draft. He was placed on injured reserve on September 1, 2022 due to a foot injury. After Austin aggravated his injury, the Steelers let his return window pass and he was placed on season–ending injured reserve on October 26, 2022.

==== 2023 ====
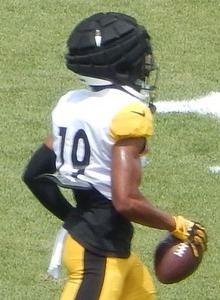
Austin during a practice in 2023 with the Steelers

Austin made the Steelers' 53-man roster to begin the 2023 season. In week 3 of the season against the Las Vegas Raiders, Austin caught his first NFL touchdown on a 72-yard deep pass from quarterback Kenny Pickett in a 23–18 Steelers victory. In week 16 against the Cincinnati Bengals, Austin scored his first rushing touchdown on a 7-yard run as the Steelers won 34–11. He finished his first full season with 17 receptions for 180 yards and one receiving touchdown to go with one rushing touchdown in 17 games and one start. In his postseason debut, Austin scored a receiving touchdown in the 31–17 loss to the Bills in the Wild Card Round.

==== 2024 ====
Austin, along with running back Cordarrelle Patterson, was named one of the team's kick returners ahead of the regular season. On September 22, 2024, Austin recorded a career-high 95 receiving yards against the Los Angeles Chargers. During the game, Austin caught four passes in total, one being a 55-yard touchdown catch from Justin Fields in the fourth quarter.

On October 28, 2024, Austin recorded his first career punt return touchdown, a 73-yard return, as well as his first career multi-touchdown game against the New York Giants, earning AFC Special Teams Player of the Week.

Austin finished the 2024 regular season with 36 catches on 58 targets for 548 yards and four touchdowns. Austin and the Steelers achieved a second consecutive postseason berth with a record of 10–7. During the AFC Wild Card playoff matchup with the Baltimore Ravens, Austin caught one pass for 25 yards and returned one punt for 14 yards. The Steelers lost the game 28–14, ending their 2024 campaign.

==== 2025 ====
Austin made his first appearance of the 2025 season catching four passes on six targets for 70 yards. He scored a touchdown on an 18-yard pass from Aaron Rodgers to give the Steelers a five-point lead over the New York Jets. The game ended in a narrow 34–32 Steelers victory. On January 4, 2026, Austin caught what would be the game-winning touchdown against the Baltimore Ravens securing the Steelers an AFC North Division title.

=== New York Giants ===
On March 14, 2026, Austin signed with the New York Giants on a one-year, $4.5 million contract. On August 25, Austin suffered a season-ending ACL tear and was placed on injured reserve.

== Career statistics ==
=== NFL ===
Year	Team	Games		Receiving					Rushing					Punt returns					Fumbles	
Year	Team	GP	GS	Rec	Yds	Avg	Lng	TD	Att	Yds	Avg	Lng	TD	Ret	Yds	Avg	Lng	TD	Fum	Lost
2022	PIT	Did not play due to injury																		
2023	PIT	17	1	17	180	10.6	72T	1	11	57	5.2	12	1	29	249	8.6	34	0	2	0
2024	PIT	17	8	36	548	15.2	55T	4	0	0	0.0	0	0	28	289	10.3	73T	1	1	1
2025	PIT	14	7	31	372	12.0	31	3	0	0	0.0	0	0	15	101	6.7	12	0	0	0
Career		48	16	84	1,100	13.1	72T	8	11	57	5.2	12	1	72	639	8.9	73T	1	3	1

=== College ===
Season	Team	GP	Receiving			Rushing			Punt return		
Season	Team	GP	Rec	Yds	TD	Att	Yds	TD	Ret	Yds	TD
2017	Memphis	0	DNP								
2018	Memphis	4	2	24	0	1	83	1	0	0	0
2019	Memphis	9	17	315	3	4	3	1	4	0	0
2020	Memphis	11	63	1,053	11	2	14	0	20	188	1
2021	Memphis	12	74	1,149	8	1	69	1	5	135	1
Career		36	156	2,541	22	8	169	3	29	323	2

== Personal life ==
Austin is the son of Calvin and Mimi Austin. His father went to college at University of Memphis as well.
