= Diego Fagot =

American football player (born 1997)

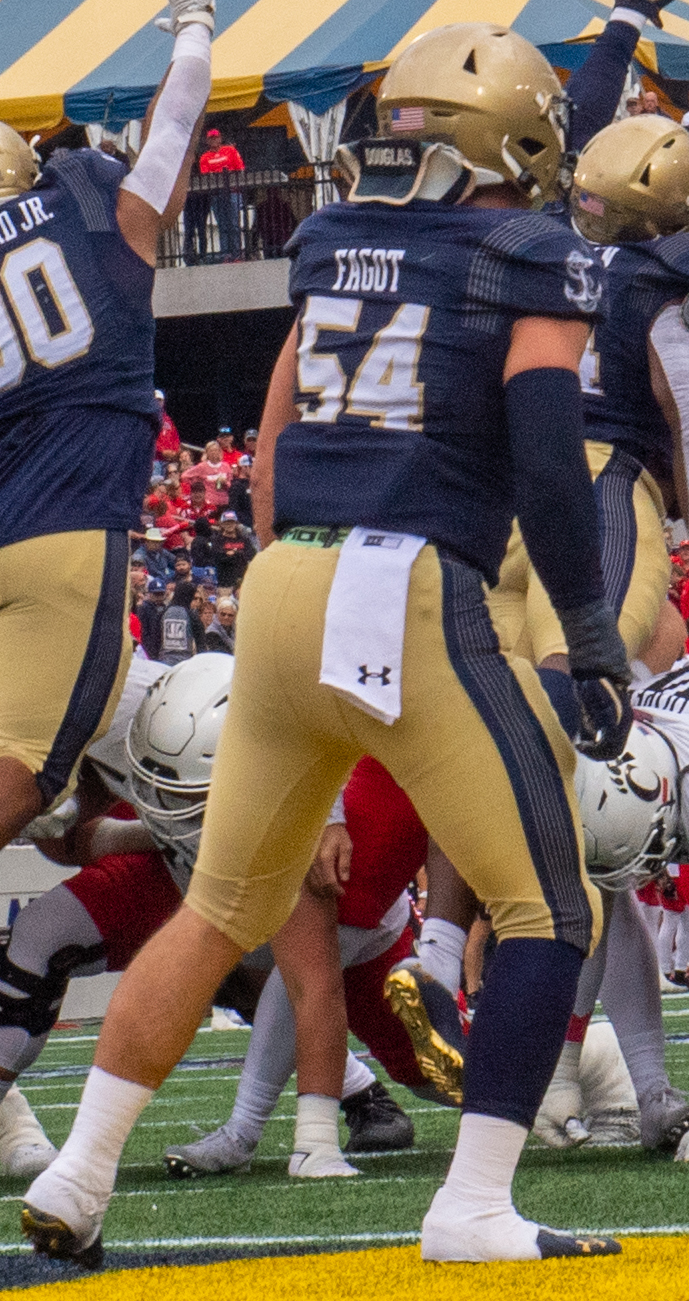
- Fagot with the Navy Midshipmen in 2021

No. 42, 48, 54
- Position: Linebacker

Personal information
- Born: December 30, 1997 (age 28); Fort Lauderdale, Florida, U.S.
- Listed height: 6 ft 3 in (1.91 m)
- Listed weight: 238 lb (108 kg)

Career information
- High school: Calvary Christian (Fort Lauderdale, Florida)
- College: Navy (2018–2021)
- NFL draft: 2022: undrafted

Career history
- Baltimore Ravens (2022)*; Houston Roughnecks (2023)*; New England Patriots (2023)*; Saskatchewan Roughriders (2024)*
- * Offseason or practice squad member only

Awards and highlights
- 2× First-team All-AAC (2019, 2021); Second-team All-AAC (2020)
- Stats at Pro Football Reference

Diego Fagot (born December 30, 1997) is an American former professional football linebacker. He played college football for the Navy Midshipmen and was signed as an undrafted free agent by the Baltimore Ravens after the 2022 NFL draft.

== Early life ==
Fagot was born in Fort Lauderdale, Florida, and played high school football for the Calvary Christian Eagles.

== College career ==
Fagot played college football at the United States Naval Academy for the Navy Midshipmen from 2018 to 2021. He was named All-AAC twice.

== Professional career ==
=== Baltimore Ravens ===
After not being drafted, Fagot was signed by the Baltimore Ravens on May 23, 2022. He was waived on August 23, 2022.

=== Houston Roughnecks ===
Fagot was selected by the Houston Roughnecks of the XFL on November 16, 2022. He was released on February 11, 2023.

=== New England Patriots ===
Fagot signed with the New England Patriots on July 24, 2023. He was waived/injured on August 27, 2023, and placed on injured reserve. He was released on September 1.

=== Saskatchewan Roughriders ===
During the off-season on February 27, 2024, Fagot signed with the Saskatchewan Roughriders, marking his first venture into the Canadian Football League. He was released on June 1.

Fagot announced his retirement from football on October 28, 2024, with plans of commissioning in the United States Navy.
