= Ulysses Bentley IV =

American football player (born 2000)

Profile
- Position: Running back

Personal information
- Born: December 30, 2000 (age 25); Houston, Texas, U.S.
- Listed height: 5 ft 10 in (1.78 m)
- Listed weight: 200 lb (91 kg)

Career information
- High school: C.E. King (Houston, Texas)
- College: SMU (2019–2021); Ole Miss (2022–2024)
- NFL draft: 2025: undrafted

Career history
- Indianapolis Colts (2025); New Orleans Saints (2026)*
- * Offseason or practice squad member only

Awards and highlights
- AAC Co-Rookie of the Year (2020); First-team All-AAC (2020); Second-team All-AAC (2021)

Career NFL statistics as of 2025
- Games played: 1
- Stats at Pro Football Reference

Ulysses Bentley IV (born December 30, 2000) is an American professional football running back. He played college football for the SMU Mustangs and Ole Miss Rebels.

== Early life ==
Bentley attended C.E. King High School in Harris County, Texas, and committed to play college football for the SMU Mustangs.

== College career ==
=== SMU ===
As a freshman in 2019, Bentley took a redshirt. In 2020, he rushed for 913 yards and 11 touchdowns on 170 carries and made 21 receptions for 174 yards and another touchdown. The 11 rushing touchdowns were an SMU freshman record and he was named the AAC co-freshman of the year, as well as first-team all-AAC. In 2021, Bentley ran for 610 yards and four touchdowns and earned second team all-AAC honors. After the season, he entered his name into the NCAA transfer portal.

=== Ole Miss ===
Bentley transferred to play for the Ole Miss Rebels. In his first season with the team, he rushed for 73 yards and four touchdowns on 16 carries. In week 6 of the 2023 season, Bentley rushed for 94 yards and a touchdown on 13 carries in a win over Arkansas. He finished the 2023 season rushing for 540 yards and four touchdowns on 95 carries. In week 7 of the 2024 season, Bentley rushed for 107 yards and a touchdown in a 29-26 loss versus LSU. In the 2024 regular season finale, he ran for 136 yards and a touchdown on 20 carries in a win over rival Mississippi State. After the 2024 season, Bentley declared for the 2025 NFL draft.

== Professional career ==
Pre-draft measurables
Height	Weight	Arm length	Hand span	Wingspan	40-yard dash	10-yard split	20-yard split	20-yard shuttle	Three-cone drill	Vertical jump	Broad jump
5 ft 9 7/8 in (1.77 m)	201 lb (91 kg)	29 in (0.74 m)	8 5/8 in (0.22 m)	5 ft 11 1/8 in (1.81 m)	4.53 s	1.59 s	2.66 s	4.38 s	7.32 s	32.5 in (0.83 m)	9 ft 9 in (2.97 m)
All values from NFL Combine

=== Indianapolis Colts ===
Bentley signed with the Indianapolis Colts as an undrafted free agent on May 9, 2025. He was waived on August 26 as part of final roster cuts and re-signed to the practice squad the next day. Bentley was then elevated to the active roster for the game in both Weeks 1 and 2, subsequently reverting to the practice squad after each game. He signed a reserve/future contract with Indianapolis on January 5, 2026.

On August 30, 2026, Bentley was waived by the Colts as a part of final roster cuts; he was re-signed to the team's practice squad the following day. On September 1, Bentley was again released by Indianapolis.

=== New Orleans Saints ===
On October 1, 2026, Bentley signed with the New Orleans Saints practice squad. On October 13, Bentley was waived from the practice squad.
