= 2021 Peach Bowl (January) =

Postseason college football bowl game

2021 Chick-fil-A Peach Bowl
- CFP New Year's Six; 53rd Peach Bowl
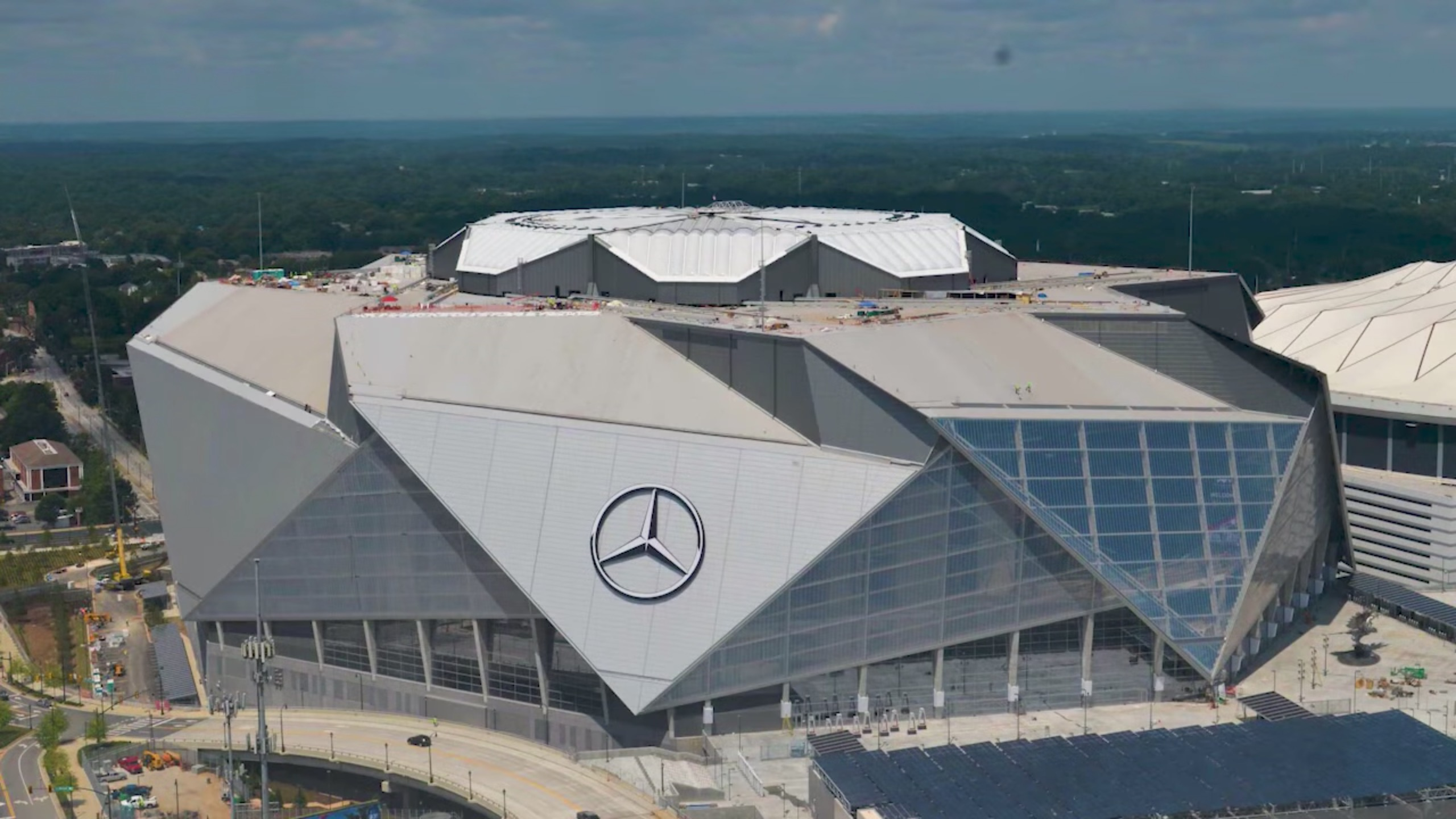
- Mercedes-Benz Stadium in Atlanta, Georgia, hosted the Peach Bowl.
Georgia Bulldogs	Cincinnati Bearcats
(7–2)	(9–0)
SEC	The American
24	21
Head coach: Kirby Smart	Head coach: Luke Fickell
AP / Coaches / CFP; 11 / 9 / 9	AP / Coaches / CFP; 6 / 6 / 8
	1	2	3	4	Total
Georgia	7	3	0	14	24
Cincinnati	7	7	7	0	21
- Date: January 1, 2021
- Season: 2020
- Stadium: Mercedes-Benz Stadium
- Location: Atlanta, Georgia
- MVP: Off.: Jack Podlesny (K, Georgia); Def.: Azeez Ojulari (LB, Georgia)
- Favorite: Georgia by 6
- Referee: Jeff Flanagan (ACC)
- Attendance: 15,301

United States TV coverage
- Network: ESPN and ESPN Radio
- Announcers: ESPN: Mark Jones (play-by-play); Dusty Dvoracek (analyst); Kris Budden (sideline); ESPN Radio: Dave O'Brien and Mike Golic Jr.

The 2021 Peach Bowl was a college football bowl game between the Georgia Bulldogs and Cincinnati Bearcats that was played on January 1, 2021, with kickoff scheduled for 12:30 p.m. EST on ESPN. It was the 53rd edition of the Peach Bowl, and was one of the 2020–21 bowl games concluding the 2020 FBS football season. Sponsored by restaurant chain Chick-fil-A, the game was officially known as the Chick-fil-A Peach Bowl. The game averaged 8.72 million viewers, becoming the most viewed non-semifinal Peach Bowl. Georgia represented the Southeastern Conference (SEC) and Cincinnati represented the American Athletic Conference (AAC).The game was the final game of the 2020 football season for each team and resulted in a 24–21 Georgia victory.

== Teams ==
As one of the New Year's Six bowl games, the participants of the game were determined by the College Football Playoff selection committee. The committee matched No. 8 (Note: Per final CFP Rankings released on December 20.) Cincinnati of the American Athletic Conference (The American) against No. 9 Georgia of the Southeastern Conference (SEC). Georgia had won both of the teams' prior two meetings, in 1942 and 1976.

=== Georgia Bulldogs ===
Georgia entered the bowl with a 7–2 record, all in SEC contests. Georgia played five ranked teams, losing to Alabama and Florida while defeating Auburn, Tennessee, and Missouri. The Bulldogs had a 3–2 record in prior Peach Bowls, most recently appearing in, and winning, the 2006 Chick-fil-A Bowl when it was known by that name.

=== Cincinnati Bearcats ===
Cincinnati entered the bowl with a 9–0 record. After going 6–0 in conference play, the Bearcats defeated Tulsa in the AAC Championship Game. Cincinnati defeated three ranked teams during the season: Tulsa, Army, and SMU. This was the first appearance by the Bearcats in a Peach Bowl.

== Game summary ==
Cincinnati lead 21-10 going into the fourth quarter with Georgia having not scored a touchdown since the first quarter.

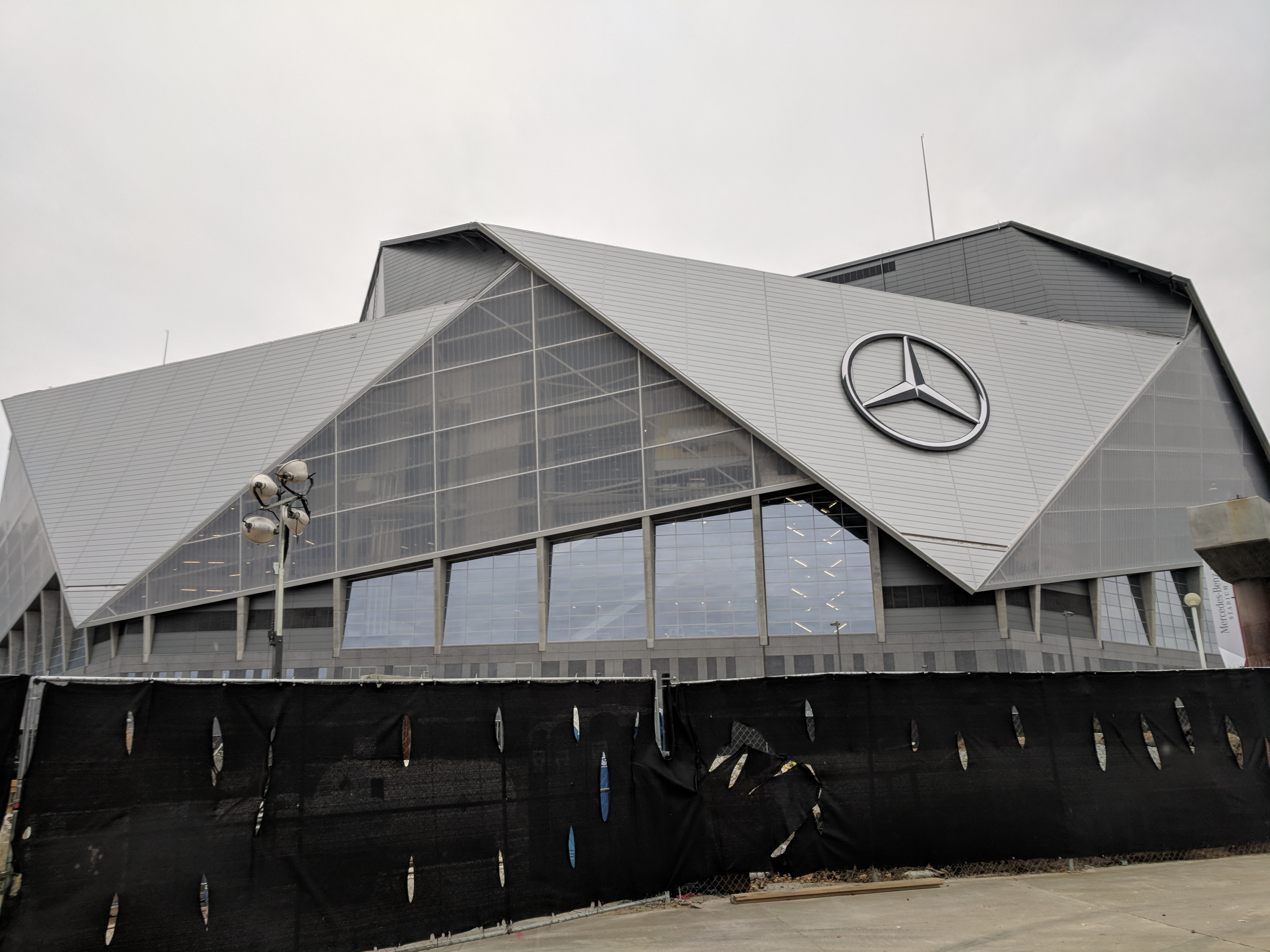
Mercedes-Benz Stadium

Georgia's comeback win marked Kirby Smart's biggest comeback win at his tenure with Georgia.

=== First quarter ===
Georgia got the ball first and was forced to punt on the first drive. One Cincinnati's first drive they were also forced to punt. On the ensuing Georgia drive punter Jake Camarda's shanked 4 yard punt put Cincinnati in UGA territory. Desmond Ridder capped off the Bearcats drive with a 14 yard touchdown pass to Alec Pierce. After a JT Daniels interception and Cincinnati punt, Georgia got on the board on a 16 yard George Pickens touchdown to end the first quarter with a 7-7 tie.

=== Second quarter ===
The two teams traded possessions before Cincinnati missed a field goal. Georgia responded with a 38 yard Jack Podlesney field goal to give Georgia their first lead of the game. The Bearcats would answer back with an 11 yard touchdown to give them a 14-10 lead at half time.

=== Third quarter ===
Cincinnati scored on a 79 yard touchdown run by Jerome Ford on the second play of the half. On the next drive, Georgia drove down to the Bearcats 18 yard line before a JT Daniels fumble gave the ball back to Cincinnati. The two teams traded turns with the ball with neither team scoring.

=== Fourth quarter ===
The fourth quarter started with Cincinnati having the ball. Georgia linebacker Azeez Ojulari sacked Desmond Ridder forcing a fumble. Adam Anderson would pick it up for Georgia giving them the ball in Bearcat territory. The Bulldogs would score on a Zamir White touchdown run on the following possession. Cincinnati would punt and a Georgia 32 yard field goal shortened the Bearcat's 21-19 lead. The teams then traded punts. The Bulldogs started burning timeouts and Cincinnati was a first down away from winning. It was third down and two. Ridder threw an incomplete pass giving Georgia one last chance to win. JT Daniels lead Georgia to the Bearcat 36 yard line. Jack Podlesney would then make a 53-yard field goal, tying the Peach Bowl record for longest field goal, to give Georgia a 22-21 lead with two seconds remaining. On the last play of the game Azeez Ojulari would sack Ridder in the end zone for a safety to seal a 24-21 Georgia victory.

=== Scoring summary ===
2021 Chick-fil-A Peach Bowl

Quarter	1	2	3	4	Total
No. 9 Georgia	7	3	0	14	24
No. 8 Cincinnati	7	7	7	0	21

at Mercedes-Benz Stadium • Atlanta, Georgia

- Date: Friday, January 1, 2021
- Game time: 12:00 p.m. EST
- Game weather: Temperature: 66 °F (19 °C) • Stadium Roof Closed
- Referee: Jeff Flanagan (ACC)
- TV announcers (ESPN): Mark Jones (play-by-play), Dusty Dvoracek (analyst), and Kris Budden (sideline)
- ESPN game summary

Game information

First quarter

- (4:38) CIN – Alec Pierce 14 yard pass from Desmond Ridder, Cole Smith kick (Drive: 7 plays, 42 yards, 3:45; Cincinnati 7–0)
- (0:29) UGA – George Pickens 16 yard pass from JT Daniels, Jack Podlesny kick (Drive: 5 plays, 44 yards, 2:07; Tied 7–7)

Second quarter

- (3:46) UGA – Jack Podlesny 38 yard field goal (Drive: 6 plays, 60 yards, 2:51; Georgia 10–7)
- (0:06) CIN – Josh Whyle 11 yard pass from Desmond Ridder, Cole Smith kick (Drive: 9 plays, 75 yards, 3:40; Cincinnati 14–10)

Third quarter

- (14:11) CIN – Jerome Ford 79 yard rush, Cole Smith kick (Drive: 2 plays, 75 yards, 0:49; Cincinnati 21–10)

Fourth quarter

- (13:20) UGA – Zamir White 9 yard rush, JT Daniels pass failed (Drive: 2 plays, 25 yards, 0:41; Cincinnati 21–16)
- (6:43) UGA – Jack Podlesny 32 yard field goal (Drive: 6 plays, 61 yards, 2:16; Cincinnati 21–19)
- (0:03) UGA – Jack Podlesny 53 yard field goal (Drive: 8 plays, 44 yards, 1:25; Georgia 22–21)
- (0:00) UGA – Azeez Ojulari tackled Desmond Ridder in the end zone for a safety (Georgia 24–21)

=== Statistics ===
Statistics	UGA	CIN
First downs	19	16
Plays–yards	63–449	64–305
Rushes–yards	24–45	27–99
Passing yards	404	206
Passing: comp–att–int	27–39–1	24–37–0
Time of possession	28:36	31:24

Team	Category	Player	Statistics
Georgia	Passing	JT Daniels	26/38, 392 yards, 1 TD, 1 INT
Georgia	Rushing	Zamir White	11 carries, 39 yards, 1 TD
Georgia	Receiving	George Pickens	7 receptions, 135 yards, 1 TD
Cincinnati	Passing	Desmond Ridder	24/37, 206 yards, 2 TD
Cincinnati	Rushing	Jerome Ford	8 carries, 97 yards, 1 TD
Cincinnati	Receiving	Michael Young	4 receptions, 59 yards

== 2021 season ==
The following season both Georgia and Cincinnati made the College Football Playoff. Despite not winning, the Peach Bowl was seen as a statement game for Cincinnati and The Group of 5. Georgia finished the year with a perfect 12-0 record before losing to Alabama in the 2021 SEC Championship. Cincinnati finished undefeated at 13-0. Georgia played Michigan in the 2021 Orange Bowl, winning 34-11. Cincinnati played Alabama in the 2021 Cotton Bowl, losing 27-6. Georgia re-matched Alabama in the 2022 National Championship Game winning 33-18 to claim their first Championship since 1980.
