= 2020 Cincinnati Bearcats football team =

American college football season

2020 Cincinnati Bearcats football

AAC champion

AAC Championship Game, W 27–24 vs. Tulsa

Peach Bowl, L 21–24 vs. Georgia
- Conference: American Athletic Conference

Ranking
- Coaches: No. 8
- AP: No. 8
- Record: 9–1 (6–0 AAC)
- Head coach: Luke Fickell (4th season)
- Offensive coordinator: Mike Denbrock (4th season)
- Offensive scheme: Multiple
- Defensive coordinator: Marcus Freeman (4th season)
- Base defense: 4–2–5
- Home stadium: Nippert Stadium

2020 American Athletic Conference football standings
	Conf.			Overall
Team	W		L	W		L
No. 8 Cincinnati y$	6	–	0	9	–	1
Tulsa y	6	–	0	6	–	3
Memphis	5	–	3	8	–	3
UCF	5	–	3	6	–	4
SMU	4	–	3	7	–	3
Houston	3	–	3	3	–	5
Navy	3	–	4	3	–	7
Tulane	3	–	5	6	–	6
East Carolina	3	–	5	3	–	6
Temple	1	–	6	1	–	6
South Florida	0	–	7	1	–	8
Championship: Cincinnati 27, Tulsa 24
$ – Conference champion; y – Championship game participant; Rankings from AP Poll.

The 2020 Cincinnati Bearcats football team represented the University of Cincinnati in the 2020 NCAA Division I FBS football season. The Bearcats played their home games at Nippert Stadium and competed as members of the American Athletic Conference. They were led by fourth-year head coach Luke Fickell.

== Recruits ==
College recruiting information (2020)
Name	Hometown	School	Height	Weight	Commit date
Evan Prater; QB	Cincinnati, Ohio	Wyoming High School	6 ft 5 in (1.96 m)	190 lb (86 kg)	May 2, 2019
Evan Prater; QB	Recruit ratings: Rivals: 247Sports: ESPN:				
Jadon Thompson; WR	Naperville, Illinois	Marist High School	6 ft 1 in (1.85 m)	160 lb (73 kg)	Feb 4, 2020
Jadon Thompson; WR	Recruit ratings: Rivals: 247Sports: ESPN:				
Jaheim Thomas; OLB	Cincinnati, Ohio	Princeton High School	6 ft 3 in (1.91 m)	214 lb (97 kg)	Jul 20, 2019
Jaheim Thomas; OLB	Recruit ratings: Rivals: 247Sports: ESPN:				
Chris Scott; WR	Pickerington, Ohio	Pickerington North High School	6 ft 0 in (1.83 m)	175 lb (79 kg)	Jan 27, 2020
Chris Scott; WR	Recruit ratings: Rivals: 247Sports: ESPN:				
Marquez Bell; WR	Lake City, Florida	Columbia High School	6 ft 0 in (1.83 m)	160 lb (73 kg)	Feb 5, 2020
Marquez Bell; WR	Recruit ratings: Rivals: 247Sports: ESPN:				
Sammy Anderson; S	Trotwood, Ohio	Trotwood-Madison High School	6 ft 1 in (1.85 m)	170 lb (77 kg)	Nov 15, 2019
Sammy Anderson; S	Recruit ratings: Rivals: 247Sports: ESPN:				
Daved Jones; OLB	West Chester, Ohio	Lakota West High School	6 ft 1 in (1.85 m)	207 lb (94 kg)	Jul 2, 2019
Daved Jones; OLB	Recruit ratings: Rivals: 247Sports: ESPN:				
Gavin Gerhardt; OL	Xenia, Ohio	Xenia West High School	6 ft 5 in (1.96 m)	300 lb (140 kg)	Nov 5, 2018
Gavin Gerhardt; OL	Recruit ratings: Rivals: 247Sports: ESPN:				
Kobe McAllister; OL	Ringgold, Georgia	Heritage High School	6 ft 6 in (1.98 m)	275 lb (125 kg)	Apr 5, 2019
Kobe McAllister; OL	Recruit ratings: Rivals: 247Sports: ESPN:				
John Williams; OL	Bolingbrook, Illinois	Bolingbrook High School	6 ft 5 in (1.96 m)	300 lb (140 kg)	Apr 6, 2019
John Williams; OL	Recruit ratings: Rivals: 247Sports: ESPN:				
Deshawn Pace; DB	Cincinnati, Ohio	Colerain High School	6 ft 3 in (1.91 m)	195 lb (88 kg)	Apr 20, 2019
Deshawn Pace; DB	Recruit ratings: Rivals: 247Sports: ESPN:				
Jake Renfro; OC	New Lenox, Illinois	Providence Catholic High School	6 ft 2 in (1.88 m)	290 lb (130 kg)	Jun 18, 2019
Jake Renfro; OC	Recruit ratings: Rivals: 247Sports: ESPN:				
Sterling Miles; DE	West Bloomfield, Michigan	West Bloomfield High School	6 ft 5 in (1.96 m)	230 lb (100 kg)	Jun 21, 2019
Sterling Miles; DE	Recruit ratings: Rivals: 247Sports: ESPN:				
Tyler Scott; ATH	Norton, Ohio	Norton High School	5 ft 10 in (1.78 m)	170 lb (77 kg)	Jul 4, 2019
Tyler Scott; ATH	Recruit ratings: Rivals: 247Sports: ESPN:				
Justin Wodtly; DT	Cleveland, Ohio	Cleveland Heights High School	6 ft 3 in (1.91 m)	270 lb (120 kg)	Jul 26, 2019
Justin Wodtly; DT	Recruit ratings: Rivals: 247Sports: ESPN:				
Ethan Wright; ATH	Akron, Ohio	Manchester High School	6 ft 0 in (1.83 m)	190 lb (86 kg)	Dec 5, 2019
Ethan Wright; ATH	Recruit ratings: Rivals: 247Sports: ESPN:				
Payten Singletary; TE	Thomasville, Georgia	Thomasville High School	6 ft 4 in (1.93 m)	225 lb (102 kg)	Aug 2, 2019
Payten Singletary; TE	Recruit ratings: Rivals: 247Sports: ESPN:				
Todd Bumphis Jr. WR	Toledo, Ohio	Saint Francis De Sales High School	6 ft 0 in (1.83 m)	180 lb (82 kg)	Jun 22, 2019
Todd Bumphis Jr. WR	Recruit ratings: Rivals: 247Sports: ESPN:				
Dominique Perry; DE	Germantown, Maryland	Northwest High School	6 ft 3 in (1.91 m)	245 lb (111 kg)	Jan 26, 2020
Dominique Perry; DE	Recruit ratings: Rivals: 247Sports: ESPN:				
Norman Love; ATH	Lake Wales, Florida	Lake Wales High School	5 ft 11 in (1.80 m)	185 lb (84 kg)	Jun 11, 2019
Norman Love; ATH	Recruit ratings: Rivals: 247Sports: ESPN:				
Overall recruit ranking: Rivals: 39 247Sports: 40
Note: In many cases, Scout, Rivals, 247Sports, On3, and ESPN may conflict in their listings of height and weight.; In these cases, the average was taken. ESPN grades are on a 100-point scale.; Sources: "2020 Cincinnati Football Commitment List". Rivals.; "2020 Players Commitments – Cincinnati". ESPN.; "2020 Team Ranking". Rivals.com.; "2020 Cincinnati Bearcats football team". 247Sports.

=== Incoming transfers ===
Name	Pos.	Height	Weight	Year	Hometown	Prev. School
Jerome Ford	RB	5' 11"	206	Sophomore (Redshirt)	Seffner, FL	Alabama
Michael Young Jr.	WR	5' 11"	190	Junior	Destrehan, LA	Notre Dame
Jordan Jones	WR	6' 1"	185	Senior	Smackover, AR	Arkansas

== Preseason ==
=== Award watch lists ===
Listed in the order that they were released

Award	Player	Position	Year
Bednarik Award	Darrick Forrest	S	Sr.
Bednarik Award	Sauce Gardner	CB	So.
Thorpe Award	Darrick Forrest	S	Sr.
Thorpe Award	Sauce Gardner	CB	So.
Thorpe Award	James Wiggins	S	Sr.
Nagurski Award	Darrick Forrest	S	Sr.
Nagurski Award	James Wiggins	S	Sr.
Ray Guy Award	James Smith	P	Sr.
Wuerffel Trophy	Blake Bacevich	DE	So.

=== AAC preseason media poll ===
The preseason Poll was released September 1

Media poll
Predicted finish	Team	Votes (1st place)
1	UCF	204 (10)
2	Cincinnati	201 (7)
3	Memphis	192 (2)
4	SMU	146
5	Navy	125 (1)
6	Tulane	118
7	Houston	114
8	Temple	88
9	Tulsa	49
10	East Carolina	42
11	South Florida	41

== Schedule ==
The Bearcats' 2020 schedule consisted of six home games and four away games. with the departure of UConn, the American eliminated divisions for the 2020 and 2021 seasons, the Bearcats 2020 schedule will include eight conference games – four home games and four road games. Cincinnati hosted East Carolina, Houston, Memphis, and South Florida. They will travel to UCF, SMU, Temple, and Tulsa.

The Bearcats' hosted their opening non-conference game against Austin Peay (FCS). Cincinnati had a sixth home game against Western Michigan and two away games scheduled against Nebraska and Miami (OH), which were canceled due to the COVID-19 pandemic. This was the first season since 1944 that the Bearcats did not play Miami (OH) in the battle for the Victory Bell. To replace the canceled games, Cincinnati added a series against Army with a return game at Army scheduled for 2031.

The game between Tulsa and Cincinnati was originally scheduled to take place on October 17, however, due to COVID-19 management requirements in response to positive tests and subsequent quarantine of individuals within the Cincinnati program, the game was eventually rescheduled for December 12.

A COVID-19 outbreak within the Cincinnati program lead to the cancellation of the game between Temple and Cincinnati, scheduled for November 28, and the rescheduled game between Tulsa and Cincinnati, scheduled for December 12. In lieu of a head-to-head result against Tulsa, Cincinnati was granted hosting rights for the American Championship based upon conference tiebreakers.

Date	Time	Opponent	Rank	Site	TV	Result	Attendance
September 19	12:00 p.m.	Austin Peay*	No. 13	Nippert Stadium; Cincinnati, OH	ESPN+	W 55–20	0
September 26	3:30 p.m.	No. 22 Army*	No. 14	Nippert Stadium; Cincinnati, OH	ESPN	W 24–10	0
October 3	3:30 p.m.	South Florida^{†}	No. 15	Nippert Stadium; Cincinnati, OH	ESPN+	W 28–7	0
October 24	9:00 p.m.	at No. 16 SMU	No. 9	Gerald J. Ford Stadium; University Park, TX	ESPN2	W 42–13	7,898
October 31	12:00 p.m.	Memphis	No. 7	Nippert Stadium; Cincinnati, OH (rivalry)	ESPN	W 49–10	0
November 7	3:30 p.m.	Houston	No. 6	Nippert Stadium; Cincinnati, OH	ABC	W 38–10	0
November 13	7:30 p.m.	East Carolina	No. 7	Nippert Stadium; Cincinnati, OH	ESPN2	W 55–17	0
November 21	3:30 p.m.	at UCF	No. 7	Bounce House; Orlando, FL (rivalry)	ESPN	W 36–33	10,668
December 19	8:00 p.m.	No. 23 Tulsa	No. 9	Nippert Stadium; Cincinnati, OH (American Championship)	ABC	W 27–24	5,831
January 1, 2021	12:30 p.m.	vs. No. 9 Georgia*	No. 8	Mercedes-Benz Stadium; Atlanta, GA (Peach Bowl)	ESPN	L 21–24	15,301
*Non-conference game; ^{†}Homecoming; Rankings from AP Poll and CFP Rankings after November 24 released prior to game; All times are in Eastern time

Schedule Source:

== Game summaries ==
=== Austin Peay ===
Austin Peay at Cincinnati

Team	1	2	3	4	Total
Governors	3	0	3	14	20
• No. 13 Bearcats	14	14	14	13	55

- Date: September 19
- Location: Nippert Stadium
  Cincinnati, OH
- Game start: 12:05 p.m.
- Elapsed time: 3 hours and 09 minutes
- Game attendance: 0
- Game weather: 63 °F (17 °C) • Weather: Sunny • Wind: ENE 10 mph
- Referee: Edwin Lee
- TV announcers (ESPN+): David Saltzman and Keith Moreland

Scoring summary
1	13:31	CIN	Tre Tucker 29-yard pass from Desmond Ridder (Cole Smith kick) (5 plays, 74 yards, 1:39)	CIN 0–7
1	06:21	APSU	Grant Paulette 30-yard field goal (14 plays, 62 yards, 6:53)	CIN 3–7
1	00:33	CIN	Gerrid Doaks 1-yard rush (Cole Smith kick) (13 plays, 81 yards, 5:43)	CIN 3–14
2	12:01	CIN	Gerrid Doaks 1-yard rush (Cole Smith kick) (5 plays, 55 yards, 2:04)	CIN 3–21
2	03:39	CIN	Gerrid Doaks 2-yard rush (Cole Smith kick) (8 plays, 71 yards, 4:33)	CIN 3–28
3	09:02	APSU	Grant Paulette 29-yard field goal (15 plays, 63 yards, 5:58)	CIN 6–28
3	03:55	CIN	Gerrid Doaks 32-yard pass from Desmond Ridder (Cole Smith kick) (7 plays, 51 yards, 3:03)	CIN 6–35
3	01:13	CIN	Jerome Ford 2-yard rush, (Cole Smith kick) (3 plays, 15 yards, 0:37)	CIN 6–42
4	13:39	CIN	Ben Bryant 40-yard rush, (Cole Smith kick failed) (4 plays, 67 yards, 1:12)	CIN 6–48
4	09:16	APSU	CJ Evans Jr. 1-yard rush, (Grant Paulette kick) (10 plays, 75 yards, 4:23)	CIN 13–48
4	07:59	CIN	Josh Whyle 8-yard pass from Ben Bryant, (Cole Smith kick) (6 plays, 66 yards, 1:16)	CIN 13–55
4	05:54	APSU	CJ Evans Jr. 64-yard rush (Grant Paulette kick) (4 plays, 75 yards, 2:05)	CIN 20–55

Statistics	APSU	CIN
First downs	18	24
Plays–yards	75–353	67–525
Rushes–yards	37–140	41–276
Passing yards	213	249
Passing: comp–att–int	22–39–1	17–26–0
Time of possession	33:06	26:54

Team	Category	Player	Statistics
APSU	Passing	Jeremy Oatsvall	20/34, 202 yards, 1 INT
APSU	Rushing	C.J. Evans Jr.	12 carries, 89 yards, 2 TD
APSU	Receiving	Baniko Harley	4 receptions, 94 yards
CIN	Passing	Desmond Ridder	13/19, 176 yards
CIN	Rushing	Desmond Ridder	4 carries, 61 yards
CIN	Receiving	Gerrid Doaks	4 receptions, 64 yards, 1 TD

=== Army ===
Army at Cincinnati

Team	1	2	3	4	Total
No. 22 Black Knights	7	0	0	3	10
• No. 14 Bearcats	3	7	7	7	24

- Date: September 26
- Location: Nippert Stadium
  Cincinnati, OH
- Game start: 3:35 p.m.
- Elapsed time: 3 hours and 30 minutes
- Game attendance: 0
- Game weather: 79 °F (26 °C) • Weather: Partly Cloudy • Wind: SSW 7 mph
- Referee: Charles Lamertina
- TV announcers (ESPN): Mark Jones, Dusty Dvoracek, and Quint Kessenich

Scoring summary
1	14:09	ARMY	Jabari Moore 41 Yard fumble recovery (Landon Slayers kick)	ARMY 7–0
1	10:50	CIN	Cole Smith 33-yard field goal (8 plays, 48 yards, 3:18)	ARMY 7–3
2	07:25	CIN	Michael Young Jr. 12-yard pass from Desmond Ridder (Cole Smith kick) (14 plays, 91 yards, 6:10)	CIN 7–10
3	08:00	CIN	Jerome Ford 4-yard rush (Cole Smith kick) (7 plays, 60 yards, 2:48)	CIN 7–17
4	14:56	ARMY	Landon Slayers 36-yard field goal (9 plays, 73 yards, 4:09)	CIN 10–17
4	06:55	CIN	Gerrid Doaks 60-yard pass from Desmond Ridder (Cole Smith kick) (2 plays, 68 yards, 0:51)	CIN 10–24

Statistics	ARMY	CIN
First downs	18	14
Plays–yards	64–276	69–331
Rushes–yards	43–182	35–69
Passing yards	94	262
Passing: comp–att–int	9–21–1	19–34–1
Time of possession	30:32	29:28

Team	Category	Player	Statistics
ARMY	Passing	Christian Anderson	9/21, 94 yards, 1 INT
ARMY	Rushing	Christian Anderson	22 carries, 81 yards
ARMY	Receiving	Michael Roberts	3 receptions, 46 yards
CIN	Passing	Desmond Ridder	18/33, 258 yards, 2 TD, 1 INT
CIN	Rushing	Jerome Ford	8 carries, 34 yards, 1 TD
CIN	Receiving	Jayshon Jackson	4 receptions, 75 yards

=== South Florida ===
South Florida at Cincinnati

Team	1	2	3	4	Total
Bulls	0	0	7	0	7
• No. 15 Bearcats	7	7	14	0	28

- Date: October 3
- Location: Nippert Stadium
  Cincinnati, OH
- Game start: 3:35 p.m.
- Elapsed time: 3 hours and 15 minutes
- Game attendance: 0
- Game weather: 63 °F (17 °C) • Weather: Mostly Cloudy • Wind: SW 6 mph
- Referee: Hank Johns
- TV announcers (ESPN+): David Saltzman and Keith Moreland

Scoring summary
1	04:28	CIN	Gerrid Doaks 10-yard rush (Cole Smith kick) (13 plays, 92 yards, 6:02)	CIN 0–7
2	00:39	CIN	Josh Whyle 13-yard pass from Desmond Ridder (Cole Smith kick) (11 plays, 65 yards, 4:53)	CIN 0–14
3	04:01	CIN	Bruno Labelle 3-yard pass from Desmond Ridder (Cole Smith kick) (8 plays, 67 yards, 4:10)	CIN 0–21
3	00:49	USF	Johnny Ford 2-yard rush (Jared Sackett kick) (10 plays, 65 yards, 3:06)	CIN 7–21
3	00:36	CIN	Tre Tucker 97-yard kickoff return (Cole Smith kick)	CIN 7–28

Statistics	USF	CIN
First downs	19	22
Plays–yards	74–291	71–332
Rushes–yards	33–83	45–189
Passing yards	208	143
Passing: comp–att–int	21–41–5	16–26–3
Time of possession	23:36	36:24

Team	Category	Player	Statistics
USF	Passing	Jordan McCloud	12/21, 137 yards, 2 INT
USF	Rushing	Leonard Parker	7 carries, 51 yards
USF	Receiving	DeVontres Dukes	3 receptions, 47 yards
CIN	Passing	Desmond Ridder	16/26, 143 yards, 2 TD, 3 INT
CIN	Rushing	Gerrid Doaks	3 carries, 55 yards
CIN	Receiving	Jayshon Jackson	3 receptions, 47 yards

=== At SMU ===
Cincinnati at SMU

Team	1	2	3	4	Total
• No. 9 Bearcats	14	0	14	14	42
No. 16 Mustangs	0	10	0	3	13

- Date: October 24
- Location: Gerald J. Ford Stadium
  University Park, TX
- Game start: 8:10 p.m.
- Elapsed time: 3 hours and 25 minutes
- Game attendance: 7,898
- Game weather: 58 °F (14 °C) • Weather: Cloudy • Wind: E 4 mph
- Referee: Luke Richmond
- TV announcers (ESPN2): Beth Mowins, Kirk Morrison, and Kris Budden

Scoring summary
1	06:05	CIN	Josh Whyle 7-yard pass from Desmond Ridder (Cole Smith kick) (12 plays, 70 yards, 5:32)	CIN 7–0
1	02:20	CIN	Desmond Ridder 15-yard rush (Cole Smith kick) (4 plays, 50 yards, 1:41)	CIN 14–0
2	06:23	SMU	Rashee Rice 9-yard pass from Shane Buechele (Chris Naggar kick) (17 plays, 83 yards, 7:19)	CIN 14–7
2	00:00	SMU	Chris Naggar 26-yard field goal (8 plays, 63 yards, 2:50)	CIN 14–10
3	06:13	CIN	Gerrid Doaks 1-yard rush (Cole Smith kick) (11 plays, 70 yards, 5:22)	CIN 21–10
3	03:22	CIN	Desmond Ridder 32-yard rush (Cole Smith kick) (3 plays, 64 yards, 1:41)	CIN 28–10
4	11:57	SMU	Chris Naggar 22-yard field goal (11 plays, 82 yards, 3:36)	CIN 28–13
4	04:39	CIN	Desmond Ridder 91-yard rush (Cole Smith kick) (1 play, 91 yards, 00:16)	CIN 35–13
4	02:03	CIN	Gerrid Doaks 35-yard rush (Cole Smith kick) (3 plays, 43 yards, 1:41)	CIN 42–13

Statistics	CIN	SMU
First downs	17	22
Plays–yards	56–439	85–290
Rushes–yards	35–313	39–75
Passing yards	126	215
Passing: comp–att–int	13–21–0	24–46–1
Time of possession	27:15	32:45

Team	Category	Player	Statistics
CIN	Passing	Desmond Ridder	13/21, 126 yards, 1 TD, 0 INT
CIN	Rushing	Desmond Ridder	8 carries, 179 yards, 3 TD
CIN	Receiving	Tre Tucker	2 receptions, 24 yards
SMU	Passing	Shane Buechele	23/44, 216 yards, 1 TD, 1 INT
SMU	Rushing	Ulysses Bentley IV	16 carries, 40 yards
SMU	Receiving	Kylen Granson	4 receptions, 68 yards

=== Memphis ===
Memphis at Cincinnati

Team	1	2	3	4	Total
Tigers	7	3	0	0	10
• No. 7 Bearcats	7	14	14	14	49

- Date: October 31
- Location: Nippert Stadium
  Cincinnati, OH
- Game start: 12:02 p.m.
- Elapsed time: 3 hours and 16 minutes
- Game attendance: 0
- Game weather: 48 °F (9 °C) • Weather: Partly Cloudy • Wind: SE 6 mph
- Referee: Charles Lamertina
- TV announcers (ESPN): Mark Jones, Dusty Dvoracek, and Paul Carcaterra

Scoring summary
1	09:15	CIN	Alec Pierce 43-yard pass from Desmond Ridder (Cole Smith kick) (75 plays, 75 yards, 2:18)	CIN 0–7
1	4:07	MEM	Tahj Washington 92-yard pass from Brady White (Riley Patterson kick) (1 play, 92 yards, 0:15)	TIED 7–7
2	13:58	CIN	Desmond Ridder 13-yard rush (Cole Smith kick) (11 plays, 75 yards, 5:09)	CIN 7–14
2	04:04	CIN	Michael Young Jr. 6-yard pass from Desmond Ridder (Cole Smith kick) (8 plays, 70 yards, 4:14)	CIN 7–21
2	00:28	MEM	Riley Patterson 42-yard field goal (12 plays, 60 yards, 3:30)	CIN 10–21
3	06:23	CIN	Desmond Ridder 9-yard rush (Cole Smith kick) (9 plays, 90 yards, 4:53)	CIN 10–28
3	01:29	CIN	Tre Tucker 21-yard pass from Desmond Ridder (Cole Smith kick) (5 plays, 55 yards, 2:41)	CIN 10–35
4	08:02	CIN	Jerome Ford 33-yard rush (Cole Smith kick) (1 play, 33 yards, 0:08)	CIN 10–42
4	01:30	CIN	Jerome Ford 48-yard rush (Cole Smith kick) (6 plays, 67 yards, 03:42)	CIN 10–49

Statistics	MEM	CIN
First downs	15	28
Plays–yards	64–321	67–513
Rushes–yards	29–5	41–242
Passing yards	316	271
Passing: comp–att–int	18–35–0	21–26–1
Time of possession	25:10	34:50

Team	Category	Player	Statistics
MEM	Passing	Brady White	18/35, 316 yards, 1 TD, 0 INT
MEM	Rushing	Rodrigues Clark	12 carries, 16 yards
MEM	Receiving	Calvin Austin	7 receptions, 121 yards
CIN	Passing	Desmond Ridder	21/26, 271 yards, 3 TD, 1 INT
CIN	Rushing	Jerome Ford	9 carries, 116 yards, 2 TD
CIN	Receiving	Michael Young Jr.	5 receptions, 43 yards, 1 TD

=== Houston ===
Houston at Cincinnati

Team	1	2	3	4	Total
Cougars	0	10	0	0	10
• No. 6 Bearcats	7	21	3	7	38

- Date: November 7
- Location: Nippert Stadium
  Cincinnati, OH
- Game start: 03:41 p.m.
- Elapsed time: 3 hours and 16 minutes
- Game attendance: 0
- Game weather: 73 °F (23 °C) • Weather: Sunny • Wind: S 3 mph
- Referee: Edwin Lee
- TV announcers (ABC): Sean McDonough, Todd Blackledge, Todd McShay, and Molly McGrath

Scoring summary
1	08:51	CIN	Gerrid Doaks 2-yard rush (Cole Smith kick) (5 plays, 84 yards, 2:20)	CIN 0–7
2	07:53	CIN	Desmond Ridder 10-yard rush (Cole Smith kick) (10 plays, 75 yards, 3:06)	CIN 0–14
2	04:17	HOU	Kyle Porter 3-yard rush (Dalton Witherspoon kick) (8 plays, 65 yards, 3:29)	CIN 7–14
2	01:40	CIN	Desmond Ridder 32-yard rush (Cole Smith kick) (6 plays, 75 yards, 2:37)	CIN 7–21
2	00:38	HOU	Dalton Witherspoon 27-yard field goal (5 plays, 55 yards, 1:02)	CIN 10–21
2	00:13	CIN	Josh Whyle 21-yard pass from Desmond Ridder (Cole Smith kick) (3 plays, 55 yards, 0:28)	CIN 10–28
3	05:48	CIN	Cole Smith 32-yard field goal (17 plays, 60 yards, 9:12)	CIN 10–31
4	14:15	CIN	Desmond Ridder 12-yard rush (Cole Smith kick) (10 play, 85 yards, 3:09)	CIN 10–38

Statistics	HOU	CIN
First downs	15	24
Plays–yards	62–282	69–510
Rushes–yards	28–93	39–342
Passing yards	189	168
Passing: comp–att–int	20–34–1	20–30–1
Time of possession	27:31	32:29

Team	Category	Player	Statistics
HOU	Passing	Clayton Tune	20/34, 189 yards, 0 TD, 1 INT
HOU	Rushing	Kyle Porter	16 carries, 69 yards, 1 TD
HOU	Receiving	Tank Dell	3 receptions, 60 yards
CIN	Passing	Desmond Ridder	17/27, 162 yards, 1 TD, 1 INT
CIN	Rushing	Gerrid Doaks	16 carries, 184 yards, 1 TD
CIN	Receiving	Michael Young Jr.	4 receptions, 47 yards

=== East Carolina ===
East Carolina at Cincinnati

Team	1	2	3	4	Total
Pirates	0	10	0	7	17
• No. 7 Bearcats	7	28	7	13	55

- Date: November 13
- Location: Nippert Stadium
  Cincinnati, OH
- Game start: 07:31 p.m.
- Elapsed time: 3 hours and 37 minutes
- Game attendance: 0
- Game weather: 43 °F (6 °C) • Weather: Clear • Wind: NW 10 mph
- Referee: Tim Rich
- TV announcers (ESPN2): Jason Benetti, Andre Ware, and Rocky Boiman

Scoring summary
1	09:14	CIN	Michael Young Jr. 33-yard pass from Desmond Ridder (Cole Smith kick) (10 plays, 79 yards, 4:34)	CIN 0–7
2	14:52	CIN	Jarell White 26-yard Interception (Cole Smith kick)	CIN 0–14
2	10:36	ECU	Keaton Mitchell 18-yard rush (Jake Verity kick) (3 plays, 58 yards, 0:50)	CIN 7–14
2	08:23	CIN	Jerome Ford 24-yard rush (Cole Smith kick) (6 plays, 70 yards, 2:09)	CIN 7–21
2	05:25	ECU	Jake Verity 32-yard field goal (7 plays, 44 yards, 2:04)	CIN 10–21
2	05:18	CIN	Tre Tucker 45-yard pass from Desmond Ridder (Cole Smith kick) (1 play, 45 yards, 0:07)	CIN 10–28
2	01:32	CIN	Desmond Ridder 7-yard rush (Cole Smith kick) (7 plays, 53 yards, 3:04)	CIN 10–35
3	00:29	CIN	Jayshon Jackson 12-yard pass from Desmond Ridder (Cole Smith kick) (11 plays, 85 yards, 4:06)	CIN 10–42
4	05:41	CIN	Jerome Ford 1-yard rush (Cole Smith kick) (9 plays, 75 yards, 4:07)	CIN 10–49
4	00:17	ECU	Rahjai Harris 1-yard rush (Jake Verity kick) (13 plays, 73 yards, 5:17)	CIN 17–49
4	00:10	CIN	Cameron Young 75-yard rush (Cole Smith kick failed) (1 play, 75 yards, 0:07)	CIN 17–55

Statistics	ECU	CIN
First downs	23	29
Plays–yards	71–293	66–653
Rushes–yards	50–206	32–299
Passing yards	87	354
Passing: comp–att–int	9–21–3	27–34–0
Time of possession	29:50	30:10

Team	Category	Player	Statistics
ECU	Passing	Holton Ahlers	9/20, 87 yards, 0 TD, 3 INT
ECU	Rushing	Keaton Mitchell	17 carries, 124 yards, 1 TD
ECU	Receiving	Keaton Mitchell	1 reception, 26 yards
CIN	Passing	Desmond Ridder	24/31, 327 yards, 3 TD, 0 INT
CIN	Rushing	Cameron Young	1 carry, 75 yards, 1 TD
CIN	Receiving	Tre Tucker	4 receptions, 69 yards, 1 TD

=== At UCF ===
Cincinnati at UCF

Team	1	2	3	4	Total
• No. 7 Bearcats	3	16	3	14	36
Knights	14	3	8	8	33

- Date: November 21
- Location: Bounce House
  Orlando, FL
- Game start: 03:35 p.m.
- Elapsed time: 4 hours and 1 minute
- Game attendance: 10,668
- Game weather: 72 °F (22 °C) • Weather: Cloudy • Wind: NE 11 mph
- Referee: Charles Lamertina
- TV announcers (ESPN): Mark Jones, Dusty Dvoracek, and Quint Kessenich

Scoring summary
1	12:44	UCF	Greg McCrae 3-yard rush (Daniel Obarski kick) (9 plays, 75 yards, 2:16)	UCF 0–7
1	10:10	CIN	Cole Smith 47-yard field goal (6 plays, 35 yards, 2:34)	UCF 3–7
1	07:39	UCF	Marlon Williams 6-yard pass from Dillon Gabriel (Daniel Obarski kick) (6 plays, 22 yards, 1:33)	UCF 3–14
2	11:37	CIN	Josh Whyle 29-yard pass from Desmond Ridder (Cole Smith kick) (5 plays, 73 yards, 1:22)	UCF 10–14
2	03:14	CIN	Cole Smith 26-yard field goal (10 plays, 68 yards, 5:31)	UCF 13–14
2	01:23	CIN	Desmond Ridder 3-yard rush (Two-point pass conversion failed) (5 plays, 70 yards, 0:43)	CIN 19–14
2	00:01	UCF	Daniel Obarski 36-yard field goal (11 plays, 56 yards, 1:22)	CIN 19–17
3	06:29	CIN	Cole Smith 22-yard field goal (16 plays, 87 yards, 8:31)	CIN 22–17
3	03:59	UCF	Marlon Williams 19-yard pass from Dillon Gabriel (Gabriel pass to Williams for two-point conversion) (10 plays, 75 yards, 2:30)	UCF 22–25
4	13:07	CIN	Desmond Ridder 1-yard rush (Cole Smith kick) (4 plays, 16 yards, 1:01)	CIN 29–25
4	07:15	CIN	Leonard Taylor 7-yard pass from Desmond Ridder (Cole Smith kick) (10 plays, 71 yards, 5:14)	CIN 36–25
4	04:27	UCF	Jaylon Robinson 10-yard pass from Dillon Gabriel (Gabriel pass to Jacob Harris for two-point conversion) (12 plays, 75 yards, 2:48)	CIN 36–33

Statistics	CIN	UCF
First downs	28	23
Plays–yards	80–482	84–359
Rushes–yards	48–144	35–116
Passing yards	338	243
Passing: comp–att–int	21–32–0	26–49–1
Time of possession	37:08	22:52

Team	Category	Player	Statistics
CIN	Passing	Desmond Ridder	21/32, 338 yards, 2 TD, 0 INT
CIN	Rushing	Gerrid Doaks	28 carries, 97 yards
CIN	Receiving	Josh Whyle	5 receptions, 81 yards, 1 TD
UCF	Passing	Dillon Gabriel	26/49, 243 yards, 3 TD, 1 INT
UCF	Rushing	Otis Anderson Jr.	12 carries, 51 yards
UCF	Receiving	Marlon Williams	8 receptions, 97 yards, 2 TD

=== Tulsa (AAC Championship Game) ===
2020 American Athletic Conference Football Championship Game

Team	1	2	3	4	Total
No. 23 Golden Hurricane	0	10	7	7	24
• No. 9 Bearcats	10	7	7	3	27

- Date: December 19, 2020
- Location: Nippert Stadium
  Cincinnati, OH
- Game start: 08:14 p.m. EST
- Elapsed time: 3 hours and 32 minutes
- Game attendance: 5,831
- Game weather: 41 °F (5 °C) • Weather: Drizzling • Wind: S 6 mph
- Referee: Charles Lamertina
- TV announcers (ABC): Joe Tessitore, Greg McElroy, and Holly Rowe

Scoring summary
1	12:44	CIN	Jerome Ford 42-yard rush (Cole Smith kick) (4 plays, 75 yards, 1:54)	CIN 0–7
1	10:10	CIN	Cole Smith 25-yard field goal (11 plays, 72 yards, 5:46)	CIN 0–10
2	11:08	TLS	Zack Long 43-yard field goal (11 plays, 46 yards, 3:52)	CIN 3–10
2	08:36	CIN	Corey Taylor II 10-yard rush (Zack Long kick) (5 plays, 28 yards, 1:37)	TIE 10–10
2	03:17	CIN	Alec Pierce 36-yard pass from Desmond Ridder (Cole Smith kick) (5 plays, 64 yards, 2:04)	CIN 10–17
3	10:05	TLS	Deneric Prince 8-yard rush (Zack Long kick) (3 plays, 55 yards, 0:45)	TIE 17–17
3	07:14	CIN	Desmond Ridder 10-yard rush (Cole Smith kick) (6 plays, 65 yards, 2:46)	CIN 17–24
4	03:41	TLS	JuanCarlos Santana 13-yard pass from Zach Smith (Zack Long kick) (7 plays, 80 yards, 2:46)	TIE 24–24
4	00:00	CIN	Cole Smith 34-yard field goal (12 plays, 51 yards, 3:34)	CIN 27–24

Statistics	TLSA	CIN
First downs	22	17
Plays–yards	67–365	67–420
Rushes–yards	37–199	38–151
Passing yards	166	269
Passing: comp–att–int	13–30–2	19–29–0
Time of possession	26:03	33:57

Team	Category	Player	Statistics
TLSA	Passing	Zach Smith	13/30, 166 yards, 1 TD, 2 INT
TLSA	Rushing	Corey Taylor II	22 carries, 102 yards, 1 TD
TLSA	Receiving	Sam Crawford Jr.	3 receptions, 79 yards
CIN	Passing	Desmond Ridder	19/29, 269 yards, 1 TD
CIN	Rushing	Desmond Ridder	16 carries, 83 yards, 1 TD
CIN	Receiving	Alec Pierce	5 receptions, 146 yards, 1 TD

=== Georgia (Peach Bowl) ===
2021 Chick-fil-A Peach Bowl

Team	1	2	3	4	Total
• No. 9 Bulldogs	7	3	0	14	24
No. 8 Bearcats	7	7	7	0	21

- Date: January 1, 2021
- Location: Mercedes-Benz Stadium • Atlanta, Georgia
- Game start: 12:10 p.m.
- Elapsed time: 3 Hours and 49 Minutes
- Game attendance: 15,301
- Referee: Jeff Flanagan
- TV announcers (ESPN/ESPN Radio): Mark Jones, Dusty Dvoracek, and Kris Budden/Dave O'Brien and Mike Golic Jr.

Scoring summary
1	04:38	CIN	Alec Pierce 14-yard pass from Desmond Ridder (Cole Smith kick) (7 plays, 42 yards, 3:45)	CIN 0–7
1	10:10	UGA	George Pickens 16-yard pass from JT Daniels (Jack Podlesny kick) (5 plays, 44 yards, 2:27)	7–7
2	03:46	UGA	Jack Podlesny 37-yard field goal (5 plays, 44 yards, 2:07)	UGA 10-7
2	00:06	CIN	Josh Whyle 11-yard pass from Desmond Ridder (Cole Smith kick) (9 plays, 75 yards, 3:40)	CIN 10–14
3	14:11	CIN	Jerome Ford 79-yard rush (Cole Smith kick) (2 plays, 75 yards, 0:49)	CIN 10–21
4	13:20	UGA	Zamir White 9-rush (JT Daniels pass failed) (2 plays, 25 yards, 0:41)	CIN 16–21
4	06:43	UGA	Jack Podlesny 32-yard field goal (6 plays, 61 yards, 2:16)	CIN 19–21
4	10:10	UGA	Jack Podlesny 53-yard field goal (8 plays, 44 yards, 1:25)	UGA 22–21
4	00:00	UGA	Safety	UGA 24–21

Statistics	UGA	CIN
First downs	19	16
Plays–yards	63–449	64–305
Rushes–yards	24–45	27–99
Passing yards	404	206
Passing: comp–att–int	27–39–1	24–37–0
Time of possession	28:36	31:24

Team	Category	Player	Statistics
UGA	Passing	JT Daniels	26/38, 392 yards, 1 TD, 1 INT
UGA	Rushing	Zamir White	11 carries, 41 yards, 1 TD
UGA	Receiving	George Pickens	7 receptions, 135 yards, 1 TD
CIN	Passing	Desmond Ridder	24/37, 206 yards, 2 TD
CIN	Rushing	Jerome Ford	8 carries, 98 yards, 1 TD
CIN	Receiving	Michael Young Jr.	4 receptions, 59 yards

== Personnel ==
=== Roster and staff ===
2020 Cincinnati Bearcats football team roster
Players
Coaches
Offense

Pos.	#	Name	Class
RB	0	Charles McClelland	So
WR	1	Blue Smith	So
WR	2	Jayshon Jackson	Jr
QB	3	Evan Prater	Fr
WR	5	Jordan Jones	Sr
WR	8	Michael Young Jr.	Jr
QB	9	Desmond Ridder	Jr
TE	11	Leonard Taylor	Jr
WR	12	Alec Pierce	Jr
WR	13	Dalrone Donaldson	Jr
QB	14	Jack Perry	So
WR	15	Garyn Prater	Jr
QB	16	Michael Lindauer	Fr
WR	17	Marquez Bell	Fr
TE	18	Cameron Jones	Fr
WR	20	Jadon Thompson	Fr
WR	21	Tre Tucker	So
WR	21	Tyler Scott	Fr
RB	22	Ryan Montgomery	So
RB	23	Gerrid Doaks	Sr
RB	24	Jerome Ford	So
RB	25	Cameron Young	Sr
WR	27	Norman Love	Fr
WR	29	Ashton Koller	Fr
RB	30	Michael Kopaygorodsky	Jr
WR	31	Nate Meyer	Fr
WR	32	Jiair Thomas	Fr
RB	33	Ethan Wright	Fr
TE	47	Nate Lawler	So
OL	50	Dylan O'Quinn	So
OL	51	Lorenz Metz	So
OL	52	Jakari Robinson	Jr
OL	53	Gavin Gerhardt	Fr
OL	55	James Hudson	Jr
OL	56	Jake Renfro	Fr
OL	57	Ben Blevins	Fr
OL	58	Darius Harper	Sr
OL	60	Joe Huber	Fr
OL	62	Zach Hummel	Fr
OL	64	Jake Burns	Fr
OL	65	Cody Lamb	Jr
OL	66	Ethan Voelker	So
OL	67	Jaxon Smith	Fr
OL	68	Kobe McAllister	Fr
OL	70	Joey Groeber	So
OL	71	Colin Woodside	So
OL	72	Jonathan Allen	Fr
OL	73	CJ Johnson	So
OL	74	Jeremy Cooper	So
OL	75	John Williams	Fr
OL	76	Marcelo Mendiola	Fr
OL	77	Vincent McConnell	Jr
WR	80	Chris Scott	Fr
TE	81	Josh Whyle	So
TE	82	Noah Davis	Sr
WR	84	Wyatt Fischer	So
TE	86	Jack Campbell	Fr
TE	87	Bruno Labelle	Sr
TE	88	Payten Singletary	Fr
WR	89	Bryant Johnson II	Fr

Defense

Pos.	#	Name	Class
S	1	James Wiggins	Sr
LB	2	Wilson Huber	Jr
S	3	Ja'von Hicks	Jr
CB	4	Justin Harris	So
S	5	Darrick Forrest	Sr
S	6	Bryan Cook	Sr
CB	7	Coby Bryant	Sr
LB	8	Jarell White	Sr
CB	9	Arquon Bush	So
LB	10	Brody Ingle	So
CB	11	Sammy Anderson	Fr
CB	12	Sauce Gardner	So
LB	13	Ty Van Fossen	So
CB	14	Todd Bumphis	Fr
CB	15	Taj Ward	So
LB	17	Dorian Holloway	Fr
CB	18	Josiah Robey	Jr
DE	19	Ethan Tucky	Sr
LB	20	Deshawn Pace	Fr
DE	21	Myjai Sanders	Jr
CB	22	DeArre McDonald	Fr
LB	23	Daved Jones Jr	Fr
LB	24	Jaheim Thomas	Fr
DE	25	Harrison Hill	Jr
CB	26	Phil Thomas	Fr
LB	27	Darrian Beavers	Sr
S	29	Jacob Dingle	So
CB	30	Alex Green	Fr
CB	31	Casey Kirk	Jr
S	32	James Camden	Fr
DE	33	Blake Bacevich	So
DT	34	Justin Wodtly	Fr
LB	35	Ryan Royer	Jr
S	36	Will Adams	So
DE	37	Steven Hawthorne	Fr
S	38	Jackson Welcsh	Fr
S	39	Ja'Quan Sheppard	So
LB	40	DeMarco Baker	So
LB	41	Joel Dublanko	Sr
DE	42	Malik Vann	Jr
DE	43	Michael Pitts	Sr
LB	44	Mick Oakes	So
DT	45	Barak Faulk	Fr
LB	46	Grant Horvath	Fr
LB	50	Jackson Bruscianelli	Fr
DT	52	Daeshon Martin	So
DE	54	Izaiah Ruffin	Fr
DE	57	Ryan Mullaney	Fr
DE	89	Sterling Miles	Fr
DT	90	Jabari Taylor	Jr
DL	91	Miles Manigualt	Fr
DT	92	Curtis Brooks	Sr
DT	93	Elijah Ponder	Sr
DT	94	Chase Brown	So
DL	95	Cole Pelgen	Fr
DT	96	Dominique Perry	Fr
DT	97	Eric Phillips	Fr
DE	98	Mychal Keys	So
DT	99	Marcus Brown	Sr

Special teams }

Pos.	#	Name	Class
K	16	Luke Lundberg	Fr
K	19	Cole Smith	Jr
P	37	James Smith	Sr
K	39	Bryce Burton	Fr
LS	74	Blake Bammann	So
K	91	Alex Bales	Fr
LS	96	Cayson Pfeiffer	Fr

Head coach

- Luke Fickell (Ohio State) – 4th year

Coordinators/assistant coaches

- Dan Enos (Michigan State)
  1st year – (Associate head coach/ running backs)
- Mike Denbrock (Grand Valley State)
  4th year – (offensive coordinator/ tight ends)
- Marcus Freeman (Ohio State)
  4th year – (defensive coordinator/ linebackers)
- Gino Guidugli (Cincinnati)
  4th year – (passing game coordinator/ quarterbacks)
- Brian Mason (Denison)
  3rd year – (special teams coordinator)
- Mike Brown (Liberty)
  2nd year – (wide receivers)
- Ron Crook (West Liberty State)
  4th year – (offensive line)
- Perry Eliano (Stephen F. Austin)
  1st year – (cornerbacks)
- Colin Hitschler (Pennsylvania)
  1st year – (safeties)
- Greg Scruggs (Louisville)
  1st year – (defensive line)

Legend

- (C) Team captain
- (S) Suspended
- (I) Ineligible
- Injured
- Redshirt

Roster
Last update: August 26, 2020

=== Depth chart ===
Defense

NK
Arquon Bush
Taj Ward

FS
James Wiggins
Bryan Cook

WLB	MLB	SLB
Darrian Beavers	Joel Dublanko	Jarell White
Brody Ingle	Wilson Huber	Ty Van Fossen; OR Deshawn Pace

SS
Darrick Forrest
Ja'von Hicks
Jacob Dingle

CB
Coby Bryant
Justin Harris

DE	NT	DE
Myjai Sanders	Curtis Brooks	Elijah Ponder
Malik Vann	Marcus Brown; OR Jabari Taylor	Ethan Tucky; OR Michael Pitts

CB
Sauce Gardner
Ja'Quan Sheppard

Offense

WR
Michael Young Jr.
Tyler Scott

WR
Alec Pierce
OR Jordan Jones

LT	LG	C	RG	RT
James Hudson	Dylan O’Quinn; OR Jeremy Cooper	Jake Renfro; OR Jakari Robinson	Vincent McConnell	Darius Harper
Lorenz Metz		Zach Hummel	Colin Woodside	John Williams

TE
Leonard Taylor
Josh Whyle
OR Cam Jones

WR
Jayshon Jackson
Tre Tucker
Jadon Thompson

QB
Desmond Ridder

RB
Gerrid Doaks
Jerome Ford
OR Ryan Montgomery

== Rankings ==
Ranking movements Legend: ██ Increase in ranking ██ Decrease in ranking
	Week																	
Poll	Pre	1	2	3	4	5	6	7	8	9	10	11	12	13	14	15	16	Final
AP	20	20*	13	14	15	11	8	9	7	6	7	7	7	7	7	6	6	8
Coaches	22	22*	14	16	15	11	10	10	7	6	7	7	7	7	7	6	6	8
CFP	Not released												7	7	8	9	8	Not released

== Awards and milestones ==
American Athletic Conference Weekly Awards
Player	Award	Date Awarded	Ref.
Jarell White	Defensive Player of the Week	September 30, 2020	
Desmond Ridder	Offensive Player of the Week	October 26, 2020	
Desmond Ridder	Offensive Player of the Week	November 2, 2020	
Myjai Sanders	Defensive Player of the Week	November 2, 2020	
Desmond Ridder	Offensive Player of the Week	November 16, 2020	
Jarell White	Co-defensive Player of the Week	November 16, 2020	
Desmond Ridder	Co-offensive Player of the Week	November 23, 2020	

Walter Camp Football Foundation FBS Weekly Awards
Player	Award	Date Awarded	Ref.
Desmond Ridder	Offensive Player of the Week	October 25, 2020	
Jarell White	Defensive Player of the Week	November 15, 2020	

Individual Awards
Award	Recipient	Ref.
AAC Offensive Player of the Year	Desmond Ridder	
AAC Coach of the Year	Luke Fickell	

NCAA Recognized All-American
Player	AP	AFCA	FWAA	TSN	WCFF
Sauce Gardner	2	2	1		
James Wiggins	2				
The NCAA recognizes a selection to all five of the AP, AFCA, FWAA, TSN and WCFF first teams for unanimous selections and three of five for consensus selections.

Other All-American Honors
Player	Athletic	Athlon	BR	CBS Sports	CFN	ESPN	Fox Sports	Phil Steele	SI	USA Today	Ref.
Sauce Gardner	2							1		1	
James Wiggins	1							4			

All-AAC
Player	Position	Team
James Hudson	OT	1
Desmond Ridder	QB	1
Gerrid Doaks	RB	1
Myjai Sanders	DL	1
Jarell White	LB	1
Sauce Gardner	CB	1
Coby Bryant	CB	1
James Wiggins	S	1
Michael Young Jr.	WR	2
Josh Whyle	TE	2
Marcus Brown	DL	2
Elijah Ponder	DL	2
Darrian Beavers	LB	2
James Smith	P	2
Tre Tucker	RS	2
Darrick Forrest	S	HM
Darius Harper	OT	HM

== Players drafted into the NFL ==
Round	Pick	Player	Position	NFL Club
4	110	James Hudson	OT	Cleveland Browns
5	163	Darrick Forrest	S	Washington Football Team
7	243	James Wiggins	S	Arizona Cardinals
7	244	Gerrid Doaks	RB	Miami Dolphins
