= 2020 South Florida Bulls football team =

American college football season

2020 South Florida Bulls football
- Conference: American Athletic Conference
- Record: 1–8 (0–7 AAC)
- Head coach: Jeff Scott (1st season)
- Offensive coordinator: Charlie Weis Jr. (1st season)
- Offensive scheme: Spread
- Defensive coordinator: Glenn Spencer (1st season)
- Base defense: 4–2–5
- Home stadium: Raymond James Stadium

2020 American Athletic Conference football standings
	Conf.			Overall
Team	W		L	W		L
No. 8 Cincinnati y$	6	–	0	9	–	1
Tulsa y	6	–	0	6	–	3
Memphis	5	–	3	8	–	3
UCF	5	–	3	6	–	4
SMU	4	–	3	7	–	3
Houston	3	–	3	3	–	5
Navy	3	–	4	3	–	7
Tulane	3	–	5	6	–	6
East Carolina	3	–	5	3	–	6
Temple	1	–	6	1	–	6
South Florida	0	–	7	1	–	8
Championship: Cincinnati 27, Tulsa 24
$ – Conference champion; y – Championship game participant; Rankings from AP Poll.

The 2020 South Florida Bulls football team represented the University of South Florida (USF) during the 2020 NCAA Division I FBS football season. The Bulls were led by first-year head coach Jeff Scott and played their home games at Raymond James Stadium in Tampa, Florida. They competed as members of the American Athletic Conference.

== Schedule ==
The 2020 South Florida Schedule was initially released on February 24, 2020.

The Bulls had games scheduled against Texas, Bethune–Cookman. and Nevada all canceled due to the COVID-19 pandemic.

Date	Time	Opponent	Site	TV	Result	Attendance
September 12	7:00 p.m.	The Citadel*	Raymond James Stadium; Tampa, FL	ESPNU	W 27–6	0
September 19	2:30 p.m.	at No. 7 Notre Dame*	Notre Dame Stadium; South Bend, IN	USA	L 0–52	10,085
October 3	3:30 p.m.	at No. 15 Cincinnati	Nippert Stadium; Cincinnati, OH	ESPN+	L 7–28	0
October 10	7:00 p.m.	East Carolina^{†}	Raymond James Stadium; Tampa, FL	ESPN+	L 24–44	6,799
October 17	12:00 p.m.	at Temple	Lincoln Financial Field; Philadelphia, PA	ESPN+	L 37–39	782
October 23	7:30 p.m.	Tulsa	Raymond James Stadium; Tampa, FL	ESPN	L 13–42	5,142
November 7	12:00 p.m.	at Memphis	Liberty Bowl Memorial Stadium; Memphis, TN	ESPN+	L 33–34	10,300
November 14	3:30 p.m.	at Houston	TDECU Stadium; Houston, TX	ESPN2	L 21–56	8,266
November 27	3:30 p.m.	UCF	Raymond James Stadium; Tampa, FL (War on I-4)	ESPN	L 46–58	8,801
*Non-conference game; ^{†}Homecoming; Rankings from AP Poll and CFP Rankings after November 24 released prior to game; All times are in Central time

== Personnel ==
=== Staff ===
Name	Position	Seasons at South Florida	Alma mater
Jeff Scott	Head Coach	1	Clemson (2003)
Allen Mogridge	Assistant Head Coach / Offensive Line	1	North Carolina (1999)
Charlie Weis Jr.	Offensive Coordinator / Quarterbacks	1	Kansas (2015)
Glenn Spencer	Defensive Coordinator / Linebackers	1	Georgia Tech (1987)
Daniel Da Prato	Special Teams Coordinator	1	Louisiana–Monroe (2003)
Da'Quan Bowers	Defensive Line	1	Clemson (2019)
Xavier Dye	Wide Receivers	1	Clemson (2010)
Joey King	Tight Ends	1	Carson–Newman (2005)
Jules Montinar	Cornerbacks / Recruiting Coordinator	1	Eastern Kentucky (2009)
Wes Neighbors	Safeties	1	Alabama (2011)
Pat White	Running Backs	1	West Virginia (2008)
Brad Scott	Chief of Staff	1	South Florida (1979)
Trumain Carroll	Director of Football Strength & Conditioning	1	Oklahoma State (2005)
Brandon Roberts	Assistant Strength & Conditioning Coach	1	Middle Tennessee State (2009)

== Game summaries ==
=== The Citadel ===
The Citadel at South Florida

Team	1	2	3	4	Total
Bulldogs	3	3	0	0	6
• Bulls	7	13	0	7	27

- Date: September 12, 2020
- Location: Raymond James Stadium
  Tampa, FL
- Game start: 7:00 p.m. EDT
- Elapsed time: 3 hours and 7 minutes
- Game attendance: 0
- Referee: Tim Rich
- TV announcers (ESPNU): Lincoln Rose (play-by-play) and Stanford Routt (analyst)

Scoring summary
1	04:07	CIT	Colby Kinter 45-yard field goal (10 plays, 38 yards, 4:16)	CIT 3–0
1	00:49	USF	DeVontres Dukes 10-yard pass from Jordan McCloud (Spencer Shrader kick) (8 plays, 62 yards, 3:18)	USF 7–3
2	11:08	CIT	Colby Kinter 41-yard field goal (10 plays, 54 yards, 4:41)	USF 7–6
2	06:52	USF	Omarion Dollison 0-yard punt returned (Spencer Shrader PAT failed) (3 plays, −6 yards, 1:31)	USF 13–6
2	02:41	USF	Noah Johnson 9-yard rush (Spencer Shrader kick) (5 plays, 60 yards, 2:44)	USF 20–6
4	06:55	USF	Kelley Jonier 3-yard rush (Spencer Shrader kick) (7 plays, 86 yards, 2:59)	USF 27–6

Statistics	The Citadel	South Florida
First downs	16	20
Total yards	284	404
Rushing yards	200	302
Passing yards	84	102
Turnovers	0	3
Time of possession	32:17	27:43

Team	Category	Player	Statistics
The Citadel	Passing	Brandon Rainey	4/18, 84 yards, 1 INT
The Citadel	Rushing	Brandon Rainey	20 carries, 65 yards
The Citadel	Receiving	Ryan McCarthy	2 receptions, 44 yards
South Florida	Passing	Jordan McCloud	11/16, 68 yards, 1 TD, 1 INT
South Florida	Rushing	Kelley Joiner	8 carries, 87 yards, 1 TD
South Florida	Receiving	Bryce Miller	3 receptions, 36 yards

=== At Notre Dame ===
South Florida at Notre Dame

Team	1	2	3	4	Total
Bulls	0	0	0	0	0
• No. 7 Fighting Irish	14	21	10	7	52

- Date: September 19, 2020
- Location: Notre Dame Stadium
  South Bend, IN
- Game start: 2:39 p.m. EDT
- Elapsed time: 3 hours and 7 minutes
- Game attendance: 10,085
- Game weather: 62 °F (17 °C) • Weather: Sunny • Wind: 4 E MPH
- Referee: Marcus Woods
- TV announcers (USA Network): Paul Burmeister (play–by–play), Tony Dungy (analyst), and Jac Collinsworth (sideline reporter)

Scoring summary
1	12:05	ND	Ian Book 4-yard rush (Jonathan Doerer kick) (7 plays, 54 yards, 2:55)	ND 7–0
1	07:06	ND	Chris Tyree 1-yard rush (Jonathan Doerer kick) (7 plays, 43 yards, 3:24)	ND 14–0
2	14:25	ND	Ian Book 1-yard rush (Jonathan Doerer kick) (11 plays, 58 yards, 5:07)	ND 21–0
2	11:15	ND	C'Bo Flemister 26-yard rush (Jonathan Doerer kick) (5 plays, 53 yards, 1:57)	ND 28–0
2	01:55	ND	Ian Book 1-yard rush (Jonathan Doerer kick) (4 plays, 25 yards, 0:54)	ND 35–0
3	06:34	ND	Jonathan Doerer 22-yard field goal (10 plays, 60 yards, 3:21)	ND 38–0
3	03:23	ND	Jordan Botelho 1-yard blocked punt returned (Jonathan Doerer kick) (6 plays, 27 yards, 3:11)	ND 45–0
4	02:15	ND	Jafar Armstrong 5-yard rush (Dawson Goepferich kick) (10 plays, 66 yards, 7:00)	ND 52–0

Statistics	South Florida	Notre Dame
First downs	11	21
Total yards	231	429
Rushing yards	106	281
Passing yards	125	148
Turnovers	0	0
Time of possession	27:33	32:27

Team	Category	Player	Statistics
South Florida	Passing	Jordan McCloud	8/14, 64 yards
South Florida	Rushing	Johnny Ford	6 carries, 70 yards
South Florida	Receiving	Latrell Williams	2 receptions, 48 yards
Notre Dame	Passing	Ian Book	12/19, 143 yards
Notre Dame	Rushing	C'Bo Flemister	13 carries, 127 yards, 1 TD
Notre Dame	Receiving	Tommy Tremble	3 receptions, 60 yards

=== At Cincinnati ===
South Florida at Cincinnati

Team	1	2	3	4	Total
Bulls	0	0	7	0	7
• No. 15 Bearcats	7	7	14	0	28

- Date: October 3, 2020
- Location: Nippert Stadium
  Cincinnati, OH
- Game start: 3:35 p.m. EDT
- Elapsed time: 3 hours and 15 minutes
- Game attendance: 0
- Game weather: 63 °F (17 °C) • Weather: Mostly Cloudy • Wind: 6 SW MPH
- Referee: Hank Johns
- TV announcers (ESPN+): David Saltzman (play–by–play) and Keith Moreland (analyst)

Scoring summary
1	04:28	CIN	Gerrid Doaks 10-yard rush (Cole Smith kick) (13 plays, 92 yards, 6:02)	CIN 7–0
2	00:39	CIN	Josh Whyle 13-yard pass from Desmond Ridder (Cole Smith kick) (11 plays, 65 yards, 4:53)	CIN 14–0
3	04:01	CIN	Bruno Labelle 3-yard pass from Desmond Ridder (Cole Smith kick) (8 plays, 67 yards, 4:10)	CIN 21–0
3	00:49	USF	Johnny Ford 2-yard rush (Jared Sackett kick) (10 plays, 65 yards, 3:06)	CIN 21–7
3	00:36	CIN	Tre Tucker 97-yard kickoff returned (Cole Smith kick) (0 plays, 0 yards, 0:00)	CIN 28–7

Statistics	South Florida	Cincinnati
First downs	19	22
Total yards	291	332
Rushing yards	83	189
Passing yards	208	143
Turnovers	5	4
Time of possession	23:36	36:24

Team	Category	Player	Statistics
South Florida	Passing	Jordan McCloud	12/21, 137 yards, 2 INTs
South Florida	Rushing	Leonard Parker	7 carries, 51 yards
South Florida	Receiving	DeVontres Dukes	3 receptions, 47 yards
Cincinnati	Passing	Desmond Ridder	16/26, 143 yards, 2 TDs, 3 INTs
Cincinnati	Rushing	Gerrid Doaks	22 carries, 102 yards, 1 TD
Cincinnati	Receiving	Jayshon Jackson	3 receptions, 47 yards

=== East Carolina ===
East Carolina at South Florida

Team	1	2	3	4	Total
• Pirates	17	14	7	6	44
Bulls	7	10	0	7	24

- Date: October 10, 2020
- Location: Raymond James Stadium
  Tampa, FL
- Game start: 7:00 p.m. EDT
- Elapsed time: 3 hours and 10 minutes
- Game attendance: 6,799
- Referee: Anthony Calabre
- TV announcers (ESPN+): Lincoln Rose (play–by–play) and Stanford Routt (analyst)

Scoring summary
1	10:35	ECU	Jake Verity 25-yard field goal (11 plays, 67 yards, 4:25)	ECU 3–0
1	08:58	USF	Johnny Ford 8-yard rush (Kenny Scribner kick) (6 plays, 65 yards, 1:37)	USF 7–3
1	03:50	ECU	Darius Pinnix 2-yard pass from Holton Ahlers (Jake Verity kick) (12 plays, 59 yards, 5:08)	ECU 10–7
1	00:16	ECU	C. J. Johnson 75-yard pass from Holton Ahlers (Jake Verity kick) (3 plays, 78 yards, 1:16)	ECU 17–7
2	13:18	ECU	Rahjai Harris 42-yard rush (Jake Verity kick) (1 play, 42 yards, 0:08)	ECU 24–7
2	04:59	USF	Johnny Ford 7-yard rush (Kenny Scribner kick) (5 plays, 80 yards, 1:55)	ECU 24–14
2	02:17	ECU	Rahjai Harris 10-yard rush (Jake Verity kick) (1 play, 10 yards, 0:05)	ECU 31–14
2	00:32	USF	Jared Sackett 31-yard field goal (11 plays, 61 yards, 1:45)	ECU 31–17
3	00:10	ECU	C. J. Johnson 14-yard pass from Holton Ahlers (Jake Verity kick) (8 plays, 50 yards, 4:23)	ECU 38–17
4	13:20	ECU	Jake Verity 42-yard field goal (4 plays, 6 yards, 1:33)	ECU 41–17
4	03:14	ECU	Jake Verity 37-yard field goal (15 plays, 54 yards, 8:46)	ECU 44–17
4	00:31	USF	Noah Johnson 15-yard rush (Jared Sackett kick) (7 plays, 54 yards, 2:43)	ECU 44–24

Statistics	East Carolina	South Florida
First downs	21	22
Total yards	432	398
Rushing yards	210	92
Passing yards	222	306
Turnovers	0	2
Time of possession	35:36	24:24

Team	Category	Player	Statistics
East Carolina	Passing	Holton Ahlers	17/26, 222 yards, 3 TDs
East Carolina	Rushing	Rahjai Harris	19 carries, 115 yards, 1 TD
East Carolina	Receiving	C. J. Johnson	3 receptions, 99 yards, 2 TDs
South Florida	Passing	Jordan McCloud	26/35, 298 yards
South Florida	Rushing	Johnny Ford	8 carries, 44 yards, 2 TDs
South Florida	Receiving	Latrell Williams	8 receptions, 93 yards

=== At Temple ===
South Florida at Temple

Team	1	2	3	4	Total
Bulls	7	14	10	6	37
• Owls	10	7	9	13	39

- Date: October 17, 2020
- Location: Lincoln Financial Field
  Philadelphia, PA
- Game start: 12:05 p.m. EDT
- Elapsed time: 3 hours and 32 minutes
- Game attendance: 782
- Game weather: 55 °F (13 °C) • Weather: Sunny • Wind: NNW 9 MPH
- Referee: Luke Richmond
- TV announcers (ESPN+): Dave Leno (play–by–play) and Ken Dunek (analyst)

Scoring summary
1	10:10	TEM	Jadan Blue 5-yard pass from Anthony Russo (Will Mobley kick) (8 plays, 50 yards, 2:57)	TEM 7–0
1	08:26	TEM	Will Mobley 24-yard field goal (4 plays, 5 yards, 1:10)	TEM 10–0
1	04:34	USF	Randall St. Felix 13-yard pass from Jordan McCloud (Jared Sackett kick) (10 plays, 49 yards, 3:44)	TEM 10–7
2	09:39	USF	DeVontres Dukes 28-yard pass from Jordan McCloud (Jared Sackett kick) (10 plays, 95 yards, 3:20)	USF 14–10
2	05:16	TEM	Jadan Blue 13-yard pass from Anthony Russo (Will Mobley kick) (11 plays, 73 yards, 4:17)	TEM 17–14
2	01:18	USF	Noah Johnson 2-yard rush (Jared Sackett kick) (4 plays, 35 yards, 0:59)	USF 21–17
3	08:14	TEM	Will Mobley 26-yard field goal (16 plays, 66 yards, 6:46)	USF 21–20
3	05:39	USF	Johnny Ford 13-yard pass from Jordan McCloud (Jared Sackett kick) (8 plays, 46 yards, 2:24)	USF 28–20
3	03:16	USF	Jared Sackett 29-yard field goal (4 plays, −2 yards, 1:01)	USF 31–20
3	01:07	TEM	Branden Mack 12-yard pass from Anthony Russo (two-point conversion pass attempt failed) (7 plays, 57 yards, 2:09)	USF 31–26
4	09:52	TEM	Arnold Ebiketie 11-yard fumble returned (two-point conversion rush attempt failed) (4 plays, 8 yards, 1:37)	TEM 32–31
4	04:28	TEM	Randle Jones 13-yard pass from Anthony Russo (Will Mobley kick) (11 plays, 81 yards, 3:47)	TEM 39–31
4	01:03	USF	Leonard Parker 1-yard rush (two-point conversion rush attempt failed) (12 plays, 72 yards, 3:21)	TEM 39–37

Statistics	South Florida	Temple
First downs	21	32
Total yards	324	416
Rushing yards	143	146
Passing yards	181	270
Turnovers	3	2
Time of possession	27:39	32:21

Team	Category	Player	Statistics
South Florida	Passing	Jordan McCloud	15/26, 182 yards, 3 TDs
South Florida	Rushing	Johnny Ford	15 carries, 68 yards
South Florida	Receiving	Omarion Dollison	4 receptions, 64 yards
Temple	Passing	Anthony Russo	30/42, 270 yards, 4 TDs, 2 INTs
Temple	Rushing	Re'Mahn Davis	25 carries, 83 yards
Temple	Receiving	Randle Jones	8 receptions, 81 yards, 1 TD

=== Tulsa ===
Tulsa at South Florida

Team	1	2	3	4	Total
• Golden Hurricane	7	14	21	0	42
Bulls	6	0	7	0	13

- Date: October 10, 2020
- Location: Raymond James Stadium
  Tampa, FL
- Game start: 7:30 p.m. EDT
- Elapsed time: 3 hours 25 minutes
- Game attendance: 5,142
- Referee: Charles Lamerti
- TV announcers (ESPN): Jason Benetti (play–by–play), Andre Ware (analyst), and Paul Carcaterra (sideline reporter)

Scoring summary
1	12:10	TUL	JuanCarlos Santana 33 Yd pass from Zach Smith (Zack Long Kick) (4 plays, 65 yards, 1:05)	TUL 7–0
1	09:59	USF	Jared Sackett 39 Yd Field Goal (6 plays, 17 yards, 1:20)	TUL 7–3
1	06:57	USF	Jared Sackett 25 Yd Field Goal (4 plays, 1 yard, 1:18)	TUL 7–6
2	12:23	TUL	Corey Taylor II 5 Yd Run (Zack Long Kick) (10 plays, 73 yards, 4:34)	TUL 14–6
2	04:54	TUL	Deneric Prince 27 Yd Run (Zack Long Kick) (12 plays, 80 yards, 4:43)	TUL 21–6
3	08:43	USF	Bryce Miller 4 Yd pass from Noah Johnson (Jared Sackett Kick) (10 plays, 72 yards, 4:57)	TUL 21–13
3	07:26	TUL	Deneric Prince 62 Yd Run (Zack Long Kick) (3 plays, 75 yards, 1:17)	TUL 28–13
3	05:56	TUL	Zaven Collins 38 Yd Interception Return (Zack Long Kick) (3 plays, 4 yards, 1:30)	TUL 35–13
3	02:21	TUL	Corey Taylor II 1 Yd Run (Zack Long Kick) (7 plays, 56 yards, 2:12)	TUL 42–13

Statistics	Tulsa	South Florida
First downs	21	17
Total yards	462	305
Rushing yards	227	122
Passing yards	235	183
Turnovers	1	3
Time of possession	28:33	31:27

Team	Category	Player	Statistics
Tulsa	Passing	Zach Smith	16/24, 233 yards, 1 TD, 1 INT
Tulsa	Rushing	Deneric Prince	15 carries, 109 yards, 2 TDs
Tulsa	Receiving	Sam Crawford Jr.	4 receptions, 82 yards
South Florida	Passing	Noah Johnson	18/27, 150 yards, 1 TD, 1 INT
South Florida	Rushing	Cade Fortin	4 carries, 39 yards
South Florida	Receiving	Omarion Dollison	6 receptions, 54 yards

=== At Memphis ===
South Florida at Memphis

Team	1	2	3	4	Total
Bulls	3	24	3	3	33
• Tigers	6	7	7	14	34

- Date: November 7, 2020
- Location: Liberty Bowl Memorial Stadium
  Memphis, TN
- Game start: 11:05 a.m. CST
- Elapsed time: 3 hours and 14 minutes
- Game attendance: 10,300
- Game weather: 73 °F (23 °C) • Weather: Clear • Wind: SE 7 MPH
- Referee: Hank Johns
- TV announcers (ESPN+): Lincoln Rose (play–by–play) and LaDarrin McLane (analyst)

Scoring summary
1	12:19	USF	Spencer Shrader 49-yard field goal (4 plays, 2 yards, 1:23)	USF 3–0
1	07:32	MEM	Riley Patterson 52-yard field goal (5 plays, 31 yards, 1:37)	TIE 3–3
1	03:33	MEM	Riley Patterson 33-yard field goal (7 plays, 43 yards, 2:14)	MEM 6–3
2	14:18	USF	Spencer Shrader 47-yard field goal (11 plays, 46 yards, 4:15)	TIE 6–6
2	13:02	USF	Daquan Evans 51-yard interception returned (Jared Sackett kick) (3 plays, 10 yards, 1:09)	USF 13–6
2	11:33	MEM	Calvin Austin III 65-yard pass from Brady White (Riley Patterson kick) (3 plays, 69 yards, 1:23)	TIE 13–13
2	11:24	USF	Kelley Joiner Jr. 75-yard pass from Noah Johnson (Jared Sackett kick) (1 play, 75 yards, 0:09)	USF 20–13
2	03:52	USF	Mitchell Brinkman 3-yard pass from Noah Johnson (Jared Sackett kick) (7 plays, 63 yards, 3:05)	USF 27–13
3	08:52	MEM	Sean Dykes 5-yard pass from Brady White (Riley Patterson kick) (10 plays, 59 yards, 5:09)	USF 27–20
3	03:58	USF	Spencer Shrader 41-yard field goal (11 plays, 67 yards, 4:50)	USF 30–20
4	04:36	USF	Spencer Shrader 46-yard field goal (6 plays, 20 yards, 3:39)	USF 33–20
4	03:19	MEM	Sean Dykes 10-yard pass from Brady White (Riley Patterson kick) (7 plays, 72 yards, 1:17)	USF 33–27
4	01:03	MEM	Calvin Austin III 9-yard pass from Brady White (Riley Patterson kick) (8 plays, 76 yards, 1:20)	MEM 34–33

Statistics	South Florida	Memphis
First downs	16	24
Total yards	330	535
Rushing yards	113	98
Passing yards	217	437
Turnovers	0	1
Time of possession	29:25	30:35

Team	Category	Player	Statistics
South Florida	Passing	Noah Johnson	20–29, 217 yards, 2 TDs
South Florida	Rushing	Brian Battie	10 carries, 76 yards
South Florida	Receiving	Kelley Joiner	3 receptions, 78 yards, 1 TD
Memphis	Passing	Brady White	30–50, 437 yards, 4 TDs, 1 INT
Memphis	Rushing	Kylan Watkins	10 carries, 44 yards
Memphis	Receiving	Sean Dykes	7 receptions, 147 yards, 2 TDs

=== At Houston ===
South Florida at Houston

Team	1	2	3	4	Total
Bulls	0	0	7	14	21
• Cougars	14	14	14	14	56

- Date: November 14, 2020
- Location: TDECU Stadium
  Houston, TX
- Game start: 2:35 p.m. CST
- Elapsed time: 3 hours and 22 minutes
- Game attendance: 8,266
- Game weather: 83 °F (28 °C) • Weather: Partly Cloudy • Wind: S 10 MPH
- Referee: Charles Lamertina
- TV announcers (ESPN2/ESPN+): David Saltzman (play–by–play) and Stanford Routt (analyst)

Scoring summary
1	14:04	HOU	Bryson Smith 28-yard pass from Clayton Tune (Kyle Ramsey kick) (3 plays, 75 yards, 0:56)	HOU 7–0
1	02:05	HOU	Clayton Tune 26-yard rush (Kyle Ramsey kick) (6 plays, 80 yards, 3:05)	HOU 14–0
2	10:06	HOU	Clayton Tune 13-yard rush (Kyle Ramsey kick) (6 plays, 56 yards, 2:19)	HOU 21–0
2	07:16	HOU	Keith Corbin 33-yard pass from Clayton Tune (Kyle Ramsey kick) (3 plays, 53 yards, 1:05)	HOU 28–0
3	13:51	HOU	Marcus Jones 72-yard punt returned (Kyle Ramsey kick) (3 plays, 4 yards, 1:09)	HOU 35–0
3	06:07	HOU	Derek Parish 85-yard fumble returned (Kyle Ramsey kick) (10 plays, 49 yards, 3:59)	HOU 42–0
3	03:37	USF	Leonard Parker 2-yard rush (Spencer Shrader kick) (6 plays, 75 yards, 2:30)	HOU 42–7
4	11:50	USF	Omarion Dollison 2-yard pass from Jordan McCloud (Spencer Shrader kick) (11 plays, 83 yards, 4:25)	HOU 42–14
4	10:22	USF	Bentlee Sanders 38-yard interception returned (Spencer Shrader kick) (3 plays, 9 yards, 1:28)	HOU 42–21
4	05:35	HOU	Christian Trahan 6-yard pass from Clayton Tune (Kyle Ramsey kick) (7 plays, 75 yards, 5:00)	HOU 49–21
4	05:15	HOU	James Fullbright III 14-yard rush (Kyle Ramsey kick) (1 play, 14 yards, 0:07)	HOU 56–21

Statistics	South Florida	Houston
First downs	23	25
Total yards	359	505
Rushing yards	136	319
Passing yards	223	186
Turnovers	2	1
Time of possession	31:01	28:59

Team	Category	Player	Statistics
South Florida	Passing	Jordan McCloud	14–29, 180 yards, 1TD
South Florida	Rushing	Brian Battie	13 carries, 86 yards
South Florida	Receiving	Bryce Miller	5 receptions, 53 yards
Houston	Passing	Clayton Tune	14–25, 165 yards, 3 TDs, 1 INT
Houston	Rushing	Clayton Tune	10 carries, 120 yards, 2TDs
Houston	Receiving	Keith Corbin	4 receptions, 67 yards, 1 TD

=== UCF ===
UCF at South Florida

Team	1	2	3	4	Total
• Knights	14	17	14	13	58
Bulls	7	7	14	18	46

- Date: November 27, 2020
- Location: Raymond James Stadium
  Tampa, FL
- Game start: 3:30 p.m. EST
- Elapsed time: 4 hours and 13 minutes
- Game attendance: 8,801
- Referee: Hank Johns
- TV announcers (ESPN): Roy Philpott (play–by–play) and Kelly Stouffer (analyst)

Scoring summary
1	07:37	USF	DeVontres Dukes 23-yard pass from Jordan McCloud (Spencer Shrader kick) (8 plays, 80 yards, 1:54)	USF 7–0
1	05:07	UCF	Bentavious Thompson 27-yard rush (Daniel Obarski kick) (8 plays, 75 yards, 2:30)	TIE 7–7
1	00:25	UCF	Jake Hescock 1-yard pass from Dillon Gabriel (Daniel Obarski kick) (11 plays, 78 yards, 3:31)	UCF 14–7
2	13:09	UCF	Jacob Harris 20-yard rush (Daniel Obarski kick) (2 plays, 71 yards, 0:23)	UCF 21–7
2	06:14	UCF	Jacob Harris 25-yard pass from Dillon Gabriel (Daniel Obarski kick) (7 plays, 49 yards, 1:34)	UCF 28–7
2	02:29	USF	Bryce Miller 5-yard pass from Jordan McCloud (Spencer Shrader kick) (11 plays, 75 yards, 3:45)	UCF 28–14
2	00:09	UCF	Daniel Obarski 23-yard field goal (10 plays, 69 yards, 2:20)	UCF 31–14
3	07:57	UCF	Jordan McCloud 3-yard rush (Spencer Shrader kick) (9 plays, 80 yards, 3:15)	UCF 31–21
3	06:32	UCF	Jacob Harris 47-yard pass from Dillon Gabriel (Daniel Obarski kick) (4 plays, 69 yards, 1:25)	UCF 38–21
3	02:19	USF	DeVontres Dukes 14-yard pass from Jordan McCloud (Spencer Shrader kick) (11 plays, 86 yards, 4:13)	UCF 38–28
3	01:13	UCF	Dillon Gabriel 12-yard rush (Daniel Obarski kick) (4 plays, 45 yards, 1:06)	UCF 45–28
4	12:21	USF	Jared Sackett 30-yard field goal (10 plays, 62 yards, 3:52)	UCF 45–31
4	10:10	USF	Brian Battie 1-yard rush (Spencer Shrader kick) (3 plays, 48 yards, 0:57)	UCF 45–38
4	06:34	UCF	Greg McCrae 20-yard rush (Daniel Obarski kick) (5 plays, 40 yards, 2:27)	UCF 52–38
4	01:40	UCF	Bentavious Thompson 2-yard rush (Daniel Obarski PAT failed) (6 plays, 34 yards, 3:51)	UCF 58–38
4	00:14	USF	Bryce Miller 19-yard pass from Jordan McCloud (Jordan McCloud two-point conversion rush) (4 plays, 60 yards, 1:26)	UCF 58–46

Statistics	UCF	South Florida
First downs	28	38
Total yards	577	646
Rushing yards	241	242
Passing yards	336	404
Turnovers	1	2
Time of possession	26:41	33:19

Team	Category	Player	Statistics
UCF	Passing	Dillon Gabriel	22-36, 336 yards, 4TDs, 1 INT
UCF	Rushing	Greg McCrae	25 carries, 130 yards, 1 TD
UCF	Receiving	Jacob Harris	5 receptions, 110 yards, 3 TDs
South Florida	Passing	Jordan McCloud	32-46, 404 yards, 4TDs
South Florida	Rushing	Kelley Joiner	14 carries, 116 yards
South Florida	Receiving	Bryce Miller	11 receptions, 121 yards, 2 TDs

== Rankings ==
Ranking movements Legend: ██ Increase in ranking ██ Decrease in ranking — = Not ranked RV = Received votes
	Week															
Poll	Pre	1	2	3	4	5	6	7	8	9	10	11	12	13	14	Final
AP	—	—*	RV	—	—	—	—	—	—	—	—	—	—	—		
Coaches	—	—*	RV	—	—	—	—	—	—	—	—	—	—	—		
CFP	Not released													—		Not released
