= 2020 Peach Bowl =

The 2020 Peach Bowl may refer to one of the following college football bowl games:

- 2019 Peach Bowl, played between the Oklahoma Sooners and the LSU Tigers.
- 2021 Peach Bowl (January), played between the Georgia Bulldogs and the Cincinnati Bearcats.
