= Luke Fickell =

American football player and coach (born 1973)

- Fickell in 2024

Current position
- Title: Head coach
- Team: Wisconsin
- Conference: Big Ten
- Record: 24–25

Biographical details
- Born: August 18, 1973 (age 53); Columbus, Ohio, U.S.
- Education: Ohio State University

Playing career
- 1993–1996: Ohio State
- 1997: New Orleans Saints
- Position: Nose guard

Coaching career (HC unless noted)
- 1999: Ohio State (GA)
- 2000–2001: Akron (DL)
- 2002–2003: Ohio State (ST)
- 2004: Ohio State (LB)
- 2005–2010: Ohio State (co-DC/LB)
- 2011: Ohio State (interim HC)
- 2012–2016: Ohio State (co-DC/LB)
- 2017–2022: Cincinnati
- 2022–present: Wisconsin

Head coaching record
- Overall: 87–50
- Bowls: 3–4
- Tournaments: 0–1 (CFP)

Accomplishments and honors

Championships
- 2 AAC (2020, 2021); 1 AAC East Division (2019)

Awards
- Home Depot Coach of the Year (2021); AFCA Coach of the Year Award (2021); Sporting News Coach of the Year (2021); Bobby Dodd Coach of the Year (2021); Eddie Robinson Coach of the Year (2021); Paul "Bear" Bryant Award (2021); 3× AAC Coach of the Year (2018, 2020–2021); AFCA Assistant Coach of the Year (2010); 2× Second-team All-Big Ten (1995, 1996)

Luke Joseph Fickell (born August 18, 1973) is an American college football coach and former player. He is the head football coach for the University of Wisconsin–Madison, a position he has held since 2022. Previously he was the head coach at the University of Cincinnati, a position he held from 2016 through 2022. Fickell played college football as a nose guard at Ohio State University from 1993 to 1996 and then was an assistant coach for the Buckeyes. He was interim head coach at Ohio State for the entire 2011 season.

== Playing career ==
Fickell started his playing career at St. Francis DeSales High School, where he was a two-time first-team All-Ohio defensive tackle as well as a three-time state champion in wrestling. After redshirting for the Buckeyes in 1992, Fickell was a standout defensive player, making a school-record 50 consecutive starts at the nose guard position from 1993 to 1996. In his freshman year, he lined up next to Dan Wilkinson. Despite having a torn pectoral muscle, Fickell started the 1997 Rose Bowl, making two tackles in the Buckeyes' victory over Arizona State. After graduating from Ohio State in 1997, Fickell signed as an undrafted free agent with the New Orleans Saints of the National Football League (NFL). After tearing his ACL, he spent the remainder of the season on the injured reserve list and was later released by the team.

== Coaching career ==
=== Akron ===
After a brief stint in the NFL and at Ohio State as a graduate assistant in 1999, in 2000 Fickell was hired by the University of Akron as the defensive line coach.

=== Ohio State ===
After two seasons with the Zips, he returned to Ohio State in 2002 as the special teams coordinator under second-year head coach, Jim Tressel, helping guide the team to the 2002 BCS National Championship. In 2004, Fickell took over as the linebackers coach, adding the title co-defensive coordinator to his responsibilities in 2005. In 2010, he was named assistant coach of the year by the AFCA, joining a list of Buckeyes coaches to be recognized by the association that also includes Carroll Widdoes, Woody Hayes, Earle Bruce, and Jim Tressel.

In 2011, Fickell was originally named to serve as interim head coach in place of Jim Tressel, who was given a five-game suspension by the NCAA due to a recruiting scandal. However, in May of that year, Tressel resigned and Fickell was given a one-year contract to serve as interim coach, only for the 2011 season. After Ohio State posted a 6–6 regular season record, Fickell was passed up as the permanent head coach, and instead Ohio State hired Urban Meyer. Fickell guided the Buckeyes to the 2012 Gator Bowl against the Florida Gators. After Meyer took the helm, Fickell returned to his old job as co-defensive coordinator (helping guide the Buckeyes to the 2014 CFP National Championship), a job in which he served until he was named head coach at Cincinnati. While on Meyer's staff, Fickell was part of the coaching staff that won the National Championship in the 2014 season.

=== Cincinnati ===
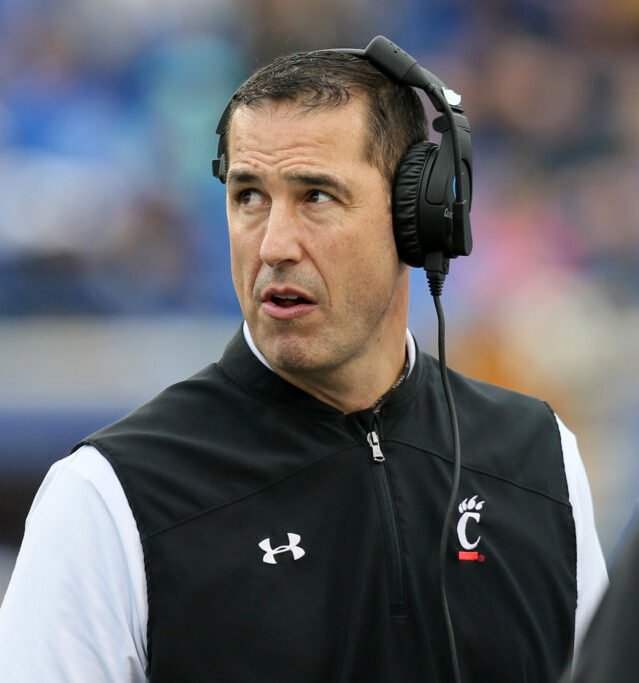
Fickell with Cincinnati in 2019

On December 10, 2016, Fickell was named as the 42nd head coach of the University of Cincinnati, taking the place of the resigning Tommy Tuberville. In his first season, Fickell led the Bearcats to a 4–8 record.

The 2018 season would be a historic turnaround of the program, finishing with an 11–2 record and a 35–31 victory in the Military Bowl over Virginia Tech. Fickell was named AAC Coach of the Year for the 2018 season, which was only the third 11-win season in the University of Cincinnati history.

He led the team to another 11-win season in 2019. The Bearcats reeled off nine straight wins after falling 42–0 to Ohio State in the second game of the year. The team won the East Division championship in the AAC for the first time, but fell two straight weeks to Memphis, in the final regular season game and in the AAC Conference Championship. For the second straight year, Cincinnati won its bowl game over an Atlantic Coast Conference team, winning the Birmingham Bowl over Boston College by a score of 38–6.

Before the start of the 2020 season Fickell agreed to a contract extension which would keep him at Cincinnati through the 2026 season. Fickell had previously received head coaching interest from other schools such as Michigan State, Florida State, West Virginia, Louisville, and Maryland. Fickell was one of thirteen coaches named to the watchlist for the Bobby Dodd Coach of the Year Award before the 2020 season.

In 2020, Luke Fickell led the Cincinnati Bearcats to a 9–1 campaign including Cincinnati's second perfect regular season which included winning the 2020 AAC Championship Game against the Tulsa Golden Hurricane. Cincinnati was selected for the 2021 Peach Bowl against the #9 Georgia Bulldogs. Both teams went into the game down a number of key players due to injury, illness, or opt-outs, including Cincinnati's two All-Americans Sauce Gardner and James Wiggins. After leading by a score of 21–10 entering the fourth quarter, Cincinnati ultimately fell to Georgia on a 53-yard field goal with 7 seconds left in the game, by a final score of 24–21. Fickell was named AAC Coach of the Year for the second time in his career.

In 2021, Fickell again led the Bearcats to a perfect regular-season record, including non-conference wins at the Notre Dame Fighting Irish and the Indiana Hoosiers. Cincinnati then defended their American Athletic Conference Football Championship with a 35–20 victory over the Houston Cougars. With a record of 13–0 as the only undefeated team in the nation, Cincinnati was selected as the #4 seed in the College Football Playoff, making them the first program outside of a "Power 5" conference to advance. Fickell was named AAC Coach of the Year for the third time in his career, and for the second consecutively, as well as being named the winner of six other major awards including Home Depot Coach of the Year, Sporting News College Football Coach of the Year, Bobby Dodd Coach of the Year, Eddie Robinson Coach of the Year, AFCA Coach of the Year, and the Paul "Bear" Bryant Award. Cincinnati would go on to lose the Cotton Bowl to Alabama.

In the 2022 season, Fickell led the team to a 9–3 record in the regular season. The Bearcats lost to Louisville 24–7 in the Fenway Bowl, although Fickell had resigned prior to the bowl game.

=== Wisconsin ===
In November 2022, Wisconsin hired Fickell as its football coach replacing Paul Chryst. Fickell was credited with coaching and winning his first game only several weeks after being hired, replacing interim Jim Leonhard in title for the 2022 Guaranteed Rate Bowl. Fickell admitted however that Leonhard was still effectively performing the head coaching duties for the game, and that his own participation was as, "maybe a little bit more of a figurehead".

In Fickell's first full season as head coach in 2023, he led the Badgers to a 7–5 record in the regular season. The Badgers ultimately lost 35–31 to the LSU Tigers in the ReliaQuest Bowl for a final record of 7–6.

Fickell in 2025

The 2024 season was less successful. Off the field, Fickell's handpicked advisor Jack Del Rio resigned mid-season after crashing his vehicle onto a neighborhood residence while intoxicated, and Fickell fired offensive coordinator Phil Longo after 10 games, with no named replacement for the remainder of the season. Fickell received criticism for answering, "Why does it matter?" when asked who would call plays in place of Longo. After a 5–2 start to the season, the Badgers lost 5 consecutive games to conclude 2024; the 5–7 record guaranteed a losing season and no Wisconsin bowl game for the first time in 22 years. In addition, Wisconsin lost all three trophy games to Big Ten rivals (Iowa, Nebraska, and Minnesota) by large margins.

Prior to the 2025 season, Fickell made a series of staffing and scheme changes, with new offensive coordinator Jeff Grimes being signed. Additionally the number 42 became a motivation tool during the off-season, in reference to the Badger's losing 42–10 against Iowa the previous season. However, 2025 ended up being Fickell's worst as a head coach since his first year with Cincinnati. Faced with what was predicted to be a difficult schedule, the Badgers finished 4–8, and saw a drop in attendance of 20%. Fickell did manage to earn his first two wins against ranked opponents while with Wisconsin, but lost every rivalry trophy game, including an even worse defeat to Iowa when they were shutout during homecoming. That offseason, Fickell opted to forgo the customary one-year contract extension offered by the University.

== Personal life ==
Luke Fickell and his wife, Amy (Goecke), who has a physical therapy degree from Ohio State, have six children—five sons and one daughter—including two sets of twin boys. They started dating when Amy was a sophomore at Ohio State; they were married in 2000. Fickell and his family are Catholic, which played a factor in Fickell's interest in coming to Cincinnati.

Fickell's eldest son, Landon, committed to Cincinnati as an offensive guard out of Moeller High School as part of the 2021 recruitment class. Landon currently serves on the coaching staff as a Graduate Assistant under his father at Wisconsin.

Fickell also is a speaker for Washington Speakers Bureau, following their partnership with the sports talent agency Athletes First. Fickell's appearance fee ranges from $40,000–70,000.

== Head coaching record ==
Year	Team	Overall	Conference	Standing	Bowl/playoffs	Coaches^{#}	AP^{°}
Ohio State Buckeyes (Big Ten Conference) (2011)
2011	Ohio State	6–7	3–5	4th (Leaders)	L Gator		
Ohio State:		6–7	3–5				
Cincinnati Bearcats (American Athletic Conference) (2017–2022)
2017	Cincinnati	4–8	2–6	T–4th (East)			
2018	Cincinnati	11–2	6–2	3rd (East)	W Military	23	24
2019	Cincinnati	11–3	7–1	1st (East)	W Birmingham	21	21
2020	Cincinnati	9–1	6–0	1st	L Peach^{†}	8	8
2021	Cincinnati	13–1	8–0	1st	L Cotton^{†}	4	4
2022	Cincinnati	9–3	6–2	3rd	Fenway*		
Cincinnati:		57–18	35–11	*resigned prior to bowl game			
Wisconsin Badgers (Big Ten Conference) (2023–present)
2022	Wisconsin	1–0	0–0	5th (West)	W Guaranteed Rate		
2023	Wisconsin	7–6	5–4	T–2nd (West)	L ReliaQuest		
2024	Wisconsin	5–7	3–6	T–12th			
2025	Wisconsin	4–8	2–7	T–14th			
2026	Wisconsin	7–4	5–3				
Wisconsin:		24–25	15–20				
Total:		87–50					
National championship Conference title Conference division title or championship game berth
^{†}Indicates CFP / New Years' Six bowl.; ^{#}Rankings from final Coaches Poll.; ^{°}Rankings from final AP Poll.
