= Jerome Ford =

American football player (born 1999)

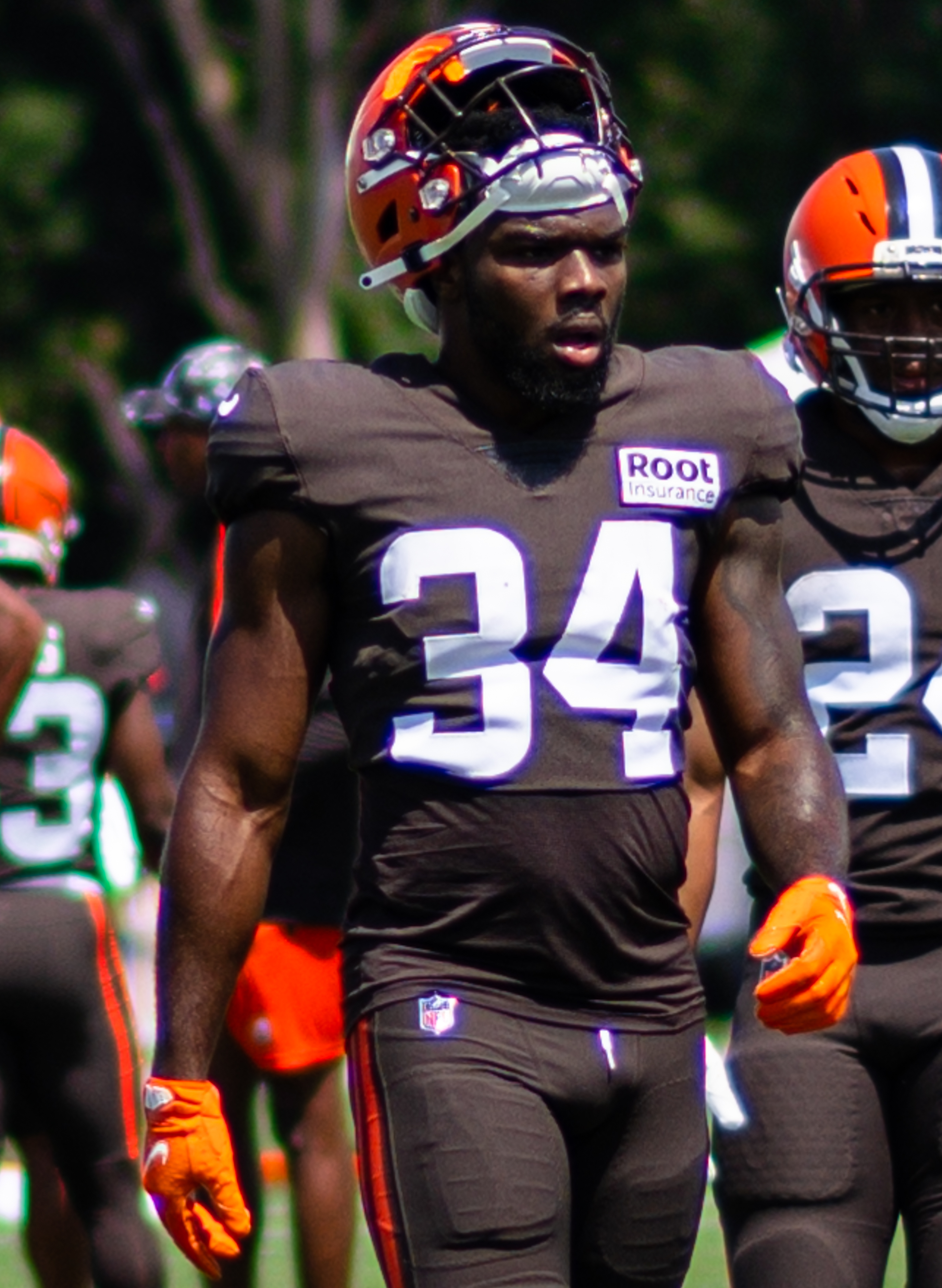
- Ford with the Cleveland Browns in 2022

No. 34 – Arizona Cardinals
- Position: Running back
- Roster status: Practice squad

Personal information
- Born: September 12, 1999 (age 27); Tampa, Florida, U.S.
- Listed height: 5 ft 10 in (1.78 m)
- Listed weight: 210 lb (95 kg)

Career information
- High school: Armwood (Seffner, Florida)
- College: Alabama (2018–2019); Cincinnati (2020–2021)
- NFL draft: 2022: 5th round, 156th overall pick

Career history
- Cleveland Browns (2022–2025); Washington Commanders (2026)*; Minnesota Vikings (2026)*; Arizona Cardinals (2026–present)
- * Offseason or practice squad member only

Awards and highlights
- First-team All-AAC (2021)

Career NFL statistics as of 2026
- Rushing yards: 1,463
- Rushing average: 4.3
- Rushing touchdowns: 7
- Receptions: 107
- Receiving yards: 647
- Receiving touchdowns: 5
- Return yards: 1,405
- Stats at Pro Football Reference

Jerome Ford (born September 12, 1999) is an American professional football running back for the Arizona Cardinals of the National Football League (NFL). Ford played college football for the Alabama Crimson Tide and Cincinnati Bearcats and was selected by the Cleveland Browns in the fifth round of the 2022 NFL draft. He has also played for the Washington Commanders.

== Early life ==
Ford attended Armwood High School in Seffner, Florida. He committed to the University of Alabama to play college football.

== College career ==
Ford played at Alabama in 2018 and 2019. Over the two years he rushed for 151 yards on 31 carries with three touchdowns. In 2020, he transferred to the University of Cincinnati.

During his first year at Cincinnati in 2020, he played in 10 games as the backup to Gerrid Doaks, rushing for 483 yards on 73 carries with eight touchdowns. In 2021, he started all 13 games, rushing for 1,319 yards (6.2 YPC) and 19 touchdowns, paired with 21 catches for 220 yards and a touchdown. He was named first-team All-AAC at running back as he helped lead the Bearcats to the College Football Playoff.

== Professional career ==
Pre-draft measurables
| Height | Weight | Arm length | Hand span | Wingspan | 40-yard dash | 10-yard split | 20-yard split | 20-yard shuttle | Three-cone drill | Vertical jump | Broad jump |
|---|---|---|---|---|---|---|---|---|---|---|---|
| 5 ft 10 1/2 in (1.79 m) | 210 lb (95 kg) | 30 5/8 in (0.78 m) | 9 1/8 in (0.23 m) | 6 ft 1 1/4 in (1.86 m) | 4.46 s | 1.55 s | 2.61 s | 4.22 s | 7.31 s | 31.0 in (0.79 m) | 9 ft 10 in (3.00 m) |
All values from NFL Combine/Pro Day

=== Cleveland Browns ===
Ford was selected by the Cleveland Browns in the fifth round, 156th overall, of the 2022 NFL draft. He suffered an ankle injury in Week 4 and was placed on injured reserve on October 4, 2022. Ford was activated from injured reserve on November 12.

In 2023, Ford took over as the starting running back after Nick Chubb suffered a season-ending injury in Week 2. Ford finished the season with 813 rushing yards and four touchdowns on 204 rushing attempts, as well as 44 catches for 319 yards and five touchdowns on 63 targets.

Ford was named the starting running back in 2024 while Chubb recovered from his 2023 injury, but was moved to a backup role following his return midseason. He played in 14 games with six starts, recording 565 rushing yards and three touchdowns, along with 37 catches for 225 yards.

In 2025, Ford operated as Cleveland's third-string running back behind Quinshon Judkins and Dylan Sampson. In 13 appearances for the team, he rushed 24 times for 73 yards and logged 26 receptions for 103 yards. After suffering a shoulder injury in Week 14 against the Tennessee Titans, Ford was placed on injured reserve on December 9, 2025.

=== Washington Commanders ===
On March 19, 2026, Ford signed a one-year, $1.4 million contract with the Washington Commanders. Ford was placed on injured reserve on August 18, and was released with an injury settlement on August 23.

=== Minnesota Vikings ===
On September 16, 2026, Ford signed to the Minnesota Vikings' practice squad. On September 29, he was released from Vikings practice squad.

=== Arizona Cardinals ===
On October 14, 2026, Ford signed with the Arizona Cardinals practice squad.

== Career statistics ==
=== NFL ===
==== Regular season ====
| Year | Team | Games | | Rushing | | | | | Receiving | | | | | Kickoff return | | | | | Fumbles | |
| Year | Team | GP | GS | Att | Yds | Avg | Lng | TD | Rec | Yds | Avg | Lng | TD | Ret | Yds | Avg | Lng | TD | Fum | Lost |
|---|---|---|---|---|---|---|---|---|---|---|---|---|---|---|---|---|---|---|---|---|
| 2022 | CLE | 13 | 0 | 8 | 12 | 1.5 | 9 | 0 | 0 | 0 | 0.0 | 0 | 0 | 30 | 723 | 24.1 | 48 | 0 | 0 | 0 |
| 2023 | CLE | 17 | 12 | 204 | 813 | 4.0 | 69 | 4 | 44 | 319 | 7.3 | 50 | 5 | — | — | — | — | — | 1 | 1 |
| 2024 | CLE | 14 | 6 | 104 | 565 | 5.4 | 66 | 3 | 37 | 225 | 6.1 | 26 | 0 | 15 | 388 | 25.9 | 56 | 0 | 0 | 0 |
| 2025 | CLE | 13 | 0 | 24 | 73 | 3.0 | 12 | 0 | 26 | 103 | 4.0 | 17 | 0 | 13 | 294 | 22.6 | 32 | 0 | 0 | 0 |
| Career | | 57 | 18 | 340 | 1463 | 4.3 | 69 | 7 | 107 | 647 | 6.0 | 50 | 5 | 58 | 1405 | 24.2 | 56 | 0 | 1 | 1 |

==== Postseason ====
| Year | Team | Games | | Rushing | | | | | Receiving | | | | | Fumbles | |
| Year | Team | GP | GS | Att | Yds | Avg | Lng | TD | Rec | Yds | Avg | Lng | TD | Fum | Lost |
|---|---|---|---|---|---|---|---|---|---|---|---|---|---|---|---|
| 2023 | CLE | 1 | 1 | 9 | 17 | 1.9 | 7 | 0 | 4 | 15 | 3.8 | 11 | 0 | 0 | 0 |
| Career | | 1 | 1 | 9 | 17 | 1.9 | 7 | 0 | 4 | 15 | 3.8 | 11 | 0 | 0 | 0 |

=== College ===
| Season | Team | GP | Rushing | | | | Receiving | | | |
| Season | Team | GP | Att | Yds | Avg | TD | Rec | Yds | Avg | TD |
|---|---|---|---|---|---|---|---|---|---|---|
| 2018 | Alabama | 4 | 7 | 37 | 5.3 | 0 | 0 | 0 | 0.0 | 0 |
| 2019 | Alabama | 4 | 24 | 114 | 4.8 | 3 | 2 | 11 | 5.5 | 0 |
| 2020 | Cincinnati | 10 | 73 | 483 | 6.6 | 8 | 8 | 51 | 6.4 | 0 |
| 2021 | Cincinnati | 13 | 215 | 1,319 | 6.1 | 19 | 21 | 220 | 10.5 | 1 |
| Career | | 31 | 319 | 1,953 | 6.1 | 30 | 31 | 282 | 9.1 | 1 |
