= 2020 American Athletic Conference Football Championship Game =

Annual NCAA football Championship game

- 6th AAC Championship Game
Tulsa Golden Hurricane	Cincinnati Bearcats
(6–1)	(8–0)
24	27
Head coach: Philip Montgomery	Head coach: Luke Fickell
AP / Coaches / CFP; 20 / 20 / 23	AP / Coaches / CFP; 6 / 6 / 9
	1	2	3	4	Total
Tulsa	0	10	7	7	24
Cincinnati	10	7	7	3	27
- Date: December 19, 2020
- Season: 2020
- Stadium: Nippert Stadium
- Location: Cincinnati, OH
- MVP: Desmond Ridder (QB, Cincinnati)
- Favorite: Cincinnati by 13.5
- Referee: Charles Lamertina
- Attendance: 5,831

United States TV coverage
- Network: ABC
- Announcers: Joe Tessitore (play-by-play), Greg McElroy (color), Holly Rowe (sideline)

2020 American Athletic Conference football standings
	Conf.			Overall
Team	W		L	W		L
No. 8 Cincinnati y$	6	–	0	9	–	1
Tulsa y	6	–	0	6	–	3
Memphis	5	–	3	8	–	3
UCF	5	–	3	6	–	4
SMU	4	–	3	7	–	3
Houston	3	–	3	3	–	5
Navy	3	–	4	3	–	7
Tulane	3	–	5	6	–	6
East Carolina	3	–	5	3	–	6
Temple	1	–	6	1	–	6
South Florida	0	–	7	1	–	8
Championship: Cincinnati 27, Tulsa 24
$ – Conference champion; y – Championship game participant; Rankings from AP Poll.

The 2020 American Athletic Conference Football Championship Game presented by CapitalOne was a college football game played on Saturday, December 19, 2020, at Nippert Stadium in Cincinnati, Ohio. The 6th American Athletic Conference Championship Game, it determined the 2020 champion of the American Athletic Conference (The American). This was the first year of the current division-less format of the game; instead of representatives from two divisions, the two teams with the best conference records earned a spot in the game.

In consideration of the COVID-19 pandemic in Ohio, attendance at the game was capped at 5,831 spectators by the Cincinnati Health Department, approximately 18% of the full capacity of Nippert Stadium (32,574).

== Previous season ==
The 2019 American Athletic Conference Football Championship Game featured East Division winner Cincinnati against West Division co-winner Memphis. Eight days after beating the Bearcats 34–24 at home in the regular-season finale, Memphis rallied for another win. The Tigers beat the Bearcats, 29–24.

== Teams ==
=== Cincinnati ===
The Cincinnati Bearcats clinched a berth in the Championship Game, after the November 28 game against Temple was canceled. This is Cincinnati's second consecutive Championship Game appearance.

=== Tulsa ===
The Tulsa Golden Hurricane clinched a berth in the Championship Game after defeating Navy on December 5. This is Tulsa's first appearance in the conference championship.

== Game summary ==
2020 American Athletic Conference Football Championship Game

Quarter	1	2	3	4	Total
No. 23 Tulsa	0	10	7	7	24
No. 9 Cincinnati	10	7	7	3	27

at Nippert Stadium, Cincinnati, Ohio

- Date: December 19, 2020
- Game time: 8:00 p.m. EST (7:00 p.m. CST)
- Game weather: Rain • Temperature: 41 °F (5 °C) • Wind: SSW 6 mph
- Game attendance: 5,831
- Referee: Charles Lamertina
- TV announcers (ABC): Joe Tessitore (play-by-play), Greg McElroy (color), Holly Rowe (sideline)

Game information

First quarter

- (8:56) CIN – Jerome Ford 42 yard rush, Cole Smith kick (Drive: 4 plays, 75 yards, 1:54; Cincinnati 7–0)
- (0:05) CIN – Cole Smith 25 yard field goal (Drive: 11 plays, 72 yards, 5:46; Cincinnati 10–0)

Second quarter

- (11:08) TLSA – Zack Long 43 yard field goal (Drive: 11 plays, 46 yards, 3:52; Cincinnati 10–3)
- (8:36) TLSA – Corey Taylor II 10 yard rush, Zack Long kick (Drive: 5 plays, 28 yards, 1:37; Tied 10–10)
- (3:17) CIN – Alec Pierce 36 yard pass from Desmond Ridder, Cole Smith kick (Drive: 5 plays, 64 yards, 2:04; Cincinnati 17–10)

Third quarter

- (10:05) TLSA – Deneric Prince 8 yard rush, Zack Long kick (Drive: 3 plays, 55 yards, 0:45; Tied 17–17)
- (7:14) CIN – Desmond Ridder 10 yard rush, Cole Smith kick (Drive: 6 plays, 65 yards, 2:46; Cincinnati 24–17)

Fourth quarter

- (3:41) TLSA – JuanCarlos Santana 13 yard pass from Zach Smith, Zack Long kick (Drive: 7 plays, 80 yards, 2:46; Tied 24–24)
- (0:00) CIN – Cole Smith 34 yard field goal (Drive: 12 plays, 51 yards, 3:34; Cincinnati 27–24)

=== Statistics ===
Statistics	TLSA	CIN
First downs	22	17
Plays–yards	67–332	67–420
Rushes–yards	37–166	38–151
Passing yards	166	269
Passing: comp–att–int	13–30–2	19–29–0
Time of possession	26:03	33:57

Team	Category	Player	Statistics
Tulsa	Passing	Zach Smith	13/30, 166 yards, 1 TD, 2 INT
Tulsa	Rushing	Corey Taylor II	22 carries, 102 yards, 1 TD
Tulsa	Receiving	Sam Crawford Jr.	3 receptions, 79 yards
Cincinnati	Passing	Desmond Ridder	19/29, 269 yards, 1 TD
Cincinnati	Rushing	Desmond Ridder	16 carries, 83 yards, 1 TD
Cincinnati	Receiving	Alec Pierce	5 receptions, 146 yards, 1 TD
