= Michael Young Jr. =

American football player (born 1999)

Profile
- Position: Wide receiver

Personal information
- Born: February 11, 1999 (age 27); St. Rose, Louisiana, U.S.
- Listed height: 5 ft 10 in (1.78 m)
- Listed weight: 195 lb (88 kg)

Career information
- High school: Destrehan High School
- College: Notre Dame (2017–2019); Cincinnati (2020–2021)
- NFL draft: 2022: undrafted

Career history
- Indianapolis Colts (2022)*; Houston Texans (2022)*
- * Offseason or practice squad member only
- Stats at Pro Football Reference

Michael Joseph Young Jr. (born February 11, 1999) is an American former football wide receiver who is a free agent. He played college football at Notre Dame and Cincinnati.

== Early life ==
Michael Young Jr was a 3-star recruit from St. Rose, Louisiana. He played high school football at Destrehan High School.

== College career ==
Young committed to Notre Dame on July 20, 2016 and played three seasons for the Fighting Irish from 2017 to 2020. On April 12, 2020, Young announced his transfer to the University of Cincinnati and played two seasons for the Bearcats from 2020 to 2021. During his college career, Young had 862 yards receiving and 7 touchdowns at both schools. After the 2021 college football season, Young announced he was going to enter the 2022 NFL draft.

=== Statistics ===
Season	Team	GP	Receiving				
Season	Team	GP	Rec	Yds	Avg	Lng	TD
2017	Notre Dame	3	4	18	4.5	6	1
2018	Notre Dame	6	7	138	19.7	66	1
2019	Notre Dame	3	6	21	3.5	8	0
2020	Cincinnati	10	29	332	11.4	33	3
2021	Cincinnati	11	28	353	12.6	38	2
Career		33	74	862	11.6	66	7

== Professional career ==
Pre-draft measurables
Height	Weight	Arm length	Hand span	40-yard dash	10-yard split	20-yard split	20-yard shuttle	Vertical jump	Broad jump	Bench press
5 ft 10 1/4 in (1.78 m)	190 lb (86 kg)	31 1/4 in (0.79 m)	8 3/4 in (0.22 m)	4.54 s	1.56 s	2.66 s	4.39 s	36.0 in (0.91 m)	10 ft 0 in (3.05 m)	16 reps
All values from Pro Day

Young went undrafted in the 2022 NFL draft.

=== Indianapolis Colts ===
Young was signed by the Indianapolis Colts as an undrafted free agent following the NFL draft. He was waived by the Colts on August 16, 2022.

=== Houston Texans ===
On October 27, 2022, Young was signed to the Houston Texans practice squad. He was released from the practice squad on November 15, 2022.
