= James Wiggins (American football) =

American football player (born 1997)

Profile
- Position: Safety

Personal information
- Born: April 26, 1997 (age 29); Miami, Florida, U.S.
- Listed height: 5 ft 11 in (1.80 m)
- Listed weight: 209 lb (95 kg)

Career information
- High school: South Dade (Homestead, Florida)
- College: Cincinnati (2016–2020)
- NFL draft: 2021: 7th round, 243rd overall pick

Career history
- Arizona Cardinals (2021); Kansas City Chiefs (2022)*; Green Bay Packers (2023)*; New Orleans Breakers (2023); Birmingham Stallions (2024)*; Edmonton Elks (2024)
- * Offseason or practice squad member only

Awards and highlights
- Second-team All-American (2020); Second-team All-AAC (2018)
- Stats at Pro Football Reference

James Wiggins (born April 26, 1997) is an American professional football safety. He played college football at Cincinnati, and was selected by the Arizona Cardinals in the seventh round of the 2021 NFL draft.

== Early life ==
Wiggins attended South Dade Senior High School in Homestead, Florida. He originally committed to the University of Miami to play college football but switched his commitment to the University of Cincinnati.

== College career ==
Wiggins played at Cincinnati from 2016 to 2020. Over the course of his college career, Wiggins was named to Bruce Feldman's college football freaks list multiple times for his outstanding athleticism.

He redshirted his first year in 2016. He became a starter his sophomore year in 2018, a season in which Wiggins would have two game winning interceptions for the Bearcats. In a September win over Ohio that year, Wiggins' interception at the 1-yard line with 52 seconds left clinched a 34–30 victory. The following month at SMU, his 86-yard "Pick Six" in overtime ended UC's 26–20 win over the Mustangs.

Wiggins missed the 2019 season due to a torn ACL. Wiggins returned from the injury in 2020 and was named an All-American by The Athletic.

== Professional career ==
Pre-draft measurables
Height	Weight	Arm length	Hand span	40-yard dash	10-yard split	20-yard split	Vertical jump	Broad jump	Bench press
5 ft 11 1/4 in (1.81 m)	209 lb (95 kg)	29 in (0.74 m)	9 3/4 in (0.25 m)	4.41 s	1.53 s	2.62 s	38.0 in (0.97 m)	10 ft 7 in (3.23 m)	22 reps
All values from Pro Day

=== Arizona Cardinals ===
Wiggins was selected by the Arizona Cardinals in the seventh round (243rd overall) of the 2021 NFL draft. On May 20, 2021, Wiggins signed his four-year rookie contract with Arizona. He was waived on August 31, 2021 and re-signed to the practice squad the next day. He was promoted to the active roster on October 12, 2021. He was placed on injured reserve on December 4.

On August 30, 2022, Wiggins was waived by the Cardinals.

=== Kansas City Chiefs ===
On September 6, 2022, Wiggins signed with the practice squad of the Kansas City Chiefs. He was released from the practice squad on September 13, 2022.

=== Green Bay Packers ===
On January 10, 2023, Wiggins signed a reserve/future contract with the Green Bay Packers. Wiggins was released by Green Bay on May 15, 2023.

=== New Orleans Breakers ===
Wiggins signed with the New Orleans Breakers of the United States Football League (USFL) on May 30, 2023. The Breakers folded when the XFL and USFL merged to create the United Football League (UFL).

=== Birmingham Stallions ===
On January 5, 2023, Wiggins was drafted by the Birmingham Stallions during the 2024 UFL dispersal draft. He was released on March 10, 2024.

=== Edmonton Elks ===
Wiggins signed with the Edmonton Elks of the Canadian Football League on March 11, 2024. He was placed on the reserve/suspended list on May 12, 2024.
