= John Williams (offensive lineman, born 2002) =

American football player (born 2002)

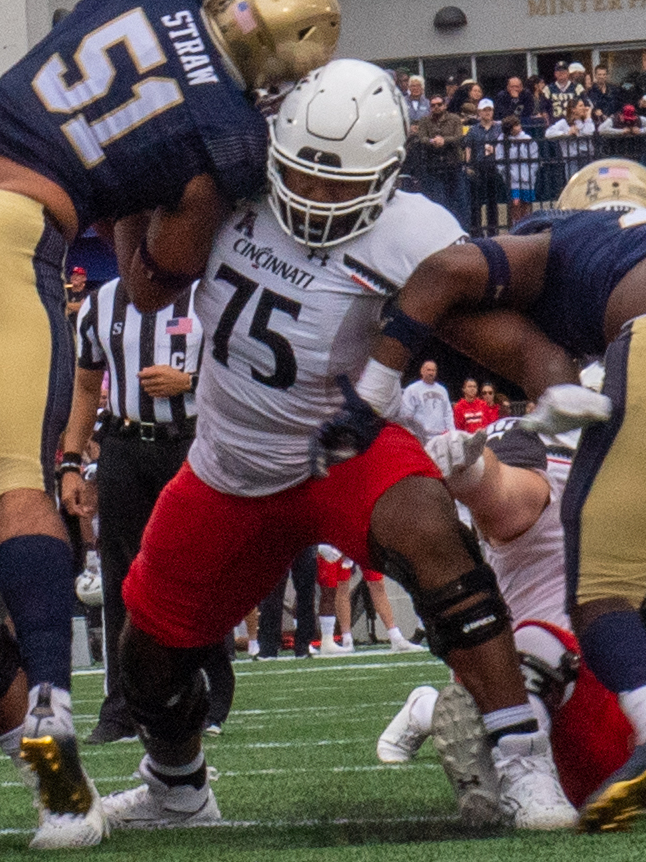
- Williams with Cincinnati in 2021

No. 73 – Green Bay Packers
- Position: Center
- Roster status: Active

Personal information
- Born: January 17, 2002 (age 24); Bolingbrook, Illinois, U.S.
- Listed height: 6 ft 4 in (1.93 m)
- Listed weight: 322 lb (146 kg)

Career information
- High school: Bolingbrook (IL)
- College: Cincinnati (2020–2024)
- NFL draft: 2025: 7th round, 250th overall pick

Career history
- Green Bay Packers (2025–present)

Career NFL statistics as of Week 10, 2026
- Games played: 9
- Games started: 3
- Stats at Pro Football Reference

John Jeremy Williams (born January 17, 2002) is an American professional football center for the Green Bay Packers of the National Football League (NFL). He played college football for the Cincinnati Bearcats and was selected by the Packers in the seventh round of the 2025 NFL draft.

== Early life ==
Williams attended Bolingbrook High School in Bolingbrook, Illinois. He was rated as a three-star recruit and committed to play college football for the Cincinnati Bearcats.

== College career ==
As a freshman in 2020, Williams appeared in just four games for the Bearcats. In the 2021 and 2022 seasons, he played primarily as a right tackle, appearing in 24 games with three starts. Heading into the 2023 season, Williams took over as the Bearcats starting left tackle. After the 2024 season, he declared for the 2025 NFL draft and accepted an invite to the 2025 NFL Scouting Combine. Williams also accepted an invite to participate in the 2025 East–West Shrine Bowl.

== Professional career ==
Pre-draft measurables
Height	Weight	Arm length	Hand span	Wingspan	40-yard dash	10-yard split	20-yard split	20-yard shuttle	Three-cone drill	Bench press
6 ft 4 1/8 in (1.93 m)	322 lb (146 kg)	33 7/8 in (0.86 m)	11 in (0.28 m)	6 ft 9 1/2 in (2.07 m)	5.17 s	1.80 s	3.00 s	4.72 s	7.93 s	29 reps
All values from NFL Combine

Williams was drafted by the Green Bay Packers with the 250th overall pick in the seventh round of the 2025 NFL draft. On May 2, 2025, he signed his rookie contract with the Packers. In August 2025, he was placed on reserve/physically unable to perform where he spent the entirety of the season.

WIlliams made the 53 man roster in 2026, appearing in 6 of the first 7 weeks of the season, including stepping in at center during week 7.

== Personal life ==
At Cincinnati, Williams majored in aerospace engineering, hoping to work at Lockheed Martin or SpaceX in the future.
