= Gerrid Doaks =

American football player (born 1998)

Profile
- Position: Running back

Personal information
- Born: June 9, 1998 (age 28); Indianapolis, Indiana, U.S.
- Listed height: 5 ft 11 in (1.80 m)
- Listed weight: 228 lb (103 kg)

Career information
- High school: Lawrence Central (Indianapolis, Indiana)
- College: Cincinnati (2017–2020)
- NFL draft: 2021: 7th round, 244th overall pick

Career history
- Miami Dolphins (2021–2022)*; Houston Texans (2022–2024)*
- * Offseason or practice squad member only

Awards and highlights
- First-team All-AAC (2020)
- Stats at Pro Football Reference

Gerrid Doaks (born June 9, 1998) is an American professional football running back. He played college football for the Cincinnati Bearcats.

== College career ==
Doaks played at the University of Cincinnati from 2017 to 2020. He was the starter for the Bearcats for his senior year in 2020. He would rush for 673 yards and had 14 total receptions for 202 yards over the 9 game, COVID-19 shortened season. His senior performance earned him first-team all-American Athletic Conference honors.

=== Statistics ===
Season	Team	Games	Rushing				Receiving			
Season	Team	Games	Att	Yards	Avg	TD	Rec	Yards	Avg	TD
2017	Cincinnati	9	87	513	5.9	2	14	135	9.6	1
2018	Cincinnati	Injured								
2019	Cincinnati	12	100	526	5.3	5	8	70	8.8	1
2020	Cincinnati	9	144	673	4.7	7	14	202	14.4	2
Career		30	331	1712	5.2	14	36	407	11.3	4

== Professional career ==
Pre-draft measurables
Height	Weight	Arm length	Hand span	40-yard dash	10-yard split	20-yard split	20-yard shuttle	Three-cone drill	Vertical jump	Broad jump	Bench press
5 ft 11 3/8 in (1.81 m)	228 lb (103 kg)	31 in (0.79 m)	9 3/4 in (0.25 m)	4.58 s	1.57 s	2.68 s	4.28 s	7.21 s	39.5 in (1.00 m)	10 ft 0 in (3.05 m)	19 reps
All values from Pro Day

=== Miami Dolphins ===
Doaks was drafted by the Miami Dolphins in the seventh round, 244th overall, of the 2021 NFL draft. He signed his four-year rookie contract on May 13, 2021. Doaks was cut by the Dolphins on August 31 during final roster cuts and re-signed with the practice squad the next day. He signed a reserve/future contract with the Dolphins on January 14, 2022.

On August 29, 2022, Doaks was waived by the Dolphins.

=== Houston Texans ===
On September 7, 2022, Doaks was signed to the Houston Texans practice squad. He was released on November 16. He was re-signed on December 13. He signed a reserve/future contract on January 10, 2023.

On August 29, 2023, Doaks was waived by the Texans, and later re-signed to the practice squad. He was released on November 29. He signed a reserve/future contract on January 22, 2024. He was waived on May 10, 2024.
