= Alec Pierce =

American football player (born 2000)

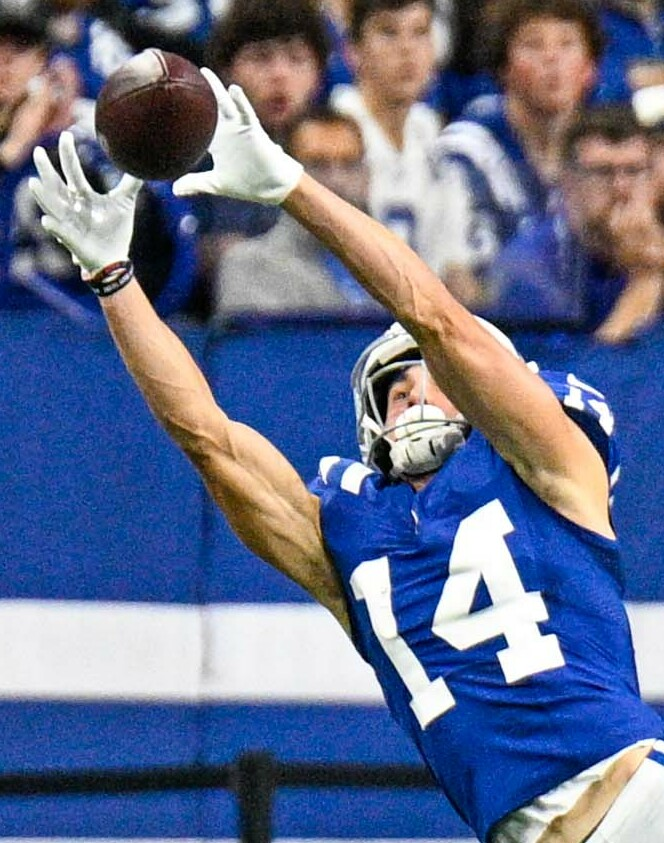
- Pierce with the Indianapolis Colts in 2022

No. 14 – Indianapolis Colts
- Position: Wide receiver
- Roster status: Injured reserve

Personal information
- Born: May 2, 2000 (age 26); Glen Ellyn, Illinois, U.S.
- Listed height: 6 ft 3 in (1.91 m)
- Listed weight: 211 lb (96 kg)

Career information
- High school: Glenbard West (Glen Ellyn)
- College: Cincinnati (2018–2021)
- NFL draft: 2022: 2nd round, 53rd overall pick

Career history
- Indianapolis Colts (2022–present)

Awards and highlights
- Second-team All-AAC (2021)

Career NFL statistics as of Week 2, 2026
- Receptions: 162
- Receiving yards: 3,006
- Receiving touchdowns: 17
- Stats at Pro Football Reference

Alec Matthew Pierce (born May 2, 2000) is an American professional football wide receiver for the Indianapolis Colts of the National Football League (NFL). He played college football for the Cincinnati Bearcats before the Colts selected him in the second round of the 2022 NFL draft.

== Early life ==
Pierce grew up in Glen Ellyn, Illinois and attended Glenbard West High School, where he played football, volleyball, basketball and ran track. His father, Greg Pierce, was a former tight end who played collegiately at Northwestern University.

As a senior, Alec caught 25 passes for 372 yards and five touchdowns with three sacks and four interceptions on defense and was named the Most Valuable Player of the West Suburban Conference Silver Division. Pierce was rated a three-star recruit and committed to play college football at Cincinnati over scholarship offers from 17 other programs.

== College career ==
Pierce played mostly on special teams as a true freshman. He practiced at linebacker ahead of the team's appearance in the Military Bowl but ultimately did not play at that position. As a sophomore Pierce caught 37 passes for a team-high 652 yards and two touchdowns. He missed four games of his junior season due to a knee injury and finished the year with 17 receptions for 315 yards and three touchdowns. As a senior, Pierce caught 52 passes for 884 yards and eight touchdowns and was named second-team All-American Athletic Conference.

=== Statistics ===
Season	Team	GP	Receiving				
Season	Team	GP	Rec	Yds	Avg	Lng	TD
2018	Cincinnati	4	0	0	0.0	0	0
2019	Cincinnati	12	37	652	17.6	52	2
2020	Cincinnati	6	17	315	18.5	45	3
2021	Cincinnati	14	52	884	17.0	53	8
Career		36	106	1,851	17.5	53	13

== Professional career ==
Pre-draft measurables
Height	Weight	Arm length	Hand span	Wingspan	40-yard dash	10-yard split	20-yard split	20-yard shuttle	Three-cone drill	Vertical jump	Broad jump
6 ft 3 1/8 in (1.91 m)	211 lb (96 kg)	33 in (0.84 m)	9 in (0.23 m)	6 ft 6 1/2 in (1.99 m)	4.41 s	1.58 s	2.48 s	4.20 s	7.13 s	40.5 in (1.03 m)	10 ft 9 in (3.28 m)
All values from NFL Combine/Pro Day

Pierce was selected by the Indianapolis Colts in the second round with the 53rd overall pick in the 2022 NFL draft. On October 16, Pierce caught his first career touchdown in the Week 6 matchup against the Jacksonville Jaguars. The Colts won the game 34–27. Pierce posted his best NFL game on NBC Sunday Night Football, notching team-highs in catches (four) and receiving yards (86) while adding his second-career touchdown. He finished his rookie season with 41 receptions for 593 receiving yards and two receiving touchdowns.

In Week 14 of the 2023 season against the Tennessee Titans, Pierce enjoyed his first career 100–yard game. He opened the game with a 36-yard touchdown on Indianapolis' first possession, and finished with 100 yards and a touchdown on six receptions. Pierce finished the season as the Colts' third-leading receiver with 32 catches for 514 yards and two touchdowns.

In Week 1 of the 2024 season, Pierce had three receptions for 125 yards and a touchdown in a 29–27 loss to the Houston Texans. In a Week 5 loss to the Jacksonville Jaguars, he had three receptions for 134 yards and a touchdown. In Week 17 against the New York Giants, Pierce recorded six receptions for 122 yards. In the 2024 season, he had 37 receptions for 824 yards and seven touchdowns.

Pierce made 15 appearances (14 starts) for Indianapolis during the 2025 season, logging 47 receptions for 1,003 yards and six touchdowns. His 47 receptions were the fewest to clear 1,000 yards since DeSean Jackson did so in 2010.

On March 12, 2026, Pierce re-signed with the Colts on a four-year, $114 million contract. After aggravating a heel injury in Week 2 against the Kansas City Chiefs, Pierce was placed on injured reserve on September 26.

== NFL career statistics ==
Legend
	Led the league
**Bold**	Career high

Year	Team	Games		Receiving						Fumbles	
Year	Team	GP	GS	Tgt	Rec	Yds	Avg	Lng	TD	Fum	Lost
2022	IND	16	12	78	41	593	14.5	47	2	**1**	0
2023	IND	**17**	**16**	65	32	514	16.1	58	2	0	0
2024	IND	16	13	67	37	824	**22.3**	65	**7**	0	0
2025	IND	15	14	**84**	**47**	**1,003**	21.3	**66**	6	0	0
Career		64	55	296	157	2,934	18.6	66	17	1	0

== Personal life ==
Both of Pierce's parents were athletes at Northwestern University, with his father playing football and his mother playing volleyball. His younger brother, Caden Pierce, plays college basketball, set to play for Purdue in 2026. Another brother, Justin, played college basketball at William & Mary and North Carolina and currently plays professionally in Europe.

== Additional reading ==
- Andrew Moore, "Alec Pierce: Indianapolis Colts Rookie Files," Horseshoe Huddle, August 30, 2022.
