= Tre Odoms-Dukes =

American CFL player (born 1997)

No. 88
- Position: Wide receiver

Personal information
- Born: June 18, 1997 (age 29); Pensacola, Florida, U.S.
- Listed height: 6 ft 3 in (1.91 m)
- Listed weight: 216 lb (98 kg)

Career information
- High school: Paul R. Wharton (Tampa, FL)
- College: South Florida

Career history
- 2021: Denver Broncos*
- 2022–2024: Calgary Stampeders
- 2025: Edmonton Elks*
- * Offseason or practice squad member only
- Stats at CFL.ca

DeVontres Odoms-Dukes (born June 18, 1997) is an American professional football wide receiver. He played college football at South Florida. He has been a member of the Denver Broncos of the National Football League (NFL), and the Calgary Stampeders and Edmonton Elks of the Canadian Football League (CFL).

== Early life ==
Odoms-Dukes played high school football at Paul R. Wharton High School in Tampa, Florida. He recorded 486 receiving yards and 5 touchdowns his junior year. He then caught 41 passes for 780 yards and 14 touchdown his senior year, earning honorable mention Hillsborough All-County honors and participating in the Hillsborough County East-West Senior All-Star game.

== College career ==
Odoms-Dukes was a member of the South Florida from 2016 to 2020, redshirting in 2016. He caught 3 passes for 32 yards in 2017, 1 pass for 12 yards in 2018, and 4 passes for 59 yards and 1 touchdown in 2019. He recorded 24 receptions for 297 yards and 4 touchdowns his senior season. Odoms-Dukes finished his college career with 32 catches for 400 yards and 5 touchdowns.

== Professional career ==
After going undrafted in the 2021 NFL draft, Odoms-Dukes signed with the Denver Broncos on May 14, 2021. He was waived/injured on August 17 and reverted to injured reserve the next day. He was waived on August 26, 2021.

Odoms-Dukes signed with the Calgary Stampeders on February 14, 2022. He bounced back and forth between the practice squad and active roster during his rookie CFL season, playing in 4 games, all starts, while totalling 11 receptions for 112 yards and 1 touchdown. The 2023 CFL season proved to be a breakout year for Odoms-Dukes as he played in 14 games for the Stampeders and tallied 60 catches for 686 yards and 2 touchdowns.

Odoms-Dukes signed with the Edmonton Elks on January 7, 2025. He was waived during training camp on May 14, 2025.

== Personal life ==
Odoms-Dukes is a relative of basketball player Reggie Evans.
