= Todd Graham =

American football player and coach (born 1964)

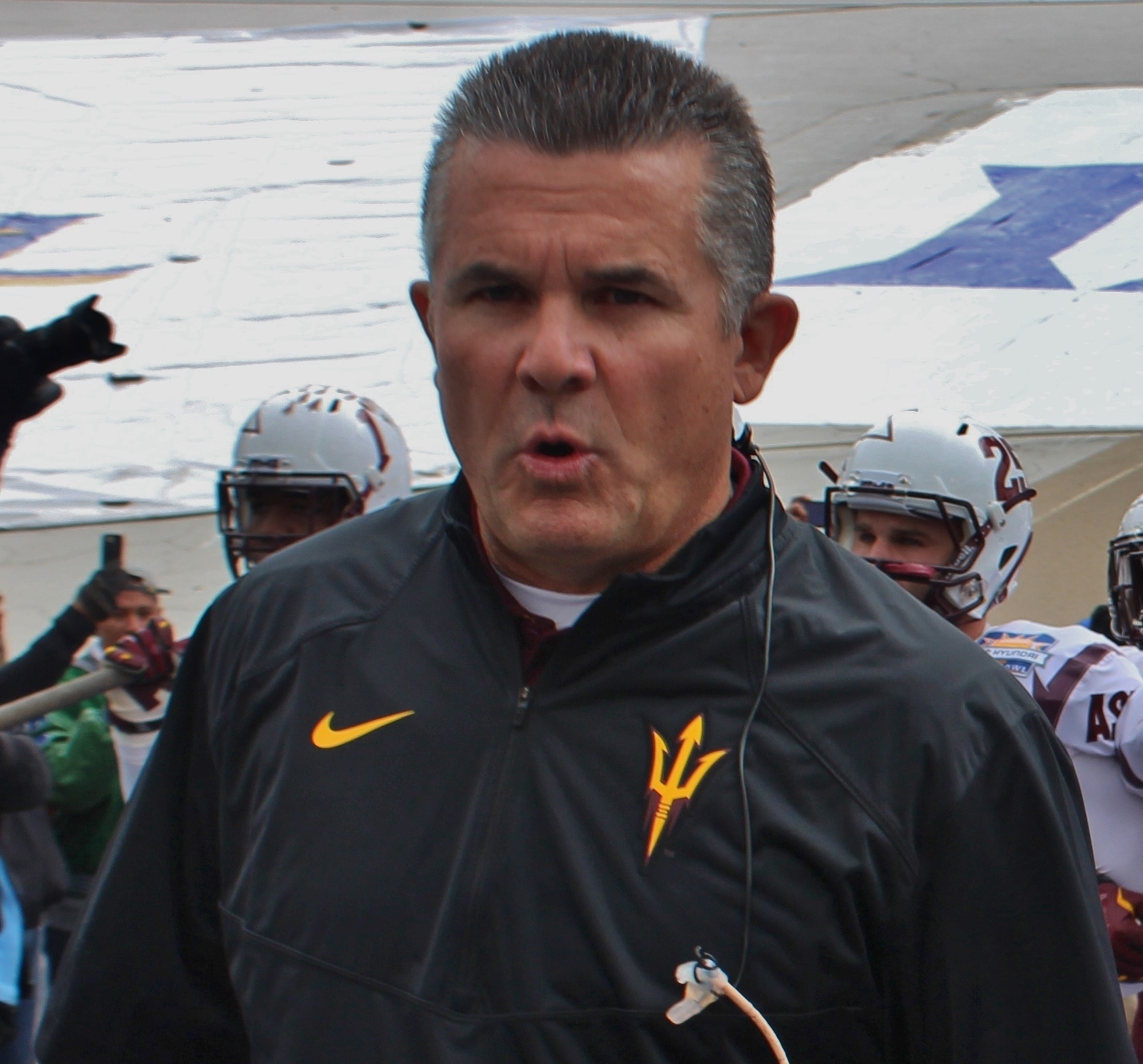
- Graham at the 2014 Sun Bowl

Current position
- Title: Offensive analyst
- Team: TCU
- Conference: Big 12

Biographical details
- Born: December 5, 1964 (age 61); Mesquite, Texas, U.S.

Playing career
- 1983–1986: East Central
- Position: Defensive back

Coaching career (HC unless noted)
- 1988–1990: Poteet HS (TX) (assistant)
- 1991–1993: East Central (DC)
- 1994: Carl Albert HS (OK)
- 1995–2000: Allen HS (TX)
- 2001: West Virginia (LB/RC)
- 2002: West Virginia (co-DC/S/RC)
- 2003–2005: Tulsa (AHC/DC/DB)
- 2006: Rice
- 2007–2010: Tulsa
- 2011: Pittsburgh
- 2012–2017: Arizona State
- 2020–2021: Hawaii
- 2024–present: TCU (OA)

Head coaching record
- Overall: 106–72 (college)
- Bowls: 6–4

Accomplishments and honors

Championships
- Pac-12 South Division (2013); 3 C-USA West Division (2007–2008, 2010)

Awards
- Pac-12 Coach of the Year (2013); C-USA Coach of the Year (2006)

Michael Todd Graham (born December 5, 1964) is an American college football coach and former player who serves as an offensive analyst for Texas Christian University (TCU). He was previously the head football coach at the University of Hawaiʻi at Mānoa.

== Playing career ==
Graham was an all-district defensive back at North Mesquite High School, from which he graduated in 1983. He then went on to play at East Central University in Ada, Oklahoma, where he was a two-time All-NAIA defensive back. After graduation from East Central, Graham briefly signed with the Arizona Cardinals of the NFL in 1987.

== Coaching career ==
Graham began his coaching career in 1988 as an assistant at Poteet High School in his hometown of Mesquite. He later held head coaching positions at Carl Albert High School in Midwest City, Oklahoma, and Allen High School in Allen, Texas before becoming linebackers coach under Rich Rodriguez at West Virginia University in 2001. The following season Graham was assigned to defensive co-coordinator.

In 2003, he was hired by Steve Kragthorpe as the defensive coordinator at Tulsa, where he helped guide the Golden Hurricane to two bowl games in three seasons. Graham built one of the best defensive units in Conference USA and the nation before leaving the position following his third year at Tulsa for his first head coaching stint.

=== Rice ===
Graham was hired as the head coach at Rice on January 1, 2006. This followed the resignation of long-time coach Ken Hatfield after the Owls had finished 1–10 in 2005. At Rice, athletic director Chris Del Conte helped Graham raise $5.5 million for renovating Rice Stadium and replacing the dated AstroTurf with FieldTurf. He hired former University of Texas quarterback Major Applewhite as his offensive coordinator, replacing the triple option offense Hatfield had been running with a more balanced attack. Behind quarterback Chase Clement and All-American receiver Jarett Dillard, Rice pulled off the biggest turnaround of the 2006 season, finishing 7–5 and earning an invitation to the New Orleans Bowl, the school's first bowl game since 1961. Graham was named Conference USA Coach of the Year, and was rewarded by the Rice administration with the offer of a significant pay raise and contract extension. After signing this extension, Graham left for Tulsa only a few days later. Graham received much criticism for this move. On November 24, 2007, when Tulsa played Rice at Rice Stadium, the Rice University Marching Owl Band presented a halftime show named "Todd Graham's Inferno" (based on Dante's "The Divine Comedy"), which concluded with the band announcer calling Graham "a douchebag". This resulted in a formal protest to Conference USA by Tulsa's athletic department. Chuck Throckmorton, the marching band's director, later apologized for offending anyone, but not for the show. Tulsa won the game 48–43. Following Graham's exodus, Rice hired David Bailiff, who led Rice to its 2008 Texas Bowl, and its 2012 Armed Forces Bowl and the 2013 Conference USA title.

=== Tulsa ===
When the Tulsa head coaching position was vacant following the 2002 season, Graham sent in his application. It was not until five years later that Graham took over the reins as the Golden Hurricane head coach. After serving three years as Tulsa defensive coordinator and one year as Rice head coach, Graham was introduced as Tulsa's 27th head football coach on January 12, 2007.

For his offensive coordinators, Graham turned to his friend, Gus Malzahn, then offensive coordinator at the University of Arkansas, and Herb Hand, tight ends coach at West Virginia University. He also hired former Golden Hurricane quarterback and coach at Tulsa's Union High School, Bill Blankenship as wide receivers coach.

With an annual salary of $1.1 million Graham was the second-highest-paid coach in Conference USA, behind SMU's June Jones in 2010.

In his final season at Tulsa, the team reached a 10–3 record that included a 28–27 upset at Notre Dame and 62–35 win over No. 24 Hawaii in the 2010 Hawaii Bowl.

=== Pittsburgh ===
Graham was announced as Pitt's head coach on January 10, 2011. He was hired after Michael Haywood, the initial choice to replace sixth-year coach Dave Wannstedt, was fired after a domestic dispute.

Graham subsequently led the team to a disappointing 6–6 regular season later that fall. Less than one year from his hiring, on December 13, Graham informed athletic director Steve Pederson that he had discussed a head coaching opportunity at Arizona State. After being informed he did not have permission to talk to the school about the job and refusing conversations with Pederson and another administrator, Graham resigned and subsequently accepted the head coaching job at Arizona State. Reportedly, Graham's wife had never been happy in Pittsburgh in the first place and wanted to move closer to her family. Graham informed the Pitt players of his departure the following day by having a text message forwarded to the team by director of football operations Blair Philbrick. Two weeks prior to leaving Pitt, Graham referred to assistant coaches who left to join the staff of Rich Rodriguez at Arizona as "nothing but mercenaries." In later interviews, Graham claimed those comments were taken out of context. He said he wasn't referring to the coaches who left Pittsburgh and that he was having a conversation with reporters generally about college football coaching and said, "A lot of times coaches jump around everywhere, they're like mercenaries."

The style in which Graham left, in combination with his quick departures from other universities, led to criticism of Graham in both local and national media. University of Pittsburgh players also openly criticized Graham for his quick departure. Defensive tackle Chas Alecxih said most players were "shocked and appalled." Wide receiver Devin Street's comments were a little more severe stating, "It's been all a lie this whole time. Everything he told us has been a lie." Another one of Graham's players at the time, senior offensive tackle Lucas Nix, stated that he felt Graham's exiting text message wasn't worthy of the trust the team had put into Graham and his program. "We put our trust in him, and all he could do was send us a text message," Nix said.

=== Arizona State ===
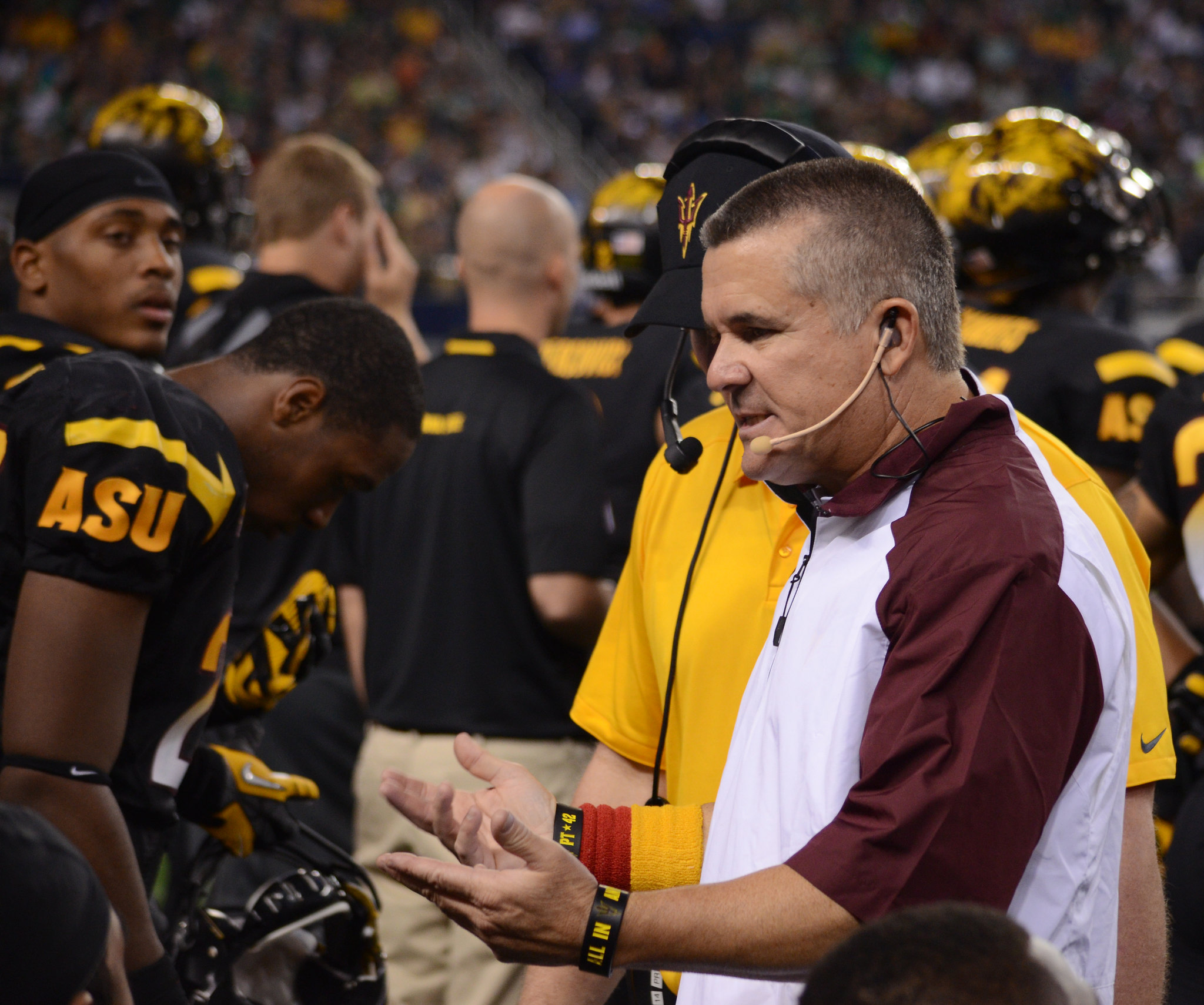
Graham at AT&T Stadium

Graham was announced as Arizona State University's head coach on December 14, 2011. In his first season at Arizona State, the Sun Devils went 8–5, securing their first winning season since 2007. With a win in the Kraft Fight Hunger Bowl against the Navy Midshipmen, the 2012 Sun Devils won the final three games of the season for the first time since 1978. ESPN's Pac-12 Blog writer Ted Miller called Graham's first season at Arizona State an "unquestioned success." In 2013, Graham continued to build positive momentum and led ASU to win the Pac-12 South after defeating UCLA and rival University of Arizona. ASU finished the season 10–4 and ranked #21 in the AP Poll and #20 in the Coach's Poll. For his efforts in leading ASU to a Pac-12 South championship, Graham received the 2013 Pac-12 Coach of the Year Award. In 2014, ASU finished with yet another 10-win season by going 10–3 and ranking #12 in the final AP Poll and #14 in the final Coaches Poll. The season was capped off with Graham leading the Sun Devils to victory over Duke University in the Sun Bowl.

The 2015 season saw a big drop off for the program as the Sun Devils finished a disappointing 6–7 with a 43–42 loss to the West Virginia Mountaineers in the Cactus Bowl. The trend continued into the next two seasons. The Sun Devils finished 2016 on a 6-game losing streak, which culminated in a 5–7 record. 2017 would be Graham's final season. The team improved only slightly, finishing 7–6. Graham and Arizona State agreed to part ways after winning the last regular-season game of the year against rival Arizona, and retaining the Territorial Cup. The Sun Bowl against North Carolina State would be his last game as Arizona State head coach. The result was a 52–31 loss to the Wolfpack.

=== Hawaii ===
On January 21, 2020, Graham was hired by the University of Hawaii as the 24th head football coach in the school's history after being away from college football for two years.

Graham's first season was impacted by the COVID-19 pandemic which saw spring football canceled just three days before it began, and the 2020 season also started late with a shortened training camp. Nevertheless, Graham's team slowly gelled together after a slow start, notably pulling off a huge upset over previously undefeated Nevada. Graham also became the first Hawaii coach since Bob Wagner in 1987 to win his debut, doing so with a win over rival Fresno State. The win eventually secured a spot in the New Mexico Bowl, played in Frisco, Texas, his 11th bowl appearance in 13 seasons as a head coach. Hawaii eventually upset Dana Holgorsen's Houston Cougars, 28–14, securing his 100th win as a head coach, his sixth bowl victory, and his first victory over Holgorsen.

Graham's second season started much like his first: a slow start saw only one win over FCS school Portland State, and two losses to Pac-12 schools UCLA and Oregon State, with the defense allowing over 30 points in each game. However, over the next three games, Hawaii's defense only gave up an average of 21 points; despite losing to defending Mountain West champion San Jose State on the final play of a 17–13 defeat, the Rainbow Warriors rebounded with a dominant performance against former WAC foe New Mexico State, winning 41–21. The next week saw Graham nab a second signature win on homecoming night, a 27–24 upset of 18th-ranked Fresno State, marking the third time Hawaii had beaten a ranked Bulldogs team, and the first win over a ranked team since 2010. It additionally was the first home win over the Bulldogs for the first time since 2007, ending a six-game losing streak. Despite finishing with a 6–7 record, the team reclaimed the Paniolo Trophy, doing so with a 38–14 victory over Wyoming, the team's first win in Laramie since 1991. It also secured a second consecutive postseason appearance in the Hawaii Bowl, and a program-record fourth straight bowl game against Memphis as a conditionally-eligible team after the NCAA added an extra bowl game to accommodate all deserving teams. Graham opted out of the game a day before it was to be played, alleging COVID-19 concerns.

After the 2021 season, multiple Hawaii players alleged mistreatment by Graham. One player said, "Graham has killed our love and passion of football." This led to numerous Hawaii players entering the transfer portal, including his son, Michael Graham. The curiosity over the transfers even led to a meeting by the Hawaii State Senate inquiring about the issue on January 7, 2022. The meeting included a group of players and family testifying, with numerous accounts criticizing Graham and his conduct. The allegations included such enormities as him saying those playing the ukulele were "fucking annoying", describing players as "porch monkeys" and "pineapple pickers", and calling Hawaii a "third world country" for not having Dr Pepper in the vending machines.

Graham resigned from Hawaii on January 14, 2022, having completed his second year of a five-year contract and an 11–11 record amidst controversy of mistreatment of players. In a statement, Graham said his resignation was "what [was] best" for himself, his family, and his health.

=== TCU ===
In July 2024, TCU coach Sonny Dykes added Graham as an analyst. He said Graham would work with the Horned Frogs offense because of his defensive background.

== Personal life ==
During his two-year hiatus from coaching from 2018 to 2019, Graham visited numerous NFL and NCAA coaches, including Bill Belichick and Mike Norvell, to keep up to date with the game.

In September 2025, Graham was reportedly interested in seeking the Republican nomination for Arizona's 1st congressional district in the 2026 elections. Graham reportedly still maintains a residence in Arizona.

== Coaching tree ==
=== Head coaches Graham served under ===
- Hank Walbrick: East Central (1991–1993)
- Rich Rodriguez: West Virginia (2001–2002)
- Steve Kragthorpe: Tulsa (2003–2005)

=== Assistant coaches under Graham who became college head coaches ===
- Major Applewhite: Houston (2016–2018), South Alabama (2024–present)
- Chris Ball: Northern Arizona (2019–2023)
- David Beaty: Kansas (2015–2018)
- Bill Blankenship: Tulsa (2011–2014)
- Kenny Dillingham: Arizona State (2023–present)
- Tony Gibson: Marshall (2025–present)
- G. J. Kinne: Incarnate Word (2022), Texas State (2023–present)
- Dan Lanning: Oregon (2022–present)
- Chip Lindsey: Troy (2019–2021)
- Van Malone: Hampton (2026–present)
- Gus Malzahn: Arkansas State (2012), Auburn (2013–2020), UCF (2021–2024)
- Brennan Marion: Sacramento State (2025)
- Chad Morris: SMU (2015–2017), Arkansas (2018–2019)
- Billy Napier: Louisiana (2018–2021), Florida (2022–2025), James Madison (2026-present)
- Jay Norvell: Nevada (2017–2021), Colorado State (2022–2025)
- Mike Norvell: Memphis (2016–2019), Florida State (2020–present)
- Keith Patterson: Abilene Christian (2022–present)
- Rich Rodriguez: Jacksonville State (2022–2024), West Virginia (2025–present)
- Ryan Silverfield: Memphis (2019–2025), Arkansas (2026–present)
- Jake Spavital: Texas State (2019–2022)

== Head coaching record ==
=== College ===
Year	Team	Overall	Conference	Standing	Bowl/playoffs	Coaches^{#}	AP^{°}
Rice Owls (Conference USA) (2006)
2006	Rice	7–6	6–2	2nd (West)	L New Orleans		
Rice:		7–6	6–2				
Tulsa Golden Hurricane (Conference USA) (2007–2010)
2007	Tulsa	10–4	6–3	1st (West)	W GMAC		
2008	Tulsa	11–3	7–2	T–1st (West)	W GMAC		
2009	Tulsa	5–7	3–5	3rd (West)			
2010	Tulsa	10–3	6–2	T–1st (West)	W Hawaii		24
Tulsa:		36–17	22–12				
Pittsburgh Panthers (Big East Conference) (2011)
2011	Pittsburgh	6–6	4–3	T–4th	BBVA Compass^{A}		
Pittsburgh:		6–6	4–3				
Arizona State Sun Devils (Pac-12 Conference) (2012–2017)
2012	Arizona State	8–5	5–4	T–2nd (South)	W Fight Hunger		
2013	Arizona State	10–4	8–1	1st (South)	L Holiday	20	21
2014	Arizona State	10–3	6–3	T–2nd (South)	W Sun	14	12
2015	Arizona State	6–7	4–5	4th (South)	L Cactus		
2016	Arizona State	5–7	2–7	T–4th (South)			
2017	Arizona State	7–6	6–3	2nd (South)	L Sun		
Arizona State:		46–32	31–23				
Hawaii Rainbow Warriors (Mountain West Conference) (2020–2021)
2020	Hawaii	5–4	4–4	5th	W New Mexico		
2021	Hawaii	6–7	3–5	T-4th (West)	C ^{B} Hawaii		
Hawaii:		11–11	7–9				
Total:		106–72					
National championship Conference title Conference division title or championship game berth
^{#}Rankings from final Coaches Poll.; ^{°}Rankings from final AP Poll.

- ^A Graham resigned before Pittsburgh's 2011 bowl game.
- ^B The game was canceled due to COVID-19 and other issues within the team.
