= Poteet High School =

Poteet High School may refer to:

- Poteet High School (Poteet, Texas)
- Poteet High School (Mesquite, Texas) (Dallas-Fort Worth area)

== See also ==
- Poteet Independent School District
