= Grant Stuard =

American football player (born 1998)

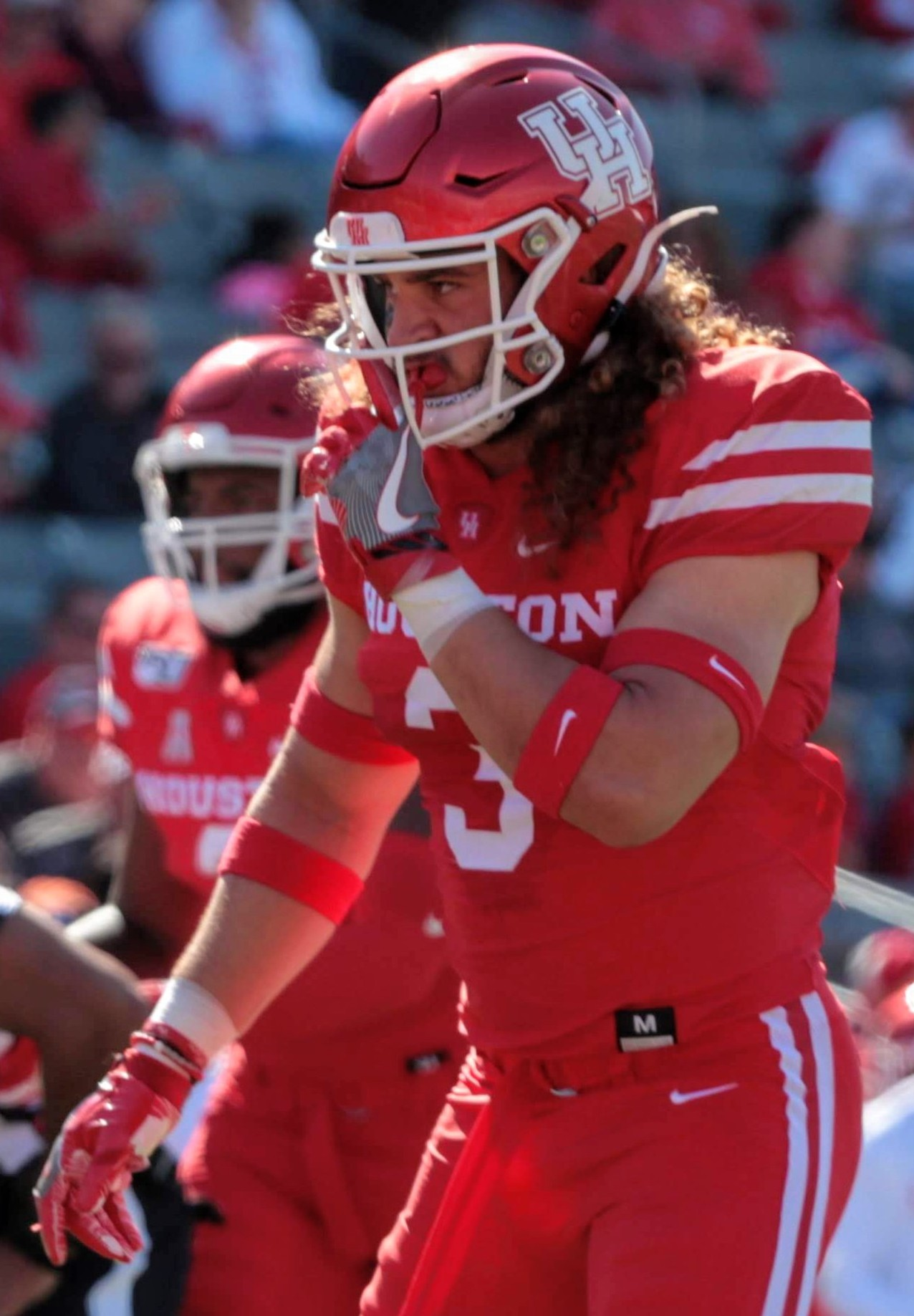
- Stuard with the Houston Cougars in 2019

No. 44 – Los Angeles Rams
- Position: Inside linebacker
- Roster status: Active

Personal information
- Born: October 15, 1998 (age 28); Conroe, Texas, U.S.
- Listed height: 5 ft 11 in (1.80 m)
- Listed weight: 230 lb (104 kg)

Career information
- High school: Oak Ridge (Conroe)
- College: Houston (2017–2020)
- NFL draft: 2021: 7th round, 259th overall pick

Career history
- Tampa Bay Buccaneers (2021); Indianapolis Colts (2022–2024); Detroit Lions (2025); Los Angeles Rams (2026–present)

Awards and highlights
- First-team All-AAC (2020); Second-team All-AAC (2019)

Career NFL statistics as of Week 10, 2026
- Total tackles: 95
- Forced fumbles: 1
- Defensive touchdowns: 1
- Stats at Pro Football Reference

Grant Stuard (born October 15, 1998) is an American professional football inside linebacker for the Los Angeles Rams of the National Football League (NFL). He played college football for the Houston Cougars and was selected by the Tampa Bay Buccaneers with the final pick in the 2021 NFL draft, making him that year's Mr. Irrelevant.

== Early life ==
Stuard helped take care of his four siblings while growing up, as his mother battled a drug addiction and his father spent time in prison.

== College career ==
Stuard played four years with the University of Houston, primarily as a linebacker, although he also played some fullback.

As a freshman during the 2017 season, he recorded two assisted tackles both against Rice University and played in seven games before suffering a torn meniscus which caused him to miss four games as well as the 2017 Hawaii Bowl. In 2018, Stuard played 13 games and had one start and led the Cougars with 11 special teams tackles. He also played running back late in the year. For the season, he had five attempts and 35 yards running the ball, along with 30 tackles, 18 solo and 12 assisted. In the 2019 season, Stuard started all 12 games and had a team-leading 97 tackles including 9.5 tackles for loss, good for third in the American Athletic Conference (AAC), and also added one sack and four pass deflections. Stuard was named to the 2019 All-AAC Second-team. As a senior team captain in 2020, Stuard led the Cougars in tackles with 61 total (including 35 solo) during the COVID-shortened 7-game regular season. His 8.4 tackles per game led the AAC. For his senior season, he changed his uniform number from 3 to 0.

Stuard skipped the 2020 New Mexico Bowl to prepare for the upcoming NFL draft.

== Professional career ==
Pre-draft measurables
Height	Weight	Arm length	Hand span	Wingspan	Bench press
5 ft 11 1/2 in (1.82 m)	230 lb (104 kg)	29 1/2 in (0.75 m)	9 3/8 in (0.24 m)	6 ft 1 in (1.85 m)	28 reps
All values from Pro Day

=== Tampa Bay Buccaneers ===
The Tampa Bay Buccaneers chose Stuard with the final pick (259th overall) of the 2021 NFL draft, making him that year's Mr. Irrelevant. Stuard signed his four-year rookie contract with Tampa Bay on May 13, 2021. He played in all 17 games during the regular season and contributed 15 total tackles with a forced fumble.

=== Indianapolis Colts ===
On August 30, 2022, Stuard and a seventh-round pick were traded to the Indianapolis Colts for a sixth-round pick. On December 3, 2023, Stuard scored his first NFL touchdown on an 18-yard blocked punt return during the Colts' 31-28 overtime victory over the Tennessee Titans in Week 13. On October 20, 2024, Stuard made his first NFL start and had a team-leading 19 tackles in a 16-10 win against the Miami Dolphins. Stuard made five starts in total at linebacker for Indianapolis in 2024, recording 40 total tackles that season.

=== Detroit Lions ===
On March 13, 2025, Stuard signed with the Detroit Lions. Playing primarily on special teams, Stuard had 19 total tackles and also had three kick returns for 72 total yards.

=== Los Angeles Rams ===
On March 16, 2026, Stuard signed a two-year, $4.45 million contract with the Los Angeles Rams.

== In the media ==
Stuard appeared in a television advertisement for Uber Eats during his rookie season; the ad humorously referenced his Mr. Irrelevant status by cutting him off as he is about to say his own name.
