= Payton Turner =

American football player (born 1999)

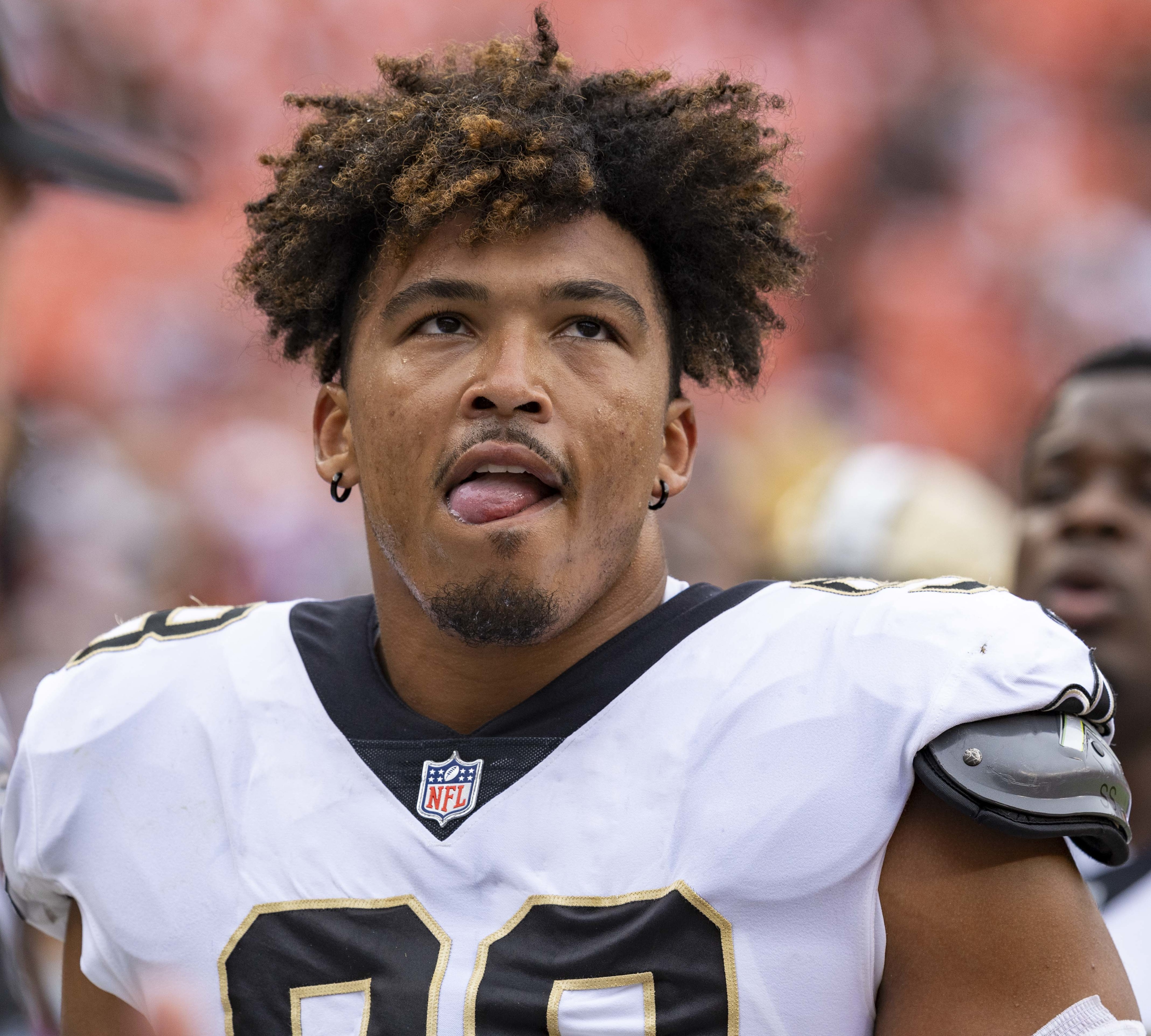
- Turner with the New Orleans Saints in 2021

No. 92 – Detroit Lions
- Position: Defensive end
- Roster status: Injured reserve

Personal information
- Born: January 7, 1999 (age 27); Houston, Texas, U.S.
- Listed height: 6 ft 6 in (1.98 m)
- Listed weight: 275 lb (125 kg)

Career information
- High school: Westside (Houston)
- College: Houston (2017–2020)
- NFL draft: 2021: 1st round, 28th overall pick

Career history
- New Orleans Saints (2021–2024); Dallas Cowboys (2025); Detroit Lions (2026–present)

Awards and highlights
- Second-team All-AAC (2020)

Career NFL statistics as of 2026
- Total tackles: 50
- Sacks: 5.0
- Forced fumbles: 2
- Fumble recoveries: 1
- Pass deflections: 4
- Stats at Pro Football Reference

Payton Turner (born January 7, 1999) is an American professional football defensive end for the Detroit Lions of the National Football League (NFL). He played college football for the Houston Cougars and was selected by the New Orleans Saints in the first round of the 2021 NFL draft.

== Early life ==
Turner grew up in Houston, Texas and attended Westside High School, where he played basketball and football.

== College career ==
Turner was a member of the Houston Cougars for four seasons, starting his final three years. He was a member of the Cougars' pass rush rotation during his freshman year and finished the season with 14 tackles, one sack and one interception. His sophomore season ended prematurely due to a foot injury. As a senior, Turner was named second team All-American Athletic Conference after recording 25 tackles, 10.5 for a loss, with five sacks in five games played, missing two games due to injury and opting out of the New Mexico Bowl. After the season, Turner played in the 2021 Senior Bowl.

=== Statistics ===
Year	GP	Tackles					Interceptions					Fumbles			
Year	GP	Solo	Ast	Total	Loss	Sack	Int	Yards	Avg	TD	PD	FR	Yards	TD	FF
2017	8	10	4	14	2	1	1	0	0	0	1	0	0	0	0
2018	11	21	21	42	3.5	0	0	0	0	0	4	0	0	0	0
2019	12	20	13	33	7.5	3.5	0	0	0	0	4	0	0	0	0
2020	5	17	8	25	10.5	5	0	0	0	0	0	0	0	0	1

== Professional career ==
Pre-draft measurables
Height	Weight	Arm length	Hand span	Wingspan	20-yard shuttle	Three-cone drill	Vertical jump	Bench press
6 ft 5 3/8 in (1.97 m)	270 lb (122 kg)	35 in (0.89 m)	10 1/4 in (0.26 m)	7 ft 0 1/8 in (2.14 m)	4.31 s	7.01 s	35.5 in (0.90 m)	23 reps
All values from Pro Day

=== New Orleans Saints ===
Turner was selected by the New Orleans Saints in the first round (28th overall) of the 2021 NFL draft. He signed his four-year rookie contract with New Orleans on June 8, 2021. On November 11, 2021, Turner was placed on injured reserve with a shoulder injury.

On September 13, 2023, Turner was placed on injured reserve after suffering from a turf toe injury in the season opener against the Tennessee Titans. He was activated on January 5, 2024.

On May 2, 2024, the Saints declined to exercise the fifth-year option in Turner’s rookie contract, making him a free agent after the 2024 season.

=== Dallas Cowboys ===
On March 11, 2025, Turner signed a one-year, $2.5 million contract with the Dallas Cowboys. He was placed on injured reserve due to a rib injury on August 26.

=== Detroit Lions ===
On March 20, 2026, Turner signed a one-year, $1.145 million contract with the Detroit Lions. On August 27, Turner was placed on season-ending injured reserve due to a back injury.

== NFL career statistics ==
Regular season
Year	Team	Games		Tackles			
Year	Team	GP	GS	Cmb	Solo	Ast	Sck
2021	NO	5	0	12	9	3	1.0
2022	NO	8	0	16	11	5	2.0
2023	NO	2	0	1	0	1	0
2024	NO	16	0	21	10	11	2.0
2025	DAL	0	0	Did not play due to injury			
2026	DET	0	0	Did not play due to injury			
Total		31	0	50	30	20	5
