= Mekhi =

Mekhi is a masculine given name. Notable people with this name include:

== Sports ==
=== American football ===
- Mekhi Becton (born 1999), American football offensive tackle
- Mekhi Blackmon (born 1999), American football cornerback
- Mekhi Garner (born 2000), American football cornerback
- Mekhi Mews, American football wide receiver
- Mekhi Sargent (born 1997), American football running back
- Mekhi Wingo (born 2003), American football defensive tackle

=== Other sports ===
- Mekhi Leacock-McLeod (born 1996), English footballer
- Mekhi Lewis (born 1999), American freestyle wrestler

== Other ==
- Mekhi Phifer (born 1974), American actor
