= Malik Jefferson =

American football player (born 1996)

Profile
- Position: Linebacker

Personal information
- Born: November 15, 1996 (age 29); Mesquite, Texas, U.S.
- Listed height: 6 ft 2 in (1.88 m)
- Listed weight: 235 lb (107 kg)

Career information
- High school: Poteet (Mesquite, Texas)
- College: Texas (2015–2017)
- NFL draft: 2018: 3rd round, 78th overall pick

Career history
- Cincinnati Bengals (2018); Cleveland Browns (2019); Los Angeles Chargers (2019–2020)*; Tennessee Titans (2020)*; Los Angeles Chargers (2020); Indianapolis Colts (2021); Dallas Cowboys (2022–2023); Detroit Lions (2024)*
- * Offseason or practice squad member only

Awards and highlights
- Second-team All-American (2017); Big 12 Co-Defensive Player of the Year (2017); First-team All-Big 12 (2017); Second-team All-Big 12 (2016); Freshman All-American (2015); Big 12 Defensive Freshman of the Year (2015); Butkus Award (2014)

Career NFL statistics
- Total tackles: 19
- Stats at Pro Football Reference

Malik Terrell Jefferson (born November 15, 1996) is an American professional football linebacker. He played college football at Texas. As a senior at Poteet High School in Mesquite, Texas, Jefferson won the 2014 Butkus Award given to the best linebacker in high school. He has been a member of the Cincinnati Bengals, Cleveland Browns, Los Angeles Chargers, and Tennessee Titans of the National Football League (NFL).

== Early life ==
A native of Mesquite, Texas, Jefferson attended Poteet High School where he played football and baseball and competed in track and field. Playing defensive back as a sophomore in 2012, Jefferson registered 105 tackles, 24 tackles for loss, seven sacks, five forced fumbles, and four blocked kicks. Helping Poteet to an 11–3 record, including a 5–2 district mark and a UIL playoff berth, Jefferson was named Sophomore of the Year in District 10–4A and earned first-team All-Area honors by the Dallas Morning News. Poteet advanced to the 4A Division 2 quarterfinals, where they lost 21–13 to Daeshon Hall's Lancaster. In his junior year, Jefferson mostly played linebacker and was part of a defense that held nine opponents to 20 points or fewer. He tallied 93 tackles, 18 tackles for loss, 14 sacks, three forced fumbles, and three fumble recoveries, and was chosen Defensive MVP and first-team All-District 10–4A. Jefferson was also an honorable mention on the 4A All-State team by the Associated Press and Texas Sports Writers Association. Poteet finished the season with a 12–2 record, including a 6–1 district mark and an appearance in the 4A Division 2 quarterfinals, where they lost 43–14 to Terence Williams' Ennis. MaxPreps named Jefferson to their 2013 Junior All-American team.

After participating in Nike's 2014 The Opening in Eugene, Oregon, Jefferson started his senior season as preseason Defensive Player of the Year by Dave Campbell's Texas Football. He was credited with 81 tackles on the season, including six sacks and 16 tackles for loss, along with two forced fumbles and four blocked kicks, despite missing more than two games due to injury, along with three other second halves where the starters were removed. Poteet went undefeated 7–0 through its district schedule and finished the season 10–2, but was upset 27–24 in the 5A Division 2 area playoffs by The Colony. Jefferson was named first-team All-American by Parade and USA Today, and also won the High School Butkus Award for the nation's top linebacker. After season, he participated in the 2015 Under Armour All-America Game.

Regarded as a five-star recruit by both Rivals.com and Scout.com, either recruiting service also ranked him the No. 1 outside linebacker prospect of his class. With offers from every major program in the country, Jefferson narrowed his selection down to Baylor, Louisiana State, Texas, Texas A&M, and UCLA. On December 19, 2014, he committed to play football at University of Texas at Austin, and was labelled as Charlie Strong's “signature recruit.” He was an early enrollee arriving on campus in January 2015.

== College career ==
Jefferson played as a true freshman at Texas, and was named a Freshman All-American by Sporting News, and USA Today. Jefferson was also awarded as The Big 12 Conference Freshman Defensive Player of the Year for the 2015 season. On December 31, 2017, Jefferson declared his intentions to enter the 2018 NFL draft.

== Professional career ==
=== Pre-draft ===
On December 31, 2017, Jefferson released a statement through The Players' Tribune announcing his decision to forgo his remaining eligibility and enter the 2018 NFL draft. Jefferson ignored recommendations from the College Advisory Board to return to college and chose to enter the draft instead. He attended the NFL Scouting Combine in Indianapolis and completed the majority of drills, but opted to skip the three-cone drill and short shuttle. On March 28, 2018, he participated at Texas' pro day and performed the vertical jump (37"), short shuttle, and three-cone drill. At the conclusion of the pre-draft process, Jefferson was projected to be a second-round pick by NFL draft experts and scouts. He was ranked the second-best inside linebacker prospect in the draft by DraftScouts.com and was ranked the eighth-best linebacker by Scouts Inc. and Sports Illustrated.

External videos
- Malik Jefferson's Combine Workout
- Malik Jefferson's 40-yard dash

Pre-draft measurables
Height	Weight	Arm length	Hand span	Wingspan	40-yard dash	10-yard split	20-yard split	20-yard shuttle	Three-cone drill	Vertical jump	Broad jump	Bench press
6 ft 2 1/4 in (1.89 m)	236 lb (107 kg)	32 in (0.81 m)	9 5/8 in (0.24 m)	6 ft 2 1/4 in (1.89 m)	4.52 s	1.59 s	2.67 s	4.18 s	7.12 s	37.0 in (0.94 m)	10 ft 5 in (3.18 m)	27 reps
All values from NFL Combine/Pro Day

=== Cincinnati Bengals ===
The Cincinnati Bengals selected Jefferson in the third round (78th overall) of the 2018 NFL draft. Jefferson was the 11th linebacker drafted in 2018.

External videos
- Bengals draft Malik Jefferson 78th overall

On June 21, 2018, the Bengals signed Jefferson to a four-year, $3.59 million contract that includes a signing bonus of $923,728. He played in 10 games before being placed on injured reserve on December 18 with a foot injury.

Jefferson was waived during final roster cuts on August 31, 2019.

=== Cleveland Browns ===
Jefferson was claimed off waivers by the Cleveland Browns on September 1, 2019. On November 12, Jefferson was waived by the Browns.

=== Los Angeles Chargers (first stint) ===
On November 25, 2019, Jefferson was signed to the practice squad of the Los Angeles Chargers. He signed a futures contract with the Chargers on December 30.

On September 5, 2020, Jefferson was waived by the Chargers.

=== Tennessee Titans ===
On September 9, 2020, Jefferson was signed to the Tennessee Titans' practice squad, but was released five days later.

=== Los Angeles Chargers (second stint) ===
On September 16, 2020, Jefferson was signed to the Los Angeles Chargers' practice squad. He was promoted to the active roster on September 26. On January 1, 2021, Jefferson was placed on injured reserve. He was waived after the season on March 12.

=== Indianapolis Colts ===
On May 5, 2021, Jefferson signed with the Indianapolis Colts. He was waived by Indianapolis on August 31, and was re-signed to the team's practice squad the following day. Jefferson was promoted to the active roster on December 15. He was waived by the Colts on January 4, 2022. Jefferson signed a reserve/future contract with Indianapolis on January 10. He was released by the team on May 10.

=== Dallas Cowboys ===
On July 14, 2022, Jefferson signed with the Dallas Cowboys. On August 30, he was waived and signed to the practice squad the next day. On December 14, the Cowboys released Jefferson. On December 20, he was re-signed to the team's practice squad. On January 30, 2023, Jefferson was released by Dallas.

On February 8, 2023, the Cowboys signed Jefferson to a reserve/future contract. He was waived by Indianapolis on August 29, and was subsequently re-signed to the team's practice squad. Jefferson was not signed to a reserve/future contract after the season and thus became a free agent when his practice squad contract expired.

=== Detroit Lions ===
On July 27, 2024, Jefferson signed with the Detroit Lions. On August 20, he was placed on injured reserve and later released.
