= Cam Lampkin =

American football player (born 2001)

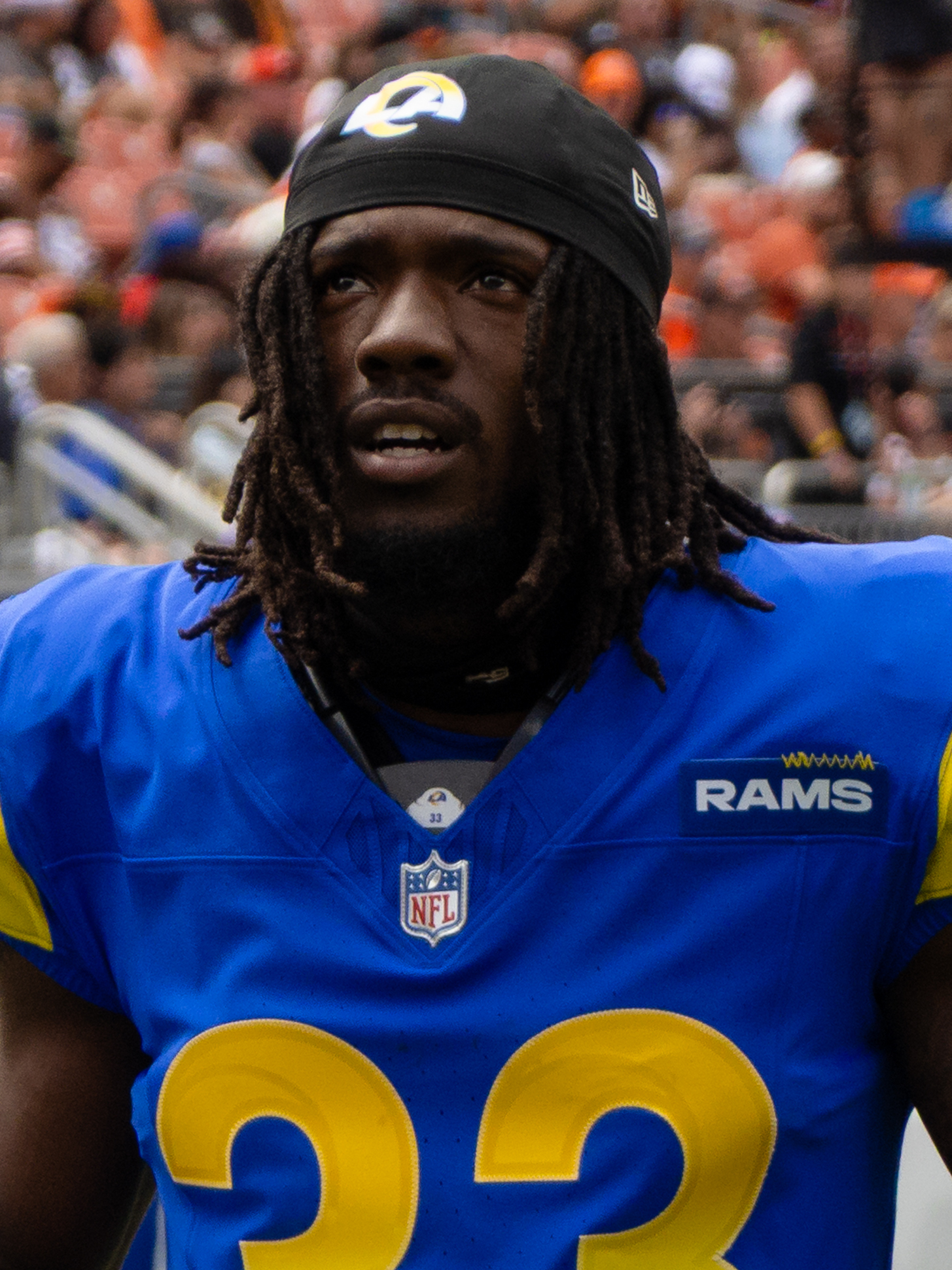
- Lampkin with the Los Angeles Rams in 2025

No. 21 – Los Angeles Rams
- Position: Cornerback
- Roster status: Active

Personal information
- Born: July 31, 2001 (age 25); Mesquite, Texas, U.S.
- Listed height: 5 ft 11 in (1.80 m)
- Listed weight: 174 lb (79 kg)

Career information
- High school: Poteet (Mesquite, Texas)
- College: Utah State (2019–2021); Washington State (2022–2023)
- NFL draft: 2024: undrafted

Career history
- Los Angeles Rams (2024–present)
- Stats at Pro Football Reference

Cam Lampkin (born July 31, 2001) is an American professional football cornerback for the Los Angeles Rams of the National Football League (NFL). He played college football for the Utah State Aggies and Washington State Cougars.

== Early life ==
Lampkin was born on July 31, 2001, and grew up in Mesquite, Texas. He attended Poteet High School where he played football as a wide receiver, cornerback and occasionally at quarterback. He was named 5A-1 Region II First-team All-District 7 as a junior and repeated as a senior, after having totaled 608 receiving yards and six touchdowns, one rushing touchdown and a return touchdown in his last season. He also competed in basketball and track and field at Poteet. A three-star recruit, he committed to play college football for the Utah State Aggies.

== College career ==
Lampkin appeared in all 13 games, two as a starter, for Utah State during the 2019 season, recording 10 tackles, two pass breakups and an interception. He played six games, four as a starter, in 2020, posting 20 tackles, 2.0 tackles-for-loss (TFLs), 1.0 sacks and two pass breakups. He became a full-time starter in 2021, ending with 43 tackles and tying for the team-high with six pass breakups in 13 starts. Following the 2021 season, he opted to transfer to the Washington State Cougars.

Lampkin recorded nine tackles and one pass breakup while seeing limited playing time for the Cougars in 2022. In his senior year, Lampkin made 34 tackles, a team-leading eight pass breakups, and 1.5 TFLs while starting all 12 games. He declared for the 2024 NFL draft after the season.

== Professional career ==
Pre-draft measurables
| Height | Weight | Arm length | Hand span | Wingspan | 40-yard dash | 10-yard split | 20-yard split | 20-yard shuttle | Three-cone drill | Vertical jump | Broad jump | Bench press |
|---|---|---|---|---|---|---|---|---|---|---|---|---|
| 5 ft 9 3/4 in (1.77 m) | 181 lb (82 kg) | 29 3/4 in (0.76 m) | 8 7/8 in (0.23 m) | 6 ft 0 1/8 in (1.83 m) | 4.58 s | 1.60 s | 2.70 s | 4.33 s | 7.09 s | 34.5 in (0.88 m) | 10 ft 0 in (3.05 m) | 11 reps |
All values from Pro Day

After going unselected in the 2024 NFL draft, Lampkin signed with the Los Angeles Rams as an undrafted free agent. He was waived on August 27, 2024, then re-signed to the practice squad the following day. On September 14, prior to the Rams' Week 2 game against the Arizona Cardinals, Lampkin was signed to the active roster from the practice squad. He was waived on October 1, and re-signed to the practice squad. Lampkin signed a reserve/future contract with the Rams on January 20, 2025.

On August 26, 2025, Lampkin was waived by the Rams as part of final roster cuts and re-signed to the practice squad the next day. On January 27, 2026, he signed a reserve/futures contract with Los Angeles.

On August 30, 2026, Lampkin was waived by the Rams as a part of final roster cuts; he was re-signed to the team's practice squad the following day. On November 3, he was signed to the active roster.
