= Mekhi Garner =

American football player (born 2000)

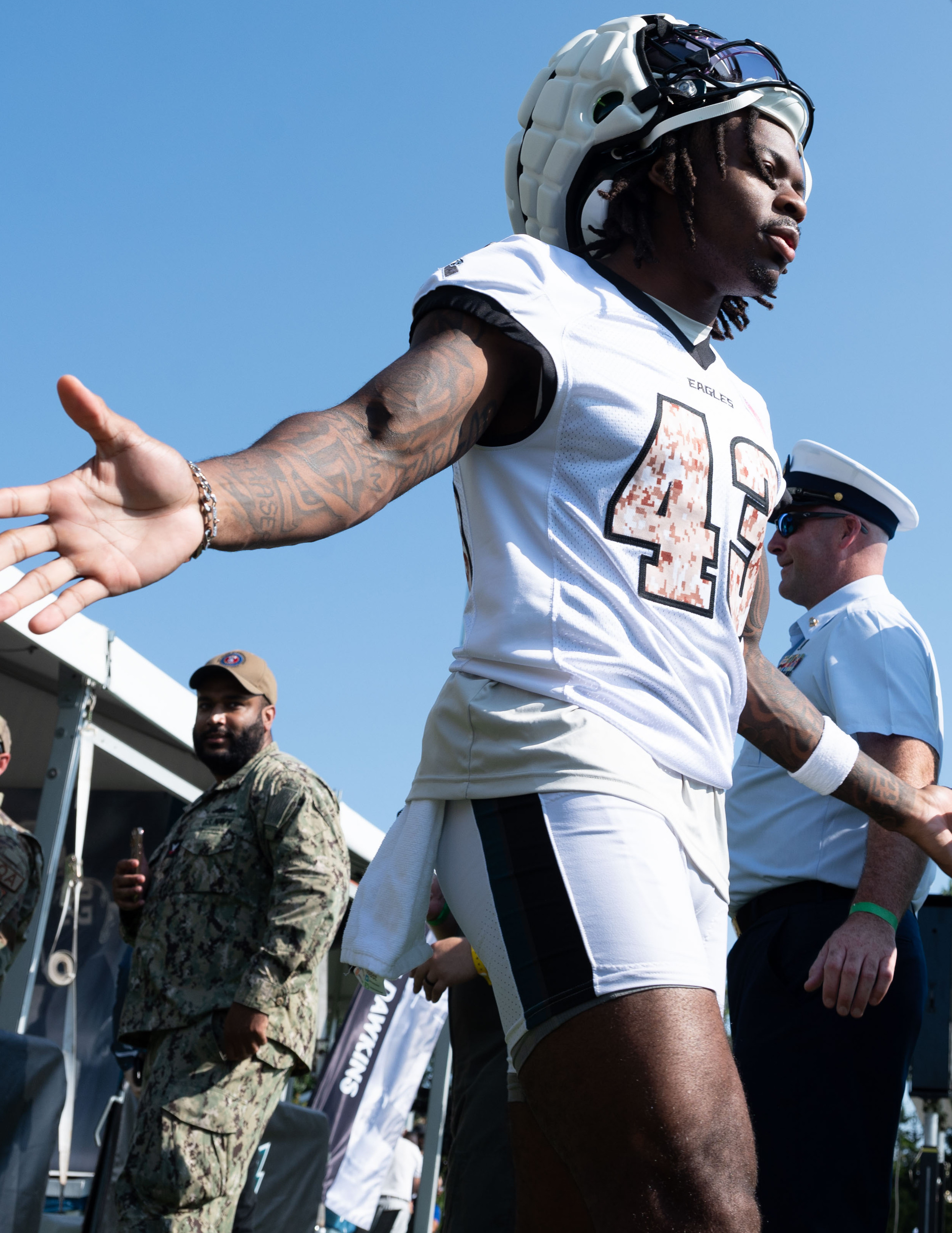
- Garner in 2024

Profile
- Position: Cornerback

Personal information
- Born: January 11, 2000 (age 26); Dallas, Texas, U.S.
- Listed height: 6 ft 2 in (1.88 m)
- Listed weight: 213 lb (97 kg)

Career information
- High school: Poteet (TX)
- College: Navarro (2018); Louisiana (2019–2021); LSU (2022)
- NFL draft: 2023: undrafted

Career history
- Philadelphia Eagles (2023–2024); Arlington Renegades (2025)*; Chicago Bears (2025)*; Louisville Kings (2026)
- * Offseason or practice squad member only

Awards and highlights
- UFL champion (2026); Third-team All-Sun Belt (2021)

Career NFL statistics as of 2025
- Games played: 3
- Stats at Pro Football Reference

Mekhi Garner (born January 11, 2000) is an American professional football cornerback. He played college football for the Navarro Bulldogs, Louisiana Ragin' Cajuns and LSU Tigers.

== Early life ==
Garner was born on January 11, 2000, in Dallas, Texas. He attended Poteet High School in Mesquite and played defensive back, recording as a junior 39 tackles, six pass breakups, two interceptions and a forced fumble. He initially committed to play college football for the Texas Tech Red Raiders, but eventually decided to begin his college career at Navarro.

== College career ==
Garner spent his freshman year, 2018, at Navarro College. He appeared in 10 games, posting 48 tackles, five pass breakups, two interceptions and 0.5 tackles-for-loss. He joined the Louisiana Ragin' Cajuns after one season at Navarro. In his first season there, Garner played two games and totaled four tackles. Originally a backup to begin the 2020 season, he was thrust into a starting role due to several players contracting COVID-19 and his performance there led to him remaining a starter. He finished the season with 11 games played, eight as a starter, with 27 tackles, three interceptions (second on the team), seven pass breakups (second on the team), one sack and one tackle-for-loss, being named honorable mention all-conference.

In 2021, Garner played in 13 games, starting 11, and earned third-team All-Sun Belt Conference honors as he compiled 31 tackles, 2.5 tackles-for-loss, eight pass breakups, a forced fumble and a sack. He transferred to LSU in 2022. In his only season with the team, he posted 43 tackles, 1.5 tackles-for-loss and eight pass breakups while starting all 13 games. His eight pass breakups lead the team. Although Garner had a remaining year of eligibility, he opted to declare for the NFL draft while accepting an invitation to the East–West Shrine Bowl.

== Professional career ==
Pre-draft measurables
Height	Weight	Arm length	Hand span	Wingspan	40-yard dash	10-yard split	20-yard split	20-yard shuttle	Three-cone drill	Vertical jump	Broad jump	Bench press
6 ft 2 in (1.88 m)	212 lb (96 kg)	32 1/4 in (0.82 m)	10 1/8 in (0.26 m)	6 ft 6 in (1.98 m)	4.55 s	1.54 s	2.61 s	4.29 s	6.94 s	38.5 in (0.98 m)	10 ft 8 in (3.25 m)	12 reps
All values from NFL Combine/Pro Day

=== Philadelphia Eagles ===
After going unselected in the 2023 NFL draft, Garner signed with the Philadelphia Eagles as an undrafted free agent. On August 29, 2023, he was released due to final roster cuts and re-signed to the practice squad the following day. He signed a reserve/future contract on January 18, 2024. Garner was waived with an injury designation on August 17.

On December 31, 2024, the Eagles re-signed Garner to their practice squad. He was released on January 9, 2025.

=== Arlington Renegades ===
On March 6, 2025, Garner signed with the Arlington Renegades of the United Football League (UFL). He was released by the team on March 20.

=== Chicago Bears ===
On August 12, 2025, Garner signed with the Chicago Bears. On August 26, he was waived as part of final roster cuts and re-signed to the practice squad the following day. However, Garner was released by Chicago on August 28.

=== Louisville Kings ===
On January 29, 2026, Garner signed with the Louisville Kings of the United Football League (UFL).
