= 2020 Houston Cougars football team =

American college football season

2020 Houston Cougars football

New Mexico Bowl, L 14–28 vs. Hawaii
- Conference: American Athletic Conference
- Record: 3–5 (3–3 American)
- Head coach: Dana Holgorsen (2nd season)
- Offensive coordinator: Shannon Dawson (1st season)
- Co-offensive coordinator: Brandon Jones (2nd season)
- Offensive scheme: Spread
- Defensive coordinator: Joe Cauthen (2nd season)
- Co-defensive coordinator: Doug Belk (2nd season)
- Base defense: 4–2–5
- Home stadium: TDECU Stadium

2020 American Athletic Conference football standings
| | Conf. | | | Overall |
| Team | W | | L | W | | L |
|---|---|---|---|---|---|---|
| No. 8 Cincinnati y$ | 6 | – | 0 | 9 | – | 1 |
| Tulsa y | 6 | – | 0 | 6 | – | 3 |
| Memphis | 5 | – | 3 | 8 | – | 3 |
| UCF | 5 | – | 3 | 6 | – | 4 |
| SMU | 4 | – | 3 | 7 | – | 3 |
| Houston | 3 | – | 3 | 3 | – | 5 |
| Navy | 3 | – | 4 | 3 | – | 7 |
| Tulane | 3 | – | 5 | 6 | – | 6 |
| East Carolina | 3 | – | 5 | 3 | – | 6 |
| Temple | 1 | – | 6 | 1 | – | 6 |
| South Florida | 0 | – | 7 | 1 | – | 8 |
Championship: Cincinnati 27, Tulsa 24
$ – Conference champion; y – Championship game participant; Rankings from AP Poll.

The 2020 Houston Cougars football team represented the University of Houston in the 2020 NCAA Division I FBS football season. The Cougars played their home games at TDECU Stadium in Houston, Texas, and competed in the American Athletic Conference. They were led by second-year head coach Dana Holgorsen.

== Preseason ==
=== Recruiting class ===
College recruiting information
| Name | Hometown | School | Height | Weight | Commit date |
|---|---|---|---|---|---|
| Derek Bowman; Offensive lineman | Magnolia, TX | Magnolia HS | 6 ft 5 in (1.96 m) | 270 lb (120 kg) | Dec 18, 2019 |
| Derek Bowman; Offensive lineman | Recruit ratings: Scout: Rivals: 247Sports: ESPN: | | | | |
| Nathaniel Dell; Wide receiver | Daytona Beach, FL | Mainland HS; Independence CC | 5 ft 10 in (1.78 m) | 155 lb (70 kg) | Dec 18, 2019 |
| Nathaniel Dell; Wide receiver | Recruit ratings: Scout: Rivals: 247Sports: ESPN: | | | | |
| Darius Edmonds; Wide receiver | Humble, TX | Atascocita HS | 6 ft 4 in (1.93 m) | 205 lb (93 kg) | Dec 18, 2019 |
| Darius Edmonds; Wide receiver | Recruit ratings: Scout: Rivals: 247Sports: ESPN: | | | | |
| James Faminu; Offensive lineman | London, UK | London Academy | 6 ft 6 in (1.98 m) | 350 lb (160 kg) | Dec 18, 2019 |
| James Faminu; Offensive lineman | Recruit ratings: Scout: Rivals: 247Sports: ESPN: | | | | |
| D'Anthony Jones; Linebacker | Long Beach, CA | Leuzinger HS; Long Beach CC | 6 ft 2 in (1.88 m) | 255 lb (116 kg) | Feb 5, 2020 |
| D'Anthony Jones; Linebacker | Recruit ratings: Scout: Rivals: 247Sports: ESPN: | | | | |
| Sofian Massoud; Quarterback | Katy, TX | Cypress Lakes HS | 6 ft 1 in (1.85 m) | 190 lb (86 kg) | Dec 18, 2019 |
| Sofian Massoud; Quarterback | Recruit ratings: Scout: Rivals: 247Sports: ESPN: | | | | |
| Ugonna Nnanna; Offensive lineman | Arlington, TX | Seguin HS | 6 ft 4 in (1.93 m) | 265 lb (120 kg) | Dec 18, 2019 |
| Ugonna Nnanna; Offensive lineman | Recruit ratings: Scout: Rivals: 247Sports: ESPN: | | | | |
| Chidozie "Dot" Nwankwo; Defensive Tackle | Richmond, TX | Foster HS | 5 ft 11 in (1.80 m) | 293 lb (133 kg) | Dec 18, 2019 |
| Chidozie "Dot" Nwankwo; Defensive Tackle | Recruit ratings: Scout: Rivals: 247Sports: ESPN: | | | | |
| Dylan Robinson; Wide receiver | Humble, TX | Atascocita HS | 6 ft 1 in (1.85 m) | 190 lb (86 kg) | Dec 18, 2019 |
| Dylan Robinson; Wide receiver | Recruit ratings: Scout: Rivals: 247Sports: ESPN: | | | | |
| Malik Robinson; Linebacker | Snellville, GA | South Gwinnett HS; North Carolina; Fort Scott CC | 6 ft 0 in (1.83 m) | 220 lb (100 kg) | Dec 18, 2019 |
| Malik Robinson; Linebacker | Recruit ratings: Scout: Rivals: 247Sports: ESPN: | | | | |
| Jayce Rogers; Cornerback | Valdosta, GA | Valdosta HS; Northwest Mississippi CC | 5 ft 8 in (1.73 m) | 165 lb (75 kg) | Dec 18, 2019 |
| Jayce Rogers; Cornerback | Recruit ratings: Scout: Rivals: 247Sports: ESPN: | | | | |
| Stacy Sneed; Running back | Arlington, TX | Mansfield Timberview HS | 5 ft 11 in (1.80 m) | 175 lb (79 kg) | Dec 18, 2019 |
| Stacy Sneed; Running back | Recruit ratings: Scout: Rivals: 247Sports: ESPN: | | | | |
| JoVanni Stewart; Safety | Katy, TX | Katy HS; West Virginia | 5 ft 8 in (1.73 m) | 195 lb (88 kg) | Dec 18, 2019 |
| JoVanni Stewart; Safety | Recruit ratings: Scout: Rivals: 247Sports: ESPN: | | | | |
| Trevonte Sylvester; Tight end | Breaux Bridge, LA | Breaux Bridge HS | 6 ft 5 in (1.96 m) | 220 lb (100 kg) | Dec 18, 2019 |
| Trevonte Sylvester; Tight end | Recruit ratings: Scout: Rivals: 247Sports: ESPN: | | | | |
| Khiyon Wafer; Wide receiver | Frisco, TX | Independence HS | 6 ft 1 in (1.85 m) | 180 lb (82 kg) | Feb 5, 2020 |
| Khiyon Wafer; Wide receiver | Recruit ratings: Scout: Rivals: 247Sports: ESPN: | | | | |
| Mike Welch; Safety | Dickinson, TX | Dickinson HS | 5 ft 10 in (1.78 m) | 180 lb (82 kg) | Feb 5, 2020 |
| Mike Welch; Safety | Recruit ratings: Scout: Rivals: 247Sports: ESPN: | | | | |
| Laine Wilkins; Punter | Perth, Australia | ProKick Australia | 6 ft 2 in (1.88 m) | 203 lb (92 kg) | Dec 18, 2019 |
| Laine Wilkins; Punter | Recruit ratings: Scout: Rivals: 247Sports: ESPN: | | | | |
| Sedrick Williams; Defensive Tackle | Houma, LA | Ellender Memorial HS; Kilgore College | 6 ft 1 in (1.85 m) | 302 lb (137 kg) | Dec 18, 2019 |
| Sedrick Williams; Defensive Tackle | Recruit ratings: Scout: Rivals: 247Sports: ESPN: | | | | |
| Reuben Unije; Offensive lineman | Bradenton, FL | IMG Academy; Illinois | 6 ft 5 in (1.96 m) | 303 lb (137 kg) | Feb 5, 2020 |
| Reuben Unije; Offensive lineman | Recruit ratings: Scout: Rivals: 247Sports: ESPN: | | | | |

=== AAC preseason media poll ===
The preseason Poll was released September 1

Media poll
| Predicted finish | Team | Votes (1st place) |
| 1 | UCF | 204 (10) |
| 2 | Cincinnati | 201 (7) |
| 3 | Memphis | 192 (2) |
| 4 | SMU | 146 |
| 5 | Navy | 125 (1) |
| 6 | Tulane | 118 |
| 7 | Houston | 114 |
| 8 | Temple | 88 |
| 9 | Tulsa | 49 |
| 10 | East Carolina | 42 |
| 11 | South Florida | 41 |

== Roster ==
2020 Houston Cougars football team roster
Players
Coaches
Offense }

| Pos. | # | Name | Class |
|---|---|---|---|
| WR | 1 | Bryson Smith | Jr |
| WR | 2 | Keith Corbin | Sr |
| QB | 3 | Clayton Tune | Jr |
| WR | 5 | Marquez Stevenson | Sr |
| QB | 6 | Logan Holgorsen | So |
| QB | 10 | Sofian Massoud | Fr |
| WR | 12 | Ke'Andre Street | Fr |
| WR | 13 | Jeremy Singleton | Jr |
| QB | 14 | Ike Ogbogu | Jr |
| RB | 18 | Chandler Smith | Sr |
| WR | 19 | Julon Williams | So |
| RB | 22 | Kyle Porter | Sr |
| RB | 23 | James Fullbright III | Fr |
| WR | 24 | Jaylen Davis | Fr |
| WR | 26 | Ja'Kori Morgan | So |
| WR | 31 | Jordan Cooper | So |
| RB | 34 | Mulbah Car | Sr |
| RB | 37 | Terrell Brown | Fr |
| WR | 39 | Andrew Segovia | Sr |
| RB | 40 | Kelan Walker | So |
| TE | 43 | DeKalen Goodson | So |
| OL | 52 | Braylon Jones | Sr |
| OL | 62 | Jarrid Williams | Sr |
| OL | 63 | James Faminu | Fr |
| OL | 64 | Dennis Bardwell | Sr |
| OL | 65 | Gio Pancotti | Sr |
| OL | 67 | Cam'Ron Johnson | Fr |
| OL | 70 | Jordan Boatman | Jr |
| OL | 71 | Max Banes | So |
| OL | 73 | Kameron Lewis | So |
| OL | 75 | Jack Freeman | So |
| OL | 76 | Patrick Paul | Fr |
| OL | 77 | Keenan Murphy | Sr |
| OL | 79 | Chayse Todd | Fr |
| WR | 80 | Nathaniel Dell | Fr |
| WR | 81 | Tre'Von Bradley | Jr |
| WR | 83 | Peyton Sawyer | So |
| WR | 84 | Cole McGowan | Sr |
| TE | 85 | Christian Trahan | Jr |
| TE | 88 | Shane Creamer | Jr |
| TE | 89 | Parker Eichenberger | So |

Defense

| Pos. | # | Name | Class |
|---|---|---|---|
| S | 2 | Deontay Anderson | Sr |
| S | 3 | Grant Stuard | Sr |
| CB | 6 | Damarion Williams | Sr |
| S | 9 | Jovanni Stewart | Sr |
| DL | 12 | David Anenih | Sr |
| CB | 13 | Marcus Jones | Jr |
| LB | 14 | Ronald Nunnery | Fr |
| LB | 15 | Zamar Kirven | Jr |
| CB | 16 | Jayce Rogers | Jr |
| S | 17 | Hasaan Hypolite | So |
| CB | 18 | Kelvin Clemmons | Jr |
| CB | 19 | Javian Smith | Jr |
| LB | 20 | Jordan Moore | So |
| S | 21 | Gleson Sprewell | Jr |
| DL | 23 | Willie Smith III | So |
| LB | 24 | Donavan Mutin | Jr |
| CB | 25 | D. J. Small | Jr |
| LB | 26 | Elijah Gooden | Jr |
| LB | 27 | Amaud Willis-Dalton | Jr |
| S | 28 | Thabo Mwaniki | Jr |
| CB | 29 | Colin Samuel | Sr |
| DL | 30 | Alexander Duke | Jr |
| DL | 31 | Derek Parish | Jr |
| S | 32 | Gervarrius Owens | Jr |
| S | 33 | Garrison Vaughn | So |
| CB | 34 | Dylan Dixon | Fr |
| S | 37 | Deondre Dansby | Fr |
| CB | 39 | Shaun Lewis | Jr |
| S | 40 | Brody Anderson | So |
| LB | 42 | Terrance Edgeston | Sr |
| LB | 45 | Malik Robinson | Jr |
| DL | 47 | Taures Payne | Sr |
| LB | 48 | Jordan Carmouche | Jr |
| DL | 50 | Hakeem Ajijolaiya | Fr |
| LB | 52 | Ken Savanah | Fr |
| LB | 59 | Jacob Daulong | Jr |
| DL | 91 | Benil Johnson | So |
| DL | 92 | Logan Hall | Jr |
| DL | 93 | Atlias Bell | Jr |
| DL | 94 | Sedrick Williams | Jr |
| DL | 95 | Jamykal Neal | Jr |
| DL | 96 | Nelson Ceaser | Fr |
| DL | 98 | Payton Turner | Sr |
| DL | 99 | Olivier Charles–Pierre | Sr |

Special teams

| Pos. | # | Name | Class |
|---|---|---|---|
| P | 22 | Laine Wilkins | Fr |
| LS | 45 | Spencer Wells | So |
| LS | 46 | Davis Beal | Fr |
| K | 47 | Dalton Witherspoon | Sr |
| K | 51 | Kyle Ramsey | So |

Head coach

- Dana Holgorsen (Iowa Wesleyan)

Coordinators/assistant coaches

- Shannon Dawson (Wingate College)
  Co-offensive coordinator/quarterbacks
- Brandon Jones (Texas Tech)
  Co-offensive coordinator/offensive line
- Joe Cauthen (Stephen F. Austin)
  Defensive coordinator/linebackers
- Doug Belk (Carson–Newman)
  Co-defensive coordinator/safeties
- Mark Scott (Hillsdale College)
  Special teams coordinator
- Tyron Carrier (Houston)
  Wide receivers
- Corby Meekins
  Tight ends/inside Receivers
- Brian Early (Arkansas–Monticello)
  Defensive line
- Zac Etheridge (Auburn)
  Cornerbacks
- Marquel Blackwell (South Florida)
  Running backs
- Mike Burchett (Kentucky)
  Offensive Football Analyst
- Will Weaver (Valdosta State)
  Defensive Football Analyst

Legend

- (C) Team captain
- (S) Suspended
- (I) Ineligible
- Injured
- Redshirt

Roster
Last update: May 23, 2020

== Schedule ==
The 2020 Houston schedule, as originally released, was to consist of six home and four away games in the regular season. The Cougars were to play host to conference foes Tulane, UCF, South Florida, and Tulsa, and to travel to conference opponents Memphis, Navy, Cincinnati, and SMU.

The Cougars were scheduled to host two non-conference games, against North Texas (C-USA) and BYU (an FBS Independent). The home game against Rice was postponed on August 10, after Rice announced it was delaying the start of the season until September 26.

Houston had a game scheduled against Washington State, which was canceled due to the COVID-19 pandemic.

On September 12 the American announced that the Houston/Memphis game scheduled for September 18 was postponed due to positive COVID-19 cases at Memphis, As a result of the Houston at Memphis game postponement, Houston was able to add a game at Baylor scheduled for September 19. On September 18, Baylor announced that the Houston versus Baylor game would be postponed due to Baylor not meeting the Big 12 Conference COVID-19 game cancellation thresholds.

After experiencing several COVID-19 cases through September 23, the North Texas Mean Green canceled the September 26 game against the Cougars.

| Date | Time | Opponent | Site | TV | Result | Attendance |
|---|---|---|---|---|---|---|
| October 8 | 6:30 p.m. | Tulane | TDECU Stadium; Houston, TX | ESPN | W 49–31 | 8,164 |
| October 16 | 8:40 p.m. | No. 14 BYU* | TDECU Stadium; Houston, TX | ESPN | L 26–43 | 10,092 |
| October 24 | 2:30 p.m. | at Navy | Navy–Marine Corps Memorial Stadium; Annapolis, MD | CBSSN | W 37–21 | 3,600 |
| October 31 | 1:00 p.m. | UCF | TDECU Stadium; Houston, TX | ESPN+ | L 21–44 | 8,630 |
| November 7 | 2:30 p.m. | at No. 6 Cincinnati | Nippert Stadium; Cincinnati, OH | ABC | L 10–38 | 0 |
| November 14 | 2:30 p.m. | South Florida | TDECU Stadium; Houston, TX | ESPN2 | W 56–21 | 8,266 |
| December 12 | 11:00 a.m. | at Memphis | Liberty Bowl Memorial Stadium; Memphis, TN | ESPN+ | L 27–30 | 9,475 |
| December 24 | 2:30 p.m. | vs. Hawaii* | Toyota Stadium; Frisco, TX (New Mexico Bowl) | ESPN | L 14–28 | 2,060 |
*Non-conference game; Rankings from AP Poll and CFP Rankings after November 24 released prior to game; All times are in Central time

Schedule source:

== Game summaries ==
=== Tulane ===
Tulane at Houston

| Team | 1 | 2 | 3 | 4 | Total |
|---|---|---|---|---|---|
| Green Wave | 17 | 7 | 7 | 0 | 31 |
| • Cougars | 7 | 14 | 21 | 7 | 49 |

- Date: October 8, 2020
- Location: TDECU Stadium
  Houston, TX
- Game start: 6:30 p.m. CDT
- Elapsed time: 3 hours and 58 minutes
- Game attendance: 8,164
- Game weather: 78 °F (26 °C) • Weather: Cloudy, Humid • Wind: NE 10 MPH
- Referee: Edwin Lee
- TV announcers (ESPN): Bob Wischusen (play–by–play), Mike Golic Jr. (analyst), and Kris Budden (sideline reporter)

Scoring summary
| 1 | 13:42 | TULN | Macon Clark 64-yard interception returned (Merek Glover kick) (5 plays, 36 yards, 1:18) | TULN 7–0 |
| 1 | 11:07 | HOU | Mulbah Car 5-yard rush (Dalton Witherspoon kick) (6 plays, 75 yards, 2:35) | TIE 7–7 |
| 1 | 09:23 | TULN | Jeffrey Johnson 1-yard fumble returned (Merek Glover kick) (2 plays, −13 yards, 0:38) | TULN 14–7 |
| 1 | 03:50 | TULN | Merek Glover 39-yard field goal (10 plays, 36 yards, 4:43) | TULN 17–7 |
| 2 | 13:50 | TULN | Michael Pratt 1-yard rush (Merek Glover kick) (9 plays, 50 yards, 4:26) | TULN 24–7 |
| 2 | 09:47 | HOU | Clayton Tune 1-yard rush (Dalton Witherspoon kick) (10 plays, 75 yards, 4:03) | TULN 24–14 |
| 2 | 03:53 | HOU | Ke'Andre Street 23-yard pass from Clayton Tune (Dalton Witherspoon kick) (11 plays, 68 yards, 3:48) | TULN 24–21 |
| 3 | 07:53 | HOU | Mulbah Car 3-yard rush (Dalton Witherspoon kick) (10 plays, 57 yards, 5:09) | HOU 24–28 |
| 3 | 05:53 | TULN | Jha'Quan Jackson 8-yard pass from Michael Pratt (Merek Glover kick) (6 plays, 75 yards, 2:00) | TULN 31–28 |
| 3 | 05:36 | HOU | Marquez Stevenson 97-yard kickoff returned (Dalton Witherspoon kick) (0 plays, 0 yards, 0:00) | HOU 31–35 |
| 3 | 00:46 | HOU | Kyle Porter 1-yard rush (Dalton Witherspoon kick) (8 plays, 60 yards, 3:21) | HOU 31–42 |
| 4 | 14:03 | HOU | Marquez Stevenson 41-yard pass from Clayton Tune (Dalton Witherspoon kick) (2 plays, 43 yards, 0:38) | HOU 31–49 |

| Statistics | Tulane | Houston |
|---|---|---|
| First downs | 16 | 22 |
| Total yards | 211 | 476 |
| Rushing yards | 70 | 157 |
| Passing yards | 141 | 319 |
| Turnovers | 0 | 5 |
| Time of possession | 28:47 | 31:13 |

| Team | Category | Player | Statistics |
|---|---|---|---|
| Tulane | Passing | Michael Pratt | 11/25, 141 yards, 1 TD |
| Tulane | Rushing | Cameron Carroll | 18 carries, 34 yards |
| Tulane | Receiving | Duece Watts | 2 receptions, 50 yards |
| Houston | Passing | Clayton Tune | 20/33, 319 yards, 2 TDs, 2 INTs |
| Houston | Rushing | Kyle Porter | 11 carries, 57 yards, 1 TD |
| Houston | Receiving | Marquez Stevenson | 5 receptions, 118 yards, 1 TD |

=== BYU ===
Brigham Young at Houston

| Team | 1 | 2 | 3 | 4 | Total |
|---|---|---|---|---|---|
| • No. 14 BYU Cougars | 14 | 0 | 7 | 22 | 43 |
| HOU Cougars | 3 | 17 | 6 | 0 | 26 |

- Date: October 16, 2020
- Location: TDECU Stadium
  Houston, TX
- Game start: 8:40 p.m. CDT
- Elapsed time: 3 hours and 43 minutes
- Game attendance: 10,092
- Game weather: 58 °F (14 °C) • Weather: Mostly Cloudy • Wind: E 3 MPH
- Referee: Kevin Mar
- TV announcers (ESPN): Jason Benetti (play–by–play), Andre Ware (analyst), and Kris Budden (sideline reporter)

Scoring summary
| 1 | 09:53 | HOU | Dalton Witherspoon 27-yard field goal (10 plays, 65 yards, 5:07) | HOU 3–0 |
| 1 | 09:34 | BYU | Dax Milne 78-yard pass from Zach Wilson (Jake Oldroyd kick) (1 play, 78 yards, 0:19) | BYU 7–3 |
| 1 | 04:42 | BYU | Lopini Katoa 1-yard rush (Jake Oldroyd kick) (7 plays, 85 yards, 3:23) | BYU 14–3 |
| 2 | 09:01 | HOU | Christian Trahan 20-yard pass from Clayton Tune (Dalton Witherspoon kick) (8 plays, 91 yards, 4:01) | BYU 14–10 |
| 2 | 04:42 | HOU | Nathaniel Dell 5-yard pass from Clayton Tune (Dalton Witherspoon kick) (7 plays, 61 yards, 3:22) | HOU 17–14 |
| 2 | 00:00 | HOU | Dalton Witherspoon 49-yard field goal (9 plays, 65 yards, 1:12) | HOU 20–14 |
| 3 | 03:05 | HOU | Clayton Tune 5-yard rush (two-point pass conversion attempt failed) (16 plays, 98 yards, 6:48) | HOU 26–14 |
| 3 | 00:53 | BYU | Dax Milne 2-yard pass from Zach Wilson (Jake Oldroyd kick) (5 plays, 75 yards, 2:12) | HOU 26–21 |
| 4 | 10:35 | BYU | Masen Wake 8-yard pass from Zach Wilson (Zach Wilson two-point conversion pass to Tyler Allgeier) (3 plays, 23 yards, 1:15) | BYU 29–26 |
| 4 | 03:06 | BYU | Dax Milne 18-yard pass from Zach Wilson (Jake Oldroyd kick) (6 plays, 57 yards, 1:37) | BYU 36–26 |
| 4 | 01:40 | BYU | Tyler Allgeier 14-yard rush (Jake Oldroyd kick) (2 plays, 17 yards, 0:13) | BYU 43–26 |

| Statistics | BYU | Houston |
|---|---|---|
| First downs | 23 | 28 |
| Total yards | 478 | 438 |
| Rushing yards | 78 | 128 |
| Passing yards | 400 | 310 |
| Turnovers | 0 | 0 |
| Time of possession | 25:48 | 34:12 |

| Team | Category | Player | Statistics |
|---|---|---|---|
| BYU | Passing | Zach Wilson | 25/35, 400 yards, 4 TDs |
| BYU | Rushing | Zach Wilson | 9 carries, 40 yards |
| BYU | Receiving | Dax Milne | 9 receptions, 184 yards, 3 TDs |
| Houston | Passing | Clayton Tune | 21/31, 310 yards, 2 TDs |
| Houston | Rushing | Kyle Porter | 20 carries, 94 yards |
| Houston | Receiving | Christian Trahan | 3 receptions, 69 yards, 1 TD |

=== At Navy ===
Houston at Navy

| Team | 1 | 2 | 3 | 4 | Total |
|---|---|---|---|---|---|
| • Cougars | 3 | 13 | 7 | 14 | 37 |
| Midshipmen | 7 | 6 | 0 | 8 | 21 |

- Date: October 24, 2020
- Location: Navy–Marine Corps Memorial Stadium
  Annapolis, MD
- Game start: 3:32 p.m. CDT
- Elapsed time: 3 hours and 32 minutes
- Game attendance: 3,600
- Game weather: 74 °F (23 °C) • Weather: Sunny, Few Clouds • Wind: NW 7 MPH
- Referee: Hank Johns
- TV announcers (ESPN2): Roy Philpott (play–by–play), Kelly Stouffer (analyst), and Eric Wood (sideline reporter)

Scoring summary
| 1 | 06:04 | HOU | Dalton Witherspoon 33-yard field goal (13 plays, 33 yards, 4:31) | HOU 3–0 |
| 1 | 00:08 | NAVY | Dalen Morris 6-yard rush (Bijan Nichols kick) (11 plays, 75 yards, 5:56) | NAVY 7–3 |
| 2 | 10:47 | HOU | Dalton Witherspoon 53-yard field goal (11 plays, 39 yards, 4:21) | NAVY 7–6 |
| 2 | 06:37 | HOU | Dalton Witherspoon 45-yard field goal (5 plays, 22 yards, 2:39) | HOU 9–7 |
| 2 | 04:02 | NAVY | Ryan Mitchell 60-yard pass from Dalen Morris (Bijan Nichols PAT blocked) (6 plays, 75 yards, 2:35) | NAVY 13–9 |
| 2 | 01:53 | HOU | Marquez Stevenson 51-yard pass from Clayton Tune (Dalton Witherspoon kick) (3 plays, 79 yards, 0:44) | HOU 16–13 |
| 3 | 06:32 | HOU | Kyle Porter 1-yard rush (Dalton Witherspoon kick) (5 plays, 20 yards, 2:27) | HOU 23–13 |
| 4 | 14:06 | HOU | Kyle Porter 33-yard pass from Clayton Tune (Dalton Witherspoon kick) (10 plays, 77 yards, 3:46) | HOU 30–13 |
| 4 | 05:24 | HOU | Marquez Stevenson 24-yard pass from Clayton Tune (Dalton Witherspoon kick) (12 plays, 80 yards, 5:08) | HOU 37–13 |
| 4 | 01:07 | NAVY | CJ Williams 5-yard pass from Dalen Morris (Dalen Morris two-point conversion rush) (14 plays, 75 yards, 4:17) | HOU 37–21 |

| Statistics | Houston | Navy |
|---|---|---|
| First downs | 23 | 16 |
| Total yards | 420 | 372 |
| Rushing yards | 86 | 166 |
| Passing yards | 334 | 206 |
| Turnovers | 1 | 1 |
| Time of possession | 29:11 | 30:49 |

| Team | Category | Player | Statistics |
|---|---|---|---|
| Houston | Passing | Clayton Tune | 24/34, 316 yards, 3 TDs |
| Houston | Rushing | Kyle Porter | 21 carries, 52 yards, 1 TD |
| Houston | Receiving | Marquez Stevenson | 9 receptions, 129 yards, 2 TDs |
| Navy | Passing | Dalen Morris | 10/18, 206 yards, 2 TDs, 1 INT |
| Navy | Rushing | Nelson Smith | 11 carries, 51 yards |
| Navy | Receiving | Ryan Mitchell | 2 receptions, 94 yards, 1 TD |

=== UCF ===
Central Florida at Houston

| Team | 1 | 2 | 3 | 4 | Total |
|---|---|---|---|---|---|
| • Knights | 10 | 13 | 0 | 21 | 44 |
| Cougars | 7 | 0 | 6 | 8 | 21 |

- Date: October 31, 2020
- Location: TDECU Stadium
  Houston, TX
- Game start: 1:05 p.m. CDT
- Elapsed time: 3 hours and 39 minutes
- Game attendance: 8,630
- Game weather: 72 °F (22 °C) • Weather: Sunny • Wind: SW 3 MPH
- Referee: Luke Richmond
- TV announcers (ESPN+): David Saltzman (play–by–play) and Stanford Routt (analyst)

Scoring summary
| 1 | 07:59 | UCF | Daniel Obarski 31-yard field goal (9 plays, 63 yards, 2:55) | UCF 3–0 |
| 1 | 04:03 | HOU | Grant Stuard 34-yard fumble returned (Dalton Witherspoon kick) (5 plays, 14 yards, 1:25) | HOU 7–3 |
| 1 | 02:15 | UCF | Ryan O'Keefe 34-yard pass from Dillon Gabriel (Daniel Obarski kick) (4 plays, 78 yards, 1:48) | UCF 10–7 |
| 2 | 10:59 | UCF | Bentavious Thompson 1-yard rush (Daniel Obarski kick) (7 plays, 70 yards, 1:40) | UCF 17–7 |
| 2 | 05:20 | UCF | Daniel Obarski 24-yard field goal (13 plays, 89 yards, 3:46) | UCF 20–7 |
| 2 | 00:19 | UCF | Daniel Obarski 38-yard field goal (9 plays, 59 yards, 1:19) | UCF 23–7 |
| 3 | 06:16 | HOU | Kyle Porter 1-yard rush (two-point conversion pass attempt failed) (11 plays, 85 yards, 3:20) | UCF 23–13 |
| 4 | 14:38 | UCF | Ryan O'Keefe 36-yard pass from Dillon Gabriel (Daniel Obarski kick) (6 plays, 58 yards, 1:40) | UCF 30–13 |
| 4 | 07:03 | UCF | Greg McCrae 1-yard rush (Daniel Obarski kick) (9 plays, 75 yards, 4:02) | UCF 37–13 |
| 4 | 04:17 | HOU | Nathaniel Dell 10-yard pass from Clayton Tune (Clayton Tune two-point conversion pass to Chandler Smith) (8 plays, 82 yards, 2:46) | UCF 37–21 |
| 4 | 01:36 | UCF | Otis Anderson 28-yard rush (Daniel Obarski kick) (6 plays, 47 yards, 2:41) | UCF 44–21 |

| Statistics | UCF | Houston |
|---|---|---|
| First downs | 32 | 26 |
| Total yards | 681 | 434 |
| Rushing yards | 353 | 165 |
| Passing yards | 328 | 269 |
| Turnovers | 1 | 2 |
| Time of possession | 27:19 | 32:41 |

| Team | Category | Player | Statistics |
|---|---|---|---|
| UCF | Passing | Dillon Gabriel | 19/33, 328 yards, 2 TDs |
| UCF | Rushing | Otis Anderson Jr. | 16 carries, 170 yards, 1 TD |
| UCF | Receiving | Jaylon Robinson | 5 receptions, 107 yards |
| Houston | Passing | Clayton Tune | 21/41, 263 yards, 1 TD, 2 INTs |
| Houston | Rushing | Kyle Porter | 13 carries, 52 yards, 1 TD |
| Houston | Receiving | Nathaniel Dell | 6 receptions, 88 yards, 1 TD |

=== At Cincinnati ===
Houston at Cincinnati

| Team | 1 | 2 | 3 | 4 | Total |
|---|---|---|---|---|---|
| Cougars | 0 | 10 | 0 | 0 | 10 |
| • No. 6 Bearcats | 7 | 21 | 3 | 7 | 38 |

- Date: November 7, 2020
- Location: Nippert Stadium
  Cincinnati, OH
- Game start: 2:41 p.m. CST
- Elapsed time: 3 hours and 16 minutes
- Game attendance: 0
- Game weather: 73 °F (23 °C) • Weather: Sunny • Wind: S 3 MPH
- Referee: Edwin Lee
- TV announcers (ABC): Sean McDonough (play–by–play), Todd Blackledge (analyst), Todd McShay (analyst), and Molly McGrath (sideline reporter)

Scoring summary
| 1 | 08:51 | CIN | Gerrid Doaks 2-yard rush (Cole Smith kick) (5 plays, 84 yards, 2:20) | CIN 0–7 |
| 2 | 07:53 | CIN | Desmond Ridder 10-yard rush (Cole Smith kick) (10 plays, 75 yards, 3:06) | CIN 0–14 |
| 2 | 04:17 | HOU | Kyle Porter 3-yard rush (Dalton Witherspoon kick) (8 plays, 65 yards, 3:29) | CIN 7–14 |
| 2 | 01:40 | CIN | Desmond Ridder 32-yard rush (Cole Smith kick) (6 plays, 75 yards, 2:37) | CIN 7–21 |
| 2 | 00:38 | HOU | Dalton Witherspoon 27-yard field goal (5 plays, 55 yards, 1:02) | CIN 10–21 |
| 2 | 00:13 | CIN | Josh Whyle 21-yard pass from Desmond Ridder (Cole Smith kick) (3 plays, 55 yards, 0:28) | CIN 10–28 |
| 3 | 05:48 | CIN | Cole Smith 32-yard field goal (17 plays, 60 yards, 9:12) | CIN 10–31 |
| 4 | 14:15 | CIN | Desmond Ridder 12-yard rush (Cole Smith kick) (10 plays, 85 yards, 3:09) | CIN 10–38 |

| Statistics | Houston | Cincinnati |
|---|---|---|
| First downs | 15 | 24 |
| Total yards | 282 | 510 |
| Rushing yards | 93 | 342 |
| Passing yards | 189 | 168 |
| Turnovers | 2 | 1 |
| Time of possession | 27:31 | 32:29 |

| Team | Category | Player | Statistics |
|---|---|---|---|
| Houston | Passing | Clayton Tune | 20/34, 189 yards, 1 INT |
| Houston | Rushing | Kyle Porter | 16 carries, 69 yards, 1 TD |
| Houston | Receiving | Nathaniel Dell | 3 receptions, 60 yards |
| Cincinnati | Passing | Desmond Ridder | 17/27, 162 yards, 1 TD, 1 INT |
| Cincinnati | Rushing | Gerrid Doaks | 16 carries, 184 yards, 1 TD |
| Cincinnati | Receiving | Michael Young Jr. | 4 receptions, 47 yards |

=== South Florida ===
South Florida at Houston

| Team | 1 | 2 | 3 | 4 | Total |
|---|---|---|---|---|---|
| Bulls | 0 | 0 | 7 | 14 | 21 |
| • Cougars | 14 | 14 | 14 | 14 | 56 |

- Date: November 14, 2020
- Location: TDECU Stadium
  Houston, TX
- Game start: 2:35 p.m. CST
- Elapsed time: 3 hours and 22 minutes
- Game attendance: 8,266
- Game weather: 83 °F (28 °C) • Weather: Partly Cloudy • Wind: S 10 MPH
- Referee: Charles Lamertina
- TV announcers (ESPN2/ESPN+): David Saltzman (play–by–play) and Stanford Routt (analyst)

Scoring summary
| 1 | 14:04 | HOU | Bryson Smith 28-yard pass from Clayton Tune (Kyle Ramsey kick) (3 plays, 75 yards, 0:56) | HOU 7–0 |
| 1 | 02:05 | HOU | Clayton Tune 26-yard rush (Kyle Ramsey kick) (6 plays, 80 yards, 3:05) | HOU 14–0 |
| 2 | 10:06 | HOU | Clayton Tune 13-yard rush (Kyle Ramsey kick) (6 plays, 56 yards, 2:19) | HOU 21–0 |
| 2 | 07:16 | HOU | Keith Corbin 33-yard pass from Clayton Tune (Kyle Ramsey kick) (3 plays, 53 yards, 1:05) | HOU 28–0 |
| 3 | 13:51 | HOU | Marcus Jones 72-yard punt returned (Kyle Ramsey kick) (3 plays, 4 yards, 1:09) | HOU 35–0 |
| 3 | 06:07 | HOU | Derek Parish 85-yard fumble returned (Kyle Ramsey kick) (10 plays, 49 yards, 3:59) | HOU 42–0 |
| 3 | 03:37 | USF | Leonard Parker 2-yard rush (Spencer Shrader kick) (6 plays, 75 yards, 2:30) | HOU 42–7 |
| 4 | 11:50 | USF | Omarion Dollison 2-yard pass from Jordan McCloud (Spencer Shrader kick) (11 plays, 83 yards, 4:25) | HOU 42–14 |
| 4 | 10:22 | USF | Bentlee Sanders 38-yard interception returned (Spencer Shrader kick) (3 plays, 9 yards, 1:28) | HOU 42–21 |
| 4 | 05:35 | HOU | Christian Trahan 6-yard pass from Clayton Tune (Kyle Ramsey kick) (7 plays, 75 yards, 5:00) | HOU 49–21 |
| 4 | 05:15 | HOU | James Fullbright III 14-yard rush (Kyle Ramsey kick) (1 play, 14 yards, 0:07) | HOU 56–21 |

| Statistics | South Florida | Houston |
|---|---|---|
| First downs | 23 | 25 |
| Total yards | 359 | 505 |
| Rushing yards | 136 | 319 |
| Passing yards | 223 | 186 |
| Turnovers | 2 | 1 |
| Time of possession | 31:01 | 28:59 |

| Team | Category | Player | Statistics |
|---|---|---|---|
| South Florida | Passing | Jordan McCloud | 14–29, 180 yards, 1TD |
| South Florida | Rushing | Brian Battie | 13 carries, 86 yards |
| South Florida | Receiving | Bryce Miller | 5 receptions, 53 yards |
| Houston | Passing | Clayton Tune | 14–25, 165 yards, 3 TDs, 1 INT |
| Houston | Rushing | Clayton Tune | 10 carries, 120 yards, 2TDs |
| Houston | Receiving | Keith Corbin | 4 receptions, 67 yards, 1 TD |

=== At Memphis ===
Houston at Memphis

| Team | 1 | 2 | 3 | 4 | Total |
|---|---|---|---|---|---|
| Cougars | 3 | 3 | 0 | 21 | 27 |
| • Tigers | 3 | 14 | 10 | 3 | 30 |

- Date: December 12, 2020
- Location: Liberty Bowl Memorial Stadium
  Memphis, TN
- Game start: 2:45 p.m. CST
- Elapsed time: 3 hours and 25 minutes
- Game attendance: 9,475
- Game weather: 57 °F (14 °C) • Weather: Clear • Wind: W 11 MPH
- Referee: Hank Johns
- TV announcers (ESPN2/ESPN+): David Saltzman (play–by–play) and Keith Moreland (analyst)

Scoring summary
| 1 | 07:57 | HOU | Dalton Witherspoon 28-yard field goal (15 plays, 64 yards, 7:03) | HOU 3–0 |
| 1 | 00:22 | MEM | Riley Patterson 34-yard field goal (14 plays, 56 yards, 4:59) | TIE 3–3 |
| 2 | 08:14 | HOU | Dalton Witherspoon 29-yard field goal (10 plays, 60 yards, 4:32) | HOU 6–3 |
| 2 | 05:21 | MEM | Tahj Washington 4-yard pass from Brady White (Riley Patterson kick) (8 plays, 75 yards, 2:53) | MEM 10–6 |
| 2 | 00:31 | MEM | Jaylon Allen 85-yard fumble return (Riley Patterson kick) (8 plays, 45 yards, 3:16) | MEM 17–6 |
| 3 | 11:46 | MEM | Calvin Austin III 15-yard pass from Brady White (Riley Patterson kick) (9 plays, 75 yards, 3:14) | MEM 24–6 |
| 3 | 02:15 | MEM | Riley Patterson 49-yard field goal (12 plays, 55 yards, 6:30) | MEM 27–6 |
| 4 | 13:01 | HOU | Marquez Stevenson 13-yard pass from Clayton Tune (Dalton Witherspoon kick) (11 plays, 75 yards, 4:09) | MEM 27–13 |
| 4 | 08:07 | HOU | Clayton Tune 19-yard rush (Dalton Witherspoon kick) (6 plays, 40 yards, 1:33) | MEM 27–20 |
| 4 | 00:28 | HOU | Bryson Smith 18-yard pass from Clayton Tune (Dalton Witherspoon kick) (15 plays, 70 yards, 4:46) | TIE 27–27 |
| 4 | 00:00 | MEM | Riley Patterson 47-yard field goal (5 plays, 46 yards, 0:28) | MEM 30–27 |

| Statistics | Houston | Memphis |
|---|---|---|
| First downs | 26 | 20 |
| Total yards | 409 | 310 |
| Rushing yards | 139 | 64 |
| Passing yards | 270 | 246 |
| Turnovers | 2 | 1 |
| Time of possession | 33:29 | 26:31 |

| Team | Category | Player | Statistics |
|---|---|---|---|
| Houston | Passing | Clayton Tune | 30/49, 270 yards, 2 TDs, 1 INT |
| Houston | Rushing | Kyle Porter | 15 carries, 70 yards |
| Houston | Receiving | Christian Trahan | 5 receptions, 84 yards |
| Memphis | Passing | Brady White | 22/35, 246 yards, 2 TDs, 1 INT |
| Memphis | Rushing | Asa Martin | 11 carries, 27 yards |
| Memphis | Receiving | Calvin Austin | 7 receptions, 74 yards, 1 TD |

=== Vs. Hawaii (New Mexico Bowl) ===
2020 New Mexico Bowl

| Team | 1 | 2 | 3 | 4 | Total |
|---|---|---|---|---|---|
| • Rainbow Warriors | 14 | 7 | 7 | 0 | 28 |
| Cougars | 0 | 0 | 14 | 0 | 14 |

- Date: December 24, 2020
- Location: Toyota Stadium
  Frisco, TX
- Game start: 2:34 p.m. CST
- Elapsed time: 3 hours and 23 minutes
- Game attendance: 2,060
- Game weather: 50 °F (10 °C) • Weather: Sunny • Wind: WNW 8 MPH
- Referee: Chris Bynum
- TV announcers (ESPN/ESPN Radio/ESPN Deportes): John Schriffen (play–by–play), Rene Ingoglia (analyst), and Kris Budden (sideline reporter)/Kevin Winter (play-by-play) and Craig Haubert (analyst)/Javier Trejo Garay (play-by-play) and Jose Mondragon (analyst)

Scoring summary
| 1 | 10:43 | HAW | Dae Dae Hunter 3-yard pass from Chevan Cordeiro (Matthew Shipley kick) (2 plays,8 yards, 0:35) | HAW 7–0 |
| 1 | 03:35 | HAW | Calvin Turner 75-yard pass from Chevan Cordeiro (Matthew Shipley kick) (1 play, 75 yards, 0:12) | HAW 14–0 |
| 2 | 08:05 | HAW | Jonah Laulu 4-yard pass from Chevan Cordeiro (Matthew Shipley kick) (7 plays, 80 yards, 3:17) | HAW 21–0 |
| 3 | 07:39 | HOU | Nathaniel Dell 7-yard pass from Clayton Tune (Dalton Witherspoon kick) (17 plays, 75 yards, 7:21) | HAW 21–7 |
| 3 | 03:45 | HOU | Christian Trahan 26-yard pass from Clayton Tune (Dalton Witherspoon kick) (5 plays, 83 yards, 2:03) | HAW 21–14 |
| 3 | 03:29 | HAW | Calvin Turner 92-yard kickoff returned (Matthew Shipley kick) (0 plays, 0 yards, 0:16) | HAW 28–14 |

| Statistics | Hawaii | Houston |
|---|---|---|
| First downs | 11 | 20 |
| Total yards | 267 | 307 |
| Rushing yards | 131 | 58 |
| Passing yards | 136 | 249 |
| Turnovers | 0 | 3 |
| Time of possession | 26:56 | 33:04 |

| Team | Category | Player | Statistics |
|---|---|---|---|
| Hawaii | Passing | Chevan Cordeiro | 15/23, 136 yards, 3 TDs |
| Hawaii | Rushing | Dae Dae Hunter | 12 carries, 44 yards |
| Hawaii | Receiving | Jared Smart | 3 receptions, 33 yards |
| Houston | Passing | Clayton Tune | 20/38, 216 yards, 2 TDs, 3 INTs |
| Houston | Rushing | Mulbah Car | 15 carries, 47 yards |
| Houston | Receiving | Nathaniel Dell | 6 receptions, 112 yards, 1 TD |

== Rankings ==
Ranking movements Legend: ██ Increase in ranking ██ Decrease in ranking — = Not ranked RV = Received votes
| | Week | | | | | | | | | | | | | | | |
| Poll | Pre | 1 | 2 | 3 | 4 | 5 | 6 | 7 | 8 | 9 | 10 | 11 | 12 | 13 | 14 | Final |
|---|---|---|---|---|---|---|---|---|---|---|---|---|---|---|---|---|
| AP | — | —* | RV | | | | | | | | | | | | | |
| Coaches | — | —* | — | | | | | | | | | | | | | |
| CFP | Not released | | | | | | | | | | | | | | | Not released |

== Players drafted into the NFL ==
| Round | Pick | Player | Position | NFL club |
|---|---|---|---|---|
| 1 | 28 | Payton Turner | DE | New Orleans Saints |
| 6 | 203 | Marquez Stevenson | WR | Buffalo Bills |
| 7 | 259 | Grant Stuard | LB | Tampa Bay Buccaneers |
