= Poteet High School (Mesquite, Texas) =

Public school in Texas, United States

Coordinates: 32°48′27″N 96°36′33″W

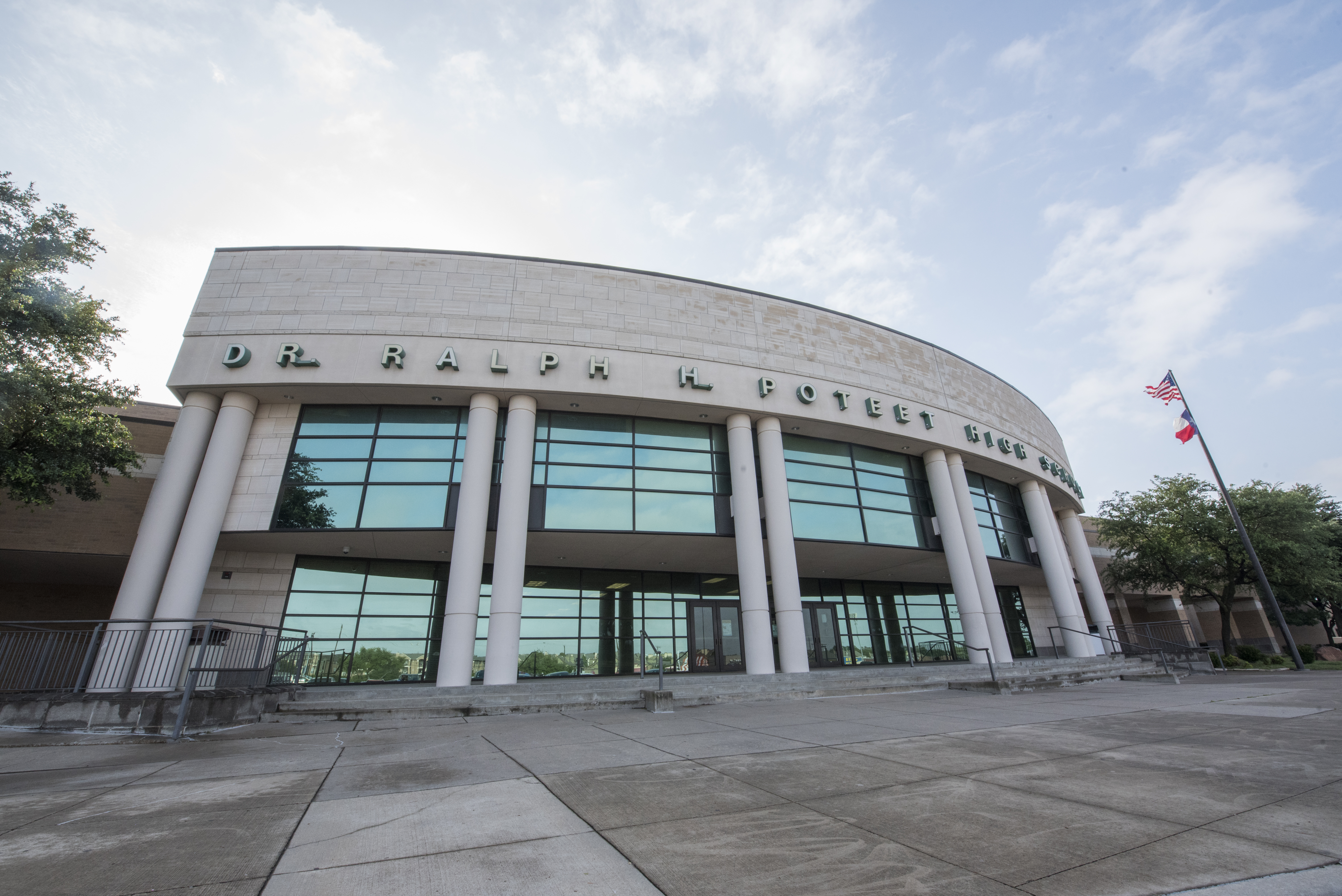
- Exterior of Poteet High School

Location
- 3300 Poteet Drive; Mesquite, Texas 75150; United States

Information
- Type: Free public
- Motto: "Respect, Honor, Pride."
- Established: 1986
- School district: Mesquite Independent School District
- Principal: Kelly Long
- Teaching staff: 109.68 (FTE)
- Grades: 9–12
- Enrollment: 1,527 (2023–2024)
- Student to teacher ratio: 13.92
- Campus type: Suburban
- Colors: Green and white
- Mascot: Pirate
- Website: poteethighschool.mesquiteisd.org

Dr. Ralph H. Poteet High School is located at 3300 Poteet Drive in Mesquite, in the U.S. state of Texas. It opened in 1986 and is named for a former school superintendent, Dr. Ralph H. Poteet. It is the fourth high school built by the Mesquite Independent School District.

Poteet serves grades 9 through 12. Poteet serves northern portions of Mesquite; the school formerly served parts of Sunnyvale. The school mascot is Patch the Pirate.

One of the things Poteet High School is known for is its band program. The Poteet Pirate Band has consistently made state finals since 1993, won the AAAA UIL State Marching Band title in 1997, 2005, and 2007, and has most recently placed 5th at AAAAA UIL State Marching Band in 2017. The Poteet Honors Band received the title of 2008 TMEA Class 4A Honor Band, the highest honor a concert band can receive in the state of Texas. The band has also received the UIL Sweepstakes Award for 22 consecutive years (every year since the school opened). The Poteet Percussion Ensemble was selected as a showcase performance in Austin at the Percussive Arts Society International Convention in November 2008. Also, in 2009, the band received the Sudler Flag of Honor, an award from the John Philip Sousa Foundation. The band also participated in its 1st BOA competition with BOA DFW in 2018.

Poteet was named a 1999-2000 National Blue Ribbon School.

== Standardized dress ==
Mesquite ISD decided to adopt standardized dress (similar to a school uniform) for middle and high school students starting with the 2005 to 2006 school year.

== AcDec achievements ==
Poteet High School has a notable United States Academic Decathlon (AcDec) team that has advanced to state finals several times.

- The 1997 Poteet AcDec Team advanced to the State Finals in San Antonio, Texas.
- The 2007 Poteet AcDec Team advanced to the State Finals in San Antonio, Texas. They were 16th out of 25 schools.
- The 2015-2016 Poteet AcDec Team advanced to the State Finals.
- The 2016-2017 Poteet AcDec Team advanced to the State Finals in El Paso.

== Notable people ==
- Skye Dawson, NFL wide receiver (attended Poteet for 2 years before finishing high school at Dallas Christian School)
- Mekhi Garner, NFL cornerback and current free agent, played at the University of Louisiana at Lafayette and LSU.
- Todd Graham, college football coach (began his coaching career as an assistant at Poteet)
- Malik Jefferson, high school Butkus Award winner and current NFL linebacker.
- Jason Jennings, major league baseball pitcher
- Cam Lampkin, NFL defensive back for the Los Angeles Rams
- Seth McGowan, NFL running back for the Indianapolis Colts
- Louis Moore, NFL safety for the Miami Dolphins
- Zach Woodlee, choreographer

== See also ==
- Poteet High School (Poteet, Texas)
