= Dana Holgorsen =

American football coach (born 1971)

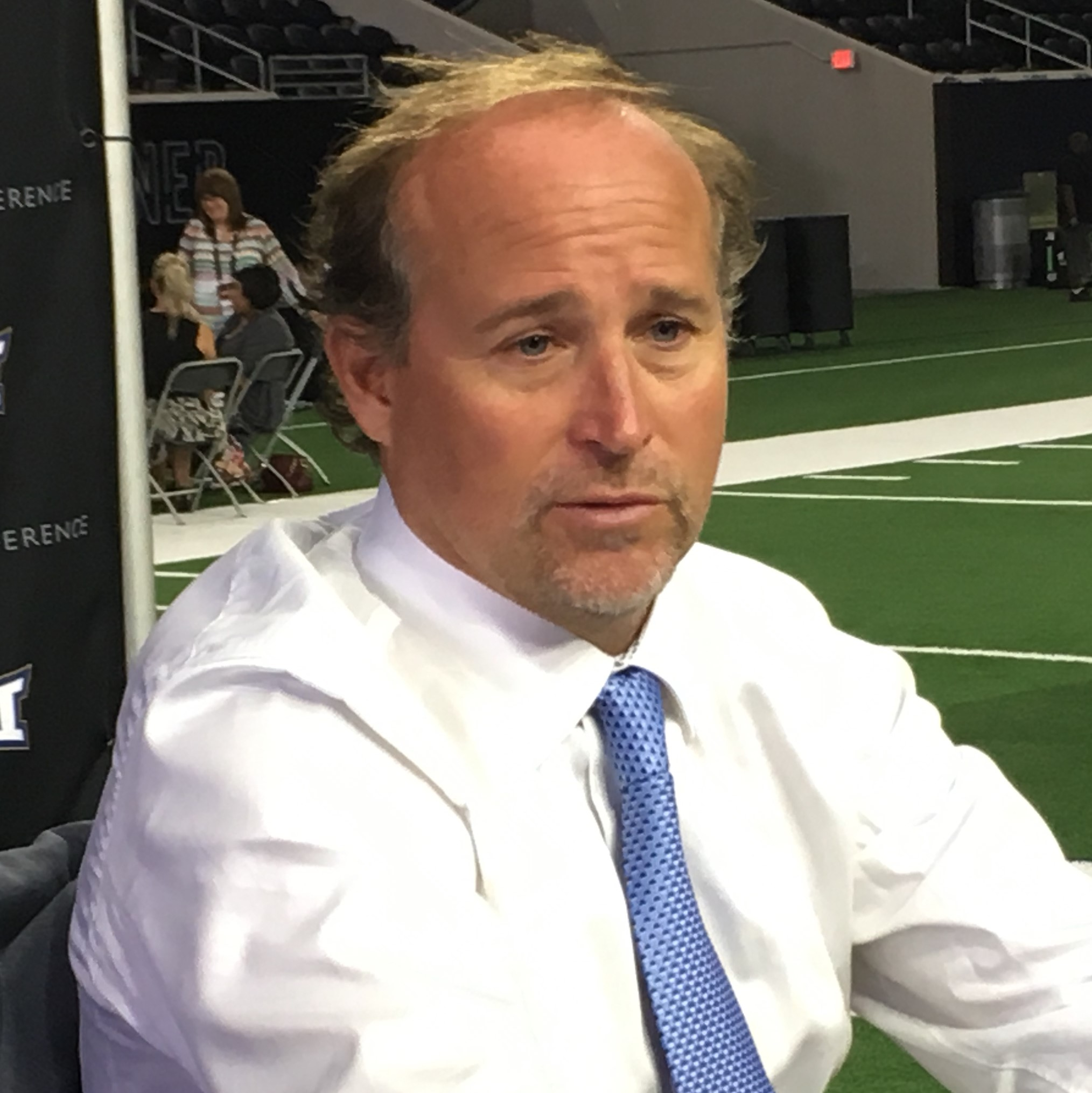
- Holgorsen with West Virginia in 2017

Biographical details
- Born: June 21, 1971 (age 55); Davenport, Iowa, U.S.

Playing career
- 1989: St. Ambrose
- 1990–1992: Iowa Wesleyan

Coaching career (HC unless noted)
- 1993–1995: Valdosta State (QB/WR/ST)
- 1996–1998: Mississippi College (QB/WR/ST)
- 1999: Wingate (QB/WR)
- 2000–2004: Texas Tech (IWR)
- 2005–2006: Texas Tech (co-OC/IWR)
- 2007: Texas Tech (OC/IWR)
- 2008–2009: Houston (OC/QB)
- 2010: Oklahoma State (OC/QB)
- 2011–2018: West Virginia
- 2019–2023: Houston
- 2024: TCU (DA)
- 2024–2026: Nebraska (OC)

Head coaching record
- Overall: 92–69
- Bowls: 4–6

Accomplishments and honors

Championships
- 1 Big East (2011)

Awards
- FWAA First-Year Coach of the Year (2011)

Dana Carl Holgorsen (born June 21, 1971) is an American college football coach. He was previously the offensive coordinator at the University of Nebraska. He served as the head football coach at West Virginia University from 2011 to 2018 and the University of Houston from 2019 to 2023. Holgorsen has worked as an assistant coach under Hal Mumme, Mike Leach, Kevin Sumlin, and Mike Gundy.

== Playing career ==
Holgorsen attended Mount Pleasant Community High School in Mount Pleasant, Iowa, graduating in 1989. He was an all-conference selection at wide receiver both his junior and senior years. As a senior, he totaled 33 receptions for 661 yards and eight touchdowns. He was nominated to the Iowa Shrine Bowl all-star south team where he had one reception for 20 yards. He was also all-conference in basketball and on the track and field team.

Holgorsen played one season at St. Ambrose University in Davenport, Iowa, where he was a contributor as a freshman. He then transferred to Iowa Wesleyan University in Mount Pleasant, where he finished his career with 145 receptions and 1,711 yards. Both mark ranked seventh all-time at the school.

== Coaching career ==
=== Early career ===
Holgorsen spent time at Valdosta State (1993–1995) as the quarterbacks, receivers, and special teams coach under head coach Hal Mumme. Holgorsen had played for Mumme at Iowa Wesleyan. He then served at Mississippi College (1996–1998) as the quarterbacks, receivers, and special teams coach and at Wingate (1999) as the quarterbacks and receivers coach.

=== Texas Tech ===
Holgorsen was a member of the coaching staff at Texas Tech from 2000 to 2007, serving as the inside receivers coach from 2000 to 2004, before being elevated to co-offensive coordinator alongside Sonny Dykes from 2005 to 2006 and offensive coordinator in 2007. The move reunited him with head coach Mike Leach, whom Holgorsen had previously coached with at Valdosta State under Hal Mumme. While there, his offenses increased the amount of yardage from 324.8 yards of total offense to 529.6, an increase of more than 200 yards per game. The Red Raiders were No. 7 nationally prior to Holgorsen becoming offensive coordinator and raised their yardage total to No. 4 in 2005, his first season directing the offense. In his two years as offensive coordinator, his squad was nationally ranked No. 8 in 2006 and No. 3 in 2007. In 2007, Texas Tech led the nation in passing (470.31), was No. 2 in total offense (529.62) and was No. 7 in scoring offense (40.9). Quarterback Graham Harrell led the nation in total offense and Biletnikoff Award winner Michael Crabtree led the nation in receptions per game and receiving yards per game. In 2006, the Red Raiders ranked No. 3 nationally in passing offense and No. 6 in total offense. Harrell once again was outstanding, finishing No. 3 nationally in total offense with 344.38 yards per game. Texas Tech led the nation in passing in 2005, was No. 4 in scoring offense (39.4) and No. 6 in total offense (495.83). Quarterback Cody Hodges was No. 2 in the nation with 396.08 yards per game.

=== Houston ===
Houston had long been known for high-scoring offenses, from the Veer, which tallied 100 points in one game, to the Run and Shoot of the late 1980s, which set numerous college football records. As offensive coordinator at Houston, Holgorsen gained prominence and recognition as one of the most promising, up-and-coming offensive coaches in the country, and his success running the Cougar offense set the table for future coaching opportunities. During his two-year tenure with the Cougars, Holgorsen's offenses accounted for 563 yards of total offense per game, including 433.7 yards passing, and 42.2 points per game. His offense ranked No. 3 in total offense in 2008 with a duo of freshmen quarterbacks and No. 1 in 2009 behind the arm of Heisman finalist and All-Conference quarterback Case Keenum. In 2008–2009, quarterback Case Keenum led the nation in total offense, averaging 403.2 yards per game as a sophomore and 416.4 yards his junior season. He also ranked among the top 10 nationally in pass efficiency both years. Under Holgorsen's tutelage, Case Keenum would go on to become college football's all-time leading passer in yards gained and touchdowns. At Houston, Holgorsen demonstrated his own brand of the Air Raid offense that often used motion to confuse opposing defenses, as well as wearing them down. In 2009, Holgorsen developed a set called the "diamond formation," which features multiple diverging running backs in the backfield who use spread formations to gain yards after catching short passes. Houston's fast wide receivers were ideal to the style of spread Holgorsen ran, and Houston continued using much the same offense after Holgorsen departed to lead the NCAA with over 50 points per game, and 600 yards of offense per game in 2011. At Houston, Holgorsen mentored not only Case Keenum but offensive coaches including Kliff Kingsbury and Jason Phillips, who continued running a Holgorsen-inspired Air Raid offense at Houston.

=== Oklahoma State ===
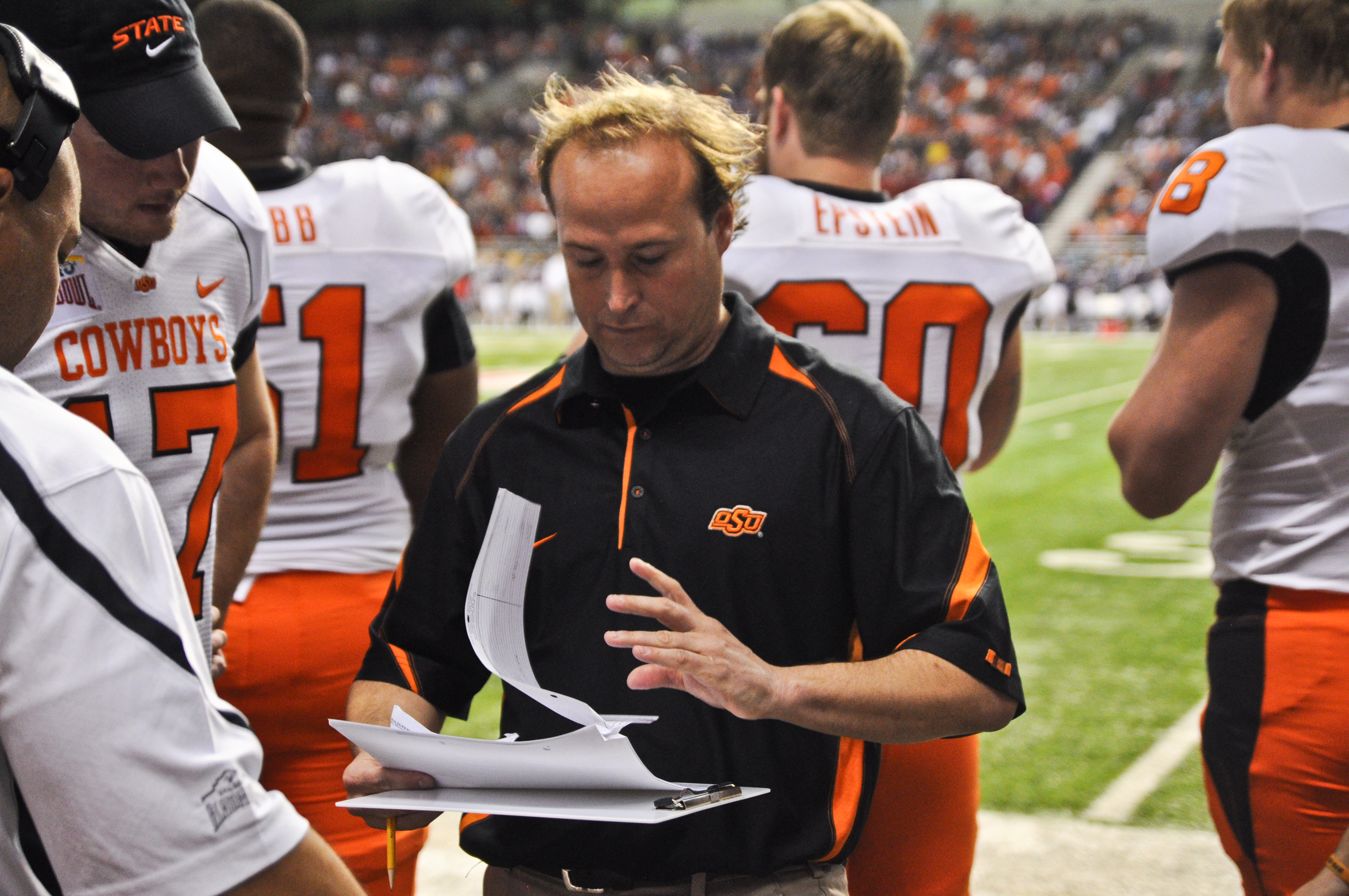
Holgorsen as offensive coordinator at Oklahoma State University

When Holgorsen was hired at Oklahoma State, the Cowboys' offense was ranked No. 61 nationally in total offense. In his first season, the offense led the nation in total offense, averaging 537.6 yards per game, was No. 2 in passing offense, averaging 354.7 yards per game, and No. 3 in scoring offense, averaging 44.9 points per game. The postseason accolades have been plentiful for Holgorsen's offensive players in 2010, quarterback Brandon Weeden became the first OSU passer to ever earn first team All-Big 12 honors. He was also a finalist for the Manning Award, given to the top quarterback in the nation. Wide receiver Justin Blackmon was named the recipient of the 2010 Biletnikoff Award, given to the top receiver in the nation, and running back Kendall Hunter was a finalist for the Doak Walker Award, given to the nation's top running back. Weeden, Hunter, and Blackmon became only the second trio in NCAA history to pass for at least 3,000 yards, run for more than 1,500 yards and finish with more than 1,500 yards receiving in the same season. Holgorsen was a 2010 finalist for the Broyles Award, given annually to the nation's top assistant coach.

These are the school records set by the Holgorsen-coordinated Oklahoma State offense during the 2010 season:

- Total yards: 6,451 Old record was 6,340, set in 2002
- Scoring: 539 points Old record was 530, set in 2008
- Passing yards: 4,256 Old record was 3,414, set in 2002
- Pass attempts: 491 Old record was 454, set in 2002
- Pass completions: 332 Old record was 243, set in 2002

=== West Virginia ===
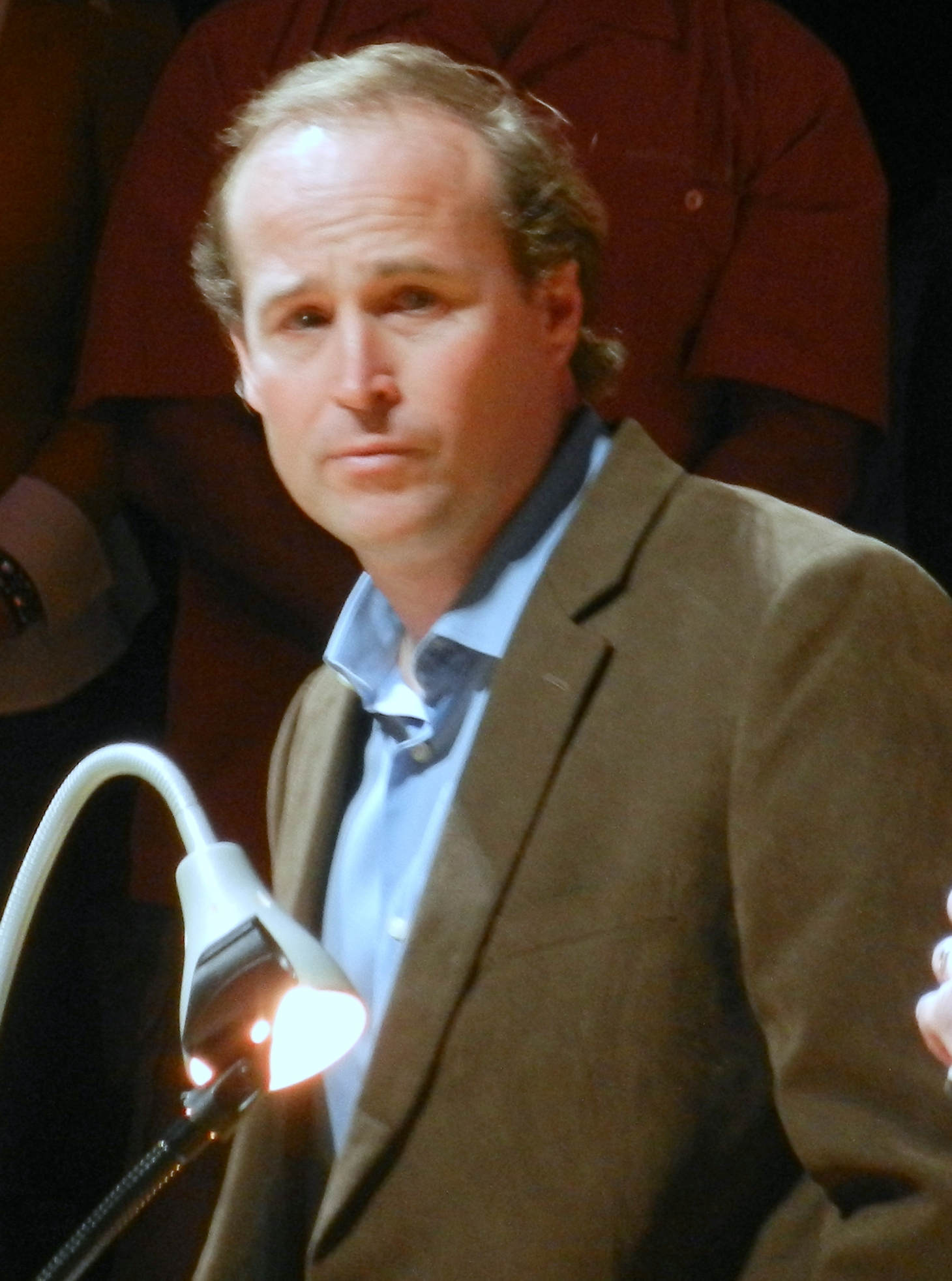
Holgorsen in 2012

On December 22, 2010, Holgorsen moved to West Virginia as offensive coordinator. At that time, athletic director Oliver Luck also announced that Holgorsen would replace Bill Stewart as head coach in 2012, saying that he didn't think Stewart was capable of leading the Mountaineers to a national championship.

The relationship between Stewart and Holgorsen was strained from the start and finally came to a head when Colin Dunlap, a former reporter from the Pittsburgh Post-Gazette, claimed Stewart had asked him and another reporter from the Charleston Gazette to dig up negative information about Holgorsen's behavior. Holgorsen did apologize for an early morning incident when he was asked to leave a West Virginia casino; no further negative information came forth. Although Luck was unable to fully substantiate the claims, he decided that Stewart had become too much of a distraction and forced Stewart to resign on June 10, naming Holgorsen the 33rd head coach in school history.

Luck had anticipated that the coach-in-waiting arrangement might not work as originally planned. Holgorsen's contract stated that his salary would be prorated at $1.4 million for the remainder of the season should he become head coach before 2012. In addition, the $250,000 annual bonus applied to the head-coaching salary would begin a year early, resulting in an additional $2 million over the six-year period addressed by his contract.

Holgorsen coached the Mountaineers to a share of the Big East Conference crown in his first season at WVU and a Bowl Championship Series berth in the 2012 Orange Bowl, WVU's first appearance in the Orange Bowl. WVU defeated Clemson 70–33 in that record-setting game. The successful season triggered $225,000 worth of bonuses for Holgorsen – $100,000 for a 10-win season, $75,000 for a BCS appearance and $50,000 for a BCS win.

In August 2012, Holgorsen received a new six-year contract. He received $2.3 million in the first year, with raises bringing his salary to $2.9 million at the end of the contract. He also was eligible for up to $600,000 in bonuses each year. The deal brought Holgorsen's compensation in line with other Big 12 coaches. In only his second year as a head coach, he ranked seventh in the 10-school conference in salary.

=== Houston ===
Holgorsen resigned from his West Virginia job on January 1, 2019, to accept the head-coaching position at Houston, where he previously was the offensive coordinator under head coach Kevin Sumlin. In 2022, he received a contract extension to go until 2027. Holgorsen was fired on November 26, 2023, following a losing season in the team’s first year as part of the Big 12 Conference. Houston agreed to pay $14.8 million in buyout money, but his deal included a mitigation clause that reduced the amount based on his subsequent employment. He was later hired, and then promoted, at Nebraska and his salary used to offset his buyout.

=== TCU ===
Holgersen served briefly, from July to November in 2024, as an analyst and advance scout for TCU.

=== Nebraska ===
On November 11, 2024, Nebraska head coach Matt Rhule announced that Holgorsen, who was initially hired as an offensive consultant, would serve as the Cornhuskers' offensive coordinator for the remainder of the 2024 season. He replaced former offensive coordinator Marcus Satterfield, who was assigned solely as the tight ends coach.

Holgorsen was relieved of his duties on November 7, 2026, following a 4-game losing streak during which the offense averaged only 13.5 points per game and failed to protect fourth-quarter leads in three of them.

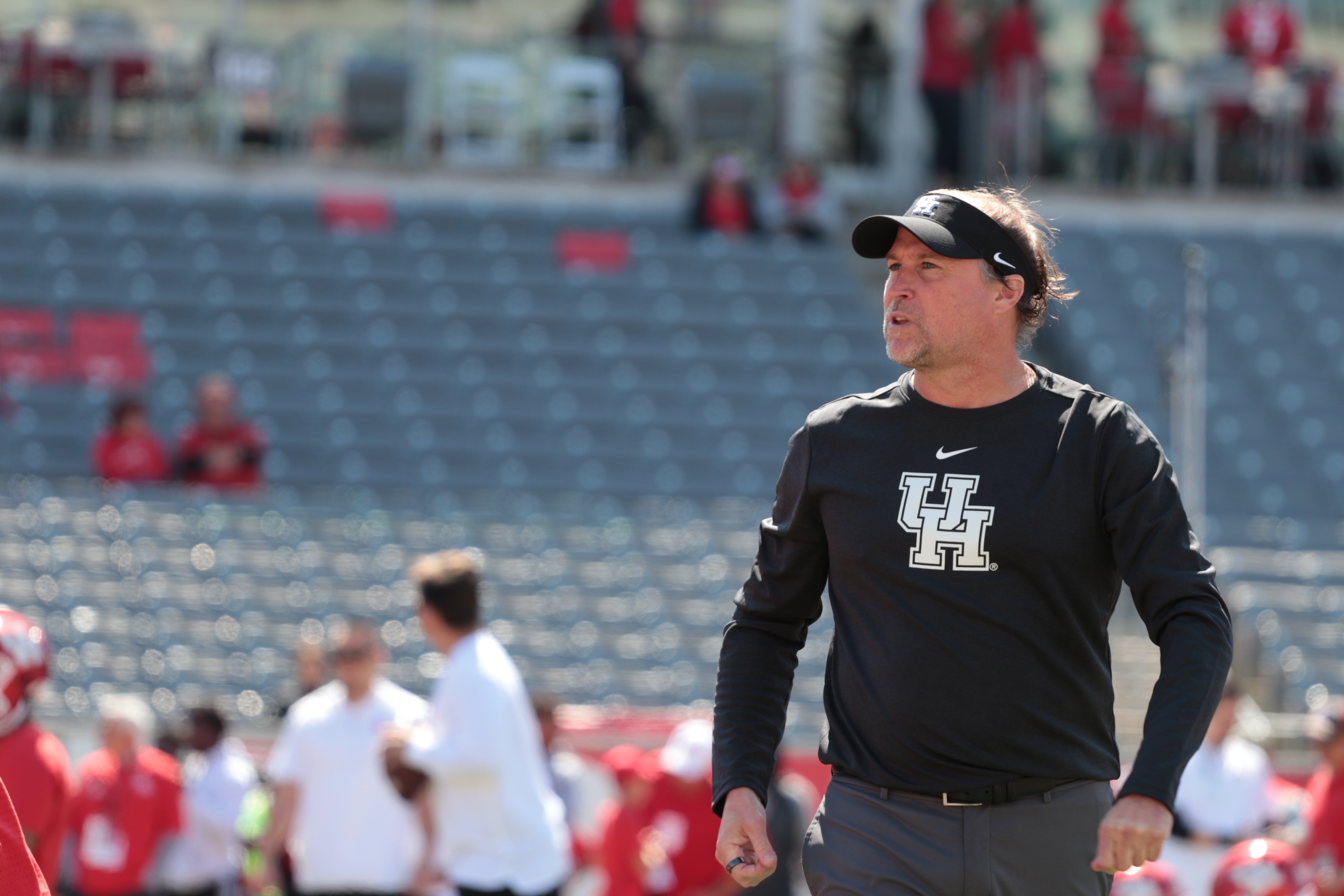
Holgorsen - Houston Cougars football vs. Cincinnati Bearcats

== Personal life ==
Holgorsen is a native of Mount Pleasant, Iowa, where he graduated from Mount Pleasant Community High School in 1989. Holgorsen played wide receiver at Iowa Wesleyan College, earning a degree in 1993 and a master's in health and physical education from Valdosta State University in 1995. Holgorsen had been recruited to Iowa Wesleyan by head coach Hal Mumme and offensive coordinator Mike Leach, both of whom he coached with later in their careers.

Holgorsen has three children: McClayne, Logan, and Karlyn. He built his home in Morgantown in 2014. The home is the first luxury residence in the U.S. to be built completely of cross-laminated timber.

== Head coaching record ==
| Year | Team | Overall | Conference | Standing | Bowl/playoffs | Coaches^{#} | AP^{°} |
|---|---|---|---|---|---|---|---|
West Virginia Mountaineers (Big East Conference) (2011)
| 2011 | West Virginia | 10–3 | 5–2 | T–1st | W Orange^{†} | 18 | 17 |
West Virginia Mountaineers (Big 12 Conference) (2012–2018)
| 2012 | West Virginia | 7–6 | 4–5 | T–5th | L Pinstripe | | |
| 2013 | West Virginia | 4–8 | 2–7 | T–7th | | | |
| 2014 | West Virginia | 7–6 | 5–4 | T–4th | L Liberty | | |
| 2015 | West Virginia | 8–5 | 4–5 | T–5th | W Cactus | | |
| 2016 | West Virginia | 10–3 | 7–2 | T–2nd | L Russell Athletic | 17 | 18 |
| 2017 | West Virginia | 7–6 | 5–4 | T–4th | L Heart of Dallas | | |
| 2018 | West Virginia | 8–4 | 6–3 | T–3rd | L Camping World | 22 | 20 |
| West Virginia: | | 61–41 | 38–32 | | | | |
Houston Cougars (American Athletic Conference) (2019–2022)
| 2019 | Houston | 4–8 | 2–6 | T–5th (West) | | | |
| 2020 | Houston | 3–5 | 3–3 | 6th | L New Mexico | | |
| 2021 | Houston | 12–2 | 8–0 | T–1st | W Birmingham | 17 | 17 |
| 2022 | Houston | 8–5 | 5–3 | T–4th | W Independence | | |
Houston Cougars (Big 12 Conference) (2023)
| 2023 | Houston | 4–8 | 2–7 | T–11th | | | |
| Houston: | | 31–28 | 20–19 | | | | |
| Total: | | 92–69 | | | | | |
National championship Conference title Conference division title or championship game berth
^{†}Indicates BCS or CFP / New Years' Six bowl.; ^{#}Rankings from final Coaches Poll.; ^{°}Rankings from final AP Poll.
