= 2020 New Mexico Bowl =

Postseason college football bowl game

- 15th New Mexico Bowl
Hawaii Rainbow Warriors	Houston Cougars
(4–4)	(3–4)
Mountain West	The American
28	14
Head coach: Todd Graham	Head coach: Dana Holgorsen
	1	2	3	4	Total
Hawaii	14	7	7	0	28
Houston	0	0	14	0	14
- Date: December 24, 2020
- Season: 2020
- Stadium: Toyota Stadium
- Location: Frisco, Texas
- MVP: Offense: Calvin Turner (WR, Hawaii); Defense: Darius Muasau (LB, Hawaii)
- Favorite: Houston by 7
- Referee: Chris Bynum (C-USA)
- Attendance: 2,060

United States TV coverage
- Network: ESPN & ESPN Radio
- Announcers: ESPN: John Schriffen, Rene Ingoglia and Kris Budden; ESPN Radio: Kevin Winter and Craig Haubert

International TV coverage
- Network: ESPN Deportes
- Announcers: Javier Trejo Garay and Jose Mondragon

The 2020 New Mexico Bowl was a college football bowl game played on December 24, 2020, at Toyota Stadium in Frisco, Texas, with kickoff at 3:30 p.m. EST (2:30 p.m. local CST) on ESPN. It was the 15th edition of the New Mexico Bowl, and was one of the 2020–21 bowl games concluding the 2020 FBS football season.

When the schedule for 2020–21 bowl games was announced in late October, a site for the New Mexico Bowl was not specified, due to health concerns related to the COVID-19 pandemic; it was also reported that contingency plans could result in the bowl being played in Texas. All prior editions of the bowl were played at Dreamstyle Stadium in Albuquerque, New Mexico. On November 24, ESPN Events announced that the bowl would be played at Toyota Stadium in Frisco, Texas.

== Teams ==
Based on conference tie-ins, the bowl was expected to feature teams from Conference USA (C-USA) and the Mountain West Conference. The matchup was announced on December 13, with the Houston Cougars from the American Athletic Conference (AAC or "The American") facing the Hawaii Rainbow Warriors from Mountain West. This was their second meeting, coming almost exactly 17 years after the 2003 Hawaii Bowl, a triple-overtime 54–48 win by Hawaii. That game ended with fighting between the teams, as players got into shouting matches and punches were thrown.

=== Hawaii ===
Hawaii entered the bowl with a record of 4–4, having only played conference games. Hawaii's most recent bowl game appearance in the contiguous United States had been the 2008 Sugar Bowl. From 2008 through 2019, the program played in five editions of the Hawaii Bowl.

=== Houston ===
Houston entered the bowl with an overall record of 3–4 (3–3 in conference games). They became one of a limited number of teams to enter a bowl game with a losing record.

== Game summary ==
2020 New Mexico Bowl

Quarter	1	2	3	4	Total
Hawaii	14	7	7	0	28
Houston	0	0	14	0	14

at Toyota Stadium • Frisco, Texas

- Date: Thursday, December 24, 2020
- Game time: 3:30 p.m. EST (2:30 p.m. CST)
- Game weather: Sunny • Temperature: 52 °F (11 °C) • Wind: NW 16 mph
- Referee: Chris Bynum (Conference USA)
- TV announcers (ESPN): John Schriffen (play-by-play), Rene Ingoglia (analyst) and Kris Budden (sideline)
- ESPN game summary

Game information

First quarter

- (10:43) HAW – Dae Dae Hunter 3 yard pass from Chevan Cordeiro, Matthew Shipley kick (Drive: 2 plays, 8 yards, 0:35; Hawaii 7–0)
- (3:35) HAW – Calvin Turner 75 yard pass from Chevan Cordeiro, Matthew Shipley kick (Drive: 1 play, 75 yards, 0:12; Hawaii 14–0)

Second quarter

- (8:05) HAW – Jonah Laulu 4 yard pass from Chevan Cordeiro, Matthew Shipley kick (Drive: 7 play, 80 yards, 3:17; Hawaii 21–0)

Third quarter

- (7:39) HOU – Nathaniel Dell 7 yard pass from Clayton Tune, Dalton Witherspoon kick (Drive: 17 plays, 75 yards, 7:21; Hawaii 21–7)
- (3:45) HOU – Christian Trahan 26 yard pass from Clayton Tune, Dalton Witherspoon kick (Drive: 5 plays, 83 yards, 2:03; Hawaii 21–14)
- (3:29) HAW – Calvin Turner 92 yard kickoff return, Matthew Shipley kick (Hawaii 28–14)

Fourth quarter
no scoring

=== Statistics ===
Statistics	HAW	HOU
First downs	11	20
Plays–yards	57–267	81–307
Rushes–yards	34–131	38–58
Passing yards	136	249
Passing: comp–att–int	15–23–0	21–43–3
Turnovers		
Time of possession	26:56	33:04

Team	Category	Player	Statistics
Hawaii	Passing	Chevan Cordeiro	15-for-23 for 136 yards, 3 TD
Hawaii	Rushing	Calvin Turner	60 yards on 12 carriers
Hawaii	Receiving	Calvin Turner	88 yards on 4 receptions, 1 TD
Houston	Passing	Clayton Tune	20-for-38 for 216 yards, 2 TD, 3 INT
Houston	Rushing	Mulbah Car	47 yards on 15 carries
Houston	Receiving	Nathaniel Dell	112 yards on 6 receptions, 1 TD

== See also ==
- 2020 Frisco Bowl, held at the same venue
