= 2020 SMU Mustangs football team =

American college football season

2020 SMU Mustangs football
- Conference: American Athletic Conference
- Record: 7–3 (4–3 The American)
- Head coach: Sonny Dykes (3rd season)
- Co-offensive coordinators: Garrett Riley (1st season); A. J. Ricker (1st season)
- Offensive scheme: Bear raid
- Defensive coordinator: Kevin Kane (3rd season)
- Base defense: 3–4
- Home stadium: Gerald J. Ford Stadium

Uniform
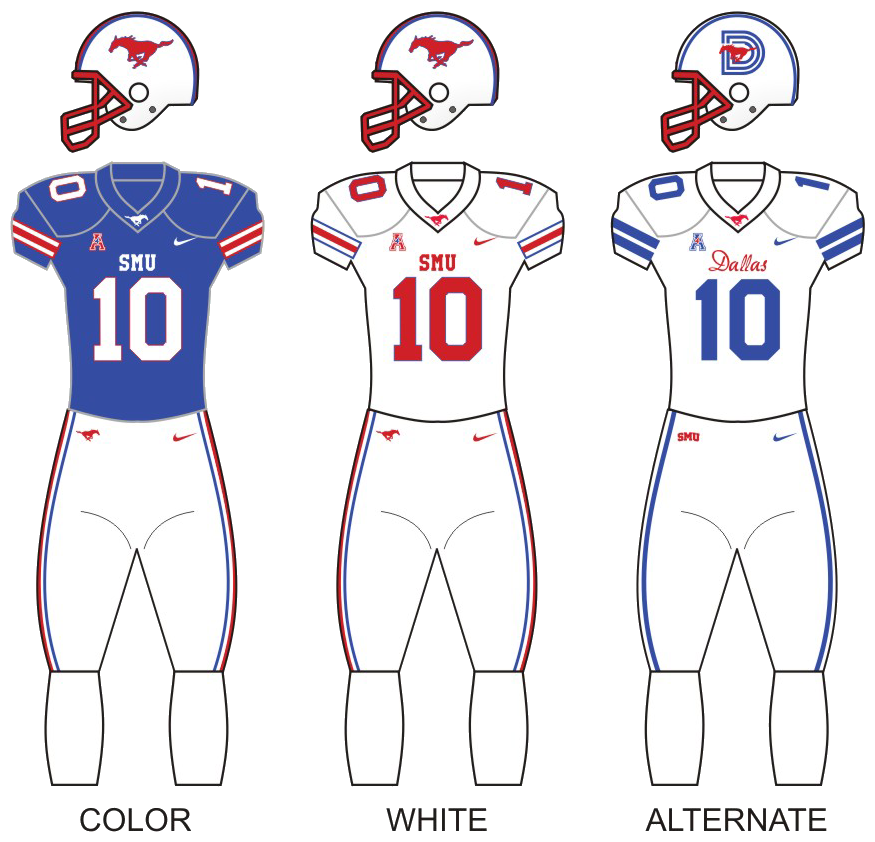

2020 American Athletic Conference football standings
	Conf.			Overall
Team	W		L	W		L
No. 8 Cincinnati y$	6	–	0	9	–	1
Tulsa y	6	–	0	6	–	3
Memphis	5	–	3	8	–	3
UCF	5	–	3	6	–	4
SMU	4	–	3	7	–	3
Houston	3	–	3	3	–	5
Navy	3	–	4	3	–	7
Tulane	3	–	5	6	–	6
East Carolina	3	–	5	3	–	6
Temple	1	–	6	1	–	6
South Florida	0	–	7	1	–	8
Championship: Cincinnati 27, Tulsa 24
$ – Conference champion; y – Championship game participant; Rankings from AP Poll.

The 2020 SMU Mustangs football team represented Southern Methodist University during the 2020 NCAA Division I FBS football season. The Mustangs were led by third-year coach Sonny Dykes and played their home games at Gerald J. Ford Stadium in University Park, Texas, a separate city within the city limits of Dallas, competed as members of the American Athletic Conference.

After finishing their regular season with a record of 7–3 (4–3 in conference play), the Mustangs accepted an invitation to the Frisco Bowl, where they were slated to play the UTSA Roadrunners. However, the bowl was subsequently canceled, due to COVID-19 concerns within the SMU football program.

== Preseason ==
=== Media poll ===
The preseason Poll was released September 1

Media poll
Predicted finish	Team	Votes (1st place)
1	UCF	204 (10)
2	Cincinnati	201 (7)
3	Memphis	192 (2)
4	SMU	146
5	Navy	125 (1)
6	Tulane	118
7	Houston	114
8	Temple	88
9	Tulsa	49
10	East Carolina	42
11	South Florida	41

=== Recruiting class ===
College recruiting
Name	Hometown	School	Height	Weight	40^{‡}	Commit date
Junior Aho; Defensive Lineman	Nice, France	New Mexico Military Institute	6 ft 4 in (1.93 m)	260 lb (120 kg)	–	Feb 5, 2020
Junior Aho; Defensive Lineman	Recruit ratings: Scout: Rivals: 247Sports: ESPN:					
Will Benton; Long Snapper/Linebacker	Atlanta, GA	The Westminster School	6 ft 0 in (1.83 m)	185 lb (84 kg)	–	Feb 5, 2020
Will Benton; Long Snapper/Linebacker	Recruit ratings: Scout: Rivals: 247Sports: ESPN:					
Marcus Bryant; Offensive Lineman	Round Rock, TX	Cedar Ridge HS	6 ft 6 in (1.98 m)	260 lb (120 kg)	–	Dec 18, 2019
Marcus Bryant; Offensive Lineman	Recruit ratings: Scout: Rivals: 247Sports: ESPN:					
Dylan Cordell; Offensive Lineman	Houston, TX	Second Baptist HS	6 ft 2 in (1.88 m)	285 lb (129 kg)	–	Feb 5, 2020
Dylan Cordell; Offensive Lineman	Recruit ratings: Scout: Rivals: 247Sports: ESPN:					
Ty DeArman; Safety	Arlington, TX	Bowie HS; Oklahoma	5 ft 11 in (1.80 m)	185 lb (84 kg)	–	Feb 5, 2020
Ty DeArman; Safety	Recruit ratings: Scout: Rivals: 247Sports: ESPN:					
Danny Gray; Wide Receiver	Dallas, TX	James Madison HS; Blinn College	6 ft 1 in (1.85 m)	180 lb (82 kg)	–	Dec 18, 2019
Danny Gray; Wide Receiver	Recruit ratings: Scout: Rivals: 247Sports: ESPN:					
Branson Hickman; Offensive Lineman	McKinney, TX	Jesuit College Prep	6 ft 2 in (1.88 m)	285 lb (129 kg)	–	Dec 18, 2019
Branson Hickman; Offensive Lineman	Recruit ratings: Scout: Rivals: 247Sports: ESPN:					
Thaddaeus "Thad" Johnson; Wide Receiver	Beaumont, TX	West Brook HS	6 ft 0 in (1.83 m)	175 lb (79 kg)	–	Dec 18, 2019
Thaddaeus "Thad" Johnson; Wide Receiver	Recruit ratings: Scout: Rivals: 247Sports: ESPN:					
Demetri Jordan; Offensive Lineman	Lubbock, TX	Coronado HS; Tyler JC	6 ft 5 in (1.96 m)	330 lb (150 kg)	–	Dec 18, 2019
Demetri Jordan; Offensive Lineman	Recruit ratings: Scout: Rivals: 247Sports: ESPN:					
DeVere Levelston; Defensive tackle	DeSoto, TX	DeSoto HS; Tyler JC	6 ft 4 in (1.93 m)	245 lb (111 kg)	–	Dec 18, 2019
DeVere Levelston; Defensive tackle	Recruit ratings: Scout: Rivals: 247Sports: ESPN:					
Bryan Massey; Cornerback/Safety	Katy, TX	Katy HS	5 ft 11 in (1.80 m)	185 lb (84 kg)	–	Feb 5, 2020
Bryan Massey; Cornerback/Safety	Recruit ratings: Scout: Rivals: 247Sports: ESPN:					
Mason Mastrov; Defensive End	Lafayette, CA	Campolindo HS	6 ft 3 in (1.91 m)	215 lb (98 kg)	–	Dec 18, 2019
Mason Mastrov; Defensive End	Recruit ratings: Scout: Rivals: 247Sports: ESPN:					
Henry Mossberg; Offensive Lineman	Southlake, TX	Southlake Carroll HS	6 ft 4 in (1.93 m)	290 lb (130 kg)	–	Feb 5, 2020
Henry Mossberg; Offensive Lineman	Recruit ratings: Scout: Rivals: 247Sports: ESPN:					
Dalton Perdue; Offensive Lineman	El Dorado, AR	El Dorado HS	6 ft 6 in (1.98 m)	315 lb (143 kg)	–	Dec 18, 2019
Dalton Perdue; Offensive Lineman	Recruit ratings: Scout: Rivals: 247Sports: ESPN:					
John Luke Roberts; Tight End/Long Snapper	Austin, TX	Austin Regents HS	6 ft 4 in (1.93 m)	210 lb (95 kg)	–	Feb 5, 2020
John Luke Roberts; Tight End/Long Snapper	Recruit ratings: Scout: Rivals: 247Sports: ESPN:					
Erin Smith; Offensive Lineman	Little Rock, AR	North Little Rock HS	6 ft 4 in (1.93 m)	270 lb (120 kg)	–	Dec 18, 2019
Erin Smith; Offensive Lineman	Recruit ratings: Scout: Rivals: 247Sports: ESPN:					
Marcus Smith; Offensive Lineman	Stafford, TX	Stafford HS	6 ft 3 in (1.91 m)	315 lb (143 kg)	–	Dec 18, 2019
Marcus Smith; Offensive Lineman	Recruit ratings: Scout: Rivals: 247Sports: ESPN:					
Ben Sparks; Offensive Lineman	Norman, OK	Norman HS	6 ft 4 in (1.93 m)	285 lb (129 kg)	–	Dec 18, 2019
Ben Sparks; Offensive Lineman	Recruit ratings: Scout: Rivals: 247Sports: ESPN:					
Parker Stone; Wide Receiver	Dallas, TX	Parish Episcopal School	5 ft 11 in (1.80 m)	185 lb (84 kg)	–	Feb 5, 2020
Parker Stone; Wide Receiver	Recruit ratings: Scout: Rivals: 247Sports: ESPN:					
Trent Strong; Linebacker	Tucson, AZ	Salpointe Catholic HS	6 ft 0 in (1.83 m)	225 lb (102 kg)	–	Feb 5, 2020
Trent Strong; Linebacker	Recruit ratings: Scout: Rivals: 247Sports: ESPN:					
Karl Taylor; Safety	Midland, TX	Midland Lee HS	6 ft 0 in (1.83 m)	180 lb (82 kg)	–	Dec 18, 2019
Karl Taylor; Safety	Recruit ratings: Scout: Rivals: 247Sports: ESPN:					
Warren Wells; Defensive End	Dallas, TX	Bishop Lynch HS	6 ft 4 in (1.93 m)	220 lb (100 kg)	–	Feb 5, 2020
Warren Wells; Defensive End	Recruit ratings: Scout: Rivals: 247Sports: ESPN:					

== Schedule ==
Date	Time	Opponent	Rank	Site	TV	Result	Attendance
September 5	3:30 p.m.	at Texas State*		Bobcat Stadium; San Marcos, TX	ESPN	W 31–24	7,500
September 19	5:00 p.m.	at North Texas*		Apogee Stadium; Denton, TX (Safeway Bowl)	CBSSN	W 65–35	8,464
September 26	6:00 p.m.	Stephen F. Austin*		Gerald J. Ford Stadium; University Park, TX	ESPN+	W 50–7	7,898
October 3	2:30 p.m.	No. 25 Memphis		Gerald J. Ford Stadium; University Park, TX	ESPN2	W 30–27	7,898
October 16	5:00 p.m.	at Tulane	No. 17	Yulman Stadium; New Orleans, LA	ESPN	W 37–34 ^{OT}	1
October 24	8:00 p.m.	No. 9 Cincinnati^{†}	No. 16	Gerald J. Ford Stadium; University Park, TX	ESPN2	L 13–42	7,898
October 31	6:30 p.m.	Navy	No. 22	Gerald J. Ford Stadium; University Park, TX (Gansz Trophy)	ESPN2	W 51–37	7,898
November 7	11:00 a.m.	at Temple	No. 18	Lincoln Financial Field; Philadelphia, PA	ESPN+	W 47–23	2,577
November 14	6:00 p.m.	at Tulsa	No. 19	H. A. Chapman Stadium; Tulsa, OK	ESPN2	L 24–28	3,900
November 28	11:00 a.m.	at East Carolina		Dowdy–Ficklen Stadium; Greenville, NC	ESPN+	L 38–52	3,500
*Non-conference game; ^{†}Homecoming; Rankings from AP Poll released prior to the game; All times are in Central time

== Rankings ==
Ranking movements Legend: ██ Increase in ranking ██ Decrease in ranking — = Not ranked RV = Received votes
	Week																	
Poll	Pre	1	2	3	4	5	6	7	8	9	10	11	12	13	14	15	16	Final
AP	RV	RV*	RV	RV	RV	18	17	16	22	18	19	RV	RV	RV	—	—	—	—
Coaches	RV	RV*	RV	RV	RV	21	18	16	23	18	19	RV	RV	—	RV	RV	RV	RV
CFP	Not released												—	—	—	—	—	Not released

== Personnel ==
2020 SMU Mustangs football team roster
Players
Coaches
Offense

Pos.	#	Name	Class
WR	0	Thad Johnson	Fr
QB	2	Josh Stupin	Fr
WR	3	T. Q. Jackson	Fr
WR	4	Tyler Page	Sr
WR	5	Danny Gray	Jr
WR	6	Austin Upshaw	Jr
QB	7	Shane Buechele	Sr
WR	8	Reggie Roberson Jr.	Sr
QB, WR	9	William Brown	So
QB	10	Terrance Gipson	Fr
WR	11	Rashee Rice	So
QB	12	Derek Green	So
WR	13	Judah Bell	Jr
WR	15	Calvin Wiggins	Fr
WR	16	Keke Burns	Fr
QB	18	Jacob Oehrlein	So
RB	20	Cameron Rosenberger	Fr
RB	21	Tamerik Williams	So
RB	22	Blake Bedwell	Fr
RB	24	Kade Ashley	Jr
RB	25	TJ McDaniel	So
RB	26	Ulysses Bentley IV	Fr
RB	31	Tyler Lavine	So
WR	35	Chad Dines	So
WR	36	Walker French	Jr
WR	39	Carter Campbell	Fr
TE	40	Gage Haskin	Fr
WR	42	Beau Barker	Fr
TE	44	Kedrick James	Jr
WR	45	Ben Palmer	Fr
WR	47	Devin Aglubat	Fr
WR	48	Devan Reck–Irvin	Fr
OL	51	Justin Osborne	Fr
OL	52	Marcus Bryant	Fr
OL	56	Branson Hickman	Fr
OL	57	Cobe Bryant	Sr
OL	59	Tai Brooks	Fr
OL	60	Henry Mossberg	Fr
OL	61	Dalton Perdue	Fr
OL	62	Marcus Smith	Fr
OL	63	Erin Smith	Fr
OL	64	Cameron Ervin	Fr
OL	65	Thomas Shelmire	So
OL	66	Sam Burns	Fr
OL	67	Dylan Cordell	Fr
OL	68	Jackson Ritz	Fr
OL	69	Ben Sparks	Fr
OL	70	Kadarius Smith	Sr
OL	71	Jaylon Thomas	Jr
OL	72	Demetri Jordan	Jr
OL	74	Tyler Bailey	Fr
OL	75	Hayden Howerton	Sr
OL	77	Alan Ali	Jr
OL	78	Beau Morris	Sr
OL	79	Danielson Ike	Fr
TE	81	Ben Redding	Jr
WR	82	Parker Stone	Fr
TE	83	Kylen Granson	Sr
WR	84	Matt Dorrity	Jr
WR	85	Keith Jones	So
TE	86	Tommy McIntyre	Sr
TE	89	John Luke Roberts	Fr
RB		Orlando Jones	Jr
TE		Alex Quirk	Fr

Defense

Pos.	#	Name	Class
CB	1	Brandon Crossley	So
DB	2	Cam Jones	So
LB	3	Delano Robinson	Sr
CB	5	Ar'Mani Johnson	Jr
CB, S	8	Bryan Massey	Fr
LB	9	Shaine Hailey	Sr
S	10	Ty DeArman	Fr
S	11	Chevin Calloway	Jr
S	13	Roderick Roberson Jr.	Fr
LB	14	Richard Moore	Sr
S	16	Trevor Denbow	Sr
S	18	Chace Cromartie	So
CB	20	Marcus Nesby	Fr
S	21	Donald Clay	Fr
DB	22	Karl Taylor	Fr
DB	23	Brandon Stephens	Sr
LB	24	Jimmy Phillips Jr.	Jr
LB	25	Carter Link	Fr
CB	26	Sam Westfall	So
S	27	Michael Salerno	Jr
CB	28	Christian Davis	Sr
CB	29	Justin Guy–Robinson	Jr
LB	30	Kyle Blaskovich	Jr
S	31	Tripp McAda	Fr
LB	32	JC Rispress	Jr
DL	33	Junior Aho	So
CB	34	Joshua Brown	Jr
LB	35	Armando Fitz	Jr
CB	36	Terry Keys III	So
DE	38	Toby Ndukwe	Jr
DT	39	Darren Brown	So
DT	40	Elijah Chatman	So
LB	41	Preston Ellison	Jr
S	42	Ra–Sun Kazadi	So
LB	43	Brian Holloway	Jr
S	44	Athan Natsues	So
LB	45	Luke Evans	Fr
DE	46	Garnett March II	Fr
S	47	Hunter Ballard	Fr
LB	48	Will Benton	Fr
LB	49	Nick Lerew	So
LB	50	Richard McBryde	Sr
DE	51	Warren Walls	Fr
LB	52	Deuce Palmer	Fr
LB	53	Garrett Madison	Fr
DE	54	Gerrit Choate	Sr
DE	55	Gary Wiley	Jr
LB	56	Cade Ellis	Fr
LB	56	Broc Watkins	Sr
DT	57	Mike Williams	Sr
LB	58	Eli Frugal	Fr
LB	59	Will Goldberg	Fr
LB	60	Reid Stacy	Fr
DE	61	Jack Young	Fr
LB	64	Ben Frugal	Fr
LB	65	John Porter	So
LB	66	Trent Strong	Fr
LB	67	Dalton Sawyer	Fr
DE	86	Brodie Burke	Fr
DL	88	Patrick Cinelli	Sr
DL	89	Alex Sickafoose	Fr
DE	90	Nelson Paul	So
DT	91	Terrance Newman	Jr
DT	92	Shabazz Dotson	So
DE	93	Bobby Duncum	Fr
DE	94	Mason Mastrov	Fr
DT	95	Will Jones	Sr
DT	96	DeVere Levelston	So
DE	97	Turner Coxe	Jr
DT	98	Jacob Pugh	Sr
DT	99	Harrison Loveless	Jr
DE		Thor Reneau	Fr

Special teams

Pos.	#	Name	Class
P	7	Matt Fraanje	Fr
K	32	Jack Hansing	Sr
K	34	Chris Naggar	Sr
LS	40	Gage Haskin	Fr
K	44	Charles Cannon	Jr
LS	48	Will Benton	Fr
LS	49	Cole Voyles	So
LS	89	John Luke Roberts	Fr
P	90	Nick Lang	Fr
K	94	Wills Thompson III	Fr
K, P	97	Russell Roberts	So
K	98	Austin Dennis	Fr
P	99	Warren Scott	So

Head coach

- Sonny Dykes (Texas Tech)

Coordinators/assistant coaches

- Kevin Kane (Kansas)
  Defensive coordinator/LB
- Garrett Riley (Texas Tech)
  Offensive coordinator/QB
- A. J. Ricker (Missouri)
  Co-offensive coordinator/OL
- Chris Brasfield (TCU)
  Assistant head coach/Special teams coordinator
- Kevin Curtis (Texas Tech)
  Cornerbacks
- *David Gru (California)
  Wide receivers
- Trey Haverty (TCU)
  Safeties
- Randall Joyner (SMU)
  Defensive line
- Josh Martin (Tarleton State)
  Tight ends
- Ra'Shaad Samples (Houston)
  Assistant coach

Legend

- (C) Team captain
- (S) Suspended
- (I) Ineligible
- Injured
- Redshirt

Roster
Last update: June 27, 2020

=== Depth chart ===
†

Defense

CB
⋅
⋅
⋅

CB
⋅
⋅
⋅

Offense

LT	LG	C	RG	RT
⋅	⋅	⋅	⋅	⋅
⋅	⋅	⋅	⋅	⋅
⋅	⋅	⋅	⋅	⋅

QB
⋅
⋅
⋅

Special teams

== Game summaries ==
=== At Texas State ===
Southern Methodist at Texas State – Game summary

Quarter	1	2	3	4	Total
Mustangs	0	14	14	3	31
Bobcats	0	14	7	3	24

at Bobcat Stadium, San Marcos, TX

- Date: Saturday, September 5
- Game time: 3:30 p.m. CDT
- Game weather: Cloudy • Temperature: 91 °F (33 °C) • Wind: E 8 mph
- Game attendance: 7,500
- Referee: Marshall Lewis
- TV announcers (ESPN): Anish Shroff (play-by-play), Tom Luginbill (analyst), and Kris Budden (sideline)

Game information

First quarter
No scoring
Second quarter

- (10:56) SMU – Ulysses Bentley IV 6 yard rush, Chris Naggar kick (Drive: 5 plays, 55 yards, 2:01; SMU 7–0)
- (6:04) TXST– Brock Sturges 4 yard rush, Alan Orona kick (Drive: 12 plays, 75 yards, 4:52; Tied 7–7)
- (3:47) SMU – Ulysses Bentley IV 12 yard rush, Chris Naggar kick (Drive: 7 plays, 65 yards, 2:17; SMU 14–7)
- (0:32) TXST – Jeremiah Haydel 3 yard pass from Brady McBride, Alan Orona kick (Drive: 9 plays, 75 yards, 3:15; Tied 14–14)

Third quarter

- (12:12) SMU – TJ McDaniel 9 yard rush, Chris Naggar kick (Drive: 9 plays, 75 yards, 2:48; SMU 21–14)
- (6:14) TXST – Chandler Speights 19 yard pass from Brady McBride, Alan Orona kick (Drive: 5 plays, 45 yards, 1:57; Tied 21–21
- (3:26) SMU – Reggie Roberson Jr. 51 yard pass from Shane Buechele, Chris Naggar kick (Drive: 6 plays, 83 yards, 2:48; SMU 28–21)

Fourth quarter

- (2:20) SMU – Chris Naggar 32 yard field goal (Drive: 5 plays, 35 yards, 1:31; SMU 31–21)
- (0:45) TXST – Alan Orona 47 yard field goal (Drive: 9 plays, 45 yards, 1:35; SMU 31–24)

Top passers

- SMU – Shane Buechele – 26/36, 367 yards, 1 TD, 2 INT
- TXST – Brady McBride – 21/39, 227 yards, 2 TD, 1 INT

Top rushers

- SMU – TJ McDaniel – 27 carries, 130 yards, 1 TD
- TXST – Calvin Hill – 13 carries, 100 yards,

Top receivers

- SMU – Rashee Rice – 5 receptions, 101 yards
- TXST – Trevis Graham Jr. – 3 receptions, 59 yards

Statistics	SMU	Texas State
First downs	26	22
Total yards	544	416
Rushing yards	177	189
Passing yards	367	227
Turnovers	3	2
Time of possession	32:03	27:57

=== At North Texas ===
Southern Methodist at North Texas – Game summary

Quarter	1	2	3	4	Total
Mustangs	21	13	21	10	65
Mean Green	0	7	14	14	35

at Apogee Stadium, Denton, TX

- Date: September 19
- Game time: 5:00 p.m. CDT
- Game weather: Clear • Temperature: 79 °F (26 °C) • Wind: NE 8 MPH
- Game attendance: 8,464
- Referee: Tony Calabrese
- TV announcers (CBSSN): Carter Blackburn (play–by–play), Aaron Taylor (analyst), and Jenny Dell (sideline reporter)

Game information

First quarter

- SMU – Reggie Robinson Jr. 15-yard pass from Shane Buechele (Chris Nagger kick), 12:33. Mustangs 7–0. Drive: 4 plays, 73 yards, 1:04.
- SMU – Danny Gray 62-yard pass from Shane Buechele (Chris Nagger kick), 9:44. Mustangs 14–0. Drive: 3 plays, 74 yards, 0:56.
- SMU – Kylen Granson 7-yard pass from Shane Buechele (Chris Nagger kick), 3:27. Mustangs 21–0. Drive: 9 plays, 80 yards, 2:39.

Second quarter

- SMU – Chris Nagger 37-yard field goal, 13:42. Mustangs 24–0. Drive: 8 plays, 4 yards, 3:39.
- UNT – Jaelon Darden 12-yard pass from Jason Bean (Ethan Mooney kick), 8:31. Mustangs 24–7. Drive: 10 plays, 64 yards, 2:42.
- SMU – Chris Nagger 22-yard field goal, 3:02. Mustangs 27–7. Drive: 7 plays, 52 yards, 2:48.
- SMU – Shane Buechele 2-yard run (Chris Nagger kick), 0:18. Mustangs 34–7. Drive: 8 plays, 84 yards, 1:31.

Third quarter

- UNT – DeAndre Torrey 7-yard run (Ethan Mooney kick), 12:02. Mustangs 34–14. Drive: 6 plays, 34 yards, 1:48.
- SMU – Ulysses Bentley IV 4-yard run (Chris Nagger kick), 10:53. Mustangs 41–14. Drive: 4 plays, 36 yards, 1:09.
- UNT – Austin Aune 5-yard run (Ethan Mooney kick), 8:44. Mustangs 41–21. Drive: 8 plays, 75 yards, 2:09.
- SMU – Reggie Robinson Jr. 2-yard pass from Shane Buechele (Chris Nagger kick), 5:42. Mustangs 48–21. Drive: 8 plays, 75 yards, 3:02.
- SMU – Ulysses Bentley IV 9-yard run (Chris Nagger kick), 0:11. Mustangs 55–21. Drive: 10 plays, 90 yards, 4:47.

Fourth quarter

- UNT – Jaelon Darden 33-yard pass from Austin Aune (Ethan Mooney kick), 14:02. Mustangs 55–28. Drive: 6 plays, 78 yards, 1:09.
- SMU – Ulysses Bentley IV 84-yard run (Chris Nagger kick), 12:12. Mustangs 62–28. Drive: 3 plays, 93 yards, 1:50.
- UNT – Deonte Simpson 55-yard pass from Austin Aune (Ethan Mooney kick), 10:52. Mustangs 62–35. Drive: 4 plays, 75 yards, 1:20.
- SMU – Chris Nagger 46-yard field goal, 5:33. Mustangs 65–35. Drive: 4 plays, −1 yard, 2:10.

Top passers

- SMU – Shane Buechele – 24/33, 344 yards, 4 TD
- UNT – Austin Aune – 13/25, 276 yards, 2 TD, INT

Top rushers

- SMU – Ulysses Bentley IV – 19 carries, 227 yards, 3 TD
- UNT – Oscar Adaway III – 20 carries, 104 yards

Top receivers

- SMU – Reggie Robinson Jr. – 9 receptions, 103 yards, 2 TD
- UNT – Jaelon Darden – 5 receptions, 66 yards, 2 TD

Statistics	SMU	North Texas
First downs	33	25
Total yards	710	517
Rushing yards	366	212
Passing yards	344	305
Turnovers	0	2
Time of possession	34:31	25:29

=== Stephen F. Austin ===
Stephen F. Austin at Southern Methodist – Game summary

Quarter	1	2	3	4	Total
Lumberjacks	0	0	7	0	7
Mustangs	22	7	7	14	50

at Gerald J. Ford Stadium, University Park, TX

- Date: September 26
- Game time: 6:00 p.m. CDT
- Game weather: Sunny • Temperature: 85 °F (29 °C) • Wind: SE 12 MPH
- Game attendance: 7,898
- Referee: Nate Black
- TV announcers (ESPN+): David Saltzman (play-by-play) and LaDarrin McLane (analyst)

Game information

First quarter

- SMU – Ulysses Bentley IV 33 Yd Run (Chris Naggar PAT blocked), 12:34. Mustangs 0–6. Drive: 7 plays, 63 yards, 2:26.
- SMU – Danny Gray 11 Yd pass from Shane Buechele (Chris Naggar Kick), 6:52. Mustangs 0–13. Drive: 10 plays, 69 yards, 3:36.
- SMU – Team Safety, 4:49. Mustangs 0–15.
- SMU – Kylen Granson 9 Yd pass from Shane Buechele (Chris Naggar Kick), 2:23. Mustangs 0–22. Drive: 5 plays, 44 yards, 2:12.

Second quarter

- SMU – Danny Gray 6 Yd Run (Chris Naggar Kick), 2:21. Mustangs 0–29. Drive: 10 plays, 68 yards, 3:19.

Third quarter

- SMU – Ulysses Bentley IV 13 Yd Run (Chris Naggar Kick), 9:42. Mustangs 0–36. Drive: 6 plays, 53 yards, 2:14.
- SFA – Trae Self 6 Yd Run (Chris Campos Kick), 1:22. Mustangs 7–36. Drive: 14 plays, 75 yards, 8:20.

Fourth quarter

- SMU – Terrance Gipson 3 Yd Run (Chris Naggar Kick), 8:44. Mustangs 7–43. Drive: 5 plays, 54 yards, 2:16.
- SMU – TaMerik Williams 5 Yd Run (Chris Naggar Kick), 6:01. Mustangs 7–50. Drive: 3 plays, 30 yards, 1:03.

Top passers

- SFA – Trae Self – 13/23, 133 yards, 1 INT
- SMU – Shane Buechele – 14/25, 144 yards, 2 TD

Top rushers

- SFA – Jaquarion Turner – 24 carries, 35 yards
- SMU – Ulysses Bentley IV – 6 carries, 104 yards, 2 TD

Top receivers

- SFA – Jeremiah Miller – 4 receptions, 41 yards
- SMU – Kylen Granson – 5 receptions, 38 yards, 1 TD

Statistics	Stephen F. Austin	SMU
First downs	14	24
Total yards	216	432
Rushing yards	51	260
Passing yards	165	172
Turnovers	1	0
Time of possession	34:25	25:35

=== Memphis ===
Memphis at Southern Methodist – Game summary

Quarter	1	2	3	4	Total
No. 25 Tigers	3	17	7	0	27
Mustangs	17	7	3	3	30

at Gerald J. Ford Stadium, University Park, TX

- Date: October 3
- Game time: 2:30 p.m. CDT
- Game weather: Sunny • Temperature: 81 °F (27 °C) • Wind: S 11 mph
- Game attendance: 7,898
- Referee: C. Lamertina
- TV announcers (ESPN2): Anish Shroff (play-by-play), Tom Luginbill (analyst), and Kris Budden (sideline)

Game information

First quarter

- SMU – Chris Naggar 27 Yd Field Goal, 10:34. Mustangs 0–3. Drive: 11 plays, 65 yards, 4:26.
- MEM – Riley Patterson 26 Yd Field Goal, 7:58. Tied 3–3. Drive: 11 plays, 67 yards, 2:36.
- SMU – Danny Gray 3 Yd pass from Shane Buechele (Chris Naggar Kick), 3:52. Mustangs 3–10. Drive: 10 plays, 75 yards, 4:06.
- SMU – Reggie Roberson Jr. 70 Yd pass from Shane Buechele (Chris Naggar Kick), 1:07. Mustangs 3–17. Drive: 3 plays, 75 yards, 1:20.

Second quarter

- SMU – Reggie Roberson Jr. 85 Yd pass from Shane Buechele (Chris Naggar Kick), 9:51. Mustangs 3–24. Drive: 3 plays, 80 yards, 1:47.
- MEM – Calvin Austin III 8 Yd pass from Brady White (Riley Patterson Kick), 7:16. Mustangs 10–24. Drive: 9 plays, 75 yards, 2:35.
- MEM – Sean Dykes 27 Yd pass from Brady White (Riley Patterson Kick), 3:30. Mustangs 17–24. Drive: 5 plays, 83 yards, 2:06.
- MEM – Riley Patterson 56 Yd Field Goal, 0:00. Mustangs 20–24. Drive: 4 plays, 23 yards, 0:22.

Third quarter

- SMU – Chris Naggar 25 Yd Field Goal, 9:29. Mustangs 20–27. Drive: 9 plays, 46 yards, 3:42.
- MEM – Tahj Washington 5 Yd pass from Brady White (Riley Patterson Kick), 2:53. Tied 27–27. Drive: 14 plays, 87 yards, 6:33.

Fourth quarter

- SMU – Chris Naggar 43 Yd Field Goal, 0:09. Tied 27–27. Drive: 8 plays, 33 yards, 1:16.

Top passers

- MEM – Brady White – 29/42, 296 yards, 3 TD, 2 INT
- SMU – Shane Buechele – 32/46, 474 yards, 3 TD

Top rushers

- MEM – Rodrigues Clark – 16 carries, 98 yards
- SMU – Ulysses Bentley IV – 13 carries, 32 yards

Top receivers

- MEM – Sean Dykes – 6 receptions, 85 yards, 1 TD
- SMU – Reggie Roberson Jr. – 5 receptions, 243 yards, 2 TD

Statistics	Memphis	SMU
First downs	26	21
Total yards	501	549
Rushing yards	205	75
Passing yards	296	474
Turnovers	4	2
Time of possession	30:51	29:09

=== At Tulane ===
Southern Methodist at Tulane – Game summary

Quarter	1	2	3	4	OT	Total
No. 17 Mustangs	10	7	10	7	3	37
Green Wave	7	10	7	10	0	34

at Yulman Stadium, New Orleans, LA

- Date: October 16
- Game time: 5:00 p.m. CDT
- Game weather: Mostly Cloudy • Temperature: 70 °F (21 °C) • Wind: N 14 mph
- Game attendance: 0
- Referee: Anthony Calabre
- TV announcers (ESPN): Beth Mowins (play-by-play), Kirk Morrison (analyst), and Lauren Sisler (sideline)

Game information

First quarter

- TULN – Mykel Jones 31 Yd pass from Michael Pratt (Merek Glover Kick), 11:32. Green Wave 0–7. Drive: 4 plays, 45 yards, 1:35.
- SMU – Danny Gray 32 Yd Run (Chris Naggar Kick), 9:59. Tied 7–7. Drive: 5 plays, 91 yards, 1:33.
- SMU – Chris Naggar 48 Yd Field Goal, 5:32. Mustangs 10–7. Drive: 7 plays, 43 yards, 2:00.

Second quarter

- TULN – Michael Pratt 1 Yd Run (Merek Glover Kick), 6:24. Green Wave 10–14. Drive: 11 plays, 72 yards, 5:29.
- TULN – Rashee Rice 10 Yd pass from Shane Buechele (Chris Naggar Kick), 2:43. Mustangs 17–14. Drive: 9 plays, 75 yards, 3:43.
- SMU– Merek Glover 34 Yd Field Goal, 0:44. Tied 17–17. Drive: 10 plays, 63 yards, 1:59.

Third quarter

- TULN – Stephon Huderson 22 Yd Run (Merek Glover Kick), 11:28. Green Wave 17–24. Drive: 6 plays, 49 yards, 1:38.
- SMU – Ulysses Bentley IV 2 Yd Run (Chris Naggar Kick), 10:26. Tied 24–24. Drive: 3 plays, 75 yards, 1:12.
- SMU – Chris Naggar 33 Yd Field Goal, 3:17. Mustangs 27–24. Drive: 11 plays, 74 yards, 6:16.

Fourth quarter

- TULN – Michael Pratt 7 Yd Run (Merek Glover Kick), 12:59. Green Wave 27–31. Drive: 6 plays, 37 yards, 2:21.
- SMU – Danny Gray 10 Yd pass from Shane Buechele (Chris Naggar Kick), 7:12. Mustangs 34–31. Drive: 14 plays, 81 yards, 5:47.
- TULN – Merek Glover 27 Yd Field Goal, 1:30. Tied 34–34. Drive: 13 plays, 65 yards, 5:42.

Overtime

- SMU – Chris Naggar 34 Yd Field Goal. Mustangs 37–34. Drive: 4 plays, 8 yards.

Top passers

- SMU – Shane Buechele – 23/37, 384 yards, 2 TD
- TULN – Michael Pratt – 12/29, 192 yards, 1 TD, 1 INT

Top rushers

- SMU – Ulysses Bentley IV – 25 carries, 94 yards, 1 TD
- TULN – Stephon Huderson – 19 carries, 132 yards, 1 TD

Top receivers

- SMU – Rashee Rice – 7 receptions, 139 yards, 1 TD
- TULN – Duece Watts – 3 receptions, 56 yards

Statistics	SMU	Tulane
First downs	25	23
Total yards	581	387
Rushing yards	142	195
Passing yards	439	192
Turnovers	1	1
Time of possession	31:01	28:59

=== Cincinnati ===
Cincinnati at Southern Methodist – Game summary

Quarter	1	2	3	4	Total
Bearcats	14	0	14	14	42
Mustangs	0	10	0	3	13

at Gerald J. Ford Stadium, University Park, TX

- Date: October 24
- Game time: 8:00 p.m. CDT
- Game weather: 58 °F (14 °C) • Weather: Cloudy • Wind: E 4 mph
- Game attendance: 7,898
- Referee: Luke Richmond
- TV announcers (ESPN2): Beth Mowins, Kirk Morrison, and Kris Budden

Game information

First quarter

- CIN – Josh Whyle 7 Yd pass from Desmond Ridder (Cole Smith Kick), 6:05. Bearcats 0–7. Drive: 12 plays, 70 yards, 5:32.
- CIN – Desmond Ridder 15 Yd run (Cole Smith Kick), 2:20. Bearcats 0–14. Drive: 4 plays, 50 yards, 1:41.

Second quarter

- SMU – Rashee Rice 9 Yd pass from Shane Buechele (Chris Naggar Kick), 6:23. Bearcats 7–14. Drive: 17 plays, 83 yards, 7:19.
- SMU – Chris Naggar 26 Yd field goal, 0:00. Bearcats 10–14. Drive: 8 plays, 63 yards, 2:50.

Third quarter

- CIN – Gerrid Doaks 1 Yd run (Cole Smith Kick), 6:13. Bearcats 10–21. Drive: 11 plays, 70 yards, 5:22.
- CIN – Desmond Ridder 32 Yd run (Cole Smith Kick), 3:22. Bearcats 10–28. Drive: 3 plays, 64 yards, 1:41.

Fourth quarter

- SMU – Chris Naggar 22 Yd field goal, 11:57. Bearcats 13–28. Drive: 11 plays, 82 yards, 3:36.
- CIN – Desmond Ridder 91 Yd run (Cole Smith Kick), 4:39. Bearcats 13–35. Drive: 1 play, 91 yards, 0:16.
- CIN – Gerrid Doaks 35 Yd run (Cole Smith Kick), 2:03. Bearcats 13–42. Drive: 3 plays, 43 yards, 1:41.

Top passers

- CIN – Desmond Ridder – 13/21, 126 yards, TD
- SMU – Shane Buechele – 23/44, 216 yards, TD, INT

Top rushers

- CIN – Desmond Ridder – 8 carries, 179 yards, 3 TD
- SMU – Ulysses Bentley IV – 16 carries, 40 yards

Top receivers

- CIN – Tre Tucker – 2 receptions, 24 yards
- SMU – Kylen Granson – 4 receptions, 68 yards

Statistics	Cincinnati	SMU
First downs	17	22
Total yards	439	290
Rushing yards	313	75
Passing yards	126	215
Turnovers	2	1
Time of possession	27:15	32:45

=== Navy ===
Navy at Southern Methodist – Game summary

Quarter	1	2	3	4	Total
Midshipmen	7	10	0	20	37
No. 22 Mustangs	0	31	14	6	51

at Gerald J. Ford Stadium, University Park, TX

- Date: October 31
- Game time: 6:30 p.m. CDT
- Game weather: Temperature: 66 °F (19 °C) • Wind: SSE 7 mph • Weather: Partly Cloudy
- Game attendance: 7,898
- Referee: Edwin Lee
- TV announcers (ESPN2): Anish Shroff (play-by-play), Tom Luginbill (analyst), & Ian Fitzsimmons (sideline)
- ESPN – Navy Midshipmen at No. 22 SMU Mustangs

Game information

First quarter

- (05:19) NAVY TD – Nelson Smith 3-yard rush, Bijan Nichols kick
  Drive: 13 plays, 76 yards, 6:38; Navy 7–0

Second quarter

- (14:52) SMU TD – Ulysses Bentley IV 4-yard rush, Chris Naggar kick
  Drive: 12 plays, 82 yards, 5:19; Tied 7–7
- (12:25) NAVY TD – Chance Warren 7-yard rush, Bijan Nichols kick
  Drive: 6 plays, 75 yards, 2:27; Navy 14–7
- (09:48) SMU TD – Ulysses Bentley IV 18-yard rush, Chris Naggar kick
  Drive: 6 plays, 71 yards, 2:32; Tied 14–14
- (07:35) SMU TD – Tyler Lavine 10-yard rush, Chris Naggar kick
  Drive: 5 plays, 57 yards, 1:10; SMU 21–14
- (01:18) NAVY FG – Bijan Nichols 46-yard field goal
  Drive: 10 plays, 46 yards, 6:17; SMU 21–17
- (00:07) SMU TD – Rashee Rice 5-yard pass from Shane Buechele, Chris Naggar kick
  Drive: 10 plays, 71 yards, 1:07; SMU 28–17
- (00:00) SMU FG – Chris Naggar 35-yard field goal
  Drive: 1 play, 0 yards, 0:01; SMU 31–17

Third quarter

- (10:32) SMU TD – Austin Upshaw 42-yard pass from Shane Buechele, Chris Naggar kick
  Drive: 6 plays, 80 yards, 1:54; SMU 38–17
- (05:17) SMU TD – Rashee Rice 20-yard pass from Shane Buechele, Chris Naggar kick
  Drive: 5 plays, 86 yards, 2:03; SMU 45–17

Fourth quarter

- (14:44) SMU TD – Tyler Lavine 48-yard rush, Chris Naggar kick blocked
  Drive: 5 plays, 78 yards, 2:10; SMU 51–17
- (12:37) NAVY TD – Jamale Carothers 62-yard pass from Tyger Goslin, Tyger Goslin rush failed
  Drive: 4 plays, 77 yards, 1:29; SMU 51–23
- (08:17) NAVY TD – Chance Warren 19-yard rush, Bijan Nichols kick
  Drive: 7 plays, 47 yards, 2:34; SMU 51–30
- (02:39) NAVY TD – Mychal Cooper 14-yard pass from Tyger Goslin, Bijan Nichols kick
  Drive: 11 plays, 90 yards, 4:06; SMU 51–37

Top passers

- NAVY – Tyler Goslin – 6/10, 123 yards, 2 TD
- SMU – Shane Buechele – 23/28, 300 yards, 3 TD

Top rushers

- NAVY – CJ Williams – 5 carries, 63 yards
- SMU – Ulysses Bentley IV – 25 carries, 149 yards, 2 TD

Top receivers

- NAVY – Jamale Carothers – 2 receptions, 91 yards, TD
- SMU – Ulysses Bentley IV – 4 receptions, 68 yards

Statistics	Navy	SMU
First downs	27	25
Total yards	430	555
Rushing yards	191	255
Passing yards	239	300
Turnovers	1	1
Time of possession	34:27	25:33

=== At Temple ===
Southern Methodist at Temple – Game summary

Quarter	1	2	3	4	Total
No. 18 Mustangs	7	3	10	27	47
Owls	13	0	3	7	23

at Lincoln Financial Field, Philadelphia, PA

- Date: November 5
- Game time: 11:05 a.m. CDT
- Game weather: 70 °F (21 °C) • Weather: Sunny • Wind: 5 MPH
- Game attendance: 2,577
- Referee: Charles Lamertina
- TV announcers (ESPN+): Dave Leno (play–by–play) and Ken Dunek (analyst)

Game information

First quarter

- TEM – Randle Jones 75 Yd pass from Tad Beatty (Rory Bell PAT failed), 14:47. Owls 0–6. Drive: 1 play, 75 yards, 0:13.
- SMU – Tyler Page 24 Yd pass from Shane Buechele (Chris Naggar Kick), 11:10. Mustangs 7–6. Drive: 10 plays, 85 yards, 3:31.
- TEM – Tayvon Ruley 3 Yd run (Rory Bell Kick), 1:32. Owls 7–13. Drive: 11 plays, 61 yards, 5:45.

Second quarter

- SMU – Chris Naggar 40 Yd Field Goal, 3:41. Owls 10–13. Drive: 14 plays, 45 yards, 5:32.

Third quarter

- SMU – Tyler Page 44 Yd pass from Shane Buechele (Chris Naggar Kick), 12:58. Mustangs 17–13. Drive: 5 plays, 65 yards, 2:02.
- SMU – Chris Naggar 27 Yd Field Goal, 8:36. Mustangs 20–13. Drive: 9 plays, 55 yards, 2:26.
- TEM – Rory Bell 26 Yd Field Goal, 1:14. Mustangs 20–16. Drive: 15 plays, 67 yards, 7:22.

Fourth quarter

- SMU – Kylen Granson 24 Yd pass from Shane Buechele (Chris Naggar PAT failed), 14:54. Mustangs 26–16. Drive: 5 plays, 75 yards, 1:20.
- SMU – Tyler Lavine 2 Yd run (Chris Naggar Kick), 12:42. Mustangs 33–16. Drive: 3 plays, 34 yards, 0:54.
- SMU – Rashee Rice 33 Yd pass from Shane Buechele (Chris Naggar Kick), 9:17. Mustangs 40–16. Drive: 5 plays, 81 yards, 2:31.
- SMU – TaMerik Williams 49 Yd run (Chris Naggar Kick), 7:32. Mustangs 47–16. Drive: 1 play, 49 yards, 0:09.
- TEM – Aaron Jarman 11 Yd pass from Re–al Mitchell (Rory Bell Kick), 0:35. Mustangs 47–23. Drive: 15 plays, 75 yards, 6:57.

Top passers

- SMU – Shane Buechele – 24/35, 355 yards, 4 TD
- TEM – Ted Beatty – 6/9, 108 yards, TD

Top rushers

- SMU – Ulysses Bentley IV – 17 carries, 79 yards
- TEM – Tayvon Ruley – 15 carries, 66 yards, TD

Top receivers

- SMU – Kylen Granson – 6 receptions, 149 yards, TD
- TEM – Randle Jones – 2 receptions, 86 yards, TD

Statistics	SMU	Temple
First downs	24	19
Total yards	549	368
Rushing yards	194	157
Passing yards	355	211
Turnovers	0	0
Time of possession	24:55	35:05

=== At Tulsa ===
Southern Methodist at Tulsa – Game summary

Quarter	1	2	3	4	Total
No. 19 Mustangs	14	10	0	0	24
Golden Hurricane	0	7	7	14	28

at Skelly Field at H. A. Chapman Stadium, Tulsa, OK

- Date: November 14
- Game time: 6:00 p.m. CDT
- Game weather: ;
- Game attendance: 3,000
- Referee:
- TV announcers (ESPN2): Anish Shroff, Tom Luginbill, Ian Fitzsimmons

Game information

First quarter

- SMU – 10:47 – Brandon Crossley 18-yard Interception return (Chris Naggar kick)
- SMU – 08:19 – Kylen Granson 22-yard pass from Shane Buechele (Naggar kick)

Second quarter

- SMU – 14:58 – Ulysses Bentley IV 1-yard rush (Naggar kick)
- TU – 06:15 – Josh Johnson 20-yard pass from Zach Smith (Zack Long kick)
- SMU – 02:37 – Naggar 45-yard field goal

Third quarter

- TU – 02:51 – T.K. Wilkerson 1-yard rush (Long kick)

Fourth quarter

- TU – 13:31 – Johnson 35-yard pass from Smith (Long kick)
- TU – 02:11 – James Palmer 4-yard pass from Smith (Long kick)

Top passers

- SMU – Shane Buechele – 18/36, 200 yards, TD, INT
- TUL – Zach Smith – 26/38, 325 yards, 3 TD, INT

Top rushers

- SMU – Ulysses Bentley IV – 26 carries, 103 yards, TD
- TUL – T.K. Wilkerson – 21 carries, 94 yards, TD

Top receivers

- SMU – Danny Gray – 8 receptions, 93 yards
- TUL – Keylon Stokes – 8 receptions, 122 yards

Statistics	SMU	Tulsa
First downs	27	25
Total yards	455	351
Rushing yards	130	151
Passing yards	325	200
Turnovers	2	1
Time of possession	29:18	30:42

=== At East Carolina ===
Southern Methodist at East Carolina – Game summary

Quarter	1	2	3	4	Total
Mustangs	7	0	17	14	38
Pirates	21	24	0	7	52

at Dowdy–Ficklen Stadium, Greenville, NC

- Date: November 28
- Game time: 11:05 a.m. CDT
- Game weather: 59 °F (15 °C) • Weather: Mostly Clear • Wind: Calm
- Game attendance: 3,500
- Referee: Edwin Lee
- TV announcers (ESPN+): Lincoln Rose (play–by–play) and LaDarrin McLane (analyst)

Game information

First quarter

- ECU – Keaton Mitchell 9 Yd run (Jake Verity Kick), 9:08. Pirates 0–7. Drive: 10 plays, 80 yards, 3:46.
- ECU – Blake Proehl 11 Yd pass from Holton Ahlers (Jake Verity Kick), 7:07. Pirates 0–14. Drive: 3 plays, 34 yards, 0:59.
- SMU – Kylen Granson 6 Yd pass from Shane Buechele (Chris Naggar Kick), 3:27. Pirates 7–14. Drive: 10 plays, 75 yards, 3:40.
- ECU – Blake Proehl 35 Yd pass from Tyler Snead (Jake Verity Kick), 0:00. Pirates 7–21. Drive: 8 plays, 75 yards, 0:00.

Second quarter

- ECU – C. J. Johnson 14 Yd pass from Holton Ahlers (Jake Verity Kick), 11:01. Pirates 7–28. Drive: 3 plays, 32 yards, 1:00.
- ECU – Keaton Mitchell 7 Yd pass from Holton Ahlers (Jake Verity Kick), 6:16. Pirates 7–35. Drive: 7 plays, 60 yards, 3:05.
- ECU – Tyler Snead 16 Yd pass from Holton Ahlers (Jake Verity Kick), 4:00. Pirates 7–43. Drive: 4 plays, 30 yards, 0:42.
- ECU – Jake Verity 29 Yd Field Goal, 0:01. Pirates 7–45. Drive: 7 plays, 47 yards, 1:30.

Third quarter

- SMU – Shane Buechele 1 Yd run (Shane Buechele two-point conversion pass to Rashee Rice), 8:12. Pirates 15–45. Drive: 12 plays, 80 yards, 4:42.
- SMU – Ulysses Bentley IV 26 Yd pass from Shane Buechele (two-point pass conversion attempt failed), 4:56. Pirates 21–45. Drive: 8 plays, 65 yards, 2:13.
- SMU – Chris Naggar 36 Yd Field Goal, 0:00. Pirates 24–45. Drive: 6 plays, 8 yards, 2:37.

Fourth quarter

- ECU – Darius Pinnix Jr. 2 Yd run (Jake Verity Kick), 13:15. Pirates 24–52. Drive: 5 plays, 75 yards, 1:45.
- SMU – Tyler Lavine 5 Yd run (Chris Naggar Kick), 7:28. Pirates 31–52. Drive: 5 plays, 75 yards, 1:30.
- SMU – Tyler Lavine 4 Yd run (Chris Naggar Kick), 7:05. Pirates 38–52. Drive: 2 plays, 14 yards, 0:23.

Top passers

- SMU – Shane Buechele – 35/50, 314 yards, 2 TD, 2 INT
- ECU – Holton Ahlers – 20/29, 298 yards, 4 TD

Top rushers

- SMU – Ulysses Bentley IV – 12 carries, 36 yards
- ECU – Keaton Mitchell – 20 carries, 68 yards, TD

Top receivers

- SMU – Austin Upshaw – 8 receptions, 78 yards
- ECU – Blake Proehl – 6 receptions, 152 yards, 2 TD

Statistics	SMU	East Carolina
First downs	26	28
Total yards	384	493
Rushing yards	70	160
Passing yards	314	333
Turnovers	3	2
Time of possession	29:43	30:17

== Players drafted into the NFL ==
Round	Pick	Player	Position	NFL Club
3	104	Brandon Stephens	CB	Baltimore Ravens
4	127	Kylen Granson	TE	Indianapolis Colts
