= 2020 East Carolina Pirates football team =

American college football season

2020 East Carolina Pirates football
- Conference: American Athletic Conference
- Record: 3–6 (3–5 AAC)
- Head coach: Mike Houston (2nd season)
- Offensive coordinator: Donnie Kirkpatrick (2nd season)
- Offensive scheme: Spread
- Defensive coordinator: Blake Harrell (1st season)
- Base defense: 3–4 or 4–2–5
- Home stadium: Dowdy–Ficklen Stadium

2020 American Athletic Conference football standings
	Conf.			Overall
Team	W		L	W		L
No. 8 Cincinnati y$	6	–	0	9	–	1
Tulsa y	6	–	0	6	–	3
Memphis	5	–	3	8	–	3
UCF	5	–	3	6	–	4
SMU	4	–	3	7	–	3
Houston	3	–	3	3	–	5
Navy	3	–	4	3	–	7
Tulane	3	–	5	6	–	6
East Carolina	3	–	5	3	–	6
Temple	1	–	6	1	–	6
South Florida	0	–	7	1	–	8
Championship: Cincinnati 27, Tulsa 24
$ – Conference champion; y – Championship game participant; Rankings from AP Poll.

The 2020 East Carolina Pirates football team represented East Carolina University in the 2020 NCAA Division I FBS football season. The Pirates, led by second-year head coach Mike Houston, played their home games at Dowdy–Ficklen Stadium as members of the American Athletic Conference.

== Schedule ==
East Carolina had games scheduled against Marshall, Norfolk State, and South Carolina, which were canceled due to the COVID-19 pandemic.

Date	Time	Opponent	Site	TV	Result	Attendance
September 26	12:00 p.m.	No. 13 UCF	Dowdy–Ficklen Stadium; Greenville, NC	ABC	L 28–51	305
October 3	12:00 p.m.	at Georgia State*	Center Parc Stadium; Atlanta, GA	ESPNU	L 29–49	3,823
October 10	7:00 p.m.	at South Florida	Raymond James Stadium; Tampa, FL	ESPN+	W 44–24	6,799
October 17	12:00 p.m.	Navy	Dowdy–Ficklen Stadium; Greenville, NC	ESPN2	L 23–27	3,500
October 30	8:00 p.m.	at Tulsa	Skelly Field at H. A. Chapman Stadium; Tulsa, OK	ESPN2	L 30–34	0
November 7	12:00 p.m.	Tulane	Dowdy–Ficklen Stadium; Greenville, NC	ESPN+	L 21–38	3,500
November 13	7:30 p.m.	at No. 7 Cincinnati	Nippert Stadium; Cincinnati, OH	ESPN2	L 17–55	0
November 21	12:00 p.m.	at Temple	Lincoln Financial Field; Philadelphia, PA	ESPN+	W 28–3	0
November 28	12:00 p.m.	SMU	Dowdy–Ficklen Stadium; Greenville, NC	ESPN+	W 52–38	3,500
*Non-conference game; Rankings from AP Poll and CFP Rankings after November 24 released prior to game; All times are in Eastern time

Schedule Source:

== Game summaries ==
=== UCF ===
Central Florida at East Carolina

Team	1	2	3	4	Total
• No. 13 Knights	10	17	14	10	51
Pirates	7	0	7	14	28

- Date: September 26, 2020
- Location: Dowdy–Ficklen Stadium
  Greeville, NC
- Game start: 12:05 p.m. EDT
- Elapsed time: 3 hours and 58 minutes
- Game attendance: 350
- Game weather: 79 °F (26 °C) • Weather: Mostly cloudy • Wind: 0 MPH
- Referee: Luke Richmond
- TV announcers (ABC): Dave Pasch (play-by-play), Mike Golic Sr. (color), and Paul Carcaterra (sideline)

Scoring summary
1	11:20	ECU	Darius Pinnix Jr. 17-yard pass from Holton Ahlers (Jake Verity kick) (9 plays, 75 yards, 3:40)	ECU 7–0
1	08:22	UCF	Greg McCrae 1-yard rush (Daniel Obarski kick) (11 plays, 75 yards, 2:58)	TIE 7–7
1	04:28	UCF	Daniel Obarski 26-yard field goal (7 plays, 26 yards, 1:34)	UCF 10–7
2	07:55	UCF	Daniel Obarski 33-yard field goal (10 plays, 50 yards, 3:07)	UCF 13–7
2	04:57	UCF	Jaylon Robinson 64-yard pass from Dillon Gabriel (Daniel Obarski kick) (4 plays, 78 yards, 0:57)	UCF 20–7
2	00:24	UCF	Jake Hescock 7-yard pass from Dillon Gabriel (Daniel Obarski kick) (9 plays, 86 yards, 2:45)	UCF 27–7
3	13:11	UCF	Jacob Harris 11-yard pass from Dillon Gabriel (Daniel Obarski kick) (8 plays, 75 yards, 1:49)	UCF 34–7
3	09:57	UCF	Jaylon Robinson 9-yard pass from Dillon Gabriel (Daniel Obarski kick) (6 plays, 55 yards, 1:44)	UCF 41–7
3	06:25	ECU	C. J. Johnson 37-yard pass from Holton Ahlers (Jake Verity kick) (8 plays, 92 yards, 3:31)	UCF 41–14
4	13:33	UCF	Daniel Obarski 31-yard field goal (9 plays, 66 yards, 2:20)	UCF 44–14
4	08:09	ECU	Darius Phinnix Jr. 3-yard rush (Jake Verity kick) (12 plays, 75 yards, 5:24)	UCF 44–21
4	03:59	UCF	Johnny Richardson 31-yard rush (Daniel Obarski kick) (1 play, 31 yards, 0:08)	UCF 51–21
4	00:19	ECU	Tyler Snead 7-yard pass from Holton Ahlers (Jake Verity kick) (11 plays, 77 yards, 3:40)	UCF 51–28

Statistics	UCF	East Carolina
First downs	29	25
Total yards	632	459
Rushing yards	224	244
Passing yards	408	215
Turnovers	0	4
Time of possession	26:52	33:08

Team	Category	Player	Statistics
UCF	Passing	Dillon Gabriel	32/47, 408 yards, 4 TDs
UCF	Rushing	Greg McCrae	16 carries, 83 yards, 1 TD
UCF	Receiving	Johnny Richardson	9 receptions, 150 yards, 2 TDs
East Carolina	Passing	Holton Ahlers	14/29, 215 yards, 3 TDs, 1 INT
East Carolina	Rushing	Keaton Mitchell	8 carries, 66 yards
East Carolina	Receiving	Audie Omotosho	3 receptions, 56 yards

=== At Georgia State ===
East Carolina at Georgia State

Team	1	2	3	4	Total
Pirates	7	6	3	13	29
• Panthers	21	14	0	14	49

- Date: October 3, 2020
- Location: Center Parc Stadium
  Atlanta, GA
- Game start: 12:02 p.m. EDT
- Elapsed time: 3 hours and 28 minutes
- Game attendance: 3,823
- Game weather: 65 °F (18 °C) • Weather: Sunny • Wind: 6 W MPH
- Referee: Marshall Lewis
- TV announcers (ESPNU): Mike Couzens (play–by–play) and Dustin Fox (analyst)

Scoring summary
1	14:54	ECU	Warren Saba 28-yard interception returned (Jake Verity kick) (1 play, 0 yards, 0:06)	ECU 7–0
1	13:30	GSU	Destin Coates 13-yard rush (Noel Ruiz kick) (5 plays, 75 yards, 1:24)	TIE 7–7
1	11:02	GSU	Sam Pinckney 38-yard pass from Cornelious Brown (Noel Ruiz kick) (2 plays, 61 yards, 0:23)	GSU 14–7
1	07:19	GSU	Jamari Thrash 22-yard pass from Cornelious Brown (Noel Ruiz kick) (9 plays, 61 yards, 3:07)	GSU 21–7
2	12:45	GSU	Tucker Gregg 4-yard rush (Noel Ruiz kick) (7 plays, 77 yards, 3:03)	GSU 28–7
2	07:44	ECU	Jake Verity 34-yard field goal (11 plays, 57 yards, 5:01)	GSU 28–10
2	05:26	GSU	Sam Pinckney 13-yard pass from Cornelious Brown (Noel Ruiz kick) (5 plays, 44 yards, 1:37)	GSU 35–10
2	00:00	ECU	Jake Verity 40-yard field goal (13 plays, 54 yards, 5:26)	GSU 35–13
3	00:05	ECU	Jake Verity 48-yard field goal (7 plays, 29 yards, 3:09)	GSU 35–16
4	13:12	GSU	Antavious Lane 34-yard interception returned (Noel Ruiz kick) (1 play, 0 yards, 0:12)	GSU 42–16
4	10:30	ECU	Tyler Snead 31-yard rush (Noel Ruiz kick) (7 plays, 65 yards, 2:42)	GSU 42–23
4	08:07	ECU	Blake Proehl 29-yard blocked punt returned (Jake Verity PAT failed) (5 plays, 21 yards, 2:23)	GSU 42–29
4	00:23	GSU	Destin Coates 5-yard rush (Noel Ruiz kick) (6 plays, 37 yards, 2:38)	GSU 49–29

Statistics	East Carolina	Georgia State
First downs	19	21
Total yards	286	485
Rushing yards	50	247
Passing yards	236	238
Turnovers	3	3
Time of possession	33:05	26:55

Team	Category	Player	Statistics
East Carolina	Passing	Holton Ahlers	29/50, 236 yards, 3 INTs
East Carolina	Rushing	Tyler Snead	1 carry, 31 yards, 1 TD
East Carolina	Receiving	Tyler Snead	11 receptions, 105 yards
Georgia State	Passing	Cornelious Brown	18/28, 238 yards, 3 TDs, 2 INTs
Georgia State	Rushing	Destin Coates	23 carries, 113 yards, 2 TDs
Georgia State	Receiving	Sam Pinckney	7 receptions, 134 yards, 2 TDs

=== At South Florida ===
East Carolina at South Florida

Team	1	2	3	4	Total
• Pirates	17	14	7	6	44
Bulls	7	10	0	0	17

- Date: October 10, 2020
- Location: Raymond James Stadium
  Tampa, FL
- Game start: 7:00 p.m. EDT
- Elapsed time: 3 hours and 10 minutes
- Game attendance: 6,799
- Referee: Anthony Calabre
- TV announcers (ESPN+): Lincoln Rose (play–by–play) and Stanford Routt (analyst)

Scoring summary
1	10:35	ECU	Jake Verity 25-yard field goal (11 plays, 67 yards, 4:25)	ECU 3–0
1	08:58	USF	Johnny Ford 8-yard rush (Kenny Scribner kick) (6 plays, 65 yards, 1:37)	USF 7–3
1	03:50	ECU	Darius Pinnix 2-yard pass from Holton Ahlers (Jake Verity kick) (12 plays, 59 yards, 5:08)	ECU 10–7
1	00:16	ECU	C. J. Johnson 75-yard pass from Holton Ahlers (Jake Verity kick) (3 plays, 78 yards, 1:16)	ECU 17–7
2	13:18	ECU	Rahjai Harris 42-yard rush (Jake Verity kick) (1 play, 42 yards, 0:08)	ECU 24–7
2	04:59	USF	Johnny Ford 7-yard rush (Kenny Scribner kick) (5 plays, 80 yards, 1:55)	ECU 24–14
2	02:17	ECU	Rahjai Harris 10-yard rush (Jake Verity kick) (1 play, 10 yards, 0:05)	ECU 31–14
2	00:32	USF	Jared Sackett 31-yard field goal (11 plays, 61 yards, 1:45)	ECU 31–17
3	00:10	ECU	C. J. Johnson 14-yard pass from Holton Ahlers (Jake Verity kick) (8 plays, 50 yards, 4:23)	ECU 38–17
4	13:20	ECU	Jake Verity 42-yard field goal (4 plays, 6 yards, 1:33)	ECU 41–17
4	03:14	ECU	Jake Verity 37-yard field goal (15 plays, 54 yards, 8:46)	ECU 44–17
4	00:31	USF	Noah Johnson 15-yard rush (Jared Sackett kick) (7 plays, 54 yards, 2:43)	ECU 44–24

Statistics	East Carolina	South Florida
First downs	21	22
Total yards	432	398
Rushing yards	210	92
Passing yards	222	306
Turnovers	0	2
Time of possession	35:36	24:24

Team	Category	Player	Statistics
East Carolina	Passing	Holton Ahlers	17/26, 222 yards, 3 TDs
East Carolina	Rushing	Rahjai Harris	19 carries, 115 yards, 1 TD
East Carolina	Receiving	C. J. Johnson	3 receptions, 99 yards, 2 TDs
South Florida	Passing	Jordan McCloud	26/35, 298 yards
South Florida	Rushing	Johnny Ford	8 carries, 44 yards, 2 TDs
South Florida	Receiving	Latrell Williams	8 receptions, 93 yards

=== Navy ===
Navy at East Carolina

Team	1	2	3	4	Total
• Midshipmen	7	6	14	0	27
Pirates	6	7	0	10	23

- Date: October 17, 2020
- Location: Dowdy–Ficklen Stadium
  Greeville, NC
- Game start: 12:01 p.m. EDT
- Elapsed time: 3 hours and 18 minutes
- Game attendance: 3,500
- Game weather: 61 °F (16 °C) • Weather: Mostly Sunny • Wind: NNE 10 MPH
- Referee: Edwin Lee
- TV announcers (ESPN2): Lincoln Rose (play–by–play) and Keith Moreland (analyst)

Scoring summary
1	08:21	NAVY	Nelson Smith 20-yard rush (Bijan Nichols kick) (6 plays, 50 yards, 3:06)	NAVY 7–0
1	04:44	ECU	Jake Verity 40-yard field goal (10 plays, 52 yards, 3:37)	NAVY 7–3
1	02:23	ECU	Jake Verity 25-yard field goal (5 plays, 17 yards, 1:47)	NAVY 7–6
2	07:03	ECU	Mason Garcia 3-yard rush (Jake Verity kick) (8 plays, 44 yards, 3:07)	ECU 13–7
2	03:48	NAVY	Dalen Morris 9-yard rush (Bijan Nichols PAT failed) (7 plays, 75 yards, 3:15)	TIE 13–13
3	08:51	NAVY	Nelson Smith 29-yard rush (Bijan Nichols kick) (3 plays, 59 yards, 1:21)	NAVY 20–13
3	00:00	NAVY	Jamale Carothers 3-yard rush (Bijan Nichols kick) (12 plays, 50 yards, 0:00)	NAVY 27–13
4	14:15	ECU	Rahjai Harris 80-yard rush (Jake Verity kick) (2 plays, 84 yards, 0:00)	NAVY 27–20
4	06:33	ECU	Jake Verity 39-yard field goal (12 plays, 45 yards, 5:54)	NAVY 27–23

Statistics	Navy	East Carolina
First downs	17	19
Total yards	318	372
Rushing yards	288	268
Passing yards	30	104
Turnovers	2	2
Time of possession	31:29	28:31

Team	Category	Player	Statistics
Navy	Passing	Dalen Morris	3/4, 30 yards, 1 INT
Navy	Rushing	Nelson Smith	17 carries, 157 yards, 2 TDs
Navy	Receiving	Ryan Mitchell	1 reception, 14 yards
East Carolina	Passing	Mason Garcia	10/20, 104 yards
East Carolina	Rushing	Rahjai Harris	22 carries, 172 yards, 1 TD
East Carolina	Receiving	Tyler Snead	4 receptions, 39 yards

=== At Tulsa ===
East Carolina at Tulsa

Team	1	2	3	4	Total
Pirates	7	10	3	10	30
• Golden Hurricane	3	0	17	14	34

- Date: October 30, 2020
- Location: Skelly Field at H. A. Chapman Stadium
  Tulsa, OK
- Game start: 8:00 p.m. EDT
- Elapsed time: 3:40
- Game attendance: 0
- Game weather: 53 °F (12 °C) • Weather: Clear • Wind: SSW 5 MPH
- Referee: A. Calabarese
- TV announcers (ESPN2): Clay Matvick (play–by–play) and Rocky Boiman (analyst)

Scoring summary
1	11:08	ECU	Tyler Snead 16 Yd pass from Holton Ahlers (Jake Verity Kick) (4 plays, 42 yards, 1:31)	ECU 7–0
1	03:35	TULSA	Zack Long 35 Yd Field Goal (9 plays, 38 yards, 4:01)	ECU 7–3
2	10:42	ECU	C.J. Johnson 25 Yd pass from Holton Ahlers (Jake Verity Kick) (10 plays, 90 yards, 4:18)	ECU 14–3
2	01:58	ECU	Jake Verity 46 Yd Field Goal (11 plays, 60 yards, 6:31)	ECU 17–3
3	13:23	TULSA	Keylon Stokes 25 Yd pass from Zach Smith (Zack Long Kick) (5 plays, 78 yards, 1:37)	ECU 17–10
3	09:15	ECU	Jake Verity 22 Yd Field Goal (11 plays, 68 yards, 4:08)	ECU 20–10
3	06:19	TULSA	T.K. Wilkerson 13 Yd Run (Zack Long Kick) (12 plays, 74 yards, 2:56)	ECU 20–17
3	04:15	TULSA	Zack Long 21 Yd Field Goal (4 plays, 0 yards, 0:47)	TIED 20–20
4	12:34	ECU	Jake Verity 38 Yd Field Goal (7 plays, 14 yards, 2:10)	ECU 23–20
4	09:14	TULSA	JuanCarlos Santana 39 Yd pass from Zach Smith (Zack Long Kick) (8 plays, 75 yards, 3:20)	TULSA 23–27
4	04:24	ECU	Rahjai Harris 4 Yd pass from Holton Ahlers (Jake Verity Kick) (11 plays, 85 yards, 4:50)	ECU 30–27
4	00:29	TULSA	T.K. Wilkerson 1 Yd Run (Zack Long Kick) (11 plays, 75 yards, 3:55)	TULSA 30–34

Statistics	East Carolina	Tulsa
First downs	27	25
Total yards	456	428
Rushing yards	126	175
Passing yards	330	253
Turnovers	3	3
Time of possession	35:09	24:51

Team	Category	Player	Statistics
East Carolina	Passing	Holton Ahlers	38/50, 330 yards, 3 TDs, 1 INT
East Carolina	Rushing	Rahjai Harris	21 carries, 118 yards
East Carolina	Receiving	Tyler Snead	16 receptions, 108 yards, 1 TD
Tulsa	Passing	Zach Smith	19/37, 253 yards, 2 TDs, 2 INTs
Tulsa	Rushing	T.K. Wilkerson	18 carries, 89 yards, 2 TDs
Tulsa	Receiving	Keylon Stokes	6 receptions, 90 yards, 1 TD

=== Tulane ===
Tulane at East Carolina

Team	1	2	3	4	Total
• Green Wave	7	14	10	7	38
Pirates	7	0	0	14	21

- Date: November 7, 2020
- Location: Dowdy–Ficklen Stadium
  Greenville, NC
- Game start: 12:05 a.m. EST
- Elapsed time: 3 hours and 11 minutes
- Game attendance: 3,500
- Game weather: 75 °F (24 °C) • Weather: Mostly Clear • Wind: E 5 MPH
- Referee: Luke Richmond
- TV announcers (ESPN+): Evan Lepler (play–by–play) and Jay Sonnhalter (analyst)

Scoring summary
1	11:09	TULN	Deuce Watts 35-yard pass from Michael Pratt (Merek Glover kick) (9 plays, 78 yards, 3:51)	TULN 7–0
1	06:48	ECU	Tyler Snead 10-yard pass from Holton Ahlers (Jake Verity kick) (10 plays, 75 yards, 4:21)	TIE 7–7
2	07:28	TULN	Tyrick James 5-yard pass from Michael Pratt (Merek Glover kick) (4 plays, 54 yards, 1:58)	TULN 14–7
2	00:38	TULN	Deuce Watts 5-yard pass from Michael Pratt (Merek Glover kick) (7 plays, 65 yards, 2:58)	TULN 21–7
3	05:49	TULN	Cameron Carroll 48-yard rush (Merek Glover kick) (4 plays, 65 yards, 1:57)	TULN 28–7
3	00:38	TULN	Merek Glover 42-yard field goal (7 plays, 37 yards, 3:15)	TULN 31–7
4	10:37	ECU	Blake Proehl 30-yard pass from Holton Ahlers (Holton Ahlers two-point conversion pass to Tyler Snead) (4 plays, 35 yards, 1:53)	TULN 31–15
4	05:17	TULN	Cameron Carroll 28-yard rush (Merek Glover kick) (1 play, 28 yards, 0:06)	TULN 38–15
4	05:07	ECU	Blake Proehl 75-yard pass from Holton Ahlers (two-point conversion pass attempt failed) (1 play, 75 yards, 0:10)	TULN 38–21

Statistics	Tulane	East Carolina
First downs	24	20
Total yards	493	386
Rushing yards	277	35
Passing yards	216	351
Turnovers	1	1
Time of possession	30:59	29:01

Team	Category	Player	Statistics
Tulane	Passing	Michael Pratt	22/34, 216 yards, 3 TDs, 1 INT
Tulane	Rushing	Cameron Carroll	6 carries, 129 yards, 2 TDs
Tulane	Receiving	Duece Watts	5 receptions, 57 yards, 2 TDs
East Carolina	Passing	Holton Ahlers	27/43, 351 yards, 3 TDs
East Carolina	Rushing	Rahjai Harris	13 carries, 27 yards
East Carolina	Receiving	Blake Proehl	13 receptions, 182 yards, 2 TDs

=== At Cincinnati ===
East Carolina at Cincinnati

Team	1	2	3	4	Total
Pirates	0	10	0	7	17
• No. 7 Bearcats	7	28	7	13	55

- Date: November 13, 2020
- Location: Nippert Stadium
  Cincinnati, OH
- Game start: 7:31 p.m. EST
- Elapsed time: 3 hours and 37 minutes
- Game attendance: 0
- Game weather: 43 °F (6 °C) • Weather: Clear • Wind: NW 10 MPH
- Referee: Tim Rich
- TV announcers (ESPN2): Jason Benetti (play–by–play), Andre Ware (analyst), and Rocky Boiman (sideline reporter)

Scoring summary
1	09:14	CIN	Michael Young 33-yard pass from Desmond Ridder (Cole Smith kick) (10 plays, 79 yards, 4:34)	CIN 0–7
2	14:52	CIN	Jarell White 26-yard Interception (Cole Smith kick) (6 plays, 18 yards, 2:08)	CIN 0–14
2	10:36	ECU	Keaton Mitchell 18-yard rush (Jake Verity kick) (3 plays, 58 yards, 0:50)	CIN 7–14
2	08:23	CIN	Jerome Ford 24-yard rush (Cole Smith kick) (6 plays, 70 yards, 2:09)	CIN 7–21
2	05:25	ECU	Jake Verity 32-yard field goal (7 plays, 44 yards, 2:04)	CIN 10–21
2	05:18	CIN	Tre Tucker 45-yard pass from Desmond Ridder (Cole Smith kick) (1 play, 45 yards, 0:07)	CIN 10–28
2	01:32	CIN	Desmond Ridder 7-yard rush (Cole Smith kick) (7 plays, 53 yards, 3:04)	CIN 10–35
3	00:29	CIN	Jayshon Jackson 12-yard pass from Desmond Ridder (Cole Smith kick) (11 plays, 85 yards, 4:06)	CIN 10–42
4	05:41	CIN	Jerome Ford 1-yard rush (Cole Smith kick) (9 plays, 75 yards, 4:07)	CIN 10–49
4	00:17	ECU	Rahjai Harris 1-yard rush (Jake Verity kick) (13 plays, 73 yards, 5:17)	CIN 17–49
4	00:10	CIN	Cameron Young 75-yard rush (Cole Smith kick failed) (1 play, 75 yards, 0:07)	CIN 17–55

Statistics	East Carolina	Cincinnati
First downs	23	29
Total yards	293	653
Rushing yards	206	299
Passing yards	87	354
Turnovers	4	1
Time of possession	29:50	30:10

Team	Category	Player	Statistics
East Carolina	Passing	Holton Ahlers	9/20, 87 yards, 3 INTs
East Carolina	Rushing	Keaton Mitchell	17 carries, 124 yards, 1 TD
East Carolina	Receiving	Keaton Mitchell	1 reception, 26 yards
Cincinnati	Passing	Desmond Ridder	24/31, 327 yards, 3 TDs
Cincinnati	Rushing	Desmond Ridder	8 carries, 75 yards, 1 TD
Cincinnati	Receiving	Tre Tucker	4 receptions, 69 yards, 1 TD

=== At Temple ===
East Carolina at Temple

Team	1	2	3	4	Total
• Pirates	7	14	7	0	28
Owls	0	0	3	0	3

- Date: November 21, 2020
- Location: Lincoln Financial Field
  Philadelphia, PA
- Game start: 12:50 p.m. EST
- Elapsed time: 2 hours and 48 minutes
- Game attendance: 100
- Game weather: 64 °F (18 °C) • Weather: Mostly Sunny • Wind: NW 6 MPH
- Referee: Hank Johns
- TV announcers (ESPN+): Dave Leno (play–by–play) and Ken Dunek (analyst)

Scoring summary
1	00:33	ECU	C. J. Johnson 60-yard pass from Holton Ahlers (Jake Verity kick) (1 play, 60 yards, 0:10)	ECU 7–0
2	11:36	TEM	Rory Bell 28-yard field goal (4 plays, 7 yards, 1:13)	ECU 7–3
2	11:22	ECU	Tyler Snead 95-yard kickoff returned (Jake Verity kick) (0 plays, 0 yards, 0:00)	ECU 14–3
2	00:48	ECU	Tyler Snead 46-yard pass from Holton Ahlers (Jake Verity kick) (2 plays, 80 yards, 0:16)	ECU 21–3
4	11:05	ECU	Holton Ahlers 1-yard rush (Jake Verity kick) (4 plays, 90 yards, 1:12)	ECU 28–3

Statistics	East Carolina	Temple
First downs	16	10
Total yards	447	235
Rushing yards	265	140
Passing yards	182	95
Turnovers	2	3
Time of possession	25:06	34:54

Team	Category	Player	Statistics
East Carolina	Passing	Holton Ahlers	11/22, 182 yards, 2 TDs, 1 INT
East Carolina	Rushing	Keaton Mitchell	13 carries, 103 yards
East Carolina	Receiving	C. J. Johnson	3 receptions, 86 yards, 1 TD
Temple	Passing	Kamal Gray	10/21, 95 yards, 2 INTs
Temple	Rushing	Tayvon Ruley	14 carries, 48 yards
Temple	Receiving	David Martin-Robinson	1 reception, 30 yards

=== SMU ===
Southern Methodist at East Carolina

Team	1	2	3	4	Total
Mustangs	7	0	17	14	38
• Pirates	21	24	0	7	52

- Date: November 28, 2020
- Location: Dowdy–Ficklen Stadium
  Greeville, NC
- Game start: 12:05 p.m. EST
- Elapsed time: 3 hours and 31 minutes
- Game attendance: 3,500
- Game weather: 59 °F (15 °C) • Weather: Mostly Clear • Wind: Calm
- Referee: Edwin Lee
- TV announcers (ESPN+): Lincoln Rose (play–by–play) and LaDarrin McLane (analyst)

Scoring summary
1	09:08	ECU	Keaton Mitchell 9-yard rush (Jake Verity kick) (10 plays, 80 yards, 3:46)	ECU 7–0
1	07:07	ECU	Blake Proehl 11-yard pass from Holton Ahlers (Jake Verity kick) (3 plays, 34 yards, 0:59)	ECU 14–0
1	03:27	SMU	Kylen Granson 6-yard pass from Shane Buechele (Chris Naggar kick) (10 plays, 75 yards, 3:40)	ECU 14–7
1	00:00	ECU	Blake Proehl 35-yard pass from Tyler Snead (Jake Verity kick) (8 plays, 75 yards, 0:00)	ECU 21–7
2	11:01	ECU	C. J. Johnson 14-yard pass from Holton Ahlers (Jake Verity kick) (3 plays, 32 yards, 1:00)	ECU 28–7
2	06:16	ECU	Keaton Mitchell 7-yard pass from Holton Ahlers (Jake Verity kick) (7 plays, 60 yards, 3:05)	ECU 35–7
2	04:00	ECU	Tyler Snead 16-yard pass from Holton Ahlers (Jake Verity kick) (4 plays, 30 yards, 0:42)	ECU 42–7
2	00:01	ECU	Jake Verity 29-yard field goal (7 plays, 47 yards, 1:30)	ECU 45–7
3	08:12	SMU	Shane Buechele 1-yard rush (Shane Buechele two-point conversion pass to Rashee Rice) (12 plays, 80 yards, 4:42)	ECU 45–15
3	04:56	SMU	Ulysses Bentley IV 26-yard pass from Shane Buechele (two-point pass conversion attempt failed) (8 plays, 65 yards, 2:13)	ECU 45–21
3	00:00	SMU	Chris Naggar 36-yard field goal (6 plays, 8 yards, 2:37)	ECU 45–24
4	13:15	ECU	Darius Pinnix Jr. 2-yard rush (Jake Verity kick) (5 plays, 75 yards, 1:45)	ECU 52–24
4	07:28	SMU	Tyler Lavine 5-yard rush (Chris Naggar kick) (5 plays, 75 yards, 1:30)	ECU 52–31
4	07:05	SMU	Tyler Lavine 4-yard rush (Chris Naggar kick) (2 plays, 14 yards, 0:23)	ECU 52–38

Statistics	SMU	East Carolina
First downs	26	28
Total yards	384	493
Rushing yards	70	160
Passing yards	314	333
Turnovers	3	2
Time of possession	29:43	30:17

Team	Category	Player	Statistics
SMU	Passing	Shane Buechele	35/50, 314 yards, 2 TDs, 2 INTs
SMU	Rushing	Ulysses Bentley IV	12 carries, 36 yards
SMU	Receiving	Austin Upshaw	8 receptions, 78 yards
East Carolina	Passing	Holton Ahlers	20/29, 298 yards, 4 TDs
East Carolina	Rushing	Keaton Mitchell	20 carries, 68 yards, 1 TD
East Carolina	Receiving	Blake Proehl	6 receptions, 152 yards, 2 TDs

== Players drafted into the NFL ==
Round	Pick	Player	Position	NFL club
4	139	D'Ante Smith	OT	Cincinnati Bengals
