= 2020 Temple Owls football team =

American college football season

2020 Temple Owls football
- Conference: American Athletic Conference
- Record: 1–6 (1–6 The American)
- Head coach: Rod Carey (2nd season)
- Offensive coordinator: Mike Uremovich (2nd season)
- Offensive scheme: Multiple
- Defensive coordinator: Jeff Knowles (2nd season)
- Base defense: 3–4
- Home stadium: Lincoln Financial Field

2020 American Athletic Conference football standings
	Conf.			Overall
Team	W		L	W		L
No. 8 Cincinnati y$	6	–	0	9	–	1
Tulsa y	6	–	0	6	–	3
Memphis	5	–	3	8	–	3
UCF	5	–	3	6	–	4
SMU	4	–	3	7	–	3
Houston	3	–	3	3	–	5
Navy	3	–	4	3	–	7
Tulane	3	–	5	6	–	6
East Carolina	3	–	5	3	–	6
Temple	1	–	6	1	–	6
South Florida	0	–	7	1	–	8
Championship: Cincinnati 27, Tulsa 24
$ – Conference champion; y – Championship game participant; Rankings from AP Poll.

The 2020 Temple Owls football team represented Temple University during the 2020 NCAA Division I FBS football season. The Owls were led by second-year head coach Rod Carey and played their home games at Lincoln Financial Field, competing as a member of the American Athletic Conference (AAC).

== Schedule ==
Temple had games scheduled against Miami, Rutgers, UMass and Idaho which were canceled due to the COVID-19 pandemic.

The game between Temple and Cincinnati, scheduled for November 28, was canceled due to COVID-19 outbreaks at both schools. The game will not be rescheduled, be declared a no contest and both teams will have a bye.

Date	Time	Opponent	Site	TV	Result	Attendance
October 10	6:00 p.m.	at Navy	Navy–Marine Corps Memorial Stadium; Annapolis, MD	CBSSN	L 29–31	4,400
October 17	12:00 p.m.	South Florida	Lincoln Financial Field; Philadelphia, PA	ESPN+	W 39–37	782
October 24	12:00 p.m.	at Memphis	Liberty Bowl Memorial Stadium; Memphis, TN	ESPN+	L 29–41	10,321
October 31	12:00 p.m.	at Tulane	Yulman Stadium; New Orleans, LA	ESPN+	L 3–38	1,200
November 7	12:00 p.m.	No. 18 SMU	Lincoln Financial Field; Philadelphia, PA	ESPN+	L 23–47	2,577
November 14	7:30 p.m.	at UCF	Bounce House; Orlando, FL	ESPNU	L 13–38	8,768
November 21	12:00 p.m.	East Carolina	Lincoln Financial Field; Philadelphia, PA	ESPN+	L 3–28	0
Rankings from AP Poll and CFP Rankings after November 24 released prior to game; All times are in Eastern time

Schedule source:

== Game summaries ==
=== At Navy ===
Temple at Navy

Team	1	2	3	4	Total
Owls	0	10	7	12	29
• Midshipmen	7	14	7	3	31

- Date: October 10, 2020
- Location: Navy–Marine Corps Memorial Stadium
  Annapolis, MD
- Game start: 6:02 p.m. EDT
- Elapsed time: 3 hours and 3 minutes
- Game attendance: 4,400
- Game weather: 71 °F (22 °C) • Weather: Overcast, Slight Wind • Wind: S 5–10 MPH
- Referee: Tim Rich
- TV announcers (CBS Sports Network): John Sadak (play–by–play), Randy Cross (analyst), and Sheehan Stanwick Burch (sideline reporter)

Scoring summary
1	05:22	NAVY	Jamale Carothers 1-yard rush (Bijan Nichols kick) (17 plays, 75 yards, 9:38)	NAVY 7–0
2	14:23	TEM	Will Mobley 25-yard field goal (15 plays, 75 yards, 5:59)	NAVY 7–3
2	10:18	NAVY	Chance Warren 2-yard rush (Bijan Nichols kick) (8 plays, 57 yards, 4:05)	NAVY 14–3
2	07:54	TEM	Anthony Russo 1-yard rush (Will Mobley kick) (8 plays, 78 yards, 2:24)	NAVY 14–10
2	03:46	NAVY	Nelson Smith 26-yard rush (Bijan Nichols kick) (8 plays, 65 yards, 4:08)	NAVY 21–10
3	05:43	TEM	Branden Mack 7-yard pass from Anthony Russo (Will Mobley kick) (10 plays, 70 yards, 4:44)	NAVY 21–17
3	01:09	NAVY	Nelson Smith 22-yard rush (Bijan Nichols kick) (9 plays, 75 yards, 4:34)	NAVY 28–17
4	14:02	TEM	Anthony Russo 9-yard rush (two-point conversion pass attempt failed) (6 plays, 75 yards, 2:07)	NAVY 28–23
4	04:56	NAVY	Bijan Nichols 50-yard field goal (15 plays, 26 yards, 9:06)	NAVY 31–23
4	01:02	TEM	Re'Mahn Davis 1-yard rush (two-point pass conversion attempt failed) (10 plays, 75 yards, 3:54)	NAVY 31–29

Statistics	Temple	Navy
First downs	25	18
Total yards	407	299
Rushing yards	166	251
Passing yards	241	48
Turnovers	1	0
Time of possession	24:39	35:21

Team	Category	Player	Statistics
Temple	Passing	Anthony Russo	21/30, 206 yards, 1 TD, 1 INT
Temple	Rushing	Re'Mahn Davis	23 carries, 97 yards, 1 TD
Temple	Receiving	Branden Mack	7 receptions, 80 yards, 1 TD
Navy	Passing	Dalen Morris	2/2, 48 yards
Navy	Rushing	Nelson Smith	20 carries, 120 yards, 2 TDs
Navy	Receiving	CJ Williams	1 reception, 36 yards

=== South Florida ===
South Florida at Temple

Team	1	2	3	4	Total
Bulls	7	14	10	6	37
• Owls	10	7	9	13	39

- Date: October 17, 2020
- Location: Lincoln Financial Field
  Philadelphia, PA
- Game start: 12:05 p.m. EDT
- Elapsed time: 3 hours and 32 minutes
- Game attendance: 782
- Game weather: 55 °F (13 °C) • Weather: Sunny • Wind: NNW 9 MPH
- Referee: Luke Richmond
- TV announcers (ESPN+): Dave Leno (play–by–play) and Ken Dunek (analyst)

Scoring summary
1	10:10	TEM	Jadan Blue 5-yard pass from Anthony Russo (Will Mobley kick) (8 plays, 50 yards, 2:57)	TEM 7–0
1	08:26	TEM	Will Mobley 24-yard field goal (4 plays, 5 yards, 1:10)	TEM 10–0
1	04:34	USF	Randall St. Felix 13-yard pass from Jordan McCloud (Jared Sackett kick) (10 plays, 49 yards, 3:44)	TEM 10–7
2	09:39	USF	DeVontres Dukes 28-yard pass from Jordan McCloud (Jared Sackett kick) (10 plays, 95 yards, 3:20)	USF 14–10
2	05:16	TEM	Jadan Blue 13-yard pass from Anthony Russo (Will Mobley kick) (11 plays, 73 yards, 4:17)	TEM 17–14
2	01:18	USF	Noah Johnson 2-yard rush (Jared Sackett kick) (4 plays, 35 yards, 0:59)	USF 21–17
3	08:14	TEM	Will Mobley 26-yard field goal (16 plays, 66 yards, 6:46)	USF 21–20
3	05:39	USF	Johnny Ford 13-yard pass from Jordan McCloud (Jared Sackett kick) (8 plays, 46 yards, 2:24)	USF 28–20
3	03:16	USF	Jared Sackett 29-yard field goal (4 plays, −2 yards, 1:01)	USF 31–20
3	01:07	TEM	Branden Mack 12-yard pass from Anthony Russo (two-point conversion pass attempt failed) (7 plays, 57 yards, 2:09)	USF 31–26
4	09:52	TEM	Arnold Ebiketie 11-yard fumble returned (two-point conversion rush attempt failed) (4 plays, 8 yards, 1:37)	TEM 32–31
4	04:28	TEM	Randle Jones 13-yard pass from Anthony Russo (Will Mobley kick) (11 plays, 81 yards, 3:47)	TEM 39–31
4	01:03	USF	Leonard Parker 1-yard rush (two-point conversion rush attempt failed) (12 plays, 72 yards, 3:21)	TEM 39–37

Statistics	South Florida	Temple
First downs	21	32
Total yards	324	416
Rushing yards	143	146
Passing yards	181	270
Turnovers	3	2
Time of possession	27:39	32:21

Team	Category	Player	Statistics
South Florida	Passing	Jordan McCloud	15/26, 182 yards, 3 TDs
South Florida	Rushing	Johnny Ford	15 carries, 68 yards
South Florida	Receiving	Omarion Dollison	4 receptions, 64 yards
Temple	Passing	Anthony Russo	30/42, 270 yards, 4 TDs, 2 INTs
Temple	Rushing	Re'Mahn Davis	25 carries, 83 yards
Temple	Receiving	Randle Jones	8 receptions, 81 yards, 1 TD

=== At Memphis ===
Temple at Memphis

Team	1	2	3	4	Total
Owls	3	12	7	7	29
• Tigers	7	3	17	14	41

- Date: October 24, 2020
- Location: Liberty Bowl Memorial Stadium
  Memphis, TN
- Game start: 12:05 p.m. EDT
- Elapsed time: 3 hours and 36 minutes
- Game attendance: 10,321
- Game weather: 50 °F (10 °C) • Weather: Overcast • Wind: NNE 12 MPH
- Referee: A Calabrase
- TV announcers (ESPN+): Lincoln Rose (play–by–play) and Keith Moreland (analyst)

Scoring summary
1	05:29	MEM	Tahj Washington 3-yard pass from Brady White (Riley Patterson kick) (11 plays, 80 yards, 3:21)	MEM 7–0
1	01:42	TEM	Will Mobley 25-yard field goal (4 plays, 2 yards, 1:22)	MEM 7–3
2	07:41	TEM	Jadan Blue 5-yard pass from Anthony Russo (Will Mobley PAT blocked) (8 plays, 65 yards, 2:49)	TEM 9–7
2	03:34	MEM	Riley Patterson 42-yard field goal (4 plays, 1 yard, 1:20)	MEM 10–9
2	00:31	TEM	Branden Mack 10-yard pass from Anthony Russo (two-point conversion pass attempt failed) (12 plays, 75 yards, 3:03)	TEM 15–10
3	08:40	MEM	Riley Patterson 42-yard field goal (13 plays, 47 yards, 6:15)	TEM 15–13
3	07:52	MEM	Calvin Austin 65-yard pass from Brady White (Riley Patterson kick) (2 plays, 66 yards, 0:40)	MEM 20–15
3	06:30	MEM	Tahj Washington 26-yard pass from Brady White (Riley Patterson kick) (2 plays, 54 yards, 0:45)	MEM 27–15
3	02:37	TEM	Jadan Blue 32-yard pass from Anthony Russo (Will Mobley kick) (8 plays, 78 yards, 3:48)	MEM 27–22
4	12:02	MEM	Javon Ivory 7-yard pass from Brady White (Riley Patterson kick) (9 plays, 45 yards, 3:09)	MEM 34–22
4	10:11	TEM	Jadan Blue 8-yard pass from Anthony Russo (Will Mobley kick) (7 plays, 75 yards, 1:51)	MEM 34–29
4	02:15	MEM	Kylan Watkins 15-yard rush (Riley Patterson kick) (8 plays, 88 yards, 2:52)	MEM 41–29

Statistics	Temple	Memphis
First downs	30	24
Total yards	500	489
Rushing yards	113	176
Passing yards	387	313
Turnovers	4	3
Time of possession	33:28	26:32

Team	Category	Player	Statistics
Temple	Passing	Anthony Russo	41/63, 387 yards, 4 TDs, 3 INTs
Temple	Rushing	Re'Mahn Davis	20 carries, 113 yards
Temple	Receiving	Randle Jones	12 receptions, 118 yards
Memphis	Passing	Brady White	17/36, 313 yards, 4 TDs, 1 INT
Memphis	Rushing	Rodrigues Clark	22 carries, 106 yards
Memphis	Receiving	Calvin Austin	6 receptions, 184 yards, 1 TD

=== At Tulane ===
Temple at Tulane

Team	1	2	3	4	Total
Owls	3	0	0	0	3
• Green Wave	0	10	14	14	38

- Date: October 31, 2020
- Location: Yulman Stadium
  New Orleans, LA
- Game start: 12:05 p.m. EDT
- Elapsed time: 3 hours
- Game attendance: 1,200
- Game weather: 61 °F (16 °C) • Weather: Fair • Wind: NE 5 MPH
- Referee: Henry Johns
- TV announcers (ESPN+): Lincoln Rose (play–by–play) and Keith Moreland (analyst)

Scoring summary
1	10:37	TEM	Rory Bell 22-yard field goal (8 plays, 54 yards, 3:17)	TEM 3–0
2	11:55	TULN	Merek Glover 40-yard field goal (10 plays, 67 yards, 4:12)	TIE 3–3
2	06:50	TULN	Cameron Carroll 13-yard rush (Merek Glover kick) (6 plays, 93 yards, 2:27)	TULN 10–3
3	05:36	TULN	Deuce Watts 31-yard pass from Michael Pratt (Merek Glover kick) (6 plays, 65 yards, 2:27)	TULN 17–3
3	01:43	TULN	Deuce Watts 5-yard pass from Michael Pratt (Merek Glover kick) (5 plays, 30 yards, 2:32)	TULN 24–3
4	12:01	TULN	Michael Pratt 9-yard rush (Merek Glover kick) (3 plays, 40 yards, 1:15)	TULN 31–3
4	03:53	TULN	Jaetavian Toles 15-yard pass from Keon Howard (Merek Glover kick) (10 plays, 55 yards, 6:05)	TULN 38–3

Statistics	Temple	Tulane
First downs	11	28
Total yards	222	504
Rushing yards	77	284
Passing yards	145	220
Turnovers	1	3
Time of possession	28:15	31:45

Team	Category	Player	Statistics
Temple	Passing	Trad Beatty	11/18, 122 yards, 1 INT
Temple	Rushing	Re-al Mitchell	7 carries, 37 yards
Temple	Receiving	Branden Mack	3 receptions, 54 yards
Tulane	Passing	Michael Pratt	12/21, 205 yards, 2 TDs, 1 INT
Tulane	Rushing	Amare Jones	12 carries, 92 yards
Tulane	Receiving	Duece Watts	5 receptions, 114 yards, 2 TDs

=== SMU ===
Southern Methodist at Temple

Team	1	2	3	4	Total
• No. 18 Mustangs	7	3	10	27	47
Owls	13	0	3	7	23

- Date: November 5, 2020
- Location: Lincoln Financial Field
  Philadelphia, PA
- Game start: 12:05 p.m. EST
- Elapsed time: 3 hours and 11 minutes
- Game attendance: 2,577
- Game weather: 70 °F (21 °C) • Weather: Sunny • Wind: 5MPH
- Referee: Charles Lamertina
- TV announcers (ESPN+): Dave Leno (play–by–play) and Ken Dunek (analyst)

Scoring summary
1	14:47	TEM	Randle Jones 75-yard pass from Tad Beatty (Rory Bell PAT failed) (1 play, 75 yards, 0:13)	TEM 6–0
1	11:10	SMU	Tyler Page 24-yard pass from Shane Buechele (Chris Naggar kick) (10 plays, 85 yards, 3:31)	SMU 7–6
1	01:32	TEM	Tayvon Ruley 3-yard rush (Rory Bell kick) (11 plays, 61 yards, 5:45)	TEM 13–7
2	03:41	SMU	Chris Naggar 40-yard field goal (14 plays, 45 yards, 5:32)	TEM 13–10
3	12:58	SMU	Tyler Page 44-yard pass from Shane Buechele (Chris Naggar kick) (5 plays, 65 yards, 2:02)	SMU 17–13
3	08:36	SMU	Chris Naggar 27-yard field goal (9 plays, 55 yards, 2:26)	SMU 20–13
3	01:14	TEM	Rory Bell 26-yard field goal (15 plays, 67 yards, 7:22)	SMU 20–16
4	14:54	SMU	Kylen Granson 24-yard pass from Shane Buechele (Chris Naggar PAT failed) (5 plays, 75 yards, 1:20)	SMU 26–16
4	12:42	SMU	Tyler Lavine 2-yard rush (Chris Naggar kick) (3 plays, 34 yards, 0:54)	SMU 33–16
4	09:17	SMU	Rashee Rice 33-yard pass from Shane Buechele (Chris Naggar kick) (5 plays, 81 yards, 2:31)	SMU 40–16
4	07:32	SMU	TaMerik Williams 49-yard rush (Chris Naggar kick) (1 play, 49 yards, 0:09)	SMU 47–16
4	00:35	TEM	Aaron Jarman 11-yard pass from Re–al Michell (Rory Bell kick) (15 plays, 75 yards, 6:57)	SMU 47–23

Statistics	SMU	Temple
First downs	24	19
Total yards	549	368
Rushing yards	194	157
Passing yards	355	211
Turnovers	0	0
Time of possession	24:55	35:05

Team	Category	Player	Statistics
SMU	Passing	Shane Buechele	24/35, 355 yards, 4 TDs
SMU	Rushing	Ulysses Bentley IV	17 carries, 79 yards
SMU	Receiving	Kylen Granson	6 receptions, 149 yards, 1 TD
Temple	Passing	Ted Beatty	6/9, 108 yards, 1 TD
Temple	Rushing	Tayvon Ruley	15 carries, 66 yards, 1 TD
Temple	Receiving	Randle Jones	2 receptions, 86 yards, 1 TD

=== At UCF ===
Temple at Central Florida

Team	1	2	3	4	Total
Owls	0	3	0	10	13
• Knights	21	0	17	0	38

- Date: November 14, 2020
- Location: Bounce House
  Orlando, FL
- Game start: 7:30 p.m. EST
- Elapsed time: 3 hours and 27 minutes
- Game attendance: 8,768
- Game weather: 73 °F (23 °C) • Weather: Mostly Cloudy • Wind: NE 8 MPH
- TV announcers (ESPNU): Mike Corey (play–by–play) and Hutson Mason (analyst)

Scoring summary
1	13:00	UCF	Greg McCrae 7-yard rush (Daniel Obarski kick) (4 plays, 22 yards, 1:05)	UCF 7–0
1	10:19	UCF	Otis Anderson 14-yard rush (Daniel Obarski kick) (3 plays, 27 yards, 0:35)	UCF 14–0
1	06:51	UCF	Greg McCrae 1-yard rush (Daniel Obarski kick) (7 plays, 65 yards, 1:48)	UCF 21–0
2	14:20	TEM	Rory Bell 30-yard field goal (9 plays, 46 yards, 4:00)	UCF 21–3
3	13:12	UCF	Marlon Williams 23-yard pass from Dillon Gabriel (Daniel Obarski kick) (5 plays, 45 yards, 1:39)	UCF 28–3
3	07:21	UCF	Daniel Obarski 25-yard field goal (9 plays, 72 yards, 2:33)	UCF 31–3
3	03:59	UCF	Marlon Williams 21-yard pass from Dillon Gabriel (Daniel Obarski kick) (2 plays, 91 yards, 0:27)	UCF 38–3
4	14:24	TEM	Onasis Neely 5-yard rush (Rory Bell kick) (3 plays, 12 yards, 1:15)	UCF 38–10
4	07:59	TEM	Rory Bell 24-yard field goal (10 plays, 59 yards, 4:45)	UCF 38–13

Statistics	Temple	UCF
First downs	19	19
Total yards	290	419
Rushing yards	183	147
Passing yards	107	272
Turnovers	3	1
Time of possession	37:13	22:47

Team	Category	Player	Statistics
Temple	Passing	Re–al Mitchell	10/23, 107 yards, 2 INTs
Temple	Rushing	Tayvon Ruley	23 carries, 90 yards
Temple	Receiving	Jadan Blue	5 receptions, 71 yards
UCF	Passing	Dillon Gabriel	12/22, 268 yards, 2 TDs
UCF	Rushing	Otis Anderson Jr.	10 carries, 83 yards, 1 TD
UCF	Receiving	Jaylon Robinson	4 receptions, 113 yards

=== East Carolina ===
East Carolina at Temple

Team	1	2	3	4	Total
• Pirates	7	14	7	0	28
Owls	0	0	3	0	3

- Date: November 21, 2020
- Location: Lincoln Financial Field
  Philadelphia, PA
- Game start: 12:50 p.m. EST
- Elapsed time: 2 hours and 48 minutes
- Game attendance: 100
- Game weather: 64 °F (18 °C) • Weather: Mostly Sunny • Wind: NW 6 MPH
- Referee: Hank Johns
- TV announcers (ESPN+): Dave Leno (play–by–play) and Ken Dunek (analyst)

Scoring summary
1	00:33	ECU	C. J. Johnson 60-yard pass from Holton Ahlers (Jake Verity kick) (1 play, 60 yards, 0:10)	ECU 7–0
2	11:36	TEM	Rory Bell 28-yard field goal (4 plays, 7 yards, 1:13)	ECU 7–3
2	11:22	ECU	Tyler Snead 95-yard kickoff returned (Jake Verity kick) (0 plays, 0 yards, 0:00)	ECU 14–3
2	00:48	ECU	Tyler Snead 46-yard pass from Holton Ahlers (Jake Verity kick) (2 plays, 80 yards, 0:16)	ECU 21–3
4	11:05	ECU	Holton Ahlers 1-yard rush (Jake Verity kick) (4 plays, 90 yards, 1:12)	ECU 28–3

Statistics	East Carolina	Temple
First downs	16	10
Total yards	447	235
Rushing yards	265	140
Passing yards	182	95
Turnovers	2	3
Time of possession	25:06	34:54

Team	Category	Player	Statistics
East Carolina	Passing	Holton Ahlers	11/22, 182 yards, 2 TDs, 1 INT
East Carolina	Rushing	Keaton Mitchell	13 carries, 103 yards
East Carolina	Receiving	C. J. Johnson	3 receptions, 86 yards, 1 TD
Temple	Passing	Kamal Gray	10/21, 95 yards, 2 INTs
Temple	Rushing	Tayvon Ruley	14 carries, 48 yards
Temple	Receiving	David Martin-Robinson	1 reception, 30 yards
