= Rashee Rice =

American football player (born 2000)

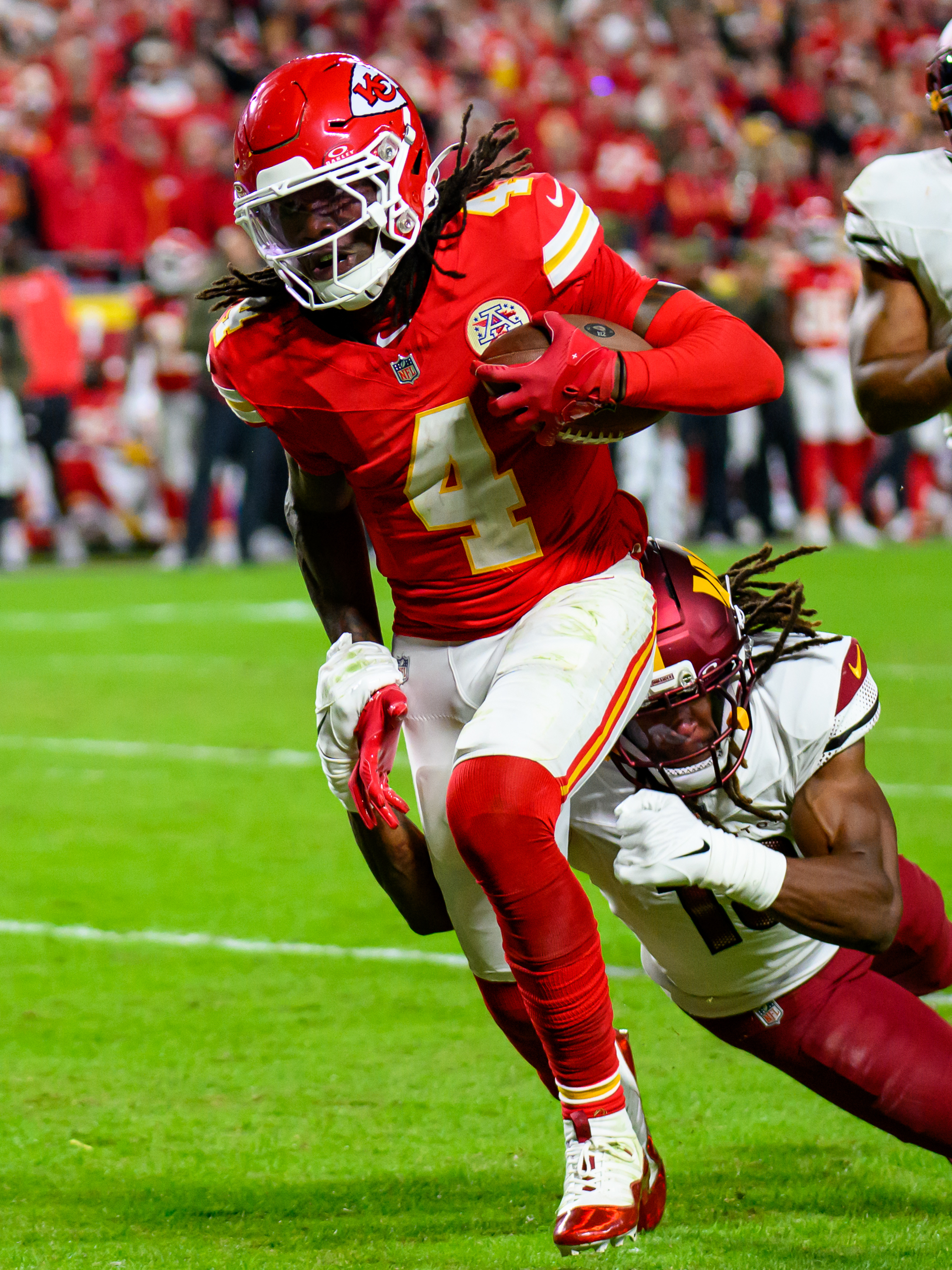
- Rice with the Kansas City Chiefs in 2025

No. 4 – Kansas City Chiefs
- Position: Wide receiver
- Roster status: Active

Personal information
- Born: April 22, 2000 (age 26); Philadelphia, Pennsylvania, U.S.
- Listed height: 6 ft 1 in (1.85 m)
- Listed weight: 204 lb (93 kg)

Career information
- High school: Richland (North Richland Hills, Texas)
- College: SMU (2019–2022)
- NFL draft: 2023: 2nd round, 55th overall pick

Career history
- Kansas City Chiefs (2023–present)

Awards and highlights
- Super Bowl champion (LVIII); First-team All-AAC (2022); NFL records: Most post season receptions by a rookie: 26 (2023)

Career NFL statistics as of Week 10, 2026
- Receptions: 186
- Receiving yards: 2,171
- Receiving touchdowns: 16
- Rushing yards: 18
- Rushing touchdowns: 1
- Stats at Pro Football Reference

Rashee Marquan Rice (born April 22, 2000) is an American professional football wide receiver for the Kansas City Chiefs of the National Football League (NFL). He played college football for the Southern Methodist University Mustangs. He was selected by the Chiefs in the second round of the 2023 NFL draft and won Super Bowl LVIII as a rookie. Rice also set the NFL record for the most postseason receptions by a rookie, hauling in 26 passes during the Chiefs' Super Bowl run in the 2023–24 playoffs, surpassing Ja'Marr Chase's 25 catches from the 2021–22 playoffs.

In July 2025, Rice pleaded guilty to two third-degree felonies for his involvement in a March 2024 hit-and-run street racing crash in Dallas. He was sentenced to 30 days of jail time and five years of probation. The court granted him flexibility to serve the jail time at any point during his probation period, which means he can delay it as long as he remains compliant. He was suspended for the first six games of the 2025 season.

== Early life ==
Rice was born in Philadelphia, Pennsylvania, but grew up in North Richland Hills, Texas, and attended Richland High School. As a junior, he caught 72 passes for 1,386 yards and 19 touchdowns and was named first team all-district. Rice was rated a three-star recruit and committed to play college football at Southern Methodist University (SMU) entering his senior year. Constantly double teamed his senior season, Rice finished his final high school season with a modest 51 receptions for 841 yards and five touchdowns.

== College career ==
Rice played in ten games as a freshman and had 25 receptions for 403 yards and one touchdown. He became a starter during his sophomore season and caught 48 passes for 683 yards and five touchdowns. Rice had 64 receptions for 670 yards and nine touchdowns and was named honorable mention All-American Athletic Conference (AAC) as a junior. In the 2022 season, he had 96 receptions for 1,355 receiving yards and ten receiving touchdowns. He had six games on the year going over 100 receiving yards.

== Professional career ==
Pre-draft measurables
Height	Weight	Arm length	Hand span	Wingspan	40-yard dash	10-yard split	20-yard split	20-yard shuttle	Three-cone drill	Vertical jump	Broad jump
6 ft 0 5/8 in (1.84 m)	204 lb (93 kg)	32 3/4 in (0.83 m)	9 1/2 in (0.24 m)	6 ft 5 3/8 in (1.97 m)	4.51 s	1.49 s	2.54 s	4.23 s	7.02 s	41.0 in (1.04 m)	10 ft 8 in (3.25 m)
All values from NFL Combine/Pro Day

=== Kansas City Chiefs ===
Rice was selected by the Kansas City Chiefs in the second round (55th overall) of the 2023 NFL draft.

==== 2023 ====
In Rice's professional debut in Week 1 against the Detroit Lions, he scored his first career touchdown in a loss. He achieved his first 100 yard receiving game in Week 12 against the Las Vegas Raiders. In Week 15 against the New England Patriots, he broke the Chiefs rookie receiving touchdowns record. In Week 17 against the Bengals, he had five receptions for 127 yards in the 25–17 win. In the Wild Card Round of the playoffs, Rice had eight receptions for 130 yards and a touchdown in the 26–7 win over the Dolphins. The Chiefs reached Super Bowl LVIII in Rice's rookie season, in which Rice caught six passes for 39 yards in a 25–22 victory over the San Francisco 49ers. Rice broke the NFL postseason rookie receptions record, catching 26 passes, one more than previous record-holder Cincinnati Bengals' Ja'Marr Chase two years prior.

==== 2024 ====
Rice opened the 2024 season with seven receptions for 103 yards in the 27–20 victory over the Baltimore Ravens in Week 1. In Week 4 against the Los Angeles Chargers, Rice left the game with a knee injury after Quarterback Patrick Mahomes collided with him. The Chiefs placed Rice on injured reserve on October 3, 2024. On October 8, Rice underwent surgery to repair his LCL and hamstring, and was expected to make a full recovery but to miss the rest of the season. Without Rice, the Chiefs reached Super Bowl LIX but lost 40-22 to the Philadelphia Eagles.

==== 2025 ====
On August 27, 2025, the NFL announced Rice would be suspended for the first six games of the 2025 season for his criminal convictions. The NFL initially proposed a suspension of ten games or more, but there was no precedent for a suspension of this length, and the agreement for a six-game suspension was reached after pushback from Rice and the NFL Players Association. According to the NFL, the judge allowed him to choose when to serve his sentence, but it remained unclear when this would occur. On October 15, Rice's suspension ended and he returned to practice; the October 19 game against the Las Vegas Raiders was expected to be the first game of the season with all three Chiefs wide receivers active. In eight appearances for Kansas City, he logged 53 receptions for 571 yards and five touchdowns. On December 24, Rice was placed on season-ending injured reserve due to lingering concussion symptoms.

==== 2026 ====
On May 19, 2026, it was reported that Rice had undergone a cleanup surgery on his right knee, sidelining him for two months. This was further complicated by Rice's violation of his probation that resulted in him being ordered to serve 30 days in jail, preventing him from receiving proper medical attention.

== Career statistics ==
=== NFL ===
Legend
Won the Super Bowl

==== Regular season ====
Year	Team	Games		Receiving					Fumbles	
Year	Team	GP	GS	Rec	Yds	Avg	Lng	TD	Fum	Lost
2023	KC	16	8	79	938	11.9	67	7	2	1
2024	KC	4	4	24	288	12.0	44	2	0	0
2025	KC	8	8	53	571	10.8	47	5	2	0
2026	KC	7	6	30	374	12.5	50	2	0	0
Career		35	26	186	2,171	11.7	67	16	4	1

==== Postseason ====
Year	Team	Games		Receiving					Fumbles	
Year	Team	GP	GS	Rec	Yds	Avg	Lng	TD	Fum	Lost
2023	KC	4	4	26	262	10.1	39	1	2	0
Career		4	4	26	262	10.1	39	1	2	0

=== College ===
Year	G	Receiving			
Year	G	Rec	Yds	Avg	TD
2019	10	25	403	16.1	1
2020	10	48	683	14.2	5
2021	12	64	670	10.5	9
2022	12	96	1,355	14.1	10
Career	44	233	3,111	13.4	25

== Legal issues ==
On March 30, 2024, Rice was the driver of a Lamborghini Urus involved in a high-speed hit-and-run crash on North Central Expressway in Dallas, together with a Chevrolet Corvette he was leasing. Four other vehicles were damaged in what Dallas police called a "chain reaction collision" after the Lamborghini struck a retaining wall. Video obtained by The Dallas Morning News shows five men disembarking from the Urus and the Corvette and leaving the scene on foot without checking on the occupants of the other four vehicles. Two of those occupants were transported to a hospital, and two others were treated for minor injuries at the scene.

On April 3, Rice met with Dallas police, and in a statement sent to the Morning News, he said that he takes "full responsibility" for his part in the collision. His attorney Royce West said Rice "is cooperating with local authorities and will take all necessary steps to address this situation responsibly." On April 4, West confirmed that Rice had been driving the Lamborghini.

On April 10, Dallas police issued an arrest warrant for Rice and announced that he had been charged with one count of aggravated assault, one count of collision involving serious bodily injury, and six counts of collision involving injuries. The Corvette driver was identified and faced the same charges. Rice turned himself in to Glenn Heights police the following day and was briefly jailed in DeSoto. Rice also faced a $1 million lawsuit from injuries caused by the crash.

On May 7, 2024, Dallas police announced that Rice was under investigation for allegedly punching a photographer at a downtown Dallas club. Rice was not arrested or charged with a crime. On May 21, Dallas police said that the victim declined to press charges.

In a July 17, 2025, plea bargain stemming from the Dallas car crash, Rice pleaded guilty to two third-degree felonies: one count of collision involving serious bodily injury and one count of racing on a highway causing bodily injury. West said that all additional charges were dismissed. A Dallas County judge sentenced Rice to five years of probation and 30 days of jail time and ordered him to pay $115,481.91 to the victims for out-of-pocket medical expenses. No determination was made regarding when he would serve his jail sentence. That same week, Rice agreed to settle a lawsuit filed by two crash victims, agreeing to pay $1 million plus their legal expenses, but he still faced a lawsuit from another victim seeking $250,000 to $1 million in damages.

On May 19, 2026, it was reported that Rice had tested positive for THC, violating his probation. He was subsequently ordered to serve 30 days in a Dallas County jail.

On November 5, 2026, it was reported that Rice had filed for Chapter 7 bankruptcy with claims that he owes over $3.45 million in debts.
