= Blake Proehl =

American football player (born 1999)

Profile
- Position: Wide receiver

Personal information
- Born: January 12, 1999 (age 27); Greensboro, North Carolina, U.S.
- Listed height: 6 ft 1 in (1.85 m)
- Listed weight: 190 lb (86 kg)

Career information
- High school: Providence (Charlotte, North Carolina)
- College: East Carolina (2017–2020)
- NFL draft: 2021: undrafted

Career history
- Minnesota Vikings (2021–2022)
- Stats at Pro Football Reference

Christian Blake Proehl (born January 12, 1999) is a music recording artist and was an American professional football wide receiver. He played college football at East Carolina and the Minnesota Vikings.

== Early life ==
Proehl was born in Greensboro, North Carolina and grew up in Charlotte, North Carolina, where he attended Providence High School. As a senior, he caught 52 passes for 1,016 yards and 12 touchdowns and was named first-team All-SoMeck 8 Conference.

== College career ==
Proehl was a member of the East Carolina Pirates for four seasons. He used a medical redshirt as a true freshman after suffering a season-ending injury at the beginning of preseason training camp. As a junior, Proehl caught 47 passes for 577 yards and four touchdowns. After his junior season, Proehl announced that he would forgo his final year at East Carolina to enter the 2021 NFL Draft.

== Professional career ==
Pre-draft measurables
| Height | Weight | Arm length | Hand span | 40-yard dash | 10-yard split | 20-yard split | 20-yard shuttle | Three-cone drill | Vertical jump | Broad jump | Bench press |
|---|---|---|---|---|---|---|---|---|---|---|---|
| 6 ft 1 7/8 in (1.88 m) | 186 lb (84 kg) | 31 1/2 in (0.80 m) | 9 in (0.23 m) | 4.47 s | 1.55 s | 2.53 s | 4.20 s | 7.00 s | 36.0 in (0.91 m) | 10 ft 6 in (3.20 m) | 12 reps |
All values from Pro Day

Proehl signed with the Minnesota Vikings as an undrafted free agent shortly after the conclusion of the 2021 NFL draft. He was waived/injured on August 16 and placed on injured reserve.

On August 23, 2022, Proehl was placed on the reserve/PUP list to start the season. He was activated on October 17, then waived and re-signed to the practice squad. He signed a reserve/future contract on January 16, 2023. He was waived on August 29, 2023.

== Music career ==
While rehabilitating his knee injury in 2021, Proehl rediscovered his love for music and posted a video of himself singing for his Grandma which went viral. In March 2022, he announced his first ever single release titled "Falling Into You," released on March 25, 2022, which was written with a small circle of rising songwriters including Rachel Grae, Spencer Hendricks, Kaitlin Stark, and Austin Zudeck and Justin Thunstrom of Parkwild, who also produced the track. On July 15, 2023, he played his first headline show at Fine Line in Minneapolis, Minnesota.

In 2024, Proehl appeared on the 22nd season of American Idol, and his audition was aired on February 18, successfully advancing to the Hollywood rounds. He later advanced to the Top 24 on April 1, 2024, performing the song "Anyone" by Justin Bieber. He did not advance to the Top 20, but with new found friends from the show, Haven Madison, Kaibrienne and Kayko, they put together the Young And Out of Love Tour, performing in 23 cities throughout the United States.

Proehl has continued to release music independently. His top streaming song, "Crazy Stupid Love", released August 30, 2024, was co-written by Proehl with Chelsea Lena, Fran Hall and Pom Pom and also produced by Pom Pom. On October 17, 2025, he released "Hail Mary", an expression of his personal story: having a dream of playing in the NFL, achieving that dream, but feeling God was pulling you into a new dream and purpose in life. The song was written by Proehl, George Taylor Dubray, John Spencer Jordan and Kaitlin Stark and produced by Todd Tran.

== Personal life ==
Proehl's father, Ricky Proehl, played wide receiver in the NFL for 17 seasons. His brother, Austin, played for the New York Giants but was released on August 16, 2022.
