= Chris Naggar =

American football player (born 1997)

No. 8
- Position: Placekicker

Personal information
- Born: December 9, 1997 (age 28); Arlington, Texas, U.S.
- Listed height: 6 ft 1 in (1.85 m)
- Listed weight: 194 lb (88 kg)

Career information
- High school: Arlington (Arlington, Texas)
- College: Texas (2016–2019); SMU (2020)
- NFL draft: 2021: undrafted

Career history
- New York Jets (2021)*; Cleveland Browns (2021); Dallas Cowboys (2022)*
- * Offseason or practice squad member only

Awards and highlights
- First-team All-AAC (2020); AAC Special Teams Player of the Year (2020)

Career NFL statistics
- Field goals made: 1
- Field goal attempts: 1
- Field goal %: 100
- Longest field goal: 37
- Stats at Pro Football Reference

Christopher Michael Naggar (born December 9, 1997) is an American former professional football player who was a placekicker for the Cleveland Browns of the National Football League (NFL). He played college football for the Texas Longhorns and SMU Mustangs before being signed by the New York Jets as an undrafted free agent in 2021. He played in one game in the NFL for the Browns in 2021.

== Early life and education ==
Naggar was born on December 9, 1997, in Arlington, Texas. He attended Arlington High School before playing college football for the Texas Longhorns. He was named district special teams MVP as a senior in high school. Naggar redshirted his first year at Texas, and did not play in his second. As a junior in 2019, he played seven games at the punter position, making 25 punts for 983 yards with a long of 67 yards, 10 inside the 20 and three of 50+. He changed to kicker in 2020, when he transferred to SMU. As a senior, he was 17-for-21 on field goals, leading his conference in accuracy.

== Professional career ==
=== New York Jets ===
After going unselected in the 2021 NFL draft, Naggar signed a contract as an undrafted free agent with the New York Jets. He was waived on August 16, 2021.

=== Cleveland Browns ===
Naggar was signed to the Cleveland Browns practice squad on September 2, 2021, to compete with Chase McLaughlin. He was promoted to the active roster prior to their week one game against the Kansas City Chiefs, following an injury to McLaughlin. He did not appear on any snaps during the game and was reverted to the practice squad the following day. Naggar was elevated to the active roster again on December 24, 2021, as a COVID-19 replacement player after McLaughlin was placed on the COVID list. Naggar made his NFL debut on Christmas Day for Cleveland's week 16 loss against the Green Bay Packers. In the game, Naggar converted a 37-yard field goal and made 1 out of 2 extra point attempts. Naggar was released from the Browns' practice squad on December 30, 2021.

=== Dallas Cowboys ===
On February 3, 2022, the Dallas Cowboys signed Naggar to a reserve/future contract. On May 13, 2022, he was released by the Cowboys.

In January 2023, he attended a work-out hosted by the Pittsburgh Steelers along with three other kickers and punters.

On October 27, 2023, Naggar became a real estate advisor, ending his playing career.
