= Kylen Granson =

American football player (born 1998)

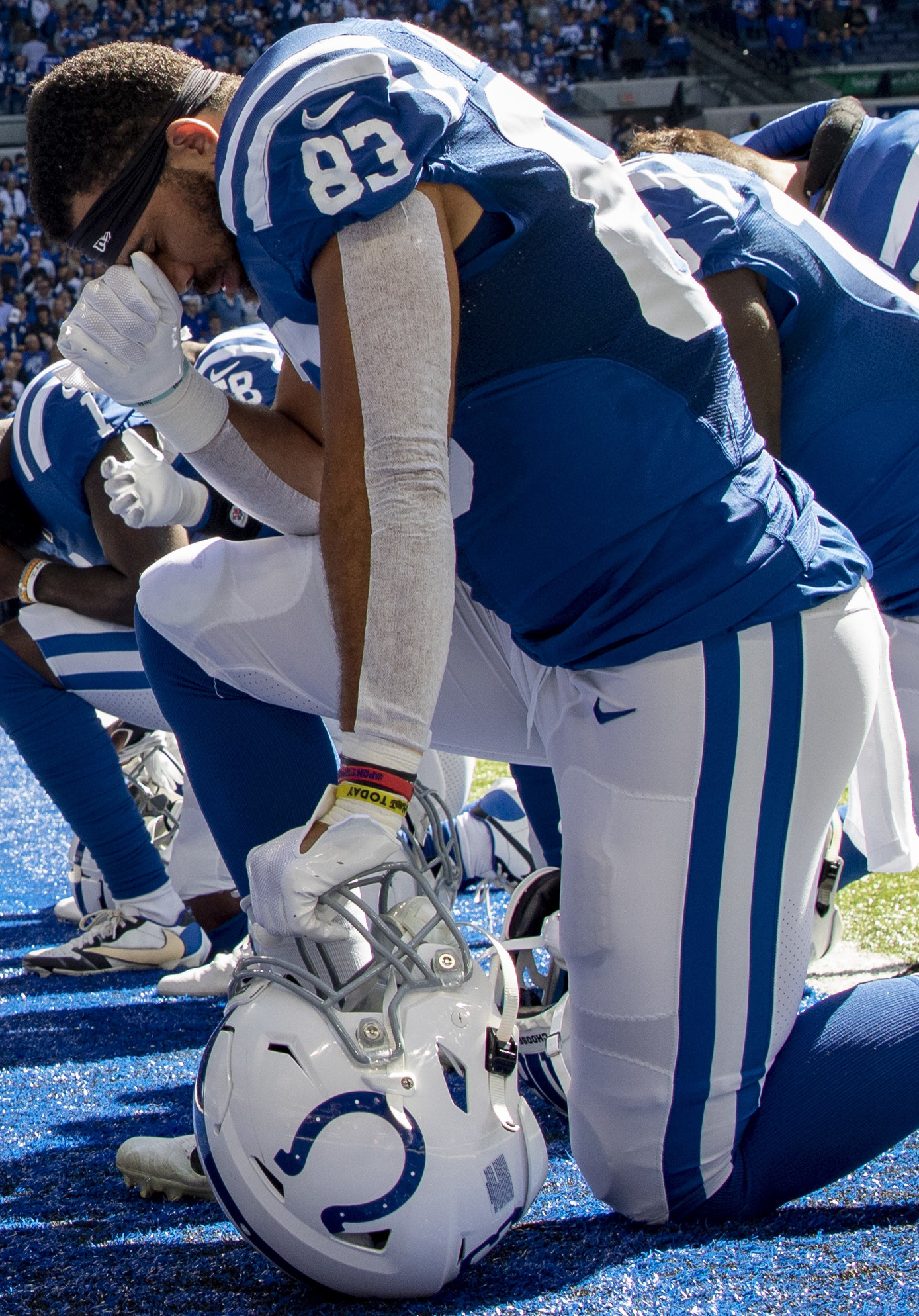
- Granson with the Indianapolis Colts in 2022

No. 86 – Tennessee Titans
- Position: Tight end
- Roster status: Active

Personal information
- Born: March 27, 1998 (age 28); DeMotte, Indiana, U.S.
- Listed height: 6 ft 3 in (1.91 m)
- Listed weight: 242 lb (110 kg)

Career information
- High school: Westlake (Austin, Texas)
- College: Rice (2016–2017); SMU (2018–2020)
- NFL draft: 2021: 4th round, 127th overall pick

Career history
- Indianapolis Colts (2021–2024); Philadelphia Eagles (2025); Tennessee Titans (2026–present)

Awards and highlights
- First-team All-AAC (2020); Second-team All-AAC (2019)

Career NFL statistics as of 2025
- Receptions: 93
- Receiving yards: 998
- Receiving touchdowns: 1
- Stats at Pro Football Reference

Kylen Granson (born March 27, 1998) is an American professional football tight end for the Tennessee Titans of the National Football League (NFL). He played college football for the Rice Owls and SMU Mustangs before being selected by the Indianapolis Colts in the fourth round of the 2021 NFL draft.

== Early life ==
Granson was born in DeMotte, Indiana, and grew up in Austin, Texas, where he attended Westlake High School. Granson was named second-team All-District 14-6A as a senior. He was not heavily recruited and committed to play college football at Rice over an offer from Harvard.

== College career ==
Granson began his collegiate career playing wide receiver for the Rice Owls. As a freshman he caught 33 passes for 381 yards and two touchdowns followed by 18 receptions for 241 yards in his sophomore season. Granson left the program following the firing of Rice head coach David Bailiff and enrolled at Austin Community College, hoping to join the Texas Longhorns as a walk-on. Granson had a chance encounter with Bailiff on the University of Texas campus, who did not know that he had left Rice and began contacting college coaches on Granson's behalf. SMU coach Sonny Dykes offered Granson a spot as a walk-on.

Granson sat out his first season at SMU per NCAA transfer rules and was awarded a scholarship. As a redshirt junior, he caught 43 passes for 721 yards and nine touchdowns and was named second-team All-American Athletic Conference (AAC). He was named first-team All-AAC after finishing his redshirt senior season with 35 receptions for 536 yards and five touchdowns. Granson's 14 touchdown receptions set a new school record for tight ends.

== Professional career ==
Pre-draft measurables
Height	Weight	Arm length	Hand span	Wingspan	40-yard dash	10-yard split	20-yard split	20-yard shuttle	Three-cone drill	Vertical jump	Broad jump	Bench press
6 ft 1 1/2 in (1.87 m)	241 lb (109 kg)	32 5/8 in (0.83 m)	9 3/8 in (0.24 m)	6 ft 5 5/8 in (1.97 m)	4.63 s	1.61 s	2.62 s	4.40 s	6.93 s	36.5 in (0.93 m)	10 ft 0 in (3.05 m)	16 reps
All values from Pro Day

=== Indianapolis Colts ===
Granson was selected by the Indianapolis Colts in the fourth round with the 127th overall pick in the 2021 NFL draft. He signed his four-year rookie contract with Indianapolis on May 19, 2021. As a rookie, Granson recorded 11 receptions for 106 yards in the 2021 season.

==== 2022 season ====
Granson made his first start in Week 2 of the 2022 season against the Jaguars. He finished the 2022 season with 31 receptions for 302 yards.

==== 2023 season ====
Granson scored his first NFL touchdown in September 2023 against the Houston Texans. In the 2023 season, he made seven starts and appeared in 15 games. He finished with 30 receptions for 368 yards and one touchdown.

==== 2024 season ====
Prior to the 2024 season, Granson announced that he would wear a Guardian Cap during the season to try to better protect himself from brain injuries. At the time, he was one of only two Colts players to commit to wearing the device, which other players refused to wear for aesthetic reasons.

=== Philadelphia Eagles ===
On March 20, 2025, Granson signed a one-year contract with the Philadelphia Eagles.

=== Tennessee Titans ===
On March 16, 2026, the Tennessee Titans signed Granson to a one-year contract.

== NFL career statistics ==
Legend
**Bold**	Career high

=== Regular season ===
Year	Team	Games		Receiving					Rushing					Tackles			Fumbles		
Year	Team	GP	GS	Rec	Yds	Avg	Lng	TD	Att	Yds	Avg	Lng	TD	Cmb	Solo	Ast	FR	Fum	Lost
2021	IND	17	0	11	106	9.6	27	0	0	0	0.0	0	0	0	0	0	0	0	0
2022	IND	13	4	**31**	302	9.7	32	0	**1**	0	0.0	0	0	3	3	0	**1**	**1**	0
2023	IND	15	7	30	**368**	12.3	**46**	**1**	**1**	**2**	**2.0**	**2**	0	4	3	1	0	0	0
2024	IND	17	6	14	182	**13.0**	40	0	0	0	0.0	0	0	3	3	0	0	0	0
2025	PHI	17	3	7	40	5.7	12	0	0	0	0.0	0	0	**18**	**9**	**9**	0	0	0
Career		79	20	93	998	10.7	46	1	2	2	1.0	2	0	28	18	10	1	1	0

=== Postseason ===
Year	Team	Games		Receiving					Rushing					Tackles			Fumbles		
Year	Team	GP	GS	Rec	Yds	Avg	Lng	TD	Att	Yds	Avg	Lng	TD	Cmb	Solo	Ast	FR	Fum	Lost
2025	PHI	1	0	0	0	0.0	0	0	0	0	0.0	0	0	0	0	0	0	0	0
Career		1	0	0	0	0.0	0	0	0	0	0.0	0	0	0	0	0	0	0	0

== Personal life ==
Granson married Daisy Foko in a wedding officiated by John Green.

Granson plays the video game Slay the Spire and has appeared on FrostPrime's Twitch stream.
