= Ken Dunek =

American football player (born 1957)

No. 86
- Position: Tight end

Personal information
- Born: June 20, 1957 (age 69); Chicago, Illinois, U.S.
- Listed height: 6 ft 6 in (1.98 m)
- Listed weight: 235 lb (107 kg)

Career information
- High school: Marengo (IL)
- College: Memphis State
- NFL draft: 1980: undrafted

Career history
- Philadelphia Eagles (1980); Baltimore Colts (1982)*; New York Giants (1982)*; Philadelphia/Baltimore Stars (1983–1985)
- * Offseason or practice squad member only

Career NFL statistics
- Games played: 2
- Stats at Pro Football Reference

Kenneth Robert Dunek (born June 20, 1957) is an American former professional football player who was a tight end in the National Football League (NFL) for the Philadelphia Eagles and in the United States Football League (USFL) for the Philadelphia/Baltimore Stars.

Dunek attended college at Memphis State (now known as University of Memphis) and played forward on the basketball team. He switched to football his senior year in hopes of playing in the NFL. In 1980, he earned a spot on the Philadelphia Eagles roster as a tight end and played for one season. He now resides in Mount Laurel, New Jersey, and works as an author, motivational speaker, film producer, and publisher of JerseyMan and PhillyMan Magazines.
