= 2022 South Florida Bulls football team =

American college football season

2022 South Florida Bulls football
- Conference: American Athletic Conference
- Record: 1–11 (0–8 AAC)
- Head coach: Jeff Scott (3rd season; first 9 games); Daniel Da Prato (interim; final 3 games)
- Offensive coordinator: Travis Trickett (1st season)
- Offensive scheme: Spread option
- Defensive coordinator: Ernie Sims (interim)
- Base defense: 4–2–5
- Home stadium: Raymond James Stadium

2022 American Athletic Conference football standings
	Conf.			Overall
Team	W		L	W		L
No. 9 Tulane y$	7	–	1	12	–	2
UCF y	6	–	2	9	–	5
Cincinnati	6	–	2	9	–	4
SMU	5	–	3	7	–	6
Houston	5	–	3	8	–	5
East Carolina	4	–	4	8	–	5
Navy	4	–	4	4	–	8
Memphis	3	–	5	7	–	6
Tulsa	3	–	5	5	–	7
Temple	1	–	7	3	–	9
South Florida	0	–	8	1	–	11
Championship: Tulane 45, UCF 28
$ – Conference champion; y – Championship game participant; Rankings from AP Poll

The 2022 South Florida Bulls football team represented the University of South Florida (USF) during the 2022 NCAA Division I FBS football season. The Bulls played their home games at Raymond James Stadium in Tampa, Florida. Third-year head coach Jeff Scott was fired after nine games and a 1–8 start; special teams coordinator Daniel Da Prato finished out the season. This season was the ninth for the Bulls as members of the American Athletic Conference, and their 25th season overall.

The season would prove to be an all-time low for the program. They finished with one win for only the second time in their history (the other being 2020). Also like 2020, they went winless in conference play, and did not win a single game against an FBS opponent. As of 2025, their 0.083 win percentage for the season is the worst in school history. Jeff Scott went 4-26 during his 3 years as South Florida's head coach with only one win against an FBS opponent, both the worst in school history.

== Schedule ==
Date	Time	Opponent	Site	TV	Result	Attendance
September 3	4:00 p.m.	No. 25 BYU*	Raymond James Stadium; Tampa, FL	ESPNU	L 21–50	31,521
September 10	7:00 p.m.	Howard*	Raymond James Stadium; Tampa, FL	ESPN+	W 42–20	28,554
September 17	7:30 p.m.	at No. 18 Florida*	Ben Hill Griffin Stadium; Gainesville, FL	SECN	L 28–31	88,496
September 24	12:00 p.m.	at Louisville*	Cardinal Stadium; Louisville, KY	ACCRSN	L 3–41	41,217
October 1	2:30 p.m.	East Carolina	FAU Stadium; Boca Raton, FL (Note: The East Carolina game was moved to Boca Raton, Florida due to Hurricane Ian impact on the west coast of Florida.)	ESPN+	L 28–48	3,708
October 8	2:30 p.m.	at No. 24 Cincinnati	Nippert Stadium; Cincinnati, OH	ESPN+	L 24–28	38,577
October 15	4:00 p.m.	Tulane^{†}	Raymond James Stadium; Tampa, FL	ESPNU	L 31–45	31,053
October 29	12:00 p.m.	at Houston	TDECU Stadium; Houston, TX	ESPN2	L 27–42	24,228
November 5	2:00 p.m.	at Temple	Lincoln Financial Field; Philadelphia, PA	ESPN+	L 28–54	13,862
November 12	12:00 p.m.	SMU	Raymond James Stadium; Tampa, FL	ESPNU	L 23–41	24,907
November 18	9:00 p.m.	at Tulsa	Skelly Field at H. A. Chapman Stadium; Tulsa, OK	ESPN2	L 42–48	13,819
November 26	7:00 p.m.	No. 22 UCF	Raymond James Stadium; Tampa, FL (War on I-4)	ESPN2	L 39–46	32,217
*Non-conference game; ^{†}Homecoming; Rankings from AP Poll (and CFP Rankings, after November 1) - Released prior to game; All times are in Eastern time

== Game summaries ==
=== BYU ===
BYU at USF

Team	1	2	3	4	Total
• No. 25/RV Cougars	28	10	9	3	50
Bulls	0	7	14	0	21

- Date: September 3
- Location: Raymond James Stadium
  Tampa, FL
- Game start: 6:37 p.m. EDT
- Elapsed time: 3:15
- Game attendance: 31,521
- Game weather: 85 °F (29 °C), Winds NW 7 mph; Cloudy; 2 1/2 weather delay from thunderstorms and lightning
- Referee: Kevin Mar • Umpire: Marlow Fitzgerald • Linesman: Bradford Edwards • Line judge: Scott Reilly • Back judge: Lyndon Nixon • Field judge: Randy Smith • Side judge: Jim Murphy • Center judge: Darren Winkley
- TV announcers (ESPNU/ESPNews): Ted Emrich (play-by-play), Barrett Brooks (analyst), and Ashley Stroehlein (sideline reporter)

Scoring summary

Quarter	Time	Drive			Team	Scoring information	Score	
Quarter	Time	Plays	Yards	TOP	Team	Scoring information	BYU	USF
1	14:49	1	75	0:11	BYU	Puka Nacua 75-yard touchdown run, Jake Oldroyd kick good	7	0
1	8:44	10	65	4:01	BYU	Puka Nacua 8-yard touchdown run, Jake Oldroyd kick good	14	0
1	7:59				BYU	Interception returned 33 yards for touchdown by Max Tooley, Jake Oldroyd kick good	21	0
1	4:00	6	82	2:43	BYU	Keanu Hill 21-yard touchdown reception from Jaren Hall, Jake Oldroyd kick good	28	0
2	7:19	8	65	3:30	BYU	Darren Holker 13-yard touchdown reception from Jaren Hall, Jake Oldroyd kick good	35	0
2	2:11	6	19	2:38	BYU	39-yard field goal by Jake Oldroyd	38	0
2	0:14	8	84	1:52	USF	Jaren Mangham 1-yard touchdown run, Spencer Shrader kick good	38	7
3	14:44				USF	Kickoff returned 89 yards for touchdown by Jimmy Horn Jr., Spencer Shrader kick good	38	14
3	7:39				BYU	Punt snap fumbled out of the back of the end zone.	40	14
3	5:32	4	76	2:00	BYU	Christopher Brooks 52-yard touchdown run, Jake Oldroyd kick good	47	14
3	2:23	6	43	2:59	USF	Brian Battie 9-yard touchdown run, Spencer Shrader kick good	47	21
4	10:29	11	55	6:54	BYU	37-yard field goal by Jake Oldroyd	50	21
"TOP" = time of possession. For other American football terms, see Glossary of American football.							50	21

Statistics	BYU	USF
First downs	27	12
Plays–yards	69–575	56–293
Rushes–yards	37–314, 3 TD's	26–121, 2 TD's
Passing yards	261	172
Passing: comp–att–int	25—32–1, 2 TD's	17–30–1
Turnovers		
Time of possession	32:52	23:52

Team	Category	Player	Statistics
BYU	Passing	Jaren Hall	25—32–1, 261 yards, 2 TD's
BYU	Rushing	Christopher Brooks	13 carries, 135 yards, 1 TD
BYU	Receiving	Chase Roberts	3 receptions, 41 yards
USF	Passing	Gerry Bohanon	17–30–1, 172 yards
USF	Rushing	Jaren Mangham	10 carries, 39 yards, 1 TD
USF	Receiving	Xavier Weaver	5 receptions, 113 yards

=== Howard ===
	1	2	3	4	Total
Bison	7	0	7	6	20
Bulls	0	14	14	14	42

=== At Florida ===
South Florida Bulls (1–1) at No. 18 Florida Gators (1–1) – Game summary

Quarter	1	2	3	4	Total
South Florida	7	6	8	7	28
No. 18 Florida	3	21	0	7	31

at Ben Hill Griffin Stadium • Gainesville, FL

- Date: September 17, 2022
- Game time: 7:30 p.m. EDT
- Game weather: Temperature: 77 °F (25 °C) • Wind: NE at 2 miles per hour (3.2 km/h) • Weather: Clear
- Game attendance: 88,496
- Referee: David Smith
- TV announcers (SECN): Tom Hart (play-by-play), Jordan Rodgers (color), and Cole Cubelic (sideline reporter)

Game information

First quarter

- Florida – Adam Mihalek 31-yard field goal, 8:12
- South Florida – Brian Battie 10-yard run (Spencer Shrader kick), 1:21

Second quarter

- Florida – Montrell Johnson Jr. 62-yard run (Adam Mihalek kick), 14:49
- South florida – Spencer Shrader 22-yard field goal, 10:45
- Florida – Nay'Quan Wright 7-yard run (Adam Mihalek kick), 4:45
- Florida – Jalen Kimber 39-yard interception return (Adam Mihalek kick), 3:10
- South Florida – Spencer Shrader 49-yard field goal, 0:10

Third quarter

- South Florida – Gerry Bohanon 6-yard run (Gerry Bohannon pass to Xavier Weaver), 10:27

Fourth quarter

- South Florida – Michel Dukes 1 yard run (Spencer Shrader kick), 11:14
- Florida – Trevor Etienne 3-yard run (Adam Mihalek kick), 5:05

Passing leaders

- South Florida – Gerry Bohanon – 12/28, 116 yards, 2 interceptions
- Florida – Anthony Richardson – 10/18, 112 yards, 2 interceptions

Rushing leaders

- South Florida – Brian Battie – 17 carries, 150 yards, 1 touchdown
- Florida – Montrell Johnson Jr. – 6 carries, 103 yards, 1 touchdown

Receiving leaders

- South Florida – Xavier Weaver – 8 receptions, 82 yards
- Florida – Justin Shorter – 2 receptions, 33 yards; Trent Whittemore – 1 reception, 33 yards

Tackling leaders

- South Florida – Antonio Grier – 10 tackles
- Florida – Trey Dean & Brenton Cox Jr. – 9 tackles

=== At Louisville ===
	1	2	3	4	Total
Bulls	0	0	0	3	3
Cardinals	14	14	3	10	41

=== East Carolina ===
East Carolina Pirates (2-2) vs South Florida Bulls (1-3)

Quarter	1	2	3	4	Total
Pirates	14	27	7	0	48
Bulls	0	7	14	7	28

at FAU Stadium, Boca Raton, FL

- Date: October 1st
- Game time: 2:30 p.m. EST
- Game weather: 82 °F (28 °C) • Weather: Sunny • NE 6 MPH
- Game attendance: 3,708
- Referee: Edwin Lee
- TV announcers (ESPN+): Ted Emrich (play-by-play) and Taylor McHargue (analyst)

Statistics	East Carolina	South Florida
First downs	26	21
Plays–yards	71–575	64–455
Rushes–yards	30–110	36–202
Passing yards	465	253
Passing: comp–att–int	31–41–0	18–28–0
Turnovers		
Time of possession	30:46	29:14

Team	Category	Player	Statistics
East Carolina	Passing	Holton Ahlers	31−41, 465 yards, 6 TD
East Carolina	Rushing	Marlon Gunn Jr.	15 carries, 61 yards
East Carolina	Receiving	C.J. Johnson	7 receptions, 197 yards, 4 TD
South Florida	Passing	Gerry Bohanon	18−28, 253 yards, 3 TD
South Florida	Rushing	Brian Battie	15 carries, 96 yards
South Florida	Receiving	Jimmy Horn Jr.	8 receptions, 180 yards, 2 TD

Scoring summary

Quarter	Time	Drive			Team	Scoring information	Score	
Quarter	Time	Plays	Yards	TOP	Team	Scoring information	East Carolina	South Florida
							0	0
"TOP" = time of possession. For other American football terms, see Glossary of American football.							0	0

=== At Cincinnati ===
Game Six – South Florida Bulls at Cincinnati Bearcats

Quarter	1	2	3	4	Total
Bulls	10	7	0	7	24
No. 24 Bearcats	7	7	7	7	28

at Nippert Stadium • Cincinnati, Ohio

- Date: Saturday, October 8, 2022
- Game time: 2:30 p.m. EST
- Game weather: Sunny • Temperature: 53 °F (12 °C) • Wind: N/A
- Game attendance: 38,577
- Referee: Nate Black
- TV announcers (ESPN+): Richard Cross (play-by-play) and Taylor McHargue (analyst)
- ESPN

Game information

First quarter

- (9:24) South Florida – Brian Battie 22 Yd Run, Spencer Shrader Kick (Drive: 11 plays, 75 yards, 5:36; South Florida 7–0)
- (3:16) South Florida – Spencer Shrader 21 yard field goal (Drive: 12 plays, 65 yards, 6:00; South Florida 10–0)
- (0:45) Cincinnati – Jadon Thompson 28 yard pass from Ben Bryant, Ryan Coe kick (Drive: 6 plays, 75 yards, 2:31; South Florida 10–7)

Second quarter

- (10:27) Cincinnati – Nick Mardner 14 yard pass from Ben Bryant, Ryan Coe kick (Drive: 6 plays, 45 yards, 3:00; Cincinnati 14–10)
- (5:03) South Florida – Xavier Weaver 9 yard pass from Gerry Bohanon, Spencer Shrader kick (Drive: 10 plays, 75 yards, 5:24; South Florida 17–14)

Third quarter

- (10:11) Cincinnati – Charles McClelland 1 yard run, Ryan Coe kick (Drive: 10 plays 75 yards 4:49; Cincinnati 21–17)

Fourth quarter

- (14:56) South Florida – Xavier Weaver 16 yard pass from Gerry Bohanon, Spencer Shrader kick (Drive: 5 plays 88 yards 2:22; South Florida 24–21)
- (9:24) Cincinnati – Charles McClelland 1 yard run, Ryan Coe kick (Drive: 2 Plays 50 Yards 0:35; Cincinnati 28–24)

Statistics	USF	CIN
First downs	19	22
Plays–yards	64–363	60–413
Rushes–yards	43–224	37–221
Passing yards	139	193
Passing: comp–att–int	11–21–0	16–23–2
Turnovers		
Time of possession	32:29	27:31

Team	Category	Player	Statistics
South Florida	Passing	Gerry Bohanon	11–21, 139 yards
South Florida	Rushing	Gerry Bohanon	14 carries, 121 yards
South Florida	Receiving	Xavier Weaver	7 receptions, 112 yards, 2 TD
Cincinnati	Passing	Ben Bryant	15–21, 178 yards, 2 TD, 1 INT
Cincinnati	Rushing	Charles McClelland	21 carries, 182 yards, 2 TD
Cincinnati	Receiving	Tre Tucker	7 receptions, 64 yards

=== Tulane ===
Tulane Green Wave (5–1) at South Florida Bulls (1–5) – Game summary

Quarter	1	2	3	4	Total
Green Wave	3	14	14	14	45
Bulls	7	7	10	7	31

at Raymond James Stadium • Tampa, FL

- Date: October 15, 2022
- Game time: 4:00 p.m. EST
- Game weather: Cloudy, 86 °F (30 °C)
- Game attendance: 31,053
- Referee: Kevin Randall
- TV announcers (ESPNU): Beth Mowins (play-by-play), Kirk Morrison (analyst), and Stormy Buonantony (sideline)

Game information

First quarter

- (8:54) TUL – Valentino Ambrosio 20-yard field goal (Drive: 15 plays, 71 yards, 5:04; Tulane 3–0)
- (1:59) USF – Jimmy Horn Jr. 8-yard pass from Gerry Bohanon, Spencer Shrader kick (Drive: 8 plays, 79 yards, 4:26; South Florida 7–3)

Second quarter

- (13:07) TUL – Michael Pratt 5-yard run, Valentino Ambrosio kick (Drive: 9 plays, 75 yards, 3:52; Tulane 10–7)
- (11:28) USF – Gerry Bohanon 33-yard run, Spencer Shrader kick (Drive: 4 plays, 75 yards, 1:39; South Florida 14–10)
- (0:03) TUL – Duece Watts 11-yard pass from Michael Pratt, Valentino Ambrosio kick (Drive: 15 plays, 63 yards, 4:08; Tulane 17–14)

Third quarter

- (4:52) USF – Spencer Shrader 16-yard field goal (Drive: 7 plays, 45 yards, 3:27; Tied 17–17)
- (4:41) TUL – Tyjae Spears 75-yard run, Valentino Ambrosio kick (Drive: 1 play, 75 yards, 0:11; Tulane 24–17)
- (3:39) TUL – Tyjae Spears 6-yard run, Valentino Ambrosio kick (Drive: 1 play, 6 yards, 0:06; Tulane 31–17)
- (0:09) USF – Xavier Weaver 17-yard pass from Katravis Marsh, Spencer Shrader kick (Drive: 2 plays, 18 yards, 0:39; Tulane 31–24)

Fourth quarter

- (13:11) TUL – Dea Dea McDougle 16-yard pass from Michael Pratt, Valentino Ambrosio kick (Drive: 5 plays, 72 yards, 1:51; Tulane 38–24)
- (9:08) TUL – Michael Pratt 1-yard run, Valentino Ambrosio kick (Drive: 7 plays, 54 yards, 3:41; Tulane 45–24)
- (4:06) USF – Dequan Stanley 73-yard pass from Katravis Marsh, Spencer Shrader kick (Drive: 4 plays, 88 yards, 1:54; Tulane 45–31)

Statistics	TUL	USF
First downs	30	13
Total yards	564	337
Rushes/yards	51–235	28–118
Passing yards	329	259
Passing: Comp–Att–Int	23–36–0	14–23–0
Time of possession	36:52	23:08

Team	Category	Player	Statistics
Tulane	Passing	Michael Pratt	23/35, 329 yards, 2 TD
Tulane	Rushing	Tyjae Spears	18 carries, 151 yards, 2 TD
Tulane	Receiving	Jha'Quan Jackson	7 receptions, 86 yards
USF	Passing	Katravis Marsh	7/15, 150 yards, 2 TD
USF	Rushing	Gerry Bohanon	5 carries, 59 yards, TD
USF	Receiving	Jimmy Horn Jr.	5 receptions, 98 yards, TD

=== At Houston ===
South Florida at Houston

Team	1	2	3	4	Total
Bulls	14	0	7	6	27
• Cougars	14	14	7	7	42

- Date: October 29, 2022
- Location: TDECU Stadium (Houston, TX)
- Game start: 11:01 a.m. CDT
- Elapsed time: 3 hours and 10 minutes
- Game attendance: 24,228
- Game weather: 61 °F (16 °C) • Weather: Cloudy
- Referee: Nate Black
- TV announcers (ESPN2): Beth Mowins (play-by-play), Kirk Morrison (analyst), and Stormy Buonantony (sideline)

Scoring summary
1	(, , )
1	( , , )
2	(, , )
2	( , , )
3	( , , )
3	( , , )
4	( , , )
4	( , , )
OT	( , , )

Statistics	South Florida	Houston
First downs	25	23
Plays–yards	65–429	64–490
Rushes–yards	31–154	25–103
Passing yards	275	387
Passing: Comp–Att–Int	24–34–0	33–39–0
Time of possession	29:53	30:07

Team	Category	Player	Statistics
South Florida	Passing	Katravis Marsh	24/34, 275 yards, 1 TD
South Florida	Rushing	Brian Battie	12 carries, 106 yards, 2 TDs
South Florida	Receiving	Xavier Weaver	7 receptions, 84 yards
Houston	Passing	Clayton Tune	31/37, 380 yards, 4 TDs
Houston	Rushing	Stacy Sneed	10 carries, 60 yards, 2 TDs
Houston	Receiving	Nathaniel Dell	9 receptions, 112 yards, 2 TDs

=== At Temple ===
	1	2	3	4	Total
Bulls	7	7	14	0	28
Owls	3	13	17	21	54

=== SMU ===
SMU Mustangs at South Florida Bulls – Game summary

Quarter	1	2	3	4	Total
Mustangs	10	7	21	3	41
Bulls	0	17	0	6	23

at Raymond James Stadium, Tampa, Florida

- Date: November 12
- Game time: 11:00 a.m. CST / 12:00 p.m. EST
- Game weather: Sunny, 80 °F (27 °C)
- Game attendance: 24,907
- Referee: Kevin Randall
- TV announcers (ESPNU): Kevin Brown (play-by-play) and Hutson Mason (analyst)

Game information

First quarter

- SMU – Camar Wheaton 1-yard run (Collin Rogers kick), 10:08. Mustangs 7–0. Drive: 6 plays, 54 yards, 1:28.
- SMU – Collin Rogers 22-yard field goal, 4:22. Mustangs 10–0. Drive: 9 plays, 50 yards, 3:40.

Second quarter

- USF – Jason Albritton 1-yard run (Spencer Shrader kick), 13:41. Mustangs 10–7. Drive: 12 plays, 75 yards, 5:36.
- SMU – Camar Wheaton 18-yard run (Collin Rogers kick), 9:23. Mustangs 17–7. Drive: 11 plays, 75 yards, 4:18.
- USF – Xavier Weaver 32-yard pass from Katravis Marsh (Spencer Shrader kick), 2:44. Mustangs 17–14. Drive: 3 plays, 51 yards, 1:10.
- USF – Spencer Shrader 41-yard field goal, 0:08. Tied 17–17. Drive: 7 plays, 40 yards, 0:53.

Third quarter

- SMU – Rashee Rice 21-yard pass from Tanner Mordecai (Collin Rogers kick), 8:10. Mustangs 24–17. Drive: 6 plays, 97 yards, 2:16.
- SMU – Jordan Kerley 70-yard pass from Tanner Mordecai (Collin Rogers kick), 5:56. Mustangs 31–17. Drive: 1 play, 70 yards, 0:09.
- SMU – Tyler Lavine 8-yard run (Collin Rogers kick), 0:13. Mustangs 38–17. Drive: 6 plays, 44 yards, 2:48.

Fourth quarter

- SMU – Collin Rogers 45-yard field goal, 8:02. Mustangs 41–17. Drive: 7 plays, 52 yards, 3:38.
- USF – Jayson Littlejohn 17-yard pass from Byrum Brown (pass failed), 1:46. Mustangs 41–23. Drive: 14 plays, 75 yards, 6:16.

Top passers

- SMU – Tanner Mordecai – 19/27, 280 yards, 2 TD
- USF – Katravis Marsh – 12/31, 178 yards, TD, INT

Top rushers

- SMU – Camar Wheaton – 14 rushes, 112 yards, 2 TD
- USF – Brian Battie – 26 rushes, 145 yards

Top receivers

- SMU – Jordan Kerley – 7 receptions, 156 yards, TD
- USF – Xavier Weaver – 4 receptions, 60 yards, TD

=== At Tulsa ===
	1	2	3	4	Total
Bulls	10	10	15	7	42
Golden Hurricane	7	24	7	10	48

=== UCF ===
	1	2	3	4	Total
Knights	14	14	3	15	46
Bulls	0	7	22	10	39
