= 2022 East Carolina Pirates football team =

American college football season

2022 East Carolina Pirates football

Birmingham Bowl champion

Birmingham Bowl, W 53–29 vs. Coastal Carolina
- Conference: American Athletic Conference
- Record: 8–5 (4–4 AAC)
- Head coach: Mike Houston (4th season)
- Offensive coordinator: Donnie Kirkpatrick (4th season)
- Offensive scheme: Spread
- Defensive coordinator: Blake Harrell (3rd season)
- Base defense: 3–4 or 4–2–5
- Home stadium: Dowdy-Ficklen Stadium

2022 American Athletic Conference football standings
	Conf.			Overall
Team	W		L	W		L
No. 9 Tulane y$	7	–	1	12	–	2
UCF y	6	–	2	9	–	5
Cincinnati	6	–	2	9	–	4
SMU	5	–	3	7	–	6
Houston	5	–	3	8	–	5
East Carolina	4	–	4	8	–	5
Navy	4	–	4	4	–	8
Memphis	3	–	5	7	–	6
Tulsa	3	–	5	5	–	7
Temple	1	–	7	3	–	9
South Florida	0	–	8	1	–	11
Championship: Tulane 45, UCF 28
$ – Conference champion; y – Championship game participant; Rankings from AP Poll

The 2022 East Carolina Pirates football team represented East Carolina University during the 2022 NCAA Division I FBS football season. The Pirates played their home games at Dowdy-Ficklen Stadium in Greenville, North Carolina, and competed as members of the American Athletic Conference. They were led by head coach Mike Houston, in his fourth season.

== Offseason ==
=== Transfers ===
==== Incoming ====
Player	Position	Previous Team
Chance Bates	LB	Kennesaw State
Kamarro Edmonds	RB	North Carolina
Michael Edwards	LB	Georgia Southern
Aapri Washington	CB	Buffalo
Isaiah Winstead	WR	Toledo
Jarett Garner	WR	Duke
Justin Redd	IOL	Norfolk State
Ben Johnson	OT	Marist
Jaylen Johnson	WR	Georgia
Jack Powers	EDGE	Nevada
Alex Harper	LS	North Carolina Central
Shaundre Mims	DL	Charleston Southern
David Chapeau	P	Air Force
Parker Moorer	OT	West Virginia
Shavon Revel	CB	Louisburg College

==== Outgoing ====
Player	Position	Destination
Tyree Saunders	WR	Alabama State
Ray Rose	WR	Tennessee State
Walter Simmons	QB	Bethune-Cookman
J'Vian McCray	DL	Austin Peay
Cruz Temple	S	Arkansas State
Jacob Coleman	TE	Middle Tennessee State
Troy Lewis	WR	James Madison
Jayden Chalmers	CB	Campbell
TJ Lockley	WR	Jacksonville State
David Laney	S	North Carolina A&T
Nolan Johnson	CB	Miami (OH)
Dre Terry	EDGE	Alabama A&M
Traveon Freshwater	DL	Elizabeth City State
Slade Roy	LS	LSU
Nasir Clerk	CB	Delaware State
Trent Holler	OL	Marshall
Jaquaez Powell	OL	None
Asa Barnes	RB	None
Henry Garrison	DL	None
Bryan Gragg	TE	None
Wistar Allen	LB	None

=== 2022 recruiting class ===
East Carolina signed 18 players in the class of 2022. The Pirates' recruiting class ranks 86th by 247Sports, 91st by On3.com, and 79th by Rivals.

College recruiting
Name	Hometown	School	Height	Weight	Commit date
Marlon Gunn Jr. RB	Baton Rouge, Louisiana	Scotlandville Magnet High School	5 ft 10 in (1.78 m)	200 lb (91 kg)	Sep 23, 2021
Marlon Gunn Jr. RB	Recruit ratings: Rivals: 247Sports: On3: ESPN: (76)				
Jacob Sacra; OT	Baltimore, Maryland	St. Frances Academy	6 ft 5 in (1.96 m)	315 lb (143 kg)	Jul 6, 2021
Jacob Sacra; OT	Recruit ratings: Rivals: 247Sports: On3: ESPN: (76)				
Overall recruit ranking:
Note: In many cases, Scout, Rivals, 247Sports, On3, and ESPN may conflict in their listings of height and weight.; In these cases, the average was taken. ESPN grades are on a 100-point scale.; Sources:

== Schedule ==
The Pirates will host the three of their non-conference opponents, NC State from the ACC, Old Dominion from Conference USA and Campbell from Division I FCS. They will visit BYU from the FBS Independents

Date	Time	Opponent	Site	TV	Result	Attendance
September 3	12:00 p.m.	No. 13 NC State*	Dowdy–Ficklen Stadium; Greenville, NC (rivalry)	ESPN	L 20–21	51,711
September 10	6:00 p.m.	Old Dominion*	Dowdy–Ficklen Stadium; Greenville, NC	ESPN+	W 39–21	36,853
September 17	6:00 p.m.	Campbell*	Dowdy–Ficklen Stadium; Greenville, NC	ESPN+	W 49–10	43,036
September 24	6:00 p.m.	Navy	Dowdy–Ficklen Stadium; Greenville, NC	ESPN+	L 20–23 ^{2OT}	39,227
October 1	2:30 p.m.	at South Florida	FAU Stadium; Boca Raton, FL (Note: The South Florida game was moved to Boca Raton, Florida due to Hurricane Ian impact on the west coast of Florida.)	ESPN+	W 48–28	3,708
October 8	3:30 p.m.	at Tulane	Yulman Stadium; New Orleans, LA	ESPNU	L 9–24	14,193
October 15	7:30 p.m.	Memphis^{†}	Dowdy–Ficklen Stadium; Greenville, NC	ESPNU	W 47–45 ^{4OT}	38,059
October 22	7:30 p.m.	UCF	Dowdy–Ficklen Stadium; Greenville, NC	ESPNU	W 34–13	38,245
October 28	8:00 p.m.	at BYU*	LaVell Edwards Stadium; Provo, UT	ESPN2	W 27–24	55,525
November 11	8:00 p.m.	at Cincinnati	Nippert Stadium; Cincinnati, OH	ESPN2	L 25–27	38,199
November 19	2:00 p.m.	Houston	Dowdy–Ficklen Stadium; Greenville, NC	ESPN+	L 3–42	42,475
November 26	1:00 p.m.	at Temple	Lincoln Financial Field; Philadelphia, PA	ESPN+	W 49–46	13,037
December 27	6:45 p.m.	vs. Coastal Carolina*	Protective Stadium; Birmingham, AL (Birmingham Bowl)	ESPN	W 53–29	15,901
*Non-conference game; ^{†}Homecoming; Rankings from AP Poll (and CFP Rankings, after November 1) - Released prior to game; All times are in Eastern time

== Roster ==
2022 East Carolina Pirates football team roster
Players
Coaches
Offense

Pos.	#	Name	Class
WR	0	Jhari Patterson	So
WR	1	Jaylen Johnson	Jr
RB	2	Keaton Mitchell	So
TE	4	Ryan Jones	GS
WR	5	C. J. Johnson	Jr
QB	6	Ryan Stubblefield	Fr
WR	7	Terrance Copper Jr.	Fr
WR	8	Taji Hudson	So
TE	9	Tyler Savage	So
QB	10	Mason Garcia	So
WR	11	Isaiah Winstead	GS
QB	12	Holton Ahlers	Sr
QB	13	Grantt Logan	Fr
WR	14	Maceo Donald	Jr
QB	15	Alex Flinn	So
WR	17	Kerry King	Fr
WR	19	Josh Murphy	Fr
WR	20	Andrew Doss	Fr
RB	21	Marlon Gunn Jr.	Fr
RB	22	Nemo Squire	Fr
RB	23	Joseph McKay	Fr
WR	25	Melvin Jacobs	So
WR	28	Khaheim Bragg	So
RB	30	Cameron Moore	So
WR	33	Brock Spalding	Fr
RB	37	Kamarro Edmonds	So
RB	40	C. J. Armstrong	Fr
RB	47	Rahjai Harris	So
RB	48	Grayson Klue	Fr
OL	52	Parker Moorer	So
OL	54	Avery Jones	Jr
OL	56	Ethan Lang	Fr
OL	60	Emmanuel Poku	Fr
OL	61	Keziah Everett	So
OL	63	Grayson Lewis	So
OL	64	Grant Copeland	Fr
OL	65	Zion Wilson	Fr
OL	66	Isaiah Foote	So
OL	68	Trey Hardison	Fr
OL	69	Noah Henderson	Jr
OL	70	Justin Redd	Sr
OL	71	Bailey Malovic	Sr
OL	72	Ben Johnson	Sr
OL	73	Nishad Strother	So
OL	74	Hampton Ergle	So
OL	75	Omari Allen	Fr
OL	76	Jacob Sacra	Fr
OL	77	Walter Stribling	So
OL	76	Richard Pearce	Fr
OL	79	Elisha Samples	Fr
TE	80	Shane Calhoun	So
TE	81	Andre Pegues	Jr
WR	82	Jarett Garner	Sr
WR	83	Blue Coleman	Fr
TE	84	D'Angelo McKinnie	Jr
TE	85	Aaron Jarman	GS
WR	86	Brandon Still	Fr
TE	87	Joseph Samson	So
WR	88	Jsi Hatfield	Jr
TE	98	Max Lantzsch	Fr

Defense

Pos.	#	Name	Class
CB	0	Juan Powell	So
CB	1	Malik Fleming	Jr
S	3	Demetrius Mauney	Jr
S	5	Jireh Wilson	Jr
ILB	6	Teylor Jackson	So
S	7	Gerard Stringer	Sr
DL	8	Immanuel Hickman	So
S	9	Teagan Wilk	So
ILB	10	Xavier Smith	Sr
OLB	11	Jeremy Lewis	Jr
CB	12	Dru Dotter	Fr
DL	13	Chad Stephens	So
DL	15	Rick D'Abreu	Jr
ILB	19	Jacoby Simpson	Jr
S	20	Ty Moss	Fr
S	21	Jordan Huff	So
CB	22	Aapri Washington	GS
CB	23	Damel Hickman	Jr
OLB	24	Jack Powers	Jr
S	25	Kingston McKinstry	Jr
CB	26	Isaiah Brown-Murray	Fr
S	27	Shawn Dourseau	Jr
CB	28	Shavon Revel	So
OLB	30	Samuel Dankah	Fr
CB	31	Fletcher Marshall Jr.	So
S	32	Julius Wood	Jr
ILB	33	Zakye Barker	Fr
ILB	34	Myles Berry	Sr
S	35	Brandon Higgs	So
S	37	Jonathan Coleman II	So
ILB	38	Mike Edwards III	So
S	39	Daren Perry Jr.	Fr
ILB	40	Chance Bates	GS
CB	42	G'Mone Wilson	So
OLB	44	Eric Doctor Jr.	So
S	45	Devon King	So
OLB	47	Trevon Hayes	Fr
S	49	Josh Benton	Fr
ILB	51	Jamari Young	Fr
DL	52	Xavier McIver	So
DL	53	Suirad Ware	So
DL	55	Jasiyah Robinson	Fr
DL	56	D'Anta Johnson	So
ILB	58	Jackson Barker	Fr
DL	90	Elijah Morris	So
DL	91	Zakkai Wilson	Fr
DL	92	C. J. Mims	Fr
DL	93	Preston Carr	Fr
DL	94	Elijah Robinson	Jr
DL	95	Jason Shuford	So
DL	96	Shaundre Mims	GS
DL	97	Justyn Haynesworth	So
DL	99	J. D. Lampley	Fr

Special teams

Pos.	#	Name	Class
P	38	David Chapeau	So
K	41	Owen Daffer	So
LS	43	Colby Garfield	So
K	46	Carson Smith	Fr
LS	49	Alex Harper	So
K	95	Andrew Conrad	Fr
K	99	Laith Marjan	Fr

Head coach

- Mike Houston

Coordinators/assistant coaches

- Donnie Kirkpatrick – Offensive coordinator/Quarterbacks
- Blake Harrell – Defensive coordinator/Inside linebackers
- Tim Daoust – Special teams coordinator/Outside linebackers/Defensive ends
- Latrell Scott – Passing game coordinator/Tight ends
- Chris Foster – Running backs
- Re'quan Boyette – Wide receivers
- Allen Mogridge – Offensive linemen
- Jules Montinar – Cornerbacks
- Roy Tesh – Defensive tackles
- Tripp Weaver – Safeties
- John Williams Jr. – Director, Strength and Conditioning
- Aaron Auer – Offensive analyst
- Matthew Symmes – Defensive analyst
- Jack Nudo – Special teams analyst
- Takoby Cofield – Offensive assistant
- Chris Canada – Graduate assistant
- Mark Hatcher – Graduate assistant
- Michael Mosah – Graduate assistant

Legend

- (C) Team captain
- (S) Suspended
- (I) Ineligible
- Injured
- Redshirt

Roster
Last update: 8/15/23

== Game summaries ==
=== vs No. 13 NC State (rivalry) ===
No. 13 NC State Wolfpack (0–0) vs East Carolina Pirates (0–0) – Game summary

Quarter	1	2	3	4	Total
No. 13 Wolfpack	14	7	0	0	21
Pirates	7	0	7	6	20

at Dowdy–Ficklen Stadium • Greenville, North Carolina

- Date: September 3
- Game time: 12:00 p.m. EDT
- Game weather: Sunny, 87 °F (31 °C)
- Game attendance: 51,711
- Referee: Riley Johnson
- TV announcers (ESPN): Anish Shroff (play-by-play), Brock Osweiler (analyst), and Lauren Sisler (sideline reporter)
- Box score, Recap

Game information

First quarter

- (10:03) ECU – C. J. Johnson 39-yard pass from Holton Ahlers, Owen Daffer kick (Drive: 7 plays, 70 yards, 3:15; East Carolina 7–0)
- (2:40) NCST – Thayer Thomas 12-yard pass from Devin Leary, Christopher Dunn kick (Drive: 8 plays, 64 yards, 4:11; Tied 7–7)
- (1:34) NCST – Sean Brown 0-yard blocked punt return, Christopher Dunn kick (NC State 14–7)

Second quarter

- (1:09) NCST – Demie Sumo-Karngbaye 24-yard run, Christopher Dunn kick (Drive: 12 plays, 85 yards, 3:48; NC State 21–7)

Third quarter

- (5:17) ECU – Shane Calhoun 1-yard pass from Holton Ahlers, Owen Daffer kick (Drive: 13 plays, 79 yards, 6:28; NC State 21–14)

Fourth quarter

- (2:58) ECU – Rahjai Harris 3-yard run, Owen Daffer kick failed (Drive: 4 plays, 27 yards, 2:19; NC State 21–20)

Statistics	NCSU	ECU
First downs	18	18
Plays–yards	65–344	68–383
Rushes–yards	32–133	27–116
Passing yards	211	267
Passing: comp–att–int	17–33–1	25–41–2
Time of possession	27:42	32:18

Team	Category	Player	Statistics
NC State	Passing	Devin Leary	17/33, 211 yards, 1 TD, 1 INT
NC State	Rushing	Demie Sumo-Karngbaye	14 carries, 79 yards, 1 TD
NC State	Receiving	Thayer Thomas	4 receptions, 58 yards, 1 TD
East Carolina	Passing	Holton Ahlers	25/41, 267 yards, 2 TD, 2 INT
East Carolina	Rushing	Holton Ahlers	5 carries, 57 yards
East Carolina	Receiving	C. J. Johnson	6 receptions, 90 yards, 1 TD

=== vs Old Dominion ===
Old Dominion Monarchs (1-0) vs East Carolina Pirates (0-1)

Quarter	1	2	3	4	Total
Monarchs	7	0	7	7	21
Pirates	9	7	6	17	39

at Dowdy-Ficklen Stadium, Greenville, NC

- Date: September 10
- Game time: 6:00 p.m. EST
- Game weather: 77 °F (25 °C) • Weather: Rain •
- Game attendance: 36,853
- Referee: Marshall Lewis
- TV announcers (ESPN+): Shawn Kenney (play-by-play) and Jay Sonnhalter (analyst)

Statistics	Old Dominion	East Carolina
First downs	12	30
Plays–yards	44–290	86–531
Rushes–yards	14–15	47–261
Passing yards	275	270
Passing: comp–att–int	18–29–1	25–39–0
Turnovers		
Time of possession	19:08	40:52

Team	Category	Player	Statistics
Old Dominion	Passing	Hayden Wolff	18–30, 275 yards, 3 TD, 1 INT
Old Dominion	Rushing	Blake Watson	5 carries, 45 yards
Old Dominion	Receiving	Ali Jennings III	8 receptions, 200 yards, 3 TD
East Carolina	Passing	Holton Ahlers	25–39, 270 yards, 2 TD
East Carolina	Rushing	Keaton Mitchell	18 carries, 160 yards, 2 TD
East Carolina	Receiving	Jaylen Johnson	9 receptions, 93 yards

Scoring summary

Quarter	Time	Drive			Team	Scoring information	Score	
Quarter	Time	Plays	Yards	TOP	Team	Scoring information	Old Dominion	East Carolina
							0	0
"TOP" = time of possession. For other American football terms, see Glossary of American football.							0	0

=== vs Campbell ===
Campbell Fighting Camels (1-1) vs East Carolina Pirates (1-1)

Quarter	1	2	3	4	Total
Fighting Camels	10	0	0	0	10
Pirates	7	14	21	7	49

at Dowdy-Ficklen Stadium, Greenville, NC

- Date: September 17
- Game time: 6:00 p.m. EST
- Game weather: 80 °F (27 °C) • Weather: Sunny •
- Game attendance: 43,036
- Referee: Steve Anderson
- TV announcers (ESPN+): Ted Emrich (play-by-play) and Jay Sonnhalter (analyst)

Statistics	Campbell	East Carolina
First downs	21	28
Plays–yards	71–403	65–572
Rushes–yards	33–103	38–270
Passing yards	300	302
Passing: comp–att–int	23–38–1	22–27–0
Turnovers		
Time of possession	30:52	29:08

Team	Category	Player	Statistics
Campbell	Passing	Hajj-Malik Williams	23−38, 300 yards, 1 TD, 1 INT
Campbell	Rushing	NaQuari Rogers	13 carries, 35 yards
Campbell	Receiving	Jalen Kelsey	3 receptions, 79 yards, 1 TD
East Carolina	Passing	Holton Ahlers	17−20, 263 yards, 3 TD
East Carolina	Rushing	Keaton Mitchell	13 carries, 185 yards, 1 TD
East Carolina	Receiving	Isaiah Winstead	6 receptions, 112 yards

Scoring summary

Quarter	Time	Drive			Team	Scoring information	Score	
Quarter	Time	Plays	Yards	TOP	Team	Scoring information	Campbell	East Carolina
							0	0
"TOP" = time of possession. For other American football terms, see Glossary of American football.							0	0

=== vs Navy ===
Navy Midshipmen (0-2) vs East Carolina Pirates (2-1)

Quarter	1	2	3	4	OT	2OT	Total
Midshipmen	0	3	0	14	3	3	23
Pirates	3	0	0	14	3	0	20

at Dowdy-Ficklen Stadium, Greenville, NC

- Date: September 24
- Game time: 6:00 p.m. EST
- Game weather: 75 °F (24 °C) • Weather: Sunny • W 6 MPH
- Game attendance: 39,227
- Referee: Tim Rich
- TV announcers (ESPN+): Richard Cross (play-by-play) and Jay Sonnhalter (analyst)

Statistics	Navy	East Carolina
First downs	22	16
Plays–yards	77–343	62–370
Rushes–yards	66–191	28–103
Passing yards	152	267
Passing: comp–att–int	7–11–0	22–34–1
Turnovers		
Time of possession	37:02	22:58

Team	Category	Player	Statistics
Navy	Passing	Tai Lavatai	7−10, 152 yards, 1 TD
Navy	Rushing	Maquel Haywood	13 carries, 67 yards
Navy	Receiving	Vincent Terrell Jr.	3 receptions, 114 yards, 1 TD
East Carolina	Passing	Holton Ahlers	22−34, 267 yards, 2 TD, 1 INT
East Carolina	Rushing	Rahjai Harris	15 carries, 75 yards
East Carolina	Receiving	Isaiah Winstead	11 receptions, 143 yards, 1 TD

Scoring summary

Quarter	Time	Drive			Team	Scoring information	Score	
Quarter	Time	Plays	Yards	TOP	Team	Scoring information	Navy	East Carolina
							0	0
"TOP" = time of possession. For other American football terms, see Glossary of American football.							0	0

=== At South Florida ===
East Carolina Pirates (2-2) vs South Florida Bulls (1-3)

Quarter	1	2	3	4	Total
Pirates	14	27	7	0	48
Bulls	0	7	14	7	28

at FAU Stadium, Boca Raton, FL

- Date: October 1
- Game time: 2:30 p.m. EST
- Game weather: 82 °F (28 °C) • Weather: Sunny • NE 6 MPH
- Game attendance: 3,708
- Referee: Edwin Lee
- TV announcers (ESPN+): Ted Emrich (play-by-play) and Taylor McHargue (analyst)

Statistics	East Carolina	South Florida
First downs	26	21
Plays–yards	71–575	64–455
Rushes–yards	30–110	36–202
Passing yards	465	253
Passing: comp–att–int	31–41–0	18–28–0
Turnovers		
Time of possession	30:46	29:14

Team	Category	Player	Statistics
East Carolina	Passing	Holton Ahlers	31−41, 465 yards, 6 TD
East Carolina	Rushing	Marlon Gunn Jr.	15 carries, 61 yards
East Carolina	Receiving	C.J. Johnson	7 receptions, 197 yards, 4 TD
South Florida	Passing	Gerry Bohanon	18−28, 253 yards, 3 TD
South Florida	Rushing	Brian Battie	15 carries, 96 yards
South Florida	Receiving	Jimmy Horn Jr.	8 receptions, 180 yards, 2 TD

Scoring summary

Quarter	Time	Drive			Team	Scoring information	Score	
Quarter	Time	Plays	Yards	TOP	Team	Scoring information	East Carolina	South Florida
							0	0
"TOP" = time of possession. For other American football terms, see Glossary of American football.							0	0

=== At Tulane ===
East Carolina Pirates (3-2) vs Tulane Green Wave (4-1)

Quarter	1	2	3	4	Total
Pirates	3	6	0	0	9
Green Wave	0	14	7	3	24

at Yulman Stadium, New Orleans, LA

- Date: October 8
- Game time: 3:30 p.m. EST
- Game weather: 83 °F (28 °C) • Weather: Sunny • NE 9 MPH
- Game attendance: 14,193
- Referee: Luke Richmond
- TV announcers (ESPNU): Anish Shroff (play-by-play), Brock Osweiler (analyst), and Taylor McGregor (sideline reporter)

Statistics	East Carolina	Tulane
First downs	24	22
Plays–yards	75–419	67–391
Rushes–yards	23–131	32–41
Passing yards	288	350
Passing: comp–att–int	32–52–2	28–35–0
Turnovers		
Time of possession	27:25	32:35

Team	Category	Player	Statistics
East Carolina	Passing	Holton Ahlers	32–51, 288 yards, 1 TD, 2 INT
East Carolina	Rushing	Marlon Gunn Jr.	7 carries, 67 yards
East Carolina	Receiving	Isaiah Winstead	9 receptions, 90 yards
Tulane	Passing	Michael Pratt	27–34, 326 yards, 2 TD
Tulane	Rushing	Tyjae Spears	16 carries, 53 yards
Tulane	Receiving	Duece Watts	4 receptions, 93 yards, 1 TD

Scoring summary

Quarter	Time	Drive			Team	Scoring information	Score	
Quarter	Time	Plays	Yards	TOP	Team	Scoring information	East Carolina	Tulane
							0	0
"TOP" = time of possession. For other American football terms, see Glossary of American football.							0	0

=== vs Memphis ===
Memphis Tigers (4-2) vs East Carolina Pirates (3-3)

Quarter	1	2	3	4	OT	2OT	3OT	4OT	Total
Tigers	7	10	3	10	7	6	2	0	45
Pirates	0	13	7	10	7	6	2	2	47

at Dowdy-Ficklen Stadium, Greenville, NC

- Date: October 15
- Game time: 7:30 p.m. EST
- Game weather: 66 °F (19 °C) • Weather: Clear • W 9 MPH
- Game attendance: 38,059
- Referee: Nate Black
- TV announcers (ESPNU): Brian Custer (play-by-play), Dustin Fox (analyst), and Lauren Sisler (sideline reporter)

Statistics	Memphis	East Carolina
First downs	24	25
Plays–yards	72–491	77–473
Rushes–yards	35–84	42–169
Passing yards	407	304
Passing: comp–att–int	27–37–2	26–35–0
Turnovers		
Time of possession	24:27	32:09

Team	Category	Player	Statistics
Memphis	Passing	Seth Henigan	27–37, 407 yards, 2 TD, 2 INT
Memphis	Rushing	Asa Martin	12 carries, 59 yards, 2 TD
Memphis	Receiving	Joe Scates	5 receptions, 112 yards, 1 TD
East Carolina	Passing	Holton Ahlers	26–34, 304 yards, 1 TD
East Carolina	Rushing	Keaton Mitchell	29 carries, 149 yards, 3 TD
East Carolina	Receiving	Isaiah Winstead	9 receptions, 154 yards, 1 TD

Scoring summary

Quarter	Time	Drive			Team	Scoring information	Score	
Quarter	Time	Plays	Yards	TOP	Team	Scoring information	Memphis	East Carolina
							0	0
"TOP" = time of possession. For other American football terms, see Glossary of American football.							0	0

=== vs UCF ===
UCF Knights (5-1) vs East Carolina Pirates (4-2)

Quarter	1	2	3	4	Total
Knights	0	3	7	3	13
Pirates	3	14	7	10	34

at Dowdy-Ficklen Stadium, Greenville, NC

- Date: October 22
- Game time: 7:30 p.m. EST
- Game weather: 65 °F (18 °C) • Weather: Clear • E 7 MPH
- Game attendance: 38,245
- Referee: Henry Johns
- TV announcers (ESPNU): John Schriffen (play-by-play) and Rene Ingoglia (analyst)
- -

Statistics	UCF	East Carolina
First downs	23	24
Plays–yards	69–426	69–458
Rushes–yards	32–130	33–147
Passing yards	296	311
Passing: comp–att–int	25–37–3	30–36–0
Turnovers		
Time of possession	24:49	35:11

Team	Category	Player	Statistics
UCF	Passing	John Rhys Plumlee	25–37, 296 yards, 3 INT
UCF	Rushing	Isaiah Bowser	11 carries, 63 yards, 1 TD
UCF	Receiving	Kobe Hudson	5 receptions, 85 yards
East Carolina	Passing	Holton Ahlers	30–36, 311 yards, 1 TD
East Carolina	Rushing	Keaton Mitchell	16 carries, 105 yards, 2 TD
East Carolina	Receiving	C.J. Johnson	11 receptions, 140 yards, 1 TD

Scoring summary

Quarter	Time	Drive			Team	Scoring information	Score	
Quarter	Time	Plays	Yards	TOP	Team	Scoring information	UCF	East Carolina
							0	0
"TOP" = time of possession. For other American football terms, see Glossary of American football.							0	0

=== At BYU ===
East Carolina Pirates (5-3) vs BYU Cougars (4-4)

Quarter	1	2	3	4	Total
Pirates	7	10	7	3	27
Cougars	3	14	7	0	24

at LaVell Edwards Stadium, Provo, UT

- Date: October 28
- Game time: 8:00 p.m. EST
- Game weather: 52 °F (11 °C) • Weather: Sunny • SW 6 MPH
- Game attendance: 55,525
- Referee: Edwin Lee
- TV announcers (ESPN2): Roy Philpott (play-by-play), Andre Ware (analyst), and Paul Carcaterra (sideline reporter)

Statistics	East Carolina	BYU
First downs	20	22
Plays–yards	58–424	67–388
Rushes–yards	36–227	42–244
Passing yards	197	144
Passing: comp–att–int	15–22–0	18–25–0
Turnovers		
Time of possession	26:04	33:56

Team	Category	Player	Statistics
East Carolina	Passing	Holton Ahlers	15–22, 197 yards
East Carolina	Rushing	Keaton Mitchell	21 carries, 176 yards, 1 TD
East Carolina	Receiving	Isaiah Winstead	5 receptions, 63 yards
BYU	Passing	Jaren Hall	18–25, 144 yards, 2 TD
BYU	Rushing	Lopini Katoa	20 carries, 116 yards, 1 TD
BYU	Receiving	Puka Nacua	7 receptions, 79 yards, 1 TD

Scoring summary

Quarter	Time	Drive			Team	Scoring information	Score	
Quarter	Time	Plays	Yards	TOP	Team	Scoring information	East Carolina	BYU
							0	0
"TOP" = time of possession. For other American football terms, see Glossary of American football.							0	0

=== At Cincinnati ===
East Carolina Pirates (6-3) vs Cincinnati Bearcats (7-2)

Quarter	1	2	3	4	Total
Pirates	5	7	13	0	25
Bearcats	7	17	0	3	27

at Nippert Stadium, Cincinnati, OH

- Date: November 11
- Game time: 8:00 p.m. EST
- Game weather: 58 °F (14 °C) • Weather: Sunny • SE 12 MPH
- Game attendance: 38,199
- Referee: Henry Johns
- TV announcers (ESPN2): Roy Philpott (play-by-play), Andre Ware (analyst), and Paul Carcaterra (sideline)

Statistics	East Carolina	Cincinnati
First downs	22	13
Plays–yards	79–450	57–310
Rushes–yards	33–174	26–66
Passing yards	276	244
Passing: comp–att–int	25–45–0	14–31–1
Turnovers		
Time of possession	36:20	23:34

Team	Category	Player	Statistics
East Carolina	Passing	Holton Ahlers	26–46, 280 yards, 2 TD
East Carolina	Rushing	Keaton Mitchell	16 carries, 112 yards, 1 TD
East Carolina	Receiving	C.J. Johnson	7 receptions, 123 yards, 1 TD
Cincinnati	Passing	Ben Bryant	14–30, 244 yards, 2 TD, 1 INT
Cincinnati	Rushing	Charles McClelland	10 carries, 39 yards
Cincinnati	Receiving	Tyler Scott	7 receptions, 140 yards

Scoring summary

Quarter	Time	Drive			Team	Scoring information	Score	
Quarter	Time	Plays	Yards	TOP	Team	Scoring information	East Carolina	Cincinnati
							0	0
"TOP" = time of possession. For other American football terms, see Glossary of American football.							0	0

=== vs Houston ===
Houston Cougars (6-4) vs East Carolina Pirates (6-4)

Quarter	1	2	3	4	Total
Cougars	7	14	14	7	42
Pirates	0	0	3	0	3

at Dowdy-Ficklen Stadium, Greenville, NC

- Date: November 19
- Game time: 2:00 p.m. EST
- Game weather: 56 °F (13 °C) • Weather: Sunny • N 2 MPH
- Game attendance: 42,475
- Referee: Kevin Randall
- TV announcers (ESPN+): Richard Cross (play-by-play) and Taylor McHargue (analyst)

Statistics	Houston	East Carolina
First downs	27	13
Plays–yards	68–515	57–315
Rushes–yards	24–80	22–118
Passing yards	435	197
Passing: comp–att–int	32–44–1	17–35–0
Turnovers		
Time of possession	30:42	29:18

Team	Category	Player	Statistics
Houston	Passing	Clayton Tune	32–44, 435 yards, 4 TD, 1 INT
Houston	Rushing	Clayton Tune	6 carries, 43 yards
Houston	Receiving	Tank Dell	9 receptions, 176 yards, 1 TD
East Carolina	Passing	Holton Ahlers	15–30, 182 yards
East Carolina	Rushing	Keaton Mitchell	14 carries, 129 yards
East Carolina	Receiving	Jsi Hatfield	2 receptions, 68 yards

Scoring summary

Quarter	Time	Drive			Team	Scoring information	Score	
Quarter	Time	Plays	Yards	TOP	Team	Scoring information	Houston	East Carolina
							0	0
"TOP" = time of possession. For other American football terms, see Glossary of American football.							0	0

=== At Temple ===
East Carolina Pirates (6-5) vs Temple Owls (3-8)

Quarter	1	2	3	4	Total
Pirates	7	21	14	7	49
Owls	3	21	15	7	46

at Lincoln Financial Field, Philadelphia, PA

- Date: November 26
- Game time: 1:00 p.m. EST
- Game weather: 55 °F (13 °C) • Weather: Sunny • E 11 MPH
- Game attendance: 13,037
- Referee: Edwin Lee
- TV announcers (ESPN+): Richard Cross (play-by-play) and Taylor McHargue (analyst)

Statistics	East Carolina	Temple
First downs	23	30
Plays–yards	–534	–575
Rushes–yards	–	–
Passing yards	314	527
Passing: comp–att–int	––	––
Turnovers		
Time of possession	31:00	29:00

Team	Category	Player	Statistics
East Carolina	Passing		
East Carolina	Rushing		
East Carolina	Receiving		
Temple	Passing		
Temple	Rushing		
Temple	Receiving		

Scoring summary

Quarter	Time	Drive			Team	Scoring information	Score	
Quarter	Time	Plays	Yards	TOP	Team	Scoring information	East Carolina	Temple
							0	0
"TOP" = time of possession. For other American football terms, see Glossary of American football.							0	0

=== vs Coastal Carolina (Birmingham Bowl) ===
Birmingham Bowl - East Carolina Pirates (7-5) vs Coastal Carolina Chanticleers (9-3)

Quarter	1	2	3	4	Total
Pirates	10	14	14	15	53
Chanticleers	0	14	7	8	29

at Protective Stadium, Birmingham, AL

- Date: December 27
- Game time: 6:45 p.m. EST
- Game weather: -
- Game attendance: -
- Referee: Tuta Salaam
- TV announcers (ESPN/Bowl Season Radio): Tiffany Greene (play-by-play), Jay Walker (analyst), and Jalyn Johnson (sideline reporter)/Travis Jones (play-by-play), John Denton (analyst), and Chad Pilcher (sideline reporter)

Statistics	East Carolina	Coastal Carolina
First downs		
Plays–yards	–	–
Rushes–yards	–	–
Passing yards		
Passing: comp–att–int	––	––
Turnovers		
Time of possession		

Team	Category	Player	Statistics
East Carolina	Passing		
East Carolina	Rushing		
East Carolina	Receiving		
Coastal Carolina	Passing		
Coastal Carolina	Rushing		
Coastal Carolina	Receiving		

Scoring summary

Quarter	Time	Drive			Team	Scoring information	Score	
Quarter	Time	Plays	Yards	TOP	Team	Scoring information	East Carolina	Coastal Carolina
							0	0
"TOP" = time of possession. For other American football terms, see Glossary of American football.							0	0
