= 2022 Houston Cougars football team =

American college football season

2022 Houston Cougars football

Independence Bowl champion

Independence Bowl, W 23–16 vs. Louisiana
- Conference: American Athletic Conference
- Record: 8–5 (5–3 AAC)
- Head coach: Dana Holgorsen (4th season)
- Offensive coordinator: Shannon Dawson (3rd season)
- Co-offensive coordinator: Brandon Jones (4th season)
- Offensive scheme: Spread
- Defensive coordinator: Doug Belk (4th season)
- Base defense: 4–2–5
- Home stadium: TDECU Stadium

2022 American Athletic Conference football standings
	Conf.			Overall
Team	W		L	W		L
No. 9 Tulane y$	7	–	1	12	–	2
UCF y	6	–	2	9	–	5
Cincinnati	6	–	2	9	–	4
SMU	5	–	3	7	–	6
Houston	5	–	3	8	–	5
East Carolina	4	–	4	8	–	5
Navy	4	–	4	4	–	8
Memphis	3	–	5	7	–	6
Tulsa	3	–	5	5	–	7
Temple	1	–	7	3	–	9
South Florida	0	–	8	1	–	11
Championship: Tulane 45, UCF 28
$ – Conference champion; y – Championship game participant; Rankings from AP Poll

The 2022 Houston Cougars football team represented the University of Houston in the 2022 NCAA Division I FBS football season. The Cougars played their home games at TDECU Stadium in Houston, Texas, and competed in the American Athletic Conference (The American). They were led by 4th-year head coach Dana Holgorsen. In September 2021, Houston and fellow conference members Cincinnati and UCF accepted bids to join the Big 12 Conference. The schools had been contractually required to remain with The American through 2024, but all reached a separation agreement that allowed them to join the Big 12 in 2023. Accordingly, the 2022 season was the program's final season as a member of The American.

== Preseason ==
=== Award watch lists ===
Listed in the order that they were released

Award	Player	Position	Year
Maxwell Award	Clayton Tune	QB	Sr.
Maxwell Award	Nathaniel Dell	WR	Jr.
Davey O'Brien Award	Clayton Tune	QB	Sr.
Fred Biletnikoff Award	Nathaniel Dell	WR	Jr.
John Mackey Award	Christian Trahan	TE	Sr.
Butkus Award	Donavan Mutin	LB	Sr.
Jim Thorpe Award	Gervarrius Owens	S	Sr.
Outland Trophy	Patrick Paul	OT	So.
Bronko Nagurski Trophy	Gervarrius Owens	S	Sr.
Ray Guy Award	Laine Wilkins	P	So.
Wuerffel Trophy	Donavan Mutin	LB	Sr.
Chuck Bednarik Award	Gervarrius Owens	S	Sr.
Lombardi Award	Patrick Paul	OT	So.
Earl Campbell Tyler Rose Award	Clayton Tune	QB	Sr.
Manning Award	Clayton Tune	QB	Sr.
Johnny Unitas Golden Arm Award	Clayton Tune	QB	Sr.

=== AAC preseason media poll ===
The American Athletic Conference preseason media poll was released at AAC Media Day on July 28, 2022. The Cougars were picked to win the conference, edging defending conference champion Cincinnati by one vote.

== Schedule ==
Date	Time	Opponent	Rank	Site	TV	Result	Attendance
September 3	2:30 p.m.	at UTSA*	No. 24	Alamodome; San Antonio, TX	CBSSN	W 37–35 ^{3OT}	37,526
September 10	3:00 p.m.	at Texas Tech*	No. 25	Jones AT&T Stadium; Lubbock, TX (rivalry)	FS1	L 30–33 ^{2OT}	56,271
September 17	3:00 p.m.	Kansas*		TDECU Stadium; Houston, TX	ESPNU	L 30–48	30,317
September 24	5:00 p.m.	Rice*		TDECU Stadium; Houston, TX (rivalry)	ESPN+	W 34–27	26,377
September 30	6:00 p.m.	Tulane		TDECU Stadium; Houston, TX	ESPN	L 24–27 ^{OT}	24,319
October 7	6:30 p.m.	at Memphis		Simmons Bank Liberty Stadium; Memphis, TN	ESPN2	W 33–32	28,126
October 22	11:00 a.m.	at Navy		Navy–Marine Corps Memorial Stadium; Annapolis, MD	ESPNU	W 38–20	32,443
October 29	11:00 a.m.	South Florida^{†}		TDECU Stadium; Houston, TX	ESPN2	W 42–27	24,228
November 5	6:00 p.m.	at SMU		Gerald J. Ford Stadium; University Park, TX (rivalry)	NFLN	L 63–77	23,841
November 12	2:00 p.m.	Temple		TDECU Stadium; Houston, TX	ESPN+	W 43–36	21,731
November 19	1:00 p.m.	at East Carolina		Dowdy–Ficklen Stadium; Greenville, NC	ESPN+	W 42–3	42,475
November 26	6:30 p.m.	Tulsa		TDECU Stadium; Houston, TX	ESPNU	L 30–37	21,785
December 23	2:00 p.m.	vs. Louisiana*		Independence Stadium; Shreveport, LA (Independence Bowl)	ESPN	W 23–16	23,410
*Non-conference game; ^{†}Homecoming; Rankings from AP Poll (and CFP Rankings, after November 1) - Released prior to game; All times are in Central time

Schedule Source:

== Game summaries ==
=== At UTSA ===
Houston at UTSA

Team	1	2	3	4	OT	2OT	3OT	Total
• No. 24 Cougars	0	7	0	17	3	8	2	37
Roadrunners	0	14	7	3	3	8	0	35

- Date: September 3, 2022
- Location: Alamodome (San Antonio, TX)
- Game start: 2:37 p.m. CDT
- Elapsed time: 4 hours and 8 minutes
- Game attendance: 37,526
- Game weather: 74 °F (23 °C) • Weather: Indoor
- Referee: Hank Johns
- TV announcers (CBSSN): Rich Waltz (play-by-play), Aaron Taylor (analyst), and Sherree Burruss (sideline)

Scoring summary
2	14:02	HOU	Nathaniel Dell 11-yard pass from Clayton Tune (Bubba Baxa Kick) (11 plays, 58 yards, 5:17)	HOU 7–0
2	12:20	UTSA	Joshua Cephus 51-yard pass from Frank Harris (Jared Sackett Kick) (4 plays, 65 yards, 1:42)	TIE 7–7
2	6:30	UTSA	Frank Harris 38-yard run (Jared Sackett Kick) (9 plays, 80 yards, 2:51)	UTSA 14–7
3	4:12	UTSA	De'Corian Clark 15-yard pass from Frank Harris (Jared Sackett Kick) (10 plays, 73 yards, 3:12)	UTSA 21–7
4	14:54	HOU	Nathaniel Dell 10-yard pass from Clayton Tune (Bubba Baxa Kick) (9 plays, 75 yards, 4:18)	UTSA 21–14
4	12:19	HOU	Joseph Manjack IV 20-yard pass from Clayton Tune (Bubba Baxa Kick) (1 play, 20 yards, 0:07)	TIE 21–21
4	0:23	HOU	Bubba Baxa 35-yard field goal (18 plays, 77 yards, 10:30)	HOU 24–21
4	0:00	UTSA	Jared Sackett 37-yard field goal (6 plays, 55 yards, 0:23)	TIE 24–24
OT		HOU	Bubba Baxa 35-yard field goal (4 plays, 7 yards)	HOU 27–24
OT		UTSA	Jared Sackett 39-yard field goal (4 plays, 3 yards)	TIE 27–27
2OT		HOU	Clayton Tune 1-yard run (Clayton Tune pass to Nathaniel Dell for two-point conversion) (9 plays, 25 yards)	HOU 35–27
2OT		UTSA	De'Corian Clark 13-yard pass from Frank Harris (Frank Harris run for two-point conversion) (5 plays, 25 yards)	TIE 35–35
3OT		HOU	Clayton Tune run for two-point conversion (1 play, 8 yards)	HOU 37–35

Statistics	Houston	UTSA
First downs	20	24
Plays–yards	76–346	73–441
Rushes–yards	44–140	28–104
Passing yards	206	337
Passing: Comp–Att–Int	22–32–0	28–43–1
Time of possession	35:27	24:33

Team	Category	Player	Statistics
Houston	Passing	Clayton Tune	22/32, 206 yards, 3 TDs
Houston	Rushing	Clayton Tune	15 carries, 51 yards, 1 TD
Houston	Receiving	Nathaniel Dell	5 receptions, 50 yards, 2 TDs
UTSA	Passing	Frank Harris	28/43, 337 yards, 3 TDs, 1 INT
UTSA	Rushing	Frank Harris	8 carries, 63 yards, 1 TD
UTSA	Receiving	Joshua Cephus	7 receptions, 106 yards, 1 TD

=== At Texas Tech ===
Houston at Texas Tech

Team	1	2	3	4	OT	2OT	Total
No. 25 Cougars	0	3	7	10	7	3	30
• Red Raiders	3	14	0	3	7	6	33

- Date: September 10, 2022
- Location: Jones AT&T Stadium (Lubbock, TX)
- Game start: 3:05 p.m. CDT
- Elapsed time: 4 hours and 7 minutes
- Game attendance: 56,271
- Game weather: Sunny
- Referee: Luke Richmond
- TV announcers (FS1): Tim Brando (play-by-play) and Spencer Tillman (analyst)

Scoring summary
1	11:26	TTU	Trey Wolff 25-yard field goal (9 plays, 68 yards, 3:34)	TTU 3–0
2	11:17	HOU	Bubba Baxa 24-yard field goal (7 plays, 12 yards, 1:49)	TIE 3–3
2	10:10	TTU	Nehemiah Martinez I 43-yard pass from Donovan Smith (Gino Garcia kick) (4 plays, 65 yards, 1:07)	TTU 10–3
2	0:18	TTU	Myles Price 54-yard pass from Donovan Smith (Gino Garcia kick) (4 plays, 69 yards, 0:41)	TTU 17–3
3	13:24	HOU	Brandon Campbell 2-yard run (Bubba Baxa kick) (4 plays, 67 yards, 1:36)	TTU 17–10
4	12:25	HOU	Jayce Rogers 54-yard interception return (Bubba Baxa kick) (2 plays, 0 yards, 0:16)	TIE 17–17
4	0:37	HOU	Bubba Baxa 35-yard field goal (4 plays, 3 yards, 0:20)	HOU 20–17
4	0:03	TTU	Trey Wolff 47-yard field goal (6 plays, 46 yards, 0:34)	TIE 20–20
OT		HOU	Matthew Golden 15-yard pass from Clayton Tune (Bubba Baxa kick) (5 plays, 25 yards)	HOU 27–20
OT		TTU	Tahj Brooks 4-yard run (Trey Wolff kick) (6 plays, 25 yards)	TIE 27–27
2OT		HOU	Bubba Baxa 20-yard field goal (7 plays, 22 yards)	HOU 30–27
2OT		TTU	Donovan Smith 9-yard run (Trey Wolff kick) (4 plays, 25 yards)	TTU 33–30

Statistics	Houston	Texas Tech
First downs	16	35
Plays–yards	68–354	103–468
Rushes–yards	29–88	44–117
Passing yards	266	351
Passing: Comp–Att–Int	20–39–1	36–59–3
Time of possession	22:42	37:18

Team	Category	Player	Statistics
Houston	Passing	Clayton Tune	20/39, 266 yards, 1 TD, 1 INT
Houston	Rushing	Brandon Campbell	16 carries, 80 yards, 1 TD
Houston	Receiving	Nathaniel Dell	7 receptions, 120 yards
Texas Tech	Passing	Donovan Smith	36/59, 351 yards, 2 TDs, 3 INTs
Texas Tech	Rushing	Tahj Brooks	18 carries, 80 yards, 1 TD
Texas Tech	Receiving	Myles Price	5 receptions, 78 yards, 1 TD

=== Kansas ===
Kansas at Houston

Team	1	2	3	4	Total
• Jayhawks	14	14	14	6	48
Cougars	14	0	13	3	30

- Date: September 17, 2022
- Location: TDECU Stadium (Houston, TX)
- Game start: 3:01 p.m. CDT
- Elapsed time: 4 hours and 29 minutes
- Game attendance: 30,317
- Game weather: 91 °F (33 °C) • Weather: Sunny
- Referee: Tuta Salaam
- TV announcers (ESPNU): Kevin Brown (play-by-play) and Hutson Mason (analyst)

Scoring summary
1	(, , )
1	( , , )
2	(, , )
2	( , , )
3	( , , )
3	( , , )
4	( , , )
4	( , , )
OT	( , , )

Statistics	Kansas	Houston
First downs	24	26
Plays–yards	66–438	70–446
Rushes–yards	43–280	39–174
Passing yards	158	272
Passing: Comp–Att–Int	14–23–0	22–31–1
Time of possession	31:27	28:33

Team	Category	Player	Statistics
Kansas	Passing	Jalon Daniels	14/23, 158 yards, 3 TDs
Kansas	Rushing	Jalon Daniels	12 carries, 123 yards, 2 TDs
Kansas	Receiving	Torry Locklin	1 reception, 60 yards, 1 TD
Houston	Passing	Clayton Tune	22/31, 272 yards, 1 TD, 1 INT
Houston	Rushing	Clayton Tune	16 carries, 63 yards, 1 TD
Houston	Receiving	Ta'Zhawn Henry	5 receptions, 107 yards, 1 TD

=== Rice (Bayou Bucket Classic) ===
Rice at Houston

Team	1	2	3	4	Total
Owls	0	14	10	3	27
• Cougars	7	3	14	10	34

- Date: September 24, 2022
- Location: TDECU Stadium (Houston, TX)
- Game start: 5:02 p.m. CDT
- Elapsed time: 3 hours and 28 minutes
- Game attendance: 26,377
- Game weather: 94 °F (34 °C) • Weather: Sunny
- Referee: Rodney Burnette
- TV announcers (ESPN+): Ted Emrich (play-by-play) and Taylor McHargue (analyst)

Scoring summary
1	(, , )
1	( , , )
2	(, , )
2	( , , )
3	( , , )
3	( , , )
4	( , , )
4	( , , )
OT	( , , )

Statistics	Rice	Houston
First downs	22	19
Plays–yards	65–424	58–427
Rushes–yards	25–90	32–178
Passing yards	334	249
Passing: Comp–Att–Int	25–40–1	19–26–1
Time of possession	29:55	30:05

Team	Category	Player	Statistics
Rice	Passing	T. J. McMahon	25/39, 334 yards, 1 TD, 1 INT
Rice	Rushing	Kobie Campbell	1 carry, 34 yards
Rice	Receiving	Bradley Rozner	5 receptions, 123 yards
Houston	Passing	Clayton Tune	19/26, 249 yards, 2 TDs, 1 INT
Houston	Rushing	Ta'Zhawn Henry	17 carries, 112 yards, 1 TD
Houston	Receiving	Nathaniel Dell	7 receptions, 134 yards, 1 TD

=== Tulane ===
Tulane at Houston

Team	1	2	3	4	OT	Total
• Green Wave	0	7	7	7	6	27
Cougars	0	7	0	14	3	24

- Date: September 30, 2022
- Location: TDECU Stadium (Houston, TX)
- Game start: 6:05 p.m. CDT
- Elapsed time: 3 hours and 15 minutes
- Game attendance: 24,319
- Game weather: 82 °F (28 °C) • Weather: Sunny
- Referee: Tim Rich
- TV announcers (ESPN): Beth Mowins (play-by-play), Kirk Morrison (analyst), and Stormy Buonantony (sideline)

Scoring summary
1	(, , )
1	( , , )
2	(, , )
2	( , , )
3	( , , )
3	( , , )
4	( , , )
4	( , , )
OT	( , , )

Statistics	Tulane	Houston
First downs	14	22
Plays–yards	54–273	81–383
Rushes–yards	28–84	48–175
Passing yards	189	208
Passing: Comp–Att–Int	16–26–0	22–33–0
Time of possession	23:05	36:55

Team	Category	Player	Statistics
Tulane	Passing	Kai Horton	11/21, 132 yards, 3 TDs
Tulane	Rushing	Tyjae Spears	14 carries, 54 yards
Tulane	Receiving	Tyjae Spears	6 receptions, 85 yards, 1 TD
Houston	Passing	Clayton Tune	22/33, 208 yards, 2 TDs
Houston	Rushing	Brandon Campbell	19 carries, 66 yards, 1 TD
Houston	Receiving	Nathaniel Dell	8 receptions, 73 yards, 2 TDs

=== At Memphis ===
Houston at Memphis

Team	1	2	3	4	Total
• Cougars	0	7	0	26	33
Tigers	14	3	3	12	32

- Date: October 7, 2022
- Location: Simmons Bank Liberty Stadium (Memphis, TN)
- Game start: 6:30 p.m. CDT
- Elapsed time: 3 hours and 41 minutes
- Game attendance: 28,126
- Game weather: 72 °F (22 °C) • Weather: Sunny • Wind: N 10 MPH
- Referee: Hank Johns
- TV announcers (ESPN2): Roy Philpott (play-by-play), Andre Ware (analyst), and Paul Carcaterra (sideline)

Scoring summary
1	(, , )
1	( , , )
2	(, , )
2	( , , )
3	( , , )
3	( , , )
4	( , , )
4	( , , )
OT	( , , )

Statistics	Houston	Memphis
First downs	25	25
Plays–yards	80–463	75–438
Rushes–yards	23–97	41–156
Passing yards	366	282
Passing: Comp–Att–Int	36–57–1	21–32–0
Time of possession	26:22	33:38

Team	Category	Player	Statistics
Houston	Passing	Clayton Tune	36/57, 366 yards, 3 TDs, 1 INT
Houston	Rushing	Brandon Campbell	12 carries, 53 yards
Houston	Receiving	Sam Brown	9 receptions, 116 yards
Memphis	Passing	Seth Henigan	21/32, 241 yards, 1 TD
Memphis	Rushing	Jevyon Ducker	10 carries, 38 yards
Memphis	Receiving	Gabriel Rogers	5 receptions, 71 yards

=== At Navy ===
Houston at Navy

Team	1	2	3	4	Total
• Cougars	14	7	10	7	38
Midshipmen	0	7	7	6	20

- Date: October 22, 2022
- Location: Navy–Marine Corps Memorial Stadium (Annapolis, MD)
- Game start: 11:07 a.m. CDT
- Elapsed time: 3 hours and 22 minutes
- Game attendance: 32,443
- Game weather: 62 °F (17 °C) • Weather: Sunny
- Referee: Tim Rich
- TV announcers (ESPNU): Clay Matvick (play-by-play), Rocky Boiman (analyst), and Dawn Davenport (sideline)

Scoring summary
1	12:06	HOU	Nathaniel Dell 6-yard pass from Clayton Tune (Kyle Ramsey kick) (7 plays, 76 yards, 2:54)	HOU 7–0
1	5:29	HOU	Nathaniel Dell 11-yard pass from Clayton Tune (Kyle Ramsey kick) (7 play, 35 yards, 2:33)	HOU 14–0
2	10:20	NAVY	Daba Fofana 25-yard run (Daniel Davies kick) (4 plays, 80 yards, 1:21)	HOU 14–7
2	5:18	HOU	Matt Byrnes 3-yard pass from Clayton Tune (Kyle Ramsey kick) (9 plays, 75 yards, 5:02)	HOU 21–7
3	10:16	NAVY	Jianni Woodson-Brooks 5-yard fumble return (Daniel Davies kick) (1 play, -25 yards, 0:49)	HOU 21–14
3	6:25	HOU	Kyle Ramsey 24-yard field goal (10 plays, 68 yards, 3:51)	HOU 24–14
3	1:36	HOU	Sam Brown 7-yard pass from Clayton Tune (Kyle Ramsey kick) (5 plays, 17 yards, 2:45)	HOU 31–14
4	4:56	HOU	Sam Brown 4-yard pass from Clayton Tune (Kyle Ramsey kick) (9 plays, 63 yards, 4:49)	HOU 38–14
4	2:28	NAVY	Jayden Umbarger 41-yard pass from Tai Lavatai (Two-point run conversion failed) (7 plays, 64 yards, 2:28)	HOU 38–20

Statistics	Houston	Navy
First downs	23	16
Plays–yards	64–441	63–326
Rushes–yards	34–180	50–201
Passing yards	261	125
Passing: Comp–Att–Int	21–30–0	6–13–2
Time of possession	28:12	31:48

Team	Category	Player	Statistics
Houston	Passing	Clayton Tune	21/30, 261 yards, 5 TDs
Houston	Rushing	Stacy Sneed	20 carries, 100 yards
Houston	Receiving	Nathaniel Dell	8 receptions, 93 yards, 2 TDs
Navy	Passing	Tai Lavatai	6/13, 125 yards, 1 TD, 2 INTs
Navy	Rushing	Daba Fofana	20 carries, 89 yards, 1 TD
Navy	Receiving	Jayden Umbarger	2 receptions, 93 yards, 1 TD

=== South Florida ===
South Florida at Houston

Team	1	2	3	4	Total
Bulls	14	0	7	6	27
• Cougars	14	14	7	7	42

- Date: October 29, 2022
- Location: TDECU Stadium (Houston, TX)
- Game start: 11:01 a.m. CDT
- Elapsed time: 3 hours and 10 minutes
- Game attendance: 24,228
- Game weather: 61 °F (16 °C) • Weather: Cloudy
- Referee: Nate Black
- TV announcers (ESPN2): Beth Mowins (play-by-play), Kirk Morrison (analyst), and Stormy Buonantony (sideline)

Scoring summary
1	(, , )
1	( , , )
2	(, , )
2	( , , )
3	( , , )
3	( , , )
4	( , , )
4	( , , )
OT	( , , )

Statistics	South Florida	Houston
First downs	25	23
Plays–yards	65–429	64–490
Rushes–yards	31–154	25–103
Passing yards	275	387
Passing: Comp–Att–Int	24–34–0	33–39–0
Time of possession	29:53	30:07

Team	Category	Player	Statistics
South Florida	Passing	Katravis Marsh	24/34, 275 yards, 1 TD
South Florida	Rushing	Brian Battie	12 carries, 106 yards, 2 TDs
South Florida	Receiving	Xavier Weaver	7 receptions, 84 yards
Houston	Passing	Clayton Tune	31/37, 380 yards, 4 TDs
Houston	Rushing	Stacy Sneed	10 carries, 60 yards, 2 TDs
Houston	Receiving	Nathaniel Dell	9 receptions, 112 yards, 2 TDs

=== At SMU ===
Houston at SMU

Team	1	2	3	4	Total
Cougars	14	21	14	14	63
• Mustangs	21	35	7	14	77

- Date: November 5, 2022
- Location: Gerald J. Ford Stadium (University Park, TX)
- Game start: 6:03 CDT
- Elapsed time: 3 hours and 55 minutes
- Game attendance: 23,841
- Game weather: Sunny, 64 °F (18 °C)
- Referee: Luke Richmond
- TV announcers (NFLN): Jason Ross, Jr. (play-by-play) and Tyoka Jackson (analyst)

Scoring summary
1	(, , )
1	( , , )
2	(, , )
2	( , , )
3	( , , )
3	( , , )
4	( , , )
4	( , , )
OT	( , , )

Statistics	Houston	SMU
First downs	34	31
Plays–yards	71–710	83–642
Rushes–yards	17–182	46–263
Passing yards	528	379
Passing: Comp–Att–Int	37–54–3	28–37–0
Time of possession	28:28	31:32

Team	Category	Player	Statistics
Houston	Passing	Clayton Tune	36/53, 527 yards, 7 TDs, 3 INTs
Houston	Rushing	Clayton Tune	12 rushes, 111 yards, 1 TD
Houston	Receiving	Nathaniel Dell	13 receptions, 180 yards, 2 TDs
SMU	Passing	Tanner Mordecai	28/37, 379 yards, 9 TDs
SMU	Rushing	Tyler Lavine	25 rushes, 146 yards, 1 TD
SMU	Receiving	Dylan Goffney	3 receptions, 100 yards, 1 TD

=== Temple ===
Temple at Houston

Team	1	2	3	4	Total
Owls	7	12	7	10	36
• Cougars	0	14	14	15	43

- Date: November 12, 2022
- Location: TDECU Stadium (Houston, TX)
- Game start: 2:02 p.m. CDT
- Elapsed time: 3 hours and 22 minutes
- Game attendance: 21,731
- Game weather: 59 °F (15 °C) • Weather: Sunny
- Referee: Edwin Lee
- TV announcers (ESPN+): Richard Cross (play-by-play) and Taylor McHargue (analyst)

Scoring summary
1	(, , )
1	( , , )
2	(, , )
2	( , , )
3	( , , )
3	( , , )
4	( , , )
4	( , , )
OT	( , , )

Statistics	Temple	Houston
First downs	33	25
Plays–yards	85–533	66–485
Rushes–yards	26–47	26–196
Passing yards	486	289
Passing: Comp–Att–Int	42–59–0	29–40–1
Time of possession	31:44	28:16

Team	Category	Player	Statistics
Temple	Passing	E.J. Warner	42/59, 486 yards, 3 TDs
Temple	Rushing	Darvon Hubbard	4 carries, 26 yards
Temple	Receiving	Jose Barbon	8 receptions, 128 yards
Houston	Passing	Clayton Tune	29/40, 289 yards, 3 TDs, 1 INT
Houston	Rushing	Stacy Sneed	11 carries, 143 yards
Houston	Receiving	Nathaniel Dell	12 receptions, 98 yards, 1 TD

=== At East Carolina ===
Houston at East Carolina

Team	1	2	3	4	Total
• Cougars	7	14	14	7	42
Pirates	0	0	3	0	3

- Date: November 19, 2022
- Location: Dowdy–Ficklen Stadium (Greenville, NC)
- Game start: 1:00 p.m. CDT
- Elapsed time: 3 hours and 15 minutes
- Game attendance: 42,475
- Game weather: 56 °F (13 °C) • Weather: Sunny • N 2 MPH
- Referee: Kevin Randall
- TV announcers (ESPN+): Richard Cross (play-by-play) and Taylor McHargue (analyst)

Scoring summary
1	(, , )
1	( , , )
2	(, , )
2	( , , )
3	( , , )
3	( , , )
4	( , , )
4	( , , )
OT	( , , )

Statistics	Houston	East Carolina
First downs	27	13
Plays–yards	68–515	57–315
Rushes–yards	24–80	22–118
Passing yards	435	197
Passing: Comp–Att–Int	32–44–1	17–35–0
Time of possession	30:42	29:18

Team	Category	Player	Statistics
Houston	Passing	Clayton Tune	32/44, 435 yards, 4 TDs, 1 INT
Houston	Rushing	Clayton Tune	6 carries, 43 yards
Houston	Receiving	Nathaniel Dell	9 receptions, 176 yards, 1 TD
East Carolina	Passing	Holton Ahlers	15/30, 182 yards
East Carolina	Rushing	Keaton Mitchell	14 carries, 129 yards
East Carolina	Receiving	Jsi Hatfield	2 receptions, 68 yards

=== Tulsa ===
Tulsa at Houston

Team	1	2	3	4	Total
• Golden Hurricane	3	17	7	10	37
Cougars	14	10	3	3	30

- Date: November 26, 2022
- Location: TDECU Stadium (Houston, TX)
- Game start: 6:35 p.m. CDT
- Elapsed time: 3 hours and 35 minutes
- Game attendance: 21,785
- Game weather: 59 °F (15 °C)
- Referee: Hank Johns
- TV announcers (ESPNU): Beth Mowins (play-by-play), Kirk Morrison (analyst), and Stormy Buonantony (sideline reporter)

Scoring summary
1	(, , )
1	( , , )
2	(, , )
2	( , , )
3	( , , )
3	( , , )
4	( , , )
4	( , , )
OT	( , , )

Statistics	Tulsa	Houston
First downs	19	24
Plays–yards	75–431	70–506
Rushes–yards	32–115	23–120
Passing yards	316	386
Passing: Comp–Att–Int	25–43–0	26–47–1
Time of possession	29:37	30:23

Team	Category	Player	Statistics
Tulsa	Passing	Braylon Braxton	25/43, 316 yards, 3 TDs
Tulsa	Rushing	Braylon Braxton	11 carries, 51 yards, 1 TD
Tulsa	Receiving	JuanCarlos Santana	6 receptions, 169 yards, 2 TDs
Houston	Passing	Clayton Tune	26/47, 386 yards, 2 TDs, 1 INT
Houston	Rushing	Ta'Zhawn Henry	9 carries, 54 yards
Houston	Receiving	Nathaniel Dell	9 receptions, 161 yards, 1 TD

=== Vs. Louisiana (Independence Bowl) ===
Houston vs. Louisiana

Team	1	2	3	4	Total
• Cougars	0	6	7	10	23
Ragin' Cajuns	7	9	0	0	16

- Date: December 23, 2022
- Location: Independence Stadium
  Shreveport, LA
- Game start: 2:00 p.m. CDT
- Elapsed time: 3 hours and 36 minutes
- Game attendance: 23,410
- Game weather: 25 °F (−4 °C) • Weather: Sunny • Wind: NW 15 MPH
- Referee: Scott Hardin
- TV announcers (ESPN/Bowl Season Radio): Dave Neal (play–by–play), Deuce McAllister (analyst), and Harry Lyles, Jr. (sideline reporter)/Brian Estridge (play-by-play), Justin Fuente (analyst), and David Beaudin (sideline reporter)

Scoring summary
1	07:39	LA	Johnny Lumpkin 4-yard pass from Chandler Fields (Kenneth Almendares kick) (15 plays, 75 yards, 7:21)	LA 7–0
2	09:35	LA	Kenneth Almendares 42-yard field goal (7 plays, 39 yards, 3:43)	LA 10–0
2	07:05	LA	Kenneth Almendares 42-yard field goal (4 plays, 3 yards, 0:58)	LA 13–0
2	03:00	HOU	KeSean Carter 33-yard pass from Clayton Tune (Kyle Ramsey PAT failed) (9 plays, 80 yards, 3:59)	LA 13–6
2	00:02	LA	Kenneth Almendares 32-yard field goal (13 plays, 83 yards, 2:51)	LA 16–6
3	09:21	HOU	Nathaniel Dell 2-yard pass from Clayton Tune (Kyle Ramsey kick) (13 plays, 70 yards, 5:33)	LA 16–13
4	13:40	HOU	Kyle Ramsey 19-yard field goal (8 plays, 31 yards, 4:02)	TIE 16–16
4	00:20	HOU	Nathaniel Dell 12-yard pass from Clayton Tune (Kyle Ramsey kick) (6 plays, 92 yards, 2:39)	HOU 23–16

Statistics	Houston	Louisiana
First downs	21	21
Total yards	363	323
Rushing yards	139	129
Passing yards	224	194
Turnovers	0	3
Time of possession	30:19	29:41

Team	Category	Player	Statistics
Houston	Passing	Clayton Tune	19/28, 224 yards, 3 TDs
Houston	Rushing	Clayton Tune	11 carries, 55 yards
Houston	Receiving	KeSean Carter	4 receptions, 112 yards, 1 TD
Louisiana	Passing	Chandler Fields	17/25, 169 yards, 1 TD
Louisiana	Rushing	Chris Smith	14 carries, 48 yards
Louisiana	Receiving	Lance Legendre	5 receptions, 56 yards

== Rankings ==
Ranking movements Legend: ██ Increase in ranking ██ Decrease in ranking — = Not ranked RV = Received votes
	Week															
Poll	Pre	1	2	3	4	5	6	7	8	9	10	11	12	13	14	Final
AP	24	25	—	—	—	—	—	—	—	—	—	—	—	—	—	—
Coaches	25	RV	RV	—	—	—	—	—	—	—	—	—	—	—	—	—
CFP	Not released									—	—	—	—	—	—	Not released
