= 2022 Temple Owls football team =

American college football season

2022 Temple Owls football
- Conference: American Athletic Conference
- Record: 3–9 (1–7 AAC)
- Head coach: Stan Drayton (1st season)
- Offensive coordinator: Danny Langsdorf (1st season)
- Offensive scheme: Pro-style
- Defensive coordinator: D. J. Eliot (1st season)
- Base defense: 4–3
- Home stadium: Lincoln Financial Field

2022 American Athletic Conference football standings
	Conf.			Overall
Team	W		L	W		L
No. 9 Tulane y$	7	–	1	12	–	2
UCF y	6	–	2	9	–	5
Cincinnati	6	–	2	9	–	4
SMU	5	–	3	7	–	6
Houston	5	–	3	8	–	5
East Carolina	4	–	4	8	–	5
Navy	4	–	4	4	–	8
Memphis	3	–	5	7	–	6
Tulsa	3	–	5	5	–	7
Temple	1	–	7	3	–	9
South Florida	0	–	8	1	–	11
Championship: Tulane 45, UCF 28
$ – Conference champion; y – Championship game participant; Rankings from AP Poll

The 2022 Temple Owls football team represented Temple University in the 2022 NCAA Division I FBS football season. They played their home games at Lincoln Financial Field in Philadelphia, Pennsylvania, and were led by 1st-year head coach Stan Drayton, competing as a member of the American Athletic Conference (The American).

== Preseason ==
New athletic director Arthur Johnson fired Rod Carey after three years on the job due to underperforming results. Texas associate head coach and running backs coach Stan Drayton was hired as his replacement.

== Schedule ==
Date	Time	Opponent	Site	TV	Result	Attendance
September 2	7:30 p.m.	at Duke*	Wallace Wade Stadium; Durham, NC	ACCN	L 0–30	20,722
September 10	2:00 p.m.	Lafayette*	Lincoln Financial Field; Philadelphia, PA	ESPN+	W 30–14	18,430
September 17	2:00 p.m.	Rutgers*	Lincoln Financial Field; Philadelphia, PA	ESPN+	L 14–16	33,297
September 24	2:00 p.m.	UMass*	Lincoln Financial Field; Philadelphia, PA	ESPN+	W 28–0	14,033
October 1	12:00 p.m.	at Memphis	Liberty Bowl Memorial Stadium; Memphis, TN	ESPNU	L 3–24	23,239
October 13	7:00 p.m.	at UCF	FBC Mortgage Stadium; Orlando, FL	ESPN	L 13–70	41,729
October 21	7:30 p.m.	Tulsa	Lincoln Financial Field; Philadelphia, PA	ESPN2	L 16–27	13,607
October 29	3:30 p.m.	at Navy	Navy–Marine Corps Memorial Stadium; Annapolis, MD	CBSSN	L 20–27 ^{OT}	31,141
November 5	2:00 p.m.	South Florida	Lincoln Financial Field; Philadelphia, PA	ESPN+	W 54–28	13,862
November 12	2:00 p.m.	at Houston	TDECU Stadium; Houston, TX	ESPN+	L 36–43	21,731
November 19	4:00 p.m.	No. 25 Cincinnati	Lincoln Financial Field; Philadelphia, PA	ESPNU	L 3–23	14,673
November 26	1:00 p.m.	East Carolina	Lincoln Financial Field; Philadelphia, PA	ESPN+	L 46–49	13,037
*Non-conference game; Rankings from AP Poll (and CFP Rankings, after November 1) - Released prior to game; All times are in Eastern time

== Game summaries ==
=== At Duke ===
	1	2	3	4	Total
Owls	0	0	0	0	0
Blue Devils	10	14	3	3	30

=== Lafayette ===
	1	2	3	4	Total
Leopards	7	0	7	0	14
Owls	7	14	0	9	30

=== Rutgers ===
	1	2	3	4	Total
Owls	7	0	0	7	14
Scarlet Knights	3	7	3	3	16

=== UMass ===
	1	2	3	4	Total
Minutemen	0	0	0	0	0
Owls	0	7	14	7	28

=== At Memphis ===
Temple Owls (2-2) vs Memphis Tigers (3-1)

Quarter	1	2	3	4	Total
Owls	0	3	0	0	3
Tigers	0	0	7	17	24

at Simmons Bank Liberty Stadium, Memphis, TN

- Date: October 1st
- Game time: 12:00 p.m.
- Game weather: 69 °F (21 °C) • Weather: Sunny • Wind: N 6 MPH
- Game attendance: 23,239
- Referee: Steve Anderson
- TV announcers (ESPNU): John Schriffen (play-by-play) & Rocky Boiman (analyst)

Statistics	Temple	Memphis
First downs	7	22
Plays–yards	59–297	89–331
Rushes–yards	22–52	44–136
Passing yards	245	195
Passing: comp–att–int	18–37–3	24–45–0
Time of possession	25:31	34:29

Team	Category	Player	Statistics
Temple	Passing	E.J. Warner	18/37, 245 yards, 3 INT
Temple	Rushing	Jakari Norwood	4 carries, 18 yards
Temple	Receiving	Jose Barbom	5 receptions, 134 yards
Memphis	Passing	Seth Henigan	24/45, 195 yards, 1 TD
Memphis	Rushing	Seth Henigan	19 carries, 60 yards
Memphis	Receiving	Caden Prieskorn	3 receptions, 40 yards, 1 TD

Scoring summary

Quarter	Time	Drive			Team	Scoring information	Score	
Quarter	Time	Plays	Yards	TOP	Team	Scoring information	Temple	Memphis
							0	0
"TOP" = time of possession. For other American football terms, see Glossary of American football.							0	0

=== At UCF ===
	1	2	3	4	Total
Owls	10	3	0	0	13
Knights	14	21	21	14	70

=== Tulsa ===
	1	2	3	4	Total
Golden Hurricane	0	14	0	13	27
Owls	10	0	0	6	16

=== At Navy ===
Temple Owls at Navy Midshipmen

Team	1	2	3	4	Total
Owls	0	3	7	10	20
• Midshipmen	13	7	7	7	34

- Date: October 29, 2022
- Location: Navy-Marine Corps Memorial Stadium
  Annapolis, MD
- Game start: 3:30 p.m.
- Elapsed time: 3 hours, 38 minutes
- Game attendance: 31,141
- Game weather: 60 °F (16 °C) • Weather: Sunny • Wind: NE 10 MPH
- Referee: Hank Johns
- TV announcers (CBSSN): John Sadak (play-by-play), Randy Cross (analyst), & Sheehan Stanwick Burch (sideline)

Scoring summary
1	6:45	NAVY	Daniel Davies 31–yard field goal (14 plays, 34 yards, 7:39)	NAVY 3–0
1	2:53	NAVY	Daba Fofana 15–yard run (Daniel Davies kick) (3 play, 17 yards, 1:08)	NAVY 10–0
1	0:39	NAVY	Daniel Davies 36–yard field goal (4 play, 6 yards, 2:05)	NAVY 13–0
2	3:38	TEMPLE	Camden Price 38-yard field goal (11 plays, 50 yards, 3:46)	NAVY 13–3
3	13:49	TEMPLE	Layton Jordan 0–yard fumble return (Camden Price kick) (1 play, 0 yards, 1:11)	NAVY 13–10
3	0:51	NAVY	Anton Hall Jr. 16–yard run (Daniel Davies kick) (12 plays, 56 yards, 6:44)	NAVY 20–10
4	9:45	TEMPLE	Amad Anderson Jr. 20–yard pass from E.J. Warner (Camden Price kick) (6 play, 70 yards, 2:22)	NAVY 20–17
4	1:08	TEMPLE	Camden Price 22–yard field goal (9 play, 66 yards, 1:23)	TIE 20–20
OT	0:00	NAVY	Xavier Arline 23–yard run (Daniel Davies kick) (2 plays, 25 yards, 0:00)	NAVY 27–20

Statistics	Temple	Navy
First downs	14	12
Plays–yards	68–288	72–224
Rushes–yards	20–20	70–224
Passing yards	268	0
Passing: comp–att–int	24–48–2	0–2–0
Time of possession	22:51	37:09

Team	Category	Player	Statistics
Temple	Passing	E. J. Warner	24/48, 268 yards, 1 TD, 2 INT
Temple	Rushing	Edward Saydee	14 carries, 61 yards
Temple	Receiving	Amad Anderson Jr.	8 receptions, 114 yards, 1 TD
Navy	Passing	Tai Lavatai	0/1, 0 yards
Navy	Rushing	Daba Fofana	24 carries, 63 yards, 1 TD
Navy	Receiving		

=== South Florida ===
	1	2	3	4	Total
Bulls	7	7	14	0	28
Owls	3	13	17	21	54

=== At Houston ===
Temple at Houston

Team	1	2	3	4	Total
Owls	7	12	7	10	36
• Cougars	0	14	14	15	43

- Date: November 12, 2022
- Location: TDECU Stadium (Houston, TX)
- Game start: 2:02 p.m. CDT
- Elapsed time: 3 hours and 22 minutes
- Game attendance: 21,731
- Game weather: 59 °F (15 °C) • Weather: Sunny
- Referee: Edwin Lee
- TV announcers (ESPN+): Richard Cross (play-by-play) & Taylor McHargue (analyst)

Scoring summary
1	(, , )
1	( , , )
2	(, , )
2	( , , )
3	( , , )
3	( , , )
4	( , , )
4	( , , )
OT	( , , )

Statistics	Temple	Houston
First downs	33	25
Plays–yards	85–533	66–485
Rushes–yards	26–47	26–196
Passing yards	486	289
Passing: Comp–Att–Int	42–59–0	29–40–1
Time of possession	31:44	28:16

Team	Category	Player	Statistics
Temple	Passing	E.J. Warner	42/59, 486 yards, 3 TDs
Temple	Rushing	Darvon Hubbard	4 carries, 26 yards
Temple	Receiving	Jose Barbon	8 receptions, 128 yards
Houston	Passing	Clayton Tune	29/40, 289 yards, 3 TDs, 1 INT
Houston	Rushing	Stacy Sneed	11 carries, 143 yards
Houston	Receiving	Nathaniel Dell	12 receptions, 98 yards, 1 TD

=== Cincinnati ===
Game Eleven – Cincinnati Bearcats at Temple Owls

Quarter	1	2	3	4	Total
No. 25 Bearcats	7	10	3	3	23
Owls	0	3	0	0	3

at Lincoln Financial Field • Philadelphia, Pennsylvania

- Date: Saturday, November 19, 2022
- Game time: 4:00 p.m. EST
- Game weather: Sunny
- Game attendance: 14,673
- Referee: Nate Black
- TV announcers (ESPNU): Noah Reed (play-by-play) & Rene Ingoglia (analyst)

Game information

First quarter

- CIN TD 1:19 Tre Tucker 42 Yd pass from Ben Bryant (Ryan Coe Kick) 4 plays, 66 yards, 1:08 UC 7–0

Second quarter

- CIN TD 14:54 Ryan Montgomery 14 Yd Run (Ryan Coe Kick) 3 plays, 26 yards, 0:44 UC 14–0
- CIN FG 9:55 Ryan Coe 28 Yd Field Goal 9 plays, 28 yards, 2:54 UC 17–0
- TEM FG 8:24 Camden Price 43 Yd Field Goal 6 plays, 50 yards, 1:31 UC 17–3

Third quarter

- CIN FG 7:22 Ryan Coe 37 Yd Field Goal 8 plays, 23 yards, 3:25 UC 20–3

Fourth quarter

- CIN FG 14:40 Ryan Coe 24 Yd Field Goal 12 plays, 74 yards, 5:29 UC 23–3

Statistics	CIN	TEM
First downs	22	13
Plays–yards	78–388	55–202
Rushes–yards	43–131	19–35
Passing yards	257	167
Passing: comp–att–int	21–35	21–36–2
Time of possession	36:51	23:09

Team	Category	Player	Statistics
Cincinnati	Passing	Ben Bryant	9–18, 130 yards, 1 TD
Cincinnati	Rushing	Ryan Montgomery	14 carries, 58 yards, 1 TD
Cincinnati	Receiving	Tre Tucker	4 receptions, 78 yards, 1 TD
Temple	Passing	E.J. Warner	21–36, 167 yards, 2 INT
Temple	Rushing	Darvon Hubbard	7 carries, 30 yards
Temple	Receiving	Jordan Smith	5 receptions, 40 yards

=== East Carolina ===
	1	2	3	4	Total
Pirates	7	21	14	7	49
Owls	3	21	15	7	46

== Personnel ==
Name	Position	Consecutive season at Temple in current position
Stan Drayton	Head coach	1st
Danny Langsdorf	Offensive coordinator/quarterbacks coach	1st
D. J. Eliot	Defensive coordinator	1st
Adam Scheier	Special teams coordinator/Tight end coach	1st
Chris Wiesehan	Offensive line coach/Run Game coordinator	1st
Jafar Williams	Wide receivers coach/Pass Game coordinator	1st
Marvin Clecidor	Safeties coach	1st
Preston Brown	Running backs coach	1st
Jules Montinar	Cornerbacks coach	1st
Antoine Smith	Defensive line coach	1st
Chris Woods	Linebackers coach	1st
Chris Fenelon	Strength and conditioning	1st
Everett Withers	Chief of Staff to Head Coach	1st
