= Jeff Scott =

American football player and coach (born 1980)

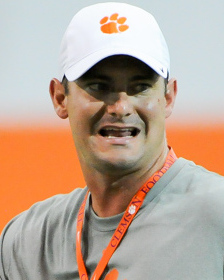
- Scott in 2015

Biographical details
- Born: December 28, 1980 (age 45); Arcadia, Florida, U.S.

Playing career
- 2000–2002: Clemson
- Positions: Wide receiver, special teams

Coaching career (HC unless noted)
- 2006: Blythewood HS (SC)
- 2007: Presbyterian (WR)
- 2008: Clemson (WR)
- 2008–2014: Clemson (WR/RC)
- 2015–2019: Clemson (co-OC/WR)
- 2020–2022: South Florida

Head coaching record
- Overall: 4–26 (college); 14–1 (high school)

Jeffrey Bradford Scott (born December 28, 1980) is an American former football coach. He served as the head football coach at the University of South Florida from 2020 to 2022.

== Playing career ==
Born in Arcadia, Florida, Scott later lived in Seneca, South Carolina and graduated from the Hammond School in Columbia, South Carolina in 1999. He played quarterback on the football team and was also an outfielder and pitcher on the baseball team in high school. Scott played college football at Clemson University under head coach Tommy Bowden. He lettered three years (2000–2002) as a wide receiver. He also played special teams for most of his playing career, serving as the holder for place kicks. He participated in three bowl games while playing at Clemson: the 2001 Gator Bowl, 2001 Humanitarian Bowl, and 2002 Tangerine Bowl.

== Coaching career ==
=== Early career ===
Scott started his coaching career as the head football coach for Blythewood High School in Blythewood, South Carolina in 2006. He won a state title in his first and only year, at age 25. This was Blythewood's football program's inaugural year as well. It is believed to be the first time in South Carolina high school football history that a first-year head football coach led his program to a state title in its first year of fielding a team. After one year coaching at the high school level, he then served as wide receivers coach for the Presbyterian Blue Hose in 2007.

=== Clemson ===
He made his return to Clemson in 2008 as a graduate assistant on Tommy Bowden's staff. When Dabo Swinney took over as interim head coach midway through the 2008 season he was promoted to coach wide receivers, the position that had been held by coach Swinney. He was promoted to head of recruiting in December 2008 when Dabo Swinney was given the full-time position. In December 2014, he was named co-offensive coordinator to replace outgoing offensive coordinator Chad Morris, who left to take over as head coach of the SMU football program. He shared coordinator duties with Clemson's running back's coach and former teammate, Tony Elliott. Former Clemson teammate Brandon Streeter was hired to take over recruiting coordinator duties as well as to coach quarterbacks.

Clemson's football team won the national championship in January 2017, beating Alabama, with Scott and Elliott as offensive coordinators for the game.

=== South Florida ===
Scott was hired as the fifth head football coach in University of South Florida history on December 9, 2019, becoming the youngest head football coach in the American Athletic Conference. He signed a five-year deal worth $12.5 million dollars. In his inaugural game as head coach, the Bulls beat The Citadel, 27–6. Despite this early victory, the Bulls lost their remaining games and ended the season 1–8.

In 2021, Scott and the Bulls won only two games, defeating Florida A&M, 38–17, and Temple, 34–14. Following the season, Scott received a two-year contract extension. Athletic director Michael Kelly cited continuity as key to the future success of the program in this decision.

South Florida fired Scott on November 6, 2022. Special teams coordinator Daniel Da Prato served as interim head coach for the final three games 2022 season. In Scott's three seasons as head coach, he compiled a record of 4–26, with three of four wins coming against NCAA Division I Football Championship Subdivision (FCS) opponents. The lone win against an FBS opponent was against a three-win Temple team in 2021. As of 2022, his win percentage (.133) ranks last in program history amongst head coaches.

== Head coaching record ==
=== College ===
Year	Team	Overall	Conference	Standing	Bowl/playoffs
South Florida Bulls (American Athletic Conference) (2020–2022)
2020	South Florida	1–8	0–7	11th	
2021	South Florida	2–10	1–7	T–9th	
2022	South Florida	1–8 (Note: South Florida fired Scott with three games remaining)	0–5		
South Florida:		4–26	1–19		
Total:		4–26			

=== High school ===
Year	Team	Overall	Conference	Standing	Bowl/playoffs
Blythewood Bengals () (2006)
2006	Blythewood	14–1	7–0	1st	
Blythewood:		14–1	7–0		
Total:		14–1			
National championship Conference title Conference division title or championship game berth

== Personal life ==
Scott graduated with a bachelor's degree in secondary education from Clemson University in 2003. He is married to the former Sara McDaniel. He is the son of Brad Scott, former South Carolina Gamecocks football head coach and longtime Clemson assistant coach. His younger brother, John Scott, who Jeff often refers to as his "hero", is a trauma surgeon who trained at Harvard and at Harborview Medical Center in Seattle, and is now an assistant professor of surgery at the University of Michigan.
