= Daniel Da Prato =

American football coach (born 1981)

Current position
- Title: Special teams coordinator
- Team: Minnesota
- Conference: Big 10

Biographical details
- Born: October 2, 1981 (age 45); Sacramento, California, U.S.

Playing career
- 2000: New Mexico Highlands
- 2001: Chabot
- 2002–2003: Louisiana–Monroe
- Position: Quarterback

Coaching career (HC unless noted)
- 2004–2005: Louisiana–Monroe (GA)
- 2006: Louisiana–Monroe (DFO)
- 2007–2009: Sacramento State (WR)
- 2010–2012: Sacramento State (WR/ST)
- 2013–2015: Montana State (ST/TE)
- 2016–2018: Colorado (QC/offense)
- 2019: Arkansas (STQC)
- 2020–2022: South Florida (ST)
- 2022: South Florida (interim HC)
- 2023–2024: Texas State (ST/AHC)
- 2025: New Mexico (ST/AHC)
- 2026–present: Minnesota (ST)

Head coaching record
- Overall: 0–3

Daniel Da Prato (born October 2, 1981) is an American football coach and former player. He is the special teams coordinator at the University of Minnesota. He was the interim head football coach at University of South Florida for the final three games of the 2022 season following the firing of Jeff Scott.

== Playing career ==
Da Prato was born in Sacramento, California, and grew up in Modesto, California. His father, Steve Da Prato, is a football coach and athletic administrator. Daniel attended Fred C. Beyer High School, where he played quarterback. At the time, his father was the head football coach at Modesto Junior College. Steve moved to New Mexico Highlands University for the 2000 season and then Chabot College in Hayward, California, in 2001. Daniel followed him through these moves, playing quarterback at both schools before transferring to Louisiana–Monroe for the 2002 and 2003 seasons.

== Coaching career ==
Da Prato began his coaching career in 2004 as a graduate assistant at Louisiana–Monroe under head coach Charlie Weatherbie. He was named director of football operations in 2006. In 2007, he returned to Northern California as wide receivers coach at California State University, Sacramento under new head coach Marshall Sperbeck. Da Prato coached at Sacramento State for six seasons, adding the special teams coordinator title in 2010. Da Prato resigned from Sacramento State in March 2013 to become the special teams coordinator and tight ends coach at Montana State University in Bozeman, Montana, under head coach Rob Ash. Da Prato replaced Erik Link, who departed to become an analyst at Auburn University.

Montana State fired Ash after the 2015 season. Da Prato joined the University of Colorado Boulder staff under Mike MacIntyre in 2016 as offensive quality control coach. Colorado fired MacIntyre after the 2018 season, and Da Prato moved to the University of Arkansas as special teams quality control coach. That job ended after one season when Arkansas fired head coach Chad Morris during a disastrous 2019 season. Special teams coordinator/tight ends coach Barry Lunney Jr. became interim head coach, and Da Prato took over the special teams coordinator role for the remainder of the season.

Following the 2019 season, the University of South Florida hired Da Prato to be special teams coordinator under new head coach Jeff Scott. South Florida fired Scott on November 6, 2022, with three games remaining in the regular season, and named Da Prato the interim head coach.

== Head coaching record ==
Year	Team	Overall	Conference	Standing	Bowl/playoffs
South Florida Bulls (American Athletic Conference) (2022)
2022	South Florida	0–3 (Note: Da Prato replaced Jeff Scott with three games remaining)	0–3	11th	
South Florida:		0–3	0–3		
Total:		0–3			
