= South Florida Bulls football =

Football program of the University of South Florida (USF)

2026 South Florida Bulls football team
- First season: 1997; 29 years ago
- Athletic director: Rob Higgins (CEO of Athletics)
- Head coach: Brian Hartline; 1st season, 6–5 (.545)
- Location: Tampa, FL
- Stadium: Raymond James Stadium (capacity: 69,218)
- NCAA division: Division I FBS
- Conference: American
- Nickname: Bulls
- Colors: Green and gold
- All-time record: 190–169–0 (.529)
- Bowl record: 8–5 (.615)

Division championships
- AAC East: 2016
- Consensus All-Americans: 2
- Rivalries: UCF (rivalry)
- Fight song: Golden Brahman March
- Mascot: Rocky D. Bull
- Marching band: Herd of Thunder
- Outfitter: Adidas
- Website: gousfbulls.com/football

The South Florida Bulls football team represents the University of South Florida (USF). The Bulls began playing in 1997, and compete in the American Conference (The American) of the Football Bowl Subdivision (FBS) within the National Collegiate Athletic Association (NCAA). The team currently plays its home games at Raymond James Stadium in Tampa, Florida, however the Bulls will host home games at a new $340 million on-campus stadium starting in the 2027 season.

== History ==
=== Jim Leavitt era (1997–2010) ===
In 1997, Jim Leavitt, previously the co-defensive coordinator at Kansas State, was hired as the team's first head coach. Their first team meeting was held under a shade tree, as the school had no proper football facilities on campus. The team started as a Division I-AA (now Division I FCS) independent for their first four seasons, finishing with a winning record three times and ranked in the AP Poll twice. During the 2000 season, their final year in Division I-AA, the Bulls beat three teams ranked in the top 15: No. 13 James Madison, No. 6 Western Kentucky, and No. 1 Troy State; as well as Division I-A Connecticut. That team finished with a 7–4 record, with all four losses coming to Division I-A opponents, however they were ineligible for the Division I-AA playoffs as they were to transition to I-A the following year.

In 2001, the Bulls moved to Division I-A (now Division I FBS), where they remained independent. They joined Conference USA in 2003, but only stayed until 2005, when they became a member of the Big East Conference. On December 31, 2005, USF lost to NC State in the Meineke Car Care Bowl, the team's first bowl appearance. On December 23, 2006, USF won its first bowl game, the inaugural Papajohns.com Bowl, with a victory over former Conference USA rival East Carolina. Leavitt led the Bulls to 5 straight bowl games from 2005 to 2009, earning a 3–2 record.

South Florida upset Top 25-ranked teams such as Louisville (2005), West Virginia (2006, 2007, 2009), Auburn (2007), Kansas (2008) and Florida State (2009). During Leavitt's tenure, the Bulls were 7–12 against opponents ranked in the Top 25.

The 2007 football season marked the first ascent into both the AP Poll and BCS standings for the Bulls. They reached No. 23 after defeating No. 17 Auburn 26–23 in OT, No. 18 after defeating North Carolina 37–10, No. 6 after defeating No. 5 West Virginia 21–13, No. 5 after defeating FAU 35–23, and the team finally peaked at No. 2 in the country after defeating UCF 64–12. The Bulls' high ranking was short lived, as South Florida lost its next 3 games after injuries plagued the team. The Bulls would rebound and win three straight games to close out the regular season ranked No. 21 in the BCS standings and No. 23 in the AP Poll. After a 9–3 season, the Bulls earned a bid to their third straight bowl game, the Brut Sun Bowl against Oregon.

Leavitt was fired on January 8, 2010, after an investigation revealed that, during halftime of a game against Louisville, he grabbed a player by the shoulder pads and struck him twice across the face. The investigation also claimed that Leavitt interfered with the investigation by telling several coaches and players to change their stories. Leavitt maintains he never struck the player, but was merely trying to console him, and after a wrongful termination suit against USF, the school eventually settled with Leavitt for $2.75 million.

=== Skip Holtz era (2010–2012) ===
On January 14, 2010, Skip Holtz, son of legendary coach Lou Holtz, was hired as the team's second head coach, leaving East Carolina after five seasons.

During his first season, Holtz led the Bulls to the program's first victory over the Miami Hurricanes. Following the regular season, he led the Bulls to 31–26 victory over the Clemson Tigers in the Meineke Car Care Bowl. USF finished with an overall record of 8–5 record, the fifth consecutive season of at least eight wins.

To start the 2011 season, Skip Holtz led the Bulls to a dramatic 23–20 victory against Notre Dame, his alma mater. Unfortunately, the Bulls finished the season with an overall record of 5–7, the team's first losing season since 2004.

The team struggled again during the 2012 season, as the Bulls finished with a 3–9 record, which, at the time, was the worst in school history. USF athletics director Doug Woolard fired Holtz at the conclusion of the 2012 season, and Holtz was subsequently hired by Louisiana Tech to be the new head coach.

=== Willie Taggart era (2013–2016) ===
On December 8, 2012, USF announced the hire of Willie Taggart, who previously served as head football coach at Western Kentucky.

Despite having the top rated recruiting class in the American Conference heading into the 2013 season, the Bulls struggled in Taggart's first year, posting a 2–10 record, which, at the time, was the worst record in school history.

USF once again had the top recruiting class in the American Conference heading into the 2014 season, and the Bulls showed improvement in Taggart's second year, finishing with a 4–8 record.

In Taggart's third season, after having the second best recruiting class in the American Athletic Conference, the Bulls finished with an 8–5 record. After a 1–3 start, with losses to FSU, Maryland, and Memphis, USF won seven of their next eight games, including a 44–23 upset of No. 22 Temple, a 65–27 victory over Cincinnati, and a 44–3 victory over in-state rival UCF. The Bulls earned a bid to the Miami Beach Bowl against Taggart's former team and alma mater, Western Kentucky, a game USF lost by a score of 45–35. During the bowl game, multiple school records were set, including single season rushing yards (1,381), and 100-yard rushing games (9), by Marlon Mack, and single season receiving yards (822) by Rodney Adams. The same day as the team's bowl game, Taggart received a three-year contract extension.

Before the 2016 season, the Bulls were selected by many media outlets to win the East division of the American, and were projected to play the University of Houston in the American Athletic Conference Football Championship Game. The Bulls ended the 2016 season tied with Temple for 1st place in the East division, but because of a Week 8 loss to the Owls, USF did not play in the American Athletic Conference Championship Game. In a Week 5 game against Cincinnati, Marlon Mack passed Andre Hall to become the leading rusher in program history. Two weeks later, in a Week 7 game against UConn, Mack passed B.J. Daniels to become the program leader in rushing touchdowns. After that game, Coach Taggart was included on the watch list for the Paul "Bear" Bryant Coach of the Year Award, presented annually to the best coach in college football. During their Week 9 game against No. 22 Navy, the Bulls set a school record for rushing yards in a game, racking up 412 yards in a 52–45 victory. The Bulls broke that record two weeks later in their Week 11 game against Memphis, rushing for 416 yards in a 49–42 victory. Also in that game, the Bulls broke the school record for offensive touchdowns in a season (58). In a Week 12 game against SMU, Quinton Flowers passed Matt Grothe to become the school leader in single-season total offense. The Bulls secured their first 10-win season after a 48–31 victory over UCF in Week 13. During that game, Quinton Flowers set the school record for single season rushing yards (1,425), passing the mark Marlon Mack set in 2015. On November 30, 2016, Quniton Flowers was named the American Athletic Conference Offensive Player of the Year, which was the first such award in school history. On December 7, 2016, Willie Taggart was announced as Oregon's new head coach, a position that was vacant after the firing of Mark Helfrich on November 29, 2016. Led by interim coach T. J. Weist, the Bulls ended their season with a 46–39 OT victory over South Carolina in the Birmingham Bowl on December 29, 2016. On January 12, 2017, Quinton Flowers was named the 2017 College Football Performance Awards National Performer of the Year.

=== Charlie Strong era (2017–2019) ===
On December 11, 2016, USF announced that former Texas and Louisville head coach Charlie Strong would become the Bulls' new head coach, the fourth in school history. Strong was hired, in part, because of his strong professional and recruiting ties to the state of Florida, as he served as an assistant coach at the University of Florida for almost a decade.

Before the 2017 season, the American Athletic Conference Media Poll listed USF as the favorites to win the 2017 American Athletic Conference Championship Game and the unanimous pick to win the East division. On August 3, the Bulls were ranked No. 21 in the preseason Amway Coaches Poll. On August 19, Quinton Flowers was named to the Manning Award Watch List, making him the first Bull to be named to five preseason watch lists, as he had already been named to watch lists for the Maxwell, Walter Camp Player of the Year, Davey O'Brien National Quarterback Award, and Johnny Unitas Golden Arm awards. On August 21, the Bulls were ranked No. 19 in the preseason AP Poll, which matched the highest preseason ranking in school history (2008). In their Week 1 game against San Jose State, the Bulls set school records for both rushing attempts (74) and total plays (101) in a single game. On September 15, the Bulls earned their first victory over a Big Ten opponent, beating Illinois 47–23. During this game, the Bulls totaled 680 yards of offense, the second-most in program history, and the most against an FBS opponent. During the Bulls' Week 4 game against Temple, Quinton Flowers became the program leader in both rushing touchdowns, passing Marlon Mack, and total touchdowns, passing Marquel Blackwell. Also during this game, the Bulls allowed only 85 yards of total offense, which is a program record against an FBS opponent. With a win in this game, the Bulls extended their winning streak to nine games, a program record. With a 33–3 win over Cincinnati in Week 7, the Bulls extended their streak of 30-plus point games to 23, matching the AP Poll era record (since 1936) set by Oregon from 2011 to 2012. The Bulls also extended their winning streak to 11 games, the longest active streak in the country. USF also equaled the best start in program history (6–0), which was previously accomplished in 2007. On October 18, Coach Strong was named on the watch list for the Paul "Bear" Bryant Coach of the Year Award. With a 34–28 win over Tulane in Week 8, the Bulls extended their streak of 30-plus point games to 24, setting the AP Poll era record. This win also gave USF their best start in program history (7–0). On November 2, Quinton Flowers was named a finalist for the Johnny Unitas Golden Arm Award. During the Bulls' Week 13 game against rival UCF, Quinton Flowers passed Matt Grothe to become the program's all-time leader in total yards. He also set single-game records for both passing yards (503) and total yards (605). After losing to No. 13 UCF, the Bulls finished the regular season in 2nd place in the East division of the American, and they ended their season with a 38–34 victory over Texas Tech in the Birmingham Bowl, finishing with a record of 10–2.

The Bulls' 2018 recruiting class was ranked second in the American Athletic Conference, behind only Cincinnati. On July 24, the American Athletic Conference Media Poll ranked USF third, behind only Memphis and UCF. The Bulls were also ranked behind only UCF as favorites to win the East Division. On August 2, the Bulls received six votes in the preseason Amway Coaches Poll, which put them just outside the Top 25. During the Bulls' Week 6 game against UMass, RB Jordan Cronkrite rushed for 302 yards, which set both USF and American Athletic Conference records for rushing yards in a game. On October 16, Coach Strong was named to the Bobby Dodd Coach of the Year Award watchlist. After starting the season 7–0, which tied the record for the best start in school history, the Bulls would lose their next five games to end the regular season 7–5. Despite the poor finish to the regular season, the Bulls were selected to play in the Bad Boy Mowers Gasparilla Bowl against Marshall. The Bulls would lose the game 38–20, however, wide receiver Randall St. Felix set two records, one for most yards in a USF bowl game, and the other for most yards in the Bad Boy Mowers Gasparilla Bowl, with 165 receiving yards.

The Bulls struggled in Coach Strong's third year, finishing with a record of 4–8. On December 1, 2019, Strong was fired two days after a 34–7 loss to UCF.

=== Jeff Scott era (2020–2022) ===
On December 9, 2019, USF announced that Jeff Scott would be the program's fifth head coach. Scott was previously the co-offensive coordinator at Clemson, where he won the College Football Playoff national championship in 2016 and 2018, and made the final at the conclusion of the 2019 season.

During Scott's first season, the Bulls suffered their worst loss in program history, a 52–0 defeat in a Week 3 game against No. 7 Notre Dame in South Bend. The 2020 season saw three games canceled due to COVID-19, and the team finished with a record of 1–8.

The 2021 season saw the Bulls start 0–2, with losses to No. 25 NC State and No. 13 Florida, but they snapped their 10-game losing streak with a 38–17 win against Florida A&M. On October 23, the team won their first game against an FBS opponent in the Jeff Scott era after beating Temple 34–14. Before the final game of the season, Coach Scott fired defensive coordinator Glenn Spencer, and within a few weeks, he found Spencer's replacement in Miami's defensive analyst Bob Shoop. The team finished the 2021 season with a 2–10 record, but after the regular season, sophomore running back Brian Battie earned several First Team All-America selections, joining George Selvie as the only two Bulls to earn First Team selections from two of the five major All-America organizations. When 247Sports launched the Transfer Team Rankings in 2021, the Bulls opened at No. 1 with eight Division I transfers.

South Florida fired Scott and defensive coordinator Bob Shoop on November 6, 2022, following a 1–8 start to the season. Special teams coordinator Daniel Da Prato took over as interim head coach, and linebackers coach Ernie Sims became defensive coordinator.

=== Alex Golesh Era (2023–2025) ===
On December 4, 2022, USF announced that Alex Golesh would be the program's sixth head coach. Golesh previously served as the offensive coordinator/tight ends coordinator for the University of Tennessee, where he was named a finalist for the Broyles Award after the 2022 regular season.

The Bulls showed tremendous improvement in Golesh's first season, finishing with a 6–6 record in the regular season and becoming bowl eligible for the first time since 2018. During the Week 11 game against Temple, wide receiver Sean Atkins set the program record for receptions in a season, surpassing the previous record that was held by Rodney Adams. The very next week, in a game against UTSA, he set the program record for receiving yards in a season, surpassing the previous record that was held by Marquez Valdes-Scantling. The following week, in a game against Charlotte, quarterback Byrum Brown set the program record for passing yards in a season, surpassing the previous record that was shared by Quinton Flowers and Matt Grothe. In the process, he became the first quarterback in school history to pass for more than 3,000 yards in a season. Brown finished the season 7th in the FBS in total offense. The Bulls ended the season by winning the Boca Raton Bowl, defeating Syracuse 45–0, which is the largest shutout in college bowl history.

Going into the 2024 season, the Bulls had the top ranked recruiting class in the American Conference. The Bulls finished the 2024 regular season with a 6–6 record, and earned an invitation to the Hawaii Bowl to play San Jose State. During the Week 8 game against UAB, wide receiver Sean Atkins passed Andre Davis for the most receptions in program history. Later in the season, during the Week 14 game against Rice, Atkins would join Andre Davis as the only receivers in program history with over 2,000 receiving yards. In their Week 12 win against Charlotte, the Bulls set a program record with 425 rushing yards. In Week 13, the Bulls set a program record for total yards against an FBS opponent when they tallied 715 yards in a win against Tulsa. The Bulls ended the season by winning The Hawaii Bowl 41–39 in 5OT. This set for the record for the longest bowl game in history, however the record was broken just two days later when Toledo defeated Pittsburgh in the GameAbove Sports Bowl in 6OT. During the game, Sean Atkins set the school record for receiving yards, passing the record previously held by Andre Davis.

For the 2025 season, the Bulls had the second ranked recruiting class in the American Conference behind Memphis. The Bulls continued to improve under Golesh, and they finished the regular season with a 9–3 record. The Bulls started the season with wins over No. 25 Boise State and No. 13 Florida, the first back-to-back wins over ranked opponents in program history. On September 30th, Cole Best was named to the Jason Witten Collegiate Man of the Year Watchlist. On October 2nd, Byrum Brown was named to the Maxwell Award Watchlist. On October 15th, Alex Golesh was named to the Bear Bryant Coach of the Year Watchlist. On October 16th, Mac Harris was named to The Sporting News Mid Season All-America Team. On October 22nd, Alex Golesh was named to the Dodd Trophy Midseason Watchlist. On October 23rd, Byrum Brown was named to the Manning Award Watchlist. On October 30th, Byrum Brown was selected to the Davey O’Brien QB class. On November 12th, Byrum Brown was named a Davey O’Brien Award Semifinalist. On November 20th, Christian Helm was named the Freddie Solomon Community Spirit Award Winner. On November 25th, Joel Gordon was named a Broyles Award Nominee. During the Week 14 game against Rice, Byrum Brown became the 12th player in FBS history with 3,000 passing yards and 1,000 rushing yards in a season. On December 2nd, it was announced that a record 11 Bulls earned All-Conference honors, including All-Conference First Team honors for Mac Harris and De'Shawn Rucker.

On November 30th, after the conclusion of the 2025 regular season, Coach Golesh was named the head coach at Auburn.

=== Brian Hartline era (2026–Present) ===
On December 3, 2025, USF announced that Brian Hartline, previously the offensive coordinator/wide receivers coach at Ohio State, would become the program's seventh head coach.

== Conference affiliations ==
The Bulls have played as an independent, both in FCS and FBS, and as a member of three conferences.

- Independent (1997–2002)
- Conference USA (2003–2004)
- Big East Conference (2005–2012)
- American Conference (2013–present)

== Championships ==
=== Division championships ===
Year	Division	Coach	Opponent	CG result
2016†	The American – East	Willie Taggart	N/A lost tiebreaker to Temple	

† Co–championship, not claimed by USF

== Head coaches ==
There have been ten head coaches in program history (7 full-time, 3 interim).

Coach	Tenure	Seasons	Games	Record	Win percentage	Bowl record
Jim Leavitt	1997–2009	13	152	95–57	.625	3–2
Skip Holtz	2010–2012	3	37	16–21	.432	1–0
Willie Taggart	2013–2016	4	49	24–25	.490	0–1
T. J. Weist†	2016	1	1	1–0	1.000	1–0
Charlie Strong	2017–2019	3	37	21–16	.568	1–1
Jeff Scott	2020–2022	3	30	4–26	.133	0–0
Daniel Da Prato†	2022	1	3	0–3	.000	0–0
Alex Golesh	2023–2025	3	38	23–15	.605	2–0
Kevin Patrick†	2025	1	1	0–1	.000	0–1
Brian Hartline	2026	1	11	6–5	.545	0-0

† Interim head coach

== Bowl games ==
South Florida has participated in 13 bowl games, and they have a record of 8–5. The Bulls currently hold the record for the largest shutout victory in bowl history with a 45–0 win against Syracuse in the 2023 Boca Raton Bowl.

Season	Head coach	Bowl	Opponent	Result
2005	Jim Leavitt	Meineke Car Care Bowl	NC State	L 0–14
2006	Jim Leavitt	PapaJohns.com Bowl	East Carolina	W 24–7
2007	Jim Leavitt	Brut Sun Bowl	Oregon	L 21–56
2008	Jim Leavitt	magicJack St. Petersburg Bowl	Memphis	W 41–14
2009	Jim Leavitt	International Bowl	Northern Illinois	W 27–3
2010	Skip Holtz	Meineke Car Care Bowl	Clemson	W 31–26
2015	Willie Taggart	Miami Beach Bowl	Western Kentucky	L 35–45
2016	T. J. Weist†	Birmingham Bowl	South Carolina	W 46–39 ^{(OT)}
2017	Charlie Strong	Birmingham Bowl	Texas Tech	W 38–34
2018	Charlie Strong	Bad Boy Mowers Gasparilla Bowl	Marshall	L 20–38
2023	Alex Golesh	Boca Raton Bowl	Syracuse	W 45–0
2024	Alex Golesh	Hawai’i Bowl	San Jose State	W 41–39^{(5OT)}
2025	Kevin Patrick†	StaffDNA Cure Bowl	Old Dominion	L 10–24

† Interim head coach

== Stadium and facilities ==
The Bulls played their home games at Tampa Stadium, which was also home of the Tampa Bay Buccaneers, during their debut season in 1997, as well as the first two games of the 1998 season before moving to the newly completed Raymond James Stadium. The Bulls debuted at Raymond James Stadium on October 3, 1998, with a 45–6 win over The Citadel.

From 1998 to 2007, the upper sections were typically not used during USF games, but the lower sections allowed for a capacity of 43,589.

On September 28, 2007, the No. 18 ranked Bulls played the No. 5 ranked West Virginia Mountaineers in front of 67,012 fans, which remained the largest USF home game crowd until September 29, 2012, when the Bulls played the FSU Seminoles in front of 69,383 fans.

The Bulls have enjoyed a considerable winning edge at home. As of the end of the 2025 season, they have a 115–67 record in home games, and a 107–65 record at Raymond James Stadium, including one streak of 21 straight home victories (11/6/1999–10/10/2003).

As of the 2026 season, the Bulls are 26–4 in home openers, with their only losses coming in 2013 to McNeese State, 2019 to No. 17 Wisconsin, 2021 to No. 9 Florida, and 2022 to No. 25 BYU.

On May 19, 2016, USF Director of Athletics Mark Harlan presented the department's five-year strategic plan, which included information about a potential on-campus stadium. On August 8, 2021, USF released the results of a feasibility study regarding an on-campus stadium. On September 8, 2021, the USF Board of Trustees announced that they were moving forward with plans for an on-campus stadium. On March 8, 2022, the committee responsible for developing the on-campus stadium recommended Sycamore Fields as a potential site. USF officially broke ground on the new stadium on November 8, 2024. The stadium is set to be completed by the start of the 2027 season.

The team conducts practices on campus at the Frank Morsani Football Practice Complex, which opened in 2011. In September 2021, the university began construction on a luxury indoor practice facility, which was completed in November 2022.

== Rivalries ==
USF's biggest rival is the UCF Knights, from the University of Central Florida, who played against one another from 2005 to 2008, and 2013 to 2022. Since 2023, USF has played Florida Atlantic University as a protected rival in every season, having previously faced them in 2002, 2007, 2010, and 2013.

=== UCF ===
Known officially as the War on I-4, the intense rivalry with in-state opponent UCF began with a matchup in 2005, and was played annually from 2013 to 2022. The matchup had been the subject of much discussion and fan enthusiasm since the 1990s, but it was not until 2005 that games were scheduled. The two schools met in a four-year, home-and-away series through 2008. USF won all four games, which drew substantial crowds, but declined to schedule any further games. The series resumed as an annual conference game when UCF joined the American in 2013. The annual match came to an end after the 2022 season as UCF moved to the Big 12 in 2023. Both schools have shown interest in continuing the annual rivalry game, but no dates have been set as of yet. Both sides are currently at an impasse over scheduling of games, with USF wanting a home and home set and UCF wanting just a single home game, with UCF AD Terry Mohajir stating they would only do a home and home if USF joined a power conference.

== Media ==
USF Football game broadcasts can be heard in the Bay Area and Southwest Florida on flagship station WRBQ 104.7 FM. Additionally, Spanish-language radio broadcasts for football games can be heard on WYUU 106.9 FM. Broadcasts are available worldwide on the Bulls Unlimited digital radio station on TuneIn. Play-by-play man, and the "Voice of the Bulls", Jim Louk, is teamed with analyst and former Bull Sam Barrington. Joey Johnston, a senior writer for the Tampa Tribune and Tampa Bay Times, joins Louk and Barrington as a sideline reporter.

Under the current American Conference TV deal, all home and in-conference away USF football games air on one of the ESPN channels or are streamed on ESPN+. Some replays can be seen on Spectrum Sports in the Tampa Bay area.

== USF Athletic Hall of Fame members ==
- Anthony Henry – DB 1997–2000
- Marquel Blackwell – QB 1999–2002
- George Selvie – DE 2006–2009
- Quinton Flowers – QB 2014–2017
- Matt Grothe – QB 2004–2009
- Kawika Mitchell – LB 2001–2002

== Bulls in the NFL ==
As of 2025, USF has had 30 players selected in the NFL Draft, including two players selected in the first round.

First round draft picks

Name	Position	Year	Overall pick	Team
Mike Jenkins	CB	2008	25	Dallas Cowboys
Jason Pierre-Paul	DE	2010	15	New York Giants

=== Active NFL ===
Updated April 2026.

Player	NFL team
Demontrey Jacobs	Arizona Cardinals
Donovan Jennings	Green Bay Packers

== Future non-conference opponents ==
Announced schedules as of January 30, 2026.

2026	2027	2028	2029	2030	2031	2032
FIU	Louisville	UConn	NC State	at Louisville	at Notre Dame	at Alabama
Delaware State	at Boise State	at Miami (FL)	Notre Dame	Bowling Green	Western Kentucky	
at Bowling Green	Florida A&M	Bethune-Cookman	at FIU	UMass		
Kent State	at Northern Illinois	Southern Miss				

== See also ==
- American football in the United States
- College football
