= Jaylen Johnson (American football) =

American football player (born 2000)

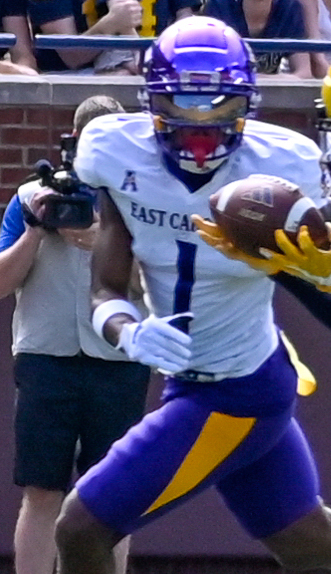
- Johnson with East Carolina in 2023

Profile
- Position: Wide receiver

Personal information
- Born: May 26, 2000 (age 26); Duluth, Georgia, U.S.
- Listed height: 6 ft 2 in (1.88 m)
- Listed weight: 194 lb (88 kg)

Career information
- High school: Peachtree Ridge (Suwanee, Georgia)
- College: Georgia (2018–2021); East Carolina (2022–2023)
- NFL draft: 2024: undrafted

Career history
- Los Angeles Chargers (2024–2025); Saskatchewan Roughriders (2026)
- Stats at Pro Football Reference

Jaylen Alexander Atoa Johnson (born May 26, 2000) is an American professional football wide receiver who is a free agent. He previously played in the National Football League for the Los Angeles Chargers and the Saskatchewan Roughriders in the Canadian Football League (CFL). Johnson played college football for the Georgia Bulldogs and East Carolina Pirates.

== Early life ==
Johnson was born on May 26, 2000, in Duluth, Georgia. He attended Peachtree Ridge High School where he played wide receiver and totaled 36 receptions for 490 yards and two touchdowns as a senior, being named first-team all-county and all-region. He walked-on to play college football for the Georgia Bulldogs.

== College career ==
Johnson redshirted as a freshman in 2018, being a member of the scout team, then appeared in three games as a reserve in 2019. He appeared in 10 games during the 2020 season, seeing action as a reserve wide receiver and special teams player. In the 2021 season, he appeared in 14 of 15 games for the national champion Bulldogs, recording three receptions for 29 yards and one carry for six yards. He entered the NCAA transfer portal following the season. He finished his stint at Georgia having appeared in 22 games.

Johnson transferred to the East Carolina Pirates in 2022, playing in 10 games that year while catching 26 receptions for 340 yards and four touchdowns, despite being limited by injury for most of the year. In his senior year, he caught 45 passes for 466 yards and two touchdowns while starting 11 of 12 games. He finished his stint at East Carolina with 71 receptions for 806 yards and six touchdowns.

== Professional career ==
Pre-draft measurables
Height	Weight	Arm length	Hand span	Wingspan	40-yard dash	10-yard split	20-yard split	20-yard shuttle	Three-cone drill	Vertical jump	Broad jump	Bench press
6 ft 0 7/8 in (1.85 m)	200 lb (91 kg)	30 3/4 in (0.78 m)	8 3/4 in (0.22 m)	6 ft 1 1/4 in (1.86 m)	4.55 s	1.61 s	2.65 s	4.50 s	7.50 s	33.0 in (0.84 m)	9 ft 9 in (2.97 m)	13 reps
All values from Pro Day

=== Los Angeles Chargers ===
After going unselected in the 2024 NFL draft, Johnson signed with the Los Angeles Chargers as an undrafted free agent. He had three receptions for 53 yards in preseason but was released at the final roster cuts on August 27, 2024, then being re-signed to the practice squad the following day. He was elevated to the active roster for the team's Week 8 game against the New Orleans Saints, and made his debut in the game, appearing on one offensive snap and three special teams snaps. He signed a reserve/future contract on January 13, 2025.

=== Saskatchewan Roughriders ===
On April 30, 2026, Johnson signed with the Saskatchewan Roughriders of the Canadian Football League. He appeared in three games for the club in the 2026 CFL season before his release on August 5, 2026.
