= Tank Dell =

American football player (born 1999)

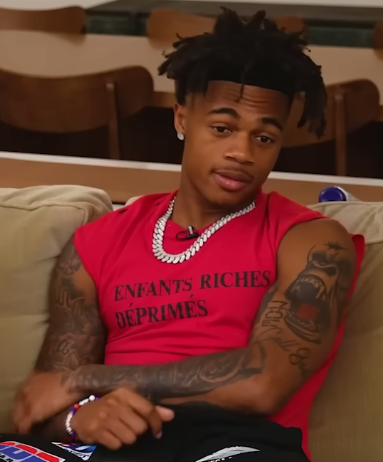
- Dell in 2024

No. 1 – Houston Texans
- Position: Wide receiver
- Roster status: Active

Personal information
- Born: October 29, 1999 (age 27); Daytona Beach, Florida, U.S.
- Listed height: 5 ft 10 in (1.78 m)
- Listed weight: 165 lb (75 kg)

Career information
- High school: Mainland (Daytona Beach)
- College: Alabama A&M (2018); Independence CC (2019); Houston (2020–2022)
- NFL draft: 2023: 3rd round, 69th overall pick

Career history
- Houston Texans (2023–present)

Awards and highlights
- NCAA receiving yards leader (2022); NCAA receiving touchdowns leader (2022); 2× First-team All-AAC (2021, 2022)

Career NFL statistics as of Week 10, 2026
- Receptions: 109
- Receiving yards: 1,572
- Receiving touchdowns: 11
- Stats at Pro Football Reference

Nathaniel Jasper "Tank" Dell Jr. (born October 29, 1999) is an American professional football wide receiver for the Houston Texans of the National Football League (NFL). He played college football for the Alabama A&M Bulldogs, Independence Community College, and Houston Cougars.

== College career ==
Dell attended Mainland High School in Daytona Beach, Florida. He had originally committed to Florida International University (FIU) to play college football but attended Alabama A&M University instead. After one year at Alabama A&M in which he had 12 receptions for 364 yards and three touchdowns, he transferred to Independence Community College. In his lone year at Independence, he had 52 receptions for 766 yards and eight touchdowns.

Dell transferred to the University of Houston in 2020. In his first year at Houston, he led the team with 29 receptions for 428 yards and three touchdowns over eight games. In 2021, he again led the team with 90 receptions for 1,329 yards with 12 touchdowns. He returned to Houston as the number one receiver in 2022, during which he made 100 receptions for 1,398 receiving yards and 17 receiving touchdowns in only 13 games played. He led the NCAA in receiving yards and receiving touchdowns while ranking second in receptions.

=== College statistics ===
Legend
	Led the NCAA
**Bold**	Career high

Season	Team	GP	Receiving			
Season	Team	GP	Rec	Yds	Avg	TD
2018	Alabama A&M	4	12	364	**30.3**	3
2019	Independence CC	10	52	766	14.7	8
2020	Houston	8	29	428	14.8	3
2021	Houston	14	90	1,329	14.8	12
2022	Houston	13	**109**	**1,398**	12.8	**17**
Career		49	292	4,285	14.7	43

== Professional career ==
Pre-draft measurables
Height	Weight	Arm length	Hand span	Wingspan	40-yard dash	10-yard split	20-yard split	Broad jump
5 ft 8 3/8 in (1.74 m)	165 lb (75 kg)	30 1/2 in (0.77 m)	8 5/8 in (0.22 m)	6 ft 0 5/8 in (1.84 m)	4.49 s	1.49 s	2.57 s	10 ft 1 in (3.07 m)
All values from NFL Combine

Dell was selected by the Houston Texans in the third round, 69th overall, of the 2023 NFL draft. In Week 11 against the Arizona Cardinals, Dell caught eight passes for a career-high 149 yards, and one touchdown. In Week 13 against the Denver Broncos, Dell suffered a fractured fibula and was ruled out for the rest of the season. He underwent surgery to repair the fibula the next day. He finished the season with 47 catches for 709 yards and seven touchdowns, which was among the rookie leaders at the time of the injury.

In Week 9 of the 2024 season, against the New York Jets, Dell had six receptions for 126 yards in the 21–13 loss. During the Texans’ Week 16 matchup against the Kansas City Chiefs, Dell collided with teammate Jared Wayne on a touchdown pass from C. J. Stroud and suffered a season-ending knee injury that included a dislocated knee, multiple torn ligaments, and meniscus damage. Prior to the injury, Dell had 51 catches for 667 yards and three touchdowns.

Dell missed the entire 2025 season due to the knee injury.

Dell began the 2026 season on injured reserve while still recovering from his knee injury. On October 6, 2026, the Texans opened the 21-day practice window for Dell to return from injured reserve, with Dell returning to practice the next day. He was activated for Week 7 on October 24. His first catch on his return was a 43-yarder, logging his first reception in 673 days. During Week 9 on November 8 against the Los Angeles Chargers at SoFi Stadium, Dell caught a 66-yard touchdown pass from C.J. Stroud, Dell’s first touchdown in 687 days.

== NFL career statistics ==
Legend
**Bold**	Career high

=== Regular season ===
Year	Team	Games		Receiving					Rushing					Fumbles	
Year	Team	GP	GS	Rec	Yds	Avg	Lng	TD	Att	Yds	Avg	Lng	TD	Fum	Lost
2023	HOU	11	8	47	709	15.1	68	7	11	51	4.6	13	0	1	0
2024	HOU	14	10	51	667	13.1	50	3	9	43	4.8	18	0	0	0
2025	HOU	0	0	Did not play due to injury											
2026	HOU	4	1	11	196	17.8	63	1	2	2	1.0	2	0	1	0
Career		29	19	109	1,572	14.4	68	11	22	96	4.4	18	0	2	0

== Personal life ==
On April 27, 2024, Dell sustained minor injuries from a shooting in Sanford, Florida. He was released from the hospital the next day.

On October 28, 2026, mayor John Whitmire proclaimed October 29, Dell’s birthday, to be Nathaniel “Tank” Dell Day in Houston.
