= Brian Battie =

American football player (born 2001)

No. 21 – Auburn Tigers
- Positions: Running back, Return specialist
- Class: Senior

Personal information
- Born: September 27, 2001 (age 25); Sarasota, Florida, U.S.
- Listed height: 5 ft 7 in (1.70 m)
- Listed weight: 168 lb (76 kg)

Career information
- High school: Sarasota (Sarasota, Florida)
- College: South Florida (2020–2022); Auburn (2023–present)

Awards and highlights
- First-team All-American (2021); Second-team All-AAC (2022)
- Stats at ESPN

Brian Battie (born September 27, 2001) is a former American college football running back and return specialist for the Auburn Tigers. He has previously played for the South Florida Bulls.

== Early life ==
Battie grew up in Sarasota, Florida and initially attended Braden River High School. He transferred to Sarasota High School after his freshman year and rushed for 1,227 yards and 19 touchdowns on 136 attempts as a sophomore. Battie transferred back to Braden River before his junior year and gained 2,133 yards on 246 carries with 28 rushing touchdowns. He transferred again and returned to Sarasota High School for his senior year and rushed for 1,182 yards and scored 15 touchdowns. Battie committed to play college football at South Florida over offers from Kansas State, Cincinnati, UConn, Akron, Buffalo, Middle Tennessee State, Northern Illinois, Coastal Carolina and Georgia Southern.

== College career ==
Battie rushed for 332 yards and one touchdown on 46 carries as a freshman. He rushed for 102 yards on 15 carries with one touchdown in the final game of the season against rival UCF in a 58–46 loss. Battie rushed 324 yards and one touchdown during his sophomore season. He was named a first team All-American as a return specialist by the Football Writers Association of America and the Walter Camp Foundation and was a second team selection by the Sporting News after returning 20 kickoffs for 650 yards and three touchdowns, all of which were on 100-yard returns.

On January 9, 2023, Battie announced that he was transferring to Auburn.

On January 1, 2024, Battie announced that he would be entering the transfer portal for the second time. However, on January 9, he would withdraw his name from the transfer portal.

== Personal life ==
On May 18, 2024, Battie was involved in a shootout in his hometown of Sarasota. His older brother, Tommie Battie IV, was fatally shot in the altercation. Battie was transported to the hospital in critical condition with multiple injuries.
