= Taylor McHargue =

American football player and broadcaster (born 1991)

No. 16
- Position: Quarterback

Personal information
- Born: March 22, 1991 (age 35); Austin, Texas, U.S.
- Listed height: 6 ft 2 in (1.88 m)
- Listed weight: 220 lb (100 kg)

Career information
- High school: Vista Ridge (Cedar Park, Texas)
- College: Rice (2009–2013)
- Stats at ESPN

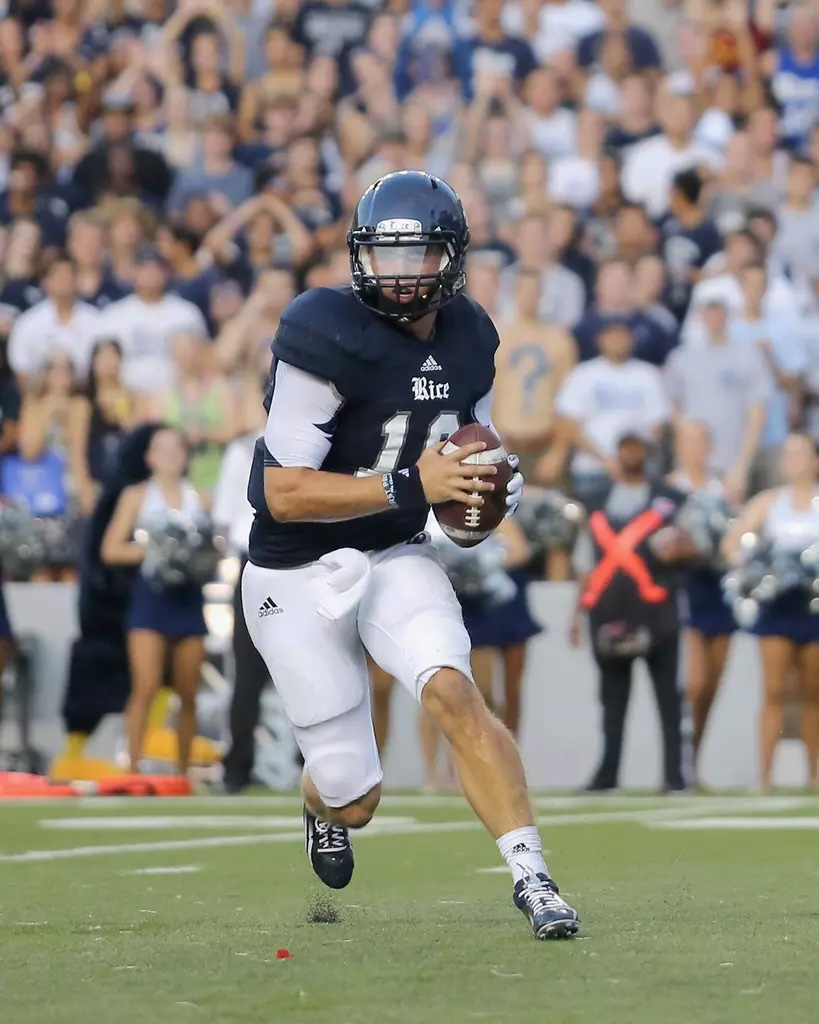
Former Rice University quarterback Taylor McHargue (#16) during a game against UCLA on August 30, 2012.

Joseph Taylor McHargue (born March 22, 1991) is an American sports broadcaster and former college football quarterback. Since 2023, he has served as a color analyst for college football broadcasts on CBS Sports. McHargue played quarterback at Rice University from 2009 to 2013, where he became the program’s all-time leader in wins and finished second in both total yards and total touchdowns.

== Early life ==
McHargue was born in Austin, Texas, and raised in Cedar Park. He attended Vista Ridge High School, where he passed for 2,040 yards and 17 touchdowns and rushed for 1,606 yards and 16 touchdowns as a senior. He earned second-team All-District 16-5A honors and was team captain. McHargue also competed in track and field and helped lead the school's 4×200 meter relay team to a district title.

== College career ==
As a four-year starter, McHargue led the Owls to multiple bowl games and their first outright conference championship since 1953. He accumulated 7,533 total offense yards during his career from 2010 to 2013, making him second all-time in school history in total offense. That total includes 5,449 passing yards and 1,489 rushing yards, along with 43 passing touchdowns and 19 rushing scores.

In 2012, McHargue threw just five interceptions in 325 pass attempts, with none in his final 81 throws of the season. He was known for his efficiency, dual-threat mobility, and leadership.

He became the first Rice quarterback to start four consecutive season openers since freshmen became eligible in 1972.

== Broadcasting career ==
In 2023, McHargue joined CBS Sports as a college football color analyst. He has provided in-game commentary for nationally broadcast games across multiple conferences, including the Pac-12, Mountain West, Mid-American Conference (MAC), and Conference USA. In 2025, McHargue began co-hosting TNT Sports’ Inside the 12, a weekly preview of Big 12 college football games.

== Personal life ==
McHargue and his wife, Sarah, live in Austin, Texas. They have two sons.
