= 2022 Military Bowl =

Postseason college football bowl game

2022 Military Bowl presented by Peraton
- 13th Military Bowl
UCF Knights	Duke Blue Devils
(9–4)	(8–4)
The American	ACC
13	30
Head coach: Gus Malzahn	Head coach: Mike Elko
	1	2	3	4	Total
UCF	7	0	0	6	13
Duke	7	13	3	7	30
- Date: December 28, 2022
- Season: 2022
- Stadium: Navy–Marine Corps Memorial Stadium
- Location: Annapolis, Maryland
- MVP: Riley Leonard (QB, Duke)
- Favorite: Duke by 3
- Referee: Rodney Burnette (C–USA)
- Attendance: 17,974
- Payout: US$2,066,990

United States TV coverage
- Network: ESPN
- Announcers: Kevin Brown (play-by-play), Hutson Mason (analyst), and Marilyn Payne (sideline)

International TV coverage
- Network: ESPN Deportes

The 2022 Military Bowl was a college football bowl game played on December 28, 2022, at Navy–Marine Corps Memorial Stadium in Annapolis, Maryland. The 13th annual Military Bowl featured UCF from the American Athletic Conference and Duke from the Atlantic Coast Conference. The game began at 2:00 p.m. EST and was aired on ESPN. It was one of the 2022–23 bowl games concluding the 2022 FBS football season. Sponsored by technology company Peraton, the game was officially known as the Military Bowl presented by Peraton.

== Teams ==
This was the first time that Duke and UCF have ever played each other.

=== UCF ===
The Knights, from the American Athletic Conference, finished the regular season with a record of 9–3 (6–2 in conference play). The team tied with Cincinnati for second in the conference, with their victory over the Bearcats securing the tiebreaker to advance to the AAC Championship Game, in which they lost to Tulane, 45–28. The Knights are led by second-year head coach Gus Malzahn. This is the 14th bowl game for the Knights.

This will be UCF's final game as a member of the AAC, as the Knights are set to join the Big 12 Conference in 2023.

=== Duke ===
The Blue Devils, from the Atlantic Coast Conference, finished the regular season with a record of 8–4 (5–3 in conference play). They are led by first-year head coach Mike Elko. This is the 15th bowl game for the Blue Devils.

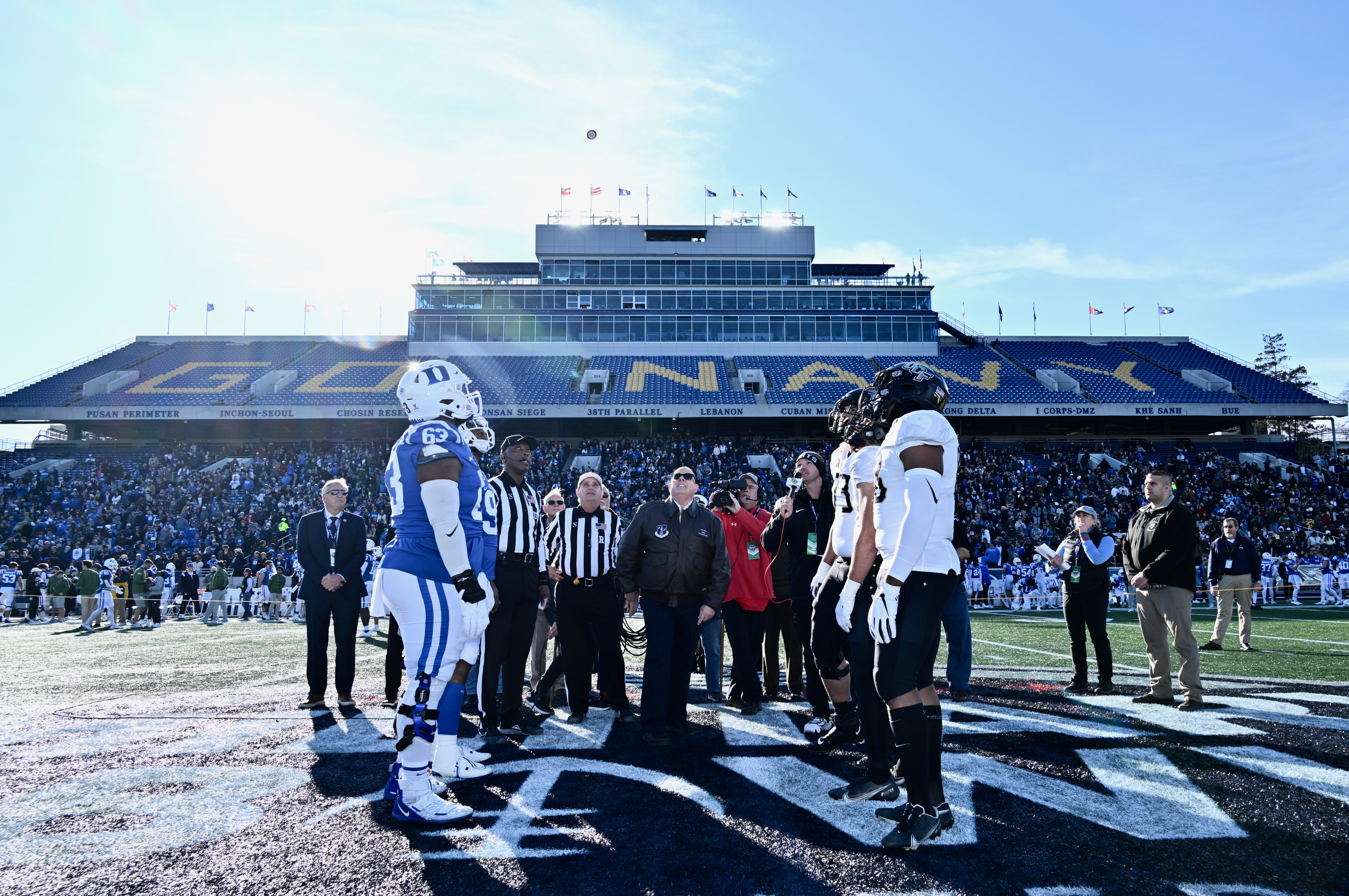
Coin toss, by Governor of Maryland Larry Hogan, before the game

== Game summary ==
2022 Military Bowl presented by Peraton

Quarter	1	2	3	4	Total
UCF	7	0	0	6	13
Duke	7	13	3	7	30

at Navy–Marine Corps Memorial Stadium • Annapolis, Maryland

- Date: Wednesday, December 28, 2022
- Game time: 2:00 p.m. EST
- Game weather: Sunny • Temperature: 43 °F (6 °C) • Wind: 12 mph (19 km/h) southeast
- Game attendance: 17,974
- Referee: Rodney Burnette
- TV announcers (ESPN): Kevin Brown (play-by-play), Hutson Mason (analyst), and Marilyn Payne (sideline)
- Box score

Scoring summary

Quarter	Time	Drive			Team	Scoring information	Score	
Quarter	Time	Plays	Yards	TOP	Team	Scoring information	UCF	Duke
1	7:47	9	87	4:46	Duke	Jaquez Moore 14-yard touchdown run, Todd Pelino kick good	0	7
1	2:10	14	75	5:37	UCF	Isaiah Bowser 1-yard touchdown run, Colton Boomer kick good	7	7
2	6:28	11	66	5:11	Duke	22-yard field goal by Todd Pelino	7	10
2	1:54	7	58	3:49	Duke	Riley Leonard 1-yard touchdown run, Todd Pelino kick good	7	17
2	0:00	9	38	1:14	Duke	48-yard field goal by Todd Pelino	7	20
3	8:02	13	54	6:58	Duke	38-yard field goal by Todd Pelino	7	23
4	9:03	11	91	5:07	UCF	Isaiah Bowser 2-yard touchdown run, 2-point pass no good	13	23
4	2:29	7	26	2:56	Duke	Riley Leonard 3-yard touchdown run, Todd Pelino kick good	13	30
"TOP" = time of possession. For other American football terms, see Glossary of American football.								

== Statistics ==
Team statistical comparison
Statistic	UCF	Duke
First downs	21	22
First downs rushing	10	10
First downs passing	11	10
First downs penalty	0	2
Third down efficiency	5–14	7–14
Fourth down efficiency	2–4	0–0
Total plays–net yards	71–326	69–350
Rushing attempts–net yards	36–128	40–177
Yards per rush	3.6	4.4
Yards passing	198	173
Pass completions–attempts	22–35	19–29
Interceptions thrown	1	0
Punt returns–total yards	0–0	0–0
Kickoff returns–total yards	3–41	1–22
Punts–average yardage	4–47.2	4–42.8
Fumbles–lost	3–1	0–0
Penalties–yards	3–27	1–5
Time of possession	25:32	34:28

UCF statistics
Knights passing
	C–A	Yds	TD–INT
John Rhys Plumlee	21–34	182	0–1
RJ Harvey	1–1	16	0–0
Knights rushing
	Car	Yds	TD
Isaiah Bowser	11	39	2
Johnny Richardson	3	30	0
RJ Harvey	6	29	0
John Rhys Plumlee	14	21	0
Xavier Townsend	2	9	0
Knights receiving
	Rec	Yds	TD
Kobe Hudson	5	63	0
Javon Baker	2	49	0
RJ Harvey	3	25	0
Xavier Townsend	7	25	0
Alec Holler	2	18	0
John Rhys Plumlee	1	16	0
Johnny Richardson	2	2	0

Duke statistics
Blue Devils passing
	C–A	Yds	TD–INT
Riley Leonard	19–28	173	0–0
Team	0–1	0	0–0
Blue Devils rushing
	Car	Yds	TD
Riley Leonard	10	63	2
Jaylen Coleman	7	53	0
Jaquez Moore	12	43	1
Terry Moore	6	16	0
Jordan Waters	3	5	0
Team	2	-3	0
Blue Devils receiving
	Rec	Yds	TD
Jalon Calhoun	6	62	0
Jaquez Moore	1	32	0
Sahmir Hagans	4	32	0
Jordan Moore	3	13	0
Cole Finney	1	12	0
Eli Pancol	2	12	0
Terry Moore	1	8	0
Jaylen Coleman	1	2	0
