= 2022 Louisville Cardinals football team =

American college football season

2022 Louisville Cardinals football

Fenway Bowl champion

Fenway Bowl, W 24–7 vs. Cincinnati
- Conference: Atlantic Coast Conference
- Atlantic Division
- Record: 8–5 (4–4 ACC)
- Head coach: Scott Satterfield (4th season; regular season); Deion Branch (interim; bowl game)
- Offensive coordinator: Lance Taylor (1st season)
- Offensive scheme: Spread option
- Defensive coordinator: Bryan Brown (4th season)
- Co-defensive coordinator: Wesley McGriff (1st season)
- Base defense: 4–2–5
- Home stadium: Cardinal Stadium

Uniform
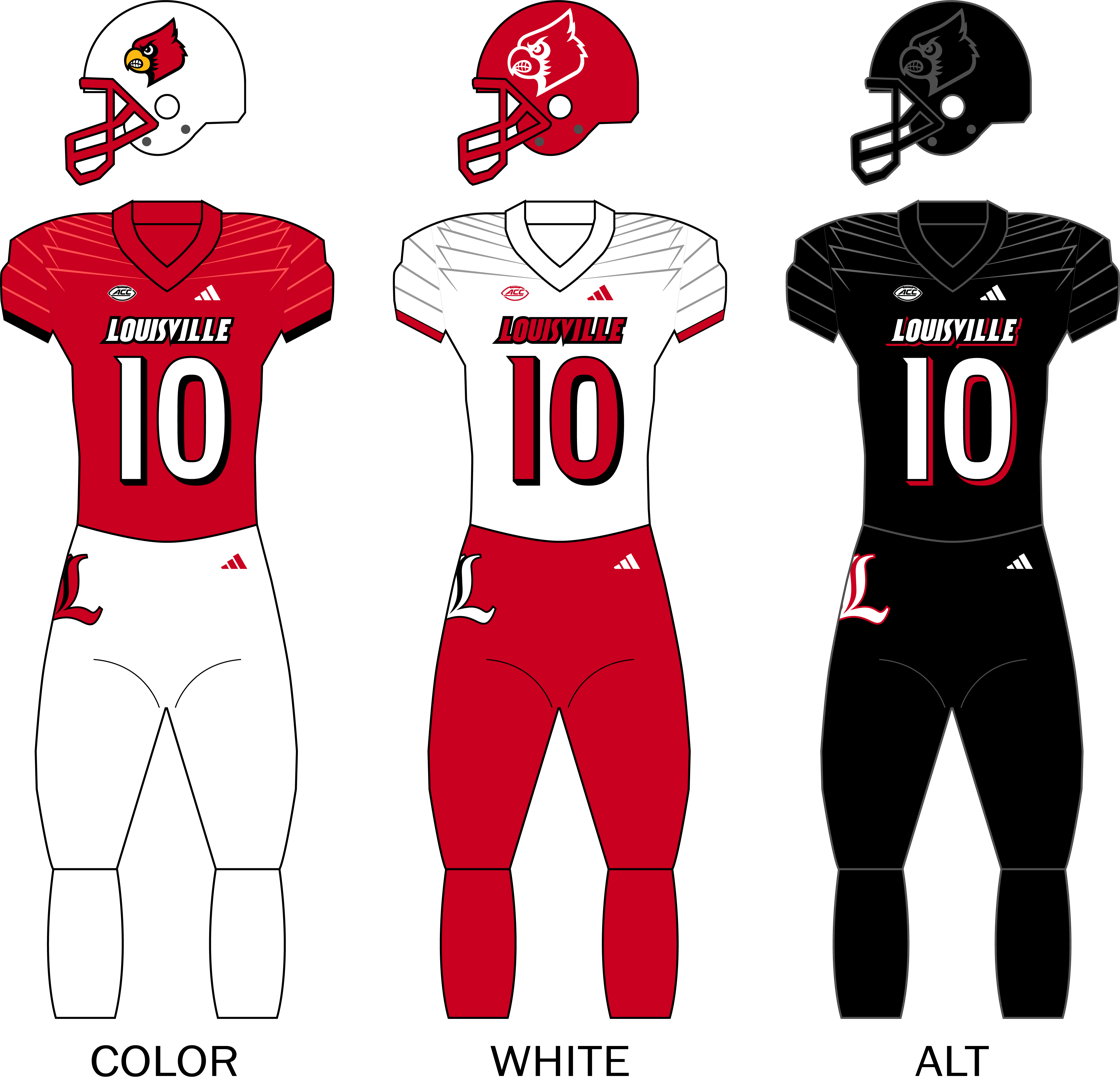

2022 Atlantic Coast Conference football standings
	Conf.			Overall
Team	W		L	W		L
Atlantic Division
No. 13 Clemson xy$	8	–	0	11	–	3
No. 11 Florida State	5	–	3	10	–	3
Louisville	4	–	4	8	–	5
NC State	4	–	4	8	–	5
Syracuse	4	–	4	7	–	6
Wake Forest	3	–	5	8	–	5
Boston College	2	–	6	3	–	9
Coastal Division
North Carolina xy	6	–	2	9	–	5
Duke	5	–	3	9	–	4
No. 22 Pittsburgh	5	–	3	9	–	4
Georgia Tech	4	–	4	5	–	7
Miami (FL)	3	–	5	5	–	7
Virginia	1	–	6	3	–	7
Virginia Tech	1	–	6	3	–	8
Championship: Clemson 39, North Carolina 10
$ – Conference champion; x – Division champion/co-champions; y – Championship game participant; Rankings from AP Poll

The 2022 Louisville Cardinals football team represented the University of Louisville during the 2022 NCAA Division I FBS football season. This was the team's fourth season under head coach Scott Satterfield. The Cardinals played their home games at Cardinal Stadium in Louisville, Kentucky, and competed as a member of the Atlantic Coast Conference (ACC).

On December 5, Satterfield announced he would be leaving Louisville to become the head coach at Cincinnati. Director of player personal, Deion Branch, who played wide receiver for Louisville in 2000 and 2001, was named interim head coach for the Cardinals' bowl game.

== Schedule ==
Date	Time	Opponent	Rank	Site	TV	Result	Attendance
September 3	8:00 p.m.	at Syracuse		JMA Wireless Dome; Syracuse, NY	ACCN	L 7–31	37,110
September 9	7:30 p.m.	at UCF*		FBC Mortgage Stadium; Orlando, FL	ESPN2	W 20–14	44,412
September 16	7:30 p.m.	Florida State		Cardinal Stadium; Louisville, KY	ESPN	L 31–35	46,459
September 24	12:00 p.m.	South Florida*		Cardinal Stadium; Louisville, KY	ACCRSN	W 41–3	41,217
October 1	12:00 p.m.	at Boston College		Alumni Stadium; Chestnut Hill, MA	ACCN	L 33–34	38,517
October 8	12:00 p.m	at Virginia		Scott Stadium; Charlottesville, VA	ACCN	W 34–17	38,009
October 22	8:00 p.m.	Pittsburgh^{†}		Cardinal Stadium; Louisville, KY	ACCN	W 24–10	41,840
October 29	3:30 p.m.	No. 10 Wake Forest		Cardinal Stadium; Louisville, KY	ACCN	W 48–21	39,503
November 5	7:30 p.m.	James Madison*		Cardinal Stadium; Louisville, KY	ESPNU	W 34–10	42,157
November 12	3:30 p.m.	at No. 10 Clemson		Memorial Stadium; Clemson, SC	ESPN	L 16–31	80,176
November 19	3:30 p.m.	No. 24 NC State		Cardinal Stadium; Louisville, KY	ACCRSN	W 25–10	38,974
November 26	3:00 p.m.	at Kentucky*	No. 25	Kroger Field; Lexington, KY (Governor's Cup)	SECN	L 13–26	58,727
December 17	11:30 a.m.	vs. Cincinnati*		Fenway Park; Boston, MA (The Keg of Nails, Fenway Bowl)	ESPN	W 24–7	15,000
*Non-conference game; ^{†}Homecoming; Rankings from AP Poll (and CFP Rankings, after November 1) - Released prior to game; All times are in Eastern time

== Rankings ==
Ranking movements Legend: ██ Increase in ranking ██ Decrease in ranking — = Not ranked RV = Received votes
	Week															
Poll	Pre	1	2	3	4	5	6	7	8	9	10	11	12	13	14	Final
AP	—	—	—	—	—	—	—	—	—	RV	RV	—	RV	—	—	RV
Coaches	RV	—	—	—	—	—	—	—	—	RV	RV	—	RV	—	—	RV
CFP	Not released									—	—	—	25	—	—	Not released

== Game summaries ==
=== At Syracuse ===
	1	2	3	4	Total
Cardinals	7	0	0	0	7
Orange	10	7	0	14	31

Statistics	LOU	SYR
First downs	15	23
Total yards	334	449
Rushing yards	137	208
Passing yards	197	241
Turnovers	3	0
Time of possession	27:29	32:31

Team	Category	Player	Statistics
Louisville	Passing	Malik Cunningham	16/22, 152 yards, 2 INT
Louisville	Rushing	Tiyon Evans	13 rushes, 89 yards, TD
Louisville	Receiving	Tyler Hudson	8 receptions, 102 yards
Syracuse	Passing	Garrett Shrader	18/25, 236 yards, 2 TD
Syracuse	Rushing	Sean Tucker	21 rushes, 100 yards, TD
Syracuse	Receiving	Sean Tucker	6 receptions, 84 yards, TD

=== At UCF ===
	1	2	3	4	Total
Knights	7	7	0	0	14
Cardinals	7	0	10	3	20

Statistics	LOU	UCF
First downs	19	18
Total yards	427	339
Rushing yards	226	208
Passing yards	201	131
Turnovers	1	1
Time of possession	32:14	27:46

Team	Category	Player	Statistics
Louisville	Passing	Malik Cunningham	14/29, 201 yards
Louisville	Rushing	Malik Cunningham	17 rushes, 121 yards, TD
Louisville	Receiving	Tyler Hudson	3 receptions, 67 yards
UCF	Passing	John Rhys Plumlee	16/34, 131 yards, INT
UCF	Rushing	John Rhys Plumlee	17 rushes, 83 yards
UCF	Receiving	Javon Baker	5 receptions, 84 yards

=== Florida State ===
	1	2	3	4	Total
Seminoles	14	0	7	14	35
Cardinals	14	7	0	10	31

Statistics	FSU	LOU
First downs	21	25
Total yards	455	495
Rushing yards	189	252
Passing yards	266	243
Turnovers	2	3
Time of possession	30:48	29:12

Team	Category	Player	Statistics
Florida State	Passing	Jordan Travis	13/17, 157 yards, 2 TD, INT
Florida State	Rushing	Treshaun Ward	10 rushes, 126 yards
Florida State	Receiving	Johnny Wilson	7 receptions, 149 yards, 2 TD
Louisville	Passing	Malik Cunningham	21/34, 243 yards, TD, INT
Louisville	Rushing	Malik Cunningham	17 rushes, 127 yards, 2 TD
Louisville	Receiving	Ahmari Huggins Bruce	3 receptions, 61 yards

=== South Florida ===
	1	2	3	4	Total
Bulls	0	0	0	3	3
Cardinals	14	14	3	10	41

Statistics	USF	LOU
First downs		
Total yards		
Rushing yards		
Passing yards		
Turnovers		
Time of possession		

Team	Category	Player	Statistics
South Florida	Passing		
South Florida	Rushing		
South Florida	Receiving		
Louisville	Passing		
Louisville	Rushing		
Louisville	Receiving		

=== At Boston College ===
	1	2	3	4	Total
Cardinals	7	16	10	0	33
Eagles	7	14	7	6	34

Statistics	LOU	BC
First downs		
Total yards		
Rushing yards		
Passing yards		
Turnovers		
Time of possession		

Team	Category	Player	Statistics
Louisville	Passing		
Louisville	Rushing		
Louisville	Receiving		
Boston College	Passing		
Boston College	Rushing		
Boston College	Receiving		

=== At Virginia ===
	1	2	3	4	Total
Cardinals	0	13	14	7	34
Cavaliers	10	0	7	0	17

Statistics	LOU	UVA
First downs		
Total yards		
Rushing yards		
Passing yards		
Turnovers		
Time of possession		

Team	Category	Player	Statistics
Louisville	Passing		
Louisville	Rushing		
Louisville	Receiving		
Virginia	Passing		
Virginia	Rushing		
Virginia	Receiving		

=== Pittsburgh ===
	1	2	3	4	Total
Panthers	7	0	3	0	10
Cardinals	0	7	0	17	24

Statistics	PITT	LOU
First downs		
Total yards		
Rushing yards		
Passing yards		
Turnovers		
Time of possession		

Team	Category	Player	Statistics
Pittsburgh	Passing		
Pittsburgh	Rushing		
Pittsburgh	Receiving		
Louisville	Passing		
Louisville	Rushing		
Louisville	Receiving		

=== No. 10 Wake Forest ===
	1	2	3	4	Total
No. 10 Demon Deacons	0	14	0	7	21
Cardinals	6	7	35	0	48

Statistics	WAKE	LOU
First downs		
Total yards		
Rushing yards		
Passing yards		
Turnovers		
Time of possession		

Team	Category	Player	Statistics
Wake Forest	Passing		
Wake Forest	Rushing		
Wake Forest	Receiving		
Louisville	Passing		
Louisville	Rushing		
Louisville	Receiving		

=== James Madison ===
	1	2	3	4	Total
Dukes	3	7	0	0	10
Cardinals	7	3	10	14	34

Statistics	JMU	LOU
First downs		
Total yards		
Rushing yards		
Passing yards		
Turnovers		
Time of possession		

Team	Category	Player	Statistics
James Madison	Passing		
James Madison	Rushing		
James Madison	Receiving		
Louisville	Passing		
Louisville	Rushing		
Louisville	Receiving		

=== At No. 10 Clemson ===
	1	2	3	4	Total
Cardinals	0	7	3	6	16
No. 10 Tigers	10	7	7	7	31

Statistics	LOU	CLEM
First downs	15	26
Total yards	400	439
Rushing yards	150	248
Passing yards	250	191
Turnovers	2	3
Time of possession	28:09	31:51

Team	Category	Player	Statistics
Louisville	Passing	Brock Domann	13/23, 175 yards, TD, INT
Louisville	Rushing	Jawhar Jordan	11 carries, 73 yards
Louisville	Receiving	Tyler Hudson	11 receptions, 163 yards
Clemson	Passing	DJ Uiagalelei	19/27, 185 yards, TD
Clemson	Rushing	Phil Mafah	10 carries, 106 yards, TD
Clemson	Receiving	Antonio Williams	10 receptions, 83 yards, TD

=== No. 24 NC State ===
	1	2	3	4	Total
No. 24 Wolfpack	0	3	7	0	10
Cardinals	0	13	0	12	25

Statistics	NCST	LOU
First downs	20	16
Total yards	291	345
Rushing yards	77	192
Passing yards	214	153
Turnovers	1	0
Time of possession	30:34	29:26

Team	Category	Player	Statistics
NC State	Passing	Ben Finley	16/35, 201 yards, TD, INT
NC State	Rushing	Jordan Houston	8 carries, 41 yards
NC State	Receiving	Darryl Jones	4 receptions, 60 yards
Louisville	Passing	Brock Domann	12/25, 153 yards
Louisville	Rushing	Jawhar Jordan	16 carries, 105 yards, TD
Louisville	Receiving	Tyler Hudson	6 receptions, 85 yards

=== At Kentucky ===
	1	2	3	4	Total
No. 25 Cardinals	0	7	0	6	13
Wildcats	7	6	10	3	26

Statistics	LOU	UK
First downs	19	17
Total yards	309	346
Rushing yards	164	158
Passing yards	145	188
Turnovers	3	0
Time of possession	27:15	32:45

Team	Category	Player	Statistics
Louisville	Passing	Brock Domann	14/21, 129 yards, TD, INT
Louisville	Rushing	Jawhar Jordan	22 carries, 145 yards
Louisville	Receiving	Tyler Hudson	6 receptions, 83 yards, TD
Kentucky	Passing	Will Levis	11/19, 188 yards, 2 TD
Kentucky	Rushing	Chris Rodriguez Jr.	24 carries, 120 yards
Kentucky	Receiving	Josh Kattus	2 receptions, 76 yards

=== Vs. Cincinnati (Fenway Bowl) ===
	1	2	3	4	Total
Cardinals	7	14	3	0	24
Bearcats	0	7	0	0	7

Statistics	LOU	CIN
First downs	24	10
Total yards	419	127
Rushing yards	287	44
Passing yards	132	83
Turnovers	4	2
Time of possession	32:29	27:31

Team	Category	Player	Statistics
Louisville	Passing	Brock Domann	13/21, 132 yards, TD, INT
Louisville	Rushing	Maurice Turner	31 carries, 160 yards
Louisville	Receiving	Jaelin Carter	4 receptions, 50 yards
Cincinnati	Passing	Evan Prater	7/15, 83 yards, TD
Cincinnati	Rushing	Ethan Wright	8 carries, 43 yards
Cincinnati	Receiving	Blue Smith	2 receptions, 32 yards
