= Jalon Calhoun =

American gridiron football player (born 2000)

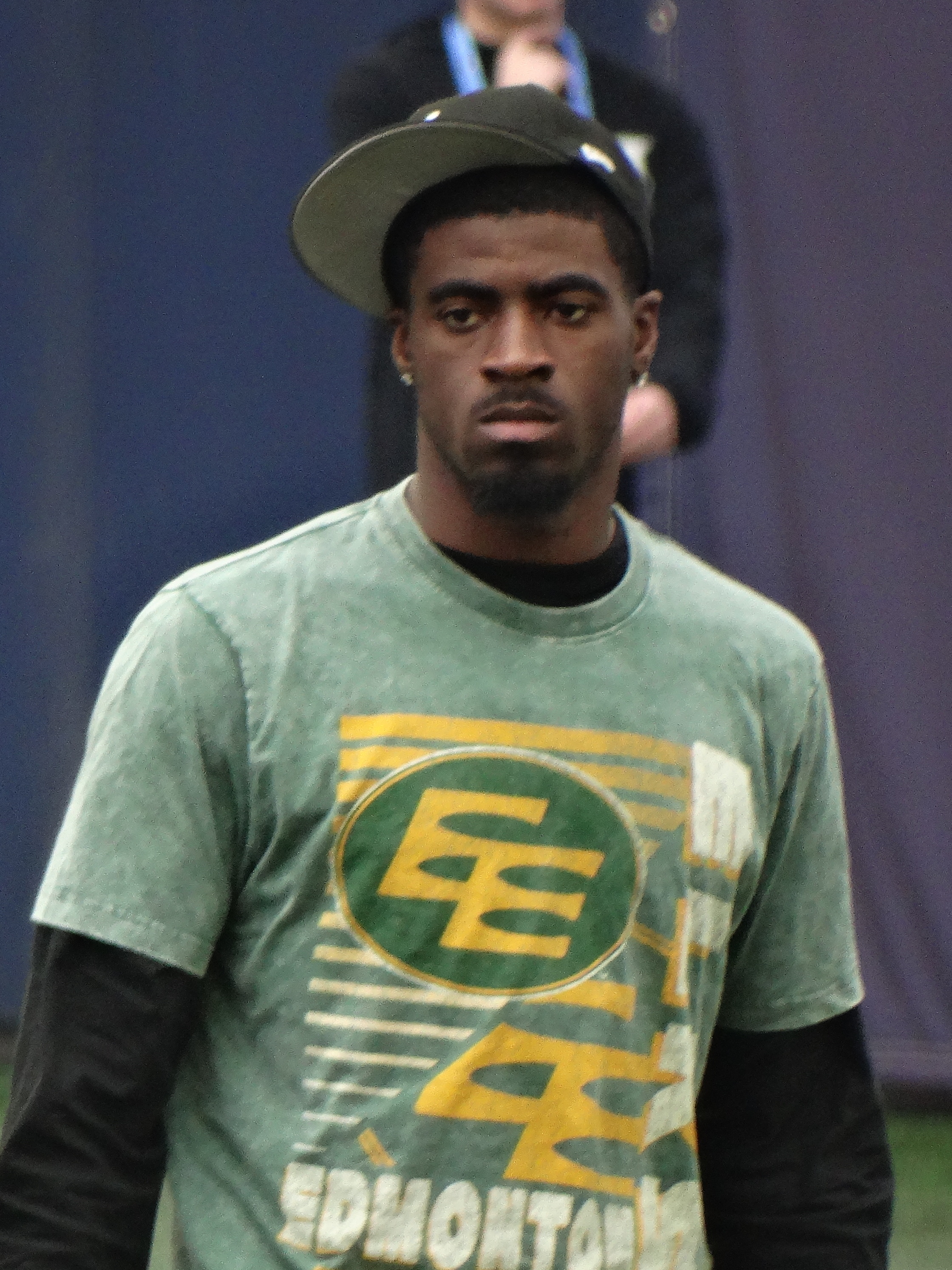
- Calhoun with the Edmonton Elks in 2025

No. 85 – Edmonton Elks
- Position: Wide receiver
- Roster status: Practice roster
- CFL status: American

Personal information
- Born: December 16, 2000 (age 25); Greenville, South Carolina, U.S.
- Listed height: 5 ft 11 in (1.80 m)
- Listed weight: 191 lb (87 kg)

Career information
- High school: Southside (Greenville)
- College: Duke (2019–2023)
- NFL draft: 2024: undrafted

Career history
- Detroit Lions (2024)*; Edmonton Elks (2025–present)
- * Offseason or practice squad member only

Awards and highlights
- Grey Cup champion (2026); Third-team All-ACC (2022)
- Stats at CFL.ca

Jalon Calhoun (born December 16, 2000) is an American professional football wide receiver for the Edmonton Elks of the Canadian Football League (CFL). He played college football for the Duke Blue Devils.

== Early life ==
Calhoun grew up in Greenville, South Carolina and attended Southside High School. In Calhoun's high school career, he played as a quarterback completing 218 of his 368 passing attempts for 2,859 yards and 25 touchdowns to 10 interceptions. He also rushed for 1,094 yards and 14 touchdowns. Calhoun first committed to play college football at Georgia Tech but eventually changed his commitment to Duke.

== College career ==
Calhoun made his collegiate debut in week one in the 2019 season, where he hauled in his first career pass for two yards, as Duke was crushed by Alabama 42–3. In week two, Calhoun had a career day, catching eight passes for 105 yards and two touchdowns, as he helped the Blue Devils beat North Carolina A&T 45–13. Calhoun had another good performance in week three bringing in six passes for 49 yards and a touchdown, as he helped Duke beat Middle Tennessee State 41–18. In week seven, Calhoun had another good performance racking up four receptions for 68 yards, as he helped Duke beat Georgia Tech 41–23. In the team's season finale, Calhoun had an excellent performance, bringing in three receptions for 82 yards as he helped the Blue Devils finish their season with a win against Miami. Calhoun finished the 2019 season with 46 receptions for 420 yards and four touchdowns.

Calhoun started the 2020 season strong, as in week one he caught five passes for 62 yards, but Duke would fall to Notre Dame 27–13. In week five, Calhoun again had another good performance, making three catches for 38 yards and a touchdown, as he helped the Blue Devils pick up their first win on the season, beating Syracuse 38–24. In week eight, Calhoun continued to perform, having another good performance, racking up four receptions for 36 yards and a touchdown, as he helped Duke beat Charlotte 53–19. Calhoun finished the 2020 season with 39 receptions for 349 yards and two touchdowns.

Calhoun had a hot start to the 2021 season, as in week two, he hauled in five receptions for 98 yards, as he helped the Blue Devils pick up their first win on the season beating North Carolina A&T 45–17. In week four, Calhoun brought in a big touchdown to help Duke beat Kansas 52–33. In week five, Calhoun had a career performance, making six catches for 103 yards and a touchdown, but Duke was defeated by North Carolina 38–7. In the following game, Calhoun had another great performance racking up five receptions for 103 yards, while also adding seven rushing yards, but once again Duke lost, this time to Georgia Tech 31–27. In week ten, Calhoun racked up three receptions for 78 yards and a touchdown, but once again Duke was routed 54–29 against Pittsburgh. Calhoun finished the 2021 season with 56 receptions for 718 yards and three touchdowns, while also rushing for 13 yards and a touchdown.

Calhoun started the 2022 season off to a hot start, as in week one he racked up six receptions for 90 yards, as he helped the Blue Devils win their season opener versus Temple. Calhoun had another great performance in week two, racking up six receptions for 108 yards, as he helped Duke pick up another win, this time over Northwestern. In week four, Calhoun continued with his stellar performances, making five catches for 93 yards and a touchdown, but the Blue Devils would lose against Kansas 35–27. Just a week later, Calhoun had another great performance hauling in six receptions for 65 yards and a touchdown, as he helped Duke beat Virginia in a convincing fashion 38–17. In week eleven, Calhoun had another dominating performance, bringing in five receptions for 94 yards, as he would help the Blue Devils beat Virginia Tech soundly 24–7. Just a week later, Calhoun had another good performance, racking up four catches for 52 yards and a touchdown, in a 28–26 loss against Pittsburgh. In the team's season finale, Calhoun had arguably the best game of his career, bringing in 11 receptions for 174 yards and a touchdown, as Duke beat Wake Forest 34–31. In the team's bowl game, Calhoun had a solid performance racking up six receptions for 62 yards, as he helped the Blue Devils beat UCF 30–13 and win their bowl game. Calhoun finished his 2022 breakout season with 62 receptions for 873 yards and four touchdowns. For his performance on the year he was named third team All-ACC.

Calhoun was named to the 2023 preseason first team All-ACC football team.

== Professional career ==
=== Detroit Lions ===
Calhoun signed with the Detroit Lions as an undrafted free agent on May 10, 2024. He was waived on August 27.

=== Edmonton Elks ===
Calhoun signed with the Edmonton Elks of the Canadian Football League on December 18, 2024.

On May 31, 2026, Calhoun was released by the Elks as part of final roster cuts. On September 22, he was re-signed to the practice roster.
