= 2022 UCF Knights football team =

American college football season

2022 UCF Knights football

AAC Championship Game, L 28–45 vs. Tulane

Military Bowl, L 13–30 vs. Duke
- Conference: American Athletic Conference
- Record: 9–5 (6–2 AAC)
- Head coach: Gus Malzahn (2nd season)
- Offensive coordinator: Chip Lindsey (1st season)
- Offensive scheme: Spread option
- Defensive coordinator: Travis Williams (2nd season)
- Co-defensive coordinator: David Gibbs (2nd season)
- Base defense: 4–2–5
- Home stadium: FBC Mortgage Stadium

2022 American Athletic Conference football standings
	Conf.			Overall
Team	W		L	W		L
No. 9 Tulane y$	7	–	1	12	–	2
UCF y	6	–	2	9	–	5
Cincinnati	6	–	2	9	–	4
SMU	5	–	3	7	–	6
Houston	5	–	3	8	–	5
East Carolina	4	–	4	8	–	5
Navy	4	–	4	4	–	8
Memphis	3	–	5	7	–	6
Tulsa	3	–	5	5	–	7
Temple	1	–	7	3	–	9
South Florida	0	–	8	1	–	11
Championship: Tulane 45, UCF 28
$ – Conference champion; y – Championship game participant; Rankings from AP Poll

The 2022 UCF Knights football team represented the University of Central Florida (UCF) during the 2022 NCAA Division I FBS football season. The Knights were led by second-year head coach Gus Malzahn and played their home games at the newly named FBC Mortgage Stadium in Orlando, Florida. They competed as members of the American Athletic Conference.

In September 2021, UCF and fellow AAC members Cincinnati and Houston accepted bids to join the Big 12. The schools were contractually required to remain with the AAC until 2024, however, indications were that all parties involved preferred to leave in 2023. In June 2022 they reached a deal to depart the conference in 2023, thus the 2022 season became the program's last season as a member of the AAC. UCF finished their tenure in AAC (2013–2022) with a record 59 intra-conference game victories, including two wins in the AAC Championship Game.

The Knights finished the regular season with a record of 9–3 (6–2 in AAC) to finish second in the conference. Following their victory on October 29 against then-No. 20 Cincinnati, the Knights became bowl-eligible for the seventh consecutive season, and were ranked for the first time since 2020. Two weeks later, they defeated then-No. 17 Tulane. After a last-second victory against rival South Florida, UCF secured a berth in the AAC Championship Game, a rematch at Tulane. The Knights lost to the Green Wave 45–28, and failed to win what would have been their fifth AAC championship in what was also their final conference game in the AAC. The Knights were invited to the Military Bowl to face Duke, their seventh straight bowl appearance, and 12th in the last 14 seasons.

== Schedule ==
The Knights were scheduled to play seven home games (South Carolina State, Louisville, Georgia Tech, SMU, Temple, Cincinnati, Navy) and five away games (FAU, ECU, Memphis, Tulane, South Florida) in 2022. The official schedule was released February 17. The rivalry game, played Thanksgiving weekend, at South Florida was played on Saturday November 26, the first time since 2016 that the rivalry game was held on Saturday instead of Black Friday. The Knights advanced to the AAC Championship Game, which was scheduled for and held Saturday December 3.

Date	Time	Opponent	Rank	Site	TV	Result	Attendance
September 1	7:00 p.m.	South Carolina State*		FBC Mortgage Stadium; Orlando, FL	ESPN+	W 56–10	43,810
September 9	7:30 p.m.	Louisville*		FBC Mortgage Stadium; Orlando, FL	ESPN2	L 14–20	44,412
September 17	7:30 p.m.	at Florida Atlantic*		FAU Stadium; Boca Raton, FL	CBSSN	W 40–14	30,991
September 24	4:00 p.m.	Georgia Tech*		FBC Mortgage Stadium; Orlando, FL	ESPNU	W 27–10	44,220
October 5 (Note: Due to Hurricane Ian's impact on Orlando and the surrounding areas, the game against SMU was moved from Saturday October 1 to Wednesday October 5.)	7:00 p.m.	SMU		FBC Mortgage Stadium; Orlando, FL	ESPN2	W 41–19	27,495
October 13	7:00 p.m.	Temple		FBC Mortgage Stadium; Orlando, FL (Space Game)	ESPN	W 70–13	41,729
October 22	7:30 p.m.	at East Carolina		Dowdy–Ficklen Stadium; Greenville, NC	ESPNU	L 13–34	38,245
October 29	3:30 p.m.	No. 20 Cincinnati^{†}		FBC Mortgage Stadium; Orlando, FL (rivalry)	ESPN	W 25–21	44,313
November 5	3:30 p.m.	at Memphis	No. 25	Simmons Bank Liberty Stadium; Memphis, TN	ESPN2	W 35–28	28,048
November 12	3:30 p.m.	at No. 17 Tulane	No. 22	Yulman Stadium; New Orleans, LA	ESPN2	W 38–31	27,317
November 19	11:00 a.m.	Navy	No. 20	FBC Mortgage Stadium; Orlando, FL	ESPN2	L 14–17	44,813
November 26 (Note: The game at South Florida was tentatively scheduled for either Friday November 25 or Saturday November 26. On October 3, the date was officially announced as November 26.)	7:00 p.m.	at South Florida	No. 22	Raymond James Stadium; Tampa, FL (War On I–4)	ESPN2	W 46–39	32,217
December 3	4:00 p.m.	at No. 18 Tulane	No. 22	Yulman Stadium; New Orleans, LA (AAC Championship Game)	ABC	L 28–45	30,118
December 28	2:00 p.m.	vs. Duke*		Navy–Marine Corps Memorial Stadium; Annapolis, MD (Military Bowl)	ESPN	L 13–30	17,974
*Non-conference game; ^{†}Homecoming; Rankings from AP Poll (and CFP Rankings, after November 1) – Released prior to game; All times are in Eastern time

== Rankings ==
Ranking movements Legend: ██ Increase in ranking ██ Decrease in ranking — = Not ranked RV = Received votes
	Week															
Poll	Pre	1	2	3	4	5	6	7	8	9	10	11	12	13	14	Final
AP	RV	RV	—	—	—	—	—	RV	—	25	22	17	25	22	RV	—
Coaches	RV	RV	—	—	—	RV	RV	RV	RV	25	21	18	RV	23	RV	RV
CFP	Not released									25	22	20	22	22	—	Not released

== Preseason ==
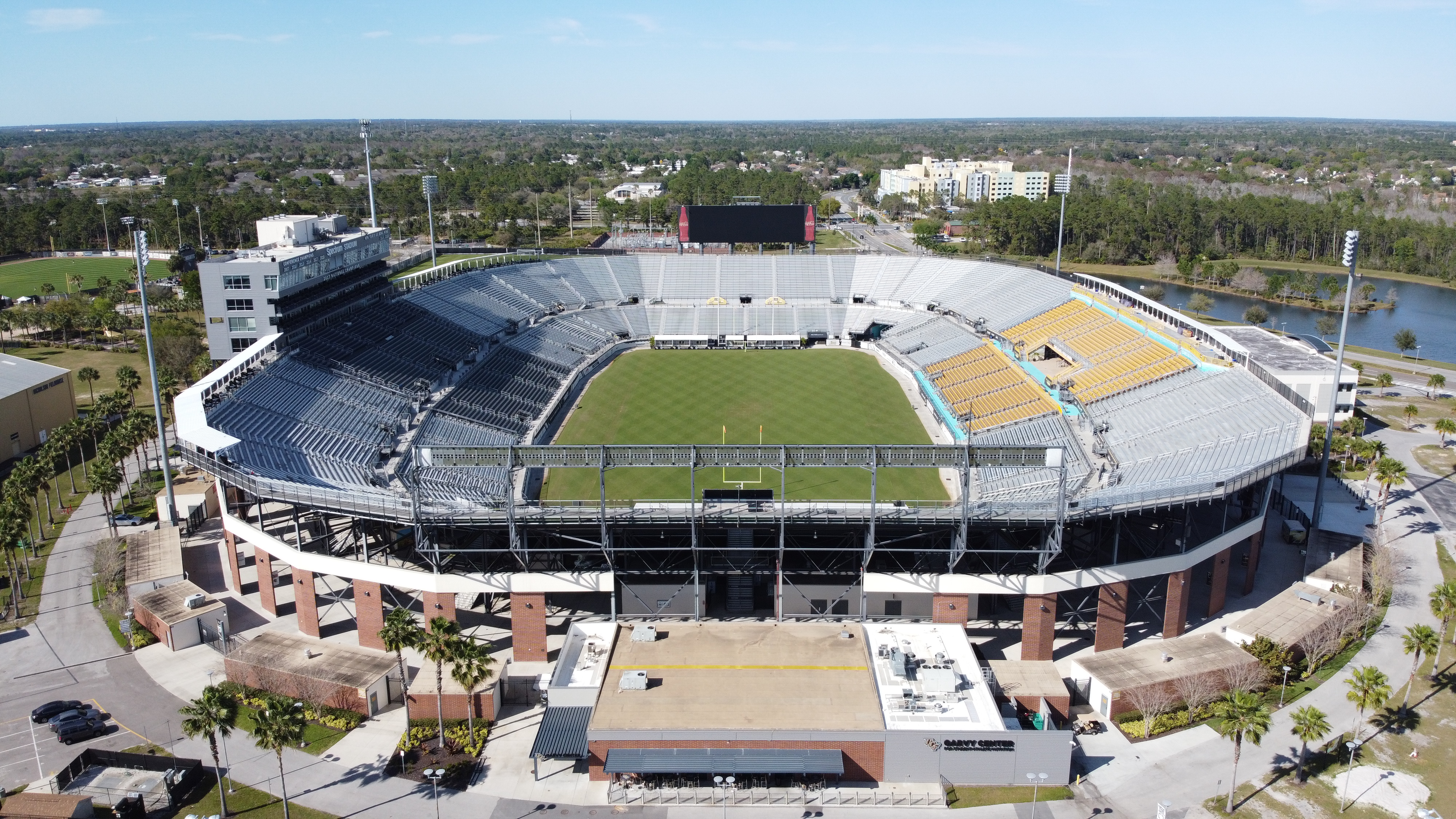
FBC Mortgage Stadium.

On May 31, 2022, FBC Mortgage entered a ten-year, $19.5 million deal with UCF for the naming rights of UCF's football stadium beginning July 1, 2022. UCF's home stadium, which opened in 2007, was previously known as the Bounce House, Spectrum Stadium, and Bright House Networks Stadium.

Dillon Gabriel, who started at quarterback for the Knights in 2019–2020, and led UCF to a win in the 2019 Gasparilla Bowl, suffered a season-ending broken clavicle at Louisville in the third week of 2021. Gabriel would not play another down for the Knights, and by season's end, elected to enter the NCAA transfer portal, eventually opting to play at Oklahoma.

Ole Miss quarterback John Rhys Plumlee announced his transfer to UCF on January 9, 2022. Plumlee and returning starter Mikey Keene were expected to compete for the quarterback position.

Players that entered the NCAA transfer portal, and UCF's 2022 recruits are as follows:

=== Spring game ===
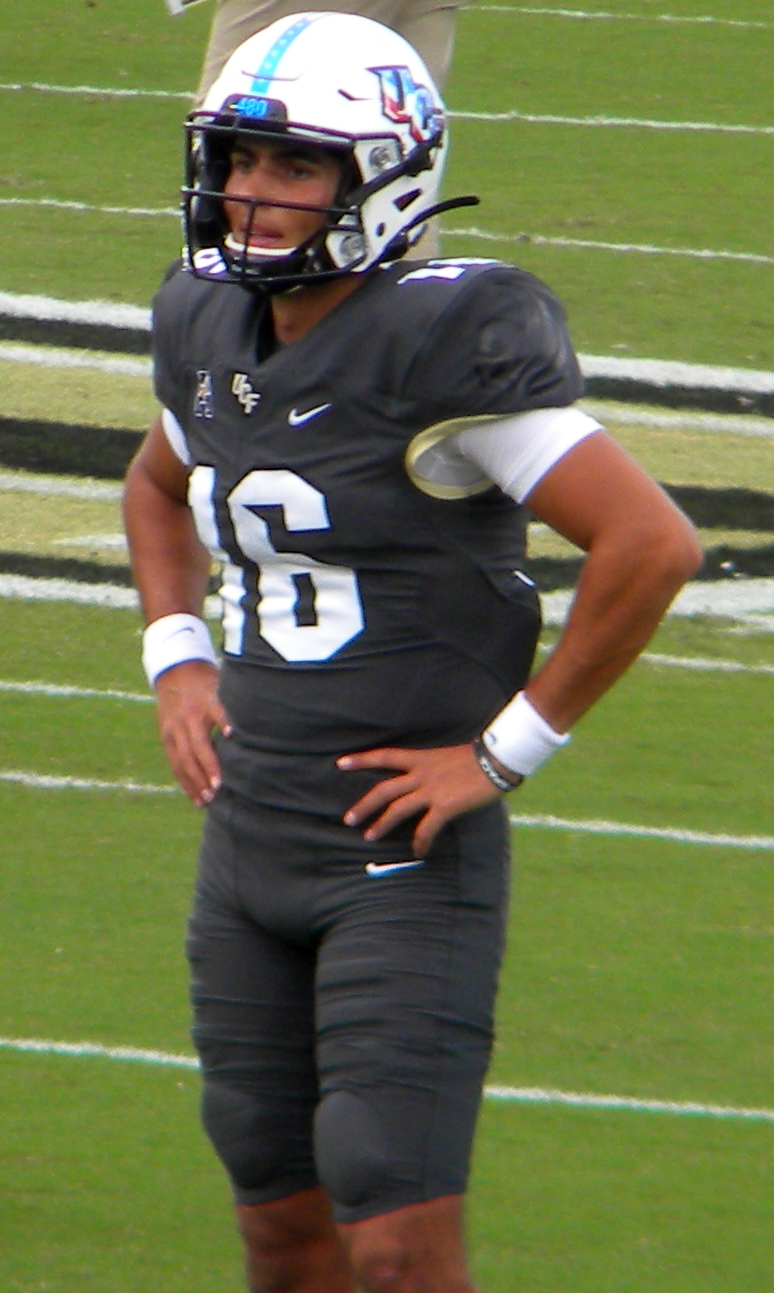
Quarterback Mikey Keene

The 2022 UCF Spring exhibition game was held Saturday April 16 at the Bounce House. The team was split into two squads for gameplay, the Black squad and the Gold squad. Sophomore quarterback Mikey Keene threw three touchdown passes, and transfer quarterback John Rhys Plumlee threw four. The two combined for 471 passing yards, with wide receiver Jaylon Robinson making three catches for 126 yards and two touchdowns. Johnny Richardson led the rushing with 108 yards on nine carries. On the defensive side, Jaiden Francois highlighted with an 80-yard interception return. The Gold squad defeated the Black squad 38–14.

Date	Time	Spring Game	Site	Result
April 16	12:00 pm	Gold vs. Black	Bounce House • Orlando, FL	38–14

=== Award watch lists ===
A total of 19 players were named to the preseason All-AAC mention, and six players were named to the Senior Bowl watchlist.

Award	Player	Position	Year
Doak Walker Award	Isaiah Bowser	RB	Sr.
Doak Walker Award	Johnny Richardson	RB	Jr.
Fred Biletnikoff Award	Ryan O'Keefe	WR	Sr.
Rimington Trophy	Matt Lee	C	(redshirt) Jr.
John Mackey Award	Kemore Gamble	TE	(redshirt) Sr.
Jim Thorpe Award	Davonte Brown	CB	Jr.
Bronko Nagurski Trophy	Divaad Wilson	S	(redshirt) Sr.
Wuerffel Trophy	Isaiah Bowser	RB	(redshirt) Sr.
Outland Trophy	Lokahi Pauole	OG	Sr.
Ray Guy Award	Andrew Osteen	P	Sr.
Paul Hornung Award	Ryan O'Keefe	WR	Sr.
Patrick Mannelly Award	Alex Ward	LS	(redshirt) Sr.
Earl Campbell Tyler Rose Award	Ryan O'Keefe	WR	Sr.
Polynesian Football Player of the Year Award	Lokahi Pauole	OG	Sr.
Paul "Bear" Bryant Award	Gus Malzahn	HC	—
Broyles Award	Travis Williams	DC	—
Listed in the order that they were released

=== AAC preseason media poll ===
The American Athletic Conference preseason media poll was released at AAC Media Day on July 28, 2022. Houston (the conference runner-up in 2021) edged defending conference champion Cincinnati by one vote, while UCF ranked third, garnering 7 first-place votes.

=== Training camp ===
Fall training camp began on August 1. Team scrimmages were held August 7 and August 13. Isaiah Bowser, Josh Celiscar, Sam Jackson, Jeremiah Jean-Baptiste, and receiver Ryan O'Keefe were voted team captains. Amari Johnson (foot) and Dallaz Corbitt (hand) suffered unspecified injuries.

On August 21, 2022, head coach Gus Malzahn named John Rhys Plumlee the starting quarterback for week 1.

== Game summaries ==
=== South Carolina State ===
	1	2	3	4	Total
Bulldogs	0	3	7	0	10
Knights	21	7	14	14	56

Quarterback John Rhys Plumlee made his first start for the Knights, leading them to a 56–10 victory over South Carolina State (FCS) on opening night. Plumlee threw for 308 yards and four touchdown passes, and rushed for 86 yards and another touchdown. The Knights jumped out to a 28–0 lead, and won their season opener for the seventh straight year. Light rain and lighting in the area threatened to delay the game, but the kickoff was only pushed back by about five minutes.

The Knights took the opening kickoff and drove 70 yards in 9 plays. Plumee's 28-yard scramble set up a 12-yard touchdown pass to Javon Baker, giving UCF an early 7–0 lead. The Bulldogs converted a fake punt on 4th & 2, keeping their opening drive alive. Facing a 4th & 19 at their own 30, the Bulldogs appeared to be setting up another fake punt, but Tyler Smith kicked the ball after he was well beyond the line of scrimmage. The resulting penalty turned the ball over on downs. In one play, Plumlee found Kenmore Gamble for a diving 30-yard touchdown catch in the right side of the endzone. On the next drive, Corey Fields' pass was tipped and intercepted by Divaad Wilson, setting up UCF's third scoring drive. Plumlee connected with Ryan O'Keefe for a 45-yard gain, then faced a 4th & 5 at the Bulldogs 31 yard line, which they converted. On 1st & 10 at the 17 yard line, Plumlee rolled out to his left on a quarterback keeper, shook four defenders, and ran the ball in for his first rushing touchdown with the Knights.

Isaiah Bowser's 1-yard touchdown run early in the second quarter made the score 28–0. With 5:11 left in the first half, the Knights drove to the Bulldogs 12 yard line. Plumlee was sacked and fumbled. Defensive lineman Jeblonski Green Jr. scooped up the fumble at the 18 yard line, and appeared to be running the ball back the other way for a Bulldogs touchdown. A sprinting Ryan O'Keefe, however, chased Green down and tackled him two yards short of the endzone. Despite a 1st & Goal at the 2 yard line, the Bulldogs went three-and-out and settled for a field goal. The Knights led 28–3 at halftime.

The Knights offense went a little cold in the third quarter, and the special teams unit gave up a blocked punt that led to a Bulldogs touchdown. Johnny Richardson's 18-yard catch and run touchdown reignited the UCF offense, and they stretched out to a 35–10 lead. Isaiah Bowser's second rushing touchdown put the Knights up 42–10.

The fourth quarter saw Plumlee throw his fourth touchdown pass, this time to a wide open Zach Marsh-Wojan in the back corner of the endzone. With 12:18 left in the game, Quadric Bullard blocked Dyson Robert's punt near the 10 yard line, and recovered the ball in the endzone for another touchdown, and a 56–10 lead. The Bulldogs capped off their fourth quarter with a nearly 11-minute drive, but came up with no points. UCF started 1–0 overall (0–0 in the AAC) on the season, and won their 8th consecutive home game at FBC Mortgage Stadium.

=== Louisville ===
	1	2	3	4	Total
Cardinals	7	0	10	3	20
Knights	7	7	0	0	14

UCF took a 14–7 lead into halftime, but were shutout in the second half as Louisville defeated the Knights 20–14 on Friday night. Quarterback John Rhys Plumlee was held to only 16 completions for 131 yards and no touchdowns. The Knights were penalized 11 times for 111 yards, and two long touchdown passes were negated due to penalties.

Both teams scored touchdowns on their opening drive. Running back Isaiah Bowser long took a direct snap "wildcat" for a 2-yard touchdown early in the first quarter. The Knights then took a 14–7 lead after Bowser's second "wildcat" touchdown run. The Knights defense held the Cardinals scoreless in the second quarter. Louisville missed a field goal, fumbled away the ball, had two three-and-outs, and turned the ball over on downs. Daniel Obarski missed a field goal attempt just before halftime, and the Knights clung to a 7-point lead.

The Knights received the ball to start the third quarter, but punted on five straight drives. Late in the third quarter, Malik Cunningham's 43-yard quarterback run put the Cardinals ahead 20–14.

Late in the fourth quarter, the Knights defense stopped the Cardinals on a 4th & 4 near midfield. John Rhys Plumlee drove the Knights to the 5 yard line with 2:52 left in regulation. On 4th & Goal at the 5, Plumlee rolled out to his right, looking for Jaylon Griffin in the back of the endzone. Griffin and defender Jarvis Brownlee Jr. went up for the ball, and Brownlee came down with the interception.

UCF fell to 1–1 on the season, and snapped an eight-game winning streak at FBC Mortgage Stadium.

=== At Florida Atlantic ===
	1	2	3	4	Total
Knights	7	9	14	10	40
Owls	14	0	0	0	14

UCF overcame two first half red zone fumbles, and pulled away for a 40–14 win at FAU. Quarterback John Rhys Plumlee threw for 339 yards and one touchdown pass, and rushed for 121 yards and two touchdowns – including a leaping run where he hurdled over defenders at the goal line. The Knights improved to 2–1 on the season.

The Owls received the opening kickoff, and drove 87 yards in 6 plays for the game's first touchdown. UCF answered with a 10-play, 59-yard drive to the FAU 23. But Johnny Richardson fumbled away the ball at the 9 yard line and drive came up empty. UCF forced a punt, and got the ball back at midfield. Plumlee's 7-yard quarterback keeper was just inside the pylon, and he got to the end zone untouched. The score was tied score at 7–7.

FAU took a 14–7 lead with 8 seconds left in the first quarter. The Owls drove 88 yards in 12 plays, and capped off the drive with a 4-yard pitch pass from N'Kosi Perry to LaJohntay Wester. UCF added a field goal, and the score was 14–10 in favor of the Owls.

With 9:41 left in the half, facing a 3rd & 2 at their own 12 yard line, Plumlee found a wide open Alec Holler for 64 yards down the Owls 24 yard line. Three plays later, facing a 2nd & Goal at the 5, Plumlee rolled out to his right, then sprinted towards the endzone. He hurdled two defenders, then was upended in mid-air. He flipped over and landed in the endzone for the spectacular go-ahead touchdown.

Trailing 16–14, the Owls again drove rather effortlessly into the red zone. However, N'Kosi Perry fumbled away the ball at the UCF 17, snuffing out the drive. The Knights then had an opportunity for another quick score before halftime. FAU was flagged 15 yards for a personal foul, then Johnny Richardson's 50-yard run advanced them to the FAU 10. Richardson, however, lost a fumble at the 5 yard line, and the drive came up empty. UCF led 16–14 at halftime.

UCF got the ball to start the third quarter. A 12-play, 73-yard drive was capped off by Isaiah Bowser's 1-yard "wildcat" touchdown. He took a direct snap and trotted untouched to his right for the easy score. UCF led 23–14. The turning point of the game came on UCF's next drive. John Rhys Plumlee was intercepted by Dwight Toombs at the 50 yard line. Toombs ran the ball back 49 yards all the way to the UCF 1 yard line. Tight end Alec Holler's dive tripped up Toombs, preventing the touchdown. The UCF defense stiffened, forcing a three-and-out. Morgan Suarez's 19-yard field goal attempt was blocked, and FAU's big turnover came up with no points.

UCF went on to shutout the Owls in the second half, allowing 0 yards in the third quarter, and only 18 yards in the fourth quarter. The Knights tacked on two more touchdowns, and pulled away for a 40–14 victory.

=== Georgia Tech ===
	1	2	3	4	Total
Yellow Jackets	0	7	3	0	10
Knights	3	10	3	11	27

UCF faced Georgia Tech for the fifth time, and first time at home. The game effectively replaced a scheduled 2017 home matchup that was cancelled due to Hurricane Irma. Quarterback John Rhys Plumlee struggled in the air, with only 8 completions for 49 yards. But the defense and special teams unit made crucial plays in the game. Freshman kicker Colton Boomer went four-for-four on field goals, and Quadric Bullard returned a blocked punt for a touchdown, as UCF came away with a 27–10 victory. The UCF ground game did their part, putting up 284 yards rushing in the win.

George O'Leary, former head coach of UCF, and former head coach of Georgia Tech, did the coin toss at the start of the game. Georgia Tech won the toss and elected to defer. The Knights took the opening kickoff, and went on 20-play, 71-yard drive, that took 9:47 off the clock. The Knights had two third down conversions and two fourth down conversions. The drive finally stalled at the 4 yard line, and Colton Boomer kicked a chip-shot field goal to give UCF an early 3–0 lead. Georgia Tech's first possession ended with a missed field goal. UCF was able to then drive to the Yellow Jackets 34 yard line, but Plumlee's deep pass was intercepted at the 2 yard line. The teams traded punts, and Georgia Tech took over at their own 27 yard line.

Jeff Sims threw 14 yards to Hassan Hal to advance to their 41. Then Sims found Malachi Carter who broke free for a 59-yard touchdown. Yellow Jackets led 7–3 with 5:54 to go in the second quarter. UCF added a field goal, and the score was 7–6 with 1:39 left. Facing 4th & 9 at their own 39 yard line with 35 seconds to go, the Yellow Jackets line up for a punt. The punt was blocked by Jarvis Ware and Quadric Bullard ran the ball back 29 yards for a touchdown. The Knights 13–7 at halftime, despite only 58 yards of total offense.

Georgia Tech received the second half kickoff, but went three-and-out. UCF drove 55 yards in nine plays, and Colton Boomer's third field goal of the day made the score 16–7. The Yellow Jackets drove deep into UCF territory and faced a 4th & 3 at the UCF 5. Georgia Tech decided to go for it on fourth down, but Dylan McDuffie was stuffed short of the line to gain. UCF took over at their own 4, but went three-and-out, and punted from their own endzone. Georgia Tech got the ball back with good field position at the UCF 31. On 1st & Goal at the UCF 7, Sims was sacked by Jeremiah Jean-Baptiste, and fumbled. Tre'mon Morris-Brash scooped up the fumble around the 13 yard line, and ran it back almost 90 yards the other way for an apparent touchdown. But at the 1 yard line he was chased down and the ball was knocked away for a touchback. The score remained 16–7.

The Yellow Jackets got on the board in the second half after a Jude Kelley 42-yard field goal with 41 seconds left in the third quarter. The Knights extended their lead with a 4-play, 57-yard drive. John Rhys Plumlee faked a handoff up the middle to R.J. Harvey, then rolled to his right, eluding tackles for a 28-yard touchdown run. With a successful two-point conversion, the Knights led 24–10.

The Knights defense made a big stop on the next drive. Georgia Tech was looking at a 4th & 10 at the UCF 16. Sims threw a screen pass to Nate McCollum, but he was tackled and fumbled after a gain of only 3 yards. The Knights tacked on another field goal, Boomer's fourth of the day, for a final score of 27–10. The Knights improved to 3–1 for the season.

Just minutes after the game, a SpaceX Falcon 9 rocket launch occurred, which was visible from the stadium. On Monday, Yellow Jackets head coach Geoff Collins was fired.

=== SMU ===
	1	2	3	4	Total
Mustangs	7	6	0	6	19
Knights	3	7	14	17	41

UCF hosted SMU in their AAC conference opener. The game was originally scheduled for Saturday October 1, but it was moved to Wednesday October 5 due to Hurricane Ian. The Mustangs led 13–10 at halftime, but UCF scored 31 unanswered points in the second half to finish with a dominating victory. Quarterback John Rhys Plumlee threw for 316 yards and two touchdowns, and the Knights put up 160 yards rushing and three rushing touchdowns. Dropped passes, turnovers, and two turnovers on downs, stymied the high-powered Mustangs, who soundly defeated UCF 55–28 a year earlier.

SMU took the opening kickoff, but on the fourth play of the game, Rashee Rice fumbled away a reception. UCF scored a field goal off of the turnover, and took an early 3–0 lead. Velton Gardner's 39-yard touchdown run late gave the Mustangs a 7–3 lead midway through the first quarter.

The UCF offense struggled in the first half, with punts on their next three drives. SMU tacked on a field goal, and led 10–3 early in the second. Plumlee finally got comfortable, connecting with Kobe Hudson for a 29-yard gain to the SMU 30. He then found Javon Baker with an over-the-shoulder grab to the SMU 3. Three plays later, Isaiah Bowser punched the ball in with hopping 1-yard touchdown run. The Mustangs led 13–10 at halftime.

UCF received the kickoff to start the third quarter, and proceeded to dominate the second half. On 1st & 10 at the UCF 42, Plumlee faked a handoff, then threw over to Javon Baker, who made two cutbacks and broke free for a 51-yard gain down to the SMU 7. Bowser's second touchdown run gave UCF the lead for the first time, 17–13. The Mustangs turned the ball over on downs on their next possession. On 4th & 1 at the SMU 39, Koby Perry tackled Nolan Matthews-Harris for a loss of 1. UCF went three-and-out, but were able to punt and pin the Mustangs back at their own 3 yard line. On their next possession, the Knights went 86 yards in 8 plays, capped off by a 26-yard touchdown pass from Plumlee to a diving Ryan O'Keefe. Tanner Mordecai drove the Mustangs to the UCF 19 yard line, aided by a pass interference penalty on Brandon Adams. Facing 4th & 3 at the UCF 19, head coach Rhett Lashlee passed up on the short field goal attempt. Mordecai's pass intended for Rashee Rice was broken up by Adams, and the Mustangs again turned the ball over on downs.

Leading 24–13 early in the fourth quarter, Andrew Osteen's punt pinned SMU back at the own 4 yard line. Tanner Mordecai was sacked in the endzone for a safety and UCF extended their lead to 26–13. On the ensuing possession, Plumee pitched the ball to Ryan O'Keefe on an end-around, who turned the ball upfield for a 58-yard touchdown. O'Keefe tight-roped down the sidelines for the score, his second of the night. After a two-point conversion, the Knights extended their lead to 34–13 with 11:51 left in regulation.

RJ Harvey's powering 30-yard run set the Knights up with a 1st & Goal at the SMU 10. Isaiah Bowser's "wildcat" touchdown from the 3 yard line put the Knights up 41–13. The Mustangs were shut out in the second half, except for a "garbage time" touchdown with 1 second left by Preston Stone. The Knights improved to 4–1 for the season (1–0 in AAC). The Knights have won 7 out of their last 8 games. In their 99th home game at FBC Mortgage Stadium, the Knights improved their record there to 76–23.

=== Temple ===
	1	2	3	4	Total
Owls	10	3	0	0	13
Knights	14	21	21	14	70

UCF hosted Temple on Thursday night. It was the sixth annual "Space Game" and the 100th UCF home game played in FBC Mortgage Stadium. The Knights routed the Owls 70–13 to improve to 5–1 (2–0 in AAC). Quarterback John Rhys Plumlee threw for 376 yards and four touchdown passes, and rushed for three more touchdowns in the victory. Explosive plays were the story of the night, as the Knights racked up 737 total yards of offense.

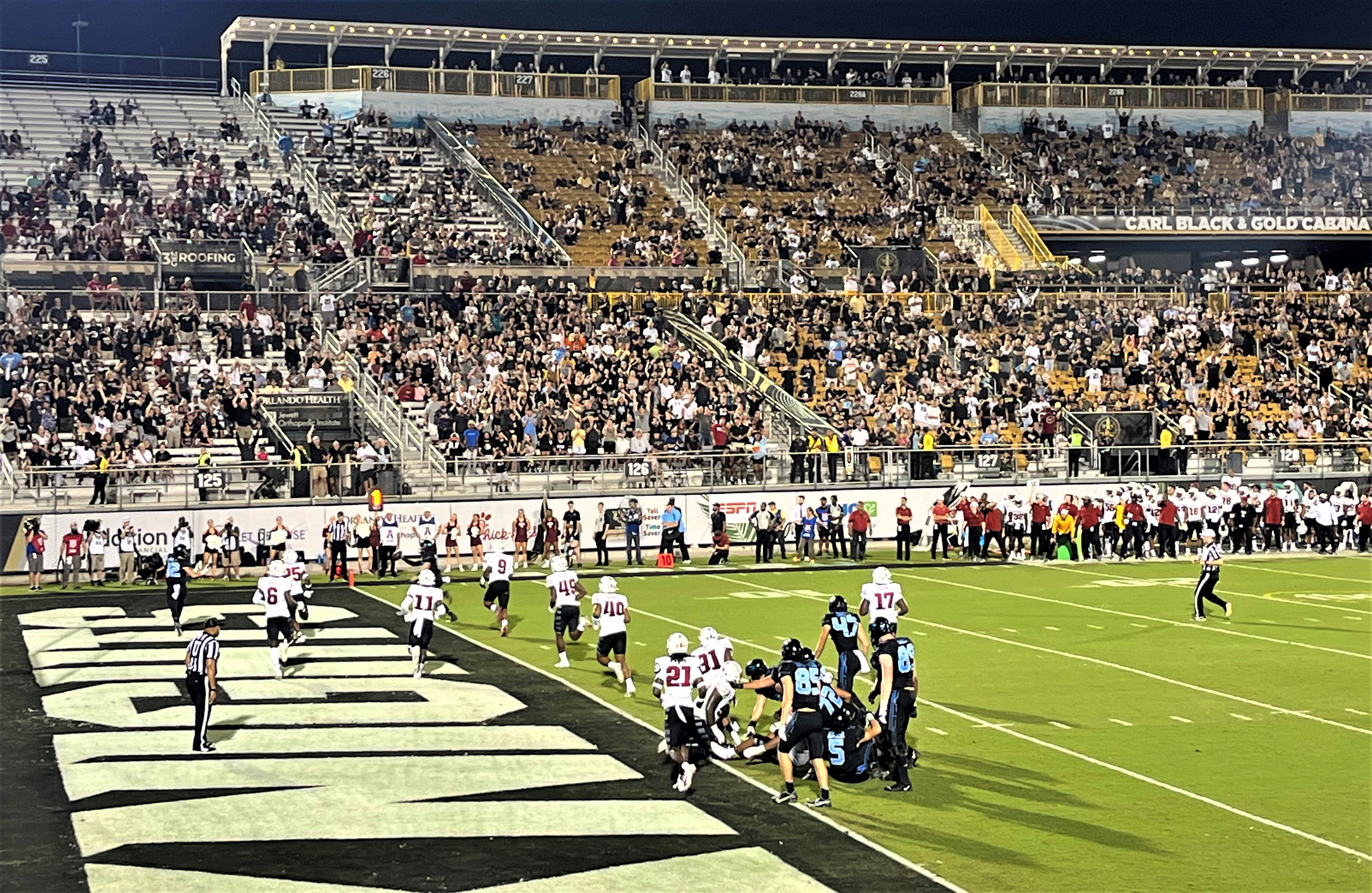
John Rhys Plumlee runs for a touchdown for UCF.

Temple received the opening kickoff, and drove 66 yards in 9 plays. Camden Price kicked a 26-yard field goal for a 3–0 lead. On UCF's first drive, John Rhys Plumlee ran 9 yards on a quarterback keeper for a touchdown, and a 7–3 lead. Temple answered with an 11-play, 75-yard touchdown drive. E.J. Warner's 7-yard touchdown pass to Jose Barbon gave the Owls a 10–3 lead. Late in the first quarter, the Knights broke the game open, and took a lead that they would not surrender. RJ Harvey took a handoff up the middle. He broke free untouched for a 61-yard gain down to the Temple 1. One play later, Plumlee faked a handoff and rolled to his right for an easy walk-in touchdown.

Temple added a 49-yard field goal and the score was 14–13 with 8:43 left in the half. Ryan O'Keefe's subsequent kickoff return went 51 yards to the Temple 46. Johnny Richardson took a jet sweep and turned it upfield for a 20-yard gain. On 1st & Goal at the Tempe 6, Plumlee threw a lateral to offensive lineman Tylan Grable, who rumbled down to the 1 yard line. Isaiah Bowser capped off the drive with a 1-yard "wildcat" touchdown run. The Owls went three-and-out, and gave the ball right back to UCF. Plumlee found a wide open Kobe Hudson on the right side for a 25-yard touchdown pass, and 28–13 lead with 1:42 left. The Knights defense forced another three-and-out, and the offense got another chance to score with 1 minute to go. After a couple quick completions to O'Keefe and Bowser, Plumee connected to Stephen Martin up the middle for 34 yards. With 13 seconds left in the half, Plumlee rolled to his right, shook a tackler, then with nobody open, turned upfield. He was met at the goal line by two defenders, but dove inside the pylon for the touchdown. UCF led 35–13 at halftime.

UCF shut out Tempe in the second half, and scored touchdowns on five straight drives. On the first drive of the third quarter, facing 3rd & 9 at their own 18, Plumlee under pressure, threw outside short to a wide open Isaiah Bowser. He tight-roped down the left sidelines, and was finally forced out-of-bounds at the Temple 37. Ryan O'Keefe's 11-yard touchdown pass made the score 42–13. After Temple's third straight three-and-out, UCF had the ball at their own 32. In one play, Plumlee went deep to O'Keefe in stride, who went in easily for a 68-yard touchdown. Temple's fourth straight three-and-out gave the ball back to UCF at their own 36. On the second play of the drive, Plumlee this time found Kobe Hudson in stride for a 64-yard touchdown, and a 56–13 lead.

Freshman Thomas Castellanos took over at quarterback, and tacked on two more touchdowns in the fourth quarter. The 70 points was the third-most in school history, and most ever against an FBS opponent. Plumlee's seven total touchdowns (4 passing, 3 rushing) tied a school record. The Knights defense notched their ninth straight game allowing 20 or fewer points, and on the season, their scoring defense (14.3 points/game) ranks 7th nationally. With the explosive performance, the UCF offense moved to 5th in the nation in total offense (525.2 yard/game), and 4th in rushing offense (261.2 yards/game). In their milestone 100th game at FBC Mortgage Stadium, the Knights improved their overall record there to 77–23.

=== At East Carolina ===
	1	2	3	4	Total
Knights	0	3	7	3	13
Pirates	3	14	7	10	34

UCF traveled to ECU on Saturday night. It was the 21st all-time meeting between the two teams. The Knights could not overcome three first half turnovers, and fell by the score of 34–13. Quarterback John Rhys Plumlee threw three interceptions, lost a fumble, and was sacked four times in the loss.

ECU took the opening kickoff, and drove 67 yards in 10 plays. When the drive finally stalled at the UCF 8 yard line, Andrew Conrad's 25-yard field goal attempt hit the upright no good. UCF's first drive looked promising, with Isaiah Bowser's 30-yard run moving the Knights across midfield. But Plumlee was intercepted at the ECU 36, and the turnover led to a Pirates field goal. ECU led 3–0 at the end of the first quarter.

Early in the second quarter, driving at the ECU 36, Plumlee rushed up the middle for 19 yards. But the ball stripped and recovered by the Pirates at the 20 yard line. The Pirates drove the field, and Holton Ahlers's 3-yard touchdown run put ECU up 10–3. Another first half drive for UCF ended with yet another turnover. Facing a 4th & 5 at the ECU 37, Plumlee threw his second interception. ECU again drove the field, twice converting on 3rd down. They capped off the drive with a 39-yard touchdown pass from Ahlers to C.J. Johnson.

UCF got the ball back with 44 seconds left in the half. Plumlee found Kobe Hudson at the ECU 9 with 3 seconds left. Colton Boomer kicked a 27-yard field goal as time expired, and ECU led 17–3 at halftime.

The Knights received the second half kickoff. They executed a 10-play, 74-yard drive, including a 4th down conversion. Bowser's 3-yard touchdown run trimmed the deficit to 17–10, and it appeared the Knights were back in the game. The rest of the second half, however, would be dismal for the Knights. The Pirates added two more touchdowns and a field goal, and pulled away for a 34–13 victory. The Knights slipped to 5–2 on the season (2–1 in AAC). It was a loss in their last game (for the foreseeable future) against the Pirates and likewise in their last visit to Dowdy–Ficklen Stadium. The Pirates took an 11–10 all-time head-to-head series lead.

=== No. 20 Cincinnati ===
	1	2	3	4	Total
No. 20 Bearcats	0	6	7	8	21
Knights	10	0	2	13	25

UCF knocked off No. 20 Cincinnati on Homecoming. Mikey Keene took over for injured quarterback John Rhys Plumlee, throwing for 176 yards, and led the Knights on the game-winning touchdown drive in the final minute. The Knights overcame two red zone fumbles, and defeated the Bearcats for the first time since 2018. They held Bearcats to a season-low 35 yards rushing, outgained them 505 to 333 yards, and dominated the time of possession (37:05). This was the final regular season meeting between the two rivals as part of the AAC. Both schools will move to the Big 12 in 2023.

Cincinnati won the opening coin toss and elected to defer. The Knights punted on their first possession, as did the Bearcats. On their second possession, John Rhys Plumlee drove the Knights to the Bearcats 8 yard line. Colton Boomer's field goal bounced off the upright, and fell good, and the UCF took an early 3–0 lead. The Bearcats went three-and-out, and the Knights got the ball back at the own 16. At the 28 yard line, the drive was highlighted by a one-handed catch by R.J. Harvey on a screen pass, who turned upfield for a 25-yard gain to the Bearcats 47. The drive was capped off by a 26-yard touchdown run by Harvey, and the Knights led 10–0.

The Bearcats got on the board in the second quarter with a 10-play, 65-yard drive. Ryan Coe kicked a 33-yard field goal, and the score was 10–3. Midway through the second quarter, John Rhys Plumlee was hit hard and injured on a 9-yard quarterback scramble. Plumlee was taken out of the game, and replaced by back-up quarterback (and 2021 starter) Mikey Keene. The Bearcats added a field goal with 13 seconds left, and the score was 10–6 at halftime.

The Bearcats got the ball to start the third quarter, but went three-and-out once again. UCF started their drive at the 29 yard line, and drove 11 plays to the Cincinnati 9 yard line. Facing a 3rd & 1 at the 9, Isaiah Bowser took a handoff up the middle, but the ball was punched out and recovered by Cincinnati at the 2 yard line. Pinned back inside their own 10, the Bearcats were facing a 3rd & 4 at their own 9. Ben Bryant dropped back in his own endzone, and was sacked by a blitzing Josh Celiscar. The ball came loose, and was recovered by Tre'mon Morris-Brash for an apparent touchdown. After an instant replay review, it was determined that Bryant's knee was down, and the call was changed to a safety. The Knights now led 12–6. After a safety kick, the Knights had the ball at their own 33. The Knights converted twice on third down, and found themselves with a 2nd & 5 at the Cincinnati 14 yard line. Keene's handoff to R.J. Harvey was mishandled and fumbled. The Bearcats recovered the ball, UCF's second red zone turnover. Cincinnati then drove 84 yards for their first touchdown. With 7 seconds left in the third quarter, Ben Bryant found Josh Whyle for a 14-yard touchdown pass, and a 13–12 lead.

The two teams traded punts to start the fourth quarter. With 10:00 left in regulation, UCF started their drive at their own 26. Keene led the Knights on a decisive, 13-play, 77-yard drive. UCF faced only one third down on the drive, with a mix of runs by Harvey, Bowser, and Johnny Richardson. On 2nd & Goal at the Bearcats 3, Isaiah Bowser bulldozed into the endzone on a 3-yard "wildcat" touchdown run. A two-point conversion attempt failed, and UCF led 18–13 with 4:36 to go.

Cincinnati quarterback Ben Bryant made two quick completions to Tre Tucker, then found Nick Mardner down to the UCF 39. Ryan Montgomery gassed the UCF defense with a 39-yard go-ahead touchdown run with 3:04 left. The Bearcats tacked on the two-point conversion, a Bryant pass across the field to an elusive and slicing Tyler Scott (who made the one-handed catch), and led 21–18. With all three timeouts left, UCF took over, and drove for the winning score. Keene found Kobe Hudson, who shook a tackle down to the 44. He then connected with Ryan O'Keefe, who turned upfield, shaking four defenders down to the Cincinnati 30. At the 17 yard line, facing 2nd & 7 with 54 seconds left, Harvey took a handoff up the middle. He bounced off of one tackler, then spun out of another tackle to reach endzone running backwards. The Knights took the lead 25–21 with 48 seconds left on the clock.

The Bearcats had one last chance, starting their drive at their own 25. On first down, K.D. McDaniel sacked Ben Bryant, who then lost the ball. Cincinnati recovered the fumble back at the 5 for a loss of 20, and quickly rushed up to spike the ball to stop the clock. Bryant threw an incompletion, then faced 4th & 30 with 12 seconds remaining. Bryant's pass to Jadon Thompson was well short of the line to gain, and UCF took over on downs, and sealed the victory.

The Knights improved to 6–2 on the season (3–1 in AAC) and became bowl-eligible for the 7th consecutive season. The Knights snapped Cincinnati's streak of 19 consecutive wins in AAC intra-conference play, a mark that had tied UCF's own record streak from 2017 to 2019. It was UCF's first win over a ranked opponent since 2018, and Cincinnati's first loss to an unranked opponent since an overtime loss at Temple in 2018. After the game, the Knights moved into the Top 25, their first ranking since 2020.

=== At Memphis ===
	1	2	3	4	Total
No. 25 Knights	7	14	0	14	35
Tigers	7	7	7	7	28

UCF defeated Memphis by the score of 35–28 at the Liberty Bowl. Mikey Keene started at quarterback for the Knights, throwing for 219 yards and 3 touchdown passes in the victory. Two fourth quarter touchdowns put the Knights ahead for good. Twice Memphis turned the ball over on downs, and two interceptions (one in the red zone) were crucial to the Knights victory. UCF improved to 7–2 (5–1 in AAC) on the season.

UCF won the opening coin toss and elected to receive. With Mikey Keene under center, the Knights drove 78 yards in 9 plays for the game's first score. R.J. Harvey's 22-yard touchdown run capped off a strong opening drive. Memphis answered with a 10-play, 75-yard drive of their own, and the score was tied 7–7. On their second drive, Keene was sacked twice, and UCF punted from their own endzone. The Tigers got good field position, and quickly drove into the red zone. Memphis went for it on a 4th & 1 at the UCF 6, but Brandon Thomas was stuffed for a loss of 1 and they turned the ball over on downs. Pinned back at their own 4, with 3 seconds left in the first quarter, Keene's pass was intercepted by Davion Ross, and Memphis got the ball back at the UCF 14.

After a gain of 5 on first down, Seth Henigan's pass was tipped, bounced among at least three players, and fell into the hands of Davonte Brown for an interception. Two plays later, R.J. Harvey blasted up the middle for a 61-yard run down to the Memphis 25. At the 4 yard line, Isaiah Bowser lined up in a "wildcat" formation. He faked the run, then tossed the ball over the defenders to Stephen Martin for the touchdown. Memphis was once again able to answer. Two costly pass interference penalties against UCF, along with a facemask, moved the Tigers to the red zone. Henigan's 1-yard touchdown run tied the score 14–14 with 8:81 left in the half.

The closing minutes of the second quarter unfolded in an unusual manner. For a moment it appeared that John Rhys Plumlee might enter the game, but Mikey Keene stayed in. He swiftly drove the Knights down the field, and found Kobe Hudson for a 24-yard touchdown. The Knights were back ahead 21–14. Memphis again was able to drive down the field, twice converting on 3rd down. The Knights defense stiffened, and the drive finally stalled at the UCF 8. Chris Howard's field goal pushed wide right, and the drive came up empty. Colton Boomer tried a 64-yard field goal in the final seconds, but it fell short and the Tigers picked it up returned it near midfield. Memphis had another shot at a field goal, but it fell short as time expired. UCF led 21–14 at halftime.

Memphis controlled much of the third quarter. At the 6:53 mark, they tied the game 21–21 with Jevyon Ducker's 1-yard touchdown run. On their next drive, they reached the UCF 21 yard line, looking for a go-ahead score. However, a Targeting foul on John Hassell pushed them out field goal range. They ultimately turned the ball over on downs when Seth Henigan's pass was tipped and fell incomplete.

UCF was driving into Memphis territory to start the fourth quarter. Kobe Hudson's second touchdown catch of the day put the Knights up 28–21 with 12:19 left on the clock. Five plays later, Seth Henigan's pass was tipped by his intended receiver, and intercepted by Divaad Wilson. Though the Knights went three-and-out and punted, they were able to pin the Tigers back at their own 8. The Tigers went nowhere, and punted the ball right back to UCF. The Knights got the ball at midfield with 7:07 left in regulation, and looked to take time off the clock. After a key 3rd down conversion by Javon Baker, Keene found Baker in the left corner of the endzone for a 24-yard touchdown pass, and a 35–21 lead with 4:58 left. Memphis managed a quick touchdown, and with three timeouts left, kicked off to UCF with 3:18 to go.

Leading 35–28, UCF faced a 3rd & 9 at their own 26 with 3:07 left in regulation. Alec Holler turned a busted play into an 10-yard gain to keep the drive alive. He caught a pass for what could have been a 7-yard loss, but spun around, eluded two tackles, ran free, and hurdled over the line to gain. The Knights then ran the clock out, with Isaiah Bowser's 19-yard run with two minutes left essentially sealing the victory.

=== At No. 17 Tulane ===
	1	2	3	4	Total
No. 22 Knights	17	7	7	7	38
No. 17 Green Wave	7	7	3	14	31

UCF traveled to Tulane in a matchup of the top two teams in The American. The Knights built a 24–7 lead in the first half, and outlasted Tulane for a 38–31 victory. Quarterback John Rhys Plumlee returned to the starting lineup, passing for 132 yards and one touchdown. Plumlee also led the Knights rushing attack, putting up 176 yards on 18 carries, and two touchdowns on the ground. Overall, the Knights rushing offense racked up a season high 336 yards. It was the most rushing yards the Tulane defense had given up all season.

The Knights took the opening kickoff and scored the first points of the game. At the 50 yard line, John Rhys Plumlee faked a handoff and took a quarterback keeper up the middle for 47 yards down to the Tulane 3. Colton Boomer kicked a 25-yard field goal, and UCF led 3–0. The Green Wave went three-and-out on the first possession, and UCF had the ball back at their on 30. On 2nd & 7 at the 38, Plumlee took a shotgun snap, noticed a big hole up the middle, and took off for a 67-yard touchdown run. Tulane answered with a 70-yard run by Tyjae Spears, which set up a 1-yard touchdown pass from Michael Pratt to Duece Watts. On their next possession, the Knights went on a 17-play, 75-yard drive. A mix of short passes and runs led to an easy 2-yard "wildcat" touchdown run by Isaiah Bowser, and a 17–7 Knights lead.

Late in the first quarter, Kam Moore forced a fumble by Green Wave running back Shaadie Clayton-Johnson. K.D. McDaniel scooped up the fumble and ran it back to the Tulane 8. A horse-collar penalty on the runback moved them up to a 1st & Goal at the 4. UCF failed to score, however, going for it and failing on fourth down from the 1.

Starting at their own 1, Tulane managed a couple first downs, but the drive stalled at their own 46. They punted to UCF, pinning them back at their own 15. UCF drove 85 yards in 13 plays, including two third down conversions. Plumlee found Javon Baker for a 8-yard touchdown pass, and a 24–7 lead midway through the second quarter. Tulane took over with 7:18 left, and drove down the field with just over one minute to go. They were aided by two costly pass interference penalties on UCF. Valentino Ambrosio missed a 39-yard field goal attempt, but UCF was called for roughing the kicker, and Tulane kept the drive alive. Michael Pratt's 1-yard QB sneak made the score 24–14 going into the halftime.

UCF added a touchdown in the third quarter, stretching their lead to 31–14. A bruising 20-yard run by R.J. Harvey, and a crucial 15-yard catch on 3rd & 11 by Kobe Hudson kept the drive alive. Plumlee's 9-yard touchdown run was his second of the game. Tulane added a field goal, and UCF led 31–17 at the start of the fourth quarter.

The Green Wave drove 73 yards in ten plays, and trimmed the deficit to 31–24. Pratt threw a 2-yard touchdown pass to Reggie Brown with 11:39 to go. With momentum seemingly shifting towards Tulane, UCF took over at their 25. Facing a 4th & Inches at their own 34, a trick play turned into a big gain. Isaiah Bowser lined up in a "wildcat" formation, and took the shotgun snap. Sensing the Green Wave might have jumped offsides – and thus affording UCF a "free play" – instead of running, Bowser rolled to his right and lofted a deep pass to John Rhys Plumlee. Plumlee, who had lined up outside to the right as a wide receiver, failed to make a one-handed catch along the sidelines, but Jarius Monroe was flagged for pass interference, and the Knights got the first down. The Knights continued to grind down the field, and worked the clock down inside four minutes. Bowser's 1-yard touchdown run put the Knights back up by two scores. UCF led 38–24 with 3:31 left in regulation.

Tulane managed to score a touchdown with 1:46 to go, and narrowed the score to 38–31. Tulane tried an onside kick, but the Knights recovered the ball. They ran the clock down to 4 seconds left, and held on for the victory. UCF improved to 8–2 (5–1 in AAC) and moved into first place in the AAC.

=== Navy ===
	1	2	3	4	Total
Midshipmen	7	7	3	0	17
No. 20 Knights	0	6	8	0	14

UCF hosted Navy in their final home game of the regular season (Senior day), and final AAC regular season home game. The Knights suffered a stinging loss to the Midshipmen by the score of 17–14. With the loss, UCF lost the opportunity to host the AAC Championship Game, and put their chances of reaching the conference championship game altogether in doubt. Navy racked up 248 yards rushing and two touchdowns, while not completing a single pass (only 1 pass attempt was made) all game.

Navy got the ball first, and marched 75 yards in 11 plays for the game's first touchdown. Xavier Arline punched the ball in on a 4th & Goal at UCF 1. At the start of the second quarter, UCF was working their way down the field. Isaiah Bowser converted on a 4th & 1 at the Navy 10, setting up 1st & Goal at the 7. However, UCF would have to settle for a field goal. On their next possession, John Rhys Plumlee found Javon Baker for a 37-yard gain down to the Navy 18. But again, UCF had to settle for a field goal. Navy still led 7–6. The Midshipmen went on another long drive, 84 yards in 13 plays, burning nearly 7 minutes off the clock. Vincent Terrell Jr.'s 8-yard touchdown run capped off the drive, and Navy led 14–6 at halftime.

After struggling in the first half, and reportedly suffering from a sore shoulder (from the previous week) John Rhys Plumlee was benched in the second half. Mikey Keene took over at quarterback, and sparked the offense to start the third quarter. Keene went 3-for-3, completing a 45-yard bomb to Ryan O'Keefe. Two plays later, he found Javon Baker for a 28-yard touchdown grab. Plumlee came back in the game for the subsequent two point conversion attempt. Rolling to his right, Plumee fired a strike to Baker, and the game was tied 14–14.

The UCF defense forced a three-and-out, and the Knights offense quickly got the ball back. On third down, Mikey Keene was sacked by a blindside blitz and fumbled. Navy recovered at the UCF 34. Again, Navy was held to a three-and-out. Bijan Nichols kicked a 45-yard field goal, and Navy took the lead 17–14 with 8:22 left in the third quarter.

Neither team scored again. UCF came up empty on their next four drives, and Keene was sacked four times in the second half. Navy got the ball last with 5:54 remaining in regulation. UCF's last chance came with 3:49 to go. Navy lined up for a 4th & 1 at the UCF 48. Xavier Arline's quarterback sneak appeared short of the line to gain, but was spotted for a first down. The play was reviewed, and the ruling on the field was upheld. Navy was able to run the clock out, and won the game.

=== At South Florida ===
	1	2	3	4	Total
No. 22 Knights	14	14	3	15	46
Bulls	0	7	22	10	39

UCF visited South Florida in the War on I-4 rivalry on Thanksgiving weekend. It was their final regular season game in the AAC. With UCF departing the AAC for the Big 12 in 2023, it was presumably the final meeting between the two teams in football until at least 2028. Going into the game, UCF, Cincinnati, and Houston were in contention to play Tulane in the American Athletic Conference Championship Game. Tulane secured their spot with a win over Cincinnati on Black Friday. UCF needed a win plus a Houston loss to Tulsa; or a win plus being the higher-ranked team in the CFP rankings (if applicable); or a win plus being the higher-ranked team in an average of major selector computer rankings (Anderson & Hester, Billingsley Report, Colley Matrix, Wolfe).

Alec Holler made a spectacular one-handed touchdown catch with 20 seconds left in regulation to lift the Knights over the Bulls. UCF built a 28–0 lead in the first half, then blew that lead in the second half with three turnovers. South Florida rallied to go ahead 39–38 with 7 minutes to go. UCF drove for the game-winning touchdown in the final two minutes, and secured themselves a berth in the AAC Championship Game.

UCF won the coin toss and elected to receive. On the sixth play of the game, quarterback John Rhys Plumlee on a read-option, ran up the middle and took off down the right sidelines untouched for a 64-yard touchdown. He followed that on the next drive with a 32-yard connection to Ryan O'Keefe. The drive was capped off by a 3-yard touchdown run by R.J. Harvey, and a 14–0 lead.

The Bulls were driving into the red zone to start the second quarter. On 2nd & Goal at the UCF 7, Byrum Brown scrambled to the left side, but was stripped of the ball at the 1 yard line. UCF recovered the fumble in the endzone for a touchback. John Rhys Plumlee, on a 20-yard quarterback keeper, scored another touchdown, but pulled up with an injured hamstring at the end of the play. Two plays later, Byrum Brown was intercepted by Justin Hodges, setting UCF up at the 47. Plumlee stayed in the game, finding Ryan O'Keefe for a 3-yard touchdown, and a 28–0 lead. South Florida then drove 75-yard in 15 plays, finally putting points on the board with 40 seconds left in the second quarter. UCF led 28–7 at halftime.

South Florida got the ball to start the second half. On 2nd & 10 at the UCF 39, Brown handed off to Brian Battie, who tossed it back to Brown. But Davonte Brown read it the whole way; he tackled Brown forcing a fumble. Josh Celisar scooped up the ball, and UCF took over at the USF 40. Mikey Keene then entered the game, taking at quarterback over for Plumlee. Colton Boomer's 27-yard field goal gave the Knights a 31–7 lead with 9:15 left in the third quarter.

A disastrous sequence of events saw the Knights give up a touchdown drive, then cough up two fumbles, both of which led to Bulls touchdowns. South Florida scored 22 unanswered points, and the score was now 31–29 at the end of the third quarter.

Mikey Keene drove the Knights 75 yards in 13 plays, and early in the fourth quarter, found Kobe Hudson for a 4-yard touchdown pass with 12:27 to go. The Knights led by 9, and the UCF defense finally got a stop. The Bulls had a 1st & Goal at the 10, but on third down, Ricky Barber sacked Byrum Brown back at the 17. The Bulls settled for a field goal, and trimmed the deficit to 38–32 with 9:31 left. The Knights went three-and-out, and Mitch McCarthy's 33-yard punt return set South Florida up at the UCF 45. Three plays later, Brown weaved his way up the middle, and ran for a 42-yard touchdown, giving South Florida their first lead of the night.

Trailing 39–38, R.J. Harvey had the ball stripped and USF recovered at the UCF 48 with 4:45 to go. It was UCF's third turnover of the second half. With the game on the line, the Knights defense stuffed Brian Battie for no gain on 3rd down. The Bulls were held to a three-and-out, and punted with 2:49 on the clock. Xavier Townsend made a fair catch at the 18, and Mikey Keene would drive the Knights 82 yards in 8 plays for the game-winning score.

On 1st down, a scrambling Keene made a dangerous incomplete pass to the right sidelines, which was almost intercepted. On 2nd down, he threw underneath to Isaiah Bowser, who stiff-armed and fell forward for a first down. At the UCF 30, Keene took a shotgun snap, and under heavy pressure, scrambled to his left. He threw deep downfield for Javon Baker, who made a diving catch, securing the ball against his body with one hand. The play was reviewed and upheld, and UCF had a first down at the USF 29. On 2nd & 6 at the 25, Keene faked a handoff to Bowser, but turned upfield on a QB keeper for a first down at the USF 16. The clock was ticking under one minute to go when UCF faced 3rd & 8 at the USF 14. Rather than play for just a field goal, head coach Gus Malzahn decided to try for the endzone. He did not want to put undue pressure on freshman kicker Colton Boomer. With many expecting a run, Keene took a shotgun snap, and lofted a high pass to Alec Holler. Holler leaped up and made a one-handed catch at the goal line near the pylon; his right toe touched down just before his leg touched out of bounds. The play was reviewed and upheld. Keene followed it up with a shovel pass to Bowser for a two-point conversion, and UCF led 46–39 with 20 seconds left in regulation.

After a botched squib kick, UCF sweated out a last-second Hail Mary. Brown's pass was broken up at the back of the endzone as time expired, and UCF secured the victory. It was UCF's sixth consecutive win in the rivalry, and fifth straight win inside Raymond James Stadium (including two wins in the Gasparilla Bowl).

=== At No. 18 Tulane—AAC Championship Game ===
	1	2	3	4	Total
No. 22 Knights	0	7	7	14	28
No. 18 Green Wave	10	7	7	21	45

UCF traveled to Tulane for the American Athletic Conference Championship Game. The game was a rematch of the regular season meeting on November 12, and UCF's third overall appearance in the AAC Championship Game. The winner of the game was expected to receive an invitation to the Cotton Bowl as the highest-ranked Group of Five conference champion. The Tulane Green Wave overpowered the Knights, putting up 648 total yards of offense. Big plays on offense gassed the UCF defense, and despite a late rally, Tulane seemingly had an answer for every score, and pulled away for a 45–28 victory.

Tulane took a 10–0 lead in the first quarter. Quarterback Michael Pratt and running back Tyjae Spears put up big numbers, respectively. Pratt found Shae Wyatt for a 10-yard touchdown, then connected with Duece Watts for a 54-yard gain. The latter set up a field goal by Valentino Ambrosio. Meanwhile, quarterback John Rhys Plumlee started for UCF and aggravated a hamstring injury. He left the game and third-string quarterback Thomas Castellanos began taking most of the snaps. Back-up quarterback Mikey Keene elected not to dress for the game, in order to preserve his redshirt.

UCF was driving into Tulane territory to start the second quarter. On 4th & 1 at the Tulane 23, the Knights turned the ball over on downs. They held Tulane to a three-and-out, at which time they elected to go for it themselves on a 4th & 1. The Knights defense stuffed Tulane for no gain, and shockingly got the ball right back. Xavier Townsend's 5-yard jet sweep touchdown run made the score 10–7. Tulane, answered, going 75 yards in four plays. Lawrence Keys III burned the defense on a 43-yard catch and run touchdown, and made the score 17–7 with 5 minutes left. Thomas Castellanos was unable to spark much on offense, going three-and-out two times. With 18 seconds left in the half, Pratt was hit as he threw, and put up a wobbly pass which was intercepted by Davonte Brown, snuffing out a Tulane scoring opportunity. The Green Wave held a 17–7 lead going into halftime.

Tulane got the ball to start the second half. UCF had them in a 3rd & 8 at their own 26, but Alex Bauman converted on third down. Two plays later, Tyjae Spears knifed his way through the defense, all the way for a 60-yard touchdown run. On their next drive, Spears again blasted for a huge gain, this time a 56-yard run down to the UCF 26. The drive came up empty, however, as UCF forced a fumble at the 3 yard line. Trailing 24–7, Plumlee came back in the game for UCF late in the third quarter. He swiftly drove the Knights 80 yards in 8 plays. A 17-yard touchdown throw to Kobe Hudson cut the deficit to 24–14.

UCF, trailing by 10, punted to Tulane at the start of the fourth quarter. Michael Pratt found Duece Watts up the middle on a busted coverage. In one play, Tulane went 73 yards for a touchdown, and was back up by 17. The Knights were not ready to give up yet. With Plumlee back in the game, UCF faced a 3rd & 1 just past midfield. Plumlee took a shotgun snap, then lateralled to R.J. Harvey, who threw deep down field to a wide-open Hudson. The 49-yard touchdown put the Knights back in the game. Two plays later, Tulane fumbled away the ball at their own 30. Jason Johnson ripped the ball away from Tyjae Spears. Isaiah Bowser's powering 10-yard touchdown run made the score 31–28 with 9:48 to go.

The Knights got within 3 points, and seemingly had momentum, but Tulane continued to gas the UCF defense. The Green Wave answered with two more touchdowns on big plays, and put the game out reach. Tulane won their first AAC championship by the score of 45–28.

=== Vs. Duke—Military Bowl ===
	1	2	3	4	Total
Knights	7	0	0	6	13
Blue Devils	7	13	3	7	30

UCF faced Duke in the Military Bowl. It was the first meeting between the two teams in football. Several players, including back-up quarterback Mikey Keene, wide receiver Ryan O'Keefe, linebacker Jeremiah Jean-Baptiste, and corner back Davonte Brown entered the transfer portal. The Knights fell by the score of 30–13, with quarterback John Rhys Plumlee passing for only 182 yards (only 28 yards in the first half), one interception, six sacks, and two lost fumbles.

Trailing 7–0 in the first quarter, the Knights drove 75 yards in 14 plays. Isaiah Bowser's 1-yard touchdown run tied the score at 7–7. After a Duke field goal, the Knights were driving across midfield with just under 6 minutes left in the half. Quarterback John Rhys Plumlee faked a handoff to Bowser, then turned upfield for a 15-yard quarterback keeper. Plumlee had the ball punched out, and Duke recovered the fumble. The Blue Devils scored a touchdown off of the turnover, then tacked on a field goal as time expired in the half.

Trailing 23–7 late in the third quarter, UCF had a chance to get back in the game. The Knights pinned Duke back at their own 3, and forced them to punt from their own endzone. UCF got the ball to start their drive at the Duke 32. On 4th & 2 at the 24 yard line, Plumlee's pass to Xavier Townsend was short of the line to gain, and the Knights turned the ball over on downs.

The Knights were able to put a drive together in the fourth quarter. Bowser's second rushing touchdown cut the deficit to 23–13 with 9 minutes left. Any chance of a Knights comeback were dashed on their next drive, however, when Plumlee was sacked and fumbled. Duke added another touchdown off of the turnover, and won 30–13.

== Personnel ==
=== Roster ===
2022 UCF Knights Football
Quarterbacks: 9 Timmy McClain – (redshirt) Fr.; 10 John Rhys Plumlee – Sr.; 11 Will Bohn – (redshirt) So.; 12 Thomas Castellanos – Fr.; 13 Mikey Keene – So.; 16 Brock Hansel – Fr.; Running backs: 0 Johnny Richardson – Jr.; 5 Isaiah Bowser – 5th-Sr. (C); 6 Mark-Antony Richards – (redshirt) Jr.; 9 Jordan McDonald – Fr.; 20 Anthony Williams – (redshirt) Fr.; 22 R.J. Harvey – (redshirt) Jr.; 23 Demarkcus Bowman – (redshirt) So.; 26 Chris Bowerfind – (redshirt) Fr.; 33 Trilion Coles – (redshirt) Sr.; Wide receivers: 1 Javon Baker – Jr.; 2 Kobe Hudson – Jr.; 3 Xavier Townsend – Fr.; 4 Ryan O'Keefe – Sr. (C); 7 Joey Gatewood – (redshirt) Sr.; 14 Andrew Dickson – (redshirt) Fr.; 15 Jordan Johnson – (redshirt) So.; 17 Amari Johnson – Sr.; 18 Jaylon Griffin – (redshirt) Jr.; 27 Jarrad Baker – (redshirt) Jr.; 31 JaJuan Forte – (redshirt) Sr.; 38 Dionte Marks – (redshirt) Jr.; 47 Stephen Martin – (redshirt) So.; 81 Tyler Griffin – Fr.; 87 Dwartney Wortham – Fr.; 89 Cullen Smith – (redshirt) Fr.; 99 Quan Lee – Fr.; Tight ends: 8 Kemore Gamble – 5th-Sr.; 49 Max Holler – (redshirt) So.; 82 Alec Holler – (redshirt) Sr.; 83 Garrett French – (redshirt) So.; 84 Thomas Wadsworth – Fr.; 85 Zach Marsh Wojan – (redshirt) Sr.; 86 Jordan Davis – (redshirt) So.; 88 Grant Stevens – Fr.	Offensive Lineman: 50 Patrick Barnett – (redshirt) So.; 52 Caden Kitler – Fr.; 54 Cameron Kinnie – (redshirt) So.; 55 Matthew Lee – (redshirt) Jr.; 57 John Harris – (redshirt) Jr.; 64 Shaheem Hill – Fr.; 66 Chidoziri Maghiro – (redshirt) Sr.; 69 Paul Rubelt – (redshirt) So.; 70 Edward Collins – (redshirt) Sr.; 71 Tylan Grable – (redshirt) Sr.; 72 Nate Brady – (redshirt) Jr.; 72 Ryan Swoboda – 5th-Sr.; 73 Samuel Jackson – 5th-Sr. (C); 74 Ethan Mort – (redshirt) Fr.; 75 Miguel Maldonado – Fr.; 76 Adrian Medley – (redshirt) Jr.; 77 Lokahi Pauole – Sr.; Placekickers: 34 Garin Boniol – (redshirt) So.; 35 Colton Boomer – Fr.; 45 Ryker Casey – (redshirt) Jr.; 98 Daniel Obarski – Sr.; Punters: 36 Andrew Osteen – (redshirt) Sr.; 40 Mitch McCarthy – Fr.; Long snappers: 32 Alex Ward – 5th-Sr.; 42 Aidan Fedigan – Fr.; 95 Tyler Paul – (redshirt) Jr.	Defensive tackles: 2 Lee Hunter – (redshirt) Fr.; 5 Ricky Barber – (redshirt) Jr.; 40 Kervins Choute – (redshirt) So.; 52 Keenan Hester – (redshirt) Jr.; 56 Matthew Alexander – (redshirt) Fr.; 90 Keshaun Hudson – Fr.; 92 Austin Camden – 5th-Sr.; 94 Anthony Montalvo – 5th-Sr.; 13 Landon Woodson – (redshirt) Sr.; Linebacker: 10 Terrence Lewis – (redshirt) Fr.; 11 Jeremiah Jean-Baptiste – Sr. (C); 15 Jason Johnson – (redshirt) Jr.; 16 T.J. Bullard – Fr.; 25 Camden Vining – (redshirt) Fr.; 27 Walter Yates III – (redshirt) Sr.; 28 Quade Mosier – Jr.; 30 Kam Moore – Fr.; 35 Keenan Cupit – (redshirt) So.; 41 Tre'Von Moore – So.; 44 Branden Jennings – So.; 48 Stone Boss – Fr.; 57 Derek Burns – (redshirt) Jr.; Defensive back: 3 Ja'Cari Henderson – Fr.; 4 Koby Perry – 5th-Sr.; 8 Demari Henderson – Fr.; 9 Divaad Wilson – (redshirt) Sr.; 12 Justin Hodges – Jr.; 17 Trevion Shadrick-Harris – (redshirt) Jr.; 18 Dyllon Lester – (redshirt) Sr.; 19 Ah'Mare Lee – (redshirt) Fr.; 21 Nikai Martinez – Fr.; 22 Daniel McCullon – (redshirt) So.; 23 Jaiden Francois – (redshirt) So.; 24 Jarvis Ware – (redshirt) Sr.; 34 Terrell Jackson – Fr.; 39 R.D. Cooper – Jr.; 46 Philjae Bien-Aime – (redshirt) So.; Corner backs: 7 Davonte Brown – Jr.; 14 Corey Thornton – Jr.; 31 Brandon Adams – So.	Defensive ends: 33 Tre'Mon Morris-Brash – Sr.; 41 Jack Morgan Fr.; 47 K.D. McDaniel – (redshirt) Jr.; 51 Malachi Lawrence – (redshirt) Fr.; 55 Karlis Bailey-Vice – (redshirt) Fr.; 58 Dallaz Corbitt – (redshirt) Jr.; 84 Keahnist Thompson – Fr.; 88 Josh Celiscar – Jr. (C); 96 Trace O'Hara – (redshirt) So.; 99 Jamaal Johnson – Fr.; Safeties: 29 William Wells – So.; 37 Quadric Bullard – Jr.; 43 Zach Rodriguez – (redshirt) Jr.; Legend: (C) Team captain; (S) Suspended; (I) Ineligible; Injured; Redshirt; Coaching staff: Gus Malzahn – Head Coach; Tim Harris Jr. – Assistant Head coach/Co-Offensive Coordinator/Running backs; Travis Williams – Defensive coordinator; Chip Lindsey – Offensive coordinator/quarterbacks; Brian blackmon – Special teams coordinator/Tight Ends; David Gibbs – Co-Defensive coordinator/secondary; Addison Williams – Assistant to the Head coach/Cornerbacks; Herb Hand – Offensive line; Grant Heard – Wide receivers; Kenny Ingram – Defensive Ends/Rush; Kenny Martin – Defensive Tackles; Clayton Geathers – Defensive backs Asst. Coach; Andrew Blaylock – Special Assistant to Head Coach; Ben larson – Special Teams Analyst; DJ Mangas – Defensive Analyst; Charles moore – Defensive Analyst; Brendan bognar – Offensive Analyst; Alex Mathis – Recruiting/High School Relations; Deshaun Davis – graduate Asst. Coach; Jeremiah dinson – graduate Asst. Coach; Brandon Washington – graduate Asst. Coach; Chris dawson – Director of Sports Performance; Andrew shirek – Asst. Dir. of Sports Performance; Corey meredith – Asst. Dir. of Sports Performance; Sean Beckton Jr. – Asst. Dir. of Sports Performance; SJ Touhy – Dir. of FB Operations/Chief of Staff; → Roster updated November 30, 2022 → Depth chart updated November 30, 2022

=== Incoming transfers ===
Player	Position	Previous school
Terrence Lewis	LB	Maryland
K.D. McDaniel	DE	Kentucky
Koby Perry	S	Austin Peay
Tylan Grable	OT	Jacksonville State
Ryan Swoboda	OT	Virginia
John Rhys Plumlee	QB	Ole Miss
Kobe Hudson	WR	Auburn
Kemore Gamble	TE	Florida
Javon Baker	WR	Alabama
Lee Hunter	DL	Auburn
Jason Johnson	LB	Eastern Illinois
Branden Jennings	LB	Kansas State
Walter Yates III	LB	Savannah State
John Harris	OL	Virginia Tech
Cameron Kinnie	OL	Georgia
Demarkcus Bowman	RB	Florida
Timmy McClain	QB	South Florida

=== Departing transfers ===
Player	Position	Destination
Titus Mokiao-Atimalala	WR	UCLA
Tatum Bethune	LB	Florida State
Charlie Browder	TE	Tennessee
Zamari Maxwell	DB	Incarnate Word
Mike Lofton	OL	South Florida
Kaedin Robinson	WR	Appalachian State
Dillon Gabriel	QB	Oklahoma
Bentavious Thompson	RB	Oklahoma
Eriq Gilyard	LB	Kansas
Damarius Good	RB	Texas State
Cam Goode	DL	Michigan
Cole Joyce	LB	Utah State
Parker Navarro	QB	Ohio
Jaylon Robinson	WR	Ole Miss
Kadeem Leonard	LB	Campbell
Jermaine McMillan	DB	UMass
Devunte Dawson	DB	North Texas
Hirkley Latu	LB	Montana Western

=== Recruiting ===
College recruiting
Name	Hometown	School	Height	Weight	Commit date
Keahnist Thompson; DE	Lakeland, FL	Lakeland High School	6 ft 4 in (1.93 m)	235 lb (107 kg)	Jun 30, 2021
Keahnist Thompson; DE	Recruit ratings: Rivals: 247Sports: ESPN:				
Nikai Martinez; CB	Apopka, FL	Apopka High School	5 ft 10 in (1.78 m)	170 lb (77 kg)	Jul 9, 2021
Nikai Martinez; CB	Recruit ratings: Rivals: 247Sports: ESPN:				
Xavier Townsend; RB	Tampa, FL	Berkeley Prep	5 ft 10 in (1.78 m)	170 lb (77 kg)	Dec 15, 2021
Xavier Townsend; RB	Recruit ratings: Rivals: 247Sports: ESPN:				
Thomas Castellanos; ATH	Waycross, GA	Ware County High School	5 ft 10 in (1.78 m)	190 lb (86 kg)	Mar 15, 2021
Thomas Castellanos; ATH	Recruit ratings: Rivals: 247Sports: ESPN:				
Tyler Griffin; ATH	Brooklet, GA	Southeast Bulloch High School	6 ft 4 in (1.93 m)	205 lb (93 kg)	Jun 18, 2021
Tyler Griffin; ATH	Recruit ratings: Rivals: 247Sports: ESPN:				
Caden Kitler; OG	Plano, TX	John Paul II High School	6 ft 3 in (1.91 m)	285 lb (129 kg)	Jun 23, 2021
Caden Kitler; OG	Recruit ratings: Rivals: 247Sports: ESPN:				
Quan Lee; WR	Gainesville, FL	Buchholz High School	5 ft 11 in (1.80 m)	170 lb (77 kg)	Aug 31, 2021
Quan Lee; WR	Recruit ratings: Rivals: 247Sports: ESPN:				
Ja'Cari Henderson; CB	Sanford, FL	Seminole High School	6 ft 0 in (1.83 m)	160 lb (73 kg)	Oct 25, 2021
Ja'Cari Henderson; CB	Recruit ratings: Rivals: 247Sports: ESPN:				
Jamaal Johnson; DE	Miramar, FL	Chaminade-Madonna College Preparatory School	6 ft 1 in (1.85 m)	240 lb (110 kg)	Jun 18, 2021
Jamaal Johnson; DE	Recruit ratings: Rivals: 247Sports: ESPN:				
Demari Henderson; CB	Sanford, FL	Seminole High School	6 ft 0 in (1.83 m)	155 lb (70 kg)	Oct 25, 2021
Demari Henderson; CB	Recruit ratings: Rivals: 247Sports: ESPN:				
Jordan McDonald; ATH	Milton, GA	Milton High School	6 ft 1 in (1.85 m)	220 lb (100 kg)	Oct 23, 2021
Jordan McDonald; ATH	Recruit ratings: Rivals: 247Sports: ESPN:				
Kameron Moore; OLB	Sanford, FL	Seminole High School	6 ft 1 in (1.85 m)	205 lb (93 kg)	Aug 10, 2021
Kameron Moore; OLB	Recruit ratings: Rivals: 247Sports: ESPN:				
Miguel Maldonado; OG	Lakeland, FL	Lakeland High School	6 ft 5 in (1.96 m)	320 lb (150 kg)	Mar 7, 2021
Miguel Maldonado; OG	Recruit ratings: 247Sports: ESPN:				
T. J. Bullard; OLB	Tampa, FL	Berkeley Prep	6 ft 1 in (1.85 m)	190 lb (86 kg)	Jun 26, 2021
T. J. Bullard; OLB	Recruit ratings: Rivals: 247Sports: ESPN:				
Grant Stevens; TE-H	St. Augustine, FL	Nease High School	6 ft 3 in (1.91 m)	215 lb (98 kg)	Aug 22, 2021
Grant Stevens; TE-H	Recruit ratings: Rivals: 247Sports: ESPN:				
Overall recruit ranking: Rivals: 56 247Sports: 37
Note: In many cases, Scout, Rivals, 247Sports, On3, and ESPN may conflict in their listings of height and weight.; In these cases, the average was taken. ESPN grades are on a 100-point scale.; Sources: "2022 UCF Commitment List". Rivals.; "2022 Player Commits – UCF Knights". ESPN.; "2022 Team Ranking". Rivals.com.; "2022 UCF Knights football team". 247Sports.

== Awards and milestones ==
=== School records ===
- Most wins all-time in American Athletic Conference intra-conference games: 59 (AAC record, includes two wins in AAC Championship Game)
- Most rushing yards by a quarterback; Single game: 176, John Rhys Plumlee (at Tulane), November 14, 2022
- Most rushing yards by a quarterback; Season: 841, John Rhys Plumlee

=== American Athletic Conference honors ===
==== American Athletic Conference All-Conference First Team ====
- Ryan Swoboda, OT
- Lokahi Pauole, OG
- Ricky Barber, DL
- Tre'Mon Morris-Brash, DL
- Jason Johnson, LB

==== American Athletic Conference All-Conference Second Team ====
- Ryan O'Keefe, WR
- Samuel Jackson, OG
- Matt Lee, C
- Isaiah Bowser, RB

==== Offensive Player of the Week ====
- September 17: John Rhys Plumlee
- October 15: John Rhys Plumlee
- November 14: John Rhys Plumlee

==== Defensive Player of the Week ====
- October 29: Josh Celiscar

==== Honor Roll ====
- September 5: John Rhys Plumlee
- September 24: Jeremiah Jean-Baptiste
- October 8: John Rhys Plumlee
- October 29: R. J. Harvey
- November 5: R. J. Harvey
- November 26: John Rhys Plumlee

=== National awards and honors ===
- Davey O'Brien Award Great 8 List — John Rhys Plumlee (Week 3, Week 7)
- Manning Award Star of the Week — John Rhys Plumlee (Week 7)
- Patrick Mannelly Award finalist — Alex Ward
