= 2022 American Athletic Conference Football Championship Game =

- 8th AAC Championship Game
UCF Knights	Tulane Green Wave
(9–3)	(10–2)
28	45
Head coach: Gus Malzahn	Head coach: Willie Fritz
AP / Coaches / CFP; 22 / 23 / 22	AP / Coaches / CFP; 18 / 18 / 18
	1	2	3	4	Total
UCF	0	7	7	14	28
Tulane	10	7	7	21	45
- Date: December 3, 2022
- Season: 2022
- Stadium: Yulman Stadium
- Location: New Orleans, LA
- MVP: Michael Pratt, QB, Tulane
- Favorite: Tulane by 4
- Referee: Hank Johns
- Attendance: 30,118

United States TV coverage
- Network: ABC
- Announcers: Dave Pasch (play-by-play), Dusty Dvoracek (analyst) and Tom Luginbill (sideline reporter)

2022 American Athletic Conference football standings
	Conf.			Overall
Team	W		L	W		L
No. 9 Tulane y$	7	–	1	12	–	2
UCF y	6	–	2	9	–	5
Cincinnati	6	–	2	9	–	4
SMU	5	–	3	7	–	6
Houston	5	–	3	8	–	5
East Carolina	4	–	4	8	–	5
Navy	4	–	4	4	–	8
Memphis	3	–	5	7	–	6
Tulsa	3	–	5	5	–	7
Temple	1	–	7	3	–	9
South Florida	0	–	8	1	–	11
Championship: Tulane 45, UCF 28
$ – Conference champion; y – Championship game participant; Rankings from AP Poll

The 2022 American Athletic Conference Football Championship Game is a college football game played on December 3, 2022, at Yulman Stadium in New Orleans. It was the eighth American Athletic Conference Football Championship Game and determined the champion of the American Athletic Conference (AAC) for the 2022 season. The game began at 4:00 p.m. EST and aired on ABC. The game featured the regular season champions, the Tulane Green Wave, and the regular season runners-up, the UCF Knights. Sponsored by RoofClaim.com, a roofing services company, the game was officially known as the 2022 American Athletic Conference Football Championship Game presented by RoofClaim.com.

== Teams ==
Based on the current selection criteria, the game featured the two teams with the best winning percentage in AAC intra-conference play. The #1 seed team hosted the #2 seed team at its home stadium. The winner of the game was expected to receive an invitation to the Cotton Bowl, a NY6 bowl game, as the highest-ranked Group of Five conference champion. The loser received a berth to one of the games in the AAC's pool of bowls.

=== Tulane Green Wave ===
Tulane clinched a spot in the championship game following its defeat of Cincinnati on November 25. The win also ensured it would host the game. The Green Wave finished with a regular season record of 10–2 (7–1 in AAC), their best record since 1998. Running back Tyjae Spears was named AAC Offensive Player of the Year, and head coach Willie Fritz was named AAC Coach of the Year. This was Tulane's first appearance in the AAC Championship Game. It was seeking its first football conference championship since 1998, when it was part of C-USA. (Note: Conference USA did not play a championship game until 2005.) The Green Wave's season was highlighted by its first rankings since 1998, and first victory over a ranked team since 1984.

=== UCF Knights ===
UCF defeated two-time defending American Athletic Conference champions Cincinnati on October 29, then beat Tulane 38–31 on November 12. UCF was in position to host the conference championship until an upset 17–14 loss to Navy on November 19. Going into the final day of American Conference play (November 26), UCF, Cincinnati, and Houston were in contention to play Tulane in the game. UCF would clinch a spot in the championship game outright with a win over South Florida and a Houston loss to Tulsa. Cincinnati, which had lost to Tulane the previous night, needed a UCF loss and a Houston loss. In the case that both South Florida and Houston had won, the higher-ranked team in an average of major selector computer rankings (Anderson & Hester, Billingsley Report, Colley Matrix, Wolfe) between Cincinnati and Houston would have claimed the berth.

Ultimately, UCF secured its place in the title game with a 46–39 win at South Florida, coupled with a 37–30 Houston loss to Tulsa. The Knights finished the regular season with a record of 9–3 (6–2 in AAC). This was UCF's third appearance in the AAC Championship Game. It was seeking its fifth American Conference title after winning previously in 2013, 2014, 2017, and 2018 (The American held no championship game in 2013 and 2014). This was also UCF's final intra-conference game as a member of The American, as the Knights are set to join the Big 12 Conference in 2023.

== Game summary ==
The Tulane Green Wave overpowered the UCF Knights, putting up 648 total yards of offense. Big plays on offense gassed the UCF defense, and despite a late Knights rally, Tulane seemingly had an answer for every score. They pulled away for a 45–28 victory, their first AAC conference championship.

=== First quarter ===
Tulane took a 10–0 lead in the first quarter. Quarterback Michael Pratt and running back Tyjae Spears put up big numbers, respectively. Pratt found Shae Wyatt for a 10-yard touchdown, then connected with Duece Watts for a 54-yard gain. The latter set up a field goal by Valentino Ambrosio. Meanwhile, quarterback John Rhys Plumlee started for UCF and aggravated a hamstring injury. He left the game and third-string quarterback Thomas Castellanos began taking most of the snaps. Back-up quarterback Mikey Keene elected not to dress for the game, in order to preserve his redshirt.

=== Second quarter ===
UCF was driving into Tulane territory to start the second quarter. On 4th & 1 at the Tulane 23, the Knights turned the ball over on downs. They held Tulane to a three-and-out, at which time they elected to go for it themselves on a 4th & 1. The Knights defense stuffed Tulane for no gain, and shockingly got the ball right back. Xavier Townsend's 5-yard jet sweep touchdown run made the score 10–7. Tulane, answered, going 75 yards in four plays. Lawrence Keys III burned the defense on a 43-yard catch and run touchdown, and made the score 17–7 with 5 minutes left. Thomas Castellanos was unable to spark much on offense, going three-and-out two times. With 18 seconds left in the half, Pratt was hit as he threw, and put up a wobbly pass which was intercepted by Davonte Brown, snuffing out a Tulane scoring opportunity. The Green Wave held a 17–7 lead going into halftime.

=== Third quarter ===
Tulane got the ball to start the second half. UCF had them in a 3rd & 8 at their own 26, but Alex Bauman converted on third down. Two plays later, Tyjae Spears knifed his way through the defense, all the way for a 60-yard touchdown run. On their next drive, Spears again blasted for a huge gain, this time a 56-yard run down to the UCF 26. The drive came up empty, however, as UCF forced a fumble at the 3 yard line. Trailing 24–7, Plumlee came back in the game for UCF late in the third quarter. He swiftly drove the Knights 80 yards in 8 plays. A 17-yard touchdown throw to Kobe Hudson cut the deficit to 24–14.

=== Fourth quarter ===
UCF, trailing by 10, punted to Tulane at the start of the fourth quarter. Michael Pratt found Duece Watts up the middle on a busted coverage. In one play, Tulane went 73 yards for a touchdown, and was back up by 17. The Knights were not ready to give up yet. With Plumlee back in the game, UCF faced a 3rd & 1 just past midfield. Plumlee took a shotgun snap, then lateralled to R.J. Harvey, who threw deep down field to a wide-open Hudson. The 49-yard touchdown put the Knights back in the game. Two plays later, Tulane fumbled away the ball at their own 30. Jason Johnson ripped the ball away from Tyjae Spears. Isaiah Bowser's powering 10-yard touchdown run made the score 31–28 with 9:48 to go.

The Knights got within 3 points, and seemingly had momentum, but Tulane continued to gas the UCF defense. The Green Wave answered with two more touchdowns on big plays, and put the game out reach. Tulane won their first AAC championship by the score of 45–28.

2022 American Athletic Conference Football Championship Game

Quarter	1	2	3	4	Total
No. 22 UCF	0	7	7	14	28
No. 18 Tulane	10	7	7	21	45

at Yulman Stadium • New Orleans, LA

- Date: December 3, 2022
- Game time: 3:00 p.m. CST
- Game weather: 67 °F (19 °C) • Light rain/mist • Wind: 8 mph (13 km/h) west
- Game attendance: 30,118
- Referee: Hank Johns
- TV announcers (ABC): Dave Pasch (play-by-play), Dusty Dvoracek (analyst) and Tom Luginbill (sideline reporter)

Game information

1st quarter

- (7:46) TULN – Shae Wyatt 10 yard pass from Michael Pratt, Valentino Ambrosio kick (Drive: 9 plays, 85 yards, 4:12; Tulane 7–0)
- (1:01) TULN – Valentino Ambrosio 27 yard field goal (Drive: 9 plays, 68 yards, 3:19; Tulane 10–0)

2nd quarter

- (6:48) UCF – Xavier Townsend 5 yard rush, Colton Boomer kick (Drive: 8 plays, 32 yards, 3:27; Tulane 10–7)
- (5:00) TULN – Lawrence Keys III 43 yard pass from Michael Pratt, Valentino Ambrosio kick (Drive: 4 plays, 75 yards, 1:48; Tulane 17–7)

3rd quarter

- (12:09) TULN – Tyjae Spears 60 yard rush, Valentino Ambrosio kick (Drive: 5 plays, 76 yards, 2:51; Tulane 24–7)
- (1:53) UCF – Kobe Hudson 17 yard pass from John Rhys Plumlee, Colton Boomer kick (Drive: 8 plays, 80 yards, 2:22; Tulane 24–14)

4th quarter

- (14:29) TULN – Duece Watts 73 yard pass from Michael Pratt, Valentino Ambrosio kick (Drive: 1 play, 73 yards, 0:11; Tulane 31–14)
- (12:26) UCF – Kobe Hudson 49 yard pass from RJ Harvey, Colton Boomer kick (Drive: 6 plays, 75 yards, 2:03; Tulane 31–21)
- (9:48) UCF – Isaiah Bowser 10 yard rush, Colton Boomer kick (Drive: 4 plays, 30 yards, 1:52; Tulane 31–28)
- (8:18) TULN – Shae Wyatt 60 yard pass from Michael Pratt, Valentino Ambrosio kick (Drive: 4 plays, 75 yards, 1:30; Tulane 38–28)
- (4:04) TULN – Michael Pratt 18 yard rush, Valentino Ambrosio kick (Drive: 4 plays, 46 yards, 1:38; Tulane 45–28)

=== Statistics ===
Statistics	UCF	Tulane
First downs	23	20
Plays–yards	96–410	64–648
Rushes–yards	48–145	31–254
Passing yards	265	394
Passing: comp–att–int	24–48–0	20–33–1
Time of possession	34:21	25:39

Team	Category	Player	Statistics
UCF	Passing	John Rhys Plumlee	21/39, 209 yards, 1 TD
UCF	Rushing	Isaiah Bowser	20 carries, 85 yards, 1 TD
UCF	Receiving	Kobe Hudson	4 receptions, 98 yards, 2 TDs
Tulane	Passing	Michael Pratt	20/33, 394 yards, 4 TDs, 1 INT
Tulane	Rushing	Tyjae Spears	22 carries, 199 yards, 1 TD
Tulane	Receiving	Duece Watts	3 receptions, 134 yards, 1 TD
