= Divaad Wilson =

American football player (born 2000)

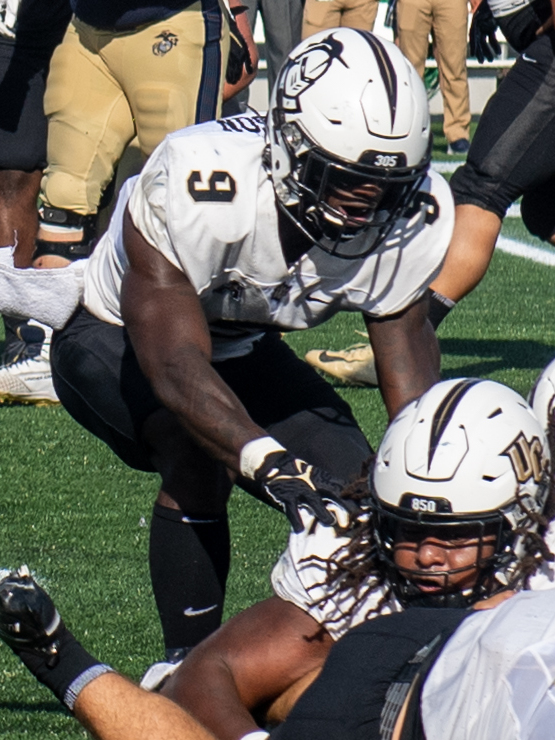
- Wilson with UCF in 2021

Profile
- Position: Cornerback

Personal information
- Born: January 26, 2000 (age 26); Miami, Florida, U.S.
- Listed height: 6 ft 0 in (1.83 m)
- Listed weight: 195 lb (88 kg)

Career information
- High school: Miami Northwestern
- College: Georgia (2018–2019); UCF (2020–2022)
- NFL draft: 2023: undrafted

Career history
- Jacksonville Jaguars (2023)*; Arizona Cardinals (2023–2024); New York Giants (2024); Detroit Lions (2025)*
- * Offseason or practice squad member only

Awards and highlights
- Second-team All-AAC (2021)

Career NFL statistics as of 2024
- Total tackles: 10
- Pass deflections: 1
- Stats at Pro Football Reference

Divaad "Newt" Wilson (born January 26, 2000) is an American professional football cornerback. He played college football for the UCF Knights and Georgia Bulldogs. He signed with the Jacksonville Jaguars as an undrafted free agent in 2023.

== Early years ==
Wilson competed in football and track and field at Miami Northwestern High School. Wilson was a four-star prospect at 247Sports. Ranked as the #26 defensive back nationally, the #242 overall prospect nationally, and the #46 prospect in Florida. He was an ESPN four-star prospect, ranked #205 nationally, and the #26 cornerback.

== College career ==
=== Georgia ===
Wilson played for Georgia as a redshirt freshman, he saw action in 13 games and started vs. Notre Dame and Kentucky.

=== UCF ===
Wilson's sophomore year, he played on special teams and on defense had 11 total tackles, nine solo tackles, and one pass deflection.

In Wilson's junior year, he appeared in all 13 regular season games, starting 12 times at Safety. Earning third-team All-American Athletic Conference (AAC) accolades from Pro Football Focus, he led the team in interceptions on the season. fourth on the team with 72 tackles and 41 solo tackles.

In 2022, Wilson switched around as a versatile nickleback and led the Knights in interceptions with three. Wilson also had several reps at punt returner. Named a second-team All-AAC pick by Pro Football Network and a third-team All-AAC by Phil Steele and was on the 2022 watch list for the Bronko Nagurski Trophy.

== Professional career ==
Pre-draft measurables
Height	Weight	Arm length	Hand span	40-yard dash	10-yard split	20-yard split	20-yard shuttle	Three-cone drill	Vertical jump	Broad jump
5 ft 11 3/4 in (1.82 m)	190 lb (86 kg)	30 3/8 in (0.77 m)	8 3/4 in (0.22 m)	4.46 s	1.59 s	2.57 s	4.48 s	7.25 s	32.5 in (0.83 m)	10 ft 6 in (3.20 m)
All values from Pro Day

=== Jacksonville Jaguars ===
Wilson signed with the Jacksonville Jaguars on May 1, 2023. On August 29, 2023, Wilson was released.

=== Arizona Cardinals ===
Wilson signed to the practice squad of the Arizona Cardinals on September 4, 2023.

In Week 12, November 26, 2023, Wilson was elevated to the active roster for the Los Angeles Rams game. He made his first NFL debut and recorded one solo tackle in the game. He was signed to the active roster on January 5, 2024.

Wilson was waived by the Cardinals on August 27, 2024, and re-signed to the practice squad.

=== New York Giants ===
On December 11, 2024, Wilson was signed by the New York Giants off the Cardinals practice squad.

=== Detroit Lions ===
On June 2, 2025, Wilson signed with the Detroit Lions. On June 4, he was waived with an injury designation. On June 5, he was reverted to injured reserve after he cleared waivers. On July 16, Wilson was waived with an injury settlement.
