= Ryan Swoboda =

American football player (born 1998)

Profile
- Position: Offensive tackle

Personal information
- Born: September 19, 1998 (age 28); Portland, Oregon, U.S.
- Listed height: 6 ft 9 in (2.06 m)
- Listed weight: 325 lb (147 kg)

Career information
- High school: Windermere Prep (Lake Butler, Orange County, Florida)
- College: Virginia (2017–2021); UCF (2022)
- NFL draft: 2023: undrafted

Career history
- Detroit Lions (2023)*; New York Jets (2023)*; Atlanta Falcons (2023)*
- * Offseason or practice squad member only

Awards and highlights
- First team All-AAC (2022)
- Stats at Pro Football Reference

Ryan Swoboda (born September 19, 1998) is an American former football offensive tackle. He played college football at Virginia and UCF.

== Early life and education ==
Swoboda committed to play college football for the Virginia Cavaliers after attending Windermere Preparatory School. He was a member of the Cavaliers football team from 2017 until transferring to UCF in 2022. He played in the NFLPA Collegiate Bowl following the 2022 season.

== Professional career ==
Pre-draft measurables
| Height | Weight | Arm length | Hand span | 40-yard dash | 10-yard split | 20-yard split | 20-yard shuttle | Three-cone drill | Vertical jump | Broad jump | Bench press |
|---|---|---|---|---|---|---|---|---|---|---|---|
| 6 ft 9 1/2 in (2.07 m) | 309 lb (140 kg) | 34 5/8 in (0.88 m) | 9 7/8 in (0.25 m) | 5.29 s | 1.72 s | 3.01 s | 4.69 s | 7.64 s | 29.0 in (0.74 m) | 9 ft 4 in (2.84 m) | 30 reps |
All values from Pro Day

=== Detroit Lions ===
On May 12, 2023, the Detroit Lions signed Swoboda to a three-year, $2.705 million contract as an undrafted free agent. He was waived on August 29, 2023.

=== New York Jets ===
On August 31, 2023, Swoboda was signed to the practice squad of the New York Jets. He was released on September 21.

=== Atlanta Falcons ===
On December 27, 2023, Swoboda was signed to the Atlanta Falcons practice squad. Following the end of the 2023 regular season, he signed a reserve/future contract on January 10, 2024. He was waived with a non-football injury designation on May 7, 2024.
