= John Rhys Plumlee =

American football and baseball player (born 2001)

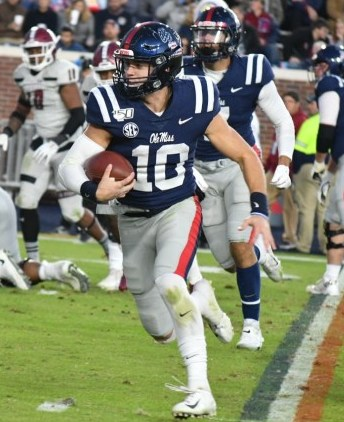
- Plumlee with the Ole Miss Rebels in 2019

Dallas Renegades
- Positions: Quarterback, Wide receiver
- Roster status: Active

Personal information
- Born: January 2, 2001 (age 25); Hattiesburg, Mississippi, U.S.
- Listed height: 6 ft 0 in (1.83 m)
- Listed weight: 200 lb (91 kg)

Career information
- High school: Oak Grove (Hattiesburg)
- College: Ole Miss (2019–2021); UCF (2022–2023)
- NFL draft: 2024: undrafted

Career history
- Pittsburgh Steelers (2024)*; Jacksonville Jaguars (2024)*; Seattle Seahawks (2024); Pittsburgh Steelers (2025)*; Houston Gamblers (2026); Dallas Renegades (2027–present)
- * Offseason or practice squad member only
- Stats at Pro Football Reference

John Rhys Plumlee (born January 2, 2001) is an American professional quarterback and wide receiver for the Dallas Renegades of the United Football League (UFL). He played college football for the Ole Miss Rebels and UCF Knights as well as playing center fielder for both of their college baseball teams.

== Early life ==
John Rhys (pronounced "Rice") Plumlee was born to Denton and Lori Plumlee on January 2, 2001, in Hattiesburg, Mississippi, where he grew up and attended Oak Grove High School, and he played both baseball and football. His older sister, Rhyan, and younger sister, Reese, were both standouts on the Oak Grove High School volleyball team. He became the Warriors' starting quarterback as a sophomore. As a junior, he passed for 1,759 yards, 14 touchdowns and nine interceptions and rushed for 599 yards and eight touchdowns in nine games and was named to the "Dandy Dozen" by The Clarion-Ledger. In baseball, he batted .442 with 35 RBIs and 38 runs scored in 27 games. Rated a four star recruit, Plumlee initially committed to play college football at Georgia during the summer. By the end of his senior year, he had 16 offers from the likes of Alabama, Auburn, Florida, Florida State, Miami, Nebraska, and Notre Dame.

As a senior, Plumlee completed 187-of-291 passes (64.3 percent) for 2,834 yards with 33 touchdown passes and three interceptions while also rushing for 1,444 yards and 19 touchdowns on 162 carries (8.9 yards per carry) and led the team to a Southern State championship before losing to Horn Lake High School. He finished his high school career with 5,430 passing yards, 2,314 rushing yards and 82 total touchdowns in three seasons. After the season, Plumlee de-committed from Georgia shortly before National Signing Day in order to accept as scholarship to play both football and baseball at Ole Miss. Plumlee batted .411 with 39 hits, 45 runs scored, seven doubles, five triples, two home runs and 24 RBI in 29 games and was named 2019 5A/6A All-State in his final baseball season at Oak Grove.

== College career ==
=== College football ===
==== Ole Miss ====
Plumlee began his true freshman season in 2019 as the Rebels' backup quarterback. He made his collegiate debut against the California Golden Bears after an injury to starter Matt Corral, completing all seven of his passes for 82 yards and rushing three times for 53 yards as he led the team to a near-comeback win before being stopped at California's one-yard line as time expired. Plumlee made his first career start the following week on September 28, 2019, against the Alabama Crimson Tide, completing 35.7 percent of his passes for 141 yards with two touchdowns and one interception and also rushing 109 yards and one touchdown in a 59–31 loss. He was named the Southeastern Conference (SEC) Freshman of the Week after rushing for 165 yards and a touchdown with 99 passing yards against the Vanderbilt Commodores on October 5. On November 10 against the New Mexico State Aggies, Plumlee broke the freshman rushing yards and rushing touchdown record with 177 yards on the ground and two touchdowns. Plumlee finished the season with 910 yards, four touchdowns and three interceptions on 79-for-150 passing (52.7 percent) while rushing 154 times for 1,023 yards and 12 touchdowns. He set Ole Miss records for rushing yards, rushing touchdowns and total touchdowns by a freshman and the most rushing yards in a season by a quarterback.

Going into his sophomore season, Corral was named the Rebels' starting quarterback over Plumlee. Plumlee continued to be used in package plays while also serving as the backup quarterback. He also occasionally lined up at wide receiver and saw significant time at the position in the Rebels' 26–20 win over the Indiana Hoosiers in the 2021 Outback Bowl, catching five passes for 73 yards. Plumlee finished the season with 65 passing yards with one touchdown pass, 94 rushing yards, and six receptions for 79 yards in six games. In baseball, he batted .267 with four doubles, one home run, seven stolen bases, 21 runs scored, and seven RBIs.

Plumlee entered his junior season listed as a wide receiver. He finished the season with 19 receptions for 201 yards and 72 rushing yards on nine carries. Plumlee announced that he would be entering the transfer portal following Ole Miss's appearance in the 2022 Sugar Bowl.

==== UCF ====
Plumlee announced his commitment to transfer to UCF on January 9, 2022, and was named the Knights starting quarterback going into the 2022 season. He tied a school record with seven total touchdowns after he completed 18 of 22 pass attempts for 373 yards and four touchdowns and rushed seven times for 37 yards and three touchdowns in a 70–13 win over the Temple Owls on October 13, 2022. Plumlee finished the season with 218 completions on 346 pass attempts for 2,586 yards with 14 touchdowns and eight interceptions while also rushing for 862 yards and 11 touchdowns. He was named AAC offensive player of the week (3 times) and 2nd-team All-AAC by Phil Steele.

=== College baseball ===
Plumlee began his freshman baseball season as the Rebels' starting centerfielder, while playing in the same outfield as football teammate Jerrion Ealy. He had one hit in 16 at-bats before the season was cut short due to the coronavirus pandemic. He later committed to play for the UCF Knights baseball team, but his waiver to play in the 2022 season was denied by the NCAA.

Plumlee entered the 2023 season as a starting outfielder. Plumlee went viral on April 14 for participating in a baseball game as well as a football game on the same day. He was caught leaving to change into a different uniform mid-game to play in the spring football game. The 12–3 baseball victory over the Memphis Tigers, he went 2-for-3 with a triple, and two RBI. At the football game, he threw for 230 yards and two touchdowns, including a 70-yarder. Plumlee finished the season, batting .286 with 11 doubles, one triple, 10 home runs, 43 runs scored, 32 RBI, and led the team in stolen bases with 18.

== Professional career ==
Pre-draft measurables
Height	Weight	Arm length	Hand span	Wingspan	40-yard dash	10-yard split	20-yard split	20-yard shuttle	Three-cone drill	Vertical jump	Broad jump
5 ft 11 3/4 in (1.82 m)	203 lb (92 kg)	30 3/8 in (0.77 m)	8 7/8 in (0.23 m)	6 ft 2 1/4 in (1.89 m)	4.54 s	1.63 s	2.62 s	4.27 s	6.96 s	36.5 in (0.93 m)	10 ft 4 in (3.15 m)
All values from Pro Day

=== Pittsburgh Steelers ===
Plumlee signed with the Pittsburgh Steelers as an undrafted free agent on April 27, 2024.

He was selected by the Arlington Renegades with the third overall selection in the 2024 UFL draft on July 17.

He was waived on August 27, 2024.

=== Jacksonville Jaguars ===
On August 30, 2024, Plumlee was signed to the Jacksonville Jaguars' practice squad. He was released on November 12.

=== Seattle Seahawks ===
On November 20, 2024, Plumlee signed with the Seattle Seahawks practice squad. On January 2, 2025, Plumlee was signed to Seattle's active roster as a wide receiver.

On August 26, 2025, Plumlee was waived by the Seahawks with an injury designation as part of final roster cuts.

=== Pittsburgh Steelers (second stint) ===
On October 29, 2025, the Pittsburgh Steelers signed Plumlee to their practice squad. He was waived on November 4. Plumlee was re-signed to the practice squad on November 18.

On January 14, 2026, Plumlee signed a reserve/futures contract with Pittsburgh. On April 28, Plumlee was released by the Steelers.

=== Houston Gamblers ===
On May 2, 2026, Plumlee was signed by the Houston Gamblers of the United Football League (UFL).

== Career statistics ==
=== UFL ===
Year	Team	Games			Passing									Rushing				
Year	Team	GP	GS	Record	Cmp	Att	Pct	Yds	Y/A	Lng	TD	Int	Rtg	Att	Yds	Avg	Lng	TD
2026	HOU	4	1	1–0	25	50	50.0	296	5.9	49	1	2	58.4	15	118	7.9	20	1
Career		4	1	1–0	25	50	50.0	296	5.9	49	1	2	58.4	15	118	7.9	20	1

=== College football ===
Season	Team	Games			Passing								Rushing				Receiving			
Season	Team	GP	GS	Record (Note: Accounts for only GS as a QB. On 9/26/20 and 11/6/21 Rhys Plumlee started at WR.)	Cmp	Att	Pct	Yds	Y/A	TD	Int	Rtg	Att	Yds	Avg	TD	Rec	Yds	Avg	TD
2019	Ole Miss	9	8	2–6	79	150	52.7	910	6.1	4	3	108.4	154	1,023	6.6	12	0	0	0	0
2020	Ole Miss	7	1	—	5	7	71.4	65	9.3	1	0	196.6	25	94	3.8	0	6	79	13.2	0
2021	Ole Miss	13	1	—	1	1	100.0	6	6.0	0	0	150.4	9	72	8.0	0	19	201	10.6	0
2022	UCF	13	13	8–5	218	346	63.0	2,586	7.5	14	8	134.5	159	862	5.4	11	1	16	16.0	0
2023	UCF	10	10	5–5	161	256	62.9	2,271	8.9	15	8	150.5	106	505	4.8	5	0	0	0.0	0
Career		52	33	15–16	464	760	61.1	5,838	7.7	34	19	135.3	453	2,556	5.6	28	26	296	11.4	0

=== College baseball ===
Season	Team	G	PA	AB	R	H	2B	3B	HR	RBI	SB	CS	BB	SO	BA
2020	Ole Miss	13	18	16	4	1	0	0	0	1	1	0	0	11	.063
2021	Ole Miss	47	77	60	21	16	4	0	1	7	7	2	14	27	.267
2022	UCF	Did not play due to NCAA transfer rules													
2023	UCF	58	237	196	43	56	11	1	10	32	18	5	17	59	.286
Career		118	332	272	68	73	15	1	11	40	26	7	31	97	.268
