= 2022 Tulane Green Wave football team =

American college football season

2022 Tulane Green Wave football

AAC champion Cotton Bowl Classic champion

AAC Championship Game, W 45–28 vs. UCF

Cotton Bowl Classic, W 46–45 vs. USC
- Conference: American Athletic Conference

Ranking
- Coaches: No. 9
- AP: No. 9
- Record: 12–2 (7–1 AAC)
- Head coach: Willie Fritz (7th season)
- Offensive coordinator: Jim Svoboda (1st season)
- Offensive scheme: Spread
- Defensive coordinator: Chris Hampton (2nd season)
- Base defense: 4–2–5
- Home stadium: Yulman Stadium

2022 American Athletic Conference football standings
	Conf.			Overall
Team	W		L	W		L
No. 9 Tulane y$	7	–	1	12	–	2
UCF y	6	–	2	9	–	5
Cincinnati	6	–	2	9	–	4
SMU	5	–	3	7	–	6
Houston	5	–	3	8	–	5
East Carolina	4	–	4	8	–	5
Navy	4	–	4	4	–	8
Memphis	3	–	5	7	–	6
Tulsa	3	–	5	5	–	7
Temple	1	–	7	3	–	9
South Florida	0	–	8	1	–	11
Championship: Tulane 45, UCF 28
$ – Conference champion; y – Championship game participant; Rankings from AP Poll

The 2022 Tulane Green Wave football team represented Tulane University in the 2022 NCAA Division I FBS football season. The Green Wave played their home games at Yulman Stadium in New Orleans, Louisiana, and competed in the American Athletic Conference (The American). They were led by seventh-year head coach Willie Fritz. They finished the season 12–2, 7–1 in AAC play to earn a trip to the AAC championship game. The Green Wave defeated UCF to win the AAC championship, the school's first conference championship since 1998 and its first AAC championship. They received a bid to the Cotton Bowl Classic to play No-10 ranked USC. It was their first major bowl game since the 1940 Sugar Bowl. Tulane defeated USC in the Cotton Bowl 46–45, scoring 16 points in the final four minutes to win the game. In the game, with 4:30 remaining and the team facing a 15-point deficit, Tulane's win probability stood at 0.2%, yet the Green Wave pulled off the improbable comeback.

Following a 45–31 win against South Florida, Tulane was ranked in the AP Poll for the first time since 1998. It was also the fastest Tulane has ever clinched bowl eligibility in school history at October 15. November 12's home game against UCF was the first Tulane home game between two ranked opponents since 1949. For the first time since 1984, Tulane beat an opponent ranked in the AP top 25, although Tulane did beat Army in 2019 when they were ranked No. 25 in the Coaches Poll. The ten-win turnaround from two wins in 2021 to twelve in 2022 is the best in NCAA history. The Green Wave were ranked 9th in the final AP Poll, the highest ranking of the Green Wave since 1998.

== Award watch lists ==
Listed in the order that they were released

Award	Player	Position	Year
Maxwell Award	Michael Pratt	QB	JR
Doak Walker Award	Tyjae Spears	RB	JR
John Mackey Award	Tyrick James	TE	SR
Rimington Award	Sincere Haynesworth	OL	SR
Outland Trophy	Sincere Haynesworth	OL	SR
Paul Hornung Award	Jha'Quan Jackson	WR	JR
Wuerffel Trophy	Nick Anderson	LB	SR

== Schedule ==
Tulane and The American announced the 2022 football schedule on February 17, 2022.

Date	Time	Opponent	Rank	Site	TV	Result	Attendance
September 3	6:00 p.m.	UMass*		Yulman Stadium; New Orleans, LA	ESPN+	W 42–10	15,101
September 10	6:00 p.m.	Alcorn State*		Yulman Stadium; New Orleans, LA	ESPN+	W 52–0	14,501
September 17	2:00 p.m.	at Kansas State*		Bill Snyder Family Football Stadium; Manhattan, KS	ESPN+	W 17–10	50,887
September 24	6:00 p.m.	Southern Miss*		Yulman Stadium; New Orleans, LA (Battle for the Bell)	ESPN+	L 24–27	20,422
September 30	6:00 p.m.	at Houston		TDECU Stadium; Houston, TX	ESPN	W 27–24 ^{OT}	24,319
October 8	2:30 p.m.	East Carolina		Yulman Stadium; New Orleans, LA	ESPNU	W 24–9	14,193
October 15	3:00 p.m.	at South Florida		Raymond James Stadium; Tampa, FL	ESPNU	W 45–31	31,053
October 22	2:30 p.m.	Memphis^{†}	No. 25	Yulman Stadium; New Orleans, LA	ESPN2	W 38–28	30,100
November 5	11:00 a.m.	at Tulsa	No. 19	H.A. Chapman Stadium; Tulsa, OK	ESPNU	W 27–13	15,122
November 12	2:30 p.m.	No. 22 UCF	No. 17	Yulman Stadium; New Orleans, LA	ESPN2	L 31–38	27,317
November 17	6:30 p.m.	SMU	No. 21	Yulman Stadium; New Orleans, LA	ESPN	W 59–24	20,894
November 25	11:00 a.m.	at No. 24 Cincinnati	No. 19	Nippert Stadium; Cincinnati, OH	ABC	W 27–24	37,989
December 3	4:00 p.m	No. 22 UCF	No. 18	Yulman Stadium; New Orleans, LA (AAC Championship Game)	ABC	W 45–28	30,118
January 2, 2023	12:00 p.m	vs. No. 10 USC*	No. 16	AT&T Stadium; Arlington, TX (Cotton Bowl Classic)	ESPN	W 46–45	55,329
*Non-conference game; ^{†}Homecoming; Rankings from AP Poll (and CFP Rankings, after November 1) - Released prior to game; All times are in Central time

== Roster ==
2022 Tulane Green Wave football team roster
Players
Coaches
Offense

Pos.	#	Name	Class
RB	0	Shaadie Clayton-Johnson	Fr
WR	2	Duece Watts	Sr
WR	3	Phat Watts	Sr
WR	4	Jha'Quan Jackson	Jr
WR	6	Lawrence Keys III	Jr
QB	7	Michael Pratt	Jr
RB	8	Iverson Celestine	Fr
QB	9	Carson Haggard	Fr
WR	10	Shae Wyatt	Sr
QB	12	Kai Horton	Fr
QB	13	Justin Ibieta	Fr
RB	16	Levi Williams	So
WR	17	Chris Brazzell II	Fr
QB	19	Garrett Mmahat	Fr
RB	20	Cameron Carroll	Sr
RB	21	Makhi Hughes	Fr
RB	22	Tyjae Spears	Jr
WR	24	Lucas Desjardins	Fr
RB	38	Josh Coltrin	So
WR	39	Trevor Evans	Fr
RB	40	George Arata	Fr
WR	41	Michael Lavergne	Fr
RB	42	Lucas Barisas	Fr
RB	44	Charles Schibler	Fr
RB	46	Tate Jernigan	So
TE	48	Jonathan Kahn	Fr
OL	52	Sincere Haynesworth	Sr
OL	54	Kanan Ray	Jr
OL	56	Shadre Hurst	Fr
OL	58	Caleb Thomas	So
OL	60	Ethan Marcus	Fr
OL	61	Hutson Lillibridge	Fr
OL	65	Sully Burns	Fr
OL	66	Nik Hogan	Jr
OL	68	Josh Remetich	So
OL	69	Rashad Green	So
OL	71	Matt Lombardi	Fr
OL	72	Trey Tuggle	Fr
OL	74	Jackson Fort	So
OL	75	Joseph Solomon	Fr
OL	76	Prince Pines	Jr
OL	77	Keanon McNally	Fr
OL	79	Joey Claybrook	Sr
TE	80	Tyrick James	Sr
WR	81	Luke Besh	Fr
WR	82	Reed Rutkowski	Fr
WR	83	Bryce Bohanon	Fr
TE	84	Will Wallace	Sr
WR	85	Jalen Rogers	Fr
TE	86	Andrew Wilks	Fr
TE	87	Alex Bauman	Fr
TE	88	Blake Gunter	Fr
TE	89	Reggie Brown	So

Defense

Pos.	#	Name	Class
DL	0	Patrick Jenkins	So
LB	1	Nick Anderson	Sr
LB	2	Dorian Williams	Sr
DL	3	Angelo Anderson	So
DL	6	Darius Hodges	So
DB	7	Lance Robinson	Jr
DL	8	Carlos Hatcher	So
DB	11	Jarius Monroe	Jr
DB	12	D. J. Douglas	So
DB	13	Cadien Robinson	Fr
DB	15	T. J. Huggins	Fr
DB	19	Kiland Harrison	So
DL	20	Matthew Remondet	Fr
DB	22	Gabe Liu	Fr
S	23	Lummie Young IV	Sr
DB	24	Tyrek Presley	So
DB	25	Rayshawn Pleasant	Fr
S	26	Shi'Keem Laister	So
LB	27	Austin Sybrandt	Fr
DB	28	Jadon Canady	So
S	29	Allen Stewart	Fr
DB	29	Kentrell Webb	Fr
S	30	Jonathan Mestayer II	So
S	31	Larry Brooks	Sr
S	32	Bailey Despanie	Fr
DB	33	Rodrek Williams	Fr
S	34	Jean-Jacques Hunter	Fr
LB	35	Jesus Machado	So
LB	36	Mandel Eugene Jr.	Fr
S	37	Macon Clark	Sr
DB	39	Brandon Kim	Fr
LB	40	Taylor Love	Fr
DB	43	Rishi Rattan	So
DL	44	Michael Lunz	Fr
LB	45	Corey Platt Jr.	Fr
DB	46	Chadwick Bailey	Fr
LB	47	Aidan McCahill	Fr
DL	48	Keith Cooper Jr.	So
DL	49	Armoni Dixon	So
DL	51	James Laprocido	Fr
LB	52	Adam Uppuluri	Fr
DL	53	Isaiah Boyd	Fr
DL	55	Noah Taliancich	So
LB	59	Jack Collins	Fr
DL	70	Kameron Hamilton	Fr
DL	90	Devean Deal	Fr
DL	91	Tylo Phillips	Sr
DL	92	Gerrod Henderson	Fr
DL	93	Elijah Champaigne	Fr
DL	94	Eric Hicks Jr.	So
DL	95	Adonis Friloux	So
DL	97	Maxie Baudoin IV	Fr
DL	98	Parker Petersen	Fr
DL	99	Alfred Thomas	Sr

Special teams

Pos.	#	Name	Class
K	41	Kriston Esnard	Fr
K	43	Valentino Ambrosio	Jr
LS	50	Jackson Schmelter	Fr
K/P	53	Bobby Noel	Fr
LS	57	Ethan Hudak	So
P	62	Brice Busch	Fr
K	67	Graham Dable	So
K	81	Lucas Dunker Jr.	So
P	92	Ethan Greenberg	Fr
P	96	Casey Glover	Jr

Head coach

- Willie Fritz

Coordinators/assistant coaches

- Jim Svoboda – Offensive coordinator
- Chris Hampton – Defensive coordinator
- Robby Discher – Special teams coordinator
- Slade Nagle – Tight ends
- Michael Mutz – Linebackers
- Joshua Christian-Young – Defensive backs
- John McMenamin – Wide receivers
- Derrick Sherman – Running backs
- Travian Robertson – Defensive line
- Eman Naghavi – Offensive line
- Kurt Hester – Director, strength and conditioning
- Benjamin Moortgat – Assistant, strength and conditioning
- Shane Meyer – Director, football operations
- Wes Fritz – Director, player personnel
- Favian Upshaw – Offensive analyst
- J. J. McCleskey – Defensive analyst
- Marianna Salas – Defensive analyst/recruiting
- Jake Stone – Defensive analyst/recruiting
- Taylor Spotts-Orgeron – Offensive assistant
- Robert Beachem – Graduate assistant
- Jamar Mitchell – Graduate assistant
- Timothy Kennedy – Graduate assistant
- Mark Wright – Graduate assistant
- Dane Zeigler – Graduate assistant

Legend

- (C) Team captain
- (S) Suspended
- (I) Ineligible
- Injured
- Redshirt

Roster
Last update: 1/2/23

== Game summaries ==
=== vs UMass ===
UMass Minutemen (0–0) vs Tulane Green Wave (0–0) – Game summary

Quarter	1	2	3	4	Total
Minutemen	0	10	0	0	10
Green Wave	7	14	21	0	42

at Yulman Stadium • New Orleans, LA

- Date: September 3, 2022
- Game time: 6:00 p.m.
- Game weather: Rainy, 81 °F (27 °C)
- Game attendance: 15,101
- Referee: Tim Rich
- TV announcers (ESPN+): Jack Benjamin (play-by-play) and Brian Kinchen (analyst)

Game information

First quarter

- (8:37) TUL – Tyjae Spears 6-yard run, Kriston Esnard kick (Drive: 6 plays, 36 yards, 2:53; Tulane 7–0)

Second quarter

- (14:56) UMASS – Gino Campiotti 4-yard run, Cameron Carson kick (Drive: 12 plays, 49 yards, 5:45; Tied 7–7)
- (8:31) TUL – Tyjae Spears 1-yard run, Kriston Esnard kick (Drive: 13 plays, 77 yards, 6:25; Tulane 14–7)
- (9:30) TUL – Tyjae Spears 4-yard run, Kriston Esnard kick (Drive: 3 plays, 36 yards, 1:03; Tulane 21–7)
- (9:30) UMASS – Cameron Carson 21-yard field goal (Drive: 18 plays, 66 yards, 5:51; Tulane 21–10)

Third quarter

- (9:30) TUL – Michael Pratt 20-yard run, Kriston Esnard kick (Drive: 5 plays, 65 yards, 2:23; Tulane 28–10)
- (9:30) TUL – Duece Watts 31-yard pass from Michael Pratt, Kriston Esnard kick (Drive: 5 plays, 62 yards, 2:19; Tulane 35–10)
- (9:30) TUL – Lawrence Keys II 2-yard pass from Michael Pratt, Kriston Esnard kick (Drive: 7 plays, 27 yards, 3:04; Tulane 42–10)

Fourth quarter

None

Statistics	UMASS	TUL
First downs	14	20
Total yards	217	369
Rushes/yards	58–200	39–196
Passing yards	17	173
Passing: Comp–Att–Int	4–11–3	13–22–0
Time of possession	33:15	26:45

Team	Category	Player	Statistics
UMass	Passing	Gino Campiotti	2/6, 12 yards, 2 INT
UMass	Rushing	Tim Baldwin Jr.	13 carries, 65 yards
UMass	Receiving	George Johnson III	1 reception, 11 yards
Tulane	Passing	Michael Pratt	12/20, 164 yards, 2 TD
Tulane	Rushing	Tyjae Spears	12 carries, 57 yards, 3 TD
Tulane	Receiving	Jha'Quan Jackson	1 reception, 34 yards

=== vs Alcorn State (FCS) ===
Alcorn State Braves (0–1) vs Tulane Green Wave (1–0) – Game summary

Quarter	1	2	3	4	Total
Braves	0	0	0	0	0
Green Wave	17	14	14	7	52

at Yulman Stadium • New Orleans, LA

- Date: September 10, 2022
- Game time: 6:00 p.m.
- Game weather: Partly cloudy, 73 °F (23 °C)
- Game attendance: 14,501
- Referee: Nate Black
- TV announcers (ESPN+): Jack Benjamin (play-by-play) and Brian Kinchen (analyst)

Game information

First quarter

- (7:59) TUL – Kriston Esnard 26-yard field goal (Drive: 12 plays, 64 yards, 5:15; Tulane 3–0)
- (6:18) TUL – Shaadie Clayton-Johnson 6-yard run, Kriston Esnard kick (Drive: 3 plays, 27 yards, 1:11; Tulane 10–0)
- (3:10) TUL – Lawrence Keys III 7-yard run, Kriston Esnard kick (Drive: 3 plays, 52 yards, 1:02; Tulane 17–0)

Second quarter

- (13:38) TUL – Jha'Quan Jackson 16-yard pass from Michael Pratt, Kriston Esnard kick (Drive: 5 plays, 49 yards, 2:26; Tulane 24–0)
- (2:46) TUL – Tyrick James 25-yard pass from Michael Pratt, Kriston Esnard kick (Drive: 8 plays, 77 yards, 3:20; Tulane 31–0)

Third quarter

- (13:13) TUL – Shae Wyatt 72-yard pass from Michael Pratt, Kriston Esnard kick (Drive: 1 play, 72 yards, 0:00; Tulane 38–0)
- (8:58) TUL – Dea Dea McDougle 16-yard run, Kriston Esnard kick (Drive: 4 plays, 33 yards, 1:52; Tulane 45–0)

Fourth quarter

- (8:08) TUL – Justin Ibieta 3-yard run, Graham Dable kick (Drive: 13 plays, 86 yards, 5:48; Tulane 52–0)

Statistics	ALCN	TUL
First downs	4	30
Total yards	109	558
Rushes/yards	32–60	44–159
Passing yards	49	399
Passing: Comp–Att–Int	5–14–1	25–31–0
Time of possession	24:49	35:11

Team	Category	Player	Statistics
Alcorn State	Passing	Markevion Quinn	2/4, 34 yards
Alcorn State	Rushing	Javonta Leatherwood	8 carries, 30 yards
Alcorn State	Receiving	C. J. Bolar	1 reception, 19 yards
Tulane	Passing	Michael Pratt	17/21, 318 yards, 3 TD
Tulane	Rushing	Iverson Celestine	11 carries, 43 yards
Tulane	Receiving	Shae Wyatt	5 receptions, 130 yards, TD

=== at Kansas State ===
Tulane Green Wave (2–0) at Kansas State Wildcats (2–0) – Game summary

Quarter	1	2	3	4	Total
Green Wave	7	0	3	7	17
Wildcats	0	10	0	0	10

at Bill Snyder Family Football Stadium • Manhattan, KS

- Date: September 17, 2022
- Game time: 2:00 p.m.
- Game weather: Partly cloudy • Temperature: 88 °F (31 °C) • Wind: S 17 MPH
- Game attendance: 50,887
- Referee: Hank Johns
- TV announcers (ESPN+): Mark Neely (play-by-play), Todd Doxzon (analyst), and Shane Sparks (sideline)

Game information

First quarter

- (3:13) TUL – Tyjae Spears 1-yard run, Kriston Esnard kick (Drive: 9 plays, 91 yards, 3:32; Tulane 7–0)

Second quarter

- (2:43) KSU – Kade Warner 21-yard pass from Adrian Martinez, Chris Tennant kick (Drive: 8 plays, 75 yards, 3:23; Tied 7–7)
- (0:00) KSU – Chris Tennant 22-yard field goal (Drive: 6 plays, 19 yards, 0:28; Kansas State 10–7)

Third quarter

- (8:51) TUL – Kriston Esnard 30-yard field goal (Drive: 7 plays, 53 yards, 3:20; Tied 10–10)

Fourth quarter

- (4:27) TUL – Tyrick James 4-yard pass from Michael Pratt, Kriston Esnard kick (Drive: 5 plays, 52 yards, 2:11; Tulane 17–10)

Statistics	TUL	KSU
First downs	18	15
Total yards	336	336
Rushes/yards	40–160	42–186
Passing yards	176	150
Passing: Comp–Att–Int	13–26–2	21–31–0
Time of possession	28:17	31:43

Team	Category	Player	Statistics
Tulane	Passing	Michael Pratt	13/26, 176 yards, TD, 2 INT
Tulane	Rushing	Michael Pratt	13 carries, 87 yards
Tulane	Receiving	Duece Watts	3 receptions, 60 yards
Kansas State	Passing	Adrian Martinez	21/31, 150 yards, TD
Kansas State	Rushing	Deuce Vaughn	20 carries, 81 yards
Kansas State	Receiving	Malik Knowles	5 receptions, 52 yards

=== vs Southern Miss ===
Southern Miss Golden Eagles (2–1) vs Tulane Green Wave (3–0) – Game summary

Quarter	1	2	3	4	Total
Golden Eagles	0	10	7	10	27
Green Wave	7	10	0	7	24

at Yulman Stadium • New Orleans, LA

- Date: September 24, 2022
- Game time: 6:00 p.m.
- Game weather: Sunny, 81 °F (27 °C)
- Game attendance: 20,422
- Referee: Kevin Randall
- TV announcers (ESPN+): Jack Benjamin (play-by-play) and Brian Kinchen (analyst)

Game information

First quarter

- (10:14) TUL – Tyjae Spears 8-yard run, Kriston Esnard kick (Drive: 7 plays, 62 yards, 2:43; Tulane 7–0)

Second quarter

- (11:57) TUL – Tyjae Spears 34-yard run, Kriston Esnard kick (Drive: 6 plays, 87 yards, 3:03; Tulane 14–0)
- (6:01) USM – Jason Brownlee 23-yard pass from Zach Wilcke, Briggs Bourgeois kick (Drive: 5 plays, 44 yards, 1:45; Tulane 14–7)
- (2:31) USM – Briggs Bourgeois 36-yard field goal (Drive: 4 plays, 6 yards, 2:03; Tulane 14–10)
- (0:03) TUL – Kriston Esnard 28-yard field goal (Drive: 10 plays, 64 yards, 2:28; Tulane 17–10)

Third quarter

- (1:53) USM – Jakarius Caston 37-yard pass from Zach Wilcke, Briggs Bourgeois kick (Drive: 7 plays, 70 yards, 3:06; Tied 17–17)

Fourth quarter

- (8:26) USM – Briggs Bourgeois 26-yard field goal (Drive: 7 plays, 49 yards, 2:50; Southern Miss 20–17)
- (7:07) USM – Eric Scott 35-yard interception return, Briggs Bourgeois kick (Drive: 3 plays, 4 yards, 1:19; Southern Miss 27–17)
- (0:19) TUL – Jha'Quan Jackson 25-yard pass from Michael Pratt, Kriston Esnard kick (Drive: 4 plays, 72 yards, 0:37; Southern Miss 27–24)

Statistics	USM	TUL
First downs	13	26
Total yards	253	451
Rushes/yards	27–59	47–204
Passing yards	194	247
Passing: Comp–Att–Int	17–25–0	19–29–1
Time of possession	23:59	36:01

Team	Category	Player	Statistics
Southern Miss	Passing	Zach Wilcke	17/25, 194 yards, 2 TD
Southern Miss	Rushing	Frank Gore Jr.	16 carries, 44 yards
Southern Miss	Receiving	Jakarius Caston	8 receptions, 91 yards, TD
Tulane	Passing	Michael Pratt	19/29, 247 yards, TD, INT
Tulane	Rushing	Tyjae Spears	22 carries, 114 yards, 2 TD
Tulane	Receiving	Tyjae Spears	5 receptions, 74 yards

=== at Houston ===
Tulane Green Wave (3–1) at Houston Cougars (2–2) – Game summary

Quarter	1	2	3	4	OT	Total
Green Wave	0	7	7	7	6	27
Cougars	0	7	0	14	3	24

at TDECU Stadium • Houston, TX

- Date: September 30, 2022
- Game time: 6:00 p.m.
- Game weather: Cloudy, 54 °F (12 °C)
- Game attendance: 24,319
- Referee: Tim Rich
- TV announcers (ESPN): Beth Mowins (play-by-play), Kirk Morrison (analyst), and Stormy Buonantony (sideline)

Game information

First quarter

None

Second quarter

- (12:42) TUL – Duece Watts 13-yard pass from Kai Horton, Kriston Esnard kick (Drive: 5 plays, 63 yards, 2:18; Tulane 7–0)
- (6:10) HOU – Tank Dell 1-yard pass from Clayton Tune, Bubba Baxa kick (Drive: 7 plays, 29 yards, 3:28; Tied 7–7)

Third quarter

- (8:31) TUL – Jadon Canady 57-yard fumble return, Kriston Esnard kick (Drive: 4 plays, 19 yards, 1:18; Tulane 14–7)

Fourth quarter

- (10:04) HOU – Brandon Campbell 1-yard run, Bubba Baxa kick (Drive: 9 plays, 75 yards, 4:06; Tied 14–14)
- (3:04) HOU – Tank Dell 14-yard pass from Clayton Tune, Bubba Baxa kick (Drive: 10 plays, 80 yards, 5:03; Houston 21–14)
- (0:39) TUL – Tyrick James 3-yard pass from Kai Horton, Kriston Esnard kick (Drive: 11 plays, 75 yards, 2:25; Tied 21–21)

Overtime

- (0:00) HOU – Bubba Baxa 36-yard field goal (Drive: 3 plays, 7 yards, 0:00; Houston 24–21)
- (0:00) TUL – Tyjae Spears 10-yard pass from Kai Horton, Kriston Esnard kick (Drive: 2 plays, 25 yards, 0:00; Tulane 27–24)

Statistics	TUL	HOU
First downs	14	22
Total yards	273	383
Rushes/yards	28–84	48–175
Passing yards	189	208
Passing: Comp–Att–Int	16–26–0	22–33–0
Time of possession	23:05	36:55

Team	Category	Player	Statistics
Tulane	Passing	Kai Horton	11/22, 132 yards, 3 TD
Tulane	Rushing	Tyjae Spears	14 carries, 54 yards
Tulane	Receiving	Tyjae Spears	6 receptions, 85 yards, TD
Houston	Passing	Clayton Tune	22/33, 208 yards, 2 TD
Houston	Rushing	Brandon Campbell	19 carries, 66 yards, TD
Houston	Receiving	Tank Dell	8 receptions, 73 yards, 2 TD

=== vs East Carolina ===
East Carolina Pirates (3–2) vs Tulane Green Wave (4–1) – Game summary

Quarter	1	2	3	4	Total
Pirates	3	6	0	0	9
Green Wave	0	14	7	3	24

at Yulman Stadium • New Orleans, LA

- Date: October 8, 2022
- Game time: 2:30 p.m.
- Game weather: Sunny, 83 °F (28 °C)
- Game attendance: 14,193
- Referee: Luke Richmond
- TV announcers (ESPNU): Anish Shroff (play-by-play), Brock Osweiler (analyst), and Taylor McGregor (sideline)

Game information

First quarter

- (3:04) ECU – Owen Daffer 27-yard field goal (Drive: 12 plays, 70 yards, 5:30; East Carolina 3–0)

Second quarter

- (14:18) TUL – Tyrick James 3-yard pass from Michael Pratt, Valentino Ambrosio kick (Drive: 11 plays, 76 yards, 3:40; Tulane 7–3)
- (12:08) ECU – C. J. Johnson 24-yard pass from Holton Ahlers (Drive: 5 plays, 64 yards, 2:03; East Carolina 9–7)
- (4:12) TUL – Michael Pratt 1-yard run, Valentino Ambrosio kick (Drive: 16 plays, 93 yards, 7:50; Tulane 14–9)

Third quarter

- (3:00) TUL – Duece Watts 44-yard pass from Michael Pratt, Valentino Ambrosio kick (Drive: 3 plays, 80 yards, 1:08; Tulane 21–9)

Fourth quarter

- (4:30) TUL – Valentino Ambrosio 42-yard field goal (Drive: 7 plays, 23 yards, 4:24; Tulane 24–9)

Statistics	ECU	TUL
First downs	24	22
Total yards	419	391
Rushes/yards	23–131	32–41
Passing yards	288	350
Passing: Comp–Att–Int	32–52–2	28–35–0
Time of possession	27:25	32:35

Team	Category	Player	Statistics
East Carolina	Passing	Holton Ahlers	32/51, 288 yards, TD, 2 INT
East Carolina	Rushing	Marlon Gunn Jr.	7 carries, 67 yards
East Carolina	Receiving	Isaiah Winstead	9 receptions, 90 yards
Tulane	Passing	Michael Pratt	27/34, 326 yards, 2 TD
Tulane	Rushing	Tyjae Spears	16 carries, 53 yards
Tulane	Receiving	Duece Watts	4 receptions, 93 yards, TD

=== at South Florida ===
Tulane Green Wave (5–1) at South Florida Bulls (1–5) – Game summary

Quarter	1	2	3	4	Total
Green Wave	3	14	14	14	45
Bulls	7	7	10	7	31

at Raymond James Stadium • Tampa, FL

- Date: October 15, 2022
- Game time: 4:00 p.m. EST
- Game weather: Cloudy, 86 °F (30 °C)
- Game attendance: 31,053
- Referee: Kevin Randall
- TV announcers (ESPNU): Beth Mowins (play-by-play), Kirk Morrison (analyst), and Stormy Buonantony (sideline)

Game information

First quarter

- (8:54) TUL – Valentino Ambrosio 20-yard field goal (Drive: 15 plays, 71 yards, 5:04; Tulane 3–0)
- (1:59) USF – Jimmy Horn Jr. 8-yard pass from Gerry Bohanon, Spencer Shrader kick (Drive: 8 plays, 79 yards, 4:26; South Florida 7–3)

Second quarter

- (13:07) TUL – Michael Pratt 5-yard run, Valentino Ambrosio kick (Drive: 9 plays, 75 yards, 3:52; Tulane 10–7)
- (11:28) USF – Gerry Bohanon 33-yard run, Spencer Shrader kick (Drive: 4 plays, 75 yards, 1:39; South Florida 14–10)
- (0:03) TUL – Duece Watts 11-yard pass from Michael Pratt, Valentino Ambrosio kick (Drive: 15 plays, 63 yards, 4:08; Tulane 17–14)

Third quarter

- (4:52) USF – Spencer Shrader 16-yard field goal (Drive: 7 plays, 45 yards, 3:27; Tied 17–17)
- (4:41) TUL – Tyjae Spears 75-yard run, Valentino Ambrosio kick (Drive: 1 play, 75 yards, 0:11; Tulane 24–17)
- (3:39) TUL – Tyjae Spears 6-yard run, Valentino Ambrosio kick (Drive: 1 play, 6 yards, 0:06; Tulane 31–17)
- (0:09) USF – Xavier Weaver 17-yard pass from Katravis Marsh, Spencer Shrader kick (Drive: 2 plays, 18 yards, 0:39; Tulane 31–24)

Fourth quarter

- (13:11) TUL – Dea Dea McDougle 16-yard pass from Michael Pratt, Valentino Ambrosio kick (Drive: 5 plays, 72 yards, 1:51; Tulane 38–24)
- (9:08) TUL – Michael Pratt 1-yard run, Valentino Ambrosio kick (Drive: 7 plays, 54 yards, 3:41; Tulane 45–24)
- (4:06) USF – Dequan Stanley 73-yard pass from Katravis Marsh, Spencer Shrader kick (Drive: 4 plays, 88 yards, 1:54; Tulane 45–31)

Statistics	TUL	USF
First downs	30	13
Total yards	564	337
Rushes/yards	51–235	28–118
Passing yards	329	259
Passing: Comp–Att–Int	23–36–0	14–23–0
Time of possession	36:52	23:08

Team	Category	Player	Statistics
Tulane	Passing	Michael Pratt	23/35, 329 yards, 2 TD
Tulane	Rushing	Tyjae Spears	18 carries, 151 yards, 2 TD
Tulane	Receiving	Jha'Quan Jackson	7 receptions, 86 yards
USF	Passing	Katravis Marsh	7/15, 150 yards, 2 TD
USF	Rushing	Gerry Bohanon	5 carries, 59 yards, TD
USF	Receiving	Jimmy Horn Jr.	5 receptions, 98 yards, TD

=== vs Memphis ===
Memphis Tigers (4–3) vs No. 25 Tulane Green Wave (6–1) – Game summary

Quarter	1	2	3	4	Total
Tigers	0	0	14	14	28
No. 25 Green Wave	21	14	0	3	38

at Yulman Stadium • New Orleans, LA

- Date: October 22, 2022
- Game time: 2:30 p.m.
- Game weather: Sunny, 79 °F (26 °C)
- Game attendance: 30,100
- Referee: Edwin Lee
- TV announcers (ESPN2): Beth Mowins (play-by-play), Kirk Morrison (analyst), and Stormy Buonantony (sideline)

Game information

First quarter

- (9:39) TUL – Michael Pratt 6-yard run, Valentino Ambrosio kick (Drive: 11 plays, 80 yards, 5:21; Tulane 7–0)
- (8:09) TUL – Jha'Quan Jackson 90-yard punt return, Valentino Ambrosio kick (Drive: 3 plays, 6 yards, 1:30; Tulane 14–0)
- (2:02) TUL – Tyjae Spears 3-yard run, Valentino Ambrosio kick (Drive: 3 plays, 12 yards, 0:52; Tulane 21–0)

Second quarter

- (5:49) TUL – Shaadie Clayton-Johnson 4-yard run, Valentino Ambrosio kick (Drive: 10 plays, 70 yards, 4:46; Tulane 28–0)
- (0:25) TUL – Duece Watts 6-yard pass from Michael Pratt, Valentino Ambrosio kick (Drive: 10 plays, 53 yards, 3:17; Tulane 35–0)

Third quarter

- (8:48) MEM – Koby Drake 7-yard pass from Seth Henigan, Chris Howard kick (Drive: 13 plays, 75 yards, 6:12; Tulane 35–7)
- (4:05) MEM – Eddie Lewis 33-yard pass from Seth Henigan, Chris Howard kick (Drive: 8 plays, 68 yards, 3:38; Tulane 35–14)

Fourth quarter

- (14:02) MEM – Brandon Thomas 2-yard run, Chris Howard kick (Drive: 8 plays, 34 yards, 3:13; Tulane 35–21)
- (7:40) TUL – Valentino Ambrosio 25-yard field goal (Drive: 13 plays, 67 yards, 6:22; Tulane 38–21)
- (4:23) MEM – Eddie Lewis 55-yard pass from Seth Henigan, Chris Howard kick (Drive: 10 plays, 83 yards, 3:11; Tulane 38–28)

Statistics	MEM	TUL
First downs	23	19
Total yards	415	344
Rushes/yards	33–103	41–186
Passing yards	312	158
Passing: Comp–Att–Int	26–41–2	20–29–0
Time of possession	27:44	32:16

Team	Category	Player	Statistics
Memphis	Passing	Seth Henigan	26/41, 312 yards, 3 TD, 2 INT
Memphis	Rushing	Seth Henigan	13 carries, 42 yards
Memphis	Receiving	Eddie Lewis	3 receptions, 94 yards, 2 TD
Tulane	Passing	Michael Pratt	20/29, 158 yards, TD
Tulane	Rushing	Tyjae Spears	24 carries, 125 yards, TD
Tulane	Receiving	Dae Dae McDougle	5 receptions, 37 yards

=== at Tulsa ===
No. 19 Tulane Green Wave (7–1) at Tulsa Golden Hurricane (3–5) – Game summary

Quarter	1	2	3	4	Total
No. 19 Green Wave	10	7	7	3	27
Golden Hurricanes	3	7	3	0	13

at Skelly Field at H. A. Chapman Stadium • Tulsa, OK

- Date: November 5, 2022
- Game time: 11:00 a.m.
- Game weather: Sunny, 57 °F (14 °C)
- Game attendance: 15,122
- Referee: Hank Johns
- TV announcers (ESPNU): John Schiffren (play-by-play) and Rene Ingoglia (analyst)

Game information

First quarter

- (12:39) TUL – Tyrick James 10-yard pass from Michael Pratt, Valentino Ambrosio kick (Drive: 7 plays, 78 yards, 2:17; Tulane 7–0)
- (8:45) TLSA – Zack Long 46-yard field goal (Drive: 9 plays, 47 yards, 3:54; Tulane 7–3)
- (3:19) TUL – Valentino Ambrosio 20-yard field goal (Drive: 11 plays, 70 yards, 5:20; Tulane 10–3)

Second quarter

- (6:10) TUL – Tyjae Spears 34-yard run, Valentino Ambrosio kick (Drive: 9 plays, 88 yards, 3:55; Tulane 17–3)
- (0:59) TLSA – JuanCarlos Santana 28-yard pass from Braylon Baxter, Zack Long kick (Drive: 2 plays, 29 yards, 0:11; Tulane 17–10)

Third quarter

- (9:09) TUL – Shae Wyatt 20-yard pass from Michael Pratt, Valentino Ambrosio kick (Drive: 9 plays, 87 yards, 3:31; Tulane 24–10)
- (4:35) TLSA – Zack Long 40-yard field goal (Drive: 12 plays, 53 yards, 4:34; Tulane 24–13)

Fourth quarter

- (0:51) TUL – Valentino Ambrosio 33-yard field goal (Drive: 12 plays, 54 yards, 5:27; Tulane 27–13)

Statistics	TUL	TLSA
First downs	24	16
Total yards	482	257
Rushes/yards	53–357	34–111
Passing yards	125	146
Passing: Comp–Att–Int	11–19–1	13–25–0
Time of possession	34:02	25:58

Team	Category	Player	Statistics
Tulane	Passing	Michael Pratt	11/19, 125 yards, 2 TD, INT
Tulane	Rushing	Tyjae Spears	14 carries, 157 yards, TD
Tulane	Receiving	Duece Watts	2 receptions, 42 yards
Tulsa	Passing	Braylon Braxton	13/25, 146 yards, TD
Tulsa	Rushing	Deneric Prince	14 carries, 55 yards
Tulsa	Receiving	JuanCarlos Santana	2 receptions, 41 yards, TD

=== vs No. 22 UCF ===
No. 22 UCF Knights (7–2) vs No. 17 Tulane Green Wave (8–1) – Game summary

Quarter	1	2	3	4	Total
No. 22 Knights	17	7	7	7	38
No. 17 Green Wave	7	7	3	14	31

at Yulman Stadium • New Orleans, LA

- Date: November 12, 2022
- Game time: 2:30 p.m.
- Game weather: Cloudy, 57 °F (14 °C)
- Game attendance: 27,317
- Referee: Nate Black
- TV announcers (ESPN2): Anish Shroff (play-by-play), Brock Osweiler (analyst), and Taylor McGregor (sideline)

Game information

First quarter

- (12:17) UCF – Colton Boomer 25-yard field goal (Drive: 9 plays, 68 yards, 2:43; UCF 3–0)
- (10:49) UCF – John Rhys Plumlee 67-yard run, Colton Boomer kick (Drive: 2 plays, 70 yards, 0:42; UCF 10–0)
- (8:39) TUL – Duece Watts 1-yard pass from Michael Pratt, Valentino Ambrosio kick (Drive: 4 plays, 79 yards, 2:10; UCF 10–7)
- (2:24) UCF – Isaiah Bowser 2-yard run, Colton Boomer kick (Drive: 17 plays, 75 yards, 6:15; UCF 17–7)

Second quarter

- (7:18) UCF – Javon Baker 8-yard pass from John Rhys Plumlee, Colton Boomer kick (Drive: 13 plays, 85 yards, 5:56; UCF 24–7)
- (1:15) TUL – Michael Pratt 1-yard run, Valentino Ambrosio kick (Drive: 13 plays, 75 yards, 6:03; UCF 24–14)

Third quarter

- (8:58) UCF – John Rhys Plumlee 9-yard run, Colton Boomer kick (Drive: 8 plays, 83 yards, 4:20; UCF 31–14)
- (3:41) TUL – Valentino Ambrosio 23-yard field goal (Drive: 14 plays, 53 yards, 5:17; UCF 31–17)

Fourth quarter

- (11:39) TUL – Reggie Brown 2-yard pass from Michael Pratt, Valentino Ambrosio kick (Drive: 10 plays, 73 yards, 3:53; UCF 31–24)
- (3:32) UCF – Isaiah Bowser 1-yard run, Colton Boomer kick (Drive: 16 plays, 75 yards, 8:07; UCF 38–24)
- (1:46) TUL – Shae Wyatt 6-yard pass from Michael Pratt, Valentino Ambrosio kick (Drive: 8 plays, 75 yards, 1:46; UCF 38–31)

Statistics	UCF	TUL
First downs	27	21
Total yards	468	391
Rushes/yards	54–336	27–155
Passing yards	132	236
Passing: Comp–Att–Int	17–30–0	23–39–0
Time of possession	35:24	24:36

Team	Category	Player	Statistics
UCF	Passing	John Rhys Plumlee	17/30, 132 yards, TD
UCF	Rushing	John Rhys Plumlee	18 carries, 176 yards, 2 TD
UCF	Receiving	Javon Baker	5 receptions, 54 yards, TD
Tulane	Passing	Michael Pratt	23/39, 236 yards, 3 TD
Tulane	Rushing	Tyjae Spears	8 carries, 130 yards
Tulane	Receiving	Jha'Quan Jackson	5 receptions, 95 yards

=== vs SMU ===
SMU Mustangs (6–4) vs No. 21 Tulane Green Wave (8–2) – Game summary

Quarter	1	2	3	4	Total
Mustangs	0	7	7	10	24
No. 21 Green Wave	21	7	21	10	59

at Yulman Stadium • New Orleans, LA

- Date: November 17, 2022
- Game time: 6:30 p.m.
- Game weather: Clear, 50 °F (10 °C)
- Game attendance: 20,894
- Referee: Hank Johns
- TV announcers (ESPN): Matt Barrie (play-by-play), Louis Riddick (analyst), and Harry Lyles, Jr. (sideline)

Game information

First quarter

- (7:01) TUL – Michael Pratt 6-yard run, Valentino Ambrosio kick (Drive: 12 plays, 81 yards, 5:28; Tulane 7–0)
- (5:06) TUL – Tyjae Spears 2-yard run, Valentino Ambrosio kick (Drive: 4 plays, 81 yards, 1:07; Tulane 14–0)
- (0:00) TUL – Tyjae Spears 5-yard pass from Michael Pratt, Valentino Ambrosio kick (Drive: 2 plays, 7 yards, 0:49; Tulane 21–0)

Second quarter

- (13:54) SMU – R. J. Maryland 19-yard pass from Tanner Mordecai, Collin Rogers kick (Drive: 1 play, 19 yards, 0:09; Tulane 21–7)
- (12:22) TUL – Michael Pratt 26-yard run, Valentino Ambrosio kick (Drive: 3 plays, 37 yards, 1:32; Tulane 28–7)

Third quarter

- (13:32) TUL – Shae Wyatt 26-yard pass from Michael Pratt, Valentino Ambrosio kick (Drive: 3 plays, 45 yards, 1:28; Tulane 35–7)
- (7:32) TUL – Tyjae Spears 12-yard run, Valentino Ambrosio kick (Drive: 2 plays, 33 yards, 0:32; Tulane 42–7)
- (4:37) TUL – Shae Wyatt 48-yard pass from Michael Pratt, Valentino Ambrosio kick (Drive: 1 play, 48 yards, 0:09; Tulane 49–7)
- (1:53) SMU – R. J. Maryland 13-yard pass from Tanner Mordecai, Collin Rogers kick (Drive: 9 plays, 75 yards, 2:44; Tulane 49–14)

Fourth quarter

- (12:34) TUL – Michael Pratt 1-yard run, Valentino Ambrosio kick (Drive: 8 plays, 71 yards, 4:19; Tulane 56–14)
- (7:55) SMU – Collin Rogers 30-yard field goal (Drive: 13 plays, 62 yards, 4:39; Tulane 56–17)
- (3:40) TUL – Valentino Ambrosio 33-yard field goal (Drive: 7 plays, 42 yards, 4:15; Tulane 59–17)
- (0:51) SMU – Roderick Daniels Jr. 2-yard run, Collin Rogers kick (Drive: 9 plays, 75 yards, 2:49; Tulane 59–24)

Statistics	SMU	TUL
First downs	31	20
Total yards	470	451
Rushes/yards	41–141	42–310
Passing yards	329	141
Passing: Comp–Att–Int	35–52–2	9–14–0
Time of possession	33:46	26:14

Team	Category	Player	Statistics
SMU	Passing	Tanner Mordecai	32/49, 298 yards, 2 TD, 2 INT
SMU	Rushing	Tyler Lavine	18 carries, 82 yards
SMU	Receiving	Tyler Lavine	7 receptions, 62 yards
Tulane	Passing	Michael Pratt	9/14, 141 yards, 3 TD
Tulane	Rushing	Tyjae Spears	13 carries, 121 yards, 2 TD
Tulane	Receiving	Shae Wyatt	3 receptions, 108 yards, 2 TD

=== at No. 24 Cincinnati ===
No. 19 Tulane Green Wave (9–2) at No. 24 Cincinnati Bearcats (9–2) – Game summary

Quarter	1	2	3	4	Total
No. 19 Green Wave	3	10	7	7	27
No. 24 Bearcats	0	10	7	7	24

at Nippert Stadium • Cincinnati, OH

- Date: November 25, 2022
- Game time: 12:00 p.m. EST
- Game weather: Cloudy, 50 °F (10 °C)
- Game attendance: 37,989
- Referee: Luke Richmond
- TV announcers (ABC): Roy Philpott (play-by-play), Andre Ware (analyst), and Paul Carcaterra (sideline)

Game information

First quarter

- (5:17) TUL – Valentino Ambrosio 34-yard field goal (Drive: 8 plays, 37 yards, 2:50; Tulane 3–0)

Second quarter

- (14:57) CIN – Ryan Coe 28-yard field goal (Drive: 13 plays, 65 yards, 5:20; Tied 3–3)
- (4:58) TUL – Tyjae Spears 11-yard run, Valentino Ambrosio kick (Drive: 15 plays, 71 yards, 8:25; Tulane 10–3)
- (2:41) CIN – Charles McClelland 35-yard run, Ryan Coe kick (Drive: 7 plays, 75 yards, 2:17; Tied 10–10)
- (0:16) TUL – Valentino Ambrosio 47-yard field goal (Drive: 7 plays, 45 yards, 2:25; Tulane 13–10)

Third quarter

- (6:59) TUL – Tyjae Spears 2-yard run, Valentino Ambrosio kick (Drive: 6 plays, 40 yards, 3:19; Tulane 20–10)
- (0:42) CIN – Ryan Montgomery 8-yard run, Ryan Coe kick (Drive: 14 plays, 75 yards, 6:17; Tulane 20–17)

Fourth quarter

- (6:27) CIN – Ryan Montgomery 15-yard run, Ryan Coe kick (Drive: 13 plays, 63 yards, 4:47; Cincinnati 24–20)
- (5:10) TUL – Duece Watts 30-yard pass from Michael Pratt, Valentino Ambrosio kick (Drive: 4 plays, 75 yards, 1:17; Tulane 27–24)

Statistics	TUL	CIN
First downs	22	19
Total yards	383	337
Rushes/yards	48–221	43–235
Passing yards	162	102
Passing: Comp–Att–Int	13–22–0	10–26–1
Time of possession	33:59	26:01

Team	Category	Player	Statistics
Tulane	Passing	Michael Pratt	13/22, 162 yards, TD
Tulane	Rushing	Tyjae Spears	35 carries, 185 yards, 2 TD
Tulane	Receiving	Shae Wyatt	3 receptions, 62 yards
Cincinnati	Passing	Evan Prater	10/26, 102 yards, INT
Cincinnati	Rushing	Ryan Montgomery	17 carries, 95 yards, 2 TD
Cincinnati	Receiving	Will Pauling	2 receptions, 41 yards

=== vs No. 22 UCF (AAC Championship Game) ===
No. 22 UCF Knights (9–3) vs No. 18 Tulane Green Wave (10–2) – Game summary
(2022 AAC Football Championship Game)

Quarter	1	2	3	4	Total
No. 22 Knights	0	7	7	14	28
No. 18 Green Wave	10	7	7	21	45

at Yulman Stadium • New Orleans, LA

- Date: December 3, 2022
- Game time: 3:00 p.m.
- Game weather: Cloudy, 75 °F (24 °C)
- Game attendance: 30,118
- Referee: Hank Johns
- TV announcers (ABC): Dave Pasch (play-by-play), Dusty Dvoracek (analyst), and Tom Luginbill (sideline)

Game information

First quarter

- (7:46) TUL – Shae Wyatt 10-yard pass Michael Pratt, Valentino Ambrosio kick (Drive: 9 plays, 85 yards, 4:12; Tulane 7–0)
- (1:01) TUL – Valentino Ambrosio 27-yard field goal (Drive: 9 plays, 68 yards, 3:19; Tulane 10–0)

Second quarter

- (6:48) UCF – Xavier Townsend 5-yard run, Colton Boomer kick (Drive: 8 plays, 32 yards, 3:27; Tulane 10–7)
- (5:00) TUL – Lawrence Keys III 43-yard pass from Michael Pratt, Valentino Ambrosio kick (Drive: 4 plays, 75 yards, 1:48; Tulane 17–7)

Third quarter

- (12:09) TUL – Tyjae Spears 60-yard run, Valentino Ambrosio kick (Drive: 5 plays, 76 yards, 2:51; Tulane 24–7)
- (1:53) UCF – Kobe Hudson 17-yard pass from John Rhys Plumlee, Colton Boomer kick (Drive: 8 plays, 80 yards, 2:22; Tulane 24–14)

Fourth quarter

- (14:29) TUL – Duece Watts 73-yard pass from Michael Pratt, Valentino Ambrosio kick (Drive: 1 play, 73 yards, 0:11; Tulane 31–14)
- (12:26) UCF – Kobe Hudson 49-yard pass from R. J. Harvey, Colton Boomer kick (Drive: 6 plays, 75 yards, 2:03; Tulane 31–21)
- (9:48) UCF – Isaiah Bowser 10-yard run, Colton Boomer kick (Drive: 4 plays, 30 yards, 1:52; Tulane 31–28)
- (8:18) TUL – Shae Wyatt 60-yard pass from Michael Pratt, Valentino Ambrosio kick (Drive: 4 plays, 75 yards, 1:30; Tulane 38–28)
- (4:04) TUL – Michael Pratt 18-yard run, Valentino Ambrosio kick (Drive: 4 plays, 46 yards, 1:38; Tulane 45–28)

Statistics	UCF	TUL
First downs	23	20
Total yards	410	648
Rushes/yards	48–145	31–254
Passing yards	265	394
Passing: Comp–Att–Int	24–48–0	20–33–1
Time of possession	34:21	25:39

Team	Category	Player	Statistics
UCF	Passing	John Rhys Plumlee	21/39, 209 yards, TD
UCF	Rushing	Isaiah Bowser	20 carries, 85 yards, TD
UCF	Receiving	Kobe Hudson	4 receptions, 98 yards, 2 TD
Tulane	Passing	Michael Pratt	20/39, 394 yards, 4 TD, INT
Tulane	Rushing	Tyjae Spears	22 carries, 199 yards, TD
Tulane	Receiving	Duece Watts	3 receptions, 134 yards, TD

=== vs No. 10 USC (Cotton Bowl) ===
No. 16 Tulane Green Wave (11–2) vs No. 10 USC Trojans (11–2) – Game summary
(2023 Goodyear Cotton Bowl Classic)

Quarter	1	2	3	4	Total
No. 16 Green Wave	0	14	16	16	46
No. 10 Trojans	7	21	7	10	45

at AT&T Stadium • Arlington, TX

- Date: January 2, 2023
- Game time: 12:00 p.m.
- Game weather: Indoor
- Game attendance: 55,329
- Referee: Steve Marlowe
- TV announcers (ESPN/ESPN Deportes): Mark Jones (play-by-play), Robert Griffin III (analyst), and Quint Kessenich (sideline)/Javier Trejo Garay (play-by-play) and Ramiro Pruneda (analyst)

Game information

First quarter

- (5:58) USC – Michael Jackson III 9-yard pass from Caleb Williams, Denis Lynch kick (Drive: 17 plays, 75 yards, 9:02; USC 7–0)

Second quarter

- (12:33) USC – Terrell Bynum 3-yard pass from Caleb Williams, Denis Lynch kick (Drive: 12 plays, 95 yards, 5:13; USC 14–0)
- (9:30) TUL – Tyjae Spears 3-yard run, Valentino Ambrosio kick (Drive: 8 plays, 75 yards, 3:03; USC 14–7)
- (5:42) TUL – Jha'Quan Jackson 87-yard pass from Michael Pratt, Valentino Ambrosio kick (Drive: 2 plays, 92 yards, 0:50; Tied 14–14)
- (2:21) USC – Raleek Brown 39-yard run, Denis Lynch kick (Drive: 6 plays, 75 yards, 3:21; USC 21–14)
- (0:12) USC – Brenden Rice 4-yard pass from Caleb Williams, Denis Lynch kick (Drive: 6 plays, 68 yards, 1:07; USC 28–14)

Third quarter

- (11:55) TUL – Tyjae Spears 4-yard run, Valentino Ambrosio kick (Drive: 7 plays, 76 yards, 3:05; USC 28–21)
- (4:02) TUL – Valentino Ambrosio 42-yard field goal (Drive: 7 plays, 40 yards, 3:06; USC 28–24)
- (1:24) USC – Brenden Rice 19-yard pass from Caleb Williams, Denis Lynch kick (Drive: 5 plays, 97 yards, 2:38; USC 35–24)
- (0:40) TUL – Tyjae Spears 3-yard run (Drive: 3 plays, 65 yards, 0:44; USC 35–30)

Fourth quarter

- (12:09) USC – Kyron Hudson 4-yard pass from Caleb Williams, Denis Lynch kick (Drive: 7 plays, 47 yards, 3:31; USC 42–30)
- (4:30) USC – Denis Lynch 43-yard field goal (Drive: 11 plays, 46 yards, 6:16; USC 45–30)
- (4:07) TUL – Tyjae Spears 4-yard run, Valentino Ambrosio kick (Drive: 2 plays, 63 yards, 0:23; USC 45–37)
- (3:20) TUL – Team safety (Drive: 2 plays, -1 yards, 0:47; USC 45–39)
- (0:09) TUL – Alex Bauman 6-yard pass from Michael Pratt, Valentino Ambrosio kick (Drive: 12 plays, 66 yards, 3:11; Tulane 46–45)

Statistics	TUL	USC
First downs	16	29
Total yards	539	594
Rushes/yards	34–305	32–132
Passing yards	234	462
Passing: Comp–Att–Int	8–18–0	37–52–1
Time of possession	20:11	39:49

Team	Category	Player	Statistics
Tulane	Passing	Michael Pratt	8/17, 234 yards, 2 TD
Tulane	Rushing	Tyjae Spears	17 carries, 205 yards, 4 TD
Tulane	Receiving	Jha'Quan Jackson	1 reception, 87 yards, TD
USC	Passing	Caleb Williams	37/52, 462 yards, 5 TD, INT
USC	Rushing	Raleek Brown	6 carries, 61 yards, TD
USC	Receiving	Brenden Rice	6 receptions, 174 yards, 2 TD

== Rankings ==
Ranking movements Legend: ██ Increase in ranking ██ Decrease in ranking — = Not ranked RV = Received votes
	Week															
Poll	Pre	1	2	3	4	5	6	7	8	9	10	11	12	13	14	Final
AP	—	—	—	—	RV	RV	RV	25	23	19	16	21	19	18	14	9
Coaches	—	—	—	—	—	RV	RV	25	24	21	17	22	20	18	17	9
CFP	Not released									19	17	21	19	18	16	Not released
