= Ivan Pace Jr. =

American football player (born 2000)

No. 0 – Minnesota Vikings
- Position: Linebacker
- Roster status: Active

Personal information
- Born: December 16, 2000 (age 25); Cincinnati, Ohio, U.S.
- Listed height: 5 ft 10 in (1.78 m)
- Listed weight: 236 lb (107 kg)

Career information
- High school: Colerain (Cincinnati)
- College: Miami (OH) (2019–2021); Cincinnati (2022)
- NFL draft: 2023: undrafted

Career history
- Minnesota Vikings (2023–present)

Awards and highlights
- PFWA All-Rookie Team (2023); Unanimous All-American (2022); AAC Defensive Player of the Year (2022); First-team All-AAC (2022); First-team All-MAC (2021)

Career NFL statistics as of Week 10, 2026
- Total tackles: 256
- Sacks: 8.0
- Forced fumbles: 1
- Fumble recoveries: 2
- Pass deflections: 4
- Interceptions: 2
- Defensive touchdowns: 1
- Stats at Pro Football Reference

Ivan Pace Jr. (born December 16, 2000) is an American professional football linebacker for the Minnesota Vikings of the National Football League (NFL). He played college football for the Miami RedHawks before transferring to the Cincinnati Bearcats in 2022, where he was named a unanimous All-American and the AAC Defensive Player of the Year.

== Early life ==
Pace Jr. attended Colerain High School in Cincinnati, Ohio. He played linebacker and fullback in high school. He committed to Miami University to play college football.

== College career ==
=== Miami (OH) ===
Pace Jr. played in 13 games his true freshman year at linebacker and edge at Miami in 2019, recording 19 tackles and seven sacks. Six of those sacks came against Akron, which tied the NCAA record for most sacks in a game. In 2020, he started all three games in the COVID-19 pandemic shortened season and had 26 tackles. In 2021, he had 125 tackles, four sacks and an interception.

=== Cincinnati ===
Pace Jr. transferred to the University of Cincinnati after the 2021 season. He joined his brother, Deshawn, who also plays linebacker for the team. He was a starter his first year at Cincinnati in 2022.

== Professional career ==
Pre-draft measurables
Height	Weight	Arm length	Hand span	Wingspan	40-yard dash	10-yard split	20-yard split	20-yard shuttle	Three-cone drill	Vertical jump	Broad jump	Bench press
5 ft 10 1/2 in (1.79 m)	231 lb (105 kg)	30 1/4 in (0.77 m)	9 1/2 in (0.24 m)	6 ft 0 in (1.83 m)	4.62 s	1.70 s	2.66 s	4.40 s	7.18 s	35.0 in (0.89 m)	9 ft 8 in (2.95 m)	22 reps
All values from NFL Combine/Pro Day

Pace signed with the Minnesota Vikings as an undrafted free agent on April 29, 2023. On August 29, 2023, the Vikings announced that he had made the initial 53-man roster. In Week 14, Pace recorded 13 tackles, a sack, a tackle for loss, and an interception in a 3–0 win over the Las Vegas Raiders, earning National Football Conference Defensive Player of the Week. As a rookie, Pace appeared in all 17 games and made 11 starts. He had 2.5 sacks, 102 total tackles (63 solo), one interception, two passes defended, one forced fumble, and one fumble recovery. Pace was named to the PFWA NFL All Rookie Team.

In Week 7 of the 2024 season, against the Detroit Lions, Pace recorded a fumble recovery for a touchdown set up by teammate Josh Metellus. In a Week 18 rematch, he intercepted a Jared Goff pass, again set up by Metellus.

== NFL career statistics ==
Legend
**Bold**	Career high

=== Regular season ===
Year	Team	Games		Tackles					Interceptions						Fumbles				
Year	Team	GP	GS	Cmb	Solo	Ast	Sck	TFL	Int	Yds	Avg	Lng	TD	PD	FF	Fmb	FR	Yds	TD
2023	MIN	17	11	**102**	**63**	**39**	2.5	2	**1**	0	0.0	0	0	**2**	**1**	0	**1**	6	0
2024	MIN	11	10	72	36	36	**3.0**	**7**	**1**	**6**	**6.0**	**6**	0	1	0	0	**1**	**36**	**1**
2025	MIN	17	6	62	34	28	1.0	2	0	0	0.0	0	0	0	0	0	0	0	0
Career		45	27	236	133	103	6.5	11	2	6	3.0	6	0	3	1	0	2	42	1

=== Postseason ===
Year	Team	Games		Tackles					Interceptions						Fumbles				
Year	Team	GP	GS	Cmb	Solo	Ast	Sck	TFL	Int	Yds	Avg	Lng	TD	PD	FF	Fmb	FR	Yds	TD
2024	MIN	1	1	10	7	3	0.0	2	0	0	0.0	0	0	0	0	0	0	0	0
Career		1	1	10	7	3	0.0	2	0	0	0.0	0	0	0	0	0	0	0	0

== Personal life ==
Pace's younger brother, Deshawn, plays linebacker for the UCF Knights.
