= 2022 American Athletic Conference football season =

- League: NCAA Division I Football Bowl Subdivision
- Sport: Football
- Duration: September 1, 2022–January 31, 2023
- Teams: 11
- TV partner(s): ABC, ESPN, ESPN2, ESPNU, and CBS Sports Network

2023 NFL draft
- Top draft pick: WR Rashee Rice, SMU
- Picked by: Kansas City Chiefs, 55th overall

Regular season
- Season champions: Tulane
- Runners-up: UCF

American Athletic Conference Football Championship Game
- Champions: Tulane
- Runners-up: UCF
- Finals MVP: Michael Pratt, QB, Tulane

Seasons
- ← 2021 2023 →

2022 American Athletic Conference football standings
	Conf.			Overall
Team	W		L	W		L
No. 9 Tulane y$	7	–	1	12	–	2
UCF y	6	–	2	9	–	5
Cincinnati	6	–	2	9	–	4
SMU	5	–	3	7	–	6
Houston	5	–	3	8	–	5
East Carolina	4	–	4	8	–	5
Navy	4	–	4	4	–	8
Memphis	3	–	5	7	–	6
Tulsa	3	–	5	5	–	7
Temple	1	–	7	3	–	9
South Florida	0	–	8	1	–	11
Championship: Tulane 45, UCF 28
$ – Conference champion; y – Championship game participant; Rankings from AP Poll

The 2022 American Athletic Conference football season is the 31st NCAA Division I FBS Football season of the American Athletic Conference (The American). The season is the tenth since the former Big East Conference dissolved and became the American Athletic Conference and the ninth season of the College Football Playoff in place. The American is considered a member of the Group of Five (G5) together with Conference USA, the MAC, Mountain West Conference and the Sun Belt Conference. In September 2021, Cincinnati, Houston, and UCF accepted invitations to join the Big 12 Conference. The three schools had been contractually required to remain with The American through 2024, but the conference and its departing members reached a buyout agreement that allowed those schools to leave in 2023.

== Preseason ==
=== Recruiting classes ===
Rankings
Team	ESPN	Rivals	24/7
Cincinnati		41	42
East Carolina		78	84
Houston		52	49
Memphis		47	62
Navy		92	104
SMU		85	80
South Florida		83	87
Temple			108
Tulane		68	74
Tulsa			111
UCF		53	52

=== American Athletic Conference media day ===
The 2022 American Media day was held virtually on July 28, 2022

=== Preseason poll ===
The American Athletic Conference preseason media poll was released at AAC Media Day on July 28, 2022.

- First place votes in ()

Media poll
Predicted finish	Team	Votes (1st place)
1	Houston	243 (7)
2	Cincinnati	242 (10)
3	UCF	225 (7)
4	SMU	187
5	Memphis	162
6	East Carolina	157
7	Tulane	115
8	Tulsa	93
9	South Florida	71
10	Navy	61
11	Temple	28

=== Award watch lists ===
Award	Head Coach/Player	School	Position	Ref
Lott Trophy	none			
Dodd Trophy	Luke Fickell	Cincinnati	HC	
Maxwell Award	Keaton Mitchell	East Carolina	RB	
Maxwell Award	Clayton Tune	Houston	QB	
Maxwell Award	Nathaniel Dell	Houston	WR	
Maxwell Award	Tanner Mordecai	SMU	QB	
Maxwell Award	Michael Pratt	Tulane	QB	
Davey O'Brien Award	Gerry Bohanon	South Florida	QB	
Davey O'Brien Award	Tanner Mordecai	SMU	QB	
Davey O'Brien Award	Clayton Tune	Houston	QB	
Doak Walker Award	Isaiah Bowser	UCF	RB	
Doak Walker Award	Keaton Mitchell	East Carolina	RB	
Doak Walker Award	Johnny Richardson	UCF	RB	
Doak Walker Award	Tyjae Spears	Tulane	RB	
Biletnikoff Award	Nathaniel Dell	Houston	WR	
Biletnikoff Award	Nick Mardner	Cincinnati	WR	
Biletnikoff Award	Ryan O'Keefe	UCF	WR	
Biletnikoff Award	Xavier Weaver	South Florida	WR	
John Mackey Award	Christian Trahan	Houston	TE	
John Mackey Award	James Tyrick	Tulane	TE	
John Mackey Award	Josh Whyle	Cincinnati	TE	
John Mackey Award	Ryan Jones	East Carolina	TE	
John Mackey Award	Leonard Taylor	Cincinnati	TE	
John Mackey Award	KeMore Gamble	UCF	TE	
Rimington Trophy	Jacob Likes	Memphis	C	
Rimington Trophy	Sincere Haynesworth	Tulane	C	
Rimington Trophy	Matt Lee	UCF	C	
Butkus Award	Donavan Mutin	Houston	LB	
Butkus Award	Deshawn Pace	Cincinnati	LB	
Butkus Award	Ivan Pace	Cincinnati	LB	
Butkus Award	Isaac Slade-Matautia	SMU	LB	
Butkus Award	Dorian Williams	Tulane	LB	
Jim Thorpe Award	Davonte Brown	UCF	CB	
Jim Thorpe Award	Quindell Johnson	Memphis	S	
Jim Thorpe Award	Gervarrius Owens	Houston	S	

Award	Head Coach/Player	School	Position	Ref
Bronko Nagurski Trophy	Elijah Chatman	SMU	DT	
Bronko Nagurski Trophy	Antonio Grier	South Florida	LB	
Bronko Nagurski Trophy	Quindell Johnson	Memphis	S	
Bronko Nagurski Trophy	Gervarrius Owens	Houston	S	
Bronko Nagurski Trophy	Deshawn Pace	Cincinnati	LB	
Bronko Nagurski Trophy	Ivan Pace	Cincinnati	LB	
Bronko Nagurski Trophy	Divaad Wilson	UCF	S	
Outland Trophy	Elijah Chatman	SMU	DT	
Outland Trophy	Sincere Haynesworth	Tulane	C	
Outland Trophy	Dylan O'Quinn	Cincinnati	OT	
Outland Trophy	Patrick Paul	Houston	OT	
Outland Trophy	Lokahi Pauole	UCF	G	
Outland Trophy	Jake Renfro	Cincinnati	C	
Lou Groza Award	Ryan Coe	Cincinnati	K	
Lou Groza Award	Owen Daffer	East Carolina	K	
Lou Groza Award	Zack Long	Tulsa	K	
Lou Groza Award	Spencer Shrader	South Florida	K	
Ray Guy Award	Andrew Osteen	UCF	P	
Ray Guy Award	Brendan Hall	SMU	P	
Ray Guy Award	Joe Doyle	Memphis	P	
Ray Guy Award	Lachlan Wilson	Tulsa	P	
Ray Guy Award	Laine Wilkins	Houston	P	
Paul Hornung Award	Amad Anderson	Temple	WR	
Paul Hornung Award	Brian Battie	South Florida	RB	
Paul Hornung Award	Maquel Haywood	Navy	RB	
Paul Hornung Award	Jha'Quan Jackson	Tulane	WR	
Paul Hornung Award	Bryan Massey	SMU	S	
Paul Hornung Award	Ryan Montgomery	Cincinnati	RB	
Paul Hornung Award	Ryan O'Keefe	UCF	WR	
Wuerffel Trophy	Wilson Huber	Cincinnati	LB	
Wuerffel Trophy	Holton Ahlers	East Carolina	QB	
Wuerffel Trophy	Donavan Mutin	Houston	LB	
Wuerffel Trophy	Quindell Johnson	Memphis	S	
Wuerffel Trophy	Bijan Nichols	Navy	K	
Wuerffel Trophy	Terrance Newman	SMU	DT	
Wuerffel Trophy	Isaac Moore	Temple	OT	
Wuerffel Trophy	Nick Anderson	Tulane	LB	
Wuerffel Trophy	Davis Brin	Tulsa	QB	
Wuerffel Trophy	Isaiah Bowser	UCF	RB	
Wuerffel Trophy	Antonio Grier	South Florida	LB	

Award	Head Coach/Player	School	Position	Ref
Walter Camp Award	Tanner Mordecai	SMU	QB	
Bednarik Award	Deshawn Pace	Cincinnati	LB	
Bednarik Award	Gervarrius Owens	Houston	S	
Bednarik Award	Quindell Johnson	Memphis	S	
Rotary Lombardi Award	Dwayne Boyles	South Florida	LB	
Rotary Lombardi Award	Elijah Chatman	SMU	DT	
Rotary Lombardi Award	Lorenz Metz	Cincinnati	G	
Rotary Lombardi Award	Patrick Paul	Houston	OT	
Patrick Mannelly Award	Alex Ward	UCF	LS	
Patrick Mannelly Award	Ethan Hudak	Tulane	LS	
Earl Campbell Tyler Rose Award	Davis Brin	Tulsa	QB	
Earl Campbell Tyler Rose Award	Sincere Haynesworth	Tulane	C	
Earl Campbell Tyler Rose Award	Seth Henigan	Memphis	QB	
Earl Campbell Tyler Rose Award	Tanner Mordecai	SMU	QB	
Earl Campbell Tyler Rose Award	Ryan O'Keefe	UCF	RB	
Earl Campbell Tyler Rose Award	Rashee Rice	SMU	WR	
Earl Campbell Tyler Rose Award	JuanCarlos Santana	Tulsa	WR	
Earl Campbell Tyler Rose Award	Clayton Tune	Houston	QB	
Manning Award	Seth Henigan	Memphis	QB	
Manning Award	Tanner Mordecai	SMU	QB	
Manning Award	Clayton Tune	Houston	QB	
Polynesian College Football Player Of The Year Award	Tai Lavatai	Navy	QB	
Polynesian College Football Player Of The Year Award	Lokahi Pauole	UCF	OL	
Polynesian College Football Player Of The Year Award	Isaac Slade-Matautia	SMU	LB	
Johnny Unitas Golden Arm Award	Holton Ahlers	East Carolina	QB	
Johnny Unitas Golden Arm Award	Gerry Bohanon	South Florida	QB	
Johnny Unitas Golden Arm Award	Davis Brin	Tulsa	QB	
Johnny Unitas Golden Arm Award	D'Wan Mathis	Temple	QB	
Johnny Unitas Golden Arm Award	Tanner Mordecai	SMU	QB	
Johnny Unitas Golden Arm Award	Michael Pratt	Tulane	QB	
Johnny Unitas Golden Arm Award	Clayton Tune	Houston	QB	
Ted Hendricks Award				

==== All−American Teams ====
AP 1st Team	AP 2nd Team	WCFF 1st Team	WCFF 2nd Team	TSN 1st Team	TSN 2nd Team	ESPN	CBS 1st Team	CBS 2nd Team	CFN 1st Team	CFN 2nd Team	CFN HM	PFF 1st Team	PFF 2nd Team	PFF HM

== Coaches ==
=== Coaching changes ===
The American will enter the 2022 season with two new head football coaches:

- November 30, 2021 TCU hired Sonny Dykes of SMU as its new head coach. On November 29 SMU hired Rhett Lashlee formally the Offensive Coordinator at Miami as its new coach.
- November 29, 2021 Temple head coach Rod Carey was fired after having an 12–20 record in three seasons at Temple, including a 3–9 record in 2021. On December 15, Temple hired Texas associate head coach and run game coordinator Stan Drayton as its new head coach.

=== Head coaching records ===
Team	Head coach	Years at school	Overall record	Record at school	AAC Record
Cincinnati	Luke Fickell	6	54–22 (.711)	48–15 (.762)	29–9 (.763)
East Carolina	Mike Houston	4	94–44 (.681)	14–19 (.424)	9–15 (.375)
Houston	Dana Holgorsen	4	80–56 (.588)	19–15 (.559)	13–9 (.591)
Memphis	Ryan Silverfield	3	14–10 (.583)	14–10 (.583)	8–8 (.500)
Navy	Ken Niumatalolo	15	105–75 (.583)	105–75 (.583)	33–22 (.600)
SMU	Rhett Lashlee	0	0–0 (–)	0–0 (–)	0–0 (–)
South Florida	Jeff Scott	3	3–18 (.143)	3–18 (.143)	1–14 (.067)
Temple	Stan Drayton	0	0–0 (–)	0–0 (–)	0–0 (–)
Tulane	Willie Fritz	7	185–112 (.623)	31–43 (.419)	16–32 (.333)
Tulsa	Philip Montgomery	8	38–46 (.452)	38–46 (.452)	24–29 (.453)
UCF	Gus Malzahn	2	86–42 (.672)	9–4 (.692)	5–3 (.625)

Note:

- Records shown after the 2021 season
- Years at school includes 2022 season

=== Mid-season changes ===
- On November 6, South Florida fired head coach Jeff Scott after posting a record of 4–26 during his tenure at the school. South Florida named special teams coordinator Daniel Da Prato as the interim head coach. On December 4, South Florida announced that Tennessee offensive coordinator Alex Golesh would become the new head coach for the 2023 season.

=== Post-season changes ===
- On November 27, Luke Fickell was announced as the new head coach of the Wisconsin Badgers of the Big Ten Conference. In the wake of the announcement, Cincinnati named special teams coach Kerry Coombs as the interim head coach for the postseason. On December 5, Cincinnati announced that Louisville head coach Scott Satterfield would become the new head coach of the team for 2023.
- On November 27, Tulsa announced that it had fired head coach Philip Montgomery. Montgomery had posted a 43–53 record over eight seasons with the school. On December 6, Tulsa announced Ohio State offensive coordinator Kevin Wilson as the new head coach.
- On December 11, Navy announced that it would not retain head coach Ken Niumatalolo for 2023, which would have been the last year of his contract. Niumatalolo had gone 109–83 in 15 years at the school, but ended his tenure with three consecutive losing seasons and five losses in the Midshipmen's last seven matchups against Army. Defensive coordinator Brian Newberry was named the interim head coach.

== Rankings ==
Legend
	Improvement in ranking
	Drop in ranking
	Not ranked previous week
	No change in ranking from previous week
RV	Received votes but were not ranked in Top 25 of poll
т	Tied with team above or below also with this symbol

		Pre	Wk 2	Wk 3	Wk 4	Wk 5	Wk 6	Wk 7	Wk 8	Wk 9	Wk 10	Wk 11	Wk 12	Wk 13	Wk 14	Wk 15	Final
Cincinnati	AP	23	RV	RV	RV	RV	24	21	21	20	RV	RV	22	21	RV	RV	RV
Cincinnati	C	22	RV	RV	RV	RV	RV	21	19	19	RV	RV	21	21	RV	RV	RV
Cincinnati	CFP	Not released											25	24			
East Carolina	AP										RV						
East Carolina	C				RV												
East Carolina	CFP	Not released															
Houston	AP	24	25														
Houston	C	25	RV	RV													
Houston	CFP	Not released															
Memphis	AP																
Memphis	C																
Memphis	CFP	Not released															
Navy	AP																
Navy	C																
Navy	CFP	Not released															
SMU	AP																
SMU	C	RV															
SMU	CFP	Not released															
South Florida	AP																
South Florida	C																
South Florida	CFP	Not released															
Temple	AP																
Temple	C																
Temple	CFP	Not released															
Tulane	AP					RV	RV	RV	25	23	19	16	21	19	18	14	9
Tulane	C						RV	RV	25	24	21	17	22	20	18	17	9
Tulane	CFP	Not released									19	17	21	19	18	16	
Tulsa	AP																
Tulsa	C																
Tulsa	CFP	Not released															
UCF	AP	RV	RV						RV		25	22	17	25	22	RV	
UCF	C	RV	RV				RV	RV	RV	RV	25	21	18	RV	23	RV	RV
UCF	CFP	Not released									25	22	20	22	22		

== Schedule ==
The 2022 American Athletic Conference football schedule was released on February 17, 2022. The regular season begins on Thursday September 1, 2022 and will end on Saturday December 15, 2022. The American Athletic Conference Football Championship Game is scheduled to be played on Saturday December 3, 2022 at the site of the regular season champion.

Index to colors and formatting
AAC member won
AAC member lost
AAC teams in **bold**

All times Eastern time.

=== Regular season schedule ===
==== Week one ====
Date	Time	Visiting team	Home team	Site	TV	Result	Attendance	Ref.
September 1	7:00 p.m.	South Carolina State	**UCF**	FBC Mortgage Stadium • Orlando, FL	ESPN+	**W** 56–10	43,810	
September 2	7:30 p.m.	**Temple**	Duke	Wallace Wade Stadium • Durham, NC	ACCN	**L** 0–30	20,722	
September 3	Noon	No. 13 NC State	**East Carolina**	Dowdy–Ficklen Stadium • Greenville, NC	ESPN	**L** 20–21	51,711	
September 3	Noon	No. 19 (FCS) Delaware	**Navy**	Navy–Marine Corps Memorial Stadium • Annapolis, MD	CBSSN	**L** 7–14	30,542	
September 3	3:30 p.m.	No. 23 **Cincinnati**	No. 19 Arkansas	Donald W. Reynolds Razorback Stadium • Fayetteville, AR	ESPN	**L** 24–31	74,751	
September 3	3:30 p.m.	No. 24 **Houston**	UTSA	Alamodome • San Antonio, TX	CBSSN	**W** 37–35 ^{3OT}	37,526	
September 3	3:30 p.m.	**Tulsa**	Wyoming	War Memorial Stadium • Laramie, WY	FS1	**L** 37–40 ^{2OT}	20,574	
September 3	4:00 p.m.	No. 25 BYU	**South Florida**	Raymond James Stadium • Tampa, FL	ESPNU	**L** 21–50	31,521	
September 3	7:00 p.m.	UMass	**Tulane**	Yulman Stadium • New Orleans, LA	ESPN+	**W** 42–10	15,101	
September 3	7:30 p.m.	**Memphis**	Mississippi State	Davis Wade Stadium • Starkville, MS	ESPNU	**L** 23–49	54,360	
September 3	7:30 p.m.	**SMU**	North Texas	Apogee Stadium • Denton, TX (Safeway Bowl)	CBSSN	**W** 48–10	25,306	
^{#}Rankings from AP Poll released prior to game. All times are in Eastern Time.

==== Week two ====
Date	Time	Visiting team	Home team	Site	TV	Result	Attendance	Ref.
September 9	7:30 p.m.	Louisville	**UCF**	FBC Mortgage Stadium • Orlando, FL	ESPN2	**L** 14–20	44,412	
September 10	2:00 p.m.	Lafayette	**Temple**	Lincoln Financial Field • Philadelphia, PA	ESPN+	**W** 30–14	18,430	
September 10	3:30 p.m.	No. 19 (FCS) Kennesaw State	**Cincinnati**	Nippert Stadium • Cincinnati, OH	ESPN+	**W** 63–10	37,014	
September 10	3:30 p.m.	**Memphis**	**Navy**	Navy–Marine Corps Memorial Stadium • Annapolis, MD	CBSSN	**MEM** 37–13	30,082	
September 10	4:00 p.m.	No. 25 **Houston**	Texas Tech	Jones AT&T Stadium • Lubbock, TX	FS1	**L** 30–33 ^{2OT}	56,271	
September 10	6:00 p.m.	Old Dominion	**East Carolina**	Dowdy–Ficklen Stadium • Greenville, NC	ESPN+	**W** 39–21	36,853	
September 10	7:00 p.m.	Alcorn State	**Tulane**	Yulman Stadium • New Orleans, LA	ESPN+	**W** 52–0	14,501	
September 10	7:00 p.m.	Lamar	**SMU**	Gerald J. Ford Stadium • University Park, TX	ESPN+	**W** 45–16	26,509	
September 10	7:00 p.m.	Howard	**South Florida**	Raymond James Stadium • Tampa, FL	ESPN+	**W** 42–20	28,554	
September 10	7:00 p.m.	Northern Illinois	**Tulsa**	H.A. Chapman Stadium • Tulsa, OK	ESPN+	**W** 38–35	22,113	
^{#}Rankings from AP Poll released prior to game. All times are in Eastern Time.

==== Week three ====
Date	Time	Visiting team	Home team	Site	TV	Result	Attendance	Ref.
September 17	Noon	**Cincinnati**	Miami (OH)	Paycor Stadium • Cincinnati, OH (Victory Bell)	ESPNU	**W** 38–17	30,109	
September 17	2:00 p.m.	Rutgers	**Temple**	Lincoln Financial Field • Philadelphia, PA	ESPN+	**L** 14–16	33,297	
September 17	3:00 p.m.	**Tulane**	Kansas State	Bill Snyder Family Football Stadium • Manhattan, KS	ESPN+/B12N	**W** 17–10	50,887	
September 17	4:00 p.m.	Kansas	**Houston**	TDECU Stadium • Houston, TX	ESPNU	**L** 30–48	30,317	
September 17	6:00 p.m.	Campbell	**East Carolina**	Dowdy–Ficklen Stadium • Greenville, NC	ESPN+	**W** 49–10	43,036	
September 17	7:00 p.m.	Arkansas State	**Memphis**	Liberty Bowl Memorial Stadium • Memphis, TN (Paint Bucket Bowl)	ESPN+	**W** 44–32	32,620	
September 17	7:00 p.m.	Jacksonville State	**Tulsa**	H.A. Chapman Stadium • Tulsa, OK	ESPN+	**W** 54–17	17,311	
September 17	7:30 p.m.	**SMU**	Maryland	Maryland Stadium • College Park, MD	FS1	**L** 27–34	31,194	
September 17	7:30 p.m.	**South Florida**	No. 18 Florida	Ben Hill Griffin Stadium • Gainesville, FL	SECN	**L** 28–31	88,496	
September 17	7:30 p.m.	**UCF**	Florida Atlantic	FAU Stadium • Boca Raton, FL	CBSSN	**W** 40–14	30,991	
^{#}Rankings from AP Poll released prior to game. All times are in Eastern Time.

Date	Bye Week
September 17	Navy

==== Week four ====
Date	Time	Visiting team	Home team	Site	TV	Result	Attendance	Ref.
September 24	Noon	TCU	**SMU**	Gerald J. Ford Stadium • University Park, TX (rivalry)	ESPNU	**L** 34–42	35,569	
September 24	Noon	**South Florida**	Louisville	Cardinal Stadium • Louisville, KY	ACC RSN/ESPN3	**L** 3–41	41,217	
September 24	2:00 p.m.	UMass	**Temple**	Lincoln Financial Field • Philadelphia, PA	ESPN+	**W** 28–0	14,033	
September 24	3:30 p.m.	Indiana	**Cincinnati**	Nippert Stadium • Cincinnati, OH	ESPN2	**W** 45–24	38,464	
September 24	3:30 p.m.	North Texas	**Memphis**	Liberty Bowl Memorial Stadium • Memphis, TN	ESPN+	**W** 44–34	23,203	
September 24	4:00 p.m.	**Tulsa**	No. 16 Ole Miss	Vaught–Hemingway Stadium • Oxford, MS	SECN	**L** 27–35	60,641	
September 24	4:00 p.m.	Georgia Tech	**UCF**	FBC Mortgage Stadium • Orlando, FL	ESPNU	**W** 27–10	44,220	
September 24	6:00 p.m.	**Navy**	**East Carolina**	Dowdy–Ficklen Stadium • Greenville, NC	ESPN+	**NAVY** 23–20 ^{2OT}	39,227	
September 24	6:00 p.m.	Rice	**Houston**	TDECU Stadium • Houston, TX (rivalry)	ESPN+	**W** 34–27	26,377	
September 24	7:00 p.m.	Southern Miss	**Tulane**	Yulman Stadium • New Orleans, LA (Battle for the Bell)	ESPN+	**L** 24–27	20,422	
^{#}Rankings from AP Poll released prior to game. All times are in Eastern Time.

==== Week five ====
Date	Time	Visiting team	Home team	Site	TV	Result	Attendance	Ref.
September 30	7:00 p.m.	**Tulane**	**Houston**	TDECU Stadium • Houston, TX	ESPN	**TULN** 27–24 ^{OT}	24,319	
October 1	Noon	**Temple**	**Memphis**	Liberty Bowl Memorial Stadium • Memphis, TN	ESPNU	**MEM** 24–3	23,239	
October 1	Noon	**Navy**	Air Force	Falcon Stadium • Colorado Springs, CO	CBS	**L** 10–13	36,947	
October 1	2:30 p.m.	**East Carolina**	**South Florida**	FAU Stadium • Boca Raton, FL (Note: The East Carolina-South Florida game was moved to Boca Raton, Florida due to Hurricane Ian impact on the west coast of Florida.)	ESPN+	**ECU** 48–28	3,708	
October 1	7:00 p.m.	**Cincinnati**	**Tulsa**	H.A. Chapman Stadium • Tulsa, OK	ESPNU	**CIN** 31–21	21,111	
^{#}Rankings from AP Poll released prior to game. All times are in Eastern Time.

Date	Bye Week	
October 1	SMU	UCF

==== Week six ====
Date	Time	Visiting team	Home team	Site	TV	Result	Attendance	Ref.
October 5 (Note: Due to Hurricane Ian's impact on Orlando and surrounding areas, the UCF versus SMU football game was moved from Saturday, October 1 to Wednesday, October 5.)	7:00 p.m.	**SMU**	**UCF**	FBC Mortgage Stadium • Orlando, FL	ESPN2	**UCF** 41–19	27,495	
October 7	7:30 p.m.	**Houston**	**Memphis**	Liberty Bowl Memorial Stadium • Memphis, TN	ESPN2	**HOU** 33–32	28,126	
October 8	2:30 p.m.	**South Florida**	No. 24 **Cincinnati**	Nippert Stadium • Cincinnati, OH	ESPN+	**CIN** 28–24	38,557	
October 8	3:30 p.m.	**Tulsa**	**Navy**	Navy–Marine Corps Memorial Stadium • Annapolis, MD	CBSSN	**NAVY** 53–21	30,658	
October 8	3:30 p.m.	**East Carolina**	**Tulane**	Yulman Stadium • New Orleans, LA	ESPNU	**TULN** 24–9	14,193	
^{#}Rankings from AP Poll released prior to game. All times are in Eastern Time.

Date	Bye Week
October 8	Temple

==== Week seven ====
Date	Time	Visiting team	Home team	Site	TV	Result	Attendance	Ref.
October 13	7:00 p.m.	**Temple**	**UCF**	FBC Mortgage Stadium • Orlando, FL	ESPN	**UCF** 70–13	41,729	
October 14	7:30 p.m.	**Navy**	**SMU**	Gerald J. Ford Stadium • University Park, TX (Gansz Trophy)	ESPN	**SMU** 40–34	24,583	
October 15	4:00 p.m.	**Tulane**	**South Florida**	Raymond James Stadium • Tampa, FL	ESPNU	**TULN** 45–31	31,053	
October 15	7:30 p.m.	**Memphis**	**East Carolina**	Dowdy-Ficklin Stadium • Greenville, NC	ESPNU	**ECU** 47–45 ^{4OT}	38,059	
^{#}Rankings from AP Poll released prior to game. All times are in Eastern Time.

Date	Bye Week		
October 15	No. 21 Cincinnati	Houston	Tulsa

==== Week eight ====
Date	Time	Visiting team	Home team	Site	TV	Result	Attendance	Ref.
October 21	7:30 p.m.	**Tulsa**	**Temple**	Lincoln Financial Field • Philadelphia, PA	ESPN2	**TLSA** 27–16	13,607	
October 22	Noon	No. 21 **Cincinnati**	**SMU**	Gerald J. Ford Stadium • University Park, TX	ESPN	**CIN** 29–27	23,566	
October 22	Noon	**Houston**	**Navy**	Navy–Marine Corps Memorial Stadium • Annapolis, MD	ESPNU	**HOU** 38–20	32,443	
October 22	3:30 p.m.	**Memphis**	No. 25 **Tulane**	Yulman Stadium • New Orleans, LA	ESPN2	**TULN** 38–28	30,100	
October 22	7:30 p.m.	**UCF**	**East Carolina**	Dowdy–Ficklen Stadium • Greenville, NC	ESPNU	**ECU** 34–14	38,245	
^{#}Rankings from AP Poll released prior to game. All times are in Eastern Time.

Date	Bye Week
October 22	South Florida

==== Week nine ====
Date	Time	Visiting team	Home team	Site	TV	Result	Attendance	Ref.
October 28	8:00 p.m.	**East Carolina**	BYU	LaVell Edwards Stadium • Provo, UT	ESPN2	**W** 27–24	55,525	
October 29	Noon	**South Florida**	**Houston**	TDECU Stadium • Houston, TX	ESPN2	**HOU** 42–27	24,228	
October 29	3:30 p.m.	**Temple**	**Navy**	Navy–Marine Corps Memorial Stadium • Annapolis, MD	CBSSN	**NAVY** 27–20 ^{OT}	31,141	
October 29	3:30 p.m.	**SMU**	**Tulsa**	H.A. Chapman Stadium • Tulsa, OK	ESPN+	**SMU** 45–34	22,993	
October 29	3:30 p.m.	No. 20 **Cincinnati**	**UCF**	FBC Mortgage Stadium • Orlando, FL (rivalry)	ESPN	**UCF** 25–21	44,313	
^{#}Rankings from AP Poll released prior to game. All times are in Eastern Time.

Date	Bye Week	
October 29	Memphis	No. 23 Tulane

==== Week ten ====
Date	Time	Visiting team	Home team	Site	TV	Result	Attendance	Ref.
November 5	Noon	No. 19 **Tulane**	**Tulsa**	H.A. Chapman Stadium • Tulsa, OK	ESPNU	**TULN** 27–13	15,122	
November 5	2:00 p.m.	**South Florida**	**Temple**	Lincoln Financial Field • Philadelphia, PA	ESPN+	**TEM** 54–28	13,862	
November 5	4:00 p.m.	**Navy**	**Cincinnati**	Nippert Stadium • Cincinnati, OH	ESPNU	**CIN** 20–10	38,461	
November 5	3:30 p.m.	No. 25 **UCF**	**Memphis**	Liberty Bowl Memorial Stadium • Memphis, TN	ESPN2	**UCF** 35–28	28,048	
November 5	7:00 p.m.	**Houston**	**SMU**	Gerald J. Ford Stadium • University Park, TX (rivalry)	NFLN	**SMU** 77–63	23,841	
^{#}Rankings from College Football Playoff. All times are in Eastern Time.

Date	Bye Week
November 5	East Carolina

==== Week eleven ====
Date	Time	Visiting team	Home team	Site	TV	Result	Attendance	Ref.
November 10	7:30 p.m.	**Tulsa**	**Memphis**	Liberty Bowl Memorial Stadium • Memphis, TN	ESPN	**MEM** 26–10	23,980	
November 11	8:00 p.m.	**East Carolina**	**Cincinnati**	Nippert Stadium • Cincinnati, OH	ESPN2	**CIN** 27–25	38,199	
November 12	12:00 p.m.	No. 20 Notre Dame	**Navy**	M&T Bank Stadium • Baltimore, MD (Rip Miller Trophy)	ABC	**L** 32–35	62,124	
November 12	12:00 p.m.	**SMU**	**South Florida**	Raymond James Stadium • Tampa, FL	ESPNU	**SMU** 41–23	24,907	
November 12	3:00 p.m.	**Temple**	**Houston**	TDECU Stadium • Houston, TX	ESPN+	**HOU** 43–36	21,731	
November 12	3:30 p.m.	No. 22 **UCF**	No. 17 **Tulane**	Yulman Stadium • New Orleans, LA	ESPN2	**UCF** 38–31	27,317	
^{#}Rankings from College Football Playoff. All times are in Eastern Time.

==== Week twelve ====
Date	Time	Visiting team	Home team	Site	TV	Result	Attendance	Ref.
November 17	7:30 p.m.	**SMU**	No. 21 **Tulane**	Yulman Stadium • New Orleans, LA	ESPN	**TULN** 59–24	20,894	
November 18	9:00 p.m.	**South Florida**	**Tulsa**	H.A. Champman Stadium • Tulsa, OK	ESPN2	**TLSA** 48–42	13,819	
November 19	11:00 a.m.	**Navy**	No. 20 **UCF**	FBC Mortgage Stadium • Orlando, FL	ESPN2	**NAVY** 17–14	44,813	
November 19	2:00 p.m.	North Alabama	**Memphis**	Liberty Bowl Memorial Stadium • Memphis, TN	ESPN+	**W** 59–0	24,154	
November 19	2:00 p.m.	**Houston**	**East Carolina**	Dowdy-Ficklin Stadium • Greenville, NC	ESPN+	**HOU** 42–3	42,475	
November 19	4:00 p.m.	No. 25 **Cincinnati**	**Temple**	Lincoln Financial Field • Philadelphia, PA	ESPNU	**CIN** 23–3	14,673	
^{#}Rankings from College Football Playoff. All times are in Eastern Time.

==== Week thirteen ====
Date	Time	Visiting team	Home team	Site	TV	Result	Attendance	Ref.
November 25	12:00 p.m.	No. 19 **Tulane**	No. 24 **Cincinnati**	Nippert Stadium • Cincinnati, OH	ABC	**TULN** 27–24	37,989	
November 26	1:00 p.m.	**East Carolina**	**Temple**	Lincoln Financial Field • Philadelphia, PA	ESPN+	**ECU** 49–46	13,037	
November 26	3:30 p.m.	**Memphis**	**SMU**	Gerald J. Ford Stadium • University Park, TX	ESPN2	**SMU** 34–31	15,759	
November 26	7:00 p.m.	No. 22 **UCF**	**South Florida**	Raymond James Stadium • Tampa, FL (War on I-4)	ESPN2	**UCF** 46–39	32,217	
November 26	7:30 p.m.	**Tulsa**	**Houston**	TDECU Stadium • Houston, TX	ESPNU	**TLSA** 37–30	21,785	
^{#}Rankings from College Football Playoff. All times are in Eastern Time.

Date	Bye Week
November 26	Navy

==== Championship Game ====
Date	Time	Visiting team	Home team	Site	TV	Result	Attendance	Ref.
December 3	4:00 p.m.	No. 22 **UCF**	No. 18 **Tulane**	Yulman Stadium • New Orleans, LA (American Athletic Conference Football Championship Game)	ABC	**TULN** 45–28	30,118	
^{#}Rankings from College Football Playoff. All times are in Eastern Time.

==== Week fifteen ====
Date	Time	Visiting team	Home team	Site	TV	Result	Attendance	Ref.
December 10	3:00 p.m.	**Navy**	Army	Lincoln Financial Field • Philadelphia, PA (123rd Army–Navy Game, Commander-in-Chief's Trophy)	CBS	**L** 17–20 ^{2OT}	69,117	
^{#}Rankings from College Football Playoff. All times are in Eastern Time.

== The American vs other conferences ==
=== AAC vs Power Five matchups ===
The following games include AAC teams competing against Power Five conferences teams from the (ACC, Big Ten, Big 12, BYU/Notre Dame, Pac-12, and SEC). All rankings are from the AP Poll at the time of the game.

Date	Conference	Visitor	Home	Site	Score
September 2	ACC	Temple	Duke	Wallace Wade Stadium • Durham, NC	L 0–30
September 3	SEC	No. 23 Cincinnati	No. 19 Arkansas	Donald W. Reynolds Stadium • Fayetteville, AR	L 24–31
September 3	ACC	No. 13 NC State	East Carolina	Dowdy-Ficklin Stadium • Greenville, NC	L 20–21
September 3	SEC	Memphis	Mississippi State	Davis Wade Stadium • Starkville, MS	L 23–49
September 3	Independent	No. 25 BYU	South Florida	Raymond James Stadium • Tampa, FL	L 21–50
September 9	ACC	Louisville	UCF	FBC Mortgage Stadium • Orlando, FL	L 14–20
September 10	Big 12	No. 25 Houston	Texas Tech	Jones AT&T Stadium • Lubbock, TX	L 30–33 ^{2OT}
September 17	Big 12	Kansas	Houston	TDECU Stadium • Houston, TX	L 30–48
September 17	Big Ten	SMU	Maryland	Maryland Stadium • College Park, MD	L 27–34
September 17	SEC	South Florida	Florida	Ben Hill Griffin Stadium • Gainesville, FL	L 28–31
September 17	Big Ten	Rutgers	Temple	Lincoln Financial Field • Philadelphia, PA	L 14–16
September 17	Big 12	Tulane	Kansas State	Bill Snyder Family Football Stadium • Manhattan, KS	W 17–10
September 24	Big Ten	Indiana	Cincinnati	Nippert Stadium • Cincinnati, OH	W 45–24
September 24	Big 12	TCU	SMU	Gerald R. Ford Stadium • University Park, TX	L 34–42
September 24	ACC	South Florida	Louisville	Cardinal Stadium • Louisville, KY	L 3–41
September 24	SEC	Tulsa	No. 16 Ole Miss	Vaught–Hemingway Stadium • Oxford, MS	L 27–35
September 24	ACC	Georgia Tech	UCF	FBC Mortgage Stadium • Orlando, FL	W 27–10
October 29	Independent	East Carolina	BYU	LaVell Edwards Stadium • Provo, UT	W 27–24
November 12	Independent	Notre Dame	Navy	M&T Bank Stadium • Baltimore, MD†	L 32–35

=== AAC vs Group of Five matchups ===
The following games include AAC teams competing against "Group of Five" teams from C-USA, MAC, Mountain West and Sun Belt.

Date	Conference	Visitor	Home	Site	Score
September 3	C-USA	No. 24 Houston	UTSA	Alamodome • San Antonio, TX	W 37–35 ^{3OT}
September 3	C-USA	SMU	North Texas	Apogee Stadium • Denton, TX	W 48–10
September 3	Mountain West	Tulsa	Wyoming	War Memorial Stadium • Laramie, WY	L 37–40 ^{2OT}
September 10	C-USA	Old Dominion	East Carolina	Dowdy-Ficklin Stadium • Greenville, NC	W 39–21
September 10	MAC	Northern Illinois	Tulsa	H.A. Chapman Stadium • Tulsa, OK	W 38–35
September 17	MAC	Cincinnati	Miami (OH)	Paul Brown Stadium† • Cincinnati, OH	W 38–17
September 17	Sun Belt	Arkansas State	Memphis	Liberty Bowl Memorial Stadium • Memphis, TN	W 44–32
September 17	C-USA	UCF	Florida Atlantic	FAU Stadium • Boca Raton, FL	W 40–14
September 24	C-USA	Rice	Houston	TDECU Stadium • Houston, TX	W 34–27
September 24	C-USA	North Texas	Memphis	Liberty Bowl Memorial Stadium • Memphis, TN	W 44–34
September 24	C-USA	Southern Miss	Tulane	Yulman Stadium • New Orleans, LA	L 24–27
October 1	Mountain West	Navy	Air Force	Falcon Stadium • Colorado Springs, CO	L 10–13

=== AAC vs FBS independents matchups ===
The following games include AAC teams competing against FBS Independents, which includes Army, Liberty, New Mexico State, UConn and UMass.

Date	Visitor	Home	Site	Score
September 3	UMass	Tulane	Yulman Stadium • New Orleans, LA	W 42–10
September 24	UMass	Temple	Lincoln Financial Field • Philadelphia, PA	W 28–0
December 10	Navy	Army	Lincoln Financial Field • Philadelphia, PA†	L 17–20 ^{2OT}

=== AAC vs FCS matchups ===
The following games include AAC teams competing against Football Championship Subdivision teams, which comprises 14 conferences and two independent programs.

Date	Visitor	Home	Site	Score
September 1	South Carolina State	UCF	FBC Mortgage Stadium • Orlando, FL	W 56–10
September 3	Delaware	Navy	Navy–Marine Corps Memorial Stadium • Annapolis, MD	L 7–14
September 10	Kennesaw State	Cincinnati	Nippert Stadium • Cincinnati, OH	W 63–10
September 10	Lamar	SMU	Gerald J. Ford Stadium • University Park, TX	W 45–16
September 10	Howard	South Florida	Raymond James Stadium • Tampa, FL	W 42–20
September 10	Lafayette	Temple	Lincoln Financial Field • Philadelphia, PA	W 30–14
September 10	Alcorn State	Tulane	Yulman Stadium • New Orleans, LA	W 52–0
September 17	Campbell	East Carolina	Dowdy-Ficklin Stadium • Greenville, NC	W 49–10
September 17	Jacksonville State	Tulsa	H.A. Champman Stadium • Tulsa, OK	W 54–17
November 19	North Alabama	Memphis	Liberty Bowl Memorial Stadium • Memphis, TN	W 59–0

Note:† Denotes Neutral Site Game

=== AAC Records against other conferences ===
2022–2023 records against non-conference foes:

Regular season

Power 5 Conferences	Record
ACC	1–4
Big 12	1–3
Big Ten	1–2
BYU/Notre Dame	1–2
Pac-12	0–0
SEC	0–4
Power 5 Total	4–15
Other FBS Conferences	Record
C-USA	6–1
Independents (Excluding BYU/Notre Dame)	2–1
MAC	2–0
Mountain West	0–2
Sun Belt	1–0
Other FBS Total	11–4
FCS Opponents	Record
Football Championship Subdivision	9–1
Total Non-Conference Record	24–20

Postseason

Power 5 Conferences	Record
ACC	0–2
Big Ten	0–0
Big 12	0–0
BYU/Notre Dame	0–1
Pac-12	1–0
SEC	0–0
Power 5 Total	1–3
Other FBS Conferences	Record
C-USA	0–0
Independents (Excluding BYU/Notre Dame)	0–0
MAC	0–0
Mountain West	1–0
Sun Belt	2–0
Other FBS Total	3–0
Total Bowl Record	4–3

== Postseason ==
=== Bowl games ===
Bowl games will begin on December 17, 2022, and will end with the College Football Playoff National Championship on January 9, 2023.

For the 2020–2025 bowl cycle, The American will annually send teams to the Military Bowl, Fenway Bowl, and a third annual spot alternating between the Armed Forces Bowl and Hawaii Bowl annually. The American will have annually four appearances in the following bowls: Birmingham Bowl, Gasparilla Bowl, Boca Raton Bowl, Frisco Bowl, Cure Bowl, First Responder Bowl, Myrtle Beach Bowl and New Mexico Bowl. The American champion will go to a New Year's Six bowl if a team finishes higher than the champions of Group of Five conferences in the final College Football Playoff rankings, American teams are also eligible for the College Football Playoff if they're among the top four teams in the final CFP ranking.

Legend
AAC win
AAC loss

Bowl game	Date	Site	Television	Time (EST)	AAC team	Opponent	Score	Attendance
Fenway Bowl	December 17	Fenway Park • Boston, MA	ESPN	11:00 a.m.	Cincinnati	Louisville	L 7–24	15,000
New Mexico Bowl	December 17	University Stadium • Albuquerque, NM	ESPN	7:30 p.m.	SMU	BYU	L 23–24	22,209
Independence Bowl	December 23	Independence Stadium • Shreveport, LA	ESPN	3:00 p.m.	Houston	Louisiana	W 23–16	23,410
First Responder Bowl	December 27	Gerald J. Ford Stadium • Dallas, TX	ESPN	3:15 p.m.	Memphis	Utah State	W 38–10	
Birmingham Bowl	December 27	Protective Stadium • Birmingham, AL	ESPN	6:45 p.m.	East Carolina	Coastal Carolina	W 53–29	15,901
Military Bowl	December 28	Navy–Marine Corps Memorial Stadium • Annapolis, MD	ESPN	2:00 p.m.	UCF	Duke	L 13–30	17,974
New Year's Six Bowl
Cotton Bowl Classic	January 2, 2023	AT&T Stadium • Arlington, TX	ESPN	1:00 p.m.	No. 16 Tulane	No. 10 USC	W 46–45	55,329

Rankings are from CFP Poll • All times Eastern Time Zone.

=== Selection of teams ===
- Bowl eligible (7): Cincinnati, East Carolina, Houston, Memphis, SMU, Tulane, UCF
- Bowl-ineligible (4): Navy, South Florida, Temple, Tulsa

== Awards and honors ==
=== Player of the week honors ===
Week	Offensive			Defensive			Specialist		
Week	Player	Team	Position	Player	Team	Position	Player	Team	Position
Week 1	Clayton Tune	Houston	QB	Macon Clark	Tulane	S	Bubba Baxa	Houston	K
Week 2	Davis Brin	Tulsa	QB	Derek Parish	Houston	DE	De'Von Fox	Temple	WR
Week 3	John Rhys Plumlee	UCF	QB	Nick Anderson	Tulane	LB	Mason Fletcher	Cincinnati	P
Week 4	Tyler Scott	Cincinnati	WR	Ivan Pace Jr.	Cincinnati	LB	Daniel Davies	Navy	K
Week 5	Holton Ahlers	East Carolina	QB	Nick Anderson (2)	Tulane	LB	Joe Doyle	Memphis	P
Week 6	Clayton Tune (2)	Houston	QB	Macon Clark (2)	Tulane	S	Jayce Rogers	Houston	DB
Week 7	John Rhys Plumlee (2)	UCF	QB	Julius Wood	East Carolina	S	Chris Howard	Memphis	K
Week 8	Clayton Tune (3)	Houston	QB	Jireh Wilson	East Carolina	S	Mason Fletcher (2)	Cincinnati	P
Week 9	Clayton Tune (4)	Houston	QB	Josh Celiscar	UCF	DE	Andrew Conrad	East Carolina	K
Week 10	Tanner Mordecai	SMU	QB	Dorian Williams	Tulane	LB	Camden Price	Temple	K
Week 11	John Rhys Plumlee (3)	UCF	QB	Justin Wright	Tulsa	LB	Chris Howard (2)	Memphis	K
Week 12	Michael Pratt	Tulane	QB	John Marshall	Navy	LB/S	Ryan Coe	Cincinnati	K
Week 13	Tyjae Spears	Tulane	RB	Brandon Crossley	SMU	S	Jsi Hatfield	East Carolina	WR

=== American Athletic Individual Awards ===
The following individuals received postseason honors as chosen by the league's head coaches.

Award	Player	School
Offensive Player of the Year	Tyjae Spears	Tulane
Defensive Player of the Year	Ivan Pace Jr.	Cincinnati
Special Teams Player of the Year	Mason Fletcher	Cincinnati
Rookie of the Year	E. J. Warner	Temple
Coach of the Year	Willie Fritz*	Tulane

=== All-Conference Teams ===
The following players were selected part of the All-Conference teams.

Position	Player	Team
First Team Offense
WR	Nathaniel Dell	Houston
WR	Rashee Rice	SMU
WR	Keylon Stokes	Tulsa
OT	Ryan Swoboda	UCF
OT	Patrick Paul	Houston
OG	Lokahi Pauole	UCF
OG	Cam'Ron Johnson	Houston
OG	Prince Pines	Tulane
C	Sincere Haynesworth	Tulane
TE	Josh Whyle	Cincinnati
QB	Clayton Tune	Houston
RB	Keaton Mitchell	East Carolina
RB	Tyjae Spears	Tulane
First Team Defense
DL	Ricky Barber	UCF
DL	Tre'Mon Morris-Brash	UCF
DL	Jowon Briggs	Cincinnati
DL	Dontay Corleone	Cincinnati
DL	D'Anthony Jones	Houston
DL	Darian Varner	Temple
LB	Jason Johnson	UCF
LB	Ivan Pace Jr.	Cincinnati
LB	John Marshall*	Navy
LB	Dorian Williams	Tulane
CB	Ja'Quan Sheppard	Cincinnati
CB	Jarius Monroe	Tulane
S	Quindell Johnson	Memphis
S	Macon Clark	Tulane
First Team Special Teams
K	Chris Howard	Memphis
P	Mason Fletcher	Cincinnati
RS	Jimmy Horn Jr.	South Florida

Position	Player	Team
Second Team Offense
WR	Ryan O'Keefe	UCF
WR	Tyler Scott	Cincinnati
WR	C.J. Johnson	East Carolina
WR	Xavier Weaver	South Florida
OT	James Tunstall	Cincinnati
OT	Joey Claybrook	Tulane
OG	Sam Jackson	UCF
OG	Justin Osborne	SMU
C	Matt Lee	UCF
TE	Caden Prieskorn	Memphis
QB	Michael Pratt	Tulane
RB	Isaiah Bowser	UCF
RB	Brian Battie	South Florida
Second Team Defense
DL	Elijah Chatman	SMU
DL	Darius Hodges	Tulane
DL	Patrick Jenkins	Tulane
DL	Anthony Goodlow	Tulsa
LB	Xavier Cullens	Memphis
LB	Layton Jordan	Temple
LB	Nick Anderson	Tulane
LB	Justin Wright	Tulsa
CB	Malik Fleming	East Carolina
CB	Art Green	Houston
S	Ja'Von Hicks	Cincinnati
S	Gervarrius Owens	Houston
Second Team Special Teams
K	Ryan Coe	Cincinnati
P	Casey Glover	Tulane
RS	Jha'Quan Jackson	Tulane

* Denotes Unanimous Selection

All Conference Honorable Mentions:

- Cincinnati: Arquon Bush (CB), Joe Huber (OT), Dylan O'Quinn (OG)
- East Carolina: Isaiah Winstead (WR)
- Houston: Jayce Rogers (DB)
- Memphis: Jaylon Allen (DL), Davion Ross (CB)
- Navy: Jacob Busic (DL)
- South Florida: Dwayne Boyles Jr. (LB), Brad Cecil (C)
- SMU: Jaylon Thomas (OG)
- Tulane: Larry Brooks (S), Tyrick James (TE)
- Tulsa: Tyon Davis (CB)

=== All-Americans ===
The 2022 College Football All-America Team is composed of the following College Football All-American first teams chosen by the following selector organizations: Associated Press (AP), Football Writers Association of America (FWAA), American Football Coaches Association (AFCA), Walter Camp Foundation (WCFF), Sporting News (TSN, from its historic name of The Sporting News), Sports Illustrated (SI), The Athletic (Athletic), USA Today (USAT) ESPN, CBS Sports (CBS), College Football News (CFN), Athlon Sports, Phil Steele, and Fox Sports (FOX).

Currently, the NCAA compiles consensus all-America teams using a point system computed from All-America teams named by coaches associations or media sources. Players are chosen against other players playing at their position only. To be selected a consensus All-American, players must be chosen to the first team on at least half of the five official selectors as recognized by the NCAA. Second- and third-team honors are used to break ties. Players named first-team by all five selectors are deemed unanimous All-Americans. Currently, the NCAA recognizes All-Americans selected by the AP, AFCA, FWAA, TSN, and the WCFF to determine consensus and unanimous All-Americans.

Position	Player	School	Selector	Unanimous	Consensus
First Team All-Americans
LB	Ivan Pace Jr.	Cincinnati	(AFCA, AP, CBS, ESPN, FWAA, The Athletic, TSN, USAT, WCFF)	*	*

Position	Player	School	Selector
Second Team All-Americans
WR	Nathaniel Dell	Houston	(AFCA, The Athletic, TSN, USAT, WCFF)
WR	Rashee Rice	SMU	(AP, FWAA, WCFF)

Position	Player	School	Selector
Third Team All-Americans
WR	Nathaniel Dell	Houston	(AP)
DT	Dontay Corleone	Cincinnati	(AP)
P	Mason Fletcher	Cincinnati	(AP)

==== List of All American Teams ====
- American Football Coaches Association All-America Team
- Associated Press All-America Team
- CBS Sports All-America Team
- ESPN All-America Team
- Football Writers Association of America All-America Team
- The Athletic All-America Team
- Sporting News 2022 College Football All-America Team
- USA Today All-America Team
- Walter Camp Football Foundation All-America Team

== NFL draft ==
The following list includes all AAC players who were drafted in the 2023 NFL draft.

Player	Position	School	Draft Round	Round Pick	Overall Pick	Team
Rashee Rice	WR	SMU	2	24	55	Kansas City Chiefs
Nathaniel Dell	WR	Houston	3	6	69	Houston Texans
Tyjae Spears	RB	Tulane	3	18	81	Tennessee Titans
Dorian Williams	LB	Tulane	3	28	91	Buffalo Bills
Tre Tucker	WR	Cincinnati	3	37	100	Las Vegas Raiders
Tyler Scott	WR	Cincinnati	4	31	133	Chicago Bears
Clayton Tune	QB	Houston	5	4	139	Arizona Cardinals
Josh Whyle	TE	Cincinnati	5	12	147	Tennessee Titans
Derek Parish	FB	Houston	7	23	240	Jacksonville Jaguars
Gervarrius Owens	S	Houston	7	37	254	New York Giants
