= Elijah Chatman =

American football player (born 2000)

Profile
- Position: Defensive tackle

Personal information
- Born: December 5, 2000 (age 25); Shreveport, Louisiana, U.S.
- Listed height: 6 ft 0 in (1.83 m)
- Listed weight: 278 lb (126 kg)

Career information
- High school: Evangel Christian Academy (Shreveport, Louisiana)
- College: SMU (2019–2023)
- NFL draft: 2024: undrafted

Career history
- New York Giants (2024–2025); Cleveland Browns (2026)*
- * Offseason or practice squad member only

Awards and highlights
- First-team All-AAC (2023); 2× Second-team All-AAC (2021, 2022)

Career NFL statistics as of 2025
- Tackles: 24
- Sacks: 1
- Fumble recoveries: 1
- Stats at Pro Football Reference

Elijah Chatman (born December 5, 2000) is an American professional football defensive tackle. He played college football for the SMU Mustangs and was signed by the Giants as an undrafted free agent in 2024.

== Early life ==
Chatman was born on December 5, 2000, and grew up in Shreveport, Louisiana. He is the youngest of four siblings. He started playing football at age six and showed "incredible" strength from a young age; according to The Dallas Morning News, he was able to lift 225 pounds (102 kg) in seventh grade with only "slight difficulty". He attended Evangel Christian Academy in Shreveport where he was a standout lineman, being named the LSWA Class 5A Defensive Player of the Year, first-team all-state and the district most valuable player as a senior.

Chatman also was a top student, compiling a grade-point average (GPA) of 3.9, and set the school bench press record of 455 pounds (206 kg) and later 475 pounds (215 kg). A three-star recruit, he was part of the Shreveport Times Top 10 list and committed to play college football for the SMU Mustangs.

== College career ==
At SMU, Chatman mainly played as a defensive lineman, but also saw time at fullback. He appeared in 11 games as a freshman in 2019, recording 11 tackles and a half-sack, being selected American Athletic Conference (AAC) All-Academic. He started all 10 games in the 2020 season, posting 25 tackles, 7.5 tackles-for-loss (TFLs), 3.0 sacks and two fumble recoveries. In 2021, he started 11-of-12 games and totaled 40 tackles, 10 TFLs and 2.5 sacks, earning second-team All-AAC hobors.

By the 2022 season, Chatman was able to bench press 495 pounds (225 kg), was able to do 42 consecutive reps at 225 pounds (102 kg) (something only 11 NFL Scouting Combine participants were ever able to surpass), back-squat 615 pounds (279 kg) and power clean 315 pounds (143 kg). Prior to the season, he earned a spot on Bruce Feldman of The Athletic's "freaks" list, highlighting the most athletic college football players. That year, he started 11-of-13 games and recorded 39 tackles, four TFLs and three sacks, being chosen second-team All-AAC and to the Dave Campbell's Texas Football All-Texas second-team. He returned for a final season in 2023 and started 11 games, posting 33 tackles, nine TFLs and 5.5 sacks, being selected first-team All-AAC. He ended his collegiate career with 148 tackles, 34 TFLs and 13.5 sacks. His 60 career games played also placed second in school history.

== Professional career ==
Pre-draft measurables
Height	Weight	Arm length	Hand span	Wingspan	40-yard dash	10-yard split	20-yard split	20-yard shuttle	Three-cone drill	Vertical jump	Broad jump	Bench press
5 ft 11 1/8 in (1.81 m)	278 lb (126 kg)	32 3/4 in (0.83 m)	9 7/8 in (0.25 m)	6 ft 4 1/8 in (1.93 m)	4.81 s	1.71 s	2.81 s	4.59 s	7.85 s	31.0 in (0.79 m)	9 ft 4 in (2.84 m)	32 reps
All values from Pro Day

=== New York Giants ===
After going unselected in the 2024 NFL draft, Chatman was signed by the New York Giants as an undrafted free agent. He impressed after rookie minicamp which led him to being signed. Chatman was notably among the 53 players to make the Giants initial regular season roster. In week 3 against the Cleveland Browns Chatman recorded his first career sack.

On August 26, 2025, Chatman was waived by the Giants as part of final roster cuts and re-signed to the practice squad the next day. He was promoted to the active roster on December 27.

On May 7, 2026, Chatman was released by the Giants after two years.

=== Cleveland Browns ===
On May 8, 2026, Chatman was claimed off waivers by the Cleveland Browns. On August 30, he was waived by Cleveland as a part of final roster cuts with an injury designation.
