= Tyjae Spears =

American football player (born 2001)

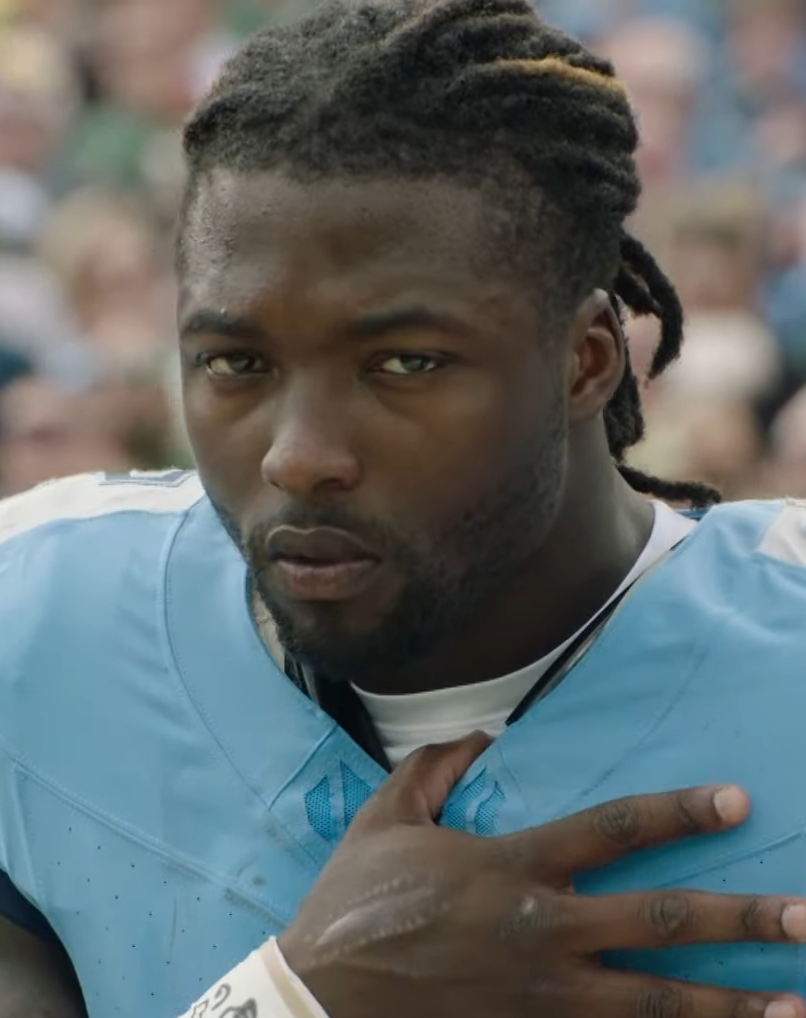
- Spears with the Tennessee Titans in 2024

No. 2 – Tennessee Titans
- Position: Running back
- Roster status: Injured reserve

Personal information
- Born: June 15, 2001 (age 25); Hammond, Louisiana, U.S.
- Listed height: 5 ft 11 in (1.80 m)
- Listed weight: 200 lb (91 kg)

Career information
- High school: Ponchatoula (Ponchatoula, Louisiana)
- College: Tulane (2019–2022)
- NFL draft: 2023: 3rd round, 81st overall pick

Career history
- Tennessee Titans (2023–present)

Awards and highlights
- AAC Offensive Player of the Year (2022); First-team All-AAC (2022)

Career NFL statistics as of 2025
- Rushing yards: 1,048
- Rushing average: 4.1
- Rushing touchdowns: 8
- Receptions: 127
- Receiving yards: 873
- Receiving touchdowns: 2
- Stats at Pro Football Reference

Tyjae Armon Spears (born June 15, 2001) is an American professional football running back for the Tennessee Titans of the National Football League (NFL). He played college football for the Tulane Green Wave.

== Early life ==
Spears grew up in Ponchatoula, Louisiana, and attended Ponchatoula High School. As a senior, he rushed for 920 yards and had 880 receiving yards with 18 total touchdowns. Spears was rated a three-star recruit and committed to play college football at Tulane University after considering an offer from Kansas State.

== College career ==
Spears rushed for 192 yards and one touchdown and caught five passes for 133 yards and one touchdown in four games during his freshman season at Tulane. He began his sophomore season as the Green Wave's starting running back and rushed 37 times for 274 yards and two touchdowns before suffering a season-ending injury in Week 3 and using a medical redshirt. As a redshirt sophomore, Spears gained 863 yards and scored nine touchdowns on 129 carries. He was named the American Athletic Conference Offensive Player of the Year as a redshirt junior. He was ranked the 6th best college football player nationwide among the "100 Best Players of the College Football Bowl Season 2022–2023" by College Football News.

== Professional career ==
Pre-draft measurables
Height	Weight	Arm length	Hand span	Wingspan	40-yard dash	10-yard split	20-yard split	20-yard shuttle	Three-cone drill	Vertical jump	Broad jump	Bench press
5 ft 9 5/8 in (1.77 m)	201 lb (91 kg)	30 3/4 in (0.78 m)	10 in (0.25 m)	6 ft 2 1/8 in (1.88 m)	4.54 s	1.57 s	2.57 s	4.32 s	7.27 s	39.0 in (0.99 m)	10 ft 5 in (3.18 m)	18 reps
All values from NFL Combine/Pro Day

Spears was selected by the Tennessee Titans in the third round, 81st overall, of the 2023 NFL draft. He shared a backfield that had Derrick Henry as the primary running back. In Week 5, against the Indianapolis Colts, he scored his first professional touchdown on a 19-yard rush. He finished his rookie season with 453 rushing yards and two touchdowns along with 52 catches for 385 yards and one touchdown.

Spears returned for the 2024 season, now sharing the backfield with newly signed Tony Pollard after Henry's departure. He was the only Titans player that season to record two touchdowns in two consecutive games during Week 15 and Week 16. He appeared in 12 games, missing parts of the season due to injury. He finished the season with 84 carries for 312 rushing yards and four rushing touchdowns, along with 30 receptions for 224 yards and a receiving touchdown.

Spears missed the first four games of the 2025 season due to an ankle injury. On October 4, 2025, Spears was activated off of the injured reserve list.

== NFL career statistics ==
=== Regular season ===
Year	Team	Games		Rushing					Receiving					Fumbles	
Year	Team	GP	GS	Att	Yds	Avg	Lng	TD	Rec	Yds	Avg	Lng	TD	Fum	Lost
2023	TEN	17	1	100	453	4.5	23	2	52	385	7.4	48	1	1	0
2024	TEN	12	1	84	312	3.7	23	4	30	224	7.5	43	1	1	0
2025	TEN	13	1	72	283	3.9	41	2	45	264	5.9	34	0	0	0
Career		42	3	256	1,048	4.1	41	8	127	873	6.9	48	2	2	0
