= Sincere Haynesworth =

American football player (born 2001)

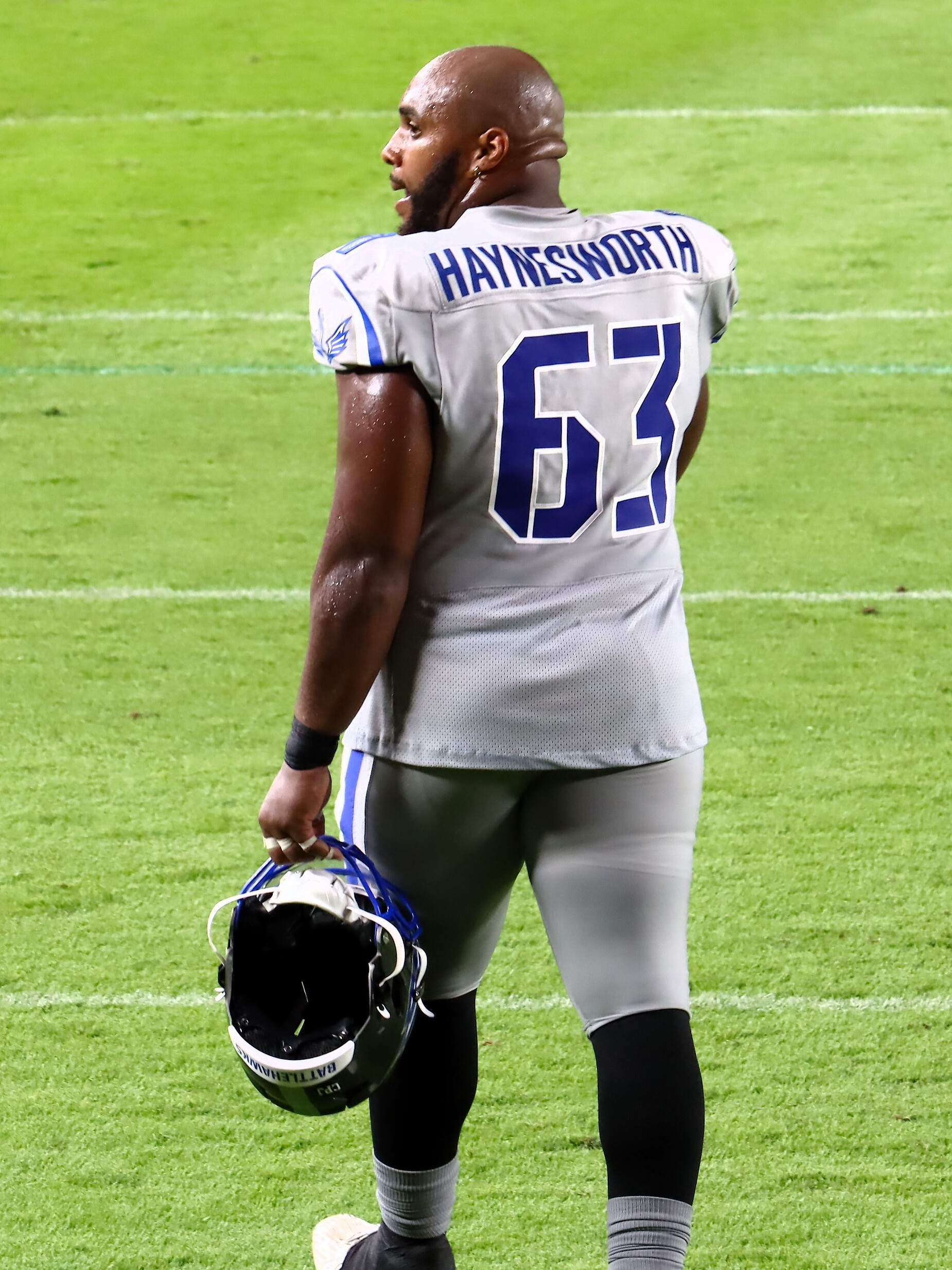
- Haynesworth with the St. Louis Battlehawks in 2026

Profile
- Position: Center

Personal information
- Born: April 13, 2001 (age 25); Buffalo, New York, U.S.
- Listed height: 6 ft 1 in (1.85 m)
- Listed weight: 300 lb (136 kg)

Career information
- High school: Pearland (Pearland, Texas)
- College: Tulane (2019–2023)
- NFL draft: 2024: undrafted

Career history
- New Orleans Saints (2024)*; New England Patriots (2024)*; New Orleans Saints (2024)*; Arizona Cardinals (2025)*; St. Louis Battlehawks (2026); Buffalo Bills (2026)*
- * Offseason or practice squad member only

Awards and highlights
- 2x First team All-AAC (2022, 2023); Second team All-AAC (2020)
- Stats at Pro Football Reference

Sincere Amaru Haynesworth (born April 13, 2001) is an American professional football center. He played college football for the Tulane Green Wave.

== Early life ==
Haynesworth attended high school at Pearland. Coming out of high school, Haynesworth was rated as a three-star recruit where he held offers from schools such as Tulane, Army, Navy, Louisiana Tech, North Texas, Arkansas State, and McNeese. Haynesworth ultimately decided to commit play college football for the Tulanes Green Wave.

== College career ==
In Haynesworth freshman season in 2019, he played in eleven games where he made five starts. After Haynesworth freshman season where he played offensive guard, he moved to center for the 2020 season. In the 2020 season, Haynesworth would play in and start all 12 games for Tulane, where for his performance he was named second team all Conference-American. In the 2021 season, Haynesworth would play in and start ten games for the Tulane Green Wave. During the 2022 season, Haynesworth played in and started all 14 games for the Green Wave. For his performance on the 2022 season, Haynesworth was named first-team all Conference-American. During the 2023 season, Haynesworth played in and started all 14 games for Tulane.

== Professional career ==
Pre-draft measurables
Height	Weight	Arm length	Hand span	Wingspan	40-yard dash	10-yard split	20-yard split	20-yard shuttle	Three-cone drill	Vertical jump	Broad jump	Bench press
6 ft 0 3/4 in (1.85 m)	300 lb (136 kg)	32 3/4 in (0.83 m)	10 in (0.25 m)	6 ft 8 1/8 in (2.04 m)	5.21 s	1.93 s	2.97 s	4.59 s	7.84 s	30 in (0.76 m)	8 ft 11 in (2.72 m)	21 reps
All values from Pro Day

=== New Orleans Saints ===
After going undrafted in the 2024 NFL draft, Haynesworth signed with the New Orleans Saints on April 27, 2024. He was also selected by the San Antonio Brahmas in the eighth round of the 2024 UFL draft on July 17. He was waived/injured on August 20, and reverted to injured reserve on August 22.

=== New England Patriots ===
On October 8, Haynesworth was signed to the New England Patriots practice squad. He was released on October 15.

=== New Orleans Saints (second stint) ===
On October 23, 2024, Haynesworth was signed to the New Orleans Saints' practice squad, but was released a week later. Haynesworth was re–signed to the team's practice squad again on December 3.

=== Arizona Cardinals ===
On January 7, 2025, Haynesworth signed a reserve/future contract with the Arizona Cardinals. He was waived on August 26 as part of final roster cuts and re-signed to the practice squad the next day, and released the following day.

=== St. Louis Battlehawks ===
On January 23, 2026, Haynesworth signed with the St. Louis Battlehawks of the United Football League (UFL).

=== Buffalo Bills ===
On August 26, 2026, Haynesworth signed with the Buffalo Bills. He was waived by the Bills three days later as a part of preliminary roster cuts.
