= Macon Clark =

American football player (born 1999)

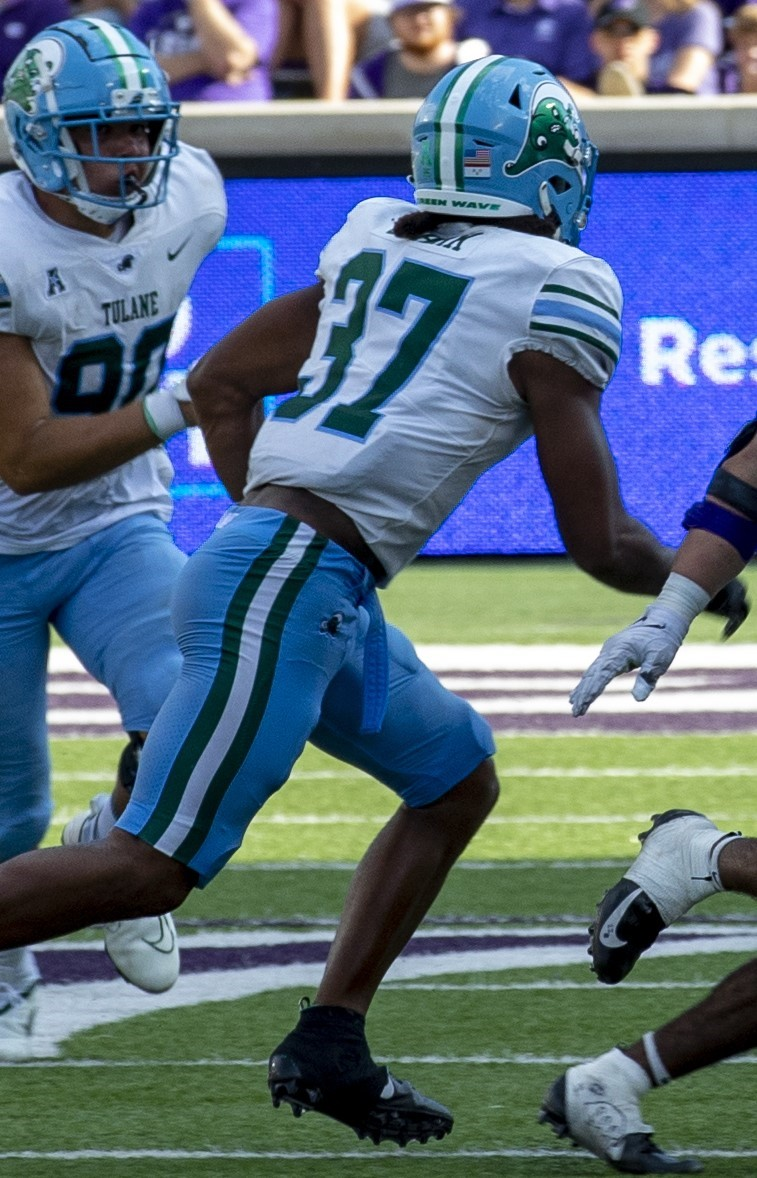
- Clark (#37) with Tulane in 2022

Profile
- Position: Safety

Personal information
- Born: July 21, 1999 (age 27); Saint Rose, Louisiana, U.S.
- Listed height: 5 ft 11 in (1.80 m)
- Listed weight: 203 lb (92 kg)

Career information
- High school: Destrehan (Destrehan, Louisiana)
- College: Tulane (2018–2022)
- NFL draft: 2023: undrafted

Career history
- Chicago Bears (2023)*; Montreal Alouettes (2024)
- * Offseason or practice squad member only

Awards and highlights
- First team All-AAC (2022)
- Stats at Pro Football Reference

Macon Clark (born July 21, 1999) is an American football safety. He played college football at Tulane.

== Early life ==
Clark grew up in St. Rose, Louisiana and attended Destrehan High School. He was rated a three-star recruit and committed to play college football at Tulane over offers from Louisiana, Nicholls State, Texas State and Troy.

== College career ==
During Clark's true freshman season in 2018, he made appearances in 12 games and finished the season by completing five solo tackles. During the 2019 season, he appeared in eight games and finished the season with 14 total tackles, nine solo tackles and a touchdown. During the 2020 season, he appeared in all 12 games and started eight of them. He finished the season with 43 total tackles, 6.5 tackles for a loss of 26 yards, four sacks for a loss of 17 yards, one forced fumble, one fumble recovery, two interceptions and four pass breakups. During the 2020 Famous Idaho Potato Bowl against Nevada, he made a career high 2.0 tackles for loss and 1.0 sacks. During the 2021 season, he played and started in all 12 games and finished the season with 56 solo tackles, 74 total tackles, 4.0 tackles for loss of 24 yards, and one sack for a loss of 12 yards. By the end of the season, he was named on the Phil Steele All-American Athletic Conference Third Team. During the 2022 season, he made appearances in all 14 games and finished the season with 54 solo tackles, 68 total tackles, eight tackles for a loss of 19 yards, two interceptions, three forced fumbles and one fumble recovery.

== Professional career ==
Pre-draft measurables
Height	Weight	Arm length	Hand span	40-yard dash	10-yard split	20-yard split	20-yard shuttle	Three-cone drill	Vertical jump	Broad jump
6 ft 0 in (1.83 m)	203 lb (92 kg)	31 1/2 in (0.80 m)	9 3/8 in (0.24 m)	4.62 s	1.52 s	2.64 s	4.19 s	6.94 s	35 in (0.89 m)	9 ft 7 in (2.92 m)
All values from NFL Combine/Pro Day

=== Chicago Bears ===
On April 29, 2023, Clark was signed to the Chicago Bears as an undrafted free agent after going unselected in the 2023 NFL draft. He was waived on August 29, 2023 and later re-signed to the practice squad. He was released on October 4.

=== Montreal Alouettes ===
On March 6, 2024, Clark was signed to the Montreal Alouettes of the Canadian Football League (CFL).
