= Patrick Jenkins (American football) =

American football player (born 2001)

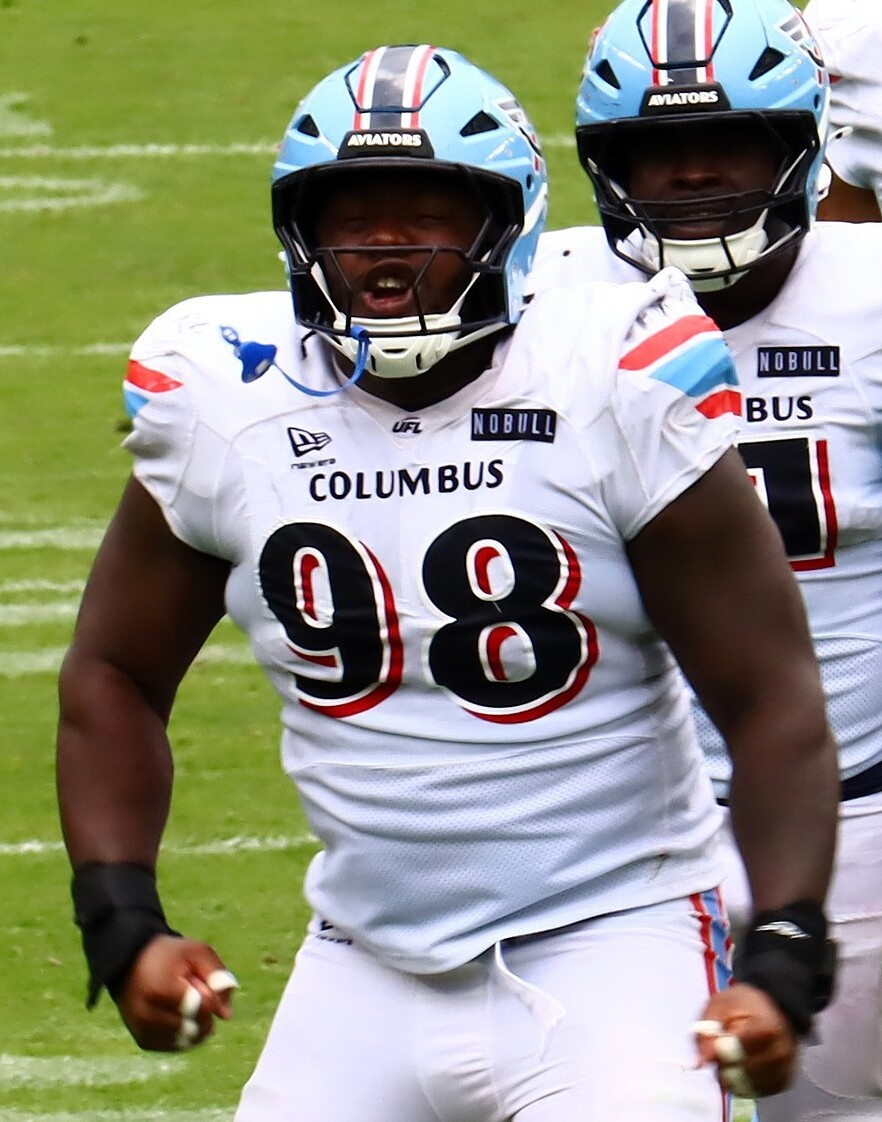
- Jenkins in 2026

Profile
- Position: Defensive tackle

Personal information
- Born: August 20, 2003 (age 23); New Orleans, Louisiana, U.S.
- Listed height: 6 ft 2 in (1.88 m)
- Listed weight: 287 lb (130 kg)

Career information
- High school: John Ehret (Marrero, Louisiana)
- College: TCU (2020–2021); Tulane (2022–2024)
- NFL draft: 2025: undrafted

Career history
- Arizona Cardinals (2025)*; Atlanta Falcons (2025)*; DC Defenders (2026)*; Columbus Aviators (2026); New York Jets (2026)*; Cleveland Browns (2026)*
- * Offseason or practice squad member only

Awards and highlights
- 2× First-team All-AAC (2023, 2024); Second-team All-AAC (2022)

Patrick Jenkins (born August 20, 2003) is an American professional football defensive tackle. He played college football for the TCU Horned Frogs and Tulane Green Wave.

== Early life ==
Jenkins attended John Ehret High School in Marrero, Louisiana. As a junior, he notched 17 tackles for a loss and 15 sacks, while being named the 8-5A Defensive MVP as an all-district defensive lineman. After his senior season, Jenkins accepted an invite to play in the All-American Bowl.

=== Recruiting ===
Coming out of high school, Jenkins was rated as a four-star recruit and initially committed to play college football for the LSU Tigers over offers from schools such as TCU, Arkansas, Miami, Missouri, Tennessee, and Texas A&M. He later flipped his commitment to play for the TCU Horned Frogs.

== College career ==
=== TCU ===
During his first two seasons in 2020 and 2021, Jenkins appeared in 18 games where he notched 27 tackles with five being for a loss, and a sack for the Horned Frogs. After the 2021 season, Jenkins entered his name into the NCAA transfer portal.

=== Tulane ===
Jenkins transferred to play for the Tulane Green Wave. In the 2023 Cotton Bowl Classic, he recorded a safety as he helped Tulane to a win. In 2022, Jenkins totaled 39 tackles with nine being for a loss, and three sacks, earning second-team all-American Athletic Conference (AAC) honors. In the 2023 season, he tallied 35 tackles with 11.5 being for a loss, five and a half sacks, and was named first-team all AAC for his performance.

== Professional career ==
Pre-draft measurables
Height	Weight	Arm length	Hand span	40-yard dash	10-yard split	20-yard split	20-yard shuttle	Three-cone drill	Vertical jump	Broad jump	Bench press
6 ft 1 3/4 in (1.87 m)	287 lb (130 kg)	32 in (0.81 m)	9 7/8 in (0.25 m)	4.93 s	1.73 s	2.81 s	4.73 s	7.58 s	30.5 in (0.77 m)	9 ft 3 in (2.82 m)	30 reps
All values from Pro Day

=== Arizona Cardinals ===
After going unselected in the 2025 NFL draft, Jenkins signed with the Arizona Cardinals on May 27, 2025 as an undrafted free agent. He was waived on August 25.

=== Atlanta Falcons ===
On December 31, 2025, Jenkins signed with the Atlanta Falcons' practice squad.

=== DC Defenders ===
On January 14, 2026, Jenkins was selected by the DC Defenders of the United Football League (UFL).

=== Columbus Aviators ===
On February 10, 2026, Jenkins was traded to the Columbus Aviators in exchange for TE Briley Moore.

=== New York Jets ===
On August 5, 2026, Jenkins signed with the New York Jets, but was waived the next day.

=== Cleveland Browns ===
On August 7, 2026, Jenkins was claimed off waivers by the Cleveland Browns. On August 28, Jenkins was waived by the Browns.
