= Jarius Monroe =

American football player (born 2000)

Profile
- Position: Safety

Personal information
- Born: October 6, 2000 (age 26); LaPlace, Louisiana, U.S.
- Listed height: 6 ft 2 in (1.88 m)
- Listed weight: 205 lb (93 kg)

Career information
- High school: East St. John (Reserve, Louisiana)
- College: Nicholls (2019–2021); Tulane (2022–2023)
- NFL draft: 2024: undrafted

Career history
- New York Jets (2024–2025)

Awards and highlights
- 2x First team All-AAC (2022, 2023); First team All-Southland (2021)

Career NFL statistics as of Week 10, 2025
- Total tackles: 6
- Stats at Pro Football Reference

Jarius Monroe (born October 6, 2000) is an American professional football safety. He played college football for the Nicholls Colonels and Tulane Green Wave.

== Early life ==
Monroe attended East St. John High School. He was rated as a three-star recruit and committed to play college football for the Nicholls Colonels.

== College career ==
=== Nicholls ===
In Monroe's career with Nicholls, he was a three-year starter where he totaled 102 tackles, 28 pass deflections, and an interception. After the 2021 season, he entered the NCAA transfer portal.

=== Tulane ===
Monroe transferred to play for the Tulane Green Wave. In the 2022 season opener, he recorded his first interception with Tulane in a win over UMass. In the 2023 Cotton Bowl Classic, Monroe intercepted Heisman-winning quarterback Caleb Williams as he helped Tulane upset USC. He finished the year with 49 tackles, eight pass deflections, and three interceptions, earning first-team all-American Athletic Conference (AAC) honors. In 2023, Monroe had 48 tackles, three sacks, ten pass deflections, three interceptions, and a forced fumble, once again earning first-team all-AAC honors. He was invited to participate in the 2024 East-West Shrine Bowl, where he was named the game's Defensive MVP.

== Professional career ==
Pre-draft measurables
Height	Weight	Arm length	Hand span	Wingspan	40-yard dash	10-yard split	20-yard split	20-yard shuttle	Three-cone drill	Vertical jump	Bench press
6 ft 0 5/8 in (1.84 m)	201 lb (91 kg)	32 1/4 in (0.82 m)	9 in (0.23 m)	6 ft 5 1/2 in (1.97 m)	4.68 s	1.62 s	2.69 s	4.32 s	7.30 s	33.0 in (0.84 m)	9 reps
All values from Pro Day

Monroe signed with the New York Jets as an undrafted free agent on May 3, 2024. He was waived on August 27, and re-signed to the practice squad. Monroe was promoted to the active roster on December 24.

On August 26, 2025, Monroe was waived with an injury settlement by the Jets as part of final roster cuts. He was re-signed to the Jets practice squad on November 5. On November 13, Monroe was elevated to the active roster, making his season debut in the team's Week 11 loss to the New England Patriots. On December 16, Monroe was signed to New York's active roster.

On August 30, 2026, Monroe was waived by the Jets as a part of final roster cuts.
