= Houston–SMU rivalry =

American college sports rivalry

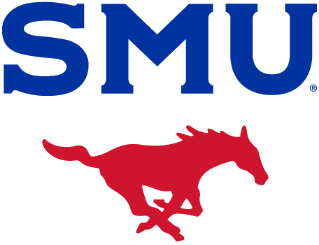
- Houston Cougars SMU Mustangs

Locations of Houston and SMU

The Houston–SMU rivalry is a college rivalry between the University of Houston Cougars and Southern Methodist University Mustangs. When Houston joined the Southwest Conference in 1972, the two schools were conference mates until the conference dissolved in 1996. After a brief hiatus, SMU would join Conference USA in 2005 and the rivalry would continue when both schools moved to the American Athletic Conference in 2013 during the midst of 2010–2014 NCAA conference realignment, where it intensified as they were they only two schools from Texas in the conference. Later, with the two schools moving to separate conferences during the 2020s conference realignment — Houston to the Big 12 Conference in 2023 and SMU to the Atlantic Coast Conference in 2024 — the future of the rivalry was put in doubt.

== Football ==
Houston–SMU football rivalry
- Sport: Football
- Teams: Houston Cougars; SMU Mustangs
- First meeting: September 27, 1975; SMU 27, Houston 16
- Latest meeting: November 5, 2022; SMU 77, Houston 63
- Next meeting: TBD

Statistics
- Total meetings: 37
- All-time series: Houston leads, 22–14–1
- Largest victory: Houston: 95–21 (1989); SMU: 72–42 (2012)
- Longest win streak: Houston: 6 (2006–2011)
- Current win streak: SMU: 1 (2022–present)

Football Comparison
	Houston	SMU
First Season	1946	1915
National Championships	0	3
New Year's Six wins	1	0
Playoff Appearances	0	1
Bowl Appearances	30	21
Bowl Wins	13	7
Conference Championships	11	12
Heisman Winners	1	1

=== Series history ===
The first game took place on September 27, 1975, in Houston, Texas, and the two schools played each other with few interruptions until Houston departed for the Big 12 in 2023. As of the end of the 2024 season, Houston leads the series 22–14–1.

==== Notable games ====
November 26, 1983: The Mirage Bowl (in Tokyo, Japan) was the longest road trip for both teams in their history. A crowd of 70,000 watched as Lance McIlhenny led the Mustangs with two touchdown passes and along with the mistakes of the Cougars, helped SMU take a 34–12 victory.

October 20, 1984: No. 6 SMU entered the game undefeated at 4–0 and looking for an easy win against the 3–2 Cougars. However, Houston would pull off the upset, handing the Mustangs an unlikely 29–20 loss and denying them a spot in the Cotton Bowl.

October 21, 1989: SMU was playing in its first season back from the death penalty while Houston was coming off of a strong 9–3 campaign in 1988. However, Houston was hit with a two year bowl ban starting in 1989 for recruiting violations, so the Cougars were out for blood during the regular season. Eventual Heisman Trophy winner Andre Ware would throw for 517 yards, only playing in the first half. The Cougars would break a number of NCAA records, embarrassing the sanction-weakened Mustangs 95–21.

November 19, 2011: In Houston's last home conference game of the season, they were selected to host College GameDay by ESPN in what would be the first ever appearance on the program for both schools. Houston entered the week 10–0 and ranked No. 10/11 in the AP Poll and BCS while SMU were 6–4, having lost the week prior at home to Navy. During the broadcast, Olympic gold medalist and former Houston track & field star Carl Lewis was the guest picker and Lee Corso put on Shasta's headgear to indicate he predicted Houston to win the game. Led by star quarterback Case Keenum, Houston would cruise to a 37–7 victory.

October 22, 2016: The 2016 Houston team was picked by many experts to obtain the Group of Five's New Year's Six bowl bid, having only one close loss to Navy earlier in the season. However, the No. 11-ranked Cougars were upset by SMU 38–16, dropping them out of the AP Poll the following week. It was the Mustangs' first win over a ranked team since 2011.

October 30, 2021: The 2021 match-up between the two schools would prove to be season changing. SMU entered the game ranked No. 19 in the AP Poll and undefeated at 7–0, while Houston had a 6–1 record, with their only loss coming in their first game of the season against Texas Tech. In the first quarter, Houston would take a 17–0 lead, fueled by two Clayton Tune touchdown passes to Nathaniel Dell. In the second and third quarters, SMU fought back and took a 34–30 lead. Houston reclaimed the lead early in the 4th quarter when Tune threw a short touchdown pass to KeSean Carter. The Mustangs tied the game 37–37 with 30 seconds remaining after a 46-yard field goal from Blake Mazza, but during the ensuing kickoff, Marcus Jones returned the ball 100 yards to win the game and pull off the upset. The Cougars would go on to make the conference championship game (their only other loss that season) and finish with a 12–2 record and ranked No. 17 on the AP Poll, while SMU lost three of their remaining four games to end the season at 8–4.

November 5, 2022: In what would prove to be their last match-up as members of The American, Houston entered the season as favorites to win the conference, but had slumped to a 5–3 record while SMU were 4–4 under new coach Rhett Lashlee. The game would prove to be a high-scoring affair with a scoreline more common in basketball as SMU won 77–63. The combined 140 points broke the record for most points scored between two teams in an FBS football game in regulation, set six years earlier when Pittsburgh beat Syracuse 76–61. Every point scored between both teams was a touchdown followed by an extra point, with SMU scoring on each of their first nine drives.

=== Game results ===
Rankings are from the AP Poll released prior to the game.

Houston victories	SMU victories	Tie games

No.	Date	Location	Winning team		Losing team	
1	September 27, 1975	Houston, TX	SMU	27	Houston	16
2	October 16, 1976	Dallas, TX	#19 Houston	29	SMU	6
3	October 15, 1977	Houston, TX	SMU	37	#19 Houston	23
4	October 21, 1978	Dallas, TX	#11 Houston	42	SMU	28
5	October 20, 1979	Houston, TX	#5 Houston	37	SMU	10
6	October 18, 1980	Irving, TX	Houston	13	SMU	11
7	October 17, 1981	Houston, TX	#10 SMU	38	Houston	22
8	October 16, 1982	Irving, TX	#5 SMU	20	Houston	14
9	November 26, 1983^{A}	Tokyo, Japan	#6 SMU	34	Houston	12
10	October 20, 1984	Irving, TX	Houston	29	#6 SMU	20
11	October 19, 1985	Houston, TX	SMU	37	Houston	13
12	October 18, 1986	Irving, TX	#20 SMU	10	Houston	3
13	October 21, 1989	Houston, TX	#16 Houston	95	SMU	21
14	October 20, 1990	University Park, TX	#9 Houston	44	SMU	17
15	October 19, 1991	Houston, TX	Houston	49	SMU	20
16	November 7, 1992	University Park, TX	SMU	41	Houston	16
17	October 16, 1993	Houston, TX	Tie	28	Tie	28
18	October 15, 1994	University Park, TX	Houston	39	SMU	33
19	October 21, 1995	Houston, TX	Houston	38	SMU	15

No.	Date	Location	Winning team		Losing team	
20	September 30, 2000	Houston, TX	Houston	17	SMU	15
21	November 19, 2005	Houston, TX	SMU	29	Houston	24
22	November 11, 2006	University Park, TX	Houston	37	SMU	27
23	November 4, 2007	Houston, TX	Houston	38	SMU	28
24	October 18, 2008	University Park, TX	Houston	44	SMU	38
25	October 24, 2009	Houston, TX	#17 Houston	38	SMU	15
26	October 23, 2010	University Park, TX	Houston	45	SMU	20
27	November 19, 2011	Houston, TX	#11 Houston	37	SMU	7
28	October 18, 2012	University Park, TX	SMU	72	Houston	42
29	November 29, 2013	Houston, TX	Houston	34	SMU	0
30	November 28, 2014	University Park, TX	Houston	35	SMU	9
31	October 8, 2015	Houston, TX	Houston	49	SMU	28
32	October 22, 2016	University Park, TX	SMU	38	#11 Houston	16
33	October 7, 2017	Houston, TX	Houston	35	SMU	22
34	November 3, 2018	University Park, TX	SMU	45	#17 Houston	31
35	October 24, 2019	Houston, TX	#16 SMU	34	Houston	31
36	October 30, 2021	Houston, TX	Houston	44	#19 SMU	37
37	November 5, 2022^{B}	University Park, TX	SMU	77	Houston	63
Series: Houston leads 22–14–1

==== Notes ====
^{A} 1983 Mirage Bowl
^{B} 2022 Houston vs. SMU football game

== Men's basketball ==
Houston–SMU men's basketball rivalry
- Sport: Basketball
- Teams: Houston Cougars; SMU Mustangs
- First meeting: March 16, 1956; SMU 89 – Houston 74
- Latest meeting: February 16, 2023; Houston 80 – SMU 65
- Next meeting: TBD

Statistics
- Total meetings: 92
- All-time series: Houston leads, 58–34
- Largest victory: Houston, 95–55 (February 13, 1978)
- Longest win streak: Houston, 9 (February 11, 2006–February 13, 2010)
- Current win streak: Houston, 3 (February 27, 2022–present)

=== Series history ===
Men's Basketball Comparison
	Houston	SMU
First Season	1945–46	1916–17
NCAA Final Fours	7	1
NCAA Tournament Appearances	27	13
Conference Championships	13	16
Conference Tournament Championships	9	3
Consensus All-Americans	8	2
Conference Player of the Year	7	11

Houston and SMU would meet three times in the NCAA Tournament before playing in a regular season game, first in 1972. Throughout their shared time in the Southwest Conference, the Cougars and Mustangs would meet seven times in the Southwest Conference men's basketball tournament, with SMU leading 4–3 in their meetings then. The teams have also been conference mates in Conference USA and the American Athletic Conference, meeting once each in the tournaments for each conference. As of the end of the 2024–25 season, Houston leads the all-time series 58–34.

==== Notable games ====
March 16, 1956: In the teams' first ever meeting, they first played at Allen Fieldhouse in the 1956 NCAA Sweet Sixteen. All-American Jim Krebs would score 27 points to lead the No. 7 Mustangs to victory 89–74 and an eventual Final Four.

March 13, 1965: In the teams' second meeting, Houston and SMU met to play in the 1965 NCAA Regional third place Game. Behind 27 points from Carroll Hooser, the Mustangs would again pull out a win against the Cougars, 89–87.

March 18, 1967: In their third meeting in the NCAA Tournament, a Final Four was on the line as the teams met in the 1967 NCAA Elite Eight. This time, fortune would favor the Cougars. Led by 31 points from Elvin Hayes, Houston would gain their first series win by a score of 83–75.

January 16, 1982: In the first year of Phi Slama Jama, SMU visited No. 10 Houston and upset the Cougars 67–66. Houston would go onto the 1982 Final Four, while SMU finished with a 6–21 record on the season.

March 12, 1983: After beating the Mustangs twice in the regular season, Houston would meet SMU once again in the 1983 Southwest Conference tournament semifinals. Houston would maintain their winning streak against SMU, prevailing 75–59. Houston would go on to win the conference tournament and make an NCAA run before finally losing to NC State in the 1983 NCAA Finals.

March 3, 1985: With the days of Phi Slama Jama behind them, the tables turned in favor of SMU with the Mustangs beating No. 11 Oklahoma and No. 5 North Carolina during the 1984–85 season. The No. 13 Mustangs headed to Houston for their final regular season game, only to be handed a 79–76 upset loss.

February 1, 2016: No. 12 SMU seemed to be heading in the right direction under the leadership of coach Larry Brown, visiting the Cougars with a 19–1 record on the season and having already beaten them earlier in the year. Coach Kelvin Sampson would earn his first win against SMU, when the Cougars pulled the upset to win 71–68. It was the Cougars' biggest victory since January 1996, when they defeated No. 3 Memphis.

=== Game results ===
Rankings are from the AP Poll released prior to the game.

Houston victories	SMU victories

No.	Date	Location	Winner	Score
1	March 16, 1956^{A}	Lawrence, KS	#7 SMU	89–74
2	March 13, 1965^{B}	Manhattan, KS	SMU	89–87
3	March 18, 1967^{C}	Lawrence, KS	#7 Houston	83–75
4	December 29, 1972	El Paso, TX	#13 Houston	115–102
5	January 26, 1976	University Park, TX	SMU	87–75
6	February 24, 1976	Houston, TX	Houston	100–98
7	January 29, 1977	University Park, TX	Houston	103–102
8	February 10, 1977	Houston, TX	Houston	115–83
9	January 23, 1978	University Park, TX	SMU	76–75
10	February 13, 1978	Houston, TX	Houston	95–55
11	January 22, 1979	Houston, TX	Houston	82–78
12	February 12, 1979	University Park, TX	Houston	101–94
13	February 24, 1979^{D}	Houston, TX	Houston	74–67
14	January 12, 1980	Houston, TX	Houston	96–81
15	February 2, 1980	University Park, TX	Houston	71–70
16	January 13, 1981	University Park, TX	SMU	72–70 ^{3OT}
17	February 3, 1981	Houston, TX	Houston	79–64
18	January 16, 1982	Houston, TX	SMU	67–66
19	February 6, 1982	University Park, TX	Houston	73–71 ^{OT}
20	January 8, 1983	Houston, TX	#19 Houston	105–71
21	February 9, 1983	University Park, TX	#6 Houston	85–68
22	March 12, 1983^{E}	Dallas, TX	#1 Houston	75–59
23	January 4, 1984	University Park, TX	#7 Houston	60–59
24	February 4, 1984	Houston, TX	#6 Houston	76–57
25	January 30, 1985	University Park, TX	#4 SMU	85–78
26	March 3, 1985	Houston, TX	Houston	79–76
27	March 8, 1985^{F}	Dallas, TX	#20 SMU	84–72
28	January 25, 1986	Houston, TX	Houston	71–66
29	February 26, 1986	University Park, TX	SMU	78–71
30	January 21, 1987	University Park, TX	Houston	75–65
31	February 22, 1987	Houston, TX	SMU	79–73
32	January 19, 1988	Houston, TX	SMU	69–65
33	February 20, 1988	University Park, TX	SMU	87–84
34	March 12, 1988^{G}	Dallas, TX	SMU	98–76
35	January 21, 1989	University Park, TX	Houston	84–83 ^{OT}
36	February 22, 1989	Houston, TX	SMU	88–85
37	January 24, 1990	Houston, TX	Houston	64–47
38	February 24, 1990	University Park, TX	Houston	71–63
39	January 26, 1991	University Park, TX	SMU	81–75
40	February 27, 1991	Houston, TX	Houston	85–58
41	March 8, 1991^{H}	Dallas, TX	SMU	65–62
42	February 5, 1992	Houston, TX	Houston	67–50
43	March 7, 1992	University Park, TX	Houston	69–62
44	March 13, 1992^{I}	Dallas, TX	Houston	73–62
45	January 23, 1993	Houston, TX	Houston	85–75
46	January 30, 1993	University Park, TX	SMU	70–60
47	January 26, 1994	University Park, TX	SMU	70–64

No.	Date	Location	Winner	Score
48	February 24, 1994	Houston, TX	Houston	89–80
49	January 28, 1995	University Park, TX	Houston	73–71
50	March 4, 1995	Houston, TX	SMU	79–74
51	January 8, 1996	Houston, TX	Houston	63–62
52	February 28, 1996	University Park, TX	Houston	62–59
53	March 7, 1996^{J}	Dallas, TX	SMU	62–57
54	November 27, 1999	Houston, TX	SMU	94–80
55	December 17, 2000	University Park, TX	SMU	94–69
56	February 11, 2006	Houston, TX	Houston	69–57
57	January 13, 2007	Houston, TX	Houston	82–67
58	February 7, 2007	University Park, TX	Houston	64–49
59	January 16, 2008	University Park, TX	Houston	99–71
60	February 16, 2008	Houston, TX	Houston	69–47
61	February 11, 2009	University Park, TX	Houston	69–56
62	March 7, 2009	Houston, TX	Houston	89–77
63	March 11, 2009^{K}	Memphis, TN	Houston	85–76
64	February 13, 2010	Houston, TX	Houston	66–60
65	February 27, 2010	University Park, TX	SMU	94–83
66	January 15, 2011	University Park, TX	Houston	70–68
67	February 16, 2011	Houston, TX	SMU	65–51
68	January 18, 2012	University Park, TX	SMU	70–54
69	February 25, 2012	Houston, TX	Houston	62–59
70	January 9, 2013	Houston, TX	Houston	78–67
71	February 2, 2013	University Park, TX	Houston	84–80 ^{OT}
72	January 26, 2014	Houston, TX	SMU	75–68
73	February 19, 2014	University Park, TX	SMU	68–64
74	March 13, 2014^{L}	Memphis, TN	Houston	68–64
75	January 24, 2015	University Park, TX	SMU	80–59
76	February 12, 2015	Houston, TX	#25 SMU	75–69
77	January 19, 2016	University Park, TX	#8 SMU	77–73
78	February 1, 2016	Houston, TX	Houston	71–68
79	January 21, 2017	University Park, TX	SMU	85–64
80	February 18, 2017	Houston, TX	#19 SMU	76–66
81	February 8, 2018	Houston, TX	Houston	67–58
82	February 28, 2018	University Park, TX	#25 Houston	69–56
83	January 16, 2019	University Park, TX	#21 Houston	69–58
84	March 7, 2019	Houston, TX	#12 Houston	90–79
85	January 15, 2020	Houston, TX	Houston	71–62
86	February 15, 2020	University Park, TX	SMU	73–72 ^{OT}
87	January 3, 2021	University Park, TX	#5 Houston	74–60
88	January 31, 2021	Houston, TX	#6 Houston	70–48
89	February 9, 2022	University Park, TX	SMU	85–83
90	February 27, 2022	Houston, TX	#14 Houston	75–61
91	January 5, 2023	Houston, TX	#2 Houston	87–53
92	February 16, 2023	University Park, TX	#2 Houston	80–65
Series: Houston leads 58–34

==== Notes ====
^{A} 1956 NCAA basketball tournament
^{B} 1965 NCAA University Division basketball tournament
^{C} 1967 NCAA University Division basketball tournament
^{D} 1979 Southwest Conference men's basketball tournament
^{E} 1983 Southwest Conference men's basketball tournament
^{F} 1985 Southwest Conference men's basketball tournament
^{G} 1988 Southwest Conference men's basketball tournament
^{H} 1991 Southwest Conference men's basketball tournament
^{I} 1992 Southwest Conference men's basketball tournament
^{J} 1996 Southwest Conference men's basketball tournament
^{K} 2009 Conference USA men's basketball tournament
^{L} 2014 American Athletic Conference men's basketball tournament

== See also ==
- List of NCAA college football rivalry games
- Cowboys–Texans rivalry
