= Pittsburgh–Syracuse football rivalry =

American college football rivalry

- Pittsburgh Panthers Syracuse Orange
- First meeting: October 21, 1916; Pittsburgh, 30–0
- Latest meeting: September 17, 2026; Pittsburgh, 27–13
- Next meeting: 2027

Statistics
- Total meetings: 82
- All-time series: Pittsburgh leads, 46–32–3
- Largest victory: Syracuse, 55–7 (1996)
- Longest win streak: Pittsburgh, 11 (1973–1983); Syracuse, 11 (1991–2001)
- Current win streak: Pittsburgh, 3 (2024–present)

Locations of Pittsburgh and Syracuse

The Pittsburgh–Syracuse football rivalry is an American college football rivalry between the Pittsburgh Panthers and Syracuse Orange. It began in 1916 and has been played every year since 1955. The Panthers and Orange were both Eastern football independents for most of their history but have shared the same football conference since 1991 when the Big East Football Conference was formed from Eastern football independents. Pitt is the most played opponent for Syracuse and Syracuse is the third most played opponent for Pitt. Sharing membership in the Atlantic Coast Conference (ACC) since 2013, the Panthers and Orange were designated cross-divisional opponents. Beginning in 2023, the ACC eliminated the Atlantic and Coastal divisions, going to one division. The Panthers and Orange were designated primary opponents, ensuring they will meet annually. They have played a total of 82 times, with Pittsburgh leading the series 46–32–3. (Note: Syracuse vacated 11 football victories from the 2004 to 2006 seasons due to an athletic scandal. These wins are not included in Syracuse's all-time record, and consequently the 2004 Syracuse victory against Pittsburgh is not included in the series record between the two teams.)

== History ==
=== Series record ===
From 1916–56, Pittsburgh led 8–2–2, but Syracuse went 11–5 to tie the series up. Pittsburgh then went on an 11-year winning streak from 1973–83. However, Syracuse went 16–1–1 from 1984–2001 to take the series lead (29–25–3). Pittsburgh has gone 20–3 since to retake the lead.

The teams played the first-ever collegiate football game at the original Yankee Stadium in 1923 and marked the 100th anniversary of the game by replaying at the new Yankee Stadium on November 11, 2023.

=== Big East Conference (1991–2012) ===
Syracuse was a charter member of the Big East Conference, founded as a basketball prioritized conference in 1979 that did not sponsor football. Pitt joined Syracuse as a member of the Big East Conference in 1982. Both Pitt and Syracuse moved their football teams, both playing as Independents, into the Big East Football Conference in 1991 when they and other football-playing members of the Big East, along with additional Eastern independent teams, decided to form a football conference under the auspices of the existing Big East Conference.

Since 1991, Pittsburgh and Syracuse have played twenty-two times while in the Big East until trouble started to rumble through the conference starting in 2005 with the "football" and "non-football" schools of the conference, led to instability in the conference. Several schools left the conference for the Atlantic Coast Conference. The Big East became more unstable starting in 2011 when Pittsburgh and Syracuse submitted formal applications to join the ACC, which were accepted on September 18, 2011.

=== Atlantic Coast Conference (2013–present) ===
Pittsburgh and Syracuse officially joined the ACC on July 1, 2013.

Pittsburgh is placed in the Coastal division of the ACC and Syracuse is in the Atlantic division. The teams of the ACC have a permanent inter-divisional opponent, where a team from the Atlantic and Coastal divisions will play annually which was added for traditional rivalries like the North Carolina–NC State football rivalry to continue annually despite not being in the same division. When Pittsburgh and Syracuse joined the conference they were made each other's permanent inter-divisional opponent.

The 2016 matchup between the two teams aired on Pittsburgh ABC affiliate WTAE-TV's main signal, while the one between Michigan and Ohio State aired on ESPN2 and on the This TV digital subchannel the station had at the time.

In 2023, after additions of California, SMU, and Stanford, the ACC announced a new scheduling format, which eliminated divisions and protects 16 annual matchups. Pittsburgh–Syracuse was retained from the previous scheduling model as a protected rivalry.

== Game results ==
| Pittsburgh victories | Syracuse victories | Vacated wins |

| No. | Date | Location | Winning team | | Losing team | |
|---|---|---|---|---|---|---|
| 1 | October 21, 1916 | Syracuse, NY | Pittsburgh | 30 | Syracuse | 0 |
| 2 | October 20, 1917 | Pittsburgh, PA | Pittsburgh | 28 | Syracuse | 0 |
| 3 | October 18, 1919 | Syracuse, NY | Syracuse | 24 | Pittsburgh | 3 |
| 4 | October 16, 1920 | Syracuse, NY | Tie | 7 | Tie | 7 |
| 5 | October 22, 1921 | Pittsburgh, PA | Pittsburgh | 35 | Syracuse | 0 |
| 6 | October 21, 1922 | Syracuse, NY | Pittsburgh | 21 | Syracuse | 14 |
| 7 | October 20, 1923 | Bronx, NY | Syracuse | 3 | Pittsburgh | 0 |
| 8 | November 1, 1924 | Syracuse, NY | Tie | 7 | Tie | 7 |
| 9 | November 3, 1928 | Pittsburgh, PA | Pittsburgh | 18 | Syracuse | 0 |
| 10 | October 18, 1930 | Syracuse, NY | Pittsburgh | 14 | Syracuse | 0 |
| 11 | September 24, 1955 | Syracuse, NY | #7 Pittsburgh | 22 | Syracuse | 12 |
| 12 | September 29, 1956 | Pittsburgh, PA | #10 Pittsburgh | 14 | #7 Syracuse | 7 |
| 13 | November 2, 1957 | Pittsburgh, PA | Syracuse | 24 | Pittsburgh | 21 |
| 14 | November 1, 1958 | Syracuse, NY | Syracuse | 16 | #12 Pittsburgh | 13 |
| 15 | October 31, 1959 | Pittsburgh, PA | #5 Syracuse | 35 | Pittsburgh | 0 |
| 16 | October 29, 1960 | Syracuse, NY | Pittsburgh | 10 | #3 Syracuse | 0 |
| 17 | November 4, 1961 | Syracuse, NY | Syracuse | 28 | Pittsburgh | 9 |
| 18 | November 3, 1962 | Pittsburgh, PA | Pittsburgh | 24 | Syracuse | 6 |
| 19 | November 2, 1963 | Pittsburgh, PA | #10 Pittsburgh | 35 | Syracuse | 27 |
| 20 | October 31, 1964 | Syracuse, NY | Syracuse | 21 | Pittsburgh | 6 |
| 21 | October 30, 1965 | Flushing, NY | Syracuse | 51 | Pittsburgh | 13 |
| 22 | October 29, 1966 | Syracuse, NY | Syracuse | 33 | Pittsburgh | 7 |
| 23 | November 4, 1967 | Pittsburgh, PA | Syracuse | 14 | Pittsburgh | 7 |
| 24 | October 12, 1968 | Syracuse, NY | #15 Syracuse | 50 | Pittsburgh | 17 |
| 25 | November 1, 1969 | Pittsburgh, PA | Pittsburgh | 21 | Syracuse | 20 |
| 26 | October 31, 1970 | Syracuse, NY | Syracuse | 43 | #15 Pittsburgh | 13 |
| 27 | October 30, 1971 | Pittsburgh, PA | Pittsburgh | 31 | Syracuse | 21 |
| 28 | October 28, 1972 | Syracuse, NY | Syracuse | 10 | Pittsburgh | 6 |
| 29 | November 3, 1973 | Pittsburgh, PA | Pittsburgh | 28 | Syracuse | 14 |
| 30 | November 2, 1974 | Syracuse, NY | Pittsburgh | 21 | Syracuse | 13 |
| 31 | November 1, 1975 | Syracuse, NY | Pittsburgh | 38 | Syracuse | 0 |
| 32 | October 30, 1976 | Pittsburgh, PA | #2 Pittsburgh | 23 | Syracuse | 13 |
| 33 | October 22, 1977 | Pittsburgh, PA | #14 Pittsburgh | 28 | Syracuse | 21 |
| 34 | November 4, 1978 | Syracuse, NY | #19 Pittsburgh | 18 | Syracuse | 17 |
| 35 | November 3, 1979 | Pittsburgh, PA | #12 Pittsburgh | 28 | Syracuse | 21 |
| 36 | November 1, 1980 | Syracuse, NY | #11 Pittsburgh | 43 | Syracuse | 6 |
| 37 | October 24, 1981 | Pittsburgh, PA | #2 Pittsburgh | 23 | Syracuse | 10 |
| 38 | October 23, 1982 | Syracuse, NY | #2 Pittsburgh | 14 | Syracuse | 0 |
| 39 | October 29, 1983 | Pittsburgh, PA | Pittsburgh | 13 | Syracuse | 10 |
| 40 | November 3, 1984 | Syracuse, NY | Syracuse | 13 | Pittsburgh | 7 |
| 41 | November 2, 1985 | Pittsburgh, PA | Syracuse | 12 | Pittsburgh | 0 |
| 42 | November 1, 1986 | Syracuse, NY | Syracuse | 24 | Pittsburgh | 20 |

| No. | Date | Location | Winning team | | Losing team | |
|---|---|---|---|---|---|---|
| 43 | October 31, 1987 | Pittsburgh, PA | #8 Syracuse | 24 | Pittsburgh | 10 |
| 44 | December 3, 1988 | Syracuse, NY | #18 Syracuse | 24 | Pittsburgh | 7 |
| 45 | September 23, 1989 | Pittsburgh, PA | #13 Pittsburgh | 30 | #10 Syracuse | 23 |
| 46 | September 22, 1990 | Syracuse, NY | Tie | 20 | Tie | 20 |
| 47 | October 19, 1991 | Pittsburgh, PA | #24 Syracuse | 31 | #20 Pittsburgh | 27 |
| 48 | October 31, 1992 | Syracuse, NY | Syracuse | 41 | Pittsburgh | 10 |
| 49 | October 16, 1993 | Pittsburgh, PA | Syracuse | 24 | Pittsburgh | 21 |
| 50 | October 8, 1994 | Syracuse, NY | Syracuse | 31 | Pittsburgh | 7 |
| 51 | November 11, 1995 | Pittsburgh, PA | Syracuse | 42 | Pittsburgh | 10 |
| 52 | October 12, 1996 | Syracuse, NY | Syracuse | 55 | Pittsburgh | 7 |
| 53 | November 15, 1997 | Pittsburgh, PA | Syracuse | 32 | Pittsburgh | 27 |
| 54 | October 31, 1998 | Syracuse, NY | Syracuse | 45 | Pittsburgh | 28 |
| 55 | October 7, 1999 | Pittsburgh, PA | Syracuse | 24 | Pittsburgh | 17 |
| 56 | October 7, 2000 | Syracuse, NY | Syracuse | 24 | Pittsburgh | 17^{2OT} |
| 57 | October 13, 2001 | Pittsburgh, PA | Syracuse | 42 | Pittsburgh | 10 |
| 58 | October 5, 2002 | Syracuse, NY | Pittsburgh | 48 | Syracuse | 24 |
| 59 | October 25, 2003 | Pittsburgh, PA | Pittsburgh | 34 | Syracuse | 14 |
| 60 | November 6, 2004 | Syracuse, NY | Syracuse^{†} | 38 | Pittsburgh | 31^{2OT} |
| 61 | October 22, 2005 | Pittsburgh, PA | Pittsburgh | 34 | Syracuse | 17 |
| 62 | October 7, 2006 | Syracuse, NY | Pittsburgh | 21 | Syracuse | 11 |
| 63 | November 3, 2007 | Pittsburgh, PA | Pittsburgh | 20 | Syracuse | 17 |
| 64 | September 27, 2008 | Syracuse, NY | Pittsburgh | 34 | Syracuse | 24 |
| 65 | November 7, 2009 | Pittsburgh, PA | #14 Pittsburgh | 37 | Syracuse | 10 |
| 66 | October 16, 2010 | Syracuse, NY | Pittsburgh | 45 | Syracuse | 14 |
| 67 | December 3, 2011 | Pittsburgh, PA | Pittsburgh | 33 | Syracuse | 20 |
| 68 | October 5, 2012 | Syracuse, NY | Syracuse | 14 | Pittsburgh | 13 |
| 69 | November 23, 2013 | Syracuse, NY | Pittsburgh | 17 | Syracuse | 16 |
| 70 | November 22, 2014 | Pittsburgh, PA | Pittsburgh | 30 | Syracuse | 7 |
| 71 | October 24, 2015 | Syracuse, NY | #25 Pittsburgh | 23 | Syracuse | 20 |
| 72 | November 26, 2016 | Pittsburgh, PA | Pittsburgh | 76 | Syracuse | 61 |
| 73 | October 7, 2017 | Syracuse, NY | Syracuse | 27 | Pittsburgh | 24 |
| 74 | October 6, 2018 | Pittsburgh, PA | Pittsburgh | 44 | Syracuse | 37^{OT} |
| 75 | October 18, 2019 | Syracuse, NY | Pittsburgh | 27 | Syracuse | 20 |
| 76 | September 19, 2020 | Pittsburgh, PA | #25 Pittsburgh | 21 | Syracuse | 10 |
| 77 | November 27, 2021 | Syracuse, NY | #17 Pittsburgh | 31 | Syracuse | 14 |
| 78 | November 5, 2022 | Pittsburgh, PA | Pittsburgh | 19 | #20 Syracuse | 9 |
| 79 | November 11, 2023 | Bronx, NY | Syracuse | 28 | Pittsburgh | 13 |
| 80 | October 24, 2024 | Pittsburgh, PA | #19 Pittsburgh | 41 | Syracuse | 13 |
| 81 | October 18, 2025 | Syracuse, NY | Pittsburgh | 30 | Syracuse | 13 |
| 82 | September 17, 2026 | Pittsburgh, PA | Pittsburgh | 27 | Syracuse | 13 |
Series: Pittsburgh leads 46–32–3
† Vacated by Syracuse

== See also ==
- List of NCAA college football rivalry games
