= 2022 SMU Mustangs football team =

American college football season

2022 SMU Mustangs football
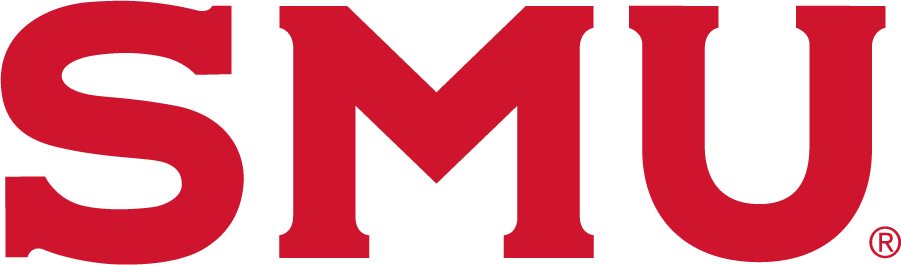

New Mexico Bowl, L 23–24 vs. BYU
- Conference: American Athletic Conference
- Record: 7–6 (5–3 The American)
- Head coach: Rhett Lashlee (1st season)
- Offensive coordinator: Casey Woods (1st season)
- Offensive scheme: Bear raid
- Defensive coordinator: Scott Symons (1st season)
- Base defense: Multiple 3–4
- Home stadium: Gerald J. Ford Stadium

Uniform
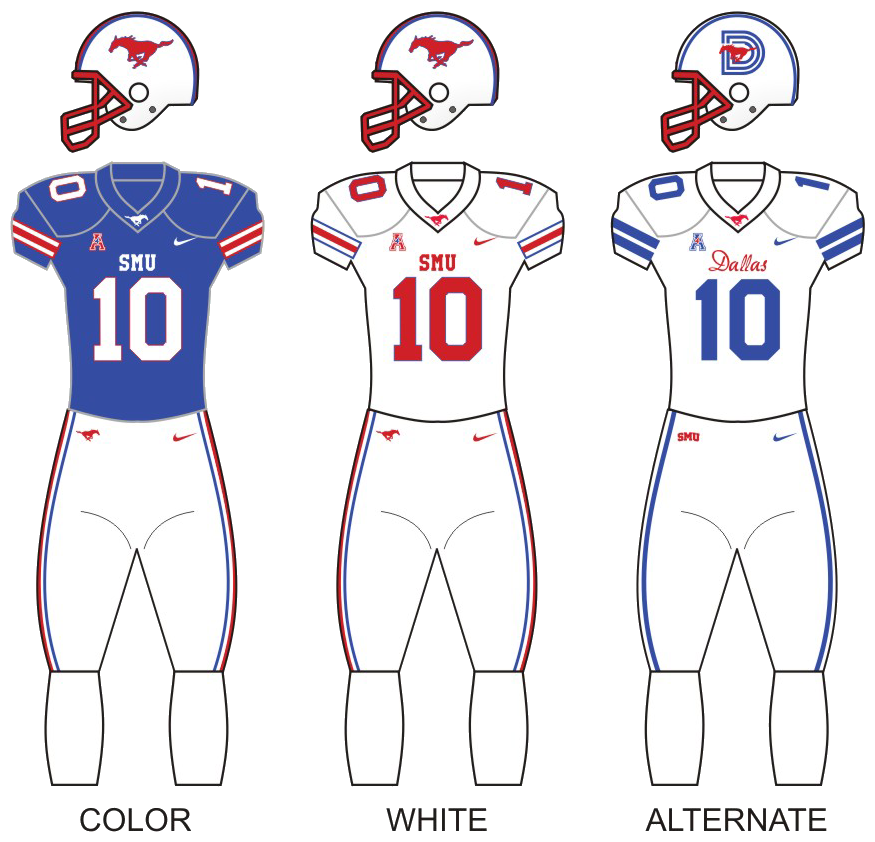

2022 American Athletic Conference football standings
| | Conf. | | | Overall |
| Team | W | | L | W | | L |
|---|---|---|---|---|---|---|
| No. 9 Tulane y$ | 7 | – | 1 | 12 | – | 2 |
| UCF y | 6 | – | 2 | 9 | – | 5 |
| Cincinnati | 6 | – | 2 | 9 | – | 4 |
| SMU | 5 | – | 3 | 7 | – | 6 |
| Houston | 5 | – | 3 | 8 | – | 5 |
| East Carolina | 4 | – | 4 | 8 | – | 5 |
| Navy | 4 | – | 4 | 4 | – | 8 |
| Memphis | 3 | – | 5 | 7 | – | 6 |
| Tulsa | 3 | – | 5 | 5 | – | 7 |
| Temple | 1 | – | 7 | 3 | – | 9 |
| South Florida | 0 | – | 8 | 1 | – | 11 |
Championship: Tulane 45, UCF 28
$ – Conference champion; y – Championship game participant; Rankings from AP Poll

The 2022 SMU Mustangs football team represented Southern Methodist University in the 2022 NCAA Division I FBS football season. The Mustangs played their home games at Gerald J. Ford Stadium in University Park, Texas, a separate city within the city limits of Dallas, and competed in the American Athletic Conference (The American). They were led by first-year head coach Rhett Lashlee.

== Preseason ==
=== Media poll ===
The American Athletic Conference media day was held virtually on July 28. The Mustangs were predicted to finish fourth in the conference preseason poll.

== Schedule ==
SMU and The American announced the 2022 football schedule on February 17, 2022.

| Date | Time | Opponent | Site | TV | Result | Attendance |
|---|---|---|---|---|---|---|
| September 3 | 6:30 p.m. | at North Texas* | Apogee Stadium; Denton, TX (Safeway Bowl) | CBSSN | W 48–10 | 25,306 |
| September 10 | 6:00 p.m. | Lamar* | Gerald J. Ford Stadium; University Park, TX | ESPN+ | W 45–16 | 26,509 |
| September 17 | 6:30 p.m. | at Maryland* | Maryland Stadium; College Park, MD | FS1 | L 27–34 | 31,194 |
| September 24 | 11:00 a.m. | TCU* | Gerald J. Ford Stadium; University Park, TX (rivalry) | ESPNU | L 34–42 | 35,569 |
| October 5 (Note: Due to Hurricane Ian's impact on Orlando and surrounding areas, the UCF versus SMU football game was moved to Wednesday, October 5.) | 6:00 p.m. | at UCF | FBC Mortgage Stadium; Orlando, FL | ESPN2 | L 19–41 | 27,495 |
| October 14 | 6:30 p.m. | Navy | Gerald J. Ford Stadium; University Park, TX (Gansz Trophy) | ESPN | W 40–34 | 24,583 |
| October 22 | 11:00 a.m. | No. 21 Cincinnati^{†} | Gerald J. Ford Stadium; University Park, TX | ESPN | L 27–29 | 23,566 |
| October 29 | 2:30 p.m. | at Tulsa | H.A. Chapman Stadium; Tulsa, OK | ESPN+ | W 45–34 | 22,993 |
| November 5 | 6:00 p.m. | Houston | Gerald J. Ford Stadium; University Park, TX (rivalry) | NFLN | W 77–63 | 23,841 |
| November 12 | 11:00 a.m. | at South Florida | Raymond James Stadium; Tampa, FL | ESPNU | W 41–23 | 24,907 |
| November 17 | 6:30 p.m. | at No. 21 Tulane | Yulman Stadium; New Orleans, LA | ESPN | L 24–59 | 20,894 |
| November 26 | 2:30 p.m. | Memphis | Gerald J. Ford Stadium; University Park, TX | ESPN2 | W 34–31 | 15,759 |
| December 17 | 6:30 p.m. | vs. BYU* | University Stadium; Albuquerque, NM (New Mexico Bowl) | ABC | L 23–24 | 22,209 |
*Non-conference game; ^{†}Homecoming; Rankings from AP Poll (and CFP Rankings, after November 1) - Released prior to game; All times are in Central time

Schedule Source:

== Personnel ==
2022 SMU Mustangs football team roster
Players
Coaches
Offense

| Pos. | # | Name | Class |
|---|---|---|---|
| RB | 0 | Camar Wheaton | Fr |
| WR | 1 | Jordan Kerley | Jr |
| QB | 2 | Preston Stone | Fr |
| WR | 3 | Beau Corrales | Sr |
| RB | 4 | Tre Siggers | Sr |
| WR | 5 | Moochie Dixon | So |
| QB | 7 | Kevin Jennings | Fr |
| QB | 8 | Tanner Mordecai | Sr |
| WR | 9 | Beau Barker | Jr |
| WR | 10 | Dylan Goffney | So |
| WR | 11 | Rashee Rice | Sr |
| WR | 12 | Jake Bailey | Sr |
| WR | 13 | Roderick Daniels Jr. | So |
| TE | 14 | Nolan Matthews-Harris | Jr |
| WR | 15 | Calvin Wiggins | Jr |
| QB | 16 | Owen Easley | Jr |
| WR | 18 | Teddy Knox | Fr |
| WR | 20 | Jayleen Record | So |
| QB | 21 | Will Kuehne | Jr |
| RB | 22 | Brandon Epton | So |
| WR | 23 | Austin Upshaw | Sr |
| RB | 24 | Velton Gardner | Jr |
| RB | 25 | T.J. McDaniel | So |
| RB | 26 | Montaye Dawson | Fr |
| RB | 27 | Zane Minors | Fr |
| QB | 28 | Charlie Fiser | Fr |
| WR | 29 | Daylon Dickerson | Fr |
| WR | 30 | Carter Campbell | So |
| RB | 31 | Tyler Lavine | Sr |
| WR | 32 | Joey Bruszer | Fr |
| WR | 33 | Hudson Shrum | Sr |
| WR | 34 | Parker Chappell | Fr |
| WR | 39 | Keaton Cheves | Fr |
| WR | 43 | Conner Moore | Fr |
| TE | 44 | Sam Morse | Fr |
| TE | 45 | Sam Caspino | Fr |
| TE | 46 | Markus Schumacher | Fr |
| WR | 47 | Nic Heck | Jr |
| OL | 51 | Justin Osborne | Jr |
| OL | 52 | Marcus Bryant | Jr |
| OL | 54 | Joe Bissinger | Sr |
| OL | 56 | Branson Hickman | So |
| OL | 57 | Erin Smith | So |
| OL | 64 | Cameron Ervin | Jr |
| OL | 67 | Dylan Cordell | So |
| OL | 68 | Jackson Ritz | So |
| OL | 69 | Jacob Waller | Fr |
| OL | 70 | Thalen Robinson | Jr |
| OL | 71 | Jaylon Thomas | Sr |
| OL | 72 | Rhett Larson | Fr |
| OL | 74 | Owen Condon | Sr |
| OL | 75 | Ben Sparks | So |
| OL | 76 | Keaton Schulz | So |
| OL | 77 | Max Yao | So |
| OL | 78 | Dalton Perdue | So |
| OL | 79 | Nate Bennett | Fr |
| TE | 81 | Ben Redding | Sr |
| TE | 82 | R. J. Maryland | Fr |
| TE | 83 | Kam Allen | So |
| WR | 85 | Thomas Southey | Fr |
| TE | 86 | Davis Hawkins | So |
| TE | 88 | Simon Gonzalez | Jr |
| TE | 89 | Gage Haskin | So |

Defense

| Pos. | # | Name | Class |
|---|---|---|---|
| S | 0 | Bryan Massey | Jr |
| S | 1 | Brandon Crossley | Sr |
| S | 2 | Isaiah Nwokobia | So |
| DE | 3 | Gary Wiley | Sr |
| CB | 4 | Jahari Rogers | So |
| CB | 5 | Ar'mani Johnson | Sr |
| LB | 6 | Jimmy Phillips Jr. | Sr |
| CB | 7 | Bryce McMorris | So |
| LB | 8 | JaQwondis Burns | So |
| DE | 9 | Nelson Paul | Sr |
| DE | 10 | David Abiara | So |
| DE | 11 | Je'lin Samuels | Fr |
| LB | 12 | Shanon Reid | Sr |
| S | 13 | Roderick Roberson Jr. | Jr |
| CB | 14 | AJ Davis | Fr |
| LB | 15 | Keke Burns | Jr |
| S | 16 | Ahmaad Moses | Fr |
| S | 20 | Chris Adimora | Sr |
| S | 21 | Donald Clay | Jr |
| S | 22 | Nick Roberts | Sr |
| CB | 25 | Kevaris Hall | So |
| CB | 26 | Sam Westfall | Sr |
| CB | 27 | Ben Furgal | Jr |
| S | 28 | Luke Mabe | So |
| LB | 29 | Pierre Goree | Fr |
| CB | 31 | Ford Parker | Jr |
| S | 32 | Carson Richards | Fr |
| DT | 33 | Junior Aho | Sr |
| S | 34 | John Porter | Sr |
| S | 35 | Will Goldberg | Sr |
| S | 38 | Carter Link | Jr |
| DT | 39 | Darren Brown | Sr |
| DT | 40 | Elijah Chatman | Sr |
| LB | 41 | Isaac Slade-Matautia | Sr |
| LB | 42 | Deuce Palmer | Jr |
| S | 43 | Andrew Hale | Fr |
| LB | 44 | Kamryn Farrar | Jr |
| DE | 45 | Jayden Jones | Fr |
| LB | 46 | Trent Strong | Jr |
| DT | 47 | Stone Eby | So |
| DE | 49 | Parker Forque | Fr |
| DE | 50 | Trevion Sneed | Fr |
| LB | 51 | Harrison Thomas | So |
| DL | 52 | Ricky Cole III | Jr |
| LB | 53 | Garrett Madison | Jr |
| DE | 54 | Trey Fite | Fr |
| DT | 55 | Dylan Frazier | Fr |
| DE | 58 | Isaiah Smith | Fr |
| DE | 90 | Alex Sickafoose | Jr |
| DT | 91 | Terrance Newman | Sr |
| DT | 92 | Stephon Wright | Sr |
| DE | 95 | Matt Baer | Fr |
| DT | 96 | DeVere Levelston | Sr |
| DT | 98 | Mike Yoan Sandjo-Njiki | So |
| DT | 99 | Braylen Jackson | Fr |

Special teams

| Pos. | # | Name | Class |
|---|---|---|---|
| K | 41 | Collin Rogers | Fr |
| LS | 48 | Will Benton | Jr |
| LS | 49 | Jovoni Borbon | So |
| LS | 50 | Marcus Chan | Fr |
| P | 92 | Ryan Bujcevski | Sr |
| K, P | 93 | Brendan Hall | So |
| P | 94 | Michael Tadros | Fr |

Head coach

- Rhett Lashlee (Arkansas)

Coordinators/assistant coaches

- Scott Symons (Lindenwood) Defensive coordinator
- Casey Woods (Tennessee) Offensive coordinator
- Rob Likens (Mississippi State) Assistant head coach/wide receivers/pass game coordinator
- Craig Naivar (Hardin–Simmons) Special teams coordinator/safeties
- Jonathan Brewer (Arkansas) Quarterbacks
- Kyle Cooper (Robert Morris) Outside linebackers/recruiting coordinator
- Khenon Hall (Illinois State) Running backs
- Rickey Hunley Jr. (Drake) Cornerbacks/pass game coordinator
- Garin Justice (West Virginia) Offensive line/run game coordinator
- Calvin Thibodeaux (Oklahoma) Defensive line

Legend

- (C) Team captain
- (S) Suspended
- (I) Ineligible
- Injured
- Redshirt

Roster

== Game summaries ==
=== At North Texas ===
SMU Mustangs at North Texas Mean Green – Game summary

| Quarter | 1 | 2 | 3 | 4 | Total |
|---|---|---|---|---|---|
| Mustangs | 14 | 17 | 7 | 10 | 48 |
| Mean Green | 0 | 10 | 0 | 0 | 10 |

at Apogee Stadium, Denton, Texas

- Date: September 1
- Game time: 6:30 p.m. CDT
- Game weather: Sunny, 93 °F (34 °C)
- Game attendance: 25,306
- Referee: Luke Richmond
- TV announcers (CBSSN): Dave Ryan and Tom Herman
- Box score, Recap

Game information

First quarter

- SMU – Tre Siggers 9-yard run (Collin Rogers kick), 7:04. Mustangs 7–0. Drive: 13 plays, 82 yards, 4:13.
- SMU – Tyler Lavine 5-yard run (Collin Rogers kick), 3:05. Mustangs 14–0. Drive: 5 plays, 64 yards, 0:56.

Second quarter

- UNT – Ethan Mooney 33-yard field goal, 11:14. Mustangs 14–3. Drive: 5 plays, 16 yards, 2:27.
- SMU – Jordan Kerley 51-yard pass from Tanner Mordecai (Collin Rogers kick), 10:58. Mustangs 21–3. Drive: 1 play, 51 yards, 0:08.
- SMU – Collin Rogers 39-yard field goal, 4:52. Mustangs 24–3. Drive: 12 plays, 52 yards, 4:58.
- UNT – Oscar Adaway III 35-yard run (Ethan Mooney kick), 2:08. Mustangs 24–10. Drive: 8 plays, 79 yards, 2:38.'
- SMU – Roderick Daniels Jr. 75-yard pass from Tanner Mordecai (Collin Rogers kick), 1:57. Mustangs 31–10. Drive: 1 play, 75 yards, 0:11.

Third quarter

- SMU – Rashee Rice 24-yard pass from Tanner Mordecai (Collin Rogers kick), 3:54. Mustangs 38–10. Drive: 6 plays, 96 yards, 1:53.

Fourth quarter

- SMU – Moochie Dixon 8-yard pass from Tanner Mordecai (Collin Rogers kick), 14:16. Mustangs 45–10. Drive: 6 plays, 51 yards, 2:55.
- SMU – Collin Rogers 32-yard field goal, 6:47. Mustangs 48–10. Drive: 7 plays, 39 yards, 4:28.

Top passers

- SMU – Tanner Mordecai – 23/32, 432 yards, 4 TD
- UNT – Austin Aune – 14/29, 186 yards, 2 INT

Top rushers

- SMU – Tre Siggers – 12 rushes, 54 yards, TD
- UNT – Oscar Adaway III – 20 rushes, 117 yards, TD

Top receivers

- SMU – Rashee Rice – 8 receptions, 166 yards, TD
- UNT – Ja'Mori Maclin – 1 reception, 53 yards

=== Lamar ===
Lamar Cardinals at SMU Mustangs – Game summary

| Quarter | 1 | 2 | 3 | 4 | Total |
|---|---|---|---|---|---|
| Cardinals | 0 | 10 | 3 | 3 | 16 |
| Mustangs | 14 | 10 | 14 | 7 | 45 |

at Gerald J. Ford Stadium, University Park, Texas

- Date: September 10
- Game time: 6:00 p.m. CDT
- Game weather: Sunny, 88 °F (31 °C)
- Game attendance: 26,509
- Referee: Edwin Lee
- TV announcers (ESPN+): Ted Emrich, Stanford Routt, and Morgan Uber
- Box score, Recap

Game information

First quarter

- SMU – Rashee Rice 8-yard pass from Tanner Mordecai (Collin Rogers kick), 11:18. Mustangs 7–0. Drive: 5 plays, 38 yards.
- SMU – Ben Redding 1-yard pass from Tanner Mordecai (Collin Rogers kick), 8:27. Mustangs 14–0. Drive: 4 plays, 11 yards.

Second quarter

- SMU – Collin Rogers 20-yard field goal, 12:08. Mustangs 17–0. Drive: 12 plays, 82 yards, 2:55.
- LAM – Khalan Griffin 1-yard run (Chris Esqueda kick), 3:42. Mustangs 17–7. Drive: 14 plays, 75 yards, 8:26.
- SMU – T. J. McDaniel 57-yard run (Collin Rogers kick), 2:38. Mustangs 24–7. Drive: 4 plays, 68 yards, 1:04.
- LAM – Chris Esqueda 42-yard field goal, 0:00. Mustangs 24–10. Drive: 9 plays, 51 yards, 2:38.

Third quarter

- SMU – T. J. McDaniel 1-yard run (Collin Rogers kick), 11:24. Mustangs 31–10. Drive: 7 plays, 92 yards, 1:45.
- LAM – Chris Esqueda 38-yard field goal, 2:14. Mustangs 31–13. Drive: 13 plays, 46 yards, 6:42.
- SMU – Rashee Rice 20-yard pass from Tanner Mordecai (Collin Rogers kick), 0:18. Mustangs 38–13. Drive: 7 plays, 70 yards, 1:56.

Fourth quarter

- SMU – Preston Stone 8-yard run (Collin Rogers kick), 11:51. Mustangs 45–13. Drive: 4 plays, 30 yards, 1:47.
- LAM – Chris Esqueda 46-yard field goal, 7:41. Mustangs 45–16. Drive: 4 plays, -8 yards, 1:26.

Top passers

- LAM – Mike Chandler – 10/25, 127 yards, INT
- SMU – Tanner Mordecai – 18/31, 212 yards, 3 TD, INT

Top rushers

- LAM – Khalan Griffin – 13 rushes, 31 yards, TD
- SMU – Velton Gardner – 11 rushes, 100 yards

Top receivers

- LAM – Jalen Dummett – 5 receptions, 58 yards
- SMU – Rashee Rice – 9 receptions, 132 yards, 2 TD

=== At Maryland ===
SMU Mustangs at Maryland Terrapins – Game summary

| Quarter | 1 | 2 | 3 | 4 | Total |
|---|---|---|---|---|---|
| Mustangs | 6 | 14 | 7 | 0 | 27 |
| Terrapins | 3 | 14 | 3 | 14 | 34 |

at Maryland Stadium, College Park, Maryland

- Date: September 17
- Game time: 6:30 p.m. CDT / 7:30 p.m. EDT
- Game weather: Cloudy, 73 °F (23 °C)
- Game attendance: 31,194
- Referee: Mark Kluczynski
- TV announcers (FS1): Eric Collins and Devin Gardner
- Box score, Recap

Game information

First quarter

- MD – Chad Ryland 36-yard field goal, 8:26. Terrapins 3–0. Drive: 6 plays, 74 yards, 3:24.
- SMU – Collin Rogers 27-yard field goal, 4:37. Tied 3–3. Drive: 11 plays, 65 yards, 3:49.
- SMU – Collin Rogers 43-yard field goal, 3:26. Mustangs 6–3. Drive: 4 plays, 4 yards, 1:04.

Second quarter

- SMU – R. J. Maryland 51-yard pass from Tanner Mordecai (Collin Rogers kick), 14:53. Mustangs 13–3. Drive: 7 plays, 75 yards, 2:19.
- MD – Antwain Littleton II 1-yard run (Chad Ryland kick), 5:43. Mustangs 13–10. Drive: 11 plays, 65 yards, 4:58.
- MD – Rakim Jarrett 48-yard pass from Taulia Tagovailoa (Chad Ryland kick), 4:30. Terrapins 17–13. Drive: 1 play, 48 yards, 0:09.
- SMU – Austin Upshaw 13-yard pass from Tanner Mordecai (Collin Rogers kick), 2:42. Mustangs 20–17. Drive: 7 plays, 75 yards, 1:48.

Third quarter

- MD – Chad Ryland 41-yard field goal, 11:34. Tied 20–20. Drive: 7 plays, 35 yards, 3:20.
- SMU – Moochie Dixon 7-yard pass from Tanner Mordecai (Collin Rogers kick), 6:42. Mustangs 27–20. Drive: 6 plays, 37 yards, 1:35.

Fourth quarter

- MD – Roman Hemby 1-yard run (Chad Ryland kick), 14:29. Tied 27–27. Drive: 9 plays, 68 yards, 3:22.
- MD – Corey Dyches 5-yard pass from Taulia Tagovailoa (Chad Ryland kick), 7:30. Terrapins 34–27. Drive: 10 plays, 46 yards, 4:40.

Top passers

- SMU – Tanner Mordecai – 29/54, 369 yards, 3 TD, 2 INT
- MD – Taulia Tagovailoa – 17/23, 214 yards, 2 TD

Top rushers

- SMU – Tre Siggers – 19 rushes, 86 yards
- MD – Roman Hemby – 16 rushes, 151 yards, TD

Top receivers

- SMU – Rashee Rice – 11 receptions, 193 yards
- MD – Rakim Jarrett – 2 receptions, 65 yards, TD

=== TCU ===
TCU Horned Frogs at SMU Mustangs – Game summary

| Quarter | 1 | 2 | 3 | 4 | Total |
|---|---|---|---|---|---|
| Horned Frogs | 14 | 14 | 0 | 14 | 42 |
| Mustangs | 0 | 14 | 7 | 13 | 34 |

at Gerald J. Ford Stadium, University Park, Texas

- Date: September 24
- Game time: 11:00 a.m. CDT
- Game weather: Sunny, 95 °F (35 °C)
- Game attendance: 35,569
- Referee: Derek Anderson
- TV announcers (ESPNU): John Schriffen and Rene Ingoglia
- Box score, Recap

Game information

First quarter

- TCU – Savion Williams 19-yard pass from Max Duggan (Griffin Kell kick), 12:33. Horned Frogs 7–0. Drive: 5 plays, 74 yards, 2:22.
- TCU – Kendre Miller 28-yard run (Griffin Kell kick), 0:51. Horned Frogs 14–0. Drive: 9 plays, 81 yards, 3:34.

Second quarter

- SMU – Tre Siggers 1-yard run (Collin Rogers kick), 11:18. Horned Frogs 14–7. Drive: 13 plays, 75 yards, 4:33.
- TCU – Jared Wiley 8-yard pass from Max Duggan (Griffin Kell kick), 9:16. Horned Frogs 21–7. Drive: 4 plays, 43 yards, 1:51.
- TCU – Derius Davis 80-yard pass from Maz Duggan (Griffin Kell kick), 6:39. Horned Frogs 28–7. Drive: 1 play, 80 yards, 0:11.
- SMU – Rashee Rice 19-yard pass from Tanner Mordecai (Collin Rogers kick), 1:57. Horned Frogs 28–14. Drive: 12 plays, 75 yards, 4:42.

Third quarter

- SMU – Tre Siggers 1-yard run (Collin Rogers kick), 3:33. Horned Frogs 28–21. Drive: 10 plays, 98 yards, 3:16.

Fourth quarter

- TCU – Emari Demercado 1-yard run (Griffin Kell kick), 8:14. Horned Frogs 35–21. Drive: 6 plays, 37 yards, 3:11.
- SMU – Tre Siggers 2-yard run (pass failed), 5:14. Horned Frogs 35–27. Drive: 8 plays, 75 yards, 3:00.
- TCU – Emari Demercado 63-yard run (Griffin Kell kick), 2:31. Horned Frogs 42–27. Drive: 5 plays, 72 yards, 2:42.
- SMU – Jake Bailey 35-yard pass from Tanner Mordecai (Collin Rogers kick), 1:04. Horned Frogs 42–34. Drive: 10 plays, 75 yards, 1:27.

Top passers

- TCU – Max Duggan – 22/29, 278 yards, 3 TD
- SMU – Tanner Mordecai – 27/49, 372 yards, 2 TD, 2 INT

Top rushers

- TCU – Kendre Miller – 17 rushes, 142 yards, TD
- SMU – Tre Siggers – 19 rushes, 60 yards, 3 TD

Top receivers

- TCU – Derius Davis – 3 receptions, 78 yards, TD
- SMU – Jake Bailey – 8 receptions, 163 yards, TD

=== At UCF ===
SMU Mustangs at UCF Knights – Game summary

| Quarter | 1 | 2 | 3 | 4 | Total |
|---|---|---|---|---|---|
| Mustangs | 7 | 6 | 0 | 6 | 19 |
| Knights | 3 | 7 | 14 | 17 | 41 |

at FBC Mortgage Stadium, Orlando, Florida

- Date: October 5
- Game time: 6:00 p.m. CDT / 7:00 p.m. EDT
- Game weather: Sunny, 78 °F (26 °C)
- Game attendance: 27,495
- Referee: Luke Richmond
- TV announcers (ESPN2): Tiffany Greene, Rene Ingoglia, and Dawn Davenport
- Box score, Recap

Game information

First quarter

- UCF – Colton Boomer 41-yard field goal, 10:02. Knights 3–0. Drive: 11 plays, 30 yards, 3:54.
- SMU – Velton Gardner 39-yard run (Collin Rogers kick), 7:27. Mustangs 7–3. Drive: 8 plays, 75 yards, 2:35.

Second quarter

- SMU – Collin Rogers 32-yard field goal, 13:44. Mustangs 10–3. Drive: 13 plays, 68 yards, 3:40.
- UCF – Isaiah Bowser 1-yard run (Colton Boomer kick), 5:49. Tied 10–10. Drive: 10 plays, 70 yards, 4:24.
- SMU – Collin Rogers 24-yard field goal, 3:24. Mustangs 13–10. Drive: 10 plays, 68 yards, 2:25.

Third quarter

- UCF – Isaiah Bowser 1-yard run (Colton Boomer kick), 13:14. Knights 17–13. Drive: 5 plays, 79 yards, 1:39.
- UCF – Ryan O'Keefe 26-yard pass from John Rhys Plumlee (Colton Boomer kick), 3:07. Knights 24–13. Drive: 8 plays, 86 yards, 3:10.

Fourth quarter

- UCF – Tanner Mordecai sacked in end zone, 12:41. Knights 26–13.
- UCF – Ryan O'Keefe 58-yard pass from John Rhys Plumlee (John Rhys Plumlee pass to Kobe Hudson), 11:51. Knights 34–13. Drive: 2 plays, 63 yards, 0:43.
- UCF – Isaiah Bowser 3-yard run (Colton Boomer kick), 5:27. Knights 41–13. Drive: 9 plays, 71 yards, 5:14.
- SMU – Preston Stone 2-yard run, 0:00. Knights 41–19. Drive: 7 plays, 62 yards, 1:28.

Top passers

- UCF – John Rhys Plumlee – 22/29, 278 yards, 3 TD
- SMU – Tanner Mordecai – 27/49, 372 yards, 2 TD, 2 INT

Top rushers

- UCF – RJ Harvey – 17 rushes, 142 yards, TD
- SMU – Velton Gardner – 19 rushes, 60 yards, 3 TD

Top receivers

- UCF – Javon Baker – 3 receptions, 78 yards, TD
- SMU – Rashee Rice – 8 receptions, 163 yards, TD

=== Navy ===
Navy Midshipmen at SMU Mustangs – Game summary

| Quarter | 1 | 2 | 3 | 4 | Total |
|---|---|---|---|---|---|
| Midshipmen | 0 | 7 | 7 | 20 | 34 |
| Mustangs | 10 | 3 | 20 | 7 | 40 |

at Gerald J. Ford Stadium, University Park, Texas

- Date: October 14
- Game time: 6:30 p.m. CDT
- Game weather: Sunny, 88 °F (31 °C)
- Game attendance: 24,583
- Referee: Edwin Lee
- TV announcers (ESPN): Roy Philpott, Andre Ware, and Paul Carcaterra
- Box score, Recap

Game information

First quarter

- SMU – Collin Rogers 30-yard field goal, 11:01. Mustangs 7–0. Drive: 8 plays, 74 yards, 3:48.
- SMU – Dylan Goffney 24-yard pass from Tanner Mordecai (Collin Rogers kick), 7:00. Mustangs 10–0. Drive: 3 plays, 56 yards, 0:53.

Second quarter

- SMU – Collin Rogers 46-yard field goal, 11:49. Mustangs 13–0. Drive: 11 plays, 64 yards, 3:18.
- NAVY – Vincent Terrell Jr. 24-yard pass from Tai Lavatai (Daniel Davies kick), 0:14. Mustangs 13–7. Drive: 9 plays, 66 yards, 1:34.

Third quarter

- NAVY – Tai Lavatai 15-yard run (Daniel Davies kick), 11:13. Midshipmen 14–13. Drive: 6 plays, 75 yards, 3:47.
- SMU – Tanner Mordecai 60-yard run (pass failed), 10:40. Mustangs 19–14. Drive: 2 plays, 69 yards, 0:33.
- SMU – T. J. McDaniel 1-yard run (Collin Rogers kick), 5:49. Mustangs 26–14. Drive: 7 plays, 26 yards, 2:28.
- SMU – Jordan Kerley 33-yard pass from Tanner Mordecai (Collin Rogers kick), 2:49. Mustangs 33–14. Drive: 2 plays, 80 yards, 0:26.

Fourth quarter

- NAVY – Jayden Umbarger 26-yard pass from Tai Lavatai (run failed), 14:21. Mustangs 33–20. Drive: 10 plays, 75 yards, 3:28.
- SMU – Roderick Daniels Jr. 27-yard pass from Tanner Mordecai (Collin Rogers kick), 8:28. Mustangs 40–20. Drive: 5 plays, 72 yards, 2:05.
- NAVY – Logan Point 3-yard run (Daniel Davies kick), 2:31. Mustangs 40–27. Drive: 16 plays, 75 yards, 5:57.
- NAVY – Tai Lavatai 1-yard run (Daniel Davies kick), 0:09. Mustangs 40–34. Drive: 13 plays, 80 yards, 1:13.

Top passers

- NAVY – Tai Lavatai – 9/21, 138 yards, 2 TD, INT
- SMU – Tanner Mordecai – 20/27, 336 yards, 3 TD

Top rushers

- NAVY – Tai Lavatai – 25 rushes, 120 yards, 2 TD
- SMU – Tanner Mordecai – 6 rushes, 74 yards, TD

Top receivers

- NAVY – Jayden Umbarger – 5 receptions, 59 yards, TD
- SMU – Dylan Goffney – 4 receptions, 116 yards, TD

=== No. 21 Cincinnati ===
No. 21 Cincinnati Bearcats at SMU Mustangs – Game summary

| Quarter | 1 | 2 | 3 | 4 | Total |
|---|---|---|---|---|---|
| No. 21 Bearcats | 10 | 10 | 9 | 0 | 29 |
| Mustangs | 0 | 14 | 0 | 13 | 27 |

at Gerald J. Ford Stadium, University Park, Texas

- Date: October 22
- Game time: 11:00 a.m. CDT
- Game weather: Sunny, 73 °F (23 °C)
- Game attendance: 23,566
- Referee: Kevin Randall
- TV announcers (ESPN): Mark Jones, Robert Griffin III, and Quint Kessenich
- Box score, Recap

Game information

First quarter

- CIN – Ryan Coe 30-yard field goal, 10:55. Bearcats 3–0. Drive: 4 plays, -3 yards, 1:25.
- CIN – Ryan Montgomery 1-yard run (Ryan Coe kick), 0:33. Bearcats 10–0. Drive: 11 plays, 62 yards, 5:38.

Second quarter

- CIN – Charles McClelland 76-yard run (Ryan Coe kick), 13:34. Bearcats 17–0. Drive: 1 play, 76 yards, 0:12.
- SMU – T. J. McDaniel 3-yard run (Collin Rogers kick), 8:12. Bearcats 17–7. Drive: 2 plays, 46 yards, 0:25.
- CIN – Ryan Coe 25-yard field goal, 4:05. Bearcats 20–7. Drive: 12 plays, 67 yards, 4:07.
- SMU – Jordan Kerley 1-yard pass from Tanner Mordecai (Collin Rogers kick), 0:12. Bearcats 20–14. Drive: 13 plays, 77 yards, 3:38.

Third quarter

- CIN – Ryan Coe 52-yard field goal, 10:20. Bearcats 23–14. Drive: 7 plays, 29 yards, 4:37.
- CIN – Ryan Coe 44-yard field goal, 6:26. Bearcats 26–14. Drive: 7 plays, 29 yards, 3:22.
- CIN – Ryan Coe 31-yard field goal, 1:58. Bearcats 29–14. Drive: 6 plays, 37 yards, 2:24.

Fourth quarter

- SMU – R. J. Maryland 16-yard pass from Preston Stone (Collin Rogers kick), 5:09. Bearcats 29–21. Drive: 11 plays, 62 yards, 3:11.
- SMU – Tyler Lavine 1-yard run (pass failed), 1:57. Bearcats 29–27. Drive: 9 plays, 82 yards, 1:41.

Top passers

- CIN – Ben Bryant – 18/35, 200 yards
- SMU – Tanner Mordecai – 15/25, 105 yards, TD, INT

Top rushers

- CIN – Charles McClelland – 16 rushes, 129 yards, TD
- SMU – Camar Wheaton – 8 rushes, 53 yards

Top receivers

- CIN – Jadon Thompson – 4 receptions, 69 yards
- SMU – Jordan Kerley – 3 receptions, 44 yards, TD

=== At Tulsa ===
SMU Mustangs at Tulsa Golden Hurricane – Game summary

| Quarter | 1 | 2 | 3 | 4 | Total |
|---|---|---|---|---|---|
| Mustangs | 14 | 10 | 21 | 0 | 45 |
| Golden Hurricane | 7 | 0 | 13 | 14 | 34 |

at Skelly Field at H. A. Chapman Stadium, Tulsa, Oklahoma

- Date: October 29
- Game time: 2:30 p.m. CDT
- Game weather: Cloudy, 64 °F (18 °C)
- Game attendance: 22,993
- Referee: Tim Rich
- TV announcers (ESPN+): Richard Cross and Taylor McHargue
- Box score, Recap

Game information

First quarter

- SMU – Rashee Rice 75-yard pass from Preston Stone (Collin Rogers kick), 14:48. Mustangs 7–0. Drive: 1 play, 75 yards, 0:12.
- SMU – Tyler Lavine 1-yard run (Collin Rogers kick), 10:12. Mustangs 14–0. Drive: 9 plays, 53 yards, 3:05.
- TLSA – Isaiah Epps 7-yard pass from Davis Brin (Zack Long kick), 7:37. Mustangs 14–7. Drive: 8 plays, 75 yards, 2:35.

Second quarter

- SMU – Tyler Lavine 1-yard run (Collin Rogers kick), 11:49. Mustangs 21–7. Drive: 11 plays, 64 yards, 3:40.
- SMU – Collin Rogers 34-yard field goal, 0:00. Mustangs 24–7. Drive: 16 plays, 43 yards, 8:14.

Third quarter

- TLSA – Braylon Braxton 1-yard run (kick blocked), 11:54. Mustangs 24–13. Drive: 8 plays, 75 yards, 3:06.
- SMU – Tyler Lavine 2-yard run (Collin Rogers kick), 9:32. Mustangs 31–13. Drive: 6 plays, 74 yards, 2:16.
- TLSA – Davis Brin 21-yard run (Zack Long kick), 7:00. Mustangs 31–20. Drive: 7 plays, 75 yards, 2:32.
- SMU – Rashee Rice 6-yard pass from Kevin Jennings (Collin Rogers kick), 1:04. Mustangs 38–20. Drive: 11 plays, 75 yards, 5:49.
- SMU – Elijah Chatman 23-yard fumble return (Collin Rogers kick), 0:55. Mustangs 45–20.

Fourth quarter

- TLSA – Keylon Stokes 50-yard pass from Braylon Braxton (Zack Long kick), 14:42. Mustangs 45–27. Drive: 5 plays, 75 yards, 1:31.
- TLSA – Jordan Ford 9-yard pass from Braylon Braxton (Zack Long kick), 8:08. Mustangs 45–34. Drive: 13 plays, 57 yards, 4:59.

Top passers

- SMU – Preston Stone – 11/17, 219 yards, TD
- TLSA – Braylon Braxton – 8/14, 120 yards, 2 TD

Top rushers

- SMU – Tyler Lavine – 17 rushes, 72 yards, 3 TD
- TLSA – Deneric Prince – 19 rushes, 86 yards

Top receivers

- SMU – Rashee Rice – 9 receptions, 180 yards, 2 TD
- TLSA – Keylon Stokes – 5 receptions, 122 yards, TD

=== Houston ===
Houston Cougars at SMU Mustangs – Game summary

| Quarter | 1 | 2 | 3 | 4 | Total |
|---|---|---|---|---|---|
| Cougars | 14 | 21 | 14 | 14 | 63 |
| Mustangs | 21 | 35 | 7 | 14 | 77 |

at Gerald J. Ford Stadium, University Park, Texas

- Date: November 5
- Game time: 6:00 p.m. CDT
- Game weather: Sunny, 64 °F (18 °C)
- Game attendance: 23,841
- Referee: Luke Richmond
- TV announcers (NFLN): Jason Ross, Jr. and Tyoka Jackson
- Box score, Recap

Game information

First quarter

- SMU – Ben Redding 2-yard pass from Tanner Mordecai (Collin Rogers kick), 13:02. Mustangs 7–0. Drive: 4 plays, 41 yards, 1:51.
- HOU – Clayton Tune 55-yard run (Kyle Ramsey kick), 10:29. Tied 7–7. Drive: 5 plays, 78 yards, 2:29.
- SMU – Rashee Rice 6-yard pass from Tanner Mordecai (Collin Rogers kick), 7:36. Mustangs 14–7. Drive: 9 plays, 75 yards, 2:53.
- HOU – Sam Brown 12-yard pass from Clayton Tune (Kyle Ramsey kick), 4:57. Tied 14–14. Drive: 6 plays, 55 yards, 2:32.
- SMU – Rashee Rice 9-yard pass from Tanner Mordecai (Collin Rogers kick), 2:06. Mustangs 21–14. Drive: 8 plays, 75 yards, 2:51.

Second quarter

- HOU – Tank Dell 22-yard pass from Clayton Tune (Kyle Ramsey kick), 14:53. Tied 21–21. Drive: 4 plays, 75 yards, 2:13.
- SMU – Dylan Goffney 35-yard pass from Tanner Mordecai (Collin Rogers kick), 11:53. Mustangs 28–21. Drive: 8 plays, 68 yards, 2:55.
- SMU – Tanner Mordecai 2-yard run (Collin Rogers kick), 8:43. Mustangs 35–21. Drive: 8 plays, 27 yards, 2:45.
- SMU – R. J. Maryland 1-yard pass from Tanner Mordecai (Collin Rogers kick), 6:44. Mustangs 42–21. Drive: 5 plays, 22 yards, 1:36.
- HOU – KeSean Carter 37-yard pass from Clayton Tune (Kyle Ramsey kick), 5:34. Mustangs 42–28. Drive: 4 plays, 40 yards, 1:01.
- SMU – Ben Redding 10-yard pass from Tanner Mordecai (Collin Rogers kick), 4:16. Mustangs 49–28. Drive: 3 plays, 62 yards, 1:13.
- HOU – Matthew Golden 42-yard pass from Clayton Tune (Kyle Ramsey kick), 1:25. Mustangs 49–35. Drive: 5 plays, 65 yards, 2:48.
- SMU – Ben Redding 4-yard pass from Tanner Mordecai (Collin Rogers kick), 0:36. Mustangs 56–35. Drive: 5 plays, 63 yards, 0:44.

Third quarter

- HOU – Tank Dell 2-yard pass from Clayton Tune (Kyle Ramsey kick), 11:17. Mustangs 56–42. Drive: 7 plays, 60 yards, 3:37.
- SMU – R. J. Maryland 3-yard pass from Tanner Mordecai (Collin Rogers kick), 8:11. Mustangs 63–42. Drive: 11 plays, 75 yards, 3:06.
- HOU – Christian Trahan 1-yard pass from Clayton Tune (Kyle Ramsey kick), 1:28. Mustangs 63–49. Drive: 9 plays, 89 yards, 4:00.

Fourth quarter

- SMU – Moochie Dixon 43-yard pass from Tanner Mordecai (Collin Rogers kick), 12:52. Mustangs 70–49. Drive: 7 plays, 74 yards, 3:30.
- HOU – Sam Brown 6-yard pass from Clayton Tune (Kyle Ramsey kick), 9:32. Mustangs 70–56. Drive: 9 plays, 66 yards, 3:15.
- SMU – Tyler Lavine 15-yard run (Collin Rogers kick), 5:13. Mustangs 77–56. Drive: 7 plays, 50 yards, 4:17.
- HOU – Stacy Sneed 52-yard run (Kyle Ramsey kick), 3:37. Mustangs 77–63. Drive: 4 plays, 75 yards, 1:36.

Top passers

- HOU – Clayton Tune – 36/53, 527 yards, 7 TD, 3 INT
- SMU – Tanner Mordecai – 28/37, 379 yards, 9 TD

Top rushers

- HOU – Clayton Tune – 12 rushes, 111 yards, TD
- SMU – Tyler Lavine – 25 rushes, 146 yards, TD

Top receivers

- HOU – Tank Dell – 13 receptions, 180 yards, 2 TD
- SMU – Dylan Goffney – 3 receptions, 100 yards, TD

The Mustangs defeated the Cougars 77–63, breaking the record for the highest-scoring regulation game in FBS history. SMU quarterback Tanner Mordecai threw for a record 9 touchdowns, 7 of which came in the first half. The Mustangs also broke the school-record for most points in a game, with the previous record being 72.

=== At South Florida ===
SMU Mustangs at South Florida Bulls – Game summary

| Quarter | 1 | 2 | 3 | 4 | Total |
|---|---|---|---|---|---|
| Mustangs | 10 | 7 | 21 | 3 | 41 |
| Bulls | 0 | 17 | 0 | 6 | 23 |

at Raymond James Stadium, Tampa, Florida

- Date: November 12
- Game time: 11:00 a.m. CST / 12:00 p.m. EST
- Game weather: Sunny, 80 °F (27 °C)
- Game attendance: 24,907
- Referee: Kevin Randall
- TV announcers (ESPNU): Kevin Brown and Hutson Mason
- Box score, Recap

Game information

First quarter

- SMU – Camar Wheaton 1-yard run (Collin Rogers kick), 10:08. Mustangs 7–0. Drive: 6 plays, 54 yards, 1:28.
- SMU – Collin Rogers 22-yard field goal, 4:22. Mustangs 10–0. Drive: 9 plays, 50 yards, 3:40.

Second quarter

- USF – Jason Albritton 1-yard run (Spencer Shrader kick), 13:41. Mustangs 10–7. Drive: 12 plays, 75 yards, 5:36.
- SMU – Camar Wheaton 18-yard run (Collin Rogers kick), 9:23. Mustangs 17–7. Drive: 11 plays, 75 yards, 4:18.
- USF – Xavier Weaver 32-yard pass from Katravis Marsh (Spencer Shrader kick), 2:44. Mustangs 17–14. Drive: 3 plays, 51 yards, 1:10.
- USF – Spencer Shrader 41-yard field goal, 0:08. Tied 17–17. Drive: 7 plays, 40 yards, 0:53.

Third quarter

- SMU – Rashee Rice 21-yard pass from Tanner Mordecai (Collin Rogers kick), 8:10. Mustangs 24–17. Drive: 6 plays, 97 yards, 2:16.
- SMU – Jordan Kerley 70-yard pass from Tanner Mordecai (Collin Rogers kick), 5:56. Mustangs 31–17. Drive: 1 play, 70 yards, 0:09.
- SMU – Tyler Lavine 8-yard run (Collin Rogers kick), 0:13. Mustangs 38–17. Drive: 6 plays, 44 yards, 2:48.

Fourth quarter

- SMU – Collin Rogers 45-yard field goal, 8:02. Mustangs 41–17. Drive: 7 plays, 52 yards, 3:38.
- USF – Jayson Littlejohn 17-yard pass from Byrum Brown (pass failed), 1:46. Mustangs 41–23. Drive: 14 plays, 75 yards, 6:16.

Top passers

- SMU – Tanner Mordecai – 19/27, 280 yards, 2 TD
- USF – Katravis Marsh – 12/31, 178 yards, TD, INT

Top rushers

- SMU – Camar Wheaton – 14 rushes, 112 yards, 2 TD
- USF – Brian Battie – 26 rushes, 145 yards

Top receivers

- SMU – Jordan Kerley – 7 receptions, 156 yards, TD
- USF – Xavier Weaver – 4 receptions, 60 yards, TD

=== At No. 21 Tulane ===
SMU Mustangs at No. 21 Tulane Green Wave – Game summary

| Quarter | 1 | 2 | 3 | 4 | Total |
|---|---|---|---|---|---|
| Mustangs | 0 | 7 | 7 | 10 | 24 |
| No. 21 Green Wave | 21 | 7 | 21 | 10 | 59 |

at Yulman Stadium, New Orleans, Louisiana

- Date: November 17
- Game time: 6:30 p.m. CST
- Game weather: Clear, 50 °F (10 °C)
- Game attendance: 20,894
- Referee: Henry Johns
- TV announcers (ESPN): Matt Barrie, Louis Riddick, and Harry Lyles, Jr.
- Box score, Recap

Game information

First quarter

- TULN – Michael Pratt 6-yard run (Valentino Ambrosio kick), 7:01. Green Wave 7–0. Drive: 12 plays, 81 yards, 5:28.
- TULN – Tyjae Spears 2-yard run (Valentino Ambrosio kick), 5:06. Green Wave 14–0. Drive: 4 plays, 81 yards, 1:07.
- TULN – Tyjae Spears 5-yard pass from Michael Pratt (Valentino Ambrosio kick), 0:00. Green Wave 21–0. Drive: 2 plays, 7 yards, 0:49.

Second quarter

- SMU – R. J. Maryland 19-yard pass from Tanner Mordecai (Collin Rogers kick), 13:54. Green Wave 21–7. Drive: 1 play, 19 yards, 0:09.
- TULN – Michael Pratt 26-yard run (Valentino Ambrosio kick), 12:22. Green Wave 28–7. Drive: 3 plays, 37 yards, 1:32.

Third quarter

- TULN – Shae Wyatt 26-yard pass from Michael Pratt (Valentino Ambrosio kick), 13:32. Green Wave 35–7. Drive: 3 plays, 45 yards, 1:28.
- TULN – Tyjae Spears 12-yard run (Valentino Ambrosio kick), 7:32. Green Wave 42–7. Drive: 2 plays, 33 yards, 0:32.
- TULN – Shae Wyatt 48-yard pass from Michael Pratt (Valentino Ambrosio kick), 4:37. Green Wave 49–7. Drive: 1 play, 48 yards, 0:09.
- SMU – R. J. Maryland 13-yard pass from Tanner Mordecai (Collin Rogers kick), 1:53. Green Wave 49–14. Drive: 9 plays, 75 yards, 2:44.

Fourth quarter

- TULN – Michael Pratt 1-yard run (Valentino Ambrosio kick), 12:34. Green Wave 56–14. Drive: 8 plays, 71 yards, 4:19.
- SMU – Collin Rogers 30-yard field goal, 7:55. Green Wave 56–17. Drive: 13 plays, 62 yards, 4:39.
- TULN – Valentino Ambrosio 33-yard field goal, 3:40. Green Wave 59–17. Drive: 7 plays, 42 yards, 4:15.
- SMU – Roderick Daniels Jr. 2-yard run (Collin Rogers kick), 0:51. Green Wave 59–24. Drive: 9 plays, 75 yards, 2:49.

Top passers

- SMU – Tanner Mordecai – 32/50, 298 yards, 2 TD, 2 INT
- TULN – Michael Pratt – 9/14, 141 yards, 3 TD

Top rushers

- SMU – Tyler Lavine – 18 rushes, 82 yards
- TULN – Tyjae Spears – 13 rushes, 121 yards, 2 TD

Top receivers

- SMU – Tyler Lavine – 7 receptions, 62 yards
- TULN – Shae Wyatt – 3 receptions, 104 yards, 2 TD

=== Memphis ===
Memphis Tigers at SMU Mustangs – Game summary

| Quarter | 1 | 2 | 3 | 4 | Total |
|---|---|---|---|---|---|
| Tigers | 7 | 10 | 6 | 8 | 31 |
| Mustangs | 0 | 14 | 10 | 10 | 34 |

at Gerald J. Ford Stadium, University Park, Texas

- Date: November 26
- Game time: 2:30 p.m. CST
- Game weather: Rain, 52 °F (11 °C)
- Game attendance: 15,759
- Referee: Kevin Randall
- TV announcers (ESPN2): Chris Cotter, Mark Herzlich, and Lericia Harris
- Box score, Recap

Game information

First quarter

- MEM – Sutton Smith 5-yard run (Chris Howard kick), 8:33. Tigers 7–0. Drive: 13 plays, 75 yards, 6:27.

Second quarter

- SMU – Jordan Kerley 4-yard pass from Tanner Mordecai (Collin Rogers kick), 13:47. Tied 7–7. Drive: 14 plays, 75 yards, 4:14.
- MEM – Asa Martin 3-yard run (Chris Howard kick), 10:51. Tigers 14–7. Drive: 6 plays, 65 yards, 2:50.
- SMU – Tyler Lavine 1-yard run (Collin Rogers kick), 1:15. Tied 14–14. Drive: 16 plays, 91 yards, 6:27.
- MEM – Chris Howard 42-yard field goal, 0:00. Tigers 17–14. Drive: 6 plays, 51 yards, 1:08.

Third quarter

- SMU – Tyler Lavine 3-yard run (Collin Rogers kick), 10:15. Mustangs 21–17. Drive: 10 plays, 75 yards, 4:45.
- SMU – Collin Rogers 27-yard field goal, 5:52. Mustangs 24–17. Drive: 9 plays, 27 yards, 3:22.
- MEM – Gabriel Rodgers 5-yard run (kick blocked), 0:00. Mustangs 24–23. Drive: 12 plays, 65 yards, 5:52.

Fourth quarter

- SMU – Rashee Rice 24-yard pass from Tanner Mordecai (Collin Rogers kick), 13:11. Mustangs 31–23. Drive: 4 plays, 49 yards, 1:42.
- SMU – Collin Rogers 23-yard field goal, 6:13. Mustangs 34–23. Drive: 12 plays, 66 yards, 4:32.
- MEM – Roc Taylor 7-yard pass from Seth Henigan (Seth Henigan pass to Gabriel Rodgers), 2:36. Mustangs 34–31. Drive: 12 plays, 70 yards, 3:30.

Top passers

- MEM – Seth Henigan – 27/44, 287 yards, TD, INT
- SMU – Tanner Mordecai – 22/30, 228 yards, 2 TD

Top rushers

- MEM – Jevyon Ducker – 10 rushes, 81 yards
- SMU – Tyler Lavine – 25 rushes, 64 yards, 2 TD

Top receivers

- MEM – Javon Ivory – 6 receptions, 98 yards
- SMU – Rashee Rice – 13 receptions, 147 yards, TD

=== Vs. BYU (New Mexico Bowl) ===
SMU Mustangs vs. BYU Cougars (New Mexico Bowl) – Game summary

| Quarter | 1 | 2 | 3 | 4 | Total |
|---|---|---|---|---|---|
| Mustangs | 10 | 0 | 0 | 13 | 23 |
| Cougars | 7 | 3 | 14 | 0 | 24 |

at University Stadium, Albuquerque, New Mexico

- Date: December 17
- Game time: 6:30 p.m. CST/5:30 p.m. MST
- Game weather: Clear, 34 °F (1 °C)
- Game attendance: 22,209
- Referee: Ted Pitts
- TV announcers (ABC/ESPN Radio): Tom Hart, Brock Osweiler, and Taylor McGregor/Jay Alter and Dave Steckel
- Box score, Recap

Game information

First quarter

- SMU – Collin Rogers 35-yard field goal, 12:01. Mustangs 3–0. Drive: 11 plays, 57 yards, 2:59.
- BYU – Sol-Jay Maiava-Peters 1-yard run (Jake Oldroyd kick), 6:09. Cougars 7–3. Drive: 11 plays, 73 yards, 5:52.
- SMU – Roderick Daniels Jr. 9-yard pass from Tanner Mordecai (Collin Rogers kick), 2:16. Mustangs 10–7. Drive: 12 plays, 75 yards, 3:53.

Second quarter

- BYU – Jake Oldroyd 31-yard field goal, 3:34. Tied 10–10. Drive: 14 plays, 66 yards, 7:11.

Third quarter

- BYU – Ben Bywater 76-yard interception return (Jake Oldroyd kick), 8:17. Cougars 17–10.
- BYU – Christopher Brooks 22-yard run (Jake Oldroyd kick), 1:22. Cougars 24–10. Drive: 9 plays, 82 yards, 5:43.

Fourth quarter

- SMU – Tyler Lavine 3-yard run (Collin Rogers kick), 12:39. Cougars 24–17. Drive: 11 plays, 75 yards, 3:42.
- SMU – Jordan Kerley 12-yard pass from Tanner Mordecai (run failed), 0:08. Cougars 24–23. Drive: 14 plays, 88 yards, 2:53.

Top passers

- SMU – Tanner Mordecai – 27/37, 218 yards, 2 TD, INT
- BYU – Sol-Jay Maiava-Peters – 7/12, 47 yards, INT

Top rushers

- SMU – Tyler Lavine – 23 rushes, 91 yards, TD
- BYU – Sol-Jay Maiava-Peters – 14 rushes, 96 yards, TD

Top receivers

- SMU – Moochie Dixon – 6 receptions, 60 yards
- BYU – Isaac Rex – 1 reception, 27 yards

== Weekly awards ==
- The American offensive player of the week

Tanner Mordecai (week 9 vs. Houston)
