= 2022 Houston vs. SMU football game =

2022 American college football game

- Conference game
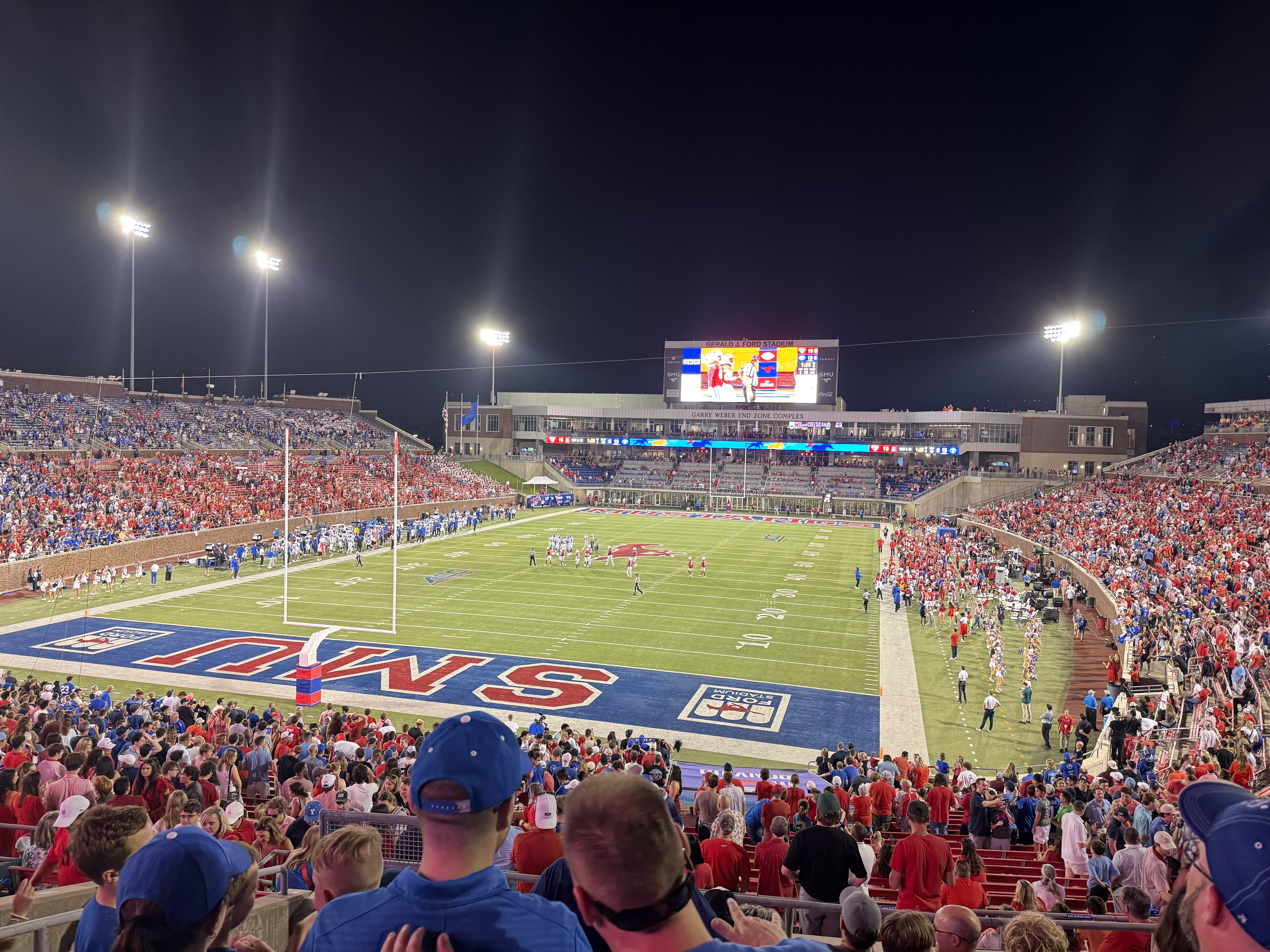
- Gerald J. Ford Stadium in University Park, Texas, where the game was played
Houston Cougars	SMU Mustangs
(5–3)	(4–4)
63	77
Head coach: Dana Holgorsen	Head coach: Rhett Lashlee
	1	2	3	4	Total
Houston	14	21	14	14	63
SMU	21	35	7	14	77
- Date: November 5, 2022
- Season: 2022
- Stadium: Gerald J. Ford Stadium
- Location: University Park, Texas
- Favorite: SMU by 3.5
- Referee: Luke Richmond
- Attendance: 23,841

United States TV coverage
- Network: NFLN
- Announcers: Jason Ross, Jr., Tyoka Jackson

The 2022 Houston vs. SMU football game was a regular-season college football game between the Houston Cougars and the SMU Mustangs, played on November 5, 2022 at Gerald J. Ford Stadium in University Park, Texas. The game holds the record for the most combined points scored in an NCAA Division I Football Bowl Subdivision (FBS) regulation game with 140 total points, breaking the previous record (137 points, set in a 2016 game played between Syracuse and Pittsburgh) by three points.

== Before the game ==
This was the 37th meeting between the Cougars and Mustangs, with Houston leading the series 22–13–1. The last meeting between the teams was on October 30, 2021, with the Cougars winning 44–37. In September 2021, it was announced that the Cougars accepted a bid to join the Big 12 Conference along with fellow American members Cincinnati and UCF. The schools had been under contract with The American through 2024, but reached an agreement that would allow them to join the Big 12 in 2023.

=== Houston ===
The Houston Cougars, led by fourth-year head coach Dana Holgorsen, entered the game with a record of 5–3, 3–1 in AAC play. The Cougars entered the season ranked no. 24 in the AP's pre-season poll, but dropped to no. 25 after a 37–35 triple overtime victory over UTSA in week 1. The following week, Houston lost to Texas Tech 30–33 in double overtime and dropped out of the rankings as a result. The Cougars would lose again the following week, 30–48 to Kansas, before winning four of their next five, including a 33–32 comeback victory over Memphis.

=== SMU ===
The SMU Mustangs, led by first-year head coach Rhett Lashlee, entered the game with a record of 4–4, 2–2 in AAC play. The Mustangs started the season 2–0, but lost their next three games. SMU snapped its losing streak with a 40–34 victory over rival Navy. The Mustangs lost their next game, 27–29, to then no. 21 Cincinnati, then defeated Tulsa 45–34 the following week.

== Game summary ==
=== Game information ===
Game Time	Weather
Kickoff: 6:03 p.m. CDT; End of Game: 9:58 p.m. CDT; Duration: 3 hours, 55 minutes	Temperature: 64 °F (18 °C); Wind: SE 10 mph Weather: Sunny
Game officials
L. Richmond (referee), J. Pennucci (umpire), D. Harrington (linesman), A. Amaya (line judge); C. Bilkowski (back judge), B. Vasconcells (field judge), J. Walker (side judge)

=== Scoring summary ===
Scoring summary

Quarter	Time	Drive			Team	Scoring information	Score	
Quarter	Time	Plays	Yards	TOP	Team	Scoring information	HOU	SMU
1	13:02	4	41	1:51	SMU	Ben Redding 2-yard touchdown reception from Tanner Mordecai, Collin Rogers kick good	0	7
1	10:29	5	78	2:29	HOU	Clayton Tune 55-yard touchdown run, Kyle Ramsey kick good	7	7
1	7:36	9	75	2:53	SMU	Rashee Rice 6-yard touchdown reception from Tanner Mordecai, Collin Rogers kick good	7	14
1	4:57	6	55	2:32	HOU	Sam Brown 12-yard touchdown reception from Clayton Tune, Kyle Ramsey kick good	14	14
1	2:06	8	75	2:51	SMU	Rashee Rice 9-yard touchdown reception from Tanner Mordecai, Collin Rogers kick good	14	21
2	14:53	4	75	2:13	HOU	Nathaniel Dell 22-yard touchdown reception from Clayton Tune, Kyle Ramsey kick good	21	21
2	11:53	8	68	2:55	SMU	Dylan Goffney 35-yard touchdown reception from Tanner Mordecai, Collin Rogers kick good	21	28
2	8:43	8	27	2:45	SMU	Tanner Mordecai 2-yard touchdown run, Collin Rogers kick good	21	35
2	6:44	5	22	1:36	SMU	R. J. Maryland 1-yard touchdown reception from Tanner Mordecai, Collin Rogers kick good	21	42
2	5:34	4	40	1:01	HOU	KeSean Carter 37-yard touchdown reception from Clayton Tune, Kyle Ramsey kick good	28	42
2	4:16	3	62	1:13	SMU	Ben Redding 10-yard touchdown reception from Tanner Mordecai, Collin Rogers kick good	28	49
2	1:25	5	65	2:48	HOU	Matthew Golden 42-yard touchdown reception from Clayton Tune, Kyle Ramsey kick good	35	49
2	0:36	5	63	0:44	SMU	Ben Redding 4-yard touchdown reception from Tanner Mordecai, Collin Rogers kick good	35	56
3	11:17	7	60	3:37	HOU	Nathaniel Dell 2-yard touchdown reception from Clayton Tune, Kyle Ramsey kick good	42	56
3	8:11	11	75	3:06	SMU	R. J. Maryland 3-yard touchdown reception from Tanner Mordecai, Collin Rogers kick good	42	63
3	1:28	9	89	4:00	HOU	Christian Trahan 1-yard touchdown reception from Clayton Tune, Kyle Ramsey kick good	49	63
4	12:52	7	74	3:30	SMU	Moochie Dixon 43-yard touchdown reception from Tanner Mordecai, Collin Rogers kick good	49	70
4	9:32	9	66	3:15	HOU	Sam Brown 6-yard touchdown reception from Clayton Tune, Kyle Ramsey kick good	56	70
4	5:13	7	50	4:17	SMU	Tyler Lavine 15-yard touchdown run, Collin Rogers kick good	56	77
4	3:37	4	75	1:36	HOU	Stacy Sneed 52-yard touchdown run, Kyle Ramsey kick good	63	77
"TOP" = time of possession. For other American football terms, see Glossary of American football.							63	77

=== Game statistics ===
==== Team statistics ====
Statistics	Houston	SMU
First downs	34	31
Total yards	710	642
Rushes–yards	17–182	46–263
Passing yards	528	379
Passing: Comp–Att–Int	37–54–3	28–37–0
Time of possession	28:28	31:32

==== Game leaders ====
Team	Category	Player	Statistics
Houston	Passing	Clayton Tune	36/53, 527 yards, 7 TD, 3 INT
Houston	Rushing	Clayton Tune	12 rushes, 111 yards, TD
Houston	Receiving	Nathaniel Dell	13 receptions, 180 yards, 2 TD
SMU	Passing	Tanner Mordecai	28/37, 379 yards, 9 TD
SMU	Rushing	Tyler Lavine	25 rushes, 146 yards, TD
SMU	Receiving	Dylan Goffney	3 receptions, 100 yards, TD

== Analysis ==
The two teams combined for 1,352 yards of offense, with 907 passing yards while three Houston receivers finished the game with more than 100 receiving yards. SMU quarterback Tanner Mordecai threw for a school-record 9 touchdowns. Additionally, the Mustangs broke the school record for most points scored in a game, with the previous record being 72.

This was the last meeting between the Cougars and Mustangs as conference opponents. Houston departed for the Big 12 at the end of the 2022–23 academic year, and SMU joined the Atlantic Coast Conference on July 1, 2024.

== See also ==
- 2012 Baylor vs. West Virginia football game, the highest scoring game between two ranked teams in FBS history, coincidentally also involved Dana Holgorsen.
- 2016 Syracuse vs. Pittsburgh football game, the previous record-holder for highest scoring NCAA Division I regulation football game, totaling 137 points.
- 2018 LSU vs. Texas A&M football game, the record-holder for highest-scoring game in FBS history, with 146 combined points. The game went to seven overtimes.
