= 2012 Baylor vs. West Virginia football game =

Notable college football game

- Conference game
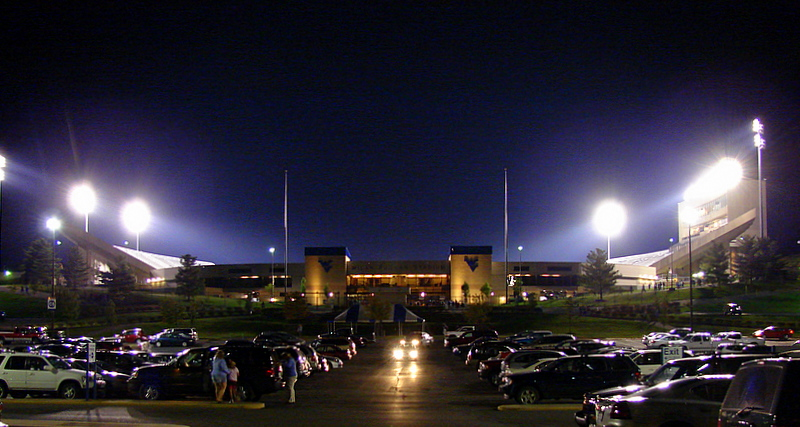
- Milan Puskar Stadium in Morgantown, West Virginia, where the game was played
Baylor Bears	West Virginia Mountaineers
(3–0)	(3–0)
63	70
Head coach: Art Briles	Head coach: Dana Holgorsen
AP / Coaches; 25 / 24	AP / Coaches; 9 / 7
	1	2	3	4	Total
Baylor	14	21	7	21	63
West Virginia	14	21	21	14	70
- Date: September 29, 2012
- Season: 2012
- Stadium: Milan Puskar Stadium
- Location: Morgantown, West Virginia
- Referee: Reggie Smith
- Attendance: 60,012

United States TV coverage
- Network: FX
- Announcers: Craig Bolerjack (Play-by-play), Joel Klatt (Color) & Petros Papadakis (Sideline)

The 2012 Baylor vs. West Virginia football game was a regular-season college football game between the Baylor Bears (ranked 25) and the West Virginia Mountaineers (ranked 9). The game was played at Milan Puskar Stadium on September 29, 2012, in Morgantown, West Virginia. West Virginia defeated Baylor 70–63 in the first ever matchup between the two schools. The game was tied at 35 apiece heading into halftime; afterwards, West Virginia scored three straight touchdowns to take a 21-point lead. Baylor closed the gap to 56–49 in the fourth quarter, but West Virginia scored two more touchdowns to put the game out of reach. The game set numerous NCAA and Big 12 records, including the highest-scoring game between two ranked teams in FBS history, (Note: While the 2018 LSU vs. Texas A&M game was technically also a ranked matchup, Texas A&M was not ranked in the AP Poll at the time of the game, as they had only received votes; hence, it did not count.) and the highest-scoring game in Big 12 history, with a combined 133 points scored.

== Background ==
=== Baylor ===
After losing Heisman-winning quarterback Robert Griffin III to the NFL, 5th year head coach Art Briles and freshman quarterback Nick Florence, who had served as Griffin's backup the previous season, led Baylor to an undefeated record in their first three games, with wins over SMU, No. 2 ranked Sam Houston State, and Louisiana Monroe, which expanded on a 9-game winning streak dating back to the 2011 season. Florence threw for over 300 passing yards in each of those games, with 341 vs. SMU, 312 vs. Sam Houston State, and 351 vs. Louisiana Monroe. Florence led the nation in total offense, with 387.7 yards per game, and ranked second in the Big 12 in passing yards, with 334.7 per game. It was the first conference game for Baylor, and the first time they would ever face off against West Virginia.

=== West Virginia ===
The 2012 season was the very first season that West Virginia was in the Big 12, as they had switched from the Big East after 2011. West Virginia was coming off a dominant win in the 2012 Orange Bowl against Clemson at the conclusion of their 2011 season. West Virginia quarterback Geno Smith was one of the frontrunners to win the Heisman Trophy, as he had not thrown an interception in the first three games and threw for 12 touchdown passes and 900 passing yards. Under second-year head coach Dana Holgorsen, West Virginia defeated in-state rival Marshall in week 1, James Madison in week 2, and Maryland in week 3, which made them ranked number 9 heading into their week 4 matchup with Baylor.

== Game summary ==
=== Score summary ===
Scoring summary

Quarter	Time	Drive			Team	Scoring information	Score	
Quarter	Time	Plays	Yards	TOP	Team	Scoring information	BAY	WVU
1	9:12	5	65	1:32	BAY	Jarred Salubi 1-yard touchdown run, Aaron Jones kick good	7	0
1	5:32	9	75	3:40	WVU	Andrew Buie 1-yard touchdown run, Tyler Bitancurt kick good	7	7
1	2:39	9	54	2:53	BAY	Glasco Martin 7-yard touchdown run, Aaron Jones kick good	14	7
1	0:42	6	60	1:57	WVU	J. D. Woods 7-yard touchdown reception from Geno Smith, Tyler Bitancurt kick good	14	14
2	9:00	4	23	1:03	BAY	Glasco Martin 1-yard touchdown run, Aaron Jones kick good	21	14
2	6:55	6	75	2:05	WVU	Stedman Bailey 47-yard touchdown reception from Geno Smith, Tyler Bitancurt kick good	21	21
2	6:21	2	68	0:34	BAY	Tevin Reese 65-yard touchdown reception from Nick Florence, Aaron Jones kick good	28	21
2	4:54	5	59	1:27	WVU	Stedman Bailey 20-yard touchdown reception from Geno Smith, Tyler Bitancurt kick good	28	28
2	0:29	8	87	1:58	WVU	Stedman Bailey 2-yard touchdown reception from Geno Smith, Tyler Bitancurt kick good	28	35
2	0:00	2	65	0:29	BAY	Lanear Sampson 67-yard touchdown reception from Nick Florence, Aaron Jones kick good	35	35
3	12:31	7	75	2:29	WVU	Tavon Austin 45-yard touchdown reception from Geno Smith, Tyler Bitancurt kick good	35	42
3	9:13	7	48	2:48	WVU	Tavon Austin 52-yard touchdown reception from Geno Smith, Tyler Bitancurt kick good	35	49
3	5:16	7	71	2:40	WVU	Andrew Buie 1-yard touchdown run, Tyler Bitancurt kick good	35	56
3	3:18	9	94	1:58	BAY	Terrance Williams 37-yard touchdown reception from Nick Florence, Aaron Jones kick good	42	56
4	14:14	11	63	3:08	BAY	Nick Florence 1-yard touchdown run, Aaron Jones kick good	49	56
4	13:55	1	87	0:19	WVU	Stedman Bailey 87-yard touchdown reception from Geno Smith, Tyler Bitancurt kick good	49	63
4	10:49	11	86	3:06	BAY	Antwaan Goodley 7-yard touchdown reception from Nick Florence, Aaron Jones kick good	56	63
4	5:55	10	75	4:54	WVU	Stedman Bailey 39-yard touchdown reception from Geno Smith, Tyler Bitancurt kick good	56	70
4	3:08	10	75	2:47	BAY	Terrance Williams 8-yard touchdown reception from Nick Florence, Aaron Jones kick good	63	70
"TOP" = time of possession. For other American football terms, see Glossary of American football.							63	70

=== Game statistics ===
==== Team statistics ====
Stat	Baylor	West Virginia
First Downs	34	33
Rushing	5	5
Passing	22	19
Penalty	1	3
Total Offense	700	807
Rushing	119	151
Passing	581	656
Rushing Att–TD (Avg.)	45–4 (11.25)	25–2(12.50)
Passing Comp/Att (TD–Int)	29/47 (5–1)	45/51 (8–0)
Fumbles–Lost	1–0	0–0
Penalties–Yards	6–56	6–78
Punts–Yards	2–92	2–76
Avg per Punt	46	38
Time of Possession	25:04	33:55
3rd Down Conversions	11/16	12/15
4th Down Conversions	1/1	0/0
PATs–Attempts	9–9	10–10
Field Goals–Attempts (Long)	0–2 (33)	0–1 (50)

==== Game leaders ====
Team	Category	Player	Statistics
Baylor	Passing	Nick Florence	29/47, 581 yards, 5 TD, 1 INT
Baylor	Rushing	Jarred Salubi	20 carries, 75 yards, 1 TD
Baylor	Receiving	Terrance Williams	17 receptions, 314 yards, 2 TD
West Virginia	Passing	Geno Smith	45/51, 656 yards, 8TD
West Virginia	Rushing	Andrew Buie	25 carries, 82 yards, 2 TD
West Virginia	Receiving	Stedman Bailey	13 receptions, 303 yards, 5 TD

== Records ==
=== FBS and Big 12 records ===
- Highest scoring game between two ranked teams in FBS history (133 points)
- First FBS game with two 300-yard receivers (Terrance Williams; 314) (Stedman Bailey; 303)
- Most touchdown passes in a game by a Big 12 quarterback (Geno Smith; 8)
- Most receiving yards in a game by a Big 12 receiver (Terrance Williams, 314)

=== School records ===
- Most passing yards in a game by a West Virginia quarterback (Geno Smith, 656)
- Most receiving touchdowns in a game by a West Virginia receiver (Stedman Bailey; 5)
- Most passing yards in a game by a Baylor quarterback (Nick Florence; 581)

== Aftermath ==
Both teams would go on to finish the season unranked. West Virginia suffered five straight losses after this game, including a 55–14 loss to Kansas State that effectively knocked Smith out of the Heisman Trophy race. West Virginia finished the season 7–6, which ended in a loss to former Big East rival Syracuse in the 2012 Pinstripe Bowl. Baylor would go on to upset Kansas State, which was ranked No. 1 in the country at the time, en route to an 8–5 finish with a win against UCLA in the 2012 Holiday Bowl.

== See also ==
- 2007 Navy vs. North Texas football game
- 2016 Syracuse vs. Pittsburgh football game
- 2018 LSU vs. Texas A&M football game
- 2022 Houston vs. SMU football game
