= 2016 Syracuse vs. Pittsburgh football game =

2016 American college football game

- Conference game
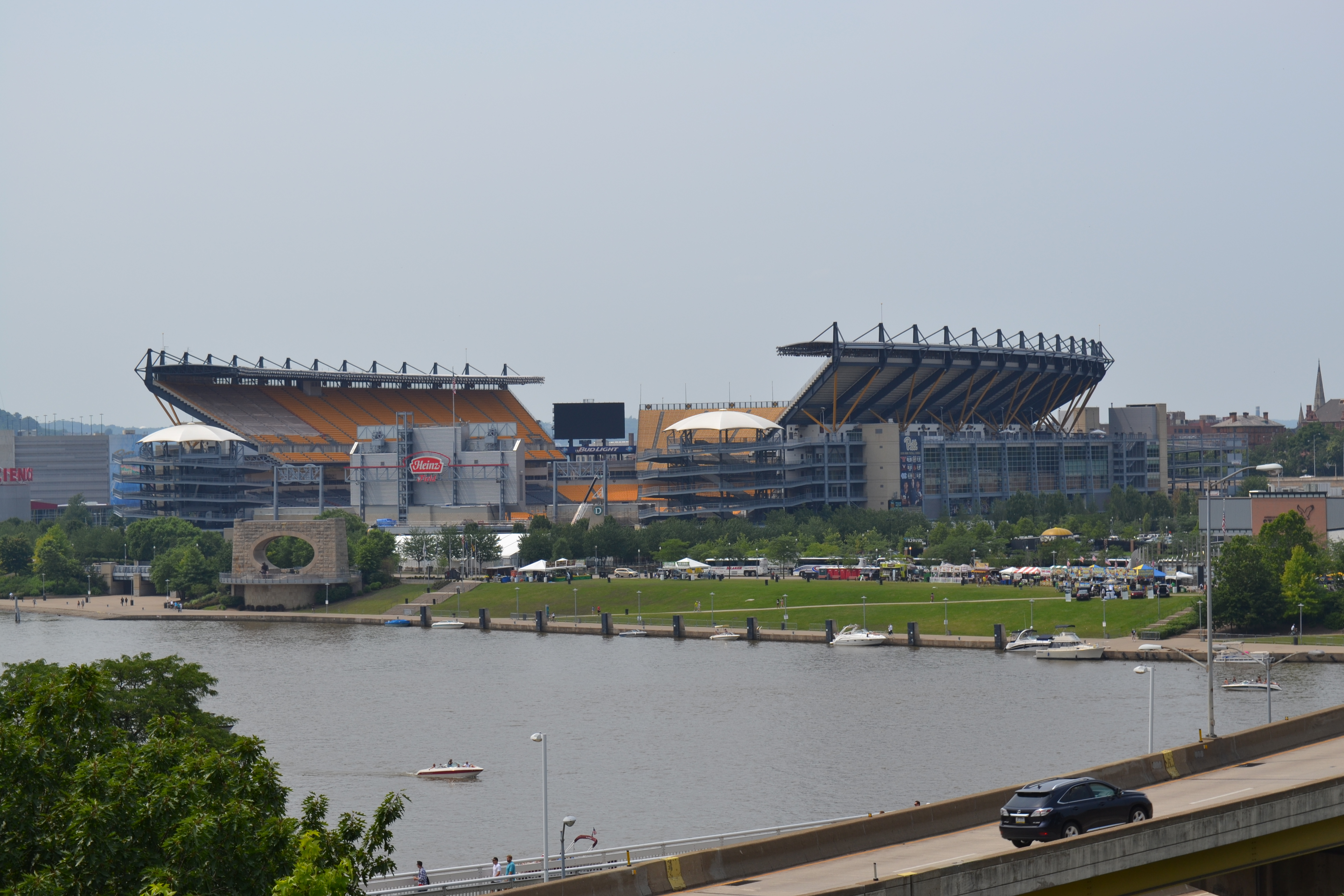
- Heinz Field in Pittsburgh, where the game was played
Syracuse Orange	Pittsburgh Panthers
(4–7)	(7–4)
61	76
Head coach: Dino Babers	Head coach: Pat Narduzzi
	1	2	3	4	Total
Syracuse	14	7	13	27	61
Pittsburgh	14	21	21	20	76
- Date: November 26, 2016
- Season: 2016
- Stadium: Heinz Field
- Location: Pittsburgh, Pennsylvania
- Referee: Jeff Heaser
- Attendance: 34,049

The 2016 Syracuse vs. Pittsburgh football game was a regular-season college football game between the Syracuse Orange and the Pittsburgh Panthers, played on November 26, 2016, at Heinz Field in Pittsburgh, Pennsylvania. The game held the record for the most combined points scored in an NCAA Division I Football Bowl Subdivision (FBS) regulation game (Note: A "regulation game" is one that does not go into overtime.) with 137 total points, breaking the previous record (136 points, set in a 2007 game played between Navy and North Texas) by a single point. The record was broken on November 5, 2022 when the SMU Mustangs defeated the Houston Cougars 77–63 for a combined 140 points. Oddly, this game aired on Pittsburgh ABC affiliate WTAE-TV's main signal, while the one between Michigan and Ohio State aired on ESPN2 and on the This TV digital subchannel the station had at the time.

== Before the game ==
=== Syracuse ===
With first-year head coach Dino Babers in command, the Syracuse Orange entered their final game of 2016 with a record of 4–7, 2–5 in ACC play. The Orange had experienced ups and downs throughout the 2016 season, with peaks including wins against seventeenth-ranked Virginia Tech and rival Boston College a week later. However, the lows of the season tended to outweigh the highs, as the Orange defense had allowed at least 20 points in all but two games, and the team had suffered blowout losses at the hands of nationally ranked Louisville (No. 13), Clemson (No. 3), and Florida State (No. 17). The aforementioned loss to Florida State was Syracuse's seventh of the season, which put a bowl game out of reach coming into their final game.

=== Pittsburgh ===
Under second-year head coach Pat Narduzzi, Pittsburgh entered this game 7–4, 4–3 in ACC play, having clinched a bowl game berth the week prior. The Panthers entered their final regular-season with a few very impressive wins on their schedule, namely an early-season win against eventual Big Ten champions Penn State and a road win against eventual national champions Clemson. These two victories proved to be the only two against ranked opponents, however, as they lost at home to No. 25 Virginia Tech on October 27. The Panthers offense had been doing its job throughout the 2016 season, scoring no less than 28 points in each of their previous 11 contests.

== Rivalry series ==
Coming into the game, the Pitt–Syracuse series stood 37–31 in favor of Pitt, with three ties; previously, the highest-scoring meeting in the series was a 45–28 Syracuse win in 1998, totaling 73 points. Pittsburgh had won the last three matchups; furthermore, Syracuse's last victory in Pittsburgh against the Panthers came in 2001, as their two victories in the series since then had come in Syracuse.

== Game summary ==
=== Game information ===
Game Time	Weather
Kickoff: 12:31 p.m. EST; End of Game: 4:14 p.m. EST; Duration: 3 hours, 43 minutes	Temperature: 38 °F (3 °C); Wind: W 13 mph Weather: Cloudy with showers
Game officials
J. Heaser (referee), M. Wilson (umpire), T. Lynch (linesman), D. Short (line judge); D. Bell (back judge), C. Clougherty (field judge), G. Hocker (side judge)

=== Scoring summary ===
Scoring summary

Quarter	Time	Drive			Team	Scoring information	Score	
Quarter	Time	Plays	Yards	TOP	Team	Scoring information	CUSE	PITT
1	7:42	7	45	2:13	CUSE	Zach Mahoney 2-yard touchdown run, Cole Murphy kick good	7	0
1	6:29	3	65	1:13	PITT	Jester Weah 59-yard touchdown reception from Nathan Peterman, Chris Blewitt kick good	7	7
1	3:35	1	35	0:08	PITT	James Conner 35-yard touchdown reception from Nathan Peterman, Chris Blewitt kick good	7	14
1	0:28	10	74	3:07	CUSE	Dontae Strickland 5-yard touchdown run, Cole Murphy kick good	14	14
2	10:36	10	65	4:52	PITT	George Aston 6-yard touchdown run, Chris Blewitt kick good	14	21
2	6:57	4	69	1:40	PITT	James Conner 9-yard touchdown run, Chris Blewitt kick good	14	28
2	1:36	14	68	5:21	CUSE	Amba Etta-Tawo 5-yard touchdown reception from Zack Mahoney, Cole Murphy kick good	21	28
2	0:10	8	64	1:26	PITT	Nathan Peterman 13-yard touchdown run, Chris Blewitt kick good	21	35
3	11:37				PITT	Interception returned 20 yards for touchdown by Dane Jackson, Chris Blewitt kick good	21	42
3	8:59	1	66	0:11	PITT	Quadree Henderson 66-yard touchdown run, Chris Blewitt kick good	21	49
3	7:54	4	85	1:05	CUSE	Moe Neal 42-yard touchdown run, Cole Murphy kick no good (blocked)	27	49
3	7:30	1	77	0:24	PITT	Maurice Ffrench 77-yard touchdown run, Chris Blewitt kick good	27	56
3	1:53	6	45	2:03	CUSE	Amba Etta-Tawo 12-yard touchdown reception from Zack Mahoney, Cole Murphy kick good	34	56
4	11:16	7	63	2:11	CUSE	Zack Mahoney 19-yard touchdown run, Cole Murphy kick good	41	56
4	9:33	3	78	1:43	PITT	Dontez Ford 79-yard touchdown reception from Nathan Peterman, Chris Blewitt kick good	41	63
4	7:21	7	65	2:12	CUSE	Amba Etta-Tawo 7-yard touchdown reception from Zack Mahoney, Cole Murphy kick good	48	63
4	5:06	5	44	2:15	PITT	Jester Weah 6-yard touchdown reception from Nathan Peterman, Chris Blewitt kick good	48	70
4	3:47	5	69	1:19	CUSE	Amba Etta-Tawo 49-yard touchdown reception from Zack Mahoney, Cole Murphy kick good	55	70
4	3:15	2	43	0:32	PITT	James Conner 1-yard touchdown run, Chris Blewitt kick no good	55	76
4	0:58	10	77	2:17	CUSE	Amba Etta-Tawo 13-yard touchdown reception from Zack Mahoney, Cole Murphy kick no good	61	76
"TOP" = time of possession. For other American football terms, see Glossary of American football.							61	76

=== Game statistics ===
==== Team statistics ====
Stat	Syracuse	Pittsburgh
First Downs	38	20
Rushing	14	12
Passing	21	7
Penalty	3	1
Total Offense	668	644
Rushing	228	393
Passing	440	251
Rushing Att–TD (Avg.)	45–4 (5.1)	40–6 (9.8)
Passing Comp/Att (TD–Int)	43/61 (5–1)	9/19 (4–1)
Fumbles–Lost	0–0	1–1
Penalties–Yards	7–50	7–64
Punts–Yards	6–268	3–129
Avg per Punt	44.7	43
Time of Possession	35:42	24:18
3rd Down Conversions	9/20	7/11
4th Down Conversions	4/4	0/0
PATs–Attempts	7–9	10–11
Field Goals–Attempts (Long)	0–0	0–0

==== Game leaders ====
Team	Category	Player	Statistics
Syracuse	Passing	Zack Mahoney	43/61, 440 yards, 5 TD, 1 INT
Syracuse	Rushing	Moe Neal	8 carries, 91 yards, 1 TD
Syracuse	Receiving	Amba Etta-Tawo	13 receptions, 178 yards, 5 TD
Pittsburgh	Passing	Nathan Peterman	9/18, 251 yards, 4 TD, 1 INT
Pittsburgh	Rushing	James Conner	19 carries, 115 yards, 2 TD
Pittsburgh	Receiving	Jester Weah	4 receptions, 99 yards, 2 TD

== Aftermath ==
This game was Syracuse's last of the season, as they finished the 2016 campaign with a 4–8 record. Pittsburgh improved to 8–4 and accepted an invitation to the New Era Pinstripe Bowl at Yankee Stadium. The Panthers were favored by five, but lost to Northwestern, 31–24 and finished their season with a record of 8–5.

== See also ==
- 2001 Arkansas vs. Ole Miss football game, the record-holder for longest NCAA Division I football game, one of five to reach at least seven overtimes.
- 2007 Navy vs. North Texas football game, the previous record-holder for highest scoring NCAA Division I regulation football game, totaling 136 points.
- 2012 Baylor vs. West Virginia football game, the highest scoring game between two ranked teams in FBS history, with 133 combined points.
- 2018 LSU vs. Texas A&M football game, the record-holder for highest-scoring game in FBS history, with 146 combined points. This game also reached seven overtimes.
- 2022 Houston vs. SMU football game, the current record holder for most points in an NCAA Division I regulation football game, with 140 points
