= College Football on NFL Network =

- Also known as: NFL Network College Football
- Genre: American college football game telecasts
- Presented by: Various commentators
- Country of origin: United States
- Original language: English
- No. of seasons: 21 (through 2026 season)

Production
- Production locations: Various NCAA stadiums (game telecasts); Hollywood Park; Inglewood, California, U.S. (pre-game, halftime and post-game shows)
- Camera setup: Multi-camera
- Running time: 210 minutes or until game ends (inc. adverts)
- Production companies: National Collegiate Athletic Association; National Football League (2006–2025); ESPN (2026–present)

Original release
- Network: NFL Network; NFL+
- Release: December 26, 2006 – present

Related
- NFL Network

College Football on NFL Network is the branding used for college football broadcasts of NCAA college football games that are broadcast by NFL Network.

NFL Network first began airing college football in 2006, when it acquired the rights to three postseason games: the Texas Bowl, the Insight Bowl and the Senior Bowl.

Currently, NFL Network airs the Black College Football Hall of Fame Classic, the East–West Shrine Bowl, the Senior Bowl and the HBCU Legacy Bowl.

== History ==
In 2006, NFL Network began a foray into televising college football bowl games, acquiring rights to the newly established Texas Bowl in Houston (whose management rights were held by the Houston Texans at the time), the Insight Bowl, as well as two all-star events—the Senior Bowl (which features prospects that had completed their college eligibility) and the Las Vegas All-American Classic (which, however, was canceled at the last minute due to financial and sponsorship issues). These games were intended to help make NFL Network more attractive to television providers. The 2006 Insight Bowl, played between Minnesota and Texas Tech, would also achieve notoriety for featuring the largest comeback victory in Division I FBS bowl game history, with Texas Tech coming back from a 38–7 third-quarter deficit to win 44–41 in overtime. Due to concerns that many cable carriers did not carry NFL Network, its bowl games were also simulcast on local over-the-air networks and cable providers.

On April 14, 2007, the network televised the Nebraska Cornhuskers' spring football game. The network again aired the Insight, Texas and Senior bowls in late 2007 and early 2008. Prior to the start of the season, NFL Network debuted College Football Now. A daily studio show covering college football. In addition, it carried two games between historically black colleges and universities during the 2007 season, including the Circle City Classic at the RCA Dome in Indianapolis, Indiana, the first regular season game to air on the network. The Circle City Classic also aired on NFL Network in 2008. In 2009, the Texas Bowl moved to ESPN. In 2010, the Insight Bowl did the same. In 2011, NFL Network began airing the East–West Shrine Bowl.

Since 2019, NFL Network has annually carried the Black College Football Hall of Fame Classic, a college football kickoff game that features a matchup of two historically black colleges and universities (HBCUs) on the Sunday before Labor Day. The HBCU Legacy Bowl, a postseason all-star game involving draft-eligible HBCU players, also has broadcast rights held by NFL Network. In May 2019, NFL Network announced a four-year deal with Conference USA to air a weekly regular-season game on Saturday afternoons beginning in the 2019 season. NFL Network opted out of the agreement after one season.

In the 2022 season, NFL Network returned to carrying regular college football games through a weekly sub-license agreement with ESPN. Games feature host teams from the Sun Belt Conference, Mid-American Conference, Conference USA, and American Athletic Conference. In 2023, NFL Network began airing the Brick City HBCU Kickoff Classic, and began simulcasting all games on NFL+.

NFL Network lost the ESPN sublicense prior to the 2024 season, leaving the Black College Football Hall of Fame Classic as NFL Network's only regular season game.

== Rights ==
=== Current Rights ===
- Senior Bowl (2007–present)
- East–West Shrine Bowl (2011–present)
- Black College Football Hall of Fame Classic (2019–present)
- HBCU Legacy Bowl (2022–present)
- Brick City HBCU Kickoff Classic (2023–present)

=== Past Rights ===
- Texas Bowl (2006–2008)
- Insight Bowl (2006–2009)
- Nebraska Cornhuskers football spring game (2007)
- Circle City Classic (2007–2008)
- Conference USA (2019)
- Ten MAC, C-USA, Sun Belt Conference and AAC games via ESPN sub-license (2022–2023)
