= East Carolina Pirates football statistical leaders =

The East Carolina Pirates football statistical leaders are individual statistical leaders of the East Carolina Pirates football program in various categories, including passing, rushing, receiving, total offense, defensive stats, and kicking. Within those areas, the lists identify single-game, single-season, and career leaders. The Pirates represent East Carolina University in the NCAA Division I FBS American Conference.

East Carolina began competing in intercollegiate football in 1932. However, these lists are dominated by more recent players for several reasons:

- Since 1932, seasons have increased from 10 games to 11 and then 12 games in length.
- The NCAA didn't allow freshmen to play varsity football until 1972 (with the exception of the World War II years), allowing players to have four-year careers.
- Bowl games only began counting toward single-season and career statistics in 2002. The Pirates have played in eight bowl games since then, and will play in a ninth in 2022, allowing players an extra game to accumulate statistics.
- The recent decade has seen two players set NCAA records: Justin Hardy, who caught 387 passes, more than anyone in all of college football ever had, until fellow Pirate Zay Jones broke the record in 2016. Jones also set the NCAA single-season record with 158 receptions, which is more than all but 2 other East Carolina receivers have ever had in their whole careers.
- Due to COVID-19 issues, the NCAA declared that the 2020 season would not be counted against the athletic eligibility of any football player, giving everyone who played in that season the opportunity for five years of eligibility instead of the normal four.
- Since 2018, players have been allowed to participate in as many as four games in a redshirt season; previously, playing in even one game "burned" the redshirt. Since 2024, postseason games have not counted against the four-game limit. These changes to redshirt rules have given very recent players several extra games to accumulate statistics.

The most recent East Carolina record books do not list a top 10 in all statistics, sometimes only listing a leader. These lists are updated through the end of the 2025 regular season.

== Passing ==
=== Passing yards ===
Career
Rank	Player	Yards	Years
1	Holton Ahlers	13,927	2018 2019 2020 2021 2022
2	Shane Carden	11,991	2012 2013 2014
3	David Garrard	9,029	1998 1999 2000 2001
4	James Pinkney	8,173	2003 2004 2005 2006
5	Marcus Crandell	7,198	1993 1994 1995 1996
6	Dominique Davis	7,192	2010 2011
7	Patrick Pinkney	6,980	2005 2006 2007 2008 2009
8	Katin Houser	5,306	2024 2025
9	Jeff Blake	5,133	1988 1989 1990 1991
10	Travis Hunter	3,928	1986 1987 1988 1989

Single season
Rank	Player	Yards	Year
1	Shane Carden	4,736	2014
2	Shane Carden	4,129	2013
3	Dominique Davis	3,967	2010
4	Holton Ahlers	3,708	2022
5	Holton Ahlers	3,387	2019
6	Katin Houser	3,300	2025
7	Dominique Davis	3,225	2011
8	Holton Ahlers	3,126	2021
9	Shane Carden	3,116	2012
10	Jeff Blake	3,073	1991

Single game
Rank	Player	Yards	Year	Opponent
1	Holton Ahlers	535	2019	Cincinnati
2	Holton Ahlers	498	2019	SMU
3	Shane Carden	480	2013	Tulane
4	Blake Kemp	465	2015	UCF
	Holton Ahlers	465	2022	South Florida
6	Holton Ahlers	449	2018	Memphis
7	Shane Carden	447	2013	Old Dominion
8	Shane Carden	445	2014	UConn
9	Shane Carden	439	2012	Marshall
10	Shane Carden	438	2014	North Carolina

=== Passing touchdowns ===
Career
Rank	Player	TDs	Years
1	Holton Ahlers	97	2018 2019 2020 2021 2022
2	Shane Carden	86	2012 2013 2014
3	Dominique Davis	62	2010 2011
4	David Garrard	60	1998 1999 2000 2001
5	Marcus Crandell	58	1993 1994 1995 1996
6	James Pinkney	46	2003 2004 2005 2006
7	Jeff Blake	43	1988 1989 1990 1991
8	Patrick Pinkney	39	2005 2006 2007 2008 2009
9	Katin Houser	37	2024 2025
10	Travis Hunter	32	1986 1987 1988 1989

Single season
Rank	Player	TDs	Year
1	Dominique Davis	37	2010
2	Shane Carden	33	2013
3	Shane Carden	30	2014
4	Jeff Blake	28	1991
	Holton Ahlers	28	2022
6	Dominique Davis	25	2011
7	Michael Anderson	23	1992
	Shane Carden	23	2012
9	Marcus Crandell	21	1994
	Holton Ahlers	21	2019

Single game
Rank	Player	TDs	Year	Opponent
1	Holton Ahlers	6	2019	SMU
	Holton Ahlers	6	2022	South Florida
3	Dominique Davis	5	2010	Tulsa
	Dominique Davis	5	2010	Navy
	Dominique Davis	5	2010	UAB
	Shane Carden	5	2012	Memphis
	Shane Carden	5	2013	Old Dominion
	Shane Carden	5	2013	Tulsa
	Shane Carden	5	2013	UAB
	Philip Nelson	5	2016	Western Carolina
	Holton Ahlers	5	2022	Coastal Carolina
	Katin Houser	5	2024	Temple
	Katin Houser	5	2024	Florida Atlantic

== Rushing ==
=== Rushing yards ===
Career
Rank	Player	Yards	Years
1	Junior Smith	3,745	1991 1992 1993 1994
2	Rahjai Harris	3,092	2020 2021 2022 2023 2024
3	Leonard Henry	3,089	1998 1999 2000 2001
4	Keaton Mitchell	3,027	2020 2021 2022
5	Chris Johnson	2,982	2004 2005 2006 2007
6	Carlester Crumpler Sr.	2,889	1971 1972 1973
7	Tony Baker	2,825	1982 1983 1984 1985
8	Theodore Sutton	2,730	1977 1978 1979 1980
9	Butch Colson	2,512	1967 1968 1969
10	Scott Harley	2,465	1995 1996 1997

Single season
Rank	Player	Yards	Year
1	Scott Harley	1,745	1996
2	Keaton (Deuce) Mitchell	1,452	2022
3	Leonard Henry	1,432	2001
4	Chris Johnson	1,423	2007
5	Junior Smith	1,352	1993
6	Carlester Crumpler Sr.	1,309	1972
7	Junior Smith	1,204	1993
8	Vintavious Cooper	1,193	2013
9	Dominique Lindsay	1,180	2009
10	Rahjai Harris	1,166	2024

Single game
Rank	Player	Yards	Year	Opponent
1	Scott Harley	351	1996	NC State
2	Chris Johnson	301	2007	Memphis
3	Scott Harley	291	1996	South Carolina
4	Junior Smith	282	1993	Tulsa
5	Billy Wightman	245	1969	Davidson
6	Leonard Henry	234	2001	Cincinnati
7	Junior Smith	232	1992	Arkansas State
8	Chris Johnson	223	2007	Boise State
9	Keaton Mitchell	222	2021	Tulane
	Keaton Mitchell	222	2022	Temple

=== Rushing touchdowns ===
Career
Rank	Player	TDs	Years
1	Carlester Crumpler Sr.	37	1971 1972 1973
2	Chris Johnson	32	2004 2005 2006 2007
3	Junior Smith	27	1991 1992 1993 1994
	Leonard Henry	29	1998 1999 2000 2001
	Rahjai Harris	29	2020 2021 2022 2023 2024
6	Butch Colson	27	1967 1968 1969
7	Tony Collins	26	1977 1978 1979 1980
8	Holton Ahlers	25	2018 2019 2020 2021 2022
	Keaton Mitchell	25	2020 2021 2022
10	Ken Strayhorn	24	1972 1973 1974 1975
	Shane Carden	24	2012 2013 2014

Single season
Rank	Player	TDs	Year
1	Dave Alexander	17	1965
	Carlester Crumpler Sr.	17	1972
	Chris Johnson	17	2007
4	Leonard Henry	16	2001
5	Butch Colson	15	1967
6	Tony Collins	14	1979
	Art Brown	14	2002
	Keaton Mitchell	14	2022
9	Vintavious Cooper	13	2013
10	Carlester Crumpler Sr.	12	1973
	Leander Green	12	1979

Single game
Rank	Player	TDs	Year	Opponent
1	Scott Harley	6	1996	Ohio

== Receiving ==
=== Receptions ===
Career
Rank	Player	Catches	Years
1	Zay Jones	399	2013 2014 2015 2016
2	Justin Hardy	387	2011 2012 2013 2014
3	Dwayne Harris	268	2007 2008 2009 2010
4	Tyler Snead	201	2018 2019 2020 2021
5	Trevon Brown	189	2014 2015 2016 2017 2018
6	C. J. Johnson	175	2019 2020 2021 2022
7	Jason Nichols	152	1994 1995 1996 1997
8	Lance Lewis	149	2010 2011
9	Aundrae Allison	145	2005 2006
10	Terrance Copper	139	2000 2001 2002 2003

Single season
Rank	Player	Catches	Year
1	Zay Jones	158	2016
2	Justin Hardy	121	2014
3	Justin Hardy	114	2013
4	Dwayne Harris	101	2010
5	Zay Jones	98	2015
6	Lance Lewis	89	2010
7	Justin Hardy	88	2012
	Isaiah Winstead	88	2022
9	Terrance Copper	87	2003
10	Aundrae Allison	83	2005
	Dwayne Harris	83	2009

Single game
Rank	Player	Catches	Year	Opponent
1	Zay Jones	22	2016	South Carolina
2	Zay Jones	19	2016	Connecticut
	Tyler Snead	19	2019	SMU
4	Zay Jones	18	2016	South Florida
5	Justin Hardy	17	2013	Tulane
	Zay Jones	17	2016	UCF
7	Justin Hardy	16	2012	Marshall
	Justin Hardy	16	2013	Old Dominion
	Tyler Snead	16	2019	UConn
	Tyler Snead	16	2020	Tulsa

=== Receiving yards ===
Career
Rank	Player	Yards	Years
1	Justin Hardy	4,541	2011 2012 2013 2014
2	Zay Jones	4,279	2013 2014 2015 2016
3	Dwayne Harris	3,001	2007 2008 2009 2010
4	Trevon Brown	2,952	2014 2015 2016 2017 2018
5	C. J. Johnson	2,849	2019 2020 2021 2022
6	Tyler Snead	2,374	2018 2019 2020 2021
7	Troy Smith	1,982	1995 1996 1997 1998
8	Anthony Smith	1,852	2024 2025
9	Davon Grayson	1,767	2013 2014 2015 2016 2017
10	Mitchell Galloway	1,754	1993 1994 1995 1996

Single season
Rank	Player	Yards	Year
1	Zay Jones	1,746	2016
2	Justin Hardy	1,494	2013
3	Justin Hardy	1,284	2013
4	Dwayne Harris	1,123	2010
	Trevon Brown	1,123	2018
6	Lance Lewis	1,116	2010
7	Justin Hardy	1,105	2012
8	Zay Jones	1,099	2015
9	Isaiah Winstead	1,085	2022
10	Trevon Brown	1,069	2017

Single game
Rank	Player	Yards	Year	Opponent
1	C.J. Johnson	283	2019	Cincinnati
2	Trevon Brown	270	2017	Cincinnati
3	Tyler Snead	240	2019	SMU
4	Justin Hardy	230	2013	Tulane
5	Cam Worthy	224	2014	Virginia Tech
6	Davon Grayson	223	2017	UConn
7	Terry Gallaher	218	1975	Appalachian State
8	Zay Jones	212	2016	Navy
9	Zay Jones	206	2016	Tulsa
10	C.J. Johnson	197	2022	South Florida

=== Receiving touchdowns ===
Career
Rank	Player	TDs	Years
1	Justin Hardy	35	2011 2012 2013 2014
2	Trevon Brown	24	2014 2015 2016 2017 2018
3	Zay Jones	23	2013 2014 2015 2016
4	Lance Lewis	22	2010 2011
5	Larry Shannon	21	1994 1995 1996 1997
	C.J. Johnson	21	2019 2020 2021 2022
7	Dwayne Harris	20	2007 2008 2009 2010
8	Tyler Snead	18	2018 2019 2020 2021
9	Clayton Driver	17	1989 1990 1991 1992
10	Walter Wilson	16	1986 1987 1988 1989

Single season
Rank	Player	TDs	Year
1	Lance Lewis	14	2010

Single game
Rank	Player	TDs	Year	Opponent
1	Walter Wilson	4	1989	Pittsburgh
	C.J. Johnson	4	2022	South Florida

== Total offense ==
Total offense is the sum of passing and rushing statistics. It does not include receiving or returns.

=== Total offense yards ===
Career
Rank	Player	Yards	Years
1	Holton Ahlers	15,373	2018 2019 2020 2021 2022
2	Shane Carden	12,244	2011 2012 2013 2014
3	David Garrard	10,238	1998 1999 2000 2001
4	James Pinkney	8,563	2003 2004 2005 2006
5	Marcus Crandell	7,641	1993 1994 1995 1996
6	Dominique Davis	7,505	2010 2011
7	Patrick Pinkney	7,417	2005 2006 2007 2008 2009
8	Katin Houser	5,669	2024 2025
9	Jeff Blake	5,618	1988 1989 1990 1991
10	Travis Hunter	5,196	1986 1987 1988 1989

Single season
Rank	Player	Yards	Year
1	Shane Carden	4,812	2014
2	Shane Carden	4,242	2013
3	Dominique Davis	4,108	2010
4	Holton Ahlers	3,890	2022
5	Holton Ahlers	3,746	2019
6	Katin Houser	3,493	2025
7	Dominique Davis	3,397	2011
8	Holton Ahlers	3,330	2021
9	Shane Carden	3,190	2012
10	Jeff Blake	3,182	1991

Single game
Rank	Player	Yards	Year	Opponent
1	Holton Ahlers	556	2019	Cincinnati
2	Holton Ahlers	523	2019	SMU
3	Holton Ahlers	506	2018	Memphis
4	Shane Carden	477	2014	UConn
5	Holton Ahlers	474	2022	South Florida
6	Blake Kemp	468	2015	UCF
7	Shane Carden	457	2014	SMU
8	Shane Carden	455	2013	Tulane
9	Marcus Crandell	453	1995	Syracuse
	Holton Ahlers	453	1995	Navy

=== Touchdowns responsible for ===
"Touchdowns responsible for" is the NCAA's official term for combined passing and rushing touchdowns.

Career
Rank	Player	TDs	Years
1	Holton Ahlers	122	2018 2019 2020 2021 2022
2	Shane Carden	110	2011 2012 2013 2014
3	David Garrard	81	1998 1999 2000 2001
4	Dominique Davis	76	2010 2011
5	Marcus Crandell	65	1993 1994 1995 1996
6	James Pinkney	57	2003 2004 2005 2006
7	Jeff Blake	51	1988 1989 1990 1991
8	Katin Houser	50	2024 2025
9	Travis Hunter	47	1986 1987 1988 1989
10	Patrick Pinkney	44	2005 2006 2007 2008 2009

Single season
Rank	Player	TDs	Year
1	Dominique Davis	46	2010
2	Shane Carden	43	2013
3	Shane Carden	36	2014
4	Holton Ahlers	34	2022
5	Jeff Blake	31	1991
	Shane Carden	31	2012
7	Dominique Davis	30	2011

Single game
Rank	Player	TDs	Year	Opponent
1	Shane Carden	7	2013	Tulsa

== Defense ==
The East Carolina media guides and record books have historically listed only the top performers in most defensive statistics, rather than a top 10. However, the 2022 record book lists a full top 10 in career tackles.

=== Interceptions ===
Career
Rank	Player	Ints	Years
1	Jim Bolding	22	1973 1974 1975 1976

Single season
Rank	Player	Ints	Year
1	Jim Bolding	10	1975

Single game
Rank	Player	Ints	Year	Opponent
1	10 times	3	Most recent: Greg Grandison, 1991 vs. UCF	

=== Tackles ===
Career
Rank	Player	Tackles	Years
1	Harold Randolph	493	1974 1975 1976 1977

Single season
Rank	Player	Tackles	Year
1	Jeffrey Warren	184	1980

Single game
Rank	Player	Tackles	Year	Opponent
1	Pernell Griffin	24	2001	Wake Forest
	Chris Moore	24	2003	Cincinnati

=== Sacks ===
Career
Rank	Player	Sacks	Years
1	Roderick Coleman	39.0	1995 1996 1997 1998

Single season
Rank	Player	Sacks	Year
1	Roderick Coleman	15.0	1997

Single game
Rank	Player	Sacks	Year	Opponent
1	Roderick Coleman	4.0	1997	Wake Forest
	Montese Overton	4.0	2015	SMU

== Kicking ==
=== Field goals made ===
Career
Rank	Player	FGs	Years
1	Jake Verity	74	2016 2017 2018 2019 2020
2	Ben Hartman	59	2006 2007 2008 2009
3	Jeff Heath	53	1982 1983 1984 1985
4	Kevin Miller	52	1999 2000 2001 2002

Single season
Rank	Player	FGs	Year
1	Jake Verity	24	2019
2	Ben Hartman	21	2008

Single game
Rank	Player	FGs	Year	Opponent
1	Andrew Conrad	5	2023	Florida Atlantic
2	12 times	4	Most recent: Noah Perez, 2026 vs. Memphis	

=== Field goal percentage ===
Minimum of 30 attempts for career leadership, and 15 for single-season leadership.

Career
Rank	Player	FG%	Years
1	Michael Barbour	80.0%	2010 2011

Single season
Rank	Player	FG%	Year
1	Jake Verity	90.5%	2019
