= Tyler Snead =

American football player (born 2000)

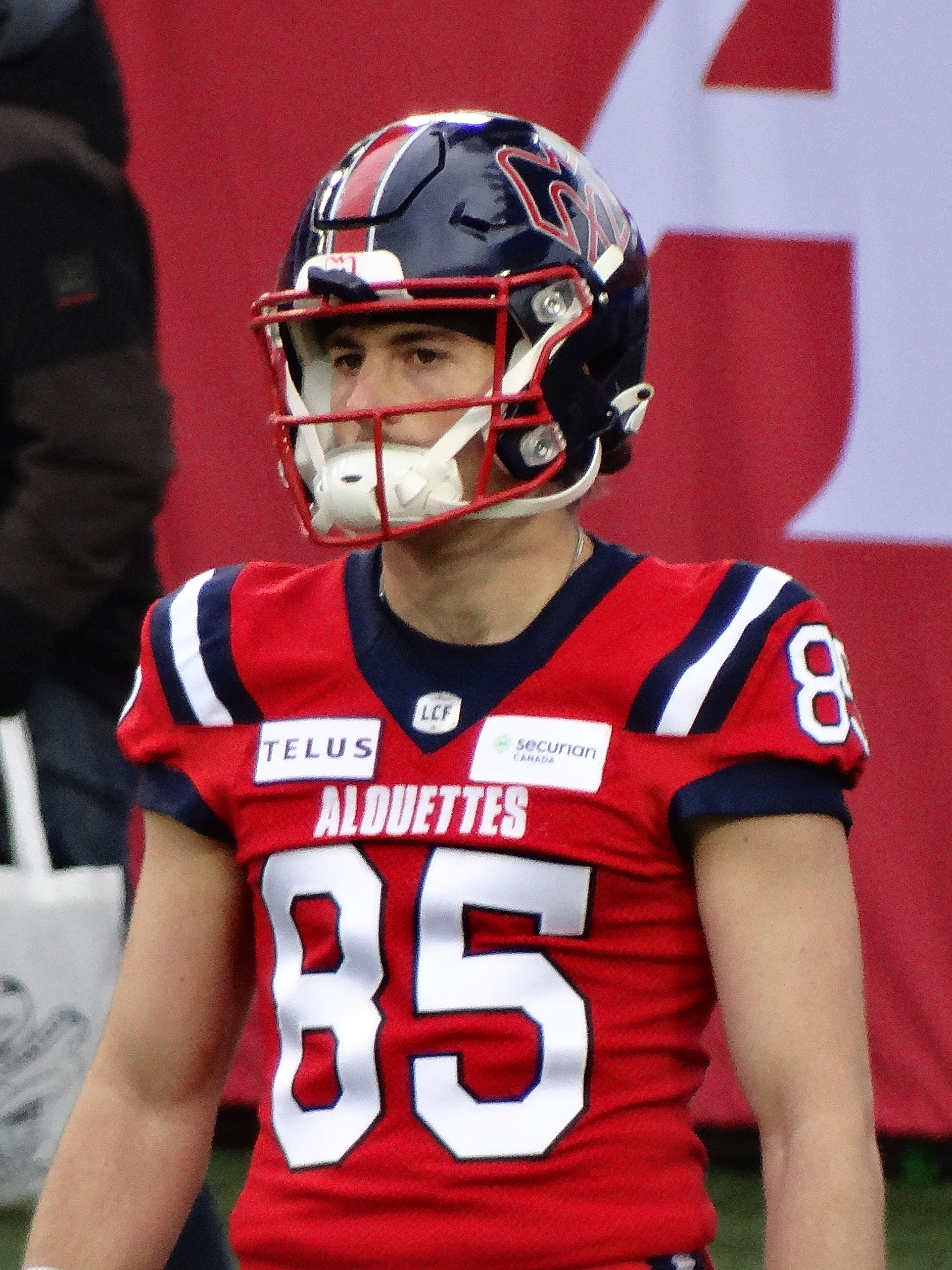
- Snead with the Montreal Alouettes in 2023

No. 85 – Montreal Alouettes
- Position: Wide receiver
- CFL status: American

Personal information
- Born: February 1, 2000 (age 26); Raleigh, North Carolina, U.S.
- Listed height: 5 ft 7 in (1.70 m)
- Listed weight: 187 lb (85 kg)

Career information
- High school: Millbrook (Raleigh, North Carolina)
- College: East Carolina (2018–2021)
- NFL draft: 2022: undrafted

Career history
- Pittsburgh Steelers (2022)*; Montreal Alouettes (2023–present)
- * Offseason or practice squad member only

Awards and highlights
- Grey Cup champion (2023); CFL All-Star (2025); 2x CFL East All-Star (2025, 2026); 2× Second-team All-AAC (2020, 2021)

Career CFL statistics as of 2026
- Receptions: 259
- Receiving yards: 3,644
- Receiving touchdowns: 22
- Rushing yards: 42
- Rushing touchdowns: 1
- Stats at CFL.ca
- Stats at Pro Football Reference

Tyler Snead (born February 1, 2000) is an American professional football wide receiver for the Montreal Alouettes of the Canadian Football League (CFL).

== College career ==
Snead played college football for the East Carolina Pirates from 2018 to 2021. Over four seasons, he appeared in 37 games with 30 starts and recorded 201 receptions for 2,374 yards and 18 touchdowns. He also rushed for 94 yards and one touchdown. In addition to his offensive production, Snead returned 60 kickoffs for 1,268 yards and two touchdowns and returned 37 punts for 260 yards, finishing his collegiate career with 3,996 all-purpose yards. He also completed 4 of 6 pass attempts for 137 yards and three touchdowns on trick plays.

As a true freshman in 2018, Snead appeared in four games while preserving his redshirt. He made his collegiate debut in Week 8 against Memphis, recording four receptions for 50 yards and a touchdown. The following week against Tulane, he posted his first 100-yard receiving game with five receptions for 124 yards before catching three touchdown passes on six receptions for 62 yards against UConn.

As a redshirt freshman in 2019, Snead appeared in all 12 games with seven starts. His breakout performance came in Week 10 against SMU, when he recorded 19 receptions for 240 yards and three touchdowns in a 59–51 loss. His 240 receiving yards ranked second in East Carolina's single-game record book at the time before teammate C. J. Johnson later surpassed it with a 283-yard performance, moving Sneads's mark to third in program history. The following week, Snead caught 16 passes for 126 yards in a 31–24 win over UConn. He finished the season with 66 receptions for 759 yards and five touchdowns while also returning a kickoff for a touchdown.

During the 2020 season, Snead started all nine games. In Week 2 against Georgia State, he caught 11 passes for 105 yards and scored on a 31-yard rushing touchdown. In Week 5 against Tulsa, he recorded 16 receptions for 108 yards and a touchdown. In the regular-season finale against SMU, he caught seven passes for 92 yards and threw a 35-yard touchdown pass in a 52–38 victory. He finished the season with 53 receptions for 524 yards and four touchdowns while adding 68 rushing yards and one rushing touchdown. He also threw a touchdown pass and returned a kickoff for a touchdown. Following the season, he was named second-team All-AAC as both a wide receiver and return specialist.

In 2021, Snead appeared in all 12 games with 11 starts. In Week 2 against South Carolina, he threw a 75-yard touchdown pass on the game's opening offensive play. The following week against Marshall, he caught five passes for 80 yards and threw another touchdown pass in a 42–38 victory. Later in the season, he recorded 13 receptions for 113 yards in a win over Memphis before posting a season-high 137 receiving yards and two touchdowns on five receptions against Navy the following week. Snead finished the season with career highs of 67 receptions, 855 receiving yards, and four touchdown receptions. He earned second-team All-AAC honors for the second consecutive season.

== Professional career ==
Pre-draft measurables
Height	Weight	Arm length	Hand span	Wingspan	40-yard dash	10-yard split	20-yard split	20-yard shuttle	Three-cone drill	Vertical jump	Broad jump	Bench press
5 ft 6 3/4 in (1.70 m)	172 lb (78 kg)	28 3/8 in (0.72 m)	8 1/4 in (0.21 m)	5 ft 11 in (1.80 m)	4.64 s	1.60 s	2.70 s	4.10 s	6.69 s	32.0 in (0.81 m)	9 ft 6 in (2.90 m)	9 reps
All values from Pro Day

=== Pittsburgh Steelers ===
Snead signed with the Pittsburgh Steelers as an undrafted free agent on May 16, 2022. During the preseason, he appeared in all three games and recorded five receptions for 27 yards. His lone touchdown came on a one-yard reception from Mason Rudolph on fourth-and-goal with 1:56 remaining, the game-winning score in a 16–15 victory over the Jacksonville Jaguars in the Steelers' second preseason game. He was released on August 30, 2022.

=== Montreal Alouettes ===
Snead signed with the Montreal Alouettes of the Canadian Football League in 2023. He made his CFL debut in Week 4 against BC, recording four receptions for 61 yards in a loss. In his second career game, he caught three touchdown passes from Cody Fajardo while finishing with three receptions for 48 yards in a loss against Hamilton. In Week 9 against Ottawa, Snead recorded a season-high seven receptions for 98 yards and two touchdowns. During the 2023 season, he started all 15 games he played, recording 56 receptions for 788 yards and five touchdowns. In the East Final against Toronto, he caught three passes for 31 yards and a touchdown in a 38–17 victory. In the 110th Grey Cup, he recorded four receptions for 51 yards in the Alouettes' 29–24 victory over Winnipeg.

In the 2024 season opener against Winnipeg, Snead suffered a foot injury that caused him to miss the next 11 games. He finished the season with 24 receptions for 253 yards in seven games, including seven starts. In the East Final against Toronto, he recorded four receptions for 42 yards as the Alouettes were eliminated.

In Week 2 of the 2025 season against Ottawa, Snead recorded the first 100-yard receiving game of his professional career and the first of his five 100-yard receiving performances on the season, finishing with four receptions for a season-high 117 yards in a victory. He started 17 regular-season games, recording 84 receptions for 1,129 yards—fifth in the CFL—and four touchdowns. Following the season, Snead was named to the 2025 Eastern All-CFL team and the 2025 All-CFL team. In the East Final against Hamilton, Snead caught three passes for 57 yards and the game's only touchdown for Montreal in a 19–16 victory. In the 112th Grey Cup, he recorded three receptions for 78 yards in a 25–17 loss to Saskatchewan.

In Week 11 of the 2026 season, Snead surpassed 1,000 receiving yards for the second consecutive season, recording six receptions for 107 yards and three touchdowns in a 44–28 loss to Winnipeg.

== Career statistics ==
=== CFL ===
Legend
	Won the Grey Cup
	Led the league
**Bold**	Career high

=== Regular season ===
Year	Team	Games		Receiving				Rushing			
Year	Team	GP	GS	Rec	Yds	Avg	TD	Att	Yds	Avg	TD
2023	MTL	15	15	56	788	14.1	5	0	0	0.0	0
2024	MTL	7	7	24	253	10.5	0	**2**	8	4.0	0
2025	MTL	17	17	84	1,129	13.4	4	1	11	11.0	0
2026	MTL	16	16	**95**	**1,474**	**15.5**	**13**	**2**	**23**	**11.5**	**1**
Career		55	55	259	3,644	14.1	22	5	42	8.4	1

=== Postseason ===
Year	Team	Games		Receiving				Rushing			
Year	Team	GP	GS	Rec	Yds	Avg	TD	Att	Yds	Avg	TD
2023	MTL	3	3	9	132	14.7	1	0	0	0.0	0
2024	MTL	1	1	4	42	10.5	0	0	0	0.0	0
2025	MTL	3	3	7	150	21.4	1	0	0	0.0	0
CFL career		7	7	20	324	16.2	2	0	0	0.0	0

=== College ===
Year	Team	Games		Receiving				Rushing				Kick returns				Punt returns			
Year	Team	GP	GS	Rec	Yds	Avg	TD	Att	Yds	Avg	TD	Ret	Yds	Avg	TD	Ret	Yds	Avg	TD
2018	East Carolina	4	3	15	236	15.7	4	0	0	0.0	0	0	0	0.0	0	0	0	0.0	0
2019	East Carolina	12	7	66	759	11.5	5	4	27	6.8	0	25	481	19.2	1	13	35	2.7	0
2020	East Carolina	9	9	53	524	9.9	5	3	68	22.7	1	18	409	22.7	1	12	144	12.0	0
2021	East Carolina	12	11	67	855	12.8	4	5	–1	–0.2	0	17	378	22.2	0	12	81	6.8	0
Career		37	30	201	2,374	11.8	18	12	94	7.8	1	60	1,268	21.1	2	37	260	7.0	0
