= 1993 All-Independent Football Alliance football team =

American college football season

The 1993 All-Independent football Alliance Team consists of American football players chosen by the Associated Press for their All-IFA teams for the 1993 NCAA Division I-A football season.

== Offense ==
=== Quarterback ===
- Gus Frerotte, Tulsa (AP-1)

=== Running backs ===
- David Small, Cincinnati (AP-1)
- Junior Smith, East Carolina (AP-1)

=== Wide receivers ===
- Chris Penn, Tulsa (AP-1)
- Isaac Bruce, Memphis (AP-1)

=== Tight ends ===
- Carlester Crumpler, East Carolina (AP-1)

=== Offensive linemen ===
- Todd Beeching, Southern Miss (AP-1)
- Ray Woodside, Cincinnati (AP-1)
- Mark Laskey, Tulsa (AP-1)
- Steve Williams, Memphis (AP-1)

=== Centers ===
- David Milwee, Southern Miss (AP-1)

== Defense ==
=== Defensive linemen ===
- Bernard Carter, East Carolina (AP-1)
- Michael Tobias, Southern Miss (AP-1)
- Rob Brown, Memphis (AP-1)
- Bobby Hamilton, Southern Miss (AP-1)

=== Linebackers ===
- Billy Cole, Tulsa (AP-1)
- Danton Barto, Memphis (AP-1)
- Tyrone Nix, Southern Miss (AP-1)
- Jacob Coppess, Cincinnati (AP-1)

=== Defensive backs ===
- Garrick Jackson, Tulsa (AP-1)
- Perry Carter, Southern Miss (AP-1)
- Jocelyn Borgella, Cincinnati (AP-1)
- Dominic Calloway, Memphis (AP-1)

== Special teams ==
=== Kicker ===
- Joe Allison, Memphis (AP-1)

=== Punter ===
- Eric Estes, Southern Miss (AP-1)
