= Rod Coleman =

Rod Coleman may refer to:

- Rod Coleman (American football) (born 1976), American football defensive tackle
- Rod Coleman (motorcycle racer) (born 1926), Grand Prix motorcycle road racer from New Zealand
