= 2007 East Carolina Pirates football team =

American college football season

2007 East Carolina Pirates football

Hawaii Bowl champion

Hawaii Bowl, W 41–38 vs. Boise State
- Conference: Conference USA
- East
- Record: 8–5 (6–2 C-USA)
- Head coach: Skip Holtz (3rd season)
- Co-offensive coordinators: Steve Shankweiler (3rd season); Todd Fitch (1st season)
- Offensive scheme: Multiple
- Defensive coordinator: Greg Hudson (3rd season)
- Base defense: 4–3
- Home stadium: Dowdy–Ficklen Stadium

2007 Conference USA football standings
	Conf.			Overall
Team	W		L	W		L
East Division
UCF x$	7	–	1	10	–	4
East Carolina	6	–	2	8	–	5
Memphis	6	–	2	7	–	6
Southern Miss	5	–	3	7	–	6
Marshall	3	–	5	3	–	9
UAB	1	–	7	2	–	10
West Division
Tulsa xy	6	–	2	10	–	4
Houston x	6	–	2	8	–	5
Tulane	3	–	5	4	–	8
Rice	3	–	5	3	–	9
UTEP	2	–	6	4	–	8
SMU	0	–	8	1	–	11
Championship: UCF 44, Tulsa 25
$ – Conference champion; x – Division champion/co-champions; y – Championship game participant; Rankings from AP Poll

The 2007 East Carolina Pirates football team represented East Carolina University in the 2007 NCAA Division I FBS football season and played their home games in Dowdy–Ficklen Stadium. The team was coached by Skip Holtz, who was in his fourth year with the program.

The Pirates have a local television contract with WITN-TV, an NBC affiliate located in Washington, NC who elects to pick up games that are not picked up by national or regional networks, and all games are broadcast over the radio on the Pirate-ISP Sports Network. The flagship radio stations of the Pirates are Pirate Radio 1250 and 930 AM and Oldies 107.9 WNCT, both located in Greenville, NC. The games are called by the "Voice of the Pirates," Jeff Charles.

== Preseason ==
=== Recruiting ===
College recruiting information (2007)
Name	Hometown	School	Height	Weight	40^{‡}	Commit date
Michael Byrd; TE	Thomasville, North Carolina	Thomasville HS	6 ft 4 in (1.93 m)	225 lb (102 kg)	–	Oct 8, 2006
Michael Byrd; TE	Recruit ratings: Scout: Rivals: (40)					
Julian Carter; S	New Bern, North Carolina	New Bern HS	6 ft 2 in (1.88 m)	180 lb (82 kg)	4.75	Oct 19, 2006
Julian Carter; S	Recruit ratings: Scout: Rivals: (40)					
Rodney Cox; WR	Angier, North Carolina	Harnett Central HS	6 ft 6 in (1.98 m)	210 lb (95 kg)	–	Dec 19, 2006
Rodney Cox; WR	Recruit ratings: Scout: Rivals: (77)					
Emanuel Davis; S	Manteo, North Carolina	Manteo HS	5 ft 11 in (1.80 m)	188 lb (85 kg)	4.5	Jan 19, 2007
Emanuel Davis; S	Recruit ratings: Scout: Rivals: (77)					
Darryl Freeney; WR	Suffolk, Virginia	Nansemond River HS	5 ft 10 in (1.78 m)	170 lb (77 kg)	–	Aug 10, 2006
Darryl Freeney; WR	Recruit ratings: Scout: Rivals: (40)					
Austin Haynes; WLB	Jacksonville, North Carolina	Southwest HS	6 ft 2 in (1.88 m)	207 lb (94 kg)	4.7	Jun 26, 2006
Austin Haynes; WLB	Recruit ratings: Scout: Rivals: (40)					
Ben Herlocker; FB	Charlotte, North Carolina	Charlotte Catholic HS	6 ft 0 in (1.83 m)	205 lb (93 kg)	–	Aug 1, 2006
Ben Herlocker; FB	Recruit ratings: Scout: Rivals: (75)					
Antwan Jones; DE	King, North Carolina	West Stokes HS	6 ft 4 in (1.93 m)	250 lb (110 kg)	4.93	Jan 24, 2007
Antwan Jones; DE	Recruit ratings: Scout: Rivals: (40)					
DeAndre Jones; CB	Vanceboro, North Carolina	West Craven HS	6 ft 0 in (1.83 m)	180 lb (82 kg)	4.45	Oct 26, 2006
DeAndre Jones; CB	Recruit ratings: Scout: Rivals: (40)					
Linval Joseph; OT	Alachua, Florida	Santa Fe HS	6 ft 6 in (1.98 m)	310 lb (140 kg)	5.10	Jan 18, 2007
Linval Joseph; OT	Recruit ratings: Scout: Rivals: (40)					
Travis Lee; WR	Bakersfield, California	Bakersfield	5 ft 11 in (1.80 m)	195 lb (88 kg)	–	Feb 7, 2007
Travis Lee; WR	Recruit ratings: Scout: Rivals:					
D.J. McFadden; QB	Charlotte, North Carolina	Independence HS	6 ft 2 in (1.88 m)	215 lb (98 kg)	–	Jul 11, 2006
D.J. McFadden; QB	Recruit ratings: Scout: Rivals: (71)					
Daronte McNeil; RB	Elizabeth City, North Carolina	Northeastern HS	6 ft 1 in (1.85 m)	233 lb (106 kg)	4.75	Aug 9, 2006
Daronte McNeil; RB	Recruit ratings: Scout: Rivals: (77)					
Maurice Mercer; TE	Nashville, North Carolina	Nash Central Junior HS	6 ft 4 in (1.93 m)	230 lb (100 kg)	–	Oct 8, 2006
Maurice Mercer; TE	Recruit ratings: Scout: Rivals: (40)					
Cliff Perryman; WLB	Richmond, Virginia	Hermitage HS	6 ft 1 in (1.85 m)	205 lb (93 kg)	–	Jul 31, 2006
Cliff Perryman; WLB	Recruit ratings: Scout: Rivals: (40)					
J.R. Rogers; RB	Bakersfield, California	Bakersfield	5 ft 11 in (1.80 m)	190 lb (86 kg)	–	Feb 7, 2007
J.R. Rogers; RB	Recruit ratings: Scout: Rivals:					
Steve Spence; MLB	Norfolk, Virginia	Maury HS	6 ft 2 in (1.88 m)	220 lb (100 kg)	–	Jun 21, 2006
Steve Spence; MLB	Recruit ratings: Scout: Rivals: (40)					
Matt Thompson; S	Mebane, North Carolina	Eastern Alamance HS	6 ft 2 in (1.88 m)	190 lb (86 kg)	4.60	Oct 3, 2006
Matt Thompson; S	Recruit ratings: Scout: Rivals: (40)					
Will Towery; TE	Asheville, North Carolina	A C Reynolds HS	6 ft 5 in (1.96 m)	255 lb (116 kg)	–	Feb 6, 2007
Will Towery; TE	Recruit ratings: Scout: Rivals: (40)					
Devon Wallace; S	Graham, NC	Southern Alamance HS	6 ft 2 in (1.88 m)	190 lb (86 kg)	–	Jul 28, 2006
Devon Wallace; S	Recruit ratings: Scout: Rivals: (76)					
Jonathan Williams; S	Greenville, North Carolina	Junius H Rose HS	6 ft 1 in (1.85 m)	190 lb (86 kg)	4.50	Jan 7, 2007
Jonathan Williams; S	Recruit ratings: Scout: Rivals: (40)					
Tyrell Worthington; RB	Winterville, NC	South Central HS	6 ft 0 in (1.83 m)	185 lb (84 kg)	4.47	Dec 1, 2006
Tyrell Worthington; RB	Recruit ratings: Scout: Rivals: (67)					
Overall recruit ranking: Scout: 72 Rivals: 81
‡ Refers to 40-yard dash; Note: In many cases, Scout, Rivals, 247Sports, On3, and ESPN may conflict in their listings of height, weight and 40 time.; In these cases, the average was taken. ESPN grades are on a 100-point scale.; Sources: "East Carolina 2007 Football Commitments". Rivals.; "Football Recruiting Commits". Scout.; "2007 Player commits". ESPN.; "Scout.com Team Recruiting Rankings". Scout.; "2007 Team Ranking". Rivals.com.

== Schedule ==
Date	Time	Opponent	Site	TV	Result	Attendance
September 1	12:00pm	at No. 9 Virginia Tech*	Lane Stadium; Blacksburg, VA (College GameDay)	ESPN	L 7–17	66,233
September 8	6:00pm	North Carolina*	Dowdy–Ficklen Stadium; Greenville, NC	CSTV	W 34–31	43,387
September 15	6:00pm	Southern Miss	Dowdy–Ficklen Stadium; Greenville, NC	MASN	L 21–28	43,041
September 22	12:00pm	at No. 5 West Virginia*	Mountaineer Field; Morgantown, WV	ESPN2	L 7–48	60,021
September 29	7:00pm	at Houston	Robertson Stadium; Houston, TX	MASN	W 37–35	20,719
October 6	7:30pm	UCF	Dowdy–Ficklen Stadium; Greenville, NC	CSTV	W 52–38	42,777
October 13	9:05pm	at UTEP	Sun Bowl Stadium; El Paso, TX	MASN	W 45–42 ^{OT}	41,365
October 20	4:30pm	NC State*	Dowdy–Ficklen Stadium; Greenville, NC (Victory Barrel)	CSTV	L 20–34	43,527
October 27	3:30pm	UAB^{†}	Dowdy–Ficklen Stadium; Greenville, NC	MASN	W 41–6	41,125
November 3	2:00pm	at Memphis	Liberty Bowl; Memphis, TN	MASN	W 56–40	27,186
November 10	4:30pm	at Marshall	Joan C. Edwards Stadium; Huntington, WV	MASN	L 7–26	26,718
November 24	1:00pm	Tulane	Dowdy–Ficklen Stadium; Greenville, NC	MASN	W 35–12	35,362
December 23	8:00pm	vs. No. 24 Boise State*	Aloha Stadium; Honolulu, HI (Hawaii Bowl)	ESPN	W 41–38	30,467
*Non-conference game; ^{†}Homecoming; Rankings from AP Poll released prior to the game; All times are in Eastern time

== Roster ==
2007 East Carolina Pirates
Quarterbacks: 4 Taylor Mazzone – Sophomore; 11 Brett Clay – Sophomore; 12 D.J. McFadden – Freshman; 13 Joe Sloan – Sophomore; 14 Rob Kass – Sophomore; 15 Patrick Pinkney† – Junior; Running backs: 1 Darnell Ballard – Sophomore; 2 Jonathan Williams – Freshman; 5 Chris Johnson† – Senior; 6 J.R. Rogers – Junior; 24 Dominique Lindsay† – Junior; 25 Brandon Simmons – Junior; 33 Justin Brockmeyer – Sopohomre; 33 Norman Whitley – (redshirt) Freshman; -- Derrick Jones – Junior; Fullbacks: 39 Ben Herlocker – Freshman; 43 Jason Simmons – Junior; 91 Jay Sonnhalter – Senior; -- David Ward – Junior; Wide receivers: 7 T.J. Lee – Junior; 10 Jamar Bryant† – Sophomore; 17 Dwayne Harris† – (redshirt) Freshman; 22 Michael Bowman – Freshman; 28 Michael Hickman – Senior; 32 Philip Henry – Senior; 80 Alex Taylor – Sophomore; 81 Darryl Freeney – Freshman; 82 Juwon Crowell – Senior; 83 Steven Rogers† – Senior; 84 Javon Brumsey – Freshman; 85 DeMorio Waymon – Freshman; 88 Kyle Johnson – Sophomore; -- Jeremy Bullard – Junior; -- Anthony Green – (redshirt) Freshman	Tight ends: 3 Davon Drew† – Junior; 85 Martin Tanski – Sophomore; 86 Michael Byrd – Freshman; 87 J.R. Kraemer – Junior; 89 Will Towery – Freshman; Offensive line: 54 Sean Allen – Sophomore; 57 Fred Hicks – Junior; 60 Andrew Farr – (redshirt) Freshman; 62 Larry Lease – (redshirt) Freshman; 63 Doug Polochak – (redshirt) Freshman; 64 Travis Melvin – (redshirt) Freshman; 65 Travis Bastin – (redshirt) Freshman; 66 D.J. Scott – (redshirt) Freshman; 68 Matt Butler† – Senior; 69 Willie Barton – Junior; 70 Doug Palmer† – Sophomore; 72 Stephen Heis† – Sophomore; 75 Cory Dowless – Sophomore; 76 Josh Coffman† – Senior; 78 Stanley Bryant† – Junior; 79 Brandon Setzer – Junior; Defensive line: 41 Zack Slate† – Junior; 53 Scotty Robinson – Sophomore; 56 Chris Atkins – (redshirt) Freshman; 89 Craig Harper – Senior; 90 Jay Ross† – Sophomore; 92 Marcus Hands – Junior; 93 Kwaku Danso – Sophomore; 93 Maurice Mercer – Freshman; 94 Willie Smith – (redshirt) Freshman; 95 C.J. Wilson† – Sophomore; 96 Mark Robinson – Senior; 97 Linval Joseph† – Freshman; 98 Khalif Mitchell – Junior; 99 Antonio Allison – Freshman; 99 Nweike Osemene – Senior	Linebackers: 31 Lorenzo Osborne – Sophomore; 34 Pierre Bell† – Junior; 40 Cliff Perryman – Freshman; 42 Danny Muhwezi – Senior; 44 Nick Johnson – Sophomore; 46 A.J. Johnson – (redshirt) Freshman; 47 Orlando Farrow – Senior; 48 Durwin Lamb – Senior; 49 Jeremy Chambliss – Sophomore; 50 Quentin Cotton† – Junior; 51 Fred Wilson† – Senior; 55 Dalvon Mack – Junior; 55 Steve Spence – Freshman; 56 Juan Quintanilla – Junior; 58 Austin Haynes – Freshman; Defensive backs: 22 Kris Bell – Sophomore; 24 Jeremy Bullock – Sophomore; 26 Derek Blacknall – Freshman; 27 Spencer Hampton – (redshirt) Freshman; 27 Devon Wallace – Freshman; 28 Matt Thompson – Freshman; 37 Julian Carter – Freshman; 38 Emanuel Davis – Freshman; 40 Kurtis von Bargen – Junior; Cornerback: 8 Travis Williams† – Senior; 35 Jerek Hewett† – Junior; 13 Travis Simmons – Freshman; 21 Darryl Reynolds – Freshman; 23 Dekota Marshall – (redshirt) Freshman	Safeties: 1 Leon Best – Junior; 4 Van Eskridge† – Sophomore; 9 Melvin Patterson – Senior; 20 J.J. Milbrook† – Junior; 19 Chris Mattocks – Sophomore; Punters: 5 Nathan Przestrzelski – (redshirt) Freshman; 14 Matt Dodge† – Sophomore; Kickers: 30 Ben Hartman† – Sophomore; Long snappers: 59 Wilson Raynor† – Junior; 52 Corey Bass – Junior
† Starter at position

== Coaching staff ==
Position	Name	Years at ECU	Alma Mater
Head Coach:	Skip Holtz	3rd	Notre Dame '86
Offensive coordinator/ Quarterbacks Coach:	Todd Fitch	1st	Ohio Wesleyan '86
Defensive coordinator Linebacker Coach:	Greg Hudson	2nd	Notre Dame '90
Offensive coordinator Offensive linemen coach:	Steve Shankweiler	3rd(13th overall)	Davidson '74
Assistant head coach/ Secondarys Coach	Rick Smith	3rd	Florida State '71
Director of strength & conditioning	Michael Golden	2nd	Central Connecticut State '92
Defensive end Coach/ Special teams	Vernon Hargreaves	1st	Connecticut '86
Wide receiver Coach/ Recruiting coordinator	Donnie Kirkpatrick	3rd	Lenoir-Rhyne '82
Tight ends Coach:	Phil Petty	3rd	South Carolina '01
Director of HS football relations	Harold Robinson	3rd	East Carolina '72
Defensive tackle Coach	Thomas Roggeman	3rd	Notre Dame '85
Running backs Coach	Wardell "Junior" Smith	3rd	East Carolina '97
Director of operations	Clifford Snow	2nd	Central Connecticut State '83
Staff Assistant/ Defense Coach	Tim Carter	2nd	Tulane '01
Staff Assistant/ Offense Coach	Paul Troth	2nd	Liberty '05
Administrative Assistant to Coach Holtz	Courtney Bishop	-	-
Administrative Assistant	Ann Coyle	-	East Carolina '06
Administrative Assistant	Ryan Ormond	-	North Carolina '02

== Game summaries ==
=== Virginia Tech ===
	1	2	3	4	Total
East Carolina	0	7	0	0	7
#9 Virginia Tech	3	7	0	7	17

Recap: Week 1

The Pirates traveled to Blacksburg for an emotional game that marked the first football game since thirty-two students lost their lives in a shooting on the Virginia Tech campus. Prior to the game, the Hokies led the all-time series 8–4–1. The Pirates entered the game without starting quarterback Rob Kass and struggled offensively. After a costly interception returned for a touchdown by Macho Harris followed by a Sean Glennon touchdown pass, the Pirates were defeated by Virginia Tech, 17–7.

=== North Carolina ===
	1	2	3	4	Total
North Carolina	10	7	14	0	31
East Carolina	7	10	14	3	34

Recap: Week 2

The Pirates welcomed the Tar Heels to Greenville for only the second time in this series' history. North Carolina went into the game leading the all-time record 8–1–1 after a 28–17 victory in Greenville in 2003, but they would be unable to repeat. Quarterback Patrick Pinkney led the Pirates offensively and completed 31 of 41 passes for 406 yards, but North Carolina's T. J. Yates would answer by throwing three touchdowns and keeping the game close. A costly mistake by the Tar Heels set up the final drive, where after missing all prior field goals in the game, Placekicker Ben Hartman made the game-winning field goal, leading the Pirates to defeat the Tar Heels in Greenville for the first time ever, 34–31.

=== Southern Miss ===
	1	2	3	4	Total
Southern Miss	0	14	0	14	28
East Carolina	0	0	21	0	21

=== West Virginia ===
	1	2	3	4	Total
East Carolina	0	0	0	7	7
#5 West Virginia	10	17	14	7	48

=== Houston ===
	1	2	3	4	Total
East Carolina	0	20	17	0	37
Houston	7	14	14	0	35

=== UCF ===
	1	2	3	4	Total
UCF	14	14	3	7	38
East Carolina	7	10	28	7	52

=== UTEP ===
	1	2	3	4	OT	Total
East Carolina	10	8	14	7	6	45
UTEP	7	12	6	14	3	42

=== NC State ===
	1	2	3	4	Total
NC State	14	7	0	13	34
East Carolina	0	17	3	0	20

=== UAB ===
	1	2	3	4	Total
UAB	3	3	0	0	6
East Carolina	10	10	21	0	41

=== Memphis ===
	1	2	3	4	Total
East Carolina	14	7	28	7	56
Memphis	3	10	13	14	40

=== Marshall ===
	1	2	3	4	Total
East Carolina	0	0	7	0	7
Marshall	3	7	6	10	26

=== Tulane ===
	1	2	3	4	Total
Tulane	0	6	6	0	12
East Carolina	7	14	0	14	35

=== Hawaii Bowl ===
	1	2	3	4	Total
#22 Boise State	7	7	10	14	38
East Carolina	10	21	7	3	41

== Postseason ==
=== NFL draft picks ===
- Chris Johnson – Round 1: 24th (24th overall) – Tennessee Titans

=== Awards ===
- Conference USA Special Teams Player of the Year: Chris Johnson

=== Honors ===
1st Team All America
- Chris Johnson – Sr. KR

1st Team All C-USA
- Chris Johnson – Sr. KR

2nd Team All C-USA
- Chris Johnson – Sr. RB
- Josh Coffman – Sr. OL
- Zack Slate – Jr. DL
- C.J. Wilson – Jr. DL
- Van Eskridge – So. DB
- Matt Butler – Sr. OL

C-USA All Freshman Team
- D.J. Scott – OL
- Linval Joseph – DL
- Travis Simmons – DB
- Jonathan Williams – KR
- Dwayne Harris – PR

C-USA All Academic Team
- Josh Coffman Sr. RT (3.50)

== Statistics ==
=== Team ===
	Team	Opp
Scoring	403	395
Points per game	31	30.4
First downs	246	300
Rushing	117	105
Passing	108	175
Penalty	21	20
Total offense	5011	5605
Avg per play	5.7	5.7
Avg per game	385.5	431.2
Fumbles-Lost	15–5	28–14
Penalties-Yards	104–827	71–699
Avg per game	63.6	53.8

	Team	Opp
Punts-Yards	82-3307	61-2256
Avg per punt	40.3	37.0
Time of possession/Game	28:56	31:04
3rd down conversions	71/182	81/201
4th down conversions	4/12	11/19
Touchdowns scored	52	48
Field goals-Attempts-Long	13–23	21–27
PAT-Attempts	50–50	40–45
Attendance	249219	242242
Games/Avg per Game	6/41536	6/40374
Neutral Site Avg	1/41536	

==== Scores by quarter ====
	1	2	3	4	OT	Total
East Carolina	65	124	160	48	6	403
Opponents	87	119	80	106	3	395

=== Offense ===
==== Rushing ====
Name	GP	Att	Gain	Loss	Net	Avg	Td	Long	Avg/g
Johnson, Chris	13	236	1468	45	1423	6.0	17	70	109.5
Pinkney, Patrick	13	79	402	96	306	3.9	1	45	23.5
Lindsay, Dominique	13	66	225	20	205	3.1	5	22	15.8
Harris, Dwayne	13	20	197	0	197	9.9	1	57	15.2
Williams, Jonathan	10	22	153	3	150	6.8	1	35	15.0
Whitley, Norman	8	6	44	0	44	7.3	0	14	5.5
Simmons, Brandon	11	11	32	4	28	2.5	2	9	2.5
Dodge, Matt	13	3	20	0	20	6.7	0	9	1.5
Kass, Rob	10	33	101	82	19	0.6	2	15	1.9
Brockmeyer, Justin	1	1	1	0	1	1.0	0	1	1.0
Ballard, Darnell	1	1	0	0	0	0.0	0	0	0.0
Clay, Brett	4	3	3	14	−11	−3.7	0	3	−2.8
Team	8	3	0	4	−4	−1.3	0	0	−0.5
Total	13	484	2646	268	2378	4.9	29	70	182.9

==== Passing ====
Name	GP	Effic	Att-cmp-int	Pct	Yds	Td	Lng	Avg/g
Pinkney, Patrick	13	131.69	121–200–4	60.5	1358	11	78	104.5
Kass, Rob	10	123.13	96–175–4	54.9	1164	9	72	116.4
Clay, Brett	4	39.88	5–13–1	38.5	26	0	14	6.5
Harris, Dwayne	13	367.33	1–3–0	33.3	80	1	80	6.2
Sloan, Joseph	13	142.00	1–1–0	100.0	5	0	5	0.4
Team	8	0.00	0–3–0	0.0	0	0	0	0.0
Total	13	125.69	224–395–9	56.7	2633	21	80	202.5

==== Receiving ====
Name	GP	No.	Yds	Avg	TD	Long	Avg/G
Bryant, Jamar	13	48	704	14.7	6	80	54.2
Johnson, Chris	13	37	528	14.3	6	78	40.6
Henry, Phillip	13	27	279	10.3	0	20	21.5
Harris, Dwayne	13	26	246	9.5	2	22	18.9
Rogers, Steven	13	25	252	10.1	2	39	19.4
Drew, Davon	13	19	196	10.3	2	26	15.1
Crowell, Juwon	13	11	144	13.1	1	34	11.1
Lindsay, Dominique	13	9	58	6.4	1	11	4.5
Sonnhalter, Jay	13	7	54	7.7	0	16	4.2
Lee, T.J.	12	5	83	16.6	1	34	6.9
Hickman, Michael	12	4	79	19.8	0	31	6.6
Johnson, Kyle	10	2	5	2.5	0	6	0.5
Kraemer, J.R.	9	1	9	9.0	0	9	1.0
Brumsey, Javon	2	1	5	5.0	0	5	2.5
Williams, Jonathan	10	1	4	4.0	0	4	0.4
Pinkney, Patrick	13	1	−13	−13.0	0	0	−1.0
Total	13	224	2633	11.8	21	80	202.5

=== Defense ===
Name	GP	Tackles				Sacks	Pass defense			Fumbles		Blkd Kick	Safety
Name	GP	Solo	Ast	Total	TFL-Yds	No-Yds	Int-Yds	BrUp	QBH	Rcv-Yds	FF	Blkd Kick	Safety
Eskridge, Van	13	55	49	104	6.5–18	.	1–7	3	.	1–50	.	.	.
Bell, Pierre	13	45	52	97	5.0–9	.	2–13	2	3	.	1	.	.
Wilson, Fred	13	26	55	81	1.5–5	1.5–5	.	1	2	.	.	.	.
Williams, Travis	13	53	24	77	2.5–7	.	2–0	4	1	.	2	.	.
Cotton, Quentin	12	35	31	66	11.0–48	1.5–13	1–16	2	6	1–0	1	.	.
Hewett, Jerek	13	33	16	49	2.0–7	.	2–0	5	.	1–0	1	.	.
Slate, Zack	13	22	27	49	11.5–44	4.5–21	.	1	4	.	2	.	.
Milbrook, J.J.	12	26	21	47	4.0–16	.	3–37	.	.	.	2	.	.
Best, Leon	13	21	20	41	1.0–1	.	2–47	3	.	.	1	.	.
Joseph, Linval	13	13	27	40	8.5–23	1.0–7	.	.	5	2–0	.	.	.
Mattocks, Chris	10	24	15	39	1.0–1	.	.	1	.	.	1	.	.
Chambliss, Jeremy	11	20	18	38	3.0–9	.	1–17	1	.	1–4	1	.	.
Ross, Jay	13	13	25	38	4.5–21	2.0–12	.	4	7	2–0	1	.	.
Wilson, C.J.	13	17	19	36	10.5–59	7.0–49	.	.	12	.	1	2	.
Mack, Dalvon	11	11	17	28	0.5–6	0.5–6	.	1	.	.	2	.	.
Johnson, Nick	11	14	14	28	1.5–3	.	.	1	1	1–0	1	.	.
Simmons, Travis	12	17	10	27	.	.	1–80	2	.	.	.	.	.
Osborne, Lorenzo	13	9	13	22	2.0–21	2.0–21	.	.	2	.	.	.	.
Patterson, Melvin	13	5	15	20	2.0–10	.	.	.	.	.	.	.	.
Mitchell, Khalif	11	10	9	19	5.5–24	2.0–20	1–0	1	3	1–0	.	.	.
Robinson, Scott	13	3	13	16	3.5–14	1.5–6	.	.	3	.	.	.	.
Marshall, Dekota	13	9	6	15	1.0–9	.	.	.	.	1–0	.	.	.
Reynolds, Darryl	9	9	6	15	1.0–1	.	1–0	3	.	.	.	.	.
Hands, Marcus	4	2	12	14	2.0–10	0.5–4	.	.	4	1–0	.	.	.
Muhwezi, Danny	10	6	7	13	1.5–2	.	.	.	.	.	.	.	.
Robinson, Mark	13	3	5	8	2.0–6	2.0–6	.	.	.	.	.	.	.
Smith, Willie	11	2	5	7	1.0–1	.	.	.	1	.	1	.	.
Hartman, Ben	13	4	2	6	.	.	.	.	.	.	.	.	.
Quintanilla, Juan	7	3	3	6	.	.	.	.	.	.	1	.	.
Lamb, Durwin	11	2	4	6	.	.	.	.	1	.	.	.	.
Williams, Jonathan	10	4	1	5	.	.	.	.	.	1–0	.	.	.
Lindsay, Dominique	13	2	3	5	.	.	.	.	.	.	1	.	.
Raynor, Wilson	13	1	3	4	.	.	.	.	.	.	.	.	.
Setzer, Brandon	4	1	2	3	0.5–2	.	.	2	.	.	.	.	.
Simmons, Brandon	11	1	2	3	.	.	.	.	.	.	.	.	.
Johnson, A.J.	7	3	.	3	.	.	.	.	.	.	.	.	.
Bell, Kris	3	1	2	3	.	.	.	.	.	.	.	.	.
Drew, Davon	13	2	.	2	.	.	.	.	.	.	.	.	.
Hampton, Spencer	4	1	1	2	.	.	.	.	.	.	.	.	.
Lee, T.J.	12	2	.	2	.	.	.	.	.	.	.	.	.
Harris, Dwayne	13	1	1	2	.	.	.	.	.	.	.	.	.
Osemene, Nweike	11	1	1	2	1.5–6	1.0–5	.	.	.	1–0	.	.	.
Hickman, Michael	12	1	1	2	.	.	.	.	.	.	.	.	.
Sonnhalter, Jay	13	.	2	2	.	.	.	.	.	.	.	.	.
Atkins, Chris	2	2	.	2	.	.	.	.	.	.	.	.	.
Gidrey, Kevin	13	.	1	1	.	.	.	.	.	.	.	.	.
Crowell, Juwon	13	1	.	1	.	.	.	.	.	.	.	1	.
Rogers, Steven	13	1	.	1	.	.	.	.	.	.	.	.	.
Pittman, Wesley	2	.	1	1	.	.	.	.	.	.	.	.	.
Harper, Craig	2	1	.	1	.	.	.	.	.	.	.	.	.
Bryant, Jamar	13	1	.	1	.	.	.	.	.	.	.	.	.
Kraemer, J.R.	9	.	1	1	.	.	.	.	.	.	.	.	.
Johnson, Kyle	10	1	.	1	.	.	.	.	.	.	.	.	.
Pinkney, Patrick	13	1	.	1	.	.	.	.	.	.	.	.	.
Henry, Phillip	13	1	.	1	.	.	.	.	.	.	.	.	.
Total	13	542	562	1104	98–383	27–175	17–217	37	55	14–54	20	3	.

=== Special teams ===
Name	Punting								Kickoffs				
Name	No.	Yds	Avg	Long	TB	FC	I20	Blkd	No.	Yds	Avg	TB	OB
Dodge, Matt	80	3307	41.3	67	11	12	24	0	4	242	60.5	0	0
Hartman, Ben									69	4220	61.2	7	2
Team	2	0	0.0	0	0	0	0	2					
Total	82	3307	40.3	67	11	12	24	2	73	4462	61.1	7	2

Name	Punt returns					Kick returns				
Name	No.	Yds	Avg	TD	Long	No.	Yds	Avg	TD	Long
Harris, Dwayne	31	250	8.1	0	46	5	89	17.8	0	27
Rogers, Steven	3	8	2.7	0	8					
Johnson, Chris						36	1009	28.0	1	96
Williams, Jonathan						14	312	22.3	0	63
Lindsay, Dominique						2	58	29.0	0	33
Lamb, Durwin						1	10	10.0	0	10
Mack, Dalvon						1	5	5.0	0	5
Simmons, Jason						1	10	10.0	0	10
Kraemer, J.R.						1	6	6.0	0	6
Simmons, Brandon						1	7	7.0	0	7
Total	34	258	7.6	0	46	62	1506	24.3	1	96
