= David Blackwell (American football) =

American football player and coach (born 1971)

Current position
- Title: Defensive Tackles Coach
- Team: Missouri Tigers
- Conference: SEC

Biographical details
- Born: May 4, 1971 (age 55); Greenville, South Carolina, U.S.

Playing career
- 1990–1991: East Carolina
- Position: Offensive lineman

Coaching career (HC unless noted)
- 1992–1995: East Carolina (SA)
- 1996–1997: Illinois State (DL/RC)
- 1998–1999: Illinois State (LB/RC)
- 2000–2002: Pittsburgh (LB)
- 2003–2006: Clemson (LB/RC)
- 2007–2008: Clemson (ILB)
- 2009: South Florida (co-DC/LB)
- 2012–2013: Fordham (DC/LB)
- 2014–2017: Jacksonville State (co-DC/ILB)
- 2018: East Carolina (DC/LB)
- 2018: East Carolina (interim HC)
- 2019: Old Dominion (DC/ILB)
- 2020: Louisiana Tech (DC)
- 2021: Louisiana Tech (DC/LB)
- 2023: Missouri (SDA)
- 2024–present: Missouri (DT)

Head coaching record
- Overall: 0–1

David Blackwell (born May 4, 1971) is an American football coach who is currently the defensive tackles coach at the University of Missouri, a position he has held since 2023. He was previously the defensive coordinator at Old Dominion University and East Carolina University, serving as the interim head coach for the latter in 2018 after the termination of Scottie Montgomery and the defensive coordinator at Louisiana Tech University from 2020 to 2021.

== Coaching career ==
Blackwell started his coaching career at East Carolina as a student assistant after he suffered a neck-injury while playing offensive line for the Pirates. He also had coaching stints at Illinois State and Pittsburgh before joining the coaching staff at Clemson as the team's linebackers coach and later added recruiting coordinator duties a couple of months later after the departure of Rick Stockstill. He left after the 2008 season to join the coaching staff at South Florida as the Bulls linebackers coach and co-defensive coordinator. After being out of football for two seasons, Blackwell returned to college football as the defensive coordinator for Fordham from 2012 to 2013 before joining the Jacksonville State coaching staff in 2014 as a co-defensive coordinator and the inside linebackers coach.

=== East Carolina (second stint) ===
After finding success at Jacksonville State, Blackwell was hired to be the defensive coordinator at his alma mater East Carolina for the 2018 season. The ECU defense made dramatic improvements in almost every area finishing 3rd. nationally in TFLs and forced 3 and outs and top 20 nationally in sacks. He served as the interim head coach for the Pirates game against NC State after head coach Scottie Montgomery was fired on November 29, 2018.

=== Old Dominion ===
Blackwell was named the defensive coordinator at Old Dominion in 2019, In his lone season at Old Dominion, he guided the Monarchs to the top-50 defense in terms of yards allowed after ranking 118th the year before. Despite the drastic improvement of the defense, the Monarchs only won 1 game which led to Blackwell being terminated along with head coach Bobby Wilder.

=== Louisiana Tech ===
Blackwell was named the defensive coordinator at Louisiana Tech in January 2020.

=== Missouri ===
On March 23, 2023, Blackwell was named as a defensive consultant at Missouri.

On July 28, 2024, head coach Eliah Drinkwitz announced Blackwell will serve as Defensive Tackles Coach.

== Head coaching record ==
Year	Team	Overall	Conference	Standing	Bowl/playoffs
East Carolina Pirates (American Athletic Conference) (2018)
2018	East Carolina	0–1 (Note: Blackwell served as interim head coach after Scottie Montgomery was fired on November 29, 2018.)	0–0	6th (West)	
East Carolina:		0–1	0–0		
Total:		0–1			
