= Dominique Davis =

American gridiron football player (born 1989)

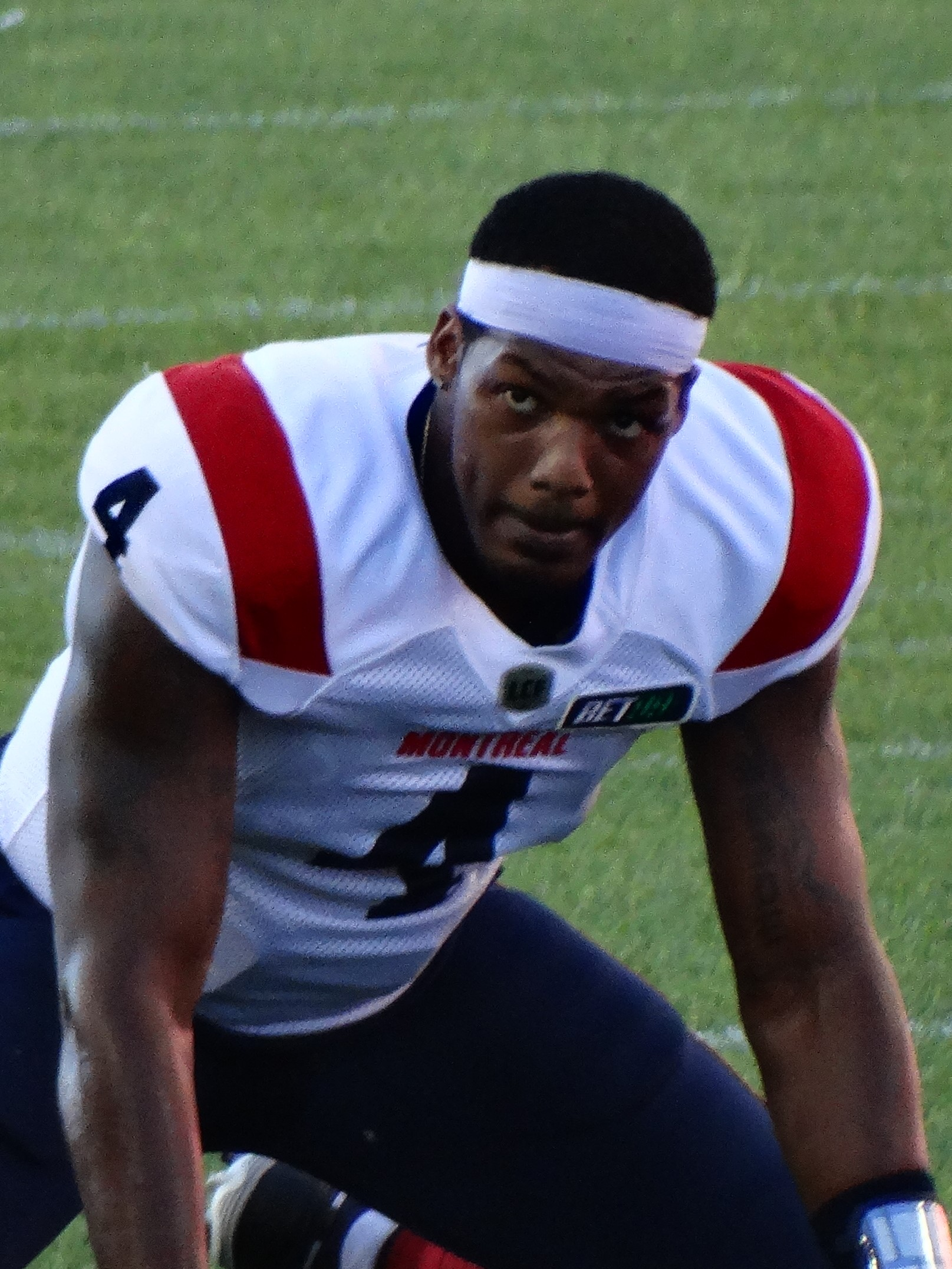
- Davis with the Montreal Alouettes in 2022

Profile
- Position: Quarterback

Personal information
- Born: July 17, 1989 (age 37); Lakeland, Florida, U.S.
- Listed height: 6 ft 3 in (1.91 m)
- Listed weight: 215 lb (98 kg)

Career information
- High school: Kathleen (Lakeland)
- College: Boston College (2007–2008); Fort Scott CC (2009); East Carolina (2010–2011)
- NFL draft: 2012: undrafted

Career history
- Atlanta Falcons (2012–2013); Tennessee Titans (2014)*; Indianapolis Colts (2014)*; Calgary Stampeders (2015)*; Winnipeg Blue Bombers (2015–2017); Ottawa Redblacks (2018–2021); Montreal Alouettes (2022); BC Lions (2023); Montreal Alouettes (2024)
- * Offseason or practice squad member only

Awards and highlights
- C–USA Newcomer of the Year (2010)

Career NFL statistics
- Passing attempts: 7
- Passing completions: 5
- Completion percentage: 71.4%
- TD–INT: 0–0
- Passing yards: 34
- Passer rating: 81.8
- Stats at Pro Football Reference

Career CFL statistics
- Passing completions: 344
- Passing attempts: 549
- Passing yards: 3,967
- TD–INT: 14–21
- Rushing touchdowns: 33
- Stats at CFL.ca

Dominique Dion Davis (born July 17, 1989) is an American professional football quarterback. He was signed by the Atlanta Falcons of the National Football League (NFL) as an undrafted free agent in 2012. Davis played college football at Boston College, Fort Scott Community College and East Carolina University.

== Early life ==
Davis earned FSWA All-State Class 3A first-team honors as a senior quarterback and was an honorable mention as a junior. He threw for 2,758 yards and 28 touchdowns in 2006. He completed 16-of-33 passes for 271 yards and one touchdown in the Kathleen High School's regional semifinal loss to Hardee. He completed 136-of-227 passes for 1,659 yards and 11 touchdowns as a junior, leading Kathleen to a 10–3 record and the district title. He also competed on the school's basketball and track and field teams.

== College career ==
=== Boston College ===
After sitting out the 2007 season with Matt Ryan leading the Boston College Eagles, in his second season he and Chris Crane vied for the position of quarterback early on in the 2008 season. Dominique got his first snaps in a game against University of Central Florida following a poor showing by Crane. He also played in the following game against University of Rhode Island, but then was benched by head coach Jeff Jagodzinski as Crane solidified his position.

Then in week 13 against Wake Forest Chris Crane went down in the second quarter and Dominique Davis came in with a 13–0 lead. Davis played mediocre, fumbling twice as the Boston College defense kept the game close until the final minutes of the game. Then with less than 4 minutes left Davis completed a long 3rd down to WR Rich Gunnell to put BC into scoring range. Following a pass to WR Brandon Robinson, Davis capped the drive with a short run for the winning score. His first victory as a starter came on November 28, 2008. The 28–21 victory over the Maryland Terrapins clinched BC's spot in the 2008 ACC Championship Game.

=== Fort Scott Community College ===
Davis was suspended for academic reasons in June 2009 and decided to transfer. On July 26 he announced his decision to transfer to Fort Scott Community College, where his plan was to play for one season before transferring back to a Division I program. He chose to transfer to East Carolina University and enrolled in May 2010.

Davis helped lead Fort Scott Community College to its first Jayhawk Conference championship since 1974, defeating Butler (Kansas) Community College in the final game of the regular season. Butler had won the previous eight Jayhawk Conference championships. It was the first time FSCC had beaten Butler since 1986.

Two weeks later, in a rematch, Davis' FSCC team defeated Butler, 13–12, to give the Greyhounds their first-ever Region VI Playoff championship. The Greyhounds were given the No. 1 ranking in the national poll and were matched up against No. 2 Blinn College (Texas) for the National Junior College Athletic Association national championship in the Citizens Bank Bowl on the campus of Pittsburg State University. Blinn rallied from a 26–10 deficit in the second half to win the game 31–26 on an 84-yard punt return with 15 seconds remaining. Fort Scott's 11–1 final record was still its best since going undefeated (11–0) to win the 1970 national championship.

=== East Carolina University ===
Davis transferred to East Carolina University for the 2010 season. In his first start with the Pirates, Davis completed 27 of 46 passes for 383 yards with 5 touchdowns and 1 interception. He also rushed for 29 yards with 1 TD. With five seconds remaining in regulation, Davis threw a 33-yard Hail Mary pass to Justin Jones in a 51–49 win over Tulsa.

Davis went on to pass for 3,967 yard and account for the third most touchdown passes (37) by a quarterback in the Football Bowl Subdivision and led the Pirates to a 6–7 record and a berth in the 2010 Military Bowl, losing 51–20.

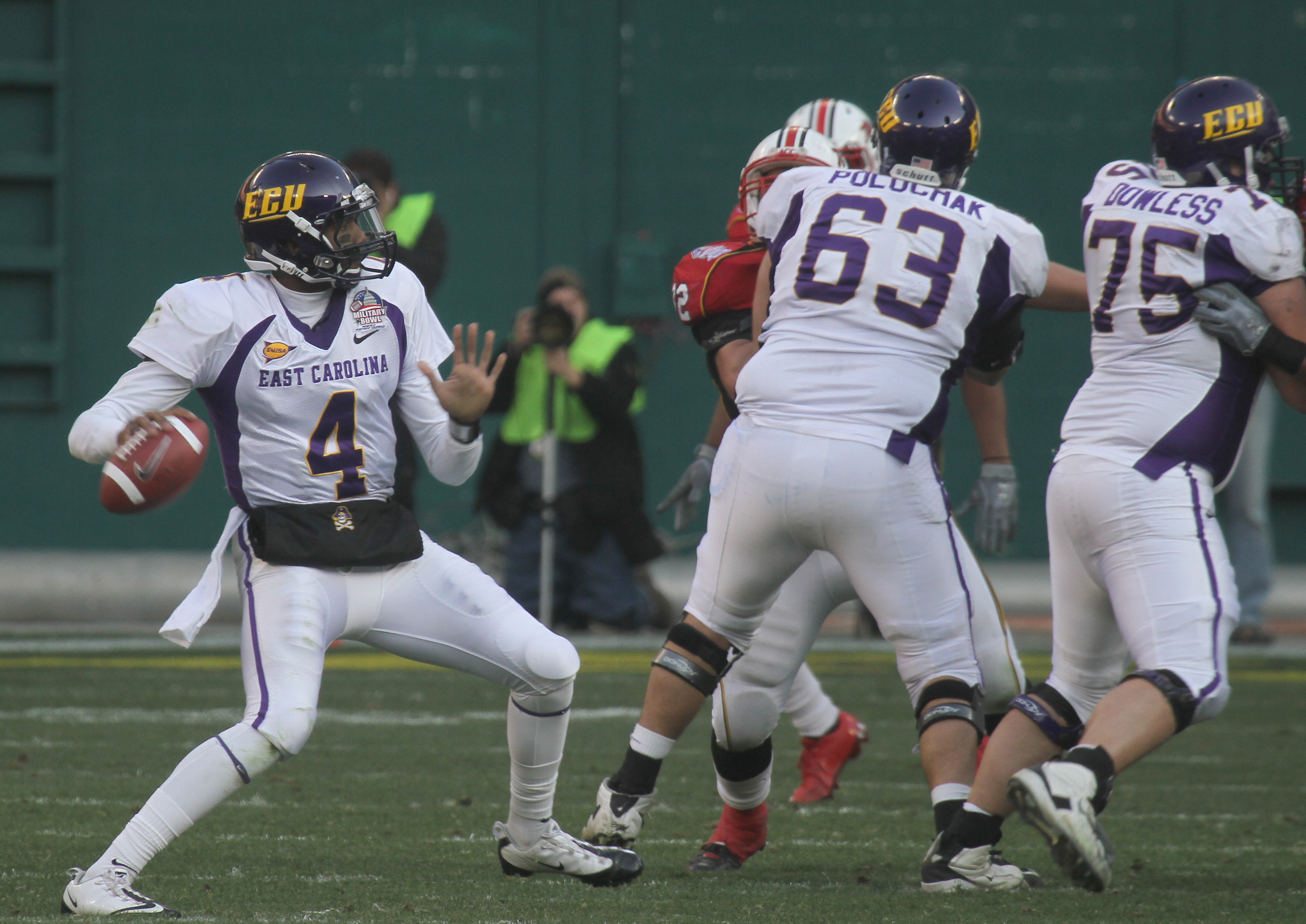
Davis (far left) at the 2010 Military Bowl

For the 2011 season Davis was named to the Manning Award, Maxwell Award, and Davey O'Brien Award watch lists. On October 22, 2011 the East Carolina quarterback did not throw an incomplete pass in the first half of the Pirates 38–35 victory over the Navy Midshipmen. This gave Davis the NCAA record for most consecutive completions in one game held by Tee Martin of Tennessee in 1998. Combining the 10 consecutive completions from the ECU's previous game against Memphis, his 36 consecutive passes over two games eclipsed the previous overall consecutive completion record of 26 held by Aaron Rodgers of Cal in 2004. This performance led Dominique to be selected by ESPN analysts as one of four finalists in the AT&T All-America Player of the Week for week 6 of the 2011 season.

Davis holds East Carolina's Single Season record for passing touchdowns with 37. He is fifth on the school's all-time passing yards list.

=== College statistics ===
Year	Team	Games			Passing								Rushing			
Year	Team	GP	GS	Record	Cmp	Att	Pct	Yds	Avg	TD	Int	Rtg	Att	Yds	Avg	TD
2007	Boston College	0	0	—	(redshirt) Redshirted											
2008	Boston College	6	3	1–2	63	138	45.7	741	5.4	6	4	99.3	43	48	1.1	2
2009	Fort Scott CC	12	12	11–1	113	215	52.5	1,467	6.8	6	8	111.6	62	31	0.5	12
2010	East Carolina	13	13	6–7	393	609	64.5	3,967	6.5	37	16	134.0	79	141	1.8	9
2011	East Carolina	12	12	5–7	334	494	67.6	3,225	6.5	25	19	131.5	93	172	1.8	5
Career		43	40	23–17	903	1,456	62.0	9,400	6.4	74	47	126.6	277	392	1.4	28

== Professional career ==
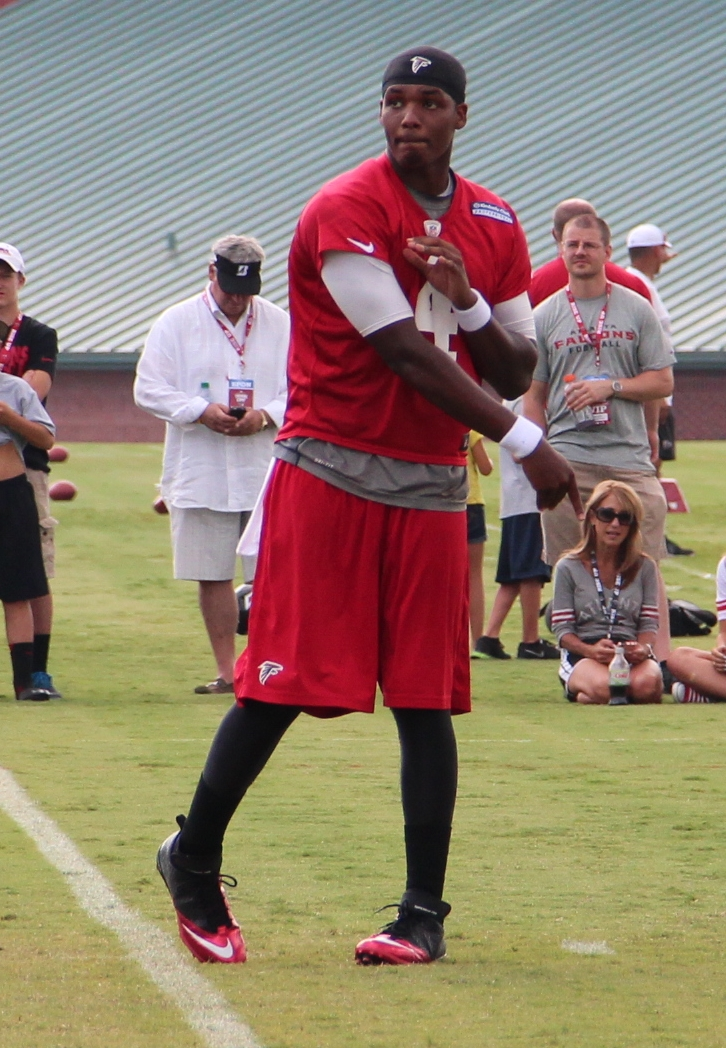
Davis in 2013 with the Atlanta Falcons

=== Atlanta Falcons ===
Davis signed a deal with the Atlanta Falcons after going undrafted and reunited with his former teammate, Matt Ryan. Davis was named the third-string quarterback position, behind Ryan and Luke McCown. Davis played in one game after a blowout loss to the Tampa bay Buccaneers he was 5–7 for 34 yards. He was waived on June 19, 2014.

=== Tennessee Titans ===
Davis signed with the Tennessee Titans on August 26, 2014. Davis played in one preseason game vs the Minnesota Vikings. He played very poorly going 2–5 and throwing an interception. He was released three days later.

=== Indianapolis Colts ===
Davis signed with the Indianapolis Colts on September 9, 2014. He was released on October 21, 2014.

=== Calgary Stampeders ===
Davis signed a contract with the Calgary Stampeders (CFL) on February 24, 2015. On June 20, Davis was released during the 2015 Calgary Stampeders training camp.

=== Winnipeg Blue Bombers ===
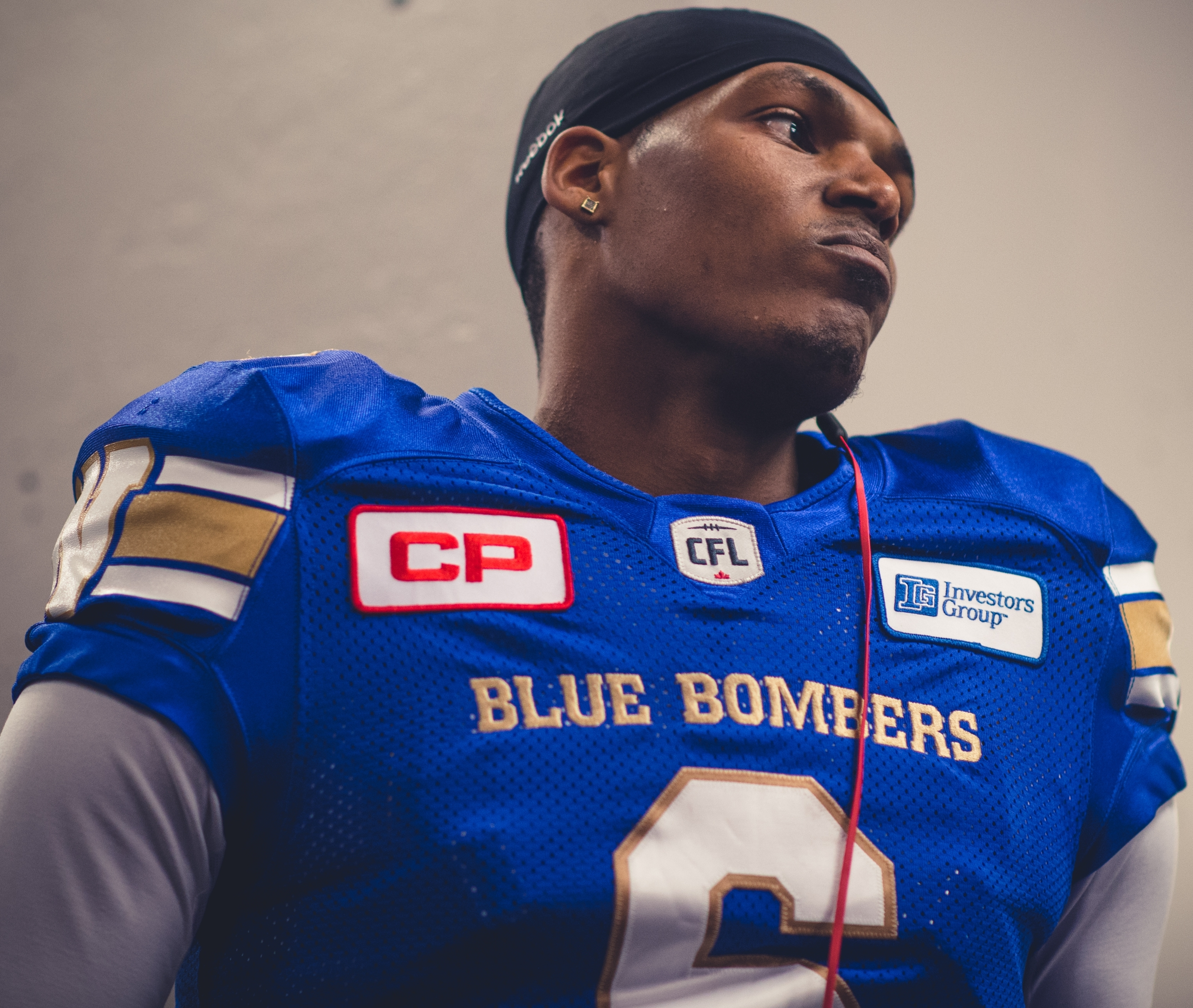
Davis with the Winnipeg Blue Bombers in 2016

Davis signed a contract with the Winnipeg Blue Bombers on June 29, 2015. In his first two seasons in Winnipeg he played in only one game, completing 16 of 25 pass attempts for 169 yards. On January 4, 2017, Davis was signed to a contract extension by the Blue Bombers. Davis played in three games in 2017, completing 17 of 29 pass attempts for 208 yards. On February 1, 2018 the Bombers announced they had released Davis.

=== Ottawa Redblacks ===
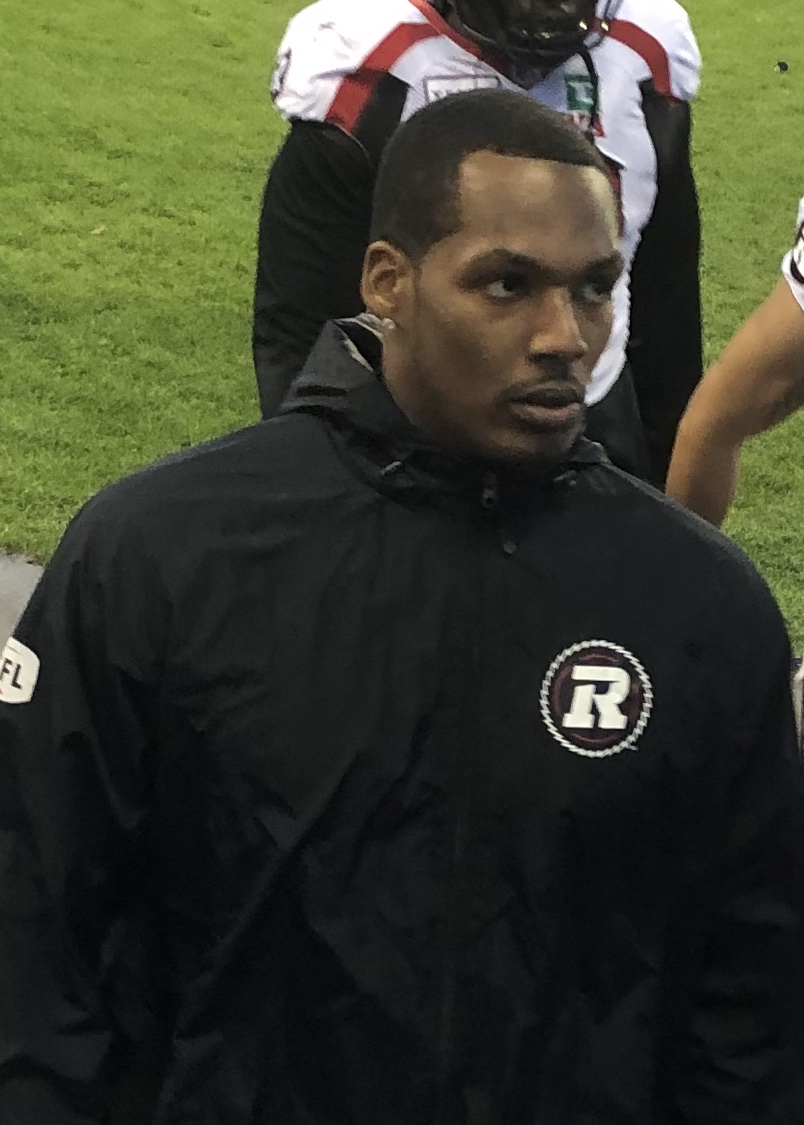
Davis with the Ottawa Redblacks in 2019

On February 12, 2018 Davis signed with the Ottawa Redblacks, replacing Drew Tate as the backup quarterback to Trevor Harris. In 2018 as a backup and short yardage rusher, Davis scored for the first time in his professional career; he completed 24 of 39 passes for 373 yards and 3 touchdowns against one interception, while producing 40 rushes for 73 yards and 6 touchdowns. He also started the final regular season game of the year against the Toronto Argonauts.

Prior to free agency opening, Davis signed an extension with the Redblacks. When the Redblacks were unable to resign starter Trevor Harris, Davis became the assumed starter. However later in the off-season the Redblacks signed free agent pivot Jonathon Jennings to a higher salary to compete for the starting job. Nevertheless, Davis was announced as the starting quarterback for Week 1 of the 2019 season. After winning the first two games of the season, the Redblacks lost the following two games and Davis picked up a minor injury, which lead to Jennings being announced as the club's starting quarterback for the team's Week 6 match. Davis missed two games while recovering from his injury, and returned to action in Week 8. Davis was benched in the first quarter of Redblacks' Week 11 loss to the Saskatchewan Roughriders after throwing three interceptions in his first six pass attempts. Jennings was announced as the starting quarterback following the team's bye week. After both Jennings and third-string quarterback William Arndt struggled the Redblacks turned to Jennings for the final game of the season. The Redblacks finished the year with 3 wins against 15 losses; the only wins came in the first half of the year with Davis as the starting quarterback.

Davis signed a one-year contract extension with the Redblacks on January 7, 2021. Davis opened the 2021 season as the backup to veteran Matt Nichols, however the Redblacks offense started slow to begin the season and by Week 5 Davis came on partway through the match in an attempt to revitalize the passing attack. Davis was named the starting quarterback for the teams Week 6 match against the BC Lions. Davis started the next two games for the Redblacks, losing both matches by a combined score of 69–20, and in the second game was benched in the third quarter against the Tiger-Cats in favour of Matt Nichols. He finished the season having played in six games completing 59 of 98 passing attempts for 674 yards with three touchdowns and four interceptions. Davis was released by the Redblacks on January 13, 2022.

=== Montreal Alouettes (first stint) ===
On February 4, 2022, Davis signed with the Montreal Alouettes. Davis began the season as the third string and short-yardage quarterback behind Vernon Adams Jr. and Trevor Harris. Davis started one game at quarterback for the Alouettes at the end of the regular season, but otherwise was limited to his role as a short-yardage specialist; a role he excelled at as he scored 13 rushing touchdowns. On February 8, 2023, it was reported that Davis had agreed to a contract with the BC Lions.

=== BC Lions ===
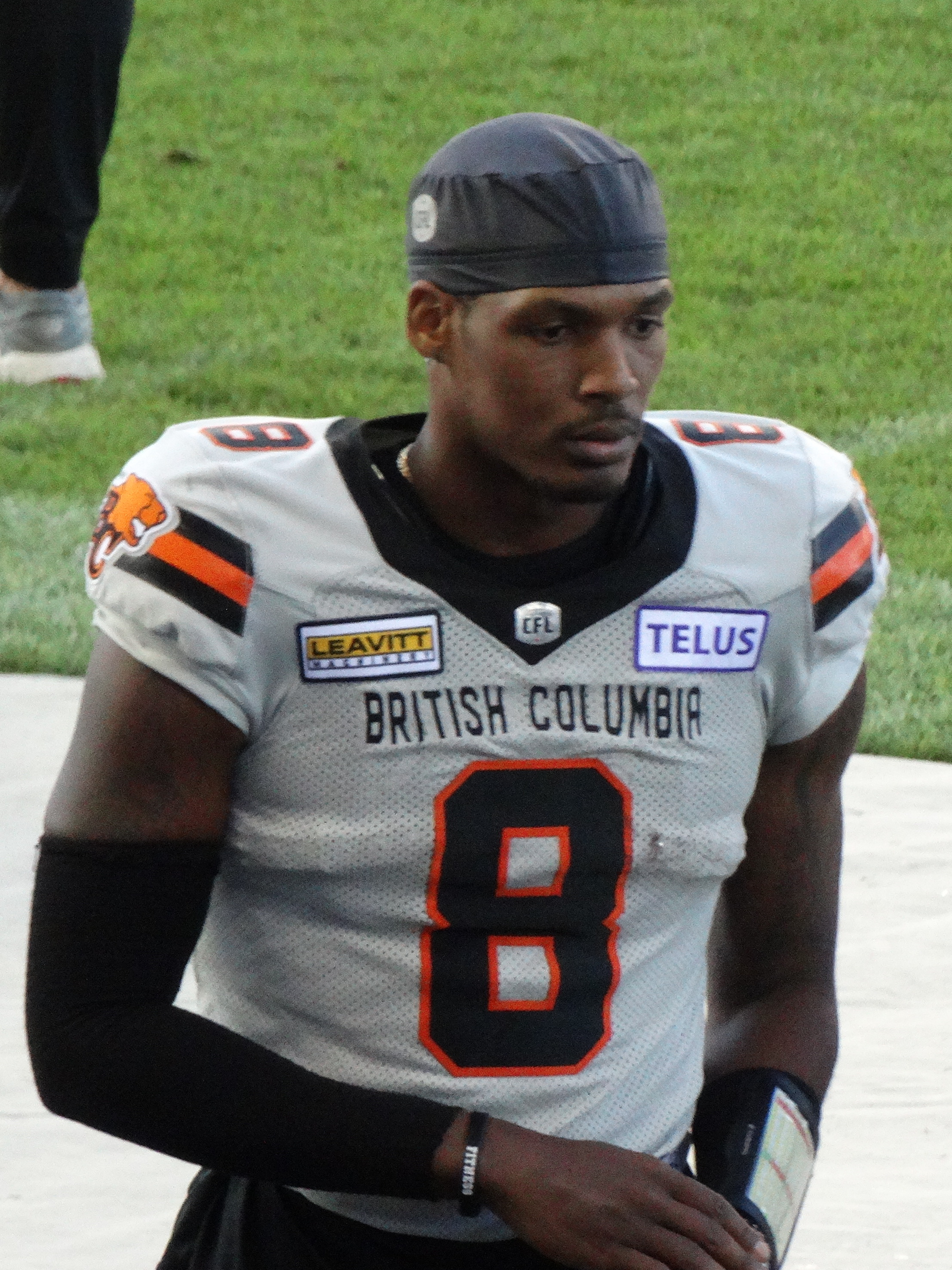
Davis with the BC Lions in 2023

On February 14, 2023, it was announced that Davis had signed a one-year contract with the BC Lions. After a poor performance in the preseason, he was named the third-string quarterback behind Vernon Adams and Dane Evans. Davis was used primarily for short yardage and's got his first touchdown against Winnipeg in week 3. In a game against the Saskatchewan Roughriders, Adams suffered a knee injury and Rick Campbell named Davis the backup to Evans. On February 13, 2024, Davis became a free agent after his contract with the Lions was not renewed.

=== Montreal Alouettes (second stint) ===
After remaining unsigned at the start of the 2024 CFL season, Davis signed with the Montreal Alouettes on August 6, 2024, following an injury to Caleb Evans. He played in ten regular season games as the short yardage quarterback where he had 19 carries for 39 yards and three touchdowns. He became a free agent upon the expiry of his contract on February 11, 2025.

== Personal ==
His brother Desmond Clark played tight end in the NFL for the Denver Broncos, Miami Dolphins and Chicago Bears from 1999 through 2010.
