= C. J. Johnson (American football) =

American football player (born 2000)

No. 5
- Position: Wide receiver

Personal information
- Born: November 4, 2000 (age 26); Greenville, North Carolina, U.S.
- Listed height: 6 ft 2 in (1.88 m)
- Listed weight: 224 lb (102 kg)

Career information
- High school: D. H. Conley (Greenville)
- College: East Carolina
- NFL draft: 2023: undrafted

Career history
- Seattle Seahawks (2023)*; DC Defenders (2024)*
- * Offseason or practice squad member only

Awards and highlights
- Second-team All-AAC (2022)
- Stats at Pro Football Reference

C. J. Johnson (born November 4, 2000) is an American former football wide receiver. He played college football at East Carolina. He was a member of the Seattle Seahawks and DC Defenders.

== Early life ==
Johnson grew up in Greenville, North Carolina, and attended D. H. Conley High School. He finished his high school career with 239 receptions for 5,198 yards and 79 touchdowns. Johnson was rated a three-star recruit and committed to play college football at East Carolina over offers from Virginia Tech and North Carolina.

== College career ==
Johnson was named a Freshman All-American by the Football Writers Association of America (FWAA) in his first season at East Carolina after catching 54 passes for 908 yards and four touchdowns. He had 19 receptions for 405 yards and led the Pirates with six touchdowns during his sophomore season. Johnson caught 35 passes for 520 yards and one touchdown as a junior. He was named second team All-American Athletic Conference during his senior season after catching 67 passes for 1,016 yards and ten touchdowns.

== Professional career ==
Pre-draft measurables
Height	Weight	Arm length	Hand span	40-yard dash	10-yard split	20-yard split	20-yard shuttle	Vertical jump	Broad jump
6 ft 1 1/2 in (1.87 m)	224 lb (102 kg)	32 in (0.81 m)	10 1/4 in (0.26 m)	4.67 s	1.69 s	2.70 s	4.53 s	36.0 in (0.91 m)	10 ft 0 in (3.05 m)

=== Seattle Seahawks ===
Johnson signed with the Seattle Seahawks as an undrafted free agent on April 29, 2023, shortly after the conclusion of the 2023 NFL draft. On June 5, Johnson was waived by the Seahawks.

=== DC Defenders ===
Johnson was selected by the DC Defenders in the 2023 XFL Rookie Draft on June 16, 2023. He was signed on December 14, 2023. On January 15, 2024, Johnson was selected by the Defenders in the eighth round of the Super Draft portion of the 2024 UFL dispersal draft. He was released on March 10, 2024.
