= 2018 East Carolina Pirates football team =

American college football season

2018 East Carolina Pirates football
- Conference: American Athletic Conference
- East Division
- Record: 3–9 (1–7 The American)
- Head coach: Scottie Montgomery (3rd season; first 11 games); David Blackwell (interim; final game)
- Offensive coordinator: Tony Petersen (3rd season)
- Offensive scheme: Multiple
- Defensive coordinator: David Blackwell (1st season)
- Base defense: 3–4
- Home stadium: Dowdy-Ficklen Stadium

Uniform
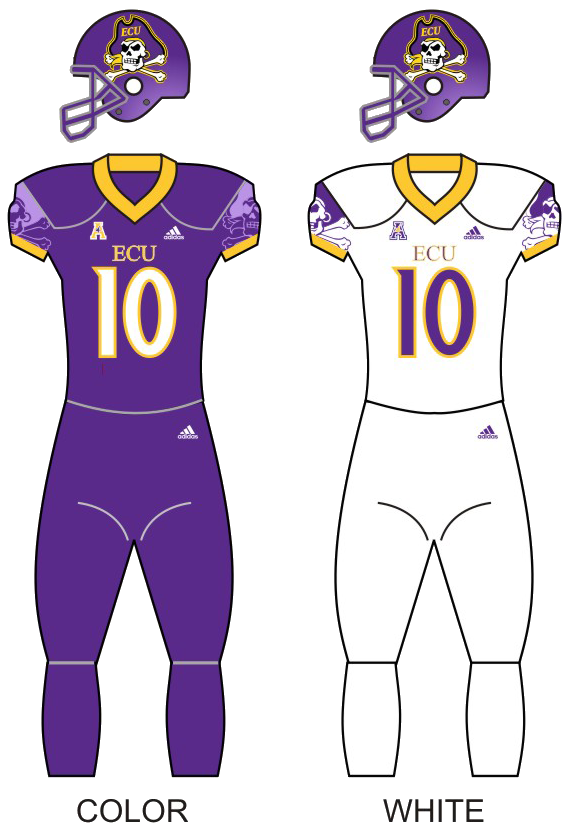

2018 American Athletic Conference football standings
	Conf.			Overall
Team	W		L	W		L
East Division
No. 11 UCF x$	8	–	0	12	–	1
Temple	7	–	1	8	–	5
No. 24 Cincinnati	6	–	2	11	–	2
South Florida	3	–	5	7	–	6
East Carolina	1	–	7	3	–	9
UConn	0	–	8	1	–	11
West Division
Memphis xy	5	–	3	8	–	6
Houston x	5	–	3	8	–	5
Tulane x	5	–	3	7	–	6
SMU	4	–	4	5	–	7
Navy	2	–	6	3	–	10
Tulsa	2	–	6	3	–	9
Championship: UCF 56, Memphis 41
$ – Conference champion; x – Division champion/co-champions; y – Championship game participant; Rankings from AP Poll

The 2018 East Carolina Pirates football team represented East Carolina University in the 2018 NCAA Division I FBS football season. The Pirates, led by third-year head coach Scottie Montgomery, played their home games at Dowdy-Ficklen Stadium, and were members of the East Division in the American Athletic Conference. They finished the season 3–9, 1–7 in AAC play to finish in fifth place in the East Division.

On November 29, head coach Scottie Montgomery was fired. He finished his tenure at East Carolina with a three-year record of 9–26. Defensive coordinator David Blackwell was the interim head coach during their final game of the season. On December 3, ECU hired James Madison head coach Mike Houston as their new head coach.

== Preseason ==
=== Award watch lists ===
Listed in the order that they were released

Award	Player	Position	Year
Fred Biletnikoff Award	Trevon Brown	WR	SR
Wuerffel Trophy	Garrett McGhin	OL	SR

=== AAC media poll ===
The AAC media poll was released on July 24, 2018, with the Pirates predicted to finish in last place in the AAC East Division.

Media poll (East)
Predicted finish	Team	Votes (1st place)
1	UCF	175 (25)
2	USF	140 (5)
3	Temple	132
4	Cincinnati	91
5	UConn	51
6	East Carolina	41

== Schedule ==
Date	Time	Opponent	Site	TV	Result	Attendance
September 2 (Note: The game against North Carolina A&T was originally scheduled for September 1 at 6:00 pm before being postponed to September 2 at 3:30 pm due to inclement weather.)	3:30 p.m.	No. 14 (FCS) North Carolina A&T*	Dowdy–Ficklen Stadium; Greenville, NC	ESPN3	L 23–28	38,640
September 8	3:30 p.m.	North Carolina*	Dowdy–Ficklen Stadium; Greenville, NC	ESPNU	W 41–19	39,298
September 22	8:00 p.m.	at South Florida	Raymond James Stadium; Tampa, FL	ESPNews	L 13–20	34,562
September 29	3:30 p.m.	Old Dominion*	Dowdy–Ficklen Stadium; Greenville, NC	ESPN3	W 37–35	35,047
October 6	12:00 p.m.	at Temple	Lincoln Financial Field; Philadelphia, PA	ESPNews	L 6–49	26,681
October 13	7:00 p.m.	Houston	Dowdy–Ficklen Stadium; Greenville, NC	CBSSN	L 20–42	29,851
October 20	7:00 p.m.	No. 10 UCF^{†}	Dowdy–Ficklen Stadium; Greenville, NC	ESPN2	L 10–37	31,159
November 3	12:00 p.m.	Memphis	Dowdy–Ficklen Stadium; Greenville, NC	ESPNU	L 41–59	29,127
November 10	4:00 p.m.	at Tulane	Yulman Stadium; New Orleans, LA	ESPNews	L 18–24	20,860
November 17	7:00 p.m.	UConn	Dowdy–Ficklen Stadium; Greenville, NC	CBSSN	W 55–21	27,234
November 23	3:30 p.m.	at Cincinnati	Nippert Stadium; Cincinnati, OH	CBSSN	L 6–56	21,230
December 1 (Note: The game between ECU and Virginia Tech, originally scheduled for September 15, 2018, was canceled in anticipation of Hurricane Florence. This game was scheduled on October 2, 2018 to replace East Carolina’s game at Virginia Tech and NC State’s game vs. West Virginia, both of which were canceled due to Hurricane Florence.)	12:00 p.m.	at NC State*	Carter–Finley Stadium; Raleigh, NC (Victory Barrel)	ACCN Extra	L 3–58	57,223
*Non-conference game; ^{†}Homecoming; Rankings from AP Poll (and CFP Rankings, after October 30) - Released prior to game; All times are in Eastern time

Schedule source:

== Game summaries ==
=== North Carolina A&T ===
North Carolina A&T at East Carolina

Team	1	2	3	4	Total
• No. 14 (FCS) Aggies	7	7	0	14	28
Pirates	3	14	3	3	23

- Date: September 2
- Location: Dowdy–Ficklen Stadium
  Greenville, NC
- Game start: 3:30 p.m. EDT
- Elapsed time: 3:41
- Game attendance: 38,640
- Game weather: 90°F • 5–8 mph • Mostly Cloudy
- Referee: Henry Wimberg
- TV announcers (ESPN3): Josh Appel (play-by-play) and Stan Lewter (analyst)

=== North Carolina ===
North Carolina at East Carolina

Team	1	2	3	4	Total
Tar Heels	6	13	0	0	19
• Pirates	7	14	7	13	41

- Date: September 8
- Location: Dowdy–Ficklen Stadium
  Greenville, NC
- Game start: 3:30 p.m. EDT
- Elapsed time: 3:33
- Game attendance: 39,298
- Game weather: 91°F • S 5 • Partly Cloudy
- Referee: Duane Heydt
- TV announcers (ESPNU): Mike Corey (play-by-play) and Rene Ingoglia (analyst)

=== At South Florida ===
East Carolina at South Florida

Team	1	2	3	4	Total
Pirates	7	3	3	0	13
• Bulls	6	7	0	7	20

- Date: September 22
- Location: Raymond James Stadium
  Tampa, FL
- Game start: 8:00 p.m. EDT
- Elapsed time: 3:05
- Game attendance: 34,562
- Referee: Charles Lamerti
- TV announcers (ESPNews): Dave LaMont (play-by-play) and Ray Bentley (analyst)

=== Old Dominion ===
Old Dominion at East Carolina

Team	1	2	3	4	Total
Monarchs	14	6	7	8	35
• Pirates	14	7	7	9	37

- Date: September 29
- Location: Dowdy–Ficklen Stadium
  Greenville, NC
- Game start: 3:30 p.m. EDT
- Elapsed time: 3:26
- Game attendance: 35,047
- Game weather: 84°F • NE 8 • Mostly Clear
- Referee: Rodney Burnette
- TV announcers (ESPN3): Robert Lee (play-by-play) and Tyoka Jackson (analyst)

=== At Temple ===
East Carolina at Temple

Team	1	2	3	4	Total
Pirates	0	3	0	3	6
• Owls	14	21	7	7	49

- Date: October 6
- Location: Lincoln Financial Field
  Philadelphia, PA
- Game start: 12:00 p.m. EDT
- Game attendance: 26,681
- TV announcers (ESPNews): Bill Roth (play-by-play) and Ray Bentley (analyst)

=== Houston ===
Houston at East Carolina

Team	1	2	3	4	Total
• Cougars	14	7	7	14	42
Pirates	0	3	3	14	20

- Date: October 13
- Location: Dowdy–Ficklen Stadium
  Greenville, NC
- Game start: 7:00 p.m. EDT
- Game attendance: 29,851
- TV announcers (CBSSN): Dave Ryan (play-by-play) and Corey Chavous (analyst)

=== UCF ===
UCF at East Carolina

Team	1	2	3	4	Total
• No. 10 Knights	0	20	3	14	37
Pirates	3	0	7	0	10

- Date: October 20
- Location: Dowdy–Ficklen Stadium
  Greenville, NC
- Game start: 7:00 p.m. EDT
- Game attendance: 31,159
- TV announcers (ESPN2): Beth Mowins(play-by-play), Anthony Becht (analyst), and Rocky Boiman (sideline)

=== Memphis ===
Memphis at East Carolina

Team	1	2	3	4	Total
• Tigers	10	14	14	21	59
Pirates	14	3	17	7	41

- Date: November 3
- Location: Dowdy–Ficklen Stadium
  Greenville, NC
- Game start: 12:00pm ET EDT
- Game attendance: 29,127
- TV announcers (ESPNU): Mike Corey and Rene Ingoglia

The high-scoring affair features a combined 1,200 yards by the two teams. Holton Ahlers, in his second start in relief of Reid Herring, led the Pirates in both rushing (17 carries for 57 yards) and passing, completing 34 of his 62 passes for 449 yards (fourth in school history to Shane Carden's 480 in 2013, Blake Kemp's 465 in 2015, and Gardner Minshew's 463 in 217) and three touchdowns without an interception. Trevon Brown had 10 receptions for 193 yards (eighth in ECU history) and two of those touchdowns. The second of these tied the game at 31 midway through the third quarter, but the Pirates were outscored 28-17 the rest of the way in the loss.

=== At Tulane ===
East Carolina at Tulane

Team	1	2	3	4	Total
Pirates	3	7	0	8	18
• Green Wave	7	7	7	3	24

- Date: November 10
- Location: Yulman Stadium
  New Orleans, LA
- Game start: 4:00 p.m. EDT
- Game attendance: 20,860
- Game weather: Sunny, 54 °F (12 °C)
- Referee: Mike Roche
- TV announcers (ESPNews): Jay Alter and Dustin Fox

=== UConn ===
UConn at East Carolina

Team	1	2	3	4	Total
Huskies	7	14	0	0	21
• Pirates	7	27	14	7	55

- Date: November 17
- Location: Dowdy–Ficklen Stadium
  Greenville, NC
- Game start: 7:00 p.m. EDT
- Game attendance: 27,234
- TV announcers (CBS Sports Network): Dave Ryan and Corey Chavous

=== At Cincinnati ===
East Carolina at Cincinnati

Team	1	2	3	4	Total
Pirates	0	6	0	0	6
• Bearcats	21	21	7	7	56

- Date: November 23
- Location: Nippert Stadium
  Cincinnati, OH
- Game start: 3:30 p.m. EDT
- Game attendance: 21,230
- TV announcers (CBS Sports Network): Dave Ryan and Corey Chavous

=== At NC State ===
East Carolina at NC State

Team	1	2	3	4	Total
Pirates	0	0	0	3	3
• Wolfpack	17	10	14	17	58

- Date: December 1
- Location: Carter–Finley Stadium
  Raleigh, NC
- Game start: 12:00 p.m. EST
- Game attendance: 57,223
- Game weather: Mostly Cloudy
- Referee: C. Lamertine
- TV announcers (ACCN Extra): Kevin Fitzgerald and Stan Lewter

Note: This game was scheduled on October 2, 2018, to replace NC State's game vs. West Virginia and East Carolina's game at Virginia Tech, both of which were canceled due to Hurricane Florence. This game will not take place if either NC State or ECU qualifies for their respective conference championship.
