= Shane Carden =

American football player and coach (born 1991)

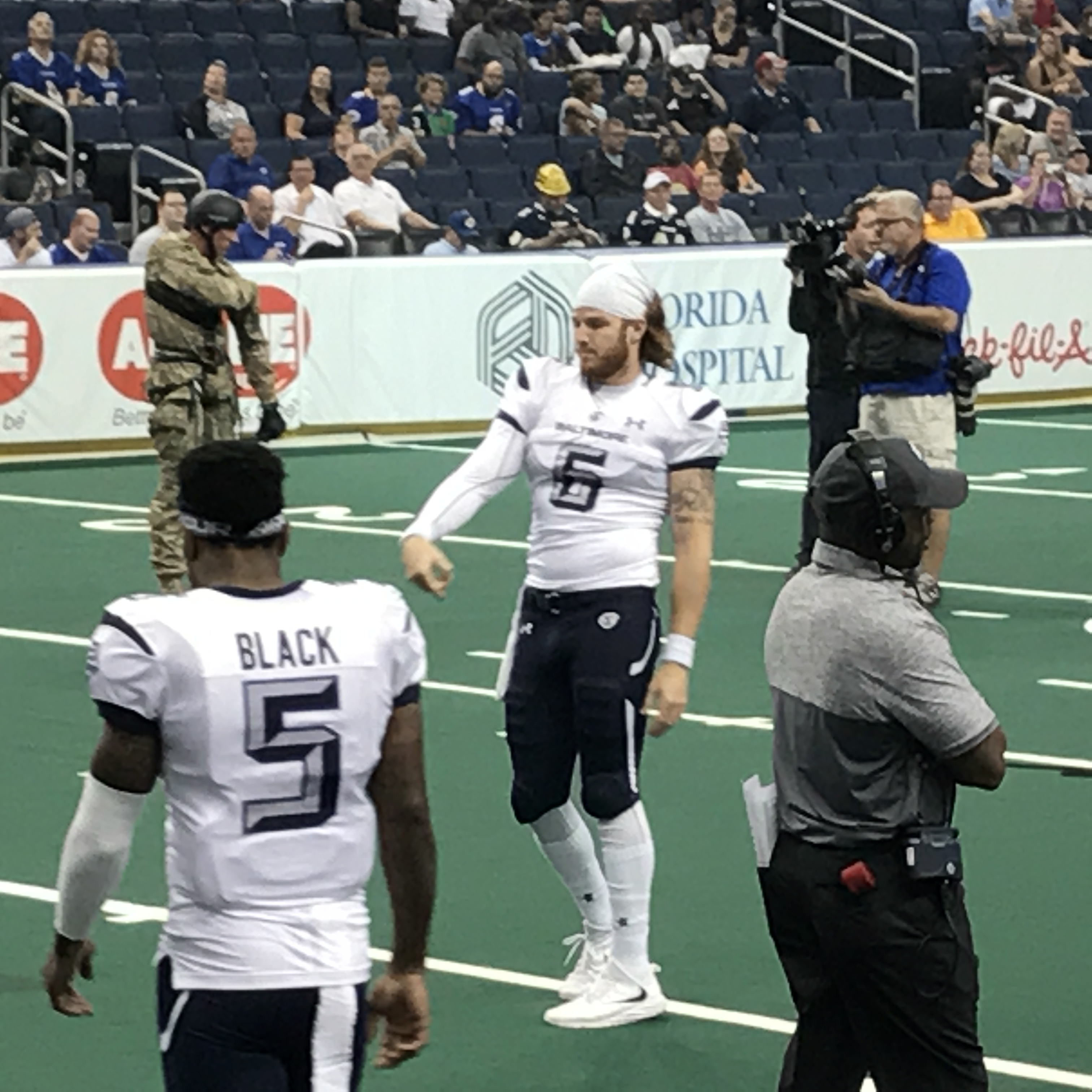
- Carden (#6) with the Baltimore Brigade in 2017

No. 6
- Position: Quarterback

Personal information
- Born: November 6, 1991 (age 35); Newport Beach, California, U.S.
- Listed height: 6 ft 2 in (1.88 m)
- Listed weight: 218 lb (99 kg)

Career information
- High school: Episcopal (Bellaire, Texas)
- College: East Carolina
- NFL draft: 2015: undrafted

Career history

Playing
- Chicago Bears (2015)*; Stuttgart Scorpions (2016); Montreal Alouettes (2016); Baltimore Brigade (2017)
- * Offseason or practice squad member only

Coaching
- Wood River High School (2018) Offensive coordinator; Wood River High School (2019–present) Head coach

Awards and highlights
- AFL Rookie of the Year (2017); AAC Offensive Player of the Year (2014); First-team All-AAC (2014); C-USA MVP (2013); First-team All-C-USA (2013)

Career CFL statistics
- Rushing attempts: 2
- Rushing yards: 2
- Stats at CFL.ca

Career AFL statistics
- Comp. / Att.: 275 / 431
- Passing yards: 3,189
- TD–INT: 63–16
- QB rating: 107.16
- Rushing TD: 8
- Stats at ArenaFan.com
- Stats at Pro Football Reference

Shane Michael Carden (born November 6, 1991) is an American former football quarterback, and current Wood River High School head football coach. He was the MVP of Conference USA as a Junior while playing quarterback for East Carolina in 2013 and the American Athletic Conference Offensive Player of the Year during his Senior year in 2014. After his college career at ECU he was signed by the Chicago Bears as an undrafted free agent in 2015.

He also played with the Stuttgart Scorpions of the German Football League, the Montreal Alouettes of the Canadian Football League (CFL) and the Baltimore Brigade of the Arena Football League (AFL).

== Early life ==
Carden was born in Newport Beach, California and moved to Houston, Texas. He attended Episcopal High School in Bellaire, Texas.

College recruiting
| Name | Hometown | School | Height | Weight | 40^{‡} | Commit date |
|---|---|---|---|---|---|---|
| Shane Carden; QB | Huntington Beach, California | Episcopal High School (Bellaire, Texas) | 6 ft 3 in (1.91 m) | 205 lb (93 kg) | – | Mar 2, 2010 |
| Shane Carden; QB | Recruit ratings: Scout: Rivals: 247Sports: ESPN: (NR) | | | | | |
Overall recruit ranking: Scout: 160 (QB) 247Sports: 2,336 ESPN: NR
Note: In many cases, Scout, Rivals, 247Sports, On3, and ESPN may conflict in their listings of height and weight.; In these cases, the average was taken. ESPN grades are on a 100-point scale.; Sources:

== College career ==
Carden was redshirted as a freshman in 2010 after not beating out Dominique Davis. In 2011, he appeared in one game as a wide receiver. After entering his sophomore season in 2012 as a backup, Carden started the team's third game and remained the starter the rest of the season. He finished the season completing 273 of 413 passes for 3,116 yards, 23 touchdowns and 10 interceptions. In 2013, he started all 13 games, completing 387 of 549 passes for a school record 4,139 yards, 33 touchdowns and 10 interceptions. He also rushed for ten touchdowns. For his play he was named the Conference USA Most Valuable Player. During his senior season in 2014, Carden set the school record for career passing yards and passing touchdowns, passing David Garrard and Dominique Davis' records. He finished the season completing 392 of 617 passes for 4,736 yards (breaking the previous year's record), 30 touchdowns and 10 interceptions. For his play, he was named the American Athletic Conference Offensive Player of the Year.

Carden ended his career with 11,991 passing yards, 86 touchdowns and 30 interceptions.

=== College statistics ===
| Year | Team | Games | | | Passing | | | | | | | | Rushing | | | |
| Year | Team | GP | GS | Record | Cmp | Att | Pct | Yds | Avg | TD | Int | Rtg | Att | Yds | Avg | TD |
|---|---|---|---|---|---|---|---|---|---|---|---|---|---|---|---|---|
| 2010 | East Carolina | (redshirt) Redshirted | | | | | | | | | | | | | | |
| 2011 | East Carolina | 1 | 0 | — | 0 | 0 | 0.0 | 0 | 0.0 | 0 | 0 | 0.0 | 0 | 0 | 0.0 | 0 |
| 2012 | East Carolina | 13 | 11 | 7−4 | 273 | 413 | 66.2 | 3,116 | 7.5 | 23 | 10 | 143.0 | 85 | 74 | 0.9 | 8 |
| 2013 | East Carolina | 13 | 13 | 10−3 | 387 | 549 | 70.5 | 4,139 | 7.5 | 33 | 10 | 150.0 | 90 | 103 | 1.1 | 10 |
| 2014 | East Carolina | 13 | 13 | 8−5 | 392 | 617 | 63.5 | 4,736 | 7.7 | 30 | 10 | 140.8 | 96 | 76 | 0.8 | 6 |
| Career | | 40 | 37 | 25−12 | 1,052 | 1,579 | 66.6 | 11,991 | 7.6 | 86 | 30 | 144.6 | 271 | 253 | 0.9 | 24 |

== Professional career ==
Carden was rated the tenth best quarterback in the 2015 NFL draft by NFLDraftScout.com. Lance Zierlein of NFL.com predicted that he would be selected in the seventh round. Zierlein said that Carden "Lacks the desired play traits that NFL teams look for, but his production and poise on the move are undeniable and he is a very quick processor on the field."

Pre-draft measurables
| Height | Weight | Arm length | Hand span | 40-yard dash | 10-yard split | 20-yard split | 20-yard shuttle | Three-cone drill | Vertical jump | Broad jump | Wonderlic |
|---|---|---|---|---|---|---|---|---|---|---|---|
| 6 ft 1 7/8 in (1.88 m) | 218 lb (99 kg) | 33 1/4 in (0.84 m) | 9 3/4 in (0.25 m) | 4.94 s | 1.74 s | 2.88 s | 4.45 s | 7.17 s | 29.5 in (0.75 m) | 8 ft 8 in (2.64 m) | 25 |
All values from NFL Combine

=== Chicago Bears ===
After going undrafted in the 2015 NFL draft, he signed with the Chicago Bears. On September 1, 2015, he was released by the Bears.

=== Stuttgart Scorpions ===
In 2016 after being released from the Bears, he signed with the Stuttgart Scorpions of the German Football League. Carden passed for 3258 yards in 14 games and 36 touchdowns with 13 interceptions. He had a 145.8 passer rating as the Scorpions finished with a 7–7 record.

=== Montreal Alouettes ===
Carden was signed by the Montreal Alouettes (CFL) on September 14, 2016, partway through the 2016 CFL season. During the season, he carried the ball twice for two yards. He was released by the Alouettes on February 7, 2017.

=== Baltimore Brigade ===
Carden signed with the Baltimore Brigade in February 2017. He relieved starter Chase Cartwright in the second quarter of the first game of the season. Carden then started the next 12 games for the Brigade. He suffered a concussion on July 29 against the Philadelphia Soul, and was placed on injured reserve on August 2. Carden played in 13 out of 14 regular season games, starting 12, in 2017, completing 275 of 431 passes for 3,189 yards, 63 touchdowns and 16 interceptions. He also rushed for 110 yards and 8 touchdowns. He became the first rookie quarterback since 2011 to throw for over 3,000 yards. On August 23, 2017, Carden was named the AFL Rookie of the Year.

== Coaching career ==
Prior to the 2019 season, Carden was named the head coach at Wood River High School in Hailey, Idaho. He served as the Wood River offensive coordinator in 2018.

== Personal ==
Carden's father, Jay Carden, played minor league baseball from 1963 to 1970.

After his redshirt sophomore season, Carden got a tattoo on his left bicep depicting the outline of North Carolina with the East Carolina Pirates logo inside it. The pirate's eyepatch featured his jersey number 5. Carden first saw the tattoo design on teammate Damon Magazu.
