= Lance Lewis =

American football player (born 1988)

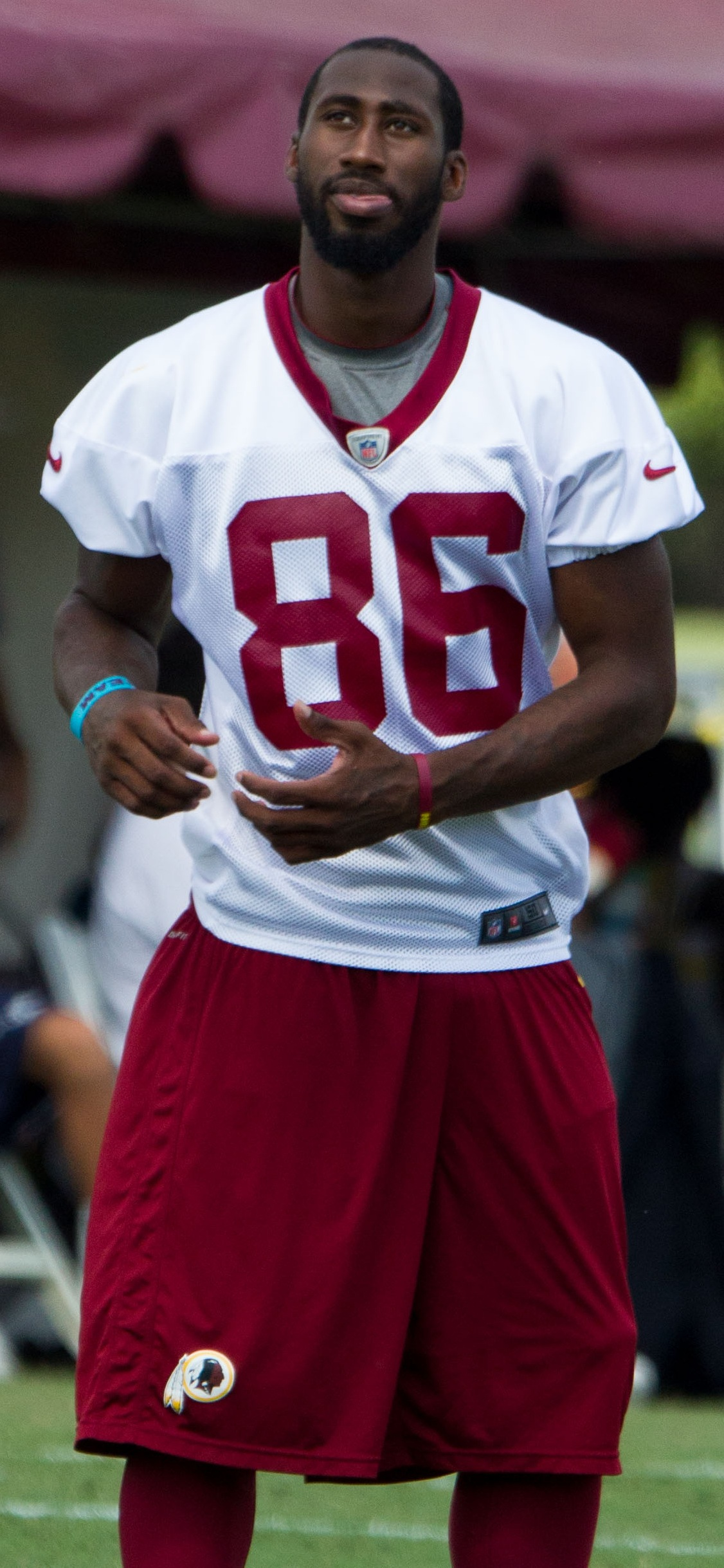
- Lewis at Redskins training camp in 2012

No. 18, 86
- Position: Wide receiver

Personal information
- Born: November 1, 1988 (age 38); Concord, North Carolina, U.S.
- Listed height: 6 ft 3 in (1.91 m)
- Listed weight: 209 lb (95 kg)

Career information
- High school: Concord
- College: East Carolina
- NFL draft: 2012: undrafted

Career history
- Washington Redskins (2012–2013); Dallas Cowboys (2013–2014)*; San Francisco 49ers (2014–2015)*; New Orleans Saints (2015)*; Bismarck Bucks (2017)
- * Offseason or practice squad member only

Awards and highlights
- 2× Second-team All-C-USA (2010, 2011)
- Stats at Pro Football Reference

Lance Lewis (born November 1, 1988) is an American former professional football wide receiver. He was signed by the Washington Redskins as an undrafted free agent in 2012. He played college football for the East Carolina Pirates. He has also played for the Dallas Cowboys and San Francisco 49ers.

== Professional career ==
=== Washington Redskins ===
Lewis was signed by the Washington Redskins as an undrafted free agent on April 29, 2012. In early August, he suffered a groin injury that caused him to be inactive for the 2012 preseason. He was waived with an injury settlement on August 27.

Lewis returned to the Redskins on May 14, 2013, following a successful tryout during the team's rookie mini-camp in early May. The Redskins waived him on August 31, 2013, for final roster cuts before the start of 2013 season, he was signed to the team's practice squad the next day. Lewis was signed to the active roster on November 21, 2013, after the team placed Leonard Hankerson to injured reserve. He was waived on December 18, 2013.

=== Dallas Cowboys ===
On December 20, 2013, Lewis signed to the practice squad of the Dallas Cowboys. Ten days later, the Cowboys signed him to a futures contract.

=== San Francisco 49ers ===
Lewis signed a two-year deal with the San Francisco 49ers on August 9, 2014. Lewis was waived on April 30, 2015.

=== New Orleans Saints ===
On May 19, 2015, Lewis signed with the New Orleans Saints. The Saints waived him on September 1 as part of final roster cuts before the start of the season.

=== Bismarck Bucks ===
Joined the Bismarck Bucks of the Champions Indoor Football League (CIF).
