= D. H. Conley High School =

American public school in North Carolina

D.H. Conley High School

Location
- 2006 Worthington Rd; Greenville, North Carolina 27858; United States; 35°31′49″N 77°19′29″W

Information
- School type: Public
- Motto: In union there is strength.
- Established: 1970 (56 years ago)
- School district: Pitt County Schools
- Superintendent: Steve M. Lassiter, Jr.
- CEEB code: 341640
- Principal: Mr. T.J. Worrell
- Faculty: 90.89 (on an FTE basis)
- Grades: 9–12
- Enrollment: 1,757 (2024–25)
- Student to teacher ratio: 19.33
- Campus type: Suburb
- Colors: Navy blue and gold
- Mascot: Viking
- Newspaper: The Shield
- Yearbook: Valkyrian
- Feeder schools: Hope Middle School, Chicod School, G. R. Whitfield School
- Website: dhc.pitt.k12.nc.us

Donald Hayes Conley High School (D. H. Conley) is a high school in Greenville, North Carolina. The school was founded in 1970 and named for Donald Hayes Conley (1902–1992), an educational leader and former superintendent of Pitt County Schools.

== Athletics ==
D.H. Conley is a member of the North Carolina High School Athletic Association (NCHSAA) and competes in the 6A/7A Big Carolina Conference. The school offers many sports for students, including softball, volleyball, soccer, baseball, football, swimming, tennis, basketball, wrestling, track, cross country, and cheerleading.

=== State Championships ===
D.H. Conley has won the following NCHSAA team state championships:

- Baseball: 2005 (4A), 2006 (3A)
- Boys Basketball: 1987 (3A), 1990 (3A)
- Softball: 2011 (3A), 2013 (3A), 2015 (4A), 2022 (4A)
- Volleyball: 1986 (3A), 2007 (3A), 2020–21 (3A)
- Wrestling Individual Team: 1995 (3A)

== Notable alumni ==
- Holton Ahlers – professional football quarterback, played collegiately at East Carolina
- Keith Gatlin – professional basketball player and assistant college coach with the High Point Panthers
- Rico Hines – NBA player development coach with the Sacramento Kings and former UCLA basketball player
- James Johnson – former American Greco-Roman wrestler and coach
- Bronswell Patrick – former MLB relief pitcher
- Alex White – former MLB pitcher
- Dixon Williams – professional baseball player drafted by the Atlanta Braves, played collegiately at East Carolina
