= Holton Ahlers =

American football player (born 1999)

No. 15
- Position: Quarterback

Personal information
- Born: November 10, 1999 (age 26); Greenville, North Carolina, U.S.
- Listed height: 6 ft 3 in (1.91 m)
- Listed weight: 227 lb (103 kg)

Career information
- High school: D. H. Conley (Greenville)
- College: East Carolina (2018–2022)
- NFL draft: 2023: undrafted

Career history
- Seattle Seahawks (2023)*; Arlington Renegades (2024–2025)
- * Offseason or practice squad member only
- Stats at Pro Football Reference

Holton Maddux Ahlers (AYE-lurrs; born November 10, 1999) is an American former professional football quarterback. He played college football for the East Carolina Pirates. Ahlers is the career leader in passing yards, total offensive yards, passing touchdowns, touchdowns responsible for, completions, pass attempts, and rushing touchdowns by a quarterback in East Carolina history. Ahlers also played for the Arlington Renegades of the United Football League (UFL).

== Early life ==
Ahlers was born on November 10, 1999, in Greenville, North Carolina. He attended and played football, baseball, and basketball for D. H. Conley High School in Greenville. As a four-year starter and a team captain, Ahlers he led D. H. Conley to four straight playoff appearances and three conference titles. He was one of North Carolina's most prolific passers as he finished as the state's third all-time leader in passing yards with 11,198. He also finished second all-time in total offensive yards with 14,784. While also being third all-time in passing yards, he was also third in touchdowns responsible for with 201, passing touchdowns with 145 and fifth and sixth respectively in pass completions with 670 and pass attempts with 1,157. He was a three-time First Team All-Conference selection, two-time Conference Player of the Year, two-time Greenville Daily Reflector's First Team All-Conference, and received the Raleigh News & Observer All-Metro Quarterback honors.

As a sophomore in 2015, Ahlers threw for 2,457 yards and ran for 1,142 and was named team MVP and earned All-County honors. He accounted for 42 total touchdowns.

As a junior in 2016, Ahlers was an Associated Press All-State choice and a 252 ESPN Radio Player of the Year as he gained 5,414 total yards and 66 total touchdowns. He threw for 51 touchdowns against nine interceptions and rushed for 911 yards and 15 touchdowns. Against Charles B. Aycock High School in an 83–68 victory he set the single-game total offense record of 618 yards, beating the previous record that was set a week prior against JH Rose High School in a 67–77 loss.

As a senior in 2017, Ahlers and the Vikings finished 11–2 and a 3A/4A conference title, finishing 6–0 in conference play, and an appearance in the state playoffs. He was named Raleigh News & Observer Player of the Year and earned Greenville Daily Reflector's First-Team All-State honors. He accounted for 75 total touchdowns, which was good enough for second all-time in a season. He finished the season going 223 of 358 passing for 3,763 yards and 61 passing touchdowns to only four interceptions. He added 933 rushing yards and 14 touchdowns. Out of 13 games, he surpassed the 300-yard mark in six, including a season-high 464 against West Craven High School. He was also named as the Pitt County Post Offensive Player of the Year and received an invite to the Shrine Bowl where he won most valuable player.

Ahlers was a consensus three-star recruit among the major recruiting databases. He was recruited by Colorado State, Minnesota, NC State, West Virginia, and others before on January 30, 2017, he committed to East Carolina.

College recruiting
Name	Hometown	School	Height	Weight	Commit date
Holton Ahlers; QB	Greenville, North Carolina	D.H. Conley High School	6 ft 4 in (1.93 m)	230 lb (100 kg)	Jan 30, 2017
Holton Ahlers; QB	Recruit ratings: Scout: Rivals: 247Sports: ESPN:				
Overall recruit ranking: 247Sports: 543
Note: In many cases, Scout, Rivals, 247Sports, On3, and ESPN may conflict in their listings of height and weight.; In these cases, the average was taken. ESPN grades are on a 100-point scale.; Sources: "2018 Team Ranking". Rivals.com.

== College career ==
=== 2018 ===
In 2018, Ahlers played in ten games and started five. He made his college football debut in week 2 against North Carolina, where he attempted one incomplete pass and ran eight times for 36 yards and two touchdowns, the first of which coming in the second quarter to give the Pirates the lead. His second came early in the fourth as the game was already out of reach for North Carolina, East Carolina went on to win 41–19. He played sparingly against South Florida, Old Dominion, and Temple. Against Houston, after starter James Herring and backup Kingsley Alpaki were benched due to poor play, Ahlers came in in the fourth quarter and led East Carolina to two scoring drives, both of which touchdowns by him, finishing the game 11 of 18 for 137 yards and a touchdown alongside being the team's leading rusher with 45 yards on five attempts and a touchdown. He earned his first career start against UCF the next week and went 29 of 53 for 406 yards and a touchdown and an interception in a 10–37 loss. He started the following four weeks against Memphis, Tulane, UConn, and Cincinnati. Against Memphis, even though he lost 41–59, Ahlers had three touchdown passes. After losing to Tulane 18–24 the next week, he led the team to its third and final win on the season against UConn, where he went 22 of 31 for 242 yards and a career-high four touchdowns. He added 130 rushing yards and another touchdown on 12 carries. He finished the year with a 6–56 loss to Cincinnati in which he suffered an injury to his knee and non-throwing hand, causing him to miss the season finale against NC State.

=== 2019 ===
In 2019, Ahlers started all 12 games for the Pirates after winning the starting job over the offseason. He finished the season with 3,387 yards and 21 touchdowns. In the season-opener against NC State he went 22 of 39 for 168 yards and an interception before being pulled in favor of Reid late in the game. In the team's home-opener against Gardner–Webb the next week, Ahlers went 18 of 29 for 195 yards and one interception and touchdown, as well as two rushing touchdowns and 85 yards on the ground, in a 48–9 win. He struggled against Navy in a 10–42 loss before winning back-to-back against William & Mary and Old Dominion. In the game against Cincinnati he set an East Carolina record for passing yards and total yards in a game with 535 and 556 respectively, and threw for four touchdowns in a 43–46 loss. The next week he completed 32 of 42 passes for 498 yards and a school record six touchdowns in a 51–59 loss to SMU. East Carolina won their final and fourth game on the season the following week against UConn. Against the Huskies he went 34 for 50 for 374 yards and one touchdown alongside two interceptions. On the ground he also tallied 22 yards and a touchdown in a 31–24 win.

=== 2020 ===
In 2020, Ahler started eight of nine games, missing only the game against Navy due to COVID-19 protocol, and threw for 1,921 yards and 18 touchdowns. He was named to the Manning Award and Wuerffel Trophy watch lists. By Athlon Sports he was a Fourth-Team Preseason All-AAC selection. In the season opener, Ahler went 14 of 29 for 215 yards and three touchdowns in a 28–51 loss to No. 13 UCF. After losing to Georgia State 29–49, the team bounced back against South Florida. In that game he went 17-for-26 for 222 yards and three touchdowns. The team lost four-straight against Navy (which Ahlers missed due to COVID-19), Tulsa, Tulane, and Cincinnati. In his return from COVID-19 he went 38-for-50 for 330 yards and three touchdowns as the team narrowly lost 30–34. In the second-to-last game of the season against Temple, Ahlers led the Pirates past Temple with two touchdowns through the air while tallying another on the ground. To finish off the season he went 20 of 29 for 298 yards and four touchdowns in a 52–38 win over SMU to finish the season with three wins.

=== 2021 ===
In 2021, Ahlers started all 12 games, finishing the season with 3,126 passing yards and 18 touchdowns. He was named to the Third-Team Preseason All-AAC pick by Phil Steele's College Football Preview and a Fourth-Team Preseason All-AAC selection once again by Athlon Sports. During the season he became one of four active FBS quarterbacks with 10,000 career passing yards and 1,000 career rushing yards. He was named to the 2021 NFLPA Collegiate Bowl Big Board watch list while also being on the midseason watch list for the Davey O'Brien Award. Ahlers started the season off going 22 of 40 for 295 yards, two touchdowns, and an interception in a 19–33 loss to Appalachian State. In the rivalry game against Marshall, he threw for 368 yards and two touchdowns and rushed for another touchdown in the 42–38 victory. After winning back-to-back against Charleston Southern and a 52-point performance against Tulane, East Carolina dropped back-to-back games against UCF and Houston. The team then won four-straight games. Against South Florida, Ahlers threw four touchdowns and against Navy he threw three before struggling against Memphis despite the win with two interceptions. He bounced back against Temple with another three-touchdown performance. He was bested once again by Ridder and Cincinnati as they lost their last regular season game 13–35. The team finished the season with a 7–5 record and earned a bid in the Military Bowl against Boston College, which was ultimately canceled due to COVID-19.

=== 2022 ===
In 2022, Ahlers started all 13 games leading the Pirates to a career-best eight wins and their first bowl win since 2014. Prior to the season he was once again named to the Wuerffel Trophy watch list, and was also on the watch list for the Golden Arm Award, Davey O'Brien Award, and the Reese's Senior Bowl. For the third-straight year he was named Fourth-Team Preseason All-AAC team by Athlon Sports. He finished his career as the lone active quarterback with 13,000 career passing yards. In the season-opener, Ahlers could not get over the hump of No. 13 NC State as he threw two interceptions and two touchdowns in a narrow 20–21 loss. He went 25 of 39 for 270 yards and two touchdowns in a win against Old Dominion, and the next week he was 17 of 20 for 263 yards and three touchdowns in a win over Campbell. He threw for a tied career-high and team-record six touchdowns in a win over South Florida. He then struggled against Tulane and lost 9–24. Ahlers led East Carolina past UCF and BYU before being stumped by Cincinnati and Houston. Ahlers tossed three touchdown passes, including the game-winning strike with a minute left, to beat Temple 49–46. East Carolina finished the regular season 7–5 and earned a bid in the Birmingham Bowl against Coastal Carolina. In Ahlers' final career game, he completed 26 of 38 passes for 300 yards and five touchdowns. His five passing touchdowns was a Birmingham Bowl record, but as he tallied another touchdown on the ground, his total of six touchdowns were also a bowl record. The Pirates won 53–29.

Following the season, Ahlers was named to the NFLPA Collegiate Bowl, where he went nine of 12 for 189 yards and a touchdown, leading the American Team to a 19–17 win over the National Team and winning game MVP honors. He was also invited to the 2023 Hula Bowl where he played for Team Kai. He threw a touchdown to Michael Ezeike and led his team to a 16–13 win, earning game MVP honors.

=== East Carolina records ===
Career records:

- Passing yards: 13,933
- Total offensive yards: 15,373
- Passing touchdowns: 97
- Touchdowns responsible for: 122
- Completions: 1,127
- Pass attempts: 1,857
- Rushing touchdowns by a quarterback: 25

Single season records:

- Passing efficiency rating: 151.1 (2022)

Single game records:

- Passing yards: 535 (2019 vs. Cincinnati)
- Touchdown passes: 6 (2019 vs. SMU; 2022 vs. South Florida)
- Total yards: 556 (2019 vs. Cincinnati)

=== American Athletic Conference records ===
Career records:

- Total plays: 2,326
- Total offensive yards: 15,373
- Completions: 1,127
- Pass attempts: 1,857
- Passing yards: 13,933
- Touchdowns responsible for: 122

Birmingham Bowl records:

- Touchdown passes: 5 (2022)
- Touchdowns responsible for: 6 (2022)

== Professional career ==
Pre-draft measurables
Height	Weight	Arm length	Hand span	40-yard dash	10-yard split	20-yard split	20-yard shuttle	Three-cone drill	Vertical jump	Broad jump
6 ft 2 3/4 in (1.90 m)	237 lb (108 kg)	32 1/4 in (0.82 m)	9 3/4 in (0.25 m)	4.95 s	1.77 s	2.89 s	4.53 s	7.21 s	28.0 in (0.71 m)	9 ft 3 in (2.82 m)
All values from East Carolina's Pro Day

=== Seattle Seahawks ===
After going undrafted in the 2023 NFL draft, Ahlers signed with the Seattle Seahawks on May 12, 2023. He was waived on August 29, and re-signed to the practice squad. Ahlers was released on September 11, and later re-signed a month later. He was released again on October 18.

=== Arlington Renegades ===
On December 26, 2023, Ahlers was signed by the Arlington Renegades of the XFL. He re-signed with the team on September 27, 2024.

On July 17, 2025, Ahlers announced his retirement from professional football.

== Career statistics ==
=== UFL ===
Year	Team	Games			Passing									Rushing				
Year	Team	GP	GS	Record	Cmp	Att	Pct	Yds	Y/A	Lng	TD	Int	Rtg	Att	Yds	Avg	Lng	TD
2024	ARL	4	0	—	0	0	0.0	0	0.0	0	0	0	0.0	1	−1	−1.0	−1	0
2025	ARL	8	0	—	1	3	33.3	2	0.7	2	1	1	42.4	6	−6	−1.0	4	1
Career		12	0	0–0	1	3	33.3	2	0.7	2	1	1	42.4	7	−7	−1.0	4	1

=== College ===
Year	Team	Games			Passing								Rushing			
Year	Team	GP	GS	Record	Cmp	Att	Pct	Yds	Avg	TD	Int	Rtg	Att	Yds	Avg	TD
2018	East Carolina	10	5	1–4	127	263	48.3	1,785	6.8	12	3	118.1	119	592	5.0	6
2019	East Carolina	12	12	4–8	264	442	59.7	3,387	7.7	21	10	135.3	108	359	3.3	6
2020	East Carolina	8	8	3–5	165	269	61.3	1,927	7.2	18	9	136.9	54	109	2.0	1
2021	East Carolina	12	12	7–5	256	414	61.8	3,126	7.3	18	10	134.8	116	204	1.8	6
2022	East Carolina	13	13	8–5	315	469	67.2	3,708	7.9	28	5	151.1	72	182	2.5	6
Career		55	50	23−27	1,127	1,857	60.7	13,933	7.5	97	37	137.0	469	1,446	3.1	25

=== High school ===
Year	Team	GP	Passing								Rushing			
Year	Team	GP	Cmp	Att	Pct	Yds	Avg	TD	Int	Rtg	Att	Yds	Avg	TD
2014	D. H. Conley	8	31	77	40.3	475	15.3	6	5	60.3	116	600	5.2	12
2015	D. H. Conley	14	132	262	50.4	2,457	18.6	27	10	101.6	168	1,142	6.8	15
2016	D. H. Conley	12	284	460	61.7	4,503	15.9	51	9	123.1	150	911	6.1	15
2017	D. H. Conley	13	223	358	62.3	3,763	16.9	61	4	132.7	109	933	8.6	14
Career		47	670	1,157	57.9	11,198	16.7	145	28	120.2	543	3,586	6.6	56

== Personal life ==
Ahlers is the founder and co-founder of Built When Broken, a Christian-based apparel company that was founded following the unexpected death of his friend in 2017.

== See also ==
- NCAA Division I FBS passing leaders
