= Rod Coleman (American football) =

American football player (born 1976)

No. 91, 57, 75
- Position: Defensive tackle

Personal information
- Born: August 16, 1976 (age 50); Philadelphia, Pennsylvania, U.S.
- Listed height: 6 ft 2 in (1.88 m)
- Listed weight: 297 lb (135 kg)

Career information
- High school: Simon Gratz (Philadelphia)
- College: East Carolina
- NFL draft: 1999: 5th round, 153rd overall pick

Career history
- Oakland Raiders (1999–2003); Atlanta Falcons (2004–2007); New Orleans Saints (2009)*
- * Offseason or practice squad member only

Awards and highlights
- Second-team All-Pro (2005); Pro Bowl (2005)

Career NFL statistics
- Total tackles: 271
- Sacks: 58.5
- Forced fumbles: 11
- Fumble recoveries: 7
- Interceptions: 1
- Defensive touchdowns: 1
- Stats at Pro Football Reference

Roderick Dwayne Coleman (born August 16, 1976) is an American former professional football player who was a defensive tackle for nine seasons in the National Football League (NFL). He played college football for the East Carolina Pirates. He was selected by the Oakland Raiders in the fifth round of the 1999 NFL draft, and has also played for the NFL's Atlanta Falcons and New Orleans Saints.

== Early life ==
Coleman attended Simon Gratz High School in Philadelphia, where he won varsity letters in football and track and field and was an honor student.

== College career ==
Coleman played for the East Carolina Pirates football team while playing for the East Carolina University. He is the school's career, single-season, and single-game leader in sacks.

== Professional career ==
=== Oakland Raiders ===
Coleman played for the Oakland Raiders from 1999 to 2003.

=== Atlanta Falcons ===
Coleman signed with the Atlanta Falcons for the 2004 season and played for them until 2007. On February 15, 2008, the Falcons released him.

=== New Orleans Saints ===
After sitting out the 2008 season recovering from injuries, Coleman was signed by the New Orleans Saints to a one-year contract on March 27, 2009. He was waived on August 31.
