= Junior Smith =

American gridiron football player (born 1973)

No. 1
- Position: Running back

Personal information
- Born: April 18, 1973 (age 53)
- Listed height: 5 ft 7 in (1.70 m)
- Listed weight: 185 lb (84 kg)

Career information
- High school: E. E. Smith (Fayetteville, North Carolina)
- College: East Carolina (1991–1994)

Career history
- 1995: Shreveport Pirates
- 1996: Hamilton Tiger-Cats*
- * Offseason or practice squad member only

Career CFL statistics
- Rushing yards: 246
- Receiving average: 4.5
- Touchdowns: 1

Wardell "Junior" Smith (born April 18, 1973) is an American former football running back. He played college football for the East Carolina Pirates, and professionally for the Shreveport Pirates of the Canadian Football League (CFL).

== Early life ==
Wardell Smith was born on April 18, 1973. He played high school football at E. E. Smith High School in Fayetteville, North Carolina. He rushed for 2,454 yards his senior year in 1990. Smith was not heavily recruited by major schools coming out of high school. He chose to sign with the East Carolina Pirates instead of the Appalachian State Mountaineers so that he could play against bigger colleges.

== College career ==
Smith was a four-year letterman for the East Carolina Pirates of East Carolina University from 1991 to 1994. He rushed for 1,037 yards and nine touchdowns in 1992, 1,352 yards and nine touchdowns in 1993, and 1,204 yards and nine touchdowns in 1994, become the first person in school history to rush for 1,000 yards in three straight seasons. Smith's 278 carries, 1,352 rushing yards, and 290 plays from scrimmage in 1993 were the most among independents that year. His 1,204 rushing yards and 261 plays from scrimmage in 1994 were also the most among independents that season. He was a three-time Football News honorable mention All-America selection and also a three-time All-South Independent honoree. Smith finished his college career with 3,745 rushing yards and 27 rushing touchdowns, and 58 receptions and one receiving touchdown. His 3,745 rushing yards were a school record. He graduated from East Carolina with a bachelor's degree in exercise and sports science in May 1997. Smith was inducted into the ECU Athletics Hall of Fame in 2019.

== Professional career ==
Smith signed with the Shreveport Pirates of the Canadian Football League (CFL) after going undrafted in the 1995 NFL draft. He dressed in 13 games for the Pirates during the 1995 season, recording 55 carries for 246 yards and one touchdown, 13 catches for 107 yards, 15 special teams tackles, one defensive tackle, and three fumble recoveries (one of which he returned for a touchdown). The Pirates folded after the season.

On March 7, 1996, Smith was selected by the Hamilton Tiger-Cats of the CFL in a dispersal draft. However, he was later released.

== Post-playing career ==
Smith was a graduate assistant in ECU's Athletic Student Development Office in 1997. He was the running backs coach for the Illinois State Redbirds from 1998 to 1999, the Army Black Knights from 2000 to 2003, the Louisiana–Monroe Warhawks in 2004, and the East Carolina Pirates from 2005 to 2009.
