= Phat Watts =

American football player (born 1999)

Profile
- Position: Wide receiver

Personal information
- Born: December 23, 1999 (age 26); Chicago, Illinois, U.S.
- Listed height: 6 ft 0 in (1.83 m)
- Listed weight: 190 lb (86 kg)

Career information
- High school: Petal (Petal, Mississippi)
- College: Jones College (2018–2019); Tulane (2020–2024)
- NFL draft: 2025: undrafted

Nataurean "Phat" Watts (born December 23, 1999) is an American former college football wide receiver. He played college football at Tulane and Jones College.

== Early life ==
Watts was born in Chicago, Illinois, but moved to Richton, Mississippi at the age of four. He initially attended Richton High School, where he played football with his twin brother Natorian “Duece” Watts. After their sophomore year, Watts and his brother transferred to Petal High School where they played with future Tulane teammate Stephon Huderson. Over his high school career, Watts played in 46 games and amassed 126 completions and 2046 yards on 273 attempts, 3,222 yards on 471 carries, 1,422 on 106 receptions, and 70 touchdowns.

== College career ==
=== Jones College ===
After graduating high school, Watts began his collegiate career at Jones County Junior College. At Jones, he played with Tulane linebacker Nick Anderson. He played for a total of 20 games across the 2018 and 2019 seasons including a Mississippi Bowl win with future 2-time CFP champion quarterback Stetson Bennett IV. After the 2019 season, Watts was ranked as a 3-star recruit by 247Sports and received Division I offers from Tulane, Liberty, Louisiana-Monroe, South Alabama, and Southern Miss.

=== Tulane ===
Watts committed to play at Tulane University for the 2020 season on June 7, 2019, and signed a letter of intent in December of the same year. Watts would play all 12 games for the next two years before suffering an ACL tear in the second game of the 2022 season, and would take a medical redshirt year. Watts was named to Jim Weber's All-Name College Football Team in 2021 and 2023.

=== College statistics ===
Year	Team	GP	Receiving					Rushing					Returning					Tackles		
Year	Team	GP	Rec	Yds	Avg	Lng	TD	Att	Yds	Avg	Lng	TD	Ret	Yds	Avg	Lng	TD	Solo	Ast	Tot
2018	Jones College	12	16	293	18.3	73	3	2	3	1.5	2	0	1	31	31	31	0	3	1	4
2019	Jones College	8	13	115	8.8	19	0	0	0	0	0	0	4	91	22.8	28	0	0	0	0
2020	Tulane	12	17	217	12.8	38	0	5	19	3.8	14	1	0	0	0	0	0	0	0	0
2021	Tulane	12	18	224	12.4	49	2	0	0	0	0	0	0	0	0	0	0	4	1	5
2021	Tulane	2	1	5	5	5	0	1	5	5	5	0	0	0	0	0	0	0	0	0
2023	Tulane	3	0	0	0	0	0	0	0	0	0	0	0	0	0	0	0	0	0	0
2024	Tulane	8	1	27	27.0	27	0	0	0	0	0	0	0	0	0	0	0	0	0	0
NJCAA Career		20	29	408	14.1	73	3	2	3	1.5	2	0	5	122	24.4	31	0	3	1	4
FBS Career		37	37	473	12.8	49	2	6	24	4.0	14	1	0	0	0	0	0	4	1	5
Career		57	66	881	13.3	73	5	8	27	3.4	14	1	5	122	24.4	31	0	7	2	9

== Professional career ==
After a seven-year college career, Watts declared for the 2025 NFL Draft. He Received interest from many NFL teams including The Tampa Bay Buccaneers and Kansas City Chiefs. Watts later decided to retire from the NFL.
