= 2021 East Carolina Pirates football team =

American college football season

2021 East Carolina Pirates football

Military Bowl, vs. Boston College, Canceled
- Conference: American Athletic Conference
- Record: 7–5 (5–3 The American)
- Head coach: Mike Houston (3rd season)
- Offensive coordinator: Donnie Kirkpatrick (3rd season)
- Offensive scheme: Spread
- Defensive coordinator: Blake Harrell (2nd season)
- Base defense: 3–4 or 4–2–5
- Home stadium: Dowdy–Ficklen Stadium

2021 American Athletic Conference football standings
	Conf.			Overall
Team	W		L	W		L
No. 4 Cincinnati y$^	8	–	0	13	–	1
No. 17 Houston y	8	–	0	12	–	2
UCF	5	–	3	9	–	4
East Carolina	5	–	3	7	–	5
Tulsa	5	–	3	7	–	6
SMU	4	–	4	8	–	4
Memphis	3	–	5	6	–	6
Navy	3	–	5	4	–	8
Tulane	1	–	7	2	–	10
South Florida	1	–	7	2	–	10
Temple	1	–	7	3	–	9
Championship: Cincinnati 35, Houston 20
^ – College Football Playoff participant; $ – Conference champion; y – Championship game participant; Rankings from AP Poll

The 2021 East Carolina Pirates football team represented East Carolina University in the 2021 NCAA Division I FBS football season. The Pirates, led by third-year head coach Mike Houston, play their home games at Dowdy–Ficklen Stadium as members of the American Athletic Conference.

After compiling a 7–5 regular season record, the Pirates received a bid to the Military Bowl, where they were due to face the Boston College Eagles. On December 26, the Eagles withdrew from the game, due to COVID-19 issues; the bowl was subsequently canceled.

== Preseason ==
=== American Athletic Conference preseason media poll ===
The American Athletic Conference preseason media poll was released at the virtual media day held August 4, 2021. Cincinnati, who finished the 2020 season ranked No. 8 nationally, was tabbed as the preseason favorite in the 2021 preseason media poll.

Media poll
Predicted finish	Team	Votes (1st place)
1	Cincinnati	262 (22)
2	UCF	241 (2)
3	SMU	188
4	Houston	181
5	Memphis	168
6	Tulsa	153
7	Tulane	132
т-8	East Carolina	85
т-8	Navy	85
10	Temple	46
11	South Florida	43

== Schedule ==
Date	Time	Opponent	Site	TV	Result	Attendance
September 2	7:30 p.m.	vs. Appalachian State*	Bank of America Stadium; Charlotte, NC (Duke's Mayo Classic)	ESPNU	L 19–33	36,752
September 11	12:00 p.m.	South Carolina*	Dowdy–Ficklen Stadium; Greenville, NC	ESPN2	L 17–20	40,816
September 18	6:00 p.m.	at Marshall*	Joan C. Edwards Stadium; Huntington, WV (rivalry)	CBSSN Facebook	W 42–38	24,833
September 25	6:00 p.m.	Charleston Southern*	Dowdy–Ficklen Stadium; Greenville, NC	ESPN+	W 31–28	39,218
October 2	3:30 p.m.	Tulane^{†}	Dowdy–Ficklen Stadium; Greenville, NC	ESPN+	W 52–29	33,475
October 9	6:00 p.m.	at UCF	Bounce House; Orlando, FL	ESPN+	L 16–20	41,649
October 23	9:20 p.m.	at Houston	TDECU Stadium; Houston, TX	ESPNews ^{α}	L 24–31 ^{OT}	22,925
October 28	7:30 p.m.	South Florida	Dowdy–Ficklen Stadium; Greenville, NC	ESPN	W 29–14	32,015
November 6	3:00 p.m.	Temple	Dowdy–Ficklen Stadium; Greenville, NC	ESPN+	W 45–3	32,817
November 13	11:00 a.m.	at Memphis	Liberty Bowl Memorial Stadium; Memphis, TN	ESPN+	W 30–29 ^{OT}	28,431
November 20	3:30 p.m.	at Navy	Navy–Marine Corps Memorial Stadium; Annapolis, MD	CBSSN	W 38–35	28,001
November 26	3:30 p.m.	No. 4 Cincinnati	Dowdy–Ficklen Stadium; Greenville, NC	ABC	L 13–35	38,014
~~December 27~~	~~2:30 p.m.~~	vs. ~~Boston College~~*	~~Navy–Marine Corps Memorial Stadium~~; ~~Annapolis, MD~~ (~~Military Bowl~~)	~~ESPN~~	Canceled	_
*Non-conference game; ^{†}Homecoming; Rankings from AP Poll and CFP Rankings after November 24 released prior to game; All times are in Eastern time

== Notes ==
^α This game was initially scheduled for ESPNU at 4PM ET, but moved to 9:20PM ET on ESPNews because of a rain delay.

== Game summaries ==
=== Vs. Appalachian State ===
Appalachian State vs. East Carolina

Team	1	2	3	4	Total
• Mountaineers	14	6	7	6	33
Pirates	6	0	3	10	19

- Date: September 2, 2021
- Location: Bank of America Stadium
  Charlotte, NC
- Game start: 7:33 p.m. EDT
- Elapsed time: 3 hours and 23 minutes
- Game attendance: 36,752
- Game weather: 77 °F (25 °C) • Weather: Clear • Wind: S 8 MPH
- TV announcers (ESPNU): Mike Couzens (play-by-play) and Dustin Fox (analyst)

Scoring summary
1	09:26	ECU	Keaton Mitchell 63-yard pass from Holton Ahlers (Owen Daffer kick failed) (5 plays, 80 yards, 3:02)	ECU 0–6
1	06:24	APP	Thomas Hennigan 34-yard pass from Chase Brice (Chandler Staton kick) (7 plays, 66 yards, 3:02)	APP 7–6
1	00:50	APP	Camerun Peoples 21-yard rush (Chandler Staton kick) (9 plays, 78 yards, 4:27)	APP 14–6
2	09:13	APP	Chandler Staton 21-yard field goal (11 plays, 80 yards, 4:11)	APP 17–6
2	02:29	APP	Chandler Staton 43-yard field goal (11 plays, 51 yards, 5:06)	APP 20–6
3	08:53	ECU	Owen Daffer 38-yard field goal (10 plays, 66 yards, 4:03)	APP 20–9
3	08:19	APP	Corey Sutton 18-yard pass from Chase Brice (Chandler Staton kick) (2 plays, 86 yards, 0:34)	APP 27–9
4	12:19	APP	Camerun Peoples 12-yard rush (two-point conversion rush attempt failed) (3 plays, 60 yards, 1:29)	APP 33–9
4	06:25	ECU	Owen Daffer 39-yard field goal (11 plays, 59 yards, 4:50)	APP 33–12
4	02:10	ECU	Ryan Jones 38-yard pass from Holton Ahlers (Owen Daffer kick) (6 plays, 76 yards, 1:54)	APP 33–19

Statistics	Appalachian State	East Carolina
First downs	25	20
Total yards	485	381
Rushing yards	226	86
Passing yards	259	295
Turnovers	1	2
Time of possession	31:55	28:05

Team	Category	Player	Statistics
Appalachian State	Passing	Chase Brice	20/27, 259 yards, 2 TDs, 1 INT
Appalachian State	Rushing	Nate Noel	15 carries, 126 yards
Appalachian State	Receiving	Thomas Hennigan	4 receptions, 114 yards, 1 TD
East Carolina	Passing	Holton Ahlers	22/40, 295 yards, 2 TDs, 1 INT
East Carolina	Rushing	Keaton Mitchell	4 carries, 50 yards
East Carolina	Receiving	Keaton Mitchell	5 receptions, 79 yards, 1 TD

=== Vs. South Carolina ===
Game Two – South Carolina Gamecocks (1–0) at East Carolina Pirates (0-1)

Quarter	1	2	3	4	Total
South Carolina	0	7	7	6	20
East Carolina	7	7	0	3	17

at Dowdy-Ficklen Stadium • Greenville, North Carolina

- Date: Saturday, September 11, 2021
- Game time: 12:00 p.m. EST
- Game weather: Sunny • Temperature - 78 °F (26 °C)
- Game attendance: 40,816
- Referee: Alex Moore
- TV announcers (ESPN2): Brian Custer (play-by-play), Kelly Stouffer (color), and Lauren Sisler (sideline)
- Box Score

Game information

First quarter

- (14:49) ECU – Jsi Hatfield 75-yard pass from Tyler Snead (Owen Daffer Kick). East Carolina 7-0. Drive: 1 play, 75 yards, 0:11.

Second quarter

- (11:53) ECU – Holton Ahlers 3-yard run (Owen Daffer Kick). East Carolina 14-0. Drive: 2 plays, 13 yards, 0:45.
- (1:00) SC – Damani Staley 63-yard interception return (Parker White Kick). East Carolina 14-7.

Third quarter

- (0:46) SC – Dakereon Joyner 13-yard pass from Zeb Noland (Parker White Kick). Tied 14-14. Drive: 5 plays, 72 yards, 1:14.

Fourth quarter

- (8:46) ECU – Owen Daffer 26-yard field goal. East Carolina 17-14. Drive: 14 plays, 67 yards, 7:00.
- (6:46) SC – Parker White 39-yard field goal. Tied 17-17. Drive: 5 plays, 12 yards, 2:00.
- (0:00) SC – Parker White 36-yard field goal. South Carolina 20-17. Drive: 10 plays, 54 yards, 4:54.

Statistics	SC	ECU
First downs	15	12
Plays–yards	63–325	63–268
Rushes–yards	100	116
Passing yards	225	152
Passing: comp–att–int	13–24–1	12–25–2
Time of possession	18:57	41:03

Team	Category	Player	Statistics
SC	Passing	Zeb Noland	13/24, 225 yards, 1 TD, 1 INT
SC	Rushing	JuJu McDowell	11 carries, 71 yards
SC	Receiving	Josh Vann	5 receptions, 127 yards
ECU	Passing	Holton Ahlers	11/24, 77 yards, 2 INT
ECU	Rushing	Rahjai Harris	14 carries, 70 yards
ECU	Receiving	Jsi Hatfield	2 receptions, 90 yards, 1 TD

=== At Marshall ===
East Carolina at Marshall

Team	1	2	3	4	Total
• Pirates	7	14	0	21	42
Thundering Herd	10	14	14	0	38

- Date: September 18, 2021
- Location: Joan C. Edwards Stadium
  Huntington, WV
- Game start: 6:05 p.m. EDT
- Elapsed time: 3 hours and 36 minutes
- Game attendance: 24,833
- Game weather: 85 °F (29 °C) • Weather: Sunny
- Referee: Luke Richard
- TV announcers (CBS Sports Network): Michael Grady (play–by–play), Corey Chavous (analyst), and Justin Walters (sideline reporter)

Scoring summary
1	12:20	MRSH	Andrew Sanders 29-yard field goal (9 plays, 63 yards, 2:40)	MRSH 3–0
1	09:13	ECU	Tyler Snead 24-yard pass from Holton Ahlers (Owen Daffer kick) (8 plays, 75 yards, 3:07)	ECU 7–3
1	05:20	MRSH	Willie Johnson 19-yard pass from Grant Wells (Andrew Sanders kick) (6 plays, 37 yards, 1:42)	MRSH 10–7
2	12:23	ECU	Keaton Mitchell 88-yard rush (Owen Daffer kick) (3 plays, 96 yards, 1:24)	ECU 14–10
2	10:28	MRSH	Rasheen Ali 26-yard rush (Andrew Sanders kick) (5 plays, 75 yards, 2:05)	MRSH 17–14
2	07:31	MRSH	Rasheen Ali 1-yard rush (Andrew Sanders kick) (4 plays, 65 yards, 1:21)	MRSH 24–14
2	00:08	ECU	Shane Calhoun 5-yard pass from Holton Ahlers (Owen Daffer kick) (13 plays, 53 yards, 3:25)	MRSH 24–21
3	10:23	MRSH	Rasheen Ali 49-yard rush (Andrew Sanders kick) (4 plays, 63 yards, 1:34)	MRSH 31–21
3	01:03	MRSH	Grant Wells 6-yard rush (Andrew Sanders kick) (6 plays, 90 yards, 2:00)	MRSH 38–21
4	07:31	ECU	Holton Ahlers 5-yard rush (Owen Daffer kick) (12 plays, 78 yards, 4:33)	MRSH 38–28
4	02:31	ECU	Holton Ahlers 27-yard pass from Tyler Snead (Owen Daffer kick) (6 plays, 80 yards, 2:16)	MRSH 38–35
4	00:55	ECU	Rahjai Harris 1-yard rush (Owen Daffer kick) (6 plays, 53 yards, 1:36)	ECU 42–38

Statistics	East Carolina	Marshall
First downs	27	24
Total yards	563	648
Rushing yards	168	215
Passing yards	395	433
Turnovers	1	3
Time of possession	30:19	29:41

Team	Category	Player	Statistics
East Carolina	Passing	Holton Ahlers	30/48, 368 yards, 2 TDs
East Carolina	Rushing	Keaton Mitchell	14 carries, 135 yards, 1 TD
East Carolina	Receiving	Shane Calhoun	8 receptions, 114 yards, 1 TD
Marshall	Passing	Grant Wells	24/39, 433 yards, 1 TD, 2 INTs
Marshall	Rushing	Rasheen Ali	24 carries, 189 yards, 3 TDs
Marshall	Receiving	Corey Gammage	8 receptions, 180 yards

=== Charleston Southern ===
Charleston Southern at East Carolina

Team	1	2	3	4	Total
Buccaneers	14	0	0	14	28
• Pirates	0	24	7	0	31

- Date: September 25, 2021
- Location: Dowdy–Ficklen Stadium
  Greenville, NC
- Game start: 6:05 p.m. EDT
- Elapsed time: 4 hours and 33 minutes
- Game attendance: 39,218
- Game weather: 75 °F (24 °C) • Weather: Sunny
- Referee: Edwin Lee
- TV announcers (ESPN+): Connor Onion (play–by–play) and Stanford Routt (analyst)

Scoring summary
1	10:29	CHSO	JD Moore 6-yard rush (Sam Babbush kick) (15 plays, 75 yards, 4:31)	CHSO 7–0
1	06:18	CHSO	Kale Anderson 38-yard pass from Jack Chambers (Sam Babbush kick) (8 plays, 98 yards, 2:17)	CHSO 14–0
2	13:10	ECU	Keaton Mitchell 74-yard rush (Owen Daffer kick) (2 plays, 80 yards, 0:33)	CHSO 14–7
2	07:38	ECU	Owen Daffer 33-yard field goal (11 plays, 39 yards, 3:59)	CHSO 14–10
2	05:00	ECU	Mason Garcia 3-yard rush (Owen Daffer kick) (5 plays, 55 yards, 1:56)	ECU 17–14
2	02:31	ECU	C. J. Johnson 60-yard pass from Holton Ahlers (Owen Daffer kick) (3 plays, 66 yards, 0:39)	ECU 24–14
3	11:09	ECU	Ja'Quan McMillian 23-yard interception returned (Owen Daffer kick) (3 plays, 12 yards, 0:49)	ECU 31–14
4	13:58	CHSO	Jack Chambers 8-yard rush (Sam Babbush kick) (10 plays, 81 yards, 1:59)	ECU 31–21
4	01:50	CHSO	Geoffrey Wall 2-yard pass from Jack Chambers (Sam Babbush kick) (8 plays, 86 yards, 1:21)	ECU 31–28

Statistics	Charleston Southern	East Carolina
First downs	34	14
Total yards	536	388
Rushing yards	131	150
Passing yards	405	238
Turnovers	1	2
Time of possession	31:27	28:33

Team	Category	Player	Statistics
Charleston Southern	Passing	Jack Chambers	38/61, 405 yds, 2 TD, 1 INT
Charleston Southern	Rushing	JD Moore	14 car, 58 yds, 1 TD
Charleston Southern	Receiving	Garris Schwarting	8 rec, 94 yds
East Carolina	Passing	Holton Ahlers	17/26, 238 yds, 1 TD, 2 INT
East Carolina	Rushing	Keaton Mitchell	13 car, 125 yds, 1 TD
East Carolina	Receiving	C. J. Johnson	3 rec, 95 yds, 1 TD

=== Tulane ===
Tulane at East Carolina

Team	1	2	3	4	Total
Green Wave	0	7	16	6	29
• Pirates	17	14	0	21	52

- Date: October 2, 2021
- Location: Dowdy–Ficklen Stadium
  Greenville, NC
- Game start: 3:30 p.m. EDT
- Elapsed time:
- Game attendance: 33,475
- Game weather: • Weather: TBD • Wind: TBD
- Referee:
- TV announcers (ESPN+): Mark Neely (play-by-play) and Barrett Brooks (analyst)

Scoring summary
1	10:49	ECU	Owen Daffer 23-yard field goal (10 plays, 70 yards, 4:11)	ECU 3–0
1	5:03	ECU	Holton Ahlers 17-yard run (Owen Daffer kick) (7 plays, 55 yards, 3:55)	ECU 10–0
1	1:21	ECU	Keaton Mitchell 68-yard run (Owen Daffer kick) (2 plays, 80 yards, 0:40)	ECU 17–0
2	13:18	ECU	Tyler Snead 53-yard pass from Holton Ahlers (Owen Daffer kick) (4 plays, 61 yards, 1:28)	ECU 24–0
2	9:38	TUL	Ygenio Booker 16-yard pass from Michael Pratt (Merek Glover kick) (10 plays, 75 yards, 3:40)	ECU 24–7
2	0:36	ECU	Rahjai Harris 3-yard pass from Holton Ahlers (Owen Daffer kick) (11 plays, 76 yards, 3:27)	ECU 31–7
3	10:43	TUL	Michael Pratt 7-yard run (Michael Pratt pass to Tyrick James for two-point conversion) (7 plays, 75 yards, 4:17)	ECU 31–15
3	3:39	TUL	Cameron Carroll 1-yard run (Michael Pratt run for two-point conversion) (10 plays, 91 yards, 3:22)	ECU 31–23
4	13:33	ECU	Rahjai Harris 1-yard run (Owen Daffer kick) (10 plays, 75 yards, 5:06)	ECU 38–23
4	8:15	ECU	Ryan Jones 14-yards pass from Mason Garcia (Owen Daffer kick) (7 plays, 30 yards, 3:51)	ECU 45–23
4	6:53	TUL	Michael Pratt 2-yard run (two-point run conversion failed) (4 plays, 75 yards, 1:22)	ECU 45–29
4	1:06	ECU	Keaton Mitchell 30-yard run 3 plays, 61 yards, 1:34)	ECU 52–29

Statistics	Tulane	East Carolina
First downs	19	25
Total yards	404	612
Rushing yards	124	310
Passing yards	280	302
Turnovers	4	0
Time of possession	25:41	34:19

Team	Category	Player	Statistics
Tulane	Passing	Michael Pratt	22/36, 268 yds, 1 TD, 3 INT
Tulane	Rushing	Cameron Carroll	9 car, 80 yds, 1 TD
Tulane	Receiving	Duece Watts	4 rec, 79 yds
East Carolina	Passing	Holton Ahlers	21/32, 288 yds, 2 TD
East Carolina	Rushing	Keaton Mitchell	15 car, 222 yds, 2 TD
East Carolina	Receiving	Tyler Snead	4 rec, 78 yds, 1 TD

=== At UCF ===
East Carolina at Central Florida

Team	1	2	3	4	Total
Pirates	0	3	10	3	16
• Knights	0	3	7	10	20

- Date: October 9, 2021
- Location: Bounce House
  Orlando, FL
- Game start: 6:04 p.m. EDT
- Elapsed time: 3 hours and 20 minutes
- Game attendance: 41,649
- Game weather: 84 °F (29 °C) • Weather: Sunny • Wind: N 9 MPH
- Referee: Nate Black
- TV announcers (ESPN+): Courtney Lyle (play-by-play) and Brandon Weeden (analyst)

Scoring summary
2	14:57	UCF	Daniel Obarski 35-yard field goal (12 plays, 62 yards, 5:09)	UCF 3–0
2	10:25	ECU	Owen Daffer 29-yard field goal (10 plays, 64 yards, 4:32)	TIED 3–3
3	10:34	ECU	Owen Daffer 23-yard field goal (6 plays, 23 yards, 2:57)	ECU 6–3
3	7:59	UCF	Johnny Richardson 4-yard run (Daniel Obarski kick) (7 plays, 75 yards, 2:35)	UCF 10–6
3	2:43	ECU	Audie Omotosho 27-yard pass from Holton Ahlers (Owen Daffer kick) (5 plays, 53 yards, 2:43)	ECU 13–10
4	7:01	ECU	Owen Daffer 34-yard field goal (16 plays, 66 yards, 8:16)	ECU 16–10
4	5:06	UCF	Daniel Obarski 40-yard field goal (6 plays, 53 yards, 1:55)	ECU 16–13
4	0:23	UCF	Mark-Antony Richards 1-yard run (Daniel Obarski kick) (11 plays, 64 yards, 3:16)	UCF 20–16

Statistics	East Carolina	UCF
First downs	21	16
Total yards	360	359
Rushing yards	141	165
Passing yards	219	194
Turnovers	3	1
Time of possession	32:42	27:18

Team	Category	Player	Statistics
East Carolina	Passing	Holton Ahlers	20/32, 219 yards, TD, INT
East Carolina	Rushing	Rahjai Harris	13 carries, 73 yards
East Carolina	Receiving	Tyler Snead	6 receptions, 82 yards
UCF	Passing	Mikey Keene	23/35, 194 yards, INT
UCF	Rushing	Johnny Richardson	16 carries, 104 yards, TD
UCF	Receiving	Ryan O'Keefe	10 receptions, 73 yards

=== At Houston ===
East Carolina at Houston

Team	1	2	3	4	OT	Total
Pirates	10	0	0	14	0	24
• Cougars	17	7	0	0	7	31

- Date: October 23, 2021
- Location: TDECU Stadium
  Houston, TX
- Game start: 4:00 p.m. EDT (Kicked at 9:20 p.m. – delayed 5 hours and 20 minutes to kickoff due to lightning)
- Elapsed time: 3 hours and 27 minutes
- Game attendance: 22,925
- Game weather: 71 °F (22 °C) • Weather: Cloudy • Wind: SE 9 MPH
- Referee: Edwin Lee
- TV announcers (ESPNews): Kevin Brown (play-by-play) and Hutson Mason (analyst)

Scoring summary
1	11:39	ECU	Owen Daffer 33-yard field goal (9 plays, 60 yards, 3:21)	ECU 3–0
1	6:56	HOU	Dalton Witherspoon 21-yard field goal (11 plays, 70 yards, 4:43)	TIE 3–3
1	5:46	ECU	Jsi Hatfield 40-yard pass from Holton Ahlers (Owen Daffer kick) (3 plays, 78 yards, 1:10)	ECU 10–3
1	5:34	HOU	Marcus Jones 98-yard kickoff return (Dalton Witherspoon kick) (0 plays, 0 yards, 0:12)	TIE 10–10
1	1:38	HOU	Christian Trahan 2-yard pass from Clayton Tune (Dalton Witherspoon kick) (5 plays, 32 yards, 2:47)	HOU 17–10
2	3:12	HOU	Nathaniel Dell 14-yard pass from Clayton Tune (Dalton Witherspoon kick) (2 plays, 13 yards, 0:22)	HOU 24–10
4	6:59	ECU	Holton Ahlers 1-yard run (Owen Daffer kick) (6 plays, 71 yards, 2:40)	HOU 24–17
4	5:43	ECU	Audie Omotosho 13-yard pass from Holton Ahlers (Owen Daffer kick) (2 plays, 16 yards, 1:01)	TIE 24–24
OT		HOU	Alton McCaskill 25-yard run (Dalton Witherspoon kick) (1 play, 25 yards)	HOU 31–24

Statistics	East Carolina	Houston
First downs	20	16
Total yards	360	256
Rushing yards	82	87
Passing yards	278	169
Turnovers	3	1
Time of possession	29:13	30:47

Team	Category	Player	Statistics
East Carolina	Passing	Holton Ahlers	23/37, 278 yards, 2 TDs
East Carolina	Rushing	Keaton Mitchell	11 rushes, 38 yards
East Carolina	Receiving	Tyler Snead	7 receptions, 114 yards
Houston	Passing	Clayton Tune	19/29, 169 yards, 2 TDs
Houston	Rushing	Alton McCaskill	12 rushes, 60 yards, 1 TD
Houston	Receiving	Christian Trahan	6 receptions, 68 yards, 1 TD

=== South Florida ===
South Florida at East Carolina

Team	1	2	3	4	Total
Bulls	0	14	0	0	14
• Pirates	0	6	13	10	29

- Date: October 28, 2021
- Location: Dowdy–Ficklen Stadium
  Greenville, NC
- Game start: 7:35 p.m. EDT
- Elapsed time: 3 hours and 26 minutes
- Game attendance: 32,015
- Game weather: 64 °F (18 °C) • Weather: Cloudy • Wind: E 8 MPH
- Referee: Hank Johns
- TV announcers (ESPN): Matt Barrie (play-by-play), Roddy Jones (analyst), and Lauren Sisler (sideline)

Scoring summary
2	14:55	ECU	Rahjai Harris 13-yard run (14 plays, 83 yards, 6:45)	ECU 6–0
2	8:43	USF	Jaren Mangham 24-yard (Spencer Shrader kick) (6 plays, 87 yards, 2:45)	USF 7–6
2	8:12	USF	Xavier Weaver 13-yard pass from Katravis Marsh (Spencer Shrader kick) (3 plays, 25 yards, 0:25)	USF 14–6
3	10:30	ECU	Audie Omotosho 17-yard pass from Holton Ahlers (Owen Daffer kick) (11 plays, 57 yards, 4:22)	USF 14–13
3	2:38	ECU	Malik Fleming 31-yard interception	ECU 19–14
4	10:26	ECU	Keaton Mitchell 25-yard run (Owen Daffer kick) (10 plays, 80 yards, 4:34)	ECU 26–14
4	5:23	ECU	Owen Daffer 37-yard field goal (6 plays, 13 yards, 2:20)	ECU 29–14

Statistics	South Florida	East Carolina
First downs	19	30
Total yards	391	471
Rushing yards	199	251
Passing yards	192	220
Turnovers	4	3
Time of possession	21:38	38:22

Team	Category	Player	Statistics
South Florida	Passing	Katravis Marsh	15/30, 192 yards, TD, 3 INT
South Florida	Rushing	Kelley Joiner	12 carries, 103 yards
South Florida	Receiving	Xavier Weaver	5 receptions, 91 yards, TD
East Carolina	Passing	Holton Ahlers	21/35, 220 yards, TD
East Carolina	Rushing	Rahjai Harris	22 carries, 100 yards, TD
East Carolina	Receiving	C. J. Johnson	5 receptions, 84 yards

=== Temple ===
Temple at East Carolina

Team	1	2	Total
Owls			0
Pirates			0

- Date: November 6, 2021
- Location: Dowdy–Ficklen Stadium
  Greenville, NC
- Game start: TBD EDT
- Elapsed time:
- Game attendance:
- Game weather: • Weather: TBD • Wind: TBD
- Referee:
- TV announcers (ESPN+): Courtney Lyle (play-by-play) and Brandon Weeden (analyst)

Scoring summary
1
2
3
4

Over/under

Statistics	Temple	East Carolina
First downs		
Total yards		
Rushing yards		
Passing yards		
Turnovers		
Time of possession		

Team	Category	Player	Statistics
Temple	Passing		
Temple	Rushing		
Temple	Receiving		
East Carolina	Passing		
East Carolina	Rushing		
East Carolina	Receiving		

=== At Memphis ===
East Carolina at Memphis

Team	1	2	3	4	OT	Total
• Pirates	7	9	0	7	7	30
Tigers	7	6	7	3	6	29

- Date: November 13, 2021
- Location: Liberty Bowl Memorial Stadium
  Memphis, TN
- Game start: 12:05 EST
- Elapsed time: 3 hours and 12 minutes
- Game attendance: 28,431
- Game weather: 45 °F (7 °C) • Weather: Sunny • Wind: NW 7 MPH
- Referee: Charl Lamertina
- TV announcers (ESPN+): Richard Cross (play-by-play) and Brandon Weeden (analyst)

Scoring summary
1	9:03	MEM	Asa Martin 31-yard pass from Seth Henigan (David Kemp kick) (3 plays, 33 yards, 1:25)	MEM 7–0
1	3:50	ECU	Holton Ahlers 2-yard run (Owen Daffer kick) (12 plays, 75 yards, 5:13)	TIED 7–7
2	13:16	ECU	Owen Daffner 24-yard field goal (9 plays, 65 yards, 3:06)	ECU 10–7
2	3:04	ECU	Owen Daffner 29-yard field goal (19 plays, 65 yards, 8:09)	ECU 13–7
2	2:48	MEM	Eddie Lewis 75-yard pass from Seth Henigan (David Kemp kick failed) (2 plays, 75 yards, 0:16)	MEM 13–13
2	0:09	ECU	Owen Daffner 21-yard field goal (13 plays, 72 yards, 2:39)	ECU 16–13
3	2:48	MEM	Sean Dykes 2-yard pass from Seth Henigan (David Kemp kick) (8 plays, 80 yards, 2:30)	MEM 20–16
4	1:29	ECU	Rahjai Harris 1-yard run (Owen Daffer kick) (16 plays, 75 yards, 6:57)	ECU 23–20
4	0:00	MEM	David Kemp 24-yard field goal (15 plays, 69 yards, 1:29)	TIED 23–23
OT		ECU	Keaton Mitchell 24-yard run (Owen Daffer kick) (2 plays, 25 yards, 0:00)	ECU 30–23
OT		MEM	Rodrigues Clark 20-yard run (Calvin Austin III pass failed) (2 plays, 25 yards, 15:00)	ECU 30–23

Statistics	East Carolina	Memphis
First downs	32	16
Total yards	502	341
Rushing yards	185	108
Passing yards	317	233
Turnovers	2	1
Time of possession	42:47	32:13

Team	Category	Player	Statistics
East Carolina	Passing	Holton Ahlers	29/46, 317 yards, 2 INT
East Carolina	Rushing	Keaton Mitchell	17 carries, 81 yards, TD
East Carolina	Receiving	Tyler Snead	13 receptions, 113 yards
Memphis	Passing	Seth Henigan	15/26, 233 yards, 3 TD, INT
Memphis	Rushing	Seth Henigan	12 carries, 61 yards
Memphis	Receiving	Eddie Lewis	3 receptions, 93 yards, TD

=== At Navy ===
East Carolina at Navy

Team	1	2	3	4	Total
• Pirates	14	10	0	14	38
Midshipmen	7	14	0	14	35

- Date: November 20, 2021
- Location: Navy–Marine Corps Memorial Stadium
  Annapolis, MD
- Game start: 3:30 p.m. EST
- Elapsed time: 3 hours, 10 minutes
- Game attendance: 28,001
- Game weather: 47 °F (8 °C) • Weather: Chilly, clear skies • Wind: S 10–25 MPH
- Referee: Luke Richmond
- TV announcers (CBSSN): John Sadak (play-by-play), Randy Cross (analyst), and Sheehan Stanwick Burch (sideline)

Scoring summary
1	12:14	ECU	Keaton Mitchell 10–yard run (Owen Daffer kick) (6 plays, 75 yards, 2:46)	ECU 7–0
1	2:46	NAVY	Mychal Copper 4–yard pass from Tai Lavatai (Bijan Nichols kick) (10 plays, 78 yards, 5:13)	TIE 7–7
1	2:58	ECU	Tyler Snead 40–yard pass from Holton Ahlers (Owen Daffer kick) (7 plays, 78 yards, 4:03)	ECU 14–7
2	11:13	NAVY	Chance Warren 4–yard pass from Tai Lavatai (Bijan Nichols kick) (11 plays, 75 yards, 6:45)	TIE 14–14
2	5:29	ECU	Owen Daffer 37–yard field goal (12 plays, 58 yards, 4:44)	ECU 17–14
2	2:11	NAVY	Isaac Ruoss 19–yard run (Bijan Nichols kick) (7 plays, 70 yards, 3:18)	NAVY 21–17
2	0:18	ECU	Ryan Jones 5–yard pass from Holton Ahlers (Owen Daffer kick) (7 plays, 85 yards, 1:53)	ECU 24–22
3			No scoring plays.
4	14:03	NAVY	Carlinos Acie 90-yard run (Bijan Nichols kick) (1 plays, 90 yards, 0:13)	NAVY 28–24
4	8:47	ECU	Owen Daffer 25–yard field goal (11 plays, 58 yards, 5:16)	NAVY 28–27
4	8:33	NAVY	Maquel Haywood 98–yard kickoff return (Bijan Nichols kick) (0 plays, 0 yards, 0:00)	NAVY 35–27
4	5:01	ECU	Tyler Snead 28–yard pass from Holton Ahlers (Holton Ahlers pass to C.J. Johnson for Two-Point Conversion) (7 plays, 70 yards, 3:32)	TIE 35–35
4	0:00	ECU	Owen Daffer 54–yard field goal (4 plays, 44 yards, 1:11)	ECU 38–35

Statistics	East Carolina	Navy
First downs	24	17
Total yards	563	382
Rushing yards	158	345
Passing yards	405	37
Turnovers	0	0
Time of possession	32:40	27:20

Team	Category	Player	Statistics
East Carolina	Passing	Holton Ahlers	27/32, 405 yards, 3 TD
East Carolina	Rushing	Keaton Mitchell	18 carries, 94 yards, TD
East Carolina	Receiving	Tyler Snead	5 receptions, 137 yards, 2 TD
Navy	Passing	Tai Lavatai	4/4, 37 yards, 2 TD
Navy	Rushing	Carlinos Acie	6 carries, 155 yards, TD
Navy	Receiving	Mychal Copper	2 receptions, 31 yards, TD

=== No. 4 Cincinnati ===
Cincinnati at East Carolina

Team	1	2	3	4	Total
• No. 4 Bearcats	0	21	0	14	35
Pirates	3	0	3	7	13

- Date: November 26, 2021
- Location: Dowdy–Ficklen Stadium
  Greenville, NC
- Game start: 3:50 p.m. EST
- Elapsed time: 3 hours and 23 minutes
- Game attendance: 38,014
- Game weather: 55 °F (13 °C) • Weather: Sunny • Wind: NW 20 MPH
- Referee: Hank Johns
- TV announcers (ABC): Jason Benetti (play-by-play), Andre Ware (analyst), and Paul Carcaterra (sideline)

Scoring summary
1	5:29	ECU	Owen Daffer 35-yard field goal (12 plays, 56 yards, 4:37)	ECU 0–3
2	13:48	CIN	Leonard Taylor 44-yard pass from Desmond Ridder (Christian Lowery kick) (5 plays, 76 yards, 1:31)	CIN 7–3
2	10:32	CIN	Jerome Ford 2-yard run (Christian Lowery kick) (3 plays, 58 yards, 1:09)	CIN 14–3
2	4:40	CIN	Alec Pierce 28-yard pass from Desmond Ridder (Christian Lowery kick) (7 plays, 88 yards, 3:19)	CIN 21–3
3	2:18	ECU	Owen Daffer 44-yard field goal (11 plays, 51 yards, 5:58)	CIN 21–6
4	11:17	CIN	Sauce Gardner 60-yard return of blocked field goal (Christian Lowery kick) (9 plays, 30 yards, 4:04)	CIN 28–6
4	9:38	ECU	Jai Hatfield 12-yard pass from Holton Ahlers (Owen Daffer kick) (5 plays, 75 yards, 1:39)	CIN 28–13
4	1:44	CIN	Ryan Montgomery 2-yard run (Christian Lowery kick) (5 plays, 39 yards, 1:35)	CIN 35–13

Statistics	Cincinnati	East Carolina
First downs	20	19
Total yards	444	282
Rushing yards	143	54
Passing yards	301	228
Time of possession	27:42	32:18

Team	Category	Player	Statistics
Cincinnati	Passing	Desmond Ridder	17/28, 301 yards, 2 TD, 2 INT
Cincinnati	Rushing	Jerome Ford	20 carries, 85 yards, 1 TD
Cincinnati	Receiving	Alec Pierce	8 receptions, 136 yards, 1 TD
ECU	Passing	Holton Ahlers	19/38, 228 yards, 1 TD, 1 INT
ECU	Rushing	Keaton Mitchell	17 carries, 55 yards
ECU	Receiving	Tyler Snead	6 receptions, 91 yards
