= Nick Anderson (gridiron football) =

American gridiron football player (born 2000)

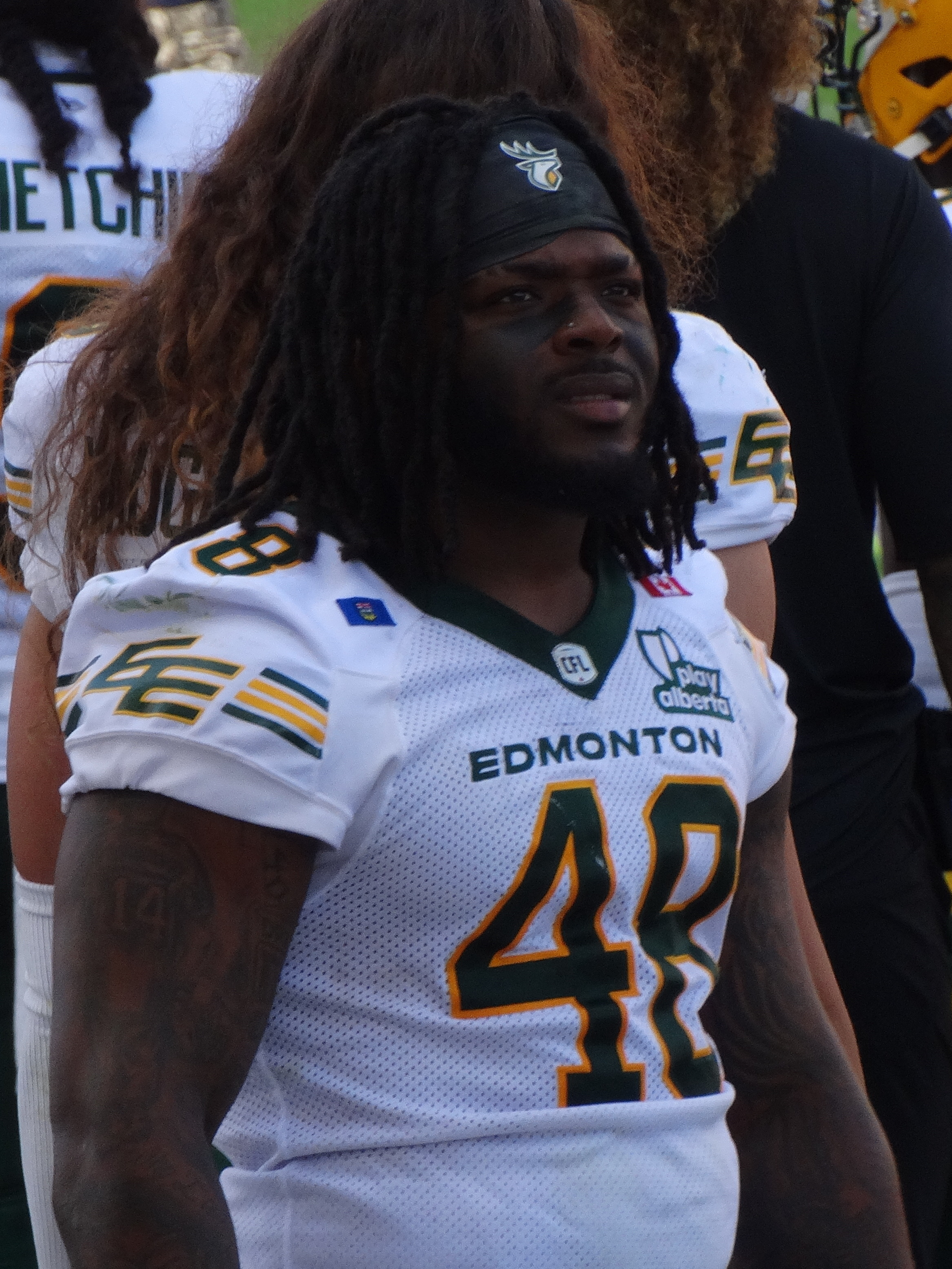
- Anderson with the Edmonton Elks in 2025

No. 48 – Edmonton Elks
- Position: Linebacker
- Roster status: Active
- CFL status: American

Personal information
- Born: January 27, 2000 (age 26); Vicksburg, Mississippi, U.S.
- Listed height: 5 ft 11 in (1.80 m)
- Listed weight: 230 lb (104 kg)

Career information
- High school: Vicksburg
- College: Jones (2018); Tulane (2019–2022)
- NFL draft: 2023: undrafted

Career history
- New Orleans Saints (2023)*; Edmonton Elks (2024–present)
- * Offseason or practice squad member only

Awards and highlights
- Grey Cup champion (2026); CFL Most Outstanding Rookie (2024); Jackie Parker Trophy (2024); CFL All-Star (2024); CFL West All-Star (2024); Second-team All-AAC (2022)

Career CFL statistics as of 2026
- Total tackles: 224
- Sacks: 5.0
- Forced fumbles: 2
- Pass knockdowns: 10
- Interceptions: 3
- Stats at CFL.ca
- Stats at Pro Football Reference

Nicholas Anderson (born January 27, 2000) is an American professional football linebacker for the Edmonton Elks of the Canadian Football League (CFL). He played college football for the Tulane Green Wave.

== Early life ==
Anderson was born prematurely on January 27, 2000, and grew up in Vickburg Mississippi. He played football at Vicksburg High School and played as both a linebacker and running back. Throughout, elementary through high school Anderson maintained a perfect 4.0 GPA and made nothing less than an A grade in all his courses. During his sophomore season, his mother prevented him from attending spring practices due to earning a B grade. While playing at Vicksburg he was named 2015-2016 Team Rookie of the Year, 2016-2017 1st Team All District Linebacker, and All County Defensive Player of the Year. During high school, he amassed 172 total tackles, 8 sacks, 1 interception, and 2 fumble recoveries. Anderson left high school as a two-star recruit and received offers from Alcorn State, Central Arkansas, and Prairie View A&M. Despite having these offers he instead chose to attend Jones County Junior College in an attempt to attract the attention of a Division I team.

== College career ==
While at Jones College, Anderson earned a two-star rating. He played with future Tulane teammates Duece Watts and Phat Watts. Anderson played for a season at Jones College before committing to South Alabama. However, after receiving an offer from Tulane he decommitted from South Alabama and signed with Tulane. He chose Tulane over an offers from Louisiana-Monroe, South Alabama, and Ole Miss.

Anderson joined Tulane in time for spring practices, and quickly showed his caliber as a potential starter. He played for four seasons at Tulane and was named a team captain. He was also selected to the 2022 Wuerffel Trophy Watch List. Anderson then declared for the 2023 NFL draft, concluding his college football career.

Year	Team	Games	Tackles				Interceptions						Fumbles			
Year	Team	GP	Solo	Ast	Tot	Sck	PD	Int	Yds	Avg	Lng	TD	FF	FR	Yds	TD
2018	Jones College	12	58	16	74	2	0	0	0	0	0	0	0	1	0	0
2019	Tulane	13	19	7	26	1	1	0	0	0	0	0	0	0	0	0
2020	Tulane	12	56	32	88	3.5	0	0	0	0	0	0	0	0	0	0
2021	Tulane	11	40	16	56	4	1	0	0	0	0	0	1	1	2	0
2022	Tulane	14	62	51	113	2	4	0	0	0	0	0	2	0	0	0
NJCAA career		12	58	16	74	2	0	0	0	0	0	0	0	1	0	0
FBS career		50	177	106	283	10.5	6	0	0	0	0	0	3	1	2	0
Career		62	175	122	357	12.5	6	0	0	0	0	0	3	2	2	0

== Professional career ==
Pre-draft measurables
Height	Weight	Arm length	Hand span	Wingspan	40-yard dash	10-yard split	20-yard split	20-yard shuttle	Three-cone drill	Vertical jump	Broad jump	Bench press
5 ft 9 3/8 in (1.76 m)	230 lb (104 kg)	30 in (0.76 m)	8 5/8 in (0.22 m)	6 ft 2 in (1.88 m)	4.63 s	1.55 s	2.57 s	4.40 s	7.21 s	36.5 in (0.93 m)	10 ft 1 in (3.07 m)	20 reps
All values from Pro Day

=== New Orleans Saints ===
After going undrafted in the 2023 NFL draft, Anderson signed with the New Orleans Saints on April 29, 2023. On August 29, Anderson was waived by New Orleans as a part of final roster cuts.

=== Edmonton Elks ===
On March 11, 2024, Anderson signed to play for the Edmonton Elks of the Canadian Football League (CFL). During the 2024 season, Anderson recorded one of the best rookie seasons in recent memory, leading the CFL in total tackles (116), tied for first for defensive tackles (111), while being named All-CFL and winning the CFL's Most Outstanding Rookie Award. His 111 tackles by a rookie are the second-most by a first-year player in the history of the CFL.

On June 6, 2025, Anderson signed an extension through the 2026 season. Due to injuries, he only dressed for seven games, recording 41 defensive tackles and adding a sack.
