= 2020 Tulane Green Wave football team =

American college football season

2020 Tulane Green Wave football

Famous Idaho Potato Bowl, L 27–38 vs. Nevada
- Conference: American Athletic Conference
- Record: 6–6 (3–5 American)
- Head coach: Willie Fritz (5th season)
- Offensive coordinator: Will Hall (2nd season)
- Offensive scheme: Multiple
- Defensive coordinator: Jack Curtis (5th season)
- Base defense: 4–2–5
- Home stadium: Yulman Stadium

2020 American Athletic Conference football standings
	Conf.			Overall
Team	W		L	W		L
No. 8 Cincinnati y$	6	–	0	9	–	1
Tulsa y	6	–	0	6	–	3
Memphis	5	–	3	8	–	3
UCF	5	–	3	6	–	4
SMU	4	–	3	7	–	3
Houston	3	–	3	3	–	5
Navy	3	–	4	3	–	7
Tulane	3	–	5	6	–	6
East Carolina	3	–	5	3	–	6
Temple	1	–	6	1	–	6
South Florida	0	–	7	1	–	8
Championship: Cincinnati 27, Tulsa 24
$ – Conference champion; y – Championship game participant; Rankings from AP Poll.

The 2020 Tulane Green Wave football team represented Tulane University in the 2020 NCAA Division I FBS football season. The Green Wave played their home games at Yulman Stadium in New Orleans, Louisiana, and competed in the American Athletic Conference. They were led by fifth-year head coach Willie Fritz.

On December 10, Fritz announced the firing of defensive coordinator Jack Curtis. The Green Wave went on to complete their regular season with a 6–5 record (3–5 in conference). They subsequently lost to Nevada in the Famous Idaho Potato Bowl.

== Preseason ==
=== Recruiting class ===
College recruiting
Name	Hometown	School	Height	Weight	40^{‡}	Commit date
Angelo Anderson; Defensive Line	New Orleans, LA	John Curtis Christian HS	6 ft 2 in (1.88 m)	260 lb (120 kg)	–	Dec 18, 2019
Angelo Anderson; Defensive Line	Recruit ratings: Scout: Rivals: 247Sports: ESPN:					
Brandon Brown; Defensive Tackle	Katy, TX	Morton Ranch HS	6 ft 2 in (1.88 m)	310 lb (140 kg)	–	Dec 18, 2019
Brandon Brown; Defensive Tackle	Recruit ratings: Scout: Rivals: 247Sports: ESPN:					
Reggie Brown; Tight End	Houston, TX	Legacy School of Sports Science	6 ft 3 in (1.91 m)	250 lb (110 kg)	–	Dec 18, 2019
Reggie Brown; Tight End	Recruit ratings: Scout: Rivals: 247Sports: ESPN:					
Cornelius Dyson; Defensive Back	Kentwood, LA	Kentwood HS	6 ft 2 in (1.88 m)	185 lb (84 kg)	–	Dec 18, 2019
Cornelius Dyson; Defensive Back	Recruit ratings: Scout: Rivals: 247Sports: ESPN:					
Adonis Friloux; Defensive Line	Hahnville, LA	Hahnville HS	6 ft 1 in (1.85 m)	280 lb (130 kg)	–	Feb 5, 2020
Adonis Friloux; Defensive Line	Recruit ratings: Scout: Rivals: 247Sports: ESPN:					
Rashad Green; Offensive Line	Baton Rouge, LA	University Lab HS	6 ft 3 in (1.91 m)	305 lb (138 kg)	–	Dec 18, 2019
Rashad Green; Offensive Line	Recruit ratings: Scout: Rivals: 247Sports: ESPN:					
Kevaris Hall; Defensive Back	Red Oak, TX	Red Oak HS	6 ft 2 in (1.88 m)	185 lb (84 kg)	–	Dec 18, 2019
Kevaris Hall; Defensive Back	Recruit ratings: Scout: Rivals: 247Sports: ESPN:					
Kevin Henry; Linebacker	Baton Rouge, LA	Central HS; Oklahoma State	6 ft 0 in (1.83 m)	240 lb (110 kg)	–	Dec 18, 2019
Kevin Henry; Linebacker	Recruit ratings: Scout: Rivals: 247Sports: ESPN:					
Matthew Hightower; Linebacker	Palos Heights, IL	Shepard HS	6 ft 2 in (1.88 m)	210 lb (95 kg)	–	Dec 18, 2019
Matthew Hightower; Linebacker	Recruit ratings: Scout: Rivals: 247Sports: ESPN:					
Justin Ibieta; Quarterback	Metairie, LA	Metairie Park Country Day	6 ft 5 in (1.96 m)	225 lb (102 kg)	–	Dec 18, 2019
Justin Ibieta; Quarterback	Recruit ratings: Scout: Rivals: 247Sports: ESPN:					
Mykel Jones; Wide Receiver	Patterson, LA	Patterson HS; Oklahoma	5 ft 11 in (1.80 m)	195 lb (88 kg)	–	Dec 18, 2019
Mykel Jones; Wide Receiver	Recruit ratings: Scout: Rivals: 247Sports: ESPN:					
Shi'Keem Laister; Defensive Back	Clanton, AL	Clinton County HS	6 ft 2 in (1.88 m)	185 lb (84 kg)	–	Dec 18, 2019
Shi'Keem Laister; Defensive Back	Recruit ratings: Scout: Rivals: 247Sports: ESPN:					
Matt Lombardi; Offensive Line	Philadelphia, PA	St. Joseph's Prep	6 ft 7 in (2.01 m)	280 lb (130 kg)	–	Dec 18, 2019
Matt Lombardi; Offensive Line	Recruit ratings: Scout: Rivals: 247Sports: ESPN:					
Jesus Machado; Linebacker	Miami, FL	Champagnat Catholic	6 ft 1 in (1.85 m)	215 lb (98 kg)	–	Dec 18, 2019
Jesus Machado; Linebacker	Recruit ratings: Scout: Rivals: 247Sports: ESPN:					
Reggie Neely; Defensive Back	Shelby County, TN	Briarcrest Christian	5 ft 11 in (1.80 m)	175 lb (79 kg)	–	Dec 18, 2019
Reggie Neely; Defensive Back	Recruit ratings: Scout: Rivals: 247Sports: ESPN:					
Michael Pratt; Quarterback	Boca Raton, FL	Deerfield Beach HS	6 ft 2 in (1.88 m)	200 lb (91 kg)	–	Dec 18, 2019
Michael Pratt; Quarterback	Recruit ratings: Scout: Rivals: 247Sports: ESPN:					
Josh Remetich offensive Line	New Orleans, LA	Holy Cross HS	6 ft 4 in (1.93 m)	270 lb (120 kg)	–	Dec 18, 2019
Josh Remetich offensive Line	Recruit ratings: Scout: Rivals: 247Sports: ESPN:					
Joseph Solomon; Offensive Line	Indianapolis, IN	Bishop Chatard HS	6 ft 4 in (1.93 m)	270 lb (120 kg)	–	Dec 18, 2019
Joseph Solomon; Offensive Line	Recruit ratings: Scout: Rivals: 247Sports: ESPN:					
Noah Taliancich; Defensive Line	Destrehan, LA	Destrehan HS	6 ft 2 in (1.88 m)	280 lb (130 kg)	–	Dec 18, 2019
Noah Taliancich; Defensive Line	Recruit ratings: Scout: Rivals: 247Sports: ESPN:					
Trey Tuggle; Defensive Line	Mize, MS	Mize Attendance Center	6 ft 5 in (1.96 m)	315 lb (143 kg)	–	Feb 5, 2020
Trey Tuggle; Defensive Line	Recruit ratings: Scout: Rivals: 247Sports: ESPN:					
Duece Watts; Wide Receiver	Richton, MS	Petal HS; Jones County JC	6 ft 3 in (1.91 m)	200 lb (91 kg)	–	Dec 18, 2019
Duece Watts; Wide Receiver	Recruit ratings: Scout: Rivals: 247Sports: ESPN:					
Phat Watts; Wide Receiver	Richton, MS	Petal HS; Jones County JC	6 ft 0 in (1.83 m)	190 lb (86 kg)	–	Dec 18, 2019
Phat Watts; Wide Receiver	Recruit ratings: Scout: Rivals: 247Sports: ESPN:					

=== Award watch lists ===
Listed in the order that they were released

Award	Player	Position	Year
Doak Walker Award	Amare Jones	RB	JR
Outland Trophy	Corey Dublin	OL	SR
Paul Hornung Award	Amare Jones	RB	JR
Wuerffel Trophy	Sorrell Brown	WR	RS SO

=== AAC preseason media poll ===
The preseason Poll was released September 1

Media poll
Predicted finish	Team	Votes (1st place)
1	UCF	204 (10)
2	Cincinnati	201 (7)
3	Memphis	192 (2)
4	SMU	146
5	Navy	125 (1)
6	Tulane	118
7	Houston	114
8	Temple	88
9	Tulsa	49
10	East Carolina	42
11	South Florida	41

== Schedule ==
Tulane had games scheduled against Mississippi State, Northwestern and Southeastern Louisiana, which was canceled due to the COVID-19 pandemic.

Date	Time	Opponent	Site	TV	Result	Attendance
September 12	6:30 p.m.	at South Alabama*	Hancock Whitney Stadium; Mobile, AL	ESPN2	W 27–24	6,000
September 19	11:00 a.m.	Navy	Yulman Stadium; New Orleans, LA	ABC	L 24–27	0
September 26	1:30 p.m.	at Southern Miss*	M. M. Roberts Stadium; Hattiesburg, MS (Battle for the Bell)	Stadium	W 66–24	0
October 8	6:30 p.m.	at Houston	TDECU Stadium; Houston, TX	ESPN	L 31–49	8,164
October 16	5:00 p.m.	No. 17 SMU^{†}	Yulman Stadium; New Orleans, LA	ESPN	L 34–37 ^{OT}	0
October 24	1:00 p.m.	at UCF	Bounce House; Orlando, FL	ESPN2	L 34–51	9,148
October 31	11:00 a.m.	Temple	Yulman Stadium; New Orleans, LA	ESPN+	W 38–3	1,200
November 7	11:00 a.m.	at East Carolina	Dowdy–Ficklen Stadium; Greenville, NC	ESPN+	W 38–21	3,500
November 14	11:00 a.m.	Army*	Yulman Stadium; New Orleans, LA	ESPN2	W 38–12	1,200
November 19	6:30 p.m.	at No. 25 Tulsa	Skelly Field at H. A. Chapman Stadium; Tulsa, OK	ESPN	L 24–30 ^{2OT}	N/A
December 5	11:00 a.m.	Memphis	Yulman Stadium; New Orleans, LA	ESPN+	W 35–21	2,400
December 22	2:30 p.m.	vs. Nevada*	Albertsons Stadium; Boise, Idaho (Famous Idaho Potato Bowl)	ESPN	L 27–38	0
*Non-conference game; ^{†}Homecoming; Rankings from AP Poll and CFP Rankings after November 24 released prior to game; All times are in Central time

Schedule source:

== Roster ==
2020 Tulane Green Wave football team roster
Players
Coaches
Offense

Pos.	#	Name	Class
WR	1	Mykel Jones	GS
WR	2	Duece Watts	Jr
WR	3	Phat Watts	Jr
WR	4	Jha'Quan Jackson	So
RB	5	Stephon Huderson	Sr
RB	6	Corey Dauphine	Sr
QB	7	Michael Pratt	Fr
QB	8	Josh Coltrin	So
QB	9	Keon Howard	Sr
RB	11	Amare Jones	Jr
TE	14	Christian Daniels	So
WR	15	Jacob Robertson Jr.	Sr
QB	19	Josh Holl	So
RB	20	Cameron Carroll	So
RB	22	Tyjae Spears	Fr
RB	27	Ygenio Booker	So
WR	30	Logan Ammons	Jr
TE	46	Keitha Jones Jr.	Jr
OL	51	Stephen Lewerenz	So
OL	52	Sincere Haynesworth	So
OL	61	Colby Orgeron	Fr
OL	63	Cameron Jackel	Jr
OL	64	Corey Dublin	Sr
OL	65	Ben Knutson	GS
OL	66	Nik Hogan	So
OL	70	Timothy Shafter	Jr
OL	72	Caleb Thomas	Fr
OL	74	Jackson Fort	Fr
OL	76	Michael Remondet	So
OL	78	Trace Oldner	Fr
OL	79	Joey Claybrook	Jr
TE	80	Tyrick James	Jr
WR	81	Tyrek Presley	Fr
WR	82	Jaetavian Toles	Sr
WR	83	Dane Ledford	Jr
TE	84	Will Wallace	Jr
WR	85	Ryan Thompson	So
WR	86	Sorrell Brown	So
TE	88	Keshon Williams	Fr
TE	89	Conner Richardson	Fr

Defense

Pos.	#	Name	Class
DE	5	Cameron Sample	Sr
DE	7	Patrick Johnson	Sr
CB	8	Willie Langham	Jr
CB	9	Jaylon Monroe	Sr
S	12	Ton'Quez Ball	Fr
DB	16	Levi Williams	Fr
DB	19	Kiland Harrison	Fr
DB	21	Chris Joyce	Jr
S	23	Tyler Judson	Fr
LB	24	Dorian Williams	So
LB	28	Marvin Moody Jr.	Sr
S	30	Jonathan Mestayer II	Fr
S	31	Larry Brooks	Jr
S	32	Chadwick Bailey	Fr
LB	33	Kevin Henry	GS
S	34	Kanyon Walker	Fr
LB	35	Jesus Machado	Fr
S	36	Chase Kuerschen	Sr
S	37	Macon Clark	Jr
S	38	KJ Vault	Jr
LB	40	Nick Anderson	Jr
OLB	41	Darius Hodges	Fr
DE	42	Torri Singletary Jr.	Jr
DE	44	Juan Monjarres	Jr
NT	48	De'Andre Williams	Sr
OLB	49	Armoni Dixon	Fr
DE	54	Carlos Hatcher	So
DL	55	Noah Taliancich	Fr
LB	59	Sam Bruchhaus	Jr
DL	73	Dane Ziegler	Jr
NT	77	Jeffery Johnson	Jr
DE	90	Davon Wright	Jr
DE	91	Noah Seiden	So
DL	94	Eric Hicks Jr.	Fr
DE	99	Alfred Thomas	Jr

Special teams

Pos.	#	Name	Class
K, P	43	Coby Neenan	Sr
LS	57	Ethan Hudak	Fr
K	62	Merek Glover	Sr
K	67	Graham Dable	So
LS	68	Matt Smith	Jr
K	92	Sterling Stockwell	So
K	96	Casey Glover	So
P	97	Ryan Wright	Jr

Head coach

- Willie Fritz (Pittsburg State)

Coordinators/assistant coaches

- Will Hall (North Alabama)
  Offensive coordinator
- Jack Curtis (Evangel)
  Defensive coordinator, safeties
- Jamaal Fobbs (Oklahoma State)
  Running backs
- Byron Dawson (Louisiana State)
  Defensive line
- Slade Nagle (McNeese State)
  Tight ends
- Michael Mutz (Colorado Mesa)
  Linebackers
- Joshua Christian–Young (Central Missouri)
  Defensive backs
- Jeff Conway (Northwest Missouri State)
  Wide receivers
- J. J. McCleskey (Tennessee)
  Secondary
- Cody Kennedy (Southeastern Louisiana)
  Offensive line

Legend

- (C) Team captain
- (S) Suspended
- (I) Ineligible
- Injured
- Redshirt

Roster
Last update: April 18, 2020

== Game summaries ==
=== At South Alabama ===
Tulane at South Alabama

Team	1	2	3	4	Total
• Green Wave	0	6	7	14	27
Jaguars	0	14	10	0	24

- Date: September 12, 2020
- Location: Hancock Whitney Stadium
  Mobile, AL
- Game start: 6:30 p.m. CDT
- Elapsed time: 3 hours and 36 minutes
- Game attendance: 6,000
- Game weather: 85 °F (29 °C) • Weather: Partly Cloudy • Wind: 0 MPH
- Referee: Marshall Lewis
- TV announcers (ESPN2): Mike Couzens (play–by–play), Dustin Fox (analyst), and Lauren Sisler (sideline reporter)

Scoring summary
2	10:51	USA	Kawaan Baker 34-yard pass from Chance Lovertich (Diego Guajardo kick) (9 plays, 80 yards, 2:46)	USA 0–7
2	09:27	TULN	Cameron Carroll 6-yard rush (Merek Glover PAT failed) (4 plays, 75 yards, 1:24)	USA 6–7
2	06:46	USA	Jalen Wayne 13-yard pass from Chance Lovertich (Diego Guajardo kick) (5 plays, 75 yards, 2:41)	USA 6–14
3	12:15	USA	Carlos Davis 2-yard rush (Diego Guajardo kick) (6 plays, 75 yards, 2:45)	USA 6–21
3	07:38	USA	Diego Guajardo 49-yard field goal (7 plays, 24 yards, 2:54)	USA 6–24
3	05:07	TULN	Cameron Carroll 12-yard rush (Merek Glover kick) (6 plays, 60 yards, 2:31)	USA 13–24
4	14:42	TULN	Keon Howard 1-yard rush (two-point conversion rush attempt failed) (5 plays, 42 yards, 1:48)	USA 19–24
4	03:18	TULN	Amare Jones 16-yard rush (Keon Howard two-point conversion pass to Tyrick James) (6 plays, 67 yards, 1:48)	TULN 27–24

Statistics	Tulane	South Alabama
First downs	22	21
Total yards	394	386
Rushing yards	203	65
Passing yards	191	321
Turnovers	1	1
Time of possession	26:02	33:58

Team	Category	Player	Statistics
Tulane	Passing	Keon Howard	14/30, 190 yards
Tulane	Rushing	Tyjae Spears	11 carries, 106 yards
Tulane	Receiving	Jha'Quan Jackson	3 receptions, 44 yards
South Alabama	Passing	Chase Lovertich	18/30, 249 yards, 2 TDs
South Alabama	Rushing	Carlos Davis	17 carries, 89 yards, 1 TD
South Alabama	Receiving	Kawaan Baker	7 receptions, 129 yards, 1 TD

=== Navy ===
Navy at Tulane

Team	1	2	3	4	Total
• Midshipmen	0	0	16	11	27
Green Wave	10	14	0	0	24

- Date: September 19, 2020
- Location: Yulman Stadium
  New Orleans, LA
- Game start: 11:07 a.m. CDT
- Elapsed time: 3 hours and 20 minutes
- Game attendance: 0
- Game weather: 72 °F (22 °C) • Weather: Rainy • Wind: 16 NE MPH
- Referee: Hank Johns
- TV announcers (ABC): Mark Jones (play–by–play), Dusty Dvoracek (analyst), and Quint Kessenich (sideline reporter)

Scoring summary
1	09:59	TULN	Cameron Carroll 3-yard rush (Merek Glover kick) (5 plays, 66 yards, 1:49)	TULN 0–7
1	02:04	TULN	Merek Glover 22-yard field goal (14 plays, 54 yards, 5:55)	TULN 0–10
2	11:43	TULN	Phat Watts 3-yard rush (Merek Glover kick) (11 plays, 63 yards, 3:31)	TULN 0–17
2	03:03	TULN	Cameron Carroll 24-yard rush (Merek Glover kick) (7 plays, 93 yards, 3:01)	TULN 0–24
3	06:43	NAVY	Nelson Smith 1-yard rush (Bijan Nichols kick) (3 plays, 69 yards, 0:53)	TULN 7–24
3	02:46	NAVY	Nelson Smith 1-yard rush (Bijan Nichols kick) (6 plays, 61 yards, 2:23)	TULN 14–24
3	00:32	NAVY	Team Safety (1 play, −1 yard, 0:06)	TULN 16–24
4	13:22	NAVY	Mychal Cooper 32-yard pass from Dalen Morris (Dalen Morris two-point conversion pass to Devin Matthews) (6 plays, 57 yards, 2:01)	TIE 24–24
4	00:00	NAVY	Bijan Nichols 33-yard field goal (10 plays, 52 yards, 4:41)	NAVY 27–24

Statistics	Navy	Tulane
First downs	17	18
Total yards	350	373
Rushing yards	204	265
Passing yards	146	108
Turnovers	0	1
Time of possession	32:35	27:25

Team	Category	Player	Statistics
Navy	Passing	Dalen Morris	6/11, 139 yards, 1 TD
Navy	Rushing	Jamale Carothers	25 carries, 127 yards
Navy	Receiving	Mychal Cooper	3 receptions, 71 yards, 1 TD
Tulane	Passing	Keon Howard	10/25, 108 yards, 1 INT
Tulane	Rushing	Tyjae Spears	18 carries, 119 yards
Tulane	Receiving	Tyrick James	2 receptions, 38 yards

=== At Southern Miss ===
Tulane at Southern Mississippi

Team	1	2	3	4	Total
• Green Wave	7	24	21	14	66
Golden Eagles	14	7	3	0	24

- Date: September 26, 2020
- Location: M. M. Roberts Stadium
  Hattiesburg, MS
- Game start: 1:36 p.m. CDT
- Elapsed time: 3 hours and 44 minutes
- Game attendance: 0
- Game weather: 74 °F (23 °C) • Weather: Partly Sunny
- Referee: Joe Lehring
- TV announcers (Stadium): Chris Hassel (play–by–play) and A. J. Hawk (analyst)

Scoring summary
1	11:26	USM	Kevin Perkins 2-yard rush (Briggs Bourgeois kick) (9 plays, 75 yards, 3:34)	USM 0–7
1	10:31	USM	Jason Brownlee 88-yard pass from Jack Abraham (Briggs Bourgeois kick) (1 play, 88 yards, 0:14)	USM 0–14
1	06:58	TULN	Tyjae Spears 15-yard rush (Merek Glover kick) (12 play, 77 yards, 5:46)	USM 7–14
2	14:01	TULN	Tyjae Spears 15-yard rush (Merek Glover kick) (12 play, 77 yards, 5:46)	TIE 14–14
2	12:57	USM	Naricuss Driver 61-yard pass from Jack Abraham (Briggs Bourgeois kick) (3 play, 75 yards, 1:04)	USM 14–21
2	06:14	TULN	Cameron Carroll 16-yard pass from Michael Pratt (Merek Glover kick) (3 play, 35 yards, 1:00)	TIE 21–21
2	01:41	TULN	Merek Glover 41-yard field goal (10 play, 36 yards, 3:35)	TULN 24–21
2	00:41	TULN	Cameron Carroll 30-yard rush (Merek Glover kick) (3 play, 52 yards, 0:25)	TULN 31–21
3	14:36	TULN	Cameron Carroll 52-yard rush (Merek Glover kick) (2 play, 65 yards, 0:19)	TULN 38–21
3	10:18	USM	Briggs Bourgeois 49-yard field goal (10 play, 52 yards, 4:13)	TULN 38–24
3	04:49	TULN	Jha'Quan Jackson 42-yard pass from Michael Pratt (Merek Glover kick) (5 play, 75 yards, 1:15)	TULN 45–24
3	01:57	TULN	Stephon Huderson 47-yard rush (Merek Glover kick) (2 play, 47 yards, 0:15)	TULN 52–24
4	08:03	TULN	Michael Pratt 1-yard rush (Merek Glover kick) (13 play, 59 yards, 6:50)	TULN 59–24
4	03:03	TULN	Cameron Carroll 19-yard rush (Merek Glover kick) (6 play, 40 yards, 3:02)	TULN 66–24

Statistics	Tulane	Southern Miss
First downs	27	19
Total yards	572	369
Rushing yards	430	70
Passing yards	142	299
Turnovers	1	2
Time of possession	29:08	30:52

Team	Category	Player	Statistics
Tulane	Passing	Michael Pratt	8/18, 142 yards, 2 TDs
Tulane	Rushing	Cameron Carroll	15 carries, 163 yards, 3 TDs
Tulane	Receiving	Jha'Quan Jackson	1 reception, 42 yards, 1 TD
Southern Miss	Passing	Jack Abraham	23/38, 299 yards, 2 TDs, 1 INT
Southern Miss	Rushing	Dee Baker	6 carries, 44 yards
Southern Miss	Receiving	Jason Brownlee	3 receptions, 110 yards, 1 TD

=== At Houston ===
Tulane at Houston

Team	1	2	3	4	Total
Green Wave	17	7	7	0	31
• Cougars	7	14	21	7	49

- Date: October 8, 2020
- Location: TDECU Stadium
  Houston, TX
- Game start: 6:30 p.m. CDT
- Elapsed time: 3 hours and 58 minutes
- Game attendance: 8,164
- Game weather: 78 °F (26 °C) • Weather: Cloudy, Humid • Wind: NE 10 MPH
- Referee: Edwin Lee
- TV announcers (ESPN): Bob Wischusen (play–by–play), Mike Golic Jr. (analyst), and Kris Budden (sideline reporter)

Scoring summary
1	13:42	TULN	Macon Clark 64-yard interception returned (Merek Glover kick) (5 plays, 36 yards, 1:18)	TULN 7–0
1	11:07	HOU	Mulbah Car 5-yard rush (Dalton Witherspoon kick) (6 plays, 75 yards, 2:35)	TIE 7–7
1	09:23	TULN	Jeffrey Johnson 1-yard fumble returned (Merek Glover kick) (2 plays, −13 yards, 0:38)	TULN 14–7
1	03:50	TULN	Merek Glover 39-yard field goal (10 plays, 36 yards, 4:43)	TULN 17–7
2	13:50	TULN	Michael Pratt 1-yard rush (Merek Glover kick) (9 plays, 50 yards, 4:26)	TULN 24–7
2	09:47	HOU	Clayton Tune 1-yard rush (Dalton Witherspoon kick) (10 plays, 75 yards, 4:03)	TULN 24–14
2	03:53	HOU	Ke'Andre Street 23-yard pass from Clayton Tune (Dalton Witherspoon kick) (11 plays, 68 yards, 3:48)	TULN 24–21
3	07:53	HOU	Mulbah Car 3-yard rush (Dalton Witherspoon kick) (10 plays, 57 yards, 5:09)	HOU 24–28
3	05:53	TULN	Jha'Quan Jackson 8-yard pass from Michael Pratt (Merek Glover kick) (6 plays, 75 yards, 2:00)	TULN 31–28
3	05:36	HOU	Marquez Stevenson 97-yard kickoff returned (Dalton Witherspoon kick) (0 plays, 0 yards, 0:00)	HOU 31–35
3	00:46	HOU	Kyle Porter 1-yard rush (Dalton Witherspoon kick) (8 plays, 60 yards, 3:21)	HOU 31–42
4	14:03	HOU	Marquez Stevenson 41-yard pass from Clayton Tune (Dalton Witherspoon kick) (2 plays, 43 yards, 0:38)	HOU 31–49

Statistics	Tulane	Houston
First downs	16	22
Total yards	211	476
Rushing yards	70	157
Passing yards	141	319
Turnovers	0	5
Time of possession	28:47	31:13

Team	Category	Player	Statistics
Tulane	Passing	Michael Pratt	11/25, 141 yards, 1 TD
Tulane	Rushing	Cameron Carroll	18 carries, 34 yards
Tulane	Receiving	Duece Watts	2 receptions, 50 yards
Houston	Passing	Clayton Tune	20/33, 319 yards, 2 TDs, 2 INTs
Houston	Rushing	Kyle Porter	11 carries, 57 yards, 1 TD
Houston	Receiving	Marquez Stevenson	5 receptions, 118 yards, 1 TD

=== SMU ===
Southern Methodist at Tulane

Team	1	2	3	4	OT	Total
• No. 17 Mustangs	10	7	10	7	3	37
Green Wave	7	10	7	10	0	34

- Date: October 16, 2020
- Location: Yulman Stadium
  New Orleans, LA
- Game start: 5:05 p.m. CDT
- Elapsed time: 3 hours and 45 minutes
- Game attendance: 0
- Game weather: 70 °F (21 °C) • Weather: Mostly Cloudy • Wind: N 14 MPH
- Referee: Anthony Calabre
- TV announcers (ESPN): Beth Mowins (play–by–play), Kirk Morrison (analyst), and Lauren Sisler (sideline reporter)

Scoring summary
1	11:32	TULN	Mykel Jones 31-yard pass from Michael Pratt (Merek Glover kick) (4 plays, 45 yards, 1:35)	TULN 0–7
1	09:59	SMU	Danny Gray 32-yard rush (Chris Naggar kick) (5 plays, 91 yards, 1:33)	TIE 7–7
1	05:32	SMU	Chris Naggar 48-yard field goal (7 plays, 43 yards, 2:00)	SMU 10–7
2	06:26	TULN	Michael Pratt 1-yard rush (Merek Glover kick) (11 plays, 72 yards, 5:29)	TULN 10–14
2	02:43	SMU	Rashee Rice 10-yard pass from Shane Buechele (Chris Naggar kick) (9 plays, 75 yards, 3:43)	SMU 17–14
2	00:44	TULN	Merek Glover 34-yard field goal (10 plays, 63 yards, 1:59)	TIE 17–17
3	11:38	TULN	Stephon Huderson 22-yard rush (Merek Glover kick) (6 plays, 49 yards, 1:38)	TULN 17–24
3	10:26	SMU	Ulysses Bentley IV 2-yard rush (Chris Naggar kick) (3 plays, 75 yards, 1:12)	TIE 24–24
3	03:17	SMU	Chris Naggar 33-yard field goal (11 plays, 74 yards, 6:16)	SMU 27–24
4	12:59	TULN	Michael Pratt 7-yard rush (Merek Glover kick) (6 plays, 37 yards, 2:21)	TULN 27–31
4	07:12	SMU	Danny Gray 10-yard pass from Shane Buechele (Chris Naggar kick) (14 plays, 81 yards, 5:47)	SMU 34–31
4	01:30	TULN	Merek Glover 27-yard field goal (13 plays, 65 yards, 5:42)	TIE 34–34
1OT		SMU	Chris Naggar 34-yard field goal (4 plays, 8 yards)	SMU 37–34

Statistics	SMU	Tulane
First downs	25	23
Total yards	581	387
Rushing yards	142	195
Passing yards	439	192
Turnovers	1	1
Time of possession	31:01	28:59

Team	Category	Player	Statistics
SMU	Passing	Shane Buechele	23/37, 384 yards, 2 TDs
SMU	Rushing	Ulysses Bentley IV	25 carries, 94 yards, 1 TD
SMU	Receiving	Rashee Rice	7 receptions, 139 yards, 1 TD
Tulane	Passing	Michael Pratt	12/29, 192 yards, 1 TD, 1 INT
Tulane	Rushing	Stephon Huderson	19 carries, 132 yards, 1 TD
Tulane	Receiving	Duece Watts	3 receptions, 56 yards

=== At UCF ===
Tulane at Central Florida

Team	1	2	3	4	Total
Green Wave	14	0	14	6	34
• Knights	10	27	14	0	51

- Date: October 24, 2020
- Location: Spectrum Stadium
  Orlando, FL
- Game start: 1:05 p.m. CDT
- Elapsed time: 3 hours and 40 minutes
- Game attendance: 9,148
- Game weather: 84 °F (29 °C) • Weather: Mostly Cloudy • Wind: W 7 MPH
- TV announcers (ESPN2): Roy Philpott (play–by–play), Kelly Stouffer (analyst), and Eric Wood (sideline reporter)

Scoring summary
1	11:35	UCF	Daniel Obarski 23-yard field goal (8 plays, 69 yards, 3:25)	UCF 3–0
1	09:22	TULN	Deuce Watts 28-yard pass from Michael Pratt (Merek Glover kick) (7 plays, 69 yards, 2:05)	TULN 7–3
1	08:04	UCF	Marlon Williams 54-yard pass from Dillon Gabriel (Daniel Obarski kick) (5 plays, 79 yards, 1:12)	UCF 10–7
1	04:15	TULN	Jha'Quan Jackson 20-yard pass from Michael Pratt (Merek Glover kick) (8 plays, 79 yards, 3:43)	TULN 14–10
2	13:41	UCF	Greg McCrae 3-yard rush (Daniel Obarski kick) (5 plays, 89 yards, 1:12)	UCF 17–14
2	09:20	UCF	Bentavious Thompson 2-yard rush (Daniel Obarski kick) (10 plays, 71 yards, 2:30)	UCF 24–14
2	03:13	UCF	Jake Hescock 4-yard pass from Dillon Gabriel (Daniel Obarski kick) (14 plays, 83 yards, 3:58)	UCF 31–14
2	00:05	UCF	Marlon Williams 7-yard pass from Dillon Gabriel (Daniel Obarski kick) (8 plays, 67 yards, 1:21)	UCF 37–14
3	09:22	TULN	Tyrick James 0-yard fumble returned (Merek Glover kick) (12 plays, 75 yards, 5:38)	UCF 37–21
3	07:47	UCF	Marlon Williams 35-yard pass from Dillon Gabriel (Daniel Obarski kick) (6 plays, 49 yards, 1:33)	UCF 44–21
3	03:56	TULN	Jha'Quan Jackson 8-yard pass from Michael Pratt (Merek Glover kick) (8 plays, 75 yards, 3:51)	UCF 44–28
3	03:26	UCF	Jacob Harris 41-yard pass from Dillon Gabriel (Daniel Obarski kick) (3 plays, 43 yards, 0:29)	UCF 51–28
4	08:30	TULN	Stephon Huderson 9-yard rush (two-point conversion rush attempt failed) (2 plays, 9 yards, 0:47)	UCF 51–34

Statistics	Tulane	UCF
First downs	21	36
Total yards	340	689
Rushing yards	125	267
Passing yards	215	422
Turnovers	1	0
Time of possession	25:46	34:14

Team	Category	Player	Statistics
Tulane	Passing	Michael Pratt	14/24, 215 yards, 3 TDs, 1 INT
Tulane	Rushing	Stephon Huderson	14 carries, 88 yards, 1 TD
Tulane	Receiving	Jha'Quan Jackson	4 receptions, 59 yards, 2 TDs
UCF	Passing	Dillon Gabriel	26/40, 422 yards, 5 TDs
UCF	Rushing	Greg McCrae	25 carries, 162 yards, 1 TD
UCF	Receiving	Marlon Williams	9 receptions, 174 yards, 3 TDs

=== Temple ===
Temple at Tulane

Team	1	2	3	4	Total
Owls	3	0	0	0	3
• Green Wave	0	10	14	14	38

- Date: October 31, 2020
- Location: Yulman Stadium
  New Orleans, LA
- Game start: 11:05 a.m. CDT
- Elapsed time: 3 hours
- Game attendance: 1,200
- Game weather: 61 °F (16 °C) • Weather: Fair • Wind: NE 5 MPH
- Referee: Henry Johns
- TV announcers (ESPN+): Lincoln Rose (play–by–play) and Keith Moreland (analyst)

Scoring summary
1	10:37	TEM	Rory Bell 22-yard field goal (8 plays, 54 yards, 3:17)	TEM 3–0
2	11:55	TULN	Merek Glover 40-yard field goal (10 plays, 67 yards, 4:12)	TIE 3–3
2	06:50	TULN	Cameron Carroll 13-yard rush (Merek Glover kick) (6 plays, 93 yards, 2:27)	TULN 10–3
3	05:36	TULN	Deuce Watts 31-yard pass from Michael Pratt (Merek Glover kick) (6 plays, 65 yards, 2:27)	TULN 17–3
3	01:43	TULN	Deuce Watts 5-yard pass from Michael Pratt (Merek Glover kick) (5 plays, 30 yards, 2:32)	TULN 24–3
4	12:01	TULN	Michael Pratt 9-yard rush (Merek Glover kick) (3 plays, 40 yards, 1:15)	TULN 31–3
4	03:53	TULN	Jaetavian Toles 15-yard pass from Keon Howard (Merek Glover kick) (10 plays, 55 yards, 6:05)	TULN 38–3

Statistics	Temple	Tulane
First downs	11	28
Total yards	222	504
Rushing yards	77	284
Passing yards	145	220
Turnovers	1	3
Time of possession	28:15	31:45

Team	Category	Player	Statistics
Temple	Passing	Trad Beatty	11/18, 122 yards, 1 INT
Temple	Rushing	Re-al Mitchell	7 carries, 37 yards
Temple	Receiving	Branden Mack	3 receptions, 54 yards
Tulane	Passing	Michael Pratt	12/21, 205 yards, 2 TDs, 1 INT
Tulane	Rushing	Amare Jones	12 carries, 92 yards
Tulane	Receiving	Deuce Watts	5 receptions, 114 yards, 2 TDs

=== At East Carolina ===
Tulane at East Carolina

Team	1	2	3	4	Total
• Green Wave	7	14	10	7	38
Pirates	7	0	0	14	21

- Date: November 7, 2020
- Location: Dowdy–Ficklen Stadium
  Greenville, NC
- Game start: 11:05 a.m. CST
- Elapsed time: 3 hours and 11 minutes
- Game attendance: 3,500
- Game weather: 75 °F (24 °C) • Weather: Mostly Clear • Wind: E 5 MPH
- Referee: Luke Richmond
- TV announcers (ESPN+): Evan Lepler (play–by–play) and Jay Sonnhalter (analyst)

Scoring summary
1	11:09	TULN	Deuce Watts 35-yard pass from Michael Pratt (Merek Glover kick) (9 plays, 78 yards, 3:51)	TULN 7–0
1	06:48	ECU	Tyler Snead 10-yard pass from Holton Ahlers (Jake Verity kick) (10 plays, 75 yards, 4:21)	TIE 7–7
2	07:28	TULN	Tyrick James 5-yard pass from Michael Pratt (Merek Glover kick) (4 plays, 54 yards, 1:58)	TULN 14–7
2	00:38	TULN	Deuce Watts 5-yard pass from Michael Pratt (Merek Glover kick) (7 plays, 65 yards, 2:58)	TULN 21–7
3	05:49	TULN	Cameron Carroll 48-yard rush (Merek Glover kick) (4 plays, 65 yards, 1:57)	TULN 28–7
3	00:38	TULN	Merek Glover 42-yard field goal (7 plays, 37 yards, 3:15)	TULN 31–7
4	10:37	ECU	Blake Proehl 30-yard pass from Holton Ahlers (Holton Ahlers two-point conversion pass to Tyler Snead) (4 plays, 35 yards, 1:53)	TULN 31–15
4	05:17	TULN	Cameron Carroll 28-yard rush (Merek Glover kick) (1 play, 28 yards, 0:06)	TULN 38–15
4	05:07	ECU	Blake Proehl 75-yard pass from Holton Ahlers (two-point conversion pass attempt failed) (1 play, 75 yards, 0:10)	TULN 38–21

Statistics	Tulane	East Carolina
First downs	24	20
Total yards	493	386
Rushing yards	277	35
Passing yards	216	351
Turnovers	1	1
Time of possession	30:59	29:01

Team	Category	Player	Statistics
Tulane	Passing	Michael Pratt	22/34, 216 yards, 3 TDs, 1 INT
Tulane	Rushing	Cameron Carroll	6 carries, 129 yards, 2 TDs
Tulane	Receiving	Deuce Watts	5 receptions, 57 yards, 2 TDs
East Carolina	Passing	Holton Ahlers	27/43, 351 yards, 3 TDs
East Carolina	Rushing	Rahjai Harris	13 carries, 27 yards
East Carolina	Receiving	Blake Proehl	13 receptions, 182 yards, 2 TDs

=== Army ===
Army at Tulane

Team	1	2	3	4	Total
RV Black Knights	0	12	0	0	12
• Green Wave	14	0	10	14	38

- Date: November 14, 2020
- Location: Yulman Stadium
  New Orleans, LA
- Game start: 11:01 a.m. CST
- Elapsed time: 3 hours and 14 minutes
- Game attendance: 1,200
- Game weather: 78 °F (26 °C) • Weather: Sunny and Warm • Wind: SE 11 MPH
- Referee: Marcus Woods
- TV announcers (ESPN2): Joel Meyers (play–by–play) and Brian Kinchen (analyst)

Scoring summary
1	08:55	TULN	Tyrick James 4-yard pass from Michael Pratt (Merek Glover kick) (10 plays, 53 yards, 4:48)	TULN 7–0
1	00:47	TULN	Amare Jones 50-yard rush (Merek Glover kick) (1 play, 50 yards, 0:11)	TULN 14–0
2	10:25	ARMY	Tyrell Robinson 10-yard pass from Christian Anderson (Landon Salyers PAT blocked) (10 plays, 75 yards, 5:22)	TULN 14–6
2	04:12	ARMY	Christian Anderson 19-yard rush (two-point conversion rush attempt failed) (8 plays, 59 yards, 4:36)	TULN 14–12
3	10:23	TULN	Jha'Quan Jackson 21-yard pass from Michael Pratt (Merek Glover kick) (9 plays, 75 yards, 4:37)	TULN 21–12
3	05:38	TULN	Merek Glover 26-yard field goal (8 plays, 45 yards, 3:27)	TULN 24–12
4	04:26	TULN	Jha'Quan Jackson 4-yard rush (Merek Glover kick) (2 plays, 17 yards, 0:58)	TULN 31–12
4	04:20	TULN	Jaetavian Toles 8-yard fumble returned (Merek Glover kick) (0 plays, −2 yards, 0:06)	TULN 38–12

Statistics	Army	Tulane
First downs	17	17
Total yards	303	368
Rushing yards	270	171
Passing yards	33	197
Turnovers	3	0
Time of possession	32:27	27:33

Team	Category	Player	Statistics
Army	Passing	Christian Anderson	4/12, 36 yards, 1 TD, 2 INTs
Army	Rushing	Christian Anderson	17 carries, 77 yards, 1 TD
Army	Receiving	Michael Roberts	1 reception, 12 yards
Tulane	Passing	Michael Pratt	19/27, 197 yards, 2 TDs
Tulane	Rushing	Amare Jones	5 carries, 60 yards, 1 TD
Tulane	Receiving	Deuce Watts	6 receptions, 85 yards

=== At Tulsa ===
Tulane at Tulsa

Team	1	2	3	4	Total
Green Wave	0	0	14	7	21
No. 25 Golden Hurricane	0	0	0	21	21

- Date: November 19, 2020
- Location: Skelly Field at H. A. Chapman Stadium
  Tulsa, OK
- Game start: 6:30 p.m. CST
- Elapsed time: 3 hours and 57 minutes
- Game attendance: 0
- Game weather: 69 °F (21 °C) • Weather: Clear • Wind: S 14 MPH
- Referee: Edwin Lee
- TV announcers (ESPN): Matt Barrie (play–by–play), Mike Golic Jr. (analyst), and Kris Budden (sideline reporter)

Scoring summary
3	05:25	TULN	Stephon Huderson 5-yard rush (Merek Glover kick) (7 plays, 50 yards, 2:47)	TULN 7–0
3	03:07	TULN	Will Wallace 27-yard pass from Michael Pratt (Merek Glover kick) (2 plays, 27 yards, 0:44)	TULN 14–0
4	09:17	TUL	Davis Brin 18-yard rush (Zach Long kick) (10 plays, 84 yards, 3:01)	TULN 14–7
4	03:16	TUL	Josh Johnson 19-yard pass from Davis Brin (Zack Long kick) (11 plays, 71 yards, 3:18)	TIE 14–14
4	01:38	TULN	Tyrick James 19-yard pass from Michael Pratt (Merek Glover kick) (5 plays, 28 yards, 1:38)	TULN 21–14
4	00:00	TUL	JuanCarlos Santana 37-yard pass from Davis Brin (Zack Long kick) (9 plays, 75 yards, 1:38)	TIE 21–21
1OT		TUL	Zack Long 27-yard field goal (6 plays, 16 yards	TUL 24–21
1OT		TULN	Merek Glover 39-yard field goal (5 plays, 3 yards	TIE 24–24
2OT		TUL	Zaven Collins 96-yard interception return (5 plays, 22 yards	TUL 30–24

Statistics	Tulane	Tulsa
First downs	18	26
Total yards	302	522
Rushing yards	226	179
Passing yards	76	343
Turnovers	1	3
Time of possession	29:20	30:40

Team	Category	Player	Statistics
Tulane	Passing	Michael Pratt	8/17, 76 yards, 2 TDs, 1 INT
Tulane	Rushing	Stephon Huderson	25 carries, 106 yards, 1 TD
Tulane	Receiving	Will Wallace	2 receptions, 34 yards, 1 TD
Tulsa	Passing	Davis Brin	18/28, 266 yards, 2 TDs
Tulsa	Rushing	Corey Taylor II	19 carries, 132 yards
Tulsa	Receiving	JuanCarlos Santana	8 receptions, 138 yards, 1 TD

=== Memphis ===
Memphis at Tulane

Team	1	2	3	4	Total
Tigers	7	7	7	0	21
• Green Wave	14	7	7	7	35

- Date: December 5, 2020
- Location: Yulman Stadium
  New Orleans, LA
- Game start: 11:05 p.m. CST
- Elapsed time: 3 hours and 24 minutes
- Game attendance: 2,400
- Game weather: 52 °F (11 °C) • Weather: Partly Cloudy • Wind: NE 10 MPH
- Referee: Charles Lamerti
- TV announcers (ESPN+): David Saltzman (play–by–play) and Keith Moreland (analyst)

Scoring summary
1	10:58	TULN	Duece Watts 15-yard pas from Michael Pratt (Merek Glover kick) (10 plays, 75 yards, 4:02)	TULN 7–0
1	10:05	MEM	Calvin Austin 59-yard pass from Brady White (Riley Patterson kick) (4 plays, 75 yards, 0:53)	TIE 7–7
1	04:00	TULN	Jha'Quan Jackson 42-yard pas from Michael Pratt (Merek Glover kick) (7 plays, 65 yards, 3:20)	TULN 14–7
2	11:09	TULN	Michael Pratt 3-yard rush (Merek Glover kick) (9 plays, 83 yards, 3:55)	TULN 21–7
2	01:18	MEM	Tahj Washington 2-yard rush (Riley Patterson kick) (13 plays, 67 yards, 4:38)	TULN 21–14
3	08:59	TULN	Michael Pratt 10-yard rush (Merek Glover kick) (7 plays, 57 yards, 3:09)	TULN 28–14
3	05:13	MEM	Sean Dykes 6-yard pass from Brady White (Riley Patterson kick) (9 plays, 70 yards, 3:38)	TULN 28–21
4	11:34	TULN	Cameron Carroll 9-yard rush (Merek Glover kick) (11 plays, 80 yards, 4:13)	TULN 35–21

Statistics	Memphis	Tulane
First downs	20	26
Total yards	300	419
Rushing yards	45	165
Passing yards	255	254
Turnovers	2	1
Time of possession	25:56	34:04

Team	Category	Player	Statistics
Memphis	Passing	Brady White	19/38, 248 yards, 2 TDs, 2 INTs
Memphis	Rushing	Asa Martin	13 carries, 39 yards
Memphis	Receiving	Calvin Austin	5 receptions, 110 yards, 1 TD
Tulane	Passing	Michael Pratt	21/33, 254 yards, 2 TDs
Tulane	Rushing	Stephon Huderson	10 carries, 67 yards
Tulane	Receiving	Jha'Quan Jackson	3 receptions, 57 yards, 1 TD

=== Vs. Nevada (Famous Idaho Potato Bowl) ===
2020 Famous Idaho Potato Bowl

Team	1	2	3	4	Total
Green Wave	0	7	13	7	27
• Wolf Pack	6	20	0	12	38

- Date: December 22, 2020
- Location: Albertsons Stadium
  Boise, ID
- Game start: 2:35 p.m. CST
- Elapsed time: 3 hours and 23 minutes
- Game attendance: 0
- Game weather: 40 °F (4 °C) • Weather: Partly Cloudy • Wind: W 22 MPH
- Referee: Steve Strimling
- TV announcers (ESPN/1stTm): Chris Cotter (play–by–play), Mark Herzlich (analyst), and Taylor Davis (sideline reporter)/Brian Roth (play-by-play) and Hans Olsen (analyst)

Scoring summary
1	04:58	NEV	Cole Turner 11-yard pass from Carson Strong (Brandon Talton PAT failed) (2 plays, 8 yards, 0:43)	NEV 6–0
2	14:52	NEV	Justin Lockhart 23-yard pass from Carson Strong (Brandon Talton kick) (7 plays, 71 yards, 3:15)	NEV 13–0
2	12:42	NEV	Toa Taua 44-yard pass from Carson Strong (two-point pass conversion attempt failed) (3 plays, 55 yards, 1:18)	NEV 19–0
2	10:38	TULN	Jha'Quan Jackson 41-yard pass from Michael Pratt (Merek Glover kick) (6 plays, 60 yards, 2:04)	NEV 19–7
2	07:44	NEV	Toa Taua 50-yard rush (two-point pass conversion attempt failed) (8 plays, 82 yards, 2:54)	NEV 26–7
3	10:03	TULN	Michael Pratt 6-yard rush (Merek Glover kick) (12 plays, 75 yards, 4:57)	NEV 26–13
3	06:30	TULN	Jha'Quan Jackson 28-yard pass from Michael Pratt (Merek Glover kick) (4 plays, 45 yards, 1:16)	NEV 26–20
4	13:22	NEV	Cole Turner 2-yard pass from Carson Strong (two-point pass conversion attempt failed) (3 plays, 20 yards, 1:21)	NEV 32–20
4	04:19	NEV	Jamaal Bell 21-yard pass from Carson Strong (Brandon Talton PAT failed) (6 plays, 87 yards, 2:21)	NEV 38–20
4	00:07	TULN	Cameron Carroll 65-yard rush (Merek Glover kick) (1 play, 80 yards, 0:10)	NEV 38–27

Statistics	Tulane	Nevada
First downs	18	21
Total yards	365	480
Rushing yards	197	209
Passing yards	168	271
Turnovers	3	0
Time of possession	23:50	36:10

Team	Category	Player	Statistics
Tulane	Passing	Michael Pratt	12/25, 168 yards, 2 TDs, 3 INTs
Tulane	Rushing	Cameron Carroll	10 carries, 120 yards, 1 TD
Tulane	Receiving	Jha'Quan Jackson	2 receptions, 69 yards, 2 TDs
Nevada	Passing	Carson Strong	22/28, 271 yards, 5 TDs
Nevada	Rushing	Devonte Lee	18 carries, 105 yards
Nevada	Receiving	Toa Taua	6 receptions, 77 yards, 1 TD

== Rankings ==
Ranking movements Legend: — = Not ranked RV = Received votes
	Week															
Poll	Pre	1	2	3	4	5	6	7	8	9	10	11	12	13	14	Final
AP	—	—*	—													
Coaches	RV	RV*	RV													
CFP	Not released															Not released

== Players drafted into the NFL ==
Round	Pick	Player	Position	NFL club
4	111	Cameron Sample	DE	Cincinnati Bengals
