= Harvey Murphy (American football) =

American football player (1915–1992)

- Harvey Murphy, 1945

Profile
- Position: End

Personal information
- Born: August 24, 1915; Richton, Mississippi, U.S.
- Died: May 25, 1992 (aged 76); Harvey, Louisiana, U.S.
- Listed height: 5 ft 10 in (1.78 m)
- Listed weight: 194 lb (88 kg)

Career information
- High school: Forest Co. (MS)
- College: Ole Miss

Career history
- Cleveland Rams (1940)
- Stats at Pro Football Reference

Harvey Allen "Ham" Murphy Jr. (August 24, 1915 – May 25, 1992) was an American football end. He played college football for Ole Miss from 1937 to 1939 and professional football for the Cleveland Rams in 1940.

== Early life ==
Murphy was born in 1915 at Richton, Mississippi. He attended Hattiesburg High School in Hattiesburg, Mississippi. He was selected to the all-southern high school football team in 1935.

== Ole Miss ==
Murphy enrolled at the University of Mississippi in 1936 and played college football for Ole Miss from 1937 to 1939. He moved to left end after the death of his close friend and roommate Jesse Ward.

Murphy also competed in the discus throw for Ole Miss.

== Professional football ==
In June 1940, Murphy signed a contract to play professional football in the National Football League (NFL) for the Cleveland Rams. He appeared in two NFL games as an end for the Rams during the 1940 season. He was released by the Rams on October 22, 1940.

== Later life ==
Murphy served in the Navy during World War II. He later worked as a Mississippi state trooper. He died in 1992 at age 76.
