= Duece Watts =

American football player (born 1999)

Profile
- Position: Wide receiver

Personal information
- Born: December 23, 1999 (age 26); Chicago, Illinois, U.S.
- Listed height: 6 ft 1 in (1.85 m)
- Listed weight: 196 lb (89 kg)

Career information
- High school: Petal (Petal, Mississippi)
- College: Jones College (2018–2019); Tulane (2020–2022)
- NFL draft: 2023: undrafted

Career history
- Green Bay Packers (2023)*; Pittsburgh Steelers (2023–2024)*; BC Lions (2024)*
- * Offseason or practice squad member only
- Stats at Pro Football Reference

Natorian "Duece" Watts (born December 23, 1999) is an American professional football wide receiver. He played college football for the Jones College Bobcats and Tulane Green Wave.

== Early life ==
Watts was born in Chicago, Illinois, but moved to Richton, Mississippi at the age of four. He initially attended Richton High School, where he played football with his twin brother Nataurean “Phat” Watts. After their sophomore year, Watts and his brother transferred to Petal High School where he played with future Tulane teammate Stephon Huderson. Over his high school career, Watts played in 47 games and amassed 55 yards on 9 carries, 2,346 and 28 touchdowns on 119 receptions, 72 total tackles, and 1 interception.

== College career ==
=== Jones College ===
Watts was rated as a 2-star recruit leaving high school. After graduating, Watts began his collegiate career at Jones County Junior College. At Jones, he played with Tulane linebacker Nick Anderson. He played for a total of 22 games across the 2018 and 2019 seasons. Throughout his time at Jones he amassed 1 rush for 13 yards, 47 receptions for 702 yards and 5 touchdowns, 7 kick returns for 196 yards, and 1 tackle.

=== Tulane ===
Watts committed to play at Tulane University for the 2020 season on June 7, 2019. During the 2020 season, Watts made an immediate impact, as he started all 12 games. He led the team in receptions, receiving yards, and average yards per catch. The next season, Watts contributed 331 yards and 3 touchdown on 21 receptions. During his senior season, Watts had 33 receptions for 657 yards and 8 touchdown. Watts then caught 2 passes for 83 yards to help the Green Wave to a Cotton Bowl victory over reigning Heisman Trophy winner Caleb Williams and the USC Trojans.

=== College statistics ===
Year	Team	GP	Receiving					Rushing					Returning					Tackles		
Year	Team	GP	Rec	Yds	Avg	Lng	TD	Att	Yds	Avg	Lng	TD	Ret	Yds	Avg	Lng	TD	Solo	Ast	Tot
2018	Jones College	12	23	286	12.4	59	3	0	0	0	0	0	0	0	0	0	0	1	0	1
2019	Jones College	10	24	416	17.3	55	2	1	13	13	13	0	7	209	29.9	43	0	0	0	0
2020	Tulane	12	31	512	16.5	52	6	1	2	2	2	0	0	0	0	0	0	0	0	0
2021	Tulane	12	21	331	15.8	47	3	0	0	0	0	0	0	0	0	0	0	0	0	0
2022	Tulane	13	29	564	19.4	73	7	1	1	1	1	0	0	0	0	0	0	1	0	1
NJCAA career		22	47	702	14.9	59	5	1	13	13	13	0	7	209	29.9	43	0	1	0	1
FBS career		37	81	1407	17.4	73	16	2	3	1.5	3	0	0	0	0	0	0	1	0	1
Career		59	128	2109	16.5	73	21	3	16	5.3	13	0	7	209	29.9	43	0	2	0	2

== Professional career ==
Pre-draft measurables
Height	Weight	Arm length	Hand span	40-yard dash	10-yard split	20-yard split	20-yard shuttle	Three-cone drill	Vertical jump	Broad jump	Bench press
6 ft 1 1/4 in (1.86 m)	196 lb (89 kg)	32 1/4 in (0.82 m)	10 1/8 in (0.26 m)	4.59 s	1.47 s	2.65 s	4.41 s	7.27 s	37.5 in (0.95 m)	10 ft 5 in (3.18 m)	17 reps
All values from Pro Day

=== Green Bay Packers ===
After going undrafted at the 2023 NFL draft, Watts was signed by the Green Bay Packers on May 1, 2023. He was waived on August 29, 2023.

=== Pittsburgh Steelers ===
Watts was signed to the Pittsburgh Steelers practice squad on September 20, 2023. On January 17, 2024, he signed a reserve/futures contract with the Steelers. He was waived on August 27, 2024.

=== BC Lions ===
Watts was signed to the practice roster of the BC Lions of the Canadian Football League on September 23, 2024. He was released on November 22, 2024.
