= Petal School District =

School district in Mississippi, U.S.

Coordinates: 31.347389°N 89.261470°W

Location
- Petal, MS

District information
- Type: Public
- Grades: K-12
- Established: 1976
- Superintendent: Dr. Matthew Dillon
- Asst. superintendent(s): Dr. Kelli Brown Dr. Rob Knight
- Accreditation: Blue Ribbon: (Petal High School); 2007; 2022

Students and staff
- District mascot: Big Red (Panther)
- Colors: Red & White

Other information
- Schedule: Office hours 7:30 am - 4:30 pm Elementary Schools 7:30 am - 2:55 pm Secondary Schools 8:30 am - 3:55 pm
- Website: www.petalschools.com

The Petal School District is a public school district based in Petal, Mississippi (USA). In 1976, the Petal Schools District was formed after the community decided that it wanted the local school system to be separate from the county school system.

It includes Petal and the Forrest County portion of Eastabuchie.

== Schools ==
- Petal High School (Grades 9–12)
- Petal Middle School (Grades 7–8)
- Petal Upper Elementary School (formerly W.L. Smith) (Grades 5–6)
- Petal Elementary School (Grades 3–4)
- Petal Primary School (Grades K-2)

== Demographics ==
=== Previous school years ===
| School Year | Enrollment | Gender Makeup | | Racial Makeup | | | | |
| School Year | Enrollment | Female | Male | Asian | African American | Hispanic | Native American | White |
|---|---|---|---|---|---|---|---|---|
| 2006-07 | 3,872 | 48% | 52% | * | 12.89% | 1.55% | * | 84.89% |
| 2005-06 | 3,806 | 49% | 51% | 0.50% | 12.14% | 1.21% | 0.08% | 86.07% |
| 2004-05 | 3,697 | 50% | 50% | 0.43% | 11.14% | 1.00% | 0.16% | 87.26% |
| 2003-04 | 3,701 | 50% | 50% | 0.32% | 11.46% | 0.92% | 0.19% | 87.11% |
| 2002-03 | 3,679 | 49% | 51% | 0.16% | 11.42% | 0.71% | 0.19% | 87.52% |

Recent school years

| School Year | Enrollment | Gender Makeup | | Racial Makeup | | | | |
| School Year | Enrollment | Female | Male | Asian | African American | Hispanic | Native American | White |
|---|---|---|---|---|---|---|---|---|
| 2022-23 | 4,392 | 48% | 52% | 0.59% | 17.67% | 5.60% | * | 69.72% |
| 2021-22 | 4,264 | 49% | 51% | 0.54% | 17.14% | 5.21% | * | 71.34% |
| 2020-21 | 4,106 | 49% | 51% | * | 16.98% | 5.28% | * | 71.89% |
| 2019-20 | 4,169 | 49% | 51% | 0.86% | 17.74% | 5.09% | * | 72.85% |

== Promotion/Retention Rate ==
=== Recent school years ===
| School Year | Class Size | % Promotion | # Retention | % Retention |
| 2022-23 | 2977 | 96.6% | 102 | 3.4% |
|---|---|---|---|---|
| 2021-22 | 2970 | 95.9 | 121 | 4.1% |
| 2020-21 | 2893 | 96.4% | 109 | 3.7% |
| 2019-20 | N/A | 96.0% | 116 | 4.0% |

== Accountability statistics ==
| | 2006-07 | 2005-06 | 2004-05 | 2003-04 | 2002-03 |
|---|---|---|---|---|---|
| District Accreditation Status | Accredited | Accredited | Accredited | Accredited | Accredited |
School Performance Classifications
| Level 5 (Superior Performing) Schools | 3 | 3 | 3 | 3 | 3 |
| Level 4 (Exemplary) Schools | 0 | 0 | 0 | 0 | 0 |
| Level 3 (Successful) Schools | 0 | 0 | 0 | 0 | 0 |
| Level 2 (Under Performing) Schools | 0 | 0 | 0 | 0 | 0 |
| Level 1 (Low Performing) Schools | 0 | 0 | 0 | 0 | 0 |
| Not Assigned | 1 | 1 | 1 | 1 | 1 |

== Notable alumni ==
- Ralph Dunagin (1955), cartoonist
- Ray Perkins (1959), NFL running back and coach, Super Bowl V champion
- Tom Walters (1960), NFL safety
- Richard Gerald Jordan (1964), death row inmate
- Tom King (1965), politician, former member of the Mississippi Legislature
- Nate Rolison (1995), MLB first baseman
- Anthony Alford (2012), MLB outfielder
- Demarcus Evans (2015), MLB pitcher
- Javon Patterson (2015), NFL center
- Phat Watts (2018), wide receiver for the Tulane Green Wave
- Duece Watts (2018), CFL wide receiver
- DeCarlos Nicholson (2020), cornerback for the USC Trojans

== See also ==
- List of school districts in Mississippi
