= Richton, Mississippi =

- Town
- Location of Richton, Mississippi

- Location in the United States
- Coordinates: 31°20′58″N 88°56′19″W
- Country: United States
- State: Mississippi
- County: Perry

Area
  - Total: 2.29 sq mi (5.94 km^{2})
  - Land: 2.29 sq mi (5.94 km^{2})
  - Water: 0 sq mi (0.00 km^{2})
- Elevation: 174 ft (53 m)

Population (2020)
  - Total: 920
  - Density: 401.1/sq mi (154.86/km^{2})
- Time zone: UTC-6 (Central (CST))
  - Summer (DST): UTC-5 (CDT)
- ZIP code: 39476
- Area code: 601
- FIPS code: 28-62480
- GNIS feature ID: 0676647

Richton is a town in Perry County, Mississippi, United States. It is part of the Hattiesburg, Mississippi Metropolitan Statistical Area. As of the 2020 census, Richton had a population of 920.

== Geography ==
According to the United States Census Bureau, the town has a total area of 2.3 square miles (6.0 km^{2}), all land.

== Demographics ==
Historical population
Census	Pop.	Note	%±
1910	1,250		—
1920	1,363		9.0%
1930	950		−30.3%
1940	936		−1.5%
1950	1,158		23.7%
1960	1,089		−6.0%
1970	1,110		1.9%
1980	1,205		8.6%
1990	1,034		−14.2%
2000	1,038		0.4%
2010	1,068		2.9%
2020	920		−13.9%
U.S. Decennial Census

=== 2020 census ===
Richton racial composition
Race	Num.	Perc.
White (non-Hispanic)	608	66.09%
Black or African American (non-Hispanic)	265	28.8%
Asian	2	0.22%
Other/Mixed	29	3.15%
Hispanic or Latino	16	1.74%

As of the 2020 United States census, there were 920 people, 345 households, and 205 families residing in the town.

=== 2000 census ===
As of the census of 2000, there were 1,038 people, 397 households, and 258 families residing in the town. The population density was 452.6 inhabitants per square mile (174.7/km^{2}). There were 497 housing units at an average density of 216.7 per square mile (83.7/km^{2}). The racial makeup of the town was 76.01% White, 21.19% African American, 0.67% Native American, 0.19% Asian, 0.48% Pacific Islander, 0.48% from other races, and 0.96% from two or more races. Hispanic or Latino of any race were 0.96% of the population.

There were 397 households, out of which 29.7% had children under the age of 18 living with them, 42.6% were married couples living together, 18.9% had a female householder with no husband present, and 34.8% were non-families. 32.0% of all households were made up of individuals, and 15.1% had someone living alone who was 65 years of age or older. The average household size was 2.41 and the average family size was 3.04.

In the town, the population was spread out, with 24.7% under the age of 18, 7.8% from 18 to 24, 21.9% from 25 to 44, 25.2% from 45 to 64, and 20.4% who were 65 years of age or older. The median age was 41 years. For every 100 females, there were 75.3 males. For every 100 females age 18 and over, there were 68.5 males.

The median income for a household in the town was $23,365, and the median income for a family was $33,250. Males had a median income of $34,250 versus $16,000 for females. The per capita income for the town was $17,425. About 22.3% of families and 31.9% of the population were below the poverty line, including 47.7% of those under age 18 and 26.5% of those age 65 or over.

== Education ==
The Town of Richton is served by the Richton School District.

The county is in the zone for Jones College.

== Strategic Petroleum Reserve ==
The United States Department of Energy has selected Richton as a possible site for the expansion of the Strategic Petroleum Reserve.

== Notable people ==
- Roy Cochran, Olympic athlete
- Glenda Meadows Grubbs, former Miss Mississippi, artist
- George E. Johnson, Sr., entrepreneur
- JaCoby Jones, baseball player
- Harvey Murphy, former National Football League player
- Frank Stanford, poet
- Duece Watts, former NFL and current Canadian Football League wide receiver
- Phat Watts, college football wide receiver
