= Michael Pratt (American football) =

American football quarterback (born 2001)

Profile
- Position: Quarterback

Personal information
- Born: September 30, 2001 (age 25); Miami, Florida, U.S.
- Listed height: 6 ft 2 in (1.88 m)
- Listed weight: 217 lb (98 kg)

Career information
- High school: Deerfield Beach (Deerfield Beach, Florida)
- College: Tulane (2020–2023)
- NFL draft: 2024: 7th round, 245th overall pick

Career history
- Green Bay Packers (2024)*; Tampa Bay Buccaneers (2024)*; St. Louis Battlehawks (2026)
- * Offseason or practice squad member only

Awards and highlights
- American Athletic Conference Football Championship Game MVP (2022); AAC Offensive Player of the Year (2023); First-team All-AAC (2023); Second-team All-AAC (2022)
- Stats at Pro Football Reference

Michael Wayne Pratt (born September 30, 2001) is an American professional football quarterback. He played college football for the Tulane Green Wave, where he was named the 2023 AAC Offensive Player of the Year. Pratt was selected by the Green Bay Packers in the seventh round of the 2024 NFL draft.

== Early life ==
Pratt was born in Miami, Florida, grew up in Boca Raton, Florida and was home schooled until the ninth grade. He initially attended Boca Raton High School, where he joined the football team as a freshman after never having played the sport before. As a junior, Pratt passed for 1,208 yards and 12 touchdowns with nine interceptions while also rushing for 447 yards and three touchdowns. He transferred to Deerfield Beach High School prior to his senior year. Pratt was rated a three-star recruit and committed to play college football at Tulane.

== College career ==
Pratt became the starting quarterback for the Tulane Green Wave three games into his freshman season. He finished the year with 1,806 passing yards and 20 touchdown passes and also rushed for 229 yards and eight touchdowns. As a sophomore, Pratt completed 57.6% of his passes for 2,381 yards and 21 touchdowns with eight interceptions. He entered his junior season on the watchlist for the Maxwell Award.

Notably, during his junior season, he led the Tulane Green Wave to a 46-45 victory over Caleb Williams and the USC Trojans in the 2023 Cotton Bowl Classic.

=== Statistics ===
College statistics
Season	Games			Passing								Rushing			
Season	GP	GS	Record	Cmp	Att	Pct	Yds	Avg	TD	Int	Rtg	Att	Yds	Avg	TD
2020	10	9	4–5	140	254	55.1	1,806	7.1	20	8	134.5	115	229	2.0	8
2021	12	11	2–9	190	329	57.8	2,390	7.3	21	8	135.0	105	154	1.5	5
2022	13	13	11–2	215	338	63.6	3,009	8.9	27	5	161.8	129	478	3.7	10
2023	11	11	10–1	185	283	65.4	2,406	8.5	22	5	158.9	98	286	2.9	5
Career	46	44	27–17	730	1,204	60.6	9,611	8.0	90	26	148.0	447	1,147	2.6	28

== Professional career ==
Pre-draft measurables
Height	Weight	Arm length	Hand span	20-yard shuttle	Three-cone drill	Vertical jump	Broad jump
6 ft 2 1/2 in (1.89 m)	217 lb (98 kg)	30 3/4 in (0.78 m)	9 1/4 in (0.23 m)	4.23 s	7.20 s	36.0 in (0.91 m)	9 ft 6 in (2.90 m)
All values from NFL Combine

=== Green Bay Packers ===
Pratt was selected by the Green Bay Packers in the seventh round (245th overall) of the 2024 NFL draft. He signed his rookie contract on May 3, 2024, a 4-year term worth $4.106 million featuring an $86,940 signing bonus. Pratt was released by Green Bay on August 27.

=== Tampa Bay Buccaneers ===
On August 28, 2024, Pratt was signed to the Tampa Bay Buccaneers practice squad. He signed a reserve/future contract with Tampa Bay on January 14, 2025. On August 21, Pratt was waived by the Buccaneers with an injury settlement.

=== St. Louis Battlehawks ===
On January 12, 2026, Pratt was signed by the St. Louis Battlehawks of the United Football League (UFL). He was released by the Battlehawks on February 22 and re-signed March 18. He was released again on May 15.
