= 2021 Tulane Green Wave football team =

American college football season

2021 Tulane Green Wave football
- Conference: American Athletic Conference
- Record: 2–10 (1–7 American)
- Head coach: Willie Fritz (6th season)
- Offensive coordinator: Chip Long (1st season)
- Offensive scheme: Spread
- Defensive coordinator: Chris Hampton (1st season)
- Base defense: 4–2–5
- Home stadium: Yulman Stadium; Gaylord Family Oklahoma Memorial Stadium; Legion Field

2021 American Athletic Conference football standings
	Conf.			Overall
Team	W		L	W		L
No. 4 Cincinnati y$^	8	–	0	13	–	1
No. 17 Houston y	8	–	0	12	–	2
UCF	5	–	3	9	–	4
East Carolina	5	–	3	7	–	5
Tulsa	5	–	3	7	–	6
SMU	4	–	4	8	–	4
Memphis	3	–	5	6	–	6
Navy	3	–	5	4	–	8
Tulane	1	–	7	2	–	10
South Florida	1	–	7	2	–	10
Temple	1	–	7	3	–	9
Championship: Cincinnati 35, Houston 20
^ – College Football Playoff participant; $ – Conference champion; y – Championship game participant; Rankings from AP Poll

The 2021 Tulane Green Wave football team represented Tulane University in the 2021 NCAA Division I FBS football season. The Green Wave played their home games at Yulman Stadium in New Orleans, Louisiana, and competed in the American Athletic Conference. They were led by sixth-year head coach Willie Fritz.

== Preseason ==
=== Coaching changes ===
Prior to the Famous Idaho Potato Bowl in December 2020, offensive coordinator Will Hall accepted the head coaching role at Southern Miss. Chip Long was hired to replace Hall. On December 10, Fritz announced the firing of defensive coordinator Jack Curtis. Chris Hampton was named the new defensive coordinator on December 18.

In March 2021, it was announced that Chris Watt would be the offensive line coach for Tulane.

=== Award watch lists ===
Listed in the order that they were released

Award	Player	Position	Year
Bednarik Award	Dorian Williams	LB	JR
Doak Walker Award	Cameron Carroll	RB	SO
Rimington Trophy	Sincere Haynesworth	OL	JR
Ray Guy Award	Ryan Wright	P	SR
Paul Hornung Award	Jha'Quan Jackson	WR	JR
Wuerffel Trophy	Richard Carthon	S	SR
Manning Award	Michael Pratt	QB	SO

=== American Athletic Conference preseason media poll ===
The American Athletic Conference preseason media poll was released at the virtual media day held August 4, 2021. Cincinnati, who finished the 2020 season ranked No. 8 nationally, was tabbed as the preseason favorite in the 2021 preseason media poll.

Media poll
Predicted finish	Team	Votes (1st place)
1	Cincinnati	262 (22)
2	UCF	241 (2)
3	SMU	188
4	Houston	181
5	Memphis	168
6	Tulsa	153
7	Tulane	132
т-8	East Carolina	85
т-8	Navy	85
10	Temple	46
11	South Florida	43

== Schedule ==
Date	Time	Opponent	Site	TV	Result	Attendance
September 4	11:00 a.m.	No. 2 Oklahoma*	Gaylord Family Oklahoma Memorial Stadium; Norman, OK (Note: Originally scheduled to be played as a home game, the game against Oklahoma was moved to Norman, Oklahoma on August 30, 2021, due to safety concerns related to Hurricane Ida. Tulane remained the designated home team despite Oklahoma hosting the game.)	ABC	L 35–40	42,206
September 11	6:00 p.m.	Morgan State*	Legion Field; Birmingham, AL (Note: Originally scheduled to be played as a home game, the game against Morgan State was moved to Birmingham, Alabama on September 2, 2021, due to safety concerns related to Hurricane Ida. Tulane remained the designated home team despite the neutral site.)	ESPN+	W 69–20	2,100
September 18	7:00 p.m.	at No. 17 Ole Miss*	Vaught–Hemingway Stadium; Oxford, MS (rivalry)	ESPN2	L 21–61	54,198
September 25	7:00 p.m.	UAB*	Yulman Stadium; New Orleans, LA	ESPN+	L 21–28	16,023
October 2	2:30 p.m.	at East Carolina	Dowdy–Ficklen Stadium; Greenville, NC	ESPN+	L 29–52	33,475
October 7	6:30 p.m.	Houston	Yulman Stadium; New Orleans, LA	ESPN	L 22–40	15,026
October 21	6:30 p.m.	at No. 21 SMU	Gerald J. Ford Stadium; University Park, TX	ESPN	L 26–55	22,843
October 30	11:00 a.m.	No. 2 Cincinnati	Yulman Stadium; New Orleans, LA	ESPN2	L 12–31	17,012
November 6	3:00 p.m.	at UCF	Bounce House; Orlando, FL	ESPNU	L 10–14	41,030
November 13	3:00 p.m.	Tulsa	Yulman Stadium; New Orleans, LA	ESPNU	L 13–20 ^{OT}	22,784
November 20	11:00 a.m.	South Florida	Yulman Stadium; New Orleans, LA	ESPN+	W 45–14	14,496
November 27	6:30 p.m.	at Memphis	Liberty Bowl Memorial Stadium; Memphis, TN	ESPNU	L 28–33	27,416
*Non-conference game; Rankings from AP Poll and CFP Rankings after November 24 released prior to game; All times are in Central time

Schedule source:

== Game summaries ==
=== No. 2 Oklahoma ===
Oklahoma at Tulane

Team	1	2	3	4	Total
• No. 2 Sooners	14	23	3	0	40
Green Wave	14	0	8	13	35

- Date: September 4, 2021
- Location: Gaylord Family Oklahoma Memorial Stadium
  Norman, OK
- Game start: 11:07 a.m. EDT
- Elapsed time: 3 hours and 57 minutes
- Game attendance: 42,206
- Game weather: 88 °F (31 °C) • Weather: Sunny • Wind: SW 14 MPH
- Referee: Michael Vandervelde
- TV announcers (ABC): Dave Pasch (play–by–play), Dusty Dvoracek (analyst), and Kris Budden (sideline reporter)

Scoring summary
1	11:15	TULN	Cameron Carroll 6-yard pass from Michael Pratt (Graham Dable kick) (8 plays, 55 yards, 3:08)	TULN 7–0
1	05:59	OU	Spencer Rattler 1-yard rush (Gabe Brkic kick) (11 plays, 75 yards, 5:16)	TIE 7–7
1	04:44	TULN	Jaetavian Toles 15-yard rush (Graham Dable kick) (4 plays, 75 yards, 1:15)	TULN 14–7
1	02:38	OU	Caleb Williams 1-yard rush (Gabe Brkic kick) (5 plays, 75 yards, 2:06)	TIE 14–14
2	10:00	OU	Kennedy Brooks 1-yard rush (Gabe Brkic kick) (9 plays, 84 yards, 4:53)	OU 21–14
2	08:59	OU	Gabe Brkic 26-yard field goal (4 plays, 2 yards, 0:49)	OU 24–14
2	07:58	OU	Gabe Brkic 51-yard field goal (4 plays, 0 yards, 0:53)	OU 27–14
2	03:01	OU	Mario Williams 6-yard pass from Spencer Rattler (Gabe Brkic kick) (7 plays, 78 yards, 3:03)	OU 34–14
2	00:00	OU	Gabe Brkic 56-yard field goal (3 plays, 2 yards, 0:30)	OU 37–14
3	03:31	TULN	Michael Pratt 4-yard rush (Duece Watts two-point conversion rush) (11 plays, 42 yards, 3:44)	OU 37–22
3	01:01	OU	Gabe Brkic 55-yard field goal (7 plays, 37 yards, 2:30)	OU 40–22
4	11:28	TULN	Cameron Carroll 5-yard pass from Michael Pratt (two-point conversion rush attempt failed) (8 plays, 47 yards, 2:23)	OU 40–28
4	02:18	TULN	Will Wallace 5-yard pass from Michael Pratt (Merek Glover kick) (8 plays, 80 yards, 2:45)	OU 40–35

Line	Over/under
OU –31.5	67

Statistics	Oklahoma	Tulane
First downs	24	24
Total yards	430	396
Rushing yards	116	100
Passing yards	314	296
Turnovers	2	3
Time of possession	33:22	26:38

Team	Category	Player	Statistics
Oklahoma	Passing	Spencer Rattler	30/39, 304 yards, TD, 2 INT
Oklahoma	Rushing	Kennedy Brooks	14 rushes, 87 yards, TD
Oklahoma	Receiving	Marvin Mims	5 receptions, 117 yards
Tulane	Passing	Michael Pratt	27/44, 296 yards, 3 TD
Tulane	Rushing	Michael Pratt	15 rushes, 34 yards, TD
Tulane	Receiving	Tyrick James	6 receptions, 93 yards

=== at Ole Miss ===
Tulane Green Wave (1–1) at No. 17 Ole Miss Rebels (2–0)

Quarter	1	2	3	4	Total
Green Wave	7	14	0	0	21
No. 17 Rebels	19	21	21	0	61

at Vaught–Hemingway Stadium • Oxford, MS

- Date: Saturday, September 18, 2021
- Game time: *8:45 p.m. CST
- Game weather: Rain • Temperature: 75 °F (24 °C)
- Game attendance: 54,198
- Referee: Jason Autrey
- TV announcers (ESPN2):
  Anish Shroff (play-by-play)
  Mike Golic Jr. (color)
  Taylor McGregor (sideline)

Game information

First Quarter

- (11:27) MISS – Henry Parrish Jr. 19 yard rush, Caden Costa kick
  Ole Miss 7–0; 11 plays, 75 yards, 3:33
- (6:41) MISS – Matt Corral 9 yard rush, Caden Costa kick missed
  Ole Miss 13–0; 12 plays, 82 yards, 3:16
- (3:40) TULN – Cameron Carroll 1 yard rush, Merek Glover kick
  Ole Miss 13–7; 5 plays, 33 yards, 1:45
- (0:00) MISS – Matt Corral 15 yard rush, two-point conversion failed
  Ole Miss 19–7; 10 plays, 70 yards, 3:40

Second Quarter

- (9:30) MISS – Dontario Drummond 12 yard pass from Matt Corral, Caden Costa kick
  Ole Miss 26–7; 8 plays, 80 yards, 2:32
- (7:21) TULN – Shae Wyatt 39 yard pass from Michael Pratt, Merek Glover kick
  Ole Miss 26–14; 6 plays, 66 yards, 2:09
- (7:12) MISS – Jonathan Mingo 50 yard pass from Matt Corral, Caden Costa kick
  Ole Miss 33–14; 1 play, 50 yards, 0:09
- (2:26) MISS – Dontario Drummond 11 yard rush, Caden Costa kick
  Ole Miss 40–14; 9 plays, 61 yards, 3:30
- (0:42) TULN – Tyrick James 22 yard pass from Michael Pratt, Merek Glover kick
  Ole Miss 40–21; 6 plays, 74 yards, 1:44

Third Quarter

- (11:35) MISS – Matt Corral 15 yard rush, Caden Costa kick
  Ole Miss 47–21; 5 plays, 51 yards, 1:22
- (10:59) MISS – Matt Corral 12 yard rush, Caden Costa kick
  Ole Miss 54–21; 2 plays, 37 yards, 0:36
- (7:56) MISS – Braylon Sanders 45 yard pass from Matt Corral, Caden Costa kick
  Ole Miss 61–21; 4 plays, 75 yards, 0:51

Fourth Quarter

- No scoring plays

*Originally scheduled to kickoff at 7:00 p.m. CST but was delayed due to inclement weather.

Statistics	TULN	MISS
First downs	14	41
Total yards	305	707
Passing yards	166	335
Rushing yards	139	372
Penalties	11–109	9–65
Turnovers	1	1
Time of possession	27:43	32:17

Team	Category	Player	Statistics
Tulane	Passing	Michael Pratt	10/18, 166 yards, 2 TD
Tulane	Rushing	Devin Brumfield	9 carries, 47 yards
Tulane	Receiving	Duece Watts	2 receptions, 51 yards
Ole Miss	Passing	Matt Corral	23/31, 335 yards, 3 TD
Ole Miss	Rushing	Jerrion Ealy	15 carries, 103 yards
Ole Miss	Receiving	Jonathan Mingo	6 receptions, 136 yards, 1 TD

=== at East Carolina ===
Tulane at East Carolina

Team	1	2	3	4	Total
Green Wave	0	7	16	6	29
• Pirates	17	14	0	21	52

- Date: October 2, 2021
- Location: Dowdy–Ficklen Stadium
  Greenville, NC
- Game start: 3:30 p.m. EDT
- Elapsed time:
- Game attendance: 33,475
- Game weather: • Weather: TBD • Wind: TBD
- Referee:
- TV announcers (ESPN+): Mark Neely (play-by-play) and Barrett Brooks (analyst)

Scoring summary
1	10:49	ECU	Owen Daffer 23-yard field goal (10 plays, 70 yards, 4:11)	ECU 3–0
1	5:03	ECU	Holton Ahlers 17-yard run (Owen Daffer kick) (7 plays, 55 yards, 3:55)	ECU 10–0
1	1:21	ECU	Keaton Mitchell 68-yard run (Owen Daffer kick) (2 plays, 80 yards, 0:40)	ECU 17–0
2	13:18	ECU	Tyler Snead 53-yard pass from Holton Ahlers (Owen Daffer kick) (4 plays, 61 yards, 1:28)	ECU 24–0
2	9:38	TUL	Ygenio Booker 16-yard pass from Michael Pratt (Merek Glover kick) (10 plays, 75 yards, 3:40)	ECU 24–7
2	0:36	ECU	Rahjai Harris 3-yard pass from Holton Ahlers (Owen Daffer kick) (11 plays, 76 yards, 3:27)	ECU 31–7
3	10:43	TUL	Michael Pratt 7-yard run (Michael Pratt pass to Tyrick James for two-point conversion) (7 plays, 75 yards, 4:17)	ECU 31–15
3	3:39	TUL	Cameron Carroll 1-yard run (Michael Pratt run for two-point conversion) (10 plays, 91 yards, 3:22)	ECU 31–23
4	13:33	ECU	Rahjai Harris 1-yard run (Owen Daffer kick) (10 plays, 75 yards, 5:06)	ECU 38–23
4	8:15	ECU	Ryan Jones 14-yards pass from Mason Garcia (Owen Daffer kick) (7 plays, 30 yards, 3:51)	ECU 45–23
4	6:53	TUL	Michael Pratt 2-yard run (two-point run conversion failed) (4 plays, 75 yards, 1:22)	ECU 45–29
4	1:06	ECU	Keaton Mitchell 30-yard run 3 plays, 61 yards, 1:34)	ECU 52–29

Statistics	Tulane	East Carolina
First downs	19	25
Total yards	404	612
Rushing yards	124	310
Passing yards	280	302
Turnovers	4	0
Time of possession	25:41	34:19

Team	Category	Player	Statistics
Tulane	Passing	Michael Pratt	22/36, 268 yds, 1 TD, 3 INT
Tulane	Rushing	Cameron Carroll	9 car, 80 yds, 1 TD
Tulane	Receiving	Duece Watts	4 rec, 79 yds
East Carolina	Passing	Holton Ahlers	21/32, 288 yds, 2 TD
East Carolina	Rushing	Keaton Mitchell	15 car, 222 yds, 2 TD
East Carolina	Receiving	Tyler Snead	4 rec, 78 yds, 1 TD

=== Houston ===
Houston at Tulane

Team	1	2	3	4	Total
• Cougars	14	3	9	14	40
Green Wave	0	15	7	0	22

- Date: October 7, 2021
- Location: Yulman Stadium
  New Orleans, LA
- Game start: 6:30 p.m. CDT
- Elapsed time: 3 hours and 19 minutes
- Game attendance: 15,026
- Game weather: 83 °F (28 °C) • Weather: Mostly Sunny • Wind: NE 4 MPH
- Referee: Tim Rich
- TV announcers (ESPN): Matt Barrie (play-by-play), Roddy Jones (analyst), and Harry Lyles, Jr. (sideline)

Scoring summary
1	8:04	HOU	Christian Trahan 11-yard pass from Clayton Tune (Dalton Witherspoon kick) (11 plays, 76 yards, 5:14)	HOU 7–0
1	0:22	HOU	Jeremy Singleton 17-yard pass from Clayton Tune (Dalton Witherspoon kick) (7 plays, 64 yards, 2:58)	HOU 14–0
2	10:45	TULN	Tyrick James 13-yard pass from Michael Pratt (Christian Daniels Pass to Michael Pratt for two-point conversion) (5 plays, 73 yards, 1:53)	HOU 14–8
2	3:33	HOU	Dalton Witherspoon 46-yard field goal (7 plays, 20 yards, 2:26)	HOU 17–8
2	2:11	TULN	Tyjae Spears 39-yard run (Merek Glover kick) (6 plays, 75 yards, 1:22)	HOU 17–15
3	13:18	TULN	Will Wallace 29-yard pass from Michael Pratt (Merek Glover kick) (1 play, 29 yards, 0:08)	TULN 22–17
3	8:16	HOU	Dalton Witherspoon 24-yard field goal (5 plays, 28 yards, 1:17)	TULN 22–20
3	1:20	HOU	Jeremy Singleton 29-yard pass from Clayton Tune (Two-point pass conversion failed) (11 plays, 80 yards, 4:40)	HOU 26–22
4	9:28	HOU	Ta'Zhawn Henry 8-yard run (Dalton Witherspoon kick) (6 plays, 39 yards, 3:20)	HOU 33–22
4	1:03	HOU	Alton McCaskill 35-yard run (Dalton Witherspoon kick) (6 plays, 53 yards, 1:59)	HOU 40–22

Line	Over/under
HOU –6.5	60

Statistics	Houston	Tulane
First downs	18	17
Total yards	435	308
Rushing yards	147	94
Passing yards	288	214
Turnovers	0	1
Time of possession	31:34	28:26

Team	Category	Player	Statistics
Houston	Passing	Clayton Tune	23/36, 288 yards, 3 TDs
Houston	Rushing	Alton McCaskill	18 rushes, 93 yards, 1 TD
Houston	Receiving	KeSean Carter	6 receptions, 69 yards
Tulane	Passing	Michael Pratt	20/30, 214 yards, 2 TDs
Tulane	Rushing	Cameron Carroll	13 rushes, 68 yards
Tulane	Receiving	Will Wallace	2 receptions, 54 yards, 1 TD

=== at No. 21 SMU ===
Tulane at Southern Methodist

Team	1	2	3	4	Total
Green Wave	7	0	12	7	26
• No. 21 Mustangs	17	14	7	17	55

- Date: October 21
- Location: Gerald J. Ford Stadium
  University Park, TX
- Game start: 6:30 p.m. CDT
- Elapsed time: 3:24
- Game attendance: 22,843
- Game weather: Temperature: 79 °F (26 °C) • Weather: Sunny • Wind: NE 6 MPH
- Referee: Hank Jones
- TV announcers (ESPN): Matt Barrie (play-by-play), Roddy Jones (analyst), and Harry Lyles, Jr. (sideline)

Scoring summary
1	9:56	SMU	Blake Mazza 22-yard field goal (14 plays, 50 yards, 5:04)	SMU 3–0
1	6:08	SMU	Tre Siggers 1-yard run (Blake Mazza kick) (6 plays, 81 yards, 2:30)	SMU 10–0
1	1:04	SMU	Tanner Mordecai 1-yard run (Blake Mazza kick) (11 plays, 88 yards, 3:07)	SMU 17–0
1	0:22	TULN	Shae Wyatt 10-yard pass from Michael Pratt (Merek Glover kick) (3 plays, 75 yards, 0:42)	SMU 17–7
2	13:25	SMU	Tommy McIntyre 24-yard pass from Tanner Mordecai (Blake Mazza kick) (6 plays, 96 yards, 1:57)	SMU 24–7
2	0:53	SMU	Reggie Roberson Jr. 22-yard pass from Tanner Mordecai (Blake Mazza kick) (9 plays, 91 yards, 4:24)	SMU 31–7
3	12:18	TULN	Shae Wyatt 11-yard pass from Michael Pratt (pass failed) (7 plays, 75 yards, 2:42)	SMU 31–13
3	3:33	SMU	Tre Siggers 9-yard run (Blake Mazza kick) (11 plays, 91 yards, 5:04)	SMU 38–13
3	1:28	TULN	Duece Watts 4-yard pass from Michael Pratt (pass failed) (6 plays, 75 yards, 2:05)	SMU 38–19
4	9:05	SMU	Blake Mazza 38-yard field goal (6 plays, 13 yards, 3:56)	SMU 41–19
4	6:50	TULN	Tyjae Spears 9-yard run (Merek Glover kick) (8 plays, 82 yards, 2:15)	SMU 41–26
4	6:01	SMU	Tyler Lavine 44-yard pass from Tanner Mordecai (Blake Mazza kick) (2 plays, 44 yards, 0:49)	SMU 48–26
4	2:39	SMU	Brandon Epton Jr. 9-yard run (Blake Mazza kick) (6 plays, 37 yards, 2:47)	SMU 55–26

Statistics	TULN	SMU
First downs	18	31
Total yards	428	612
Rushing yards	194	174
Passing yards	234	438
Turnovers	1	0
Time of possession	25:37	34:23

Team	Category	Player	Statistics
Tulane	Passing	Michael Pratt	11/22, 234 yards, 3 TD
Tulane	Rushing	Tyjae Spears	14 rushes, 85 yards, TD
Tulane	Receiving	Jha'Quan Jackson	2 receptions, 93 yards
SMU	Passing	Tanner Mordecai	30/42, 427 yards, 3 TD
SMU	Rushing	Tre Siggers	15 rushes, 81 yards, 2 TD
SMU	Receiving	Danny Gray	8 receptions, 140 yards

=== No. 2 Cincinnati ===
Cincinnati at Tulane

Team	1	2	3	4	Total
• No. 2 Bearcats	7	7	7	10	31
Green Wave	0	12	0	0	12

- Date: October 30, 2021
- Location: Yulman Stadium
  New Orleans, LA
- Game start: 11:00 a.m. CDT
- Elapsed time: 3 hours and 11 minutes
- Game attendance: 17,012
- Game weather: 62 °F (17 °C) • Weather: Partly Cloudy • Wind: NW 7 MPH
- Referee: Luke Richmond
- TV announcers (ESPN2): Anish Shroff (play-by-play), Mike Golic Jr. (analyst), and Taylor McGregor (sideline)

Scoring summary
1	1:14	CIN	Josh Whyle 16-yard pass from Desmond Ridder (Christian Lowery kick) (16 plays, 99 yards, 7:25)	CIN 7–0
2	10:43	TULN	Marvin Moody 8-yard safety (0 plays, 0 yards, 0:00)	CIN 7–2
2	7:58	TULN	Tyjae Spears 47-yard run (Merek Glover kick) (6 plays, 66 yards, 2:34)	TULN 7–9
2	6:19	CIN	Jerome Ford 3-yard run (Christian Lowery kick) (5 plays, 80 yards, 1:33)	CIN 14–9
2	0:00	TULN	Merek Glover 41-yard field goal (4 plays, 26 yards, 0:30)	CIN 14–12
3	3:12	CIN	Josh Whyle 5-yard pass from Desmond Ridder (Christian Lowery kick) (13 plays, 66 yards, 5:55)	CIN 21–12
4	6:16	CIN	Christian Lowery 27-yard field goal (4 plays, 1 yard, 1:09)	CIN 24–12
4	4:13	CIN	Jerome Ford 26-yard pass from Desmond Ridder (Christian Lowery kick) (2 plays, 29 yards, 0:49)	CIN 31–12

Statistics	CIN	TULN
First downs	18	17
Total yards	351	280
Rushing yards	124	187
Passing yards	227	93
Time of possession	28:12	31:48

Team	Category	Player	Statistics
CIN	Passing	Desmond Ridder	17/27, 227 yards, 3 TD, 1 INT
CIN	Rushing	Jerome Ford	18 carries, 65 yards, 1 TD
CIN	Receiving	Josh Whyle	4 receptions, 79 yards, 2 TD
TULN	Passing	Kai Horton	7/16, 79 yards, 2 INT
TULN	Rushing	Tyjae Spears	19 carries, 106 yards, 1 TD
TULN	Receiving	Jha'Quan Jackson	3 receptions, 34 yards

=== at UCF ===
	1	2	3	4	Total
Green Wave	0	0	10	0	10
Knights	7	0	7	0	14

=== South Florida ===
South Florida at Tulane

Team	1	2	Total
Bulls			0
Green Wave			0

- Date: November 20, 2021
- Location: Yulman Stadium
  New Orleans, LA
- Game start: 11:00 a.m. CST
- Elapsed time:
- Game attendance: 14,496
- Game weather: • Weather: TBD • Wind: TBD
- Referee:
- TV announcers (ESPN+): Jack Benjamin (play-by-play) and Brian Kinchen (analyst)

Scoring summary
1
2
3
4

Over/under

Statistics	South Florida	Tulane
First downs		
Total yards		
Rushing yards		
Passing yards		
Turnovers		
Time of possession		

Team	Category	Player	Statistics
South Florida	Passing		
South Florida	Rushing		
South Florida	Receiving		
Tulane	Passing		
Tulane	Rushing		
Tulane	Receiving		

=== at Memphis ===
Tulane at Memphis

Team	1	2	3	4	Total
Green Wave	7	7	7	7	28
• Tigers	7	7	6	13	33

- Date: November 27, 2021
- Location: Liberty Bowl Memorial Stadium
  Memphis, TN
- Game start: 6:32 CST
- Elapsed time: 3 hours and 22 minutes
- Game attendance: 27,416
- Game weather: 50 °F (10 °C) • Weather: Sunny • Wind: S 9 MPH
- Referee: Tim Rich
- TV announcers (ESPNU): Tiffany Greene (play-by-play) and Jay Walker (analyst)

Scoring summary
1	8:17	TULN	Michael Pratt 14-yard run (Merek Glover kick) (12 plays, 84 yards, 5:29)	TULN 7–0
1	2:02	MEM	Gabriel Rogers 13-yard pass from Seth Henigan (David Kemp kick) (16 plays, 75 yards, 6:15)	TIED 7–7
2	12:34	TULN	Tyjae Spears 7-yard run (Merek Glover kick) (10 plays, 52 yards, 4:23)	TULN 14–7
2	10:52	MEM	Rodrigues Clark 15-yard pass from Seth Henigan (David Kemp kick) (5 plays, 72 yards, 1:37)	TIED 14–14
3	10:29	MEM	David Kemp 27-yard field goal (11 plays, 44 yards, 3:49)	MEM 17–14
3	4:38	MEM	David Kemp 40-yard field goal (8 plays, 39 yards, 2:24)	MEM 20–14
3	2:11	TULN	Tyjae Spears 2-yard run (Merek Glover kick) (6 plays, 75 yards, 2:27)	TULN 21–20
4	14:57	MEM	Asa Martin 1-yard run (Roc Taylor pass failed) (6 plays, 70 yards, 2:14)	MEM 26–21
4	13:31	MEM	Eddie Lewis 25-yard pass from Seth Henigan (David Kemp kick) (3 plays, 29 yards, 1:20)	MEM 33–21
4	1:55	TULN	Duece Watts 21-yard pass from Michael Pratt (Merek Glover kick) (8 plays, 64 yards, 2:22)	MEM 33–28

Statistics	Tulane	Memphis
First downs	25	24
Total yards	452	392
Rushing yards	305	56
Passing yards	147	336
Turnovers	4	0
Time of possession	28:58	31:02

Team	Category	Player	Statistics
Tulane	Passing	Michael Pratt	15/34, 147 yards, TD, 2 INT
Tulane	Rushing	Tyjae Spears	30 carries, 264 yards, 2 TD
Tulane	Receiving	Shae Wyatt	5 receptions, 47 yards
Memphis	Passing	Seth Henigan	27/42, 336 yards, 3 TD
Memphis	Rushing	Rodrigues Clark	11 carries, 28 yards
Memphis	Receiving	Sean Dykes	7 receptions, 89 yards
