= Jones College (Mississippi) =

Junior college in Ellisville, Mississippi, U.S.

Coordinates: 31.595255°N 89.200919°W

- Former name: Jones County Agricultural High School Jones County Junior College
- Motto: Inspiring Greatness
- Type: Public community college
- Established: September 18, 1911
- Accreditation: SACS
- Academic affiliations: Space-grant
- Endowment: $24.7 million (2025)
- President: Jesse Smith
- Location: Ellisville, Mississippi, United States
- Campus: Rural, 360 acres
- Colors: Cardinal and Gold
- Nickname: Bobcats
- Mascot: Bruiser the Bobcat
- Website: www.jcjc.edu

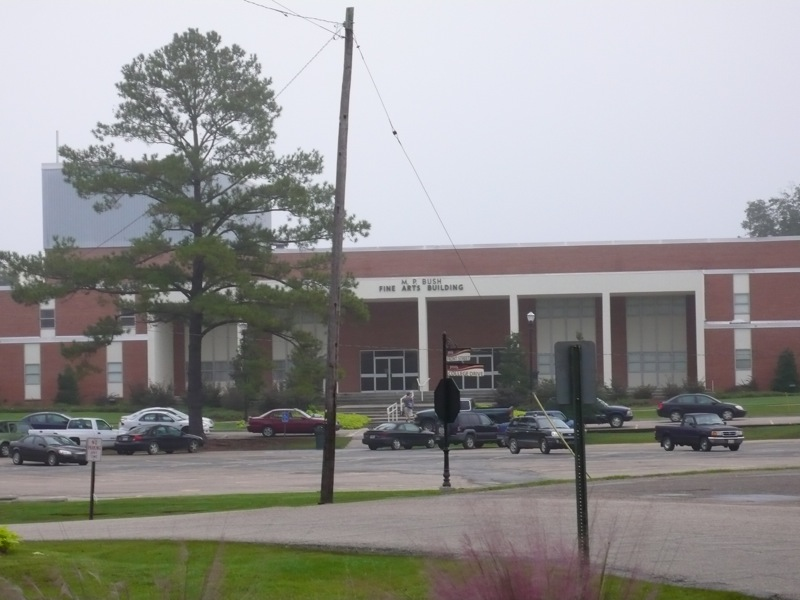
Jones County Junior College as viewed from U.S. Route 11

Jones College is a public community college in Ellisville, Mississippi. It is accredited by the Commission on Colleges of the Southern Association of Colleges and Schools and serves its eight-county district consisting of Clarke, Covington, Greene, Jasper, Jones, Perry, Smith, and Wayne Counties.

== History ==
In 1922, Mississippi allowed college courses to be included in the curriculum of agricultural high schools. The Jones County Agricultural High School became the Jones County Agricultural High School and Junior College. The Jones County Agricultural High School was founded in 1911. In September 1927, the first 26 students attended the college. The Junior College separated from the Jones County Agricultural High School in 1957.

In 2018, the college was informally rebranded as Jones College, although the school is still legally named Jones County Junior College.

== Athletics ==
Although a community college, its sports teams have achieved some notability. In 1955, the Jones County Junior College football team became the first all-white team in Mississippi to play a racially integrated team. This occurred when Jones County played in the Junior Rose Bowl, now the Pasadena Bowl, against Compton Community College in Compton, California. Jones has won three NJCAA national championships and 30 regional titles, as of 2023.

The Bobcats captured the 2013–14 NJCAA Division I Men's Basketball Championship with an 87–77 victory over Indian Hills Community College (Iowa) on March 22 at the Hutchinson Sports Arena in Hutchinson, Kansas.

The Bobcats then claimed the 2016 NJCAA Division II Baseball crown in a 7–1 win over GateWay Community College and compiled a final record of 54–9.

In 2018, the Lady Bobcats won the NJCAA Division II Softball National Championship. They swept the national tournament, winning five straight games in four days. Jones beat Potomac St. (West Virginia), 13–0 in five innings; Illinois Central College, 10–2 in six innings; LSU-Eunice, 8–7; Phoenix College, 20–1 in five innings and Phoenix again, 18–2, in the championship game.

== Notable alumni ==
=== Football ===
- Johnathan Abram, professional football player
- Stetson Bennett, professional football player
- Deion Branch, professional football player
- K. J. Cloyd, professional football player
- Javon Kinlaw, professional football player
- Ellis Lankster, professional football player
- Jackie Parker, professional football player
- Eugene Sims, professional football player
- Javon Walker, professional football player
- Damien Wilson, professional football player

=== Politics and government ===
- Chris McDaniel, attorney, talk radio host, and Mississippi state senator
- Charles W. Pickering, politician and judge
- Stacey Pickering, State Auditor of Mississippi, Mississippi State Senator, and executive director of the Mississippi Veterans Affairs Board
- Gary Staples, politician

=== Other ===
- Erin and Ben Napier, stars of the TV renovation show Home Town and namesakes of the Jones College Erin and Ben Napier School of Design and Building Arts
- Chase Sherman, professional mixed martial artist
- Red West, actor
