= Linval Joseph =

American football player (born 1988)

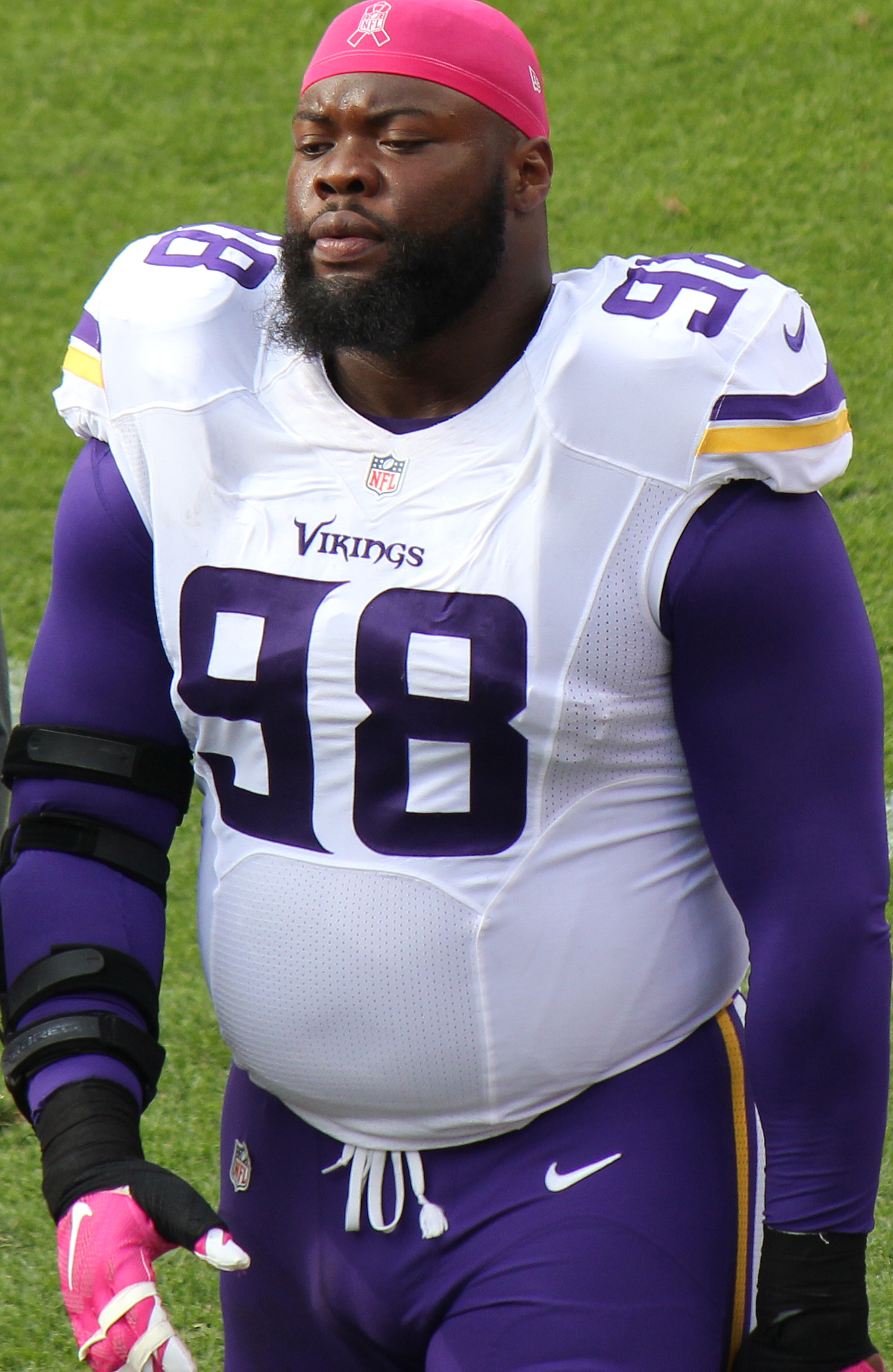
- Joseph with the Minnesota Vikings in 2015

Profile
- Position: Defensive tackle

Personal information
- Born: October 10, 1988 (age 38); Christiansted, Saint Croix, U.S. Virgin Islands
- Listed height: 6 ft 4 in (1.93 m)
- Listed weight: 328 lb (149 kg)

Career information
- High school: Santa Fe (Alachua, Florida)
- College: East Carolina (2007–2009)
- NFL draft: 2010: 2nd round, 46th overall pick

Career history
- New York Giants (2010–2013); Minnesota Vikings (2014–2019); Los Angeles Chargers (2020–2021); Philadelphia Eagles (2022); Buffalo Bills (2023); Dallas Cowboys (2024)

Awards and highlights
- Super Bowl champion (XLVI); 2× Pro Bowl (2016, 2017); First-team All-C-USA (2009)

Career NFL statistics as of 2024
- Total tackles: 695
- Sacks: 28.5
- Forced fumbles: 9
- Fumble recoveries: 5
- Pass deflections: 6
- Defensive touchdowns: 1
- Stats at Pro Football Reference

Linval Clement Joseph (born October 10, 1988) is an American professional football defensive tackle. He played college football for the East Carolina Pirates. He was selected by the New York Giants in the second round, 46th overall of the 2010 NFL draft. He has also played for the Minnesota Vikings, Los Angeles Chargers, Philadelphia Eagles, Buffalo Bills and Dallas Cowboys.

== Early life ==
Joseph was born in Saint Croix, U.S. Virgin Islands. He attended Santa Fe High School in Alachua, Florida, where he was a four-year letterman in football for the Raiders. He was a two-time All-state selection (Class AAA) as a junior and senior, as well as an All-region selection.

In addition to football, Joseph also lettered three-times in both powerlifting and track, earning a total of 10 varsity letters. In powerlifting, Joseph recorded lifts of 415 (bench press) and 560 (squat). As a junior, he captured the Florida State Bench Press Championship with 415 pounds and the Florida State Weightlifting Championship with a 320-pound clean jerk. In track & field, Joseph was one of the state's top performers in the throwing events with personal-bests of 17.13 meters (56'2.75") in the shot put and 48.41 meters (158'10") in the discus. In 2005, he captured the district and regional titles in the shot put and the discus. He advanced to the state finals in the shot put and discus as a junior and senior; in 2006, he placed 3rd in the shot put and 2nd in the discus, and as a senior, he won the state title in the shot put. He was also timed at 5.0 seconds in the 40-yard dash.

Regarded as a three-star recruit by Rivals.com, Joseph was featured in the 2007 Rivals Recruiting Yearbook. He was rated as the 44th-ranked defensive tackle nationally and 59th-ranked recruit out of the state of Florida. He was considered among the region's top prospects and among the top 500 overall prospects in the country (deemed to have pro potential and ability to make an impact on a college team). He was viewed as the 76th-ranked overall recruit in Florida by SuperPrep Magazine.

== College career ==
Joseph attended East Carolina University from 2007 to 2009. During his collegiate career, he totaled 143 tackles, including 29.5 for loss and 6.5 sacks. He was named first-team All-Conference USA (C-USA) as a junior in 2009.

=== Freshman season (2007) ===
As a true freshman, Joseph played in all 13 games with four starts, recording 40 overall total tackles (13 solo, 27 assists). His 8.5 tackles for a loss of 23 yards ranked fourth on the team, while his five quarterback hurries ranked fourth. He was part of a defensive front that held four opponents to 80 rushing yards or less. He notched his first career start against #5 West Virginia in the fourth week of the season, finishing with four total tackles. He made his collegiate debut on national television in the season opener at Virginia Tech but was not credited with any statistics in the game. His first career sack (half) came against Southern Miss for a 3-yard loss. He also recovered a fumble in that game against the Eagles. On November 10, he collected a season-high eight tackles (three solo, five assists) in the Pirates' loss at Marshall. He was named to the 2007 Conference USA All-Freshman Team by the media and coaches.

=== Sophomore season (2008) ===
As a sophomore in 2008, Joseph was among East Carolina top 10 tacklers, finishing with a total of 43 stops, with eight of those coming behind the line of scrimmage for a loss of 34 yards. He played in all 14 games and opened the last nine consecutive contests on the inside of the Pirates' defensive front. He posted six or more stops in three of the last four games and was an honorable mention All-Conference USA selection by the league coaches. He helped the Pirates' defensive unit hold three opponents to under 100 rushing yards and two opponents to less than 100 passing yards, while forcing a total of 33 turnovers that ranked seventh in the nation. He opened the year as a preseason All-Conference USA selection by analyst Phil Steele, despite missing much of fall camp due to a back injury, which came after losing +70 pounds following the 2007 campaign. He made his first start of the year against Virginia on October 11 and never left the starting lineup for the remainder of the year. On December 6, he enjoyed a career-high nine-tackle performance against Tulsa in the Conference USA Championship Game, which also included a forced fumble and a batted pass. In the third quarter, he dropped Golden Hurricane quarterback David Johnson behind the line on a rush where he forced his first career fumble on a third-and-five play. He then followed with seven stops against Kentucky in the AutoZone Liberty Bowl, a career-best three resulting in lost yardage. He was also credited with a pair of blocked extra-point attempts against the Wildcats.

=== Junior season (2009) ===
In the 2009 season, Joseph appeared in all 14 games. He recorded 60 tackles, three sacks, 13 tackles-for-loss, and one pass defended. Following his junior season in 2009, Joseph announced his intention to forgo his remaining eligibility at East Carolina and enter the 2010 NFL draft.

== Professional career ==
External videos
- Joseph performs at the NFL Combine

Pre-draft measurables
| Height | Weight | Arm length | Hand span | 40-yard dash | 10-yard split | 20-yard split | 20-yard shuttle | Three-cone drill | Vertical jump | Broad jump | Bench press |
|---|---|---|---|---|---|---|---|---|---|---|---|
| 6 ft 4 1/2 in (1.94 m) | 328 lb (149 kg) | 34 1/2 in (0.88 m) | 10 in (0.25 m) | 5.04 s | 1.74 s | 2.86 s | 4.52 s | 7.62 s | 31.5 in (0.80 m) | 8 ft 6 in (2.59 m) | 39 reps |
All values from NFL Combine and Pro Day

=== New York Giants ===
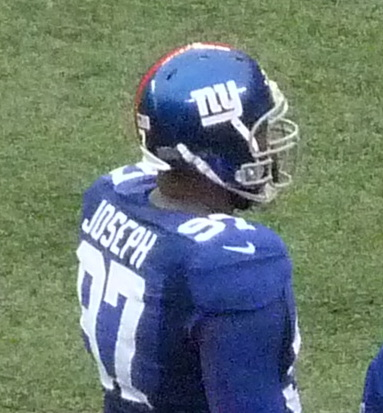
Joseph in 2012

==== 2010 season ====
Joseph was selected by the New York Giants with the 46th overall pick in the second round of the 2010 NFL draft. He signed with the Giants on July 31, 2010.

Joseph was inactive in 10 games as a rookie in 2010 and only played in six games. He played his first NFL game against the Chicago Bears in Week 4, and was credited with a tackle in the game. On December 26, he had a season-best five solo stops versus the Packers. Joseph finished his first season as a Giant with eight combined tackles, six of them solo.

==== 2011 season ====
Joseph was moved into a full-time starter role in his second year, starting 15 games and playing in all 16 contests. On October 30, he notched his first career sack on Miami Dolphins quarterback Matt Moore. In Week 13, he had a season-high nine solo tackles in the Giants' loss to the Packers.

Joseph continued to start in the playoffs and had three tackles in each of the opening two playoff games of the Giants' postseason. He followed it up with a two-tackle performance with an added pass deflection. Joseph started in Super Bowl XLVI and garnered two tackles as the Giants defeated the Patriots by a score of 21–17. On their run, they held the Atlanta Falcons, Green Bay Packers, San Francisco 49ers and New England Patriots to an average of 14 points per game.

==== 2012 season ====
On October 21 against the Washington Redskins, he forced a fumble and recovered it, helping the Giants prevail over the Redskins 27–23. In Week 8 against the Dallas Cowboys, Joseph had two sacks as his team's defense picked up a total of four sacks of Tony Romo and forcing six turnovers, as the Giants won the game 29–24. In the 2012 season, Joseph started all 16 games for the Giants for the first time in his career, recording a career-high 59 tackles that ranked fifth on the team while also posting four sacks and a forced fumble.

==== 2013 season ====
In the Giants' Week 3 loss against the Carolina Panthers, he posted a season-high eight tackles. He missed the Philadelphia Eagles game with an injury in Week 5. On December 15, he notched seven tackles and a sack against the eventual Super Bowl champion Seattle Seahawks. Joseph finished his last season as a Giant with 59 tackles, three sacks, and a forced fumble in 15 starts.

=== Minnesota Vikings ===
On March 11, 2014, Joseph signed a five-year, $31.5 million deal with the Minnesota Vikings, including a $3 million signing bonus, $12.5 million guaranteed, and an average annual salary of $6.25 million. In 2015, Joseph will earn a base salary of $3.9 million and a workout bonus of $100,000. Joseph has a cap hit of $4.6 million while his dead money value is $6.1 million.

==== 2014 season ====
Joseph was one of nine people who were shot by a gunman inside the Minneapolis nightclub 400 Soundbar on August 11, 2014. A stray bullet struck him in the calf. The Vikings characterized the injury as "minor." In Joseph's first regular season game with his new team, he was credited with five tackles and a sack in the Vikings' 34–6 victory on the road against the St. Louis Rams. Joseph finished the 2014 season with three sacks, 47 total tackles, and one pass defensed in 16 games and starts.

==== 2015 season ====
Joseph was named the NFC Defensive Player of the Week after his performance in the Vikings 21–18 overtime win over the Rams in Week 9. Joseph was credited with ten tackles (seven solo), 0.5 sacks, three tackles for loss, and two pressures in the victory. The 10 combined tackles tied for the most by a defensive tackle in a game this season. Joseph became the first Viking defensive tackle to win the award in over a decade (the last was Kevin Williams in 2004) and first Viking defender to receive the honor since linebacker Anthony Barr in 2014. He was ranked 76th by his fellow players on the NFL Top 100 Players of 2016.

==== 2016 season ====
In the Vikings' Week 1 win over the Tennessee Titans, Joseph contributed with five tackles and sacked quarterback Marcus Mariota for a 9-yard loss in the second half of the 25–16 victory. Joseph finished third on the team in total tackles with 77, tied his career high with four sacks, and added seven tackles for loss and three forced fumbles. Joseph became the fifth Vikings defensive tackle to have at least 100 tackles and 4.0 sacks in a season, joining Alan Page, James White, Charlie Johnson and Henry Thomas. On January 12, 2017, Joseph was selected to his first Pro Bowl as an injury replacement for Aaron Donald of the Los Angeles Rams, becoming the first Vikings defensive tackle to be selected since Kevin Williams in 2010.

==== 2017 season ====
On August 5, 2017, Joseph signed a four-year, $50 million contract extension with the Vikings with $31.5 million guaranteed. He started all 16 games, finishing second in the league among defensive tackles with 68 tackles. On January 22, 2018, Joseph was named to his second straight Pro Bowl. He was ranked 83rd on the NFL Top 100 Players of 2018.

==== 2018 season ====
In Week 5 against the Eagles, Joseph scored a 65-yard touchdown off a fumble recovery. This was the first touchdown of his NFL career. Joseph finished the 2018 season with 58 tackles, one sack, and one forced fumble.

==== 2019 season ====
In the 2019 season, Joseph finished with three sacks, 44 total tackles, and one forced fumble in 13 games and starts.

Joseph was released on March 13, 2020.

=== Los Angeles Chargers ===
On March 30, 2020, Joseph signed a two-year, $17 million contract with the Los Angeles Chargers. In the 2020 season, Joseph appeared in and started all 16 games. He had 62 total tackles on the year.

In the 2021 season, Joseph appeared in 14 games, of which he started 12, and had 57 total tackles and one sack.

=== Philadelphia Eagles ===
On November 16, 2022, Joseph agreed to a one-year deal with the Eagles. Joseph appeared in eight regular season games for the Eagles in the 2022 season. He had 20 total tackles and .5 sacks. During the first quarter of the 2022 season NFC Championship, Joseph recovered a key fumble forced by linebacker Haason Reddick, a play which led to significant injury of the arm of 49ers quarterback Brock Purdy. The Eagles lost Super Bowl LVII to the Kansas City Chiefs 38–35.

=== Buffalo Bills ===
On November 2, 2023, Joseph signed a one-year deal worth up to $3.72 million with the Buffalo Bills. He played in seven games and had one sack in the 2023 season.

=== Dallas Cowboys ===
On August 27, 2024, Joseph signed with the Dallas Cowboys on a one-year contract worth $2.5 million. He reunited with defensive coordinator Mike Zimmer and was acquired to bolster the run defense. He appeared in 17 games, making 20 tackles, 2 sacks, 3 quarterback pressures and one forced fumble. He was not re-signed after the season.

== Career statistics ==
=== NFL ===
Legend
| | Won the Super Bowl |
| **Bold** | Career high |

| Year | Team | Games | | Tackles | | | | | Fumbles | | | | Interceptions | | | | | |
| Year | Team | GP | GS | Cmb | Solo | Ast | Sck | Sfty | FF | FR | Yds | TD | PD | Int | Yds | Avg | Lng | TD |
|---|---|---|---|---|---|---|---|---|---|---|---|---|---|---|---|---|---|---|
| 2010 | NYG | 6 | 0 | 8 | 6 | 2 | 0.0 | — | — | — | — | — | — | — | — | — | — | — |
| 2011 | NYG | 16 | 15 | 49 | 34 | 15 | 2.0 | — | — | — | — | — | **4** | — | — | — | — | — |
| 2012 | NYG | 16 | **16** | 59 | 33 | 26 | **4.0** | — | 1 | **2** | 16 | — | — | — | — | — | — | — |
| 2013 | NYG | 15 | 15 | 59 | 34 | 25 | 3.0 | — | 1 | 1 | — | — | — | — | — | — | — | — |
| 2014 | MIN | 16 | **16** | 47 | 28 | 19 | 3.0 | — | — | — | — | — | 1 | — | — | — | — | — |
| 2015 | MIN | 12 | 12 | 56 | **42** | 14 | 0.5 | — | 1 | — | — | — | 1 | — | — | — | — | — |
| 2016 | MIN | 16 | **16** | **77** | 37 | **40** | **4.0** | — | **3** | — | — | — | — | — | — | — | — | — |
| 2017 | MIN | 16 | **16** | 68 | 40 | 28 | 3.5 | — | — | 1 | — | — | — | — | — | — | — | — |
| 2018 | MIN | 15 | 15 | 58 | 36 | 22 | 1.0 | — | 1 | 1 | **64** | **1** | — | — | — | — | — | — |
| 2019 | MIN | 13 | 13 | 44 | 26 | 18 | 3.0 | — | 1 | — | — | — | — | — | — | — | — | — |
| 2020 | LAC | 16 | **16** | 62 | 33 | 29 | 0.0 | — | — | — | — | — | — | — | — | — | — | — |
| 2021 | LAC | 14 | 12 | 57 | 30 | 27 | 1.0 | — | — | — | — | — | — | — | — | — | — | — |
| 2022 | PHI | 8 | 8 | 20 | 8 | 12 | 0.5 | — | — | — | — | — | — | — | — | — | — | — |
| 2023 | BUF | 7 | 0 | 12 | 7 | 5 | 1.0 | — | — | — | — | — | — | — | — | — | — | — |
| 2024 | DAL | **17** | 0 | 19 | 9 | 10 | 2.0 | — | 1 | — | — | — | — | — | — | — | — | — |
| Career | | 203 | 170 | 695 | 403 | 292 | 28.5 | — | 9 | 5 | 80 | 1 | 6 | 0 | 0 | 0.0 | 0 | 0 |

=== College ===
| Regular season statistics | | | | Tackles | | | | | Interceptions | | | | | | Fumbles | | |
| Season | Team | GP | GS | Comb | Total | Ast | Sck | Tfl | PDef | Int | Yds | Avg | Lng | TDs | FF | FR | FR YDS |
|---|---|---|---|---|---|---|---|---|---|---|---|---|---|---|---|---|---|
| 2007 | East Carolina | 13 | 4 | 40 | 13 | 27 | 1.0 | 8.5 | 0 | 0 | 0 | 0.0 | 0 | 0 | 0 | 0 | 0 |
| 2008 | East Carolina | 14 | 9 | 43 | 22 | 21 | 2.5 | 8.0 | 1 | 0 | 0 | 0.0 | 0 | 0 | 1 | 0 | 0 |
| 2009 | East Carolina | 14 | 14 | 60 | 22 | 38 | 3.0 | 13.0 | 1 | 0 | 0 | 0.0 | 0 | 0 | 0 | 0 | 0 |
| **Total** | | **41** | **27** | **143** | **57** | **86** | **6.5** | **29.5** | **2** | **0** | **0** | **0.0** | **0** | **0** | **1** | **0** | **0** |
