= 2007 UCF Knights football team =

American college football season

2007 UCF Knights football

C-USA champion C-USA East Division champion

C-USA Championship Game, W 44–25 vs. Tulsa

Liberty Bowl, L 3–10 vs. Mississippi State
- Conference: Conference USA
- East
- Record: 10–4 (7–1 C-USA)
- Head coach: George O'Leary (4th season)
- Offensive coordinator: Tim Salem (4th season)
- Defensive coordinator: John Skladany (1st season)
- Home stadium: Bright House Networks Stadium (Capacity: 45,323)

2007 Conference USA football standings
	Conf.			Overall
Team	W		L	W		L
East Division
UCF x$	7	–	1	10	–	4
East Carolina	6	–	2	8	–	5
Memphis	6	–	2	7	–	6
Southern Miss	5	–	3	7	–	6
Marshall	3	–	5	3	–	9
UAB	1	–	7	2	–	10
West Division
Tulsa xy	6	–	2	10	–	4
Houston x	6	–	2	8	–	5
Tulane	3	–	5	4	–	8
Rice	3	–	5	3	–	9
UTEP	2	–	6	4	–	8
SMU	0	–	8	1	–	11
Championship: UCF 44, Tulsa 25
$ – Conference champion; x – Division champion/co-champions; y – Championship game participant; Rankings from AP Poll

The 2007 UCF Knights football team represented the University of Central Florida in the 2007 NCAA Division I FBS football season. Their head coach was George O'Leary, in his fourth season with the school. The season was highlighted by the completion of their new on-campus stadium. The Knights moved out of the aging Citrus Bowl in downtown Orlando, and began playing their home games at Bright House Networks Stadium, located on the main campus of UCF in east Orlando, Florida. In addition, the team changed its nickname from "Golden Knights" back to simply "Knights." From its inception in 1979 to 1992, the football team had been known as the Knights, then used the name "Golden Knights" from 1993 until 2006.

The Knights were led on offense by quarterback Kyle Israel and Consensus All-American running back Kevin Smith. Smith rushed for 2,567 yards, a single-season school record, and just 61 yards shy of Barry Sanders' all-time NCAA record. UCF's inaugural game in their new stadium was a nationally televised contest against the No. 6 Texas Longhorns. In a back and forth game, they lost by only a field goal.

UCF went 9–3 in the regular season (7–1 in C-USA), with their only conference loss being at East Carolina. They won the C-USA Eastern Division, their second division crown in three years. They would go on to host the C-USA Championship Game for the second time. Taking revenge on Tulsa for beating them two years prior, UCF won the game 44–25, to claim their first Conference USA championship title.

UCF was invited to the Liberty Bowl to face Mississippi State. In a low-scoring game, their defense held the game close, but the offense was unable to re-fire. UCF fell by the score of 10–3.

After the conclusion of the season, Kevin Smith decided to forgo his senior season, and entered the 2008 NFL draft. He was selected with the first pick of the third round by the Detroit Lions.

== Schedule ==
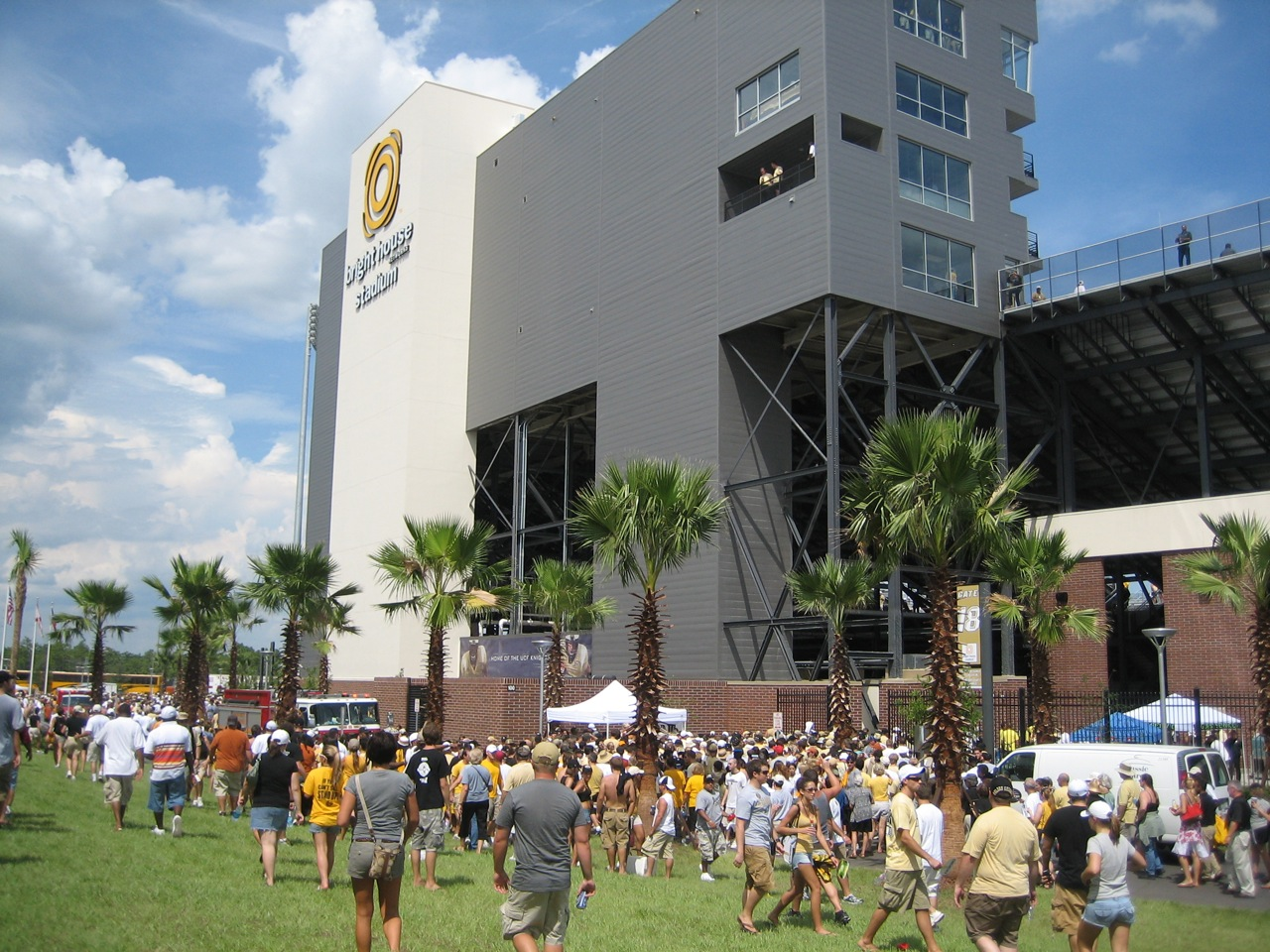
Bright House Networks Stadium, the Knights home field.

Date	Time	Opponent	Site	TV	Result	Attendance
September 1	6:00pm	at NC State*	Carter–Finley Stadium; Raleigh, NC	ESPN360	W 25–23	57,283
September 15	3:30pm	No. 6 Texas*	Bright House Networks Stadium; Orlando, FL	ESPN2	L 32–35	45,622
September 22	3:30pm	Memphis	Bright House Networks Stadium; Orlando, FL	CSS	W 56–20	42,153
September 29	6:00pm	Louisiana–Lafayette*	Bright House Networks Stadium; Orlando, FL		W 37–19	42,646
October 6	7:30pm	at East Carolina	Dowdy–Ficklen Stadium; Greenville, NC	CSTV	L 38–52	42,777
October 13	12:00pm	at No. 5 South Florida*	Raymond James Stadium; Tampa, FL (War on I–4)	ESPNU	L 12–64	65,948
October 20	4:00pm	Tulsa	Bright House Networks Stadium; Orlando, FL		W 44–23	45,510
October 28	8:00pm	at Southern Miss	M. M. Roberts Stadium; Hattiesburg, MS	ESPN	W 34–17	27,103
November 3	3:30pm	Marshall^{†}	Bright House Networks Stadium; Orlando, FL	CSS	W 47–13	46,103
November 10	7:30pm	at UAB	Legion Field; Birmingham, AL	CSTV	W 45–31	12,621
November 17	3:00pm	at SMU	Gerald J. Ford Stadium; Dallas, TX		W 49–20	10,271
November 24	12:00pm	UTEP	Bright House Networks Stadium; Orlando, FL	CSTV	W 36–20	41,967
December 1	12:00pm	Tulsa	Bright House Networks Stadium; Orlando, FL (C-USA Championship)	ESPN	W 44–25	44,128
December 29	4:30pm	Mississippi State*	Liberty Bowl Memorial Stadium; Memphis, TN (Liberty Bowl)	ESPN	L 3–10	63,816
*Non-conference game; ^{†}Homecoming; Rankings from AP Poll released prior to the game; All times are in Eastern time

== Game summaries ==
=== NC State ===
	1	2	3	4	Total
Knights	15	10	0	0	25
Wolfpack	0	3	7	13	23

The NC State Wolfpack played the Knights for the first game of the season. This is the first game where the UCF Knights played with their new logo and white helmet, and also marked UCF's first win over an ACC opponent. it was also the first win over a BCS AQ team since George O'Leary became head coach.

=== Texas ===
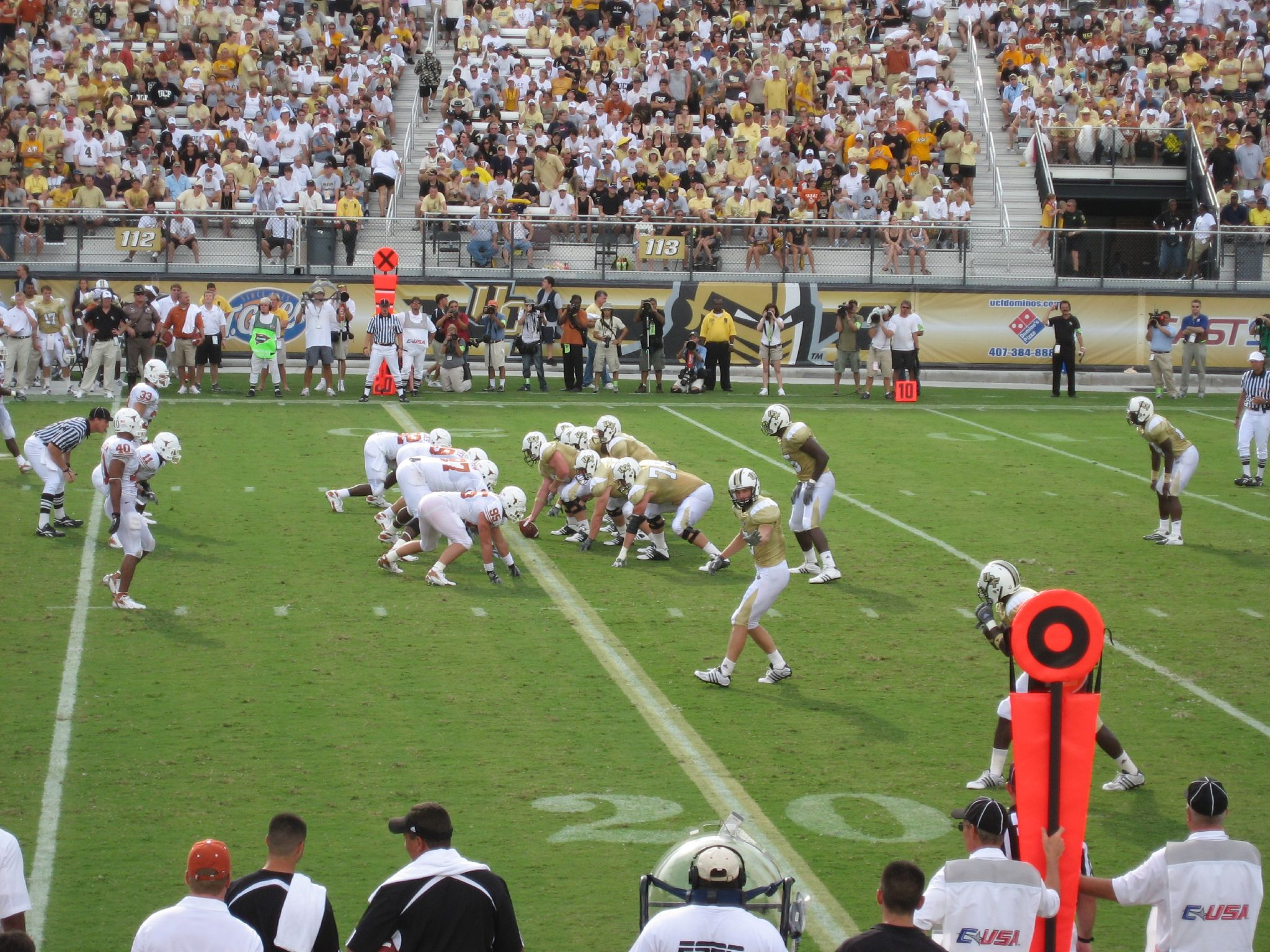
UCF on offense against Texas

	1	2	3	4	Total
#6 Longhorns	10	10	3	12	35
Knights	7	3	7	15	32

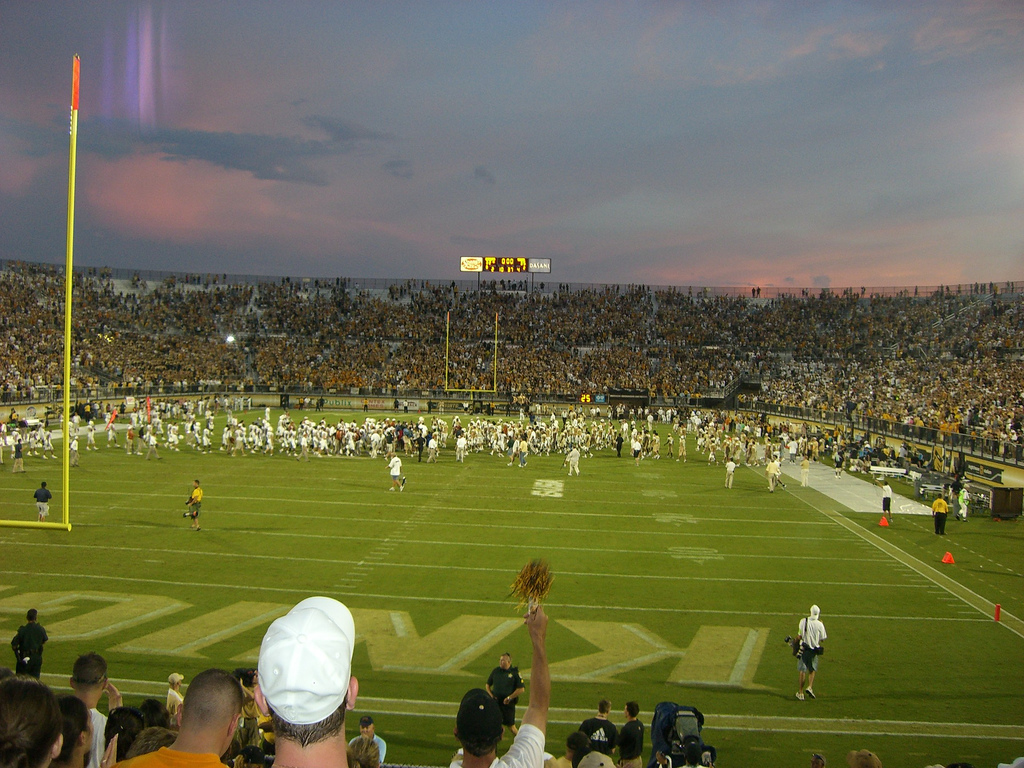
Bright House Networks Stadium at twilight.

This was the first meeting between the Texas Longhorns and the UCF Knights. Texas was the first opponent in the Knights new stadium, Bright House Networks Stadium, and the 2007 game was to be the first of three scheduled meetings between the schools.

During the game, lightning spotted near the stadium caused a fifteen‑minute delay. The game was a back-and-forth contest. Texas took an early 3-point lead and then UCF made a touchdown to go ahead 7–3. The Longhorns led 20–10 at halftime, but the Knights came back to take a 24–23 lead early in the fourth quarter. Texas then scored two field goals and a touchdown and appeared to be on the way to running out the clock before a Jamaal Charles fumble gave the Knights the ball back with about two minutes left in regulation. UCF scored a touchdown and a two-point conversion to cut Texas' lead to 35–32 with 35 seconds remaining. When the Knights were unable to recover their onside kick attempt, Texas was able to run out the clock and preserve their three-point victory.

Jamaal Charles of Texas rushed 22 times for 157 yards and UCF's Kevin Smith rushed 27 times for 150 yards. Colt McCoy completed 68% of his passes for a total of 227 yards; UCF's Kyle Israel completed 35% of his passes for a total of 133 yards.

=== Memphis ===
	1	2	3	4	Total
Tigers	0	0	6	14	20
Knights	14	28	7	7	56

This was the first Conference USA game for both teams. UCF took a strong lead early in the game, with the halftime score at 42–0, and a lead at one point of 49–0. The UCF Knights have beaten Memphis every time they have played them since joining Conference USA three years ago. During the game Kyle Israel and freshman Michael Greco were used in tandem at quarterback, and their success in the game drew immediate comparisons to Chris Leak and Tim Tebow at Florida the previous year.

=== Louisiana-Lafayette ===
	1	2	3	4	Total
Ragin' Cajuns	3	3	7	6	19
Knights	10	20	7	0	37

UCF took a commanding lead of 30-6 into halftime, but this time permitting the winless Louisiana-Lafayette team within 20 was more concerning. After the game, Coach O'Leary resolved to remind his team of the importance of playing hard all four quarters of the game, which would be important especially with two road games coming up.

=== East Carolina ===
	1	2	3	4	Total
Knights	14	14	3	7	38
Pirates	7	10	28	7	52

After going into the half up 28–17, UCF took a surprising downturn with five turnovers in the third quarter: 2 Kyle Israel interceptions, one Michael Greco interception, and two lost fumbles between Israel and running back Kevin Smith. ECU outscored UCF 28–3 in the third to take the win.

=== South Florida ===
	1	2	3	4	Total
Knights	7	3	0	2	12
#5 Bulls	12	17	14	21	64

South Florida came into the game ranked #5 in both the AP and Coaches Polls going into the game, but UCF would not hold the game as close as they did when they faced then-#6 Texas. UCF scored their only offensive points—a Kyle Israel rush for a touchdown, and a field goal—in the first half. UCF and USF would also exchange safeties, but South Florida held a commanding lead at halftime and proceeded to rout the Knights in the second half, with USF's second- and third-string QBs throwing long touchdown passes against a demoralized UCF defense en route to a 64–12 thrashing of the Knights. UCF was held to just 145 yards total offense, while South Florida used several big plays to dominate the UCF defense, advancing 543 total yards even though UCF controlled the ball for three minutes longer than South Florida.

South Florida emerged #2 in the BCS and AP Polls, and #3 in the Coaches and Harris Polls.

=== Tulsa ===
	1	2	3	4	Total
Golden Hurricane	14	3	0	6	23
Knights	7	17	7	13	44

UCF broke free of the two-game losing streak at home against the Tulsa Golden Hurricane, taking the lead in the 2nd quarter and never looking back. Kyle Israel completed 21 of 29 for 229 yards, passing and running for touchdowns, and Kevin Smith rushed for 178 yards with three running touchdowns, catching another. Michael Torres kicked three field goals.

=== Southern Miss ===
	1	2	3	4	Total
Knights	7	14	10	3	34
Golden Eagles	7	3	7	0	17

UCF's defense intercepted Southern Miss quarterback Stephen Reaves three times, and Kevin Smith ran the ball a UCF-record 43 times for 175 yards and two touchdowns. Smith reasserted himself as the nation's #2 rusher, and the Junior tailback took the school's career rushing yards record (3,372). UCF minimized its mistakes, getting through the game without turning the ball over for the first time since their first game against NC State.

=== Marshall ===
	1	2	3	4	Total
Thundering Herd	0	3	3	7	13
Knights	10	17	0	20	47

This was the Homecoming game for UCF, and was the first time that all of the Homecoming festivities, including the Homecoming parade, occurred on campus. The Knights rolled over the Herd in this game. On one series, after Marshall had punted to the UCF 1, Kevin Smith rushed for 12 yards to the UCF 13. On the next play, Smith ran up the middle, cut to his right and raced down the sideline to UCF's longest-ever run from scrimmage and a touchdown.

=== UAB ===
	1	2	3	4	Total
Knights	10	7	14	14	45
Blazers	14	3	7	7	31

UCF traveled to Birmingham and went on to defeat UAB in a hard-fought game. The 2-8 Blazers proved troublesome for the Knights, but UCF finished them off towards the end of the fourth quarter. Earlier in the day, Marshall defeated ECU giving UCF the lead in the C-USA East Division, and due to a blowout win over Houston by Tulsa, the Knights are set to host the Conference Championship at their new on-campus stadium. Kevin Smith broke more records this game. He had 320 yards, 41 carries, and 4 touchdowns. He became the state of Florida's all-time single season rushing yards leader. He won the ESPN All-America Player of the Week for his effort.

=== SMU ===
	1	2	3	4	Total
Knights	21	14	14	0	49
Mustangs	10	3	7	0	20

Khymest Williams started the game off with a 99-yard kickoff return for a touchdown for the Knights. After trading scores through the first quarter, UCF took control of the game. Kevin Smith ran in two touchdowns, and Johnell Neal intercepted a pass and ran it back 72 yards for a touchdown in the third quarter.

=== UTEP ===
	1	2	3	4	Total
Miners	0	10	7	3	20
Knights	0	16	6	14	36

Despite suffering a 100-yard interception returned for a touchdown, UCF beat UTEP 36–20. Aided by two late touchdowns, UCF sealed the victory, their sixth straight. With the win, UCF clinched the Conference USA East Division crown, and will host the 2007 C-USA Championship against West Division winner Tulsa.

Kevin Smith rushed for 219 yards, continuing to add to his historic season.

=== Conference USA Championship ===
	1	2	3	4	Total
Golden Hurricane	13	10	0	2	25
Knights	10	21	6	7	44

Tulsa and UCF met at the C-USA Championship for the second time; Tulsa beat UCF at the Florida Citrus Bowl in Downtown Orlando in 2005.

Kevin Smith continued his dominance, running for 284 yards with 4 touchdowns. Tulsa kept it close in the first half as UCF's defense seemed slow to get started. In the second half, however, they only scored on a safety. Paul Smith, the Tulsa quarterback, threw for 426 yards and three touchdowns, but also gave up three interceptions. UCF won their first ever conference title in football.

Kevin Smith finished the game with 2,448 rushing yards on the season, second all-time for single-season rushing yards in FBS history. Only Barry Sanders, who rushed for 2,628 yards in 1988 for Oklahoma State, has rushed for more yards in a single season.

=== Liberty Bowl ===
	1	2	3	4	Total
Knights	0	3	0	0	3
Bulldogs	0	3	0	7	10

With their Conference USA championship, UCF got an automatic berth at the AutoZone Liberty Bowl in Memphis, Tennessee on December 29, 2007. It was just their second ever bowl game. They faced Mississippi State from the Southeastern Conference.

After trading 2nd-quarter field goals, neither team scored again until MSU's Anthony Dixon leapt into the endzone for a one-yard touchdown run with under two minutes remaining to put Mississippi State up by the final score.

Kevin Smith tried for Barry Sanders' single-season rushing record but was shy of it by 61 yards, finishing with 119 yards rushing against MSU. He was one of only four players to rush for over 100 yards on MSU's defense all season.

== Awards and milestones ==
In addition to winning the Conference USA title, UCF and its players won several other awards. Head coach George O'Leary was named C-USA Coach of the Year for the second time. Having twice won ACC Coach of the Year, O'Leary has now been awarded coach of the year four times, trailing only South Carolina's Steve Spurrier (six) and Utah's Dennis Erickson (six) among active FBS coaches.

=== All-Conference teams ===
- C-USA First Team: Kevin Smith, Leger Douzable, Joe Burnett, Michael Buscemi
- C-USA Second Team: Josh Sitton, Kyle Smith, Keith Shologan, Sha'Reff Rashad

=== School records ===
- Best record: 9–3 (regular season), 10–4 (final including bowl game)
- Best regular season conference record: 7–1 (T–2005)

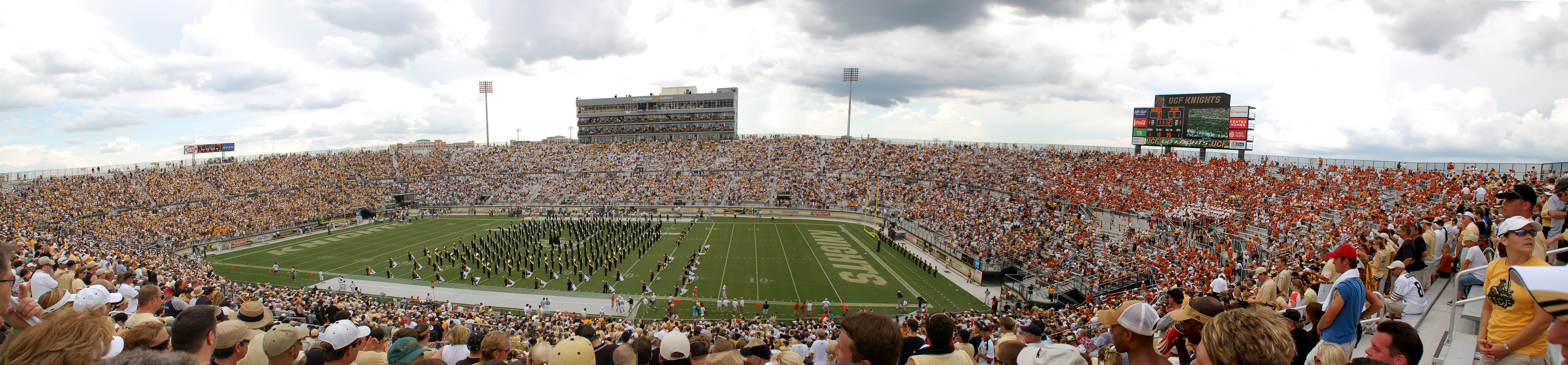
Panoramic view of Bright House Networks Stadium during its inaugural game against Texas in September 2007

== NFL draft ==
Three former players were selected in the 2008 NFL draft:

Round	Pick	Overall	Name	Position	Team
3rd	1	64th	Kevin Smith	Running back	Detroit Lions
4th	36	135th	Josh Sitton	Offensive tackle	Green Bay Packers
7th	32	239th	Michael Merritt	Tight end	Kansas City Chiefs
