= 2007 SMU Mustangs football team =

American college football season

2007 SMU Mustangs football
- Conference: Conference USA
- West Division
- Record: 1–11 (0–8 C-USA)
- Head coach: Phil Bennett (6th season)
- Offensive coordinator: Rusty Burns (4th season)
- Offensive scheme: Spread
- Defensive coordinator: Jim Gush (6th season)
- Base defense: 4–3
- Home stadium: Gerald J. Ford Stadium

2007 Conference USA football standings
	Conf.			Overall
Team	W		L	W		L
East Division
UCF x$	7	–	1	10	–	4
East Carolina	6	–	2	8	–	5
Memphis	6	–	2	7	–	6
Southern Miss	5	–	3	7	–	6
Marshall	3	–	5	3	–	9
UAB	1	–	7	2	–	10
West Division
Tulsa xy	6	–	2	10	–	4
Houston x	6	–	2	8	–	5
Tulane	3	–	5	4	–	8
Rice	3	–	5	3	–	9
UTEP	2	–	6	4	–	8
SMU	0	–	8	1	–	11
Championship: UCF 44, Tulsa 25
$ – Conference champion; x – Division champion/co-champions; y – Championship game participant; Rankings from AP Poll

The 2007 SMU Mustangs football team represented Southern Methodist University (SMU) as a member the West Division of Conference USA (C-USA) during the 2007 NCAA Division I FBS football season. Led by Phil Bennett in his sixth and final season as head coach, the Mustangs compiled an overall record of 1–11 with a mark of 0–8 in conference play, placing last of out of six teams in C-USA's West Division.

The Mustangs scored an average of 28.3 points per game (54th of 119 in FBS) while allowing 39.8 points per game (117th of 119 in FBS).

== Previous season ==
The 2006 team finished with an overall record of 6–6. The team went 4–4 in conference play, finishing in fourth place in the Conference USA's West Division. Despite being bowl eligible the Mustangs were not invited to a bowl game.

== Schedule ==
Date	Time	Opponent	Site	TV	Result	Attendance
September 3	3:00 p.m.	Texas Tech*	Gerald J. Ford Stadium; University Park, TX	ESPN	L 9–49	26,969
September 8	7:00 p.m.	North Texas*	Gerald J. Ford Stadium; University Park, TX (Safeway Bowl)		W 45–31	20,517
September 15	6:00 p.m.	at Arkansas State*	ASU Stadium; Jonesboro, AR	KTXA	L 28–45	17,465
September 22	7:30 p.m.	at TCU*	Amon G. Carter Stadium; Fort Worth, TX (rivalry)	CSTV	L 7–21	31,511
September 29	3:30 p.m.	UTEP	Gerald J. Ford Stadium; University Park, TX	CSTV	L 45–48 ^{OT}	16,464
October 13	6:30 p.m.	at Southern Miss	M. M. Roberts Stadium; Hattiesburg, MS	CSTV	L 7–28	31,253
October 20	7:00 p.m.	Tulane	Gerald J. Ford Stadium; University Park, TX	FSN	L 34–41 ^{OT}	14,901
October 27	2:00 p.m.	at Tulsa	Chapman Stadium; Tulsa, OK	KTXA	L 23–29	18,853
November 4	7:00 p.m.	at Houston	Robertson Stadium; Houston, TX (rivalry)	ESPN	L 28–38	22,774
November 10	2:00 p.m.	Rice^{†}	Gerald J. Ford Stadium; University Park, TX (rivalry)		L 42–43	13,902
November 17	2:00 p.m.	UCF	Gerald J. Ford Stadium; University Park, TX		L 20–49	10,271
November 24	1:00 p.m.	at Memphis	Liberty Bowl Memorial Stadium; Memphis, TN	KTXA	L 52–55 ^{3OT}	20,184
*Non-conference game; ^{†}Homecoming; All times are in Central time

== Roster ==
2007 SMU Mustangs football team roster
Players
Coaches
Offense

Pos.	#	Name	Class
OL	70	Kelvin Beachum	Fr
OL	79	J. T. Brooks	Fr
WR	83	Phillip Burley	So
OL	69	Calvin Crockett	So
RB	31	Travis DeJohn	Fr
WR	88	Bradley Haynes	Fr
WR	9	Jessie Henderson	Sr
WR	25	Morgan Hudnall	So
WR	25	La'Cori Johnson	Sr
OL	77	Josh LeRibeus	Fr
OL	78	Derek Lilly	Fr
OL	74	Sean Lobo	Sr
RB	20	James Mapps	Jr
TE	45	Andrew McKinney	Sr
QB	6	Michael Morse	Fr
QB	10	Daniel Miller	Fr
OL	72	Ross Nigh	Jr
WR	24	Aldrick Robinson	So
WR	17	Emmanuel Sanders	Jr
QB	12	Zach Rhodes	So
WR	16	Simeon Thomas	Fr
OL	71	Kelly Turner	Fr
QB	14	Logan Turner	Fr
QB	16	Justin Willis	So
WR	5	Zach Zimmerman	Jr

Defense

Pos.	#	Name	Class
DB	12	Derrius Bell	So
LB	54	Taylor Bon	So
LB	27	Will Bonilla	Sr
DB	23	Chris Castro	Fr
DB	35	Tim Crosby	So
DB	20	Chase Courtney	So
DB	10	Rock Dennis	Jr
DL	95	Mickey Dollens	Fr
LB	52	Pete Fleps	So
LB	29	Chase Kennemer	Jr
DL	98	Szymon Czerniak	Fr
DT	99	Serge Elizee	Sr
DB	32	K. J. Ellis	Jr
DE	96	Josh Geldert	So
DL	97	Ben Goldthorpe	Fr
DL	94	Patrick Handy	Sr
DB	7	David Haynes	Sr
DE	90	Rush Hughes	So
CB	6	Bryan McCann	Jr
LB	55	John Nwisienyi	So
LB	52	Garrett Olson	Fr
DE	93	Chris Parham	Jr
DB	13	DeMikel Shankle	Fr
DB	33	Seth Sloan	Fr
DB	18	Terrance Wilkerson	Fr
DE	48	Youri Yenga	So

Special teams

Pos.	#	Name	Class
LS	59	Sam Bennett	Jr
P, K	4	Kellis Cunningham	Jr
P	11	Andrew Galloway	Sr
P, K	15	Thomas Morstead	Sr
LS	65	Jackson Taylor	Jr

Head coach

- Phil Bennett

Coordinators/assistant coaches

- Rusty Burns
  Offensive coordinator/quarterbacks
- Jim Gush
  Defensive coordinator/secondary
- Larry Edmondson
  Wide receivers
- Clarence James Jr.
  Running backs
- Flint Risien
  Offensive tackles/Tight ends
- Eric Roark
  Defensive ends
- Joe Sawyer
  Defensive tackles
- Joe Tumpkin
  Linebackers
- Ronnie Vinklarek
  Offensive line

Legend

- (C) Team captain
- (S) Suspended
- (I) Ineligible
- Injured
- Redshirt

Roster

== Game summaries ==
=== Texas Tech ===
Texas Tech Red Raiders at SMU Mustangs – Game summary

Quarter	1	2	3	4	Total
Red Raiders	7	14	14	14	49
Mustangs	3	3	0	3	9

at Gerald J. Ford Stadium, University Park, Texas

- Date: September 3
- Game time: 3:00 p.m. CDT
- Game attendance: 26,969
- TV: ESPN
- Recap, Box score

Game information

First quarter

- TTU – Graham Harrell 1-yard run (Alex Trlica kick), 10:19. Red Raiders 7–0. Drive: 10 plays, 51 yards, 4:41.
- SMU – Thomas Morstead 36-yard field goal, 7:53. Red Raiders 7–3. Drive: 9 plays, 32 yards, 2:23.

Second quarter

- TTU – Danny Amendola 49-yard pass from Graham Harrell (Alex Trlica kick), 14:10. Red Raiders 14–3. Drive: 8 plays, 95 yards, 2:41.
- SMU – Thomas Morstead 35-yard field goal, 5:58. Red Raiders 14–6. Drive: 11 plays, 62 yards, 3:38.
- TTU – Michael Crabtree 1-yard pass from Graham Harrell (Alex Trlica kick), 0:02. Red Raiders 21–6. Drive: 13 plays, 88 yards, 5:57.

Third quarter

- TTU – Michael Crabtree 42-yard pass from Graham Harrell (Alex Trlica kick), 8:00. Red Raiders 28–6. Drive: 5 plays, 63 yards, 1:50.
- TTU – Michael Crabtree 2-yard pass from Graham Harrell (Alex Trlica kick), 1:14. Red Raiders 35–6. Drive: 7 plays, 67 yards, 1:22.

Fourth quarter

- TTU – Shannon Woods 2-yard run (Alex Trlica kick), 12:23. Red Raiders 42–6. Drive: 5 plays, 11 yards, 1:02.
- SMU – Thomas Morstead 37-yard field goal, 10:16. Red Raiders 42–9. Drive: 8 plays, 35 yards, 2:07.
- TTU – Shannon Woods 5-yard run (Alex Trlica kick), 2:01. Red Raiders 49–9. Drive: 6 plays, 35 yards, 2:28.

Top passers

- TTU – Graham Harrell – 44/59, 419 yards, 4 TD
- SMU – Justin Willis – 15/33, 138 yards, 2 INT

Top rushers

- TTU – Shannon Woods – 10 rushes, 45 yards, 2 TD
- SMU – Justin Willis – 14 rushes, 40 yards

Top receivers

- TTU – Danny Amendola – 10 receptions, 149 yards, TD
- SMU – Zack Sledge – 4 receptions, 64 yards

=== North Texas ===
North Texas Mean Green at SMU Mustangs – Game summary

Quarter	1	2	3	4	Total
Mean Green	14	0	3	14	31
Mustangs	3	14	14	14	45

at Gerald J. Ford Stadium, University Park, Texas

- Date: September 8
- Game time: 7:00 p.m CDT
- Game attendance: 20,517
- Recap, Box score

Game information

First quarter

- UNT – Brandon Jackson 4-yard pass from Danny Meager (Thomas Moreland kick), 5:18. Mean Green 7–0.
- SMU – Thomas Morstead 29-yard field goal, 1:22. Mean Green 7–3.
- UNT – Casey Fitzgerald 25-yard pass from Danny Meager (Thomas Moreland kick), 0:00. Mean Green 14–3.

Second quarter

- SMU – James Mapps 5-yard run (Thomas Morstead kick), 6:50. Mean Green 14–10.
- SMU – DeMyron Martin 1-yard run (Thomas Morstead kick), 0:00. Mustangs 17–14.

Third quarter

- SMU – Emmanuel Sanders 1-yard pass from Justin Willis (Thomas Morstead kick), 13:22. Mustangs 24–14.
- UNT – Thomas Moreland 29-yard field goal, 4:37. Mustangs 24–17.
- SMU – 29-yard run (Thomas Morstead kick), 0:00. Mustangs 31–17.

Fourth quarter

- UNT – Casey Fitzgerald 26-yard pass from Danny Meager (Thomas Moreland kick), 12:38. Mustangs 31–24.
- UNT – Micah Mosley 2-yard run (Thomas Moreland kick), 8:35. Tied 31–31.
- SMU – Zack Sledge 13-yard pass from Justin Willis (Thomas Morstead kick), 4:19. Mustangs 38–31.
- SMU – Bryce Hudman 49-yard interception return (Thomas Morstead kick), 3:39. Mustangs 45–31.

Top passers

- UNT – Danny Meager – 46/64, 602 yards, 3 TD, 3 INT
- SMU – Justin Willis – 30/42, 353 yards, 2 TD, INT

Top rushers

- UNT – Micah Mosley – 12 rushes, 39 yards, TD
- SMU – Justin Willis – 10 rushes, 82 yards

Top receivers

- UNT – Casey Fitzgerald – 18 receptions, 327 yards, 2 TD
- SMU – Devin Lowrey – 7 receptions, 160 yards

=== At Arkansas State ===
SMU Mustangs at Arkansas State Indians – Game summary

Quarter	1	2	3	4	Total
Mustangs	0	14	7	7	28
Indians	21	0	7	17	45

at ASU Stadium, Jonesboro, Arkansas

- Date: September 15
- Game time: 6:00 p.m. CDT
- Game attendance: 17,465
- TV: KTXA
- Recap, Box score

=== At TCU ===
SMU Mustangs at TCU Horned Frogs – Game summary

Quarter	1	2	3	4	Total
Mustangs	7	0	0	0	7
Horned Frogs	7	14	0	0	21

at Amon G. Carter Stadium, Fort Worth, Texas

- Date: September 22
- Game time: 7:30 p.m. CDT
- Game attendance: 31,511
- TV: CSTV
- Recap, Box score

Game information

First quarter

- SMU – DeMyron Martin 15-yard run (Thomas Morstead kick), 7:42. Mustangs 7–0. Drive: 3 plays, 76 yards, 0:44.
- TCU – Bart Johnson 17-yard punt return (Chris Manfredini kick), 4:14. Tied 7–7.

Second quarter

- TCU – Robert Henson 58-yard interception return (Chris Manfredini kick), 11:47. Horned Frogs 14–7.
- TCU – Derek Moore 15-yard pass from Marcus Jackson (Chris Manfredini kick), 3:40. Horned Frogs 21–7. Drive: 16 plays, 78 yards, 6:27.

Third quarter

- No scoring plays

Fourth quarter

- No scoring plays

Top passers

- SMU – Justin Willis – 19/34, 203 yards, INT
- TCU – Marcus Jackson – 6/12, 68 yards, TD

Top rushsers

- SMU – DeMyron Martin – 19 rushes, 100 yards, TD
- TCU – Aaron Brown – 11 rushes, 92 yards

Top receivers

- SMU – Emmanuel Sanders – 7 receptions, 98 yards
- TCU – Derek Moore – 2 receptions, 38 yards, TD

=== UTEP ===
UTEP Miners at SMU Mustangs – Game summary

Quarter	1	2	3	4	OT	Total
Miners	0	14	14	14	6	48
Mustangs	7	21	7	7	3	45

at Gerald J. Ford Stadium, University Park, Texas

- Date: September 29
- Game time: 3:30 p.m. CDT
- Game attendance: 16,464
- TV: CSTV
- Recap, Box score

=== At Southern Miss ===
SMU Mustangs at Southern Miss Golden Eagles – Game summary

Quarter	1	2	3	4	Total
Mustangs	0	0	0	7	7
Golden Eagles	0	21	0	7	28

at M. M. Roberts Stadium, Hattiesburg, Mississippi

- Date: 6:30 p.m. CDT
- Game time: October 13
- Game attendance: 31,253
- TV: CSTV
- Recap, Box score

=== Tulane ===
Tulane Green Wave at SMU Mustangs – Game summary

Quarter	1	2	3	4	OT	Total
Green Wave	0	17	10	7	7	41
Mustangs	7	10	0	17	0	34

at Gerald J. Ford Stadium, University Park, Texas

- Date: October 20
- Game time: 7:00 p.m. CDT
- Game attendance: 14,901
- TV: FSN
- Recap, Box score

=== At Tulsa ===
SMU Mustangs at Tulsa Golden Hurricane – Game summary

Quarter	1	2	3	4	Total
Mustangs	0	13	7	3	23
Golden Hurricane	0	7	7	15	29

at H. A. Chapman Stadium, Tulsa, Oklahoma

- Date: October 27
- Game time: 2:00 p.m. CDT
- Game attendance: 18,853
- TV: KTXA
- Recap, Box score

=== At Houston ===
SMU Mustangs at Houston Cougars – Game summary

Quarter	1	2	3	4	Total
Mustangs	14	0	14	0	28
Cougars	7	24	0	7	38

at Robertson Stadium, Houston, Texas

- Date: November 4
- Game time: 7:00 p.m. CST
- Game attendance: 22,774
- TV: ESPN
- Recap, Box score

=== Rice ===
Rice Owls at SMU Mustangs – Game summary

Quarter	1	2	3	4	Total
Owls	13	14	0	16	43
Mustangs	14	7	21	0	42

at Gerald J. Ford Stadium, University Park, Texas

- Date: November 10
- Game time: 2:00 p.m. CST
- Game attendance: 13,902
- Recap, Box score

=== UCF ===
UCF Knights at SMU Mustangs – Game summary

Quarter	1	2	3	4	Total
Knights	21	14	14	0	49
Mustangs	10	3	7	0	20

at Gerald J. Ford Stadium, University Park, Texas

- Date: November 17
- Game time: 2:00 p.m. CST
- Game attendance: 10,271
- Recap, Box score

=== At Memphis ===
SMU Mustangs at Memphis Tigers – Game summary

Quarter	1	2	3	4	OT	2OT	3OT	Total
Mustangs	7	21	7	7	3	7	0	52
Tigers	14	7	21	0	3	7	3	55

at Liberty Bowl Memorial Stadium, Memphis, Tennessee

- Date: November 24
- Game time: 1:00 p.m. CST
- Game attendance: 20,184
- TV: KTXA
- Recap, Box score
