= 2007 Rice Owls football team =

American college football season

2007 Rice Owls football
- Conference: Conference USA
- West
- Record: 3–9 (3–5 C-USA)
- Head coach: David Bailiff (1st season)
- Offensive coordinator: Tom Herman (1st season)
- Offensive scheme: Spread
- Defensive coordinator: Chuck Driesbach (1st season)
- Co-defensive coordinator: Craig Naivar (1st season)
- Base defense: 4–3
- Home stadium: Rice Stadium

2007 Conference USA football standings
	Conf.			Overall
Team	W		L	W		L
East Division
UCF x$	7	–	1	10	–	4
East Carolina	6	–	2	8	–	5
Memphis	6	–	2	7	–	6
Southern Miss	5	–	3	7	–	6
Marshall	3	–	5	3	–	9
UAB	1	–	7	2	–	10
West Division
Tulsa xy	6	–	2	10	–	4
Houston x	6	–	2	8	–	5
Tulane	3	–	5	4	–	8
Rice	3	–	5	3	–	9
UTEP	2	–	6	4	–	8
SMU	0	–	8	1	–	11
Championship: UCF 44, Tulsa 25
$ – Conference champion; x – Division champion/co-champions; y – Championship game participant; Rankings from AP Poll

The 2007 Rice Owls football team represented Rice University in the 2007 NCAA Division I FBS college football season. The Owls, led by 1st year head coach David Bailiff, played their home games at Rice Stadium in Houston, Texas. Rice finished the season 3–9 and 3–5 in CUSA play.

Bailiff was announced as the team's new head coach on January 19, 2007.

== Schedule ==
Date	Time	Opponent	Site	TV	Result	Attendance
September 1	7:00 pm	Nicholls State*	Rice Stadium; Houston, TX		L 14–16	11,859
September 8	6:00 pm	at Baylor*	Floyd Casey Stadium; Waco, TX		L 17–42	29,107
September 15	2:00 pm	Texas Tech*	Rice Stadium; Houston, TX	FSSW	L 24–59	21,543
September 22	6:00 pm	at No. 7 Texas*	Darrell K Royal–Texas Memorial Stadium; Austin, TX	FSN	L 14–58	84,571
October 3	7:00 pm	at Southern Miss	M. M. Roberts Stadium; Hattiesburg, MS	ESPN2	W 31–29	25,656
October 13	2:30 pm	at Houston	Robertson Stadium; Houston, TX (rivalry)	CSTV	L 48–56	26,514
October 20	2:00 pm	Memphis	Rice Stadium; Houston, TX		L 35–38	11,122
October 27	3:30 pm	at Marshall	Joan C. Edwards Stadium; Huntington, WV	CSTV	L 21–34	31,768
November 3	2:00 pm	UTEP^{†}	Rice Stadium; Houston, TX		W 56–48	12,313
November 10	2:00 pm	at SMU	Gerald J. Ford Stadium; Dallas, TX (Battle for the Mayor's Cup)		W 43–42	13,902
November 17	2:00 pm	Tulane	Rice Stadium; Houston, TX		L 31–45	11,539
November 24	2:00 pm	Tulsa	Rice Stadium; Houston, TX		L 43–48	11,742
*Non-conference game; ^{†}Homecoming; Rankings from AP Poll released prior to the game; All times are in Central time
