= 2007 Memphis Tigers football team =

American college football season

2007 Memphis Tigers football

New Orleans Bowl, L 27–44 vs. Florida Atlantic
- Conference: Conference USA
- East
- Record: 7–6 (6–2 C-USA)
- Head coach: Tommy West (7th season)
- Offensive coordinator: Clay Helton (1st season)
- Offensive scheme: Spread
- Defensive coordinator: Rick Kravitz (1st season)
- Base defense: 4–3
- Home stadium: Liberty Bowl Memorial Stadium

2007 Conference USA football standings
	Conf.			Overall
Team	W		L	W		L
East Division
UCF x$	7	–	1	10	–	4
East Carolina	6	–	2	8	–	5
Memphis	6	–	2	7	–	6
Southern Miss	5	–	3	7	–	6
Marshall	3	–	5	3	–	9
UAB	1	–	7	2	–	10
West Division
Tulsa xy	6	–	2	10	–	4
Houston x	6	–	2	8	–	5
Tulane	3	–	5	4	–	8
Rice	3	–	5	3	–	9
UTEP	2	–	6	4	–	8
SMU	0	–	8	1	–	11
Championship: UCF 44, Tulsa 25
$ – Conference champion; x – Division champion/co-champions; y – Championship game participant; Rankings from AP Poll

The 2007 Memphis Tigers football team represented the University of Memphis in the 2007 NCAA Division I FBS football season. Memphis competed as a member of the Conference USA. The team was led by head coach Tommy West. The Tigers played their home games at the Liberty Bowl Memorial Stadium. The Tigers finished the regular season with a 7–5 record, which was enough to attain bowl eligibility. Memphis accepted a bid to play against Florida Atlantic in the New Orleans Bowl, where they lost, 44–27.

== Schedule ==
Date	Time	Opponent	Site	TV	Result	Attendance
September 1	2:30 pm	Ole Miss*	Liberty Bowl Memorial Stadium; Memphis, TN (rivalry)	CSS	L 21–23	45,457
September 15	7:00 pm	Jacksonville State*	Liberty Bowl Memorial Stadium; Memphis, TN		W 35–14	28,298
September 22	2:30 pm	at UCF	Bright House Networks Stadium; Orlando, FL	CSS	L 20–56	42,153
September 27	6:00 pm	at Arkansas State*	ASU Stadium; Jonesboro, AR (Paint Bucket Bowl)		L 31–35	27,774
October 2	7:00 pm	Marshall	Liberty Bowl Memorial Stadium; Memphis, TN	ESPN2	W 24–21	25,324
October 13	7:00 pm	Middle Tennessee*	Liberty Bowl Memorial Stadium; Memphis, TN		L 7–21	30,101
October 20	2:00 pm	at Rice	Rice Stadium; Houston, TX		W 38–35	11,122
October 27	2:00 pm	at Tulane	Louisiana Superdome; New Orleans, LA		W 28–27	23,267
November 3	1:00 pm	East Carolina^{†}	Liberty Bowl Memorial Stadium; Memphis, TN	WPTY	L 40–56	27,186
November 10	3:30 pm	at Southern Miss	M. M. Roberts Stadium; Hattiesburg, MS (Black and Blue Bowl)	CSS	W 29–26	29,354
November 17	2:30 pm	UAB	Liberty Bowl Memorial Stadium; Memphis, TN (Battle for the Bones)	CSS	W 25–9	31,138
November 24	1:00 pm	SMU	Liberty Bowl Memorial Stadium; Memphis, TN	WLMT	W 55–52 ^{3OT}	20,184
December 21	7:00 pm	vs. Florida Atlantic*	Louisiana Superdome; New Orleans, LA (New Orleans Bowl)	ESPN2	L 27–44	25,146
*Non-conference game; ^{†}Homecoming; All times are in Central time
