= 2007 Tulane Green Wave football team =

American college football season

2007 Tulane Green Wave football
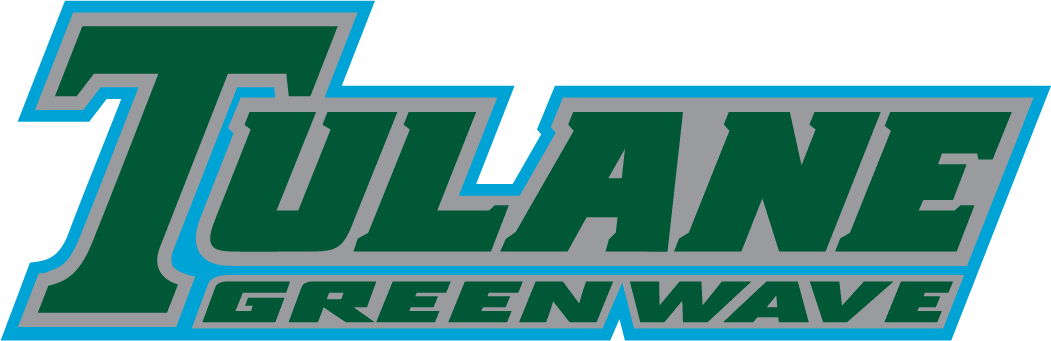
- Conference: Conference USA
- West
- Record: 4–8 (3–5 C-USA)
- Head coach: Bob Toledo (1st season)
- Offensive coordinator: Dan Dodd (1st season)
- Offensive scheme: West Coast
- Defensive coordinator: Thom Kaumeyer (1st season)
- Base defense: 4–3
- Home stadium: Louisiana Superdome

2007 Conference USA football standings
	Conf.			Overall
Team	W		L	W		L
East Division
UCF x$	7	–	1	10	–	4
East Carolina	6	–	2	8	–	5
Memphis	6	–	2	7	–	6
Southern Miss	5	–	3	7	–	6
Marshall	3	–	5	3	–	9
UAB	1	–	7	2	–	10
West Division
Tulsa xy	6	–	2	10	–	4
Houston x	6	–	2	8	–	5
Tulane	3	–	5	4	–	8
Rice	3	–	5	3	–	9
UTEP	2	–	6	4	–	8
SMU	0	–	8	1	–	11
Championship: UCF 44, Tulsa 25
$ – Conference champion; x – Division champion/co-champions; y – Championship game participant; Rankings from AP Poll

The 2007 Tulane Green Wave football team represented Tulane University in the 2007 NCAA Division I FBS football season. The Green Wave played their home games at the Louisiana Superdome. They competed in the West Division of Conference USA. The team was coached by first-year head coach Bob Toledo. The team finished the season 4–8, 3–5 in C-USA - tied for third place in the West Division.

== Schedule ==
Date	Time	Opponent	Site	TV	Result	Attendance
September 8	6:00 pm	Mississippi State*	Louisiana Superdome; New Orleans, LA	CSS	L 17–38	31,076
September 15	6:00 pm	Houston	Louisiana Superdome; New Orleans, LA		L 10–34	21,311
September 22	7:00 pm	SE Louisiana*	Louisiana Superdome; New Orleans, LA		W 35–27	17,611
September 29	11:00 am	No. 2 LSU*	Louisiana Superdome; New Orleans, LA (Battle for the Rag)	ESPN2	L 9–34	58,769
October 6	6:00 pm	at Army*	Michie Stadium; West Point, NY	ESPNU	L 17–20 ^{OT}	30,022
October 13	6:00 pm	at UAB	Legion Field; Birmingham, AL		L 21–26	24,144
October 20	7:00 pm	at SMU	Gerald J. Ford Stadium; Dallas, TX	FSSW	W 41–34 ^{OT}	14,901
October 27	2:00 pm	Memphis^{†}	Louisiana Superdome; New Orleans, LA		L 27–28	23,267
November 3	6:30 pm	Tulsa	Louisiana Superdome; New Orleans, LA	CSTV	L 25–49	15,271
November 10	6:00 pm	UTEP	Louisiana Superdome; New Orleans, LA		W 34–19	15,479
November 17	2:00 pm	at Rice	Rice Stadium; Houston, TX		W 45–31	11,539
November 24	12:00 pm	at East Carolina	Dowdy–Ficklen Stadium; Greenville, NC	MASN	L 12–35	35,362
*Non-conference game; ^{†}Homecoming; Rankings from AP Poll released prior to the game; All times are in Central time

== Personnel ==
2007 Tulane Green Wave football team roster
Players
Coaches
Offense

Pos.	#	Name	Class
RB	32	André Anderson	So
FB	36	Cody Blackwelder	Fr
WR	3	Chris Dunn	So
QB	4	Scott Elliott	Jr
RB	25	Matt Forte	Sr
OL	74	Scott Holt	Sr
QB	7	Joe Kemp	Fr
TE	80	Justin Kessler	Jr
OL	71	Troy Kropog	Jr
QB	2	Kevin Moore	Fr
QB	9	Anthony Scelfo	So
WR	82	Evan Smith	Sr
WR	13	Fred Smith	Sr

Defense

Pos.	#	Name	Class
CB	27	O'Lindsey Brown	Sr
DT	96	Tony Bryant	Fr
S	24	Chinonso Echebelem	So
LB	44	Jordan Ellis	Jr
S		Joe Goosby	Sr
S	31	Devin Holland	Fr
LB		David Kirksey	So
DE		Adam Kwentua	So
LB	34	Evan Lee	Jr
CB		Josh Lumar	Jr
DT	99	Frank Morton	Sr
DE	92	Reggie Scott	Jr
S	18	Louis Thomas	Sr
CB	8	Alex Wacha	So

Special teams

Pos.	#	Name	Class
K		Ross Thevenot	So

Head coach

- Bob Toledo

Coordinators/assistant coaches

- Jason Rollins
  (Defensive backs coach)

Legend

- (C) Team captain
- (S) Suspended
- (I) Ineligible
- Injured
- Redshirt

Roster

== Season summary ==
=== At Army ===
Tulane Green Wave (1–3) at Army Black Knights (2–3)

Quarter	1	2	3	4	OT	Total
Tulane	0	10	7	0	0	17
Army	0	7	0	10	3	20

at Michie Stadium, West Point, New York

- Date: October 6, 2007
- Game time: 8:00 p.m. EDT
- Game attendance: 30,022
- TV: ESPNU
- Box Score, Box Score

Team	Category	Player	Statistics
Tulane	Passing	Anthony Scelfo	16/25, 154 Yds
Tulane	Rushing	Matt Forte	32 Rush, 202 Yds, 2 TD
Tulane	Receiving	Jeremy Williams	4 Rec, 52 Yds
Army	Passing	Carson Williams	15/21, 113 Yds, TD
Army	Rushing	Patrick Mealy	15 Rush, 41 Yds
Army	Receiving	Mike Wright	2 Rec, 63 Yds, TD

Scoring summary

Quarter	Time	Drive			Team	Scoring information	Score	
Quarter	Time	Plays	Yards	TOP	Team	Scoring information	TUL	ARMY
2	11:28	12	80	4:58	Tulane	Matt Forte 2-yard touchdown run, Ross Thevenot kick good	7	0
2	6:39	10	60	4:40	Army	Jeremy Trimble 27-yard touchdown reception from Carson Williams, Adam Demarco kick good	7	7
2	0:19	9	40	1:41	Tulane	46-yard field goal by Ross Thevenot	10	7
3	7:48	8	90	3:50	Tulane	Matt Forte 33-yard touchdown run, Ross Thevenot kick good	17	7
4	1:40				Army	36-yard field goal by Owen Tolson	17	10
4	0:00	5	80	0:29	Army	Mike Wright 36-yard touchdown reception from Kevin Dunn, Adam Demarco kick good	17	17
OT		5	17		Army	25-yard field goal by Owen Tolson	17	20
"TOP" = time of possession. For other American football terms, see Glossary of American football.							17	20
