= Kyle Israel =

American football player (born 1985)

Kyle Israel (born August 25, 1985 in Orlando, Florida) was an American starting college football quarterback for the UCF Knights football team at the University of Central Florida. He majored in radio/television at UCF. He is a graduate of University High School. Most recently, he played for the Orlando Predators of the National Arena League. He earlier played professionally for the Dresden Monarchs in the German Football League.

== College career ==
=== 2006 ===
Israel started for the UCF as a junior in 2006; he played in nine games and threw for 1,420 yd (1,300 m)

=== 2007 ===
Israel completed 12 of 24 passing attempts as he led the 2007 UCF Knights football team to a season-opening upset of North Carolina State; the victory was the program's second victory over a BCS opponent and the first time the Knights defeated a BCS school since 2000.

On September 15, 2007, he started for the first football game held on the UCF campus in the new Bright House Networks Stadium. The game was against the number-six ranked 2007 Texas Longhorns, the highest ranked team ever faced by the Knights. Israel completed 35% of his passes for a total of 133 yd (122 m) and the Knights lost a back-and-forth game by the score of 35–32.

=== College statistics ===
Season	Team	GP	Passing						
Season	Team	GP	Cmp	Att	Pct	Yds	TD	Int	Rtg
2004	UCF	3	14	36	38.9	129	0	1	63.4
2005	UCF	1	9	17	52.9	108	1	0	125.7
2006	UCF	12	108	166	65.1	1,420	6	5	142.8
2007	UCF	14	174	298	58.4	2,173	15	11	128.9
Totals		30	305	517	59.0	3,830	22	17	128.7

== Professional career ==
=== German Football League ===
In 2009, Israel signed and played for the Dresden Monarchs, a team in the German Football League.
