= 2007 Conference USA Football Championship Game =

- Conference Championship
Tulsa Golden Hurricane	UCF Knights
(9–3)	(9–3)
25	44
Head coach: Todd Graham	Head coach: George O'Leary
	1	2	3	4	Total
Tulsa	13	10	0	2	25
UCF	10	21	6	7	44
- Date: December 1, 2007
- Season: 2007
- Stadium: Bright House Networks Stadium
- Location: Orlando, Florida
- MVP: Kevin Smith (RB, UCF)
- Favorite: UCF by 7.5
- Referee: Ed Ardito
- Attendance: 44,128

United States TV coverage
- Network: ESPN
- Announcers: Dave LaMont (play-by-play), Andre Ware (analyst) and Erin Andrews (sideline)

2007 Conference USA football standings
	Conf.			Overall
Team	W		L	W		L
East Division
UCF x$	7	–	1	10	–	4
East Carolina	6	–	2	8	–	5
Memphis	6	–	2	7	–	6
Southern Miss	5	–	3	7	–	6
Marshall	3	–	5	3	–	9
UAB	1	–	7	2	–	10
West Division
Tulsa xy	6	–	2	10	–	4
Houston x	6	–	2	8	–	5
Tulane	3	–	5	4	–	8
Rice	3	–	5	3	–	9
UTEP	2	–	6	4	–	8
SMU	0	–	8	1	–	11
Championship: UCF 44, Tulsa 25
$ – Conference champion; x – Division champion/co-champions; y – Championship game participant; Rankings from AP Poll

The 2007 Conference USA Football Championship Game was played on December 1, 2007, between the UCF Knights, the champion of C-USA's East Division, and the West Division champion, the Tulsa Golden Hurricane, at Bright House Networks Stadium (now known as Spectrum Stadium) in Orlando, Florida. The game kicked off at 12:00 pm EST and was televised by ESPN.

== Game summary ==
Under conference rules, the game was held at the home field of the team with the best record in conference play; since UCF finished C-USA play at 7–1, better than Tulsa's 6–2, the game was held at the Knights' home field.

Tulsa and UCF met at the C-USA Championship for the second time; Tulsa beat UCF at the Florida Citrus Bowl (now known as Camping World Stadium) in Downtown Orlando in 2005 by a score of 44–27.

Kevin Smith continued his dominance, running for 284 yards with 4 touchdowns. Tulsa kept it close in the first half as UCF's defense seemed slow to get started. In the second half, however, they only scored on a safety. Paul Smith, the Tulsa quarterback, threw for 426 yards and three touchdowns, but also gave up three interceptions. UCF won their first ever conference title in football.

Kevin Smith finished the game with 2,448 rushing yards on the season, second all-time for single-season rushing yards in FBS history. Only Barry Sanders, who rushed for 2,628 yards in 1989 for Oklahoma State, rushed for more yards in a single season.

== Teams ==
=== Tulsa Golden Hurricane ===
Under Head Coach Todd Graham, Tulsa finished the 2007 regular season 9–3 (6–2) with a powerful offense averaging over 41 points per game, but their defense was a struggle all season letting up 33 points per game. Their offense was mostly powered by their talented quarterback Paul Smith who had 5,065 passing yards and 47 touchdowns on the season. Current Auburn Head Coach Gus Malzahn was in his first year as Tulsa's Offensive Coordinator.

=== UCF Knights ===
UCF was led to a 9–3 regular season record with a 7–1 conference record by Head Coach George O'Leary in 2007. UCF also had a prolific offense that averaged 35.9 points per game and were led by their Running Back Kevin Smith who had one of the best seasons a college football running back has ever had, rushing a record 450 times for 2,567 yards and 30 total touchdowns. UCF did most of their damage on the ground, as quarterback Kyle Israel threw for 2,173 yards and 15 touchdowns to his 11 interceptions.

== Game Statistic Leaders ==
=== Passing Yards ===
TLSA

P. Smith28-55, 426 YDS, 3 TD, 3 INT

UCF

K. Israel6-13, 128 YDS

=== Rushing Yards ===
TLSA

T. Adams18 CAR, 41 YDS

UCF

K. Smith39 CAR, 284 YDS, 4 TD

=== Receiving Yards ===
TLSA

C. Clay6 REC, 112 YDS, 1 TD

UCF

R. Ross3 REC, 63 YDS

== Team statistics ==
Matchup	Tulsa	UCF
1st Downs	24	18
3rd down efficiency	8-21	3-10
4th down efficiency	3-5	0-0
Total yards	470	436
Passing	491	134
Comp-Att	29-57	6-13
Yards per pass	7.7	9.8
Interceptions thrown	3	0
Rushing	32	308
Rushing attempts	35	49
Yards per rush	0.9	6.3
Penalties	8-74	3-25
Turnovers	3	1
Fumbles lost	0	1
Interceptions thrown	3	0
Possession	19:40	16:14

== Scoring Summary ==
FIRST QUARTER	TLSA	UCF
FG 10:54 Michael Torres 28-yard field goal GOOD. ucf drive: 7 plays 47 yards, 02:38 ucf fg, 2:38	0	3
PUNT 7:52 Michael Such punt for 43 yards, returned by Joe Burnett for 83 yards for a TOUCHDOWN. tulsa drive: 5 plays 1 yard, 03:02 tulsa punt, 3:02	0	9
XP 9:55 Michael Torres extra point GOOD. ucf drive: 1 play 83 yards, 00:00 ucf td, 0:00	0	10
PASS 4:58 Paul Smith pass complete to Charles Clay for 22 yards for a TOUCHDOWN. tulsa drive: 7 plays 65 yards, 02:54 tulsa td, 2:54	6	10
XP 4:58 Jarod Tracy extra point GOOD. tulsa drive: 7 plays 65 yards, 02:54 tulsa td, 2:54	7	10
PASS 1:56 Paul Smith pass complete to Jacob Collums for 8 yards for a TOUCHDOWN. tulsa drive: 5 plays 48 yards, 00:56 tulsa td, 0:56	13	10
SECOND QUARTER	TLSA	UCF
RUSH 13:18 Kevin Smith rush for 3 yards for a TOUCHDOWN. ucf drive: 8 plays 69 yards, 03:38 ucf td, 3:38	13	16
XP 13:18 Michael Torres extra point GOOD. ucf drive: 8 plays 69 yards, 03:38 ucf td, 3:38	13	17
RUSH 10:03 Kevin Smith rush for 46 yards for a TOUCHDOWN. ucf drive: 2 plays 69 yards, 00:29 ucf td, 0:29	13	24
XP 10:03 Michael Torres extra point GOOD. ucf drive: 2 plays 69 yards, 00:29 ucf td, 0:29	13	24
PASS 7:38 Paul Smith pass complete to Trae Johnson for 27 yards for a TOUCHDOWN. tulsa drive: 6 plays 72 yards, 02:25 tulsa td, 2:25	19	24
XP 7:38 Jarod Tracy extra point GOOD. tulsa drive: 6 plays 72 yards, 02:25 tulsa td, 2:25	20	24
RUSH 3:29 Kevin Smith rush for 4 yards for a TOUCHDOWN. ucf drive: 9 plays 69 yards, 04:09 ucf td, 4:09	20	30
XP 3:29 Michael Torres extra point GOOD. ucf drive: 9 plays 69 yards, 04:09 ucf td, 4:09	20	31
FG 1:38 Jarod Tracy 32-yard field goal GOOD. tulsa drive: 9 plays 50 yards, 01:51 tulsa fg, 1:51	23	31
THIRD QUARTER	TLSA	UCF
FG 4:01 Michael Torres 21-yard field goal GOOD. ucf drive: 6 plays 36 yards, 02:50 ucf fg, 2:50	23	34
FG 0:03 Michael Torres 45-yard field goal GOOD. ucf drive: 7 plays 9 yards, 02:00 ucf fg, 2:00	23	37
FOURTH QUARTER	TLSA	UCF
SF 10:56 Kyle Israel rush for a loss of 2 yards, fumbled in the endzone, recovered by Kyle Israel for a SAFETY. ucf drive: 1 play -2 yards, 00:05 ucf saf, 0:05	25	37
RUSH 7:12 Kevin Smith rush for 74 yards for a TOUCHDOWN. ucf drive: 4 plays 89 yards, 02:12 ucf td, 2:12	25	44
XP 7:12 Michael Torres extra point GOOD. ucf drive: 4 plays 89 yards, 02:12 ucf td, 2:12	25	44
