= 2007 Florida Atlantic Owls football team =

American college football season

2007 Florida Atlantic Owls football

Sun Belt co-champion New Orleans Bowl champion

New Orleans Bowl, W 44–27 vs. Memphis
- Conference: Sun Belt Conference
- Record: 8–5 (6–1 Sun Belt)
- Head coach: Howard Schnellenberger (7th season)
- Offensive coordinator: Gary Nord (3rd season)
- Offensive scheme: Pro-style
- Defensive coordinator: Kirk Hoza (7th season)
- Base defense: 4–3
- Home stadium: Lockhart Stadium; Dolphin Stadium

2007 Sun Belt Conference football standings
	Conf.			Overall
Team	W		L	W		L
Florida Atlantic +	6	–	1	8	–	5
Troy +	6	–	1	8	–	4
Middle Tennessee	4	–	3	5	–	7
Louisiana–Monroe	4	–	3	6	–	6
Arkansas State	3	–	4	5	–	7
Louisiana–Lafayette	3	–	4	3	–	9
FIU	1	–	6	1	–	11
North Texas	1	–	6	2	–	10
+ – Conference co-champions

The 2007 Florida Atlantic Owls football team represented Florida Atlantic University (FAU) as a member of the Sun Belt Conference during the 2007 NCAA Division I FBS football season. Led by seventh-year head coach Howard Schnellenberger, the Owls compiled an overall record of 8–5 with a mark of 6–1 in conference play, sharing the Sun Belt title with Troy to capture the first conference championship in program history. Florida Atlantic was invited to the New Orleans Bowl, where the Owls defeated Memphis. The team played home games at Lockhart Stadium in Fort Lauderdale, Florida and Dolphin Stadium in Miami Gardens, Florida.

== Schedule ==
Date	Time	Opponent	Site	TV	Result	Attendance
September 1	4:00 p.m.	Middle Tennessee	Lockhart Stadium; Fort Lauderdale, FL		W 24–17	11,398
September 8	7:05 p.m.	at Oklahoma State*	Boone Pickens Stadium; Stillwater, OK		L 6–42	38,176
September 15	1:00 p.m.	Minnesota*	Dolphin Stadium; Miami Gardens, FL	ESPN360	W 42–39	10,759
September 22	7:00 p.m.	at North Texas	Fouts Field; Denton, TX	CSS	W 30–20	20,479
September 29	1:00 p.m.	at No. 14 Kentucky*	Commonwealth Stadium; Lexington, KY	ESPN Plus	L 17–45	65,927
October 6	4:00 p.m.	No. 6 South Florida*	Lockhart Stadium; Fort Lauderdale, FL (rivalry)	ESPNU	L 23–35	21,106
October 20	7:00 p.m.	at Louisiana–Lafayette	Cajun Field; Lafayette, LA	CSS	W 39–32 ^{OT}	12,290
October 27	4:00 p.m.	Louisiana–Monroe	Lockhart Stadium; Fort Lauderdale, FL	CSS	L 30–33 ^{3OT}	16,902
November 10	4:00 p.m.	Arkansas State	Lockhart Stadium; Fort Lauderdale, FL		W 34–31	18,540
November 17	12:00 p.m.	at No. 12 Florida*	Ben Hill Griffin Stadium; Gainesville, FL	PPV	L 20–59	90,107
November 24	7:00 p.m.	at FIU	Miami Orange Bowl; Miami, FL (Shula Bowl)	CSS	W 55–23	6,122
December 1	2:00 p.m.	at Troy	Movie Gallery Stadium; Troy, AL	CSS	W 38–32	17,893
December 21	7:00 p.m.	vs. Memphis*	Louisiana Superdome; New Orleans, LA (New Orleans Bowl)	ESPN2	W 44–27	25,146
*Non-conference game; Rankings from AP Poll released prior to the game; All times are in Eastern time

== Preseason ==
The 2007 FAU Owls were heavily experienced, as only four starters (combined offense and defense) graduated from the 5–7 (4–3 SBC) 2006 team. Sophomore Rusty Smith started at quarterback, having faced no battle for the position with senior Sean Clayton. The defense was senior-laden and featured returning starters at linebacker (Cergile Sincere, Andre Clark, and Frantz Joseph), defensive line (Robert St. Clair, Jervonte Jackson, and Josh Pinnick), and at both safety positions (Taheem Acevedo and Kris Bartels). On offense, Smith's right side of the line (Jarrid Smith and John Rizzo) and his center (Nick Paris) returned.

In the preseason Sun Belt coaches' poll, Florida Atlantic was picked to finish sixth in the conference.

=== Preseason All-Sun Belt honors ===
- Cergile Sincere (LB, Sr.)
- Josh Pinnick (DL, Sr.)

== Game summaries ==
=== Middle Tennessee ===
	1	2	3	4	Total
Blue Raiders	0	0	0	14	14
Owls	7	3	7	10	27

FAU avenged its 35–14 thumping by Middle Tennessee in 2006 by opening the 2007 season with 411 yards of offense. Sophomore Rusty Smith completed 12 of 26 passes, throwing for 195 yards and two touchdowns. The Owls had three rushers run for over 50 yards: Charles Pierre had 95 yards and a touchdown, B.J. Manley ran for 64 yards and Willie Rose added 53 yards. Wide receiver Cortez Gent and tight end Jason Harmon each caught a touchdown from Smith.

=== Oklahoma State ===
	1	2	3	4	Total
Owls	3	3	0	0	6
Cowboys	14	7	14	7	42

Although the Owls were riding high on emotions after their Week 1 victory over conference foe Middle Tennessee, it could not continue into Stillwater. The Owls struggled to get into any type of rhythm throughout the game, scoring only two field goals in the first half and adding nothing to their score in the second. The offense could only garner 28 net yards on the ground and 175 yards in the air throughout the game. Defensively, the Owls did not repeat their performance from the previous week, either. The Owls surrendered 233 net yards to the Cowboys on the ground.

Rusty Smith struggled the entire game, throwing for only 125 yards and an interception. Charles Pierre could only gain 7 yards on the ground through four quarters of play. The telling stat of the day was that punter, Keegan Peterson, accumulated 350 net yards of punting, which was 147 more yards than the Owls' total offense (203 yards).

=== Minnesota ===
	1	2	3	4	Total
Golden Gophers	14	0	10	15	39
Owls	14	21	0	7	42

Rusty Smith had the game of his career. In fact, he broke the school records for passing yards and touchdowns in a single game, throwing for 463 yards and five touchdowns. The Owls ended the day with 580 total yards of offense en route of the program's first victory over a BCS conference school. Offensively, FAU dominated Minnesota all four quarters of the game, amassing 42 points on six touchdowns. (Touchdown drives included: 69 yards, 90 yards, 99 yards, 62 yards, 43 yards and 88 yards).

FAU entered half time leading 35–14 after scoring 21 unanswered points in the second quarter. Minnesota rallied in the second half to bring the score within three points, but redshirt freshman Tavious Polo intercepted Gophers quarterback Adam Weber for the third time of the game to seal the victory for the Owls. The win over Minnesota gave FAU its first-ever over a Big Ten school and a BCS conference school.

The victory gave FAU various accolades from across the sporting world. Quarterback Rusty Smith was named Sun Belt Conference Offensive Player of the Week and Cornerback Tavious Polo was named Sun Belt Conference Defensive Player of the Week. Polo was also rewarded with the prestigious Walter Camp Foundation Defensive Player of the Week. Smith was named a finalist (among five others) for USA Today Player of the Week.

The victory also moved FAU up from 92nd to 82nd in the CBS Sportsline.com 120 Ranking. That is the highest the program has been ranked by CBS in the program's short seven-year history.

=== North Texas ===
	1	2	3	4	Total
Owls	3	7	3	17	30
Mean Green	7	10	3	0	20

Rusty Smith followed up his Minnesota performance with another spectacular showing. Throwing for 322 yards and a touchdown, the highlight of his night came in the fourth quarter when the Owls needed to rally from a 4-point deficit. Smith connected with wide receiver Cortez Gent for a 74-yard touchdown strike with 8:09 remaining to put the Owls up 23–20. After a proceeding three-and-out drive by North Texas, the Owls blocked the punt deep in Owls territory. DiIvory Edgecomb padded the FAU lead to 30–20, completing the fourth quarter rally to win their third game of the season and second in the Sun Belt Conference. The victory gave the Owls a 2–0 start in Sun Belt competition for the first time in their three years in the conference.

Tight end Jason Harmon and wide receiver Cortez Gent gained over 90 yards of receiving (94 and 96 respectively). Gent caught Smith's only touchdown of the night. Running backs DiIvory Edgecomb and Charles Pierre each ran for a touchdown. Kicker Warley LeRoy was 3/3 in field goals, connecting from 20, 27 and 29 yards. Defensively, freshman cornerback Tavious Polo added two interceptions to his season total, bringing the number to six. That ties the all-time FAU single-season record. Senior cornerback Taheem Acevedo intercepted North Texas, as well.

=== Kentucky ===
	1	2	3	4	Total
Owls	3	7	0	7	17
Wildcats	7	21	7	10	45

Coach Schnellenberger took his Owls to Lexington, Kentucky – home of his alma mater, the Kentucky Wildcats – after the win over North Texas. Kentucky was off to the program's best start in 20 years, at 4–0, and ranked for the first time in that time period. The Owls would face back-to-back ranked opponents in their non-conference schedule (what Coach Schnellenberger calls the "advanced training" portion of the schedule), in Kentucky and followed by home against South Florida.

Kentucky's red-hot start was fueled by quarterback Andre Woodson, who carried in an NCAA-record 325 consecutive passes without an interception. That streak was snapped by freshman cornerback Tavious Polo, recording his seventh interception of the season, in the second quarter. However, that's all Woodson would do wrong all game, as he threw for 301 yards and five touchdowns. Kentucky's welcome back to alumnus Coach Schnellenberger was rude, as the Wildcats routed the Owls, 45–17.

Quarterback Rusty Smith threw for a touchdown and an interception. The touchdown was to receiver Cortez Gent on a 20-yard reception. Running back Charles Pierre rushed for 56 yards and found the end zone via a 1-yard rush.

=== South Florida ===
	1	2	3	4	Total
Bulls	7	0	14	14	35
Owls	0	7	10	6	23

FAU and USF had only met once prior to this meeting – in 2002, USF annihilated one-year-old FAU, 51–10. In 2007, USF entered Lockhart Stadium amidst their coming-of-age season. The Bulls were ranked 6th in the nation and had beaten previously-ranked 5th West Virginia and knocked off Auburn on the road. Coming into Ft. Lauderdale was supposed to be a rest for USF before continuing on in their dream season.

However, the Owls took a 7–7 tie into halftime in front of a national audience on ESPNU. Florida Atlantic and USF exchanged points throughout the second half, battling to a 28–23 Bulls lead with 6:42 left in the game. The Owls pulled within that 5-point deficit thanks to a 47-yard touchdown pass from Rusty Smith to DiIvory Edgecomb. After FAU failed to convert a key fourth down late in the fourth quarter, USF sealed the victory on a 9-yard touchdown run from Bulls running back Benjamin Williams.

Rusty Smith had 259 yards and 3 touchdowns on USF's defense. Jason Harmon hurdled his way to 82 yards and a touchdown. Corey Small intercepted USF's Matt Grothe for a 28-yard return. Cergile Sincere had 13 tackles, including 7 solo tackles. All of this almost added up to FAU's revenge for the thumping five years ago and the biggest victory in program history. However, Matt Grothe, quarterback from USF, threw for 122 yards and rushed for 120 yards, including a 32-yard game-saving touchdown run. USF running back, Benjamin Williams, netted 189 yards and 4 touchdowns, including the game-sealing touchdown with 29 seconds remaining.

=== Louisiana–Lafayette ===
	1	2	3	4	OT	Total
Owls	10	0	7	15	7	39
Ragin' Cajuns	0	9	9	14	0	32

The Owls returned to conference competition on the road against the Ragin' Cajuns of Louisiana–Lafayette. This was the third consecutive week the Owls faced a dual-threat quarterback and Lafayette's Michael Desormeaux proved to be a handful for Florida Atlantic. Desormeaux threw for 121 yards and rushed for 156 yards. His two rushing touchdowns kept the Cajuns in the game at crucial points. For the Owls, Rusty Smith almost repeated his recording-breaking performance against Minnesota. Smith threw for 308 yards and four touchdowns. His four touchdowns were spread out amongst four different receivers: Willie Rose, Cortez Gent, Jason Harmon and Chris Bonner. The most important play of the game was the touchdown bullet from Smith to Gent for 17 yards as time expired in regulation to tie the game at 32. Florida Atlantic scored on its first possession in overtime and followed by stopping Louisiana–Lafayette for the win, 39–32.

Charles Pierre rushed for 93 yards on 16 carries, adding a touchdown in overtime. Fullback Willie Rose led the team with six receptions; Receiver Cortez Gent led the team with 82 receiving yards. Corey Small and Taheem Acevedo combined for two interceptions, picking off Desormeaux and backup quarterback Chancellor Roberson. The Owls improved to 3–0 in conference play – the first time they would start off 3–0 in conference competition.

=== Louisiana–Monroe ===
	1	2	3	4	OT	2OT	3OT	Total
Warhawks	0	10	7	7	0	3	6	33
Owls	7	7	0	10	0	3	3	30

=== Arkansas State ===
	1	2	3	4	Total
Indians	7	3	14	7	31
Owls	7	10	3	14	34

=== Florida ===
	1	2	3	4	Total
Owls	0	20	0	0	20
Gators	21	14	14	10	59

Owls quarterback Rusty Smith, born and raised in Jacksonville, Florida, grew up dreaming of playing football at Ben Hill Griffin Stadium – the home of the Florida Gators. His opportunity came on November 17 when his Owls entered the famed The Swamp in front of 90,000 Gators fans to play the defending national champions. Though his entire childhood was consumed with being a Florida Gator fanatic, Smith led his Owls through a surprising first half, as FAU pulled within as little as eight points late in the second quarter against the clearly overmatched Gators.

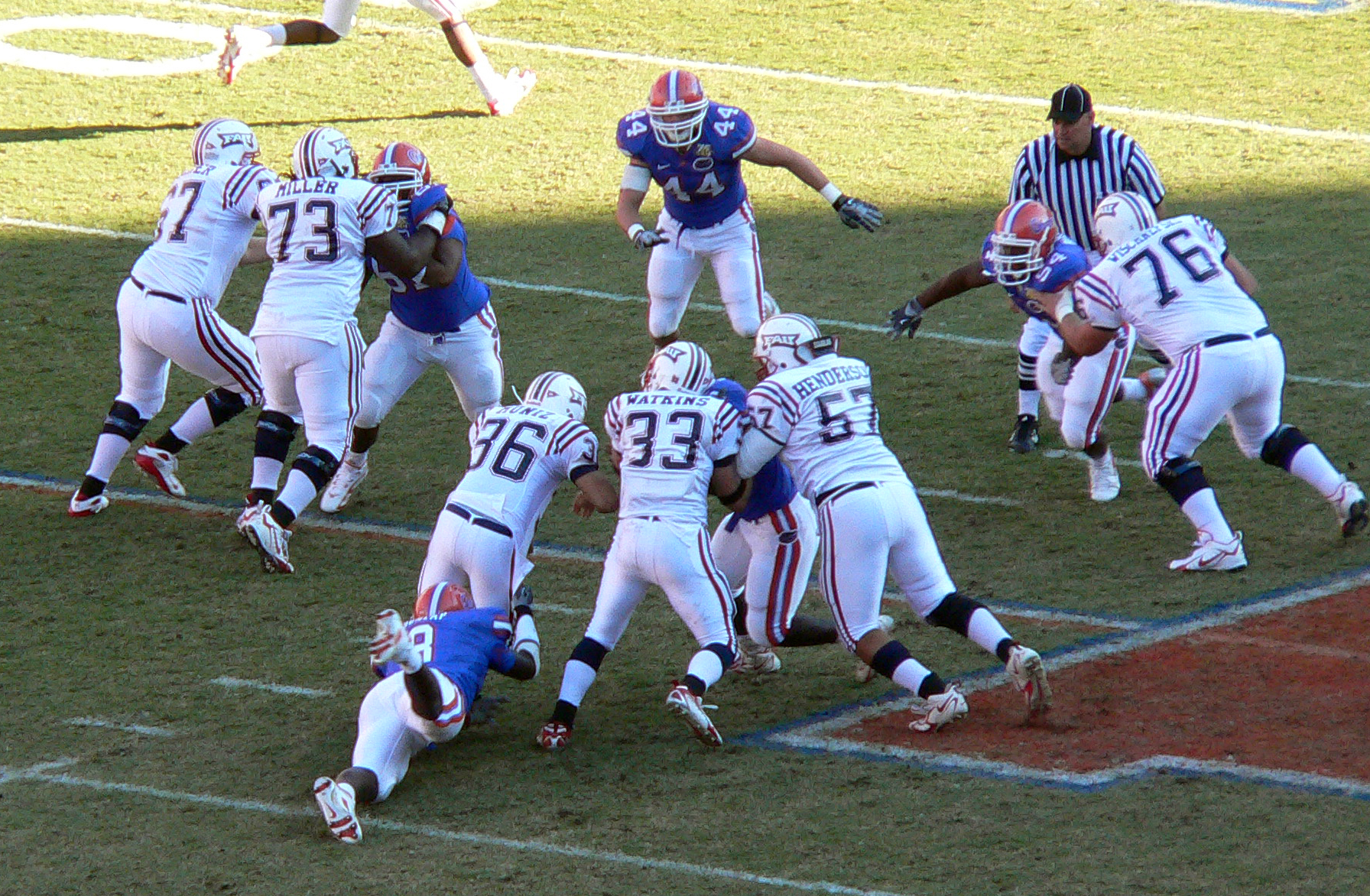
Florida Atlantic attempts a running play in the fourth quarter of their 59–20 loss at Florida.

FAU scored 20 points in the second quarter and went into halftime trailing Florida, 35–20. Unfortunately for Smith and his Owls, the first, third and fourth quarters all had zeros on the scoreboard and at the end of the day, Florida routed Florida Atlantic, 59–20.

Despite the final score, Florida Atlantic recorded 384 yards of total offense against Florida. According to the cited source, the second quarter was the team's most competitive period. Smith completed 18 of 29 passes for 290 yards and one touchdown to wide receiver Cortez Gent. Gent finished the game with 118 receiving yards, while Chris Bonner recorded four receptions for 96 yards. Corey Small intercepted a pass from Tim Tebow in the second quarter.

=== FIU ===
	1	2	3	4	Total
Owls	7	28	0	20	55
Golden Panthers	0	3	0	20	23

=== Troy ===
	1	2	3	4	Total
Owls	7	0	21	10	38
Trojans	6	3	3	20	32

It was "Championship Saturday" across college football. Though the Sun Belt Conference does not host an official championship game, the meeting between Florida Atlantic and Troy showcased the conference's #1 and #2 teams in a winner-take-all scenario for the conference championship and a bid to the New Orleans Bowl. The "Default Sun Belt Championship Game" culminated the 2007 Sun Belt Conference season, which clearly proved FAU and Troy as the top-two teams. The Owls opened the game on a 12-play, 70-yard touchdown drive, capped by a one-yard run by running back DiIvory Edgecomb. The Owls would then be held scoreless throughout the remainder of the first half, while Troy kicked three field goals. The score at halftime was 9–7, in favor of the Trojans. The offense that disappeared for FAU came out firing bullets in the third quarter, as the Owls outscored the Trojans 21–3 that quarter. Staging off a strong bid by Troy to come back in the fourth quarter, FAU held on to a six-point lead and won the game 38–32, clinching their first-ever conference championship in their seven short seasons of existence.

Quarterback Rusty Smith was, as usual, on fire. Smith completed 23-of-34 passes for 291 yards and two touchdowns. He found wide receivers Jason Harmon and Cortez Gent for his two touchdowns. Gent set career marks for himself with eight catches for 155 yards, including a 50-yard pitch and catch from Smith. Running back Charles Pierre gained 67 yards on the ground and a touchdown. Willie Rose added a rushing touchdown.

=== Memphis–New Orleans Bowl ===
	1	2	3	4	Total
Tigers	7	13	7	0	27
Owls	17	13	7	7	44

Nineteen days after capturing its first-ever conference championship, the Florida Atlantic football program took on the Memphis Tigers in the 2007 R+L Carriers New Orleans Bowl in the Louisiana Superdome in New Orleans. Just a short seven years since playing its first intercollegiate game and three years since playing in Division I-A competition, the Owls became the quickest start-up program in NCAA history to reach a bowl game. Coach Howard Schnellenberger was a perfect 4–0 in bowl games (2–0 at Miami, 2–0 at Louisville) entering the game. From start to finish, the Owls' offense was unstoppable and Memphis could only force the Owls to punt three times. Quarterback Rusty Smith was simply dominant: 25–32 for 336 yards and five touchdowns. His five touchdowns set a New Orleans Bowl record for passing touchdowns and was clearly enough to win him the 2007 New Orleans Bowl Most Valuable Player Award.

The Owls outgained the Tigers offensively, 465 yards to 398. The rushing attack for the Owls was prolific compared to the regular-season numbers from the unit, as collectively four guys rushed for 134 yards (Charles Pierre 52 yards, Sean Clayton 32, DiIvory Edgecomb 23, Willie Rose 22). However, as it was all season, the story offensively for the Owls was Rusty Smith and the passing game. Smith completed a pass to eight different receivers, including tight end Jason Harmon 11 times for 97 yards. More impressive than eight receivers catching a pass was Smith finding five different receivers for his five touchdowns catches. Harmon, Rose, Pierre, Edgecomb and Chris Bonner all caught a touchdown pass. Pierre added a rushing touchdown. Linebacker Frantz Joseph had 10 tackles, two of which were for losses and a sack.

The Owls capped off a historic season with a 44–27 performance against Memphis in the 2007 New Orleans Bowl. The Owls won their first-ever bowl game in their first-ever bowl appearance in the shortest amount of time it has ever taken an NCAA football program to reach its first-ever bowl game.

== Personnel ==
=== Depth chart ===
Defense

FS
Taheem Acevedo
Carldayle Brantley

WLB	Middle LB	SLB
⋅	Frantz Joseph	⋅
George Allen	Kris Rush	⋅

SS
Kris Bartels
Rod Huggins

CB
Tavious Polo
Gedel Merzius

DE	DT	DT	DE
Josh Pinnick	Josh Savidge	Jervonte Jackson	Robert St. Clair
Micheal Hancok	Gil Monzon	John Mertilus	Julian Myers

CB
Corey Small
Tavoris Hill

Offense

WR
Cortez Gent
Conshario Johnson

LT	LG	C	RG	RT
Lavoris Williams	David Matlock	Nick Paris	Jarrid Smith	John Rizzo
Brandon Jackson	Jarret McDonald	Ryan Wischnefski	Kevin Miller	Vinnie Henderson

TE
Jason Harmon
Jamari Grant

WR
Chris Bonner
Avery Holley

QB
Rusty Smith
Sean Clayton

RB
Charles Pierre
B.J. Manley

FB
Willie Rose
Dominick Walker

== Awards and honors ==
- Week 3 USA Today National Player of the Week: Rusty Smith (QB, So.)
- Week 3 National Player of the Week, Defense: Tavious Polo (CB, Fr.)
- Week 3 Sun Belt Conference Player of the Week, Offense: Rusty Smith (QB, So.)
- Week 3 Sun Belt Conference Player of the Week, Defense: Tavious Polo (CB, Fr.)
- Week 6 Sun Belt Conference Player of the Week, Offense: Rusty Smith (QB, So.)
- Week 13 Sun Belt Conference Player of the Week, Offense: Rusty Smith (QB, So.)
- Week 13 Sun Belt Conference Player of the Week, Special Teams: DiIvory Edgecomb (KR, Jr.)
- Week 14 Sun Belt Conference Player of the Week, Offense: Rusty Smith (QB, So.)
- Week 14 Sun Belt Conference Player of the Week, Defense: Frantz Joseph (LB, Jr.)
- 2007 Shula Bowl Most Valuable Player: Rusty Smith (QB, So.)
- 2007 New Orleans Bowl Most Valuable Player: Rusty Smith (QB, So.)
- Sun Belt Conference Player of the Year: Rusty Smith (QB, So.)
- Sun Belt Conference Coach of the Year: Howard Schnellenberger

=== All-Sun Belt honors ===
- First Team All-Sun Belt Conference:
  - Rusty Smith (QB, So.)
  - Cortez Gent (WR, So.)
  - Jason Harmon (TE, Jr.)
  - Frantz Joseph (LB, Jr.)
  - Cergile Sincere (LB, Sr.)
  - Tavious Polo (CB, Fr.)
- Second Team All-Sun Belt Conference:
  - John Rizzo (OL, Jr.)
  - Jarrid Smith (OL, Sr.)
  - Jervonte Jackson (DL, Jr.)
  - Corey Small (CB, Jr.)
- Honorable Mention All-Sun Belt Conference:
  - Kris Bartels (DB, Sr.)
  - Charles Pierre (RB, Jr.)

== New program records ==
Florida Atlantic players broke numerous program records during the 2007 season.

Statistic	Previous record	New record
Passing yards in a season	Jared Allen (3,003 in 2003)	Rusty Smith (3,688 yards)
Passing yards in a game	Jared Allen (352 vs. UCF in 2003)	Rusty Smith (463 vs. Minnesota)
Passing touchdowns in a season	Jared Allen (23 in 2003)	Rusty Smith (32)
Passing touchdowns in a game	Jared Allen (3, 3 times)	Rusty Smith (5 vs. Minnesota)
Passing completions in a season	Jared Allen (218 in 2003)	Rusty Smith (281)
Passing completions in a game	Jared Allen (28 vs. Hawaii in 2004)	Rusty Smith (35 vs. Louisiana–Monroe)
Total tackles in a season	Quentin Swain (104 in 2004)	Frantz Joseph (131)
Interceptions in a season	Willie Hughley (6 in 2004)	Tavious Polo (7)
