= 2007 UTEP Miners football team =

American college football season

2007 UTEP Miners football
- Conference: Conference USA
- West Division
- Record: 4–8 (2–6 C-USA)
- Head coach: Mike Price (4th season)
- Offensive coordinator: Eric Price (4th season)
- Offensive scheme: Spread
- Defensive coordinator: Tim Hundley (4th season)
- Base defense: Multiple
- Home stadium: Sun Bowl

2007 Conference USA football standings
	Conf.			Overall
Team	W		L	W		L
East Division
UCF x$	7	–	1	10	–	4
East Carolina	6	–	2	8	–	5
Memphis	6	–	2	7	–	6
Southern Miss	5	–	3	7	–	6
Marshall	3	–	5	3	–	9
UAB	1	–	7	2	–	10
West Division
Tulsa xy	6	–	2	10	–	4
Houston x	6	–	2	8	–	5
Tulane	3	–	5	4	–	8
Rice	3	–	5	3	–	9
UTEP	2	–	6	4	–	8
SMU	0	–	8	1	–	11
Championship: UCF 44, Tulsa 25
$ – Conference champion; x – Division champion/co-champions; y – Championship game participant; Rankings from AP Poll

The 2007 UTEP Miners football team represented the University of Texas at El Paso (UTEP) as a member of the West Division in Conference USA (C-USA) during the 2007 NCAA Division I FCS football season. Led by fourth-year head coach Mike Price, the Miners compiled an overall record of 4–8 with a mark of 2–6 in conference play, placing fifth in the C-USA's West Division. The team played home games at the Sun Bowl in El Paso, Texas.

UTEP averaged 36,569 fans per game, ranking 64th nationally.

== Schedule ==
Date	Time	Opponent	Site	TV	Result	Attendance
September 1	8:00 pm	New Mexico*	Sun Bowl; El Paso, TX	CSTV	W 10–6	43,326
September 8	5:00 pm	at Texas Tech*	Jones AT&T Stadium; Lubbock, TX		L 31–45	52,403
September 15	8:00 pm	at New Mexico State*	Aggie Memorial Stadium; Las Cruces, NM	ESPN360	L 24–29	30,343
September 22	7:05 pm	Texas Southern*	Sun Bowl; El Paso, TX		W 52–12	35,336
September 29	2:30 pm	at SMU	Gerald J. Ford Stadium; University Park, TX	CSTV	W 48–45 ^{OT}	16,464
October 6	7:05 pm	Tulsa	Sun Bowl; El Paso, TX		W 48–47	35,676
October 13	7:05 pm	East Carolina^{†}	Sun Bowl; El Paso, TX	MASN	L 42–45 ^{OT}	41,365
October 27	7:05 pm	Houston	Sun Bowl; El Paso, TX		L 31–34	35,116
November 3	1:00 pm	at Rice	Rice Stadium; Houston, TX		L 48–56	12,313
November 10	5:00 pm	at Tulane	Louisiana Superdome; New Orleans, LA		L 19–34	15,479
November 17	5:30 pm	Southern Miss	Sun Bowl; El Paso, TX	CSTV	L 30–56	28,592
November 24	12:00 pm	at Central Florida	Bright House Networks Stadium; Orlando, FL		L 20–36	41,967
*Non-conference game; ^{†}Homecoming; All times are in Mountain time

== Game summaries ==
=== New Mexico ===
	1	2	3	4	Total
New Mexico	0	3	0	3	6
UTEP	3	0	0	7	10

=== Texas Tech ===
	1	2	3	4	Total
UTEP	21	7	3	0	31
Texas Tech	7	10	14	14	45

Texas Tech defeated the University of Texas at El Paso, 45–31. Texas Tech got on the scoreboard first when Kobey Lewis rushed up the middle for a one-yard touchdown with Alex Trlica making the point after.

UTEP answered with an eight-yard pass from Trevor Vittatoe to Jeff Moturi for a touchdown. The Miners successfully made the PAT to tie the game. The next score also came from UTEP, giving them the lead on a 41-yard-pass from Vittatoe to Joe West, followed by a point after. UTEP scored a third time before the end of the first quarter. UTEP running back Marcus Thomas, who sat out the previous game because of a suspension, scored on a one-yard-run. Another successfully PAT followed. This gave the Miners a 21–7 lead going into the second quarter.

In the second quarter, the Red Raiders scored first on a pass from Graham Harrell to Michael Crabtree. The Miner's Thomas made another touchdown, bringing the score to 28–14, UTEP, after the successful PAT. Texas Tech scored a field goal as the first half wound to a close.

In the third quarter, the Red Raiders scored twice. First on a nine-yard touchdown pass from Harrell to Crabtree. Then Harrell threw for another touchdown. Both scores were followed by successful extra points by Alex Trlica. The Miners added three points with a field goal, closing out the quarter with a 31-point tie.

Texas Tech defense held UTEP scoreless in the game's final quarter while the offense added 14. Harrell passed to Grant Walker down the middle for an eight-yard touchdown. The successful PAT made it Texas Tech 38, UTEP 31. On the final score, running back Shannon Woods rushed up the middle for a two-yard-touchdown. Texas Tech made the PAT to close the game out with a 45–31 lead.

=== New Mexico State ===
	1	2	3	4	Total
UTEP	7	7	3	7	24
New Mexico State	6	3	7	13	29

=== Texas Southern ===
	1	2	3	4	Total
Texas Southern	0	0	6	6	12
UTEP	24	14	7	7	52

=== SMU ===
	1	2	3	4	OT	Total
UTEP	0	14	14	14	6	48
SMU	7	21	7	7	3	45

=== Tulsa ===
	1	2	3	4	Total
Tulsa	7	16	7	17	47
UTEP	14	7	7	20	48

=== East Carolina ===
	1	2	3	4	OT	Total
East Carolina	18	8	14	7	6	53
UTEP	7	12	6	14	3	42

=== Houston ===
	1	2	3	4	Total
Houston	7	10	3	14	34
UTEP	3	14	7	7	31

=== Rice ===
	1	2	3	4	Total
UTEP	3	17	22	6	48
Rice	14	7	7	28	56

=== Tulane ===
	1	2	3	4	Total
UTEP	0	10	3	6	19
Tulane	10	7	7	10	34

=== Southern Miss ===
	1	2	3	4	Total
Southern Miss	7	7	21	21	56
UTEP	7	3	13	7	30

=== Central Florida ===
	1	2	3	4	Total
UTEP	0	10	7	3	20
UCF	0	16	6	14	36

== Roster ==
2007 UTEP Miners football team roster
Players
Coaches
Offense

Pos.	#	Name	Class
WR	2	Kris Adams	Fr
QB	7	Jeremy Springer	Fr
OL	71	Mike Aguayo	So
TE	89	Geoff Amato	Fr

Defense

Pos.	#	Name	Class

Special teams

Pos.	#	Name	Class
K	49	Craig Alaniz	Fr

Head coach

- Mike Price

Coordinators/assistant coaches

- Ikaika Malloe (DL)

Legend

- (C) Team captain
- (S) Suspended
- (I) Ineligible
- Injured
- Redshirt

Roster
