= 2007 Louisiana–Monroe Warhawks football team =

American college football season

2007 Louisiana–Monroe Warhawks football
- Conference: Sun Belt Conference
- Record: 6–6 (4–3 Sun Belt)
- Head coach: Charlie Weatherbie (5th season)
- Co-offensive coordinators: Steve Farmer (1st season); Nate Kaczor (1st season)
- Defensive coordinator: Kim Dameron (3rd season)
- Home stadium: Malone Stadium

2007 Sun Belt Conference football standings
	Conf.			Overall
Team	W		L	W		L
Florida Atlantic +	6	–	1	8	–	5
Troy +	6	–	1	8	–	4
Middle Tennessee	4	–	3	5	–	7
Louisiana–Monroe	4	–	3	6	–	6
Arkansas State	3	–	4	5	–	7
Louisiana–Lafayette	3	–	4	3	–	9
FIU	1	–	6	1	–	11
North Texas	1	–	6	2	–	10
+ – Conference co-champions

The 2007 Louisiana–Monroe Warhawks football team represented the University of Louisiana at Monroe as a member of the Sun Belt Conference the 2007 NCAA Division I FBS football season. Led by fifth-year head coach Charlie Weatherbie, the Warhawks compiled an overall record of 6–6 with a mark of 4–3 in conference play, tying for third place in the Sun Belt. The Louisiana–Monroe's offense scored 282 points while the defense allowed 332 points. The team played home games at Malone Stadium in Monroe, Louisiana.

During the year, the Warhawks upset the Alabama Crimson Tide on the road in Bryant–Denny Stadium by a score of 21–14 despite being 25-point underdogs and expected to lose by as much as 38.

== Schedule ==
Date	Time	Opponent	Site	TV	Result	Attendance	Source
August 30	6:00 pm	Tulsa*	Malone Stadium; Monroe, LA	ESPN2	L 17–35	22,022	
September 8	12:00 pm	at No. 25 Clemson*	Memorial Stadium; Clemson, SC		L 26–49	77,628	
September 15	6:00 pm	at No. 18 Texas A&M*	Kyle Field; College Station, TX		L 14–54	77,309	
September 29	6:00 pm	at Troy	Movie Gallery Stadium; Troy, AL	CSS	L 7–24	18,273	
October 6	6:00 pm	Arkansas State	Malone Stadium; Monroe, LA		W 30–13	12,088	
October 13	6:00 pm	at North Texas	Fouts Field; Denton, TX	ESPN Plus	L 21–31	18,973	
October 20	6:00 pm	FIU	Malone Stadium; Monroe, LA		W 28–14	8,814	
October 27	3:00 pm	at Florida Atlantic	Lockhart Stadium; Fort Lauderdale, FL	CSS	W 33–30 ^{3OT}	16,902	
November 3	6:00 pm	Middle Tennessee	Malone Stadium; Monroe, LA		L 40–43	10,228	
November 10	4:00 pm	Grambling State*	Malone Stadium; Monroe, LA		W 28–14	30,101	
November 17	1:30 pm	at Alabama*	Bryant–Denny Stadium; Tuscaloosa, AL		W 21–14	92,138	
November 24	6:00 pm	at Louisiana–Lafayette	Cajun Field; Lafayette, LA (Battle on the Bayou)		W 17–11	8,045	
*Non-conference game; Rankings from AP Poll released prior to the game; All times are in Central time
