= 2007 Houston Cougars football team =

American college football season

2007 Houston Cougars football

C-USA West Division co-champion

Texas Bowl, L 13–20 vs. TCU
- Conference: Conference USA
- West Division
- Record: 8–5 (6–2 C-USA)
- Head coach: Art Briles (5th season; regular season); Chris Thurmond (interim; bowl game)
- Co-offensive coordinators: Randy Clements (1st season); Philip Montgomery (1st season)
- Offensive scheme: Veer and shoot
- Defensive coordinator: Alan Weddell (2nd season)
- Base defense: 4–3
- Captain: Game captains
- Home stadium: Robertson Stadium

2007 Conference USA football standings
	Conf.			Overall
Team	W		L	W		L
East Division
UCF x$	7	–	1	10	–	4
East Carolina	6	–	2	8	–	5
Memphis	6	–	2	7	–	6
Southern Miss	5	–	3	7	–	6
Marshall	3	–	5	3	–	9
UAB	1	–	7	2	–	10
West Division
Tulsa xy	6	–	2	10	–	4
Houston x	6	–	2	8	–	5
Tulane	3	–	5	4	–	8
Rice	3	–	5	3	–	9
UTEP	2	–	6	4	–	8
SMU	0	–	8	1	–	11
Championship: UCF 44, Tulsa 25
$ – Conference champion; x – Division champion/co-champions; y – Championship game participant; Rankings from AP Poll

The 2007 Houston Cougars football team represented the University of Houston as a member of Conference USA (C-USA) during the 2007 NCAA Division I FBS football season. Led by Art Briles in his fifth and final year as head coaching during the regular season and Chris Thurmond as interim head coach for their bowl game, the Cougars compiled an overall record of 8–5 with a mark of 6–2 in conference play, sharing C-USA's West Division title with Tulsa. By virtue of their head-to-head win over Houston, the Hurricanes advanced to the Conference USA Championship Game. Houston was invited to the Texas Bowl, where the Cougars lost to TCU. The team played home games on campus, at Robertson Stadium in Houston.

== Schedule ==
Date	Time	Opponent	Site	TV	Result	Attendance
September 1	2:30 pm	at Oregon*	Autzen Stadium; Eugene, OR		L 27–48	57,662
September 15	6:00 pm	at Tulane	Louisiana Superdome; New Orleans, LA		W 34–10	21,311
September 22	3:30 pm	Colorado State*	Robertson Stadium; Houston, TX	CSTV	W 38–27	22,468
September 29	6:00 pm	East Carolina	Robertson Stadium; Houston, TX	WITN	L 35–37	20,719
October 6	2:00 pm	at Alabama*	Bryant–Denny Stadium; Tuscaloosa, AL		L 24–30	92,138
October 13	2:30 pm	Rice	Robertson Stadium; Houston, TX (rivalry)	CSTV	W 56–48	26,514
October 20	6:00 pm	at UAB	Legion Field; Birmingham, AL		W 49–10	11,588
October 27	8:00 pm	at UTEP	Sun Bowl; El Paso, TX		W 34–31	35,116
November 4	7:00 pm	SMU	Robertson Stadium; Houston, TX (rivalry)	ESPN	W 38–28	22,774
November 10	2:00 pm	at Tulsa	Skelly Field at H. A. Chapman Stadium; Tulsa, OK		L 7–56	25,428
November 17	2:30 pm	Marshall^{†}	Robertson Stadium; Houston, TX	WOWK	W 35–28	21,116
November 24	2:30 pm	Texas Southern*	Robertson Stadium; Houston, TX		W 59–6	12,139
December 28	7:00 pm	vs. TCU*	Reliant Stadium; Houston, TX (Texas Bowl)	NFLN	L 13–20	62,097
*Non-conference game; ^{†}Homecoming; All times are in Central time
