= 2007 UAB Blazers football team =

American college football season

2007 UAB Blazers football
- Conference: Conference USA
- East Division
- Record: 2–10 (1–7 C-USA)
- Head coach: Neil Callaway (1st season)
- Offensive coordinator: Kim Helton (1st season)
- Offensive scheme: Pro spread
- Defensive coordinator: Eric Schumann (1st season)
- Base defense: 4–3
- Home stadium: Legion Field

2007 Conference USA football standings
	Conf.			Overall
Team	W		L	W		L
East Division
UCF x$	7	–	1	10	–	4
East Carolina	6	–	2	8	–	5
Memphis	6	–	2	7	–	6
Southern Miss	5	–	3	7	–	6
Marshall	3	–	5	3	–	9
UAB	1	–	7	2	–	10
West Division
Tulsa xy	6	–	2	10	–	4
Houston x	6	–	2	8	–	5
Tulane	3	–	5	4	–	8
Rice	3	–	5	3	–	9
UTEP	2	–	6	4	–	8
SMU	0	–	8	1	–	11
Championship: UCF 44, Tulsa 25
$ – Conference champion; x – Division champion/co-champions; y – Championship game participant; Rankings from AP Poll

The 2007 UAB Blazers football team represented the University of Alabama at Birmingham (UAB) as a member of the East Division in Conference USA (C-USA) during the 2007 NCAA Division I FBS football season. Led by first-year head coach Neil Callaway, the Blazers compiled an overall record of 2–10 with a mark of 1–7 in conference play, placing last out of six teams in C-USA's East Division. The team played home games at Legion Field in Birmingham, Alabama.

== Schedule ==
Date	Time	Opponent	Site	TV	Result	Attendance
September 1	11:00 a.m.	at Michigan State*	Spartan Stadium; East Lansing, MI	ESPN2	L 18–55	67,796
September 8	4:00 p.m.	at Florida State*	Doak Campbell Stadium; Tallahassee, FL	ESPNU	L 24–34	78,673
September 15	6:00 p.m.	Alcorn State*	Legion Field; Birmingham, AL		W 22–0	21,828
September 29	6:00 p.m.	at Tulsa	Chapman Stadium; Tulsa, OK		L 30–38	22,710
October 6	1:30 p.m.	at Mississippi State*	Davis Wade Stadium; Starkville, MS		L 13–30	45,259
October 13	6:00 p.m.	Tulane^{†}	Legion Field; Birmingham, AL		W 26–21	24,144
October 20	6:00 p.m.	Houston	Legion Field; Birmingham, AL		L 10–49	11,588
October 27	2:30 p.m.	at East Carolina	Dowdy–Ficklen Stadium; Greenville, NC		L 6–41	41,125
November 3	6:00 p.m.	Southern Miss	Legion Field; Birmingham, AL	CSS	L 7–37	13,348
November 10	6:30 p.m.	UCF	Legion Field; Birmingham, AL	CSTV	L 31–45	12,621
November 17	2:30 p.m.	at Memphis	Liberty Bowl Memorial Stadium; Memphis, TN (Battle for the Bones)	CSS	L 9–25	31,138
November 24	3:30 p.m.	at Marshall	Joan C. Edwards Stadium; Huntington, WV		L 39–46	26,762
*Non-conference game; ^{†}Homecoming; All times are in Central time

== Game summaries ==
=== Michigan State ===
	1	2	3	4	Total
UAB	0	3	2	13	18
Michigan State	21	24	3	7	55

In the first game of the Neil Callaway era, the Blazers would make their first-ever trip to the state of Michigan in this 55–18 defeat by the Spartans. The Blazers would fall behind 42–0 before Swayze Waters hit a 35-yard field goal before the half. After a safety early in the third, Waters would hit a pair of long field goals (50 and 47 yards) and score the seasons' first touchdown on a 15-yard Joseph Webb reception from Sam Hunt in the fourth. For the game, the Blazers were outgained on offense 593 to 226 total yards.

=== Florida State ===
	1	2	3	4	Total
UAB	10	7	7	0	24
Florida State	3	7	21	3	34

On the road, the Blazers would take a 17–10 lead at the half only to give up 21 points in the third in this 34–24 defeat to the Seminoles. UAB would take the early lead on a 27-yard Swayze Waters field goal, and extend it to 10–0 on FSU's ensuing possession with Will Dunbar returning an interception 21-yards for the score. In the second, Sam Hunt would score on a 4-yard run to extend the lead to 17–3, before the Seminoles responded with a touchdown of their own in narrowing the lead to 17–10 at the half. Florida State would open the third with a pair of touchdowns to take a 24–17 lead, before UAB responded with a 16-yard Joseph Webb touchdown reception from Hunt to knot the game at 24. However, the Seminoles would close the game with 10 unanswered points to seal the 34–24 win.

=== Alcorn State ===
	1	2	3	4	Total
Alcorn State	0	0	0	0	0
UAB	6	10	6	0	22

The first win of the Callaway era would come in the seasons first home game with a 22–0 victory over the FCS Braves of Alcorn State. Swayze Waters would star in hitting 5 field goals from 42, 32, 52, 22 and 38 yards respectively. The Blazers would visit the end zone only once on a 4-yard David Sigler touchdown reception from Sam Hunt in the second quarter. For the game, Waters set a team record for most field goals in a game, tied the team record for longest Blazer field goal (52 yards) and tied the conference record for most field goals in a game.

=== Tulsa ===
	1	2	3	4	Total
UAB	0	10	6	14	30
Tulsa	3	14	14	7	38

=== Mississippi State ===
	1	2	3	4	Total
UAB	0	10	3	0	13
Mississippi State	0	3	6	21	30

=== Tulane ===
	1	2	3	4	Total
Tulane	0	14	0	7	21
UAB	0	13	7	6	26

=== Houston ===
	1	2	3	4	Total
Houston	14	21	7	7	49
UAB	3	7	0	0	10

=== East Carolina ===
	1	2	3	4	Total
UAB	3	3	0	0	6
East Carolina	10	10	21	0	41

=== Southern Miss ===
	1	2	3	4	Total
Southern Miss	3	27	7	0	37
UAB	0	0	7	0	7

=== UCF ===
	1	2	3	4	Total
UCF	10	7	14	14	45
UAB	14	3	7	7	31

=== Memphis ===
	1	2	3	4	Total
UAB	0	3	0	6	9
Memphis	0	13	3	9	25

=== Marshall ===
	1	2	3	4	Total
UAB	7	0	18	14	39
Marshall	14	14	7	11	46

== Personnel ==
=== Coaching staff ===
- Neil Callaway – Head Coach
- Kim Helton – Offensive coordinator/tight ends
- Eric Schumann – Defensive coordinator/safeties
- Corey Barlow – Cornerbacks
- Tim Bowens – Receivers
- Lorenzo Costantini – Defensive line
- Steve Davenport – Running backs
- Will Friend – Offensive line
- Tyson Helton – Quarterbacks/recruiting coordinator
- Tyson Summers – Linebackers
- Steve Martin – Strength and Conditioning/Football & Baseball
- Ervin Lewis – Director of Football Operations
