= 2007 Southern Miss Golden Eagles football team =

American college football season

2007 Southern Miss Golden Eagles football

PapaJohns.com Bowl, L 21–31 vs. Cincinnati
- Conference: Conference USA
- Record: 7–6 (5–3 C-USA)
- Head coach: Jeff Bower (18th season)
- Offensive coordinator: Jay Johnson (3rd season)
- Offensive scheme: Multiple
- Defensive coordinator: Jay Hopson (3rd season)
- Base defense: 4–3
- Home stadium: M. M. Roberts Stadium

2007 Conference USA football standings
	Conf.			Overall
Team	W		L	W		L
East Division
UCF x$	7	–	1	10	–	4
East Carolina	6	–	2	8	–	5
Memphis	6	–	2	7	–	6
Southern Miss	5	–	3	7	–	6
Marshall	3	–	5	3	–	9
UAB	1	–	7	2	–	10
West Division
Tulsa xy	6	–	2	10	–	4
Houston x	6	–	2	8	–	5
Tulane	3	–	5	4	–	8
Rice	3	–	5	3	–	9
UTEP	2	–	6	4	–	8
SMU	0	–	8	1	–	11
Championship: UCF 44, Tulsa 25
$ – Conference champion; x – Division champion/co-champions; y – Championship game participant; Rankings from AP Poll

The 2007 Southern Miss Golden Eagles football team represented The University of Southern Mississippi in the 2007 NCAA Division I FBS football season. The team's head coach was Jeff Bower, who was in his 18th year at Southern Miss. Southern Miss played their home games at M. M. Roberts Stadium in Hattiesburg, Mississippi and competed in the East Division of Conference USA.

The Golden Eagles finished the season with a record of 7–6, 5–3 in C-USA play, and lost to Cincinnati, 31–21, in the PapaJohns.com Bowl.

== Schedule ==
Date	Time	Opponent	Site	TV	Result	Attendance	Source
September 1	6:00 pm	Tennessee–Martin*	M. M. Roberts Stadium; Hattiesburg, MS		W 35–13	29,253	
September 8	6:00 pm	at No. 24 Tennessee*	Neyland Stadium; Knoxville, TN	PPV	L 39–19	106,311	
September 15	5:00 pm	at East Carolina*	Dowdy–Ficklen Stadium; Greenville, NC		W 28–21	31,170	
September 27	6:30 pm	at Boise State*	Bronco Stadium; Boise, ID	ESPN	L 38–16	30,159	
October 3	7:00 pm	Rice	M. M. Roberts Stadium; Hattiesburg, MS	ESPN2	L 31–29	25,656	
October 13	6:30 pm	SMU^{†}	M. M. Roberts Stadium; Hattiesburg, MS	CSTV	W 28–7	31,253	
October 21	7:00 pm	at Marshall	Joan C. Edwards Stadium; Huntington, WV	ESPN	W 33–24	27,234	
October 28	7:00 pm	UCF	M. M. Roberts Stadium; Hattiesburg, MS	ESPN	L 34–17	27,103	
November 3	6:00 pm	at UAB	Legion Field; Birmingham, AL	CSS	W 37–7	13,348	
November 10	3:30 pm	Memphis	M. M. Roberts Stadium; Hattiesburg, MS	CSS	L 29–26	29,354	
November 17	6:30 pm	at UTEP	Sun Bowl; El Paso, TX	CSTV	W 56–30	28,592	
November 24	2:00 pm	Arkansas State	M. M. Roberts Stadium; Hattiesburg, MS		W 16–10	17,705	
December 22	12:00 pm	vs. No. 20 Cincinnati*	Legion Field; Birmingham, AL (PapaJohns.com Bowl)	ESPN2	L 31–21	35,258	
*Non-conference game; ^{†}Homecoming; Rankings from AP Poll released prior to the game

== Roster ==
2007 Southern Miss Golden Eagles football team roster
Players
Coaches
Offense

Pos.	#	Name	Class
QB	--	Austin Davis	Fr
TE	1	Shawn Nelson	Jr
QB	14	Martevious Young	Fr

Defense

Pos.	#	Name	Class
DE	91	Robert Henderson	Sr

Special teams

Pos.	#	Name	Class

Head coach

- Jeff Bower

Coordinators/assistant coaches

- Derrick Nix (Running backs)

Legend

- (C) Team captain
- (S) Suspended
- (I) Ineligible
- Injured
- Redshirt

Roster
