= 2007 Tulsa Golden Hurricane football team =

American college football season

2007 Tulsa Golden Hurricane football

C-USA West Division co-champion GMAC Bowl champion

C-USA Championship Game, L 25–44 vs. UCF

GMAC Bowl, W 63–7 vs. Bowling Green
- Conference: Conference USA
- West Division
- Record: 10–4 (6–2 C-USA)
- Head coach: Todd Graham (1st season)
- Co-offensive coordinators: Gus Malzahn (1st season); Herb Hand (1st season)
- Offensive scheme: Spread option
- Defensive coordinator: Keith Patterson (2nd season)
- Co-defensive coordinator: Paul Randolph (1st season)
- Base defense: 3–3–5
- Home stadium: Skelly Field at H. A. Chapman Stadium

2007 Conference USA football standings
	Conf.			Overall
Team	W		L	W		L
East Division
UCF x$	7	–	1	10	–	4
East Carolina	6	–	2	8	–	5
Memphis	6	–	2	7	–	6
Southern Miss	5	–	3	7	–	6
Marshall	3	–	5	3	–	9
UAB	1	–	7	2	–	10
West Division
Tulsa xy	6	–	2	10	–	4
Houston x	6	–	2	8	–	5
Tulane	3	–	5	4	–	8
Rice	3	–	5	3	–	9
UTEP	2	–	6	4	–	8
SMU	0	–	8	1	–	11
Championship: UCF 44, Tulsa 25
$ – Conference champion; x – Division champion/co-champions; y – Championship game participant; Rankings from AP Poll

The 2007 Tulsa Golden Hurricane football team represented the University of Tulsa in the 2007 NCAA Division I FBS football season. The team's head coach was Todd Graham, in his first year at Tulsa. They played home games at Skelly Field at H. A. Chapman Stadium in Tulsa, Oklahoma and competed in the West Division of Conference USA.

== Schedule ==
Date	Time	Opponent	Site	TV	Result	Attendance
August 30	6:00 pm	at Louisiana–Monroe*	Malone Stadium; Monroe, LA	ESPN2	W 35–17	22,022
September 15	8:00 pm	BYU*	Skelly Field at H. A. Chapman Stadium; Tulsa, OK	CSTV	W 55–47	24,445
September 21	7:00 pm	No. 4 Oklahoma*	Skelly Field at H. A. Chapman Stadium; Tulsa, OK	ESPN2	L 21–62	35,542
September 29	6:00 pm	UAB	Skelly Field at H. A. Chapman Stadium; Tulsa, OK		W 38–30	22,710
October 6	8:05 pm	at UTEP	Sun Bowl; El Paso, TX		L 47–48	35,676
October 13	6:00 pm	Marshall^{†}	Skelly Field at H. A. Chapman Stadium; Tulsa, OK		W 38–31	20,255
October 20	3:00 pm	at UCF	Bright House Networks Stadium; Orlando, FL		L 23–44	45,510
October 27	2:00 pm	SMU	Skelly Field at H. A. Chapman Stadium; Tulsa, OK		W 29–23	18,853
November 3	6:30 pm	at Tulane	Louisiana Superdome; New Orleans, LA	CSTV	W 49–25	15,271
November 10	2:00 pm	Houston	Skelly Field at H. A. Chapman Stadium; Tulsa, OK		W 56–7	25,428
November 17	11:00 am	at Army*	Michie Stadium; West Point, NY	ESPN Classic	W 49–39	27,687
November 24	2:00 pm	at Rice	Rice Stadium; Houston, TX		W 48–43	11,742
December 1	11:00 am	at UCF	Bright House Networks Stadium; Orlando, FL (Conference USA Championship Game)	ESPN	L 25–44	44,128
January 6	7:00 pm	vs. Bowling Green*	Ladd–Peebles Stadium; Mobile, AL (GMAC Bowl)	ESPN	W 63–7	36,932
*Non-conference game; ^{†}Homecoming; Rankings from AP Poll released prior to the game; All times are in Central time

== Coaching staff ==
Name	Position	Alma mater	Year entering
Todd Graham	Head coach	East Central	1st
Gus Malzahn	Assistant head coach/Offensive coordinator/Quarterback	Arkansas	1st
Herb Hand	Co-offensive coordinator/Offensive line	Hamilton	1st
Paul Randolph	Co-defensive coordinator/Defensive Line	UT Martin	1st
Dan Phillips	Co-defensive coordinator/Linebackers	Central Oklahoma	1st
Jason Jones	Special teams Coordinator/Cornerback	Alabama	1st
Jess Loepp	Recruiting coordinator/safeties	Central Oklahoma	1st
Bill Blankenship	Wide receiver	Tulsa	1st
Bo Graham	Running backs	West Virginia	1st
Dean Jackson	Tight ends	Wichita State	1st
Yancy McNight	Head Strength and Conditioning Coach	Missouri Southern State	1st

== After the season ==
=== 2008 NFL draft ===
The following Golden Hurricane player was selected in the 2008 NFL draft following the season.

Round	Pick	Player	Position	NFL club
7	228	Chris Chamberlain	Defensive back	St. Louis Rams
