= Michael Merritt (American football) =

American football player (born 1984)

No. 45
- Position: Fullback

Personal information
- Born: September 3, 1984 (age 42); West Palm Beach, Florida, U.S.
- Died: December 17, 2022; Florida State Road 417, U.S.
- Listed height: 6 ft 4 in (1.93 m)
- Listed weight: 263 lb (119 kg)

Career information
- College: UCF
- NFL draft: 2008: 7th round, 239th overall pick

Career history
- Kansas City Chiefs (2008); Tampa Bay Storm (2011)*
- * Offseason or practice squad member only
- Stats at Pro Football Reference
- Stats at ArenaFan.com

Michael Antoine Merritt (born September 3, 1984) is an American former professional football fullback. He was selected by the Kansas City Chiefs in the seventh round of the 2008 NFL draft with the 239th overall pick. He played college football at UCF. Merritt never played for the Chiefs in the 2008 season and was released in the 2009 off-season.
