= 2007 Marshall Thundering Herd football team =

American college football season

2007 Marshall Thundering Herd football
- Conference: Conference USA
- East
- Record: 3–9 (3–5 C-USA)
- Head coach: Mark Snyder (3rd season)
- Defensive coordinator: Steve Dunlap (1st season)
- Home stadium: Joan C. Edwards Stadium (Capacity: 38,019)

2007 Conference USA football standings
	Conf.			Overall
Team	W		L	W		L
East Division
UCF x$	7	–	1	10	–	4
East Carolina	6	–	2	8	–	5
Memphis	6	–	2	7	–	6
Southern Miss	5	–	3	7	–	6
Marshall	3	–	5	3	–	9
UAB	1	–	7	2	–	10
West Division
Tulsa xy	6	–	2	10	–	4
Houston x	6	–	2	8	–	5
Tulane	3	–	5	4	–	8
Rice	3	–	5	3	–	9
UTEP	2	–	6	4	–	8
SMU	0	–	8	1	–	11
Championship: UCF 44, Tulsa 25
$ – Conference champion; x – Division champion/co-champions; y – Championship game participant; Rankings from AP Poll

The 2007 Marshall Thundering Herd football team represented Marshall University during the 2007 NCAA Division I FBS football season. Marshall competed as a member of the East Division of Conference USA (C-USA), and played their home games at Joan C. Edwards Stadium. The Thundering Herd finished the season 3–9, 3–5 in C-USA play.

== 2007 season ==
Date	Time	Opponent	Site	TV	Result	Attendance
September 1	12:00 pm	at Miami*	Orange Bowl; Miami, FL	ESPNU	L 3–31	39,830
September 8	11:00 am	No. 3 West Virginia*	Joan C. Edwards Stadium; Huntington, WV (Friends of Coal Bowl)	ESPN2	L 23–48	40,383
September 15	4:30 pm	No. 12 (FCS) New Hampshire*	Joan C. Edwards Stadium; Huntington, WV		L 35–48	27,255
September 22	7:30 pm	at Cincinnati*	Nippert Stadium; Cincinnati, OH	WOWK	L 14–40	35,097
October 2	8:00 pm	at Memphis	Liberty Bowl Memorial Stadium; Memphis, TN	ESPN2	L 21–24	25,324
October 13	7:00 pm	at Tulsa	Chapman Stadium; Tulsa, OK	WOWK	L 31–38	20,255
October 21	8:00 pm	Southern Miss	Joan C. Edwards Stadium; Huntington, WV	ESPN	L 24–33	27,234
October 27	4:30 pm	Rice	Joan C. Edwards Stadium; Huntington, WV	CSTV	W 34–21	31,768
November 3	3:30 pm	at UCF	Bright House Networks Stadium; Orlando, FL	CSS	L 13–47	46,103
November 10	4:30 pm	East Carolina	Joan C. Edwards Stadium; Huntington, WV (rivalry)	MASN	W 26–7	26,718
November 17	3:30 pm	at Houston	Robertson Stadium; Houston, TX	WOWK	L 28–35	21,116
November 24	4:30 pm	UAB	Joan C. Edwards Stadium; Huntington, WV		W 46–39	26,762
*Non-conference game; Rankings from AP Poll released prior to the game; All times are in Eastern time
