= Arkansas State Red Wolves football statistical leaders =

The Arkansas State Red Wolves football statistical leaders are individual statistical leaders of the Arkansas State Red Wolves football program in various categories, including passing, rushing, receiving, total offense, defensive stats, and kicking. Within those areas, the lists identify single-game, single-season, and career leaders. The Red Wolves represent Arkansas State University in the NCAA's Sun Belt Conference.

Although Arkansas State began competing in intercollegiate football in 1911, the school's official record book does not generally include listings from before the 1950s, as records from before this year are often incomplete and inconsistent.

These lists are dominated by more recent players for several reasons:

- Since the 1950s, seasons have increased from 10 games to 11 and then 12 games in length.
- The NCAA didn't allow freshmen to play varsity football until 1972 (with the exception of the World War II years), allowing players to have four-year careers.
- Bowl games only began counting toward single-season and career statistics in 2002. The Red Wolves have played in eight bowl games since this decision, giving many recent players an extra game to accumulate statistics.

These lists are updated through the end of the 2025 season.

== Passing ==
=== Passing yards ===
Career
| Rk | Player | Yards | Years |
|---|---|---|---|
| 1 | Ryan Aplin | 10,758 | 2009 2010 2011 2012 |
| 2 | Justice Hansen | 10,133 | 2016 2017 2018 |
| 3 | Jaylen Raynor | 8,694 | 2023 2024 2025 |
| 4 | Cleo Lemon | 7,706 | 1997 1998 1999 2000 |
| 5 | Layne Hatcher | 7,427 | 2019 2020 2021 |
| 6 | Corey Leonard | 7,319 | 2006 2007 2008 2009 |
| 7 | James Hamilton | 5,383 | 1968 1969 1970 1971 |
| 8 | Fredi Knighten | 5,371 | 2012 2013 2014 2015 |
| 9 | Roy Johnson | 4,597 | 1988 1989 1990 1991 |
| 10 | Johnny Covington | 4,426 | 1992 1993 1994 1995 |

Single season
| Rk | Player | Yards | Year |
|---|---|---|---|
| 1 | Justice Hansen | 3,967 | 2017 |
| 2 | Ryan Aplin | 3,588 | 2011 |
| 3 | Justice Hansen | 3,447 | 2018 |
| 4 | Jaylen Raynor | 3,361 | 2025 |
| 5 | Ryan Aplin | 3,342 | 2012 |
| 6 | Fredi Knighten | 3,277 | 2014 |
| 7 | Layne Hatcher | 2,946 | 2019 |
| 8 | Ryan Aplin | 2,939 | 2010 |
| 9 | Jaylen Raynor | 2,783 | 2024 |
| 10 | Cleo Lemon | 2,721 | 1998 |

Single game
| Rk | Player | Yards | Year | Opponent |
|---|---|---|---|---|
| 1 | Justice Hansen | 520 | 2017 | Louisiana–Monroe |
| 2 | Layne Hatcher | 444 | 2021 | UL Monroe |
| 3 | Layne Hatcher | 440 | 2019 | Troy |
| 4 | Ryan Aplin | 438 | 2010 | Louisiana-Lafayette |
| 5 | Justice Hansen | 437 | 2017 | Troy |
| 6 | Justice Hansen | 424 | 2016 | Central Arkansas |
| 7 | Justice Hansen | 423 | 2018 | Southeast Missouri State |
| 8 | Nick Noce | 418 | 2004 | Memphis |
| | Trey Owens | 418 | 2026 | South Alabama |
| 10 | Justice Hansen | 415 | 2017 | Nebraska |

=== Passing touchdowns ===
Career
| Rk | Player | TDs | Years |
|---|---|---|---|
| 1 | Justice Hansen | 83 | 2016 2017 2018 |
| 2 | Ryan Aplin | 67 | 2009 2010 2011 2012 |
| 3 | Layne Hatcher | 65 | 2019 2020 2021 |
| 4 | Jaylen Raynor | 52 | 2023 2024 2025 |
| 5 | Cleo Lemon | 48 | 1997 1998 1999 2000 |
| 6 | Corey Leonard | 47 | 2006 2007 2008 2009 |
| 7 | Fredi Knighten | 46 | 2012 2013 2014 2015 |
| 8 | James Hamilton | 32 | 1968 1969 1970 1971 |
| 9 | Nick Noce | 25 | 2003 2004 2005 |
| 10 | Johnny Covington | 24 | 1992 1993 1994 1995 |

Single season
| Rk | Player | TDs | Year |
|---|---|---|---|
| 1 | Justice Hansen | 37 | 2017 |
| 2 | Justice Hansen | 27 | 2018 |
| | Layne Hatcher | 27 | 2019 |
| 4 | Ryan Aplin | 24 | 2012 |
| | Fredi Knighten | 24 | 2014 |
| 6 | Ryan Aplin | 21 | 2010 |
| 7 | Ryan Aplin | 19 | 2011 |
| | Fredi Knighten | 19 | 2015 |
| | Justice Hansen | 19 | 2016 |
| | Layne Hatcher | 19 | 2020 |
| | Layne Hatcher | 19 | 2021 |
| | Jaylen Raynor | 19 | 2025 |

Single game
| Rk | Player | TDs | Year | Opponent |
|---|---|---|---|---|
| 1 | Justice Hansen | 6 | 2018 | Southeast Missouri State |
| | Jaylen Raynor | 6 | 2023 | Massachusetts |
| 3 | Corey Leonard | 5 | 2007 | Louisiana-Lafayette |
| | Fredi Knighten | 5 | 2014 | Toledo (GoDaddy Bowl) |
| | Fredi Knighten | 5 | 2015 | Louisiana-Monroe |
| | Justice Hansen | 5 | 2017 | Arkansas–Pine Bluff |
| | Justice Hansen | 5 | 2017 | Louisiana–Monroe |
| | Layne Hatcher | 5 | 2020 | UL Monroe |

== Rushing ==
=== Rushing yards ===
Career
| Rk | Player | Yards | Years |
|---|---|---|---|
| 1 | Richie Woit | 3,947 | 1950 1951 1952 1953 |
| 2 | Reggie Arnold | 3,933 | 2006 2007 2008 2009 |
| 3 | Antonio Warren | 3,040 | 2002 2003 2004 2005 |
| 4 | Jonathan Adams | 3,005 | 1998 1999 2000 2001 |
| 5 | Michael Gordon | 2,961 | 2012 2013 2014 2015 |
| 6 | Rickey Jemison | 2,956 | 1983 1984 1985 1986 |
| 7 | Calvin Harrell | 2,935 | 1968 1969 1970 1971 |
| 8 | Lamont Zachery | 2,640 | 1996 1997 1998 1999 |
| 9 | Richard Kimble | 2,518 | 1986 1987 1988 1989 |
| 10 | Corey Walker | 2,340 | 1993 1994 1995 1996 |

Single season
| Rk | Player | Yards | Year |
|---|---|---|---|
| 1 | Danny Smith | 1,390 | 2002 |
| 2 | Richie Woit | 1,250 | 1952 |
| 3 | Frank McGuigan | 1,220 | 1968 |
| 4 | Dennis Bolden | 1,191 | 1975 |
| 5 | Calvin Harrell | 1,131 | 1970 |
| 6 | Richie Woit | 1,125 | 1951 |
| 7 | David Oku | 1,105 | 2012 |
| 8 | Michael Gordon | 1,100 | 2014 |
| 9 | Reggie Arnold | 1,076 | 2006 |
| 10 | Reggie Arnold | 1,074 | 2008 |

Single game
| Rk | Player | Yards | Year | Opponent |
|---|---|---|---|---|
| 1 | Dennis Bolden | 259 | 1975 | McNeese State |

=== Rushing touchdowns ===
Career
| Rk | Player | TDs | Years |
|---|---|---|---|
| 1 | Richie Woit | 57 | 1950 1951 1952 1953 |
| 2 | Dwane Brown | 33 | 1984 1985 1986 1987 |
| | Reggie Arnold | 33 | 2006 2007 2008 2009 |
| 4 | Michael Gordon | 32 | 2012 2013 2014 2015 |
| 5 | Ryan Aplin | 31 | 2009 2010 2011 2012 |
| 6 | Calvin Harrell | 26 | 1968 1969 1970 1971 |
| 7 | Lamont Zachery | 24 | 1996 1997 1998 1999 |
| 8 | Roy Johnson | 22 | 1988 1989 1990 1991 |
| | David Oku | 22 | 2012 2013 |

Single season
| Rk | Player | TDs | Year |
|---|---|---|---|
| 1 | Richie Woit | 21 | 1951 |
| 2 | Richie Woit | 17 | 1952 |
| 3 | David Hines | 16 | 1975 |
| | David Oku | 16 | 2012 |
| 5 | Frank McGuigan | 14 | 1968 |
| | Danny Smith | 14 | 2002 |
| | Johnston White | 14 | 2015 |
| 8 | Michael Gordon | 13 | 2014 |

Single game
| Rk | Player | TDs | Year | Opponent |
|---|---|---|---|---|
| 1 | Clifton Keller | 7 | 1917 | Central Arkansas |
| | Steve Burks | 7 | 1973 | Abilene Christian |
| 3 | Michael Gordon | 5 | 2014 | Idaho |
| 4 | David Hines | 4 | 1975 | Northwest Louisiana |
| | Rickey Jemison | 4 | 1984 | Northeast Louisiana |
| | Earl Easley | 4 | 1988 | Southern Illinois |
| | Danny Smith | 4 | 2002 | Idaho |
| | Reggie Arnold | 4 | 2009 | Mississippi Valley State |
| | Ryan Aplin | 4 | 2011 | Florida Atlantic |

== Receiving ==
=== Receptions ===
Career
| Rk | Player | Rec | Years |
|---|---|---|---|
| 1 | J. D. McKissic | 289 | 2012 2013 2014 2015 |
| 2 | Corey Rucker | 255 | 2020 2021 2023 2024 2025 |
| 3 | Omar Bayless | 177 | 2016 2017 2018 2019 |
| 4 | Jonathan Adams Jr. | 166 | 2017 2018 2019 2020 |
| 5 | Dwayne Frampton | 163 | 2010 2011 |
| 6 | Robert Kilow | 158 | 1998 1999 2000 |
| 7 | Lennie Johnson | 156 | 1995 1996 1997 1998 |
| 8 | Kirk Merritt | 153 | 2018 2019 |
| 9 | Levi Dejohnette | 152 | 2004 2005 2006 2007 |
| 10 | Taylor Stockemer | 129 | 2009 2010 2011 2012 |

Single season
| Rk | Player | Rec | Year |
|---|---|---|---|
| 1 | J. D. McKissic | 103 | 2012 |
| 2 | Dwayne Frampton | 94 | 2011 |
| 3 | Omar Bayless | 93 | 2019 |
| 4 | Kirk Merritt | 83 | 2018 |
| 5 | J. D. McKissic | 82 | 2013 |
| 6 | Jonathan Adams Jr. | 79 | 2020 |
| 7 | Corey Rucker | 75 | 2025 |
| 8 | Chauncy Cobb | 73 | 2025 |
| 9 | Robert Kilow | 72 | 2000 |
| 10 | Kirk Merritt | 70 | 2019 |

Single game
| Rk | Player | Rec | Year | Opponent |
|---|---|---|---|---|
| 1 | J. D. McKissic | 15 | 2013 | Missouri |
| | Jonathan Adams Jr. | 15 | 2020 | Georgia State |
| 3 | Dwayne Frampton | 13 | 2011 | Louisiana-Monroe |
| | Josh Jarboe | 13 | 2012 | Oregon |
| 5 | Dwayne Frampton | 12 | 2010 | Indiana |
| | J. D. McKissic | 12 | 2012 | Louisiana-Monroe |
| | J. D. McKissic | 12 | 2012 | Troy |
| | Brandon Bowling | 12 | 2019 | SMU |
| | Corey Rucker | 12 | 2024 | Troy |
| | Chauncy Cobb | 12 | 2025 | Georgia Southern |

=== Receiving yards ===
Career
| Rk | Player | Yards | Years |
|---|---|---|---|
| 1 | Corey Rucker | 4,059 | 2020 2021 2023 2024 2025 |
| 2 | J. D. McKissic | 2,826 | 2012 2013 2014 2015 |
| 3 | Omar Bayless | 2,775 | 2016 2017 2018 2019 |
| 4 | Lennie Johnson | 2,730 | 1995 1996 1997 1998 |
| 5 | Robert Kilow | 2,446 | 1998 1999 2000 |
| 6 | Jonathan Adams Jr. | 2,306 | 2017 2018 2019 2020 |
| 7 | Taylor Stockemer | 2,146 | 2009 2010 2011 2012 |
| 8 | Jeff Foreman | 2,067 | 2019 2020 2021 2022 2023 |
| 9 | Dwayne Frampton | 1,894 | 2010 2011 |
| 10 | Levi Dejohnette | 1,816 | 2004 2005 2006 2007 |

Single season
| Rk | Player | Yards | Year |
|---|---|---|---|
| 1 | Omar Bayless | 1,653 | 2019 |
| 2 | Dwayne Frampton | 1,156 | 2011 |
| 3 | Jonathan Adams Jr. | 1,111 | 2020 |
| 4 | Corey Rucker | 1,053 | 2024 |
| 5 | Corey Rucker | 1,032 | 2025 |
| 6 | J. D. McKissic | 1,022 | 2012 |
| 7 | Kirk Merritt | 1,005 | 2018 |
| 8 | Robert Kilow | 1,002 | 2000 |
| 9 | Chet Douthit | 955 | 1970 |
| 10 | Lennie Johnson | 901 | 1998 |

Single game
| Rk | Player | Yards | Year | Opponent |
|---|---|---|---|---|
| 1 | Corey Rucker | 310 | 2020 | UL Monroe |
| 2 | Lennie Johnson | 284 | 1997 | Southwest Missouri State |
| 3 | Robert Kilow | 254 | 1999 | Ole Miss |
| 4 | Omar Bayless | 213 | 2019 | Troy |
| 5 | Justin McInnis | 211 | 2017 | Louisiana–Monroe |
| 6 | Jeff Foreman | 198 | 2021 | Memphis |
| 7 | Dikki Dyson | 196 | 1977 | Louisiana Tech |
| 8 | Corey Rucker | 193 | 2024 | Troy |
| 9 | Chet Douthit | 188 | 1970 | Louisiana Tech |
| 10 | Taylor Stockemer | 185 | 2011 | Northern Illinois (GoDaddy.com Bowl) |

=== Receiving touchdowns ===
Career
| Rk | Player | TDs | Years |
|---|---|---|---|
| 1 | Corey Rucker | 27 | 2020 2021 2023 2024 2025 |
| 2 | Omar Bayless | 26 | 2016 2017 2018 2019 |
| 3 | Jonathan Adams Jr. | 21 | 2017 2018 2019 2020 |
| 4 | Kirk Merritt | 19 | 2018 2019 |
| 5 | Taylor Stockemer | 16 | 2009 2010 2011 2012 |
| 6 | John Koldus | 15 | 1950 1951 1952 |
| 7 | Tres Houston | 14 | 2013 2014 2015 |
| 8 | Alfred Bentley | 13 | 1959 1960 |
| | Chris Murray | 13 | 2015 2016 2017 |
| | Jeff Foreman | 13 | 2019 2020 2021 2022 2023 |

Single season
| Rk | Player | TDs | Year |
|---|---|---|---|
| 1 | Omar Bayless | 17 | 2019 |
| 2 | Kirk Merritt | 12 | 2019 |
| | Jonathan Adams Jr. | 12 | 2020 |
| 4 | John Koldus | 10 | 1951 |
| | Alfred Bentley | 10 | 1959 |
| | Tres Houston | 10 | 2015 |
| 7 | Chris Murray | 9 | 2017 |
| | Corey Rucker | 9 | 2021 |
| 9 | Taylor Stockemer | 7 | 2011 |
| | Julian Jones | 7 | 2012 |
| | Kendall Sanders | 7 | 2016 |
| | Blake Mack | 7 | 2017 |
| | Kirk Merritt | 7 | 2018 |
| | Brandon Bowling | 7 | 2020 |
| | Courtney Jackson | 7 | 2023 |
| | Corey Rucker | 7 | 2024 |

Single game
| Rk | Player | TDs | Year | Opponent |
|---|---|---|---|---|
| 1 | Alfred Bentley | 4 | 1959 | Central Missouri State |
| | Omar Bayless | 4 | 2019 | SMU |
| | Corey Rucker | 4 | 2020 | UL Monroe |
| 4 | Booker Mays | 3 | 2014 | Toledo (GoDaddy Bowl) |
| | Tres Houston | 3 | 2015 | Louisiana-Monroe |
| | Omar Bayless | 3 | 2019 | Georgia State |
| | Jonathan Adams Jr. | 3 | 2020 | Kansas State |
| | Corey Rucker | 3 | 2021 | Central Arkansas |

== Total offense ==
Total offense is the sum of passing and rushing statistics. It does not include receiving or returns.

=== Total offense yards ===
Career
| Rk | Player | Yards | Years |
|---|---|---|---|
| 1 | Ryan Aplin | 12,514 | 2009 2010 2011 2012 |
| 2 | Justice Hansen | 11,097 | 2016 2017 2018 |
| 3 | Jaylen Raynor | 9,877 | 2023 2024 2025 |
| 4 | Corey Leonard | 8,887 | 2006 2007 2008 2009 |
| 5 | Layne Hatcher | 7,434 | 2019 2020 2021 |
| 6 | Cleo Lemon | 7,309 | 1997 1998 1999 2000 |
| 7 | Fredi Knighten | 6,986 | 2012 2013 2014 2015 |
| 8 | Roy Johnson | 6,779 | 1988 1989 1990 1991 |
| 9 | James Hamilton | 5,764 | 1968 1969 1970 1971 |
| 10 | Dwane Brown | 5,672 | 1984 1985 1986 1987 |

Single season
| Rk | Player | Yards | Year |
|---|---|---|---|
| 1 | Justice Hansen | 4,390 | 2017 |
| 2 | Ryan Aplin | 4,176 | 2011 |
| 3 | Fredi Knighten | 4,056 | 2014 |
| 4 | Jaylen Raynor | 3,784 | 2025 |
| 5 | Ryan Aplin | 3,780 | 2012 |
| 6 | Ryan Aplin | 3,416 | 2010 |
| 7 | Jaylen Raynor | 3,170 | 2024 |
| 8 | Layne Hatcher | 2,992 | 2019 |
| 9 | Jaylen Raynor | 2,923 | 2023 |
| 10 | Adam Kennedy | 2,887 | 2013 |

Single game
| Rk | Player | Yards | Year | Opponent |
|---|---|---|---|---|
| 1 | Justice Hansen | 550 | 2017 | Louisiana–Monroe |
| 2 | Justice Hansen | 489 | 2017 | Troy |
| 3 | Layne Hatcher | 460 | 2019 | Troy |
| 4 | Ryan Aplin | 454 | 2012 | Troy |
| | Justice Hansen | 454 | 2018 | Southeast Missouri State |
| 6 | Fredi Knighten | 449 | 2014 | New Mexico State |
| 7 | Trey Owens | 446 | 2026 | South Alabama |
| 8 | Ryan Aplin | 442 | 2010 | Louisiana-Lafayette |
| | Layne Hatcher | 442 | 2021 | UL Monroe |
| 10 | Justice Hansen | 440 | 2016 | Louisiana-Lafayette |

=== Touchdowns responsible for ===
"Touchdowns responsible for" is the NCAA's official term for combined passing and rushing touchdowns.

Career
| Rk | Player | TDs | Years |
|---|---|---|---|
| 1 | Ryan Aplin | 98 | 2009 2010 2011 2012 |
| 2 | Fredi Knighten | 67 | 2012 2013 2014 2015 |
| | Layne Hatcher | 67 | 2019 2020 2021 |
| | Jaylen Raynor | 67 | 2023 2024 2025 |
| 5 | Justice Hansen | 64 | 2016 2017 |
| 6 | Corey Leonard | 58 | 2006 2007 2008 2009 |
| 7 | Richie Woit | 57 | 1950 1951 1952 1953 |
| 8 | Cleo Lemon | 51 | 1997 1998 1999 2000 |
| 9 | Roy Johnson | 44 | 1988 1989 1990 1991 |
| 10 | Elliot Jacobs | 37 | 2001 2002 2003 |

Single season
| Rk | Player | TDs | Year |
|---|---|---|---|
| 1 | Justice Hansen | 44 | 2017 |
| 2 | Fredi Knighten | 35 | 2014 |
| 3 | Ryan Aplin | 32 | 2010 |
| 4 | Ryan Aplin | 30 | 2012 |
| 5 | Ryan Aplin | 29 | 2011 |
| 6 | Layne Hatcher | 28 | 2019 |
| 7 | Jaylen Raynor | 26 | 2025 |
| 8 | Fredi Knighten | 24 | 2015 |
| 9 | Jaylen Raynor | 22 | 2023 |
| 10 | Richie Woit | 21 | 1951 |
| | Corey Leonard | 21 | 2007 |

== Defense ==
=== Interceptions ===
Career
| Rk | Player | Ints | Years |
|---|---|---|---|
| 1 | Dennis Meyer | 27 | 1968 1969 1970 1971 |
| 2 | Dick Ritchey | 19 | 1964 1965 1966 1967 |
| 3 | Terry Whiting | 16 | 1968 1969 1970 1971 |
| 4 | Johnathan Burke | 15 | 2002 2003 |
| 5 | Orley Massena | 14 | 1966 1967 1968 1969 |
| | Al Johnson | 14 | 1988 1989 1990 |

Single season
| Rk | Player | Ints | Year |
|---|---|---|---|
| 1 | Dennis Meyer | 11 | 1970 |
| 2 | Johnathan Burke | 9 | 2003 |
| 3 | Dick Ritchey | 8 | 1965 |
| 4 | Dennis Meyer | 7 | 1969 |
| | Jerome Sims | 7 | 1983 |
| 6 | Orley Massena | 6 | 1969 |
| | Greg Lee | 6 | 1985 |
| | Al Johnson | 6 | 1989 |
| | Chappell Mitchell | 6 | 1998 |
| | Tyrell Johnson | 6 | 2007 |
| | Rocky Hayes | 6 | 2015 |

Single game
| Rk | Player | Ints | Year | Opponent |
|---|---|---|---|---|
| 1 | Dick Ritchey | 3 | 1965 | Abilene Christian |
| | Dennis Meyer | 3 | 1969 | Drake |
| | David Walls | 3 | 1969 | UT-Arlington |
| | Greg Lee | 3 | 1985 | UT-Arlington |
| | Tyrone Jones | 3 | 1988 | Akron |
| | Chappell Mitchell | 3 | 1998 | Southwest Louisiana |

=== Tackles ===
Career
| Rk | Player | Tackles | Years |
|---|---|---|---|
| 1 | Jerry Muckensturm | 493 | 1972 1973 1974 1975 |
| 2 | Bill Bergey | 436 | 1965 1966 1967 1968 |
| 3 | Ron Smith | 422 | 1976 1977 1978 1979 |
| 4 | Qushaun Lee | 393 | 2011 2012 2013 2014 |
| 5 | Mike Malham | 370 | 1972 1973 1974 1975 |
| 6 | Mike Morris | 366 | 1979 1980 1981 1982 |

Single season
| Rk | Player | Tackles | Year |
|---|---|---|---|
| 1 | Bill Bergey | 196 | 1968 |
| 2 | Jerry Muckensturm | 155 | 1972 |
| 3 | Ron Smith | 151 | 1979 |
| 4 | Bill Bergey | 136 | 1967 |
| 5 | Qushaun Lee | 134 | 2013 |
| 6 | Mike Malham | 131 | 1974 |
| | Jerry Muckensturm | 131 | 1975 |
| | Wesley Williams | 131 | 1978 |

Single game
| Rk | Player | Tackles | Year | Opponent |
|---|---|---|---|---|
| 1 | Bill Bergey | 33 | 1968 | Eastern Michigan |
| 2 | Tyrell Johnson | 25 | 2005 | North Texas |
| 3 | Jordan Boyd | 23 | 1982 | Chattanooga |
| 4 | Foot Daley | 22 | 1988 | Delta State |
| | Derrick Toney | 22 | 1991 | Colo State |
| 6 | Cedric Buckley | 21 | 1991 | Akron |
| | Andy Henault | 21 | 1998 | New Mexico State |
| 8 | Jerry Muckensturm | 20 | 1972 | Chattanooga |
| | Ron Smith | 20 | 1979 | Lamar |
| | Dan Miller | 20 | 1986 | Memphis State |
| | Michael Beason | 20 | 1991 | Southwestern Louisiana |

=== Sacks ===
Career
| Rk | Player | Sacks | Years |
|---|---|---|---|
| 1 | Ja’Von Rolland-Jones | 43.5 | 2014 2015 2016 2017 |
| 2 | Marvin Neloms | 28.0 | 1983 1984 1985 1986 |
| 3 | Alex Carrington | 21.5 | 2006 2007 2008 2009 |
| 4 | Charlie Fredrick | 21.0 | 1984 1985 1986 1987 |
| | Clarence Williams | 21.0 | 1995 1996 1997 1998 |
| 6 | Robert Speer | 19.0 | 1973 1974 1975 1976 |
| 7 | Glen Koenig | 17.0 | 1976 1977 1978 1979 |
| | Bryan Hall | 17.0 | 2006 2007 2008 2009 |
| | Brandon Joiner | 17.0 | 2010 2011 |

Single season
| Rk | Player | Sacks | Year |
|---|---|---|---|
| 1 | Lynn Rowland | 14.0 | 1989 |
| 2 | Ja’Von Rolland-Jones | 13.5 | 2016 |
| 3 | Brandon Joiner | 13.0 | 2011 |
| | Ja’Von Rolland-Jones | 13.0 | 2017 |
| 5 | Chris Odom | 12.0 | 2016 |
| 6 | Carter Ray Crawford | 11.0 | 1984 |
| | Marvin Neloms | 11.0 | 1985 |
| 8 | Alex Carrington | 10.5 | 2008 |
| 9 | Robert Speer | 10.0 | 1976 |
| | Clarence Williams | 10.0 | 1998 |

Single game
| Rk | Player | Sacks | Year | Opponent |
|---|---|---|---|---|
| 1 | Ja’Von Rolland-Jones | 5.0 | 2014 | 0 |
| 2 | Corey Williams | 4.0 | 2002 | Tulsa |
| | Marvin Neloms | 4.0 | 1984 | Chattanooga |
| | Alex Carrington | 4.0 | 2009 | WKU |
| | Brandon Joiner | 4.0 | 2011 | Louisiana-Lafayette |

== Kicking ==
=== Field goals made ===
Career
| Rk | Player | FGs | Years |
|---|---|---|---|
| 1 | Blake Grupe | 64 | 2018 2019 2020 2021 |
| 2 | Josh Arauco | 58 | 2006 2007 2008 2009 |
| 3 | Brian Davis | 56 | 2010 2011 2012 2013 |
| 4 | Clune Van Andel | 42 | 2023 2024 2025 |
| 5 | Jeff Caldwell | 40 | 1993 1994 1995 1996 |
| 6 | Eric Neihouse | 37 | 2002 2003 2004 2005 |
| 7 | Doug Dobbs | 35 | 1976 1977 1978 1979 |
| 8 | Dominic Zvada | 34 | 2022 2023 |
| 9 | Scott Roper | 32 | 1986 1987 |
| 10 | Jeff Caldwell | 28 | 1993 1994 1995 |

Single season
| Rk | Player | FGs | Year |
|---|---|---|---|
| 1 | Scott Roper | 21 | 1986 |
| | Clune Van Andel | 21 | 2024 |
| | Clune Van Andel | 21 | 2025 |
| 4 | Blake Grupe | 20 | 2021 |
| 5 | Blake Grupe | 19 | 2019 |
| 6 | Brian Davis | 18 | 2011 |
| 7 | Doug Dobbs | 17 | 1978 |
| | Josh Arauco | 17 | 2008 |
| | Brian Davis | 17 | 2012 |
| | Dominic Zvada | 17 | 2022 |
| | Dominic Zvada | 17 | 2023 |

Single game
| Rk | Player | FGs | Year | Opponent |
|---|---|---|---|---|
| 1 | Brian Davis | 6 | 2011 | Central Arkansas |
| 2 | Scott Roper | 5 | 1986 | North Texas |
| | Brian Davis | 5 | 2012 | Louisiana-Lafayette |
| 4 | S McDonald | 4 | 1981 | Central Michigan |
| | Scott Roper | 4 | 1986 | Northeast Louisiana |
| | Josh Arauco | 4 | 2008 | Texas A&M |
| | Josh Arauco | 4 | 2009 | Florida Atlantic |
| | Brian Davis | 4 | 2013 | Missouri |
| | J. D. Houston | 4 | 2015 | Appalachian State |
| | Dominic Zvada | 4 | 2022 | Ohio State |
| | Clune Van Andel | 4 | 2024 | South Alabama |
| | Clune Van Andel | 4 | 2024 | Troy |
