= List of Arkansas State Red Wolves in the NFL draft =

This is a list of Arkansas State Red Wolves football players in the NFL draft.

== Key ==
B	Back	K	Kicker	NT	Nose tackle
C	Center	LB	Linebacker	FB	Fullback
DB	Defensive back	P	Punter	HB	Halfback
DE	Defensive end	QB	Quarterback	WR	Wide receiver
DT	Defensive tackle	RB	Running back	G	Guard
E	End	T	Offensive tackle	TE	Tight end

== Selections ==
Year	Round	Pick	Player	Team	Position
1949	11	103	Harry Larche	Green Bay Packers	T
1954	25	301	Richie Woit	Detroit Lions	B
1956	15	179	Tom Spiers	Chicago Cardinals	QB
1957	30	353	Don Serier	Pittsburgh Steelers	E
1968	10	272	Ron Worthen	Green Bay Packers	C
1969	2	31	Bill Bergey	Cincinnati Bengals	LB
1969	14	348	Gary Crane	Denver Broncos	LB
1970	3	62	Clovis Swinney	New Orleans Saints	DE
1972	3	58	Bill Phillips	Denver Broncos	LB
1972	6	137	Wayne Dorton	New Orleans Saints	G
1972	6	143	Dennis Meyer	Pittsburgh Steelers	DB
1972	7	180	Calvin Harrell	Miami Dolphins	RB
1972	12	293	Steve Lockhart	New Orleans Saints	TE
1973	5	110	Wallace Francis	Buffalo Bills	WR
1973	7	163	Benny Shepherd	Miami Dolphins	RB
1974	15	371	Vince Ancell	St. Louis Cardinals	DB
1974	17	422	Doug Lowrey	New York Jets	G
1975	2	49	Stan Winfrey	Miami Dolphins	RB
1975	4	91	Steve Burks	New England Patriots	WR
1975	8	207	Joe Hollimon	Minnesota Vikings	DB
1976	2	45	Ken Jones	Buffalo Bills	G
1976	7	184	Dick Dixon	Seattle Seahawks	DT
1976	7	190	Jerry Muckensturm	Chicago Bears	LB
1976	9	260	Jim Lisko	Denver Broncos	LB
1976	15	417	Eddie Morgan	New York Giants	DT
1976	17	469	Mike Malham	Chicago Bears	LB
1977	5	123	Leroy Harris	Miami Dolphins	RB
1977	9	229	T. J. Humphreys	Philadelphia Eagles	G
1977	9	233	Joel Mullins	Green Bay Packers	T
1977	9	242	Robert Speer	Atlanta Falcons	DE
1977	10	268	Oren Middlebrook	Denver Broncos	WR
1980	2	37	Gene Bradley	Buffalo Bills	QB
1983	12	319	Waddell Kelly	New England Patriots	RB
1984	2	38	Bill Johnson	Cincinnati Bengals	RB
1985	8	221	Judious Lewis	Seattle Seahawks	WR
1986	8	201	Ray Brown	St. Louis Cardinals	G
1986	8	210	Michael Cline	Green Bay Packers	DT
1987	3	67	Mike Adams	New Orleans Saints	DB
1987	11	292	Elbert Shelley	Atlanta Falcons	DB
1989	5	129	Tim Smiley	Washington Redskins	DB
1990	3	77	Fred Barnett	Philadelphia Eagles	WR
1991	9	228	Jeff Fields	Los Angeles Rams	DT
1995s	3	0	Darren Benson	Dallas Cowboys	DT
1996	7	242	Carlos Emmons	Pittsburgh Steelers	LB
2004	6	179	Corey Williams	Green Bay Packers	DT
2007	6	175	Oren O'Neal	Oakland Raiders	RB
2008	2	43	Tyrell Johnson	Minnesota Vikings	DB
2009	7	241	David Johnson	Pittsburgh Steelers	TE
2010	3	72	Alex Carrington	Buffalo Bills	DE
2011	7	214	Derek Newton	Houston Texans	T
2012	3	77	Demario Davis	New York Jets	LB
2013	7	250	Don Jones	Miami Dolphins	DB
2014	5	165	Ryan Carrethers	San Diego Chargers	DT
