= Demario Davis =

American football player (born 1989)

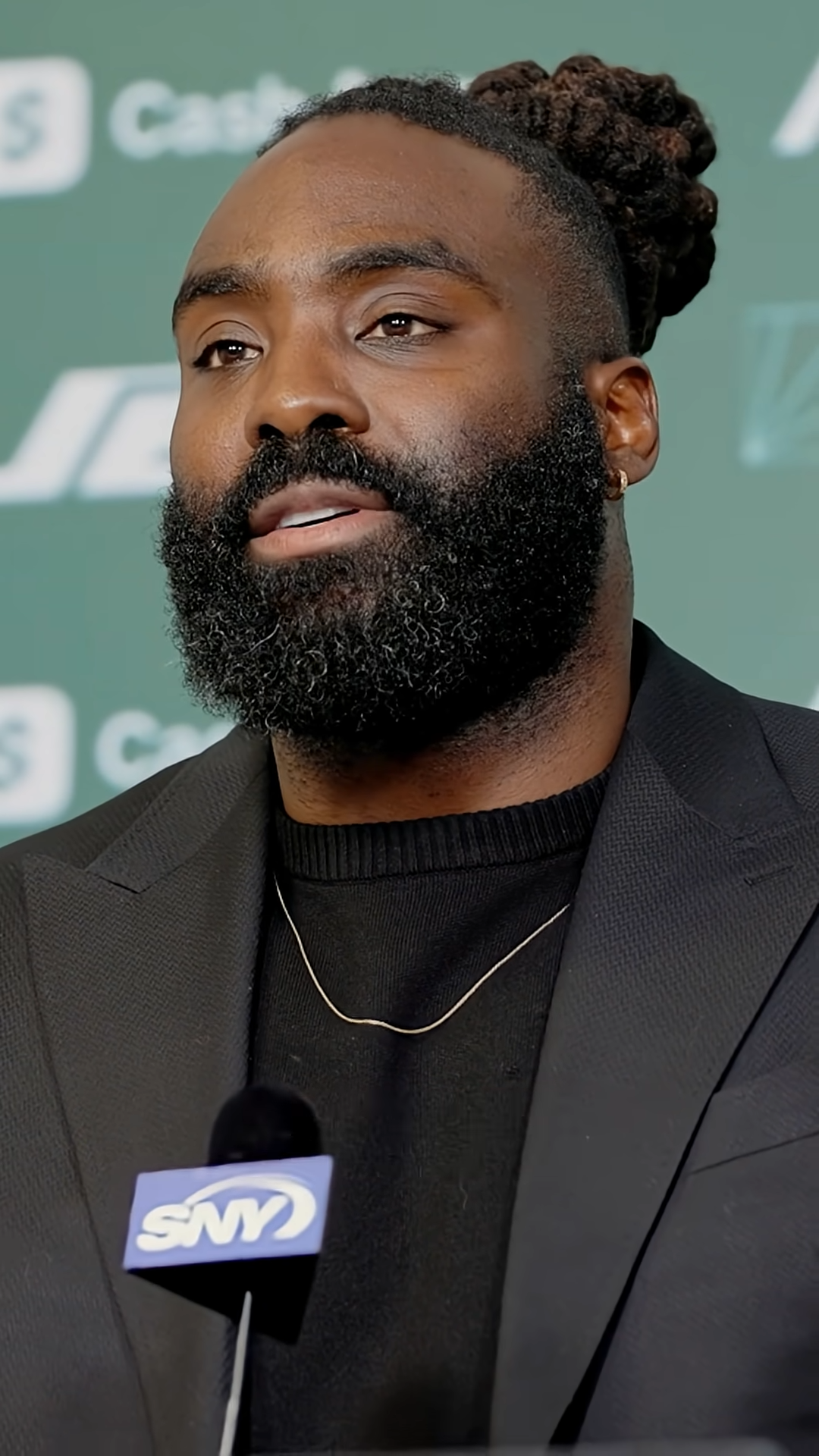
- Davis with the New York Jets in 2026

No. 56 – New York Jets
- Position: Linebacker
- Roster status: Active

Personal information
- Born: January 11, 1989 (age 37); Collins, Mississippi, U.S.
- Listed height: 6 ft 2 in (1.88 m)
- Listed weight: 239 lb (108 kg)

Career information
- High school: Brandon (Brandon, Mississippi)
- College: Arkansas State (2007–2011)
- NFL draft: 2012: 3rd round, 77th overall pick

Career history
- New York Jets (2012–2015); Cleveland Browns (2016); New York Jets (2017); New Orleans Saints (2018–2025); New York Jets (2026–present)

Awards and highlights
- First-team All-Pro (2019); 4× Second-team All-Pro (2020–2023); 2× Pro Bowl (2022, 2023); NFL solo tackles co-leader (2017); 2× First-team All-Sun Belt (2010, 2011)

Career NFL statistics as of Week 10, 2026
- Total tackles: 1,604
- Sacks: 47.0
- Forced fumbles: 6
- Fumble recoveries: 10
- Interceptions: 4
- Pass deflections: 65
- Stats at Pro Football Reference

Demario Davis (born January 11, 1989) is an American professional football linebacker for the New York Jets of the National Football League (NFL). He was selected by the Jets in the third round of the 2012 NFL draft. He played college football for the Arkansas State Red Wolves. Davis has also played for the Cleveland Browns and New Orleans Saints.

== Early life and college ==
Davis' mother gave birth to him when she was 16, and his father was a career enlisted soldier in the US Army and combat veteran. Davis attended Brandon High School in Brandon, Mississippi, where he was a three-sport athlete in football, basketball, and track. In football, he played mostly wide receiver as sophomore and junior, helping lead the team to its 14th playoff appearance in the last 16 years with a 7–5 record. As a senior, he recorded 81 tackles, six interceptions and one sack, while also receiving over 30 passes for 386 receiving yards with four scores. He was also a starter on the Brandon basketball team and competed as a high jumper with the varsity track & field team. He was named to the Clarion Ledger All-Metro team in football.

Davis played college football for the Arkansas State Red Wolves. He recorded a team-leading 80 tackles as a sophomore and earned various all-conference honors in his junior and senior years.

== Professional career ==
=== Pre-draft ===
Davis attended the NFL Scouting Combine in Indianapolis, Indiana and completed all of the combine and positional drills. On March 27, 2012, he attended Arkansas State's pro day and chose to perform the 40-yard dash (4.52s), 20-yard dash (2.72s), 10-yard dash (1.63s), vertical jump (38.5"), and positional drills. At the conclusion of the pre-draft process, Davis was projected to be a third-round pick by the majority of NFL draft experts and scouts. He was ranked as the ninth best outside linebacker prospect in the draft by DraftScout.com.

External videos
- Demario Davis' NFL Combine Workout

Pre-draft measurables
Height	Weight	Arm length	Hand span	Wingspan	40-yard dash	10-yard split	20-yard split	20-yard shuttle	Three-cone drill	Vertical jump	Broad jump	Bench press
6 ft 2 in (1.88 m)	235 lb (107 kg)	32 in (0.81 m)	9 in (0.23 m)	6 ft 5 1/4 in (1.96 m)	4.52 s	1.63 s	2.72 s	4.28 s	7.19 s	38.5 in (0.98 m)	10 ft 4 in (3.15 m)	32 reps
All values from NFL Combine/Arkansas' State's Pro Day

=== New York Jets (first stint) ===
==== 2012 ====
The New York Jets selected Davis in the third round (77th overall) of the 2012 NFL draft. Davis was the tenth linebacker drafted in 2012. On May 31, 2012, the Jets signed Davis to a four-year, $2.81 million contract with a signing bonus of $618,000.

External videos
- Draft Room Phone Call to Demario Davis

Throughout training camp, Davis competed against veteran Bart Scott for the job as the starting weakside linebacker. Head coach Rex Ryan named Davis the third-string backup weakside linebacker to start the regular season, behind Bart Scott and Josh Mauga.

He made his professional regular season debut in the Jets' season-opening 48–28 victory against the Buffalo Bills. On September 23, 2012, Davis made his first career tackle during a one-yard punt return by Marcus Thigpen in the first quarter of a 23–20 overtime victory at the Miami Dolphins in Week 3. In Week 6, Davis was promoted to the Jets' primary backup weakside linebacker role after Josh Mauga was placed on injured reserve after tearing a pectoral muscle the previous week. On October 21, 2012, Davis earned his first career start in place of Bart Scott and recorded a season-high seven combined tackles during a 29–26 loss at the New England Patriots in Week 7. He remained as the starting weakside linebacker for the next two games (Weeks 8–10) as Bart Scott recovered from a toe injury he sustained in Week 7. He finished his rookie season in 2012 with 36 combined tackles (31 solo) and a fumble recovery in 16 games and three starts. He registered 15 of his tackles while playing on special teams.

==== 2013 ====
Davis entered training camp slated as a starting inside linebacker after the Jets' new defensive coordinator Dennis Thurman switched from a base 4–3 defense to a base 3–4 defense. Head coach Rex Ryan named Davis and David Harris the starting inside linebackers to begin the regular season in 2013.

He started in the Jets' season-opener against the Tampa Bay Buccaneers and recorded eight combined tackles in their 18–17 victory. On September 22, 2013, Davis collected six combined tackles and made his first career sack during a 27–20 win against the Bills in Week 3. He sacked quarterback E. J. Manuel for a three-yard loss in the third quarter. On November 3, 2013, Davis made four tackles, deflected a pass, and made his first career interception during a 26–20 win against the New Orleans Saints in Week 9. He intercepted a pass thrown by quarterback Drew Brees that was originally intended for Benjamin Watson and was tackled for no gain in the first quarter. In Week 13, he collected a season-high ten combined tackles (six solo) in the Jets' 23–3 loss to the Dolphins. He finished the season with 107 combined tackles (63 solo), a pass deflection, a sack, and an interception in 16 games and 16 starts.

==== 2014 ====
Head coach Rex Ryan retained Davis and David Harris as the starting inside linebackers to begin the 2014 season, along with outside linebackers Calvin Pace and Quinton Coples. On September 14, 2014, Davis recorded six combined tackles and sacked quarterback Aaron Rodgers twice in the Jets' 31–24 loss at the Green Bay Packers in Week 2. In Week 10, he collected a season-high 12 combined tackles (11 solo) and broke up a pass during a 20–13 victory against the Pittsburgh Steelers. It was his fourth game with over ten combined tackles in 2014. He finished his third season with 116 combined tackles (79 solo), five pass deflections, and 3.5 sacks in 16 games and 16 starts. On December 30, 2014, New York Jets' owner Woody Johnson fired general manager John Idzik Jr. and head coach Rex Ryan after the Jets finished with a 4–12 record in 2014.

==== 2015 ====
Head coach Todd Bowles chose to retain the Jets' starting linebackers and officially named Davis, Harris, Coples, and Pace the starters to begin the regular season. In Week 3, he collected a season-high 13 combined tackles (six solo) in the Jets' 24–17 loss to the Philadelphia Eagles. The following week, Davis made a season-high two pass deflections and a tackle during a 27–14 win at the Dolphins in Week 4. Davis finished the 2015 season with 90 combined tackles (57 solo), two pass deflections, and two sacks in 16 games and 16 starts. Although the Jets finished second in the AFC East with a 10–6 record they did not qualify for the playoffs. He earned the 15th highest overall grade among 60 qualifying inside linebackers by Pro Football Focus.

=== Cleveland Browns ===
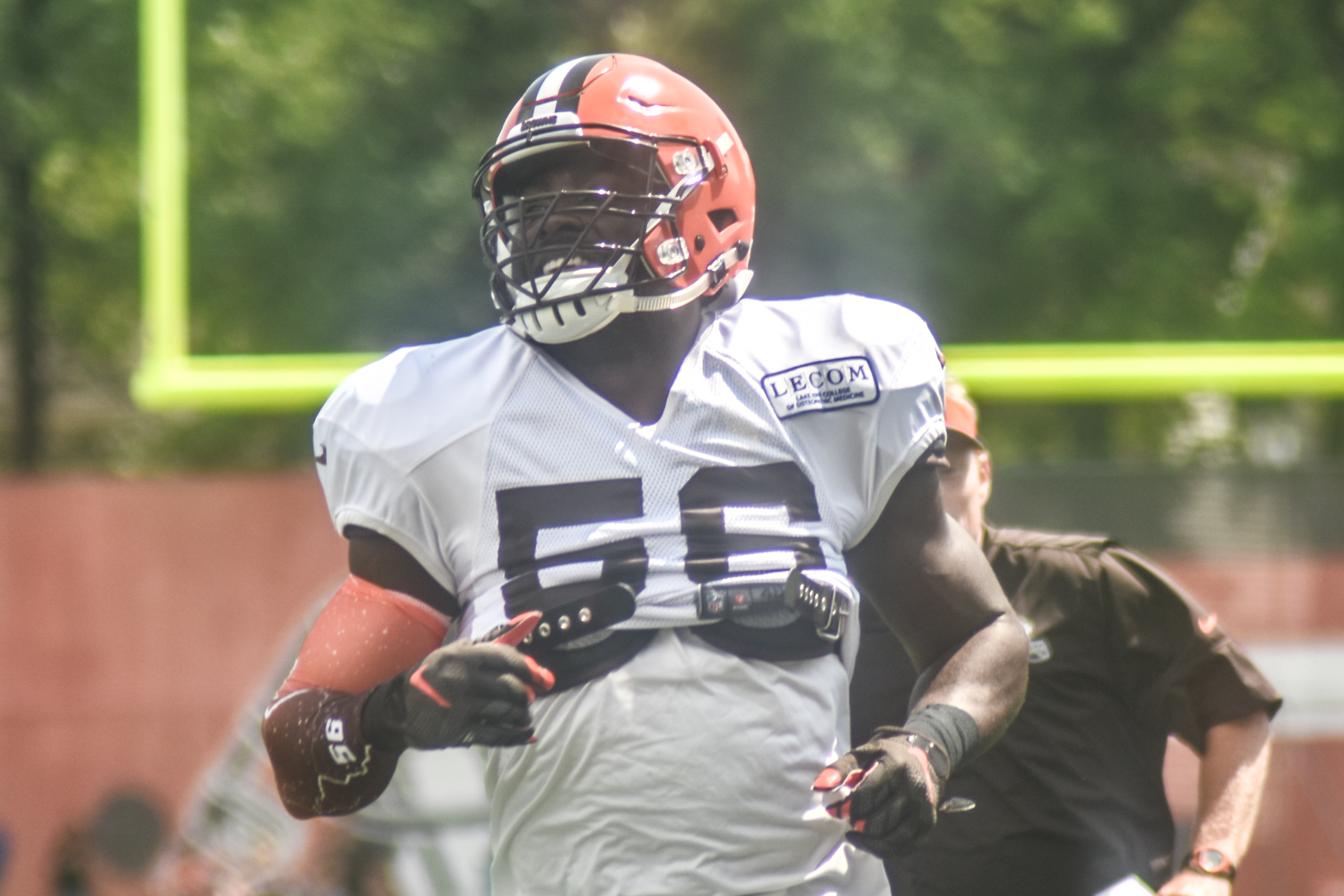
Davis with the Browns in 2016

Davis became an unrestricted free agent after the 2015 season and reportedly received interest with multiple teams, including the Cleveland Browns.

On March 16, 2016, the Cleveland Browns signed Davis to a two-year, $8 million contract that includes $4.10 million guaranteed and a signing bonus of $2 million. Head coach Hue Jackson named Davis and Christian Kirksey the starting inside linebackers to begin the regular season, along with outside linebackers Nate Orchard and Emmanuel Ogbah.

He made his Cleveland Browns' regular season debut in their season-opener at the Eagles and recorded seven combined tackles in their 29–10 loss. In Week 10, Davis recorded three combined tackles and sacked quarterback Joe Flacco during a 28–7 loss at the Baltimore Ravens. On December 18, 2016, Davis collected a season-high tying ten combined tackles (eight solo) in the Browns' 33–13 loss at the Bills in Week 15. He finished his only season with the Cleveland Browns with 99 combined tackles (59 solo), two pass deflections, and two sacks in 16 games and 16 starts.

=== New York Jets (second stint) ===
On June 1, 2017, the Browns traded Davis to the Jets in exchange for Calvin Pryor. Davis became expendable after Browns' defensive coordinator Gregg Williams switched to a base 4–3 defense that required a single middle linebacker. They also acquired Jamie Collins from the New England Patriots and had Christian Kirksey and Joe Schobert develop into viable starters.

He entered training camp slated as a starting inside linebacker, but saw competition from Bruce Carter, Julian Stanford, Spencer Paysinger, Frank Beltre, and Connor Harris. Head coach Todd Bowles named Davis and Darron Lee the starting inside linebackers to begin the regular season.

He started in the Jets' season-opener at the Bills and collected a season-high 14 combined tackles (eight solo) and was credited for half a sack in their 21–12 loss. On September 24, 2017, he recorded a season-high 11 solo tackles, assisted on a tackle, and deflected a pass in the Jets' 20–6 win against the Dolphins in Week 3. In Week 14, Davis collected 13 combined tackles (ten solo) and half a sack during a 23–0 loss at the Denver Broncos. He finished the 2017 season with a career-high 135 combined tackles (97 solo), a career-high five sacks, and three pass deflections in 16 games and 16 starts. His 135 combined tackles finished sixth in the league in 2017. He earned an overall grade of 87.3 from Pro Football Focus and received the eighth highest among all qualified linebackers in 2017.

=== New Orleans Saints ===
==== 2018 ====
Davis became an unrestricted free agent in 2018 and received interest from multiple teams as he was considered to be the top linebacker available in free agency. Davis stated he intended to return to New York and considered the Jets his home. The Jets and Davis failed to reach an agreement and Davis claimed the Jets never officially made him contract offer, but it was possibly due to his asking price. On March 19, 2018, the Saints signed Davis to a three-year, $24 million contract with $16 million guaranteed and a signing bonus of $9.20 million.

In Week 4, Davis recorded 11 tackles, two for a loss, and two sacks in a 33–18 win over the New York Giants, earning him National Football Conference Defensive Player of the Week.

==== 2019 ====
In Week 10 against the Atlanta Falcons, Davis recorded a team-high 11 tackles and sacked Matt Ryan once in the 26–18 win. He earned first team All-Pro honors for the 2019 season. He was ranked 67th by his fellow players on the NFL Top 100 Players of 2020.

==== 2020 ====
On September 12, 2020, Davis signed a three-year, $27 million contract extension with the Saints.

In Week 1 against the Buccaneers, Davis recorded his first sack of the season on Tom Brady in the 34–23 win. In the Week 3 against the Packers, Davis sacked Aaron Rodgers in the 37–30 loss. In Week 10 against the San Francisco 49ers, Davis recorded a team high 12 tackles and sacked Nick Mullens once during the 27–13 win. He was ranked 64th by his fellow players on the NFL Top 100 Players of 2021.

==== 2021 ====
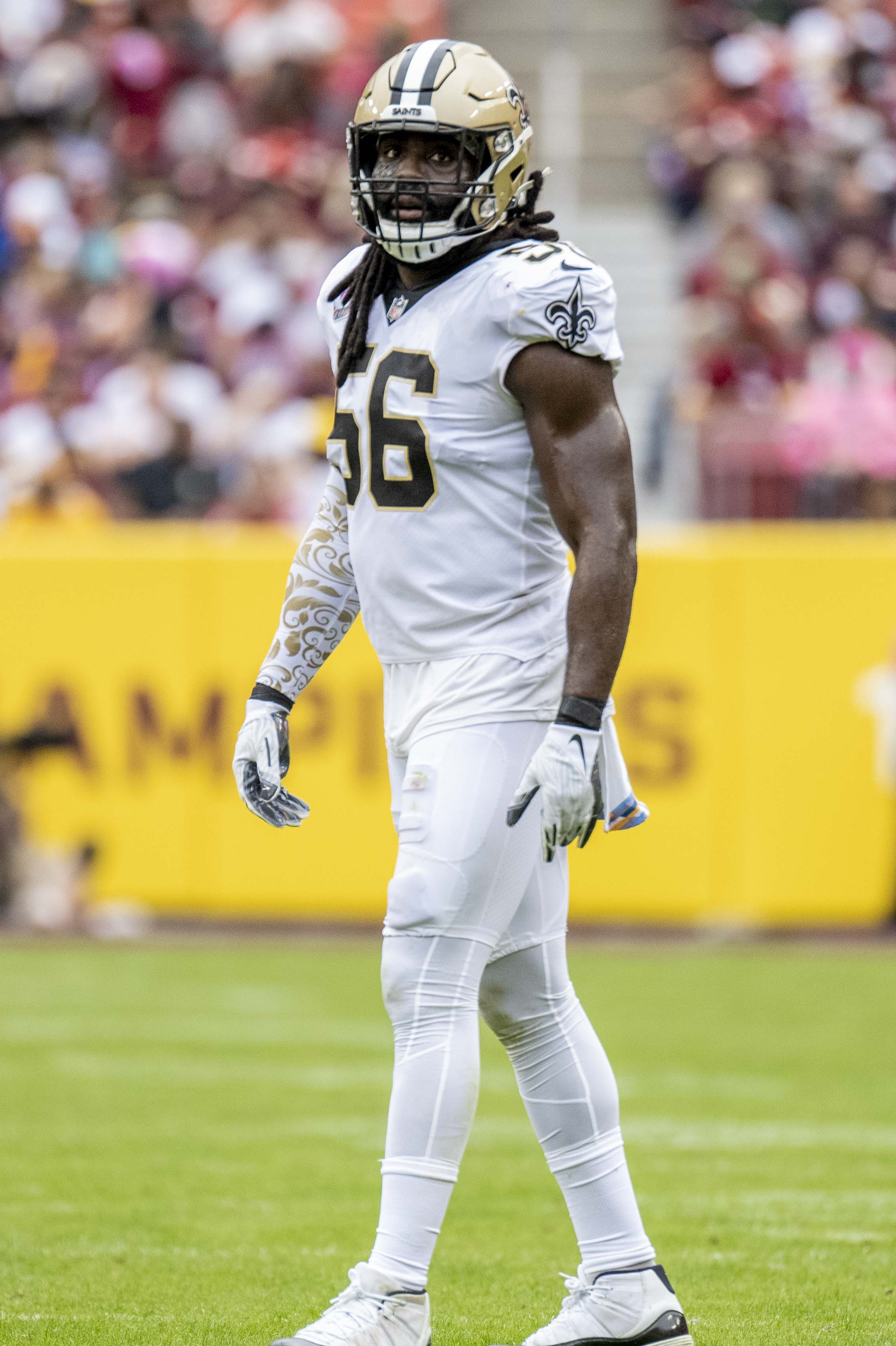
Davis with the New Orleans Saints in 2021

Davis appeared in and started 16 games for the Saints in the 2021 season. He finished with three sacks, 105 total tackles (75 solo), and seven passes defended. He was ranked 74th by his fellow players on the NFL Top 100 Players of 2022.

==== 2022 ====
On June 24, 2022, Davis signed a one-year contract extension with New Orleans. Davis played in all 17 games for the Saints, and was on the field for all 1,132 defensive snaps played by the team. In doing so, he became the only linebacker to do so in 2022, and the first to accomplish the feat since Jordan Hicks did so for the Arizona Cardinals in 2019. He was named as a Pro Bowler for the first time. He was ranked 43rd by his fellow players on the NFL Top 100 Players of 2023.

==== 2023 ====
Davis started in all 17 games for the Saints in the 2023 season. He finished with 6.5 sacks, 121 total tackles (74 solo), four passes defended, one forced fumble, and one fumble recovery. He was named as a Pro Bowler for the second consecutive season. He was ranked 44th by his fellow players on the NFL Top 100 Players of 2024.

==== 2024 ====
On March 11, 2024, the Saints agreed to terms of Davis' contract, extending him through to 2025. Davis missed the first game of his career due to injury in Week 4, with a hamstring malady causing him to be absent from a matchup against the Atlanta Falcons.

==== 2025 ====
Davis started all 17 games for New Orleans during the 2025 campaign, registering three pass deflections, two forced fumbles, one fumble recovery, 0.5 sacks, and a career-high 143 combined tackles.

=== New York Jets (third stint) ===
On March 12, 2026, the New York Jets signed Davis to a two-year, $22 million contract with $15 million guaranteed and a signing bonus of $7.5 million.

== Career statistics ==
Legend
	Led the league
**Bold**	Career high

=== NFL ===
==== Regular season ====
Year	Team	Games		Tackles				Interceptions						Fumbles			
Year	Team	GP	GS	Cmb	Solo	Ast	Sck	PD	Int	Yds	Avg	Lng	TD	FF	FR	Yds	TD
2012	NYJ	16	3	36	31	5	0.0	0	0	0	0.0	0	0	0	1	−4	0
2013	NYJ	16	16	106	63	43	1.0	1	**1**	0	0.0	0	0	0	0	0	0
2014	NYJ	16	16	116	79	37	3.5	5	0	0	0.0	0	0	0	**2**	0	0
2015	NYJ	16	16	90	57	33	2.0	2	0	0	0.0	0	0	0	1	0	0
2016	CLE	16	15	99	59	40	2.0	2	0	0	0.0	0	0	1	0	0	0
2017	NYJ	16	16	135	**97**	38	5.0	3	0	0	0.0	0	0	0	1	12	0
2018	NO	16	16	110	74	36	5.0	4	0	0	0.0	0	0	**2**	1	0	0
2019	NO	16	16	111	87	24	4.0	**12**	**1**	1	1.0	1	0	0	0	0	0
2020	NO	16	16	119	73	46	4.0	5	0	0	0.0	0	0	0	0	0	0
2021	NO	16	16	105	70	35	3.0	7	0	0	0.0	0	0	0	0	0	0
2022	NO	17	17	107	54	55	**6.5**	6	**1**	**4**	**4.0**	**4**	0	0	1	0	0
2023	NO	17	17	121	74	47	**6.5**	4	0	0	0.0	0	0	1	1	**20**	0
2024	NO	16	16	136	69	67	2.0	7	1	0	0.0	0	0	0	0	0	0
2025	NO	17	17	**143**	64	**79**	0.5	3	0	0	0.0	0	0	**2**	1	0	0
2026	NYJ	10	10	68	37	31	2.0	4	0	0	0.0	0	0	0	1	0	0
Career		237	223	1,607	988	616	47.0	65	4	5	1.3	4	0	6	10	28	0

==== Postseason ====
Year	Team	Games		Tackles				Interceptions						Fumbles			
Year	Team	GP	GS	Cmb	Solo	Ast	Sck	PD	Int	Yds	Avg	Lng	TD	FF	FR	Yds	TD
2018	NO	2	2	**22**	**14**	**8**	0.0	1	**1**	**1**	**1.0**	**1**	0	0	0	0	0
2019	NO	1	1	7	4	3	0.0	**2**	0	0	0.0	0	0	0	0	0	0
2020	NO	2	2	14	12	2	**1.0**	0	0	0	0.0	0	0	0	0	0	0
Career		5	5	43	30	13	1.0	3	1	1	1.0	1	0	0	0	0	0

=== College ===
Year	Team	GP	Tackles					Interceptions					Fumbles			
Year	Team	GP	Cmb	Solo	Ast	Sck	TFL	Int	Yds	Avg	TD	PD	FF	FR	Yds	TD
2007	Arkansas State	0	Redshirt													
2008	Arkansas State	11	17	10	7	0.0	1.0	0	0	—	0	**1**	0	**1**	**53**	**1**
2009	Arkansas State	12	**80**	**51**	29	**3.0**	8.0	1	**75**	**75.0**	**1**	0	**3**	0	0	0
2010	Arkansas State	12	63	37	26	1.0	3.5	**2**	10	5.0	0	0	2	0	0	0
2011	Arkansas State	13	69	31	**38**	**3.0**	**10.0**	1	27	27.0	0	0	0	0	0	0
Career		48	229	129	100	7.0	22.5	4	112	28.0	1	1	5	1	53	1

== Awards and honors ==
NFL

- First-team All-Pro (2019)
- 4× Second-team All-Pro (2020–2023)
- 2× Pro Bowl (2022, 2023)
- Pro Bowl Defensive MVP (2023)
- NFL solo tackles co-leader (2017)
- Bart Starr Award (2021)
- 6× NFL Top 100 — 67th (2020), 64th (2021), 74th (2022), 43rd (2023), 44th (2024), 95th (2026)
- NFC Defensive Player of the Week (Week 4, 2018)

College

- 2× First-team All-Sun Belt (2010, 2011)

== Personal life ==
Davis is a devout Christian. His cousin was former NFL quarterback Steve McNair. Davis married in 2012 and has five children, 4 girls and one boy, with his wife Tamela. During the 2019 season, Davis was fined $7,000 by the NFL for wearing a headband in Week 3 with the words "Man of God" on it, though the fine was later repealed.

Davis's devotion to community service has earned him recognition as the New Orleans Saints’ nominee for the Walter Payton NFL Man of the Year Award in 2020, 2022, and 2025. Along with his wife Tamela, he founded the Devoted Dreamers Foundation and launched the Devoted Dreamers Academy, a youth leadership and development program designed to equip students with tools for success through education, mentorship, character building, and life skills. Additionally, Davis has worked with the 18th Ward to launch a leadership development program to work in teams to fix real world problems in the New Orleans area.
