= Steve Roberts (American football) =

American football coach

Biographical details
- Born: October 13, 1964 (age 62)
- Education: Ouachita Baptist

Coaching career (HC unless noted)
- 1987: Southern Arkansas (assistant)
- 1988–1989: Texas HS (TX) (assistant)
- 1990–1993: Southern Arkansas (assistant)
- 1994–1999: Southern Arkansas
- 2000–2001: Northwestern State
- 2002–2010: Arkansas State

Administrative career (AD unless noted)
- 2011–2016: Cabot Public Schools (AR)
- 2016–present: Arkansas Activities Association (Associate Executive Director)

Head coaching record
- Overall: 92–98–1
- Bowls: 0–1
- Tournaments: 0–1 (NCAA D-II playoffs); 0–1 (NCAA D-I-AA playoffs)

Accomplishments and honors

Championships
- 1 GSC (1997); 1 Sun Belt (2005)

Awards
- Sun Belt Coach of the Year (2005); Gulf South Coach of The Year (1997)

Steve Roberts (born October 13, 1964) is an American former football coach. He served as the head football coach at Southern Arkansas University from 1994 to 1999, at Northwestern State University from 2000 to 2001, and at Arkansas State University from 2002 to 2010, compiling a career college football record of 92–98–1. After leaving Arkansas State, he became the athletic director for the Cabot, Arkansas School District in July 2011. He served there until 2016 when he became Associate Executive Director for Football at the Arkansas Activities Association.

== Head coaching record ==
Year	Team	Overall	Conference	Standing	Bowl/playoffs
Southern Arkansas Muleriders (Arkansas Intercollegiate Conference) (1994)
1994	Southern Arkansas	1–7–1	0–4	5th	
Southern Arkansas Muleriders (Gulf South Conference) (1995–1999)
1995	Southern Arkansas	4–6	1–6	10th	
1996	Southern Arkansas	4–6	2–5	9th	
1997	Southern Arkansas	9–2	6–1	T–1st	L NCAA Division II First Round
1998	Southern Arkansas	8–2	7–2	T–3rd	
1999	Southern Arkansas	9–1	7–2	T–2nd	
Southern Arkansas:		35–24–1	23–20		
Northwestern State Demons (Southland Conference) (2000–2001)
2000	Northwestern State	4–7	1–6	T–7th	
2001	Northwestern State	8–4	4–2	T–3rd	L NCAA Division I-AA First Round
Northwestern State:		12–11	5–8		
Arkansas State Indians / Red Wolves (Sun Belt Conference) (2002–2010)
2002	Arkansas State	6–7	3–3	3rd	
2003	Arkansas State	5–7	3–3	T–3rd	
2004	Arkansas State	3–8	3–4	6th	
2005	Arkansas State	6–6	5–2	1st	L New Orleans
2006	Arkansas State	6–6	4–3	T–3rd	
2007	Arkansas State	5–7	3–4	T–5th	
2008	Arkansas State	6–6	4–3	T–3rd	
2009	Arkansas State	4–8	3–5	T–6th	
2010	Arkansas State	4–8	4–4	T–4th	
Arkansas State:		45–63	32–31		
Total:		92–98–1			
National championship Conference title Conference division title or championship game berth
