= 2020 Arkansas State Red Wolves football team =

American college football season

2020 Arkansas State Red Wolves football
- Conference: Sun Belt Conference
- West Division
- Record: 4–7 (2–6 Sun Belt)
- Head coach: Blake Anderson (7th season)
- Offensive coordinator: Keith Heckendorf (2nd season)
- Offensive scheme: Spread
- Defensive coordinator: David Duggan (2nd season; games 1–5); Nick Paremski (interim; games 6–11)
- Base defense: 4–3
- Home stadium: Centennial Bank Stadium

2020 Sun Belt Conference football standings
| | Conf. | | | Overall |
| Team | W | | L | W | | L |
|---|---|---|---|---|---|---|
East Division
| No. 14 Coastal Carolina xy+ | 8 | – | 0 | 11 | – | 1 |
| Appalachian State | 6 | – | 2 | 9 | – | 3 |
| Georgia Southern | 4 | – | 4 | 8 | – | 5 |
| Georgia State | 4 | – | 4 | 6 | – | 4 |
| Troy | 3 | – | 4 | 5 | – | 6 |
West Division
| No. 15 Louisiana xy+ | 7 | – | 1 | 10 | – | 1 |
| South Alabama | 3 | – | 5 | 4 | – | 7 |
| Arkansas State | 2 | – | 6 | 4 | – | 7 |
| Texas State | 2 | – | 6 | 2 | – | 10 |
| Louisiana–Monroe | 0 | – | 7 | 0 | – | 10 |
Championship: Louisiana at Coastal Carolina (Canceled)
+ – Conference co-champions; x – Division champion/co-champions; y – Championship game participant; Rankings from AP Poll

The 2020 Arkansas State Red Wolves football team represented Arkansas State University in the 2020 NCAA Division I FBS football season. The Red Wolves played their home games at Centennial Bank Stadium in Jonesboro, Arkansas, and competed in the West Division of the Sun Belt Conference. They were led by Blake Anderson, in his seventh season as head coach. Butch Jones was hired to replace Anderson, after the team played to a 4–7 record (2–6 in conference play).

== Schedule ==
Arkansas State had games scheduled against Howard and Michigan, which were canceled due to the COVID-19 pandemic.

| Date | Time | Opponent | Site | TV | Result | Attendance |
|---|---|---|---|---|---|---|
| September 5 | 7:00 p.m. | at Memphis* | Liberty Bowl Memorial Stadium; Memphis, TN (Paint Bucket Bowl) | ESPN | L 24–37 | 4,537 |
| September 12 | 11:00 a.m. | at Kansas State* | Bill Snyder Family Football Stadium; Manhattan, KS | FOX | W 35–31 | 11,041 |
| October 3 | 11:00 a.m. | at Coastal Carolina | Brooks Stadium; Conway, SC | ESPN2 | L 23–52 | 5,000 |
| October 10 | 2:30 p.m. | Central Arkansas* | Centennial Bank Stadium; Jonesboro, AR | ESPN3 | W 50–27 | 4,561 |
| October 15 | 6:30 p.m. | Georgia State | Centennial Bank Stadium; Jonesboro, AR | ESPN | W 59–52 | 5,496 |
| October 22 | 6:30 p.m. | at Appalachian State | Kidd Brewer Stadium; Boone, NC | ESPN | L 17–45 | 2,100 |
| October 31 | 2:00 p.m. | Troy | Centennial Bank Stadium; Jonesboro, AR | ESPN3 | L 10–38 | 6,757 |
| November 7 | 11:00 a.m. | at Louisiana | Cajun Field; Lafayette, LA | ESPNU | L 20–27 | 5,585 |
| November 21 | 2:00 p.m. | at Texas State | Bobcat Stadium; San Marcos, TX | ESPN2 | L 45–47 | 5,218 |
| November 28 | 2:00 p.m. | South Alabama | Centennial Bank Stadium; Jonesboro, AR | ESPN3 | L 31–38 | 4,013 |
| December 5 | 2:00 p.m. | Louisiana–Monroe | Centennial Bank Stadium; Jonesboro, AR | ESPN3 | W 48–15 | 3,268 |
*Non-conference game; Rankings from AP Poll and CFP Rankings after November 24 released prior to game; All times are in Central time

Schedule source:

== Game summaries ==
=== At Memphis ===
Arkansas State at Memphis

| Team | 1 | 2 | 3 | 4 | Total |
|---|---|---|---|---|---|
| Red Wolves | 14 | 0 | 3 | 7 | 24 |
| • Tigers | 7 | 14 | 13 | 3 | 37 |

- Date: September 5, 2020
- Location: Liberty Bowl Memorial Stadium
  Memphis, TN
- Game start: 7:00 p.m. CDT
- Elapsed time: 3 hours and 44 minutes
- Game attendance: 4,537
- Game weather: Clear • Temperature: 79 °F (26 °C) • Wind: N 3 mph
- Referee: Kyle Olsen
- TV announcers (ESPN): Bob Wischusen (play-by-play), Dan Orlovsky (analyst), Cole Cubelic (sideline)

Scoring summary
| 1 | 10:36 | ARST | Ryan Graham 1 yard rush (Blake Grupe kick) (12 plays, 75 yards, 4:24) | ARST 7–0 |
| 1 | 5:53 | MEM | Sean Dykes 12 yard pass from Brady White (Riley Patterson kick) (12 plays, 85 yards, 4:43) | Tied 7–7 |
| 1 | 0:18 | ARST | Isaiah Azubuike 1 yard rush (Blake Grupe kick) (8 plays, 84 yards, 2:16) | ARST 14–7 |
| 2 | 12:49 | MEM | Rodrigues Clark 14 yard rush (Riley Patterson kick) (8 plays, 72 yards, 3:16) | TIE 14–14 |
| 2 | 0:24 | MEM | Calvin Austin III 9 yard pass from Brady White (Riley Patterson kick) (9 plays, 80 yards, 3:16) | MEM 21–14 |
| 3 | 11:05 | ARST | Blake Grupe 28 yard field goal (7 plays, 17 yards, 2:34) | MEM 21–17 |
| 3 | 8:03 | MEM | Damonte Coxie 8 yard pass from Brady White (Riley Patterson kick failed) (7 plays, 50 yards, 3:02) | MEM 27–17 |
| 3 | 3:33 | MEM | Sean Dykes 7 yard pass from Brady White (Riley Patterson kick) (6 plays, 47 yards, 2:59) | MEM 34–17 |
| 4 | 11:43 | MEM | Riley Patterson 26 yard field goal (14 plays, 76 yards, 5:57) | MEM 37–17 |
| 4 | 7:42 | ARST | TW Ayers 1 yard pass from Logan Bonner (Blake Grupe kick) (12 plays, 84 yards, 4:01) | MEM 37–24 |

| Statistics | Arkansas State | Memphis |
|---|---|---|
| First downs | 25 | 29 |
| Total yards | 424 | 502 |
| Rushing yards | 125 | 222 |
| Passing yards | 299 | 280 |
| Turnovers | 3 | 1 |
| Time of possession | 25:40 | 34:20 |

| Team | Category | Player | Statistics |
|---|---|---|---|
| Arkansas State | Passing | Layne Hatcher | 13/20, 166 yards |
| Arkansas State | Rushing | Jamal Jones | 15 carries, 64 yards |
| Arkansas State | Receiving | Dahu Green | 5 receptions, 99 yards |
| Memphis | Passing | Brady White | 27/37, 280 yards, 4 TDs, 1 INT |
| Memphis | Rushing | Rodriguez Clark | 20 carries, 105 yards, 1 TD |
| Memphis | Receiving | Sean Dykes | 10 receptions, 137 yards, 2 TDs |

=== At Kansas State ===
Arkansas State at Kansas State

| Team | 1 | 2 | 3 | 4 | Total |
|---|---|---|---|---|---|
| • Red Wolves | 7 | 7 | 7 | 14 | 35 |
| Wildcats | 7 | 14 | 0 | 10 | 31 |

- Date: September 12, 2020
- Location: Bill Snyder Family Football Stadium
  Manhattan, KS
- Game start: 11:00 a.m. CDT
- Elapsed time: 3 hours 43 minutes
- Game attendance: 11,041
- Game weather: 67 °F (19 °C) • Weather: Mostly Cloudy • Wind: SW 11 MPH
- Referee: Scott Campbell
- TV announcers (Fox): Gus Johnson (play-by-play), Joel Klatt (analyst) and Jenny Taft (sideline)

Scoring summary
| 1 | 13:24 | KSU | Phillip Brooks 17-yard pass from Skylar Thompson (Blake Lynch kick) (2 plays, 19 yards, 0:51) | KSU 7–0 |
| 1 | 09:58 | ARST | Jonathan Adams Jr. 2-yard pass from Logan Bonner (Blake Grupe kick) (9 plays, 75 yards, 3:26) | TIE 7–7 |
| 2 | 13:29 | KSU | Deuce Vaughn 3-yard rush (Blake Lynch kick) (7 plays, 49 yards, 3:47) | KSU 14–7 |
| 2 | 08:41 | KSU | Briley Moore 7-yard pass from Skylar Thompson (Blake Lynch kick) (7 plays, 92 yards, 4:01) | KSU 21–7 |
| 2 | 06:50 | ARST | Roshauud Paul 48-yard pass from Jeff Foreman (Blake Grupe kick) (5 plays, 75 yards, 1:51) | KSU 21–14 |
| 3 | 02:28 | ARST | Giles Amos 8-yard pass from Layne Hatcher (Blake Grupe kick) (5 plays, 77 yards, 1:46) | TIE 21–21 |
| 4 | 11:49 | ARST | Jonathan Adams Jr. 5-yard pass from Logan Bonner (Blake Grupe kick) (10 plays, 71 yards, 3:00) | ARST 28–21 |
| 4 | 06:35 | KSU | Harry Trotter 5-yard rush (Blake Lynch kick) (10 plays, 55 yards, 5:07) | TIE 28–28 |
| 4 | 02:30 | KSU | Blake Lynch 35-yard field goal (7 plays, 47 yards, 3:14) | KSU 31–28 |
| 4 | 00:38 | ARST | Jonathan Adams Jr. 17-yard pass from Layne Hatcher (Blake Grupe kick) (7 plays, 65 yards, 1:46) | ARST 35–31 |

| Statistics | Arkansas State | Kansas State |
|---|---|---|
| First downs | 26 | 21 |
| Total yards | 489 | 374 |
| Rushing yards | 159 | 91 |
| Passing yards | 330 | 289 |
| Turnovers | 2 | 0 |
| Time of possession | 25:44 | 34:16 |

| Team | Category | Player | Statistics |
|---|---|---|---|
| Arkansas State | Passing | Logan Bonner | 17/28, 204 yards, 2 TDs, 1 INT |
| Arkansas State | Rushing | Jamal Jones | 16 carries, 95 yards |
| Arkansas State | Receiving | Jonathan Adams Jr. | 8 receptions, 98 yards, 3 TDs |
| Kansas State | Passing | Skylar Thompson | 17/29, 259 yards, 2 TDs |
| Kansas State | Rushing | Deuce Vaughn | 12 carries, 47 yards, 1 TD |
| Kansas State | Receiving | Chabastin Taylor | 4 receptions, 98 yards |

=== At Coastal Carolina ===
Arkansas State at Coastal Carolina

| Team | 1 | 2 | 3 | 4 | Total |
|---|---|---|---|---|---|
| Red Wolves | 14 | 0 | 0 | 9 | 23 |
| • Chanticleers | 7 | 17 | 7 | 21 | 52 |

- Date: October 3, 2020
- Location: Brooks Stadium
  Conway, SC
- Game start: 11:01 a.m. CDT
- Elapsed time: 3 hours and 35 minutes
- Game attendance: 5,000
- Game weather: • Weather: TBD • Wind: TBD MPH
- Referee: Wayne Winkler
- TV announcers (ESPN2): Beth Mowins (play–by–play), Kirk Morrison (analyst), and Taylor Davis (sideline reporter)

Scoring summary
| 1 | 05:38 | ARST | Dahu Green 33-yard pass from Logan Bonner (Blake Grupe kick) (5 plays, 82 yards, 1:28) | ARST 7–0 |
| 1 | 05:26 | CCU | Isaiah Likely 72-yard pass from Grayson McCall (Massimo Biscardi kick) (1 play, 72 yards, 0:12) | TIE 7–7 |
| 1 | 02:30 | ARST | Brandon Bowling 21-yard pass from Logan Bonner (Blake Grupe kick) (3 plays, 27 yards, 0:52) | ARST 14–7 |
| 2 | 12:04 | CCU | CJ Marable 12-yard rush (Massimo Biscardi kick) (10 plays, 75 yards, 5:26) | TIE 14–14 |
| 2 | 10:28 | CCU | Massimo Biscardi 42-yard field goal (4 plays, 6 yards, 1:35) | CCU 17–14 |
| 2 | 00:58 | CCU | CJ Marable 3-yard pass from Grayson McCall (Massimo Biscardi kick) (18 plays, 94 yards, 8:38) | CCU 24–14 |
| 3 | 06:57 | CCU | Kameron Brown 3-yard pass from Grayson McCall (Massimo Biscardi kick) (14 plays, 83 yards, 7:57) | CCU 31–14 |
| 4 | 14:05 | ARST | Blake Grupe 42-yard field goal (8 plays, 45 yards, 2:32) | CCU 31–17 |
| 4 | 10:29 | CCU | Jaivon Heiligh 6-yard pass from Grayson McCall (Massimo Biscardi kick) (8 plays, 69 yards, 3:30) | CCU 38–17 |
| 4 | 06:16 | CCU | Shermari Jones 15-yard rush (Massimo Biscardi kick) (5 plays, 52 yards, 2:20) | CCU 45–17 |
| 4 | 05:07 | ARST | Brandon Bowling 44-yard pass from Layne Hatcher (Blake Grupe PAT blocked) (5 plays, 73 yards, 1:04) | CCU 45–23 |
| 4 | 04:12 | CCU | Braydon Bennett 35-yard rush (Massimo Biscardi kick) (2 plays, 44 yards, 0:54) | CCU 52–23 |

| Statistics | Arkansas State | Coastal Carolina |
|---|---|---|
| First downs | 15 | 25 |
| Total yards | 385 | 539 |
| Rushing yards | 36 | 217 |
| Passing yards | 349 | 322 |
| Turnovers | 2 | 3 |
| Time of possession | 18:39 | 41:21 |

| Team | Category | Player | Statistics |
|---|---|---|---|
| Arkansas State | Passing | Layne Hatcher | 12/23, 184 yards, 1 TD, 1 INT |
| Arkansas State | Rushing | Lincoln Pare | 6 carries, 18 yards |
| Arkansas State | Receiving | Brandon Bowling | 7 receptions, 115 yards, 2 TDs |
| Coastal Carolina | Passing | Grayson McCall | 20/29, 322 yards, 4 TDs, 1 INT |
| Coastal Carolina | Rushing | C.J. Marable | 15 carries, 63 yards, 1 TD |
| Coastal Carolina | Receiving | Jaivon Heiligh | 7 receptions, 93 yards, 1 TD |

=== Central Arkansas ===
Central Arkansas at Arkansas State

| Team | 1 | 2 | 3 | 4 | Total |
|---|---|---|---|---|---|
| Bears | 3 | 10 | 0 | 14 | 27 |
| • Red Wolves | 2 | 21 | 20 | 7 | 50 |

- Date: October 10, 2020
- Location: Centennial Bank Stadium
  Jonesboro, AR
- Game start: 2:35 p.m. CDT
- Elapsed time: 3 hours and 45 minutes
- Game attendance: 4,561
- Game weather: 68 °F (20 °C) • Weather: Cloudy, Rainy • Wind: NE 13 MPH
- Referee: T. Livingston
- TV announcers (ESPN3): Roger Twibell (play–by–play), Pete Cordelli (analyst), and Cori Keller (sideline reporter)

Scoring summary
| 1 | 08:07 | UCA | Hayden Ray 36-yard field goal (4 plays, 4 yards, 3:47) | UCA 3–0 |
| 1 | 06:04 | ARST | Team Safety (3 plays, −2 yards, 0:22) | UCA 3–2 |
| 2 | 10:44 | UCA | Hayden Ray 42-yard field goal (4 plays, 4 yards, 1:28) | UCA 6–2 |
| 2 | 05:22 | ARST | Jonathan Adams Jr. 4-yard pass from Layne Hatcher (Blake Grupe kick) (13 plays, 75 yards, 5:21) | ARST 9–6 |
| 2 | 03:14 | ARST | Samy Johnson 60-yard interception returned (Blake Grupe kick) (7 plays, 34 yards, 2:08) | ARST 16–6 |
| 2 | 01:31 | UCA | Lujuan Winningham 23-yard pass from Breylin Smith (Hayden Ray kick) (1 play, 23 yards, 0:06) | ARST 16–13 |
| 2 | 00:29 | ARST | Brandon Bowling 15-yard pass from Layne Hatcher (Blake Grupe kick) (8 plays, 73 yards, 0:58) | ARST 23–13 |
| 3 | 13:40 | ARST | Dahu Green 3-yard pass from Logan Bonner (Blake Grupe kick) (5 plays, 75 yards, 1:20) | ARST 30–13 |
| 3 | 08:19 | ARST | Jonathan Adams Jr. 22-yard pass from Layne Hatcher (Blake Grupe kick) (6 plays, 87 yards, 2:49) | ARST 37–13 |
| 3 | 00:29 | ARST | Dahu Green 20-yard pass from Logan Bonner (Blake Grupe PAT failed) (6 plays, 94 yards, 2:48) | ARST 43–13 |
| 4 | 13:32 | UCA | Lujuan Winningham 2-yard pass from Breylin Smith (Hayden Ray kick) (5 plays, 63 yards, 1:50) | ARST 43–20 |
| 4 | 11:32 | UCA | Lujuan Winningham 31-yard pass from Marshun Douglas (Hayden Ray kick) (4 plays, 53 yards, 1:57) | ARST 43–27 |
| 4 | 05:14 | ARST | Corey Rucker 56-yard pass from Logan Bonner (Blake Grupe kick) (6 plays, 76 yards, 1:50) | ARST 50–27 |

| Statistics | Central Arkansas | Arkansas State |
|---|---|---|
| First downs | 22 | 25 |
| Total yards | 411 | 573 |
| Rushing yards | 78 | 181 |
| Passing yards | 333 | 392 |
| Turnovers | 3 | 1 |
| Time of possession | 33:05 | 26:55 |

| Team | Category | Player | Statistics |
|---|---|---|---|
| Central Arkansas | Passing | Breylin Smith | 24/49, 302 yards, 2 TDs, 2 INTs |
| Central Arkansas | Rushing | Kierre Crossley | 17 carries, 83 yards |
| Central Arkansas | Receiving | Tyler Hudson | 12 receptions, 154 yards |
| Arkansas State | Passing | Logan Bonner | 11/19, 239 yards, 3 TDs |
| Arkansas State | Rushing | Marcel Murray | 6 carries, 52 yards |
| Arkansas State | Receiving | Jonathan Adams Jr. | 6 receptions, 101 yards, 2 TDs |

=== Georgia State ===
Georgia State at Arkansas State

| Team | 1 | 2 | 3 | 4 | Total |
|---|---|---|---|---|---|
| Panthers | 7 | 21 | 14 | 10 | 52 |
| • Red Wolves | 14 | 14 | 17 | 14 | 59 |

- Date: October 15, 2020
- Location: Centennial Bank Stadium
  Jonesboro, AR
- Game start: 6:31 p.m. CDT
- Elapsed time: 4 hours and 21 minutes
- Game attendance: 5,496
- Game weather: 60 °F (16 °C) • Weather: Mostly Cloudy • Wind: NNE 8 MPH
- Referee: Kyle Olson
- TV announcers (ESPN): Matt Barrie (play–by–play), Mike Golic Jr. (analyst), and Tera Talmadge (sideline reporter)

Scoring summary
| 1 | 12:58 | ARST | Reed Tyler 3-yard pass from Logan Bonner (Blake Grupe kick) (3 plays, 5 yards, 0:50) | ARST 7–0 |
| 1 | 04:34 | GSU | Cornelious Brown IV 35-yard rush (Noel Ruiz kick) (5 plays, 99 yards, 1:48) | TIE 7–7 |
| 1 | 03:20 | ARST | Dahu Green 49-yard pass from Layne Hatcher (Blake Grupe kick) (3 plays, 66 yards, 1:14) | ARST 14–7 |
| 2 | 12:11 | GSU | Blake Carroll 74-yard fumble returned (Noel Ruiz kick) (11 plays, 54 yards, 4:38) | TIE 14–14 |
| 2 | 06:00 | ARST | Jonathan Adams Jr. 42-yard pass from Logan Bonner (Blake Grupe kick) (7 plays, 81 yards, 2:03) | ARST 21–14 |
| 2 | 04:29 | GSU | Cornelious Brown IV 11-yard rush (Noel Ruiz kick) (4 plays, 75 yards, 1:31) | TIE 21–21 |
| 2 | 00:48 | ARST | Dahu Green 20-yard pass from Layne Hatcher (Blake Grupe kick); 11 plays, 75 yards, 3:41) | ARST 28–21 |
| 2 | 00:14 | GSU | Sam Pinckney 21-yard pass from Cornelious Brown IV (Noel Ruiz kick) (5 plays, 75 yards, 0:34) | TIE 28–28 |
| 3 | 13:30 | GSU | Sam Pinckney 36-yard pass from Cornelious Brown IV (Noel Ruiz kick) (2 plays, 39 yards, 0:30) | ARST 35–28 |
| 3 | -08:21 | ARST | Brandon Bowling 16-yard pass from Logan Bonner (Blake Grupe kick) (11 plays, 75 yards, 5:09) | TIE 35–35 |
| 3 | 06:21 | ARST | Lincoln Pare 8-yard pass from Layne Hatcher (Blake Grupe kick) (3 plays, 53 yards, 0:46) | ARST 42–35 |
| 3 | 04:44 | GSU | Tucker Gregg 7-yard rush (Noel Ruiz kick) (6 plays, 75 yards, 1:37) | TIE 42–42 |
| 3 | 02:36 | ARST | Blake Grupe 39-yard field goal (8 plays, 51 yards, 2:08) | ARST 45–42 |
| 4 | 14:54 | GSU | Sam Pinckney 31-yard pass from Cornelious Brown IV (Noel Ruiz kick) (10 plays, 75 yards, 2:42) | GSU 49–45 |
| 4 | 12:40 | ARST | Jonathan Adams Jr. 32-yard pass from Layne Hatcher (Blake Grupe kick) (8 plays, 85 yards, 2:14) | ARST 52–49 |
| 4 | 06:55 | GSU | Noel Ruiz 29-yard field goal (9 plays, 60 yards, 3:29) | TIE 52–52 |
| 4 | 04:23 | ARST | Lincoln Pare 22-yard pass from Roshauud Paul (Blake Grupe kick) (6 plays, 75 yards, 2:32) | ARST 59–52 |

| Statistics | Georgia State | Arkansas State |
|---|---|---|
| First downs | 25 | 34 |
| Total yards | 583 | 609 |
| Rushing yards | 269 | 58 |
| Passing yards | 314 | 551 |
| Turnovers | 1 | 1 |
| Time of possession | 24:19 | 35:41 |

| Team | Category | Player | Statistics |
|---|---|---|---|
| Georgia State | Passing | Cornelious Brown IV | 18/35, 314 yards, 3 TDs |
| Georgia State | Rushing | Tucker Gregg | 14 carries, 142 yards, 1 TD |
| Georgia State | Receiving | Sam Pinckney | 6 receptions, 146 yards, 3 TDs |
| Arkansas State | Passing | Layne Hatcher | 21/28, 332 yards, 4 TDs |
| Arkansas State | Rushing | Jamal Jones | 13 carries, 41 yards |
| Arkansas State | Receiving | Jonathan Adams Jr. | 15 receptions, 177 yards, 2 TDs |

=== At Appalachian State ===
Arkansas State at Appalachian State

| Team | 1 | 2 | 3 | 4 | Total |
|---|---|---|---|---|---|
| Red Wolves | 7 | 0 | 10 | 0 | 17 |
| • Mountaineers | 14 | 17 | 7 | 7 | 45 |

- Date: October 22, 2020
- Location: Kidd Brewer Stadium
  Boone, NC
- Game start: 6:30 p.m. CDT
- Elapsed time: 3 hours and 26 minutes
- Game attendance: 2,100
- Game weather: 64 °F (18 °C) • Weather: Clear • Wind: Light
- Referee: Jeremy Parker
- TV announcers (ESPN): Matt Barrie (play–by–play), Mike Golic Jr. (analyst), and Marty Smith (sideline reporter)

Scoring summary
| 1 | 09:31 | APST | Christian Wells 46-yard pass from Zac Thomas (Chandler Staton kick) (6 plays, 85 yards, 3:06) | APST 7–0 |
| 1 | 06:26 | ARST | Jamal Jones 8-yard rush (Blake Grupe kick) (8 plays, 77 yards, 3:05) | TIE 7–7 |
| 1 | 05:05 | APST | Daetrich Harrington 55-yard rush (Chandler Staton kick) (3 plays, 75 yards, 1:21) | APST 14–7 |
| 2 | 10:58 | APST | Mike Evans 5-yard pass from Zac Thomas (Chandler Staton kick) (17 plays, 88 yards, 6:27) | APST 21–7 |
| 2 | 04:39 | APST | Chandler Staton 39-yard field goal (4 plays, −1 yards, 0:44) | APST 24–7 |
| 2 | 01:04 | APST | Malik Williams 16-yard pass from Zac Thomas (Chandler Staton kick) (7 plays, 63 yards, 1:59) | APST 31–7 |
| 3 | 09:36 | ARST | Blake Grupe 34-yard field goal (13 plays, 57 yards, 4:34) | APST 31–10 |
| 3 | 02:08 | ARST | Lincoln Pare 48-yard rush (Blake Grupe kick) (3 plays, 65 yards, 0:39) | APST 31–17 |
| 3 | 00:15 | APST | Zac Thomas 60-yard rush (Chandler Staton kick) (4 plays, 75 yards, 1:53) | APST 38–17 |
| 4 | 08:22 | APST | Christian Wells 20-yard pass from Zac Thomas (Chandler Staton kick) (7 plays, 56 yards, 3:33) | APST 45–17 |

| Statistics | Arkansas State | Appalachian State |
|---|---|---|
| First downs | 24 | 22 |
| Total yards | 368 | 521 |
| Rushing yards | 73 | 305 |
| Passing yards | 295 | 216 |
| Turnovers | 2 | 2 |
| Time of possession | 30:43 | 29:17 |

| Team | Category | Player | Statistics |
|---|---|---|---|
| Arkansas State | Passing | Layne Hatcher | 9/16, 178 yards, 1 INT |
| Arkansas State | Rushing | Lincoln Pare | 5 carries, 46 yards, 1 TD |
| Arkansas State | Receiving | Jonathan Adams Jr. | 6 receptions, 134 yards |
| Appalachian State | Passing | Zac Thomas | 16/23, 216 yards, 4 TDs, 1 INT |
| Appalachian State | Rushing | Daetrich Harrington | 18 carries, 137 yards, 1 TD |
| Appalachian State | Receiving | Christian Wells | 3 receptions, 80 yards, 2 TDs |

=== Troy ===
Troy at Arkansas State

| Team | 1 | 2 | 3 | 4 | Total |
|---|---|---|---|---|---|
| • Trojans | 14 | 10 | 0 | 14 | 38 |
| Red Wolves | 0 | 3 | 7 | 0 | 10 |

- Date: October 31, 2020
- Location: Centennial Bank Stadium
  Jonesboro, AR
- Game start: 2:05 p.m. CDT
- Elapsed time: 3 hours and 15 minutes
- Game attendance: 6,757
- Game weather: 61 °F (16 °C) • Weather: Mostly Clear • Wind: SSE 6 MPH
- Referee: T. Livingston
- TV announcers (ESPN3): Roger Twibell (play–by–play), Pete Cordelli (analyst), and Cori Keller (sideline reporter)

Scoring summary
| 1 | 12:35 | TROY | Luke Whittemore 29-yard pass from Jacob Free (Evan Legasssey kick) (7 plays, 73 yards, 2:25) | TROY 7–0 |
| 1 | 05:39 | TROY | Reggie Todd 34-yard pass from Jacob Free (Evan Legasssey kick) (7 plays, 79 yards, 2:19) | TROY 14–0 |
| 2 | 09:10 | ARST | Blake Grupe 39-yard field goal (12 plays, 76 yards, 4:36) | TROY 14–3 |
| 2 | 07:07 | TROY | Evan Legasssey 35-yard field goal (6 plays, 36 yards, 2:03) | TROY 17–3 |
| 2 | 00:41 | TROY | Jacob Free 6-yard rush (Evan Legasssey kick) (8 plays, 64 yards, 1:47) | TROY 24–3 |
| 3 | 04:55 | ARST | Jonathan Adams Jr. 3-yard pass from Layne Hatcher (Blake Grupe kick) (5 plays, 90 yards, 1:23) | TROY 24–10 |
| 4 | 07:34 | TROY | Darrell Starling 20-yard fumble returned (Evan Legasssey kick) (6 plays, 17 yards, 1:41) | TROY 31–10 |
| 4 | 00:26 | TROY | Kimani Vidal 8-yard rush (Evan Legasssey kick) (10 plays, 41 yards, 5:25) | TROY 38–10 |

| Statistics | Troy | Arkansas State |
|---|---|---|
| First downs | 27 | 21 |
| Total yards | 487 | 379 |
| Rushing yards | 68 | 108 |
| Passing yards | 419 | 271 |
| Turnovers | 0 | 1 |
| Time of possession | 33:10 | 26:50 |

| Team | Category | Player | Statistics |
|---|---|---|---|
| Troy | Passing | Jacob Free | 33/45, 419 yards, 2 TDs |
| Troy | Rushing | Kimani Vidal | 17 carries, 58 yards, 1 TD |
| Troy | Receiving | Kaylon Geiger | 8 receptions, 126 yards |
| Arkansas State | Passing | Layne Hatcher | 11/20, 166 yards, 1 TD |
| Arkansas State | Rushing | Lincoln Pare | 12 carries, 90 yards |
| Arkansas State | Receiving | Dahu Green | 4 receptions, 75 yards |

=== At Louisiana ===
Arkansas State at Louisiana

| Team | 1 | 2 | 3 | 4 | Total |
|---|---|---|---|---|---|
| Red Wolves | 3 | 3 | 0 | 14 | 20 |
| • RV Ragin' Cajuns | 0 | 0 | 14 | 13 | 27 |

- Date: November 7, 2020
- Location: Cajun Field
  Lafayette, LA
- Game start: 11:02 a.m. CST
- Elapsed time: 3 hours and 22 minutes
- Game attendance: 5,585
- Game weather: 76 °F (24 °C) • Weather: Mostly Cloudy • Wind: ENE 6 MPH
- Referee: Kyle Olson
- TV announcers (ESPNU): Dave Neal (play–by–play) and DJ Shockley (analyst)

Scoring summary
| 1 | 00:27 | ARST | Blake Grupe 24-yard field goal (11 plays, 39 yards, 4:32) | ARST 3–0 |
| 2 | 06:37 | ARST | Blake Grupe 35-yard field goal (11 plays, 33 yards, 4:15) | ARST 6–0 |
| 3 | 13:38 | LA | Levi Lewis 33-yard rush (Nate Snyder kick) (4 plays, 63 yards, 1:22) | LA 7–6 |
| 3 | 05:56 | LA | Dontae Fleming 52-yard pass from Levi Lewis (Nate Snyder kick) (2 plays, 74 yards, 0:54) | LA 14–6 |
| 4 | 10:37 | ARST | Jamal Jones 4-yard rush (two-point conversion pass attempt failed) (11 plays, 80 yards, 4:19) | LA 14–12 |
| 4 | 13:38 | LA | Kenneth Almendares 35-yard field goal (6 plays, 51 yards, 2:09) | LA 17–12 |
| 4 | 03:59 | LA | Kenneth Almendares 43-yard field goal (5 plays, 23 yards, 2:07) | LA 20–12 |
| 4 | 02:24 | ARST | Brandon Bowling 47-yard pass from Layne Hatcher (Layne Hatcher two-point conversion pass to Jonathan Adams Jr.) (4 plays, 91 yards, 1:25) | TIE 20–20 |
| 4 | 01:13 | LA | Elijah Mitchell 2-yard rush (Kenneth Almendares kick) (6 plays, 61 yards, 1:07) | LA 27–20 |

| Statistics | Arkansas State | Louisiana |
|---|---|---|
| First downs | 24 | 19 |
| Total yards | 423 | 440 |
| Rushing yards | 199 | 196 |
| Passing yards | 224 | 244 |
| Turnovers | 2 | 1 |
| Time of possession | 31:45 | 28:15 |

| Team | Category | Player | Statistics |
|---|---|---|---|
| Arkansas State | Passing | Logan Bonner | 16/30, 127 yards, 2 INTs |
| Arkansas State | Rushing | Lincoln Pare | 22 carries, 121 yards |
| Arkansas State | Receiving | Jonathan Adams Jr. | 8 receptions, 95 yards |
| Louisiana | Passing | Levi Lewis | 17/29, 244 yards, 1 TD, 1 INT |
| Louisiana | Rushing | Elijah Mitchell | 16 carries, 90 yards, 1 TD |
| Louisiana | Receiving | Neal Johnson | 5 receptions, 68 yards |

=== At Texas State ===
Arkansas State at Texas State

| Team | 1 | 2 | 3 | 4 | Total |
|---|---|---|---|---|---|
| Red Wolves | 3 | 21 | 7 | 14 | 45 |
| • Bobcats | 10 | 17 | 0 | 20 | 47 |

- Date: November 21, 2020
- Location: Bobcat Stadium
  San Marcos, TX
- Game start: 11:02 a.m. CDT
- Elapsed time: 3 hours and 32 minutes
- Game attendance: 5,218
- Game weather: 72 °F (22 °C) • Weather: Partly Cloudy • Wind: ESE 7 MPH
- Referee: Jeremy Parker
- TV announcers (ESPN2): John Schriffen (play–by–play) and Jay Walker (analyst)

Scoring summary
| 1 | 12:19 | TXST | Javen Banks 40-yard pass from Brady McBride (Seth Keller kick) (6 plays, 75 yards, 2:41) | TXST 7–0 |
| 1 | 12:19 | TXST | Seth Keller 41-yard field goal (7 plays, 45 yards, 2:49) | TXST 10–0 |
| 1 | 03:47 | ARST | Blake Grupe 40-yard field goal (7 plays, 65 yards, 2:33) | TXST 10–3 |
| 2 | 12:59 | ARST | Jonathan Adams Jr. 13-yard pass from Logan Bonner (Blake Grupe kick) (10 plays, 70 yards, 4:27) | TIE 10–10 |
| 2 | 11:52 | TXST | Jeremiah Haydel 47-yard pass from Brady McBride (Seth Keller kick) (3 plays, 76 yards, 1:01) | TXST 17–10 |
| 2 | 09:56 | TXST | Trevis Graham Jr. 14-yard pass from Brady McBride (Seth Keller kick); 2 plays, 35 yards, 0:36) | TXST 24–10 |
| 2 | 05:04 | ARST | Marcel Murray 1-yard rush (Blake Grupe kick) (12 plays, 75 yards, 4:52) | TXST 24–17 |
| 2 | 00:16 | ARST | Jonathan Adams Jr. 30-yard pass from Layne Hatcher (Blake Grupe kick) (10 plays, 91 yards, 3:55) | TIE 24–24 |
| 2 | 00:00 | TXST | Seth Keller 48-yard field goal (4 plays, 44 yards, 0:16) | TXST 27–24 |
| 3 | 08:18 | ARST | Jeff Foreman 84-yard pass from Layne Hatcher (Blake Grupe kick) (3 plays, 84 yards, 1:41) | ARST 31–27 |
| 4 | 13:50 | ARST | Giles Amos 8-yard pass from Logan Bonner (Blake Grupe kick) (13 plays, 96 yards, 5:57) | ARST 38–27 |
| 4 | 11:39 | TXST | Marcell Barbee 5-yard pass from Brady McBride (Seth Keller kick) (5 plays, 69 yards, 2:11) | ARST 38–34 |
| 4 | 07:01 | TXST | Trevis Graham Jr. 15-yard pass from Brady McBride (Seth Keller kick) (7 plays, 74 yards, 2:58) | TXST 41–38 |
| 4 | 01:43 | TXST | Jamal Jones 1-yard rush (Blake Grupe kick) (12 plays, 65 yards, 5:09) | ARST 45–41 |
| 4 | 00:34 | TXST | Calvin Hill 6-yard rush (Seth Keller kick) (7 plays, 57 yards, 1:02) | TXST 47–45 |

| Statistics | Arkansas State | Texas State |
|---|---|---|
| First downs | 30 | 27 |
| Total yards | 654 | 505 |
| Rushing yards | 192 | 62 |
| Passing yards | 462 | 443 |
| Turnovers | 1 | 0 |
| Time of possession | 37:37 | 22:23 |

| Team | Category | Player | Statistics |
|---|---|---|---|
| Arkansas State | Passing | Layne Hatcher | 10/22, 254 yards, 2 TDs |
| Arkansas State | Rushing | Jamal Jones | 16 carries, 106 yards, 1 TD |
| Arkansas State | Receiving | Jeff Foreman | 3 receptions, 148 yards, 1 TD |
| Texas State | Passing | Brady McBride | 32/45, 443 yards, 5 TDs |
| Texas State | Rushing | Calvin Hill | 6 carries, 49 yards, 1 TD |
| Texas State | Receiving | Jeremiah Haydel | 5 receptions, 94 yards, 1 TD |

=== South Alabama ===
South Alabama at Arkansas State

| Team | 1 | 2 | 3 | 4 | Total |
|---|---|---|---|---|---|
| • Jaguars | 7 | 7 | 14 | 10 | 38 |
| Red Wolves | 7 | 10 | 7 | 7 | 31 |

- Date: November 28, 2020
- Location: Centennial Bank Stadium
  Jonesboro, AR
- Game start: 2:05 p.m. CST
- Elapsed time: 3 hours and 39 minutes
- Game attendance: 4,013
- Referee: T. Livingston
- TV announcers (ESPN3): Roger Twibell (play–by–play), Pete Cordelli (analyst), and Cori Keller (sideline reporter)

Scoring summary
| 1 | 08:50 | ARST | Brandon Bowling 3-yard pass from Logan Bonner (Blake Grupe kick) (9 plays, 69 yards, 3:31) | ARST 7–0 |
| 1 | 00:35 | USA | Desmond Trotter 2-yard rush (Diego Guajardo kick) (10 plays, 72 yards, 3:57) | TIE 7–7 |
| 2 | 11:23 | USA | Kawaan Baker 26-yard pass from Desmond Trotter (Diego Guajardo kick) (8 plays, 64 yards, 3:19) | USA 14–7 |
| 2 | 01:09 | ARST | Brandon Bowling 25-yard pass from Logan Bonner (Blake Grupe kick) (8 plays, 75 yards, 3:19) | TIE 14–14 |
| 2 | 00:00 | ARST | Blake Grupe 35-yard field goal (4 plays, 64 yards, 0:31) | ARST 17–14 |
| 3 | 09:55 | ARST | Jonathan Adams Jr. 14-yard pass from Logan Bonner (Blake Grupe kick) (9 plays, 75 yards, 4:59) | ARST 24–14 |
| 3 | 06:39 | USA | Jalen Tolbert 42-yard pass from Desmond Trotter (Diego Guajardo kick) (8 plays, 82 yards, 3:10) | ARST 24–21 |
| 3 | 00:34 | USA | Jalen Tolbert 37-yard pass from Tanner McGee (Diego Guajardo kick) (6 plays, 73 yards, 2:38) | USA 28–24 |
| 4 | 12:03 | ARST | Jonathan Adams Jr. 3-yard pass from Logan Bonner (Blake Grupe kick) (8 plays, 71 yards, 3:24) | ARST 31–28 |
| 4 | 04:56 | USA | Jalen Tolbert 51-yard pass from Tanner McGee (Diego Guajardo kick) (5 plays, 61 yards, 1:59) | USA 35–31 |
| 4 | 01:24 | USA | Diego Guajardo 30-yard field goal (6 plays, 19 yards, 1:56) | USA 38–31 |

| Statistics | South Alabama | Arkansas State |
|---|---|---|
| First downs | 25 | 25 |
| Total yards | 486 | 494 |
| Rushing yards | 99 | 170 |
| Passing yards | 387 | 324 |
| Turnovers | 1 | 0 |
| Time of possession | 31:03 | 28:57 |

| Team | Category | Player | Statistics |
|---|---|---|---|
| South Alabama | Passing | Desmond Trotter | 16/22, 242 yards, 2 TDs |
| South Alabama | Rushing | Carlos Davis | 12 carries, 31 yards |
| South Alabama | Receiving | Jalen Tolbert | 10 receptions, 252 yards, 3 TDs |
| Arkansas State | Passing | Logan Bonner | 11/16, 183 yards, 4 TDs |
| Arkansas State | Rushing | Jamal Jones | 19 carries, 93 yards |
| Arkansas State | Receiving | Jonathan Adams Jr. | 9 receptions, 138 yards, 2 TDs |

== Rankings ==
Ranking movements Legend: — = Not ranked RV = Received votes
| | Week | | | | | | | | | | | | | | | |
| Poll | Pre | 1 | 2 | 3 | 4 | 5 | 6 | 7 | 8 | 9 | 10 | 11 | 12 | 13 | 14 | Final |
|---|---|---|---|---|---|---|---|---|---|---|---|---|---|---|---|---|
| AP | — | | RV | | | | | | | | | | | | | |
| Coaches | — | | RV | | | | | | | | | | | | | |
| CFP | Not released | | | | | | | | | | | | | | | Not released |
