= Layne Hatcher =

American college football player (born 1999)

No. 18, 3
- Position: Quarterback

Personal information
- Born: February 15, 1999 (age 27); Little Rock, Arkansas, U.S.
- Listed height: 5 ft 10 in (1.78 m)
- Listed weight: 216 lb (98 kg)

Career information
- High school: Pulaski (Pleasant Valley, Arkansas)
- College: Alabama (2018); Arkansas State (2019–2021); Texas State (2022); Ball State (2023)

Awards and highlights
- Sun Belt Freshman of the Year (2019)
- Stats at ESPN

Layne Hatcher (born February 15, 1999) is an American former college football quarterback who played for the Alabama Crimson Tide, Arkansas State Red Wolves, Texas State Bobcats and Ball State Cardinals.

== Early life ==
Hatcher was born on February 15, 1999, in Little Rock, Arkansas. He attended and played high school football for Pulaski Academy in Pleasant Valley, Arkansas.

Hatcher was a three-year varsity starter for the school and he finished as Arkansas high school football's all-time leader in passing yards and touchdowns with 15,483 yards and 185 touchdowns. As a starter he had a record of 41–1 including four-straight Class 5A state championships. As a senior in 2017 he passed for 5,779 yards and 66 touchdowns. He was an All-Conference and All-State player for his sophomore through senior year while also earning the honors of Arkansas Democrat-Gazette All-Arkansas Preps Offensive Player of the Year, Hootens.com 5A Offensive Player of the Year, and Gatorade Arkansas Football Player of the Year during his senior year.

College recruiting
Name	Hometown	School	Height	Weight	Commit date
Layne Hatcher; QB	Little Rock, Arkansas	Pulaski Academy	6 ft 1 (Note: listed at 6'2 by rivals.com and 6'0 by 247sports.com) in (1.85 m)	198 lb (90 kg)	May 25, 2018
Layne Hatcher; QB	Recruit ratings: Scout: Rivals: 247Sports: ESPN:				
Overall recruit ranking: 247Sports: 2,176
Note: In many cases, Scout, Rivals, 247Sports, On3, and ESPN may conflict in their listings of height and weight.; In these cases, the average was taken. ESPN grades are on a 100-point scale.; Sources: "2018 Team Ranking". Rivals.com.

== College career ==
=== Alabama ===
After originally committing to Arkansas State, Hatcher switched his commitment to Alabama. He did not play for the Crimson Tide, but was a member of the team's Orange Bowl win and during their appearance against Clemson in the National Championship. After the season he announced his intent to transfer from the team.

=== Arkansas State ===
On April 15, 2019, Hatcher committed to Arkansas State—the school he originally committed to out of high school.

Hatcher entered the 2019 season as the backup to incumbent starter Logan Bonner. He made his college football debut against No. 3 Georgia in week three. He entered the game early in the fourth quarter with nine minutes left. After three straight runs by running back DJ Chatman, Hatcher completed his first career pass for 45 yards to Jonathan Adams Jr. After another run and a completion to Bubba Ogbebor, he threw his first career interception to Lewis Cine in the redzone. He finished the game going three of five for 53 yards and an interception. He also ran the ball once for five yards. He made his first career start against Troy in week five as Bonner was dealing with an injury to his throwing hand. In his debut he threw for 440 yards and four touchdowns in a 50–43 win over the Trojans. Following the game he was named a Manning Award Star of the Week winner. Bonner's hand injury would sideline him for the rest of the season as Hatcher became the fulltime starter. After losing back-to-back games against Georgia State and Louisiana he led the team to four straight wins over Texas State, Louisiana–Monroe, Coastal Carolina, and Georgia Southern. In that span he threw for 300 yards twice against Louisiana–Monroe in the team's 48–41 win and against Georgia Southern in the team's 38–33 win. To finish off the regular season the team fell to South Alabama 30–34 as Hatcher once again threw for 300 yards. The team earned a bid in the Camellia Bowl against FIU. Facing off against James Morgan and the Panthers, he threw for 393 yards, for his third-straight 300-yard performance, and four touchdowns. After a punt on FIU's first possession, he led the Red Wolves on a fifteen-play-80-yard touchdown drive that ended with a four yard touchdown pass to Omar Bayless. The team won 34–26 to finish the season 6–3. He finished the season with 27 touchdown passes, which was good enough for tied-second all-time in program history. Following the season he was named Sun Belt Conference Freshman of the Year.

In 2020, with Bonner back as the starter, Hatcher maintained his role as a backup like the start of the previous season. Despite not starting a game for the Red Wolves, he finished as the team's leading passer. Bonner and Hatcher alternated drives in the team's season-opener against Memphis. With Bonner getting the start and leading a touchdown drive on the first drive of the game he stayed in for the second drive and went three-and-out. Hatcher came in on the team's third drive and led an eight play drive for 84 yards that ended in a one-yard touchdown run for Isaiah Azubuike. The two would continue to switch in, and out, of the game as Bonner finished with two interceptions and Hatcher finished as the team's leading passer as they lost 24–37. Against Kansas State, Bonner once again started, but Hatcher threw the game-winning touchdown pass with 38 seconds left in the game to Jonathan Adams Jr. for a seventeen yard touchdown. He was named the Manning Award Star of the Week following the game. The team's game against Central Arkansas was postponed and the game against Tulsa was canceled due to COVID-19. Hatcher had his best performance against Georgia State as he threw for 332 yards and four touchdowns along with being in the game during the team's game-winning drive. He would lead the team in passing against Appalachian State, Troy, Texas State, and Louisiana-Monroe. Against Louisiana–Monroe he threw for five touchdown passes on fourteen attempts and 326 yards. Following the 48–15 win he was given his second Manning Award Star of the Week honor. The team's final game of the season against FCS opponent Incarnate Word was canceled. He was named as an honorable mention for the All-Sun Belt Team.

In 2021, Hatcher started the season off as a backup to incoming Florida State transfer James Blackman. Prior to the season he participated in the 2021 Manning Passing Academy. He was also named to the Athlon Sports Preseason All-Sun Belt Conference third team and to PFF Preseasons All-Sun Belt Conference second team. Hatcher made his season debut in reserve for Blackman against Central Arkansas. He came in late in the third quarter up 20–7, on his first drive he led the team to a touchdown. He finished the game completing all twelve of his pass attempts for 150 yards and four touchdowns. He got the start the following week against Memphis, but did not finish the game as he was taken out in the third down 23–41. He played sparingly in the team's 3–52 loss against Washington, and did not play against Tulsa. He did not start the next two games against Georgia Southern and No. 15 Coastal Carolina as the team dropped its fifth straight game. After leading the team in passing against Coastal Carolina and an injury to Blackman, Hatcher was named the starter for the remainder of the season. The team would continue to lose despite the quarterback change as the lost against Louisiana, South Alabama, and Appalachian State, before a 444-yard passing performance against Louisiana–Monroe propelled them to their second, and final, win on the season. They would lose the final two games against Georgia State and Texas State to finish 2–10. On December 1, 2021, he announced that he was going to enter the transfer portal following three seasons with the team. He finished his career with the school ninth all-time in total plays with 1,018, fourth in net yards with 7,434, second in average yards per play with 7.3, third in average yards per game with 232.3, fifth in passes attempted and passes completed with 846 and 521 respectively, fourth in net passing yards with 7,427, third in touchdown passes with 65, and fifth in completion percentage 61.6%.

=== Texas State ===
On December 12, 2021, Hatcher committed to Texas State. Prior to the season he was named to the Phil Steele Preseason All-Sun Belt Fourth Team and Athlon Sports Preseason All-Sun Belt Fourth Team. He also participated in the 2022 Manning Passing Academy for a second-straight season.

Hatcher was named the team's starter heading into week one against Nevada heading into the 2022 season. In his debut against Nevada he went 34 of 52 for 293 yards and a pair of touchdowns and interceptions. He threw his first touchdown with them in the second quarter on a twenty-yard pass to Ashtyn Hawkin. The team lost 14–38. In a three touchdown performance the next week against FIU he led the team to its first win of the season. He threw for three touchdowns and 226 yards in the 41–12 win. After falling to No. 17 Baylor 7–42 he bounced back with a season-high 362 yards against Houston Christian. After losing to James Madison and beating Appalachian State the team went on a four-game losing streak. He threw for over 200 yards in three of the four games against Troy, Southern Miss, and Louisiana–Monroe. Against his former team, Arkansas State, he led the team to its fourth, and final, win. In the 16–13 win over the Red Wolves he went 23 of 36 for 196 yards and no touchdowns. They dropped the last game of the season 13–41 against Louisiana to finish the year 4–8. On November 28, 2022, Hatcher announced that he would transfer for a third time as a graduate transfer.

=== Ball State ===
On December 18, 2022, Hatcher committed to Ball State.

=== College statistics ===
Season	Team	Games			Passing								Rushing			
Season	Team	GP	GS	Record	Comp	Att	Pct	Yards	Avg	TD	Int	Rate	Att	Yards	Avg	TD
2018	Alabama	Redshirt														
2019	Arkansas State	10	9	6–3	204	310	65.8	2,946	9.5	27	10	167.9	79	46	0.6	1
2020	Arkansas State	11	0	—	116	194	59.8	2,058	10.6	19	2	179.2	43	15	0.3	0
2021	Arkansas State	11	7	1–6	201	341	58.9	2,423	7.1	19	13	129.4	50	-54	-1.1	1
2022	Texas State	12	12	4–8	275	442	62.2	2,653	5.8	19	10	122.3	50	-151	-3.0	1
2023	Ball State	7	3	0–3	64	98	65.3	582	6.3	4	1	126.6	20	-53	-2.7	1
Career		51	31	11−20	860	1,386	62.0	10,662	7.7	88	36	142.4	242	-197	-0.8	4

== Professional career ==
Pre-draft measurables
Height	Weight	Arm length	Hand span	20-yard shuttle	Three-cone drill	Vertical jump	Broad jump
5 ft 10 1/4 in (1.78 m)	213 lb (97 kg)	30 3/4 in (0.78 m)	9 1/8 in (0.23 m)	4.52 s	7.58 s	28.0 in (0.71 m)	8 ft 3 in (2.51 m)
All values from Pro Day

== Personal life ==
Hatcher is the son of Lee and Greg Hatcher. He has four sisters that all played either college basketball or college soccer.
