= 1950 Arkansas State Indians football team =

American college football season

1950 Arkansas State Indians football
- Conference: Arkansas Intercollegiate Conference
- Record: 6–3 ( AIC)
- Head coach: Forrest England (5th season)
- Home stadium: Kays Stadium

The 1950 Arkansas State Indians football team represented Arkansas State College—now known as Arkansas State University—as a member of the Arkansas Intercollegiate Conference (AIC) during the 1950 college football season. Led by fifth-year head coach Forrest England, the Indians compiled an overall record of 6–3.

== Schedule ==
Date	Opponent	Site	Result	Attendance	Source
September 23	at Mississippi State	Scott Field; Starkville, MS	L 0–67	8,000	
October 9	at Ouachita Baptist	Arkadelphia, AR	W 20–0		
October 15	Delta State	Kays Stadium; Jonesboro, AR	L 6–19		
October 21	Troy State	Kays Stadium; Jonesboro, AR	W 27–0		
October 28	Southern Illinois	Kays Stadium; Jonesboro, AR	W 46–0		
November 4	at Missouri Valley	Marshall, MO	W 21–20		
November 11	at Memphis State	Crump Stadium; Memphis, TN (rivalry)	L 7–60		
November 18	Henderson State	Kays Stadium; Jonesboro, AR	W 27–13		
November 23	at Union (TN)	Jackson Stadium; Jackson, TN	W 47–0		
