= Dennis Meyer =

American football player (1950–2026)

No. 41
- Positions: Safety, return specialist

Personal information
- Born: April 8, 1950; Jefferson City, Missouri, U.S.
- Died: October 5, 2026 (aged 76); The Villages, Florida, U.S.
- Listed height: 5 ft 11 in (1.80 m)
- Listed weight: 186 lb (84 kg)

Career information
- High school: Jefferson City
- College: Arkansas State
- NFL draft: 1972: 6th round, 143rd overall pick

Career history
- Pittsburgh Steelers (1973); Portland Storm (1974); Calgary Stampeders (1975–1976)

Awards and highlights
- First-team Little All-American (1971)

Career NFL statistics
- Fumble recoveries: 2
- Return yards: 80
- Stats at Pro Football Reference

John Dennis Meyer (April 8, 1950 – October 5, 2026) was an American professional football player who was a defensive back in the National Football League (NFL) and Canadian Football League (CFL). After his playing career, he coached in the CFL and at the high school level.

== College career ==
Meyer was a two-time All-American defensive back for the Arkansas State Red Wolves, intercepting a school-record 27 passes in his career, including a program-high 11 picks during the 1970 season. He was the Southland Conference Defensive Player of the Year in 1970 and 1971 and the MVP of the Pecan Bowl in 1970, where he had two interceptions in a 38-21 win over Central Missouri. In 1991, Meyer was inducted into the Arkansas State Hall of Honor and named a starting defensive back on the school's All-Centennial Team in 2014.

== Professional career ==
Meyer was drafted by the Pittsburgh Steelers in the sixth round of the 1972 NFL Draft, but a knee injury forced him to miss the 1972 season. In 1973, he appeared in 11 games for the Steelers as a safety and punt returner. Meyer was cut by Pittsburgh before the 1974 season and signed with the Portland Storm of the World Football League (WFL). He later signed with the Atlanta Falcons for 1975, but was cut before the season started. He subsequently signed with the Calgary Stampeders of the Canadian Football League, where he played two seasons.

== Coaching career ==
After his retirement as a player, Meyer was hired to coach Calgary's defensive backfield. In 1982, he joined the Toronto Argonauts as defensive backfield and special teams coach. He was promoted to defensive coordinator and, in 1992, he replaced Adam Rita as head coach of the Argonauts. He had a 3–4 record over the team's final seven games and missed the playoffs. He was fired after a 1–9 start in 1993 and replaced by Bob O'Billovich. During his time in Toronto, the team won the Grey Cup two times (1983 and 1991).

Following his time in the CFL, he taught and coached at the high school level before retiring to The Villages, Florida, in 2015.

== Death ==
Meyer died in The Villages, Florida, on October 5, 2026, at the age of 76.
