= 2007 Arkansas State Indians football team =

American college football season

2007 Arkansas State Indians football
- Conference: Sun Belt Conference
- Record: 5–7 (3–4 Sun Belt)
- Head coach: Steve Roberts (6th season)
- Offensive coordinator: Doug Ruse (6th season)
- Co-defensive coordinators: Kevin Corless (6th season); Jack Curtis (6th season)
- Home stadium: ASU Stadium

2007 Sun Belt Conference football standings
	Conf.			Overall
Team	W		L	W		L
Florida Atlantic +	6	–	1	8	–	5
Troy +	6	–	1	8	–	4
Middle Tennessee	4	–	3	5	–	7
Louisiana–Monroe	4	–	3	6	–	6
Arkansas State	3	–	4	5	–	7
Louisiana–Lafayette	3	–	4	3	–	9
FIU	1	–	6	1	–	11
North Texas	1	–	6	2	–	10
+ – Conference co-champions

The 2007 Arkansas State Indians football team represented Arkansas State University as a member of the Sun Belt Conference the 2007 NCAA Division I FBS football season. Led by sixth-year head coach Steve Roberts, the Indians compiled an overall record of 5–7 with a mark of 3–4 in conference play, tying for fifth place in the Sun Belt. Arkansas State's offense scored 291 points while the defense allowed 331 points. It was the last season that Arkansas State played under the Indians name before adopting the moniker of the Red Wolves.

== Schedule ==
Date	Time	Opponent	Site	TV	Result	Attendance
September 1	6:00 p.m.	at No. 4 Texas*	Darrell K Royal–Texas Memorial Stadium; Austin, TX	FSN, PPV	L 13–21	84,440
September 15	6:00 p.m.	SMU*	ASU Stadium; Jonesboro, AR		W 45–28	17,465
September 22	6:00 p.m.	at Tennessee*	Neyland Stadium; Knoxville, TN	PPV	L 27–48	102,368
September 27	6:00 p.m.	Memphis*	ASU Stadium; Jonesboro, AR (Paint Bucket Bowl)		W 35–31	27,774
October 6	6:00 p.m.	at Louisiana–Monroe	Malone Stadium; Monroe, LA		L 13–30	12,088
October 13	6:00 p.m.	Louisiana–Lafayette^{†}	ASU Stadium; Jonesboro, AR		W 52–21	18,242
October 20	2:30 p.m.	at Middle Tennessee	Johnny "Red" Floyd Stadium; Murfreesboro, TN		L 7–24	12,505
October 27	6:00 p.m.	Troy	ASU Stadium; Jonesboro, AR	ESPN Plus	L 0–27	14,694
November 3	2:00 p.m.	FIU	ASU Stadium; Jonesboro, AR	ESPN Plus	W 27–24	12,326
November 10	3:00 p.m.	at Florida Atlantic	Lockhart Stadium; Fort Lauderdale, FL		L 31–34	18,540
November 15	6:00 p.m.	North Texas	ASU Stadium; Jonesboro, AR	ESPN Plus	W 31–27	11,736
November 24	2:00 p.m.	at Southern Miss*	M. M. Roberts Stadium; Hattiesburg, MS		L 10–16	17,705
*Non-conference game; ^{†}Homecoming; Rankings from AP Poll released prior to the game; All times are in Central time

== Postseason ==
The Indians failed to qualify for a bowl game. After the season ended, consideration was made about the team's Indians nickname. They had used the Indians nickname since adopting it in 1951. Due to a National Collegiate Athletic Association ruling to prohibit depictions of Native Americans as mascots, with a few exceptions, Arkansas State opted to retire the Indians moniker and Indian Family mascots. Arkansas State did have the option to appeal to a Native American tribe and have them adopt the mascot for approval so it could continue to be used under NCAA guidelines, but the University chose not to in 2005. Despite legal fees being offered to fight the ruling, the University instead opted to consult with fans and alumni as to what to replace it with. They opted for Red Wolves as the new name and played the 2008 season onwards as the Arkansas State Red Wolves. A tribute to the original name remains with a popular fans' shirt bearing the slogan "My Indian name is Red Wolf".
