= Jerry Muckensturm =

American football player (born 1953)

No. 58
- Position: Linebacker

Personal information
- Born: October 13, 1953 (age 73); Belleville, Illinois, U.S.
- Listed height: 6 ft 4 in (1.93 m)
- Listed weight: 223 lb (101 kg)

Career information
- High school: Althoff (IL)
- College: Arkansas State
- NFL draft: 1976: 7th round, 190th overall pick

Career history
- Chicago Bears (1976–1983)

Career NFL statistics
- Games played - started: 81-31
- Interceptions: 3
- Fumble recoveries: 3
- Stats at Pro Football Reference

Jerry Ray Muckensturm (born October 13, 1953) is an American former professional football player who was a linebacker for seven seasons with the Chicago Bears of the National Football League (NFL). He played college football for Arkansas State Red Wolves.

Muckensturm was injured in the Chicago Bears Week 3 contest in 1983 against the New Orleans Saints on September 17, 1983, just one month shy of his 30th birthday. Muckensturm was injured on a kickoff and had to be carried off the field by his teammates after suffering a leg injury that ended his career.
