= Alex Carrington =

American football player (born 1987)

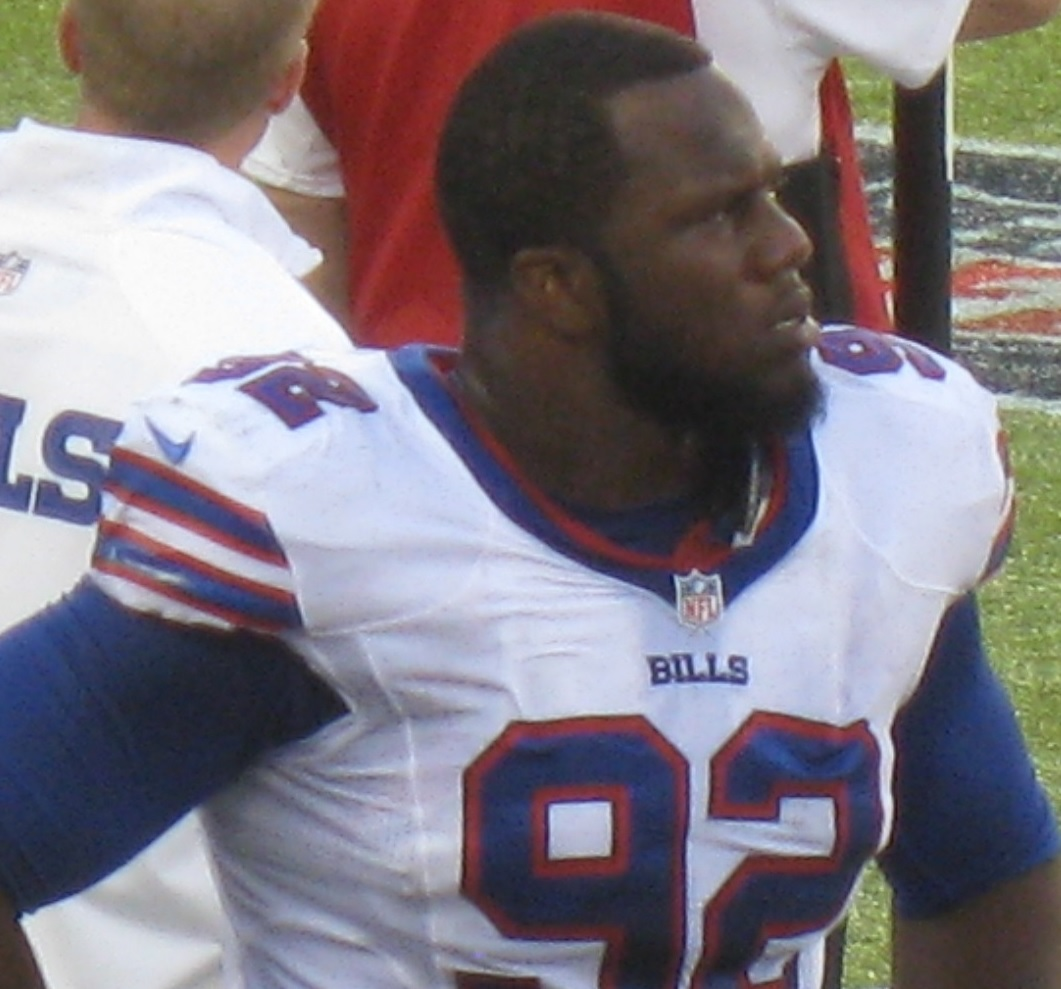
- Carrington with the Buffalo Bills in 2013

No. 92, 98
- Position: Defensive end

Personal information
- Born: June 19, 1987 (age 39); Tupelo, Mississippi, U.S.
- Listed height: 6 ft 5 in (1.96 m)
- Listed weight: 301 lb (137 kg)

Career information
- High school: Tupelo (MS)
- College: Arkansas State
- NFL draft: 2010: 3rd round, 72nd overall pick

Career history
- Buffalo Bills (2010–2013); St. Louis Rams (2014); Buffalo Bills (2015); Houston Texans (2016)*
- * Offseason or practice squad member only

Awards and highlights
- Sun Belt Defensive Player of the Year (2008); First-team All-Sun Belt (2008, 2009)

Career NFL statistics
- Games played: 59
- Total tackles: 62
- Sacks: 4
- Forced fumbles: 1
- Stats at Pro Football Reference

Alex Carrington (born June 19, 1987) is an American former professional football player who was a defensive end in the National Football League (NFL). He was selected by the Buffalo Bills in the third round of the 2010 NFL draft. He played college football for the Arkansas State Red Wolves. He was also a member of the St. Louis Rams, and Houston Texans.

== Early life ==
Carrington attended Tupelo High School in his hometown of Tupelo, Mississippi. He recorded 84 tackles, six sacks and forced three fumbles as a senior, and was named to the all-region team. His only scholarship offer came from Arkansas State, which he accepted.

== College career ==
With the Red Wolves, Carrington was named the Sun Belt Defensive Player of the Year following the 2008 season after he made 10.5 sacks and 19 tackles for loss in 12 games. In his senior season, he recorded 41 tackles, including 14.5 for loss, and nine sacks and three forced fumbles. He also returned a fumble 27 yards for a touchdown against Western Kentucky.

He completed his career with 21.5 sacks, which ranks second best in school history and fourth highest in conference history.

== Professional career ==
=== Buffalo Bills (first stint) ===
Carrington was selected by the Buffalo Bills in the third round (72nd overall) of the 2010 NFL draft.

On July 19, 2010, Carrington signed a four-year contract with the Bills. At the start of the 2011 Training Camp, Carrington was moved to outside linebacker.

In 2012, Carrington blocked 4 kicks (3 field goals and an extra point) while playing special teams, a team record.

In 2013, following an injury against the New York Jets, Carrington was placed on injured reserve, effectively ending his season.

=== St Louis Rams ===
On March 25, 2014, he was signed by the St. Louis Rams.

=== Buffalo Bills (second stint) ===
On May 5, 2015, Carrington re-signed with the Bills. On November 30, 2015, he was placed on injured reserve.

=== Houston Texans ===
Carrington signed with the Texans. On August 23, 2016, Carrington was released by the Texans.
