= Richie Woit =

American football player (1931–2007)

No. 48
- Position: Defensive back

Personal information
- Born: July 5, 1931; Chicago, Illinois, U.S.
- Died: May 31, 2007 (aged 75); Chicago, Illinois, U.S.
- Listed height: 5 ft 8 in (1.73 m)
- Listed weight: 175 lb (79 kg)

Career information
- High school: Carl Schurz (Chicago)
- College: Arkansas State (1950–1953)
- NFL draft: 1954: 25th round, 301st overall pick

Career history
- Detroit Lions (1955)

Career NFL statistics
- Games played: 1
- Stats at Pro Football Reference

Richard Edward Woit (July 5, 1931 – May 31, 2007) was an American professional football defensive back. He played for the Detroit Lions in 1955.

He died of a heart attack on May 31, 2007, in Chicago, Illinois at age 75.
