= Calvin Harrell =

American gridiron football player (1949–1994)

No. 19
- Position: Running back

Personal information
- Born: September 7, 1949
- Died: 1994 (aged 44)
- Listed height: 6 ft 1 in (1.85 m)
- Listed weight: 222 lb (101 kg)

Career information
- College: Arkansas State
- NFL draft: 1972: 7th round, 180th overall pick

Career history
- 1972–1976: Edmonton Eskimos

Awards and highlights
- Grey Cup champion (1975); Second-team Little All-American (1971)

Calvin Harrell (September 7, 1949 – 1994) was a college American football and professional Canadian football running back, ranking among the top players in Arkansas State history. During Harrell's college career with the Indians (now renamed Red Wolves), the team under head coach Bennie Ellender played in three Pecan Bowls, one of the regional bowls that comprised the post season for the College Division of the NCAA, and won the national small college championship with an undefeated season in 1970.

== College career ==
At 6 feet 1 inch tall and weighing 222 pounds, Harrell was a tough running back for a rush oriented ASU offense. He ran for 2.935 yards in four seasons to rank 5th among the top rushers in team history and his career 18 100-yard games still ranks second all-time. His 1970 rushing performance against The Citadel with 252 yards is the second best single game yardage total in team history.

Harrell was a major force in the last two Pecan Bowls for the Indians, rushing for 160 and a touchdown in 1969 when ASU beat Drake University 29–21. He ran for 135 yards in the 1970 Pecan Bowl, a 38 to 21 win over Central Missouri State University that gave the Indians the number one ranking and the championship.

Harrell was selected an All-America College Division by the American Football Coaches Association in 1970 and 1971, as well as an Associated Press Second Team All-America in both years. Following his college career, he played in the 1971 North–South Shrine Game.

== Professional career ==
Following his collegiate career, Harrell was drafted by the Miami Dolphins of the National Football League in the seventh round of the 1972 NFL draft, but elected instead to play in the Canadian Football League. He played 5 seasons for the Edmonton Eskimos, gained 1,419 yards rushing on 346 carries and caught 116 passes for 1,203 yards in 45 CFL games. He scored 15 rushing touchdowns and added another seven receiving.

Harrell scored the only touchdown for the Eskimos in the 1974 Grey Cup, where they lost to the Montreal Alouettes, 20 to 7. He scored the touchdown on an eight-yard reception, fumbling before he reached the end zone. He managed to recover his own fumble for the score.

== Post-playing career ==
Harrell returned to Arkansas and his wife's hometown of Augusta after spending time in farming, police work, coaching and restaurants. He eventually joined Aetna Insurance.

Harrell died in 1994 at the age of 44.

== Honors ==
Following the 1973 season, Harrell was named to the Southland Conference All-First Decade team (1964–1973). He was also named to the All-Time ASU Team during the 1976 season.

Harrell was inducted into the Arkansas Sports Hall of Fame in 2003, was the first inductee in the Arkansas State University Ring of Honor in 1996 and had his number retired by the team in that same year. He was also inducted into the ASU Sports Hall of Honor in 1994.
