= 2009 Arkansas State Red Wolves football team =

American college football season

2009 Arkansas State Red Wolves football
- Conference: Sun Belt Conference
- Record: 4–8 (3–5 Sun Belt)
- Head coach: Steve Roberts (8th season)
- Offensive coordinator: Doug Ruse (8th season)
- Defensive coordinator: Kevin Corless (8th season)
- Home stadium: ASU Stadium

2009 Sun Belt Conference football standings
	Conf.			Overall
Team	W		L	W		L
Troy $	8	–	0	9	–	4
Middle Tennessee	7	–	1	10	–	3
Louisiana–Monroe	5	–	3	6	–	6
Florida Atlantic	5	–	3	5	–	7
Louisiana–Lafayette	4	–	4	6	–	6
Arkansas State	3	–	5	4	–	8
FIU	3	–	5	3	–	9
North Texas	1	–	7	2	–	10
Western Kentucky	0	–	8	0	–	12
$ – Conference champion

The 2009 Arkansas State Red Wolves football team represented Arkansas State University as a member of the Sun Belt Conference during the 2009 NCAA Division I FBS football season. Led by eighth-year head coach Steve Roberts, the Red Wolves compiled an overall record of 4–8 with a mark of 3–5 in conference play, tying for sixth place in the Sun Belt. Arkansas State played home games at ASU Stadium in Jonesboro, Arkansas

== Schedule ==
Date	Time	Opponent	Site	TV	Result	Attendance	Source
September 5	6:00 p.m.	Mississippi Valley State*	ASU Stadium; Jonesboro, AR		W 61–0	21,056	
September 12	1:00 p.m.	at No. 22 Nebraska*	Memorial Stadium; Lincoln, NE		L 9–38	85,035	
September 26	3:30 p.m.	Troy	ASU Stadium; Jonesboro, AR		L 27–30	23,641	
October 3	11:00 a.m.	at No. 13 Iowa*	Kinnick Stadium; Iowa City, IA	ESPN2	L 21–24	67,989	
October 13	7:00 p.m.	at Louisiana–Monroe	Malone Stadium; Monroe, LA	ESPN2	L 10–16	14,378	
October 24	6:00 p.m.	FIU^{†}	ASU Stadium; Jonesboro, AR		W 27–10	18,779	
October 31	2:30 p.m.	at Louisville*	Papa John's Cardinal Stadium; Louisville, KY		L 13–21	21,497	
November 7	2:30 p.m.	Louisiana–Lafayette	ASU Stadium; Jonesboro, AR		L 18–21	16,215	
November 14	3:00 p.m.	at Florida Atlantic	Lockhart Stadium; Fort Lauderdale, FL		L 18–35	16,218	
November 21	3:30 p.m.	at Middle Tennessee	Johnny "Red" Floyd Stadium; Murfreesboro, TN		L 14–38	19,111	
November 28	2:00 p.m.	North Texas	ASU Stadium; Jonesboro, AR		W 30–26	8,754	
December 3	6:00 p.m.	at Western Kentucky	Houchens Industries–L. T. Smith Stadium; Bowling Green, KY		W 24–20	4,513	
*Non-conference game; ^{†}Homecoming; Rankings from AP Poll released prior to the game; All times are in Central time
