= 2012 Liberty Bowl =

2012 AutoZone Liberty Bowl
- 54th Liberty Bowl
Iowa State Cyclones	Tulsa Golden Hurricane
(6–6)	(10–3)
Big 12	C-USA
17	31
Head coach: Paul Rhoads	Head coach: Bill Blankenship
	1	2	3	4	Total
Iowa State	17	0	0	0	17
Tulsa	7	14	7	3	31
- Date: December 31, 2012
- Season: 2012
- Stadium: Liberty Bowl Memorial Stadium
- Location: Memphis, Tennessee
- MVP: Trey Watts (RB, Tulsa)
- Favorite: Tulsa
- Referee: Alan Eck (MWC)
- Attendance: 53,687

United States TV coverage
- Network: ESPN
- Announcers: Mark Jones (Play-by-play); Brock Huard (Color commentary); Jessica Mendoza (sideline reporter)

The 2012 Liberty Bowl was a college football postseason bowl game held on December 31, 2012, at Liberty Bowl Memorial Stadium in Memphis, Tennessee. The 54th edition of the Liberty Bowl began at 2:30 p.m. CST and aired on ESPN. It featured the Iowa State Cyclones from the Big 12 Conference against the Conference USA champion Tulsa Golden Hurricane. It was the final game of the 2012 NCAA Division I FBS football season for both teams. With sponsorship from AutoZone, the game was officially the AutoZone Liberty Bowl.

The Golden Hurricane advanced to the game by virtue of winning the 2012 Conference USA Football Championship Game, while the Cyclones were also bowl-eligible due to their 6–6 regular-season record. The bowl was a rematch, as the two teams had met on September 1 at the Cyclones' home of Jack Trice Stadium in Ames, Iowa; Iowa State won that game, 38–23.

The pre-game buildup was primarily focused on the rematch. A slight plurality of experts picked Tulsa over Iowa State, but most predicted the game to be very close. Tulsa was considered a strong running team with a solid defense, while Iowa State was balanced offensively and struggled at times on defense. This was the only rematch of the 2012-13 college bowl season.

Tulsa won the game by a score of 31–17, led by Trey Watts' 25 rush, 149 yard effort along with a three-touchdown effort by Alex Singleton. Iowa State lost their quarterback, Sam Richardson, due to a "flu bug" in the fourth quarter. After Iowa State took a 17–7 lead, Tulsa scored 24 unanswered points to win 31–17.

== Teams ==
On November 30, Louisiana Tech was invited to play in the Independence Bowl but asked for more time as they were in negotiations with the Liberty Bowl and Heart of Dallas Bowl. Louisiana Tech athletic director Bruce Van De Velde and WAC commissioner Jeff Hurd both claimed that on December 1, the Liberty Bowl executive director Steve Ehrhart guaranteed the Bulldogs a bowl invite. After the Independence Bowl's deadline for Louisiana Tech to accept their invitation passed, the Independence Bowl selected the MAC's Ohio (8–4) instead. On December 2, the Liberty Bowl extended their remaining bid to Iowa State (6–6) instead of Louisiana Tech (9–3). The Liberty Bowl did not respond to The Times' request for comment on the situation. Louisiana Tech did not end up playing in any bowl game despite boasting the nation's top scoring offense.

Iowa State and Tulsa previously met on September 1, 2012, in Ames, Iowa. After taking a 16–7 lead, Tulsa gave up their lead allowing Iowa State to score 24 unanswered points. Iowa State went on to win 38–23.

=== Iowa State ===
Despite the Cyclones' ninth-place finish in the Big 12 with a 3–6 conference record, their record made them the Big 12's last bowl eligible team (the only team in the conference not to do so was the Kansas Jayhawks). They won three of their first four games in September beating Tulsa, Western Illinois, and Iowa. They lost on September 29 to conference foe Texas Tech. In October, the Cyclones went 2–2. They defeated #13 ranked TCU and Baylor, but lost to Kansas State and Oklahoma State. They lost three of their four games in November, but did manage to defeat Kansas, who were the only Big 12 team to finish with a worse in-conference record than Iowa State. 2012 was the Cyclones' second Liberty Bowl, following the 1972 game in which they lost to the Georgia Tech Yellow Jackets by a score of 31–30.

=== Tulsa ===
The Golden Hurricane won the Conference USA West Division championship with a 7–1 conference record. After defeating Central Florida by a score of 33–27 in overtime to win their second Conference USA title (and their first since winning the 2005 game over the same Knights), the conference's corresponding contingency plan for the 2012–13 NCAA Bowl season put the Golden Hurricane in the 2012 Liberty Bowl.

Tulsa lost their season opener to Iowa State 38–23. They then went on a seven-game winning streak defeating Tulane, Nicholls State, Fresno State, Alabama-Birmingham, Marshall, Texas El-Paso, and Rice. Their second loss of the season came on November 3, 2012, when they were defeated 19–15 by Arkansas after missing two extra points and a field goal. Tulsa won their next two games against Houston and Central Florida respectively. Their third and final loss of the regular season came on November 24 against Southern Methodist 35–27. Their regular season performance earned them a berth in the conference championship game in which they defeated Central Florida for the second time of the season. This was the Golden Hurricane's second Liberty Bowl, previously having won the 2005 game by defeating the Fresno State Bulldogs by a score of 31–24.

== Pregame buildup ==
Most experts predicted that the game would be fairly close in score and were split as to who would win, with a slight plurality favoring Tulsa.

=== Iowa State ===
Iowa State came off a .500 season (six wins, six losses) during which two quarterbacks, senior Steele Jantz and freshman Sam Richardson, started at various points. The Cyclones were coached by Paul Rhoads, who had been at Iowa State since 2009.

==== Offense ====
Freshman Sam Richardson came into the game the starter at quarterback, a role he held since the Cyclones' 53–21 win against the Kansas Jayhawks, which made them bowl eligible. Iowa State's leading rusher coming into the game was junior running back James White, who amassed 505 rushing yards during the season. One yard behind White with 504 rushing yards was Shontrelle Johnson, another junior running back. In the receiving game, Iowa State was led by a trio of senior wide receivers, Aaron Horne, Chris Young, and Josh Lenz, who totaled 39, 38, and 31 receptions respectively. Iowa State's offensive line had a few question marks coming into the game, including at right tackle where sophomore Jacob Gannon had made his first career start in the previous game. In total, Iowa State ranked 80 out of 120 in total offense averaging 364.2 yards per game.

==== Defense ====
Defensively, Iowa State was led by three players who achieved first team all-conference honors: senior defensive lineman Jake McDonough and senior linebackers Jake Knott and A. J. Klein. Knott recorded over 10 tackles in five games while Klein achieved that feat four times. Iowa State was expected to get both safety Durrell Givens and defensive back Jansen Watson back from injury for the game. The remainder of the Cyclone secondary was rounded out by senior Jeremy Reeves and junior Jacques Washington. Coming into the game, Iowa State ranked 59th in the nation in pass defense efficiency and 69th nationally in run defense.

=== Tulsa ===
Tulsa came off a 10 win, 3 loss season during which rushing was their key to success. This was the second time of the season when Tulsa was set have a rematch with a team, previously doing so with Central Florida in the conference championship game.

==== Offense ====
Tulsa's offense focused heavily upon the running game; they finished ninth in the country in rushing yards (3440) and sixth in the country in rushing touchdowns (41). Tulsa had three running backs who achieved over 700 yards rushing: junior Trey Watts (959), junior Ja'Terian Douglas (857), and senior Alex Singleton (765). Singleton also led the team and the conference and ranked sixth nationally with 21 rushing touchdowns. In the passing game, junior quarterback Cody Green totaled 2592 passing yards and 17 touchdowns, both of which were in the middle of the pack nationally. Green's leading receiver was sophomore Keyarris Garrett, who amassed 67 receptions for 845 yards and 9 touchdowns, all of which led the team.

==== Defense ====
Defensively, Tulsa ranked 17th in the nation in rushing defense (allowing 121.2 yards per game) and 34th in total defense (allowing 353.9 yards per game). They ranked second in the Football Bowl Subdivision (FBS) with 53 sacks, trailing only Stanford. Tulsa was represented by three players on the coaches' all-conference team: senior defensive end Cody Dorris, senior linebacker DeAundre Brown, and senior defensive back Dexter McCoil.

== Game summary ==
=== Broadcast ===
The 2012 Liberty Bowl was broadcast live on ESPN. Mark Jones provided the play-by-play commentary, former National Football League quarterback Brock Huard provided the color commentary, and Jessica Mendoza reported from the sideline. The game was also broadcast online via WatchESPN. Beth Mowins (play-by-play), Joey Galloway (color commentary), and Lewis Johnson (sideline reporter) broadcast the game on ESPN Radio.

=== First quarter ===
Iowa State got the ball to start the game. Their first drive was highlighted by a 26–yard pass from Sam Richardson to Josh Lenz. The drive totaled 9 plays and 56 yards and culminated with a 33–yard field goal by Edwin Arceo. Tulsa and Iowa State exchanged punts on their next two drives. When Tulsa got the ball back again, Trey Watts rushed the ball for four yards on the first play of the drive, and then Cody Green threw a short pass that was intercepted by defensive back Jeremy Reeves and returned 31 yards for a touchdown that put Iowa State up 10–0. Tulsa then put together a 9–play, 75–yard drive during which all three running backs: Alex Singleton, Ja'Terian Douglas, and Trey Watts rushed the ball. It was Singleton who rushed for a two-yard touchdown that made the score 10–7. Iowa State's next drive lasted only two plays, but the second was a 69–yard pass from Richardson to tight end Ernst Brun Jr. for a touchdown. The final two drives of the quarter both went three-and-out.

=== Second quarter ===
Tulsa had good field position after a short 31-yard punt to start their first drive of the quarter. Their 4-play, 41-yard drive culminated with an eight-yard touchdown run by Green to cut the gap to 17–14. Iowa State went three-and-out on the ensuing drive and were forced to punt. Tulsa got the ball at their own 41-yard line and put together a 6-play, 59-yard drive that featured passes to Willie Carter, Thomas Roberson, and Keyarris Garrett for 19, 21, and 6 yards respectively as well as a 12-yard rush by Watts. These plays set up first and goal at the one-yard line. Alex Singleton lost a yard on first down, but ran it in for a 2-yard touchdown on second down putting Tulsa in the lead 21–17, a lead they would not give up for the remainder of the game. The next two drives each ended in a punt. Iowa State took over at their 35-yard line with 6:10 remaining in the half. They drove down the field to the 16-yard line, but couldn't score and had to settle for a 34-yard field goal attempt by Arceo, which was blocked by Mitchell Osborne. There was no scoring for the remainder of the half.

=== Third quarter ===
Since Iowa State got the ball to start the game, Tulsa got it to start the second half. They committed an illegal block in the back penalty and therefore began the drive at their own 8-yard line. The drive went three-and-out. Iowa State ran two plays prior to Richardson being intercepted by Marco Nelson at the Tulsa 31-yard line. Tulsa began the drive by committing a 15-yard personal foul penalty which set them back to the 16. They subsequently ran nine plays that got them just short of midfield before having to punt. Cole Way's punt only went 27 yards, however, and was downed at the Iowa State 25. Iowa State punted after three plays which gave Tulsa the ball back. Their methodical 10-play, 76-yard drive was highlighted by a 48-yard run by Watts. The drive was capped by Singleton's third touchdown run of the game. Iowa State then went three-and-out once again in the final drive of the quarter. At the conclusion of the third, the score was 28–17 Tulsa.

=== Fourth quarter ===
The first drive of the fourth quarter lasted 5 plays and went 39 yards for Tulsa and was capped by a 40-yard field goal by Daniel Schwarz. Iowa State went to Steele Jantz in the fourth quarter, presumably because Richardson caught a "flu bug". Jantz completed a 15-yard pass to Brun Jr. to start his first drive in the game, but the subsequent series stalled forcing a punt, which was fair caught by Watts. Tulsa then ran a 9-play, 28-yard drive that ended in another short punt, this time 26 yards, by Way. Jantz completed two more passes on the next drive prior to throwing an interception to Dexter McCoil which set up Tulsa at their 32-yard line. They ran a 5-play, 22-yard drive, but were once again forced to punt. Iowa State's final drive of the game ended when Jantz fumbled after rushing for eight yards. The fumble was forced by Shawn Jackson and recovered at the Iowa State 28 by Brentom Todd. Tulsa then took two knees, and won the game by a score of 31–17.

=== Notes ===
As was forecast, there was rain throughout the game. Temperatures remained in the 40s. The referee for the game was Alan Eck, who officiates in the Mountain West Conference during the regular season. Ticket sales exceeded expectations, but overall attendance declined from 2011; in all, the paid attendance was 53,687.

== Scoring Summary ==
Scoring summary

Quarter	Time	Drive			Team	Scoring information	Score	
Quarter	Time	Plays	Yards	TOP	Team	Scoring information	Iowa St.	Tulsa
1	10:47	9	56	4:13	ISU	33-yard field goal by Edwin Arceo	3	0
1	7:44	-	-	-	ISU	Interception returned 31 yards for touchdown by Jeremy Reeves, Edwin Arceo kick good	10	0
1	4:47	9	75	2:57	Tulsa	Alex Singleton 2-yard touchdown run, Daniel Schwarz kick good	10	7
1	3:46	2	76	1:01	ISU	Ernst Brun Jr. 69-yard touchdown reception from Sam B. Richardson, Edwin Arceo kick good	17	7
2	14:33	4	41	0:57	Tulsa	Cody Green 8-yard touchdown run, Daniel Schwarz kick good	17	14
2	11:10	6	59	2:12	Tulsa	Alex Singleton 2-yard touchdown run, Daniel Schwarz kick good	17	21
3	1:50	10	76	5:02	Tulsa	Alex Singleton 1-yard touchdown run, Daniel Schwarz kick good	17	28
4	12:49	5	39	2:23	Tulsa	40-yard field goal by Daniel Schwarz	17	31
"TOP" = time of possession. For other American football terms, see Glossary of American football.							17	31

=== Statistics ===
Statistics	Iowa State	Tulsa
First downs	9	23
Total offense (yards)	268	410
Rushes-yards (net)	28-98	60-317
Passing yards (net)	170	93
Passes, Comp-Att-Int	14-28-2	11-23-1
Time of Possession	24:28	35:32

==== Passing stats ====
Team	Name	Completions	Attempts	Yards	Touchdowns	Interceptions
ISU	Sam Richardson	10	21	129	1	1
ISU	Steele Jantz	4	7	41	0	1
Tulsa	Cody Green	11	23	93	0	1

==== Rushing stats ====
Team	Name	Attempts	Yards	Touchdowns
ISU	Sam Richardson	10	46	0
ISU	James White	10	36	0
Tulsa	Trey Watts	25	149	0
Tulsa	Ja'Terian Douglas	8	79	0
Tulsa	Cody Green	10	58	1
Tulsa	Alex Singleton	15	35	3

==== Receiving stats ====
Team	Name	Receptions	Yards	Touchdowns
ISU	Ernst Brun Jr.	4	102	1
ISU	Josh Lenz	2	29	0
ISU	Jerome Tiller	1	16	0
ISU	Jarvis West	2	12	0
Tulsa	Thomas Roberson	2	35	0
Tulsa	Keyarris Garrett	3	19	0
Tulsa	Willie Carter	1	19	0
Tulsa	Trey Watts	4	17	0

== See also ==
- List of college football post-season games that were rematches of regular season games
