= Uzdavinis =

Uzdavinis is a surname. Notable people with the surname include:

- Arturo Uzdavinis (born 1992), American football player
- Walt Uzdavinis (1911–1988), American football player
