= Trey Watts =

American football player (born 1991)

No. 42
- Position: Running back

Personal information
- Born: February 13, 1991 (age 35); Norman, Oklahoma, U.S.
- Listed height: 5 ft 9 in (1.75 m)
- Listed weight: 180 lb (82 kg)

Career information
- High school: Oakton (Vienna, Virginia)
- College: Tulsa
- NFL draft: 2014: undrafted

Career history
- St. Louis / Los Angeles Rams (2014–2016)

Awards and highlights
- First-team All-C-USA (2013); Second-team All-C-USA (2012)

Career NFL statistics
- Rushing attempts: 7
- Rushing yards: 30
- Receptions: 3
- Receiving yards: 18
- Stats at Pro Football Reference

Julius Caesar "Trey" Watts III (born February 13, 1991) is an American former professional football player who was a running back in the National Football League (NFL). He played college football for the Tulsa Golden Hurricane and was signed by the St. Louis Rams as an undrafted free agent in 2014.

== High school ==
Watts was a four-year letterwinner and three-year starter at Oakton High School. Started at running back and played cornerback. Had career statistics of 198 carries for 1,160 yards and 21 touchdowns and also had 48 receptions for 900 yards and 11 touchdowns. Watts helped lead his team to a 13–1 record and Division 6 state semifinal appearance his senior season and was named to the Virginia High School Coaches Association and Associated Press all-state second-team as a running back and kick returner his senior season as well as being named to the Washington Post all-Met honorable mention and first-team all-league squad as a senior. Earned first-team all-district and all-region honors as a running back and kick returner and rushed for 654 yards and 14 touchdowns as a senior, while catching 39 passes for 732 yards and 10 touchdowns. Totaled 506 yards and seven touchdowns on the ground as a junior, while catching nine passes for 168 yards and one touchdown.

== Recruiting ==
Coming out of high school, Watts primary selling point was that his father, J.C. Watts, a former member of the United States House of Representatives, was previously a starting quarterback for the Oklahoma Sooners. He received no Football Bowl Subdivision scholarship offers, but thanks to a connection from his father, then Tulsa running backs coach (now head coach) Bill Blankenship convinced Watts to walk-on at Tulsa.

== College career ==
=== 2011 ===
After redshirting his true freshman season and playing sparingly his redshirt freshman season, Watts came out of spring practice poised to make a contribution to the team. He led the team in all-purpose yards finishing with 1,629 (combined rushing, receiving, and return).

=== 2012 ===
In 2012, Watts earned second-team All-Conference USA honors as a return specialist and honorable mention All-Conference USA accolades as a tailback. Watts had a particularly notable performance in the 2012 Liberty Bowl against Iowa State during which he amassed 25 carries for 149 yards. In Tulsa's previous game, the conference championship, Watts recorded a 50-yard punt return for a touchdown. In total, Watts amassed 959 rushing yards on the season which led Conference USA and averaged 29.6 yards per kickoff return which ranked eighth in the country. He rushed for three touchdowns.

=== 2013 ===
As a senior in 2013, Watts ran for 1,329 yards with 11 touchdowns.

== Professional career ==
=== St. Louis / Los Angeles Rams ===
Watts was signed as an undrafted free agent after the 2014 NFL draft by the St. Louis Rams. On October 12, 2015, Watts was released, but re-signed on October 15. Watts was suspended indefinitely by the NFL for violating the NFL's substance-abuse policy on November 4, 2015. On March 10, 2017, Watts was released from the reserve/suspended list by the Rams.

== Personal life ==
Watts is the son of J.C. Watts who was previously a member of the U.S. House of Representatives, a quarterback for the Oklahoma Sooners, and is currently a lobbyist. His mother is Frankie Watts.
