= 2012 East Carolina Pirates football team =

American college football season

2012 East Carolina Pirates football

C-USA East Division co-champion

New Orleans Bowl, L 34–43 vs. Louisiana–Lafayette
- Conference: Conference USA
- East Division
- Record: 8–5 (7–1 C-USA)
- Head coach: Ruffin McNeill (3rd season)
- Offensive coordinator: Lincoln Riley (3rd season)
- Offensive scheme: Air raid
- Defensive coordinator: Brian Mitchell (3rd season)
- Base defense: 4–3
- Home stadium: Dowdy–Ficklen Stadium

2012 Conference USA football standings
	Conf.			Overall
Team	W		L	W		L
East Division
UCF xy	7	–	1	10	–	4
East Carolina x	7	–	1	8	–	5
Marshall	4	–	4	5	–	7
Memphis	4	–	4	4	–	8
UAB	2	–	6	3	–	9
Southern Miss	0	–	8	0	–	12
West Division
Tulsa xy$	7	–	1	11	–	3
SMU	5	–	3	7	–	6
Rice	4	–	4	7	–	6
Houston	4	–	4	5	–	7
UTEP	2	–	6	3	–	9
Tulane	2	–	6	2	–	10
Championship: Tulsa 33, UCF 27
$ – Conference champion; x – Division champion/co-champions; y – Championship game participant; Rankings from AP Poll

The 2012 East Carolina Pirates football team represented East Carolina University in the 2012 NCAA Division I FBS football season. They were led by third-year head coach Ruffin McNeill and played their home games at Dowdy–Ficklen Stadium.

They were a member of the East Division of Conference USA, and tied with Central Florida and Tulsa for best conference record, at 7-1. They finished the season with an invitation to the 2013 New Orleans Bowl, where they lost to Louisiana-Lafayette to finish the season with an overall 8-5 record.

== Schedule ==
Date	Time	Opponent	Site	TV	Result	Attendance
September 1	12:00 pm	No. 6 (FCS) Appalachian State*	Dowdy–Ficklen Stadium; Greenville, NC	FSN	W 35–13	49,023
September 8	12:00 pm	at No. 9 South Carolina*	Williams-Brice Stadium; Columbia, SC	SECN/WITN	L 10–48	77,006
September 15	3:30 pm	at Southern Miss	M. M. Roberts Stadium; Hattiesburg, MS	CBSSN	W 24–14	34,140
September 22	3:30 pm	at North Carolina*	Kenan Memorial Stadium; Chapel Hill, NC	ESPNU	L 6–27	59,500
September 29	7:00 pm	UTEP	Dowdy–Ficklen Stadium; Greenville, NC	WITN	W 28–18	47,817
October 4	8:00 pm	at UCF	Bright House Networks Stadium; Orlando, FL	CBSSN	L 20–40	32,181
October 13	4:30 pm	Memphis^{†}	Dowdy–Ficklen Stadium; Greenville, NC	CSS/CSNH/WITN	W 41–7	45,137
October 20	7:00 pm	at UAB	Legion Field; Birmingham, AL	FCS	W 42–35	12,403
October 27	7:00 pm	Navy*	Dowdy–Ficklen Stadium; Greenville, NC	FSN	L 28–56	48,327
November 3	12:00 pm	Houston	Dowdy–Ficklen Stadium; Greenville, NC	FSN	W 48–28	45,455
November 17	3:30 pm	at Tulane	Mercedes-Benz Superdome; New Orleans, LA	CST/WITN	W 28–23	14,041
November 23	2:00 pm	Marshall	Dowdy–Ficklen Stadium; Greenville, NC (rivalry)	CBSSN	W 65–59 ^{2OT}	46,317
December 22	12:00 pm	vs. Louisiana–Lafayette*	Mercedes-Benz Superdome; New Orleans, LA (New Orleans Bowl)	ESPN	L 34–43	48,828
*Non-conference game; ^{†}Homecoming; Rankings from AP Poll released prior to the game; All times are in Eastern time

- Source: Schedule

== Game summaries ==
=== No. 6 (FCS) Appalachian State ===
	1	2	3	4	Total
No. 6 (FCS) Mountaineers	7	3	3	0	13
Pirates	0	14	7	14	35

Statistics	APP	ECU
First downs	20	25
Total yards	419	390
Rushing yards	119	148
Passing yards	300	242
Turnovers	3	2
Time of possession	26:42	33:18

Team	Category	Player	Statistics
Appalachian State	Passing	Jamal Jackson	23/40, 300 yards, INT
Appalachian State	Rushing	Steven Miller	14 rushes, 47 yards
Appalachian State	Receiving	Tony Washington	7 receptions, 102 yards
East Carolina	Passing	Rio Johnson	28/43, 242 yards, 2 TD, INT
East Carolina	Rushing	Michael Dobson	19 rushes, 78 yards
East Carolina	Receiving	Justin Jones	2 receptions, 45 yards

=== At No. 9 South Carolina ===
	1	2	3	4	Total
Pirates	0	0	3	7	10
No. 9 Gamecocks	14	7	14	13	48

Statistics	ECU	SC
First downs	18	25
Total yards	403	528
Rushing yards	70	131
Passing yards	333	397
Turnovers	5	1
Time of possession	31:18	28:42

Team	Category	Player	Statistics
East Carolina	Passing	Rio Johnson	18/29, 193 yards, 3 INT
East Carolina	Rushing	Vintavious Cooper	6 rushes, 31 yards
East Carolina	Receiving	Justin Hardy	8 receptions, 111 yards, TD
South Carolina	Passing	Dylan Thompson	21/37, 330 yards, 3 TD
South Carolina	Rushing	Marcus Lattimore	13 rushes, 40 yards, TD
South Carolina	Receiving	Rory Anderson	4 receptions, 90 yards, 2 TD

=== At Southern Miss ===
	1	2	3	4	Total
Pirates	0	3	21	0	24
Golden Eagles	7	0	0	7	14

Statistics	ECU	USM
First downs	13	20
Total yards	228	324
Rushing yards	57	91
Passing yards	171	233
Turnovers	0	3
Time of possession	29:53	30:07

Team	Category	Player	Statistics
East Carolina	Passing	Shane Carden	13/27, 171 yards, TD
East Carolina	Rushing	Vintavious Cooper	13 rushes, 51 yards
East Carolina	Receiving	Justin Hardy	5 receptions, 92 yards, TD
Southern Miss	Passing	Chris Campbell	11/21, 145 yards, TD
Southern Miss	Rushing	Desmond Johnson	13 rushes, 76 yards
Southern Miss	Receiving	Markese Triplett	4 receptions, 66 yards, TD

=== At North Carolina ===
	1	2	3	4	Total
Pirates	0	6	0	0	6
Tar Heels	7	3	14	3	27

Statistics	ECU	UNC
First downs	13	23
Total yards	233	450
Rushing yards	109	129
Passing yards	124	321
Turnovers	1	0
Time of possession	32:19	27:41

Team	Category	Player	Statistics
East Carolina	Passing	Shane Carden	17/30, 124 yards
East Carolina	Rushing	Vintavious Cooper	6 rushes, 68 yards
East Carolina	Receiving	Justin Jones	4 receptions, 46 yards
North Carolina	Passing	Bryn Renner	27/43, 321 yards, 2 TD
North Carolina	Rushing	Giovani Bernard	18 rushes, 50 yards, TD
North Carolina	Receiving	Erik Highsmith	8 receptions, 66 yards

=== UTEP ===
	1	2	3	4	Total
Miners	7	3	0	8	18
Pirates	7	7	7	7	28

Statistics	UTEP	ECU
First downs	17	25
Total yards	302	475
Rushing yards	151	217
Passing yards	151	258
Turnovers	4	4
Time of possession	27:02	32:58

Team	Category	Player	Statistics
UTEP	Passing	Nick Lamaison	9/27, 143 yards, TD, 3 INT
UTEP	Rushing	Nate Jeffery	27 rushes, 134 yards
UTEP	Receiving	Malcolm Trail	1 reception, 14 yards
East Carolina	Passing	Shane Carden	28/40, 258 yards, TD, 3 INT
East Carolina	Rushing	Vintavious Cooper	23 rushes, 151 yards, TD
East Carolina	Receiving	Justin Hardy	11 receptions, 95 yards, TD

=== At UCF ===
	1	2	3	4	Total
Pirates	14	3	3	0	20
Knights	7	13	10	10	40

Statistics	ECU	UCF
First downs	17	20
Total yards	362	436
Rushing yards	64	167
Passing yards	298	269
Turnovers	1	1
Time of possession	31:33	28:27

Team	Category	Player	Statistics
East Carolina	Passing	Shane Carden	23/36, 298 yards, TD, INT
East Carolina	Rushing	Vintavious Cooper	18 rushes, 58 yards
East Carolina	Receiving	Justin Hardy	5 receptions, 119 yards, TD
UCF	Passing	Blake Bortles	15/21, 269 yards, TD
UCF	Rushing	Blake Bortles	6 rushes, 62 yards, TD
UCF	Receiving	Rannell Hall	3 receptions, 68 yards

=== Memphis ===
	1	2	3	4	Total
Tigers	0	0	0	7	7
Pirates	14	3	17	7	41

Statistics	MEM	ECU
First downs	16	21
Total yards	281	369
Rushing yards	115	61
Passing yards	166	308
Turnovers	2	2
Time of possession	33:41	26:19

Team	Category	Player	Statistics
Memphis	Passing	Jacob Karam	14/23, 153 yards
Memphis	Rushing	Jai Steib	13 rushes, 38 yards, TD
Memphis	Receiving	Marcus Rucker	7 receptions, 88 yards
East Carolina	Passing	Shane Carden	25/33, 308 yards, 5 TD
East Carolina	Rushing	Vintavious Cooper	16 rushes, 96 yards
East Carolina	Receiving	Justin Hardy	6 receptions, 137 yards, 2 TD

=== At UAB ===
	1	2	3	4	Total
Pirates	7	6	14	15	42
Blazers	0	14	7	14	35

Statistics	ECU	UAB
First downs	27	19
Total yards	600	401
Rushing yards	214	82
Passing yards	386	319
Turnovers	0	0
Time of possession	32:31	27:29

Team	Category	Player	Statistics
East Carolina	Passing	Shane Carden	23/35, 386 yards, 2 TD
East Carolina	Rushing	Vintavious Cooper	26 rushes, 172 yards, 2 TD
East Carolina	Receiving	Justin Hardy	6 receptions, 132 yards, TD
UAB	Passing	Austin Brown	22/37, 319 yards, 3 TD
UAB	Rushing	Darrin Reaves	21 rushes, 69 yards, 2 TD
UAB	Receiving	Nick Adams	4 receptions, 114 yards

=== Navy ===
	1	2	3	4	Total
Midshipmen	14	7	21	14	56
Pirates	0	14	0	14	28

Statistics	NAVY	ECU
First downs	32	21
Total yards	563	338
Rushing yards	512	144
Passing yards	51	194
Turnovers	1	2
Time of possession	35:27	24:43

Team	Category	Player	Statistics
Navy	Passing	Keenan Reynolds	3/5, 51 yards, 2 TD, INT
Navy	Rushing	Gee Gee Greene	14 rushes, 131 yards
Navy	Receiving	Geoffrey Whiteside	1 reception, 20 yards, TD
East Carolina	Passing	Shane Carden	19/29, 194 yards, TD, INT
East Carolina	Rushing	Vintavious Cooper	18 rushes, 121 yards, TD
East Carolina	Receiving	Danny Webster	3 receptions, 44 yards

=== Houston ===
	1	2	3	4	Total
Cougars	0	7	7	14	28
Pirates	14	14	3	17	48

Statistics	HOU	ECU
First downs	16	31
Total yards	369	550
Rushing yards	28	245
Passing yards	341	305
Turnovers	2	2
Time of possession	15:52	44:08

Team	Category	Player	Statistics
Houston	Passing	David Piland	22/51, 341 yards, 4 TD, INT
Houston	Rushing	Charles Sims	5 rushes, 33 yards
Houston	Receiving	Isaiah Sweeney	3 receptions, 93 yards, TD
East Carolina	Passing	Shane Carden	31/43, 305 yards, 4 TD, INT
East Carolina	Rushing	Vintavious Cooper	33 rushes, 140 yards, TD
East Carolina	Receiving	Derrick Harris	3 receptions, 65 yards

=== At Tulane ===
	1	2	3	4	Total
Pirates	0	14	7	7	28
Green Wave	7	6	3	7	23

Statistics	ECU	TULN
First downs	20	22
Total yards	387	302
Rushing yards	172	9
Passing yards	215	293
Turnovers	2	0
Time of possession	27:49	32:11

Team	Category	Player	Statistics
East Carolina	Passing	Shane Carden	19/33, 215 yards, 2 TD, 2 INT
East Carolina	Rushing	Vintavious Cooper	15 rushes, 87 yards
East Carolina	Receiving	Justin Hardy	5 receptions, 55 yards, TD
Tulane	Passing	Ryan Griffin	36/57, 293 yards, 2 TD
Tulane	Rushing	Dante Butler	2 rushes, 18 yards
Tulane	Receiving	Ryan Grant	10 receptions, 94 yards

=== Marshall ===
	1	2	3	4	OT	2OT	Total
Thundering Herd	7	21	7	17	7	0	59
Pirates	14	21	7	10	7	6	65

Statistics	MRSH	ECU
First downs	36	31
Total yards	633	555
Rushing yards	214	116
Passing yards	419	439
Turnovers	3	0
Time of possession	28:40	31:20

Team	Category	Player	Statistics
Marshall	Passing	Rakeem Cato	31/40, 318 yards, 5 TD, INT
Marshall	Rushing	Essray Taliaferro	27 rushes, 130 yards, TD
Marshall	Receiving	Tommy Shuler	14 receptions, 141 yards, 2 TD
East Carolina	Passing	Shane Carden	38/47, 439 yards, 3 TD
East Carolina	Rushing	Vintavious Cooper	14 rushes, 52 yards, 2 TD
East Carolina	Receiving	Justin Hardy	16 receptions, 171 yards

=== Vs. Louisiana–Lafayette (New Orleans Bowl) ===
	1	2	3	4	Total
Pirates	0	21	10	3	34
Ragin' Cajuns	7	24	6	6	43

Statistics	ECU	ULL
First downs	24	25
Total yards	421	591
Rushing yards	143	267
Passing yards	278	324
Turnovers	1	2
Time of possession	27:17	32:43

Team	Category	Player	Statistics
East Carolina	Passing	Shane Carden	25/42, 278 yards, 2 TD, INT
East Carolina	Rushing	Reggie Bullock	17 rushes, 104 yards, 2 TD
East Carolina	Receiving	Andrew Bodenheimer	5 receptions, 65 yards
Louisiana–Lafayette	Passing	Terrance Broadway	21/32, 316 yards, TD, INT
Louisiana–Lafayette	Rushing	Alonzo Harris	21 rushes, 120 yards, 2 TD
Louisiana–Lafayette	Receiving	Jamal Robinson	6 receptions, 116 yards
