= 2012 Conference USA Football Championship Game =

- Conference Championship
UCF Knights	Tulsa Golden Hurricane
(9–3)	(9–3)
27	33
Head coach: George O'Leary	Head coach: Bill Blankenship
	1	2	3	4	OT	Total
UCF	0	14	13	0	0	27
Tulsa	7	14	0	6	6	33
- Date: December 1, 2012
- Season: 2012
- Stadium: Skelly Field at H. A. Chapman Stadium
- Location: Tulsa, OK
- MVP: Trey Watts (RB/RS, Tulsa)
- Favorite: Tulsa by 2.5
- Referee: Ed Ardito
- Attendance: 17,635

United States TV coverage
- Network: ESPN2
- Announcers: Dave Pasch, Brian Griese and Jenn Brown

2012 Conference USA football standings
	Conf.			Overall
Team	W		L	W		L
East Division
UCF xy	7	–	1	10	–	4
East Carolina x	7	–	1	8	–	5
Marshall	4	–	4	5	–	7
Memphis	4	–	4	4	–	8
UAB	2	–	6	3	–	9
Southern Miss	0	–	8	0	–	12
West Division
Tulsa xy$	7	–	1	11	–	3
SMU	5	–	3	7	–	6
Rice	4	–	4	7	–	6
Houston	4	–	4	5	–	7
UTEP	2	–	6	3	–	9
Tulane	2	–	6	2	–	10
Championship: Tulsa 33, UCF 27
$ – Conference champion; x – Division champion/co-champions; y – Championship game participant; Rankings from AP Poll

The 2012 Conference USA Football Championship Game was played on December 1, 2012 between the Tulsa Golden Hurricane, winners of the Conference USA West division and the UCF Knights, the winners of the East division.

It was the third match-up between the Golden Hurricane and Knights in the C-USA Championship Game and the first in Tulsa. The two teams previously met in 2005 and 2007, which were both played in Orlando.

== Game summary ==
Under conference rules, the game was held at the home field of the team with the best record in conference play; since both teams finished C-USA play at 7–1, but Tulsa defeated UCF in their head-to-head match-up two weeks earlier, the game was held at the Golden Hurricane's home field, Skelly Field at H. A. Chapman Stadium in Tulsa, Oklahoma.

The game marked UCF's last conference match-up as a member of Conference USA, as the Knights moved to the American Athletic Conference for the 2013 season.

== Scoring summary ==
Quarter	Time	Drive		Team	Scoring Information	Score	
Quarter	Time	Length	Time	Team	Scoring Information	UCF	Tulsa
1	09:28	5 plays, 38 yards	1:52	Tulsa	Thomas Roberson 20–yard reception from Cody Green, Daniel Schwarz kick good	0	7
2	14:13	10 plays, 73 yards	5:07	UCF	Breshad Perriman 8–yard reception from Blake Bortles, Shawn Moffit kick good	7	7
2	04:53	9 plays, 52 yards	4:18	UCF	Quincy McDuffie 8–yard reception from Blake Bortles, Shawn Moffit kick good	14	7
2	02:35	7 plays, 75 yards	2:18	Tulsa	Alex Singleton 22–yard rush, Daniel Schwarz kick good	14	14
2	00:00	8 plays, 80 yards	1:02	Tulsa	Ja'Terian Douglas 2–yard rush, Daniel Schwarz kick good	14	21
3	04:23	5 plays, 27 yards	2:04	UCF	Latavius Murray 2–yard rush, Shawn Moffit kick blocked	20	21
3	02:19	6 plays, 59 yards	1:22	UCF	Blake Bortles 28–yard rush, Shawn Moffit kick good	27	21
4	05:06	1 plays, 54 yards	0:08	Tulsa	Trey Watts 54–yard punt return, Daniel Schwarz kick blocked	27	27
OT	–	–	–	Tulsa	Alex Singleton 1–yard rush	27	33
Final Score						27	33
