= Garrick McGee =

American football player and coach (born 1973)

Current position
- Title: Wide receivers coach
- Team: North Carolina
- Conference: ACC

Biographical details
- Born: April 6, 1973 (age 53); Tulsa, Oklahoma, U.S.

Playing career
- 1991–1992: Arizona State
- 1993: Northeastern Oklahoma A&M
- 1994–1995: Oklahoma
- Position: Quarterback

Coaching career (HC unless noted)
- 1996–1998: Langston (assistant)
- 1999: Northern Iowa (WR)
- 2000–2001: Jacksonville Jaguars (QC)
- 2002: Toledo (WR)
- 2003: UNLV (WR)
- 2004–2005: Northwestern (WR)
- 2006–2007: Northwestern (OC/QB)
- 2008–2009: Arkansas (QB)
- 2010–2011: Arkansas (OC/QB)
- 2012–2013: UAB
- 2014–2015: Louisville (AHC/OC/QB)
- 2016–2017: Illinois (OC/QB)
- 2018: Missouri (analyst)
- 2019: Missouri (WR)
- 2020: Florida (analyst)
- 2021: Florida (QB)
- 2022: Purdue (WR)
- 2023–2024: Louisville (WR)
- 2025–present: North Carolina (WR)

Head coaching record
- Overall: 5–19

Garrick Ladell McGee (born April 6, 1973) is an American football coach and former player. He is the wide receivers coach at North Carolina. He was previously the quarterbacks coach at the University of Florida. McGee was the head football coach at the University of Alabama at Birmingham (UAB) from 2012 to 2013. He has served as the offensive coordinator at Northwestern University, the University of Arkansas, the University of Louisville, and the University of Illinois. McGee played college football as a quarterback at Arizona State University, Northeastern Oklahoma A&M College, and the University of Oklahoma.

== Early life ==
McGee was born in Tulsa, Oklahoma and graduated from Tulsa's Booker T. Washington High School. He went on to play as a quarterback at Arizona State University, Northeastern Oklahoma A&M College, and the University of Oklahoma.

== Coaching career ==
=== Arkansas ===
McGee was named the offensive coordinator and quarterbacks coach of the Razorbacks prior to the 2010 season and helped lead them to a 10–3 record and an appearance in the 2011 Sugar Bowl. Arkansas' offense finished 8th in the nation, averaging 489 yards per game. The Razorbacks were also fourth in passing offense and 14th in scoring offense (37.3 ppg).

On January 13, 2011, media outlets reported that McGee was offered the job to take over the University of Tulsa's Golden Hurricane football team from the departing Todd Graham, who left the head coaching position to take over the program at the University of Pittsburgh. McGee withdrew his name from the search the following day.

=== UAB ===
On December 3, 2011, numerous media outlets reported McGee would become the next coach of the UAB Blazers and fourth head coach in school history, replacing Neil Callaway. On December 4, 2011, UAB officials officially announced they hired McGee as head coach. McGee was officially introduced as the new head coach at a press conference on December 5, 2011. McGee's two-year tenure at UAB was not successful, as the Blazers compiled a 5–19 record over that span, culminating with a 62–27 defeat by the Southern Miss Golden Eagles, which had lost 23 games in a row prior.

=== Louisville ===
On January 9, 2014, McGee accepted the position of offensive coordinator at Louisville.

=== Illinois ===
March 9, 2016, McGee left Louisville, accepting the University of Illinois' offer for the same position. On December 23, 2017, he was fired by Illinois.

== Head coaching record ==
Year	Team	Overall	Conference	Standing	Bowl/playoffs
UAB Blazers (Conference USA) (2012–2013)
2012	UAB	3–9	2–6	5th (East)	
2013	UAB	2–10	1–7	T–5th (East)	
UAB:		5–19	3–13		
Total:		5–19			
