= 2012 Southern Miss Golden Eagles football team =

American college football season

2012 Southern Miss Golden Eagles football
- Conference: Conference USA
- East Division
- Record: 0–12 (0–8 C-USA)
- Head coach: Ellis Johnson (1st season)
- Offensive coordinator: Steve Buckley (1st season)
- Offensive scheme: Multiple
- Defensive coordinator: Tommy West (1st season)
- Base defense: 4–2–5
- Home stadium: M. M. Roberts Stadium

2012 Conference USA football standings
| | Conf. | | | Overall |
| Team | W | | L | W | | L |
|---|---|---|---|---|---|---|
East Division
| UCF xy | 7 | – | 1 | 10 | – | 4 |
| East Carolina x | 7 | – | 1 | 8 | – | 5 |
| Marshall | 4 | – | 4 | 5 | – | 7 |
| Memphis | 4 | – | 4 | 4 | – | 8 |
| UAB | 2 | – | 6 | 3 | – | 9 |
| Southern Miss | 0 | – | 8 | 0 | – | 12 |
West Division
| Tulsa xy$ | 7 | – | 1 | 11 | – | 3 |
| SMU | 5 | – | 3 | 7 | – | 6 |
| Rice | 4 | – | 4 | 7 | – | 6 |
| Houston | 4 | – | 4 | 5 | – | 7 |
| UTEP | 2 | – | 6 | 3 | – | 9 |
| Tulane | 2 | – | 6 | 2 | – | 10 |
Championship: Tulsa 33, UCF 27
$ – Conference champion; x – Division champion/co-champions; y – Championship game participant; Rankings from AP Poll

The 2012 Southern Miss Golden Eagles football team represented the University of Southern Mississippi in the 2012 NCAA Division I FBS football season as a member of the East Division of Conference USA. They were led by first-year head coach Ellis Johnson and played their home games at M. M. Roberts Stadium in Hattiesburg, Mississippi. The 2012 squad finished the season winless with a final record of 0–12 one year after finishing 12–2 and winning the conference championship. The biggest single season decline in FBS history, and after only one year at the helm, Johnson along with his entire staff were fired.

== Schedule ==
| Date | Time | Opponent | Site | TV | Result | Attendance |
|---|---|---|---|---|---|---|
| September 1 | 2:30 pm | at No. 17 Nebraska* | Memorial Stadium; Lincoln, Nebraska | ABC | L 20–49 | 85,425 |
| September 15 | 2:30 pm | East Carolina | M. M. Roberts Stadium; Hattiesburg, Mississippi | CBSSN | L 14–24 | 34,140 |
| September 22 | 6:00 pm | at Western Kentucky* | Houchens Industries–L. T. Smith Stadium; Bowling Green, Kentucky | ESPN3 | L 17–42 | 23,252 |
| September 29 | 7:00 pm | No. 19 Louisville* | M. M. Roberts Stadium; Hattiesburg, Mississippi | CBSSN | L 17–21 | 23,492 |
| October 6 | 11:00 am | Boise State* | M. M. Roberts Stadium; Hattiesburg, Mississippi | FSN | L 14–40 | 25,337 |
| October 13 | 7:00 pm | at UCF | Bright House Networks Stadium; Orlando, Florida | CBSSN | L 31–38 ^{2OT} | 34,514 |
| October 20 | 6:00 pm | Marshall^{†} | M. M. Roberts Stadium; Hattiesburg, Mississippi | CBSSN | L 24–59 | 24,093 |
| October 27 | 12:00 pm | at Rice | Rice Stadium; Houston, Texas | CSS/CSNH | L 17–44 | 14,927 |
| November 3 | 6:30 pm | UAB | M. M. Roberts Stadium; Hattiesburg, Mississippi | CSS/CSNH | L 19–27 | 22,874 |
| November 10 | 2:30 pm | at SMU | Gerald J. Ford Stadium; University Park, Texas | FSN | L 6–34 | 16,343 |
| November 17 | 7:00 pm | UTEP | M. M. Roberts Stadium; Hattiesburg, Mississippi | CBSSN | L 33–34 | 23,757 |
| November 24 | 2:30 pm | at Memphis | Liberty Bowl Memorial Stadium; Memphis, Tennessee (Black and Blue Bowl) | CSS/CSNH | L 24–42 | 21,305 |
*Non-conference game; ^{†}Homecoming; Rankings from AP Poll released prior to the game; All times are in Central time

== Personnel ==
2012 Southern Miss Golden Eagles football team roster
Players
Coaches
Offense

| Pos. | # | Name | Class |
|---|---|---|---|
| WR | 1 | Tracy Lampley | Sr |
| QB | 2 | Anthony Alford | Fr |
| RB | 3 | Tyre Bracken | Fr |
| WR | 5 | D. J. Thompson | Fr |
| QB | 6 | Arsenio Favor | So |
| RB | 7 | Desmond Johnson | Sr |
| QB | 7 | Kyle Sloter | Fr |
| QB | 8 | Ricky Lloyd | Fr |
| WR | 9 | Chris Briggs | So |
| QB | 11 | Cole Weeks | So |
| WR | 12 | Jarell Aaron | Fr |
| QB | 13 | Chris Campbell | Jr |
| TE | 17 | Stanley Tart | Fr |
| WR | 18 | Dominique Sullivan | Jr |
| RB | 21 | Jeremy Hester | Jr |
| WR | 23 | Markese Triplett | Jr |
| WR | 24 | Dimitri Smith | Jr |
| WR | 25 | Justin Sims | Jr |
| RB | 29 | Kendrick Hardy | Jr |
| RB | 30 | Jalen Richard | Fr |
| FB | 36 | Bruce Johnson | Jr |
| OL | 51 | Darius Barnes | Sr |
| OL | 52 | Jason Weaver | Sr |
| OL | 57 | Garrett Clark | Fr |
| OL | 60 | Chaz Cavignac | Fr |
| OL | 60 | Brandon Farmer | Fr |
| OL | 61 | Bradley Nugent | Fr |
| OL | 62 | Austin Quattrochi | Sr |
| OL | 66 | Jordan Greene | Fr |
| OL | 67 | Dyron White | Sr |
| OL | 68 | Joe Duhan | Sr |
| OL | 70 | Vincent Brown | Jr |
| OL | 71 | Randal Agee | Fr |
| OL | 73 | Rashod Hall | Fr |
| OL | 74 | Cedric Chisolm | So |
| OL | 75 | Oliver Bates | Fr |
| OL | 76 | Michael Brinson | Fr |
| OL | 77 | Ed Preston | Jr |
| OL | 78 | Jonathan Guerry | Jr |
| OL | 79 | Taylor Peterson | So |
| TE | 80 | Collin Jarbo | So |
| TE | 81 | Ryan Hanks | Sr |
| WR | 82 | Justin Burdette | Fr |
| WR | 83 | Cooper Harrington | Fr |
| TE | 84 | Max Mason | Fr |
| WR | 85 | Quentin Pierce | Sr |
| WR | 87 | Francisco Llanos | Jr |

Defense

| Pos. | # | Name | Class |
|---|---|---|---|
| DB | 2 | Martez Thompson | Sr |
| DB | 3 | Antonio Thomas Jr. | Fr |
| DB | 5 | Jerrion Johnson | Jr |
| DL | 8 | Jamie Collins | Sr |
| DB | 11 | Kalan Reed | Fr |
| DB | 12 | Emmanuel Johnson | So |
| DB | 13 | Reggie Hunt | Sr |
| LB | 14 | Terrick Wright | Fr |
| DB | 15 | Marcal Robinson | Sr |
| DB | 16 | Alex Smith | Jr |
| DB | 17 | David Bertucci | Fr |
| DL | 18 | Brandon Francesconi | Sr |
| DB | 19 | Clifford Johnson | Sr |
| DB | 20 | Ed Wilkins | Fr |
| DB | 21 | Marcus Turner | Fr |
| DB | 22 | Deron Wilson | Jr |
| DB | 23 | DeBarrious Miller | Fr |
| LB | 24 | Chauncey Smith | Fr |
| DB | 28 | Jacorius Cotton | Jr |
| DB | 31 | Alexander Walters | Jr |
| LB | 35 | Justin Penn | So |
| LB | 37 | Alan Howze | Jr |
| LB | 38 | Jerry McCorvey | Fr |
| LB | 42 | Ta'Dren Kennedy | So |
| DL | 45 | Dasman McCullum | So |
| DL | 46 | Will Freeman | Fr |
| DL | 47 | Nic Bekkers | So |
| DL | 49 | Adam Williams | Jr |
| LB | 53 | Jamil Murray | Fr |
| LB | 54 | Lelland Ducksworth | Fr |
| LB | 55 | Dylan Reda | Jr |
| DL | 89 | Joel Ross | Sr |
| DL | 91 | Michael Smith | Fr |
| DL | 92 | Casey D'Angelo | So |
| DL | 93 | Dalvin Craft | Fr |
| DL | 94 | Anthony Wilson | Jr |
| DL | 95 | Khalid Wilson | Sr |
| DL | 96 | Roderick Henderson | Fr |
| DL | 97 | Rakeem Nunez-Roches | So |
| DL | 98 | Khyri Thornton | Jr |
| DL | 99 | Octavius Thomas | Jr |

Special teams

| Pos. | # | Name | Class |
|---|---|---|---|
| P, K | 25 | Corey Acosta | So |
| P | 30 | Matthew Moseley | So |
| P | 39 | Peter Boehme | Sr |
| LS | 50 | Lance Schuffert | Fr |

Head coach

- Ellis Johnson

Coordinators/assistant coaches

- Steve Buckley
  Assistant head coach/offensive coordinator/quarterbacks
- Tommy West
  Defensive coordinator/linebackers
- Rickey Bustle
  Running backs
- Lorenzo Costantini
  Defensive line
- Maurice Drayton
  Secondary
- Broderick Fobbs
  Wide receivers
- Tucker Peavey
  Offensive line

Legend

- (C) Team captain
- (S) Suspended
- (I) Ineligible
- Injured
- Redshirt

Roster
Last update: June 29, 2025

== Game summaries ==
=== At No. 17 Nebraska ===
| | 1 | 2 | 3 | 4 | Total |
|---|---|---|---|---|---|
| Golden Eagles | 7 | 10 | 0 | 3 | 20 |
| No. 17 Cornhuskers | 14 | 14 | 14 | 7 | 49 |

| Statistics | USM | NEB |
|---|---|---|
| First downs | 20 | 33 |
| Total yards | 260 | 632 |
| Rushing yards | 185 | 278 |
| Passing yards | 75 | 354 |
| Turnovers | 1 | 0 |
| Time of possession | 28:22 | 31:38 |

| Team | Category | Player | Statistics |
|---|---|---|---|
| Southern Miss | Passing | Chris Campbell | 6/11, 69 yards, TD |
| Southern Miss | Rushing | Anthony Alford | 15 rushes, 84 yards |
| Southern Miss | Receiving | Tracy Lampley | 2 receptions, 27 yards |
| Nebraska | Passing | Taylor Martinez | 26/34, 354 yards, 5 TD |
| Nebraska | Rushing | Ameer Abdullah | 15 rushes, 81 yards |
| Nebraska | Receiving | Quincy Enunwa | 6 receptions, 70 yards |

=== East Carolina ===
| | 1 | 2 | 3 | 4 | Total |
|---|---|---|---|---|---|
| Pirates | 0 | 3 | 21 | 0 | 24 |
| Golden Eagles | 7 | 0 | 0 | 7 | 14 |

| Statistics | ECU | USM |
|---|---|---|
| First downs | 13 | 20 |
| Total yards | 228 | 324 |
| Rushing yards | 57 | 91 |
| Passing yards | 171 | 233 |
| Turnovers | 0 | 3 |
| Time of possession | 30:07 | 29:53 |

| Team | Category | Player | Statistics |
|---|---|---|---|
| East Carolina | Passing | Shane Carden | 13/27, 171 yards, TD |
| East Carolina | Rushing | Vintavious Cooper | 13 rushes, 51 yards |
| East Carolina | Receiving | Justin Hardy | 5 receptions, 92 yards, TD |
| Southern Miss | Passing | Chris Campbell | 11/21, 145 yards, TD |
| Southern Miss | Rushing | Desmond Johnson | 13 rushes, 76 yards |
| Southern Miss | Receiving | Markese Triplett | 4 receptions, 66 yards, TD |

=== At Western Kentucky ===
| | 1 | 2 | 3 | 4 | Total |
|---|---|---|---|---|---|
| Golden Eagles | 0 | 3 | 7 | 7 | 17 |
| Hilltoppers | 14 | 7 | 21 | 0 | 42 |

| Statistics | USM | WKU |
|---|---|---|
| First downs | 16 | 25 |
| Total yards | 264 | 560 |
| Rushing yards | 163 | 369 |
| Passing yards | 101 | 191 |
| Turnovers | 1 | 1 |
| Time of possession | 24:18 | 35:42 |

| Team | Category | Player | Statistics |
|---|---|---|---|
| Southern Miss | Passing | Ricky Lloyd | 4/5, 72 yards, TD |
| Southern Miss | Rushing | Desmond Johnson | 10 rushes, 39 yards |
| Southern Miss | Receiving | Dominique Sullivan | 1 reception, 46 yards |
| Western Kentucky | Passing | Kawaun Jakes | 12/18, 172 yards, 3 TD |
| Western Kentucky | Rushing | Antonio Andrews | 15 rushes, 136 yards, TD |
| Western Kentucky | Receiving | Antonio Andrews | 4 receptions, 74 yards, TD |

=== No. 19 Louisville ===
| | 1 | 2 | 3 | 4 | Total |
|---|---|---|---|---|---|
| No. 19 Cardinals | 6 | 6 | 3 | 6 | 21 |
| Golden Eagles | 10 | 7 | 0 | 0 | 17 |

| Statistics | LOU | USM |
|---|---|---|
| First downs | 17 | 13 |
| Total yards | 269 | 249 |
| Rushing yards | 184 | 224 |
| Passing yards | 85 | 25 |
| Turnovers | 2 | 1 |
| Time of possession | 35:22 | 24:38 |

| Team | Category | Player | Statistics |
|---|---|---|---|
| Louisville | Passing | Teddy Bridgewater | 9/13, 85 yards, TD, INT |
| Louisville | Rushing | Senorise Perry | 22 rushes, 118 yards, 2 TD |
| Louisville | Receiving | DeVante Parker | 2 receptions, 37 yards, TD |
| Southern Miss | Passing | Ricky Lloyd | 2/8, 25 yards |
| Southern Miss | Rushing | Desmond Johnson | 14 rushes, 94 yards |
| Southern Miss | Receiving | Jalen Richard | 1 reception, 13 yards |

=== Boise State ===
| | 1 | 2 | 3 | 4 | Total |
|---|---|---|---|---|---|
| Broncos | 7 | 16 | 7 | 10 | 40 |
| Golden Eagles | 0 | 0 | 7 | 7 | 14 |

| Statistics | BSU | USM |
|---|---|---|
| First downs | 18 | 21 |
| Total yards | 310 | 424 |
| Rushing yards | 109 | 181 |
| Passing yards | 201 | 243 |
| Turnovers | 1 | 5 |
| Time of possession | 29:25 | 30:35 |

| Team | Category | Player | Statistics |
|---|---|---|---|
| Boise State | Passing | Joe Southwick | 18/27, 195 yards, 3 TD, INT |
| Boise State | Rushing | D. J. Harper | 13 rushes, 47 yards, 2 TD |
| Boise State | Receiving | Kirby Moore | 5 receptions, 61 yards, TD |
| Southern Miss | Passing | Ricky Lloyd | 12/21, 143 yards, 2 INT |
| Southern Miss | Rushing | Desmond Johnson | 15 rushes, 116 yards, TD |
| Southern Miss | Receiving | Dominique Sullivan | 7 receptions, 63 yards |

=== At UCF ===
| | 1 | 2 | 3 | 4 | OT | 2OT | Total |
|---|---|---|---|---|---|---|---|
| Golden Eagles | 0 | 7 | 7 | 10 | 7 | 0 | 31 |
| Knights | 7 | 10 | 0 | 7 | 7 | 7 | 38 |

| Statistics | USM | UCF |
|---|---|---|
| First downs | 20 | 25 |
| Total yards | 359 | 454 |
| Rushing yards | 194 | 182 |
| Passing yards | 165 | 272 |
| Turnovers | 2 | 0 |
| Time of possession | 25:41 | 34:19 |

| Team | Category | Player | Statistics |
|---|---|---|---|
| Southern Miss | Passing | Anthony Alford | 14/27, 165 yards, 2 INT |
| Southern Miss | Rushing | Jalen Richard | 13 rushes, 87 yards, 2 TD |
| Southern Miss | Receiving | Francisco Llanos | 4 receptions, 63 yards |
| UCF | Passing | Blake Bortles | 27/40, 272 yards |
| UCF | Rushing | Storm Johnson | 18 rushes, 94 yards, TD |
| UCF | Receiving | J. J. Worton | 8 receptions, 117 yards |

=== Marshall ===
| | 1 | 2 | 3 | 4 | Total |
|---|---|---|---|---|---|
| Thundering Herd | 10 | 21 | 14 | 14 | 59 |
| Golden Eagles | 3 | 14 | 0 | 7 | 24 |

| Statistics | MRSH | USM |
|---|---|---|
| First downs | 32 | 25 |
| Total yards | 629 | 331 |
| Rushing yards | 275 | 216 |
| Passing yards | 354 | 115 |
| Turnovers | 1 | 3 |
| Time of possession | 29:37 | 30:23 |

| Team | Category | Player | Statistics |
|---|---|---|---|
| Marshall | Passing | Rakeem Cato | 31/42, 340 yards, 3 TD, INT |
| Marshall | Rushing | Kevin Grooms | 12 rushes, 119 yards, 2 TD |
| Marshall | Receiving | Tommy Shuler | 11 receptions, 111 yards, 2 TD |
| Southern Miss | Passing | Anthony Alford | 9/21, 65 yards |
| Southern Miss | Rushing | Kendrick Hardy | 8 rushes, 50 yards |
| Southern Miss | Receiving | Quentin Pierce | 2 receptions, 39 yards |

=== At Rice ===
| | 1 | 2 | 3 | 4 | Total |
|---|---|---|---|---|---|
| Golden Eagles | 3 | 7 | 7 | 0 | 17 |
| Owls | 7 | 14 | 17 | 6 | 44 |

| Statistics | USM | RICE |
|---|---|---|
| First downs | 19 | 19 |
| Total yards | 372 | 370 |
| Rushing yards | 116 | 198 |
| Passing yards | 256 | 172 |
| Turnovers | 5 | 3 |
| Time of possession | 31:47 | 28:13 |

| Team | Category | Player | Statistics |
|---|---|---|---|
| Southern Miss | Passing | Arsenio Favor | 10/22, 180 yards, 2 INT |
| Southern Miss | Rushing | Arsenio Favor | 19 rushes, 65 yards, TD |
| Southern Miss | Receiving | Tracy Lampley | 4 receptions, 101 yards |
| Rice | Passing | Driphus Jackson | 4/6, 92 yards, 2 TD |
| Rice | Rushing | Turner Petersen | 19 rushes, 136 yards, TD |
| Rice | Receiving | Turner Petersen | 1 reception, 38 yards, TD |

=== UAB ===
| | 1 | 2 | 3 | 4 | Total |
|---|---|---|---|---|---|
| Blazers | 0 | 0 | 14 | 13 | 27 |
| Golden Eagles | 0 | 16 | 3 | 0 | 19 |

| Statistics | UAB | USM |
|---|---|---|
| First downs | 25 | 16 |
| Total yards | 435 | 295 |
| Rushing yards | 207 | 183 |
| Passing yards | 228 | 112 |
| Turnovers | 3 | 3 |
| Time of possession | 33:37 | 26:23 |

| Team | Category | Player | Statistics |
|---|---|---|---|
| UAB | Passing | Austin Brown | 17/29, 203 yards, TD, INT |
| UAB | Rushing | Darrin Reaves | 35 rushes, 223 yards, 2 TD |
| UAB | Receiving | Jackie Williams | 4 receptions, 57 yards |
| Southern Miss | Passing | Anthony Alford | 10/26, 112 yards, INT |
| Southern Miss | Rushing | Jalen Richard | 9 rushes, 82 yards, TD |
| Southern Miss | Receiving | Justin Sims | 1 reception, 56 yards |

=== At SMU ===
| | 1 | 2 | 3 | 4 | Total |
|---|---|---|---|---|---|
| Golden Eagles | 0 | 6 | 0 | 0 | 6 |
| Mustangs | 10 | 17 | 0 | 7 | 34 |

| Statistics | USM | SMU |
|---|---|---|
| First downs | 10 | 20 |
| Total yards | 178 | 435 |
| Rushing yards | 51 | 186 |
| Passing yards | 127 | 249 |
| Turnovers | 2 | 0 |
| Time of possession | 23:14 | 36:46 |

| Team | Category | Player | Statistics |
|---|---|---|---|
| Southern Miss | Passing | Chris Campbell | 8/18, 93 yards, TD, 2 INT |
| Southern Miss | Rushing | Jalen Richard | 10 rushes, 40 yards |
| Southern Miss | Receiving | Chris Briggs | 4 receptions, 33 yards |
| SMU | Passing | Garrett Gilbert | 27/43, 249 yards, TD |
| SMU | Rushing | Garrett Gilbert | 5 rushes, 94 yards, 2 TD |
| SMU | Receiving | Jeremy Johnson | 8 receptions, 97 yards |

=== UTEP ===
| | 1 | 2 | 3 | 4 | Total |
|---|---|---|---|---|---|
| Miners | 3 | 17 | 0 | 14 | 34 |
| Golden Eagles | 10 | 7 | 3 | 13 | 33 |

| Statistics | UTEP | USM |
|---|---|---|
| First downs | 16 | 19 |
| Total yards | 359 | 532 |
| Rushing yards | 170 | 158 |
| Passing yards | 189 | 374 |
| Turnovers | 0 | 1 |
| Time of possession | 30:13 | 29:47 |

| Team | Category | Player | Statistics |
|---|---|---|---|
| UTEP | Passing | Blaire Sullivan | 9/17, 155 yards |
| UTEP | Rushing | Blaire Sullivan | 19 rushes, 98 yards, TD |
| UTEP | Receiving | Jordan Leslie | 2 receptions, 41 yards |
| Southern Miss | Passing | Arsenio Favor | 16/22, 374 yards, 2 TD, INT |
| Southern Miss | Rushing | Desmond Johnson | 16 rushes, 59 yards, TD |
| Southern Miss | Receiving | Quentin Pierce | 2 receptions, 125 yards, TD |

=== At Memphis ===
| | 1 | 2 | 3 | 4 | Total |
|---|---|---|---|---|---|
| Golden Eagles | 3 | 7 | 0 | 14 | 24 |
| Tigers | 0 | 21 | 21 | 0 | 42 |

| Statistics | USM | MEM |
|---|---|---|
| First downs | 16 | 23 |
| Total yards | 288 | 437 |
| Rushing yards | 95 | 275 |
| Passing yards | 193 | 162 |
| Turnovers | 1 | 1 |
| Time of possession | 27:38 | 32:22 |

| Team | Category | Player | Statistics |
|---|---|---|---|
| Southern Miss | Passing | Anthony Alford | 6/9, 110 yards, 2 TD |
| Southern Miss | Rushing | Jalen Richard | 12 rushes, 43 yards |
| Southern Miss | Receiving | Tyre Bracken | 3 receptions, 67 yards, TD |
| Memphis | Passing | Jacob Karam | 12/18, 162 yards, 2 TD |
| Memphis | Rushing | Brandon Hayes | 19 rushes, 115 yards, 2 TD |
| Memphis | Receiving | Tevin Jones | 4 receptions, 88 yards |
