= 2012 Memphis Tigers football team =

American college football season

2012 Memphis Tigers football
- Conference: Conference USA
- East Division
- Record: 4–8 (4–4 C-USA)
- Head coach: Justin Fuente (1st season)
- Offensive coordinator: Darrell Dickey (1st season)
- Offensive scheme: Pro-style
- Defensive coordinator: Barry Odom (1st season)
- Base defense: 4–3
- Home stadium: Liberty Bowl Memorial Stadium

2012 Conference USA football standings
	Conf.			Overall
Team	W		L	W		L
East Division
UCF xy	7	–	1	10	–	4
East Carolina x	7	–	1	8	–	5
Marshall	4	–	4	5	–	7
Memphis	4	–	4	4	–	8
UAB	2	–	6	3	–	9
Southern Miss	0	–	8	0	–	12
West Division
Tulsa xy$	7	–	1	11	–	3
SMU	5	–	3	7	–	6
Rice	4	–	4	7	–	6
Houston	4	–	4	5	–	7
UTEP	2	–	6	3	–	9
Tulane	2	–	6	2	–	10
Championship: Tulsa 33, UCF 27
$ – Conference champion; x – Division champion/co-champions; y – Championship game participant; Rankings from AP Poll

The 2012 Memphis Tigers football team represented the University of Memphis in the 2012 NCAA Division I FBS football season. The Tigers were led by first year head coach Justin Fuente and played their home games at the Liberty Bowl Memorial Stadium in Memphis, Tennessee. They played in their final season as a member East Division of Conference USA in 2012 and moved to the Big East Conference in 2013. They finished the season 4–8, 4–4 in C-USA play to finish in a tie for third place in the East Division.

== Schedule ==
Date	Time	Opponent	Site	TV	Result	Attendance
September 1	6:00 p.m.	Tennessee–Martin*	Liberty Bowl Memorial Stadium; Memphis, TN		L 17–20	39,076
September 8	6:00 p.m.	at Arkansas State*	Liberty Bank Stadium; Jonesboro, AR (Paint Bucket Bowl)	ESPN3	L 28–33	28,041
September 15	6:00 p.m.	Middle Tennessee*	Liberty Bowl Memorial Stadium; Memphis, TN		L 30–48	27,112
September 22	5:00 p.m.	at Duke*	Wallace Wade Stadium; Durham, NC	ESPN3	L 14–38	23,658
October 6	6:00 p.m.	Rice	Liberty Bowl Memorial Stadium; Memphis, TN	FCS	W 14–10	17,831
October 13	3:30 p.m.	at East Carolina	Dowdy–Ficklen Stadium; Greenville, NC	CSS/CSNH	L 7–41	45,137
October 20	7:00 p.m.	UCF	Liberty Bowl Memorial Stadium; Memphis, TN	CSS/CSNH	L 17–35	22,106
October 27	2:00 p.m.	at SMU	Gerald J. Ford Stadium; University Park, TX	TWC Texas	L 13–44	20,330
November 3	1:00 p.m.	at Marshall	Joan C. Edwards Stadium; Huntington, WV		L 28–38	22,041
November 10	6:00 p.m.	Tulane	Liberty Bowl Memorial Stadium; Memphis, TN		W 37–23	18,796
November 17	1:00 p.m.	at UAB	Legion Field; Birmingham, AL (Battle for the Bones)		W 46–9	9,219
November 24	2:30 p.m.	Southern Miss	Liberty Bowl Memorial Stadium; Memphis, TN (Black and Blue Bowl)	CSS/CSNH	W 42–24	21,305
*Non-conference game; All times are in Central time

== Game summaries ==
=== Tennessee–Martin ===
	1	2	3	4	Total
Skyhawks	0	7	7	6	20
Tigers	7	0	3	7	17

=== @ Arkansas State ===
	1	2	3	4	Total
Tigers	7	14	7	0	28
Red Wolves	3	14	10	6	33

=== Middle Tennessee ===
	1	2	3	4	Total
Blue Raiders	7	14	20	7	48
Tigers	3	14	6	7	30

=== @ Duke ===
	1	2	3	4	Total
Tigers	0	14	0	0	14
Blue Devils	0	17	7	14	38

=== Rice ===
	1	2	3	4	Total
Owls	7	3	0	0	10
Tigers	0	0	14	0	14

=== @ East Carolina ===
	1	2	3	4	Total
Tigers	0	0	0	7	7
Pirates	14	3	17	7	41

=== UCF ===
	1	2	3	4	Total
Knights	14	0	7	14	35
Tigers	0	10	0	7	17

=== @ SMU ===
	1	2	3	4	Total
Tigers	0	10	3	0	13
Mustangs	13	3	7	21	44

=== @ Marshall ===
	1	2	3	4	Total
Tigers	0	7	7	14	28
Thundering Herd	10	7	14	7	38

=== Tulane ===
	1	2	3	4	Total
Green Wave	10	3	3	7	23
Tigers	6	10	7	14	37

=== @ UAB ===
	1	2	3	4	Total
Tigers	21	7	3	15	46
Blazers	0	3	0	6	9

=== Southern Miss ===
	1	2	3	4	Total
Golden Eagles	3	7	0	14	24
Tigers	0	21	21	0	42
