= 2012 Tulane Green Wave football team =

American college football season

2012 Tulane Green Wave football
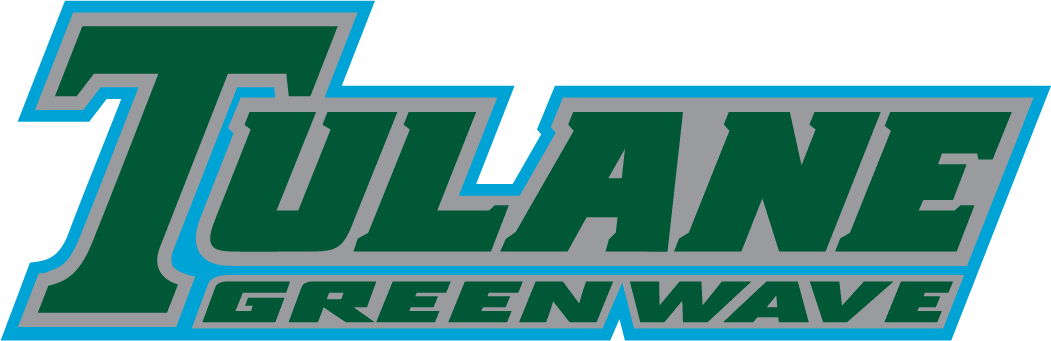
- Conference: Conference USA
- West Division
- Record: 2–10 (2–6 C-USA)
- Head coach: Curtis Johnson (1st season)
- Offensive coordinator: Eric Price (1st season)
- Offensive scheme: Pro-style
- Co-defensive coordinators: Jon Sumrall (1st season); Lionel Washington (1st season)
- Base defense: 3–4 or 4–3
- Home stadium: Mercedes-Benz Superdome

2012 Conference USA football standings
	Conf.			Overall
Team	W		L	W		L
East Division
UCF xy	7	–	1	10	–	4
East Carolina x	7	–	1	8	–	5
Marshall	4	–	4	5	–	7
Memphis	4	–	4	4	–	8
UAB	2	–	6	3	–	9
Southern Miss	0	–	8	0	–	12
West Division
Tulsa xy$	7	–	1	11	–	3
SMU	5	–	3	7	–	6
Rice	4	–	4	7	–	6
Houston	4	–	4	5	–	7
UTEP	2	–	6	3	–	9
Tulane	2	–	6	2	–	10
Championship: Tulsa 33, UCF 27
$ – Conference champion; x – Division champion/co-champions; y – Championship game participant; Rankings from AP Poll

The 2012 Tulane Green Wave football team represented Tulane University in the 2012 NCAA Division I FBS football season. The team was led by first-year head coach Curtis Johnson. The Green Wave played home games in the Mercedes-Benz Superdome and competed in the West Division of Conference USA. This was their final season in Conference USA as the prepared to move to the American Athletic Conference. They finished the season 2–10, 2–6 in C-USA play to finish in a tie for fifth place in the West Division.

== Pre-season ==
=== Recruits ===
College recruiting (2012)
Name	Hometown	School	Height	Weight	40^{‡}	Commit date
Kedrick Banks; WR	New Orleans, LA	McDonogh 35	5 ft 10 in (1.78 m)	175 lb (79 kg)	N/A	Jan 22, 2012
Kedrick Banks; WR	Recruit ratings: Scout: Rivals: (NR)					
Jordan Batiste; CB	Lutcher, LA	Lutcher	5 ft 9 in (1.75 m)	166 lb (75 kg)	4.50	Jan 15, 2012
Jordan Batiste; CB	Recruit ratings: Scout: Rivals: ESPN: (75)					
Bobby Bradley; OT	Medford, NJ	Shawnee	6 ft 4 in (1.93 m)	270 lb (120 kg)	N/A	Jul 31, 2011
Bobby Bradley; OT	Recruit ratings: Scout: Rivals: ESPN: (69)					
Devin Breaux; WR	Donaldsonville, LA	Donaldsonville	6 ft 0 in (1.83 m)	178 lb (81 kg)	4.55	May 2, 2012
Devin Breaux; WR	Recruit ratings: Scout: Rivals: ESPN: (78)					
Richard Carthon; RB	Shreveport, LA	CE Byrd	5 ft 9 in (1.75 m)	185 lb (84 kg)	N/A	Apr 22, 2012
Richard Carthon; RB	Recruit ratings: Scout: Rivals: (NR)					
Lorenzo Doss; WR	New Orleans, LA	Saint Augustine	6 ft 0 in (1.83 m)	188 lb (85 kg)	4.50	Jun 22, 2011
Lorenzo Doss; WR	Recruit ratings: Scout: Rivals: ESPN: (70)					
Colton Hanson; OT	New Braunfels, TX	New Braunfels	6 ft 6 in (1.98 m)	285 lb (129 kg)	N/A	Jun 30, 2011
Colton Hanson; OT	Recruit ratings: Scout: Rivals: (NR)					
Todd Jacquet; OG	New Orleans, LA	Jesuit	6 ft 5 in (1.96 m)	270 lb (120 kg)	N/A	Aug 1, 2011
Todd Jacquet; OG	Recruit ratings: Scout: Rivals: ESPN: (74)					
Royce LaFrance; OLB	Harvey, LA	Helen Cox	6 ft 3 in (1.91 m)	235 lb (107 kg)	4.50	Jan 21, 2012
Royce LaFrance; OLB	Recruit ratings: Scout: Rivals: ESPN: (72)					
Darion Monroe; CB	Reserve, LA	East St. John	5 ft 11 in (1.80 m)	180 lb (82 kg)	N/A	Jan 31, 2012
Darion Monroe; CB	Recruit ratings: Scout: Rivals: ESPN: (80)					
Alex Paul; OT	New Orleans, LA	Newman	6 ft 6 in (1.98 m)	310 lb (140 kg)	N/A	Jul 27, 2011
Alex Paul; OT	Recruit ratings: Scout: Rivals: (NR)					
Peter Picerelli; P	Providence, RI	LaSalle Academy	6 ft 1 in (1.85 m)	185 lb (84 kg)	N/A	Jul 17, 2012
Peter Picerelli; P	Recruit ratings: Scout: Rivals: (NR)					
Devin Powell; QB	New Orleans, LA	O. Perry Walker	6 ft 5 in (1.96 m)	212 lb (96 kg)	N/A	Jan 19, 2012
Devin Powell; QB	Recruit ratings: Scout: Rivals: (NR)					
Joshua Rounds; RB	New Orleans, LA	McMain Magnet	5 ft 11 in (1.80 m)	195 lb (88 kg)	N/A	Jan 22, 2012
Joshua Rounds; RB	Recruit ratings: Scout: Rivals: (NR)					
Nathan Shienle; OT	Tampa, FL	Plant	6 ft 5 in (1.96 m)	290 lb (130 kg)	N/A	Jan 15, 2012
Nathan Shienle; OT	Recruit ratings: Scout: Rivals: ESPN: (73)					
Calvin Thomas; DT	Chandler, AZ	Hamilton	6 ft 3 in (1.91 m)	258 lb (117 kg)	N/A	Jan 31, 2012
Calvin Thomas; DT	Recruit ratings: Scout: Rivals: ESPN: (73)					
Lazedrick Thompson; RB	LaPlace, LA	St. Charles Catholic	6 ft 1 in (1.85 m)	205 lb (93 kg)	N/A	May 27, 2011
Lazedrick Thompson; RB	Recruit ratings: Scout: Rivals: ESPN: (74)					
Fudge Van Hooser; QB	Montgomery, AL	Trinity Presbyterian	6 ft 2 in (1.88 m)	180 lb (82 kg)	4.37	Jul 11, 2010
Fudge Van Hooser; QB	Recruit ratings: Scout: Rivals: ESPN: (76)					
Overall recruit ranking: Scout: 95 Rivals: 80
‡ Refers to 40-yard dash; Note: In many cases, Scout, Rivals, 247Sports, On3, and ESPN may conflict in their listings of height, weight and 40 time.; In these cases, the average was taken. ESPN grades are on a 100-point scale.; Sources: "2012 Tulane Football Commitment List". Rivals.; "2012 Tulane Commits". Scout.; "Tulane Green Wave 2012". ESPN.; "Scout.com Team Recruiting Rankings". Scout.; "2012 Team Ranking". Rivals.com.

=== Award watch lists ===
==== Cairo Santos ====
- Lou Groza Award Watch List

==== Orleans Darkwa ====
- Doak Walker Award Candidate

==== Trent Mackey ====
- Bronko Nagurski Trophy Watch List
- Lombardi Award Watch List

== Roster ==
2012 Tulane Green Wave football team roster
Players
Coaches
Offense

Pos.	#	Name	Class
QB	1	Devin Powell	Fr
WR	3	Ryan Grant	Jr
WR	8	Marc Edwards	Fr
WR	9	Wilson Van Hooser	Jr
WR	10	Alec Macias	Fr
QB	11	Ryan Griffin	Sr
QB	12	DJ Ponder	Sr
RB	13	Derrick Strozier	Jr
WR	15	Devon Breaux	Fr
QB	16	Jordy Joseph	So
WR	22	Jamar Thomas	Jr
RB	24	Stephen Barnett	Sr
RB	25	Josh Rounds	Fr
RB	26	Orleans Darkwa	Jr
RB	28	Rob Kelley	Sr
RB	32	Danté Butler	So
RB	33	Lazedrick Thompson	Fr
WR	36	Devin Boutte	Fr
WR	39	Keith Harvey II	So
FB	40	Taylor Bullock	So
WR	42	Carlos Wilson	So
WR	46	JoJo Dobbs	Jr
OT	61	Colton Hanson	Fr
C	64	Mike Henry	Jr
C	65	Zach Morgan (injured)	Sr
OT	66	Nathan Shienle	Fr
G	67	Bob Bradley	Fr
OL	68	Greg Thomson	Fr
OT	70	Sean Donnelly	So
G	72	Rio Mares	Jr
G	73	Alex Paul	Fr
G	74	Adam Skidmore	So
OT	75	Arturo Uzdavinis	Fr
OT	76	Nate Skold	Fr
OL	77	Preston Paine	So
OT	78	Todd Jacquet	Fr
OT	79	Eric Jones	Sr
WR	80	Justyn Shackleford	So
WR	81	Sydie London	Fr
WR	82	Xavier Rush	So
TE	83	Evan Tatford	So
TE	84	Stephen Suchy	Jr
WR	85	Larry Dace	Fr
WR	86	Brent Comardelle	Jr
TE	87	Josh Drum	Fr
TE	88	Matt Marfisi	So
WR	89	Jacob Davis	Sr

Defense

Pos.	#	Name	Class
S	1	Shakiel Smith	Sr
CB	2	Darion Monroe	Fr
S	5	Brandon LeBeau	So
CB	6	Lorenzo Doss	Fr
S	7	Fudge Van Hooser	Fr
CB	10	Ryan Travis	Sr
CB	12	Kedrick Banks	Fr
CB	14	Jordan Batiste	Fr
CB	17	Alex Lauricella	Sr
S	18	Devon Walker (injured)	Sr
LB	20	Trent Mackey (S)	Sr
S	21	Kyle Davis	Jr
CB	23	Kendrell Washington	Sr
LB	27	Chris Hanuscin	Sr
DB	27	Richard Carthon	Fr
S	29	Renaldo Thomas	So
LB	34	Darryl Farley	Sr
S	35	Sam Scofield	So
S	37	LJ Parker	So
S	38	Anthony Bronzo	So
DE	41	Aaron Bryant	Fr
LB	43	David Laborde	Fr
CB	44	Kendrick Washington	Sr
LB	45	Matthew Bailey	So
LB	47	Cameron DeJean	So
LB	48	Royce LaFrance	Fr
LB	49	Kerchal Byrd	So
DE	50	Austen Jacks	Sr
DE	51	Michael Pierce, Jr. (I)	So
LB	52	Dominique Robertson	Jr
LB	53	Andre Robinson	So
DT	54	Devin Williams	Jr
DT	55	Taylor Perry	Fr
LB	57	Zach Davis	Jr
LB	58	Brandon Schmidt	So
LB	59	Ray Oppman	So
LB	60	Jacques Zelnik	Fr
LB	63	Logan Hamilton	Jr
DE	90	Wendell Beckwith	Jr
DT	92	Julius Warmsley	Jr
DT	93	Kenny Welcome	So
DE	94	Casey Blum	Sr
DT	96	Corey Redwine	Fr
DT	99	Calvin Thomas	Fr

Special teams

Pos.	#	Name	Class
P, K	6	Steven Broccoli	Fr
P	16	Jonathan Ginsburgh	Jr
K	19	Cairo Santos	Jr
K	30	Ryan Rome	Jr
P, K	31	Peter Picerelli	Fr
K	45	Stephen Purcell	Sr
P, K	91	Logan Hilton	Fr
DS	97	Billy Johnson	Sr

Head coach

- Curtis Johnson (1st season)

Coordinators/assistant coaches

- Eric Price – Offensive Coordinator
- Jon Sumrall – Co-Defensive Coordinator/Defensive Line
- Lionel Washington – Co-Defensive Coordinator/Secondary
- David Johnson – Tight Ends/Running Backs
- Barry Lamb – Linebackers/Special Teams
- John McDonell – Offensive Line
- Mike Neu – Quarterbacks
- Jason Rollins – Secondary
- Keith Williams – Wide Receivers
- Byron Ellis – Director of Football Operations
- Doug Lichtenberger – Assistant AD for Football Operations/Recruiting
- Kwahn Drake – Graduate Assistant Coach, Defense
- Chad Jenkins – Graduate Assistant Coach, Defense
- Mike McCarthy – Graduate Assistant Coach, Offense
- Casey Robottom – Graduate Assistant Coach, Offense

Legend

- (C) Team captain
- (S) Suspended
- (I) Ineligible
- Injured
- Redshirt

Roster
Last update: September 9, 2012

== Schedule ==
Date	Time	Opponent	Site	TV	Result	Attendance
September 1	7:00 pm	Rutgers*	Mercedes-Benz Superdome; New Orleans, LA	CBSSN	L 12–24	26,059
September 8	11:00 am	at Tulsa	Chapman Stadium; Tulsa, OK	FSN	L 10–45	17,880
September 22	11:00 am	Ole Miss*	Mercedes-Benz Superdome; New Orleans, LA	FSN	L 0–39	28,913
September 29	3:30 pm	Louisiana–Monroe*	Mercedes-Benz Superdome; New Orleans, LA	CST	L 10–63	18,063
October 6	4:00 pm	at Louisiana–Lafayette*	Cajun Field; Lafayette, LA	Cox 4/ESPN3	L 13–41	29,758
October 13	12:00 pm	SMU	Mercedes-Benz Superdome; New Orleans, LA	CSS	W 27–26	11,519
October 20	7:00 pm	at UTEP	Sun Bowl Stadium; El Paso, TX		L 20–24	23,234
October 27	2:30 pm	UAB	Mercedes-Benz Superdome; New Orleans, LA		W 55–45	12,531
November 3	2:30 pm	Rice^{†}	Mercedes-Benz Superdome; New Orleans, LA		L 47–49	15,467
November 10	6:00 pm	at Memphis	Liberty Bowl Memorial Stadium; Memphis, TN		L 23–37	18,796
November 17	2:30 pm	East Carolina	Mercedes-Benz Superdome; New Orleans, LA	CST	L 23–28	14,041
November 24	2:30 pm	at Houston	Robertson Stadium; Houston, TX	FSN	L 17–40	25,402
*Non-conference game; ^{†}Homecoming; All times are in Central time

== Game summaries ==
=== Rutgers ===
Rutgers at Tulane

Team	1	2	3	4	Total
• Rutgers	0	10	0	14	24
Tulane	0	3	0	9	12

- Location: New Orleans, LA
- Game start: 7:00 p.m. CDT
- Game attendance: 26,059
- Game weather: Indoors
- Television network: CBS Sports Network

=== Tulsa ===
Tulane at Tulsa

Team	1	2	3	4	Total
Tulane	3	0	0	7	10
• Tulsa	14	21	0	10	45

- Location: Tulsa, OK
- Game start: 11:00 a.m. CDT
- Game attendance: 17,880
- Television network: FSN

While the team trailed 35–3, senior Devon Walker fractured his cervical spine after colliding head-on with a teammate during a tackle.

=== Ole Miss ===
Ole Miss at Tulane

Team	1	2	3	4	Total
• Ole Miss	26	0	10	3	39
Tulane	0	0	0	0	0

- Location: New Orleans, LA
- Game start: 11:00 a.m. CDT
- Elapsed time: 3:13
- Game attendance: 28,913
- Game weather: Indoors
- Referee: Steve LaMantia
- Television network: FSN

Scoring summary
1	12:50	MISS	Jeff Scott 13-yard run (pass failed)	MISS 6-0
1	6:24	MISS	Ja-Mes Logan 14-yard run (run failed)	MISS 12-0
1	3:04	MISS	Randall Mackey 28-yard run (Bryson Rose kick)	MISS 19-0
1	1:24	MISS	Donte Moncrief 23-yard pass from Bo Wallace (Bryson Rose kick)	MISS 26-0
3	7:56	MISS	Jeff Scott 4-yard run (Bryson Rose kick)	MISS 33-0
3	4:50	MISS	Bryson Rose 40-yard field goal	MISS 36-0
4	5:09	MISS	Bryson Rose 47-yard field goal	MISS 39-0

=== Louisiana–Monroe ===
Louisiana–Monroe at Tulane

Team	1	2	3	4	Total
• UL-Monroe	21	14	21	7	63
Tulane	0	3	0	7	10

- Location: New Orleans, LA
- Game start: 2:30 p.m. CDT
- Game attendance: 18,063
- Game weather: Indoors
- Television network: CST

=== Louisiana–Lafayette ===
Tulane at Louisiana-Lafayette

Team	1	2	3	4	Total
Tulane	0	10	0	3	13
• UL-Lafayette	3	21	14	3	41

- Location: Lafayette, LA
- Game start: 4:00 p.m. CDT
- Game attendance: 29,758
- Television network: Cox4, ESPN3

=== SMU ===
SMU at Tulane

Team	1	2	3	4	Total
SMU	3	3	3	17	26
• Tulane	10	10	0	7	27

- Location: New Orleans, LA
- Game start: 12:00 p.m. CDT
- Game attendance: 11,519
- Game weather: Indoors
- Television network: CSS

=== UTEP ===
Tulane at UTEP

Team	1	2	3	4	Total
Tulane	7	10	0	3	20
• UTEP	7	17	0	0	24

- Location: El Paso, TX
- Game start: 7:00 p.m. MDT
- Game attendance: 23,234

=== UAB ===
UAB at Tulane

Team	1	2	3	4	Total
UAB	7	10	14	14	45
• Tulane	14	17	7	17	55

- Location: New Orleans, LA
- Game start: 2:30 p.m. CDT
- Game attendance: 12,531
- Game weather: Indoors

=== Rice ===
Rice at Tulane
(Homecoming game)

Team	1	2	3	4	Total
• Rice	14	14	7	14	49
Tulane	7	3	28	9	47

- Location: New Orleans, LA
- Game start: 2:30 p.m. CDT
- Game attendance: 15,467
- Game weather: Indoors

=== Memphis ===
Tulane at Memphis

Team	1	2	3	4	Total
Tulane	10	3	3	7	23
• Memphis	6	10	7	14	37

- Location: Memphis, TN
- Game start: 6:00 p.m. CST
- Game attendance: 18,796

=== East Carolina ===
East Carolina at Tulane

Team	1	2	3	4	Total
• E Carolina	0	14	7	7	28
Tulane	7	6	3	7	23

- Location: New Orleans, LA
- Game start: 2:30 p.m. CST
- Game attendance: 14,041
- Game weather: Indoors
- Television network: CST

=== Houston ===
Tulane at Houston

Team	1	2	3	4	Total
Tulane	0	7	10	0	17
• Houston	17	3	7	13	40

- Location: Houston, TX
- Game start: 3:30 p.m. CST
- Game attendance: 25,402
- Television network: FSN

== Statistics ==
As of November 17, 2012

=== Team ===
	Team	Opp
Scoring	240	421
Points per Game	21.8	38.3
First downs	194	277
Rushing	39	136
Passing	130	118
Penalty	25	23
Total Offense	3445	5200
Avg per Play	4.7	6.3
Avg per Game	313.2	472.7
Fumbles-Lost	18–11	17–9
Penalties-Yards	70–600	60–577
Avg per Game	5.8–54.5	5.0–52.5

	Team	Opp
Punts-Yards	63–2580	41–1670
Avg per Punt	41.0	40.7
Time of Possession/Game	29:21	30:39
3rd Down Conversions	62/164	71/152
4th Down Conversions	4/17	6/14
Touchdowns Scored	26	55
Field goals-Attempts	20–20	13–19
PAT-Attempts	24–25	52–53
Attendance	126,593	89,668
Games/Avg per Game	7/18,085	5/22,417

==== Score by quarters ====
	1	2	3	4	OT	Total
Tulane	58	65	41	76	0	240
Opponents	101	134	83	103	0	421

=== Offense ===
==== Rushing ====
Name	GP-GS	Att	Gain	Loss	Net	Avg	TD	Long	Avg/G
Rob Kelley	11–4	80	292	11	281	3.5	0	15	25.5
Orleans Darkwa	8–5	70	247	29	218	3.1	3	32	27.2
Dante Butler	11–1	34	122	7	115	3.4	0	15	10.5
Josh Rounds	9–0	17	44	4	40	2.4	0	7	4.4
Derrick Strozier	9–1	4	13	1	12	3.0	0	6	1.3
Stephen Barnett	11–3	1	2	0	2	2.0	0	2	0.2
DJ Ponder	2–2	5	0	36	−36	−7.2	0	0	−18.0
Devin Powell	2–1	14	23	67	−44	−3.1	0	10	−22.0
TEAM	4–0	5	0	56	−56	−11.2	0	0	−14.0
Ryan Griffin	8–8	29	28	128	−100	−3.4	0	6	−12.5
Total	11	259	771	339	432	1.7	3	32	39.3

==== Passing ====
Name	GP-GS	Effic	Att-Cmp-Int	Pct	Yds	TD	Lng	Avg/G
Ryan Griffin	8–8	139.66	209–328–7	63.7	2425	18	79	303.1
DJ Ponder	2–2	71.77	35–83–5	42.2	333	2	71	166.5
Devin Powell	2–1	85.47	30–57–3	52.6	255	1	66	127.5
Ryan Grant	11–11	0.00	0–1–0	0.0	0	0	0	0.0
Peter Picerelli	11–0	−200.00	0–1–1	0.0	0	0	0	0.0
Total	11	120.08	274–470–16	58.3	3013	21	79	273.9

==== Receiving ====
Name	GP-GS	No.	Yds	Avg	TD	Long	Avg/G
Ryan Grant	11–11	63	1041	16.5	6	68	94.6
Rob Kelley	11–4	46	340	7.4	4	31	30.9
Xavier Rush	11–1	37	439	11.9	4	62	39.9
Justyn Shackleford	9–8	28	431	15.4	2	71	47.9
Marc Edwards	11–2	19	236	12.4	1	79	21.5
Josh Rounds	9–0	14	78	5.6	0	21	8.7
Dante Butler	11–1	12	63	5.2	0	14	5.7
Derrick Strozier	9–1	11	60	5.5	0	13	10.0
Wilson Van Hooser	11–1	10	176	17.6	4	35	16.0
Orleans Darkwa	8–5	9	43	4.8	0	13	5.4
Matt Marfisi	11–8	8	20	2.5	0	6	1.8
Sydie London	10–3	6	38	6.3	0	11	3.8
Evan Tatford	10–4	6	20	3.3	0	10	2.0
Brent Comardelle	10–0	3	27	9.0	0	10	2.7
Devin Boutte	7–0	1	6	6.0	0	6	0.9
Stephen Barnett	11–3	1	−5	−5.0	0	0	−0.5
Total	11	274	3013	11.0	21	79	273.9

=== Defense ===
Name	GP-GS	Tackles				Sacks	Pass Defense			Fumbles		Blkd Kick	Saf
Name	GP-GS	Solo	Ast	Total	TFL-Yds	No-Yds	Int-Yds	BrUp	QBH	Rcv-Yds	FF	Blkd Kick	Saf
Darion Monroe	11–11	54	30	84	1.0–2	0–0	0–0	0	0	3–92	0	0	0
Zach Davis	11–8	50	28	78	5.0–16	2.0–11	1–35	3	2	0–0	0	0	0
Darryl Farley	11–9	26	24	50	3.5–14	1.0–9	0–0	2	0	0–0	1	0	0
Ryan Travis	11–11	32	17	49	3.5–17	1.0–11	2–96	7	0	1–0	1	0	0
Shakiel Smith	10–8	33	9	42	1.0–1	0–0	1–39	5	0	1–0	0	0	0
Lorenzo Doss	11–8	31	8	39	0–0	0–0	4–89	2	0	1–0	0	0	0
Austen Jacks	11–11	20	17	37	8.5–51	4.5–39	0–0	0	1	0–0	0	0	0
Jordan Batiste	11–9	29	8	37	1.0–1	0–0	1–0	4	0	0–0	0	0	0
Sam Scofield	9–2	21	10	31	1.0–1	0–0	2–30	1	0	0–0	1	0	0
Dominique Robertson	10–1	23	8	31	2.5–8	1.0–5	0–0	0	0	0–0	1	0	0
Matthew Bailey	11–8	20	7	27	2.0–5	0–0	1–37	4	3	0–0	0	0	0
Kenny Welcome	11–10	13	13	26	3.0–14	1.5–10	0–0	2	0	0–0	2	0	0
Julius Warmsley	10–9	11	14	25	5.0–12	2.0–7	0–0	0	3	0–0	1	2	0
Logan Hamilton	11–0	14	7	21	5.5–13	0–0	0–0	0	0	0–0	0	0	0
Calvin Thomas	11–0	9	11	20	2.0–14	2.0–14	0–0	1	0	0–0	0	0	0
Andre Robinson	11–0	10	9	19	0–0	0–0	0–0	0	0	0–0	0	0	0
Corey Redwine	10–3	12	7	19	1.0–2	0–0	0–0	0	0	0–0	1	0	0
Royce LaFrance	11–1	11	7	18	2.5–4	1.0–1	0–0	1	0	0–0	0	0	0
Aaron Bryant	10–9	10	8	18	2.0–5	1.0–4	0–0	1	2	1–0	0	0	0
Kyle Davis	11–0	9	7	16	0–0	0–0	0–0	0	0	0–0	0	0	0
Cameron DeJean	7–0	6	7	13	0–0	0–0	0–0	0	0	0–0	0	0	0
Devon Walker	2–2	9	2	11	1–2	0–0	0–0	0	0	0–0	0	0	0
Brandon LeBeau	11–0	5	3	8	0–0	0–0	0–0	0	0	0–0	0	0	0
Alex Lauricella	10–0	6	2	8	0–0	0–0	0–0	1	0	1–0	0	0	0
Renaldo Thomas	9–1	2	5	7	0–0	0–0	0–0	1	0	0–0	0	0	0
Taylor Bullock	11–0	6	0	6	0–0	0–0	0–0	0	0	0–0	0	0	0
Richard Carthon	11–0	5	1	6	0–0	0–0	0–0	0	0	0–0	0	0	0
Rob Kelley	11–4	3	2	5	0–0	0–0	0–0	0	0	0–0	0	0	0
Devin Boutte	7–0	4	0	4	0–0	0–0	0–0	0	0	0–0	0	0	0
Wendell Beckwith	5–0	3	1	4	1.0–1	0–0	0–0	0	0	1–0	0	0	0
Kerchal Byrd	9–0	3	1	4	0–0	0–0	0–0	0	0	0–0	0	0	0
Brent Comardelle	10–0	1	2	3	0–0	0–0	0–0	0	0	0–0	0	0	0
Devin Williams	8–0	2	0	2	0–0	0–0	0–0	0	0	0–0	0	0	0
Ryan Griffin	8–8	2	0	2	0–0	0–0	0–0	0	0	0–0	0	0	0
Adam Skidmore	11–11	1	0	1	0–0	0–0	0–0	0	0	0–0	0	0	0
Billy Johnson	11–0	1	0	1	0–0	0–0	0–0	0	0	0–0	0	0	0
Derrick Strozier	9–1	1	0	1	0–0	0–0	0–0	0	0	0–0	1	0	0
Ryan Grant	11–11	1	0	1	0–0	0–0	0–0	0	0	0–0	1	0	0
Dante Butler	11–1	1	0	1	0–0	0–0	0–0	0	0	0–0	1	0	0
Cairo Santos	11–0	1	0	1	0–0	0–0	0–0	0	0	0–0	0	0	0
Brandon Schmidt	2–0	0	1	1	0–0	0–0	0–0	0	0	0–0	0	0	0
Peter Picerelli	11–0	1	0	1	0–0	0–0	0–0	0	0	0–0	0	0	0
Total	11	502	276	778	52–183	17–111	13–326	35	11	9–92	9	2	0

=== Special teams ===
Name	Punting									Kickoffs				
Name	No.	Yds	Avg	Long	TB	FC	i20	50+	Blkd	No.	Yds	Avg	TB	OB
Peter Picerelli	61	2507	41.1	70	2	11	13	7	0					
Jonathan Ginsburgh	2	73	36.5	43	0	1	0	0	0					
Cairo Santos										51	3265	64.0	30	2
Ryan Rome										1	60	60.0	0	0
Total	63	2580	41.0	70	2	12	13	7	0	52	3325	63.9	30	2

Name	Punt returns					Kick returns				
Name	No.	Yds	Avg	TD	Long	No.	Yds	Avg	TD	Long
Derrick Strozier	9	81	9.0	0	19	0	0	0	0	0
Darion Monroe	3	63	21.0	0	57	0	0	0	0	0
Josh Rounds	0	0	0	0	0	22	403	18.3	0	29
Richard Carthon	0	0	0	0	0	8	166	20.8	0	30
Dante Butler	0	0	0	0	0	5	84	16.8	0	25
Rob Kelley	0	0	0	0	0	3	65	21.7	0	30
Total	12	144	12.0	0	57	38	718	18.9	0	30

== After the season ==
=== Awards ===
==== Cairo Santos ====
- Lou Groza Award
- Consensus All-American
