= 2012 Tulsa Golden Hurricane football team =

American college football season

2012 Tulsa Golden Hurricane football

C-USA champion C-USA West Division champion Liberty Bowl champion

C-USA Championship Game, W 33–27 ^{OT} vs. UCF

Liberty Bowl, W 31–17 vs. Iowa State
- Conference: Conference USA
- West Division

Ranking
- Coaches: No. 25
- Record: 11–3 (7–1 C-USA)
- Head coach: Bill Blankenship (2nd season)
- Offensive coordinator: Greg Peterson (2nd season)
- Defensive coordinator: Brent Guy (2nd season)
- Home stadium: Skelly Field at H. A. Chapman Stadium

2012 Conference USA football standings
	Conf.			Overall
Team	W		L	W		L
East Division
UCF xy	7	–	1	10	–	4
East Carolina x	7	–	1	8	–	5
Marshall	4	–	4	5	–	7
Memphis	4	–	4	4	–	8
UAB	2	–	6	3	–	9
Southern Miss	0	–	8	0	–	12
West Division
Tulsa xy$	7	–	1	11	–	3
SMU	5	–	3	7	–	6
Rice	4	–	4	7	–	6
Houston	4	–	4	5	–	7
UTEP	2	–	6	3	–	9
Tulane	2	–	6	2	–	10
Championship: Tulsa 33, UCF 27
$ – Conference champion; x – Division champion/co-champions; y – Championship game participant; Rankings from AP Poll

The 2012 Tulsa Golden Hurricane football team represented the University of Tulsa in the 2012 NCAA Division I FBS football season. They were led by second-year head coach Bill Blankenship and played their home games at Skelly Field at H. A. Chapman Stadium. They were a member of the West Division of Conference USA (C-US). They finished the season 11–3, 7–1 C-USA to be West Division champions. They defeated UCF in the C-USA Championship Game to become C-USA champions. They were invited to the Liberty Bowl, where they defeated Iowa State to avenge a season-opening loss.

== Schedule ==
Date	Time	Opponent	Site	TV	Result	Attendance
September 1	2:30 p.m.	at Iowa State*	Jack Trice Stadium; Ames, IA	FSN	L 23–38	54,931
September 8	11:00 a.m.	Tulane	Skelly Field at H. A. Chapman Stadium; Tulsa, OK	FSN	W 45–10	17,880
September 15	6:00 p.m.	Nicholls State*	Skelly Field at H. A. Chapman Stadium; Tulsa, OK		W 66–16	19,139
September 22	7:00 p.m.	Fresno State*	Skelly Field at H. A. Chapman Stadium; Tulsa, OK	CBSSN	W 27–26	24,236
September 29	2:00 p.m.	at UAB	Legion Field; Birmingham, AL		W 49–42	13,196
October 6	2:30 p.m.	at Marshall	Joan C. Edwards Stadium; Huntington, WV	CBSSN	W 45–38	27,189
October 11	7:00 p.m.	UTEP	Skelly Field at H. A. Chapman Stadium; Tulsa, OK	FSN	W 33–11	18,961
October 20	2:30 p.m.	Rice	Skelly Field at H. A. Chapman Stadium; Tulsa, OK	FSN	W 28–24	22,567
November 3	11:21 a.m.	at Arkansas*	Donald W. Reynolds Razorback Stadium; Fayetteville, AR	SECN	L 15–19	64,451
November 10	4:00 p.m.	at Houston	Robertson Stadium; Houston, TX	CBSSN	W 41–7	25,827
November 17	11:00 a.m.	UCF	Skelly Field at H. A. Chapman Stadium; Tulsa, OK	FSN	W 23–21	19,725
November 24	11:00 a.m.	at SMU	Gerald J. Ford Stadium; University Park, TX	FSN	L 27–35	15,336
December 1	11:00 a.m.	UCF	Skelly Field at H. A. Chapman Stadium; Tulsa, OK (Conference USA Championship Game)	ESPN2	W 33–27 ^{OT}	17,635
December 31	2:30 p.m.	vs. Iowa State*	Liberty Bowl Memorial Stadium; Memphis, TN (Liberty Bowl)	ESPN	W 31–17	53,687
*Non-conference game; All times are in Central time

== Game summaries ==
=== At Iowa State ===
	1	2	3	4	Total
Golden Hurricane	16	0	0	7	23
Cyclones	7	17	7	7	38

=== Tulane ===
	1	2	3	4	Total
Green Wave	3	0	0	7	10
Golden Hurricane	14	21	0	10	45

=== Nicholls State ===
	1	2	3	4	Total
Colonels	6	3	0	7	16
Golden Hurricane	28	14	10	14	66

=== Fresno State ===
	1	2	3	4	Total
Bulldogs	20	0	6	0	26
Golden Hurricane	7	10	10	0	27

Last meeting was in the 2005 Liberty Bowl. This will be the first regular season meeting not as conference members as their meetings between 1999 and 2002 were as members of the Western Athletic Conference.

=== At UAB ===
	1	2	3	4	Total
Golden Hurricane	21	14	7	7	49
Blazers	14	7	7	14	42

=== At Marshall ===
	1	2	3	4	Total
Golden Hurricane	10	7	20	8	45
Thundering Herd	3	14	15	6	38

=== UTEP ===
	1	2	3	4	Total
Miners	3	0	0	8	11
Golden Hurricane	3	3	20	7	33

=== Rice ===
	1	2	3	4	Total
Owls	7	14	0	3	24
Golden Hurricane	7	7	7	7	28

=== At Arkansas ===
	1	2	3	4	Total
Golden Hurricane	0	3	12	0	15
Razorbacks	10	3	0	6	19

Tulsa has lost the previous 17 meetings dating back to 1977.

=== At Houston ===
	1	2	3	4	Total
Golden Hurricane	3	14	7	17	41
Cougars	0	0	0	7	7

=== UCF ===
	1	2	3	4	Total
Knights	0	14	0	7	21
Golden Hurricane	10	0	13	0	23

=== At SMU ===
	1	2	3	4	Total
Golden Hurricane	0	6	6	15	27
Mustangs	7	21	7	0	35

=== UCF–C-USA Championship Game ===
	1	2	3	4	OT	Total
Knights	0	14	13	0	0	27
Golden Hurricane	7	14	0	6	6	33

=== Vs. Iowa State–Liberty Bowl ===
	1	2	3	4	Total
Cyclones	17	0	0	0	17
Golden Hurricane	7	14	7	3	31

This is the second time this season the Golden Hurricane and Cyclones will meet. The Cyclones won the season opener 38–23.
