= 2012 UAB Blazers football team =

American college football season

2012 UAB Blazers football
- Conference: Conference USA
- East Division
- Record: 3–9 (2–6 C-USA)
- Head coach: Garrick McGee (1st season)
- Offensive coordinator: Jeff Brohm (1st season)
- Offensive scheme: Multiple
- Defensive coordinator: Reggie Johnson (1st season)
- Base defense: 4–3
- Home stadium: Legion Field

2012 Conference USA football standings
	Conf.			Overall
Team	W		L	W		L
East Division
UCF xy	7	–	1	10	–	4
East Carolina x	7	–	1	8	–	5
Marshall	4	–	4	5	–	7
Memphis	4	–	4	4	–	8
UAB	2	–	6	3	–	9
Southern Miss	0	–	8	0	–	12
West Division
Tulsa xy$	7	–	1	11	–	3
SMU	5	–	3	7	–	6
Rice	4	–	4	7	–	6
Houston	4	–	4	5	–	7
UTEP	2	–	6	3	–	9
Tulane	2	–	6	2	–	10
Championship: Tulsa 33, UCF 27
$ – Conference champion; x – Division champion/co-champions; y – Championship game participant; Rankings from AP Poll

The 2012 UAB Blazers football team represented the University of Alabama at Birmingham (UAB) as a member of the East Division in Conference USA (C-USA) during the 2012 NCAA Division I FBS football season. Led by first-year head coach Garrick McGee, the Blazers compiled an overall record of 3–9 with a mark of 2–6 in conference play, placing fifth in C-USA's East Division. The team played home games at Legion Field in Birmingham, Alabama.

== Schedule ==
Date	Time	Opponent	Site	TV	Result	Attendance	Source
September 1	11:00 a.m.	Troy*	Legion Field; Birmingham, AL	FCS	L 29–39	28,612	
September 15	6:00 p.m.	at No. 8 South Carolina*	Williams-Brice Stadium; Columbia, SC	SECRN	L 6–49	77,963	
September 22	11:00 a.m.	at Ohio State*	Ohio Stadium; Columbus, OH	BTN	L 15–29	105,019	
September 29	2:00 p.m.	Tulsa	Legion Field; Birmingham, AL		L 42–49	13,196	
October 6	2:00 p.m.	Southeastern Louisiana*	Legion Field; Birmingham, AL		W 52–3	16,212	
October 13	11:00 a.m.	at Houston	Robertson Stadium; Houston, TX	FSN	L 17–39	25,242	
October 20	6:00 p.m.	East Carolina	Legion Field; Birmingham, AL	FCS	L 35–42	12,403	
October 27	2:30 p.m.	at Tulane	Mercedes-Benz Superdome; New Orleans, LA		L 45–55	12,531	
November 3	6:30 p.m.	at Southern Miss	M. M. Roberts Stadium; Hattiesburg, MS	CSS, CSNH	W 27–19	22,874	
November 10	3:30 p.m.	Marshall	Legion Field; Birmingham, AL	CSS, CSNH	W 38–31	11,981	
November 17	1:00 p.m.	Memphis	Legion Field; Birmingham, AL (Battle for the Bones)		L 9–46	9,219	
November 24	11:00 a.m.	at UCF	Bright House Networks Stadium; Orlando, FL	FSN	L 24–49	28,602	
*Non-conference game; Rankings from AP Poll released prior to the game; All times are in Central time

== Game summaries ==
=== Troy ===
	1	2	3	4	Total
Trojans	10	7	15	7	39
Blazers	0	7	16	6	29

=== @ South Carolina ===
	1	2	3	4	Total
Blazers	3	3	0	0	6
#9 Gamecocks	7	14	14	14	49

=== @ Ohio State ===
	1	2	3	4	Total
Blazers	6	6	0	3	15
Buckeyes	0	21	0	8	29

=== Tulsa ===
	1	2	3	4	Total
Golden Hurricane	21	14	7	7	49
Blazers	14	7	7	14	42

=== Southeastern Louisiana ===
	1	2	3	4	Total
Lions	0	3	0	0	3
Blazers	21	10	7	14	52

=== @ Houston ===
	1	2	3	4	Total
Blazers	7	3	0	7	17
Cougars	10	6	20	3	39

=== East Carolina ===
	1	2	3	4	Total
Pirates	7	6	14	15	42
Blazers	0	14	7	14	35

=== @ Tulane ===
	1	2	3	4	Total
Blazers	7	10	14	14	45
Green Wave	14	17	7	17	55

=== @ Southern Miss ===
	1	2	3	4	Total
Blazers	0	0	14	13	27
Golden Eagles	0	16	3	0	19

=== Marshall ===
	1	2	3	4	Total
Thundering Herd	7	0	7	17	31
Blazers	14	10	7	7	38

=== Memphis ===
	1	2	3	4	Total
Tigers	21	7	3	15	46
Blazers	0	3	0	6	9

=== @ UCF ===
	1	2	3	4	Total
Blazers	0	10	7	7	24
Knights	14	21	7	7	49
