= 2012 SMU Mustangs football team =

American college football season

2012 SMU Mustangs football

Hawaii Bowl champion

Hawaii Bowl, W 43–10 vs. Fresno State
- Conference: Conference USA
- West Division
- Record: 7–6 (5–3 C-USA)
- Head coach: June Jones (5th season)
- Co-offensive coordinator: Jason Phillips (1st season)
- Offensive scheme: Run and shoot
- Defensive coordinator: Tom Mason (5th season)
- Base defense: 3–4
- Home stadium: Gerald J. Ford Stadium

2012 Conference USA football standings
	Conf.			Overall
Team	W		L	W		L
East Division
UCF xy	7	–	1	10	–	4
East Carolina x	7	–	1	8	–	5
Marshall	4	–	4	5	–	7
Memphis	4	–	4	4	–	8
UAB	2	–	6	3	–	9
Southern Miss	0	–	8	0	–	12
West Division
Tulsa xy$	7	–	1	11	–	3
SMU	5	–	3	7	–	6
Rice	4	–	4	7	–	6
Houston	4	–	4	5	–	7
UTEP	2	–	6	3	–	9
Tulane	2	–	6	2	–	10
Championship: Tulsa 33, UCF 27
$ – Conference champion; x – Division champion/co-champions; y – Championship game participant; Rankings from AP Poll

The 2012 SMU Mustangs football team represented Southern Methodist University in the 2012 NCAA Division I FBS football season as members of Conference USA in the West Division. June Jones led the Mustangs in his fifth season. The Mustangs played home games in University Park, Texas (an enclave of Dallas, Texas) at Gerald J. Ford Stadium. This was SMU's last year as a member of Conference USA as they will join the Big East Conference in 2013. They finished the season 7–6, 5–3 in C-USA play to finish in second place in the West Division. They were invited to the Hawaii Bowl where they defeated Fresno State.

== Preseason ==
=== Award watch lists ===
- Darius Johnson : Biletnikoff Award
- Ja'Gared Davis : Butkus Award
- Blake McJunkin : Rimington Trophy
- Zach Line : Doak Walker Award

=== Weekly Awards ===
- Kevin Pope Named Conference USA Special Teams Player of the Week.
- Kenneth Acker Named Conference USA Defensive Player of the Week.
- Randall Joyner Named Conference USA Defensive Player of the Week.

== Schedule ==
Date	Time	Opponent	Site	TV	Result	Attendance
September 2	5:30 p.m.	at Baylor*	Floyd Casey Stadium; Waco, TX	FSN	L 24–59	43,514
September 8	7:00 p.m.	Stephen F. Austin*	Gerald J. Ford Stadium; University Park, TX	TWC Texas	W 52–0	20,122
September 15	2:30 p.m.	Texas A&M*	Gerald J. Ford Stadium; University Park, TX	FSN	L 3–48	32,016
September 29	6:00 pm	No. 15 TCU*	Gerald J. Ford Stadium; University Park, TX (Battle for the Iron Skillet)	FSN	L 16–24	28,436
October 6	7:00 p.m.	at UTEP	Sun Bowl Stadium; El Paso, TX	TWC Texas	W 17–0	34,073
October 13	12:00 p.m.	at Tulane	Mercedes-Benz Superdome; New Orleans, LA	CSS/CSNH	L 26–27	11,519
October 18	7:00 p.m.	Houston	Gerald J. Ford Stadium; University Park, TX (rivalry)	FSN	W 72–42	16,459
October 27	2:30 p.m.	Memphis	Gerald J. Ford Stadium; University Park, TX	TWC Texas	W 44–13	20,330
November 3	6:00 p.m.	at UCF	Bright House Networks Stadium; Orlando, FL	CBSSN	L 17–42	36,036
November 10	2:30 p.m.	Southern Miss	Gerald J. Ford Stadium; University Park, TX	FSN	W 34–6	16,343
November 17	2:30 p.m.	at Rice	Rice Stadium; Houston, TX (Battle for the Mayor's Cup)	CSS/CSNH	L 14–36	20,710
November 24	11:00 a.m.	Tulsa	Gerald J. Ford Stadium; University Park, TX	FSN	W 35–27	15,336
December 24	7:00 p.m.	vs. Fresno State*	Aloha Stadium; Honolulu, HI (Hawaii Bowl)	ESPN	W 43–10	30,024
*Non-conference game; Rankings from AP Poll released prior to the game; All times are in Central time

== Game summaries ==
=== @ Baylor ===
SMU at Baylor

Team	1	2	3	4	Total
Mustangs	0	3	7	14	24
• Bears	14	10	21	14	59

- Date: September 2
- Location: Floyd Casey Stadium
  Waco, TX
- Game start: 5:35 pm CST
- Elapsed time: 3:45
- Game attendance: 43,514
- Game weather: 100 °F (38 °C), Sunny & Very Hot, winds S at 12mph
- Referee: Tom Walker
- TV announcers (FSN): Joel Meyers, Brian Baldinger, and Jim Knox

Scoring summary

Quarter	Time	Drive			Team	Scoring information	Score	
Quarter	Time	Plays	Yards	TOP	Team	Scoring information	SMU	Baylor
1	11:18	10	75	3:42	Baylor	Lanear Sampson 6-yard touchdown reception from Nick Florence, Aaron Jones kick good	0	7
1	6:27	7	74	1:40	Baylor	Jordan Najvar 5-yard touchdown reception from Nick Florence, Aaron Jones kick good	0	14
2	12:52	16	66	6:16	SMU	22-yard field goal by Chase Hover	3	14
2	2:02	3	75	0:39	Baylor	Tevin Reese 50-yard touchdown reception from Nick Florence, Aaron Jones kick good	3	21
2	0:00	16	50	0:59	Baylor	44-yard field goal by Aaron Jones	3	24
3	10:22				Baylor	Fumble recovery returned 66 yards for touchdown by Bayl Mike Hicks, Aaron jones kick good	3	31
3	6:11	9	60	1:59	Baylor	Jarred Salubi 9-yard touchdown run, Aaron Jones kick good	3	38
3	2:39	2	74	0:33	Baylor	Lanear Sampson 36-yard touchdown reception from Nick Florence, Aaron Jones kick good	3	45
3	1:58	2	75	0:41	SMU	Der'rikk Thompson 42-yard touchdown reception from Garrett Gilbert, Chase Hover kick good	10	45
4	11:34	6	25	2:06	Baylor	Glasco Martin 1-yard touchdown run, Aaron Jones kick good	10	52
4	4:49	16	73	6:45	SMU	Jeremy Johnson 4-yard touchdown reception from Garrett Gilbert, Chase Hover kick good	17	52
4	4:00	4	75	0:49	Baylor	Darryl Stonum 37-yard touchdown reception from Bryce Petty, Kolton Lye kick good	17	59
4	2:25	4	72	1:35	SMU	Gehrig Dieter 40-yard touchdown reception from Conner Preston, Chase Hover kick good	24	59
"TOP" = time of possession. For other American football terms, see Glossary of American football.							24	59

=== Stephen F. Austin ===
Stephen F. Austin at SMU

Team	1	2	3	4	Total
Lumberjacks	0	0	0	0	0
• Mustangs	0	21	14	17	52

- Date: September 8
- Location: Gerald J. Ford Stadium
  University Park, TX
- Game start: 7:05 p.m. CST
- Elapsed time: 3:30
- Game attendance: 20,122
- Game weather: 84 °F (29 °C), Clear, winds NE at 10mph
- Referee: Steve Barth
- TV announcers (TWC Texas): John Nelson, Pete Stein, and Dave Michaels

Scoring summary

Quarter	Time	Drive			Team	Scoring information	Score	
Quarter	Time	Plays	Yards	TOP	Team	Scoring information	Stephen F. Austin	SMU
2	12:13	14	90	7:44	SMU	Zach Line 3-yard touchdown run, Chase Hover kick good	0	7
2	10:18	3	31	1:25	SMU	Zach Line 1-yard touchdown run, Chase Hover kick good	0	14
2	0:00				SMU	Kenneth Acker returns blocked FG attempt 56 yards for touchdown, Chase Hover kick good	0	21
3	9:23	8	73	3:29	SMU	Keenan Holman 25-yard touchdown reception from Garrett Gilbert, Chase Hover kick good	0	28
3	6:14				SMU	Fumble recovery returned 34 yards for touchdown by Ja'Gared Davis, Chase Hover kick good	0	35
4	14:55	5	34	2:08	SMU	43-yard field goal by Chase Hover	0	38
4	13:12				SMU	Interception returned 77 yards for touchdown by Kenneth Acker, Chase Hover kick good	0	45
4	10:46				SMU	Interception returned 96 yards for touchdown by Cameron Rogers, Chase Hover kick good	0	52
"TOP" = time of possession. For other American football terms, see Glossary of American football.							0	52

=== Texas A&M ===
	1	2	3	4	Total
Aggies	0	20	21	7	48
Mustangs	0	0	3	0	3

=== TCU ===
	1	2	3	4	Total
Horned Frogs	14	7	0	3	24
Mustangs	0	10	0	6	16

=== @ UTEP ===
	1	2	3	4	Total
Mustangs	3	14	0	0	17
Miners	0	0	0	0	0

=== @ Tulane ===
	1	2	3	4	Total
Mustangs	3	3	3	17	26
Green Wave	10	10	0	7	27

=== Houston ===
	1	2	3	4	Total
Cougars	7	7	14	14	42
Mustangs	14	14	31	13	72

=== Memphis ===
	1	2	3	4	Total
Tigers	0	10	3	0	13
Mustangs	13	3	7	21	44

=== @ UCF ===
	1	2	3	4	Total
Mustangs	3	7	0	7	17
Knights	7	14	14	7	42

=== Southern Miss ===
	1	2	3	4	Total
Golden Eagles	0	6	0	0	6
Mustangs	10	17	0	7	34

=== @ Rice ===
	1	2	3	4	Total
Mustangs	7	0	7	0	14
Owls	6	14	3	13	36

=== Tulsa ===
	1	2	3	4	Total
Golden Hurricane	0	6	6	15	27
Mustangs	7	21	7	0	35

=== Fresno State–Hawaii Bowl ===
	1	2	3	4	Total
Bulldogs	0	0	7	3	10
Mustangs	0	22	7	14	43
