= 2012 Marshall Thundering Herd football team =

American college football season

2012 Marshall Thundering Herd football
- Conference: Conference USA
- East Division
- Record: 5–7 (4–4 C-USA)
- Head coach: Doc Holliday (3rd season)
- Offensive coordinator: Bill Legg (3rd season)
- Co-offensive coordinator: Tony Petersen (3rd season)
- Offensive scheme: Spread
- Defensive coordinator: Chris Rippon (3rd season)
- Base defense: 3–4
- Home stadium: Joan C. Edwards Stadium

2012 Conference USA football standings
	Conf.			Overall
Team	W		L	W		L
East Division
UCF xy	7	–	1	10	–	4
East Carolina x	7	–	1	8	–	5
Marshall	4	–	4	5	–	7
Memphis	4	–	4	4	–	8
UAB	2	–	6	3	–	9
Southern Miss	0	–	8	0	–	12
West Division
Tulsa xy$	7	–	1	11	–	3
SMU	5	–	3	7	–	6
Rice	4	–	4	7	–	6
Houston	4	–	4	5	–	7
UTEP	2	–	6	3	–	9
Tulane	2	–	6	2	–	10
Championship: Tulsa 33, UCF 27
$ – Conference champion; x – Division champion/co-champions; y – Championship game participant; Rankings from AP Poll

The 2012 Marshall Thundering Herd football team represented Marshall University in the 2012 NCAA Division I FBS football season. They were led by third-year head coach Doc Holliday and played their home games at Joan C. Edwards Stadium. They are a member of the East Division of Conference USA. They finished the season 5–7, 4–4 in C-USA play to finish in a tie for third place in the East Division.

Marshall closed the season with a 59–65 double-overtime loss to East Carolina.

== Schedule ==
Date	Time	Opponent	Site	TV	Result	Attendance
September 1	12:00 pm	at No. 11 West Virginia*	Mountaineer Field; Morgantown, WV (Friends of Coal Bowl)	FX	L 34–69	59,120
September 8	7:00 pm	Western Carolina*	Joan C. Edwards Stadium; Huntington, WV	FCS	W 52–24	25,317
September 15	6:30 pm	Ohio*	Joan C. Edwards Stadium; Huntington, WV (Battle for the Bell)		L 24–27	33,436
September 22	3:30 pm	at Rice	Rice Stadium; Houston, TX	CSS	W 54–51 ^{2OT}	14,204
September 29	3:30 pm	at Purdue*	Ross–Ade Stadium; West Lafayette, IN	BTN	L 41–51	45,481
October 6	3:30 pm	Tulsa^{†}	Joan C. Edwards Stadium; Huntington, WV	CBSSN	L 38–45	27,189
October 20	7:00 pm	at Southern Miss	M. M. Roberts Stadium; Hattiesburg, MS	CBSSN	W 59–24	24,093
October 27	8:00 pm	UCF	Joan C. Edwards Stadium; Huntington, WV	CBSSN	L 17–54	22,563
November 3	2:00 pm	Memphis	Joan C. Edwards Stadium; Huntington, WV		W 38–28	22,041
November 10	4:30 pm	at UAB	Legion Field; Birmingham, AL	CSS/CSNH	L 31–38	11,981
November 17	12:00 pm	Houston	Joan C. Edwards Stadium; Huntington, WV	CSS/CSNH	W 44–41	18,831
November 23	2:00 pm	at East Carolina	Dowdy–Ficklen Stadium; Greenville, NC (rivalry)	CBSSN	L 59–65 ^{2OT}	46,317
*Non-conference game; ^{†}Homecoming; Rankings from AP Poll released prior to the game; All times are in Eastern time

== Game summaries ==
=== West Virginia ===
	1	2	3	4	Total
Thundering Herd	0	10	10	14	34
#11 Mountaineers	13	21	21	14	69

Marshall and West Virginia last met in 2011 at Morgantown in a game won by WVU 34–13. Marshall is 0–12 all time against West Virginia.

=== Western Carolina ===
	1	2	3	4	Total
Catamounts	0	3	7	14	24
Thundering Herd	3	21	21	7	52

Marshall and Western Carolina last met in 1996 at Huntington in a game won by Marshall 56-21. Marshall is 9-9-2 all time against Western Carolina

=== Ohio ===
	1	2	3	4	Total
Bobcats	0	17	0	10	27
Thundering Herd	14	0	7	3	24

Marshall and Ohio last met in 2011 at Athens in a game won by Ohio 44-7. Marshall is 19-30-6 all time against Ohio.

=== Rice ===
	1	2	3	4	OT	2OT	Total
Thundering Herd	14	7	14	6	7	6	54
Owls	7	7	14	13	7	3	51

Marshall and Rice last met in 2011 at Huntington in a game won by Marshall 24-20. Marshall is 2-1 all time against Rice

=== Purdue ===
	1	2	3	4	Total
Thundering Herd	7	7	14	13	41
Boilermakers	14	28	3	6	51

Marshall and Purdue will meet for the first time in school history.

=== Tulsa ===
	1	2	3	4	Total
Golden Hurricane	10	7	20	8	45
Thundering Herd	3	14	15	6	38

Marshall and Tulsa last met in 2011 at Tulsa in a game won by Tulsa 59–17. Marshall is 0–3 all time against Tulsa. This year's game will be Homecoming.

=== Southern Miss ===
	1	2	3	4	Total
Thundering Herd	10	21	14	14	59
Golden Eagles	3	14	0	7	24

Marshall and Southern Miss last met in 2011 at Huntington in a game won by Marshall 26-20. Marshall is 2-5 all time against Southern Miss.

=== Central Florida ===
	1	2	3	4	Total
Knights	7	20	20	7	54
Thundering Herd	3	7	0	7	17

Marshall and Central Florida last met in 2011 at Orlando in a game won by UCF 16–6. Marshall is 3–7 all time against UCF.

=== Memphis ===
	1	2	3	4	Total
Tigers	0	7	7	14	28
Thundering Herd	10	7	14	7	38

Marshall and Memphis last met in 2011 at Memphis in a game won by Marshall 23–22. Marshall is 5–2 all time against Memphis.

=== UAB ===
	1	2	3	4	Total
Thundering Herd	7	0	7	17	31
Blazers	14	10	7	7	38

Marshall and UAB last met in 2011 at Huntington in a game won by Marshall 59-14. Marshall is 6-1 all time against UAB.

=== Houston ===
	1	2	3	4	Total
Cougars	0	10	14	17	41
Thundering Herd	10	21	7	6	44

Marshall and Houston last met in 2011 at Houston in a game won by Houston 63-28. Marshall is 2-2 all time against Houston

=== East Carolina ===
	1	2	3	4	OT	2OT	Total
Thundering Herd	7	21	7	17	7	0	59
Pirates	14	21	7	10	7	6	65

Marshall and East Carolina last met in 2011 at Huntington in a game won by Marshall 34–27 in overtime. Marshall is 4–9 all time against ECU. This year's game will be on a Friday.
