= 2012 UTEP Miners football team =

American college football season

2012 UTEP Miners football
- Conference: Conference USA
- West Division
- Record: 3–9 (2–6 C-USA)
- Head coach: Mike Price (9th season)
- Offensive coordinator: Aaron Price (1st season)
- Offensive scheme: Spread
- Defensive coordinator: Andre Patterson (3rd season)
- Base defense: 3–4
- Home stadium: Sun Bowl

2012 Conference USA football standings
	Conf.			Overall
Team	W		L	W		L
East Division
UCF xy	7	–	1	10	–	4
East Carolina x	7	–	1	8	–	5
Marshall	4	–	4	5	–	7
Memphis	4	–	4	4	–	8
UAB	2	–	6	3	–	9
Southern Miss	0	–	8	0	–	12
West Division
Tulsa xy$	7	–	1	11	–	3
SMU	5	–	3	7	–	6
Rice	4	–	4	7	–	6
Houston	4	–	4	5	–	7
UTEP	2	–	6	3	–	9
Tulane	2	–	6	2	–	10
Championship: Tulsa 33, UCF 27
$ – Conference champion; x – Division champion/co-champions; y – Championship game participant; Rankings from AP Poll

The 2012 UTEP Miners football team represented the University of Texas at El Paso (UTEP) as a member of the West Division in Conference USA (C-USA) during the 2012 NCAA Division I FCS football season. Led by Mike Price in his ninth and final full season as head coach, the Miners compiled an overall record of 3–9 with a mark of 2–6 in conference play, tying for fifth place at the bottom of the standings in C-USA's West Division. The team played home games at the Sun Bowl in El Paso, Texas.

Price retired at the end of the season. UTEP averaged 29,374 fans per game.

== Schedule ==
Date	Time	Opponent	Site	TV	Result	Attendance
September 1	8:30 pm	No. 4 Oklahoma*	Sun Bowl; El Paso, TX	FSN	L 7–24	40,137
September 8	5:00 pm	at Ole Miss*	Vaught–Hemingway Stadium; Oxford, MS	SECRN	L 10–28	53,133
September 15	6:00 pm	New Mexico State*	Sun Bowl; El Paso, TX (Battle of I-10)		W 41–28	32,933
September 22	10:00 am	at Wisconsin*	Camp Randall Stadium; Madison, WI	ESPN2	L 26–37	79,806
September 29	5:00 pm	at East Carolina	Dowdy–Ficklen Stadium; Greenville, NC	WITN	L 18–28	47,817
October 6	6:00 pm	SMU	Sun Bowl; El Paso, TX	TWCEP	L 0–17	34,073
October 11	6:00 pm	at Tulsa	Skelly Field at H. A. Chapman Stadium; Tulsa, OK	FSN	L 11–33	18,961
October 20	6:00 pm	Tulane^{†}	Sun Bowl; El Paso, TX		W 24–20	23,234
October 27	2:15 pm	at Houston	Robertson Stadium; Houston, TX	CSS, CSNH	L 35–45	27,433
November 10	6:00 pm	UCF	Sun Bowl; El Paso, TX	FCS	L 24–31	25,483
November 17	6:00 pm	at Southern Miss	M. M. Roberts Stadium; Hattiesburg, MS	CBSSN	W 34–33	23,757
November 24	6:00 pm	Rice	Sun Bowl; El Paso, TX	FCS	L 24–33	20,384
*Non-conference game; ^{†}Homecoming; Rankings from AP Poll released prior to the game; All times are in Mountain time

== Game summaries ==
=== No. 4 Oklahoma ===
	1	2	3	4	Total
No. 4 Sooners	7	0	3	14	24
Miners	7	0	0	0	7

=== At Ole Miss ===
	1	2	3	4	Total
Miners	0	0	10	0	10
Rebels	7	14	0	7	28

=== New Mexico State ===
	1	2	3	4	Total
Aggies	0	7	7	14	28
Miners	20	7	7	7	41

=== At Wisconsin ===
	1	2	3	4	Total
Miners	6	3	7	10	26
Badgers	2	21	0	14	37

=== At East Carolina ===
	1	2	3	4	Total
Miners	7	3	0	8	18
Pirates	7	7	7	7	28

=== SMU ===
	1	2	3	4	Total
Mustangs	3	14	0	0	17
Miners	0	0	0	0	0

=== At Tulsa ===
	1	2	3	4	Total
Miners	3	0	0	8	11
Golden Hurricane	3	3	20	7	33

=== Tulane ===
	1	2	3	4	Total
Green Wave	7	10	0	3	20
Miners	7	17	0	0	24

=== At Houston ===
	1	2	3	4	Total
Miners	0	7	7	21	35
Cougars	14	21	10	0	45

=== UCF ===
	1	2	3	4	Total
Knights	7	10	0	14	31
Miners	7	3	0	14	24

=== At Southern Miss ===
	1	2	3	4	Total
Miners	3	17	0	14	34
Golden Eagles	10	7	3	13	33

=== Rice ===
	1	2	3	4	Total
Owls	3	14	3	13	33
Miners	7	7	7	3	24
