= 2012 Rice Owls football team =

American college football season

2012 Rice Owls football

Armed Forces Bowl champion

Armed Forces Bowl, W 33–14 vs. Air Force
- Conference: Conference USA
- West Division
- Record: 7–6 (4–4 C-USA)
- Head coach: David Bailiff (6th season)
- Offensive coordinator: John Reagan (2nd season)
- Offensive scheme: Spread
- Defensive coordinator: Chris Thurmond (1st season)
- Base defense: 4–3
- Home stadium: Rice Stadium

2012 Conference USA football standings
	Conf.			Overall
Team	W		L	W		L
East Division
UCF xy	7	–	1	10	–	4
East Carolina x	7	–	1	8	–	5
Marshall	4	–	4	5	–	7
Memphis	4	–	4	4	–	8
UAB	2	–	6	3	–	9
Southern Miss	0	–	8	0	–	12
West Division
Tulsa xy$	7	–	1	11	–	3
SMU	5	–	3	7	–	6
Rice	4	–	4	7	–	6
Houston	4	–	4	5	–	7
UTEP	2	–	6	3	–	9
Tulane	2	–	6	2	–	10
Championship: Tulsa 33, UCF 27
$ – Conference champion; x – Division champion/co-champions; y – Championship game participant; Rankings from AP Poll

The 2012 Rice Owls football team represented Rice University in the 2012 NCAA Division I FBS football season. They were led by sixth year head coach David Bailiff and played their home games at Rice Stadium. They were a member of the West Division of Conference USA. They finished the season 7–6, 4–4 in C-USA play to finish in a tie for third place in the West Division. They were invited to the Armed Forces Bowl where they defeated Air Force.

== Schedule ==
Date	Time	Opponent	Site	TV	Result	Attendance
August 30	6:30 pm	UCLA*	Rice Stadium; Houston, TX	CBSSN	L 24–49	23,105
September 8	2:30 pm	at Kansas*	Memorial Stadium; Lawrence, KS	FSN	W 25–24	44,683
September 15	6:00 pm	at Louisiana Tech*	Joe Aillet Stadium; Ruston, LA	ESPN3	L 37–56	23,228
September 22	2:30 pm	Marshall	Rice Stadium; Houston, TX	CSS	L 51–54 ^{OT}	14,204
September 29	2:30 pm	vs. Houston	Reliant Stadium; Houston, TX (rivalry)	FSN	L 14–35	32,718
October 6	6:00 pm	at Memphis	Liberty Bowl Memorial Stadium; Memphis, TN	FCS	L 10–14	17,831
October 13	2:30 pm	UTSA*^{†}	Rice Stadium; Houston, TX	FCS	W 34–14	28,677
October 20	2:30 pm	at Tulsa	Chapman Stadium; Tulsa, OK	FSN	L 24–28	22,567
October 27	12:00 pm	Southern Miss	Rice Stadium; Houston, TX	CSS/CSNH	W 44–17	14,927
November 3	2:30 pm	at Tulane	Mercedes-Benz Superdome; New Orleans, LA		W 49–47	15,467
November 17	2:30 pm	SMU	Rice Stadium; Houston, TX (Battle for the Mayor's Cup)	CSS/CSNH	W 36–14	20,710
November 24	6:00 pm	at UTEP	Sun Bowl Stadium; El Paso, TX	FCS	W 33–24	20,384
December 29	10:45 am	vs. Air Force*	Amon G. Carter Stadium; Fort Worth, TX (Armed Forces Bowl)	ESPN	W 33–14	40,754
*Non-conference game; ^{†}Homecoming; All times are in Central time

- Source: Schedule

== Game summaries ==
=== UCLA ===
	1	2	3	4	Total
Bruins	19	16	0	14	49
Owls	10	14	0	0	24

UCLA's Johnathan Franklin rushed for 214 yards and three touchdowns in this rout. UCLA dominated both in the air, with 303 yards passing compared to 184 yards for Rice, and on the ground, with 343 yards rushing compared to 174 for Rice. This was despite Rice having about 8 1/2 minutes more of possession than UCLA. Franklin's performance was 2 yards short of a career high. Quarterback Brett Hundley took the first snap of the game 72 yards for a touchdown. Rice was led by quarterback Taylor McHargue, who was 17 of 28 in passing for 179 yards and one interception; and had 129 yards rushing. In addition, Rice linebacker Cameron Nwosu set an NCAA record, blocking three PATs in the first half.

1st quarter scoring: UCLA – Brett Hundley 72-yard run (K. Fairbairn kick blocked); UCLA – Jerry Johnson 11-yard pass from Hundley (Fairbairn kick blocked); UCLA - Franklin 74-yard run (Fairbairn kick); RICE – Luke Willson 8-yard pass from T. McHargue (Chris Boswell kick); RICE - Boswell 53-yard field goal

2nd quarter scoring: RICE - McHargue 1-yard run (Boswell kick); UCLA – Devin Lucien 27-yard field goal; UCLA - Franklin 78-yard run (Fairbairn kick); RICE – Sam McGuffie 2-yard pass from McHargue (Boswell kick); UCLA – Damien Holmes 44-yard fumble recovery (Fairbairn kick blocked)

4th quarter scoring: UCLA – Joseph Fauria 4-yard pass from Hundley (Hundley pass failed); UCLA - Franklin 22-yard run (David Allen pass from Hundley)

=== @ Kansas ===
	1	2	3	4	Total
Owls	3	10	3	9	25
Jayhawks	10	7	7	0	24

Last meeting was in the 1961 Bluebonnet Bowl.

=== @ Louisiana Tech ===
	1	2	3	4	Total
Owls	0	17	6	14	37
Bulldogs	21	14	7	14	56

=== Marshall ===
	1	2	3	4	OT	2OT	Total
Thundering Herd	14	7	14	6	7	6	54
Owls	7	7	14	13	7	3	51

=== vs Houston ===
	1	2	3	4	Total
Cougars	7	7	14	7	35
Owls	0	0	7	7	14

=== @ Memphis ===
	1	2	3	4	Total
Owls	7	3	0	0	10
Tigers	0	0	14	0	14

=== UTSA ===
	1	2	3	4	Total
Roadrunners	0	3	11	0	14
Owls	6	7	14	7	34

=== @ Tulsa ===
	1	2	3	4	Total
Owls	7	14	0	3	24
Golden Hurricane	7	7	7	7	28

=== Southern Miss ===
	1	2	3	4	Total
Golden Eagles	3	7	7	0	17
Owls	7	14	17	6	44

=== @ Tulane ===
	1	2	3	4	Total
Owls	14	14	7	14	49
Green Wave	7	3	28	9	47

=== SMU ===
	1	2	3	4	Total
Mustangs	7	0	7	0	14
Owls	6	14	3	13	36

=== @ UTEP ===
	1	2	3	4	Total
Owls	3	14	3	13	33
Miners	7	7	7	3	24

=== Air Force–Armed Forces Bowl ===
	1	2	3	4	Total
Owls	7	0	7	19	33
Falcons	0	14	0	0	14
