= Arturo Uzdavinis =

American football player (born 1992)

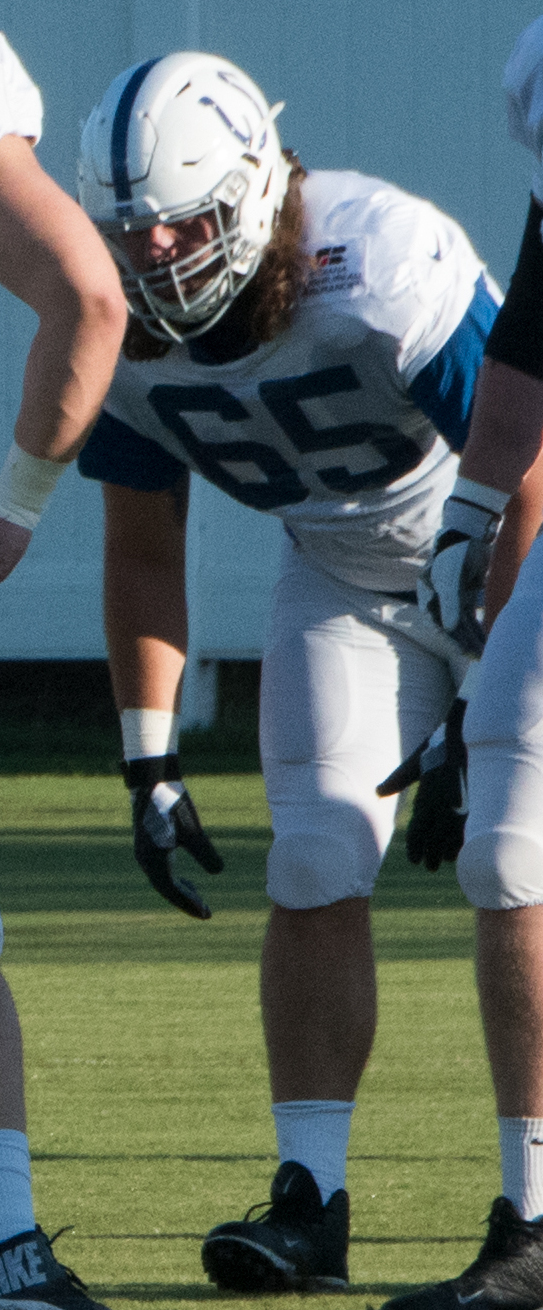
- Uzdavinis at Indianapolis Colts training camp in 2017

No. 67, 68
- Position: Offensive tackle

Personal information
- Born: November 2, 1992 (age 34); Tampa, Florida, U.S.
- Listed height: 6 ft 7 in (2.01 m)
- Listed weight: 305 lb (138 kg)

Career information
- High school: Jesuit (Tampa, Florida)
- College: Tulane
- NFL draft: 2016: undrafted

Career history
- Houston Texans (2016)*; Chicago Bears (2016)*; Jacksonville Jaguars (2016)*; Detroit Lions (2017)*; Minnesota Vikings (2017)*; Indianapolis Colts (2017)*
- * Offseason or practice squad member only
- Stats at Pro Football Reference

Arturo Uzdavinis (born November 2, 1992) is an American former football offensive tackle. He played college football at Tulane. He was signed by the Houston Texans as an undrafted free agent in 2016.

== Early life ==
Uzdavinis attended Jesuit High School in Tampa, Florida, where he lettered once in both football and basketball, the two sports he played. At Jesuit, Uzdavinis played offensive and defensive lines. He was listed as a two-star recruit by both Rivals.com and ESPN. He was also rated by ESPN as the 161st offensive tackle in the nation. He committed to Tulane on December 3, 2010, after visiting the school six days earlier. He later signed his letter of intent.

== College career ==
Uzdavinis attended Tulane University and played for the Tulane program beginning in 2011. After redshirting his freshman year in 2011, Uzdavinis played in all 12 games for Tulane in 2012, with the majority of his playing time coming on special teams. As a redshirt sophomore in 2013, he started all 13 games at left tackle, helping the Green Wave average 310.6 yards per game on offense, a driving force behind Tulane's appearance in the 2013 New Orleans Bowl. As a redshirt junior in 2014, Uzdavinis once again started all 12 games, helping the offense gain 346.8 yards per game. Also as a junior, Uzdavinis was a member of Tulane's 3.0 club, an academic honors club for student-athletes. In his redshirt senior year, Uzdavinis started 11 games for the Green Wave.

Uzdavinis graduated from Tulane with a degree in legal studies.

== Professional career ==
Pre-draft measurables
Height	Weight	Arm length	40-yard dash	20-yard shuttle	Three-cone drill	Vertical jump	Broad jump	Bench press
6 ft 7 in (2.01 m)	316 lb (143 kg)	35 in (0.89 m)	5.36, 5.31 s	4.87 s	7.97 s	35 in (0.89 m)	9 ft 9 in (2.97 m)	16 reps
All values from 2016 Tulane Pro Day

=== Houston Texans ===
On May 6, following the conclusion of the 2016 NFL draft, Uzdavinis signed with the Houston Texans as an undrafted free agent. During the offseason, Uzdavinis attended Houston's rookie minicamp and training camp. On August 29, the Texans waived Uzdavinis due to roster cuts.

=== Chicago Bears ===
On October 24, the Chicago Bears signed Uzdavinis to their practice squad. On November 1, the Bears released Uzdavinis from their practice squad.

=== Jacksonville Jaguars ===
On November 15, 2016, he was signed to the Jaguars' practice squad. He signed a reserve/future contract with the Jaguars on January 2, 2017. On May 1, 2017, he was released by the Jaguars.

=== Detroit Lions ===
On May 15, 2017, Uzdavinis signed with the Detroit Lions. On June 15, 2017, Uzdavinis was waived by the Lions.

=== Minnesota Vikings ===
On July 24, 2017, Uzdavinis signed with the Minnesota Vikings, only to be waived two days later.

=== Indianapolis Colts ===
On August 2, 2017, Uzdavinis was signed by the Indianapolis Colts. He was waived on September 2, 2017.

== Personal life ==
Uzdavinis was born in Tampa, Florida. He is the son of Thomas and Maria Uzdavinis. He has four brothers, Nico, Lucas, Marcos, and Thomas, and a sister named Ana Maria.
