= Bill Blankenship =

American football player and coach (born 1956)

Current position
- Title: Head Coach
- Team: Owasso High School (Owasso, OK)

Biographical details
- Born: December 12, 1956 (age 69); Spiro, Oklahoma, U.S.

Playing career
- 1975–1979: Tulsa
- Position: Quarterback

Coaching career (HC unless noted)
- 1986–1989: Spiro HS (OK)
- 1990–1991: Edmond Memorial HS (OK)
- 1992–2005: Union HS (OK)
- 2007: Tulsa (WR)
- 2008: Tulsa (ST)
- 2009–2010: Tulsa (ST/RB)
- 2011–2014: Tulsa
- 2016: Fayetteville HS (AR)
- 2017–2023: Owasso HS (OK)
- 2025–present: Owasso HS (OK)

Head coaching record
- Overall: 24–27 (college); 275–86 (high school)
- Bowls: 1–1

Accomplishments and honors

Championships
- 1 C-USA (2012); 1 C-USA West Division (2012); 5 OSSAA State Championships (2002, 2004, 2005 2017, 2019); 1 AAA State Championship (2016)

Awards
- C-USA Coach of the Year (2012)

Bill Blankenship (born December 12, 1956) is an American football coach and former player. He is the head high school football coach at Owasso High School in Owasso, OK.

He was the head coach of the University of Tulsa Golden Hurricane from 2011 through 2014. Before entering the college ranks, Blankenship was a successful high school coach for over 20 years, with most of his success happening at Union High School in Tulsa, OK. He was named to the Oklahoma Coaches Association Hall of Fame in 2009.

== Playing career ==
Blankenship played for the University of Tulsa Golden Hurricane beginning in 1975 and served two stints as starting quarterback, 1977 and 1979. While there, Blankenship played in the 1976 Independence Bowl.

== High School Coaching career ==
Blankenship's high school head coaching career in Oklahoma included stints at Edmond Memorial High School, Union High School, Fayetteville High School, and Owasso High School.

=== Union High School ===
Blankenship served as the coach of Tulsa's Union High School for 14 years until 2005. There he compiled an overall 154-26 record. During his tenure, Union won eight consecutive district championships, qualified for the playoffs fourteen times, reached the quarterfinals ten times, participated in the state Class 6A championship seven times, and won the state title in 2002, 2004, and 2005. Union also amassed an unbroken home winning streak of 56 straight wins between the years 1997 and 2005.

=== Fayetteville High School ===
On June 7, 2016, it was announced that Blankenship had accepted the vacant head coaching position at Fayetteville, a Class 7A program in Arkansas. In his only season at the school, he led Fayetteville to the Class 7A Arkansas state title.

=== Owasso High School ===
On January 6, 2017, it was announced that Blankenship had accepted the vacant head coaching position at Owasso High School, a Class 6A-I program in Owasso, Oklahoma. Owasso went on to win the Class 6A-1 Oklahoma State Championship by defeating Union High School 21-14, breaking the 21-year Union-Jenks streak. In 2021, Blankenship led Owasso to an 8-3 record before losing to Broken Arrow High School, 41-40. In December 2023, Blankenship announced his decision to retire from coaching after seven seasons with Owasso.

In December 2024, after a season away from Owasso High School, it was announced that Blankenship will be returning as the school's head high school football coach.

== College Coaching career ==
=== University of Tulsa ===
In 2005 Blankenship decided that he wanted to pursue seriously his goal of coaching at the college level. Days after winning his third state title in four years, he resigned as Union's head coach (and, later, as its athletic director). At the time, Blankenship said that he was resigning, in part, because otherwise potential employers would not believe he would be willing to leave his successful position at Union. He spent the following year out of coaching, and then accepted Tulsa Golden Hurricane head coach Todd Graham's offer to become receivers coach at Tulsa. After the 2010 season, Graham left Tulsa to become the head coach at Pitt. After a brief search, Blankenship was named Tulsa's new head coach on January 14, 2011. Blankenship's first two seasons as head coach were marked by success, including a conference championship and Liberty Bowl victory in 2012. But over the next two seasons, Tulsa won a total of only five games, and Tulsa fired Blankenship on December 1, 2014.

== Personal life ==
Blankenship and his wife Angie are the parents of three sons: Josh, Caleb, and Adam, all of whom played football in high school and college. Josh Blankenship played quarterback at Tulsa before transferring to Eastern Washington, where he was a second-team Division I-AA All-American. He later played arena football, including three years as quarterback of the Tulsa Talons; after working as an assistant coach at Union and elsewhere, in December 2010 he was named head coach at Muskogee High School. Caleb Blankenship played tight end for four years at Tulsa, and was named to the John Mackey Award watch list his senior year, awarded to the Best Collegiate Tight End in Division I-A. Adam Blankenship played at Nebraska and Illinois State, was an assistant coach at Union, and in 2011 joined his father's new coaching staff at Tulsa.

== Head coaching record ==
=== College ===
Year	Team	Overall	Conference	Standing	Bowl/playoffs	Coaches^{#}	AP^{°}
Tulsa Golden Hurricane (Conference USA) (2011–2013)
2011	Tulsa	8–5	7–1	2nd (West)	L Armed Forces		
2012	Tulsa	11–3	7–1	1st (West)	W Liberty	25	
2013	Tulsa	3–9	2–6	6th (West)			
Tulsa Golden Hurricane (American Athletic Conference) (2014)
2014	Tulsa	2–10	2–6	T–8th			
Tulsa:		24–27	18–14				
Total:		24–27					
National championship Conference title Conference division title or championship game berth
^{#}Rankings from final Coaches Poll.; ^{°}Rankings from final AP Poll.

== Awards ==
- Merv Johnson Integrity in College Coaching Award, Oklahoma Chapter of the National Football Foundation and College Hall of Fame (2008).
- Oklahoma Coaches Association Hall of Fame inductee, 2009.
- Conference USA Coach of the Year, 2012.
