= Houston Cougars football statistical leaders =

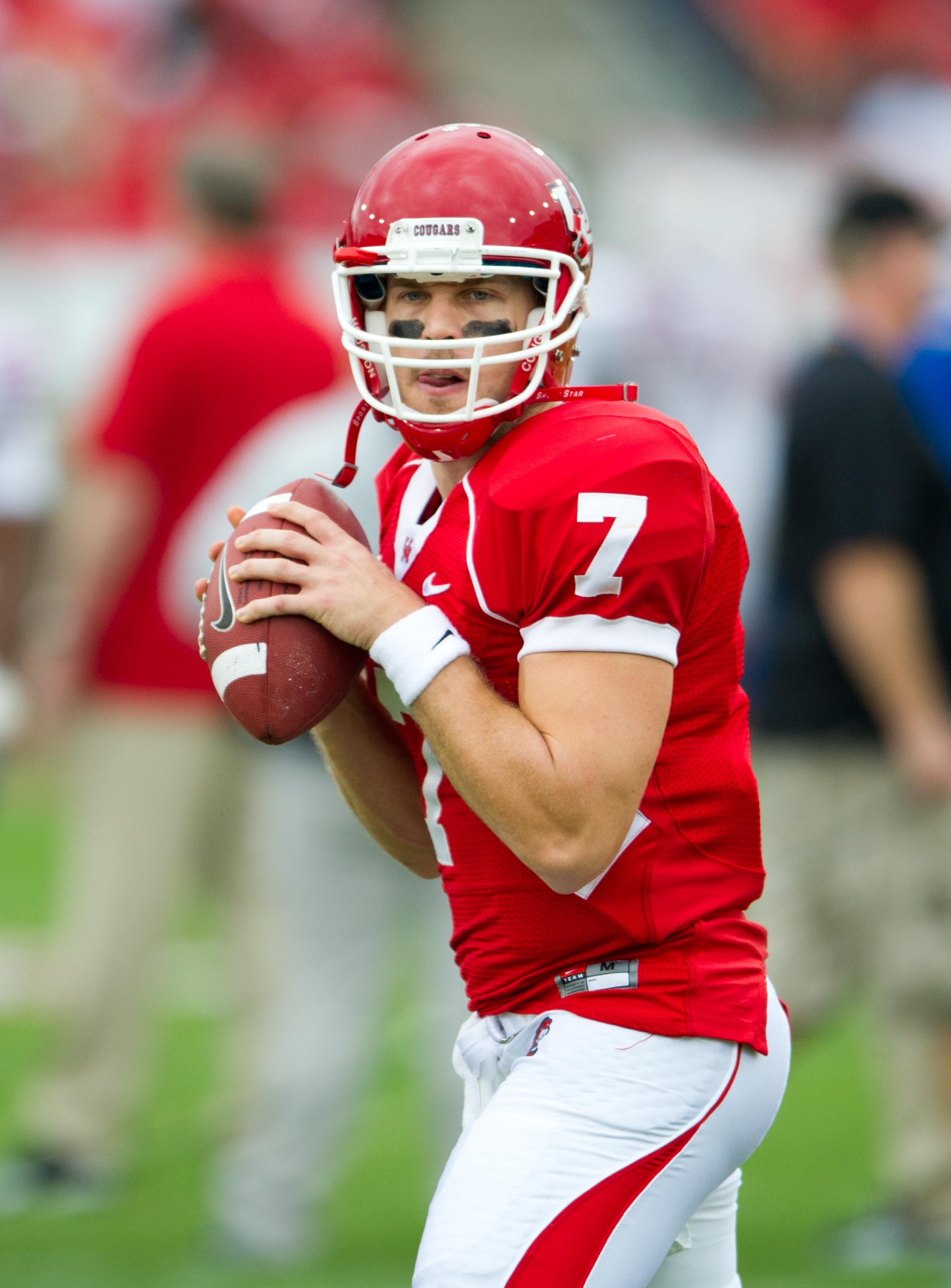
Case Keenum holds not only Houston records, but the passing yards, passing touchdowns, and total offense records across all of college football.

The Houston Cougars football statistical leaders are individual statistical leaders of the Houston Cougars football program in various categories, including passing, rushing, receiving, total offense, defensive stats, and kicking. Within those areas, the lists identify single-game, single-season, and career leaders. The Cougars represent the University of Houston in the NCAA Division I FBS Big 12 Conference.

Houston began competing in intercollegiate football in 1946, but these lists are dominated by more recent players for several reasons:

- Since 1946, regular seasons have increased from 10 games to 11 and then 12 games in length.
- The NCAA didn't allow freshmen to play varsity football until 1972 (with the exception of the World War II years), allowing players to have four-year careers.
- Bowl games only began counting toward single-season and career statistics in 2002. The Cougars have played in 16 bowl games since then, allowing recent players an extra game to accumulate statistics. Similarly, the Cougars played in the Conference USA Championship Game three times and the AAC Championship Game twice, so players in those seasons played 14 games.
- Houston has recently run a spread offense under coaches Art Briles, Kevin Sumlin, Tony Levine, Tom Herman, Major Applewhite, and Dana Holgorsen, allowing offensive players to accumulate many yards and touchdowns. Most notably among these is quarterback Case Keenum, who holds the records for passing yards, passing touchdowns, and total offense across all of college football.

These lists are updated through Week 12 of the 2026 season. Active players are listed in bold.

== Passing ==
=== Passing yards ===
Career
Rank	Player	Yards	Years
1	Case Keenum	19,217	2007 2008 2009 2010 2011
2	Kevin Kolb	12,964	2003 2004 2005 2006
3	Clayton Tune	11,991	2018 2019 2020 2021 2022
4	David Klingler	9,430	1988 1989 1990 1991
5	Greg Ward Jr.	8,705	2013 2014 2015 2016
6	Jason McKinley	8,694	1997 1998 1999 2000
7	Andre Ware	8,202	1987 1988 1989
8	Chuck Clements	7,112	1993 1994 1995 1996
9	David Piland	5,790	2010 2012 2013
10	**Conner Weigman**	5,257	2025 2026

Single season
Rank	Player	Yards	Year
1	Case Keenum	5,671	2009
2	Case Keenum	5,631	2011
3	David Klingler	5,140	1990
4	Case Keenum	5,020	2008
5	Andre Ware	4,699	1989
6	Clayton Tune	4,069	2022
7	Jimmy Klingler	3,818	1992
8	Kevin Kolb	3,809	2006
9	Greg Ward Jr.	3,557	2016
10	Clayton Tune	3,546	2021

Single game
Rank	Player	Yards	Year	Opponent
1	David Klingler	716	1990	Arizona State
2	Jimmy Klingler	613	1992	Rice
3	David Piland	580	2012	Louisiana Tech
4	David Klingler	572	1990	Eastern Washington
5	David Klingler	563	1990	TCU
6	Case Keenum	559	2009	Southern Miss
7	Case Keenum	536	2009	UTEP
8	Case Keenum	534	2011	Rice
9	David Klingler	533	1991	Texas Tech
10	Case Keenum	532	2011	Penn State

=== Passing touchdowns ===
Career
Rank	Player	TDs	Years
1	Case Keenum	155	2007 2008 2009 2010 2011
2	Clayton Tune	104	2018 2019 2020 2021 2022
3	David Klingler	91	1988 1989 1990 1991
4	Kevin Kolb	85	2003 2004 2005 2006
5	Andre Ware	75	1987 1988 1989
6	Greg Ward Jr.	52	2013 2014 2015 2016
7	D'Eriq King	50	2016 2017 2018 2019
	**Conner Weigman**	50	2025 2026
9	Jason McKinley	46	1997 1998 1999 2000
10	Chuck Clements	43	1993 1994 1995 1996

Single season
Rank	Player	TDs	Year
1	David Klingler	54	1990
2	Case Keenum	48	2011
3	Andre Ware	46	1989
4	Case Keenum	44	2008
	Case Keenum	44	2009
6	Clayton Tune	40	2022
7	D'Eriq King	36	2018
8	Jimmy Klingler	32	1992
9	Kevin Kolb	30	2006
	Clayton Tune	30	2021

Single game
Rank	Player	TDs	Year	Opponent
1	David Klingler	11	1990	Eastern Washington
2	David Klingler	9	1991	Louisiana Tech
	Case Keenum	9	2011	Rice
4	Andre Ware	7	1989	Temple
	David Klingler	7	1990	Arizona State
	David Klingler	7	1990	Arkansas
	David Klingler	7	1990	TCU
	Jimmy Klingler	7	1992	Rice
	Clayton Tune	7	2022	SMU
10	Andre Ware	6	1989	Baylor
	Andre Ware	6	1989	SMU
	Andre Ware	6	1989	TCU
	Case Keenum	6	2008	Tulsa
	Case Keenum	6	2011	Marshall

== Rushing ==
=== Rushing yards ===
Career
Rank	Player	Yards	Years
1	Ketric Sanford	3,636	1996 1997 1998 1999
2	Chuck Weatherspoon	3,247	1987 1988 1989 1990
3	Bryce Beall	3,098	2008 2009 2010 2011
4	Kenneth Farrow	2,975	2012 2013 2014 2015
5	Robert Newhouse	2,961	1969 1970 1971
6	Joffrey Reynolds	2,947	1999 2000 2001 2002
7	Paul Gipson	2,769	1966 1967 1968
8	Anthony Alridge	2,595	2005 2006 2007
9	Alois Blackwell	2,467	1975 1976 1977
10	Greg Ward Jr.	2,375	2013 2014 2015 2016

Single season
Rank	Player	Yards	Year
1	Robert Newhouse	1,757	1971
2	Anthony Alridge	1,597	2007
3	Paul Gipson	1,550	1968
4	Joffrey Reynolds	1,545	2002
5	Jim Strong	1,293	1969
6	Bryce Beall	1,247	2008
7	Antowain Smith	1,239	1996
8	Nat "Puddin" Jones	1,216	1972
9	Ketric Sanford	1,199	1999
10	Alois Blackwell	1,169	1977

Single game
Rank	Player	Yards	Year	Opponent
1	Joffrey Reynolds	300	2002	East Carolina
2	Paul Gipson	282	1968	Tulsa
	Anthony Evans	282	2004	Army
4	Robert Newhouse	245	1969	Mississippi State
5	Robert Newhouse	237	1971	Cincinnati
6	Antowain Smith	231	1996	Southern Miss
7	Paul Gipson	230	1968	Georgia
	Jim Strong	230	1969	Arizona
9	Paul Gipson	229	1967	Georgia
10	Sloan Hood	226	1985	TCU

=== Rushing touchdowns ===
Career
Rank	Player	TDs	Years
1	Bryce Beall	39	2008 2009 2010 2011
	Greg Ward Jr.	39	2013 2014 2015 2016
3	Kenneth Farrow	34	2012 2013 2014 2015
4	Jackie Battle	31	2003 2004 2005 2006
5	Charles Sims	29	2009 2011 2012
6	Ketric Sanford	28	1996 1997 1998 1999
	D'Eriq King	28	2016 2017 2018 2019
8	Chuck Weatherspoon	27	1987 1988 1989 1990
9	Paul Gipson	25	1966 1967 1968
10	Gene Shannon	23	1949 1950 1951
	Joffrey Reynolds	23	1999 2000 2001 2002
	Case Keenum	23	2007 2008 2009 2010 2011

Single season
Rank	Player	TDs	Year
1	Greg Ward Jr.	21	2015
2	Alton McCaskill	16	2021
3	Jackie Battle	15	2006
4	Antowain Smith	14	1996
	Anthony Alridge	14	2007
	Kenneth Farrow	14	2014
	D'Eriq King	14	2018
8	Paul Gipson	13	1968
	Bryce Beall	13	2008
10	Robert Newhouse	12	1971
	Leonard Parker	12	1973
	Ketric Sanford	12	1999
	Bryce Beall	12	2010
	Kenneth Farrow	12	2015

Single game
Rank	Player	TDs	Year	Opponent
1	Antowain Smith	5	1996	Southern Miss
2	Joffrey Reynolds	4	2002	East Carolina
	Anthony Alridge	4	2007	Rice
	Bryce Beall	4	2010	Tulane
	Kenneth Farrow	4	2014	Tulsa
	Greg Ward Jr.	4	2015	SMU

== Receiving ==
=== Receptions ===
Career
Rank	Player	Rec	Years
1	Tyron Carrier	320	2008 2009 2010 2011
2	Patrick Edwards	291	2008 2009 2010 2011
3	Vincent Marshall	272	2003 2004 2005 2006
4	Nathaniel Dell	228	2020 2021 2022
5	Orlando Iglesias	222	1997 1998 1999 2000
6	Manny Hazard	220	1989 1990
7	Donnie Avery	210	2004 2005 2006 2007
8	Jason Phillips	207	1987 1988
9	Linell Bonner	203	2015 2016 2017
10	Deontay Greenberry	201	2012 2013 2014

Single season
Rank	Player	Rec	Year
1	Manny Hazard	142	1989
2	Nathaniel Dell	109	2022
3	Jason Phillips	108	1988
4	Freddie Gilbert	106	1991
5	James Cleveland	104	2009
6	Sherman Smith	103	1992
7	James Dixon	102	1988
8	Jason Phillips	99	1987
9	Demarcus Ayers	98	2015
	Linell Bonner	98	2016

Single game
Rank	Player	Rec	Year	Opponent
1	Manny Hazard	19	1989	TCU
	Manny Hazard	19	1989	Texas
	James Cleveland	19	2009	East Carolina
4	Jason Phillips	16	1988	Louisiana Tech
	Manny Hazard	16	1989	Arizona State
	Freddie Gilbert	16	1991	Miami (FL)
	Freddie Gilbert	16	1991	Texas Tech
8	Jason Phillips	15	1987	TCU
	James Dixon	15	1988	Rice
	Sherman Smith	15	1992	SMU
	Brian Robinson	15	2000	Army

=== Receiving yards ===
Career
Rank	Player	Yards	Years
1	Patrick Edwards	4,507	2008 2009 2010 2011
2	Vincent Marshall	3,770	2006 2007 2008 2009
3	Tyron Carrier	3,493	2008 2009 2010 2011
4	Elmo Wright	3,347	1968 1969 1970
5	Donnie Avery	3,289	2004 2005 2006 2007
6	Nathaniel Dell	3,155	2020 2021 2022
7	Brandon Middleton	2,873	1999 2000 2001 2002 2003
8	Orlando Iglesias	2,810	1997 1998 1999 2000 2001
9	Manny Hazard	2,635	1989 1990
10	Deontay Greenberry	2,612	2012 2013 2014

Single season
Rank	Player	Yards	Year
1	Patrick Edwards	1,752	2011
2	Manny Hazard	1,689	1989
3	Donnie Avery	1,456	2007
4	Jason Phillips	1,444	1988
5	Nathaniel Dell	1,398	2022
6	Nathaniel Dell	1,329	2021
7	Elmo Wright	1,275	1969
8	Marcus Grant	1,262	1991
9	Brandon Middleton	1,250	2003
10	Justin Johnson	1,229	2011

Single game
Rank	Player	Yards	Year	Opponent
1	Donnie Avery	346	2007	Rice
2	Patrick Edwards	318	2011	Rice
3	Elmo Wright	262	1969	Wyoming
4	Paul Smith	255	1989	SMU
5	Elmo Wright	249	1968	Idaho
6	Elmo Wright	244	1968	Cincinnati
7	James Cleveland	241	2009	East Carolina
8	Brandon Middleton	232	2003	TCU
9	Robert Ford	231	1972	San Diego State
10	Patrick Edwards	228	2011	Penn State

=== Receiving touchdowns ===
Career
Rank	Player	TDs	Years
1	Patrick Edwards	43	2008 2009 2010 2011
2	Elmo Wright	34	1968 1969 1970
3	Nathaniel Dell	32	2020 2021 2022
4	Manny Hazard	31	1989 1990
5	Vincent Marshall	26	2006 2007 2008 2009
6	Brandon Middleton	24	1999 2000 2001 2002 2003
7	Ken Hebert	22	1965 1966 1967
	Tyron Carrier	22	2008 2009 2010 2011
	Marquez Stevenson	22	2016 2018 2019 2020
	**Amare Thomas**	22	2025 2026

Single season
Rank	Player	TDs	Year
1	Manny Hazard	22	1989
2	Patrick Edwards	20	2011
3	Nathaniel Dell	17	2022
4	Jason Phillips	15	1988
5	Elmo Wright	14	1969
	Brandon Middleton	14	2003
	James Cleveland	14	2009
8	Patrick Edwards	13	2010
9	Justin Johnson	12	2011
	Nathaniel Dell	12	2021
	Amare Thomas	12	2025

Single game
Rank	Player	TDs	Year	Opponent
1	Manny Hazard	5	1989	Baylor
	Patrick Edwards	5	2011	Rice
3	Ken Hebert	4	1966	Tampa
	Elmo Wright	4	1968	Idaho
	Elmo Wright	4	1969	Wyoming
	Don Bass	4	1976	TCU
	Jason Phillips	4	1988	Texas
	Patrick Edwards	4	2011	Tulsa
	Patrick Overmyer	4	2026	Kansas State

== Total offense ==
Total offense is the sum of passing and rushing statistics. It does not include receiving or returns.

=== Total offense yards ===
Career
Rank	Player	Yards	Years
1	Case Keenum	20,114	2007 2008 2009 2010 2011
2	Kevin Kolb	13,715	2003 2004 2005 2006
3	Clayton Tune	13,244	2018 2019 2020 2021 2022
4	Greg Ward Jr.	11,080	2013 2014 2015 2016
5	David Klingler	9,327	1988 1989 1990 1991
6	Jason McKinley	8,277	1997 1998 1999 2000
7	Andre Ware	8,058	1987 1988 1989
8	Chuck Clements	6,893	1993 1994 1995 1996
9	D'Eriq King	6,346	2016 2017 2018 2019
10	**Conner Weigman**	6,265	2025 2026

Single season
Rank	Player	Yards	Year
1	Case Keenum	5,829	2009
2	Case Keenum	5,666	2011
3	Case Keenum	5,241	2008
4	David Klingler	5,221	1990
5	Andre Ware	4,631	1989
6	Clayton Tune	4,615	2022
7	Greg Ward Jr.	4,075	2016
8	Kevin Kolb	3,963	2006
9	Greg Ward Jr.	3,936	2015
10	Jimmy Klingler	3,768	1992

Single game
Rank	Player	Yards	Year	Opponent
1	David Klingler	732	1990	Arizona State
2	Clayton Tune	638	2022	SMU
3	David Klingler	625	1990	TCU
4	Jimmy Klingler	612	1992	Rice
5	David Piland	584	2012	Louisiana Tech
6	David Klingler	578	1990	Eastern Washington
	Kevin Kolb	578	2003	TCU
8	Case Keenum	569	2009	Southern Miss
9	Greg Ward Jr.	552	2016	Memphis
10	D'Eriq King	551	2018	South Florida

=== Touchdowns responsible for ===
"Touchdowns responsible for" is the NCAA's official term for combined passing and rushing touchdowns.

Career
Rank	Player	TDs	Years
1	Case Keenum	178	2007 2008 2009 2010 2011
2	Clayton Tune	119	2018 2019 2020 2021 2022
3	Kevin Kolb	106	2003 2004 2005 2006
4	David Klingler	93	1988 1989 1990 1991
5	Greg Ward Jr.	91	2013 2014 2015 2016
6	Andre Ware	81	1987 1988 1989
7	D'Eriq King	78	2016 2017 2018 2019
8	**Conner Weigman**	68	2025 2026
9	Gary Mullins	52	1969 1970 1971
10	Jason McKinley	47	1997 1998 1999 2000

Single season
Rank	Player	TDs	Year
1	David Klingler	55	1990
2	Case Keenum	51	2008
	Case Keenum	51	2011
4	D'Eriq King	50	2018
5	Andre Ware	49	1989
6	Case Keenum	48	2009
7	Clayton Tune	45	2022
8	Greg Ward Jr.	38	2015
9	Conner Weigman	36	2025
10	Kevin Kolb	34	2006

Single game
Rank	Player	TDs	Year	Opponent
1	David Klingler	11	1990	Eastern Washington
2	David Klingler	9	1991	Louisiana Tech
	Case Keenum	9	2011	Rice
4	Clayton Tune	8	2022	SMU
5	Andre Ware	7	1989	Temple
	David Klingler	7	1990	Arkansas
	David Klingler	7	1990	TCU
	David Klingler	7	1990	Arizona State
	Jimmy Klingler	7	1992	Rice
	Case Keenum	7	2008	Tulsa
	D'Eriq King	7	2018	South Florida

== Defense ==
=== Interceptions ===
Career
Rank	Player	Ints	Years
1	Adrian McDonald	17	2012 2013 2014 2015
2	Cornelius Price	16	1989 1990
3	Gus Hollomon	14	1965 1966 1967
	Anthony Francis	14	1975 1976 1977
	Johnnie Jackson	14	1986 1987 1988
6	Will Gulley	13	2002 2003 2004 2006
7	Paul Shires	12	1966 1967 1968
	Calvin Eason	12	1980 1981 1982
	Trevon Stewart	12	2012 2013 2014 2015

Single season
Rank	Player	Ints	Year
1	Cornelius Price	12	1989
2	Byron Beaver	10	1962
	Paul Shires	10	1968
	Anthony Francis	10	1976
5	L.D. Rowden	8	1969
	Johnnie Jackson	8	1987
	Jerry Parks	8	1990
8	Butch LaCroix	7	1981
	Mike James	7	1999

Single game
Rank	Player	Ints	Year	Opponent
1	Byron Beaver	5	1962	Baylor
2	Jack Howton	4	1952	Texas Tech
3	Ken Bolin	3	1961	Boston College
	Tom Paciorek	3	1966	Florida State
	Paul Shires	3	1968	Memphis
	Bill Jones	3	1973	Virginia Tech
	Donnie Love	3	1979	Texas A&M
	Johnnie Jackson	3	1987	Texas
	Will Gulley	3	2004	East Carolina
	Loyce Means	3	2008	Tulsa

=== Tackles ===
Career
Rank	Player	Tackles	Years
1	Marcus McGraw	510	2008 2009 2010 2011
2	Ryan McCoy	507	1993 1994 1995 1996
3	Gary McGuire	472	1984 1985 1986 1987
4	Hanik Milligan	411	2000 2001 2002
5	Derrick Mathews	400	2011 2012 2013 2014
6	Mike Parker	391	1994 1995 1996 1997
7	Phillip Steward	378	2009 2010 2011 2012
8	David Hodge	376	1975 1976 1978 1979
9	Trevon Stewart	367	2012 2013 2014 2015
10	Greg Brezina	350	1965 1966 1967

Single season
Rank	Player	Tackles	Year
1	Frank Ditta	177	1970
2	Hanik Milligan	174	2001
3	Bryant Winn	167	1984
4	Gary McGuire	163	1986
5	Ryan McCoy	157	1993
6	Marcus McGraw	156	2009
7	Gary McGuire	155	1985
8	Gary McGuire	148	1987
	Hanik Milligan	148	2002
10	Kenny Hill	143	1999
	C.J. Cavness	143	2009

Single game
Rank	Player	Tackles	Year	Opponent
1	Frank Ditta	26	1971	Arizona State
2	Deryl McGallion	23	1972	TCU
	Gary McGuire	23	1987	Virginia Tech
	Marcus McGraw	23	2009	Air Force
5	Richard Harrington	22	1970	Syracuse
	Weedy Harris	22	1982	Arkansas
	Hanik Milligan	22	2001	TCU
8	Ryan McCoy	21	1993	Baylor
	Rocky Schwartz	21	2005	UCF
	Trevon Stewart	21	2012	East Carolina
	Austin Robinson	21	2018	Navy

=== Sacks ===
Career
Rank	Player	Sacks	Years
1	Phillip Hunt	34.0	2005 2006 2007 2008
2	Mack Mitchell	33.0	1972 1973 1974
3	T. J. Turner	30.0	1982 1983 1984 1985
4	Hosea Taylor	26.0	1977 1978 1979 1980
5	Steven Taylor	25.5	2013 2014 2015 2016
6	Leonard Mitchell	22.0	1977 1978 1979 1980
7	Tyus Bowser	21.5	2013 2014 2015 2016
8	Larry Keller	21.0	1972 1973 1974
	Glenn Montgomery	21.0	1985 1986 1987 1988
	Sammy Brown	21.0	2010 2011

Single season
Rank	Player	Sacks	Year
1	Phillip Hunt	14.0	2008
2	Sammy Brown	13.5	2011
3	Mack Mitchell	13.0	1973
	Craig Veasey	13.0	1989
5	Sam Proctor	12.0	1979
	Glenn Montgomery	12.0	1988
	Reggie Burnette	12.0	1990
	Glenn Cadrez	12.0	1991
9	Mack Mitchell	11.0	1974
	T. J. Turner	11.0	1984
	Phillip Steward	11.0	2012

Single game
Rank	Player	Sacks	Year	Opponent
1	Glenn Montgomery	6.0	1988	Wyoming
2	Reggie Burnette	5.0	1990	SMU
3	Derek Parish	4.5	2022	Texas Tech

== Kicking ==
=== Field goals made ===
Career
Rank	Player	FGs	Years
1	Roman Anderson	70	1988 1989 1990 1991
2	Matt Hogan	59	2009 2010 2011 2012
3	Dalton Witherspoon	51	2018 2019 2020 2021
4	Mike Clendenen	41	1981 1982 1983 1984
5	Dustin Bell	39	2001 2002 2003 2004
6	Chip Browndyke	37	1985 1986 1987
7	Ben Bell	34	2005 2006 2007 2008 2009
8	Sebastian Villarreal	31	1995 1996 1997
9	Kyle Bullard	27	2013 2014 2015
10	Mike Clark	24	1999 2000
	Ty Cummings	24	2013 2014 2015 2016

Single season
Rank	Player	FGs	Year
1	Roman Anderson	22	1989
2	Ethan Sanchez	21	2025
3	Matt Hogan	20	2012
	Dalton Witherspoon	20	2019
5	Chip Browndyke	19	1987
	Roman Anderson	19	1988
	Roman Anderson	19	1990
8	Mike Clendenen	18	1984
9	Sebastian Villarreal	16	1997
	Kyle Bullard	16	2014
	Ty Cummings	16	2016
	Dalton Witherspoon	16	2021

Single game
Rank	Player	FGs	Year	Opponent
1	Matt Hogan	6	2012	UAB
2	Mike Clendenen	5	1983	Texas Tech
	Mike Clendenen	5	1984	SMU
	Richie Leone	5	2013	Temple
	Ethan Sanchez	5	2025	Colorado
6	Matt Hogan	4	2009	Tulsa
	Matt Hogan	4	2012	Tulane
	Kyle Bullard	4	2014	Grambling
	Kyle Bullard	4	2014	UCF
	Ty Cummings	4	2016	Oklahoma
	Ethan Sanchez	4	2025	Oklahoma State

=== Field goal percentage ===
Career (at least 20 FGA)
Rank	Player	FG%	Years
1	Ty Cummings	85.7%	2013 2014 2015 2016
2	Matt Hogan	83.1%	2009 2010 2011 2012
3	Ethan Sanchez	80.8%	2025
4	Dalton Witherspoon	76.1%	2018 2019 2020 2021
5	Kyle Bullard	73.0%	2013 2014 2015
6	Chip Browndyke	71.2%	1985 1986 1987
7	Dustin Bell	70.9%	2001 2002 2003 2004
8	Ben Bell	70.8%	2005 2006 2008 2009
9	Sebastian Villarreal	70.5%	1995 1996 1997
10	Mike Clendenen	69.5%	1981 1982 1983 1984

Single season (at least 10 FGA)
Rank	Player	FG%	Year
1	Matt Hogan	100.0%	2009
2	Dustin Bell	85.7%	2002
3	Dalton Witherspoon	83.3%	2019
4	Matt Hogan	82.4%	2010
5	Mike Clendenen	81.8%	1984
6	Ethan Sanchez	80.8%	2025
7	Matt Hogan	80.0%	2012
	Ty Cummings	80.0%	2016
	Caden Novikoff	80.0%	2017
	Dalton Witherspoon	80.0%	2020
	Jack Martin	80.0%	2024
