= 2012 Houston Cougars football team =

American college football season

2012 Houston Cougars football
- Conference: Conference USA
- West Division
- Record: 5–7 (4–4 C-USA)
- Head coach: Tony Levine (1st season)
- Offensive coordinator: Mike Nesbitt (1st season; game 1); Travis Bush (interim; remainder of season)
- Offensive scheme: Air raid
- Defensive coordinator: Jamie Bryant (1st season)
- Base defense: 4–3
- Home stadium: Robertson Stadium

2012 Conference USA football standings
	Conf.			Overall
Team	W		L	W		L
East Division
UCF xy	7	–	1	10	–	4
East Carolina x	7	–	1	8	–	5
Marshall	4	–	4	5	–	7
Memphis	4	–	4	4	–	8
UAB	2	–	6	3	–	9
Southern Miss	0	–	8	0	–	12
West Division
Tulsa xy$	7	–	1	11	–	3
SMU	5	–	3	7	–	6
Rice	4	–	4	7	–	6
Houston	4	–	4	5	–	7
UTEP	2	–	6	3	–	9
Tulane	2	–	6	2	–	10
Championship: Tulsa 33, UCF 27
$ – Conference champion; x – Division champion/co-champions; y – Championship game participant; Rankings from AP Poll

The 2012 Houston Cougars football team represented the University of Houston in the 2012 NCAA Division I FBS football season. It was the 67th year of season play for Houston. The season marked the last for the Cougars as a member of Conference USA as they moved to the American Athletic Conference in 2013. In addition, it was the final season for the team to host its home games at Robertson Stadium as the university announced plans to begin construction on TDECU Stadium in December 2012—following the conclusion of the season. The 2012 season was the first full season under head coach Tony Levine as he took over for Kevin Sumlin after his departure following the 2011 Conference USA Football Championship Game.

At one time it was believed that the 2012 season would be the last for the foreseeable future with a Bayou Bucket Classic matchup against the Rice Owls. Both teams had relied on the game being on their respective conference schedules. However, with the American Athletic Conference move in 2013 for the Cougars, the matchup would have had to have been scheduled as a non-conference game. At the time of the Big East Conference announcement, Rice had its non-conference schedule completely booked for the 2013 and 2014 seasons. In April 2012, the two schools announced that they had come to an agreement to extend the series through the 2013 season. The 2012 and 2013 Bayou Bucket Classics were hosted at Reliant Stadium.

== Pre-season ==
=== Recruits ===
College recruiting information (2012)
Name	Hometown	School	Height	Weight	40^{‡}	Commit date
Jacob Abels; OG	Sugar Land, Texas	Austin HS	6 ft 5 in (1.96 m)	290 lb (130 kg)	N/A	Apr 9, 2011
Jacob Abels; OG	Recruit ratings: Scout: Rivals: ESPN: (75)					
Steven Aikens; OLB	Arlington, Texas	Seguin HS	6 ft 2 in (1.88 m)	200 lb (91 kg)	N/A	Mar 28, 2011
Steven Aikens; OLB	Recruit ratings: Scout: Rivals: ESPN: (70)					
Rex Dausin; QB	San Antonio, Texas	Warren HS	6 ft 3 in (1.91 m)	178 lb (81 kg)	4.70	Jan 28, 2012
Rex Dausin; QB	Recruit ratings: Scout: Rivals: ESPN: (NR)					
Deontay Greenberry; WR	Fresno, California	Washington Union HS	6 ft 3 in (1.91 m)	184 lb (83 kg)	4.50	Jan 29, 2012
Deontay Greenberry; WR	Recruit ratings: Scout: Rivals: ESPN: (80)					
Blake Herman; OT	Needville, Texas	Needville HS	6 ft 7 in (2.01 m)	290 lb (130 kg)	5.10	Mar 9, 2011
Blake Herman; OT	Recruit ratings: Scout: Rivals: ESPN: (NR)					
Donald Hopkins; DT	Lago Vista, Texas	Lago Vista HS	6 ft 2 in (1.88 m)	270 lb (120 kg)	4.90	Jan 15, 2012
Donald Hopkins; DT	Recruit ratings: Scout: Rivals: ESPN: (80)					
Jarrett Irving; WR	Spring, Texas	Dekaney HS	5 ft 11 in (1.80 m)	175 lb (79 kg)	4.45	Jul 8, 2011
Jarrett Irving; WR	Recruit ratings: Scout: Rivals: ESPN: (70)					
Ryan Jackson; RB	Angleton, Texas	Angleton HS	5 ft 11 in (1.80 m)	180 lb (82 kg)	4.50	May 28, 2011
Ryan Jackson; RB	Recruit ratings: Scout: Rivals: ESPN: (NR)					
William Jackson; S	Houston, Texas	Wheatley HS	6 ft 2 in (1.88 m)	178 lb (81 kg)	4.50	Jan 27, 2012
William Jackson; S	Recruit ratings: Scout: Rivals: ESPN: (NR)					
Thaddeus LaGrone; OLB	Allen, Texas	Allen HS	6 ft 2 in (1.88 m)	204 lb (93 kg)	4.53	Jan 25, 2012
Thaddeus LaGrone; OLB	Recruit ratings: Scout: Rivals: ESPN: (74)					
Mac Long; OT	Edna, Texas	Edna HS	6 ft 4 in (1.93 m)	276 lb (125 kg)	N/A	Apr 21, 2011
Mac Long; OT	Recruit ratings: Scout: Rivals: ESPN: (79)					
Cameron Malveaux; DE	Hamshire, Texas	Hamshire-Fannett HS	6 ft 6 in (1.98 m)	215 lb (98 kg)	4.80	Aug 16, 2011
Cameron Malveaux; DE	Recruit ratings: Scout: Rivals: ESPN: (NR)					
Tomme Mark; DT	Lufkin, Texas	Lufkin HS	6 ft 2 in (1.88 m)	258 lb (117 kg)	4.85	Nov 22, 2011
Tomme Mark; DT	Recruit ratings: Scout: Rivals: ESPN: (76)					
Xavier Maxwell; WR	Humble, Texas	Blinn (JC)	6 ft 0 in (1.83 m)	177 lb (80 kg)	4.50	Jan 30, 2012
Xavier Maxwell; WR	Recruit ratings: Scout: Rivals: ESPN: (NR)					
Adrian McDonald; CB	Lawton, Oklahoma	Eisenhower HS	5 ft 11 in (1.80 m)	165 lb (75 kg)	4.50	Jan 31, 2012
Adrian McDonald; CB	Recruit ratings: Scout: Rivals: ESPN: (67)					
Larry McDuffey; WR	Galena Park, Texas	North Shore Senior HS	5 ft 11 in (1.80 m)	165 lb (75 kg)	4.45	Sep 15, 2011
Larry McDuffey; WR	Recruit ratings: Scout: Rivals: ESPN: (75)					
Devin Parks; RB	Edna, Texas	Edna HS	5 ft 10 in (1.78 m)	166 lb (75 kg)	4.40	Nov 9, 2011
Devin Parks; RB	Recruit ratings: Scout: Rivals: ESPN: (NR)					
Andrew Rodriguez; WR	Allen, Texas	Allen HS	5 ft 10 in (1.78 m)	170 lb (77 kg)	4.50	Jan 28, 2012
Andrew Rodriguez; WR	Recruit ratings: Scout: Rivals: ESPN: (NR)					
Bryan Singleton; DE	Destrehan, Louisiana	Destrehan HS	6 ft 4 in (1.93 m)	248 lb (112 kg)	4.80	Dec 1, 2011
Bryan Singleton; DE	Recruit ratings: Scout: Rivals: ESPN: (78)					
Trevon Stewart; CB	Patterson, Louisiana	Patterson HS	5 ft 10 in (1.78 m)	190 lb (86 kg)	4.50	Jul 30, 2011
Trevon Stewart; CB	Recruit ratings: Scout: Rivals: ESPN: (75)					
Steven Taylor; MLB	Cedar Hill, Texas	Cedar Hill HS	6 ft 1 in (1.85 m)	205 lb (93 kg)	4.70	Jan 21, 2012
Steven Taylor; MLB	Recruit ratings: Scout: Rivals: ESPN: (NR)					
Terrence Taylor; RB	Diboll, Texas	Diboll HS	5 ft 11 in (1.80 m)	205 lb (93 kg)	4.50	Mar 10, 2011
Terrence Taylor; RB	Recruit ratings: Scout: Rivals: ESPN: (74)					
Davonte Thomas; S	Houston, Texas	Eisenhower HS	6 ft 2 in (1.88 m)	181 lb (82 kg)	4.50	Mar 24, 2011
Davonte Thomas; S	Recruit ratings: Scout: Rivals: ESPN: (NR)					
Jontrey Tillman; WR	Baldwin, Louisiana	West Saint Mary HS	5 ft 9 in (1.75 m)	173 lb (78 kg)	4.40	Jan 29, 2012
Jontrey Tillman; WR	Recruit ratings: Scout: Rivals: ESPN: (74)					
Overall recruit ranking:
‡ Refers to 40-yard dash; Note: In many cases, Scout, Rivals, 247Sports, On3, and ESPN may conflict in their listings of height, weight and 40 time.; In these cases, the average was taken. ESPN grades are on a 100-point scale.; Sources: "2012 Houston Commits". Scout.; "Scout.com Team Recruiting Rankings". Scout.; "2012 Team Ranking". Rivals.com.

=== Awards & award watch lists ===
Jacolby Ashworth

- Lombardi Award watch list

D. J. Hayden

- Jim Thorpe Award watch list

Richie Leone

- Ray Guy Award watch list

Charles Sims

- Maxwell Award watch list

== Schedule ==
Date	Time	Opponent	Site	TV	Result	Attendance
September 1	7:00 pm	Texas State*	Robertson Stadium; Houston, TX	CSS	L 13–30	32,207
September 8	7:00 pm	Louisiana Tech*	Robertson Stadium; Houston, TX	CBSSN	L 49–56	29,142
September 15	9:30 pm	at No. 22 UCLA*	Rose Bowl; Pasadena, CA	Pac-12 Network	L 6–37	53,723
September 29	2:30 pm	vs. Rice	Reliant Stadium; Houston, TX (rivalry)	FSN	W 35–14	32,718
October 6	6:00 pm	North Texas*	Robertson Stadium; Houston, TX	CSS/CSNH	W 44–21	25,476
October 13	11:00 am	UAB	Robertson Stadium; Houston, TX	FSN	W 39–17	25,242
October 18	7:00 pm	at SMU	Gerald J. Ford Stadium; University Park, TX (rivalry)	FSN	L 42–72	16,459
October 27	3:30 pm	UTEP	Robertson Stadium; Houston, TX	CSS/CSNH	W 45–35	27,433
November 3	11:00 am	at East Carolina	Dowdy–Ficklen Stadium; Greenville, NC	FSN	L 28–48	45,455
November 10	4:00 pm	Tulsa^{†}	Robertson Stadium; Houston, TX	CBSSN	L 7–41	25,827
November 17	11:00 am	at Marshall	Joan C. Edwards Stadium; Huntington, WV	CSS/CSNH	L 41–44	18,831
November 24	2:30 pm	Tulane	Robertson Stadium; Houston, TX	FSN	W 40–17	25,402
*Non-conference game; ^{†}Homecoming; Rankings from Coaches' Poll released prior to the game

== Coaching staff ==
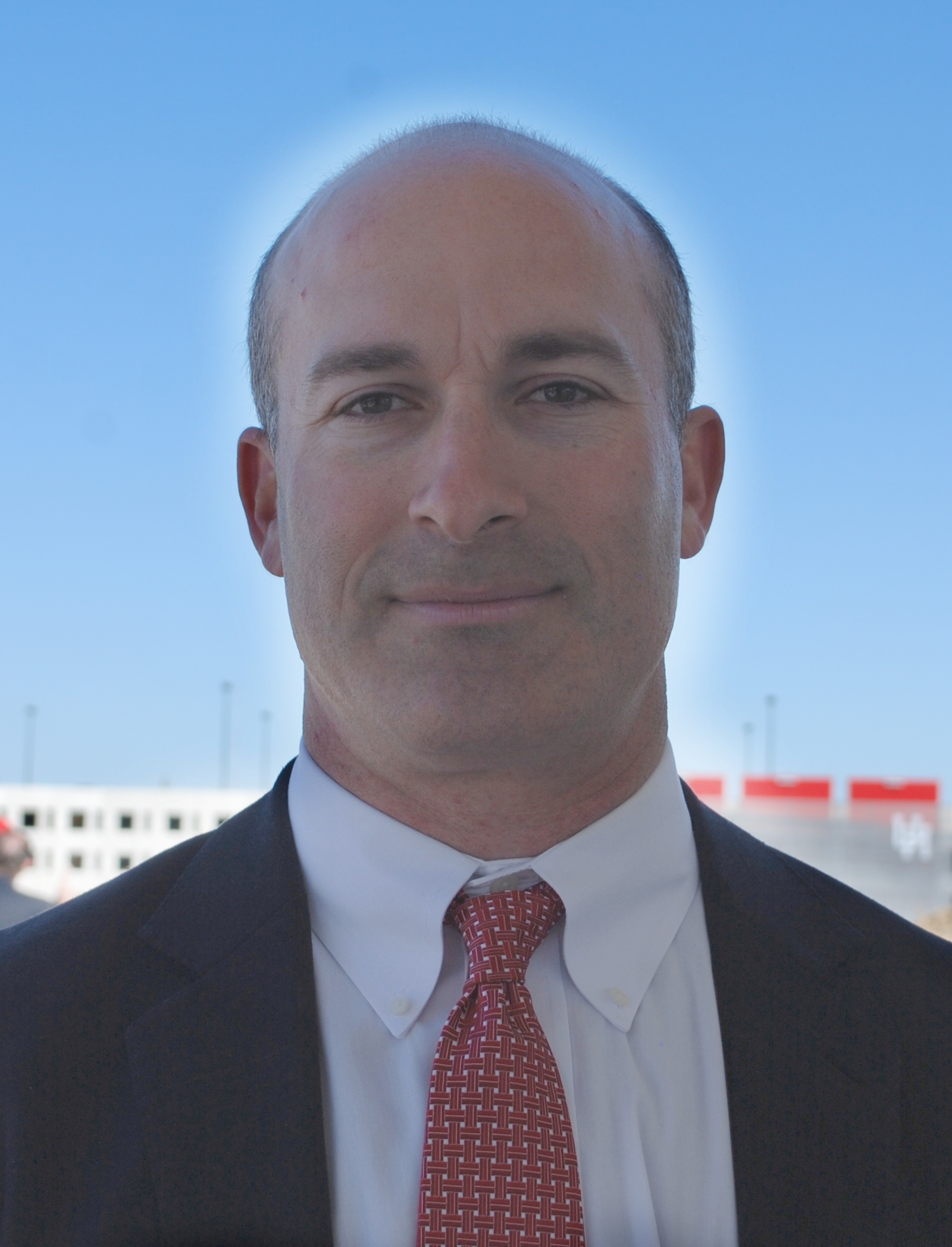
Head coach Tony Levine began his first full season in that position for 2012

Name	Position	Alma mater (Year)
Tony Levine	Head coach	Minnesota (1995)
Travis Bush	Offensive coordinator/quarterbacks	Texas State (2000)
Jamie Bryant	Defensive coordinator	Ohio Wesleyan (1993)
Jamie Christian	Special teams coordinator/Inside receivers	Central Washington (1999)
Lee Hays	Offensive line	Texas A&M–Kingsville (1996)
Ricky Logo	Defensive line	North Carolina State (1992)
Carlton Hall	Defensive line	Vanderbilt (1998)
Ken McClintock	Running backs	Minnesota (1993)
Brandon Middleton	Outside receivers	Houston (2004)
Zac Spavital	Cornerbacks	Murray State (2004)
Brian Odom	Co-director of sports performance	Southeastern Oklahoma State (2004)

== Game summaries ==
=== Texas State ===
	1	2	3	4	Total
Bobcats	14	13	0	3	30
Cougars	10	0	3	0	13

Statistics	TXST	HOU
First downs	23	15
Total yards	444	326
Rushing yards	248	115
Passing yards	196	211
Turnovers	1	2
Time of possession	43:09	16:51

Team	Category	Player	Statistics
Texas State	Passing	Shaun Rutherford	19/25, 196 yards, TD
Texas State	Rushing	Marcus Curry	14 rushes, 131 yards, 2 TD
Texas State	Receiving	Isaiah Battle	5 receptions, 75 yards
Houston	Passing	David Piland	17/44, 211 yards, TD, INT
Houston	Rushing	Charles Sims	13 rushes, 77 yards
Houston	Receiving	Larry McDuffey	2 receptions, 73 yards, TD

=== Louisiana Tech ===
	1	2	3	4	Total
Bulldogs	14	7	21	14	56
Cougars	6	14	7	22	49

Statistics	LT	HOU
First downs	38	40
Total yards	598	693
Rushing yards	245	113
Passing yards	353	580
Turnovers	0	2
Time of possession	28:07	31:53

Team	Category	Player	Statistics
Louisiana Tech	Passing	Colby Cameron	34/52, 353 yards, 2 TD
Louisiana Tech	Rushing	Tevin King	13 rushes, 112 yards, 3 TD
Louisiana Tech	Receiving	Myles White	5 receptions, 74 yards
Houston	Passing	David Piland	53/77, 580 yards, 4 TD
Houston	Rushing	Charles Sims	21 rushes, 65 yards, 2 TD
Houston	Receiving	Daniel Spencer	7 receptions, 157 yards, TD

=== At No. 22 UCLA ===
	1	2	3	4	Total
Cougars	0	0	0	6	6
No. 22 Bruins	14	3	13	7	37

Statistics	HOU	UCLA
First downs	14	29
Total yards	388	567
Rushing yards	139	247
Passing yards	249	320
Turnovers	6	5
Time of possession	18:40	41:07

Team	Category	Player	Statistics
Houston	Passing	David Piland	28/60, 249 yards, 5 INT
Houston	Rushing	Kenneth Farrow	13 rushes, 74 yards
Houston	Receiving	DeWayne Peace	10 receptions, 103 yards
UCLA	Passing	Brett Hundley	27/42, 320 yards, 2 TD, 2 INT
UCLA	Rushing	Johnathan Franklin	25 rushes, 110 yards
UCLA	Receiving	Steven Manfro	7 receptions, 78 yards

=== Vs. Rice ===
	1	2	3	4	Total
Cougars	7	7	14	7	35
Owls	0	0	7	7	14

Statistics	HOU	RICE
First downs	30	17
Total yards	608	343
Rushing yards	247	69
Passing yards	361	274
Turnovers	3	1
Time of possession	29:13	30:47

Team	Category	Player	Statistics
Houston	Passing	David Piland	26/43, 361 yards, 2 TD, INT
Houston	Rushing	Charles Sims	24 rushes, 158 yards, 3 TD
Houston	Receiving	Larry McDuffey	8 receptions, 100 yards, TD
Rice	Passing	Driphus Jackson	17/35, 272 yards, 2 TD
Rice	Rushing	Charles Ross	13 rushes, 52 yards
Rice	Receiving	Sam McGuffie	6 receptions, 119 yards, 2 TD

=== North Texas ===
	1	2	3	4	Total
Mean Green	0	14	7	0	21
Cougars	17	14	10	3	44

Statistics	UNT	HOU
First downs	25	35
Total yards	483	623
Rushing yards	231	302
Passing yards	252	321
Turnovers	2	0
Time of possession	34:28	25:32

Team	Category	Player	Statistics
North Texas	Passing	Derek Thompson	20/38, 252 yards, 2 INT
North Texas	Rushing	Brandin Byrd	19 rushes, 96 yards
North Texas	Receiving	Ivan Delgado	4 receptions, 85 yards
Houston	Passing	David Piland	31/41, 321 yards, 2 TD
Houston	Rushing	Charles Sims	21 rushes, 210 yards, TD
Houston	Receiving	Dewayne Peace	9 receptions, 83 yards, TD

=== UAB ===
	1	2	3	4	Total
Blazers	7	3	0	7	17
Cougars	10	6	20	3	39

Statistics	UAB	HOU
First downs	21	32
Total yards	374	561
Rushing yards	35	181
Passing yards	339	380
Turnovers	2	1
Time of possession	26:22	33:38

Team	Category	Player	Statistics
UAB	Passing	Austin Brown	20/43, 302 yards, TD, INT
UAB	Rushing	Greg Franklin	5 rushes, 50 yards, TD
UAB	Receiving	J. J. Nelson	6 receptions, 106 yards
Houston	Passing	David Piland	32/44, 362 yards, TD
Houston	Rushing	Charles Sims	26 rushes, 128 yards
Houston	Receiving	Shane Ros	7 receptions, 114 yards, TD

=== At SMU ===
	1	2	3	4	Total
Cougars	7	7	14	14	42
Mustangs	14	14	31	13	72

Statistics	HOU	SMU
First downs	30	20
Total yards	560	384
Rushing yards	115	119
Passing yards	445	265
Turnovers	9	2
Time of possession	41:18	31:11

Team	Category	Player	Statistics
Houston	Passing	Crawford Jones	17/33, 252 yards, 3 TD, 2 INT
Houston	Rushing	Charles Sims	17 rushes, 54 yards, 2 TD
Houston	Receiving	Charles Sims	7 receptions, 114 yards, 2 TD
SMU	Passing	Garrett Gilbert	23/38, 265 yards, 4 TD, 2 INT
SMU	Rushing	Zach Line	22 rushes, 113 yards, 2 TD
SMU	Receiving	Darius Johnson	9 receptions, 110 yards, 2 TD

=== UTEP ===
	1	2	3	4	Total
Miners	0	7	7	21	35
Cougars	14	21	10	0	45

Statistics	UTEP	HOU
First downs		
Total yards		
Rushing yards		
Passing yards		
Turnovers		
Time of possession		

Team	Category	Player	Statistics
UTEP	Passing		
UTEP	Rushing		
UTEP	Receiving		
Houston	Passing		
Houston	Rushing		
Houston	Receiving		

=== At East Carolina ===
	1	2	3	4	Total
Cougars	0	7	7	14	28
Pirates	14	14	3	17	48

Statistics	HOU	ECU
First downs		
Total yards		
Rushing yards		
Passing yards		
Turnovers		
Time of possession		

Team	Category	Player	Statistics
Houston	Passing		
Houston	Rushing		
Houston	Receiving		
East Carolina	Passing		
East Carolina	Rushing		
East Carolina	Receiving		

=== Tulsa ===
	1	2	3	4	Total
Golden Hurricane	3	14	7	17	41
Cougars	0	0	0	7	7

Statistics	TLSA	HOU
First downs		
Total yards		
Rushing yards		
Passing yards		
Turnovers		
Time of possession		

Team	Category	Player	Statistics
Tulsa	Passing		
Tulsa	Rushing		
Tulsa	Receiving		
Houston	Passing		
Houston	Rushing		
Houston	Receiving		

=== At Marshall ===
	1	2	3	4	Total
Cougars	0	10	14	17	41
Thundering Herd	10	21	7	6	44

Statistics	HOU	MRSH
First downs		
Total yards		
Rushing yards		
Passing yards		
Turnovers		
Time of possession		

Team	Category	Player	Statistics
Houston	Passing		
Houston	Rushing		
Houston	Receiving		
Marshall	Passing		
Marshall	Rushing		
Marshall	Receiving		

=== Tulane ===
	1	2	3	4	Total
Green Wave	0	7	10	0	17
Cougars	17	3	7	13	40

Statistics	TULN	HOU
First downs		
Total yards		
Rushing yards		
Passing yards		
Turnovers		
Time of possession		

Team	Category	Player	Statistics
Tulane	Passing		
Tulane	Rushing		
Tulane	Receiving		
Houston	Passing		
Houston	Rushing		
Houston	Receiving		
