= Paul Gipson =

American football player (1946–1985)

No. 40, 23, 46
- Position: Running back

Personal information
- Born: March 21, 1946; Jacksonville, Texas, U.S.
- Died: January 16, 1985 (aged 38); Houston, Texas, U.S.
- Listed height: 6 ft 0 in (1.83 m)
- Listed weight: 210 lb (95 kg)

Career information
- High school: Booker T. Washington (Houston, Texas)
- College: Houston
- NFL draft: 1969: 2nd round, 29th overall pick

Career history
- Atlanta Falcons (1969–1970); Detroit Lions (1971); New England Patriots (1973)

Awards and highlights
- First-team All-American (1968)

Career NFL statistics
- Rushing yards: 491
- Rushing average: 4
- Receptions: 21
- Receiving yards: 240
- Total touchdowns: 4
- Stats at Pro Football Reference

Paul Theodis Gipson (March 21, 1946 – January 16, 1985) was an American professional football player who was a running back for four seasons with the Atlanta Falcons, Detroit Lions, and New England Patriots of the National Football League (NFL). He played college football for the Houston Cougars.

== Biography ==
Gipson played high school football at Conroe Washington, which at the time was an all-black school. He played running back and fullback while at the University of Houston. He was one of the first black athletes recruited by "UH". In his senior season he was a first team American Football Coaches Association and second team Associated Press All-American. Gipson set several school rushing records (for a complete listing, see below). In his University of Houston career he rushed for 2,769 yards on 447 carries (6.2 yard average). He is considered one of the greatest athletes in UH history.

Gipson was a second round draft pick (29th overall) by the Atlanta Falcons in the 1969 NFL/AFL draft. He was traded to the Detroit Lions in 1971 and went from Detroit to the New England Patriots in 1973.

In 1974 Gipson also played in the World Football League with the Shreveport Steamer. He wore jersey number 0 because he maintained he was "starting all over again" after a bout with alcoholism.

Gipson often returned to the Houston Cougars football team to watch practice sessions and visit with coaching staff.

In 1984 Gipson was sentenced to three years prison time for a Harris County conviction of delivery of a controlled substance. He served time in the Texas Department of Corrections from August 15 to December 6, 1984, when he was released on early parole.

According to medical records, Gipson was treated for shotgun wounds on December 27, 1984 at Ben Taub Hospital. Police had no records of the shooting.

On the morning of Wednesday, January 16, 1985, Gipson was found unconscious by his uncle, Elmer Gipson, in the 2000 block of Milby in Houston. He had died of a heart attack at 38 years old. Funeral services were held at 3 p.m. on Saturday, January 19 at Pilgrim Rest Baptist Church in Conroe, Texas and burial at Golden Gate Cemetery.

== University of Houston Cougars records set ==
- Rushing yards gained, career: 2,769 yards on 447 carries
  - Broken by Robert Newhouse
- Rushing yards gained, season: 1,550 yards on 242 carries, 1968
  - Broken by Robert Newhouse (1,757 yards on 277 carries, 1971)
- Rushing yards gained, game: 282 yards on 29 carries, vs. Tulsa, November 23, 1968
  - Broken by Joffrey Reynolds (300 yards on 41 carries, vs. East Carolina, November 9, 2002)
- Most games with 200 or more rushing yards gained, career: 4 games
  - Tied by Robert Newhouse and Anthony Alridge
- Most games with 200 or more rushing yards gained, season: 3 games, 1968
  - Tied by Robert Newhouse, 1971 and Anthony Alridge, 2007
- Most consecutive games, 200 or more rushing yards gained, career: 2 (October 26 – November 2, 1968)
- Most consecutive games, 200 or more rushing yards gained, season: 2 (October 26 – November 2, 1968)
- Most carries, season: 242 carries, 1968
  - Broken by Robert Newhouse (277 carries, 1971)
- Most carries, game: 37 carries, twice, vs. Georgia, and vs. Memphis State, both in 1968
  - Broken by Joffrey Reynolds (41 carries, vs. East Carolina, November 9, 2002)
- Most rushing touchdowns, season: 13 TD in 1968
  - Broken by Antowain Smith (14 TD, 1996)
- Most rushing touchdowns, career: 25 TD, 1966–1968
  - Broken by Chuck Weatherspoon (27 TD, 1987–1990)
