= 2010 Houston Cougars football team =

American college football season

2010 Houston Cougars football
- Conference: Conference USA
- West
- Record: 5–7 (4–4 C-USA)
- Head coach: Kevin Sumlin (3rd season)
- Co-offensive coordinators: Jason Phillips (1st season); Kliff Kingsbury (1st season)
- Offensive scheme: Air raid
- Defensive coordinator: Brian Stewart (1st season)
- Base defense: 3–4
- Home stadium: Robertson Stadium

2010 Conference USA football standings
	Conf.			Overall
Team	W		L	W		L
East Division
No. 21 UCF x$	7	–	1	11	–	3
East Carolina	5	–	3	6	–	7
Southern Miss	5	–	3	8	–	5
Marshall	4	–	4	5	–	7
UAB	3	–	5	4	–	8
Memphis	0	–	8	1	–	11
West Division
SMU xy	6	–	2	7	–	7
No. 24 Tulsa x	6	–	2	10	–	3
Houston	4	–	4	5	–	7
UTEP	3	–	5	6	–	7
Rice	3	–	5	4	–	8
Tulane	2	–	6	4	–	8
Championship: UCF 17, SMU 7
$ – Conference champion; x – Division champion/co-champions; y – Championship game participant; As of January 11, 2011; Rankings from AP Poll

The 2010 Houston Cougars football team (also known as the Houston Cougars, Houston, or UH) represented the University of Houston in the 2010 NCAA Division I FBS football season. It was the 65th year of season play for Houston. The team was coached by third-year head football coach Kevin Sumlin, and played its home games at Robertson Stadium—a 32,000-seat stadium on campus in Houston. The program is a member of Conference USA in its West Division. Although ranked favorably early in the season, the team finished with a 5–7 record, (4–4 in C-USA play) after season-ending injuries to starting quarterback Case Keenum and other key players.

== Preseason ==
=== Recruits ===
Houston's 2010 recruiting class was highly rated relative to its previous seasons. Rated as the No. 45 best recruiting class in the nation ahead of TCU and behind Oregon State by Rivals.com, the 2010 class was Houston's highest-ever ranking by the site. Scout.com ranked Houston as #54, which was the highest Houston had been ranked since 2003, and the 3rd-highest-ever ranking by the site.

This was also the highest-rated recruiting class in Conference USA by both sites for the season. In terms of position, Houston ranked No. 13 in the nation by Scout.com for best average ratings of quarterbacks recruited. This reinforced the team's depth in the position, as senior Case Keenum was scheduled to compete in his last season in 2010.

College recruiting information (2010)
Name	Hometown	School	Height	Weight	40^{‡}	Commit date
Kenneth Bibbins; TE	Sugar Land, Texas	Kempner	6 ft 4 in (1.93 m)	208 lb (94 kg)	4.72	Jul 14, 2009
Kenneth Bibbins; TE	Recruit ratings: Scout: Rivals: (75)					
Eric Braswell; DE	Killeen, Texas	Shoemaker	6 ft 4 in (1.93 m)	233 lb (106 kg)	4.80	Jul 24, 2009
Eric Braswell; DE	Recruit ratings: Scout: Rivals: (40)					
Terrance Broadway; QB	Baton Rouge, Louisiana	Capitol	6 ft 1 in (1.85 m)	197 lb (89 kg)	4.65	Jul 24, 2009
Terrance Broadway; QB	Recruit ratings: Scout: Rivals: (78)					
Kent Brooks; DB	Humble, Texas	Atascocita	5 ft 11 in (1.80 m)	200 lb (91 kg)	4.50	Mar 8, 2009
Kent Brooks; DB	Recruit ratings: Scout: Rivals: (77)					
Sammy Brown; LB	Perkinston, Mississippi	Mississippi Gulf Coast C.C.	6 ft 3 in (1.91 m)	236 lb (107 kg)	4.60	Dec 7, 2009
Sammy Brown; LB	Recruit ratings: Scout: Rivals: (N/A)					
Xavier Brown; RB	Pearland, Texas	Dawson	6 ft 0 in (1.83 m)	194 lb (88 kg)	4.50	Dec 19, 2008
Xavier Brown; RB	Recruit ratings: Scout: Rivals: (74)					
Alton Demby; DB	Galena Park, Texas	North Shore	5 ft 10 in (1.78 m)	178 lb (81 kg)	4.50	Mar 18, 2009
Alton Demby; DB	Recruit ratings: Scout: Rivals: (76)					
Jeremiah Farley; DE	Longview, Texas	Longview	6 ft 1 in (1.85 m)	233 lb (106 kg)	4.70	Apr 29, 2009
Jeremiah Farley; DE	Recruit ratings: Scout: Rivals: (40)					
Rowdy Harper; OL	Broken Arrow, Oklahoma	Broken Arrow	6 ft 6 in (1.98 m)	268 lb (122 kg)	5.20	Sep 13, 2009
Rowdy Harper; OL	Recruit ratings: Scout: Rivals: (77)					
Chris Hill; OL	Houston, Texas	Yates	6 ft 5 in (1.96 m)	288 lb (131 kg)	N/A	Sep 13, 2009
Chris Hill; OL	Recruit ratings: Scout: Rivals: (71)					
Aaron Johnson; QB	Longview, Texas	Longview	6 ft 1 in (1.85 m)	178 lb (81 kg)	4.60	Aug 7, 2009
Aaron Johnson; QB	Recruit ratings: Scout: Rivals: (73)					
Jordan Jolly; WR	Missouri City, Texas	Elkins	6 ft 1 in (1.85 m)	169 lb (77 kg)	4.55	Jul 13, 2009
Jordan Jolly; WR	Recruit ratings: Scout: Rivals: (77)					
D.J. Jones; DB	Cibolo, Texas	Steele	6 ft 1 in (1.85 m)	183 lb (83 kg)	4.50	Jul 24, 2009
D.J. Jones; DB	Recruit ratings: Scout: Rivals: (40)					
Darian Lazard; QB	Pearland, Texas	Dawson	6 ft 1 in (1.85 m)	173 lb (78 kg)	4.58	Dec 18, 2009
Darian Lazard; QB	Recruit ratings: Scout: Rivals: (76)					
Richie Leone; K	Roswell, Georgia	Roswell	6 ft 3 in (1.91 m)	188 lb (85 kg)	4.70	Jul 28, 2009
Richie Leone; K	Recruit ratings: Scout: Rivals: (73)					
Austin Lunsford; OL	Garrison, Texas	Garrison	6 ft 4 in (1.93 m)	293 lb (133 kg)	5.00	Jun 8, 2009
Austin Lunsford; OL	Recruit ratings: Scout: Rivals: (77)					
Zach McMillian; DB	Sugar Land, Texas	Dulles	5 ft 10 in (1.78 m)	155 lb (70 kg)	4.49	Jun 9, 2009
Zach McMillian; DB	Recruit ratings: Scout: Rivals: (75)					
Efrem Oliphant; LB	Houston, Texas	Langham	6 ft 1 in (1.85 m)	205 lb (93 kg)	4.60	Apr 16, 2009
Efrem Oliphant; LB	Recruit ratings: Scout: Rivals: (74)					
DeAndre Perry; WR	Austin, Texas	Bowie	6 ft 3 in (1.91 m)	210 lb (95 kg)	4.60	May 1, 2009
DeAndre Perry; WR	Recruit ratings: Scout: Rivals: (78)					
David Piland; QB	Southlake, Texas	Carroll	6 ft 2 in (1.88 m)	178 lb (81 kg)	4.70	Aug 8, 2009
David Piland; QB	Recruit ratings: Scout: Rivals: (71)					
Bryce Redman; OL	Longview, Texas	Longview	6 ft 2 in (1.88 m)	265 lb (120 kg)	4.90	Jun 6, 2009
Bryce Redman; OL	Recruit ratings: Scout: Rivals: (74)					
Dominique Sanders; ATH	Fort Worth, Texas	Dunbar	6 ft 1 in (1.85 m)	193 lb (88 kg)	4.45	Jan 23, 2010
Dominique Sanders; ATH	Recruit ratings: Scout: Rivals: (N/A)					
Matangi Tonga; DT	San Mateo, California	C. of San Mateo	6 ft 3 in (1.91 m)	283 lb (128 kg)	4.67	Jan 15, 2010
Matangi Tonga; DT	Recruit ratings: Scout: Rivals: (N/A)					
Langston Williams; WR	Arlington, Texas	Bowie	5 ft 8 in (1.73 m)	160 lb (73 kg)	4.40	Jul 28, 2009
Langston Williams; WR	Recruit ratings: Scout: Rivals: (40)					
Rodney Williams; DT	Dallas, Texas	Skyline	6 ft 1 in (1.85 m)	260 lb (120 kg)	N/A	May 28, 2009
Rodney Williams; DT	Recruit ratings: Scout: Rivals: (75)					
Austin Wilson; LB	Tyler, Texas	Lee	6 ft 0 in (1.83 m)	200 lb (91 kg)	4.60	Sep 26, 2009
Austin Wilson; LB	Recruit ratings: Scout: Rivals: (40)					
Jon Witten; LB	Houston, Texas	Clear Lake	6 ft 2 in (1.88 m)	209 lb (95 kg)	4.64	Mar 12, 2009
Jon Witten; LB	Recruit ratings: Scout: Rivals: (73)					
Overall recruit ranking: Scout: 54 Rivals: 45
‡ Refers to 40-yard dash; Note: In many cases, Scout, Rivals, 247Sports, On3, and ESPN may conflict in their listings of height, weight and 40 time.; In these cases, the average was taken. ESPN grades are on a 100-point scale.; Sources: "Houston Commit List for 2010". Rivals.; "Houston: Commits". Scout.; "Houston Football Recruiting 2010". ESPN.; "Scout.com Team Recruiting Rankings". Scout.; "2010 Team Ranking". Rivals.com.

== Coaching staff ==
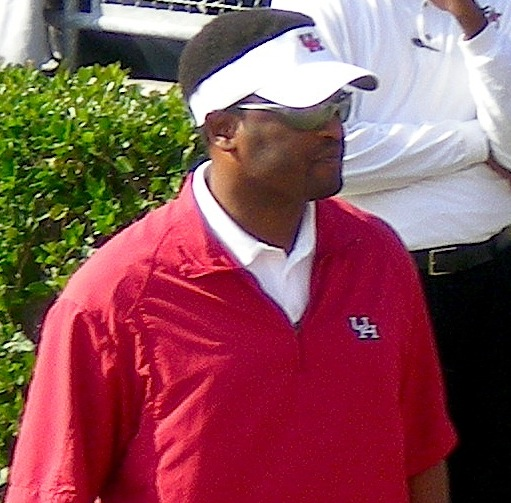
Houston head coach Kevin Sumlin

Name	Position	Alma mater (Year)
Kevin Sumlin	Head coach	Purdue (1986)
Jason Phillips	Offensive coordinator	Houston (1988)
Brian Stewart	Defensive coordinator	Northern Arizona (1992)
Tony Levine	Special teams	Minnesota (1996)
Kliff Kingsbury	Co-offensive coordinator	Texas Tech (2002)
Leon Burtnett	Linebackers	Southwestern College (1965)
Jim Jeffcoat	Defensive line	Arizona State (1982)
Lee Hays	Offensive line	Texas A&M–Kingsville (1997)
Clarence McKinney	Running backs	Mary (1994)
Charles McMillian	Defensive backs	Utah State (1995)
Zac Spavital	Cornerbacks	Murray State (2004)

=== Top 25 rankings ===
During the pre-season, Houston was ranked in several notable top 25 polls. Sports Illustrated placed Houston at No. 21 in its power rankings list. Lindy's Sports ranked Houston as #23, and Phil Steele ranked the team as #24. Just outside the top 25, Sporting News ranked Houston as #26, and in the Coaches' Poll as #27.

=== Awards & award watch lists ===
Case Keenum

- Davey O'Brien Award watch list
- Johnny Unitas Golden Arm Award watch list
- Manning Award watch list
- Maxwell Award
- Walter Camp Award watch list
- Conference USA Preseason Offensive Player of the Year
- Conference USA Preseason offensive first team selection

Jamal Robinson

- Conference USA Preseason defensive first team selection

James Cleveland

- Fred Biletnikoff Award watch list
- Conference USA Preseason offensive first team selection

Marcus McGraw

- Bronko Nagurski Trophy watch list
- Lombardi Award watch list
- Conference USA Preseason defensive first team selection

Patrick Edwards

- Fred Biletnikoff Award watch list

Tyron Carrier

- Fred Biletnikoff Award watch list
- Paul Hornung Award watch list
- Conference USA Preseason Special Teams Player of the Year
- Conference USA Preseason special teams first team selection

== Roster ==
2010 Houston Cougars football team roster
Players			Coaches
Offense: Pos. / # / Name / Class; QB / 7 / Case Keenum / Sr	Defense: Pos. / # / Name / Class	Special teams: Pos. / # / Name / Class	Head coach: Kevin Sumlin; Coordinators/assistant coaches Legend: (C) Team captain; (S) Suspended; (I) Ineligible; Injured; Redshirt; Roster

== Schedule ==
Date	Time	Opponent	Rank	Site	TV	Result	Attendance
September 4	7:00 p.m.	Texas State*		Robertson Stadium; Houston, TX		W 68–28	32,119^{A}
September 10	9:15 p.m.	UTEP		Robertson Stadium; Houston, TX	ESPN	W 54–24	32,119^{B}
September 18	9:30 p.m.	at UCLA*	No. 23	Rose Bowl; Pasadena, CA	FSN	L 13–31	54,407
September 25	2:30 p.m.	Tulane		Robertson Stadium; Houston, TX	CBSCS	W 42–23	32,007
October 9	7:00 p.m.	Mississippi State*		Robertson Stadium; Houston, TX	CBSCS	L 24–47	32,067
October 16	2:30 p.m.	at Rice		Rice Stadium; Houston, TX (rivalry)	CSS	L 31–34	26,342
October 23	2:30 p.m.	at SMU		Gerald J. Ford Stadium; Dallas, TX (rivalry)	CBSCS	W 45–20	20,741
October 30	6:00 p.m.	at Memphis		Liberty Bowl Memorial Stadium; Memphis, TN	CSS	W 56–17	19,731
November 5	7:00 p.m.	UCF		Robertson Stadium; Houston, TX	ESPN2	L 33–40	32,008
November 13	7:00 p.m.	Tulsa^{†}		Robertson Stadium; Houston, TX	CBSCS	L 25–28	30,046
November 20	6:00 p.m.	at Southern Miss		M. M. Roberts Stadium; Hattiesburg, MS		L 41–59	32,606
November 27	7:00 p.m.	at Texas Tech*		Jones AT&T Stadium; Lubbock, TX (rivalry)	FSN	L 20–35	53,461
*Non-conference game; ^{†}Homecoming; Rankings from AP Poll released prior to the game; All times are in Central time

- ^ADenotes the largest crowd to have watched a football game at Robertson Stadium in its current capacity, and the largest Houston had ever hosted on-campus. This broke the record set during last season versus Texas Tech.
- ^BDenotes a tie for largest crowd to have watched a football game at Robertson Stadium in its current capacity, and a tie for the largest Houston had ever hosted on-campus. This matched the attendance of the previous week.

== Game summaries ==
=== Texas State ===
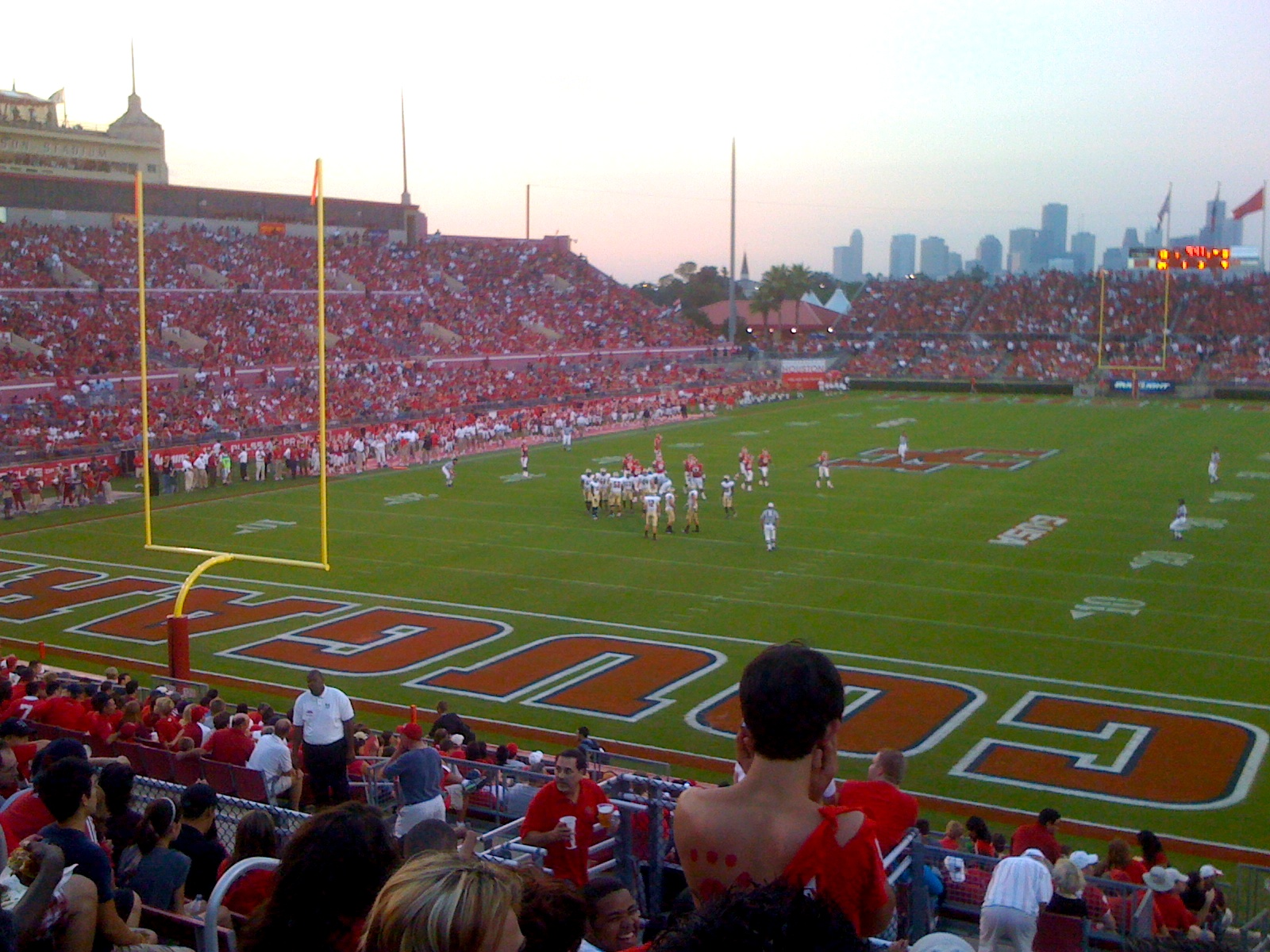
Houston versus Texas State at a sold-out Robertson Stadium

	1	2	3	4	Total
Texas State	7	0	7	14	28
Houston	20	34	14	0	68

As a season opener, Houston met with Texas State of the Southland Conference (a Division I FCS conference) for the fourth time in history. However, the two teams had not competed against each other in over six decades, with the last game being in 1948. Texas State had been undefeated against Houston, and were led by fourth-year head coach Brad Wright.

Attendance was at an all-time high for Robertson Stadium, as 32,119 fans watched the game. The record-setting crowd at the stadium surpassed the previous season record against Texas Tech. This marked the largest home-opening crowd to watch the Cougars play since 37,652 fans watched Houston face California at the Astrodome on September 6, 1997. Quarterback Case Keenum set school records for both career passing yards and career pass attempts, surpassing then-current Philadelphia Eagles starting quarterback Kevin Kolb.

=== UTEP ===
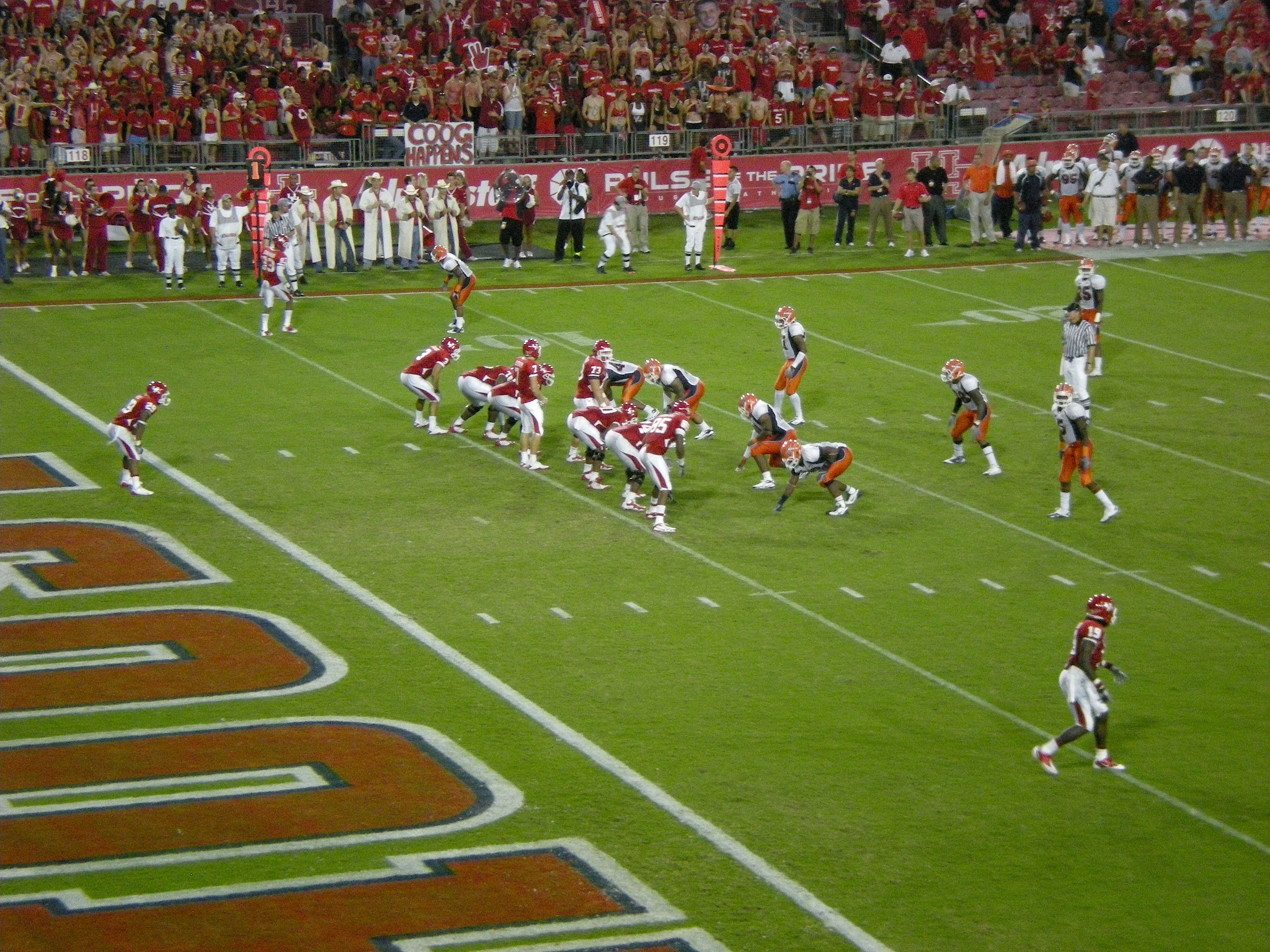
Houston's offense gets ready to start a drive from their end zone against UTEP

	1	2	3	4	Total
UTEP	7	3	7	7	24
Houston	14	17	6	17	54

Conference USA foe UTEP traveled to Robertson Stadium to face-off against Houston for the eighth time in history. Prior to UTEP's defeat, Houston's record against the team stood at 3–4. During the previous season, UTEP defeated No. 12 Houston to knock the team out of the national rankings for a period of time. The team was led by sixth-year head coach Mike Price who had previously served as head coach for Washington State with Kevin Sumlin as a graduate assistant. Attendance for the game was again at an all-time high, as the 32,119 fans in attendance tied the previous record from the game prior. The matchup was nationally televised on ESPN.

The Cougars' offensive strategy appeared to be more focused on rushing rather than the passing game Houston was known for. It was the first time the team had achieved 300 rushing yards in a game since compiling 377 yards against Texas Southern on November 24, 2007. After an interception thrown by senior Case Keenum to UTEP's Trauvan Nixon in the third quarter of the game, the quarterback attempted to tackle the opposing player. Keenum suffered a blow to the head, and was removed from the game. Back-up quarterback Cotton Turner took his place to carry on the win. It was later reported that Keenum was exhibiting symptoms of a mild concussion, but was showing dramatic improvement two days after the game. His condition was listed as being "day-to-day".

Following the game, Houston became nationally ranked for the first time since the previous season, as the Cougars entered both the AP Poll and Coaches' Poll as #23. Junior running back Bryce Beall was named the Conference USA offensive player of the week. Houston's record at 2–0, made it the only team in its conference division to remain undefeated overall, and allowed the team to take the number one spot in the standings.

=== UCLA ===
	1	2	3	4	Total
#23 Houston	3	0	0	10	13
UCLA	7	14	10	0	31

Matt Hogan kicked a 29-yard field goal to give the Cougars the first quarter lead. Johnathan Franklin answered with an 11-yard run for a Bruins 7–3 lead. The Bruins scored two touchdowns in the second quarter. Kevin Prince ran for a 2-yard touchdown and Franklin added a 1-yard run touchdown.

In the third quarter, UCLA had a 42-yard field goal by Kai Forbath, the 2009 Lou Groza Collegiate Place-Kicker Award winner, and a touchdown again by Franklin (12 yards). Houston scored twice in the fourth quarter, on James Cleveland's 10-yard pass from Terrance Broadway and on Matt Hogan's 31-yard field goal.

Two Houston quarterbacks, Case Keenum and Cotton Turner, were injured in the game and are out for the season.

UCLA's Patrick Larimore, who had a career-high and team-high 11 tackles (10 solos), including three for loss, forced a fumble and broke up a pass in the game was named Pac-10 Conference defensive player of the week. He was also named the FWAA/Bronko Nagurski National Defensive Player of the Week.

=== Tulane ===
	1	2	3	4	Total
Tulane	0	14	3	6	23
Houston	7	21	0	14	42

First quarter scoring: Houston – Bryce Beall (3-yard run).

Second quarter scoring: Tulane – Cody Sparks (13-yard pass from Kevin Moore), Devin Figaro (36-yard pass from Moore); Houston – Beall (1-yard run, 1-yard run), Michael Hayes (1-yard run).

Third quarter scoring: Tulane – Cairo Santos (29-yard field goal).

Fourth quarter scoring: Tulane – Payten Jason (9-yard run); Houston – Beall (25-yard run), Loyce Means (42-yard interception return).

== Rankings ==
Week-to-week rankings Legend: ██ Increase in ranking. ██ Decrease in ranking. ██ Not ranked the previous week. RV=receiving votes.
Poll	Pre	Wk 1	Wk 2	Wk 3	Wk 4	Wk 5	Wk 6	Wk 7	Wk 8	Wk 9	Wk 10	Wk 11	Wk 12	Wk 13	Wk 14	Final
AP	RV	RV	23	RV	RV	RV	NR	NR	NR	NR	NR	NR	NR	NR	NR	NR
Coaches	RV	RV	23	RV	RV	RV	RV	NR	NR	NR	NR	NR	NR	NR	NR	NR
Harris	Not released						NR	NR	NR	NR	NR	NR	NR	NR	NR	
BCS	Not released							NR	NR	NR	NR	NR	NR	NR	NR	
