= Robert Newhouse =

American football player (1950–2014)

No. 44
- Position: Fullback / Halfback

Personal information
- Born: January 9, 1950; Longview, Texas, U.S.
- Died: July 22, 2014 (aged 64); Rochester, Minnesota, U.S.
- Listed height: 5 ft 10 in (1.78 m)
- Listed weight: 209 lb (95 kg)

Career information
- High school: Galilee (Hallsville, Texas)
- College: Houston
- NFL draft: 1972: 2nd round, 35th overall pick

Career history
- Dallas Cowboys (1972–1983)

Awards and highlights
- Super Bowl champion (XII); Second-team All-American (1971)

Career NFL statistics
- Rushing attempts: 1,160
- Rushing yards: 4,784
- Rushing touchdowns: 31
- Receptions: 120
- Receiving yards: 956
- Receiving touchdowns: 5
- Stats at Pro Football Reference

Robert Fulton Newhouse (January 9, 1950 – July 22, 2014) was an American professional football player who was a fullback in the National Football League (NFL) for the Dallas Cowboys for twelve seasons. He played college football for the Houston Cougars.

== Early life ==
Though Newhouse had rushing performances of over 200 and 300 yards, he wasn't highly recruited coming out of Galilee High School in Hallsville, Texas, with the only Division I (NCAA) scholarship being offered by the University of Houston.

He became part of a very successful stretch for the University of Houston from 1969 to 1971. In 1969, the team finished 9–2 and ranked #12 in the AP Poll. In 1970, the team finished 8–3 and ranked 19th. In 1971, the team finished 9–3 and ranked 17th.

Before his senior season started, he suffered a cracked pelvis in a serious automobile accident; because at the time the redshirt option didn't exist, he went on to play with the injury. He was a tri-captain of the 1971 team, along with Gary Mullins and Frank Ditta. His 1,757 rushing yards were the second most yards in a season in NCAA history and the most in school history at the time. He received second-team All-American honors by the Associated Press at the end of the year.

Newhouse had a remarkable college career, finishing as the University of Houston All-time leading rusher and breaking many of the school's records, some of which still stand:

- Most rushing yards in a season (1757 in 1971)
- Most 100 yard games in a season (10 in 1971)
- Most 100 yard games in a career (16)
- Most consecutive 100 yard games in a season (7 in 1971)
- Most consecutive 100 yard games in a career (8)
- Most 200 yard games in a season (3 in 1971, tied with Anthony Alridge and Paul Gipson)
- Most 200 yard games in a career (4, tied with Anthony Alridge and Paul Gipson).

Back when the College All-Stars played the Super Bowl Champion from the year before, Newhouse scored a touchdown against the Dallas Cowboys. He also played in the Hula Bowl.

In 1977, he was inducted into the University of Houston Athletics Hall of Honor.

== Professional career ==
Newhouse was selected 35th overall in the second round of the 1972 NFL draft by the Dallas Cowboys. Steelers assistant personnel director Bill Nunn and head coach Chuck Noll both had preferred him over Franco Harris, but Pittsburgh picked the latter 13th overall in the first round. Although he had the ability to play running back, he unselfishly made the switch to fullback in order to help the team as a rookie. In 1975 he was named the regular starter at fullback, replacing the retired Walt Garrison.

Considered small for his position, he played bigger than his size. Newhouse was built very low to the ground and had enormous leg strength. He thrived on second effort, picking up the nicknames The House and The Human Bowling Ball. Newhouse was tough to bring down, "like trying to tackle a fire hydrant," at 5 ft 10 in (1.78 m) and 209 pounds (95 kg), with arguably the largest thighs in the NFL (44 inches (110 cm) in circumference together).

Newhouse was also effective as the primary running back and led the Cowboys in rushing in 1975 with 930 yards, eventually running his way through 4,784 rushing yards, 956 receiving yards and 31 touchdowns during his notable career. His longest run from scrimmage as a professional was a 54-yard gain against the Philadelphia Eagles in 1973.

While Newhouse was on the team, the Cowboys went to three Super Bowls, winning Super Bowl XII against the Denver Broncos in 1977. His most notable career highlight and Super Bowl moment was the 29-yard touchdown pass he threw (going to his left) to Golden Richards in Super Bowl XII.

Newhouse played sparingly, backing up Ron Springs during his last three seasons. He retired at the end of the 1983 season, as the fourth all-time leading rusher in team history, after playing for 12 years.

Newhouse was inducted into the Texas Black Sports Hall of Fame.

== NFL career statistics ==
Legend
	Won the Super Bowl
**Bold**	Career high

=== Regular season ===
Year	Team	Games		Rushing					Receiving				
Year	Team	GP	GS	Att	Yds	Avg	Lng	TD	Rec	Yds	Avg	Lng	TD
1972	DAL	14	0	28	116	4.1	19	1	1	8	8.0	8	0
1973	DAL	14	6	84	436	5.2	**54**	1	9	87	9.7	38	1
1974	DAL	14	2	124	501	4.0	23	3	9	67	7.4	21	0
1975	DAL	14	13	**209**	**930**	4.4	29	2	**34**	**275**	8.1	23	0
1976	DAL	14	7	116	450	3.9	24	3	15	86	5.7	16	0
1977	DAL	14	**14**	180	721	4.0	29	3	16	106	6.6	**41**	1
1978	DAL	13	12	140	584	4.2	24	**8**	20	176	8.8	24	**2**
1979	DAL	14	11	124	449	3.6	21	3	7	55	7.9	21	1
1980	DAL	**16**	10	118	451	3.8	29	6	8	75	9.4	18	0
1981	DAL	**16**	0	14	33	2.4	6	0	1	21	**21.0**	21	0
1982	DAL	9	0	14	79	**5.6**	27	1	0	0	0.0	0	0
1983	DAL	**16**	0	9	34	3.8	8	0	0	0	0.0	0	0
		168	75	1,160	4,784	4.1	54	31	120	956	8.0	41	5

=== Playoffs ===
Year	Team	Games		Rushing					Receiving				
Year	Team	GP	GS	Att	Yds	Avg	Lng	TD	Rec	Yds	Avg	Lng	TD
1972	DAL	2	0	0	0	0.0	0	0	0	0	0.0	0	0
1973	DAL	2	1	20	55	2.8	**19**	0	1	-4	-4.0	0	0
1975	DAL	**3**	**3**	44	153	3.5	16	0	4	**37**	9.3	**14**	0
1976	DAL	1	1	9	25	2.8	6	0	2	19	9.5	**14**	0
1977	DAL	**3**	**3**	**45**	**216**	4.8	**19**	**1**	**6**	17	2.8	13	0
1978	DAL	2	1	9	7	0.8	5	0	0	0	0.0	0	0
1979	DAL	1	0	7	21	3.0	6	0	0	0	0.0	0	0
1980	DAL	**3**	**3**	24	121	5.0	18	**1**	0	0	0.0	0	0
1981	DAL	2	0	4	23	**5.8**	13	0	0	0	0.0	0	0
1982	DAL	**3**	1	12	30	2.5	5	**1**	1	11	**11.0**	11	0
1983	DAL	1	0	0	0	0.0	0	0	0	0	0.0	0	0
		23	13	174	651	3.7	19	3	14	80	5.7	14	0

== Personal and later life ==
Newhouse married wife Nancy and together they had four children, including twin daughters. His youngest son Reggie Newhouse played for the Arizona Cardinals in 2004 and 2005. After his football playing career was over, he spent several years with the Dallas Cowboys working in the player-relations department. Newhouse became a U.S. bankruptcy trustee.

His health started declining after suffering a stroke in 2010, also suffering from heart disease. He died on July 22, 2014 while awaiting a heart transplant at the Mayo Clinic in Rochester, Minnesota.
