= James Cleveland (American football) =

American football player (born 1988)

No. 21
- Position: Wide receiver

Personal information
- Born: March 7, 1988 (age 38); Baytown, Texas, U.S.
- Listed height: 6 ft 1 in (1.85 m)
- Listed weight: 200 lb (91 kg)

Career information
- High school: Baytown (TX) Robert E. Lee
- College: Iowa (2007); Trinity Valley CC (2008); Houston (2009–2010)
- NFL draft: 2011: undrafted

Career history
- Dallas Cowboys (2011)*; New Mexico Stars (2014); Duke City Gladiators (2015)
- * Offseason or practice squad member only

Awards and highlights
- Freshman All-Big Ten (2007); First-team All-SWJCFC (2008); First-team All-Conference USA (2009); Conference USA Newcomer of the Year (2009)
- Stats at Pro Football Reference

James Lee Cleveland (born March 7, 1988) is an American former football wide receiver.

== College career ==
Cleveland continued his football career after high school at Iowa. After one season at Iowa, Cleveland was dismissed after he was found with drugs in his dorm room. After his dismissal, Cleveland attended Trinity Valley Community College where he played football. Upon graduation from Trinity Valley, Cleveland accepted a scholarship offer to play at Houston. Cleveland ranked second in the nation for receptions per game, and sixth in receiving yards per game for the 2009 season. He was named the 2009 Conference USA Newcomer of the Year.

== Professional career ==
=== Dallas Cowboys ===
Cleveland was not selected in the 2011 NFL draft and signed with the Dallas Cowboys as an undrafted free agent on August 1, 2011. He was cut on August 23, 2011.

=== New Mexico Stars ===
Cleveland played with the New Mexico Stars of the Lone Star Football League (LSFL) in 2014.

=== Duke City Gladiators ===
After the Stars folded just prior to the start of the 2015 season, Cleveland signed with the Duke City Gladiators of Champions Indoor Football (CIF). He re-signed with the Gladiators on October 10, 2015. He was released on March 7, 2016.

== See also ==
- 2009 Houston Cougars football team
- 2010 Houston Cougars football team
