= Manny Hazard =

American gridiron football player (born 1969)

No. 81
- Position: Wide receiver

Personal information
- Born: July 22, 1969 (age 57); Providence, Rhode Island, U.S.
- Listed height: 5 ft 8 in (1.73 m)
- Listed weight: 175 lb (79 kg)

Career information
- High school: Oceana (Pacifica, California)
- College: Houston
- NFL draft: 1991: undrafted

Career history
- Toronto Argonauts (1993); Shreveport Pirates (1994); Hamilton Tiger-Cats (1995–1996)

Awards and highlights
- First-team All-American (1989); 2x First-team All-SWC (1989, 1990)

Emmanuel J. Hazard (born July 22, 1969) is an American former professional football player who was a wide receiver in the Canadian Football League (CFL) for the Toronto Argonauts, Shreveport Pirates and Hamilton Tiger-Cats.

Hazard played college football for the Houston Cougars, earning first-team All-American honors in 1989. He played with Heisman Trophy-winning quarterback Andre Ware that season, and held the NCAA football single-season record for most receptions with 142 until December 30, 2009, when Bowling Green's Freddie Barnes broke the record in the first quarter of the 2009 Humanitarian Bowl.

Hazard went undrafted in the 1991 NFL draft.

== See also ==
- List of NCAA football records
- List of NCAA major college football yearly receiving leaders
