= Marcus McGraw =

American football player (born 1989)

No. 55
- Position: Linebacker

Personal information
- Born: October 5, 1990 (age 36); Dallas, Texas, U.S.
- Listed height: 6 ft 0 in (1.83 m)
- Listed weight: 228 lb (103 kg)

Career information
- College: Houston
- NFL draft: 2012: undrafted

Career history
- Arizona Cardinals (2012)*
- * Offseason or practice squad member only

Awards and highlights
- 3× Second-team All-C-USA (2009, 2010, 2011)

Marcus Dujuan McGraw (born October 5, 1989) is an American former football linebacker. During his college career at Houston, he was on the watch lists for the 2010 and 2011 Bronko Nagurski Trophy and Lombardi Award. He was signed by the Arizona Cardinals as an undrafted free agent in 2012.

== Early life ==
Marcus McGraw played football for Bowie High School in Arlington, Texas, where he also competed in wrestling and track & field. During his high school career, he was named to the All-District First-team and was also the District Most Valuable Player in 2007. As a senior, he helped lead his team to a 13–2 overall record. In addition to being recruited by Houston, he received scholarship offers from Buffalo, Tulsa, UNLV, Utah, and Washington State.

== Professional career ==
=== Arizona Cardinals ===
McGraw was signed by the Arizona Cardinals as an undrafted free agent following the 2012 NFL draft. He was waived on August 24, 2012.

== See also ==
- 2008 Houston Cougars football team
- 2009 Houston Cougars football team
- 2010 Houston Cougars football team
- 2011 Houston Cougars football team
