= Jamie Bryant =

American football player and coach (born 1969)

Biographical details
- Born: October 1, 1969

Playing career
- 1990–1993: Ohio Wesleyan

Coaching career (HC unless noted)
- 1992: Hayes HS (OH) (linemen)
- 1993–1995: East Clinton HS (OH)
- 1996: Anderson HS (OH) (TE)
- 1997: Clarion (OLB)
- 1998–1999: Clarion (DB)
- 2000: Saint Francis (PA) (DC/DB)
- 2001: North Carolina (GA)
- 2002–2007: Vanderbilt (Secondary)
- 2008: Vanderbilt (ST/DB)
- 2009–2010: Vanderbilt (DC/DB)
- 2011: Houston (LB)
- 2012: Houston (DC)
- 2013–2014: Youngstown State (ST/Asst. LB)
- 2015: Delaware State (DC)
- 2016–2017: Colorado State (ST)

Jamie Bryant (born October 1, 1969) is an American football coach. He was the special teams coordinator at Colorado State University. He previously served the defensive coordinator at Delaware State University and the University of Houston. After coaching a defense that ranked near the bottom in scoring and yards allowed, head coach Tony Levine decided to part ways with his assistant. As linebackers coach for the 2011 season, Bryant was promoted to defensive coordinator under head coach Levine as of 2012.
