= Mike Clendenen =

American football player (born 1963)

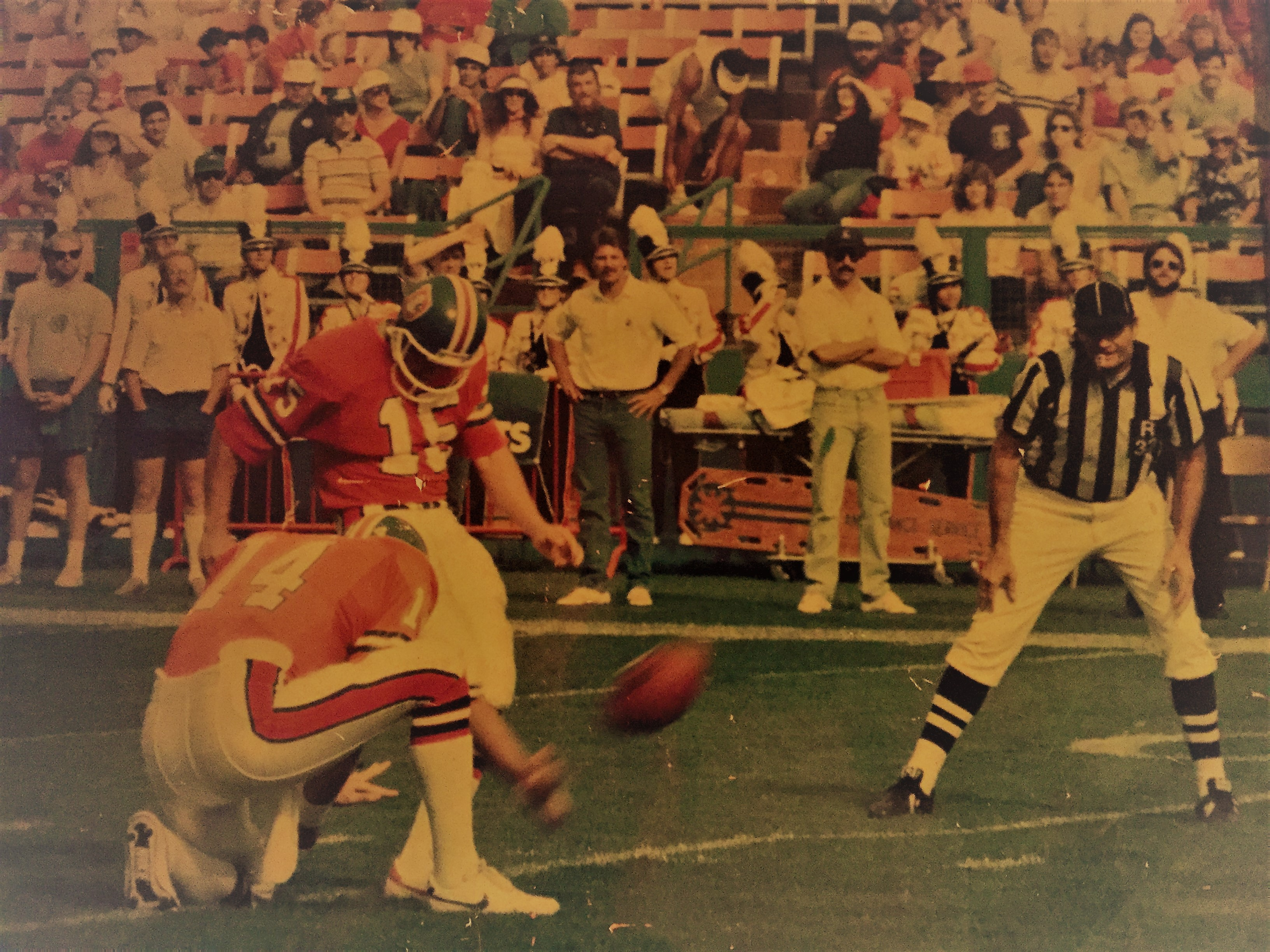
- Clendenen in 1987

No. 15
- Position: Placekicker

Personal information
- Born: June 12, 1963 (age 63); Dallas, Texas, U.S.
- Listed height: 5 ft 11 in (1.80 m)
- Listed weight: 191 lb (87 kg)

Career information
- High school: La Porte (TX)
- College: Houston (1981–1984)
- NFL draft: 1985: undrafted

Career history
- Houston Oilers (1985)*; Denver Broncos (1987)
- * Offseason or practice squad member only

Career NFL statistics
- Field goals made: 3
- Field goal attempts: 4
- Field goal %: 75
- Longest field goal: 35
- Stats at Pro Football Reference

Michael Dean Clendenen (born June 12, 1963) is an American former gridiron football player. He was a placekicker for the Houston Cougars from 1981 to 1984. Clendenen, who kicked barefoot, was the first placekicking specialist to receive an athletic scholarship from the UH football program.

Clendenen auditioned for the kicking job at La Porte High School. Just as the head coach walked onto the field for the tryout, Clendenen knocked through a 55-yarder. "I'll see you out here Monday," the coach said.
