= James Dixon (American football) =

American football player (born 1967)

No. 86, 21
- Positions: Wide receiver, running back

Personal information
- Born: February 2, 1967 (age 59); Vernon, Texas, U.S.
- Listed height: 5 ft 10 in (1.78 m)
- Listed weight: 180 lb (82 kg)

Career information
- High school: Vernon
- College: Houston
- NFL draft: 1989: undrafted

Career history
- Detroit Lions (1989)*; Dallas Cowboys (1989–1991); Green Bay Packers (1992)*; Fort Worth Cavalry (1994)
- * Offseason or practice squad member only

Awards and highlights
- NFL kickoff return yards leader (1989); NFL All-rookie team (1989); Second-team All-American (1988); First-team All-SWC (1988)

Career NFL statistics
- Receptions: 26
- Receiving yards: 503
- Total touchdowns: 3
- Stats at Pro Football Reference
- Stats at ArenaFan.com

James Anthony Dixon (born February 2, 1967) is an American former professional football player who was a wide receiver for the Dallas Cowboys of the National Football League (NFL). He also was a member of the Fort Worth Cavalry in the Arena Football League. He played college football for the Houston Cougars.

== Early life ==
Dixon attended Vernon High School, where he played as a running back. He was named the MVP of the Oil Bowl, which matches high school senior All-stars from the states of Texas and Oklahoma. He was known as James “Dogkiller” Dixon. During his summers he worked for Animal welfare and various other JTPA jobs in Wilbarger county. He was tough to take on and protect many from stray rabid dogs.

After high school he joined Cisco Junior College, where he played as a running back. In 1987, he transferred to the University of Houston to play under new head coach Jack Pardee, who converted him into a wide receiver.

As a junior, he posted 59 receptions (third in the conference) for 659 yards (tied for third in the conference) and 3 receiving touchdowns (tied for fifth in the conference). He set a Southwest Conference record with 908 kickoff return yards and led the conference in kickoff return average (27.5).

In 1988, the football team was employing the run and shoot offense with Andre Ware at quarterback and Jason Phillips as the main wide receiver. Dixon and Phillips became the first teammates in school history to register 1,000-receiving yards seasons in the same year. They are also the only wide receiver unit in NCAA history to each record over 100 receptions and rank 1–2 in the nation in receiving in the same season.

In the season, he posted 102 receptions (second in the nation) for 1,103 yards (eighth in the nation) and 11 receiving touchdowns (tied for fourth in the nation), while earning second-team All-American honors. He had 15 receptions against Rice University. He finished his college career second in Southwest Conference history in kickoff return yards (1,468) and third in kickoff return average (25.3).

== Professional career ==
=== Detroit Lions ===
Dixon was signed as an undrafted free agent by the Detroit Lions after the 1989 NFL draft, who were using the run and shoot offense. He was waived on August 29.

=== Dallas Cowboys ===
On August 30, 1989, he was claimed off waivers by the Dallas Cowboys. As a rookie, he started 7 games after Michael Irvin and Kelvin Martin suffered knee injuries. He registered 24 receptions for 477 yards, a 19.9-yard average (led the team), 1,688 all-purpose yards (ranked 10th in the NFL) and 2 touchdowns.

In the 10th game against the Phoenix Cardinals, he set a franchise rookie record with 203 receiving yards (the fifth highest in club history), including a 75-yard touchdown reception, in the same contest that Troy Aikman set a then-NFL rookie record with 379 passing yards.

His 477 yards were the fourth-most receiving yards by a rookie receiver in team history. The 1,181 kickoff return yards broke Mel Renfro's franchise record of 1,017 set in 1964. His 47 kickoff returns broke Ron Fellows' franchise record of 43 set in 1983. He ranked fifth in the NFL and second in the NFC in kickoff returns with a 25.1-yard average, the highest a Cowboys player has finished since 1971. Against the Kansas City Chiefs, he returned a kickoff for a 97-yard touchdown, becoming the first Cowboy player to return a kickoff for a touchdown since 1975. He added a 90-yard kickoff return against the Green Bay Packers, making him the first player in franchise history with 2 kickoff returns of 90 yards or more in his career.

In 1990, he began the season at wide receiver, before being switched to running back and changing his jersey number to 21. On October 21, he made his debut at backup running back behind rookie Emmitt Smith against the Tampa Bay Buccaneers. He led the team in kickoff returns with 736 yards for a 20.4-yard average.

In 1991, he had 18 kickoff returns for 398 yards (22.1-yard average), becoming the franchise record holder in kickoff returns (101) and kickoff return yards (2,315). He was released on October 17.

=== Fort Worth Cavalry (AFL) ===
In 1994, he signed with the Fort Worth Cavalry of the Arena Football League to play wide receiver/defensive back. He tallied 32 receptions for 405 yards and 9 touchdownss. The team folded after the season.
