= Jimmy Klingler =

American football player and coach (born 1972)

Profile
- Position: Quarterback

Personal information
- Born: February 17, 1972 (age 54); Lima, Ohio, U.S.
- Listed height: 6 ft 3 in (1.91 m)
- Listed weight: 220 lb (100 kg)

Career information
- High school: Stratford (Houston, Texas)
- College: Houston
- NFL draft: 1994: undrafted

Career history

Playing
- Birmingham Barracudas (1995); Texas Terror (1996)

Coaching
- Dickinson HS (1997–2001) (asst.); MacArthur HS (2002) (QB); South Houston HS (2003–2006) (OC); Manvel HS (2007–2012) (OC); New Caney HS (2013) (OC); Blinn (2014–2015) (OC); Galveston Ball HS (2017–2018) (AHC/OC); Pasadena Memorial HS (2019–present) (AHC/OC)

Awards and highlights
- NCAA passing yards leader (1992); Second-team All-SWC (1992)

Career CFL statistics
- Comp. / Att.: 47 / 98
- Passing yards: 645
- TD–INT: 4-7
- Rushing yards: 22

Career AFL statistics
- Comp. / Att.: 45 / 96
- Passing yards: 514
- TD–INT: 7-2
- Passer rating: 73.00
- Stats at ArenaFan.com

James Mark Klingler (born February 17, 1972) is an American football coach and former quarterback. He played college football at the University of Houston, and professionally for the Birmingham Barracudas of the Canadian Football League (CFL) and the Texas Terror of the Arena Football League (AFL). He currently coaches football for Pasadena Memorial High School in Pasadena, Texas.

== Early life and college ==
James Mark Klingler was born on February 17, 1972, in Lima, Ohio. He attended Stratford High School in Houston, Texas.

Klingler played for the Houston Cougars from 1991 to 1993. He led NCAA Division I-A in total offense with 3,768 yards in 1992. He also led Division I-A in total touchdowns and passing touchdowns with 32.

== Professional career ==
Pre-draft measurables
Height	Weight	Arm length	Hand span	40-yard dash	10-yard split	20-yard split	20-yard shuttle	Vertical jump
6 ft 2 1/2 in (1.89 m)	218 lb (99 kg)	32 in (0.81 m)	9 in (0.23 m)	5.03 s	1.74 s	2.93 s	4.45 s	29.5 in (0.75 m)

Klingler played for the Birmingham Barracudas of the Canadian Football League in 1995, recording four touchdowns on 645 passing yards.

Klingler played for the Texas Terror of the Arena Football League in 1996, recording seven touchdowns on 514 passing yards.

== Coaching career ==
Klingler was a coach at Dickinson High School from 1997 to 2001.

Klingler was quarterbacks coach at MacArthur High School in 2002.

Klingler was offensive coordinator at South Houston High School from 2003 to 2006.

Klingler served as offensive coordinator for Manvel High School from 2007 to 2012.

Klingler was offensive coordinator of New Caney High School in 2013.

Klingler became offensive coordinator of the Blinn Buccaneers of Blinn College in 2014.

== Personal life ==
Klingler's brother, David, also played quarterback for the Houston Cougars. His son, Cory, played football for the Rice Owls. His daughter, Baylee, played college softball at Washington.

== See also ==
- List of NCAA major college football yearly passing leaders
- List of NCAA major college football yearly total offense leaders
