= Glenn Montgomery =

American football player (1967–1998)

No. 94, 97
- Position: Defensive tackle

Personal information
- Born: March 31, 1967; New Orleans, Louisiana, U.S.
- Died: June 28, 1998 (aged 31); Dallas, Texas, U.S.
- Listed height: 6 ft 0 in (1.83 m)
- Listed weight: 282 lb (128 kg)

Career information
- High school: West Jefferson (LA)
- College: Houston
- NFL draft: 1989: 5th round, 131st overall pick

Career history
- Houston Oilers (1989–1995); Seattle Seahawks (1996)

Awards and highlights
- First-team All-SWC (1988)

Career NFL statistics
- Tackles: 228
- Sacks: 13.5
- Fumble recoveries: 11
- Stats at Pro Football Reference

Glenn Steven Montgomery (March 31, 1967 – June 28, 1998) was an American professional football defensive tackle in the National Football League (NFL).

== Football career ==
Montgomery grew up in a poverty-stricken area and starred at West Jefferson High School in Harvey, Louisiana. His brother, Sean, a member of the U.S. Junior Olympic wrestling team, developed problems related to schizophrenia. To help his brother, Montgomery accepted a scholarship to Houston, where his 12 sacks during his 1988 senior season was one short of a team record. Concerned about the welfare of his brother, he almost left the school, but he was talked out of it by the coaches.

The 6-foot (1.8 m), 283-pound Montgomery was drafted by the Houston Oilers in the fifth round of the 1989 NFL draft. He became a starter by 1993. Despite his lack of height for his position, Montgomery steadily grew into a defensive force throughout his seven years with Houston.

In 1996, Montgomery was traded from the Oilers to the Seattle Seahawks.

== Death ==
Montgomery was diagnosed with Lou Gehrig's Disease in July 1997 and died of the disease in Dallas, Texas on June 28, 1998. He was 31 years old.

He founded the Glenn Montgomery Foundation, which helped patients coping with the disease.

In the months before his death, Montgomery had been working with a Houston television reporter on a series about the effects of the disease. The Houston Muscle Team Dinner, held shortly after Montgomery died, was dedicated to him. The event attracted more than 450 people and raised $107,000 to benefit MDA programs throughout the Texas Gulf Coast area.
