= David Klingler =

American football player (born 1969)

No. 15, 7, 11
- Position: Quarterback

Personal information
- Born: February 17, 1969 (age 57); Houston, Texas, U.S.
- Listed height: 6 ft 3 in (1.91 m)
- Listed weight: 215 lb (98 kg)

Career information
- High school: Stratford (Houston)
- College: Houston (1987–1991)
- NFL draft: 1992: 1st round, 6th overall pick

Career history
- Cincinnati Bengals (1992–1995); Oakland Raiders (1996–1997); Green Bay Packers (1998)*
- * Offseason or practice squad member only

Awards and highlights
- PFWA All-Rookie Team (1992); Sammy Baugh Trophy (1990); Third-team All-American (1990); SWC Offensive Player of the Year (1990); First-team All-SWC (1990); Second-team All-SWC (1991); Houston Cougars No. 7 retired

Career NFL statistics
- Passing attempts: 718
- Passing completions: 389
- Completion percentage: 52.2%
- TD–INT: 16–22
- Passing yards: 3,994
- Passer rating: 65.1
- Stats at Pro Football Reference

David Ryan Klingler (born February 17, 1969) is an American former professional football player who was a quarterback for six years in the National Football League (NFL) and current Associate Professor of Bible Exposition at Dallas Theological Seminary. He played college football for the Houston Cougars, earning third-team All-American honors in 1990. Klingler was selected in the first round of the 1992 NFL draft by the Cincinnati Bengals, but his career was cut short by an elbow injury.

== College career ==
A 6-foot, 2-inch quarterback, Klingler rewrote numerous college passing records for the Houston Cougars from 1988 to 1991. On November 17, 1990, Klingler threw for an all-Divisions record 11 touchdown passes for a single quarterback against Eastern Washington at the Astrodome (since equaled at the NAIA level by Lee Kirkland of Pikeville in 2024), and on December 2 set the NCAA (Division I) record for most yards gained in a single game, 716 (since surpassed by Connor Halliday in 2014 and later Patrick Mahomes in 2016). In his four seasons at Houston, he completed 726 of 1,262 passes for 9,430 yards and 91 touchdowns, all of which were school records at the time. Klingler set the NCAA record for touchdown passes in a season with 54 in 1990. His single-season touchdown pass record stood for 16 years until it was broken in the 2006 Hawaii Bowl by University of Hawaii quarterback Colt Brennan with 58, though Brennan needed three more games than Klingler to break the record. Klingler made a valiant push to win the Heisman Trophy (following in the footsteps of fellow Cougar Andre Ware) but was eventually beaten by Ty Detmer of BYU and Raghib Ismail (runner-up) of Notre Dame. Klingler remained a stand-out for the University of Houston and still ranks in the FBS top ten for career touchdown passes and yards.

College statistics
Year	Team	GP	Passing						
Year	Team	GP	Cmp	Att	Pct	Yds	TD	Int	Rtg
1988	Houston	3	6	7	85.7	37	0	0	130.1
1989	Houston	8	68	114	59.6	865	8	1	144.8
1990	Houston	11	374	643	58.2	5,140	54	20	146.8
1991	Houston	10	278	497	55.9	3,388	29	17	125.6
Totals		32	726	1,261	57.6	9,430	91	38	138.2

== Professional career ==
Pre-draft measurables
Height	Weight	Arm length	Hand span	40-yard dash	10-yard split	20-yard split	20-yard shuttle	Vertical jump
6 ft 2 1/2 in (1.89 m)	205 lb (93 kg)	33 in (0.84 m)	9 1/4 in (0.23 m)	4.82 s	1.73 s	2.76 s	4.01 s	32.5 in (0.83 m)

Klingler was taken in the first round of the 1992 NFL draft with the sixth overall pick by the Cincinnati Bengals. From 1992 to 1995 he played for the Bengals—starting for the Bengals in 1993 and 1994 before losing his job to Jeff Blake. He then played two seasons as a backup for the Oakland Raiders. In 1998, he signed with the Green Bay Packers to back up Brett Favre, but he was cut and did not play.

Klingler injured his elbow and shoulder in the offseason before his third season. After the 1994 season (his third), he underwent elbow surgery. Being informed that his injury was career ending, he knew that his career was all but done. Before the operation he could heave a ball 85 yards; afterward he struggled to reach 35.

In 2007, Klingler was listed at #10 on the NFL Network's "Top 10 Draft Busts" list.

== After the NFL ==
Klingler entered school at Dallas Theological Seminary, earning both a master's degree in Theology and a Ph.D. in Old Testament studies. In June 2010, he became the director of DTS's Houston extension. On April 15, 2012, Klingler was hired as assistant professor of biblical studies at Southwestern Baptist Theological Seminary's Havard School of Theological Studies in Houston.

Klingler was also an analyst for the University of Houston's football radio network from 2006 to 2008.

== Personal life ==
Klingler's brother Jimmy also played quarterback for the Houston Cougars. His niece, Baylee, played college softball at Washington.

== See also ==
- List of NCAA major college football yearly passing leaders
- List of NCAA major college football yearly total offense leaders
