= Vincent Marshall =

American football player and coach (born 1983)

Jackson State Tigers
- Title: Wide receivers coach

Personal information
- Born: November 12, 1983 (age 42); Ennis, Texas, U.S.
- Listed height: 5 ft 7 in (1.70 m)
- Listed weight: 170 lb (77 kg)

Career information
- College: Houston (2002–2006)
- NFL draft: 2007: undrafted

Career history

Playing
- Atlanta Falcons (2007)*; Saskatchewan Roughriders (2007–2008); Calgary Stampeders (2009)*; Winnipeg Blue Bombers (2010–2012)
- * Offseason or practice squad member only

Coaching
- SAGU (2012) Defensive backs coach; Seguin HS (TX) (2013) Defensive backs coach; Bowling Green (2014–2015) Graduate assistant; Syracuse (2016) Offensive quality control coach; Houston (2017) Analyst; Missouri Southern (2018) Running backs coach; Southern (2020) Wide receivers coach; Norfolk State (2021–2023) Special teams coordinator & wide receivers coach; Jackson State (2024–present) Wide receivers coach

Awards and highlights
- 2× Second-Team All-C-USA (2004, 2006); First-Team All-C-USA (2005); Third-Team All-C-USA (2005); Grey Cup champion (2007)

Vincent Marshall (born November 12, 1983) is an American college football coach and former wide receiver. He is the wide receivers coach for Jackson State University, a position he has held since 2024. Marshall played professionally as a wide receiver in the Canadian Football League (CFL) with the Saskatchewan Roughriders, Calgary Stampeders, and Winnipeg Blue Bombers. He was signed by the Atlanta Falcons of the National Football League (NFL) as an undrafted free agent in 2007. Marshall played college football for Houston.

== College career ==
Marshall played college football for Houston from 2002 to 2006 as a wide receiver. In 2004, he earned second-team All-C-USA. In 2005, he earned first-team All-C-USA as a wide receiver and third-team All-C-USA as a punt returner. In 2006, he earned second-team All-C-USA. He finished his career as the school's all-time leader in receptions, receiving yards, and was third all-time for touchdown catches.

Marshall was also an All-American sprinter for the Houston Cougars track and field team, placing 8th in the 4 × 100 meters relay at the 2006 NCAA Division I Outdoor Track and Field Championships.

== Professional career ==
=== Atlanta Falcons ===
After going undrafted in the 2007 NFL Draft, Marshall signed with the Atlanta Falcons of the National Football League (NFL). He was released on September 2, 2007.

=== Saskatchewan Roughriders ===
In 2007, Marshall signed with the Saskatchewan Roughriders of the Canadian Football League (CFL). He was a member of the 95th Grey Cup championship team.

=== Calgary Stampeders ===
In 2009, Marshall signed with the Calgary Stampeders.

=== Winnipeg Blue Bombers ===
On January 19, 2010, Marshall signed with the Winnipeg Blue Bombers.

== Coaching career ==
In 2012, Marshall was hired as the defensive backs coach for SAGU.

In 2013, Marshall was hired as the defensive backs coach for Seguin High School.

In 2014, Marshall joined Bowling Green as a graduate assistant.

In 2016, Marshall was hired as an offensive quality control coach for Syracuse.

In 2017, Marshall was joined his alma mater, Houston, as an analyst.

In 2018, Marshall was hired as the running backs coach for Missouri Southern. He only held the position for one year.

In 2020, Marshall was hired as the wide receivers coach for Southern.

In 2021, Marshall was hired as the special teams coordinator and wide receivers coach for Norfolk State.

In 2024, Marshall was hired as the wide receivers coach for Jackson State.
