= Jackie Battle =

American football player (born 1983)

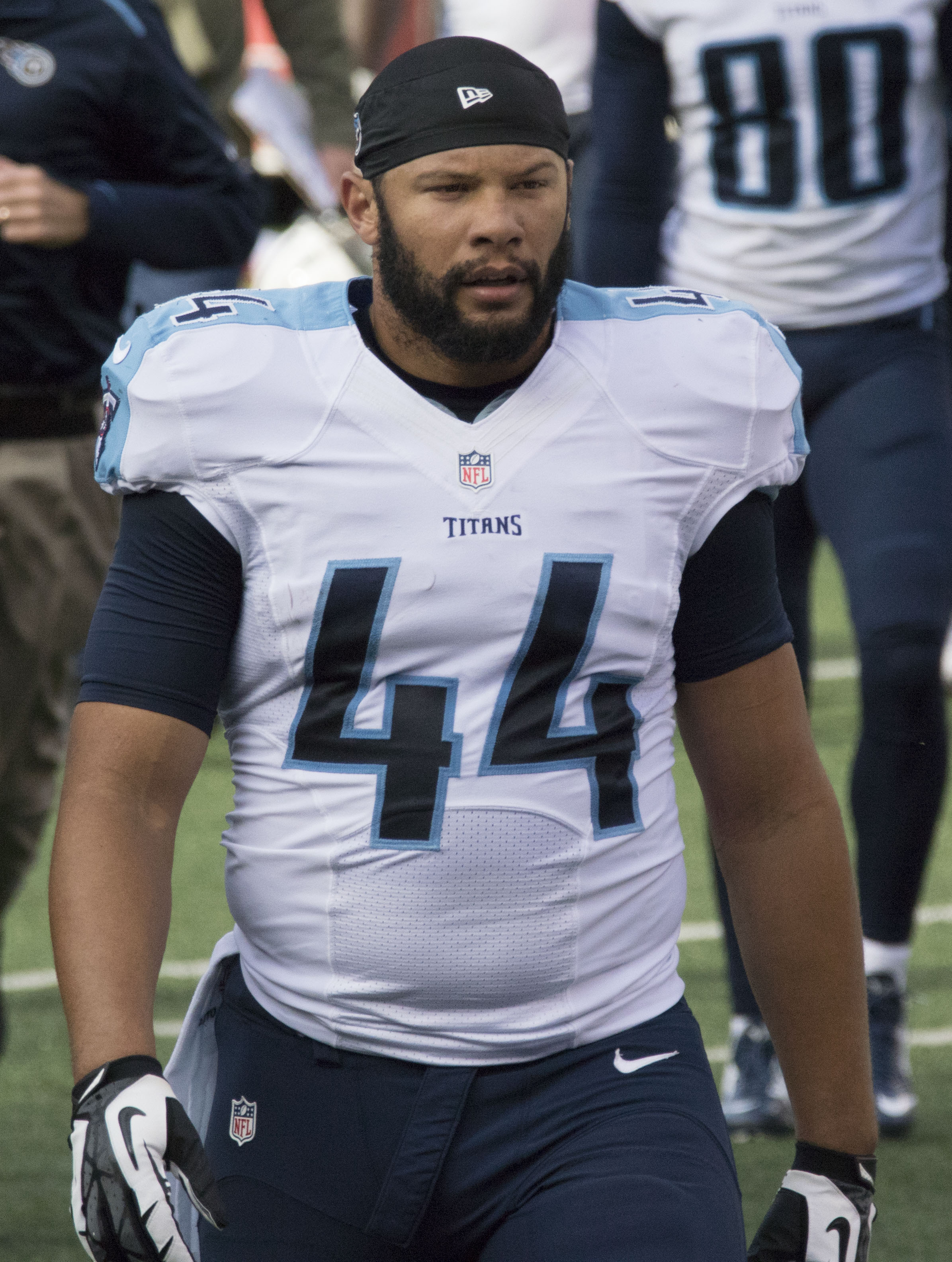
- Battle with the Tennessee Titans in 2014

No. 26, 44, 22
- Position: Running back / Fullback

Personal information
- Born: October 1, 1983 (age 43); Houston, Texas, U.S.
- Listed height: 6 ft 2 in (1.88 m)
- Listed weight: 238 lb (108 kg)

Career information
- High school: Humble (Humble, Texas)
- College: Houston (2002–2006)
- NFL draft: 2007: undrafted

Career history
- Dallas Cowboys (2007)*; Kansas City Chiefs (2007–2011); San Diego Chargers (2012); Tennessee Titans (2013–2014)
- * Offseason or practice squad member only

Awards and highlights
- Third-team All-C-USA (2006)

Career NFL statistics
- Rushing attempts: 326
- Rushing yards: 1,177
- Rushing touchdowns: 9
- Receptions: 38
- Receiving yards: 248
- Receiving touchdowns: 1
- Stats at Pro Football Reference

Ewart Haron "Jackie" Battle III (born October 1, 1983) is an American former professional football player who was a running back in the National Football League (NFL) for the Kansas City Chiefs, San Diego Chargers, and Tennessee Titans. He played college football for the Houston Cougars and was signed as an undrafted free agent by the Dallas Cowboys in 2007.

== Early life ==
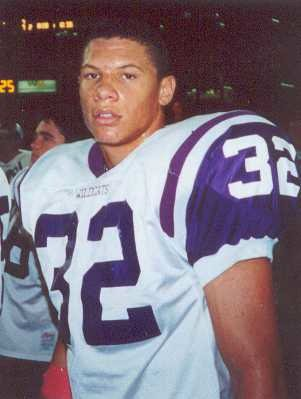
Battle in high school as member of the Humble High School Wildcats.

Battle was born in Humble, Texas, and began his football career as a youth in the Humble Area Football League. He attended Humble High School, where he practiced football and track.

As a senior, he tallied 1,524 rushing yards, 182 receiving yards and 20 touchdowns. He contributed to the team having a 10–3 record and reaching the third round of the UIL playoffs. He was a two-time first-team All-District selection and an all-state running back.

He was ranked by Rivals.com as the 38th best high school running back in America.

== College career ==
Battle accepted a football scholarship from the University of Houston, while majoring in Sports administration. As a redshirt freshman, he appeared in 11 games (no starts); collecting 102 carries for 560 yards (second on the team), a 5.5-yard average and 9 rushing touchdowns (tied for the team lead). In the 2003 Hawaii Bowl he had 19 carries for 124 yards (6.5-yard avg.) and 3 touchdowns.

As a sophomore, he appeared in 5 games (one start). He missed the last 5 contests of the season after tearing a tendon in one of his fingers. He tallied 49 carries for 209 yards (third on the team) and 2 touchdowns.

As a junior, he appeared in 12 games (3 starts). He compiled 106 carries for 408 yards (second on the team) and 5 touchdowns.

As a senior, he formed a potent running back duo with Anthony Alridge. He appeared in 13 games (7 starts). He registered 184 carries for 943 yards (second on the team), 15 rushing touchdowns (school record) and 2 receptions for 13 yards. He had a career-high 3 rushing touchdowns against the University of Central Florida. He had a career-high 136 rushing yards against Southern Methodist University. He was selected to play fullback for the West in the 2007 East-West Shrine Game.

Battle finished his collegiate career with 441 carries for 2,120 yards (4.8 avg.) and a school-record 31 rushing touchdowns. He also had six receptions for 45 yards.

== Professional career ==
Pre-draft measurables
Height	Weight	40-yard dash	10-yard split	20-yard split	20-yard shuttle	Three-cone drill	Vertical jump	Broad jump	Bench press
6 ft 2 in (1.88 m)	235 lb (107 kg)	4.42 s	1.52 s	2.55 s	4.11 s	6.54 s	41 in (1.04 m)	10 ft 11 in (3.33 m)	19 reps
All values from Central Florida Pro Day.

=== Dallas Cowboys ===
Battle was signed as an undrafted free agent by the Dallas Cowboys after the 2007 NFL draft. He couldn't pass running backs Marion Barber III, Julius Jones and Tyson Thompson on the depth chart during training camp. He was waived injured with a sprained ankle on August 27.

=== Kansas City Chiefs ===
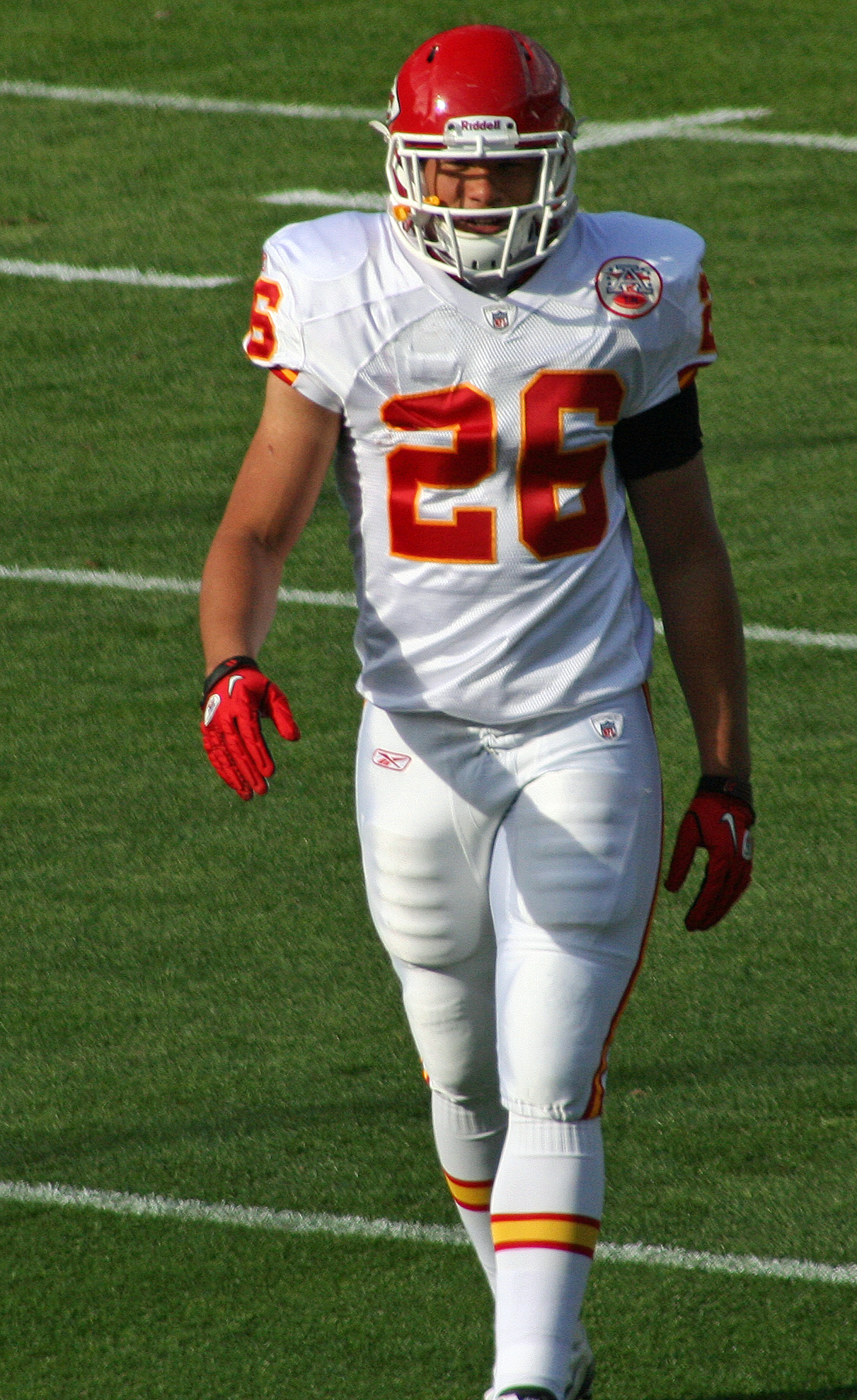
Battle while with the Chiefs in 2010

==== 2007 ====
On November 21, 2007, He was signed by the Kansas City Chiefs to their practice squad. He was promoted to the active roster on December 12.

On December 23, Battle scored a touchdown in his first NFL carry in a 25–20 loss to the Detroit Lions. A week later, on December 30, Battle set a career-high of 44 rushing yards on 13 carries in an OT loss to the New York Jets. As a rookie, he finished with 47 yards on 14 carries.

==== 2008 ====
Battle was released by the Chiefs during the final roster cuts in 2008. Battle was then signed to the practice squad. Battle was made active again on November 1, 2008, to back up Kolby Smith, who was replacing the suspended Larry Johnson. He was cut and re-signed later that month. The only statistics he recorded in the season were two special teams tackles and a −2 yard reception on a screen pass against the Denver Broncos.

==== 2009 ====
In a game against the Dallas Cowboys during week 5 of the 2009 NFL season, Battle suffered a torn rotator cuff in his shoulder while trying to bust a wedge during kick coverage. He underwent surgery and was put on injured reserve, ending his season. Ironically, Larry Johnson, who was at the time the only back ahead of Battle on the depth chart, left the team a mere three weeks later. Battle was re-signed to a 1-year contract the following off-season.

==== 2010 ====
In the 2010 season, Battle came in behind a lot of depth. Jamaal Charles had had a breakout performance to end the 2009 season, and the Chiefs had also recently signed veteran Thomas Jones from the New York Jets, drafted rookie Dexter McCluster from Ole Miss. Battle dominated in the preseason, leading the Chiefs in rushing yards with 180 yards on 35 carries. However, he saw little action to start the regular season. Battle saw his first carries late in the fourth quarter of a week 3 game against the San Francisco 49ers. Later, Battle scored his second career touchdown in the 4th quarter of a 42–20 week 7 rout of the Jacksonville Jaguars. The next week vs. the Buffalo Bills, Battle converted a key 3rd down run during a 13–10 overtime win.

==== 2011 ====
In game 2 of the 2011 season, starter Jamaal Charles went-down with an ACL injury for the year, giving Battle more carries. He got two carries and a critical first-down late in the Chiefs' Week 4 22–17 comeback win over the Minnesota Vikings, their first win of the season. He had a career day the next week, rushing for 119 yards on 19 carries, including a career-long 24-yard carry in a 28–24 comeback win over the Indianapolis Colts. The Colts jumped to a 17–0 lead, but the Chiefs' renewed rushing attack controlled the ball for a full 20:15 in the 2nd half, preventing the Colts from scoring in the final 30:09. In week 16 of the 2011 NFL season, Battle injured his foot during the Chiefs/Raiders game, which eventually would lead to a Chiefs loss and end their playoff hopes. Battle was placed on injured reserve, but would be the Chiefs leading rusher by the end of the season. Battle became a free agent after his contract expired.

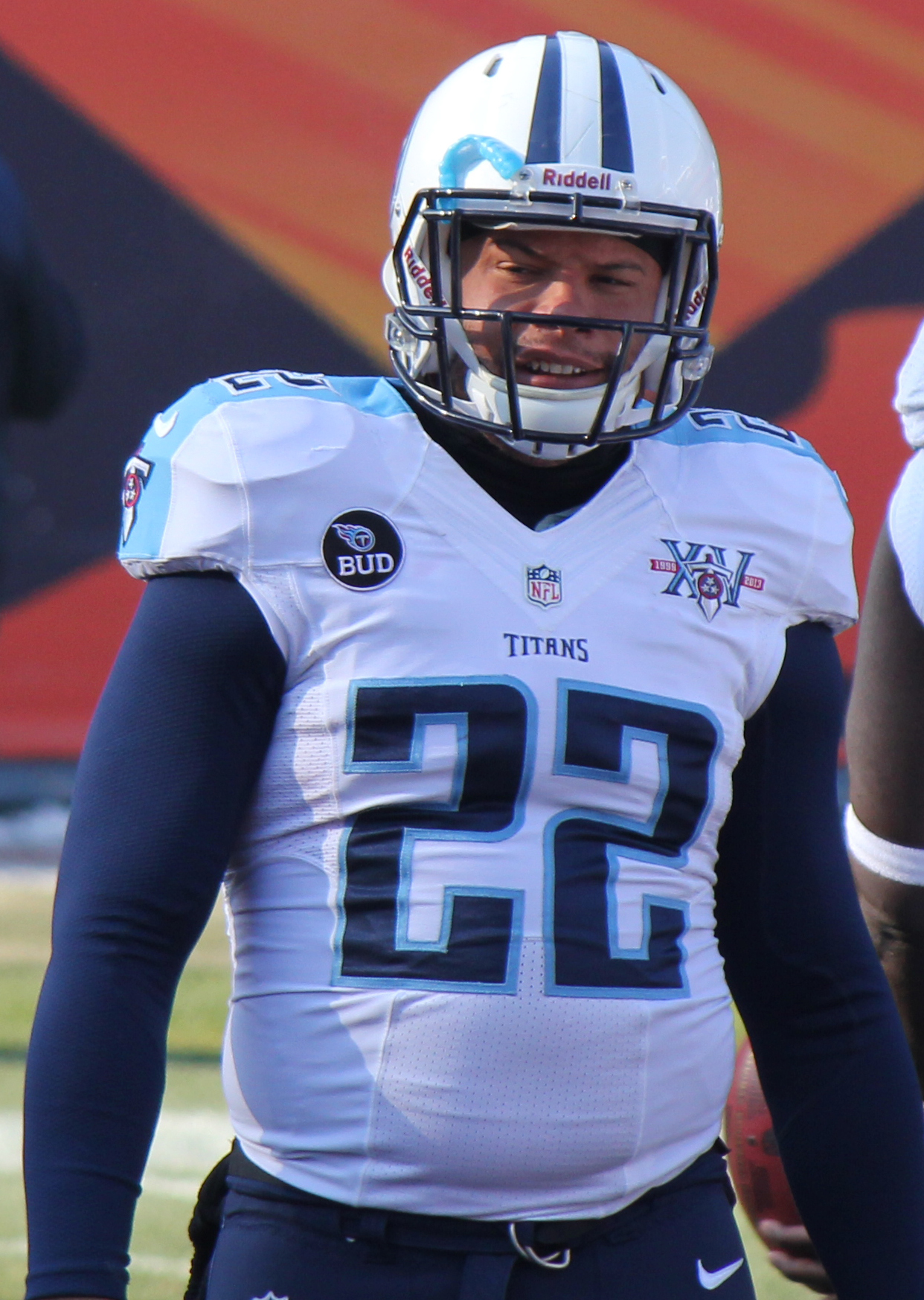
Battle as a member of the Tennessee Titans in 2013

=== San Diego Chargers ===
Battle signed with the San Diego Chargers to a one-year contract on July 20, 2012. He started in Week 4 against the Kansas City Chiefs. He had 15 carries for 39 yards with a team-high four catches for 42 yards.

=== Tennessee Titans ===
==== 2013 ====
On July 24, 2013, Battle signed with the Tennessee Titans on a one-year contract. He was fined $21,000 for lowering the crown of his helmet while running a route against the Houston Texans on September 20, 2013. He was the first running back in the league to be fined under this newly implemented rule, however under further investigation, the fine was retracted.

==== 2014 ====
Battle re-signed with the Titans on a one-year deal on February 25, 2014. It was announced that he would be learning the fullback position to provide competition to Collin Mooney. He was not re-signed after the season.

Battle retired in 2015, finishing his career with 326 carries and zero fumbles, the fourth highest amount of carries without a fumble in NFL history.

== Personal life ==
After retiring from football, Battle and his wife opened up a charity clothing store called Philanthropy in The Woodlands, Texas.
