= Jason Phillips (wide receiver) =

American gridiron football player and coach (born 1966)

Colorado Buffaloes
- Title: Wide receivers coach

Personal information
- Born: October 11, 1966 (age 60); Crowley, Louisiana, U.S.
- Listed height: 5 ft 7 in (1.70 m)
- Listed weight: 166 lb (75 kg)

Career information
- High school: Sterling (Houston, Texas)
- College: Houston
- NFL draft: 1989: 10th round, 253rd overall pick

Career history

Playing
- Detroit Lions (1989–1990); Atlanta Falcons (1991–1994); Birmingham Barracudas (1995); Hamilton Tiger-Cats (1996–1997)

Coaching
- Houston Marshals (WR, 1999–2000); Houston (Off. Asst., 2001); Texas State (WR, 2002); Houston (WR/CB, 2003–2006); Baylor (Inside Rec., 2007); Houston (Co-OC/WR/Recruit, 2008–2011); SMU (Co-OC/WR, 2012–2014); Kansas (WR, 2016); Oregon State (WR/PGC, 2017); Utah State (WR/PGC, 2019–2020); Jackson State (Co-OC/WR, 2021); Hamilton Tiger-Cats (WR, 2022–2023); Colorado (WR, 2024–present)

Awards and highlights
- CFL South All-Star (1995); Consensus All-American (1988); SWC Co-Offensive Player of the Year (1988); 2× First-team All-SWC (1987, 1988); SWC Newcomer of the Year (1987); Member of the SWC's All-Decade Team of the 1980s

Career NFL statistics
- Receptions: 49
- Receiving yards: 578
- Receiving touchdowns: 2
- Stats at Pro Football Reference

Jason Howell Phillips (born October 11, 1966) is an American football coach and former player who is the wide receivers coach for the Colorado Buffaloes of the Big 12 Conference. He played professionally as a wide receiver in the National Football League (NFL) for the Detroit Lions and Atlanta Falcons. He played college football for the Houston Cougars, earning All-American honors in 1988.

== Early life ==
Phillips attended Ross Sterling High School, where he received All-District and All-Greater Houston honors as a senior quarterback. After high school he joined Taft Junior College, receiving All-Conference honors as a freshman quarterback. He was converted into a wide receiver as a sophomore. In 1987, he transferred to the University of Houston to play under new head coach Jack Pardee. He tallied 99 receptions (led the nation) for 875 yards (led the conference) and 3 touchdowns.

In 1988, the Cougars were employing the run and shoot offense with Andre Ware at quarterback and James Dixon as the second wide receiver. Phillips led the nation in receptions (108), receiving yards (1,444) and receiving touchdowns (15).

Phillips and Dixon also became the first teammates in school history to register 1,000-receiving yards seasons in the same year. They are also the only wide receiver unit in NCAA history to each record over 100 receptions and rank 1–2 in the nation in receiving in the same season.

In 2006, Phillips was selected to the Southwest Conference All-Decade Team for the 1980s. In 2006, he was inducted into the Houston Hall of Honor.

== Professional career ==
Phillips was selected by the Detroit Lions in the tenth round (253rd overall) of the 1989 NFL draft, who were using the run and shoot offense. He set a franchise rookie record with 10 receptions for 155 yards against the Tampa Bay Buccaneers.

On April 1, 1991, the Atlanta Falcons signed Phillips as a Plan B free agent, who were using the run and shoot offense. He played there for 3 seasons under head coach Jerry Glanville and offensive coordinator June Jones. He was released on August 23, 1994.

In 1995, Phillips reunited with Pardee, his former college coach, in the Canadian Football League with the Birmingham Barracudas and was named to the South All-Star Team. In 1996, he was signed by the Hamilton Tiger-Cats. In two seasons, he posted 136 receptions for 2,029 yards and 16 touchdowns.

== Coaching career ==
On Sunday, December 20, 2015, the University of Kansas announced the hiring of Phillips as their new WR coach.

In October 2018, Phillips joined the Salt Lake Stallions of the newly-formed Alliance of American Football as the WR coach.

On February 7, 2022, it was announced that Phillips had joined the coaching staff of the Hamilton Tiger-Cats as the team's wide receivers coach.

In 2024, Phillips joined the Colorado Buffaloes as the WR coach. He is of one of the many new coaches brought in by Coach Prime (Deion Sanders) for the 2024 season.

== See also ==
- List of NCAA major college football yearly receiving leaders
