= Brandon Middleton =

American football player and coach (born 1981)

No. 10
- Position: Wide receiver

Personal information
- Born: January 2, 1981 (age 45); Waterloo, Iowa, U.S.
- Listed height: 5 ft 10 in (1.78 m)
- Listed weight: 190 lb (86 kg)

Career information
- College: Houston
- NFL draft: 2004: undrafted

Career history
- Dallas Cowboys (2004)*; St. Louis Rams (2004–2006)*; Berlin Thunder (2006); Rhein Fire (2006); Frankfurt Galaxy (2007); Detroit Lions (2007–2008); Hamilton Tiger-Cats (2009)*
- * Offseason or practice squad member only

Awards and highlights
- All-Conference USA (2003)

Career NFL statistics
- Receptions: 9
- Receiving yards: 93
- Receiving touchdowns: 1
- Stats at Pro Football Reference
- Stats at CFL.ca (archive)

Brandon Anthony Middleton (born January 2, 1981) is an American former professional football player who was a wide receiver in the National Football League (NFL). Middleton was signed by the Dallas Cowboys as an undrafted free agent in 2004. After playing college football for the Houston Cougars, he played five seasons in the NFL, including the final two with the Detroit Lions. His top game in "Motown" came on Dec. 16, 2007, at San Diego when Middleton made four grabs for 32 yards and a nine-yard touchdown reception.

== Early life ==
Middleton played wide receiver for the Alief Elsik Rams - a suburb of west Houston in Texas - under head coach Bill Barron and wide receiver coach Daniel McKamie during high school. He once had a 101-yard kick off return and was the leading receiver in both catches, yards and TD's. He was also the strongest skills position player on the team at that time and once squatted 415 pounds. Middleton was also a letter man in football and track.

== Professional career ==
=== Detroit Lions ===
Middleton was cut by the Lions on September 12, 2007. Due to an injury to starting wide receiver Roy Williams late in the 2007 season, Middleton was added from the practice squad. On December 15, 2007 in a game against the San Diego Chargers, Middleton caught his first career touchdown on a pass from quarterback Jon Kitna.

Middleton was released by the Lions during final cuts on August 30, 2008. He was re-signed on September 9 after tight end Dan Campbell was placed on injured reserve. Middleton was released by the Lions on November 11, 2008 and replaced by John Standeford.

=== Hamilton Tiger-Cats ===
Middleton was signed to the Hamilton Tiger-Cats practice roster on September 16, 2009. He was released on October 4.

== Coaching career ==
Middleton was named outside receivers coach for his alma mater Houston Cougars in February, 2011. Middleton was hired by Houston head coach Tony Levine after helping Evangel Christian Academy to the Louisiana Class 2A state playoffs in 2011 and the state championship in 2010. During the 2010 championship run, Middleton's top three receivers combined for 148 catches, 2,386 yards and 30 touchdowns as Evangel went 12–2. In 2016 Middleton came to Little Rock Christian Academy to be offensive coordinator of the Warriors. In the 2018 season, he coached the team to a 9–1 season and the Arkansas 5A state championship.

Middleton was also the offensive coordinator at Royal High School in Brookshire, Texas.

== See also ==
- List of NCAA major college football yearly receiving leaders
