= Anthony Alridge =

American football player (born 1984)

No. 38,39
- Position: Running back

Personal information
- Born: November 24, 1984 (age 41); Fort Worth, Texas, U.S.
- Listed height: 5 ft 9 in (1.75 m)
- Listed weight: 175 lb (79 kg)

Career information
- High school: Denton (Denton, Texas)
- College: Houston
- NFL draft: 2008: undrafted

Career history
- Denver Broncos (2008); Washington Redskins (2009)*; Houston Texans (2009)*; Washington Redskins (2009); Toronto Argonauts (2010)
- * Offseason or practice squad member only

Awards and highlights
- 2× Second-team All-C-USA (2006, 2007)

Anthony Eugene Alridge (born November 24, 1984) is a former professional gridiron football running back. He was signed by the Denver Broncos as an undrafted free agent in 2008. He played college football at Houston.

Alridge was also a member of the Houston Texans, the Washington Redskins and the Toronto Argonauts.

== Early life ==
Alridge was born to Vincent and Lisa Alridge in Fort Worth, Texas, where he grew up. He is the oldest son with two sisters and a younger brother. His father is the pastor of Friendly Fellowship Church of God in Christ in Fort Worth, Texas where Anthony grew up playing the drums for his church.

Alridge played for the Denton High School football team as an all-purpose back. During his time at Denton, Alridge was named Honorable Mention AP 4A All-State, selected to the Max Emfinger Texas Super All-State Team, picked Texas Sports Writers Association Third-team, All-State and named District 6-4A Offensive Player-of-the-Year.

== College career ==
Alridge chose to attend the University of Houston where he was redshirted as a freshman; he was initially recruited as a wide receiver.

He was not enrolled at the university for the 2004 season and sat out the year. In 2005, as a wide receiver, he appeared in all 12 games, starting six games. He was the Cougars leading receiver at yards per catch with an average of 22.7. During this season, the Cougars played in the Fort Worth Bowl.

Alridge was approached after the 2005 season and asked if he would be interested in playing significant time at running back. Alridge agreed and finished the 2006 season with 959 rushing yards and eight touchdowns on only 95 attempts for an NCAA Division I-A leading rushing average of 10.1 yards per attempt. The Cougars went on to earn a Conference USA championship, and played against the SEC's South Carolina Gamecocks in the 2006 Liberty Bowl.

As a junior, Alridge shared time at running back with the Cougars' senior Jackie Battle. Battle and Alridge combined for 1,762 rushing yards and 21 touchdowns during the 2006 regular season. After Battle graduated and signed a free-agent contract with the Kansas City Chiefs, Alridge assumed the bulk of the running back duties for Houston in 2007 and rushed for 1,597 yards on 259 carries (a 6.2 per-carry average) and scored 14 rushing touchdowns. He also caught 19 passes for 274 yards (a 14.4 average) and five touchdowns.

== Professional career ==
=== Denver Broncos ===
On April 27, 2008, Alridge signed a contract with the Denver Broncos as a free agent. He was put on the injured reserve by the Broncos following the 53-man cut, ending his season. The Broncos waived him on February 11, 2009.

=== First stint with Redskins ===
Alridge was claimed off waivers by the Washington Redskins on February 12, 2009. He was waived on September 5.

=== Houston Texans ===
Alridge was signed to the Houston Texans practice squad on September 16, 2009.

=== Second stint with Redskins ===
Alridge was re-signed by the Washington Redskins from the Houston Texans' practice squad on September 22, 2009 after offensive lineman Randy Thomas was placed on injured reserve. He was released on October 20, 2009. On December 9, 2009, he was re-signed to the practice squad.

After his contract expired following the 2009 season, Alridge was re-signed to a future contract on January 6, 2010.

On May 3, 2010, Alridge was waived by the Redskins for the third time.

=== Toronto Argonauts ===
On September 16, 2010, Alridge was signed by the Toronto Argonauts of the Canadian Football League to a practice roster agreement. On November 22, 2010, he was released by the Argonauts. While with the Argonauts, Alridge played in three regular season games, rushing for 47 yards on 13 carries and catching two passes for three yards.

== Personal life ==
Alridge graduated from Denton High School in 2003. He majored in sociology at University of Houston and graduated in 2007. Alridge and his wife Lauren reside in Houston, Texas.

== See also ==
- List of college football yearly rushing leaders
