= 2012 Beef 'O' Brady's Bowl =

- 5th Beef 'O' Brady's Bowl
Ball State Cardinals	UCF Knights
(9–3)	(9–4)
MAC	C-USA
17	38
Head coach: Pete Lembo	Head coach: George O'Leary
	1	2	3	4	Total
Ball State	0	7	3	7	17
UCF	13	15	7	3	38
- Date: December 21, 2012
- Season: 2012
- Stadium: Tropicana Field
- Location: St. Petersburg, Florida
- MVP: Blake Bortles
- Favorite: UCF by 7
- Referee: Tony Backert (Sun Belt)
- Attendance: 21,759
- Payout: US$1 million per team

United States TV coverage
- Network: ESPN
- Announcers: Dave Neal (Play by Play); Desmond Howard (Analyst); Andre Ware (Analyst); Cara Capuano (Sidelines)

The 2012 Beef 'O' Brady's Bowl, the fifth edition of the game formerly known as the St. Petersburg Bowl, was a post-season American college football bowl game, held on December 21, 2012 at Tropicana Field in St. Petersburg, Florida, as part of the 2012–13 NCAA Bowl season.

The game, broadcast at 7:30 p.m. ET on ESPN, featured the UCF Knights from Conference USA and Ball State Cardinals from the Mid-American Conference. It was the final game of the 2012 NCAA Division I FBS football season for both teams. The Knights advanced to the game after losing to the Tulsa Golden Hurricane in the Conference USA Championship Game.

== Teams ==
Since the game's inception in 2008, the Beef 'O' Brady's Bowl has had its current setup with a team from Conference USA playing a team from the Big East Conference. Ball State was chosen as a replacement for the potential Big East team, because the conference did not have enough bowl-eligible teams to send a representative to St. Petersburg.

This was the fourth meeting between these two teams. The all-time record is tied 2-2. The last time they played was in 2004, when UCF was with Ball State in the MAC (UCF was a football-only member of the MAC).

=== UCF ===
Initially, the Knights were ineligible for the postseason because of recruiting violations in both football and basketball under previous athletic director Keith Tribble. Almost immediately afterwards, the university appealed; because its hearing was delayed until 2013, the Knights were bowl-eligible for 2012. Finishing as C-USA East Division Champions with a 7–1 conference record, the Knights would go on to the Conference USA Championship Game for the fourth time in eight years. After losing to Tulsa 33–27 in overtime, the Knights advanced to the Beef 'O' Brady's Bowl per the C-USA's bowl contingency plan.

This was the Knights' second Beef 'O' Brady's Bowl, they had previously played in the 2009 game, losing to the Rutgers Scarlet Knights by a score of 45–24. It was also the Knights' final game as a member of Conference USA before they move to the American Athletic Conference in 2013.

=== Ball State ===
Ball State entered the game with 9–3 record, losing only to Clemson, Kent State and BCS-buster Northern Illinois. It was the Cardinals first bowl game since the 2009 GMAC Bowl.

== Game summary ==
=== Scoring summary ===
Scoring summary

Quarter	Time	Drive			Team	Scoring information	Score	
Quarter	Time	Plays	Yards	TOP	Team	Scoring information	Ball State	UCF
1	7:27	13	78	7:33	UCF	Latavius Murray 7-yard touchdown reception from Blake Bortles, Shawn Moffitt kick good	0	7
1	3:59	7	58	2:34	UCF	Latavius Murray 2-yard touchdown run, Shawn Moffitt kick no good (blocked)	0	13
2	10:41	10	82	4:19	Ball St.	Willie Snead IV 7-yard touchdown reception from Keith Wenning, Steven Schott kick good	7	13
2	5:50	9	75	4:51	UCF	Blake Bortles 6-yard touchdown run, 2-point pass good	7	21
2	0:05	6	80	0:55	UCF	Latavius Murray 5-yard touchdown reception from Blake Bortles, Shawn Moffitt kick good	7	28
3	7:54	10	49	4:14	Ball St.	45-yard field goal by Steven Schott	10	28
3	4:23	7	50	3:31	UCF	J.J. Worton 7-yard touchdown reception from Blake Bortles, Shawn Moffitt kick good	10	35
4	10:12	12	72	5:26	UCF	25-yard field goal by Shawn Moffitt	10	38
4	5:26	11	76	4:46	Ball St.	Willie Snead IV 16-yard touchdown reception from Keith Wenning, Steven Schott kick good	17	38
"TOP" = time of possession. For other American football terms, see Glossary of American football.							17	38

=== Statistics ===
Statistics	BALL	UCF
First downs	22	29
Total offense, plays - yards	59-286	74-495
Rushes-yards (net)	24-68	42-224
Passing yards (net)	218	271
Passes, Comp-Att-Int	22-35-0	22-32-0
Time of Possession	24:26	35:34
