= 2012 UCF Knights football team =

American college football season

2012 UCF Knights football

C-USA East Division co-champion Beef 'O' Brady's Bowl champion

C-USA Championship, L 27–33 ^{OT} vs. Tulsa

Beef 'O' Brady's Bowl, W 38–17 vs. Ball State
- Conference: Conference USA
- East Division
- Record: 10–4 (7–1 C-USA)
- Head coach: George O'Leary (9th season)
- Offensive coordinator: Charlie Taaffe (4th season)
- Offensive scheme: Pro-style
- Defensive coordinator: Jim Fleming (1st season)
- Base defense: 4–3
- Home stadium: Bright House Networks Stadium

2012 Conference USA football standings
	Conf.			Overall
Team	W		L	W		L
East Division
UCF xy	7	–	1	10	–	4
East Carolina x	7	–	1	8	–	5
Marshall	4	–	4	5	–	7
Memphis	4	–	4	4	–	8
UAB	2	–	6	3	–	9
Southern Miss	0	–	8	0	–	12
West Division
Tulsa xy$	7	–	1	11	–	3
SMU	5	–	3	7	–	6
Rice	4	–	4	7	–	6
Houston	4	–	4	5	–	7
UTEP	2	–	6	3	–	9
Tulane	2	–	6	2	–	10
Championship: Tulsa 33, UCF 27
$ – Conference champion; x – Division champion/co-champions; y – Championship game participant; Rankings from AP Poll

The 2012 UCF Knights football team represented the University of Central Florida in the 2012 NCAA Division I FBS football season. The Knights played in the Eastern Division of Conference USA and played their home games at Bright House Networks Stadium in Orlando, Florida. The Knights were led by head coach George O'Leary, who was in his ninth season with the team.

The 2012 season marked UCF's last as a member of Conference USA, as the Knights moved to the American Athletic Conference in 2013. UCF was originally barred from postseason play for the season due to recruiting violations in both football and basketball under previous athletic director Keith Tribble. The university had its appeal delayed until 2013 and was bowl-eligible for 2012. For the fourth time as C-USA members, UCF won the Conference USA Eastern Division, though the Knights lost the Conference USA Championship game to Tulsa. As a result, the Knights appeared in the Beef 'O' Brady's Bowl, in which they defeated Ball State, 38–17, for the second bowl victory in program history. The Knights finished the season receiving votes both in the AP and Coaches polls.

All games were broadcast live on the UCF-IMG radio network. The Knights' flagship station was WYGM "740 The Game" in Orlando.

== Personnel ==
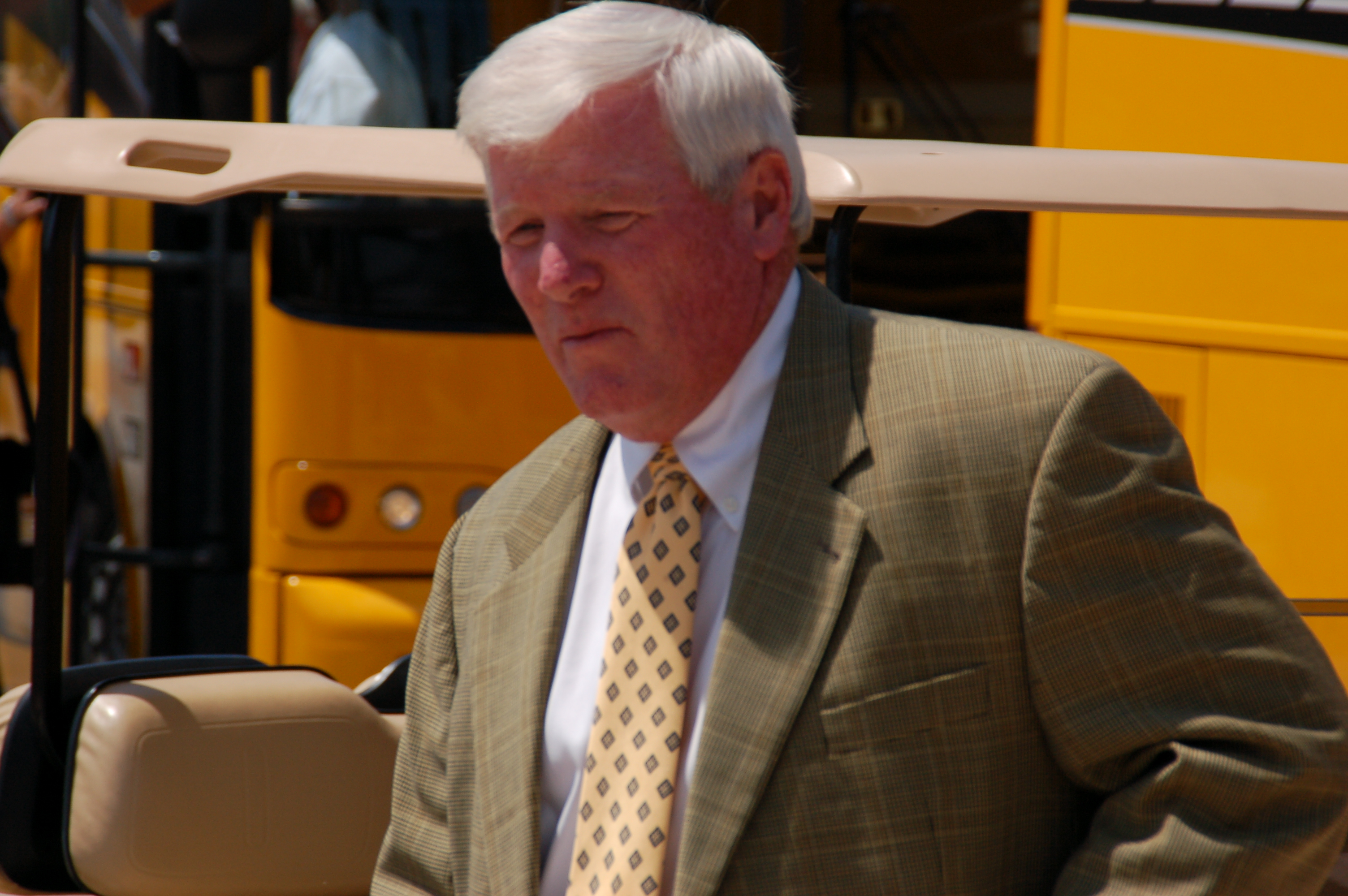
Head Coach George O'Leary

=== Coaching staff ===
2012 UCF Knights coaching staff
Head coaches: Head coach – George O'Leary; Offensive coaches: Offensive coordinator/quarterbacks – Charlie Taaffe; Running backs – Danny Barrett; Wide receivers – Sean Beckton; Offensive line – Brent Key; Graduate assistant – Jonathon Ford; Defensive coaches: Defensive coordinator/linebackers – Jim Fleming; Defensive backs – Kirk Callahan; Defensive line – Blaise Winter; Defensive assistant – Tyson Summers; Graduate assistant – Mark Cammack	Special teams: Special teams coordinator/tight ends – Allen Mogridge; Administrative staff: Athletic Director (A.D.) – Todd Stansbury; Assistant A.D. for Football Operations – Marty O'Leary; Director of player personnel – Drew Hughes

=== Roster ===
2012 UCF Knights roster
2012 Roster from the University of Central Florida Knights
Quarterbacks: 3 Tyler Gabbert – (redshirt) sophomore; 5 Blake Bortles – (redshirt) sophomore; 7 Troy Green – freshman; 11 Mitchell Bourne – (redshirt) freshman; Halfbacks: 13 Dontravius Floyd – (redshirt) senior; 40 Brendan Kelly – (redshirt) senior; Fullbacks: 32 Billy Giovanetti – (redshirt) senior; Running backs: 8 Storm Johnson – (redshirt) sophomore; 17 Cedric Thompson – (redshirt) freshman; 23 Ariel Hoffman – (redshirt) sophomore; 24 Blake Tiralosi – freshman; 28 Latavius Murray – (redshirt) senior; 34 Brynn Harvey – (redshirt) senior; 44 Joseph Puopolo – (redshirt) freshman; 45 Daron Humphrey – freshman; Wide receivers: 2 Jeffrey Godfrey (QB) – junior; 4 Rob Calabrese (QB) – (redshirt) senior; 6 Rannell Hall – sophomore; 9 J.J. Worton – (redshirt) sophomore; 14 Quincy McDuffie – senior; 19 Joshua Reese – (redshirt) sophomore; 20 Taylor Oldham – freshman; 22 Christopher Nahat – (redshirt) sophomore; 25 Dareen Owi – freshman; 31 Jared Greenaway – (redshirt) junior; 80 Drico Johnson – freshman; 81 Breshad Perriman – freshman; 89 Jacques Mackeroy – (redshirt) freshman	Tight ends: 39 Kevin Garvy (redshirt) Senior; 82 Blake Davis – freshman; 84 Justin Tukes – sophomore; 85 Kevin Miller – (redshirt) freshman; 86 D.J. Brown – (redshirt) junior; 88 Cal Bloom – freshman; 88 Chris Martin – (redshirt) junior; Offensive line: 61 Tarik Cook – (redshirt) freshman; 62 Rey Cunha – (redshirt) junior; 63 Jordan McCray – junior; 64 Justin McCray – junior; 65 Kelly Parfitt – freshman; 67 Robert Gibbons – freshman; 68 Theo Goins – (redshirt) senior; 70 Daniel Mcgrattan – freshman; 71 Michael Wiszowaty – (redshirt) freshman; 72 Torrian Wilson – (redshirt) sophomore; 73 Jordan Rae – (redshirt) senior; 74 Michael Campbell – freshman; 75 Phil Smith – (redshirt) senior; 76 Colby Watson – freshman; 77 Kelly Davison – (redshirt) junior; 79 Tony Jacob – (redshirt) sophomore; Linebackers: 11 Jonathan Davis – senior; 16 Mark Rucker – freshman; 23 Willie Mitchell – sophomore; 41 Terrance Plummer – sophomore; 42 Stanley Sylverain – freshman; 46 Ray Shipman – (redshirt) senior; 50 Domenic Spencer – freshman; 51 D.J. Williams – (redshirt) senior; 52 Maurice Russell – freshman; 53 Tyler Linde – freshman; 56 Cody Ralston – (redshirt) sophomore; 57 Troy Gray – sophomore	Defensive line: 44 Miles Pace – (redshirt) freshman; 47 Deion Green – (redshirt) freshman; 48 David Nelson – freshman; 49 Cam Henderson – senior; 58 Troy Davis – senior; 69 Thomas Niles – (redshirt) freshman; 90 Micah Anderson – freshman; 91 Victor Gray – (redshirt) junior; 92 Luke Adams – freshman; 93 Josh Wofford – (redshirt) junior; 94 Demetris Anderson – sophomore; 95 E.J. Dunston – junior; 96 Andrew Rice – (redshirt) sophomore; 97 Chester Brown – freshman; 98 Joey Grant – (redshirt) freshman; 99 Jose Jose – junior; Defensive backs: 10 Jordan Ozerities – (redshirt) sophomore; 12 Jacoby Glenn – freshman; 15 Michael Easton – sophomore; 18 Kemal Ishmael – senior; 21 A. J. Bouye – senior; 22 Jared Henry – freshman; 24 Jeremy Davis – freshman; 25 Brendin Straubel – (redshirt) freshman; 26 Clayton Geathers – (redshirt) sophomore; 27 Sean Beckton – (redshirt) sophomore; 28 Connor Price – (redshirt) sophomore; 29 Lyle Dankenbring – (redshirt) senior; 30 Nicco Whigham – freshman; 33 Jamar McClain – (redshirt) sophomore; 35 Sean Maag – sophomore; 36 Woodley Cadet – (redshirt) sophomore; 37 Brandon Alexander – sophomore; 38 Bruce Dukes – sophomore	Punters/Kickers: 18 Rodrigo Quirarte – (redshirt) sophomore; 35 Sean Galvin – (redshirt) sophomore; 43 Jamie Boyle – senior; 48 Caleb Houston – freshman; 83 Shawn Moffitt – sophomore; Snappers: 54 Greg Marsil – freshman; 56 Scott Teal – (redshirt) sophomore; 59 Matt Morrison – (redshirt) junior; Terms: Freshman – A player in his first year.; Sophomore – A player in his second year.; Junior – A player in his third year.; Senior – A player in his fourth year.; Redshirt – A player who sat out a previous season.

=== Recruiting class ===
College recruiting (2012)
Name	Hometown	School	Height	Weight	Commit date
Luke Adams; DE	Pensacola, FL	Catholic	6 ft 4 in (1.93 m)	250 lb (110 kg)	Oct 12, 2011
Luke Adams; DE	Recruit ratings: Scout: Rivals: (76)				
Cal Bloom; TE	Osseo, MN	Osseo	6 ft 5 in (1.96 m)	235 lb (107 kg)	Jan 22, 2012
Cal Bloom; TE	Recruit ratings: Scout: Rivals: (45)				
Chester Brown; OL	Hinesville, GA	Bradwell Institute	6 ft 5 in (1.96 m)	340 lb (150 kg)	Jan 29, 2012
Chester Brown; OL	Recruit ratings: Scout: Rivals: (75)				
Mike Campbell; OL	Pace, FL	Pace	6 ft 6 in (1.98 m)	252 lb (114 kg)	Jan 10, 2012
Mike Campbell; OL	Recruit ratings: Scout: Rivals: (45)				
Blake Davis; TE	Delray Beach, FL	American Heritage School	6 ft 5 in (1.96 m)	225 lb (102 kg)	Oct 17, 2011
Blake Davis; TE	Recruit ratings: Scout: Rivals: (75)				
Jeremy Davis; CB	New Berlin, NY	Milford Academy	6 ft 0 in (1.83 m)	170 lb (77 kg)	Feb 1, 2012
Jeremy Davis; CB	Recruit ratings: Scout: Rivals:				
Tyler Gabbert; QB	Ballwin, MO	Missouri	6 ft 0 in (1.83 m)	200 lb (91 kg)	Jan 16, 2012
Tyler Gabbert; QB	Recruit ratings: Scout: Rivals: (76)				
Jacoby Glenn; DB	Mobile, AL	Vigor	6 ft 1 in (1.85 m)	175 lb (79 kg)	Jan 19, 2012
Jacoby Glenn; DB	Recruit ratings: Scout: Rivals: (76)				
Troy Green; QB	Skaneateles, NY	Skaneateles Senior	6 ft 1 in (1.85 m)	200 lb (91 kg)	Jan 23, 2012
Troy Green; QB	Recruit ratings: Scout: Rivals: (45)				
Jared Henry; S	Jacksonville, FL	First Coast High School	6 ft 1 in (1.85 m)	190 lb (86 kg)	Jan 2, 2012
Jared Henry; S	Recruit ratings: Scout: Rivals:				
Drico Johnson; WR	Orlando, FL	Agape Christian Academy	6 ft 2 in (1.88 m)	200 lb (91 kg)	Aug 2, 2011
Drico Johnson; WR	Recruit ratings: Scout: Rivals: (76)				
Taylor Oldham; WR	Daytona Beach, FL	Warner Christian Academy	6 ft 1 in (1.85 m)	195 lb (88 kg)	Jun 14, 2011
Taylor Oldham; WR	Recruit ratings: Scout: Rivals: (74)				
Dareen Owi; WR	Miami, FL	Miami Norland	6 ft 3 in (1.91 m)	200 lb (91 kg)	Jan 5, 2012
Dareen Owi; WR	Recruit ratings: Scout: Rivals: (71)				
Kelly Parfitt; OL	Delray Beach, FL	American Heritage School	6 ft 6 in (1.98 m)	290 lb (130 kg)	Oct 31, 2011
Kelly Parfitt; OL	Recruit ratings: Scout: Rivals: (72)				
Phil Smith; OT	Tampa Bay, FL	Georgia Tech	6 ft 5 in (1.96 m)	290 lb (130 kg)	Oct 9, 2011
Phil Smith; OT	Recruit ratings: Scout: Rivals:				
Stanley Sylverain; LB	Naples, FL	Golden Gate	6 ft 3 in (1.91 m)	215 lb (98 kg)	Oct 9, 2011
Stanley Sylverain; LB	Recruit ratings: Scout: Rivals: (73)				
Colby Watson; OL	Pensacola, FL	Pine Forest	6 ft 6 in (1.98 m)	320 lb (150 kg)	Jan 15, 2012
Colby Watson; OL	Recruit ratings: Scout: Rivals: (79)				
Nicco Whigham; DB	Fort Lauderdale, FL	Cardinal Gibbons	6 ft 1 in (1.85 m)	195 lb (88 kg)	Jan 17, 2012
Nicco Whigham; DB	Recruit ratings: Scout: Rivals: (72)				
Overall recruit ranking: Scout: 119
Note: In many cases, Scout, Rivals, 247Sports, On3, and ESPN may conflict in their listings of height and weight.; In these cases, the average was taken. ESPN grades are on a 100-point scale.; Sources: "UCF 2012 Football Commitments". Rivals.; "2012 UCF Football Commits". Scout.; "ESPN". ESPN.; "Scout.com Team Recruiting Rankings". Scout.; "2012 Team Ranking". Rivals.com.

== Schedule ==
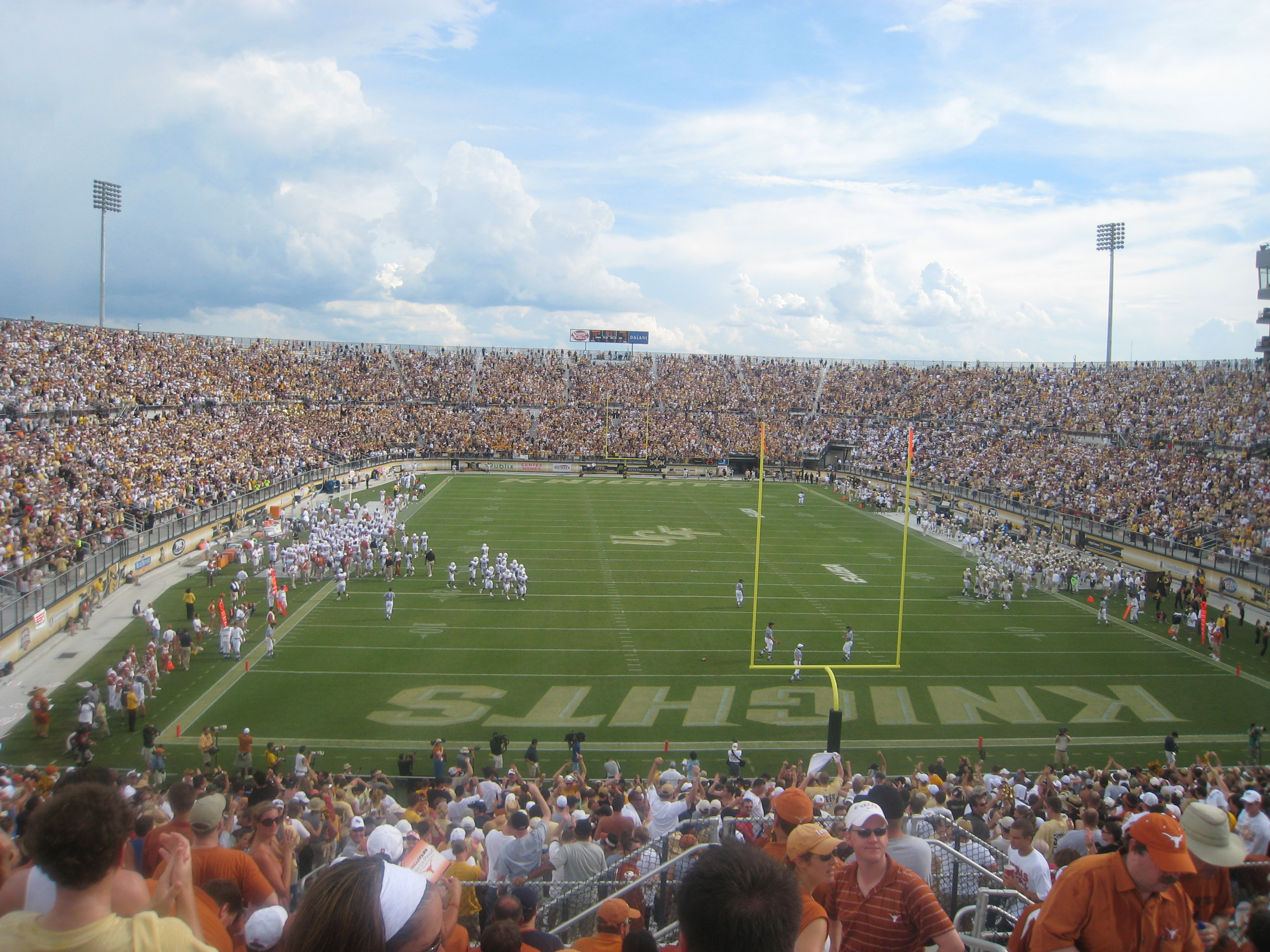
Bright House Networks Stadium, the Knights home field

Date	Time	Opponent	Site	TV	Result	Attendance
August 30	7:00 pm	at Akron*	InfoCision Stadium – Summa Field; Akron, OH	ESPN3	W 56–14	12,616
September 8	12:00 pm	at No. 14 Ohio State*	Ohio Stadium; Columbus, OH	ESPN2	L 16–31	104,745
September 15	4:00 pm	FIU*	Bright House Networks Stadium; Orlando, FL	CSS	W 33–20	40,478
September 29	12:00 pm	Missouri*	Bright House Networks Stadium; Orlando, FL	FSN	L 16–21	35,835
October 4	8:00 pm	East Carolina	Bright House Networks Stadium; Orlando, FL	CBSSN	W 40–20	32,181
October 13	8:00 pm	Southern Miss	Bright House Networks Stadium; Orlando, FL	CBSSN	W 38–31 ^{2OT}	34,514
October 20	8:00 pm	at Memphis	Liberty Bowl Memorial Stadium; Memphis, TN	CSS	W 35–17	22,106
October 27	8:00 pm	at Marshall	Joan C. Edwards Stadium; Huntington, WV	CBSSN	W 54–17	22,563
November 3	7:00 pm	SMU^{†}	Bright House Networks Stadium; Orlando, FL	CBSSN	W 42–17	36,036
November 10	7:00 pm	at UTEP	Sun Bowl Stadium; El Paso, TX	FCS	W 31–24	25,483
November 17	12:00 pm	at Tulsa	Chapman Stadium; Tulsa, OK	FSN	L 21–23	19,725
November 24	12:00 pm	UAB	Bright House Networks Stadium; Orlando, FL	FSN	W 49–24	28,602
December 1	12:00 pm	at Tulsa	Chapman Stadium; Tulsa, OK (C-USA Championship)	ESPN2	L 27–33 ^{OT}	17,635
December 21	7:30 pm	vs. Ball State*	Tropicana Field; St. Petersburg, FL (Beef 'O' Brady's Bowl)	ESPN	W 38–17	21,759
*Non-conference game; ^{†}Homecoming; Rankings from AP Poll released prior to the game; All times are in Eastern time

== Game summaries ==
=== Akron ===
Team	1	2	3	4	Total
• Knights	7	28	14	7	56
Zips	0	0	7	7	14

- Location: Akron, OH
- Game start: 7:00 p.m.
- Elapsed time: 3:05
- Game attendance: 12,616
- Game weather: 83 °F (28 °C), Sunny
- Referee: Steve Barth

=== Ohio State ===
Team	1	2	3	4	Total
Knights	3	7	6	0	16
• Buckeyes	7	10	14	0	31

- Location: Columbus, OH
- Game start: 12:02 p.m.
- Elapsed time: 3:11
- Game attendance: 104,745
- Game weather: 61 °F (16 °C), Cloudy
- Referee: Randy Smith

=== FIU ===
Team	1	2	3	4	Total
Panthers	0	0	14	6	20
• Knights	9	14	7	3	33

- Location: Orlando, FL
- Game start: 4:07 p.m.
- Elapsed time: 3:13
- Game attendance: 40,478
- Game weather: 84 °F (29 °C), Partly Cloudy
- Referee: Wayne Winkler

=== Missouri ===
Team	1	2	3	4	Total
• Tigers	0	7	7	7	21
Knights	3	7	0	6	16

- Location: Orlando, FL
- Game start: 12:05 p.m.
- Elapsed time: 3:26
- Game attendance: 35,835
- Game weather: 86 °F (30 °C), Partly Cloudy
- Referee: David Smith

=== East Carolina ===
Team	1	2	3	4	Total
East Carolina	14	3	3	0	20
• Knights	7	13	10	10	40

- Location: Orlando, FL
- Game start: 8:06 p.m.
- Elapsed time: 3:09
- Game attendance: 32,181
- Game weather: 76 °F (24 °C), Light Rain
- Referee: Randy Smith

=== Southern Miss ===
Team	1	2	3	4	OT	2OT	Total
Golden Eagles	0	7	7	10	7	0	31
• Knights	7	10	0	7	7	7	38

- Location: Orlando, FL
- Game start: 8:06 p.m.
- Elapsed time: 3:49
- Game attendance: 34,514
- Game weather: 75 °F (24 °C), Mostly Clear
- Referee: Ed Ardito

=== Memphis ===
Team	1	2	3	4	Total
• Knights	14	0	7	14	35
Tigers	10	0	0	7	17

- Location: Memphis, TN
- Game start: 7:07 p.m.
- Elapsed time: 3:01
- Game attendance: 22,106
- Game weather: 62 °F (17 °C), Clear
- Referee: Ken Antee

=== Marshall ===
Team	1	2	3	4	Total
• Knights	7	20	20	7	54
Thundering Herd	3	7	0	7	17

- Location: Huntington, WV
- Game start: 8:05 p.m.
- Elapsed time: 3:23
- Game attendance: 22,563
- Game weather: 48 °F (9 °C), Cloudy
- Referee: Brad Rogers

=== SMU ===
Team	1	2	3	4	Total
Mustangs	3	7	0	7	17
• Knights	7	14	14	7	42

- Location: Orlando, FL
- Game start: 7:04 p.m.
- Elapsed time: 3:00
- Game attendance: 36,036
- Game weather: 79 °F (26 °C), Clear
- Referee: Ed Ardito

=== UTEP ===
Team	1	2	3	4	Total
• Knights	7	10	0	14	31
Miners	7	3	0	14	24

- Location: El Paso, TX
- Game start: 7:05 p.m.
- Elapsed time: 3:21
- Game attendance: 25,483
- Game weather: 68 °F (20 °C), Partly Sunny
- Referee: Wayne Winkler

=== Tulsa ===
Team	1	2	3	4	Total
Knights	0	14	0	7	21
• Golden Hurricane	10	0	13	0	23

- Location: Tulsa, OK
- Game start: 12:06 a.m.
- Elapsed time: 3:21
- Game attendance: 19,725
- Game weather: 54 °F (12 °C), Sunny
- Referee: Ken Antee

=== UAB ===
Team	1	2	3	4	Total
Blazers	0	10	7	7	24
• Knights	14	21	7	7	49

- Location: Orlando, FL
- Game start: 12:05 p.m.
- Elapsed time: 3:20
- Game attendance: 28,602
- Game weather: 68 °F (20 °C), Sunny
- Referee: Chris Snead

=== Conference USA Championship Game ===
Team	1	2	3	4	OT	Total
Knights	0	14	13	0	0	27
• Golden Hurricane	7	14	0	6	6	33

- Location: Tulsa, OK
- Game start: 12:01 p.m.
- Elapsed time: 3:39
- Game attendance: 17,635
- Game weather: 73 °F (23 °C), Overcast
- Referee: Ed Ardito
- TV announcers (ESPN2): Dave Pasch (play-by-play), Brian Griese (color)

=== Beef 'O' Brady's Bowl ===
Team	1	2	3	4	Total
• Knights	13	15	7	3	38
Cardinals	0	7	3	7	17

- Location: St. Petersburg, FL
- Game attendance: 21,759
- Game weather: Indoor stadium
- Referee: Tony Backert (Sun Belt)
- TV announcers (ESPN): Dave Neal, Desmond Howard, Andre Ware and Cara Capuano
