= Willie Snead =

American football player (born 1992)

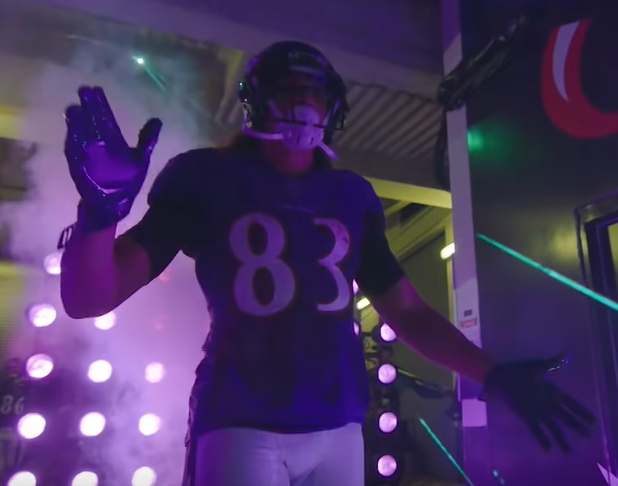
- Snead with the Baltimore Ravens in 2020

Denver Broncos
- Title: Offensive quality control coach

Personal information
- Born: October 17, 1992 (age 34); Winter Park, Florida, U.S.
- Listed height: 5 ft 11 in (1.80 m)
- Listed weight: 195 lb (88 kg)

Career information
- Position: Wide receiver (No. 83, 17)
- High school: Muskegon Heights (MI)
- College: Ball State (2011–2013)
- NFL draft: 2014: undrafted

Career history

Playing
- Cleveland Browns (2014)*; Carolina Panthers (2014)*; New Orleans Saints (2014–2017); Baltimore Ravens (2018–2020); Las Vegas Raiders (2021); Carolina Panthers (2021); San Francisco 49ers (2022–2023); Miami Dolphins (2024)*
- * Offseason or practice squad member only

Coaching
- Denver Broncos (2026–present) Offensive quality control coach

Awards and highlights
- 2× First-team All-MAC (2012, 2013)

Career NFL statistics
- Receptions: 281
- Receiving yards: 3,445
- Receiving touchdowns: 16
- Stats at Pro Football Reference

Willie Lee Snead IV (born October 17, 1992) is an American professional football coach and former wide receiver who is an offensive quality control coach for the Denver Broncos of the National Football League (NFL). He played college football at Ball State and was signed by the Cleveland Browns as an undrafted free agent in 2014. He was also a member of the Carolina Panthers, New Orleans Saints, Baltimore Ravens, Las Vegas Raiders, and San Francisco 49ers.

== Early life ==
Snead played his freshman year at Glade Central High School in Belle Glade, Florida. The Snead family then moved to Michigan where his father, Willie Snead III, had taken the head coaching job at Holland Christian High School in Holland, Michigan. Holland Christian went 14–0 in 2008 winning the state championship. Snead, as a sophomore, was one of the top receivers on the team with 35 receptions, 543 receiving yards, and 5 touchdowns.

Another move to Muskegon took Snead to Muskegon Heights High School where he would play his final two years of high school football. His senior year, Snead was named Michigan Division 5–6 Player of the Year by the Associated Press. At Muskegon Heights, Snead played quarterback and in his senior year he threw for 2,200 passing yards with 13 touchdowns and one interception. He rushed for an additional 1,083 yards and nine touchdowns. Snead also played defense as a linebacker and safety with one interception and 76 tackles.

== College career ==
Snead played in eleven games for the Ball State Cardinals in 2011. In his first start, Snead recorded 180 receiving yards, which is the 11th-best for a single game in Ball State history, and a touchdown against Army. His first career reception came at South Florida and his first career touchdown catch came against Buffalo. Ball State finished the season 6–6 with another win over Army 48–21 and notable losses to #22 South Florida and #2 Oklahoma. Snead finished his freshman season with 327 receiving yards and two receiving touchdowns.

In the 2012 season, Snead started in 12 games and played in all 13 games. At the end of the 2012 season, Snead was tied for third on Ball State's single season receptions and third for single season receiving yards. In his sophomore season, Snead ended the year 25th in the nation on receiving yards per game averaging 88 yards per game. He finished the season with 89 receptions, 1,148 receiving yards, and nine receiving touchdowns. The nine receiving touchdowns ranked sixth in a single season in school history. The Cardinals finished the 2012 season 9–3 with important wins over #25 Toledo 34–27, the then Big East’s South Florida 31–27 and, for a second year in a row, the Big Ten’s Indiana Hoosiers 41–39. The three regular season losses came to the #12 Clemson Tigers, Kent State, and Northern Illinois. Both Kent State and Northern Illinois went on to be ranked in the Top 25. Snead started for Ball State in the 2012 Beef 'O' Brady's Bowl game in St. Petersburg, Florida where they were defeated by the Central Florida Knights 38–17.

In 2013, Snead helped quarterback Keith Wenning and head coach Pete Lembo lead the Cardinals to another successful season, finishing bowl eligible for the third consecutive year with a 10–3 record. Snead had 100+ receiving yards in nine games, a school record, and tied with Vanderbilt's Jordan Matthews for the most such games that year. He finished the season with 106 receptions for 1,516 yards and 15 touchdowns, setting the Ball State single-season receiving record in all three categories. Those totals also ranked him tied for seventh, third, and tied for third respectively among all college football players that season.

Snead bypassed his senior season to enter the 2014 NFL draft.

=== College statistics ===
Snead ranks second in Ball State history with 2,991 receiving yards (to Dante Ridgeway's 3,030) and 26 receiving touchdowns (to Darius Hill's 31), and third in receptions with 223. He and Ridgeway are the only two players in Ball State history to have two 1,000 yard receiving seasons, and his 13 games with 100+ yards receiving is a school record.

=== Awards ===
- Selected as a Biletnikoff Award Semifinalist in 2013
- 2012 All-MAC First Team Offense
- 2013 All-MAC First Team Offense
- 2013 Honorable Mention WR All-American by Sports Illustrated

== Professional career ==
Pre-draft measurables
Height	Weight	Arm length	Hand span	Wingspan	40-yard dash	10-yard split	20-yard split	20-yard shuttle	Three-cone drill	Vertical jump	Broad jump	Bench press
5 ft 11 in (1.80 m)	195 lb (88 kg)	33 in (0.84 m)	10 1/4 in (0.26 m)	6 ft 6 7/8 in (2.00 m)	4.56 s	1.49 s	2.57 s	4.38 s	7.18 s	36.0 in (0.91 m)	9 ft 11 in (3.02 m)	11 reps
All values from NFL Combine/Pro Day

=== Cleveland Browns ===
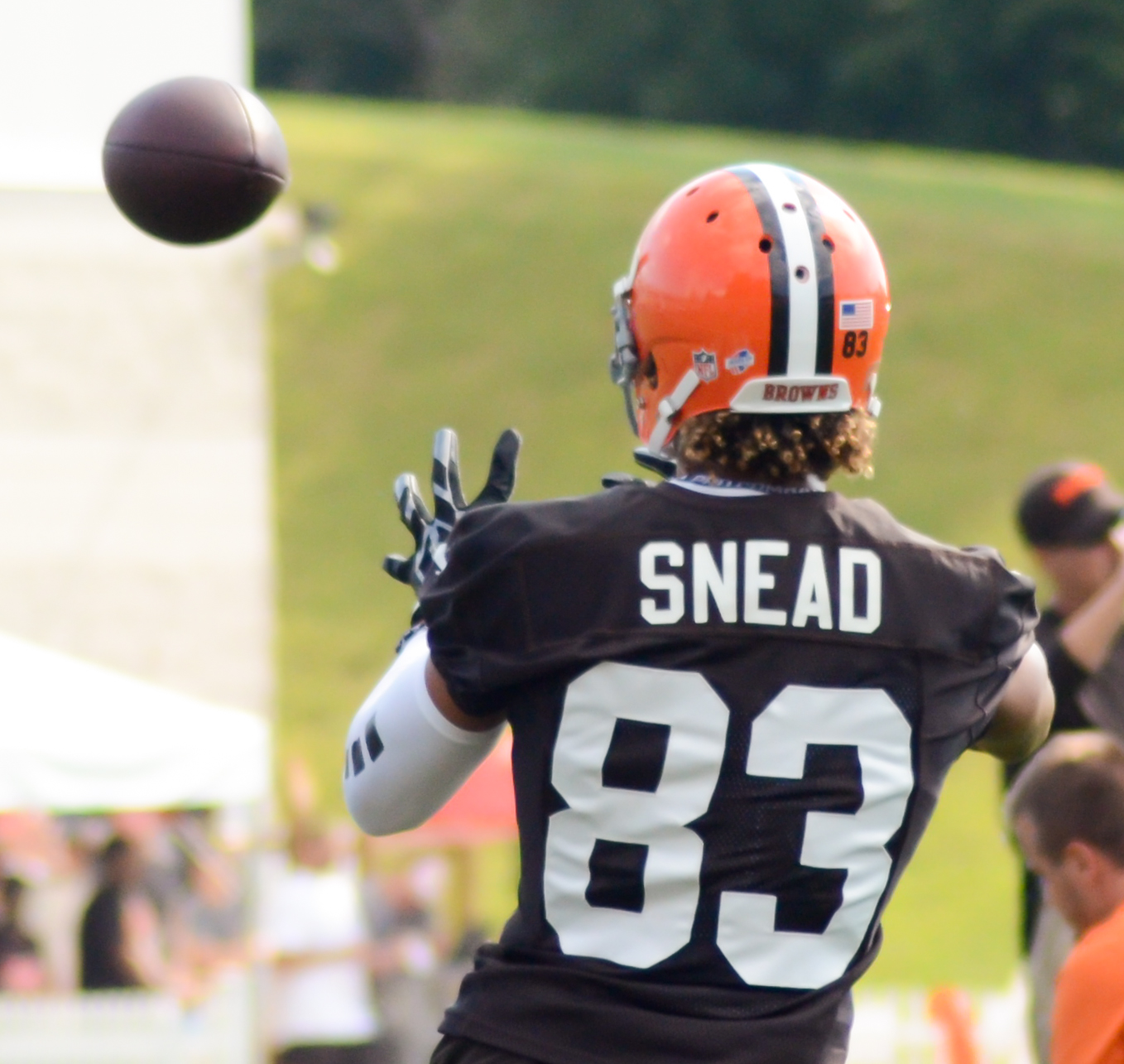
Snead with the Cleveland Browns in 2014

Snead went undrafted during the 2014 NFL draft. On May 10, 2014, the Cleveland Browns signed Snead to a three-year, $1.54 million contract that includes a signing bonus of $5,000. Throughout training camp, Snead competed for a roster spot against Andrew Hawkins, Anthony Armstrong, Conner Vernon, Charles Johnson, and Taylor Gabriel. Snead performed well throughout training camp and finished the preseason with eight receptions for 124 receiving yards. On August 30, the Browns waived Snead as part of their final roster cuts.

=== Carolina Panthers (first stint) ===
Snead signed with the practice squad of the Carolina Panthers on September 23, 2014. On November 6, the Panthers released Snead from their practice squad.

=== New Orleans Saints ===
==== 2014 ====
On December 11, 2014, the New Orleans Saints signed Snead to their practice squad. Snead spent the remainder of the 2014 NFL season on the Saints’ practice squad and did not appear in any regular season games during the season. On December 29, the New Orleans Saints signed Snead to a reserve/futures contract.

==== 2015 ====
During training camp in 2015, Snead competed for a roster spot against Joe Morgan, Nick Toon, Seantavius Jones, Lance Lewis, Jalen Saunders, R.J. Harris, and Kyle Prater. Head coach Sean Payton named Snead the fourth wide receiver on the depth chart to begin the regular season, behind Marques Colston, Brandin Cooks, and Brandon Coleman.

He made his professional regular season debut in the Saints season-opener at the Arizona Cardinals and caught one pass for a 63-yard gain during their 31–19 loss. On September 20, 2015, Snead made four receptions for 44-yards and scored his first career touchdown as the Saints lost 26–19 against the Tampa Bay Buccaneers in Week 2. Snead scored his first career touchdown on a 16-yard pass by Saints’ quarterback Drew Brees during the fourth quarter. In Week 5, he earned his first career start and made six receptions for a season-high 141 receiving yards during a 39–17 loss at the Philadelphia Eagles. On November 1, 2015, Snead had six receptions for 70-yards and two touchdowns in the Saints’ 52–49 victory against the New York Giants in Week 8. Snead was inactive for the Saints’ Week 13 loss against the Panthers due to a calf injury. In Week 14, he collected seven receptions for 122 receiving yards during a 24–17 win at the Buccaneers. The following week, Snead made a season-high ten catches for 76 receiving yards as the Saints lost 35–27 to the Detroit Lions in Week 15. He finished the 2015 season with 69 receptions for a career-high 984 receiving yards and three touchdowns in 15 games and eight starts. He finished second on the team in receiving yards, behind Brandin Cooks (1,138 yds), and ranked 28th among all players in the league.

==== 2016 ====
Throughout training camp, Snead competed against rookie second-round pick Michael Thomas for a job as a starting wide receiver after the Saints released Marques Colston. Head coach Sean Payton named Snead the third wide receiver to start the regular season, behind Brandin Cooks and Michael Thomas.

He appeared in the Saints season-opener against the Oakland Raiders and caught nine passes for a career-high 172 yards and a touchdown during their 35–34 loss. Snead, Cooks, and Michael Thomas combined for a total of 373 receiving yards against the Raiders, which became the most by a New Orleans trio in a loss. Snead was inactive for a Week 3 loss against the Atlanta Falcons after injuring his toe. On November 13, 2016, Snead caught five passes for 47 yards and had a season-high two touchdown receptions during the Saints’ 25–23 loss against the Denver Broncos in Week 10. In Week 12, Snead completed a 50-yard touchdown pass to running back Tim Hightower off a lateral during the fourth quarter of a 49–21 victory against the Los Angeles Rams. It marked his first career touchdown pass. Snead finished the 2016 NFL season with 72 receptions for 895 receiving yards and four touchdowns in 15 games and four starts.

==== 2017 ====
Snead entered training camp slated as the No. 2 wide receiver, but received competition for the role from Ted Ginn Jr. On September 1, 2017, Snead received a three-game suspension stemming from an incident where he was arrested for driving while intoxicated and failing to maintain proper control of his vehicle after crashing into a parked car and failing a breathalyzer test. He was originally suspended for four games, but was reduced to three after an appeal. Upon returning from suspension, Snead was named the fourth wide receiver in the depth chart behind Michael Thomas, Ted Ginn Jr., and Brandon Coleman. He also lost his position as the primary slot receiver to Brandon Coleman. Snead finished the 2017 NFL season with only eight receptions for 92 receiving yards and was held without a touchdown reception in 11 games and seven starts.

On March 13, 2018, the New Orleans Saints applied a level three tender to Snead as a restricted free agent. The tender allowed the Saints to match any contract offer given to Snead.

=== Baltimore Ravens ===
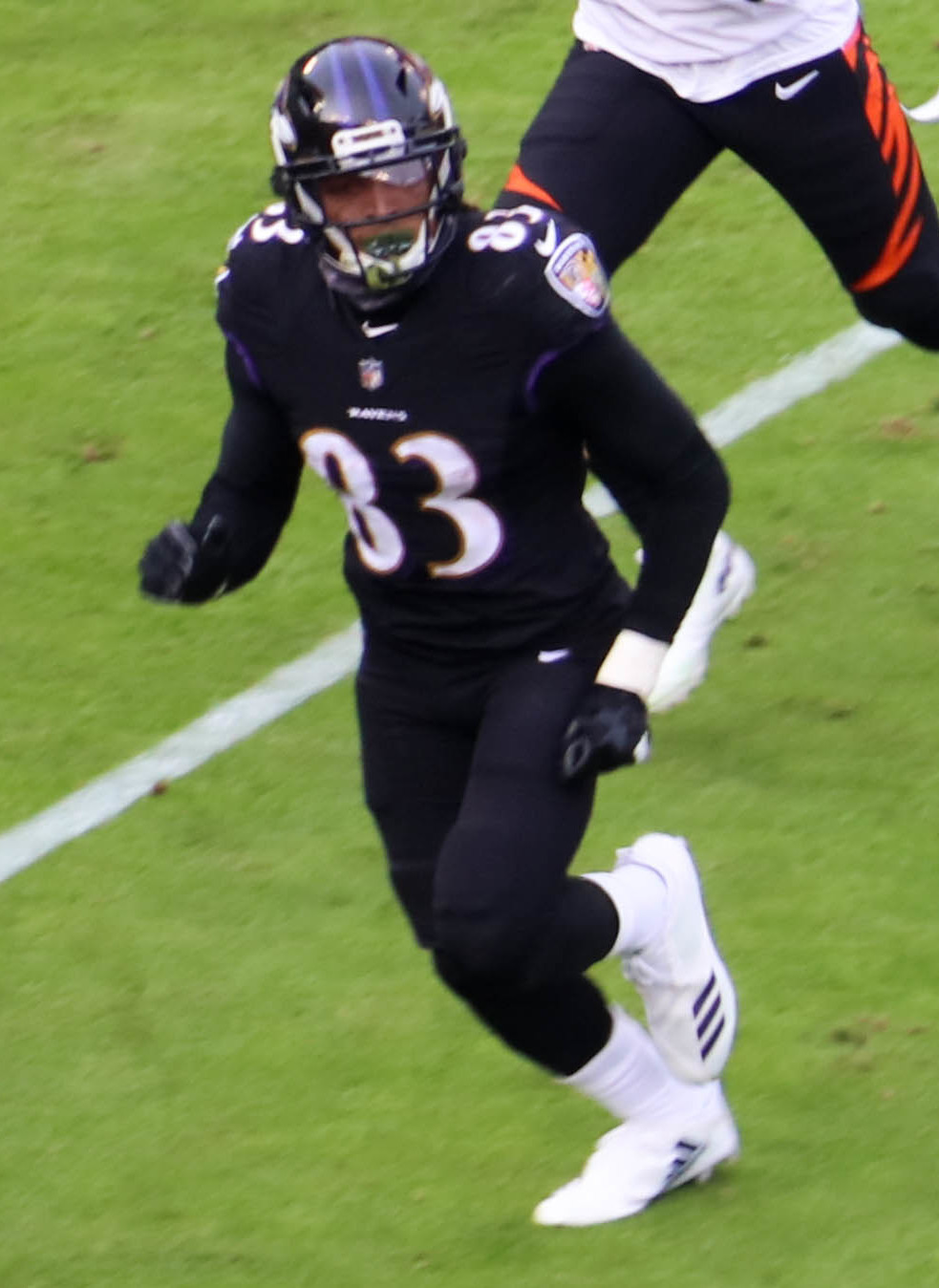
Snead with the Baltimore Ravens in 2018

==== 2018 ====
On April 20, 2018, the Baltimore Ravens signed Snead to a two-year offer sheet worth up to $10.4 million, giving the Saints five days to match or let him sign with Baltimore. On April 23, 2018, the Saints officially declined to match the Ravens' contract offer. As a result, Snead became a member of the Ravens and received a two-year, $7 million contract that includes $3 million guaranteed and a signing bonus of $2 million.

Snead joined a revamped wide receivers core that included free agent acquisitions Michael Crabtree and John Brown. Head coach John Harbaugh named Snead the No. 3 starting wide receiver on the depth chart, behind Crabtree and Brown. He was also named the primary slot receiver.

He made his Ravens regular season debut in their season-opener against the Buffalo Bills and made four receptions for 49 yards and caught a 13-yard touchdown pass from Joe Flacco during the third quarter of their 47–3 victory. In Week 6, Snead caught a season-high six passes for 60 receiving yards as the Ravens defeated the Tennessee Titans 21–0. He finished the season with 62 receptions for 651 yards and one touchdown. He led the team in receptions and finished second in receiving yards behind John Brown.

==== 2019 ====
On October 28, 2019, Snead signed a one-year, $6 million contract extension with the Ravens through the 2020 season. In Week 12 against the Rams, Snead caught two passes for 14 yards and two touchdowns in the 45–6 win. Overall, Snead finished the 2019 season with 31 receptions for 339 receiving yards and five receiving touchdowns.

==== 2020 ====
In Week 1 against the Browns, Snead caught four passes for 64 yards and his first receiving touchdown of the season during the 38–6 win. In Week 8, against the Pittsburgh Steelers, he had five receptions for 106 yards in the 24–28 loss for his first 100-yard receiving game since the 2016 season. In Week 10, against the New England Patriots, he had five receptions for 64 yards and two touchdowns in the 17–23 loss. Snead was placed on the reserve/COVID-19 list by the team on November 30, 2020, and activated on December 10. He finished the 2020 season with 33 receptions for 432 receiving yards and three receiving touchdowns.

=== Las Vegas Raiders ===
On March 26, 2021, Snead signed a one-year, $1.1 million contract with the Las Vegas Raiders. On October 26, 2021, he was released by the Raiders.

=== Carolina Panthers (second stint) ===
On October 27, 2021, Snead signed with the Panthers’ practice squad. He played in nine games in the 2021 season. His contract expired when the team's season ended on January 9, 2022.

=== San Francisco 49ers ===
On August 6, 2022, Snead signed with the San Francisco 49ers. He was released on August 30, 2022, and signed to the practice squad the next day. He was released off the practice squad on September 7, 2022. He was re-signed to the practice squad on September 14, 2022. Snead was promoted to active roster on October 3, 2022. He was released one day later on October 4, 2022, and re-signed to the practice squad. He signed back to the active roster on October 29. He was released again two days later. He was signed back to the practice squad the next day.

On May 1, 2023, Snead re-signed with the 49ers. He was released on August 29, 2023, and re-signed to the practice squad. He was signed to the active roster on December 25, but waived the next day and re-signed to the practice squad. His contract expired when the team's season ended on February 11, 2024.

=== Miami Dolphins ===
On July 31, 2024, Snead signed with the Miami Dolphins. He was placed on injured reserve on August 19, and released a few days later.

== NFL career statistics ==
Year	Team	Games		Receiving					Rushing					Fumbles	
Year	Team	GP	GS	Rec	Yds	Avg	Lng	TD	Att	Yds	Avg	Lng	TD	Fum	Lost
2015	NO	15	8	69	984	14.3	63	3	0	0	0.0	0	0	2	1
2016	NO	15	4	72	895	12.4	49	4	0	0	0.0	0	0	2	0
2017	NO	11	7	8	92	11.5	26	0	0	0	0.0	0	0	1	1
2018	BAL	16	10	62	651	10.5	28	1	1	13	13.0	13	0	0	0
2019	BAL	16	11	31	339	10.9	50T	5	2	2	1.0	2	0	0	0
2020	BAL	13	8	33	432	13.1	34	3	0	0	0.0	0	0	1	0
2021	LV	5	0	3	33	11.0	15	0	0	0	0.0	0	0	0	0
Total		91	48	278	3,425	12.3	63	16	3	15	5.0	13	0	6	2

== Coaching career ==
On March 12, 2026, it was announced that Snead was hired to be an offensive quality control coach for the Denver Broncos.

== Personal life ==
His father, Willie Snead III, played wide receiver at Virginia and Florida and was drafted by the New York Jets in the 12th round of the 1989 NFL draft with the 321st overall pick.
