= 2012 Conference USA football season =

- League: NCAA Division I Football Bowl Subdivision
- Sport: Football
- Duration: August 30, 2012 through December 31, 2012
- Teams: 12
- TV partner(s): Fox Sports, CBS Sports Network, ESPN, CSS, CST

2013 NFL Draft
- Top draft pick: CB D. J. Hayden, Houston
- Picked by: Oakland Raiders, 12th overall

Regular Season
- Season MVP: QB Rakeem Cato, Marshall
- East champions: UCF & East Carolina (co-champions)
- West champions: Tulsa

Championship Game
- Champions: Tulsa
- Runners-up: UCF
- Finals MVP: RB Trey Watts, Tulsa

Football seasons
- 2011 2013

2012 Conference USA football standings
	Conf.			Overall
Team	W		L	W		L
East Division
UCF xy	7	–	1	10	–	4
East Carolina x	7	–	1	8	–	5
Marshall	4	–	4	5	–	7
Memphis	4	–	4	4	–	8
UAB	2	–	6	3	–	9
Southern Miss	0	–	8	0	–	12
West Division
Tulsa xy$	7	–	1	11	–	3
SMU	5	–	3	7	–	6
Rice	4	–	4	7	–	6
Houston	4	–	4	5	–	7
UTEP	2	–	6	3	–	9
Tulane	2	–	6	2	–	10
Championship: Tulsa 33, UCF 27
$ – Conference champion; x – Division champion/co-champions; y – Championship game participant; Rankings from AP Poll

The 2012 Conference USA football season was an NCAA football season that was from August 2012 through January 2013. Conference USA consists of 12 football members separated into 2 divisions: East Carolina, Marshall, Memphis, Southern Miss, UAB, UCF make up the eastern division, while Houston, Rice, SMU, Tulane, Tulsa, and UTEP comprise the western division.

The 2012 football season marked the 18th season of the conference's existence and 17th of football competition; although C-USA was established in 1995, it did not begin football competition until 1996. In addition, the season was the last to feature participation from Houston, Memphis, SMU and UCF, as the four schools intend left the conference for the American Athletic Conference on July 1, 2013.

UCF was initially under a postseason ban for this season due to recruiting violations; that ban was later moved to the 2013 season before being dropped entirely.

== Regular season ==
Index to colors and formatting
Conference USA member won
Conference USA member lost
Conference USA teams in **bold**

=== Week One ===
Date	Time	Visiting team	Home team	Site	TV	Result	Attendance	Ref.
August 30	6:30 pm	UCLA	**Rice**	Rice Stadium • Houston, TX	CBSSN	**L** UCLA 49-24	23,105	
August 30	7:00 pm	**UCF**	Akron	InfoCision Stadium – Summa Field • Akron, OH	ESPN3	**W** UCF 56-14	12,616	
September 1	11:00 am	**UAB**	Troy	Legion Field • Birmingham, AL	FCS	**L** Troy 39-29	28,612	
September 1	12:00 pm	Appalachian State	**East Carolina**	Dowdy–Ficklen Stadium • Greenville, NC	FSN	**W** ECU 35-13	49,203	
September 1	12:00 pm	**Marshall**	No. 11 West Virginia	Mountaineer Field • Morgantown, WV	FX	**L** WV 69-34	59,120	
September 1	2:30 pm	**Southern Miss**	No. 16 Nebraska	Memorial Stadium • Lincoln, Nebraska	ABC	**L** UN 49-20	85,425	
September 1	2:30 pm	**Tulsa**	Iowa State	Jack Trice Stadium • Ames, IA	FSN	**L** ISU 38-23	54,931	
September 1	6:00 pm	Tennessee–Martin	**Memphis**	Liberty Bowl Memorial Stadium • Memphis, TN		**L** UTM 20-17	39,076	
September 1	7:00 pm	Texas State	**Houston**	Robertson Stadium • Houston, TX	CSS	**L** TSU 30-13	32,207	
September 1	7:00 pm	Rutgers	**Tulane**	Mercedes-Benz Superdome • New Orleans, LA	CBSSN	**L** RU 24-12	26,059	
September 1	8:30 pm	No. 4 Oklahoma	**UTEP**	Sun Bowl Stadium • El Paso, TX	FSN	**L** OU 24-7	40,137	
September 2	5:30 pm	**SMU**	Baylor	Floyd Casey Stadium • Waco, TX	FSN	**L** UB 59-24	43,514	
^{#}Rankings from AP Poll released prior to game.

=== Week Two ===
Date	Time	Visiting team	Home team	Site	TV	Result	Attendance	Ref.
September 8	12:21 pm	Louisiana Tech	**Houston**	Robertson Stadium • Houston, TX	CBSSN	**L** LT 56-49	29,142	
September 8	7:00 pm	**East Carolina**	South Carolina	Williams–Brice Stadium • Columbia, SC	SECN	**L** SCAR 48-10	77,006	
September 8	7:00 pm	**Marshall**	Western Carolina	Joan C. Edwards Stadium • Huntington, WV	FCS	**W** MU 52-24	25,317	
^{#}Rankings from AP Poll released prior to game.

=== Week Three ===
Date	Time	Visiting team	Home team	Site	TV	Result	Attendance	Ref.
September 15	3:30 pm	**East Carolina**	**Southern Miss**	M. M. Roberts Stadium • Hattiesburg, MS	CBSSN	ECU 24-14	34,140	
September 15	3:30 pm	**Houston**	UCLA	Rose Bowl • Pasadena, CA	Pac-12 Network	**L** UCLA 6-37	53,723	
September 15	6:30 pm	Ohio	**Marshall**	Joan C. Edwards Stadium • Huntington, WV		**L** Ohio 27-24	33,436	
^{#}Rankings from AP Poll released prior to game.

=== Week Four ===
Date	Time	Visiting team	Home team	Site	TV	Result	Attendance	Ref.
September 22	3:30 pm	**East Carolina**	North Carolina	Kenan Memorial Stadium • Chapel Hill, NC	ESPNU	**L** NC 27-6	59,500	
September 22	3:30 pm	**Marshall**	**Rice**	Rice Stadium • Houston, TX]	CSS	MU 54-21	14,204	
^{#}Rankings from AP Poll released prior to game.

=== Week Five ===
Date	Time	Visiting team	Home team	Site	TV	Result	Attendance	Ref.
September 29	3:15 pm	**Marshall**	Purdue	Ross–Ade Stadium • West Lafayette, LA	BTN	**L** PU 51-41	45,481	
September 29	7:00 pm	**UTEP**	**East Carolina**	Dowdy–Ficklen Stadium • Greenville, NC	WITN	ECU 28-18	47,817	
September 29	7:00 pm	**Houston**	**Rice**	Reliant Stadium • Houston, TX (rivalry)	FSN	UH 35-14	32,718	
^{#}Rankings from AP Poll released prior to game.

=== Week Six ===
Date	Time	Visiting team	Home team	Site	TV	Result	Attendance	Ref.
October 4	8:00 pm	**East Carolina**	**UCF**	Bright House Networks Stadium • Orlando, FL	CBSSN	UCF 40-20	32,181	
October 6	3:30 pm	**Tulsa**	**Marshall**	Joan C. Edwards Stadium • Huntington, WV	CBSSN	TU 45-38	27,189	
October 6	6:00 pm	**North Texas**	**Houston**	Robertson Stadium • Houston, TX	FSN	UH 44-21	25,476	
^{#}Rankings from AP Poll released prior to game.

=== Week Seven ===
Date	Time	Visiting team	Home team	Site	TV	Result	Attendance	Ref.
October 13	11:00 a.m.	**UAB**	**Houston**	Robertson Stadium • Houston, TX	CSNH	UH 39-17	25,242	
October 13	4:30 pm	**Memphis**	**East Carolina**	Dowdy–Ficklen Stadium • Greenville, NC	WITN	ECU 41-7	45,137	
^{#}Rankings from AP Poll released prior to game.

=== Week Eight ===
Date	Time	Visiting team	Home team	Site	TV	Result	Attendance	Ref.
October 18	7:00 pm	**Houston**	**SMU**	Gerald J. Ford Stadium • University Park, TX (rivalry)	FSN	SMU 72-42	16,459	
October 20	7:00 pm	**East Carolina**	**UAB**	Legion Field • Birmingham, AL	FCS	ECU 42-35	12,403	
October 20	7:00 pm	**Marshall**	**Southern Miss**	M. M. Roberts Stadium • Hattiesburg, MS	CBSSN	MU 59-24	24,093	
^{#}Rankings from AP Poll released prior to game.

=== Week Nine ===
Date	Time	Visiting team	Home team	Site	TV	Result	Attendance	Ref.
October 27	11:00 a.m.	**UTEP**	**Houston**	Robertson Stadium • Houston, TX	CSS/CSNH	UH 45-35	27,433	
October 27	3:30 pm	**Navy**	**East Carolina**	Dowdy–Ficklen Stadium • Greenville, NC	FSN	Navy 56-28	48,327	
October 27	3:30 pm	**UCF**	**Marshall**	Joan C. Edwards Stadium • Huntington, WV	CBSSN	UCF 54-17	22,563	
^{#}Rankings from AP Poll released prior to game.

=== Week Ten ===
Date	Time	Visiting team	Home team	Site	TV	Result	Attendance	Ref.
November 3	12:00 pm	**Houston**	**East Carolina**	Dowdy–Ficklen Stadium • Greenville, NC	FSN	ECU 48-28	45,455	
November 3	2:00 pm	**Memphis**	**Marshall**	Joan C. Edwards Stadium • Huntington, WV		MU 38-28	22,041	
^{#}Rankings from AP Poll released prior to game.

=== Week Eleven ===
Date	Time	Visiting team	Home team	Site	TV	Result	Attendance	Ref.
November 10	4:00 pm	**Tulsa**	**Houston**	Robertson Stadium • Houston, TX	CBSSN	UT 41-7	25,827	
November 10	4:30	**Marshall**	**UAB**	Legion Field] • Birmingham, AL	CSS/CSNH	UAB 38-31	11,981	
^{#}Rankings from AP Poll released prior to game.

=== Week Twelve ===
Date	Time	Visiting team	Home team	Site	TV	Result	Attendance	Ref.
November 17	3:30 pm	**East Carolina**	**Tulane**	Mercedes-Benz Superdome • New Orleans, LA	WITN	ECU 28-23	14,041	
November 17	11:00 pm	**Houston**	**Mashall**	Joan C. Edwards Stadium • Huntington, WV	CSS/CSNH	MU 44-41	18,831	
^{#}Rankings from AP Poll released prior to game.

=== Week Thirteen ===
Date	Time	Visiting team	Home team	Site	TV	Result	Attendance	Ref.
November 23	2:00 pm	**Marshall**	**East Carolina**	Dowdy–Ficklen Stadium • Greenville, NC	CBSSN	ECU 65-59	46,317	
November 24	2:30 pm	**Tulane**	**Houston**	Robertson Stadium • Houston, TX	FSN	UH 40-17	-	
^{#}Rankings from AP Poll released prior to game.

== Players of the week ==
Week	Offensive		Defensive		Special teams	
Week	Player	Team	Player	Team	Player	Team
1 – Sep. 3	Nathan Jeffery, RB	UTEP	Jeremy Grove, LB	East Carolina	Cameron Nwosu, LB	Rice
2 – Sep. 10	David Piland, QB	Houston	Kenneth Acker, DB	SMU	Chris Boswell, K	Rice
3 – Sep. 17	Nick Lamaison, QB	UTEP	Montese Overton, LB	East Carolina	Trent Tignor, P	East Carolina
4 – Sep. 24	Taylor McHargue, QB	Rice	Dexter McCoil, DB	Tulsa	Tyler Williams, P	Marshall
5 – Oct. 1	Tommy Shuler, WR	Marshall	Chip Thompson, S	East Carolina	Autrey Golden, KR	UTEP
6 – Oct. 8	Charles Sims, RB	Houston	Randall Joyner, LB	SMU	Quincy McDuffie, KR	UCF
7 – Oct. 15	Shane Carden, QB	East Carolina	DeAundre Brown, LB	Tulsa	Matt Hogan, K	Houston
8 – Oct. 22	Latavius Murray, RB	UCF	A. J. Bouye, DB	UCF	Kevin Pope, LB,	SMU
9 – Oct. 29	Ryan Griffin, QB	Tulane	D. J. Hayden, DB	Houston	Quincy McDuffie, KR	UCF
10 – Nov. 5	Shane Carden, QB Rakeem Cato, QB	East Carolina Marshall	Troy Davis, LB	UCF	Cairo Santos, K	Tulane
11 – Nov. 12	Darrin Reaves, RB	UAB	Cory Dorris, DE	Tulsa	Jackie Williams, PR	UAB
12 – Nov. 19	Keyarris Garrett, WR	Tulsa	DeAundre Brown, LB	Tulsa	Chris Boswell, K	Rice

== Rankings ==
Legend
	Improvement in ranking
	Drop in ranking
	Not ranked previous week
RV	Received votes but were not ranked in Top 25 of poll

Ranking Movement
		Pre	Wk 1	Wk 2	Wk 3	Wk 4	Wk 5	Wk 6	Wk 7	Wk 8	Wk 9	Wk 10	Wk 11	Wk 12	Wk 13	Wk 14	Final
East Carolina Pirates	AP																
East Carolina Pirates	C																
East Carolina Pirates	HAR	Not released															
East Carolina Pirates	BCS	Not released															
Houston Cougars	AP	RV															
Houston Cougars	C	RV															
Houston Cougars	HAR	Not released															
Houston Cougars	BCS	Not released															
Marshall Thundering Herd	AP																
Marshall Thundering Herd	C																
Marshall Thundering Herd	HAR	Not released															
Marshall Thundering Herd	BCS	Not released															
Memphis Tigers	AP																
Memphis Tigers	C																
Memphis Tigers	HAR	Not released															
Memphis Tigers	BCS	Not released															
Rice Owls	AP																
Rice Owls	C																
Rice Owls	HAR	Not released															
Rice Owls	BCS	Not released															
Southern Miss Golden Eagles	AP																
Southern Miss Golden Eagles	C	RV															
Southern Miss Golden Eagles	HAR	Not released															
Southern Miss Golden Eagles	BCS	Not released															
SMU Mustangs	AP																
SMU Mustangs	C																
SMU Mustangs	HAR	Not released															
SMU Mustangs	BCS	Not released															
Tulane Green Wave	AP																
Tulane Green Wave	C																
Tulane Green Wave	HAR	Not released															
Tulane Green Wave	BCS	Not released															
Tulsa Golden Hurricane	AP									RV							
Tulsa Golden Hurricane	C									RV							
Tulsa Golden Hurricane	HAR	Not released															
Tulsa Golden Hurricane	BCS	Not released															
UAB Blazers	AP																
UAB Blazers	C																
UAB Blazers	HAR	Not released															
UAB Blazers	BCS	Not released															
UCF Knights	AP	RV	RV									RV	RV				
UCF Knights	C	RV	RV									RV	RV				
UCF Knights	HAR	Not released										RV					
UCF Knights	BCS	Not released															
UTEP Miners	AP																
UTEP Miners	C																
UTEP Miners	HAR	Not released															
UTEP Miners	BCS	Not released															

== Records against other conferences ==
Conference	Wins	Losses
ACC	0	2
Big 12	1	5
Big East	0	2
Big Ten	0	5
Independents	0	1
MAC	1	1
Mountain West	1	1
Pac-12	0	2
SEC	0	7
Sun Belt	2	6
WAC	2	3
All FCS	5	1
Overall	12	36

== Bowl games ==
(C-USA teams in bold)

Bowl Game	Date	Stadium	City	Television	Time (EST)	Away team	Home team	Score	Attendance	Payout (US$)
St. Petersburg Bowl	December 21, 2012	Tropicana Field	St. Petersburg, FL	ESPN	7:30 p.m.	Ball State	**UCF**	**W** 17–38		
New Orleans Bowl	December 22, 2012	Mercedes-Benz Superdome	New Orleans, LA	ESPN	12:00 p.m.	**East Carolina**	Louisiana–Lafayette	**L** 34–43		
Hawai'i Bowl	December 24, 2012	Aloha Stadium	Honolulu, HI	ESPN	8:00 p.m.	**SMU**	Fresno State	**W** 43–10		
Armed Forces Bowl	December 29, 2012	Amon G. Carter Stadium	Fort Worth, TX	ESPN	11:45 a.m.	**Rice**	Air Force	**W** 33–14		
Liberty Bowl	December 31, 2012	Liberty Bowl	Memphis, TN	ESPN	3:30 p.m.	Iowa State	**Tulsa**	**W** 17–31		

== Attendance ==
Team	Stadium	Capacity	Gm 1	Gm 2	Gm 3	Gm 4	Gm 5	Gm 6	Gm 7	Total	Average	% of Capacity
East Carolina	Dowdy–Ficklen Stadium	50,000	49,023	47,817	45,137	48,327	45,455	46,317		282,076	47,013	94.03%
Houston	Robertson Stadium	32,000	32,207	29,142	25,476	25,242	27,433	25,827	25,402	190,729	27,247	85.1%
Marshall	Joan C. Edwards Stadium	38,016	25,317	33,436	27,189	22,563	22,041	18,831		149,377	24,896	65.5%
Memphis	Liberty Bowl Memorial Stadium	61,000	39,076	27,112	17,831	22,106	18,796	21,305		146,226	24,371	39.9%
Rice	Rice Stadium	47,000	23,105	14,204	28,677	14,927	20,710			101,623	20,325	43.2%
Southern Miss	M. M. Roberts Stadium	36,000	34,140	23,492	25,337	24,093	22,874	23,757		153,693	25,987	71.2%
SMU	Gerald J. Ford Stadium	32,000	20,122	32,016	28,436	16,459	20,330	16,343	15,336	149,042	21,292	66.5%
Tulane	Mercedes-Benz Superdome	76,468	26,059	28,913	18,063	12,531	15,467	11,519	14,041	126,593	18,085	23.7%
Tulsa	H. A. Chapman Stadium	30,000	17,880	19,139	24,236	18,961	22,567	19,725		122,508	20,418	68.1%
UAB	Legion Field	71,594	28,612	13,196	16,212	12,403	11,981	9,219		91,623	15,271	21.3%
UCF	Bright House Networks Stadium	45,323	40,478	35,835	32,181	34,514	36,036	28,602		207,646	34,608	76.4%
UTEP	Sun Bowl Stadium	51,500	40,137	32,933	34,073	23,234	25,483	20,384		176,244	29,374	57.04%

== Bowl eligibility ==
=== Bowl eligible (5) ===
- **Tulsa** (9–3) became bowl eligible on October 11 after defeating UTEP.
- **UCF** (9–3) became bowl eligible on October 27 after defeating Marshall.
- **East Carolina** (8–4) became bowl eligible on November 3 after defeating Houston.
- **SMU** (6–6) became bowl eligible on November 24 after defeating Tulsa.
- **Rice** (6–6) became bowl eligible on November 24 after defeating UTEP.

=== Bowl ineligible (7) ===
- **Southern Miss** (0–12) lost the ability to become bowl eligible on October 20 after losing to Marshall.
- **Memphis** (4–8) lost the ability to become bowl eligible on October 27 after losing to SMU.
- **UAB** (3–9) lost the ability to become bowl eligible on October 27 after losing to Tulane.
- **UTEP** (3–9) lost the ability to become bowl eligible on October 27 after losing to Houston.
- **Tulane** (2–10) lost the ability to become bowl eligible on November 3 after losing to Rice.
- **Houston** (5–7) lost the ability to become bowl eligible on November 17 after losing to Marshall.
- **Marshall** (5–7) lost the ability to become bowl eligible on November 23 after losing to East Carolina.

== All-Conference players ==
Coaches All-Conference Selections

Position	Player	Class	Team
**First Team Offense (Coaches)**
QB	Rakeem Cato	SO	Marshall
RB	Zach Line	SR	SMU
RB	Latavius Murray	SR	UCF
RB	Darrin Reaves	SO	UAB
OL	Jacolby Ashworth	SR	Houston
OL	Brian DeShane	SR	Tulsa
OL	Jared Grigg	SR	Tulsa
OL	Chris Hubbard	SR	UAB
OL	Jordan Rae	SR	UCF
TE	Vance McDonald	SR	Rice
WR	Ryan Grant	JR	Tulane
WR	Justin Hardy	SO	East Carolina
WR	Tommy Shuler	SO	Marshall
**First Team Defense (Coaches)**
DL	Jamie Collins	SR	Southern Miss
DL	Troy Davis	SR	UCF
DL	Cory Dorris	SR	Tulsa
DL	Margus Hunt	SR	SMU
LB	DeAundre Brown	SR	Tulsa
LB	Ja'Gared Davis	SR	SMU
LB	Phillip Steward	SR	Houston
DB	Phillip Gaines	JR	Rice
DB	D. J. Hayden	SR	Houston
DB	Kemal Ishmael	SR	UCF
DB	Dexter McCoil	SR	Tulsa
**First Team Special Teams (Coaches)**
K	Cairo Santos	JR	Tulane
P	Richie Leone	JR	Houston
KR	Quincy McDuffie	SR	UCF
PR	J. J. Worton	SO	UCF
LS	Billy Johnson	GR	Tulane

Position	Player	Class	Team
**Second Team Offense (Coaches)**
QB	Blake Bortles	SO	UCF
RB	Vintavious Cooper	JR	East Carolina
RB	Charles Sims	JR	Houston
OL	Bryan Collins	SR	SMU
OL	Jordan Devey	SR	Memphis
OL	Trent Dupy	SR	Tulsa
OL	Will Simmons	JR	East Carolina
OL	Torrian Wilson	SO	UCF
TE	Gator Hoskins	JR	Marshall
WR	Aaron Dobson	SR	Marshall
WR	Keyarris Garrett	SO	Tulsa
WR	Darius Johnson	SR	SMU
**Second Team Defense (Coaches)**
DL	Michael Brooks	SR	East Carolina
DL	Johnnie Farms	JR	Memphis
DL	Martin Ifedi	SO	Memphis
DL	Jared St. John	SR	Tulsa
LB	Marvin Burdette	SR	UAB
LB	Derrell Johnson	JR	East Carolina
LB	Taylor Reed	SR	SMU
DB	Kenneth Acker	JR	SMU
DB	A. J. Bouye	SR	UCF
DB	Dominick LeGrande	GR	Marshall
DB	Marco Nelson	JR	Tulsa
**Second Team Special Teams (Coaches)**
K	Chris Boswell	JR	Rice
P	Ian Campbell	SR	UTEP
KR	Trey Watts	JR	Tulsa
PR	Justin Hardy	SO	East Carolina
LS	Brandon Hartson	SR	Houston
