= Pete Lembo =

American football player and coach (born 1970)

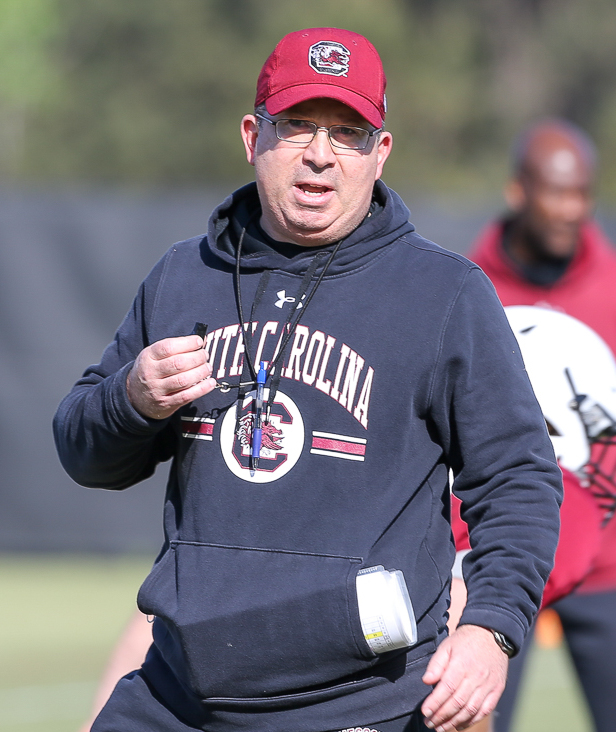
- Lembo with South Carolina in 2021

Current position
- Title: Head coach
- Team: Buffalo
- Conference: MAC
- Record: 22–14
- Annual salary: $790,000

Biographical details
- Born: April 16, 1970 (age 56)

Playing career
- 1988–1991: Georgetown
- Position: Center

Coaching career (HC unless noted)
- 1992–1993: Albany (GA)
- 1994–1996: Dartmouth (TE)
- 1997: Hampden–Sydney (OC/OL/RC)
- 1998–2000: Lehigh (AHC/OL/RC)
- 2001–2005: Lehigh
- 2006–2010: Elon
- 2011–2015: Ball State
- 2016–2017: Maryland (AHC/ST/TE)
- 2018: Rice (AHC/ST)
- 2019–2020: Memphis (AHC/ST)
- 2021–2023: South Carolina (AHC/ST)
- 2024–present: Buffalo

Head coaching record
- Overall: 134–79
- Bowls: 1–2
- Tournaments: 1–3 (NCAA D-I playoffs)

Accomplishments and honors

Championships
- 2 Patriot (2001, 2004)

Awards
- Eddie Robinson Award (2001); Patriot League Coach of the Year (2001); SoCon Coach of the Year (2007); Broyles Award Nominee (2019), Semi-Finalist (2022)

Peter A. Lembo (born April 16, 1970) is an American college football coach and former player. He is currently the head coach at the University at Buffalo, where he led the Bulls to a record number of victories in his first season as head coach. Previously, he was the special teams coordinator at the University of South Carolina, where, in 2022, he oversaw the highest rated special teams unit in college football. Lembo has enjoyed success in each of his four stops as a head coach, leading each program to at least nine wins and post season appearances. He has accumulated a 121–69 career record over a 16-year period. His 79–36 record in ten seasons at the FCS level makes him one of the winningest coaches in the history of that classification.

== Education and playing career ==
Lembo attended Monsignor Farrell High School on Staten Island, where he was a starter on the varsity football squad. He graduated in 1988. He attended Georgetown University, graduating with a Bachelor of Science in Business Administration in 1992. While at Georgetown, Lembo was a four-year starter at center and served as team captain of the Hoyas in 1991. He earned his graduate degree at the University at Albany, SUNY, graduating with a Master of Arts in Public Administration in 1994.

== Coaching career ==
=== Lehigh ===
Lembo became one of the youngest head coaches in all of Division I when he was named head coach at Lehigh University in February 2001. The Mountain Hawks managed at least eight wins in each of his five seasons as head coach. Lembo is the winningest head coach in Lehigh school history with a .759 winning percentage. His conference record of 26–7 (.788) puts him third among all Patriot League coaches in terms of winning percentage. Lembo's teams won two Patriot League championships and made two appearances in the FCS playoffs.

In 2001, Lembo led Lehigh to an undefeated regular season and an upset win over Hofstra in the first round of the NCAA playoffs. That season, Lehigh also won the prestigious Lambert Cup, was named the ECAC team of the year and finished ranked 5th in the nation. In 2002, the Mountain Hawks upset the University at Buffalo, an FBS level team from the Mid-American Conference. This marked Lehigh's first victory over an FBS (I-A) team since 1987. The Mountain Hawks reached #2 in the national polls in September 2002, the highest ranking in program history. Lehigh defeated 9th ranked Fordham in September 2003. In 2004, Lehigh defeated 18th ranked Colgate and won the Patriot League before facing eventual national champion James Madison in the first round of the FCS playoffs. The Mountain Hawks also knocked off undefeated Harvard in 2005, in a battle of top 15 ranked teams.

Lembo's Lehigh teams posted a 9–2 record against Ivy League opponents during his tenure, including an undefeated record against Harvard, Yale and Princeton in eight of those games. The Mountain Hawks, despite playing with need-based financial aid at that time, also held a winning record against teams from scholarship-based conferences.

Three of Lembo's student-athletes at Lehigh earned AP all-American recognition during his tenure as head coach. Defensive back Abdul Byron was selected in 2001, defensive end Tom Alfsen in 2004 and tight end Adam Bergen was a two-time selection in 2003 and 2004.

=== Elon ===
Lembo was the head football coach at Elon University in Elon, North Carolina for five seasons, from 2006 until 2010. His coaching record at Elon was 35–22. The Phoenix went 14–42 in the five seasons prior to Lembo's arrival. Lembo led the Phoenix to a 9–3 record (7–1 Southern Conference) and their first appearance in the FCS playoffs in 2009. His Elon teams set over 120 NCAA, Southern Conference and school records. He is one of only two football coaches in the Division I era at Elon to secure a winning career record. Two of Lembo's former assistant coaches at Elon – Rich Skrosky and Tony Trisciani – have since become head coaches for the Phoenix.

During Lembo's tenure, the Phoenix were ranked in the FCS top 25 polls from October 20, 2007, through October 9, 2010, for 34 straight weeks. Elon peaked as high as #3 in the nation in October 2008. Lembo's teams defeated nationally ranked opponents seven times from 2006 to 2010. The Elon program had just one win versus the FCS (I-AA) top 25 prior to that stretch. Elon knocked off nationally ranked Georgia Southern in back-to-back years (2007 and 2008) and secured a victory at #7 Wofford in 2007, defeating the highest ranked opponent since being classified in the Division I Football Championship Subdivision.

Elon enjoyed its only winning seasons in Southern Conference play in 2007, 2008, 2009 and 2010, during an 11-year affiliation with the league. After winning just three games in their first three seasons of SoCon play before his arrival, Lembo's teams managed an impressive 24–14 record in a conference that was among the most competitive in the FCS at that time. His career winning percentage at Elon is the best among head coaches since the institution moved to the Division I ranks and his 24 conference wins is also the highest among all Phoenix head coaches.

Under Lembo, Phoenix quarterback Scott Riddle (2007–2010) set NCAA records for the most passing yards by a freshman (3,738) and passing per game in a career (with 339.8). Riddle also tied the record for the most touchdown passes as a freshman (31). Riddle is fifth on the all-time list of FCS quarterbacks with 13,264 passing yards in his career.

Elon wide receiver Terrell Hudgins (2006–2009) holds NCAA records for the most passes caught in a career (395), career yards receiving (5,250), catches per game (8.78), the most games with 100 or more yards receiving (28) and the most games catching a touchdown pass (34). Some of these records were previously held by legendary receiver Jerry Rice. Hudgins is second all-time in catches in a single season (123 in 2009) and third in touchdown catches (with 52). Hudgins and teammate Michael Mayers hold the FCS record for most catches by a duo in a season (207 in 2007). Elon wide receiver Aaron Mellette ranked third in the FCS in catches per game in 2010 and was later drafted by the Baltimore Ravens.

=== Ball State ===
On December 19, 2010, Pete Lembo resigned as head football coach at Elon University to take the head coaching job at Ball State University. His contract at Ball State paid $450,000 per year, the 5th highest in the Mid-American Conference, and #119 among all college football coaches. He earned $514,250 in 2015. Lembo resigned December 22, 2015, to become the assistant head coach and special teams coordinator at Maryland. He compiled a 33–29 record and a 23–17 record in MAC games in five seasons with the Cardinals. He is the only head coach since Paul Schudel (1985–1994) to post a winning record at Ball State.

Some highlights from Coach Lembo's career at Ball State:

• The Cardinals set more than 60 school records during Lembo's tenure, including single-season records for points (501), total offense (6,199 yards), passing yards (4,214), touchdown passes (35) and total touchdowns (64) in 2013.

• Guided the Cardinals to a 10–3 overall record in 2013, including a second straight bowl appearance when Ball State played in the GoDaddy Bowl. It marks only the second time in 90 years of football the Cardinals have played in back-to-back bowl games and the third season of 10 or more wins.

• Led the Cardinals to a 7–1 MAC record in 2013 – only the fifth 7–1 or better MAC record since Ball State joined the league in 1975.

• The Cardinals' 19 wins in 2012 and 2013 tied for the most wins in back-to-back seasons in school history.

• Guided the Cardinals to four wins over teams from BCS conferences (Virginia, South Florida and Indiana twice). Ball State previously had one win in its entire history against teams from the BCS.

• First Ball State head coach in the school's history to win 30 games in first four seasons at the helm.

• Lembo's .600 winning percentage is the second best among Ball State head coaches through their first four seasons.

• Added the title of associate athletics director to his head football coaching position in March 2014.

• One of 20 coaches in country named to the 2013 Paul Bear Bryant National Coach of the Year Award Watch List.

• Earned his 100th career victory with a 27–24 win over Kent State in Ball State's 87th Homecoming Game in 2013.

• Led the Cardinals to a 27–20 win over #23 ranked Toledo in November 2012. This was Ball State's first win against a ranked team since 2002.

• Lembo coached several future NFL players including wide receiver Willie Snead, quarterback Keith Wenning, defensive end Jonathan Newsome, cornerback Eric Patterson and running back Jahwan Edwards, Ball State's all-time leading rusher.

=== Maryland ===
On December 22, 2015, Lembo joined the coaching staff at The University of Maryland. During his tenure with the Terps, Lembo's special teams were one of the top punt and kick blocking units in the country, tying for fifth nationally with nine blocks in two seasons. The Terps were stellar in kickoff return defense in 2016 and 2017, ranking second and third in the Big Ten (25th and 21st nationally).

Maryland ranked 11th out of 130 FBS programs in ESPN's Special Teams Efficiency rankings in 2017 after ranking 17th in his first year in College Park. The Terps also ranked third in the Big Ten in punt returns and fourth in kickoff returns in 2017. Maryland had a punt return for a touchdown against Rutgers in 2016 and a kickoff return for a touchdown against Ohio State in 2017.

Coach Lembo signed a contract for $350,000 per year with Maryland.

=== Rice ===
Despite a rebuilding season at Rice University in 2018, Lembo was able to improve the Owls special teams from 114th the previous year to 17th in ESPN's Special Teams Efficiency rankings. Rice ranked 6th in the FBS in kickoff return defense, allowing just 16.12 yards per return. This was also the least yards per return allowed at Rice University since the 1999 football season. The Owls ranked 14th nationally in kickoff returns, averaging 24.41 per return. This was the best average per return at Rice since the 1973 season. In net punting, Rice set a school record and finished 17th in the FBS, netting an impressive 40.11 per punt. Rice's challenging out-of-conference schedule in 2018 featured quality opponents including LSU, Wake Forest, Houston and Hawaii.

Under Lembo's guidance, senior punter and kickoff specialist Jack Fox was named the Conference USA Special Teams Player of the Year in 2018. Fox finished the season ranked 8th in the FBS in punting, averaging 45.45 yards per punt. Fox broke a school record with a long punt of 76 yards vs. North Texas. He had 26 punts of over 50 yards and placed 31 punts inside the opponent's 20 yard line. Fox also successfully executed two fake punts in 2018. Fox was later invited to participate in the NFL Combine and signed a free agent contract with the Kansas City Chiefs. He is currently the starting punter for the Detroit Lions. Senior place kicker Haden Tobola, who only connected on one field goal the previous season, made 10 of 11 kicks in 2018 and ranked 3rd in the entire FBS in field goal percentage. Senior kick returner Austin Walter ranked 10th in the FBS in kickoff return average with 25.8 per return.

Lembo's first recruit at Rice, long snapper Campbell Riddle, earned a scholarship following his first season in 2018 and went on to become a co-captain for the Owls in the 2020 and 2021 seasons.

=== Memphis ===
Success on special teams played a major role in a historic 12-win season at Memphis in 2019. The Tigers won their first outright conference championship since 1969 and landed a berth in the Cotton Bowl – recognizing them as the top Group of Five program in the country. Memphis spent much of the season as the top ranked special teams unit in the country as per ESPN's Special Teams Efficiency rankings. The Tigers finished the 2019 regular season ranked second among 130 FBS programs as per ESPN. Championship Analytics, Inc. gave the Tigers their highest rating in the FBS for "Special Teams Points Added" and overall productivity. Memphis ended the 2019 season ranked 6th in the FBS in the overall special teams rankings compiled by the data analysts at Football Outsiders.

The Tigers ranked 7th among FBS teams in average yards per kickoff return at 26.22 while leading the country in total kickoff return yardage. Memphis also ranked first in average starting field position after kickoff returns (33.3 yard line), 7.6 yards per return better than the 2019 FBS average. The Tigers had ten kickoff returns that allowed their offense to start drives beyond the 40 yard line.

Senior Antonio Gibson finished 8th in the nation in yards per return (28.0) and was named the AAC's Co-Special Teams Player of the Year for his efforts. Gibson had several explosive returns in 2019, including a 97-yard return for a touchdown in a critical AAC West showdown against SMU at the Liberty Bowl. Senior cornerback Chris Claybrooks had a 94-yard kickoff return for a touchdown to open the game against Cincinnati, helping the Tigers earn a rematch versus the Bearcats a week later in the AAC championship. Claybrooks averaged an impressive 30.7 per kickoff return in 2019. In an important mid-season conference game against Tulane, the Tigers had three explosive returns, all by Claybrooks. Earlier in the season, Cornerback Gabe Rogers returned a kickoff 99 yards against Navy, cutting the Midshipmen's lead and giving the Tigers critical momentum in a key AAC West contest. The Tigers finished the 2019 regular season ranked first in the AAC in yards per kickoff return.

The aggressive-minded Tiger special teams finished 2019 tied for 6th in the FBS in blocked kicks. Memphis blocked two punts as well as two field goal attempts. Memphis made statistical improvements in other important areas such as net punt and kickoff coverage defense in 2019 under Lembo's direction. The Tigers only allowed one opponent kickoff return to cross the 30 yard line in 14 games. Memphis also converted a fake punt against Tulsa, recovered a surprise onside kick versus Louisiana-Monroe and scored a 2-point conversion on a muddle huddle play in the same game. Red-shirt Sophomore punter Adam Williams averaged 44.8 yards per punt, including ten punts of over 50 yards and 13 punts inside the 20-yard line.

Perhaps the most notable improvement was the Memphis field goal unit. Junior kicker Riley Patterson, who was a modest 15 of 20 in 2018, made an impressive 92 percent of his field goals in 2019 (23 of 25). Patterson made several kicks of over 50 yards and was named first team All-AAC for his efforts. In the conference championship game against Cincinnati, Patterson hit two field goals of 50 or more yards, playing a critical role in the Tigers' 29–24 victory. In Memphis's Cotton Bowl loss against #10 Penn State, Patterson had six field goals – setting both a Cotton Bowl record as well as a record for field goals in NCAA bowl game history.

Patterson's holder, junior Preston Brady, received the Mortell Award as the nation's most outstanding holder for his performance in 2019. The versatile Brady also recovered an onside kick to seal the victory against 16th ranked SMU and scored a 2-point conversion on a muddle huddle play against Louisiana-Monroe.

For his efforts, Lembo was nominated for the annual Broyles Award, recognizing the top assistant coach in the country. Phil Steele's College Football Magazine named Lembo the 2019 Special Teams Coordinator of the Year. Lembo was also selected as one of three finalists for the Footballscoop Special Teams Coordinator of the Year for the 2019 season.

The Tiger special teams units continued to make a positive impact during the turbulent 2020 season, as Memphis finished 8–3 with a 25–10 victory over Florida Atlantic in the Montgomery Bowl. The Tigers finished tied for first in the FBS, allowing no blocked kicks or punts the entire season. They also completed the 2020 season tied for seventh in the FBS by blocking three kicks. The Memphis kickoff coverage unit ranked 16th in the FBS, yielding an average of just 17.42 per return. Senior kicker Riley Patterson hit the game winning field goal as time expired to secure a 30–27 Memphis win over rival Houston in the Liberty Bowl. Patterson was selected to the Reece's Senior Bowl as one of the top kickers in the nation. Junior wide receiver Calvin Austin returned a punt 64 yards for a touchdown in Memphis's home win over Stephen F. Austin.

Coach Lembo made a salary of $305,000 per year while at Memphis.

=== South Carolina ===
Lembo was added to the coaching staff at South Carolina in December 2020 as the associate head coach and special teams coordinator. Coach Lembo was initially earning $465,000 per year on a contract lasting until 2024. On December 13, 2022, the USC Board of Trustees approved a new deal for Lembo which increased his pay to $725,000 per year and extended his contract until the end of 2025.

Under Lembo's tutelage, the Gamecock special teams had arguably their best season on record in 2022. Carolina boasted the nation's top-ranked special teams unit, earning the No. 1 spot in ESPN's special teams efficiency ranking. Carolina ranked fourth in the country in punt returns (16.6), fifth in kickoff returns (25.1), seventh in net punting (42.8), 23rd in opponent kickoff returns (17.3) and 27th in opponent punt returns (4.6). The Gamecocks tied for third in the country with six blocked kicks and tied for second with five blocked punts. Carolina scored five special teams touchdowns – two blocked punt returns, one kick return, one fake punt and one fake field goal. Junior punter Kai Kroeger was an All-American and first-team All-SEC selection. Long snapper Hunter Rogers earned second-team All-SEC honors. Placekicker Mitch Jeter was a perfect 11-for-11 in field goal attempts, including a pair of 50-plus yarders. Jeter and Eddie Leopard (12-for-12 in 1980) are the only kickers in school history to make all of their field goal attempts in a season with a minimum of 10 attempts.

Following the successful 2022 campaign, Lembo was named a Broyles Award Assistant Coach of the Year Semifinalist, a FootballScoop Special Teams Coach of the Year Finalist and received college football analyst Phil Steele's Special Teams Coach of the Year accolades.

Under Lembo's direction, the Gamecock special teams units made an impact on the team's 7–6 finish and Duke's Mayo Bowl victory to cap the 2021 season. South Carolina blocked four kicks (three punts and a field goal), tied for second in the SEC and 10th in the country. The last time South Carolina blocked four kicks was the 2014 season. The three blocked punts tied for first in the SEC, 7th in the nation and were the most at South Carolina since the 2000 season. The Gamecocks were sound in punt and field goal protection and did not surrender a blocked punt or kick the entire 2021 season.

Senior kicker Parker White was 16 of 17 on field goal attempts (.941) and became the school's all-time leader in points scored with 368. The senior also tied the school record for field goals made with 72. White hit a game winning field goal against East Carolina in the second week of the season. He was also perfect on extra point attempts. Sophomore punter Kai Kroeger boomed two punts of over 70 yards as the Gamecocks finished the season with a 40.3 net punt average. Kroeger also tossed a 44-yard touchdown pass on a fake punt vs. Tennessee. The Gamecocks converted a pair of two point conversions off of muddle huddle plays, including a pass by Kroeger.

South Carolina's 24.0 average per kickoff return in 2021 ranked 24th in the FBS and was the second best in program history since the Gamecocks joined the SEC in 1992. South Carolina's kickoff coverage was also strong, finishing 25th nationally, fourth in the SEC and third among all prior units at South Carolina since 1992 with an 18.1 average per return.

In his three seasons leading the special teams at South Carolina, Lembo's units blocked an impressive 11 of their opponent's punts while not having a single punt blocked, making the Gamecocks one of only a handful of FBS teams to accomplish such an impactful differential in productivity over that time period.

=== Buffalo ===
On January 21, 2024, Lembo was named the head coach at Buffalo. On his original 5-year contract, he earned a base salary of $725,000 before bonuses for wins and postseason appearances.

Lembo had the most successful debut season of any head coach in UB Football history in 2024 when he led the Bulls to a 9–4 overall record and 6–2 mark in Mid-American Conference play. The nine wins tied for the second most in school history and were the most by a first-year head coach at UB.

He led Buffalo to its fourth bowl win in program history, defeating Liberty, 26–7, in the Bahamas Bowl. It capped a stellar finish to the season that saw the Bulls win their final five games of the year for the first time since 1959. UB's six-win improvement from 2023 tied for the fourth best turnaround in the nation.

The signature win for the Bulls in 2024 was a 23–20 overtime victory over 23rd-ranked Northern Illinois. It was Buffalo's second ever win over a nationally ranked team.

Buffalo had 10 players named All-MAC, including 2024 MAC Defensive Player of the Year Shaun Dolac. The standout linebacker was also UB football's first ever Consensus All-American.

Under Lembo, the Bulls had their best semester in the classroom. The team's combined 3.18 grade point average was the highest in program history.

== Head coaching record ==
Year	Team	Overall	Conference	Standing	Bowl/playoffs	Rank^{#}
Lehigh Mountain Hawks (Patriot League) (2001–2005)
2001	Lehigh	11–1	7–0	1st	L NCAA Division I-AA Quarterfinal	5
2002	Lehigh	8–4	4–3	4th		
2003	Lehigh	8–3	6–1	2nd		23
2004	Lehigh	9–3	5–1	T–1st	L NCAA Division I-AA First Round	15
2005	Lehigh	8–3	4–2	3rd		
Lehigh:		44–14	26–7			
Elon Phoenix (Southern Conference) (2006–2010)
2006	Elon	5–6	2–5	T–5th		
2007	Elon	7–4	4–3	T–3rd		23
2008	Elon	8–4	6–2	3rd		17
2009	Elon	9–3	7–1	2nd	L NCAA Division I First Round	9
2010	Elon	6–5	5–3	T–3rd		
Elon:		35–22	24–14			
Ball State Cardinals (Mid-American Conference) (2011–2015)
2011	Ball State	6–6	4–4	T–4th (West)		
2012	Ball State	9–4	6–2	T–2nd (West)	L Beef 'O' Brady's	
2013	Ball State	10–3	7–1	2nd (West)	L GoDaddy Bowl	
2014	Ball State	5–7	4–4	5th (West)		
2015	Ball State	3–9	2–6	5th (West)		
Ball State:		33–29	23–17			
Buffalo Bulls (Mid-American Conference) (2024–present)
2024	Buffalo	9–4	6–2	T–3rd	W Bahamas	
2025	Buffalo	5–7	4–4	T–6th		
2026	Buffalo	8–3	6–1			
Buffalo:		22–14	16–7			
Total:		134–79				
National championship Conference title Conference division title or championship game berth
^{#}Rankings from final Sports Network poll.
