= Quincy McDuffie =

American football player (born 1990)

No. 14, 16
- Positions: Wide receiver, kickoff returner, punt returner

Personal information
- Born: September 24, 1990 (age 36); Orlando, Florida, U.S.
- Listed height: 5 ft 10 in (1.78 m)
- Listed weight: 178 lb (81 kg)

Career information
- High school: Edgewater (Orlando)
- College: UCF
- NFL draft: 2013: undrafted

Career history
- Denver Broncos (2013)*; Hamilton Tiger-Cats (2014–2015); Winnipeg Blue Bombers (2016); Dallas Cowboys (2017)*; Ottawa Redblacks (2017)
- * Offseason or practice squad member only

Awards and highlights
- First-team All-American (2012); C-USA Special Teams Player of the Year (2012); 2× First-team All-C-USA (2010, 2012)
- Stats at Pro Football Reference
- Stats at CFL.ca (archive)

Quincy McDuffie (born September 24, 1990) is an American former professional football player who was a wide receiver and return specialist in the Canadian Football League (CFL). He played college football for the UCF Knights. He was named to the All-Conference USA first-team in 2010 and 2012. McDuffie was also a member of the Denver Broncos, Hamilton Tiger-Cats, Winnipeg Blue Bombers, Dallas Cowboys and Ottawa Redblacks.

== Early life ==
McDuffie played on the track and football teams at Edgewater High School. He ran a 46-second quarter-mile and was the district champion and regional champion in the 200 meters in track in 2008. He played defensive back and wide receiver in football.

== College career ==
McDuffie attended the University of Central Florida and played for the Knights from 2009 to 2012. As a true freshman in 2009, he had 8 receptions for 126 yards, 11 rushes for 55 yards, and 39 kickoff returns for 944 yards. He had a 95-yard kickoff return for a touchdown in his first collegiate game.

The following year, McDuffie had 13 receptions for 144 yards, 10 rushes for 54 yards, and 27 kick returns for 869 yards. He had kickoff returns of 93 yards and 95 yards for touchdowns. He was a first-team All-Conference USA selection.

McDuffie had 43 receptions for 482 yards, 12 rushes for 132 yards, and 7 kickoff returns for 106 yards in 2011.

In 2012, McDuffie had 28 receptions for 350 yards, 19 rushes for 170 yards, and 17 kickoff returns for 582 yards. His 34.2 yard average on kick returns ranked first in the nation. In an October game against Marshall, McDuffie set a school and Conference USA record by returning two kickoffs for touchdowns – one 97 yards and the other 98 yards – in the same game. In November, he scored a touchdown on a 99-yard kickoff return against ECU. McDuffie was named Conference USA Special Teams Player of the Year and was a first-team All-Conference USA selection. He set school records for career kickoff returns, with 90; career kickoff return yards, with 2,501; and career kickoff return touchdowns, with 6.

== Professional career ==
McDuffie was signed as an undrafted free agent by the Denver Broncos on April 28, 2013. He was waived by the team on August 26, 2013, after suffering a hamstring injury.

McDuffie was signed as a free agent by the Hamilton Tiger-Cats on May 27, 2014. In two seasons in Hamilton, McDuffie only played in two games, catching 2 passes for 8 yards.

On January 22, 2016 McDuffie signed with the Winnipeg Blue Bombers. McDuffie played in 13 games for the Bombers in 2016, mostly playing as a kick and punt return specialist.

On January 31, 2017, McDuffie signed a reserve/future contract with the Dallas Cowboys. He was waived on June 2, 2017.

On August 1, 2017, McDuffie signed a two-year contract with the Ottawa Redblacks. He was released by the Redblacks on April 3, 2018.

== Personal ==
McDuffie was born in Orlando, Florida to Quincy Howard and Vonetta Burch. He has a younger brother, Alton Howard, who played receiver, running back and defensive back in his junior year at Edgewater High School and College ball for the Tennessee Volunteers. McDuffie is 5 feet, 10 inches tall and weighs 178 pounds. His major is general studies, with minors in coaching and hospitality management.
