= Latavius Murray =

American football player (born 1990)

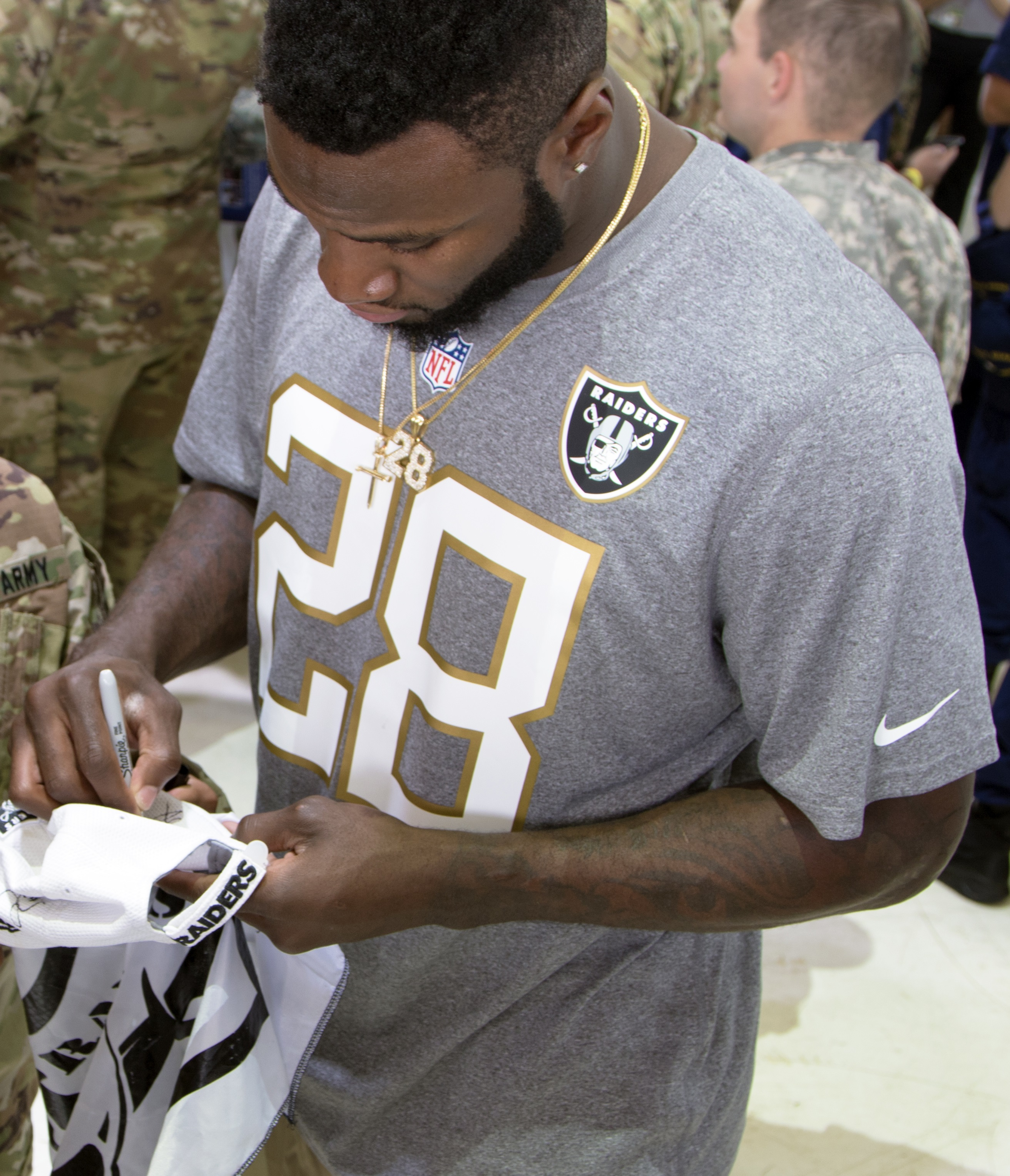
- Murray at the 2016 Pro Bowl

No. 28, 25
- Position: Running back

Personal information
- Born: January 18, 1990 (age 36); Titusville, Florida, U.S.
- Listed height: 6 ft 3 in (1.91 m)
- Listed weight: 230 lb (104 kg)

Career information
- High school: Onondaga Central (Nedrow, New York)
- College: UCF (2008–2012)
- NFL draft: 2013: 6th round, 181st overall pick

Career history
- Oakland Raiders (2013–2016); Minnesota Vikings (2017–2018); New Orleans Saints (2019–2020); Baltimore Ravens (2021); New Orleans Saints (2022); Denver Broncos (2022); Buffalo Bills (2023)

Awards and highlights
- Pro Bowl (2015); First-team All-C-USA (2012); Liberty Bowl MVP (2010); UCF Athletics Hall of Fame (2022)

Career NFL statistics
- Rushing yards: 6,552
- Rushing average: 4.2
- Rushing touchdowns: 59
- Receptions: 239
- Receiving yards: 1,620
- Receiving touchdowns: 2
- Stats at Pro Football Reference

Latavius Rashard Murray (born January 18, 1990) is an American former professional football player who was a running back in the National Football League (NFL). He played college football for the UCF Knights and was selected by the Oakland Raiders in the sixth round of the 2013 NFL draft, with whom he earned Pro Bowl honors in 2015. Murray also played for the Minnesota Vikings, New Orleans Saints, Baltimore Ravens, Denver Broncos, and Buffalo Bills.

== Early life ==
Murray was born in Titusville, Florida, and attended Onondaga Central High School in Onondaga, New York, where he was a three-sport athlete in football, basketball, and track. In football, Murray was a three-time All-league and All-Central New York selection. As a sophomore, he was a third-team All-state honoree following a 1,609-yard, 14-touchdown season. Murray was first-team as a junior, rushing for 2,030 yards and 30 touchdowns. He was first-team again as a senior and was named the 2007 Gatorade Football Player of the Year in the state of New York, rushing for 2,194 yards with 28 touchdowns on offense, while also recording 78 tackles, three forced fumbles and two interceptions on defense. Murray also was named as the Class D Player of the Year and First-team All-State by the NYSSWA.

Regarded as a three-star recruit, Murray was ranked as the No. 5 prospect in the state of New York by Rivals.com, No. 6 according to Scout.com. He chose UCF over scholarship offers from Boston College, Maryland, and Syracuse, among others.

College recruiting
Name	Hometown	School	Height	Weight	40^{‡}	Commit date
Latavius Murray; Running back	Nedrow, New York	Onondaga Central	6 ft 3 in (1.91 m)	223 lb (101 kg)	4.64	Sep 28, 2007
Latavius Murray; Running back	Recruit ratings: Scout: Rivals:					
Overall recruit ranking: Scout: 132 (RB) Rivals: NR (OLB), NR (National), 5 (New York)
‡ Refers to 40-yard dash; Note: In many cases, Scout, Rivals, 247Sports, On3, and ESPN may conflict in their listings of height, weight and 40 time.; In these cases, the average was taken. ESPN grades are on a 100-point scale.; Sources: "2008 UCF Football Commitments". Rivals.; "2008 UCF Football Recruiting Commits". Scout.; "Scout.com Team Recruiting Rankings". Scout.; "2008 Team Ranking". Rivals.com.

== College career ==
Murray played college football at the University of Central Florida.

Murray made his collegiate debut against South Carolina State and rushed for 43 yards and two touchdowns. As a freshman, he finished with 46 carries for 132 yards and three touchdowns. Murray tore his ACL during the offseason after his freshman year while playing basketball.

After redshirting in 2009, Murray returned to the Knights' backfield in 2010. On November 20 against Tulane, he had his best game of the season, rushing for 146 yards and a touchdown. Two weeks later against SMU, he finished with 94 rushing yards and 21 receiving yards and first collegiate receiving touchdown. In his redshirt sophomore season, Murray was named Conference USA Championship MVP and also was named AutoZone Liberty Bowl MVP for his performance against Georgia in which he rushed for 104 yards and scored the game-winning touchdown. Murray finished the 2010 season with 111 carries for 637 yards and 11 touchdowns to go along with five receptions for 47 yards and a touchdown.

Murray started his junior season rushing for 36 yards and two touchdowns against Charleston Southern. In the next game against Boston College, Murray had 72 rushing yards and a touchdown. He was mostly held in check up to the end of the regular season. On November 19 against East Carolina, Murray had 87 rushing yards and a touchdown. In the last game of the season against UTEP, he had a season-high 233 rushing yards with two rushing touchdowns. Following the end of the season, Murray was selected as the team's MVP and offensive player of the year.

As a senior, Murray was an All-C-USA First-team selection and was named to Phil Steele's All-C-USA First-team. He was named to the College Football Performance Awards All-Purpose Trophy Watch List and was also selected to the College Football Performance Awards Special Teams Watch List. Murray was named to the Doak Walker Award Watch List. On August 30, 2012, he started the season with 108 rushing yards and a touchdown against Akron. On October 20, he started a four-game stretch where he recorded 192 yards and two touchdowns, 156 yards and three touchdowns, 155 yards and two touchdowns, and 117 rushing yards and a rushing touchdown in those games. Murray finished the season with 198 carries for 1,106 yards and 15 touchdowns to go along with 27 receptions for 231 yards and four touchdowns.

Murray finished his collegiate career with 453 carries for 2,424 yards and 37 touchdowns to go along with 50 receptions for 524 yards and six touchdowns.

== Professional career ==
=== Pre-draft ===
Murray was regarded as a sixth to seventh round selection according to CBSSports.com.

Pre-draft measurables
Height	Weight	Arm length	Hand span	Wingspan	40-yard dash	10-yard split	20-yard split	20-yard shuttle	Three-cone drill	Vertical jump	Broad jump	Bench press
6 ft 2 5/8 in (1.90 m)	223 lb (101 kg)	33 5/8 in (0.85 m)	9 1/8 in (0.23 m)	6 ft 7 5/8 in (2.02 m)	4.38 s	1.48 s	2.56 s	4.36 s	6.81 s	36 in (0.91 m)	10 ft 4 in (3.15 m)	22 reps
All values from Central Florida Pro Day

Murray was not invited to the NFL Combine, but garnered much attention with an impressive performance at Central Florida's Pro Day. He weighed in at 6-foot-2 5/8 and 223 pounds, ran the 40-yard dash in 4.4 and 4.38 seconds, registered a 10-foot-4 broad jump and a 36-inch vertical jump, and ran 4.36 seconds in the short shuttle and 6.81 seconds in the 3-cone.

=== Oakland Raiders ===
==== 2013 season ====
Murray was selected by the Oakland Raiders with the 181st overall pick in the sixth round of the 2013 NFL draft. He was the 15th running back to be selected in that year's draft. On June 6, 2013, Raiders signed Murray to a four-year, $2.26 million contract with $106,200 guaranteed and a signing bonus of $106,200.

On August 27, 2013, Murray was placed on injured reserve with an ankle injury, ending his rookie season before it even started.

==== 2014 season ====
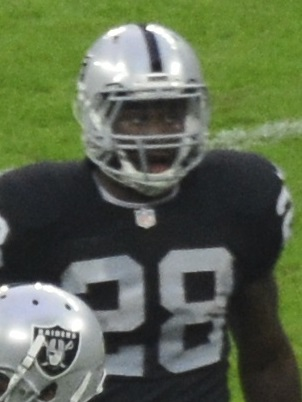
Murray in 2014

After being third on the depth chart for the first half of the season behind veterans Darren McFadden and Maurice Jones-Drew, the Raiders turned to Murray in Week 11 to provide a spark after ineffectiveness by McFadden and Jones-Drew all year. He responded by totaling 59 yards on seven carries during the 13–6 road loss to the San Diego Chargers.

On November 20, 2014, Murray had with four carries for 112 yards and two touchdowns, marking his first career touchdown against the Kansas City Chiefs. It also marked the first rushing touchdown the Chiefs defense allowed all season, and Murray's 90-yard touchdown marked the longest rush for the Raiders that year. His solid performance contributed to the Raiders' first victory of the season. After having success on his first three attempts, Murray suffered a concussion on his fourth carry and was taken out of the game.

Murray returned from injury in Week 14 against the San Francisco 49ers and recorded 23 carries for 76 yards during the 24–13 victory. In the next game against the Chiefs, he earned his first NFL start and had 12 carries for 59 yards during the 31–13 road loss. The following week against the Buffalo Bills, Murray had his second consecutive start and rushed 16 times for 86 yards in the narrow 26–24 victory.

Murray finished the 2014 season with 82 carries for 424 yards and two touchdowns to go along with 17 receptions for 143 yards in 15 games and three starts.

==== 2015 season ====
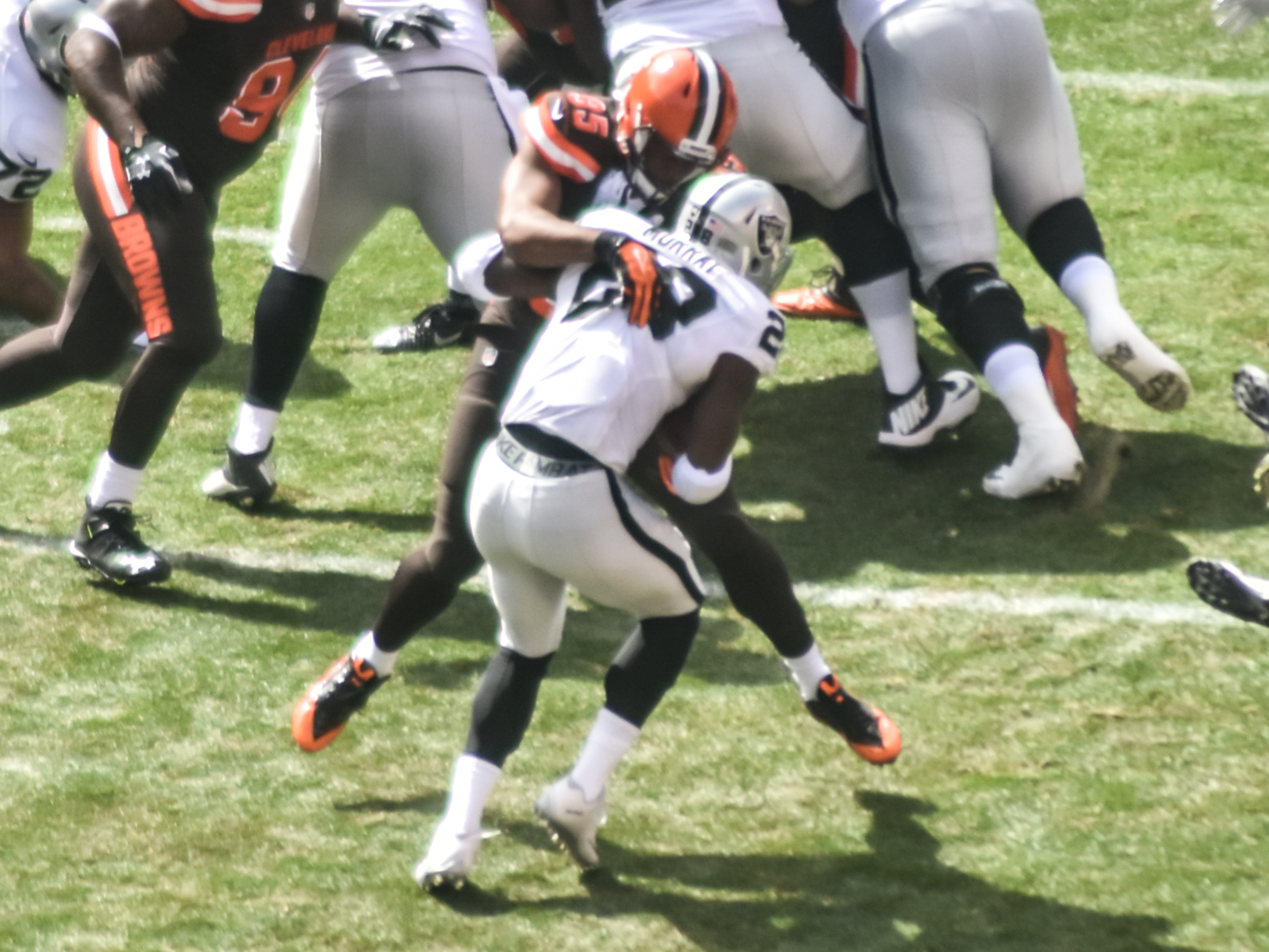
Murray in 2015

Murray entered the season as the Raiders' number one tailback and was expected by the Raiders to receive most of the carries after the retirement of Maurice Jones-Drew and the departure of Darren McFadden. As expected, Murray began the season as the Raiders' starting running back and had 11 carries for 44 yards to go along with seven receptions for 36 yards during the season-opening 33–13 loss to the Cincinnati Bengals. In the next game against the Baltimore Ravens, he rushed 15 times for 65 yards and his first touchdown of the season during the 37–33 victory. The following week against the Cleveland Browns, Murray ran for a season-high 139 yards and a touchdown on 26 carries in the 27–20 victory.

During a Week 7 37–29 road victory over the Chargers, Murray rushed 15 times for 85 yards and a touchdown. In the next game against the New York Jets, he had 20 carries for 113 yards during the 34–20 victory. The following week against the Pittsburgh Steelers, Murray recorded 17 carries for 96 yards in the 38–35 road loss.

During a Week 14 34–20 loss to the Chiefs, Murray had 20 carries for 86 yards and a touchdown. Three weeks later against the Chargers on Christmas Eve, he became the first Raider to reach the 1,000-yard rushing mark since Darren McFadden did so in 2010. Murray finished the 23–20 overtime victory with 19 carries for 79 yards and a touchdown to go along with five receptions for 38 yards.

Murray finished the 2015 season with 266 carries for 1,066 yards and six touchdowns to go along with 41 receptions for 232 yards in 16 games and starts.

==== 2016 season ====
Murray began the season with a rushing touchdown in three straight games against the New Orleans Saints, Atlanta Falcons, and Tennessee Titans. During a Week 7 33–16 road victory over the Jacksonville Jaguars, he rushed 18 times for 59 yards and two touchdowns. Two weeks later against the Denver Broncos, Murray had 20 carries for 114 yards and three touchdowns to go along with a 13-yard reception in the 30–20 victory.

During a Week 12 35–32 victory over the Carolina Panthers, Murray recorded 19 carries for 45 yards and a touchdown to go along with three receptions for 43 yards. In the next game against the Bills, he had 20 carries for 82 yards and two touchdowns to go along with three receptions for 23 yards during the 38–24 victory. The following week against the Chiefs on Thursday Night Football, Murray rushed 22 times for 103 yards and a touchdown in the 21–13 road loss.

Murray finished the 2016 season with 195 carries for 788 yards and a career-high 12 touchdowns to go along with 33 receptions for 264 yards in 14 games and 12 starts. The Raiders finished second in the AFC West with a 12–4 record and qualified for the playoffs as the #5-seed. Murray made his playoff debut in the Wild Card Round against the Houston Texans, recording 12 carries for 39 yards and his first postseason touchdown to go along with a 12-yard reception during the 27–14 road loss.

=== Minnesota Vikings ===
==== 2017 season ====
On March 16, 2017, Murray signed a three-year contract with the Minnesota Vikings. In his opening statement to Vikings fans, Murray stated on his Instagram account: "There wasn't a thought in my mind to try and wear or ask for the No. 28. I have too much respect for Adrian Peterson and so much respect for what he's done and what he means to this organization." During his first press conference as a Viking, Murray announced that he would be wearing #25 in honor of his best friend, who had died in 2016. On March 22, it was revealed that Murray underwent ankle surgery.

During the season-opening 29–19 victory over the Saints on Monday Night Football, Murray had two carries for six yards in his Vikings debut, ultimately being out-shined by rookie Dalvin Cook. However, Cook tore his ACL three weeks later in a 14–7 loss to the Detroit Lions, creating an opportunity for Murray.

During a Week 5 20–17 road victory over the Chicago Bears on Monday Night Football, Murray earned his first start of the season and finished with 12 carries for 31 yards and two receptions for 12 yards. Two weeks later against the Baltimore Ravens, he recorded 18 carries for 117 yards and his first touchdown of the season in the 24–16 victory.

During a Week 10 38–30 road victory over the Washington Redskins, Murray rushed 17 times for 68 yards and a touchdown. In the next game against the Los Angeles Rams, he had 15 carries for 95 yards and two touchdowns during the 24–7 victory. The following week against the Lions on Thanksgiving, Murray recorded 20 carries for 84 yards and a touchdown in the 30–23 road victory.

During a Week 15 34–7 victory over the Bengals, Murray had 20 carries for 76 yards and a touchdown to go along with a 28-yard reception. In the regular season finale against the Bears, he recorded 20 carries for 111 yards and two touchdowns during the 23–10 victory.

Murray finished the 2017 season with 216 carries for 842 yards and eight touchdowns to go along with 15 receptions for 103 yards in 16 games and 11 starts. The Vikings finished atop the NFC North with a 13–3 record and qualified for the playoffs as the #2-seed. During the 29–24 victory over the Saints in the Divisional Round, Murray recorded 19 carries for 50 yards and a touchdown to go along with two receptions for 17 yards. In the NFC Championship Game against the Philadelphia Eagles, he was limited to six carries for 18 yards and two receptions for 11 yards during the 38–7 loss.

==== 2018 season ====
In the first five games of the season, Murray totaled 30 carries for 106 yards and nine receptions for 60 yards in a limited role. During a Week 6 27–17 victory against the Arizona Cardinals, he rushed 24 times for a career-high 155 yards and a touchdown. In the next game against the Jets, Murray had 15 carries for 69 yards and two touchdowns during the 37–17 victory. The following week against the Saints on Sunday Night Football, he recorded 13 carries for 56 yards and a touchdown to go along with five receptions for 39 yards in the 30–20 loss.

During a Week 9 24–9 victory over the Lions, Murray had 10 carries for 31 yards and a touchdown to go along with a 16-yard reception. During a Week 15 41–17 victory over the Dolphins, he rushed 15 times for 68 yards and a touchdown.

Murray finished the 2018 season with 140 carries for 578 yards and six touchdowns to go along with 22 receptions for 141 yards in 16 games and six starts.

=== New Orleans Saints ===
==== 2019 season ====
On March 13, 2019, Murray signed a four-year, $14.4 million contract with the Saints.

Murray made his Saints debut in the season opener against the Texans on Monday Night Football, rushing six times for 43 yards and a 30-yard touchdown during the narrow 30–28 victory. During Week 7 against the Bears, he recorded 27 carries for 119 yards and two touchdowns to go along with five receptions for 31 yards in the 36–25 road victory. In the next game against the Cardinals, Murray had 21 carries for 102 yards and a touchdown to go along with nine receptions for 55 yards and his first receiving touchdown during the 31–9 victory.

During a Week 12 34–31 victory over the Panthers, Murray rushed seven times for 64 yards and a touchdown. Two weeks later against the 49ers, he had seven carries for 69 yards and three receptions for 25 yards in the narrow 48–46 loss. In the regular season finale against the Panthers, Murray recorded 17 carries for 61 yards and a 14-yard reception during the 42–10 road victory.

Murray finished the 2019 season with 146 carries for 637 yards and five touchdowns to go along with 34 receptions for 235 yards and a touchdown in 16 games and eight starts. The Saints finished the season atop the NFC South with a 13–3 record and qualified for the playoffs as the #3-seed. During the Wild Card Round against his former team, the Vikings, Murray had five carries for 21 yards and a four-yard reception in the 26–20 overtime loss.

==== 2020 season ====
During a Week 4 35–29 road victory over the Lions, Murray had 14 carries for 64 yards and his first two touchdowns of the season to go along with a 19-yard reception. During Week 12 against the Broncos, he rushed 19 times for 124 yards and two touchdowns in the 31–3 road victory. Murray was placed on the reserve/COVID-19 list by the team on January 2, 2021, and was activated four days later.

Murray finished the 2020 season with 146 carries for 656 yards and four touchdowns to go along with 23 receptions for 176 yards and a touchdown in 15 games and seven starts. The Saints finished the season atop the NFC South with a 12–4 record and qualified for the playoffs as the #2-seed. During the Wild Card Round against the Bears, Murray recorded four carries for nine yards to go along with two receptions for 11 yards and a touchdown in the 21–9 victory. He recorded no statistics during the 30–20 Divisional Round loss to the Tampa Bay Buccaneers.

On September 7, 2021, Murray was released after refusing to take a pay cut.

=== Baltimore Ravens ===
On September 10, 2021, the Ravens signed Murray following season-ending injuries to J. K. Dobbins, Justice Hill, and Gus Edwards.

Murray made his Ravens debut in the season-opening 33–27 overtime road loss to his former team, the Las Vegas Raiders, recording 10 carries for 28 yards and a touchdown. In the next game against the Chiefs, Murray had nine carries for 36 yards and a touchdown during the narrow 36–35 victory. Two weeks later against the Broncos, Murray was named the starter and finished the 23–7 road victory with 18 carries for 59 yards and a touchdown.

During a Week 6 34–6 victory over the Los Angeles Chargers, Murray recorded nine carries for 44 yards and a touchdown. He missed the next three games due to an ankle injury. Murray returned in Week 12 against the Bears and finished the 16–13 road victory with 10 carries for 32 yards. Three weeks later against the Browns, he rushed for a one-yard touchdown in the narrow 24–22 road loss. In the regular season finale against the Steelers, Murray had 16 carries for 150 yards and a touchdown during the 16–13 loss.

Murray finished the 2021 season with 119 carries for 501 yards and six touchdowns to go along with 10 receptions for 75 yards in 14 games and six starts.

=== New Orleans Saints (second stint) ===
Murray was signed to the Saints' practice squad on September 13, 2022. He was elevated to the active roster on October 1. Murray played in only one game for the Saints, a Week 4 28–25 loss to the Vikings, where he had 11 carries for 57 yards and a touchdown to go along with an eight-yard reception.

=== Denver Broncos ===
On October 4, 2022, Murray was signed off the Saints' practice squad by the Denver Broncos following a season-ending injury to Javonte Williams.

Murray made his Broncos debut in Week 6 against the Chargers on Monday Night Football, rushing 15 times for 66 yards during the 19–16 overtime road loss. In the next game against the Jets, he had eight carries for 24 yards and a touchdown during the 16–9 loss. The following week against the Jaguars, Murray recorded 14 carries for 46 yards and a touchdown to go along with a 13-yard reception in the 21–17 road victory.

During Week 11 against his former team, the Raiders, Murray had 17 carries for 49 yards and a touchdown to go along with four receptions for 23 yards in the 22–16 overtime loss. In the next game against the Panthers, he rushed 13 times for 92 yards during the 23–10 road loss. Three weeks later against the Cardinals, Murray recorded 24 carries for 130 yards and a touchdown to go along with a 12-yard reception in the 24–15 victory. In the regular season against the Chargers, he had 15 carries for 103 yards and a touchdown to go along with a 15-yard reception during the 31–28 victory.

Murray finished the 2022 season with 171 carries for 760 yards and six touchdowns to go along with 27 receptions for 132 yards in 13 games and seven starts.

=== Buffalo Bills ===
On May 1, 2023, Murray signed a one-year deal with the Bills. At age 33, he became the oldest active running back on an NFL roster that season.

Murray made his Bills debut in the season-opener against the Jets, rushing twice for eight yards and catching a nine-yard reception during the 22–16 overtime road loss. In the next game against the Raiders, Murray had six carries for 22 yards and his first touchdown of the season during the 38–10 victory. The following week against the Commanders, he recorded five carries for 15 yards and a touchdown in the 37–3 road victory.

During a narrow Week 10 24–22 loss to his former team, the Broncos, on Monday Night Football, Murray had nine carries for 68 yards and a touchdown. During Week 15 against the Dallas Cowboys, he recorded five carries for 11 yards and a touchdown in the 31–10 victory.

Murray finished the 2023 season with 79 carries for 300 yards and four touchdowns to go along with 17 receptions for 119 yards in 16 games and four starts. The Bills finished the season atop the AFC East with an 11–6 record and qualified for the playoffs as the #2-seed. During the Wild Card Round against the Steelers, Murray caught two passes for 13 yards in the 31–17 victory. In the Divisional Round against the Chiefs, he had three receptions for 27 yards during the 27–24 loss.

=== Retirement ===
On July 31, 2025, Murray announced his retirement from the NFL.

== Career statistics ==
=== NFL ===
Legend
**Bold**	Career high

==== Regular season ====
Year	Team	Games		Rushing					Receiving					Fumbles	
Year	Team	GP	GS	Att	Yds	Avg	Lng	TD	Rec	Yds	Avg	Lng	TD	Fum	Lost
2013	OAK	0	0	Did not play due to injury											
2014	OAK	15	3	82	424	**5.2**	**90T**	2	17	143	**8.4**	**46**	0	1	0
2015	OAK	**16**	**16**	**266**	**1,066**	4.0	54	6	**41**	232	5.7	23	0	**4**	**1**
2016	OAK	14	12	195	788	4.0	42	**12**	33	**264**	8.0	39	0	2	**1**
2017	MIN	**16**	11	216	842	3.9	46	8	15	103	6.9	28	0	1	0
2018	MIN	**16**	6	140	578	4.1	38T	6	22	141	6.4	16	0	0	0
2019	NO	**16**	8	146	637	4.4	30T	5	34	235	6.9	30	**1**	0	0
2020	NO	15	7	146	656	4.5	36T	4	23	176	7.7	25	**1**	1	0
2021	BAL	14	6	119	501	4.2	46T	6	10	75	7.5	18	0	0	0
2022	NO	1	0	11	57	**5.2**	10	1	1	8	8.0	8	0	0	0
2022	DEN	12	7	160	703	4.4	52	5	26	124	4.8	15	0	1	0
2023	BUF	**16**	4	79	300	3.8	29	4	17	119	7.0	22	0	1	0
Total		151	80	1,560	6,552	4.2	90T	59	239	1,620	6.8	46	2	11	2

==== Postseason ====
Year	Team	Games		Rushing					Receiving					Fumbles	
Year	Team	GP	GS	Att	Yds	Avg	Lng	TD	Rec	Yds	Avg	Lng	TD	Fum	Lost
2016	OAK	1	1	12	39	3.3	**18**	**1**	1	12	**12.0**	12	0	0	0
2017	MIN	**2**	**2**	**25**	**68**	2.7	14	**1**	4	28	7.0	13	0	0	0
2019	NO	1	0	5	21	**4.2**	8	0	1	4	4.0	4	0	0	0
2020	NO	1	1	4	9	2.3	4	0	2	11	5.5	6	**1**	0	0
2023	BUF	**2**	0	0	0	0.0	0	0	**5**	**40**	8.0	**15**	0	0	0
Total		7	4	46	137	3.0	18	2	13	95	7.3	15	1	0	0

=== College ===
Season	Team	Rushing					Receiving				Kick return			
Season	Team	Att	Yds	Avg	Y/G	TD	Rec	Yds	Avg	TD	Ret	Yds	Avg	TD
2008	UCF	46	132	2.9	16.5	3	1	4	4.0	0	0	0	0.0	0
2010	UCF	111	637	5.7	45.5	11	5	47	9.4	1	2	15	7.5	0
2011	UCF	98	549	5.6	45.7	8	17	242	14.2	1	1	69	69.0	1
2012	UCF	198	1,106	5.6	100.5	15	27	231	8.6	4	0	0	0.0	0
Career		453	2,424	5.4	53.8	37	50	524	10.5	6	3	84	28.0	1

== Personal life ==
Murray lives in Florida with his wife and four children. In 2020, he earned an MBA from the Martin J. Whitman School of Management of Syracuse University.

In May 2022, Murray announced that his non-profit foundation will open a multi-use facility in his hometown of Nedrow, New York.
