= 2012 Ball State Cardinals football team =

American college football season

2012 Ball State Cardinals football

Beef 'O' Brady's Bowl, L 17–38 vs. UCF
- Conference: Mid-American Conference
- West Division
- Record: 9–4 (6–2 MAC)
- Head coach: Pete Lembo (2nd season)
- Offensive coordinator: Rich Skrosky (2nd season)
- Offensive scheme: Multiple
- Defensive coordinator: Jay Bateman (2nd season)
- Base defense: 3–4
- Home stadium: Scheumann Stadium

2012 Mid-American Conference football standings
	Conf.			Overall
Team	W		L	W		L
East Division
Kent State x	8	–	0	11	–	3
Bowling Green	6	–	2	8	–	5
Ohio	4	–	4	9	–	4
Buffalo	3	–	5	4	–	8
Miami (OH)	3	–	5	4	–	8
UMass	1	–	7	1	–	11
Akron	0	–	8	1	–	11
West Division
No. 22 Northern Illinois x$	8	–	0	12	–	2
Toledo	6	–	2	9	–	4
Ball State	6	–	2	9	–	4
Central Michigan	4	–	4	7	–	6
Western Michigan	2	–	6	4	–	8
Eastern Michigan	1	–	7	2	–	10
Championship: Northern Illinois 44, Kent State 37
$ – Conference champion and BCS representative as top non-AQ school to meet automatic qualification criteria; x – Division champion/co-champions; UMass not eligible for conference title or bowl game as part of FBS transition; Rankings from AP Poll

The 2012 Ball State Cardinals football team represented Ball State University in the 2012 NCAA Division I FBS football season. They were led by second-year head coach Pete Lembo and played their home games at Scheumann Stadium. They were a member of the West Division of the Mid-American Conference. They finished the season 9–4, 6–2 in MAC play to finish in a tie for second place in the West Division. They were invited to the Beef 'O' Brady's Bowl where they were defeated by UCF. The Cardinals were led by Junior QB #10 Keith Wenning with 3,095 yards passing, 24 touchdown passes and 10 interceptions.

== Schedule ==
Date	Time	Opponent	Site	TV	Result	Attendance
August 30	7:00 p.m.	Eastern Michigan	Scheumann Stadium; Muncie, IN	ESPN3	W 37–26	12,725
September 8	12:30 p.m.	at No. 12 Clemson*	Memorial Stadium; Clemson, SC	ACCN/ESPN3	L 27–52	79,557
September 15	8:00 p.m.	at Indiana*	Memorial Stadium; Bloomington, IN	BTN	W 41–39	48,186
September 22	4:30 p.m.	South Florida*	Scheumann Stadium; Muncie, IN	Big East Network/ESPN3	W 31–27	16,397
September 29	12:00 p.m.	at Kent State	Dix Stadium; Kent, OH	ESPN+/CSS	L 43–45	21,657
October 6	2:00 p.m.	Northern Illinois	Scheumann Stadium; Muncie, IN (Bronze Stalk Trophy)	ESPN3	L 23–35	11,238
October 13	3:00 p.m.	Western Michigan^{†}	Scheumann Stadium; Muncie, IN	ESPN3	W 30–24 ^{OT}	14,192
October 20	3:30 p.m.	at Central Michigan	Kelly/Shorts Stadium; Mount Pleasant, MI	ESPN3	W 41–30	14,081
October 27	12:00 p.m.	at Army*	Michie Stadium; West Point, NY	CBSSN	W 30–22	15,288
November 6	8:00 p.m.	at No. 23 Toledo	Glass Bowl; Toledo, OH	ESPN2	W 34–27	18,211
November 14	8:00 p.m.	Ohio	Scheumann Stadium; Muncie, IN	ESPNU	W 52–27	10,097
November 23	1:00 p.m.	at Miami (OH)	Yager Stadium; Oxford, OH		W 31–24	8,154
December 21	7:30 p.m.	vs. UCF*	Tropicana Field; St. Petersburg, FL (Beef 'O' Brady's Bowl)	ESPN	L 17–38	21,759
*Non-conference game; ^{†}Homecoming; Rankings from AP Poll released prior to the game; All times are in Eastern time

== Game summaries ==
=== Eastern Michigan ===
	1	2	3	4	Total
Eagles	0	13	0	13	26
Cardinals	10	3	21	3	37

=== @ Clemson ===
	1	2	3	4	Total
Cardinals	7	3	10	7	27
#12 Tigers	13	32	0	7	52

=== @ Indiana ===
	1	2	3	4	Total
Cardinals	14	10	14	3	41
Hoosiers	10	15	0	14	39

=== South Florida ===
	1	2	3	4	Total
Bulls	3	6	10	8	27
Cardinals	3	7	14	7	31

=== @ Kent State ===
	1	2	3	4	Total
Cardinals	0	13	13	17	43
Golden Flashes	0	21	14	10	45

=== Northern Illinois ===
	1	2	3	4	Total
Huskies	7	7	7	14	35
Cardinals	3	13	7	0	23

=== Western Michigan ===
	1	2	3	4	OT	Total
Broncos	7	14	0	3	0	24
Cardinals	7	3	7	7	6	30

=== @ Central Michigan ===
	1	2	3	4	Total
Cardinals	7	17	7	10	41
Chippewas	0	10	7	13	30

=== @ Army ===
	1	2	3	4	Total
Cardinals	14	3	3	10	30
Black Knights	7	3	3	9	22

=== @ Toledo ===
	1	2	3	4	Total
Cardinals	14	3	7	10	34
#23 Rockets	7	10	3	7	27

=== Ohio ===
	1	2	3	4	Total
Bobcats	3	14	7	3	27
Cardinals	7	14	10	21	52

=== @ Miami (OH) ===
	1	2	3	4	Total
Cardinals	14	7	10	0	31
RedHawks	7	7	0	10	24

=== UCF–Beef 'O' Brady's Bowl ===
	1	2	3	4	Total
Cardinals	0	7	3	7	17
Knights	13	15	7	3	38
