= Keith R. Tribble =

Keith Tribble
Biographical details
- Born: 1955 (age 70–71); Miami, Florida, U.S.

Playing career
- 1974–1976: Florida
- Position: Offensive guard

Administrative career (AD unless noted)
- 1992–1993: Florida (associate AD)
- 1993–2006: Orange Bowl (CEO)
- 2006–2011: UCF

Accomplishments and honors

Awards
- University of Florida Athletic Hall of Fame

Keith R. Tribble (born 1955) was the president and chief executive officer (CEO) of Jackson Health Foundation (JHF) from 2014 to 2020. Since joining JHF, Tribble and his team secured $22m in charitable contributions.

Prior to joining JHF, Tribble was the executive vice president and director of athletics for the University of Central Florida (UCF) where he spearheaded efforts to secure a $15M deal for the construction and operation of both the 45,000 seat Bright House Networks Stadium and the 10,000 seat UCF Arena. He was also instrumental in increasing charitable contributions to the UCF athletic department from $3.75M to a record $7.3M during his tenure. He resigned from his post as UCF's Athletic Director in 2011.

For 13 years, Tribble was CEO of the Orange Bowl, an annual collegiate football game played at Hard Rock Stadium in Miami. During his tenure, Tribble was charged with raising funds to support Orange Bowl programs and initiatives. The Orange Bowl Committee recognized his work by establishing the Keith Tribble Community Service Excellence Award, which honors a South Florida resident who has made a significant impact in their community.

== Early life and education ==
Tribble was born in Miami, Florida. He attended Miami Killian High School, where he was a high school football player for the Killian Cougars.

Tribble accepted an athletic scholarship to attend the University of Florida in Gainesville, Florida, where he lettered at offensive guard for coach Doug Dickey's Florida Gators football team from 1974 to 1976. During his time as a Gator football player, he played on three bowl teams. Tribble graduated with a Bachelor of Arts degree in journalism in 1977 and was inducted into the University of Florida Athletic Hall of Fame as a "Distinguished Letter Winner" in 2011. Tribble graduated with a Bachelor of Arts degree in journalism in 1977, and was inducted into the University of Florida Athletic Hall of Fame as a "Distinguished Letterwinner" in 2011.

== Athletic administrator ==
Tribble was an associate athletic director at the University of Florida from 1992 to 1993. He became the chief executive officer of the Orange Bowl Committee in 1993, and held that position for thirteen years, including the negotiation of the Bowl Alliance and Bowl Championship Series (BCS) agreements.

In June 2006, he was hired as the athletic director of the UCF Knights. At the time he was hired by the University of Central Florida, Tribble was one of nine African-American athletic directors among the 120 major college athletic programs in the Division I/Football Bowl Subdivision (FBS) of the National Collegiate Athletic Association (NCAA). He was also the executive vice president of the University of Central Florida Athletics Association, the private non-profit corporation that is responsible for the administration and financial management of the UCF Knights athletic programs. As UCF's director of athletics, Tribble oversaw $150 million in improvements to the Knights' athletics facilities, with another $70 million in construction approved and pending.

== Personal ==
Tribble is married and has two children.

== See also ==
- List of University of Florida alumni
