= NCAA Division I FBS total offense leaders =

College American football records

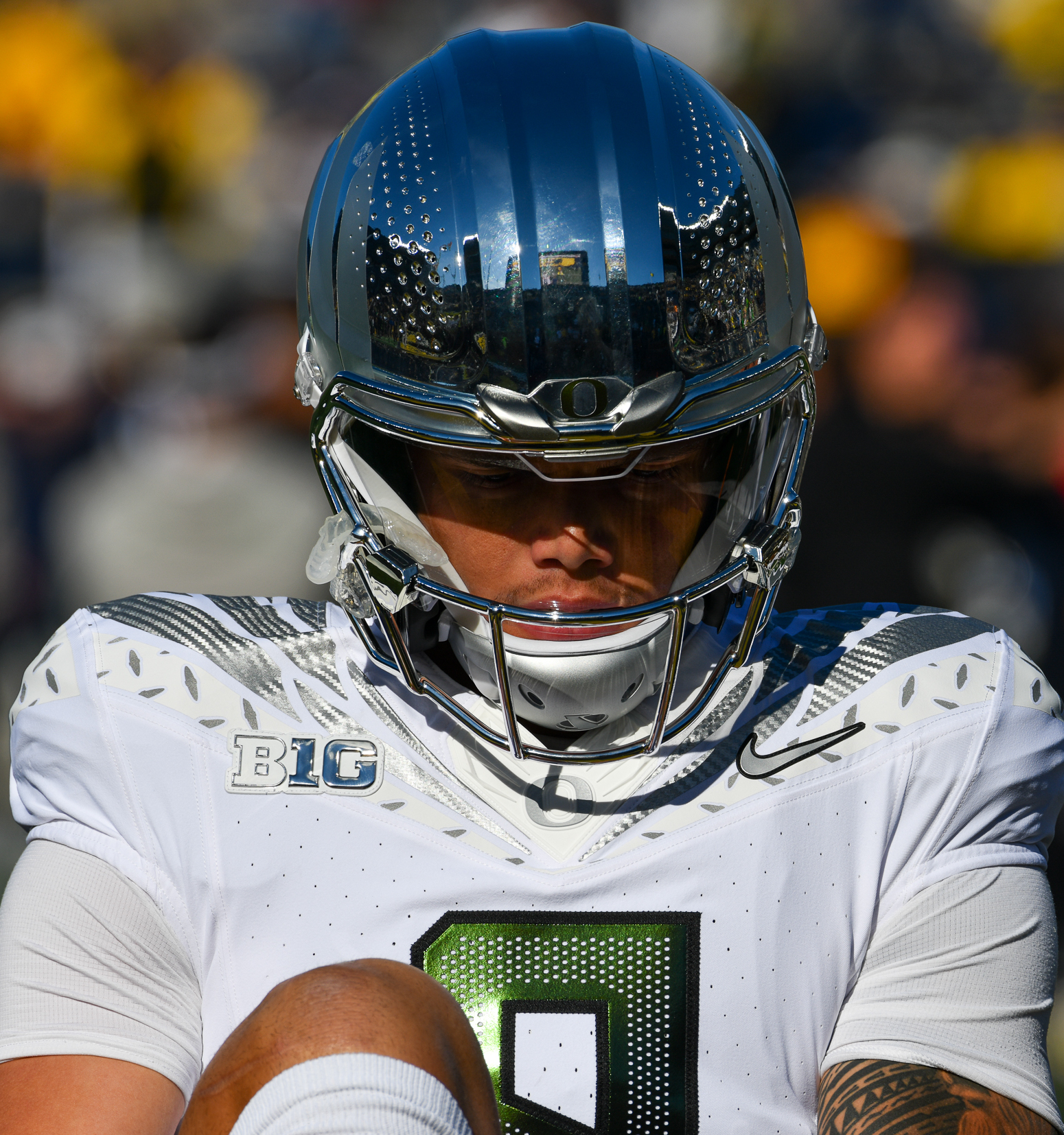
Dillon Gabriel is the career record holder in total touchdowns.

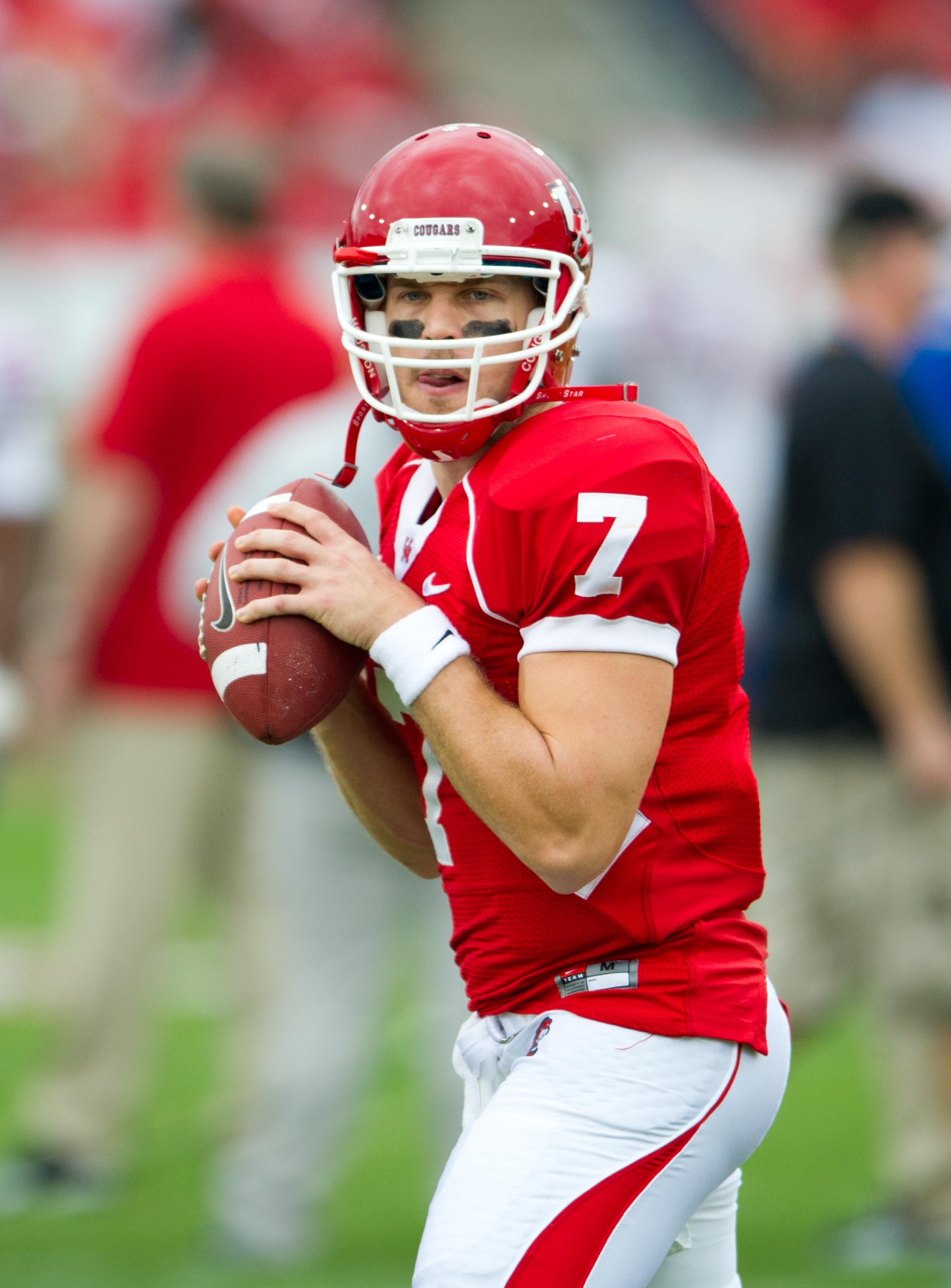
Case Keenum is the career record holder in total offense.

The NCAA Division I FBS total offense leaders are career, single-season, and single-game leaders in total offense yards and touchdown responsibility. Both of these statistics are defined as the sum of passing and rushing yards or touchdowns, and do not include any receiving or returns stats. These lists are dominated by more recent players for several reasons:

- Since 1955, seasons have increased from 10 games to 11 and then 12 games in length.
- The NCAA didn't allow freshmen to play varsity football until 1972 (with the exception of the World War II years), allowing players to have four-year careers.
- Bowl games only began counting toward single-season and career statistics in 2002. This affects players such as Ty Detmer, though the vast majority of players on this list played after 2002 anyway.
- In recent decades, starting with the Southeastern Conference in 1992, FBS conferences have introduced their own championship games, which have always counted fully toward single-season and career statistics.
- The NCAA ruled that the 2020 season, heavily disrupted by COVID-19, would not count against the athletic eligibility of any football player. This gave every player active in that season the opportunity for five years of eligibility instead of the normal four.
- Since 2018, players have been allowed to participate in as many as four games in a redshirt season; previously, playing in even one game "burned" the redshirt. Since 2024, postseason games have not counted against the four-game limit. These changes to redshirt rules have given very recent players several extra games to accumulate statistics.
- Only seasons in which a team was considered to be a part of the Football Bowl Subdivision are included in these lists. Players such as Taylor Heinicke and Chad Pennington played for teams who reclassified to the FBS during their careers, and only their stats from the FBS years are eligible for inclusion.

Legend
Active FBS Player

Statistics accurate as of January 20, 2026.

== Total offense yards ==
The career leader in total offense yards is Houston's Case Keenum. Keenum was granted a fifth year of eligibility after being injured in Houston's third game in 2010 but he would still top the list by nearly 2,500 yards if 2010 were not included. The second player on the list, Hawaii's Timmy Chang, also had a fifth season after being granted a medical redshirt after being injured in 2001. Chang broke the record previously held by BYU's Ty Detmer, who is the only player in the top 30 whose entire college career was in the 20th century. Two other players in the top 30, Chang and Philip Rivers of NC State, played their first college seasons in 2000, which depending on definitions is part of either the 20th or 21st century.

The single-season leader in passing yards is Joe Burrow, who is the only player to ever top 6,000 yards of total offense in a single season. Burrow's yards came in 15 games, while second place Bailey Zappe's yards came in 14 games, and third place B. J. Symons's yards came in just 13 games. Symons held the single-season record for 16 years after breaking the record previously set by Houston's David Klingler in 1990.

The single-game record belongs to Patrick Mahomes, whose 819 yards came in a 2016 loss.

While these lists have many of the same players as the passing leaders list, the player with the most career yards without appearing on the passing yards list is Nevada's Colin Kaepernick, whose 4,112 rushing yards gets him on the list, even as his 10,098 career passing yards ranks outside the top 100. Similarly, Louisville's Lamar Jackson's 2017 season ranks outside the top 100 in passing yards, but his 1,601 rushing yards bring him into the list. Although players of any position are eligible for inclusion, all players on all three lists are quarterbacks, as the rushing leaders on the career, single-season, and single-game lists of 6,405, 2,628, and 427 yards respectively, are significantly below the 30th ranked players on the lists below.

=== Career ===
#	Player	Yards	Passing	Rushing	Seasons
1	Case Keenum	20,114	19,217	897	2007 2008 2009 2010 2011 Houston
2	Dillon Gabriel	19,931	18,722	1,209	2019 2020 2021 UCF ᛫ 2022 2023 Oklahoma ᛫ 2024 Oregon
3	Bo Nix	16,964	15,351	1,613	2019 2020 2021 Auburn ᛫ 2022 2023 Oregon
4	Timmy Chang	16,910	17,072	-162	2000 2001 2002 2003 2004 Hawaii
5	Sam Hartman	16,634	15,656	978	2018 2019 2020 2021 2022 Wake Forest ᛫ 2023 Notre Dame
6	Landry Jones	16,271	16,646	-375	2009 2010 2011 2012 Oklahoma
7	Jayden Daniels	16,056	12,749	3,307	2019 2020 2021 Arizona State ᛫ 2022 2023 LSU
8	Dan LeFevour	15,853	12,905	2,948	2006 2007 2008 2009 Central Michigan
9	Baker Mayfield	15,690	14,607	1,083	2013 Texas Tech ᛫ 2015 2016 2017 Oklahoma
10	Graham Harrell	15,611	15,793	-182	2005 2006 2007 2008 Texas Tech
11	Holton Ahlers	15,373	13,927	1,446	2018 2019 2020 2021 2022 East Carolina
12	Seth Henigan	15,164	14,266	898	2021 2022 2023 2024 Memphis
13	Rakeem Cato	14,918	14,079	839	2011 2012 2013 2014 Marshall
14	Colt McCoy	14,824	13,253	1,571	2006 2007 2008 2009 Texas
15	Colt Brennan	14,740	14,193	547	2005 2006 2007 Hawaii

#	Player	Yards	Passing	Rushing	Seasons
16	Ty Detmer	14,665	15,031	-366	1988 1989 1990 1991 BYU
17	Kellen Moore	14,534	14,667	-133	2008 2009 2010 2011 Boise State
18	Will Rogers	14,378	14,773	-395	2020 2021 2022 2023 Mississippi State ᛫ 2024 Washington
19	Colin Kaepernick	14,210	10,098	4,112	2007 2008 2009 2010 Nevada
20	Luke Falk	14,086	14,486	-400	2014 2015 2016 2017 Washington State
21	Frank Harris	14,007	11,862	2,145	2019 2020 2021 2022 2023 UTSA
22	Michael Penix Jr.	14,006	13,741	265	2018 2019 2020 2021 Indiana ᛫ 2022 2023 Washington
23	Chevan Cordeiro	13,811	12,191	1,620	2018 2019 2020 2021 Hawaii ᛫ 2022 2023 San Jose State
24	Kevin Kolb	13,715	12,964	751	2003 2004 2005 2006 Houston
25	Mason Rudolph	13,646	13,618	28	2014 2015 2016 2017 Oklahoma State
26	Philip Rivers	13,580	13,484	96	2000 2001 2002 2003 NC State
27	Aaron Murray	13,562	13,166	396	2010 2011 2012 2013 Georgia
28	Jaxson Dart	13,511	11,970	1,541	2021 USC ᛫ 2022 2023 2024 Ole Miss
29	Chase Daniel	13,485	12,515	970	2005 2006 2007 2008 Missouri
30	Brett Rypien	13,484	13,581	-97	2015 2016 2017 2018 Boise State

=== Single season ===
#	Player	Yards	Passing	Rushing	Season
1	Joe Burrow	6,039	5,671	368	2019 LSU
2	Bailey Zappe	5,984	5,967	17	2021 Western Kentucky
3	B. J. Symons	5,976	5,833	143	2003 Texas Tech
4	Colt Brennan	5,915	5,549	366	2006 Hawaii
5	Case Keenum	5,829	5,671	158	2009 Houston
6	Case Keenum	5,666	5,631	35	2011 Houston
7	Graham Harrell	5,614	5,705	-91	2007 Texas Tech
8	Anthony Gordon	5,559	5,579	-20	2019 Washington State
9	Kyler Murray	5,362	4,361	1,001	2018 Oklahoma
10	Patrick Mahomes	5,312	5,052	260	2016 Texas Tech
11	Lamar Jackson	5,261	3,660	1,601	2017 Louisville
12	Case Keenum	5,241	5,020	221	2008 Houston
13	Marcus Mariota	5,224	4,454	770	2014 Oregon
14	Deshaun Watson	5,222	4,593	629	2016 Clemson
15	David Klingler	5,221	5,140	81	1990 Houston

#	Player	Yards	Passing	Rushing	Season
16	Deshaun Watson	5,209	4,104	1,105	2015 Clemson
17	Derek Carr	5,200	5,083	117	2013 Fresno State
18	Paul Smith	5,184	5,065	119	2007 Tulsa
19	Jalen Hurts	5,149	3,851	1,298	2019 Oklahoma
20	Bryant Moniz	5,142	5,040	102	2010 Hawaii
21	Johnny Manziel	5,116	3,706	1,410	2012 Texas A&M
22	Lamar Jackson	5,114	3,543	1,571	2016 Louisville
23	Patrick Mahomes	5,109	4,653	456	2016 Texas Tech
24	Matt Johnson	5,105	4,946	159	2015 Bowling Green
25	Graham Harrell	5,096	5,111	-15	2008 Texas Tech
26	Ty Detmer	5,022	5,188	-106	1990 BYU
27	Drake Maye	5,019	4,321	698	2022 North Carolina
28	Robert Griffin III	4,992	4,293	699	2011 Baylor
29	Austin Reed	4,970	4,746	224	2022 Western Kentucky
30	Jordan Lynch	4,953	3,138	1,815	2012 Northern Illinois

=== Single game ===
#	Player	Yards	Passing	Rushing	Date / Team
1	Patrick Mahomes	819	734	85	Oct. 22, 2016 Texas Tech
2	Connor Halliday	751	734	17	Oct. 4, 2014 Washington State
3	David Klingler	732	716	16	Dec. 2, 1990 Houston
4	Matt Vogler	696	690	6	Nov. 3, 1990 TCU
5	Geno Smith	687	656	31	Sep. 29, 2012 West Virginia
6	B. J. Symons	681	661	20	Sep. 27, 2003 Texas Tech
7	Brian Lindgren	657	637	20	Oct. 6, 2001 Idaho
8	Dillon Gabriel	650	601	49	Oct. 17, 2020 UCF
9	Graham Harrell	643	646	-3	Sep. 22, 2008 Texas Tech
10	Brett Smith	640	498	142	Nov. 23, 2013 Wyoming
11	Clayton Tune	638	527	111	Nov. 5, 2022 Houston
12	Garrett Gilbert	635	538	97	Oct. 26, 2013 SMU
13	Scott Mitchell	625	631	-6	Oct. 15, 1988 Utah
13	David Klingler	625	563	62	Nov. 3, 1990 Houston
13	Patrick Mahomes	625	598	27	Nov. 29, 2014 Texas Tech

#	Player	Yards	Passing	Rushing	Date / Team
16	Zac Dysert	624	516	108	Sep. 29, 2012 Miami (OH)
17	B. J. Symons	618	586	32	Sep. 20, 2003 Texas Tech
18	Jimmy Klingler	612	613	-1	Nov. 28, 1992 Houston
19	Lamar Jackson	610	411	199	Sep. 9, 2016 Louisville
19	Drew Anderson	610	597	13	Oct. 7, 2017 Buffalo
21	Jayden Daniels	606	372	234	Nov. 11, 2023 LSU
22	Quinton Flowers	605	503	102	Nov. 24, 2017 South Florida
23	Cody Hodges	604	643	-39	Oct. 15, 2005 Texas Tech
23	Nick Mullens	604	591	13	Oct. 1, 2016 Southern Miss
25	Ty Detmer	603	599	4	Nov. 16, 1991 BYU
26	Alan Bowman	602	605	-3	Sep. 15, 2018 Texas Tech
27	Troy Kopp	601	564	37	Oct. 20, 1990 Pacific
27	Chase Clement	601	541	60	Nov. 24, 2007 Rice
27	Drew Mestemaker	601	608	-7	Oct. 24, 2025 North Texas
30	Virgil Carter	599	513	86	Nov. 5, 1966 BYU

== Touchdowns responsible for ==
In the 2024 season, Dillon Gabriel broke Keenum's total touchdowns record. The single-season record is shared by Burrow and Zappe, and Klingler holds the single game record with 11.

Similar to the yards list, every player in the career and single-season list is a quarterback. However, the single-game list does include two running backs, Howard Griffith and Jaret Patterson, who each had games with 8 rushing touchdowns.

=== Career ===
#	Player	TD	Pass	Rush	Rec	Seasons
1	Dillon Gabriel	189	155	33	1	2019 2020 2021 UCF ᛫ 2022 2023 Oklahoma ᛫ 2024 Oregon
2	Case Keenum	178	155	23		2007 2008 2009 2010 2011 Houston
3	Sam Hartman	154	134	20		2018 2019 2020 2021 2022 Wake Forest ᛫ 2023 Notre Dame
4	Baker Mayfield	153	131	21	1	2013 Texas Tech ᛫ 2015 2016 2017 Oklahoma
5	Bo Nix	152	113	38	1	2019 2020 2021 Auburn ᛫ 2022 2023 Oregon
6	Dan LeFevour	150	102	47	1	2006 2007 2008 2009 Central Michigan
7	J. T. Barrett	147	104	43		2014 2015 2016 2017 Ohio State
8	Colt Brennan	146	131	15		2005 2006 2007 Hawaii
8	Graham Harrell	146	134	12		2005 2006 2007 2008 Texas Tech
8	Kellen Moore	146	142	3	1	2008 2009 2010 2011 Boise State
8	Rakeem Cato	146	131	15		2011 2012 2013 2014 Marshall
12	Tim Tebow	145	88	57		2006 2007 2008 2009 Florida
13	Colin Kaepernick	142	82	59	1	2007 2008 2009 2010 Nevada
14	Aaron Murray	137	121	16		2010 2011 2012 2013 Georgia
15	Marcus Mariota	136	105	29	2	2012 2013 2014 Oregon

#	Player	TD	Pass	Rush	Rec	Seasons
16	Ty Detmer	135	121	14		1988 1989 1990 1991 BYU
17	Russell Wilson	133	109	23	1	2008 2009 2010 NC State ᛫ 2011 Wisconsin
17	Tajh Boyd	133	107	26		2010 2011 2012 2013 Clemson
19	Colt McCoy	132	112	20		2006 2007 2008 2009 Texas
20	Sam Ehlinger	127	94	33		2017 2018 2019 2020 Texas
21	Landry Jones	126	123	3		2009 2010 2011 2012 Oklahoma
22	Chase Clement	125	99	25	1	2005 2006 2007 2008 Rice
23	Jalen Hurts	124	80	43	1	2016 2017 2018 Alabama ᛫ 2019 Oklahoma
23	Jayden Daniels	124	89	34	1	2019 2020 2021 Arizona State ᛫ 2022 2023 LSU
25	Timmy Chang	123	117	6		2000 2001 2002 2003 2004 Hawaii
25	Luke Falk	123	119	4		2014 2015 2016 2017 Washington State
25	Holton Ahlers	123	97	25	1	2018 2019 2020 2021 2022 East Carolina
28	Danny Wuerffel	122	114	8		1993 1994 1995 1996 Florida
28	Matt Barkley	122	116	6		2009 2010 2011 2012 USC
30	Frank Harris	121	92	28	1	2019 2020 2021 2022 2023 UTSA

=== Single season ===
#	Player	TD	Pass	Rush	Rec	Season
1	Joe Burrow	65	60	5		2019 LSU
1	Bailey Zappe	65	62	3		2021 Western Kentucky
3	Colt Brennan	63	58	5		2006 Hawaii
4	Paul Smith	60	47	13		2007 Tulsa
5	Marcus Mariota	58	42	15	1	2014 Oregon
6	B. J. Symons	57	52	5		2003 Texas Tech
6	Chase Clement	57	44	12	1	2008 Rice
8	David Klingler	55	54	1		1990 Houston
8	Tim Tebow	55	32	23		2007 Florida
8	Sam Bradford	55	50	5		2008 Oklahoma
11	Dwayne Haskins	54	50	4		2018 Ohio State
11	Kyler Murray	54	42	12		2018 Oklahoma
13	Jim McMahon	53	47	6		1980 BYU
13	Patrick Mahomes	53	41	12		2016 Texas Tech
13	Jalen Hurts	53	32	20	1	2019 Oklahoma

#	Player	TD	Pass	Rush	Rec	Season
16	Graham Harrell	52	48	4		2007 Texas Tech
16	Derek Carr	52	50	2		2013 Fresno State
16	Caleb Williams	52	42	10		2022 USC
19	Graham Harrell	51	45	6		2008 Texas Tech
19	Case Keenum	51	44	7		2008 Houston
19	Cam Newton	51	30	20	1	2010 Auburn
19	Case Keenum	51	48	3		2011 Houston
19	Brandon Doughty	51	49	2		2014 Western Kentucky
19	Lamar Jackson	51	30	21		2016 Louisville
19	Justin Fields	51	41	10		2019 Ohio State
19	Bo Nix	51	45	6		2023 Oregon
27	Matt Johnson	50	46	4		2015 Bowling Green
27	Brandon Doughty	50	48	1	1	2015 Western Kentucky
27	Deshaun Watson	50	41	9		2016 Clemson
27	D'Eriq King	50	36	14		2018 Houston
27	Sam Hartman	50	39	11		2021 Wake Forest
27	Bryce Young	50	47	3		2021 Alabama
27	Jayden Daniels	50	40	10		2023 LSU

=== Single game ===
#	Player	TDs	P	R	Date	School
1	David Klingler	11	11	-	Nov. 17, 1990	Houston
2	Tanner Mordecai	10	9	1	Nov. 5, 2022	SMU
3	Dennis Shaw	9	9	-	Nov. 15, 1969	San Diego State
3	David Klingler	9	9	-	Aug. 31, 1991	Houston
3	Case Keenum	9	9	-	Oct. 27, 2011	Houston
3	Anthony Gordon	9	9	-	Sep. 21, 2019	Washington State
7	Jason Martin	8	8	-	Oct. 19, 1996	Louisiana Tech
7	Pat Barnes	8	8	-	Nov. 2, 1996	California
7	Howard Griffith	8	-	8	Sep. 22, 1990	Illinois
7	Nick Rolovich	8	8	-	Dec. 8, 2001	Hawaii
7	B. J. Symons	8	8	-	Oct. 4, 2003	Texas Tech
7	Chase Clement	8	6	2	Nov. 3, 2007	Rice
7	Giovanni Vizza	8	8	-	Nov. 10, 2007	North Texas
7	Alex Carder	8	7	1	Nov. 8, 2011	Western Michigan
7	Geno Smith	8	8	-	Sep. 29, 2012	West Virginia
7	Tajh Boyd	8	5	3	Nov. 17, 2012	Clemson
7	Keenan Reynolds	8	1	7	Nov. 22, 2013	Navy
7	Brett Smith	8	7	1	Nov. 23, 2013	Wyoming
7	Brandon Doughty	8	8	-	Nov. 28, 2014	Western Kentucky
7	Lamar Jackson	8	6	2	Sep. 1, 2016	Louisville
7	Jake Browning	8	6	2	Oct. 8, 2016	Washington
7	Drew Anderson	8	7	1	Oct. 7, 2017	Buffalo
7	Joe Burrow	8	7	1	Dec. 28, 2019	LSU
7	Jaret Patterson	8	-	8	Nov. 28, 2020	Buffalo
7	Clayton Tune	8	7	1	Nov. 5, 2022	Houston
7	Dillon Gabriel	8	5	3	Nov. 11, 2023	Oklahoma
7	Jayden Daniels	8	6	2	Nov. 18, 2023	LSU
28	7 – many times					
