= Conference USA football individual awards =

American college football awards

The Conference USA currently gives seven individual football awards at the conclusion of every season. The seven awards are Most Valuable Player, Offensive Player of the Year, Defensive Player of the Year, Special Teams Player of the Year, Newcomer of the Year, Freshman of the Year, and Coach of the Year. Recipients are selected by the votes of the conference's head coaches.

== Player of the Year ==
Positions key
| QB | Quarterback | RB | Running back | WR | Wide receiver | RS | Return specialist |
Class key
| Fr | Freshman | So | Sophomore | Jr | Junior | Sr | Senior |

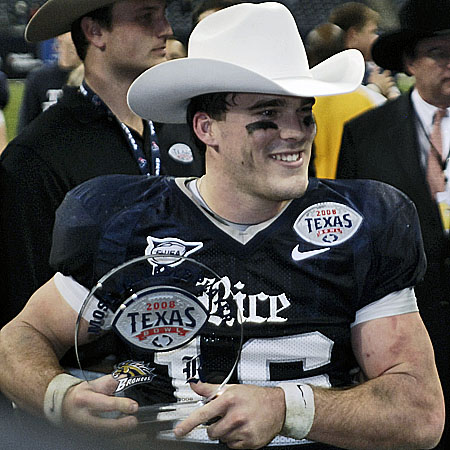
Chase Clement was the first player named Conference USA Player of the Year. He won the award after passing for 4,119 yards and 44 touchdowns during his senior season.

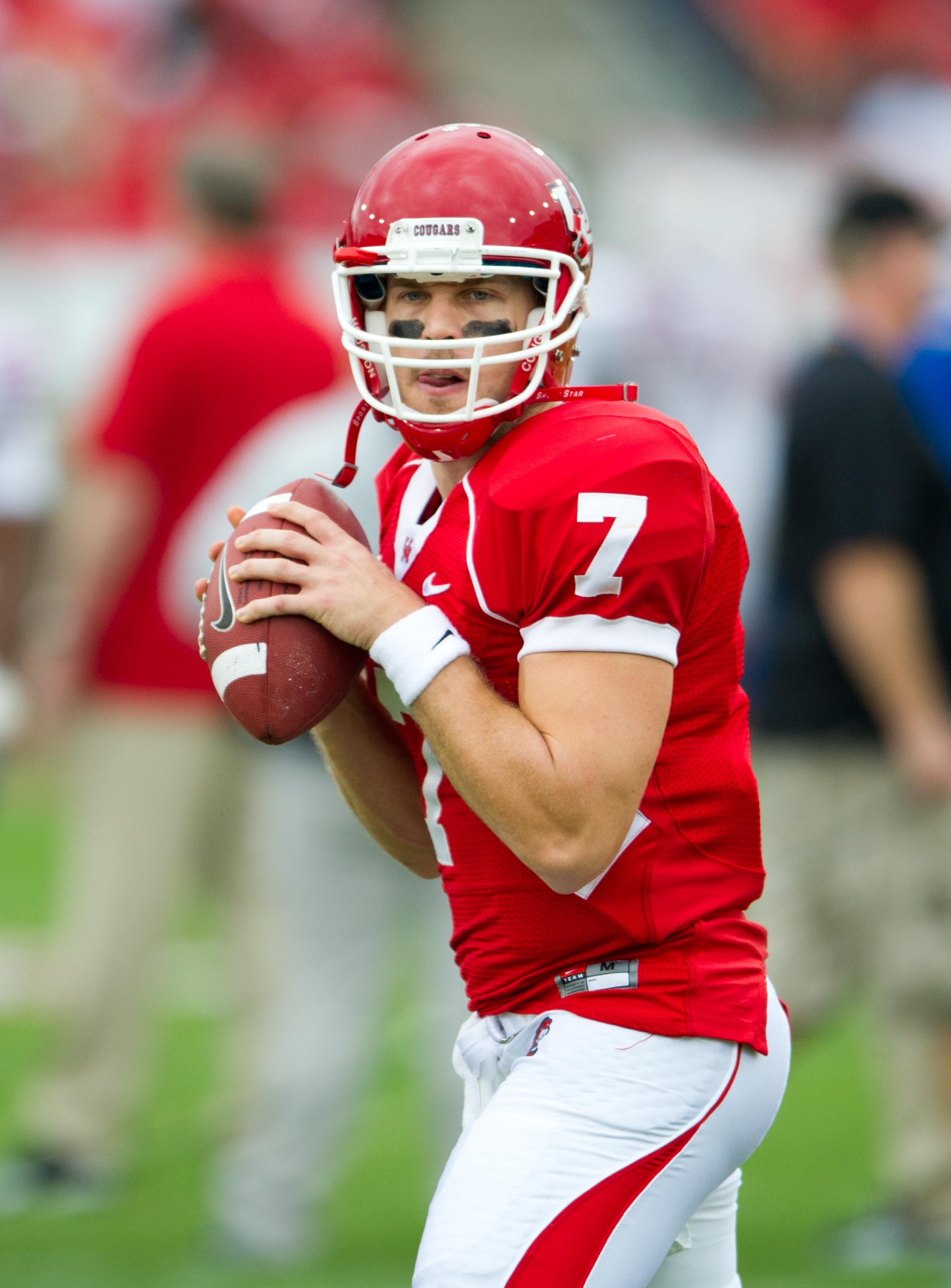
Case Keenum was the first player to be named Conference USA Player of the Year multiple times. He also was named CUSA Offensive Player of the Year and Freshman of the Year during his time at the University of Houston. After graduating he would go on to play in the NFL, and would go on to start in the 2018 NFC Championship game.

=== Winners ===
| Season | Player | School | Position | Class |
|---|---|---|---|---|
| 2008 | Chase Clement | Rice | QB | Sr |
| 2009 | Case Keenum | Houston | QB | Jr |
| 2010 | Dwayne Harris | East Carolina | WR/RS | Sr |
| 2011 | Case Keenum (2) | Houston | QB | Sr |
| 2012 | Rakeem Cato | Marshall | QB | So |
| 2013 | Shane Carden | East Carolina | QB | Jr |
| 2014 | Brandon Doughty | Western Kentucky | QB | Jr |
| 2015 | Brandon Doughty (2) | Western Kentucky | QB | Sr |
| 2016 | Ryan Higgins | Louisiana Tech | QB | Sr |
| 2017 | Devin Singletary | Florida Atlantic | RB | So |
| 2018 | Brent Stockstill | Middle Tennessee State | QB | Sr |
| 2019 | Brenden Knox | Marshall | RB | So |
| 2020 | Jaelon Darden | North Texas | WR/RS | Sr |
| 2021 | Bailey Zappe | Western Kentucky | QB | Sr |
| 2022 | Frank Harris | UTSA | QB | Sr |
| 2023 | Kaidon Salter | Liberty | QB | So |
| 2024 | Tyler Huff | Jacksonville State | QB | Sr |
| 2025 | Cam Cook | Jacksonville State | RB | Jr |

=== Winners by school ===
| School (Seasons) | Winners | Years |
|---|---|---|
| Western Kentucky (2014–present) | 3 | 2014, 2015, 2021 |
| East Carolina (1997–2014) | 2 | 2010, 2013 |
| Houston (1996–2013) | 2 | 2009, 2011 |
| Jacksonville State (2023–present) | 2 | 2024, 2025 |
| Marshall (2005–2022) | 2 | 2012, 2019 |
| Florida Atlantic (2013–2023) | 1 | 2017 |
| Liberty (2023–present) | 1 | 2023 |
| Louisiana Tech (2013–present) | 1 | 2016 |
| Middle Tennessee State (2013–present) | 1 | 2018 |
| North Texas (2013–2023) | 1 | 2020 |
| Rice (2005–2023) | 1 | 2008 |
| UTSA (2013–2023) | 1 | 2022 |

== Offensive Player of the Year ==
The Offensive Player of the Year is awarded to the player voted most outstanding at an offensive position.

=== Winners ===
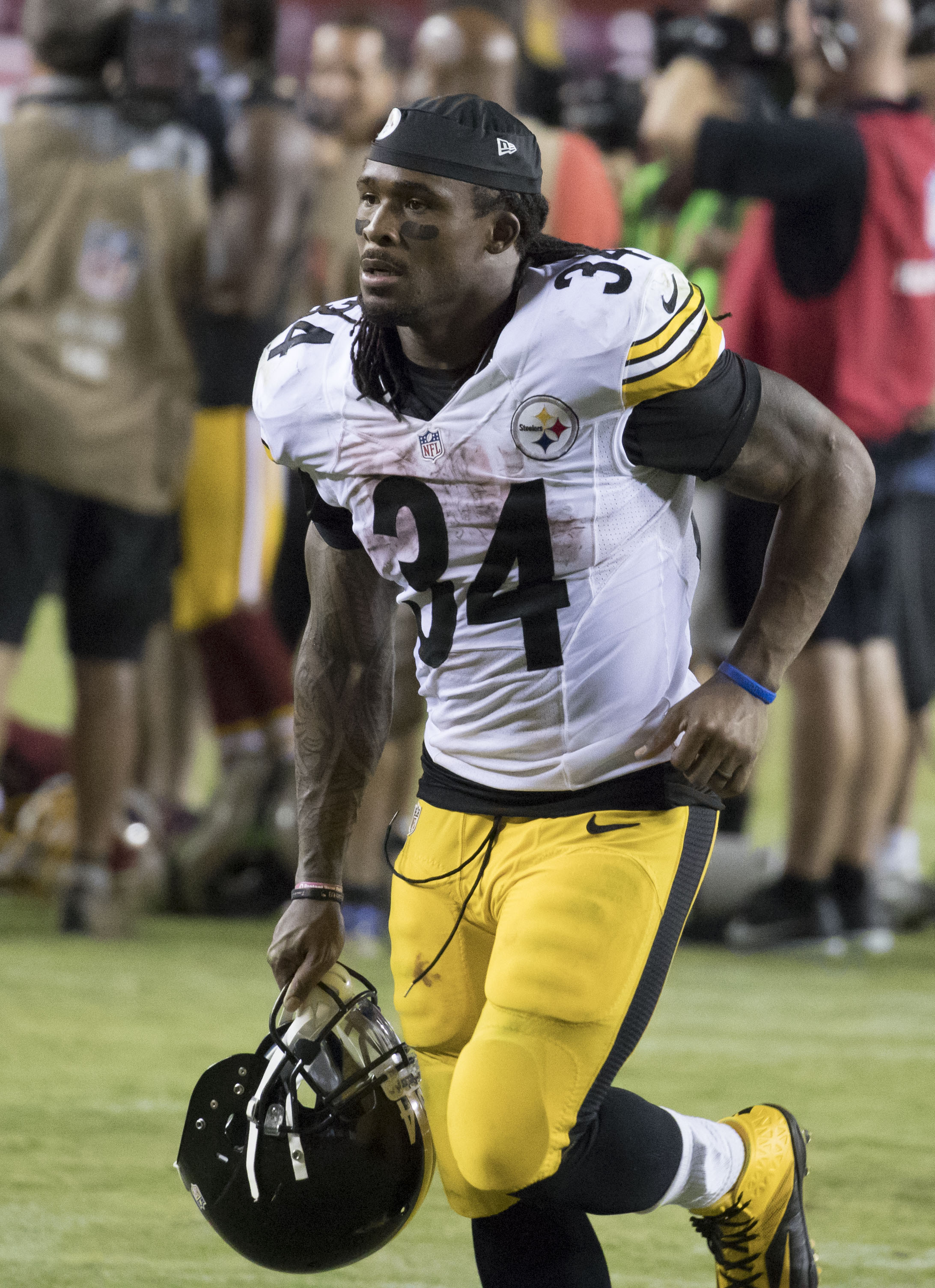
DeAngelo Williams was the second player to win the Conference USA Offensive Player of the Year three times. He has been named to the College Football Hall of Fame, and his number was retired by Memphis. He enjoyed an 11 year NFL career before becoming a professional wrestler.

Positions key
| QB | Quarterback | RB | Running back | TE | Tight end | WR | Wide receiver |
Class key
| Fr | Freshman | So | Sophomore | Jr | Junior | Sr | Senior |

| Season | Player | School | Position | Class |
|---|---|---|---|---|
| 1996 | Antowain Smith | Houston | RB | Sr |
| 1997 | Shaun King | Tulane | QB | Jr |
| 1998 | Chris Redman | Louisville | QB | Jr |
| 1999 | Chris Redman (2) | Louisville | QB | Sr |
| 2000 | Dave Ragone | Louisville | QB | So |
| 2001 | Dave Ragone (2) | Louisville | QB | Jr |
| 2002 | Dave Ragone (3) | Louisville | QB | Sr |
| 2003 | DeAngelo Williams | Memphis | RB | So |
| 2004 | DeAngelo Williams (2) | Memphis | RB | Jr |
| 2004 | Stefan Lefors | Louisville | QB | Sr |
| 2005 | DeAngelo Williams (3) | Memphis | RB | Sr |
| 2006 | Kevin Kolb | Houston | QB | Sr |
| 2007 | Paul Smith | Tulsa | QB | Sr |
| 2008 | Case Keenum | Houston | QB | So |
| 2009 | Joe Webb | UAB | QB | Sr |
| 2010 | G.J. Kinne | Tulsa | QB | Jr |
| 2011 | Patrick Edwards | Houston | WR | Sr |
| 2012 | Zach Line | SMU | RB | Sr |
| 2013 | Rakeem Cato | Marshall | QB | Jr |
| 2014 | Rakeem Cato (2) | Marshall | QB | Sr |
| 2015 | Nick Mullens | Southern Miss | QB | Jr |
| 2016 | Carlos Henderson | Louisiana Tech | WR | Jr |
| 2017 | Mason Fine | North Texas | QB | So |
| 2018 | Mason Fine (2) | North Texas | QB | Jr |
| 2019 | J'mar Smith | Louisiana Tech | QB | Sr |
| 2020 | Sincere McCormick | UTSA | RB | So |
| 2021 | Sincere McCormick (2) | UTSA | RB | Jr |
| 2022 | DeWayne McBride | UAB | RB | Jr |
| 2023 | Diego Pavia | New Mexico State | QB | Sr |
| 2024 | Caden Veltkamp | Western Kentucky | QB | So |
| 2025 | Kejon Owens | FIU | RB | Sr |

=== Winners by school ===
| School (Seasons) | Winners | Years |
|---|---|---|
| Louisville (1996–2005) | 6 | 1998, 1999, 2000, 2001, 2002, 2004 |
| Houston (1996–2013) | 4 | 1996, 2006, 2008, 2011 |
| Memphis (1996–2013) | 3 | 2003, 2004, 2005 |
| Louisiana Tech (2013–present) | 2 | 2016, 2019 |
| Marshall (2005–2022) | 2 | 2013, 2014 |
| North Texas (2013–2023) | 2 | 2017, 2018 |
| Tulsa (2005–2014) | 2 | 2007, 2010 |
| UAB (1999–2015, 2017–2023) | 2 | 2009, 2022 |
| UTSA (2013–2023) | 2 | 2020, 2021 |
| FIU (2013–present) | 1 | 2025 |
| New Mexico State (2023–present) | 1 | 2023 |
| SMU (2005–2013) | 1 | 2012 |
| Southern Miss (1996–2022) | 1 | 2015 |
| Tulane (1996–2014) | 1 | 1997 |
| Western Kentucky (2014–present) | 1 | 2024 |

== Defensive Player of the Year ==
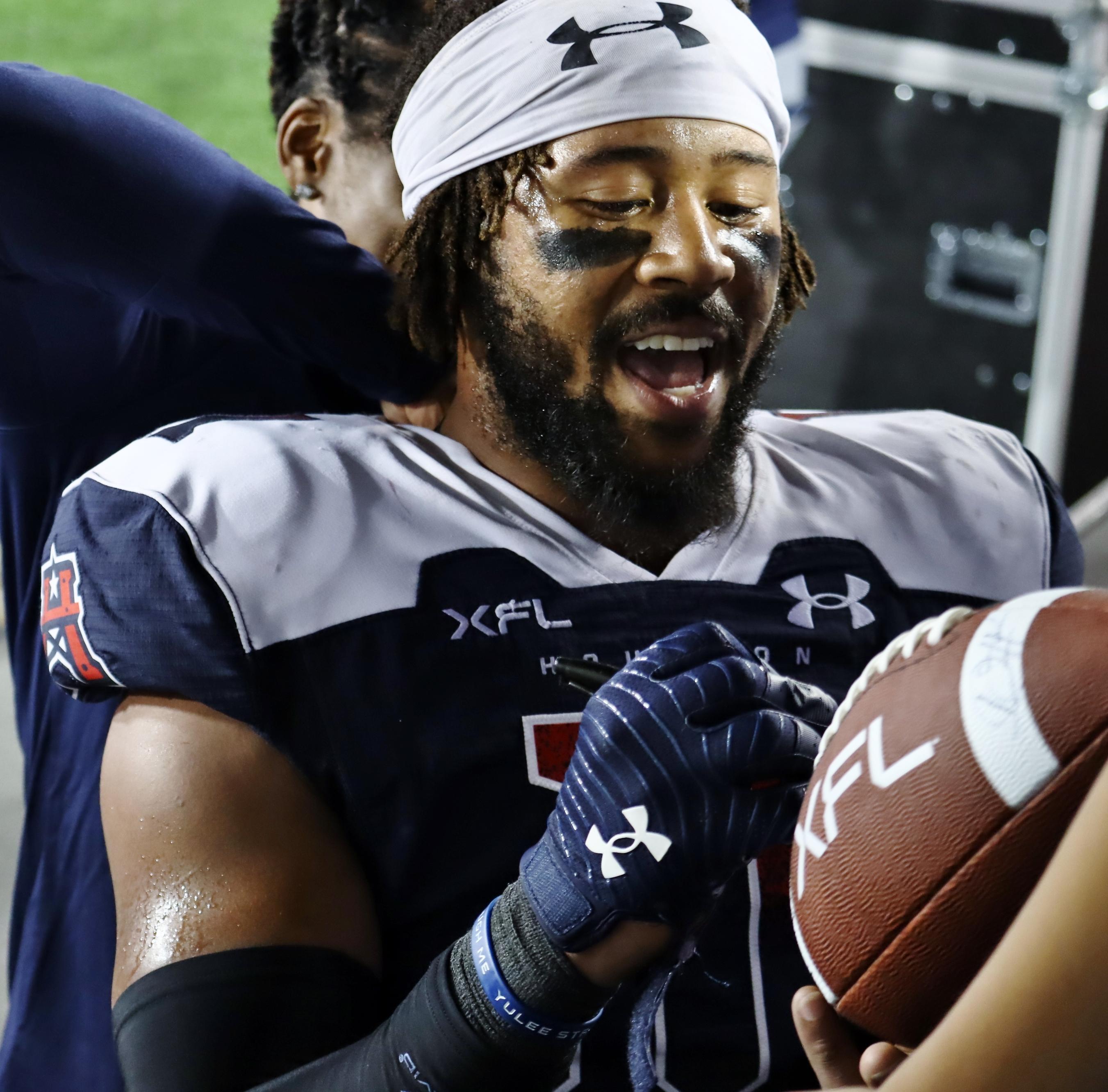
Tavante Beckett was named the 2020 Defensive Player of the Year. After college, he signed with the Detroit Lions as an undrafted free agent.

The Defensive Player of the Year is awarded to the player voted most outstanding at a defensive position.

=== Winners ===
Positions key
| DE | Defensive end | DT | Defensive tackle | LB | Linebacker | DB | Defensive back |
Class key
| Fr | Freshman | So | Sophomore | Jr | Junior | Sr | Senior |

| Season | Player | School | Position | Class |
|---|---|---|---|---|
| 1996 | Tyrus McCloud | Louisville | LB | Sr |
| 1997 | Patrick Surtain | Southern Miss | DB` | Sr |
| 1998 | Adalius Thomas | Southern Miss | DE | Jr |
| 1999 | Adalius Thomas (2) | Southern Miss | DE | Sr |
| 2000 | Cedric Scott | Southern Miss | DE | Sr |
| 2000 | Wayne Rogers | Houston | LB | Sr |
| 2001 | Dewayne White | Louisville | DE | So |
| 2002 | Lamarcus McDonald | TCU | LB | Jr |
| 2003 | Rod Davis | Southern Miss | LB | Jr |
| 2004 | Michael Boley | Southern Miss | LB | Sr |
| 2005 | Kevis Coley | Southern Miss | LB | Sr |
| 2006 | Albert McClellan | Marshall | DL | So |
| 2006 | Nick Bunting | Tulsa | LB | Sr |
| 2007 | Gerald McRath | Southern Miss | LB | So |
| 2008 | Phillip Hunt | Houston | DL | Sr |
| 2009 | Bruce Miller | UCF | DE | Jr |
| 2010 | Bruce Miller (2) | UCF | DE | Sr |
| 2011 | Vinny Curry | Marshall | DE | Sr |
| 2012 | Kemal Ishmael | UCF | DB | Sr |
| 2013 | Shawn Jackson | Tulsa | LB | Sr |
| 2014 | Neville Hewitt | Marshall | LB | Sr |
| 2015 | Evan McKelvey | Marshall | LB | Sr |
| 2016 | Trey Hendrickson | Florida Atlantic | DE | Sr |
| 2017 | Marcus Davenport | UTSA | DE | Sr |
| 2018 | Jaylon Ferguson | Louisiana Tech | LB | Sr |
| 2019 | DeAngelo Malone | Western Kentucky | LB | Jr |
| 2020 | Tavante Beckett | Marshall | LB | Sr |
| 2021 | DeAngelo Malone (2) | Western Kentucky | LB | Sr |
| 2022 | KD Davis | North Texas | LB | Sr |
| 2023 | Tyren Dupree | Liberty | LB | Sr |
| 2024 | Travion Barnes | FIU | LB | Sr |
| 2025 | Jacob Fields | Louisiana Tech | DB | Jr |
| 2025 | Baron Hopson | Kennesaw State | LB | Sr |

=== Winners by school ===
| School (Seasons) | Winners | Years |
|---|---|---|
| Southern Miss (1996–2022) | 8 | 1997, 1998, 1999, 2000, 2003, 2004, 2005, 2007 |
| Marshall (2005–2022) | 5 | 2006, 2011, 2014, 2015, 2020 |
| UCF (2005–2013) | 3 | 2009, 2010, 2012 |
| Houston (1996–2013) | 2 | 2000, 2008 |
| Louisiana Tech (2013–present) | 2 | 2018, 2025 |
| Louisville (1996–2005) | 2 | 1996, 2001 |
| Tulsa (2005–2014) | 2 | 2006, 2013 |
| Western Kentucky (2014–present) | 2 | 2019, 2021 |
| FIU (2013–present) | 1 | 2024 |
| Florida Atlantic (2013–2023) | 1 | 2016 |
| Kennesaw State (2024–present) | 1 | 2025 |
| Liberty (2023–present) | 1 | 2023 |
| North Texas (2013–2023) | 1 | 2022 |
| TCU (2001–2005) | 1 | 2002 |
| UTSA (2013–2023) | 1 | 2017 |

== Special Teams Player of the Year ==
The Special Teams Player of the Year award is given to the player voted best on special teams. The recipient can either be a placekicker, punter, returner, or a position known as a gunner.

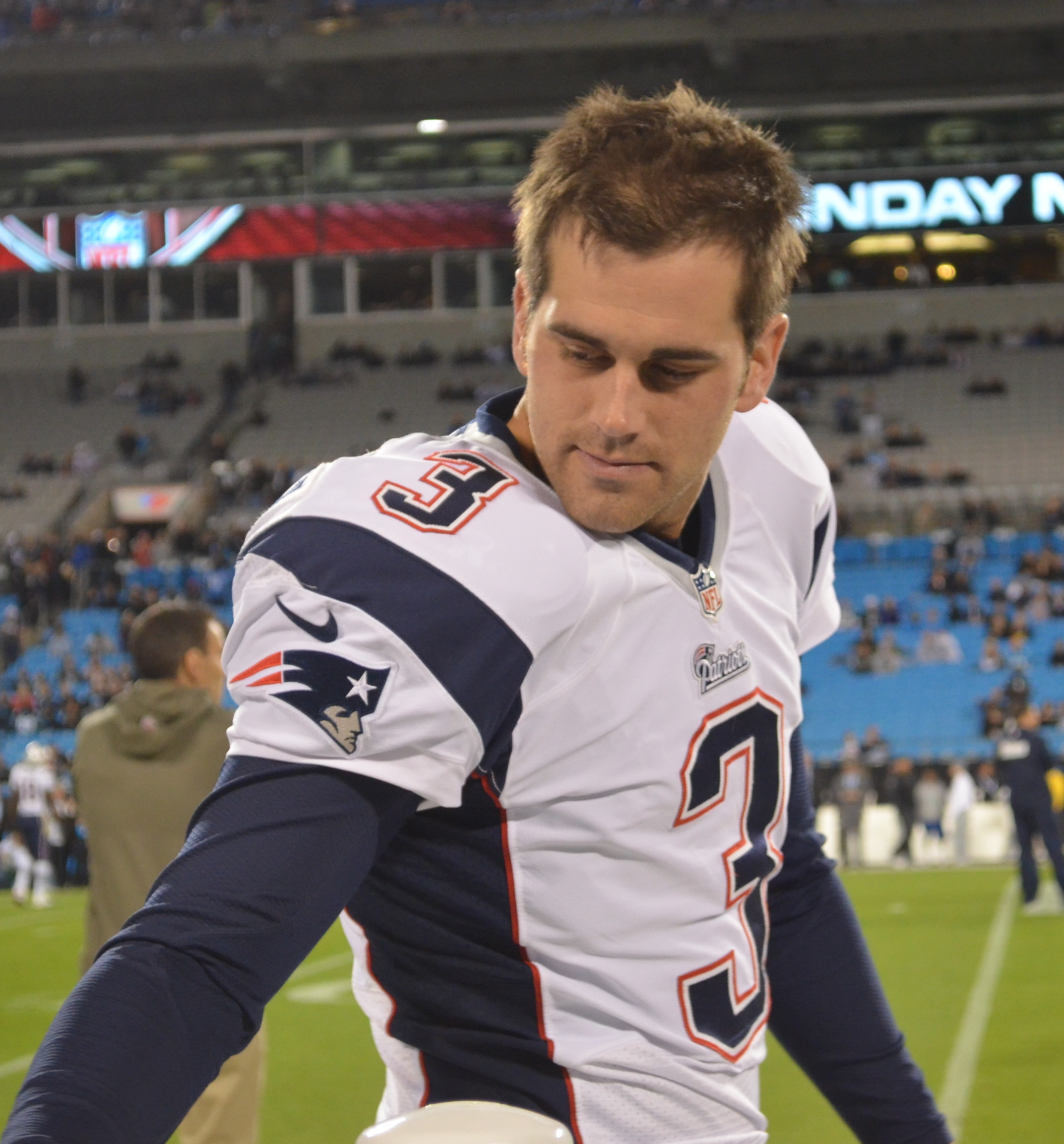
Stephen Gostkowski won Special Teams Player of the Year in 2005. During that season, he would go a perfect 35 of 35 on extra points and 22 of 25 on field goals. He was drafted in the fourth round of the 2006 NFL Draft by the New England Patriots and was a three time Super Bowl champion.

=== Winners ===
Positions key
| PK | Placekicker | KR | Kick returner | P | Punter | PR | Punt returner | RS | Return specialist |
Class key
| Fr | Freshman | So | Sophomore | Jr | Junior | Sr | Senior | | |

| Season | Player | School | Position | Class |
|---|---|---|---|---|
| 1996 | Jeff Liggon | Tulane | KR | Sr |
| 1997 | Tinker Keck | Cincinnati | PR | Fr |
| 1998 | Ryan White | Memphis | PK | Fr |
| 1999 | Rodregis Brooks | UAB | PR | Fr |
| 2000 | Jonathan Ruffin | Cincinnati | PK | So |
| 2001 | Seth Marler | Tulane | PK | Jr |
| 2002 | Broderick Clark | Louisville | KR | Fr |
| 2003 | Nick Browne | TCU | PK | Jr |
| 2004 | John Eubanks | Southern Miss | KR | Jr |
| 2005 | Stephen Gostkowski | Memphis | PK | Sr |
| 2006 | Johnnie Lee Higgins | UTEP | RS | Sr |
| 2007 | Chris Johnson | East Carolina | KR | Sr |
| 2008 | Joe Burnett | UCF | RS | Sr |
| 2009 | Dwayne Harris | East Carolina | KR | Sr |
| 2010 | Damaris Johnson | Tulsa | RS | Jr |
| 2011 | Tyron Carrier | Houston | KR | Sr |
| 2012 | Quincy McDuffie | UCF | KR | Sr |
| 2013 | Brelan Chancellor | North Texas | RS | Sr |
| 2014 | J.J. Nelson | UAB | KR | Sr |
| 2015 | Deandre Reaves | Marshall | RS | Sr |
| 2016 | Carlos Henderson | Louisiana Tech | KR | Jr |
| 2017 | Isaiah Harper | Old Dominion | KR | Jr |
| 2018 | Jack Fox | Rice | P | Sr |
| 2019 | Justin Rohrwasser | Marshall | PK | Sr |
| 2020 | Lucas Dean | UTSA | P | So |
| 2021 | Tommy Heatherly | FIU | P | Sr |
| 2022 | Gavin Baechle | UTEP | PK | Sr |
| 2023 | Ethan Albertson | New Mexico State | PK | Sr |
| 2024 | Lucas Carneiro | Western Kentucky | PK | Jr |
| 2025 | Cole Maynard | Western Kentucky | P | Sr |

=== Winners by school ===
| School (Seasons) | Winners | Years |
|---|---|---|
| Cincinnati (1996–2005) | 2 | 1997, 2000 |
| East Carolina (1997–2014) | 2 | 2007, 2009 |
| Marshall (2005–2022) | 2 | 2015, 2019 |
| Memphis (1996–2013) | 2 | 1998, 2005 |
| Tulane (1996–2014) | 2 | 1996, 2001 |
| UAB (1999–2015, 2017–2023) | 2 | 1999, 2014 |
| UCF (2005–2013) | 2 | 2008, 2012 |
| UTEP (2005–2026) | 2 | 2006, 2022 |
| Western Kentucky (2014–present) | 2 | 2024, 2025 |
| FIU (2013–present) | 1 | 2021 |
| Houston (1996–2013) | 1 | 2011 |
| Louisiana Tech (2013–present) | 1 | 2016 |
| Louisville (1996–2005) | 1 | 2002 |
| New Mexico State (2023–present) | 1 | 2023 |
| North Texas (2013–2023) | 1 | 2013 |
| Old Dominion (2014–2022) | 1 | 2017 |
| Rice (2005–2023) | 1 | 2018 |
| Southern Miss (1996–2022) | 1 | 2004 |
| TCU (2001–2005) | 1 | 2003 |
| Tulsa (2005–2014) | 1 | 2010 |
| UTSA (2013–2023) | 1 | 2020 |

== Freshman of the Year ==
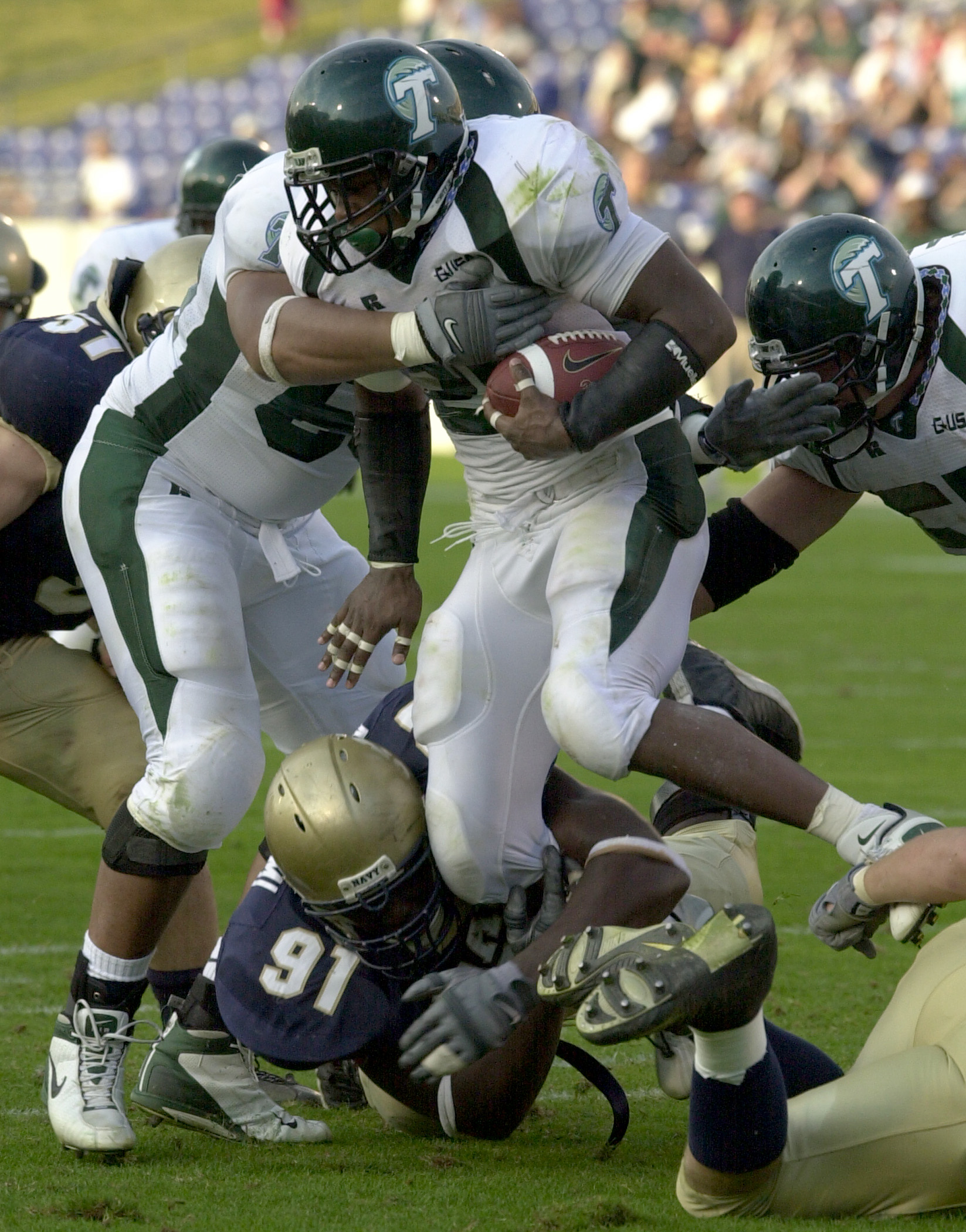
Mewelde Moore was named Freshman of the Year following the 2000 season. During that season, he posted 1,240 all-purpose yards and three total touchdowns.

The Freshman of the Year award is given to the conference's best freshman.

=== Winners ===
| Season | Player | School | Position |
|---|---|---|---|
| 1996 | Ketric Sanford | Houston | RB/KR |
| 1997 | Jason McKinley | Houston | QB |
| 1998 | Derrick Nix | Southern Miss | RB |
| 1999 | LaDaris Vann | Cincinnati | WR |
| 1999 | Travis Anglin | Memphis | QB |
| 2000 | Mewelde Moore | Tulane | RB |
| 2001 | Gino Guidugli | Cincinnati | QB |
| 2002 | Lonta Hobbs | TCU | RB |
| 2003 | Kevin Kolb | Houston | QB |
| 2004 | Brian Brohm | Louisville | QB |
| 2005 | Kevin Smith | UCF | RB |
| 2006 | Justin Willis | SMU | QB |
| 2007 | Case Keenum | Houston | QB |
| 2008 | Bryce Beall | Houston | RB |
| 2009 | Charles Sims | Houston | RB |
| 2010 | Jeff Godfrey | UCF | QB |
| 2011 | Jeremy Grove | East Carolina | LB |
| 2012 | Kevin Grooms | Marshall | RB |
| 2013 | Corey Tindal | Marshall | DB |
| 2013 | Nico Marley | Tulane | LB |
| 2014 | Ray Lawry | Old Dominion | RB |
| 2015 | Brent Stockstill | Middle Tennessee State | QB |
| 2016 | Josiah Tauaefa | UTSA | LB |
| 2017 | Spencer Brown | UAB | RB |
| 2018 | Chris Robison | Florida Atlantic | QB |
| 2018 | Isaiah Green | Marshall | QB |
| 2019 | Sincere McCormick | UTSA | RB |
| 2020 | Grant Wells | Marshall | QB |
| 2021 | Elijah Spencer | Charlotte | WR |
| 2022 | Kevorian Barnes | UTSA | RB |
| 2023 | Michael Richard | Louisiana Tech | DB |
| 2024 | DJ McKinney | Sam Houston | RB |
| 2025 | Rodney Tisdale Jr. | Western Kentucky | QB |

=== Winners by school ===
| School (Seasons) | Winners | Years |
|---|---|---|
| Houston (1996–2013) | 6 | 1996, 1997, 2003, 2007, 2008, 2009 |
| Marshall (2005–2022) | 4 | 2012, 2013, 2018, 2020 |
| UTSA (2013–2023) | 3 | 2016, 2019, 2022 |
| Cincinnati (1996–2005) | 2 | 1999, 2001 |
| Tulane (1996–2014) | 2 | 2000, 2013 |
| UCF (2005–2013) | 2 | 2005, 2010 |
| Charlotte (2015–2023) | 1 | 2021 |
| East Carolina (1997–2014) | 1 | 2011 |
| Florida Atlantic (2013–2023) | 1 | 2018 |
| Louisiana Tech (2013–present) | 1 | 2023 |
| Louisville (1996–2005) | 1 | 2004 |
| Memphis (1996–2013) | 1 | 1999 |
| Middle Tennessee State (2013–present) | 1 | 2015 |
| Old Dominion (2014–2022) | 1 | 2014 |
| Sam Houston (2023–present) | 1 | 2024 |
| SMU (2005–2013) | 1 | 2006 |
| Southern Miss (1996–2022) | 1 | 1998 |
| TCU (2001–2005) | 1 | 2002 |
| UAB (1999–2015, 2017–2023) | 1 | 2017 |
| Western Kentucky (2014–present) | 1 | 2025 |

== Newcomer of the Year ==
The Newcomer of the Year award is given to the conference's best transfer.

=== Winners ===
| Season | Player | School | Position |
|---|---|---|---|
| 2007 | Brennan Marion | Tulsa | WR |
| 2008 | Curtis Steele | Memphis | RB |
| 2009 | James Cleveland | Houston | WR |
| 2010 | Dominique Davis | East Carolina | QB |
| 2011 | D.J. Hayden | Houston | DB |
| 2012 | Vintavious Coope | East Carolina | RB |
| 2013 | Jaquez Johnson | Florida Atlantic | QB |
| 2014 | Cody Sokol | Louisiana Tech | QB |
| 2015 | Jeff Driskel | Louisiana Tech | QB |
| 2016 | Mike White | Western Kentucky | QB |
| 2017 | Jalen Guyton | North Texas | WR |
| 2017 | Teddy Veal | Louisiana Tech | WR |
| 2018 | James Morgan | FIU | QB |
| 2019 | Ty Storey | Western Kentucky | QB |
| 2020 | Luke Anthony | Louisiana Tech | QB |
| 2021 | Jerreth Sterns | Western Kentucky | WR |
| 2022 | Austin Reed | Western Kentucky | QB |
| 2023 | Quinton Cooley | Liberty | RB |
| 2024 | Tyler Huff | Jacksonville State | QB |
| 2025 | Cam Cook | Jacksonville State | RB |

=== Winners by school ===
| School (Seasons) | Winners | Years |
|---|---|---|
| Louisiana Tech (2013–present) | 4 | 2014, 2015, 2017, 2020 |
| Western Kentucky (2014–present) | 4 | 2016, 2019, 2021, 2022 |
| East Carolina (1997–2014) | 2 | 2010, 2012 |
| Houston (1996–2013) | 2 | 2009, 2011 |
| Jacksonville State (2023–present) | 2 | 2024, 2025 |
| FIU (2013–present) | 1 | 2018 |
| Florida Atlantic (2013–2023) | 1 | 2013 |
| Liberty (2023–present) | 1 | 2023 |
| Memphis (1996–2013) | 1 | 2008 |
| North Texas (2013–2023) | 1 | 2017 |
| Tulsa (2005–2014) | 1 | 2007 |

== Coach of the Year ==
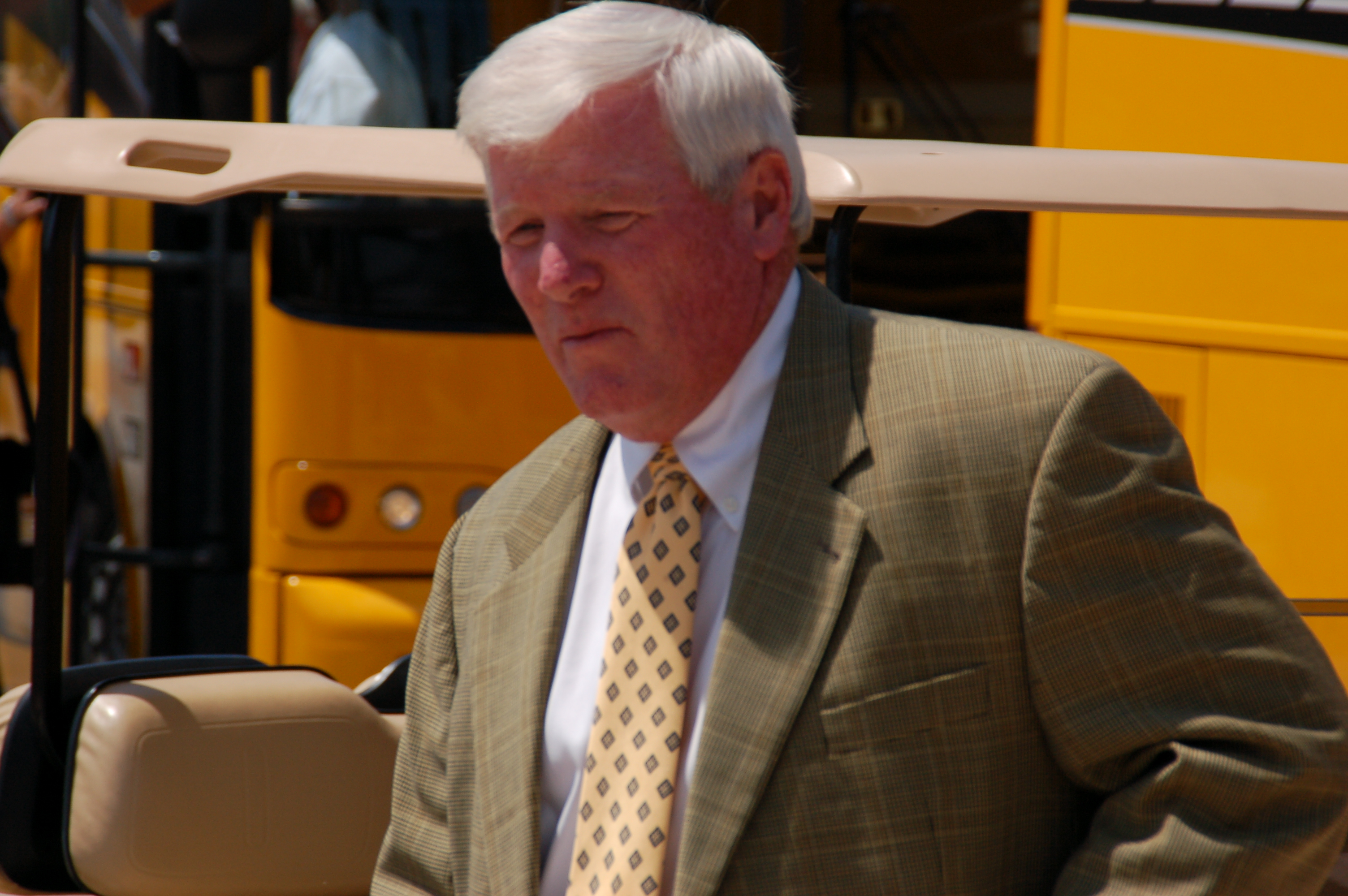
George O'Leary is one of two awardees to be named C-USA Coach of the Year thrice. He shares this honor with former Southern Miss coach Jeff Bower. O'Leary won the award in 2005, 2007, and 2010 with records of 8-5, 10-4, and 11-3.

=== Winners ===
| Season | Coach | School | Record |
|---|---|---|---|
| 1996 | Kim Helton | Houston | 7-5 |
| 1997 | Jeff Bower | Southern Miss | 9-3 |
| 1998 | Tommy Bowden | Tulane | 11-0 |
| 1999 | Jeff Bower (2) | Southern Miss | 9-3 |
| 2000 | John Smith | Louisville | 9-3 |
| 2001 | John Smith (2) | Louisville | 11-2 |
| 2002 | Gary Patterson | TCU | 10-2 |
| 2003 | Jeff Bower (3) | Southern Miss | 9-4 |
| 2004 | Bobby Petrino | Louisville | 11-1 |
| 2005 | George O'Leary | UCF | 8-5 |
| 2006 | Art Briles | Houston | 10-4 |
| 2006 | Todd Graham | Rice | 7-6 |
| 2007 | George O'Leary (2) | UCF | 10-4 |
| 2008 | David Bailiff | Rice | 10-3 |
| 2009 | Kevin Sumlin | Houston | 10-4 |
| 2010 | George O'Leary (3) | UCF | 11-3 |
| 2011 | Kevin Sumlin (2) | Houston | 12-1 |
| 2012 | Bill Blankenship | Tulsa | 11-3 |
| 2013 | David Bailiff (2) | Rice | 10-4 |
| 2014 | Bill Clark | UAB | 6-6 |
| 2015 | Todd Monken | Southern Miss | 9-5 |
| 2016 | Skip Holtz | Louisiana Tech | 9-5 |
| 2017 | Bill Clark (2) | UAB | 8-5 |
| 2018 | Rick Stockstill | Middle Tennessee State | 8-6 |
| 2019 | Tyson Helton | Western Kentucky | 9-4 |
| 2020 | Doc Holliday | Marshall | 7-3 |
| 2021 | Jeff Traylor | UTSA | 12-2 |
| 2022 | Jeff Traylor (2) | UTSA | 11-3 |
| 2023 | Jamey Chadwell | Liberty | 13-1 |
| 2023 | Jerry Kill | New Mexico State | 10-5 |
| 2024 | Rich Rodriguez | Jacksonville State | 9-5 |
| 2025 | Jerry Mack | Kennesaw State | 9-3 |

=== Winners by school ===
| School (Seasons) | Winners | Years |
|---|---|---|
| Houston (1996–2013) | 4 | 1996, 2006, 2009, 2011 |
| Southern Miss (1996–2022) | 4 | 1997, 1999, 2003, 2015 |
| Louisville (1996–2005) | 3 | 2000, 2001, 2004 |
| Rice (2005–2023) | 3 | 2006, 2008, 2013 |
| UCF (2005–2013) | 3 | 2005, 2007, 2010 |
| UAB (1999–2015, 2017–2023) | 2 | 2014, 2017 |
| UTSA (2013–2023) | 2 | 2021, 2022 |
| Jacksonville State (2023–present) | 1 | 2024 |
| Kennesaw State (2024–present) | 1 | 2025 |
| Liberty (2023–present) | 1 | 2023 |
| Louisiana Tech (2013–present) | 1 | 2016 |
| Marshall (2005–2022) | 1 | 2020 |
| Middle Tennessee State (2013–present) | 1 | 2018 |
| New Mexico State (2023–present) | 1 | 2023 |
| TCU (2001–2005) | 1 | 2002 |
| Tulane (1996–2014) | 1 | 1998 |
| Tulsa (2005–2014) | 1 | 2012 |
| Western Kentucky (2014–present) | 1 | 2019 |
