= Cam Cook =

American football player

No. 4 – West Virginia Mountaineers
- Position: Running back
- Class: Senior

Personal information
- Listed height: 5 ft 9 in (1.75 m)
- Listed weight: 202 lb (92 kg)

Career information
- High school: Stony Point (Round Rock, Texas)
- College: TCU (2023–2024); Jacksonville State (2025); West Virginia (2026–present)

Awards and highlights
- CUSA Player of the Year (2025); CUSA Newcomer of the Year (2025); First-team All-CUSA (2025)
- Stats at ESPN

Cameron Cook is an American college football running back for the West Virginia Mountaineers. He previously played for the TCU Horned Frogs and Jacksonville State Gamecocks.

== Early life ==
Cook attended Stony Point High School in Round Rock, Texas. As a senior, he rushed for 1,589 yards and 20 touchdowns. A four-star recruit, Cook committed to play college football at Texas Christian University.

== College career ==
As a true freshman, Cook ran for 58 yards on 16 carries. He earned more playing time the following season, rushing for three touchdowns in a 45–0 victory over LIU. Cook finished the 2024 season as the team's leading rusher, recording 119 carries for 460 yards and nine touchdowns. Following the conclusion of the season, he entered the transfer portal.

On January 13, 2025, Cook announced his decision to transfer to Jacksonville State University to play for the Jacksonville State Gamecocks. He entered the 2025 season as the Gamecock's starting running back. Cook ended the season with 295 carries for 1,661 yards and 16 touchdowns; his 1,661 rushing yards were the most in the country. He also had 30 receptions for 286 yards.

On January 6, 2026, Cook announced his decision to transfer to West Virginia University to play for the West Virginia Mountaineers.

=== Statistics ===
Legend
	Conference USA Player of the Year
	Led NCAA Division I FBS
**Bold**	Career best

Year	Team	Games		Rushing				Receiving			
Year	Team	GP	GS	Att	Yds	Avg	TD	Rec	Yds	Avg	TD
2023	TCU	9	0	16	58	3.6	0	0	0	0.0	0
2024	TCU	12	6	119	460	3.9	9	18	75	4.2	0
2025	Jacksonville State	13	13	**295**	**1,659**	**5.6**	**16**	**30**	**286**	**9.5**	0
2026	West Virginia	9	9	209	1,072	5.1	8	13	124	**9.5**	**2**
Career		43	28	639	3,249	5.1	33	61	485	8.0	2
