= Case Keenum =

American football player (born 1988)

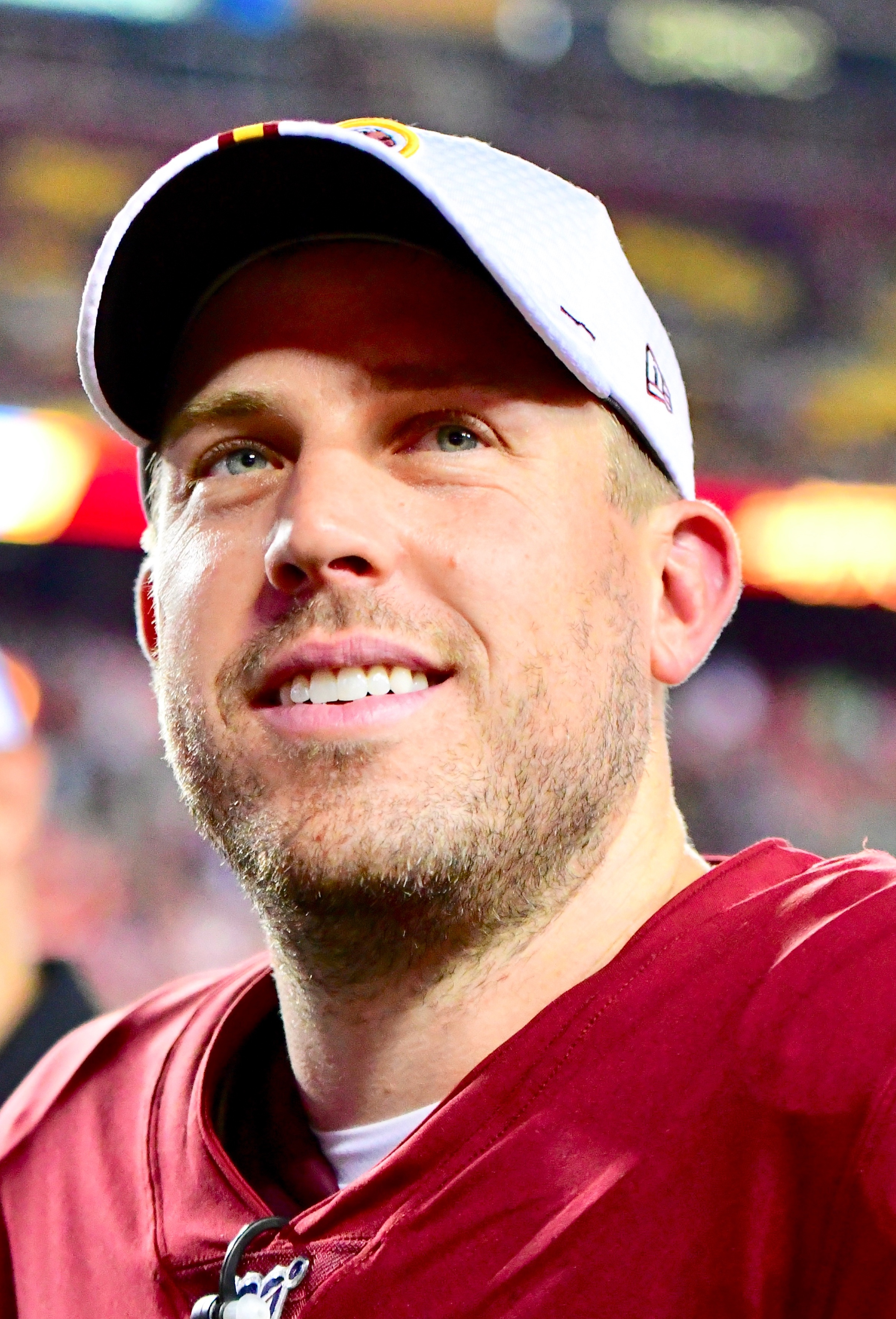
- Keenum with the Washington Redskins in 2019

No. 11 – Chicago Bears
- Position: Quarterback
- Roster status: Active

Personal information
- Born: February 17, 1988 (age 38); Brownwood, Texas, U.S.
- Listed height: 6 ft 1 in (1.85 m)
- Listed weight: 220 lb (100 kg)

Career information
- High school: Wylie (Abilene, Texas)
- College: Houston (2006–2011)
- NFL draft: 2012: undrafted

Career history
- Houston Texans (2012–2013); St. Louis Rams (2014); Houston Texans (2014); St. Louis / Los Angeles Rams (2015–2016); Minnesota Vikings (2017); Denver Broncos (2018); Washington Redskins (2019); Cleveland Browns (2020–2021); Buffalo Bills (2022); Houston Texans (2023–2024); Chicago Bears (2025–present)

Awards and highlights
- 2× Sammy Baugh Trophy (2009, 2011); First-team All-American (2009); 2× NCAA passing yards leader (2009, 2011); 2× NCAA passing touchdowns leader (2009, 2011); 2× C-USA Most Valuable Player (2009, 2011); C-USA Offensive Player of the Year (2008); C-USA Freshman of the Year (2007); 2× First-team All-C-USA (2009, 2011); Second-team All-C-USA (2008); Houston Cougars No. 7 retired; NCAA (FBS) records: Most career passing yards: 19,217; Most career pass completions: 1,546; Most career TD passes: 155 (tied; Dillon Gabriel)

Career NFL statistics as of Week 5, 2026
- Passing attempts: 2,286
- Passing completions: 1,427
- Completion percentage: 62.4%
- TD–INT: 81–52
- Passing yards: 15,530
- Passer rating: 84.7
- Stats at Pro Football Reference

Casey Austin Keenum (born February 17, 1988) is an American professional football player who is a quarterback for the Chicago Bears of the National Football League (NFL). He played college football for the Houston Cougars, where he became the NCAA's all-time leader in total passing yards, touchdowns, and completions. In the 2008 college football season, Keenum ranked first nationally in total offense and second in total passing yards.

During the 2011 season, Keenum became the Football Bowl Subdivision's all-time leader in total offense, as well as the all-time leader in total passing yards and touchdown passes by a college quarterback. As a result of his on-field contributions to Houston's success, Keenum was named to several All-American lists. He is the only quarterback in Division I FBS football history to have passed for more than 5,000 yards in each of three seasons, and the only college player to reach the 20,000-yards plateau in career total offense.

After being signed by the Houston Texans as an undrafted free agent in 2012, Keenum threw for 1,760 yards and nine touchdowns in the eight games he started for the Texans in 2013 before being waived prior to the 2014 season. He was then signed to the St. Louis Rams' practice squad and then re-signed with the Texans later in 2014. In 2015, the Rams (who later relocated to Los Angeles) traded a draft pick to the Texans for Keenum, where he played until signing as a free agent with the Minnesota Vikings in 2017.

After starter Sam Bradford was injured, Keenum came in and had a career year, setting highs in starts, passing yards, completions, and touchdowns. He led the Vikings to a 13-win regular season, followed by a last-second win, known as the Minneapolis Miracle, over the New Orleans Saints in the playoffs leading to an appearance in the NFC Championship game. Following that, Keenum played for the Denver Broncos, Washington Redskins, Cleveland Browns, Buffalo Bills, Texans, and Chicago Bears.

== Early life ==
Keenum played football for Wylie High School in Abilene, Texas. During his high school football career, Keenum passed for 6,783 yards and 48 touchdowns and rushed for 41 touchdowns and 2,000 yards for the Bulldogs. Logging 42 starts at quarterback, he posted a career record of 31–11. In 2004, Keenum led Wylie in the game-winning drive for a 17–14 victory over Cuero High School of Cuero, Texas in the Texas Class 3A Division I Championship. Keenum earned varsity letters in basketball and track during his high school career.

In addition to being recruited by the University of Houston, Keenum received walk-on offers from Baylor, Missouri, North Texas, and UTEP, but Houston was the only FBS university to offer him a scholarship over FCS offers from Sam Houston State and Stephen F. Austin.

College recruiting
Name	Hometown	School	Height	Weight	40^{‡}	Commit date
Case Keenum; QB	Abilene, Texas	Wylie HS	6 ft 1 in (1.85 m)	183 lb (83 kg)	4.68	Jan 27, 2006
Case Keenum; QB	Recruit ratings: Scout: Rivals:					
Overall recruit ranking: Scout: 69 (college recruiting) Rivals: 91 (college recruiting)
‡ Refers to 40-yard dash; Note: In many cases, Scout, Rivals, 247Sports, On3, and ESPN may conflict in their listings of height, weight and 40 time.; In these cases, the average was taken. ESPN grades are on a 100-point scale.; Sources: "2006 Houston Football Commitment List". Rivals.; "2006 Houston College Football Recruiting Commits". Scout.; "Scout.com Team Recruiting Rankings". Scout.; "2006 Team Ranking". Rivals.com.

== College career ==
=== 2006 season ===
Keenum began his college career for the Houston Cougars during the 2006 season. During Keenum's freshman season, senior Kevin Kolb held the starting quarterback position for the Cougars, leading the coaching staff to redshirt Keenum for the season. The 2006 Cougars won the Conference USA championship, and Kolb was drafted by the NFL's Philadelphia Eagles.

=== 2007 season ===
In fall camp before the 2007 season, the Cougars held a de facto quarterback competition to fill the starting spot vacated by the departure of four-year starter Kevin Kolb. The competition swung between Keenum and sophomore Blake Joseph throughout two-a-days and during much of the season, with each player displaying a different set of strengths and weaknesses.

Keenum made his first collegiate appearance on September 1, 2007, when the Cougars opened the season at Oregon. He threw for 179 yards and a touchdown on 14-of-27 passing and added 47 rushing yards on nine carries against the Ducks. Against C-USA rival Tulane in the second game, Keenum threw for 185 yards and a touchdown on 13-of-21 passing, leading Houston to a 34–10 victory. In the third game of the year against Colorado State, Keenum came on in relief of starter Blake Joseph and accounted for four touchdowns. For this performance, Keenum was recognized as CollegeSportsReport.com's Division I FBS National Performer of the Week. Keenum played at quarterback in all thirteen games of the season, starting in seven.

Late in the season, the Houston coaching staff selected Keenum to be the regular starting quarterback over Joseph. Keenum's outstanding pocket presence and efficient passing won out in the end over Joseph's stronger arm and running ability. Overall, he finished with 2,259 passing yards, 14 touchdowns, and 10 interceptions. He was named Conference USA Freshman of the Year.

=== 2008 season ===
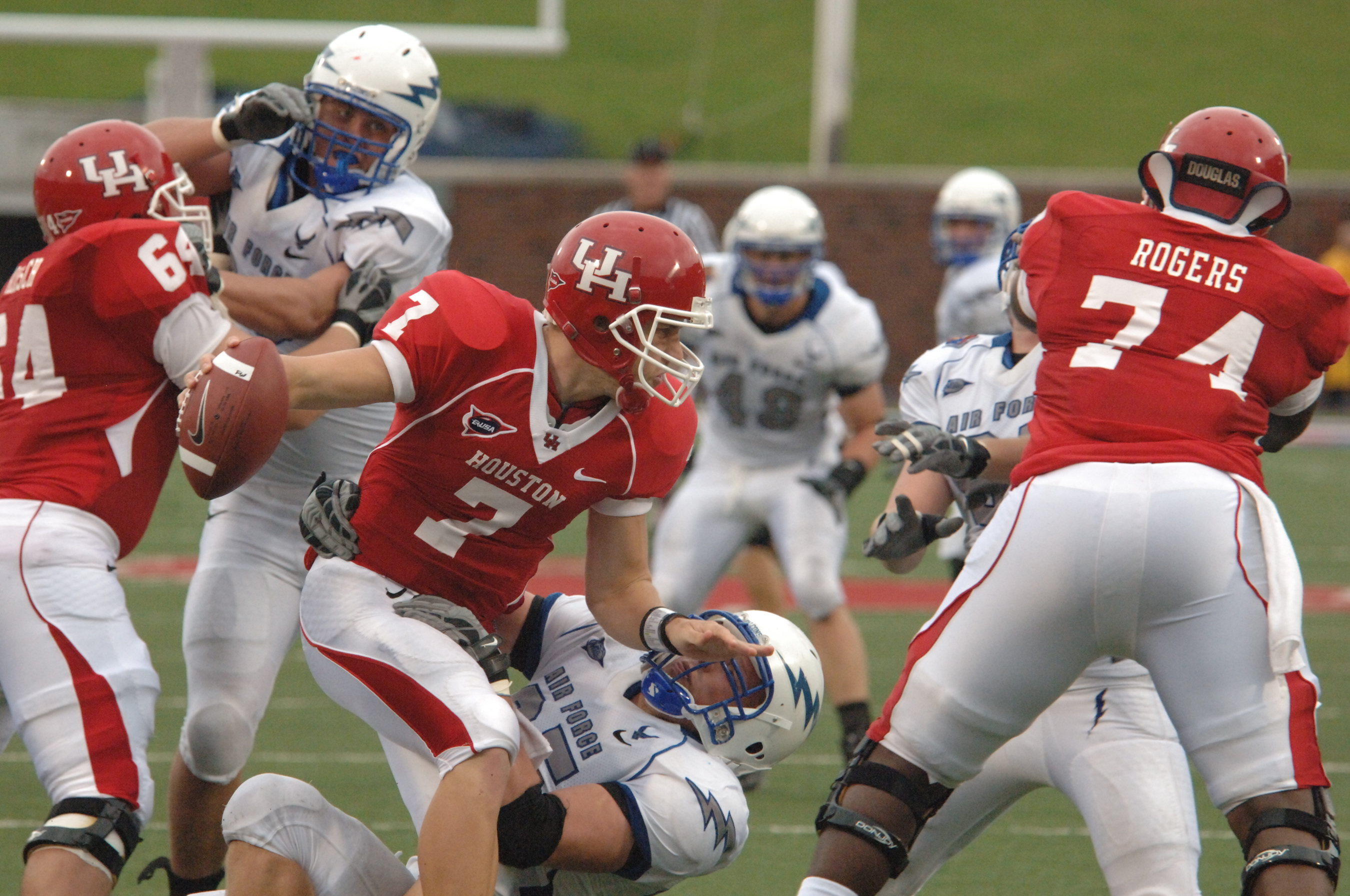
Against Air Force in Dallas in September 2008

During the 2008 season, Keenum became the second player in school history to complete over 5,000 passing yards in one season. He also led the nation in total offense, and was the national runner-up in passing yards, behind Texas Tech's Graham Harrell. The Houston Cougars showed many signs of improvement, winning their first bowl game since 1980 with a victory over Air Force, and defeating two nationally ranked opponents. Following the season, Keenum won the 2008 Conference USA Offensive Player of the Year award.

=== 2009 season ===
Keenum led the Houston Cougars to a 10–4 record in 2009. He finished the season with 48 total touchdowns and over 5,800 total offensive yards. His play helped Houston upset then #5-ranked Oklahoma State, Texas Tech, and later Mississippi State. Houston played East Carolina on the road in the Conference USA Championship, but lost the game in the final minute. Houston faced Air Force in a rematch of the previous year's Armed Forces Bowl and this time Air Force emerged victorious. In cold, windy conditions, Keenum threw six interceptions in the game, and was held to only one touchdown. He finished in eighth place in the Heisman Trophy voting in the 2009 season. Keenum was named as the Conference USA Most Valuable Player and won the Sammy Baugh Trophy.

=== 2010 season ===
Keenum was in a position to challenge more than one major NCAA division passing record at the start of the 2010 season, including career passing yards and touchdowns. However, after throwing for a total of 636 passing yards and three touchdowns in three games, Keenum tore his ACL during the Cougars' third game of the season against UCLA. The injury ended Keenum's season, and Houston finished 5–7. Keenum earned his bachelor's degree in business administration from the University of Houston Bauer College of Business in December 2010.

=== 2011 season ===
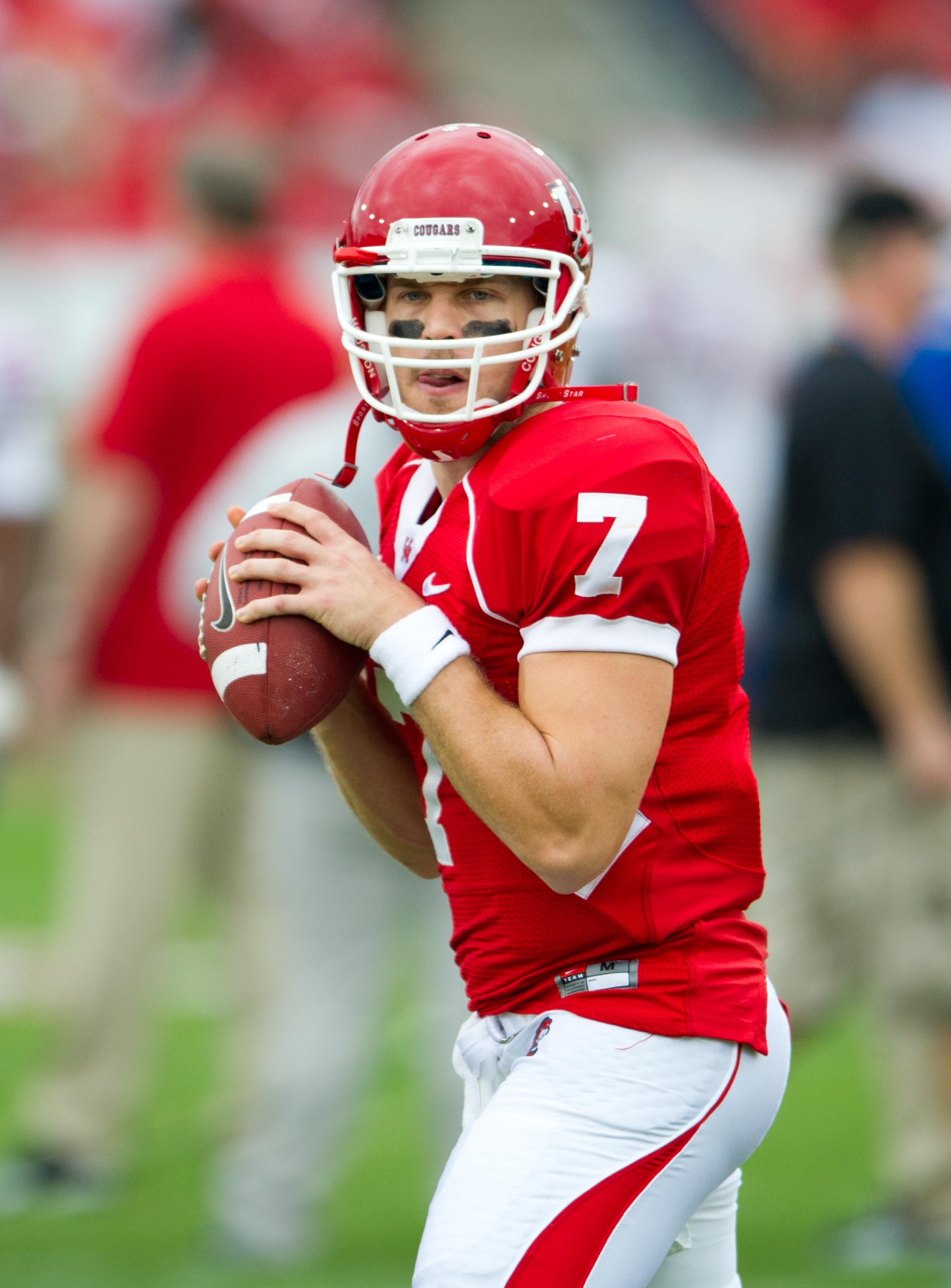
Keenum in 2011

On January 14, 2011, the NCAA granted Keenum a sixth year of eligibility. Prior to the 2011 season, he was named the 2011 Conference USA Preseason Offensive Player of the Year for the third year in a row. On October 27, Keenum set the all-time NCAA Division I passing touchdowns record by throwing for nine touchdowns against Rice. Keenum also enrolled in the University of Houston College of Liberal Arts and Social Sciences studying for a master's degree in sports and fitness administration.

Keenum surpassed Timmy Chang's record for most career passing yards in NCAA history on November 5, 2011. Two weeks later, Keenum set the record for career completions in a 37–7 win over SMU. The Cougars had a record of 12–0 coming into the Conference USA Championship, but were defeated by Southern Miss 49–28. He completed 41 of 67 pass attempts for 373 yards through the air, two touchdown passes, and two interceptions. After the loss, Houston played Penn State in the TicketCity Bowl, where they won 30–14. Keenum passed for 532 yards and three touchdowns. In the 2011 season, he finished in seventh place in the Heisman Trophy voting. For the second time, he was named as the Conference USA Most Valuable Player and won the Sammy Baugh Trophy.

== Professional career ==
Pre-draft measurables
Height	Weight	Arm length	Hand span	Wingspan	40-yard dash	10-yard split	20-yard split	20-yard shuttle	Three-cone drill	Vertical jump	Broad jump	Bench press
6 ft 0 5/8 in (1.84 m)	208 lb (94 kg)	30 7/8 in (0.78 m)	9 1/8 in (0.23 m)	6 ft 2 1/4 in (1.89 m)	4.82 s	1.67 s	2.79 s	4.28 s	6.87 s	32.5 in (0.83 m)	8 ft 7 in (2.62 m)	18 reps
Bench press, shuttle, and cone drill values are from Houston Pro Day; all other values are from the NFL Combine

=== Houston Texans ===
==== 2012 season ====
Despite his collegiate success, Keenum went undrafted and signed with the Houston Texans. He spent his entire rookie year on their practice squad.

==== 2013 season ====
In 2013, Keenum was placed on the Texans' 53-man roster as a third-string quarterback behind starter Matt Schaub and backup quarterback T. J. Yates. On October 17, head coach Gary Kubiak announced that Keenum would be the starting quarterback over backup Yates for the Week 7 matchup against the Kansas City Chiefs, after starting quarterback Schaub was unable to play due to an injury. In his professional debut three days later, Keenum threw his first NFL touchdown, a 29-yarder to DeAndre Hopkins. Keenum finished the narrow 17–16 road loss completing 15 of 25 passes for 271 yards and the aforementioned touchdown for a 110.6 passer rating, the highest by a Texan quarterback in the season. Two weeks later against the Indianapolis Colts, Keenum had 350 passing yards and three touchdowns (all to Andre Johnson) to go along with 26 rushing yards in the 27–24 loss.

Keenum finished the 2013 season completing 137-of-253 passes for 1,760 yards, nine touchdowns, and six interceptions to go along with 14 carries for 72 yards and a touchdown in eight games and starts.

On August 31, 2014, Keenum was waived by the Texans to clear a roster space for recently acquired quarterback Ryan Mallett.

=== St. Louis Rams ===
On September 1, 2014, Keenum was claimed off waivers by the St. Louis Rams. He was waived by the Rams on October 28 in order to make room on the roster for newly acquired safety Mark Barron. Keenum re-signed to the team's practice squad two days later.

=== Houston Texans (second stint) ===
On December 15, 2014, Keenum was signed off the Rams' practice squad back to the Texans. He filled a roster spot after starting quarterback Ryan Fitzpatrick broke his leg during a Week 15 17–10 road loss to the Colts. The following week, Keenum won his first NFL game as a starter after the Texans beat the Baltimore Ravens by a score of 25–13 and finished the game with 185 passing yards and an interception. In the regular-season finale against the Jacksonville Jaguars, Keenum threw for 250 yards, two touchdowns, and an interception during the 23–17 victory.

=== St. Louis (second stint) / Los Angeles Rams ===
==== 2015 season ====
On March 11, 2015, Keenum was traded to the Rams for a seventh-round pick in 2016. Head coach Jeff Fisher announced that Keenum would be the backup quarterback to recently acquired Nick Foles. On November 16, the Rams named Keenum the starting quarterback after announcing they had benched Foles.

Near the end of a Week 11 16–13 road loss to the Ravens, Keenum suffered a concussion that left him visibly wobbly but was not removed from the game for evaluation. This led to an investigation by the NFL and the NFL Players Association.

Keenum recovered from the concussion and led the Rams to consecutive victories against the Detroit Lions, Tampa Bay Buccaneers, and Seattle Seahawks. He recorded a franchise record near-"perfect game" against the Buccaneers, achieving a 158.0 passer rating by going 14-of-17 for 234 yards and two touchdowns in the last home game in St. Louis Rams history during the 31–23 victory.

Keenum finished the 2015 season with 828 yards, four touchdowns, and an interception in six games and five starts.

==== 2016 season ====
On January 12, 2016, the Rams officially moved back to Los Angeles. It was announced via Fisher and general manager Les Snead that Keenum would be the starting quarterback heading into training camp. On April 18, Keenum signed a one-year first round restricted free-agent tender with the Rams. On August 6, he was named the starter in the preseason opener against the Dallas Cowboys. After the preseason, Keenum began the regular season as the starting quarterback. After a 28–0 shutout road loss to the San Francisco 49ers in the season-opener on Monday Night Football, he led the team to three straight victories over the Seahawks, Buccaneers, and Arizona Cardinals.

During a Week 6 31–28 road loss to the Lions, Keenum completed 27 of 32 passes for 321 yards, three touchdowns, and an interception to go along with a rushing touchdown and also set a team record with 19 consecutive completions. In the next game against the New York Giants, Keenum threw for 291 yards, a touchdown, and four interceptions during the 17–10 road loss. After the game, Rams head coach Jeff Fisher announced his decision to keep Keenum as the starter. On November 15, 2016, Keenum was benched for Jared Goff, who the Rams drafted first overall in the 2016 NFL draft.

Keenum finished the 2016 season with 2,201 passing yards, nine touchdowns, and 11 interceptions to go along with 20 carries for 51 yards and a touchdown in 10 games and nine starts.

=== Minnesota Vikings ===
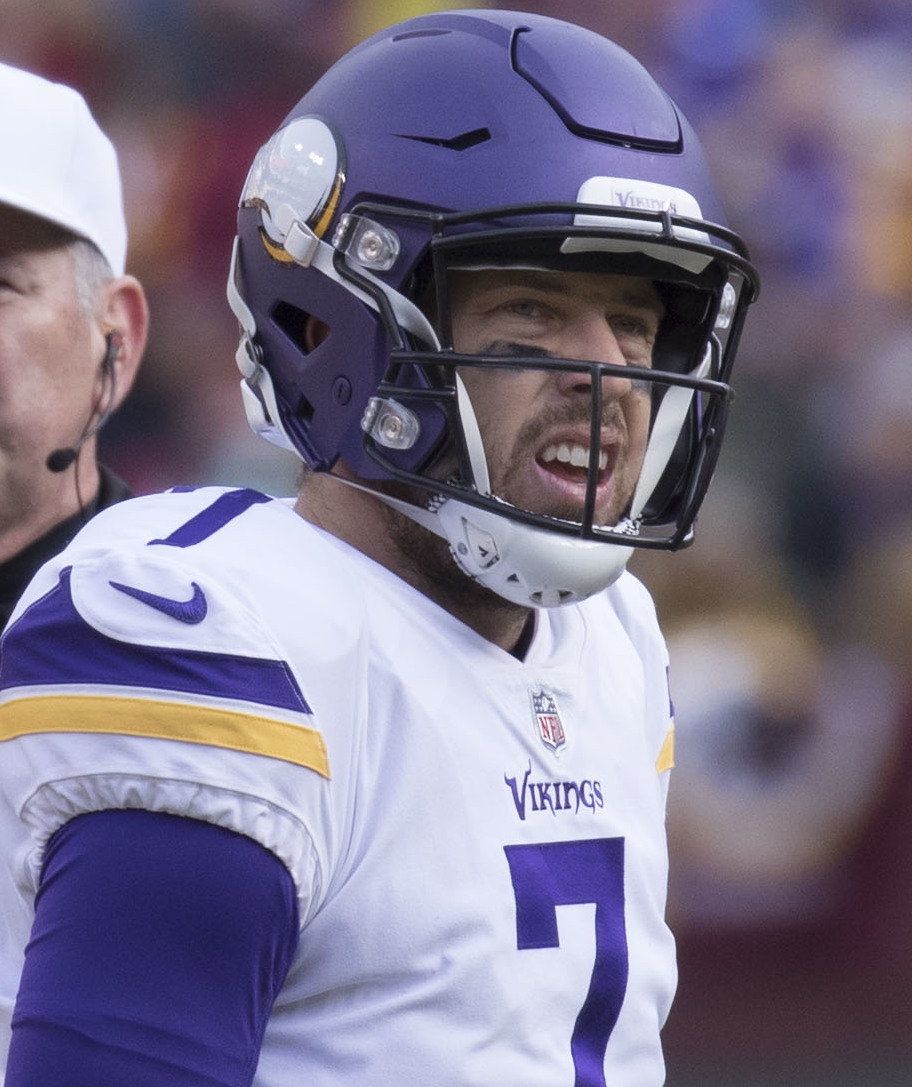
Keenum in 2017

On March 31, 2017, Keenum signed a one-year contract with the Minnesota Vikings.

Due to an injury to Sam Bradford, Keenum started in the Week 2 matchup against the Pittsburgh Steelers, completing 20 of 37 passes for 167 yards during the 26–9 road loss. In the next game against the Buccaneers, he threw for 369 yards and three touchdowns during the 34–17 victory. Through Weeks 4–7, Keenum averaged 196 yards with a total of two touchdowns and two interceptions, but a record of 3–1 over the span.

During a Week 8 33–16 victory over the winless Cleveland Browns in London, Keenum recorded 288 passing yards and two touchdowns to enter the bye week. Following a Week 9 bye, he threw for 304 yards, four touchdowns, and two interceptions in a 38–30 victory over the Washington Redskins as the Vikings won their fifth straight game. In the next game against his former team, the Rams, Keenum finished with 280 passing yards and a touchdown in the 24–7 victory, resulting in six straight games won. The following week against the Lions on Thanksgiving, he had 282 passing yards and two touchdowns to go along with seven carries for 20 yards and a touchdown in the 30–23 road victory. Keenum was named the NFC Offensive Player of the Month for November after passing for 866 yards, seven touchdowns, and just two interceptions.

During a Week 13 14–9 victory over the Atlanta Falcons, Keenum completed 25-of-30 passes for 227 yards and two touchdowns. In the next game against the Carolina Panthers, he had 280 passing yards, two touchdowns, and an interception to go along with a season-high 40 rushing yards during the 31–24 road loss. The following week against the Cincinnati Bengals, Keenum completed 20-of-23 passes for 236 yards and two touchdowns while also recording a 20-yard carry in the 34–7 victory.

Keenum finished the 2017 season with 3,547 passing yards, 22 touchdowns, seven interceptions, and a passer rating of 98.3 to go along with 40 carries for 160 yards and a touchdown in 15 games and 14 starts. He was ranked 51st by his peers on the NFL Top 100 Players of 2018.

The Vikings finished atop the NFC North with a 13–3 record and earned a first-round bye in the playoffs as the #2-seed. In the Divisional Round against the New Orleans Saints, Keenum threw for 318 yards, a touchdown, and an interception. With 10 seconds left in the fourth quarter, he threw a pass to Stefon Diggs, who ran 61 yards for the game-winning touchdown, giving the Vikings a miraculous 29–24 victory. After that, Keenum led the Vikings fans in the "skol" chant. During the NFC Championship Game, the Vikings lost on the road by a score of 38–7 by the eventual Super Bowl champions, the Philadelphia Eagles, led by Keenum's close friend and former Rams teammate Nick Foles. Keenum finished with 271 passing yards, a touchdown, and two interceptions.

After the season, Keenum became a free agent after the Vikings decided not to franchise tag him.

=== Denver Broncos ===
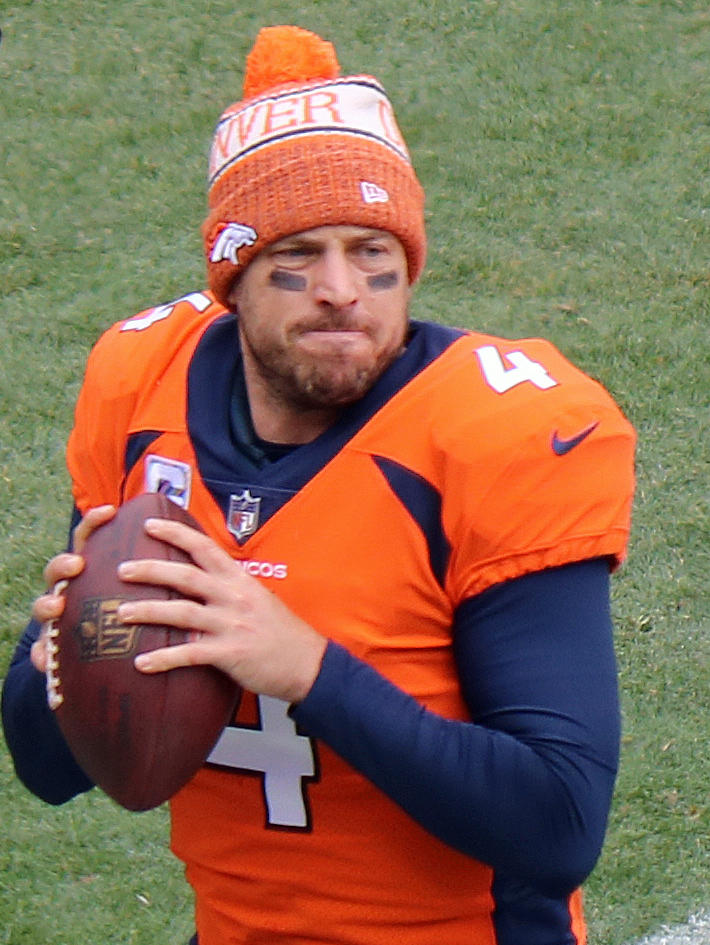
Keenum in 2018

On March 14, 2018, Keenum signed a two-year, $36 million contract with the Denver Broncos. The signing reunited him with head coach Vance Joseph, who was the defensive backs coach during Keenum's first stint with the Texans, as well as senior personnel advisor Gary Kubiak, who was the Texans' head coach.

Keenum made his Broncos debut during the season-opener against the Seahawks and finished the 27–24 victory with 329 passing yards, three touchdowns, and three interceptions. In the next game against the Oakland Raiders, he threw for 222 yards and an interception to go along with three carries for 16 yards and a touchdown during the narrow 20–19 victory. Three weeks later against the New York Jets, Keenum had a then career-high 377 passing yards, two touchdowns, and an interception in the 34–16 road loss.

During a Week 6 23–20 loss to his former team, the Rams, Keenum recorded 322 passing yards, two touchdowns, and an interception. In the next game against the Cardinals, he threw for 161 yards, a touchdown, and an interception during the 45–10 road victory. The following week against the Chiefs, Keenum had 262 passing yards, two touchdowns, and an interception in the 30–23 road loss.

During a Week 12 24–17 victory over the Pittsburgh Steelers, Keenum had 197 passing yards and two touchdowns. Three weeks later against the Browns, he threw for 257 yards and two interceptions and rushed for a touchdown in the narrow 17–16 loss.

The Broncos finished the 2018 season with a 6–10 record as Keenum recorded a career-high 3,890 passing yards, 18 touchdowns, and 15 interceptions to go along with 26 carries for 93 yards and two touchdowns in 16 games and starts.

=== Washington Redskins ===
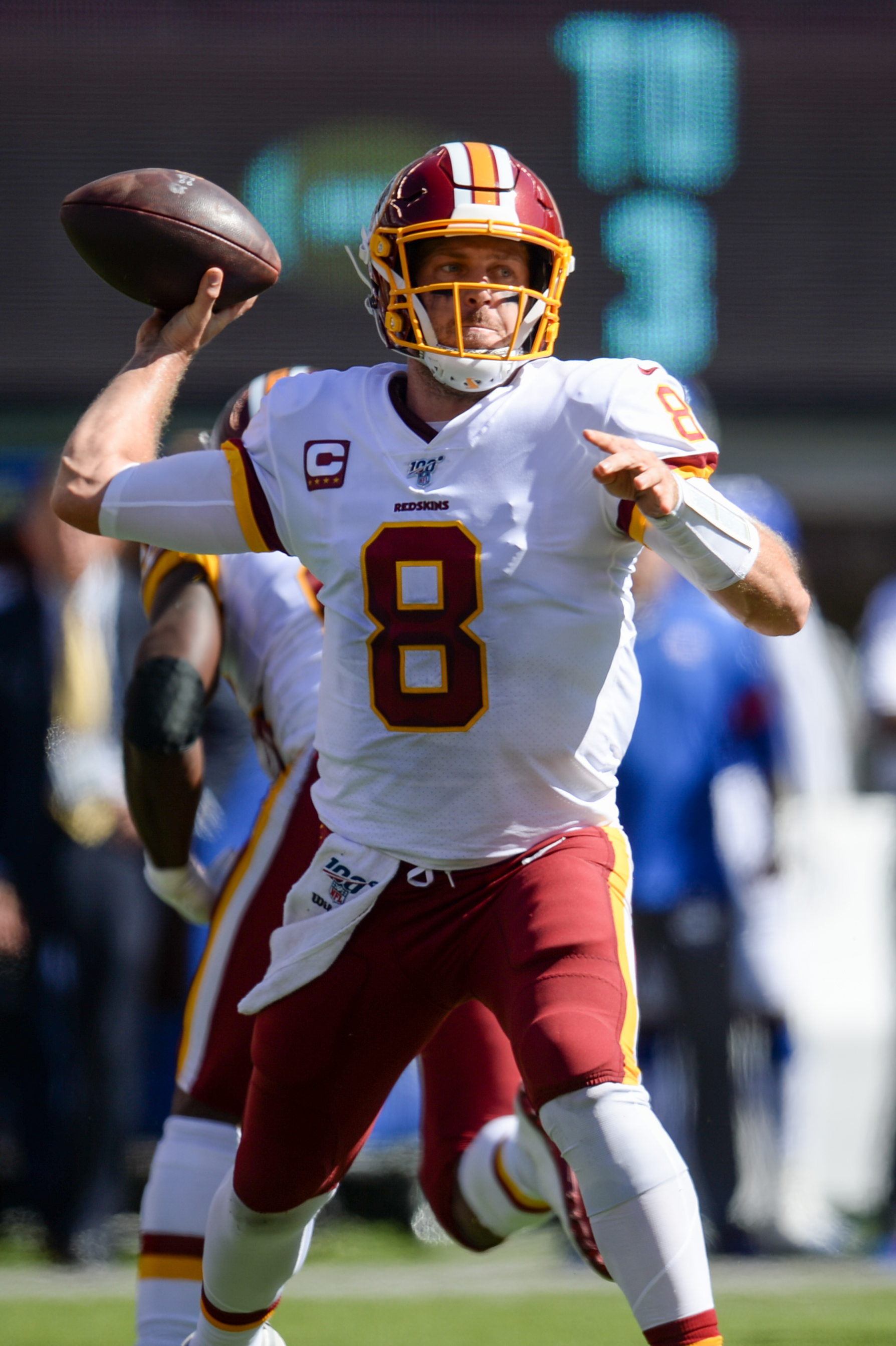
Keenum in 2019

On March 7, 2019, the Broncos agreed to trade Keenum and a seventh-round draft pick to the Redskins in exchange for a sixth-round draft pick. The deal became official six days later.

Keenum made his Redskins debut in the season-opener against the Eagles and finished the 32–27 road loss with a career-high 380 passing yards and three touchdowns. In the next game against the Cowboys, Keenum threw for 221 yards and two touchdowns during the 31–21 loss. The following week against the Chicago Bears on Monday Night Football, he had 332 passing yards, two touchdowns, and three interceptions, one of which was returned for a touchdown, in the 31–15 loss.

During a Week 4 24–3 road loss to the Giants, Keenum threw for 37 yards and an interception before being benched for rookie quarterback Dwayne Haskins in the second quarter. Two weeks later against the Miami Dolphins, Keenum threw for 166 yards and two touchdowns as the Redskins narrowly won their first game of the season on the road by a score of 17–16.

During a Week 8 19–9 road loss to his former team, the Minnesota Vikings, Keenum threw for 130 yards before being knocked out with a concussion. During Week 16 against the Giants, he entered the game in the third quarter after Haskins suffered an ankle injury. Keenum finished the 41–35 overtime loss with 158 passing yards and a touchdown to go along with a rushing touchdown. He remained the starter for the regular-season finale against the Cowboys and threw for 206 yards, a touchdown, and an interception during the 47–16 road loss.

Keenum finished the 2019 season with 1,707 passing yards, 11 touchdowns, and five interceptions to go along with nine carries for 12 yards and a touchdown in 10 games and eight starts.

=== Cleveland Browns ===
==== 2020 season ====
On March 24, 2020, Keenum signed a three-year, $18 million contract with the Cleveland Browns. He served as the backup quarterback to Baker Mayfield and made his Browns debut in Week 6 against the Steelers after Mayfield was pulled in the third quarter due to an aggravated rib injury. Keenum completed five of 10 passes for 46 yards over the course of three offensive drives during the 38–7 road loss.

==== 2021 season ====
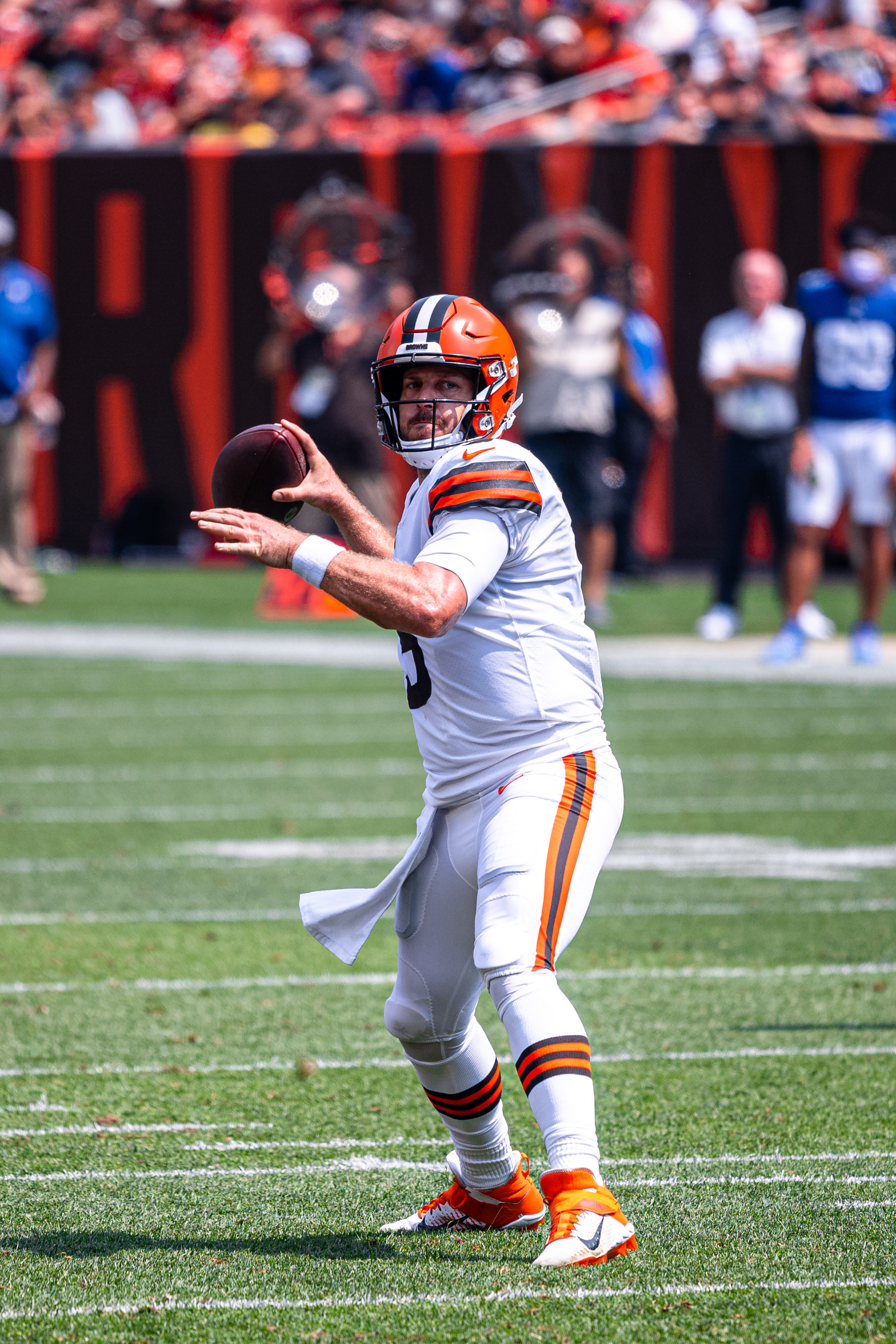
Keenum in 2021

On October 20, 2021, Keenum was named the starter for the Browns' Week 7 matchup against his former team, the Denver Broncos, due to a shoulder injury from Mayfield. It was his first start since Week 17 of the 2019 season. Keenum finished the 17–14 victory completing 21 of 33 passes for 199 yards and a touchdown. He also started in the season finale against the Bengals, throwing for 176 yards, two touchdowns, and an interception while also losing a fumble during the 21–16 victory.

=== Buffalo Bills ===
On March 20, 2022, Keenum was traded to the Buffalo Bills for a 2022 seventh-round pick. The trade also reunited Keenum with Stefon Diggs, his partner in the Minneapolis Miracle, who had been on the team since 2020.

=== Houston Texans (third stint) ===
==== 2023 season ====
On March 17, 2023, Keenum signed with the Texans on a two-year, $6.25 million contract.

After being listed the third-string quarterback for most of the season, Keenum was named the starter for the Week 15 matchup against the Tennessee Titans after starter C. J. Stroud was ruled out with a concussion. Keenum finished the 19–16 overtime road victory with 229 passing yards, a touchdown, and an interception. He started again the following week against his former team, the Browns, but got benched for Davis Mills in the second half after completing 11 of 17 passes for 62 yards and two interceptions as the Texans lost 36–22.

==== 2024 season ====
In 2024, Keenum and Stefon Diggs were once again reunited, as Diggs was traded to the Texans during the offseason. On August 27, 2024, Keenum was placed on injured reserve with a Lisfranc injury, ending his season before it started.

=== Chicago Bears ===
==== 2025 season ====
On April 3, 2025, Keenum signed a one-year deal worth up to $3 million with the Chicago Bears. Besides serving as a mentor to starter Caleb Williams, he competed with Tyson Bagent for the backup role during the offseason. Keenum ultimately served as the third-string quarterback for the season behind Williams and Bagent. He did not appear in any games during the 2025 season.

==== 2026 season ====
On March 9, 2026, Keenum signed a two-year, $5.5 million contract extension with the Bears. He remained the third-string quarterback after Williams and Bagent, though he was promoted to backup for the season opener while Bagent was out with a back injury.

After Williams and Bagent were injured during Week 2, Keenum was named the starter for the next game against the Philadelphia Eagles on Monday Night Football. Making his first start since 2023, Keenum finished the 27–7 victory completing 24-of-34 passes for 247 yards and two touchdowns while also rushing for six yards and a touchdown. At the age of 38 years and 223 days, he set age-based Bears records such as the oldest player to score a rushing touchdown, the oldest to throw for at least 200 yards in a game, and the oldest quarterback to throw for a touchdown. (Note: The oldest Bears player to record a passing touchdown is punter Mike Horan.) Keenum also became the second oldest quarterback in franchise history to win a start, trailing Todd Collins by 116 days. With the victory, Keenum won a game with seven different franchises, tying his former Texans teammate Ryan Fitzpatrick for the most in NFL history.

Keenum's performance prompted speculation on whether he or Bagent would start in Week 4 against the Jets. Reports eventually indicated Bagent would assume the role. However, Bears head coach Ben Johnson was displeased by the news breaking before he could announce it, and in response had both quarterbacks for the opening play. Keenum pitched the ball to D'Andre Swift and Bagent played for the rest of the 23–12 victory, a gesture that Johnson compared to a ceremonial first pitch. Since Keenum lined up at quarterback, he was credited with the start. Bagent started the following week against the Green Bay Packers, but was replaced by Keenum in the fourth quarter after struggling for most of the 31–7 road loss. Keenum threw for 108 yards and an interception while also losing a fumble.

== Career statistics ==
Legend
**Bold**	Career high

=== NFL ===
==== Regular season ====
Year	Team	Games			Passing									Rushing					Sacked		Fumbles	
Year	Team	GP	GS	Record	Cmp	Att	Pct	Yds	Y/A	Lng	TD	Int	Rtg	Att	Yds	Y/A	Lng	TD	Sck	Yds	Fum	Lost
2012	HOU	0	0	—	DNP																	
2013	HOU	8	8	0–8	137	253	54.2	1,760	7.0	66	9	6	78.2	14	72	**5.1**	**22**	1	19	201	6	2
2014	HOU	2	2	**2–0**	45	77	58.4	435	5.6	35	2	2	72.2	10	35	3.5	13	0	3	15	1	1
2015	STL	6	5	3–2	76	125	60.8	828	6.6	60	4	1	87.7	12	5	0.4	4	0	4	28	3	2
2016	LAR	10	9	4–5	196	322	60.9	2,201	6.8	65	9	11	76.4	20	51	2.6	13	1	23	140	5	1
2017	MIN	15	14	11–3	325	481	**67.6**	3,547	**7.4**	65	**22**	7	**98.3**	**40**	**160**	4.0	**22**	1	22	136	1	1
2018	DEN	16	16	6–10	**365**	**586**	62.3	**3,890**	6.6	64	18	**15**	81.2	26	93	3.6	17	**2**	**34**	**235**	**11**	2
2019	WAS	10	8	1–7	160	247	64.8	1,707	6.9	**69**	11	5	91.3	9	12	1.3	9	1	15	145	6	**3**
2020	CLE	2	0	—	5	10	50.0	46	4.6	24	0	0	62.9	0	0	—	0	0	0	0	0	0
2021	CLE	7	2	**2–0**	47	72	65.3	462	6.4	34	3	1	91.3	12	22	1.8	10	0	5	29	1	1
2022	BUF	2	0	—	2	7	28.6	8	1.1	5	0	0	39.6	5	0	0.0	4	0	0	0	0	0
2023	HOU	2	2	1–1	34	53	64.2	291	5.5	41	1	3	61.1	2	1	0.5	1	0	6	60	1	0
2024	HOU	0	0	—	Did not play due to injury																	
2025	CHI	0	0	—	DNP																	
2026	CHI	3	2	**2–0**	35	53	66.0	355	6.7	41	2	1	89.7	5	10	2.0	7	1	2	13	1	0
Career		83	68	32–36	1,427	2,286	62.4	15,530	6.8	69	81	52	84.7	155	461	3.0	22	7	133	1,002	36	13

==== Postseason ====
Year	Team	Games			Passing									Rushing					Sacked		Fumbles	
Year	Team	GP	GS	Record	Cmp	Att	Pct	Yds	Y/A	Lng	TD	Int	Rtg	Att	Yds	Y/A	Lng	TD	Sck	Yds	Fum	Lost
2012	HOU	0	0	—	DNP																	
2017	MIN	2	2	1–1	53	88	60.2	589	6.7	61	2	3	73.5	2	12	6.0	8	0	3	18	1	1
2020	CLE	0	0	—	DNP																	
2022	BUF	0	0	—	DNP																	
2023	HOU	0	0	—	DNP																	
2024	HOU	0	0	—	Did not play due to injury																	
2025	CHI	0	0	—	DNP																	
Career		2	2	1–1	53	88	60.2	589	6.7	61	2	3	73.5	2	12	6.0	8	0	3	18	1	1

=== College ===
Legend
NCAA record
Led the NCAA

Season	Team	Games			Passing							Rushing		
Season	Team	GP	GS	Record	Cmp	Att	Pct	Yds	TD	Int	Rtg	Att	Yds	TD
2006	Houston	Redshirt												
2007	Houston	13	7	4–3	187	273	68.5	2,259	14	10	147.6	**103**	**412**	**9**
2008	Houston	13	13	8–5	397	589	67.4	5,020	44	11	159.9	76	221	7
2009	Houston	14	14	10–4	**492**	**700**	70.3	**5,671**	44	**15**	154.8	60	158	4
2010	Houston	3	3	2–1	42	64	65.6	636	5	5	159.3	4	71	0
2011	Houston	14	14	**13–1**	428	603	**71.0**	5,631	**48**	5	**174.0**	57	35	3
Career		57	51	37–14	1,546	2,229	69.4	19,217	155	46	160.6	300	897	23

== Career highlights ==
Keenum accepting the 2009 College Football Performance Award

=== Awards and honors ===
NFL

- Ranked No. 51 in the Top 100 Players of 2018
- NFC Offensive Player of the Month (November 2017)
- NFL Moment of the Year (2017)

College

- 2× Sammy Baugh Trophy (2009, 2011)
- First-team All-American (2009)
- 2× NCAA passing yards leader (2009, 2011)
- 2× NCAA passing touchdowns leader (2009, 2011)
- 2× C-USA Most Valuable Player (2009, 2011)
- C-USA Offensive Player of the Year (2008)
- C-USA Freshman of the Year (2007)
- 2× First-team All-C-USA (2009, 2011)
- Second-team All-C-USA (2008)
- Houston Cougars No. 7 retired

=== NCAA records ===
As of November 9, 2024, Keenum holds the following NCAA individual records:

- Most career pass completions: 1,546
- Most career passing yards: 19,217
- Most career passing touchdowns: 155
- Most career games with 300+ passing yards: 39
- Most games with 300+ passing yards in a single season: 14 (tied with Tulsa's Paul Smith)
- Most seasons passing for 5,000+ yards: 3
- Most seasons passing for 4,000+ yards: 3 (tied with four others)
- Most career total yards: 20,114

== Personal life ==
Born in Brownwood, Texas, Keenum spent his childhood in Alpine, Texas, for a few years until moving to Abilene, Texas. His dad, Steve, served as an offensive lineman and later as head football coach and athletic director at McMurry University. The elder Keenum, known for an aggressive passing offensive strategy, was also head coach at Sul Ross State, offensive coordinator at Tarleton State, and offensive line coach at Hardin–Simmons.

Keenum and his wife, Kimberly, have two children.

In 2018, Keenum authored the book Playing for More with Andrew Perloff.

Keenum is a Christian, saying after the Minneapolis Miracle that the best moment of his life was giving his life to Jesus Christ.

In July 2020, Keenum became part-owner of Haak Winery in Santa Fe, Texas. He is also a supporter of Compassion International and their "Fill the Stadium" initiative.

== See also ==
- NCAA Division I FBS passing leaders
- NCAA Division I FBS total offense leaders
- List of NCAA major college football yearly passing leaders
- List of NCAA major college football yearly total offense leaders
