= List of NCAA major college football yearly receiving leaders =

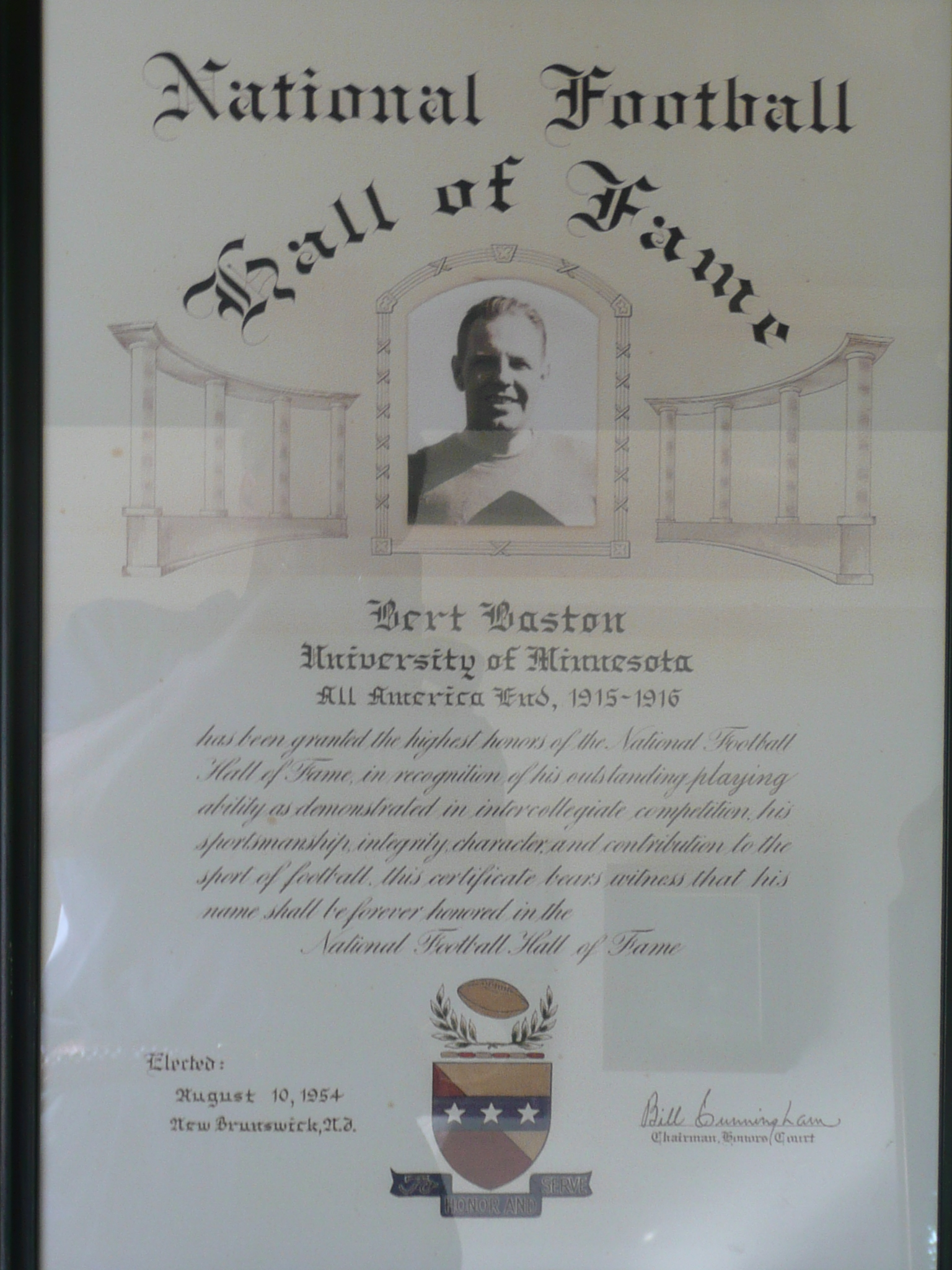
Bert Baston, the sport's first great pass catching end.

The list of college football yearly receiving leaders identifies the major college receiving leaders for each season from 1937 to the present. It includes yearly leaders in three statistical categories: (1) receptions, (2) receiving yardage; (3) yards per reception; and (4) receiving touchdowns.

Eleven players have led the NCAA in one or more of these categories in multiple seasons. They are: Reid Moseley of Georgia (1944–1945); Hugh Campbell of Washington State (1960–1961); Vern Burke of Oregon State (1962–1963); Howard Twilley of Tulsa (1964–1965); Ron Sellers of Florida State (1967–1968); Jerry Hendren of Idaho (1968–1969); Mike Siani of Villanova (1970–1971); Steve Largent of Tulsa (1974–1975); Jason Phillips of Houston (1987–1988); Alex Van Dyke of Nevada (1994–1995); and Brennan Marion of Tulsa (2007–2008).

Since 1937, the NCAA record for receiving yards in a single season has been set or broken nine times as follows: Jim Benton of Arkansas in 1937 (814 yards); Hank Stanton of Arizona in 1941 (820 yards); Ed Barker of Washington State 1951 (864 yards); Hugh Campbell of Washington State in 1960 (881 yards); Vern Burke of Oregon State in 1962 (1,007 yards); Fred Biletnikoff of Florida State in 1964 (1,179 yards); Howard Twilley of Tulsa in 1965 (1,779 yards); Alex Van Dyke of Nevada in 1995 (1,854 yards); and Trevor Insley of Nevada in 1999 (2,060 yards).

During that same time, the record for receptions in a single season has been set or broken 13 times as follows: Jim Benton of Arkansas in 1937 (48); Hank Stanton of Arizona in 1941 (50); Barney Poole of Ole Miss in 1947 (52); Ed Brown of Fordham in 1952 (57); Dave Hibbert of Arizona in 1958 (61); Hugh Campbell of Washington State in 1962 (69); Larry Elkins of Baylor in 1963 (70); Howard Twilley of Tulsa in 1964 (95) and 1965 (134); Manny Hazard of Houston in 1989 (142); Freddie Barnes of Bowling Green in 2009 (155); and Zay Jones of East Carolina in 2016 (158).

== Leading programs ==
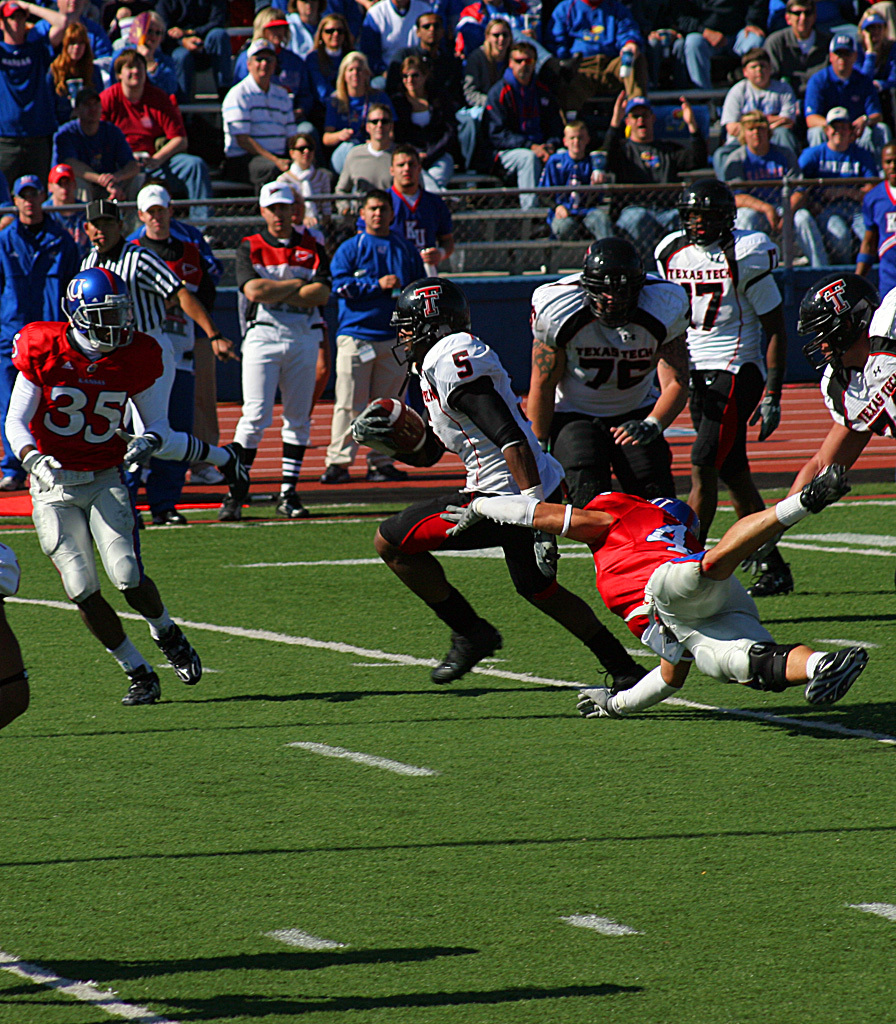
Michael Crabtree

Programs with multiple receiving leaders (at least three different individuals, in any of the four categories) include:

- Houston – 9 (Ken Hebert, Elmo Wright, Jason Phillips, Manny Hazard, Fred Gilbert, Sherman Smith, Ron Peters, Brandon Middleton, and Patrick Edwards)
- San Diego State – 7 (Tom Reynolds, Keith Denson, Dwight McDonald, Jim Sandusky, Patrick Rowe, Derrick Lewis, and J. R. Tolver)
- Louisiana Tech – 6 (Billy Ryckman, Rod Foppe, James Jordan, Troy Edwards, Trent Taylor, and Carlos Henderson)
- Tulsa – 6 (Keyarris Garrett, Brennan Marion, Chris Penn, Ronnie Kelley, Steve Largent, and Howard Twilley)
- Washington State – 5 (Ed Barker, Bill Steiger, Jack Fanning, Hugh Campbell, and Corey Alston)
- Baylor – 5 (Corey Coleman, Sam Boyd, Larry Elkins, Melvin Bonner, and Terrance Williams)
- BYU – 5 (Jay Miller, Clay Brown, Kirk Pendleton, Mark Bellini, and Austin Collie)
- Stanford – 5 (Bill McColl, Sam Morley, John Stewart, Chris Burford, and Devon Cajuste)
- Nevada – 5 (Bryan Reeves, Alex Van Dyke, Damond Wilkins, Trevor Insley, and Nate Burleson)
- Florida – 4 (Broughton Williams, Jack Jackson, Chris Doering, and Reidel Anthony)
- Florida State – 4 (Fred Biletnikoff, Ron Sellers, Barry Smith, and Snoop Minnis)
- Fresno State – 4 (Stephen Baker, Henry Ellard, Rodney Wright, and Davante Adams)
- Georgia – 4 (George Poschner, Reid Moseley, Johnny Carson, and Jimmy Orr)
- Hawaii – 4 (Ashley Lelie, Chad Owens, Davone Bess, and Greg Salas)
- Oklahoma State – 4 (Neill Armstrong, Justin Blackmon, Cecil Hankins, and James Washington)
- Oregon State – 4 (Vern Burke, Reggie Bynum, Mike Hass, and Brandin Cooks)
- Pitt – 4 (Dwight Collins, Julius Dawkins, Antonio Bryant, Larry Fitzgerald)
- Texas Tech – 4 (Elmer Tarbox, Earle Clark, Bake Turner, and Michael Crabtree)
- West Virginia – 4 (Stedman Bailey, Jay Kearney, Calvin Phillips, and David Sills V)
- Notre Dame – 3 (Bernard Kirk, Eddie Anderson, Jim Morse)
- Purdue – 3 (Dave Young, Rodney Carter, & Rondale Moore)
- Western Michigan – 3 (Greg Jennings, Corey Davis, & Jordan White)

== Receiving leaders from 1937 ==
Year	Receptions		Receiving yards		Yards per reception		Receiving TDs	
Year	Name	Rec	Name	Yds	Name	Avg	Name	TD
1937	Jim Benton (Arkansas)	48	Jim Benton	814	Walter Nelson (Michigan State)	21.6		
1938	Sam Boyd (Baylor)	32	Sam Boyd	537	Elmer Tarbox (Texas Tech)	21.4		
1939	Ken Kavanaugh (LSU)	30	Ken Kavanaugh	467	Earle Clark (Texas Tech)	17.3		
1940	Eddie Bryant (Virginia)	30	Don Vosberg (Marquette)	526	Don Vosberg	21.9		
1941	Hank Stanton (Arizona)	50	Hank Stanton	820	Lenny Krouse (Penn State)	16.8		
1942	Bill Rogers (Texas A&M)	39	Harding Miller (SMU)	531	George Poschner (Georgia)	20.5		
1943	Neill Armstrong (Oklahoma A&M)	39	Marion Flanagan (Texas A&M)	403	Marion Flanagan; Billy Collins (VMI)	17.5		
1944	Reid Moseley (Georgia)	32	Reid Moseley	506	Cecil Hankins (Oklahoma State)	24.9		
1945	Reid Moseley (Georgia); Gene Wilson (SMU); Steve Contos (Michigan State)	31	Reid Moseley	662	Reid Moseley	21.4		
1946	Neill Armstrong (Oklahoma State); James Montgomery (Arizona State)	32	Broughton Williams (Florida)	490	Broughton Williams	16.9		
1947	Barney Poole (Ole Miss)	52	John Smith (Arizona)	568	John Smith	18.3		
1948	Red O'Quinn (Wake Forest)	39	Red O'Quinn	605	Dick Wilkins (Oregon)	19.3		
1949	Art Weiner (North Carolina)	52	Vito Ragazzo (William & Mary)	793	Vito Ragazzo	18.0		
1950	Gordon Cooper (Denver)	46	Bucky Curtis (Vanderbilt)	791	Bucky Curtis	29.3		
1951	Dewey McConnell (Wyoming)	47	Ed Barker (Washington State)	864	Ed Barker	18.8		
1952	Ed Brown (Fordham)	57	Ed Brown	774	Jimmy Byron (VMI)	18.9		
1953	Johnny Carson (Georgia); Ken Buck (Pacific); Sam Morley (Stanford)	45	Johnny Carson	663	Dave McLaughlin (Dartmouth)	19.1		
1954	Jim Hanifan (California)	45	John Stewart (Stanford)	577	Andrew Nacrelli (Fordham)	19.7		
1955	Hank Burnine (Missouri)	44	Hank Burnine	594	Jimmy Orr (Georgia)	18.5		
1956	Art Powell (San Jose State)	40	Bill Steiger (Washington State)	607	Jim Morse (Notre Dame)	22.1	3-way tie	6
1957	Stuart Vaughan (Utah)	53	Stuart Vaughan	756	Buddy Dial (Rice)	24.2	Jack Fanning (Washington State)	9
1958	Dave Hibbert (Arizona)	61	Rich Kreitling (Illinois)	688	Rich Kreitling	29.9	Bob Simms (Rutgers)	9
1959	Chris Burford (Stanford)	61	Chris Burford (Pacific)	757	Bake Turner (Texas Tech)	20.2	Paul Maguire (The Citadel)	10
1960	Hugh Campbell (Washington State)	66	Hugh Campbell	881	Chuck Bryant; Ohio State	19.8	Hugh Campbell	10
1961	Hugh Campbell (Washington State)	53	Pat Richter (Wisconsin)	817	Jim Stewart; Navy	21.7	Larry Vargo (Detroit); Pat Richter	8
1962	Vern Burke (Oregon State)	69	Vern Burke	1007	Hal Bedsole (USC)	25.1	Hal Bedsole	11
1963	Larry Elkins (Baylor)	70	Larry Elkins	873	Paul Krause (Iowa)	23.3	Vern Burke (Oregon State); Bob Long (Wichita State)	9
1964	Howard Twilley (Tulsa)	95	Fred Biletnikoff (Florida State)	1179	Joe Chapman (Idaho)	25.4	Fred Biletnikoff	15
1965	Howard Twilley (Tulsa)	134	Howard Twilley	1779	Larry Seiple (Kentucky)	23.5	Howard Twilley	16
1966	Glenn Meltzer (Wichita State)	91	John Love (North Texas)	1130	Gene Washington (Michigan State)	25.1	Ken Hebert (Houston)	11
1967	Bob Goodridge (Vanderbilt)	79	Ron Sellers (Florida State)	1228	Mike Carroll (New Mexico State)	24.1	Ronnie Shanklin (North Texas)	13
1968	Ron Sellers (Florida State); Jerry Hendren (Idaho)	86	Ron Sellers (Florida State)	1496	Elmo Wright (Houston)	27.9	Jerry Hendren (Idaho)	14
1969	Jerry Hendren (Idaho)	95	Jerry Hendren	1452	Mel Gray (Missouri)	27.1	Tom Reynolds (San Diego State)	18
1970	Mike Mikolayunas (Davidson)	87	Mike Siani (Villanova)	1328	Larry Hart (Louisville)	24.1	Ernie Jennings (Air Force)	17
1971	Tom Reynolds (San Diego State)	67	Brian Baima (The Citadel)	1230	Tom Scott (Washington)	23.4	Mike Siani (Villanova)	14
1972	Tom Forzani (Utah State)	85	Barry Smith (Florida State)	1243	Richard Agle (Appalachian State)	25.2	Barry Smith; Steve Sweeney (California)	13
1973	Jay Miller (BYU)	100	Jay Miller	1181	Larry Stokes (Chattanooga)	27.9	Keith Denson (San Diego State)	11
1974	Dwight McDonald (San Diego State)	86	Willie Miller (Colorado State)	1193	Tracy Dickson (West Texas A&M)	26.8	Steve Largent (Tulsa)	14
1975	Dave Quehl (Holy Cross)	63	Steve Largent (Tulsa)	1000	Kelvin Kirk (Dayton)	24.5	Steve Largent	14
1976	Billy Ryckman (Louisiana Tech)	77	Billy Ryckman	1382	Jim Smith (Michigan)	27.5	4-way tie	10
1977	Wayne Tolleson (Western Carolina)	73	Rod Foppe (Louisiana Tech)	1274	Ernest Gray (Memphis)	29.5	3-way tie	12
1978	Rick Beasley (Appalachian State)	74	Rick Beasley	1205	Mark Nichols (San Jose State)	26.7	3-way tie	11
1979	Dave Petzke (Northern Illinois)	91	Dave Petzke	1215	Joe Burke (Chattanooga)	28.1	Gerald Lucear (Temple)	13
1980	Dave Young (Purdue)	70	Rainey Meszaros (Pacific)	1062	Dwight Collins (Pittsburgh)	27.6	Clay Brown (BYU)	15
1981	Tim Kearse (San Jose State)	71	Jim Sandusky (UNLV)	1346	Mike Whitwell (Texas A&M)	27.1	Julius Dawkins (Pittsburgh)	16
1982	Mike Martin (Illinois)	69	Henry Ellard (Fresno State)	1510	Herkie Walls (Texas)	28.1	Henry Ellard	15
1983	Keith Edwards (Vanderbilt)	97	Jim Sandusky (San Diego State)	1171	Reggie Bynum (Oregon State)	24.2	Kirk Pendleton (BYU)	11
1984	David Williams (Illinois)	101	David Williams	1278	Ronnie Kelley (Tulsa)	25.0	Doug Allen (Arizona State)	14
1985	Rodney Carter (Purdue)	98	Marc Zeno (Tulane)	1137	Stephen Baker (Fresno State)	29.1	Mark Bellini (BYU)	14
1986	Mark Templeton (Long Beach State)	99	Wendell Davis (LSU)	1244	Keith Gloster (Temple)	24.7	Andy Schillinger (Miami [OH])	12
1987	Jason Phillips (Houston)	99	Ernie Jones (Indiana)	1265	Willie Vaughn (Kansas)	26.9	Tommy Kane (Syracuse)	14
1988	Jason Phillips (Houston)	108	Jason Phillips	1444	Calvin Phillips (West Virginia)	25.5	Jason Phillips	15
1989	Manny Hazard (Houston)	142	Manny Hazard	1689	Randy Jackson (Rutgers)	28.5	Manny Hazard	22
1990	Eric Morgan (New Mexico)	80	Patrick Rowe (San Diego State)	1392	Bryan Rowley (Utah)	27.2	Tracey Jenkins (Utah State); Daryl Hobbs (Pacific)	14
1991	Fred Gilbert (Houston)	106	Aaron Turner (Pacific)	1604	Melvin Bonner (Baylor)	24.6	Desmond Howard (Michigan)	19
1992	Sherman Smith (Houston)	103	Ryan Yarborough (Wyoming)	1351	Ron Peters (Houston)	26.2	Sean Dawkins (California)	14
1993	Chris Penn (Tulsa)	105	Chris Penn	1578	Jay Kearney (West Virginia)	25.9	Bryan Reeves (Nevada); J. J. Stokes (UCLA)	17
1994	Alex Van Dyke (Nevada)	98	Marcus Harris (Wyoming)	1431	Jimmy Oliver (TCU)	23.8	Jack Jackson (Florida)	15
1995	Alex Van Dyke (Nevada)	129	Alex Van Dyke	1854	Terry Glenn (Ohio State)	22.0	Terry Glenn; Chris Doering (Florida)	17
1996	Damond Wilkins (Nevada)	114	Marcus Harris (Wyoming)	1650	Marcus Robinson (South Carolina)	24.0	Reidel Anthony (Florida)	18
1997	Eugene Baker (Kent State)	103	Randy Moss (Marshall)	1820	Corey Alston (Washington State)	23.8	Randy Moss	26
1998	Troy Edwards (Louisiana Tech)	140	Troy Edwards	1996	Kevin Coffey (Virginia)	25.3	Troy Edwards	27
1999	Trevor Insley (Nevada)	134	Trevor Insley	2060	André Davis (Virginia Tech)	25.5	Trevor Insley; James Williams (Marshall)	13
2000	James Jordan (Louisiana Tech)	109	Snoop Minnis (Florida State)	1340	Derrick Lewis (San Diego State)	25.2	Lee Mays (UTEP)	15
2001	Rodney Wright (Fresno State)	104	Josh Reed (LSU)	1740	Doug Gabriel (UCF)	28.7	Ashley Lelie (Hawaii)	19
2002	Nate Burleson (Nevada)	138	J. R. Tolver (San Diego State)	1785	Brandon Middleton (Houston)	24.1	Rashaun Woods (Oklahoma State)	17
2003	Lance Moore (Toledo)	103	Larry Fitzgerald (Pittsburgh)	1672	Dwight Counter (New Mexico); Lawrence Brady (Boise State)	25.0	Larry Fitzgerald	22
2004	Dante Ridgeway (Ball State)	105	Roddy White (UAB)	1452	Dan Sheldon (Northern Illinois)	23.4	Chad Owens (Hawaii)	17
2005	Greg Jennings (Western Michigan)	98	Mike Hass (Oregon State)	1532	Matt Miller (Arizona State)	23.5	Dwayne Jarrett (USC)	16
2006	Davone Bess (Hawaii)	96	Chris Williams (New Mexico State)	1425	Terry Moss (Ball State)	25.4	Jarett Dillard (Rice)	21
2007	Michael Crabtree (Texas Tech)	134	Michael Crabtree (Texas Tech)	1962	Brennan Marion (Tulsa)	31.9	Michael Crabtree (Texas Tech)	22
2008	Casey Fitzgerald (North Texas)	113	Austin Collie (BYU)	1538	Brennan Marion (Tulsa)	25.9	Jarett Dillard (Rice)	20
2009	Freddie Barnes (Bowling Green)	155	Danario Alexander (Missouri)	1781	Owen Spencer (NC State)	25.5	Freddie Barnes (Bowling Green)	19
2010	Ryan Broyles (Oklahoma)	131	Greg Salas (Hawaii)	1889	Kris Adams (UTEP)	22.8	Justin Blackmon (Oklahoma State)	20
2011	Jordan White (Western Michigan)	140	Jordan White (Western Michigan)	1911	Stephen Hill (Georgia Tech)	29.3	Patrick Edwards (Houston)	20
2012	Marqise Lee (USC)	118	Terrance Williams (Baylor)	1832	Willis Wright (FIU)	25.3	Stedman Bailey (West Virginia)	25
2013	Davante Adams (Fresno State)	131	Brandin Cooks (Oregon State)	1730	Devon Cajuste (Stanford)	22.9	Davante Adams (Fresno State)	24
2014	Amari Cooper (Alabama)	124	Rashard Higgins (Colorado State)	1750	Devin Smith (Ohio State)	28.2	Rashard Higgins (Colorado State)	18
2015	Tajae Sharpe (UMass)	111	Keyarris Garrett (Tulsa)	1588	Mack Hollins (North Carolina)	24.8	Corey Coleman (Baylor)	20
2016	Zay Jones (East Carolina)	158	Trent Taylor (Louisiana Tech)	1803	Jalen Robinette (Air Force)	27.4	Corey Davis (Western Michigan) & Carlos Henderson (Louisiana Tech)	19
2017	Trey Quinn (SMU)	114	James Washington (Oklahoma State)	1549	Aaron Cephus (Rice)	24.9	Anthony Miller (Memphis) & David Sills V (West Virginia)	18
2018	Rondale Moore (Purdue)	114	Andy Isabella (UMass)	1698	Xavier Ubosi (UAB)	23.9	John Ursua (Hawaii)	16
2019	Justin Jefferson (LSU); James Proche (SMU)	111	Ja'Marr Chase (LSU)	1780	Geraud Sanders (Air Force)	24.87	Ja'Marr Chase (LSU)	20
2020	DeVonta Smith (Alabama)	117	DeVonta Smith (Alabama)	1,856	D'Wayne Eskridge (Western Michigan)	23.1	DeVonta Smith (Alabama)	23
2021	Jerreth Sterns (Western Kentucky)	150	Jerreth Sterns (Western Kentucky)	1,902	Trea Shropshire (UAB)	26.0	Jordan Addison (Pittsburgh) & Jerreth Sterns (Western Kentucky)	17
2022	Charlie Jones (Purdue)	110	Tank Dell (Houston)	1,398	Trea Shropshire (UAB)	22.5	Tank Dell (Houston)	17
2023	Malik Washington (Virginia)	110	Rome Odunze (Washington)	1,640	Chris Lewis (Troy)	23.0	Brian Thomas Jr. (LSU)	17
2024	Harold Fannin Jr. (Bowling Green)	117	Harold Fannin Jr. (Bowling Green)	1,555	Dont'e Thornton (Tennessee)	25.4	Nick Nash (San Jose State)	16
2025	Malachi Toney (Miami [FL])	109	Danny Scudero (San Jose State)	1,297	Deondre Johnson (Jacksonville State)	24.1	Elijah Sarratt (Indiana)	15

== Pre-1937 unofficial data ==
Before 1937 the NCAA did not compile official statistics. This chart reflects unofficial receiving statistics compiled by historians mostly from newspapers accounts.

Year	Name	Rec	Name	Rec Yds	Name	Yds/Rec	Name	Rec TD
1915	Bert Baston (Minnesota)							
1916	Bert Baston (Minnesota)							
1917								
1918	Bernard Kirk (Notre Dame)	7						
1919	Bernard Kirk (Notre Dame)	21	Bernard Kirk	372				
1920	Eddie Anderson (Notre Dame)	17	Eddie Anderson	293				
1921	Eddie Anderson (Notre Dame)	26	Eddie Anderson	394				
1922								
1923								
1924								
1925							Myles Lane (Dartmouth)	7
1926								
1927								
1928								
1929	Wear Schoonover (Arkansas)	33						
1930								
1931								
1932								
1933								
1934	Don Hutson (Alabama)	19						
1935								
1936	Jim Benton (Arkansas)	35						
