= Hank Stanton =

American football player (1920–1975)

No. 42
- Position: End

Personal information
- Born: August 24, 1920; Haskell, Texas, U.S.
- Died: April 11, 1975 (aged 54); Phoenix, Arizona, U.S.
- Listed height: 6 ft 2 in (1.88 m)
- Listed weight: 200 lb (91 kg)

Career information
- High school: Clifton (Clifton, Arizona)
- College: Arizona (1939–1941)

Career history

Playing
- New York Yankees (1946–1947)

Coaching
- Arizona State (1949–1951) Freshman, JV, ends coach; Arizona (1952–1954) Ends coach

Awards and highlights
- NCAA receiving leader (1941); NCAA single-season record, 820 rec. yds. (1941–1951); NCAA single-season record, 50 rec. (1941–1947)

Henry R. Stanton (August 24, 1920 – March 11, 1975) was an American football player and coach.

Stanton was born in Haskell, Texas, in 1920. His family moved to Arizona, eventually settling in Clifton, Arizona. He attended Clifton High School. He played college football for the Arizona Wildcats football team from 1939 to 1941 and professional football for the New York Yankees of the All-America Football Conference (AAFC) from 1946 to 1947. In 1941, he set two NCAA receiving records with 50 receptions and 820 receiving yards in a single season. During the 1941, Stanton played on both offense and defense, appearing in 447 of 600 minutes in Arizona's ten-game schedule. He received Little All-America and All-Border Conference honors at the end of the 1941 season. His playing career was interrupted by service in the U.S. Army in Europe during World War II.

After the war, appeared in 15 games with the Yankees at end during the 1946 and 1947 seasons. He caught two passes for the Yankees.

In 1949, Stanton joined football coaching staff at Arizona State College—now known as Arizona State University—initially as the freshman and junior varsity coach. He later became Arizona State's ends coach. In December 1951, He resigned his position at Arizona State, effective at the end of his contract on July 1, 1952. In February 1952, Stanton was hired as ends coach at his alma mater, the University of Arizona. He retired from that position in April 1955 to take a job with the sales department of the Arizona Portland Cement Co. in Phoenix.

In 1969, on the 100th anniversary of college football, Stanton was selected by the Football Writers Association of America (FWAA) to the all-time Rocky Mountain-Southwest football team. In announcing his selection, Stanton was credited as "a strong defensive player."

Stanton died in April 1975 of an apparent heart attack at age 54.

== See also ==
- List of NCAA major college football yearly receiving leaders
