= Dave Hibbert =

Dave Hibbert may refer to:

- David Hibbert (born 1986), English footballer
- Dave Hibbert (American football) (1938–2009), American football player

== See also ==
- Dave Hibberd (born 1965), South African sailor
