= Park Avenue Bridge =

Park Avenue Bridge may refer to:

- Park Avenue Bridge (Clifton, Arizona), listed on the NRHP in Arizona
- Park Avenue Bridge (New York City), an alternative name for the Harlem River Lift Bridge
- Park Avenue Viaduct, in New York City
