= List of Davidson Wildcats in the NFL draft =

This is a list of Davidson Wildcats players in the NFL draft.

== Key ==
B	Back	K	Kicker	NT	Nose tackle
C	Center	LB	Linebacker	FB	Fullback
DB	Defensive back	P	Punter	HB	Halfback
DE	Defensive end	QB	Quarterback	WR	Wide receiver
DT	Defensive tackle	RB	Running back	G	Guard
E	End	T	Offensive tackle	TE	Tight end

== Selections ==
Year	Round	Pick	Player	Team	Position
1950	12	152	Bob Sharpe	Chicago Cardinals	G
1961	19	261	Tom Simpson	San Francisco 49ers	OT
1970	7	174	Gordon Slade	Baltimore Colts	QB
1971	14	364	Mike Mikolayunas	Baltimore Colts	RB
