= Clifton Unified School District =

Defunct school district in Greenlee County, Arizona

The Clifton Unified School District was the school district in Clifton, Arizona. It contained two schools, Laugharn Elementary School and Clifton High School until the closing of the district in 2010.

== Clifton High School ==
Up until September 2010, it also operated Clifton High School (colors maroon and gold, mascot the Trojans). The state of Arizona hinted it would petition for its closure in late spring, because it was labeled as a "failing school" and not meeting progress benchmarks in federal law and on the Arizona's Instrument to Measure Standards statewide exam; it followed through at a meeting in late August 2010. The small high school also lost a science and mathematics teacher (one of its three remaining teachers) when he resigned for health reasons – the school district was unable to allow students to travel to Morenci to take the classes at Morenci Junior/Senior High School, four miles away in nearby Morenci, Arizona. Superintendent Evonne Hanna and the Clifton school board allowed students to begin attending another school via state open enrollment laws, in most all cases Morenci High.
