= Morenci mine =

Copper mine in Greenlee County, Arizona, United States

Coordinates: 33°05′26″N 109°22′00″W

Morenci Mine
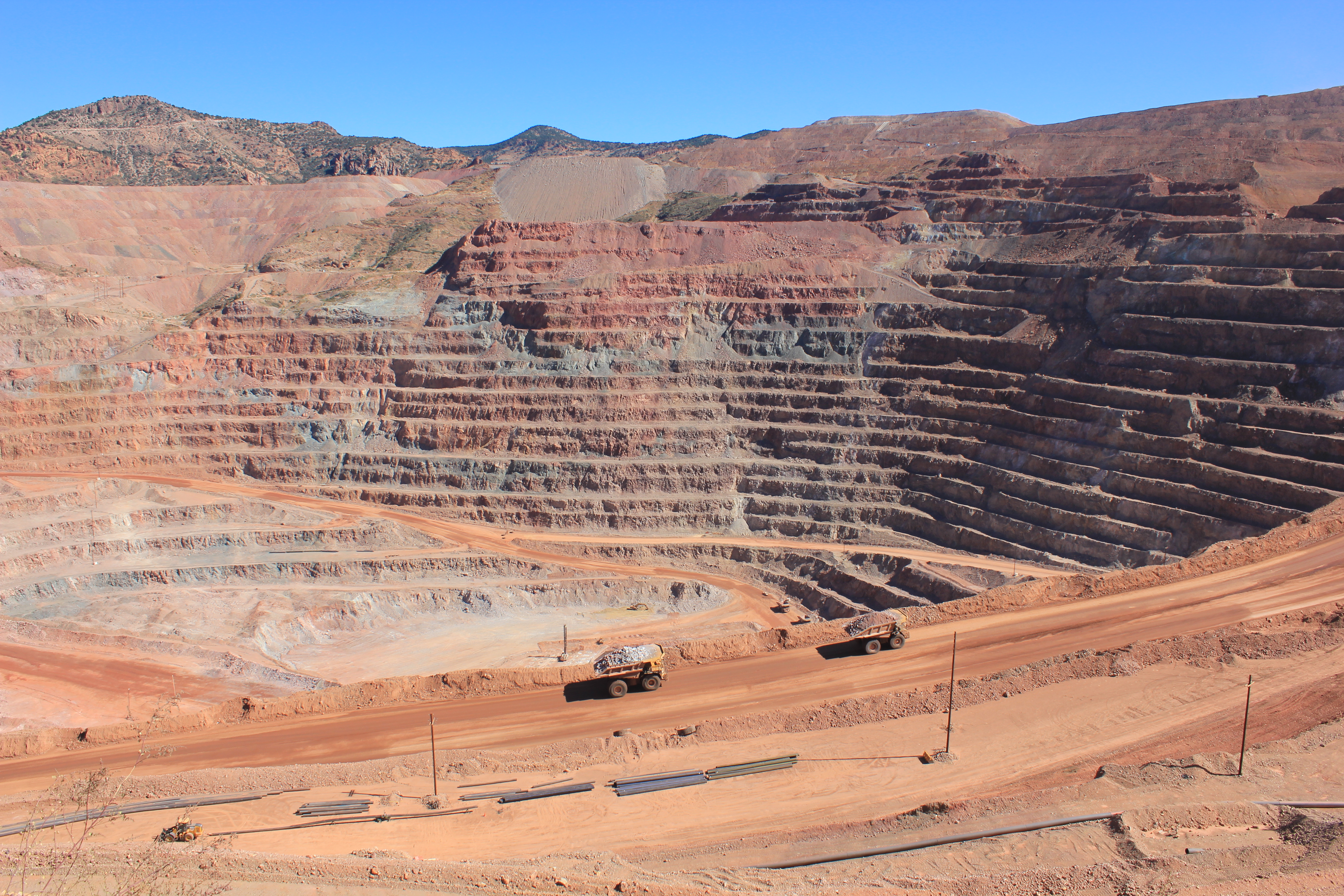
- Morenci Mine 2012
- Interactive map of Morenci Mine
- Location: Greenlee County, Arizona, United States
- Products: Copper
- Company: Freeport-McMoRan and Sumitomo Metal Mining
- Website: www.fcx.com/operations/north-america

The Morenci Mine is a large copper mine located near Morenci, Arizona, United States. Morenci represents one of the largest copper reserves in the United States and in the world, having estimated reserves of 3.2 billion tonnes (3.5×10^{9} short tons) of ore grading 0.16% copper. It is located in Greenlee County, just outside the company town of Morenci and the town of Clifton. Freeport-McMoRan is the principal owner and, since 2016, Sumitomo Group has owned a 28% interest in the mine.

== Production ==
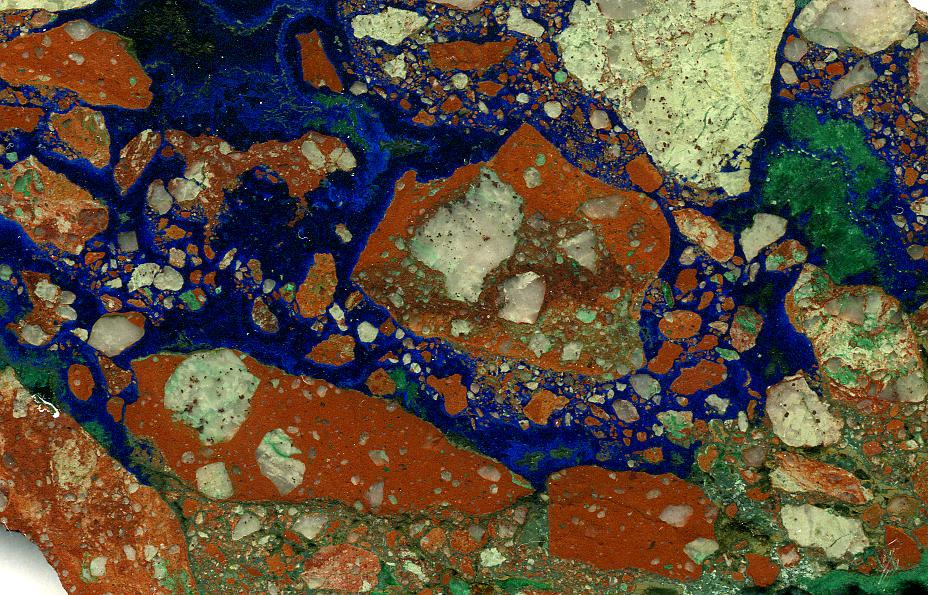
Breccia cemented by malachite and azurite, Morenci Mine

In 2016, copper production at Morenci was 848 million pounds (385,000,000 kg). In 2017, copper production at Morenci was 737 million pounds (334,000,000 kg). 3,300 people were employed there. As production declined, it was estimated in 2023 that the mine would be exhausted in 20 years.

The mine is served by the Freeport-McMoRan Industrial Railroad, which interchanges with Arizona Eastern Railway in Clifton. The railroad is used to bring chemicals (primarily sulfuric acid) to the mine, as well as ship out copper concentrate.

== History ==
The mine was established as an underground mine in 1871 by the Longfellow Mining Company and was converted into an open-pit mine by the Phelps Dodge Corporation starting in 1937. The earliest operations at Morenci Mine, then called the Longfellow Mine, used mules to transport ore carts.

In April 2012, the U.S. Department of Justice announced that Freeport McMoran agreed to pay $6.8 million to settle federal and state charges pertaining to the outflow of acidic metal bearing waters from the Morenci Mine. According to the complaint, waters, soils, habitats, and birds were either injured or lost as a result of the hazardous substances.

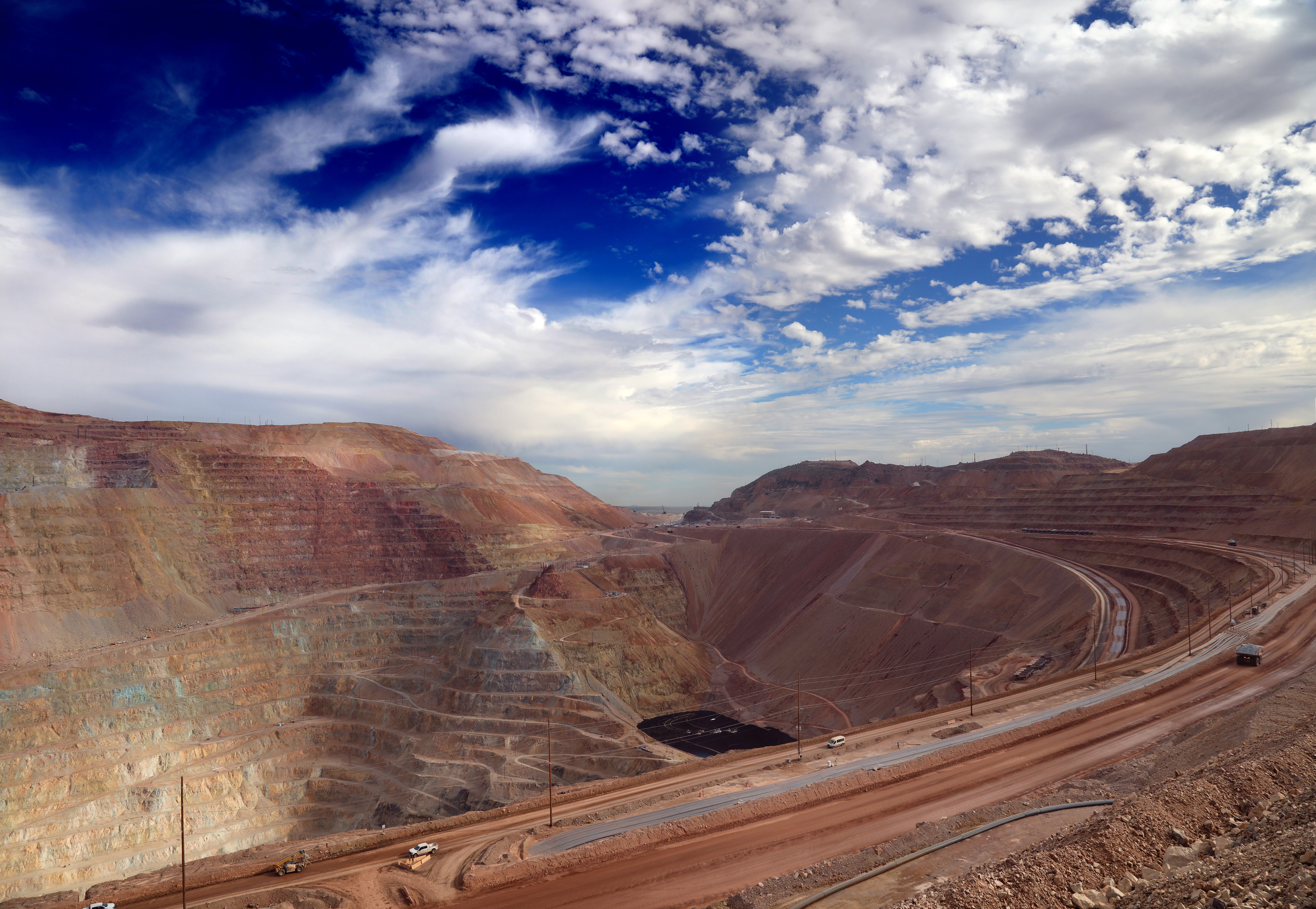
The Morenci Mine, Arizona

=== Labor Disputes ===
The Morenci Mine has had a long history of labor disputes between mine workers and the various companies that have operated it.

One of the earliest strikes at Morenci was in 1903, when workers, who were predominantly of Mexican descent and not represented by a union at the time due to opposition from the then-predominantly white Western Federation of Miners, went on strike for higher wages. The strike ended when a flash flood destroyed many of the miners' homes and caused 40–50 deaths, prior to an anticipated confrontation between strikers and the U.S. Cavalry.

The Morenci Mine was also central in the historic Arizona mine strike of 1983. From 1983 to 1986, workers at Morenci and three other mines went on strike due to layoffs impacting most of the workers at the mine following a large drop in the price of copper. Following the hiring of strikebreakers by Phelps-Dodge, striking union workers blocked the entrance to the mine, and engaged in sometimes violent confrontations with the strikebreakers. The early days of the strike involved large-scale armed intervention from the Arizona National Guard and Department of Public Safety, including armored vehicles and sharpshooters. In 1984, workers at Morenci began voting to decertify the unions. The strike of 1983 completely failed in 1986 after the NLRB rejected appeals by the unions to halt the decertification.

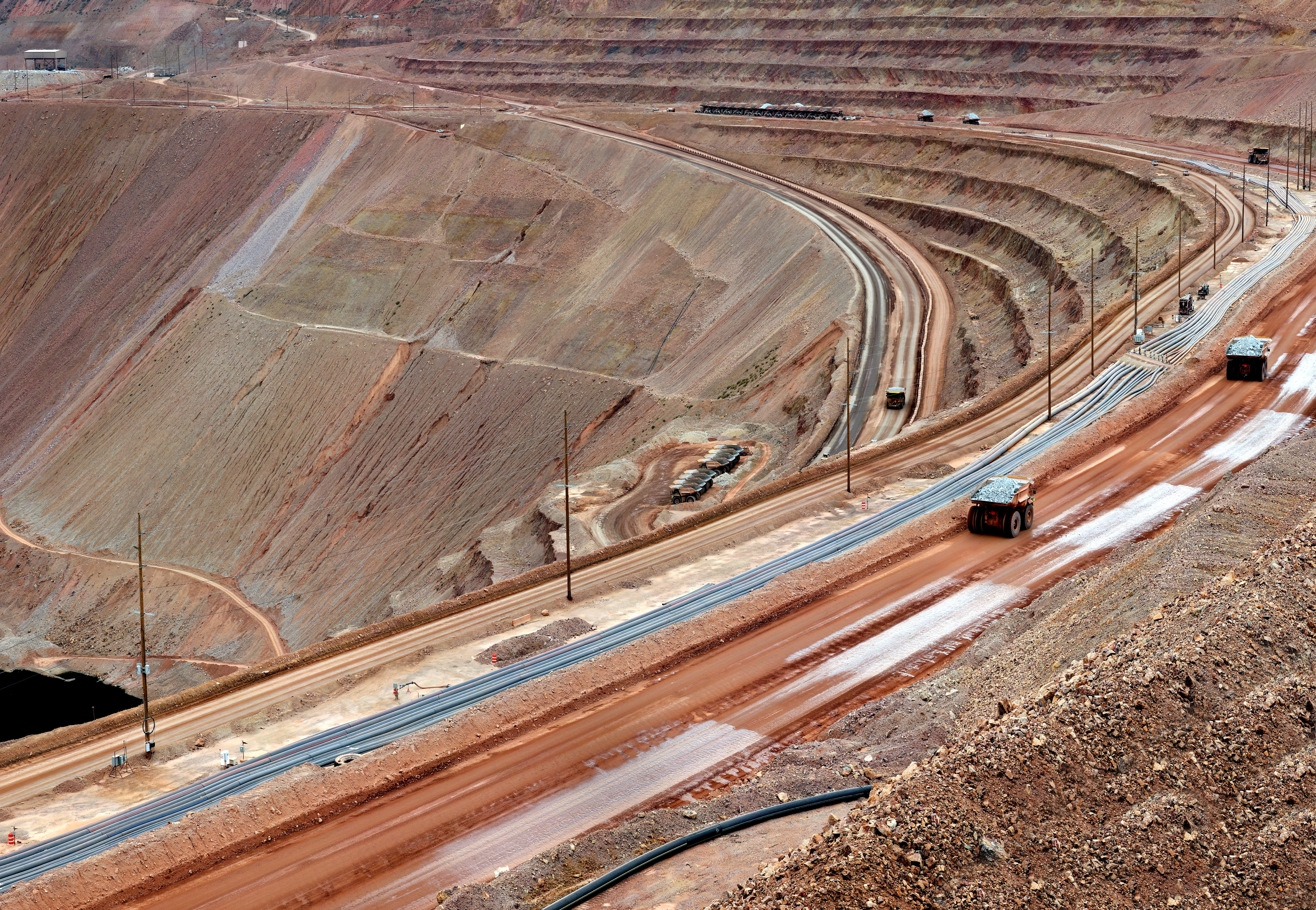
Morenci Mine, Arizona 2022

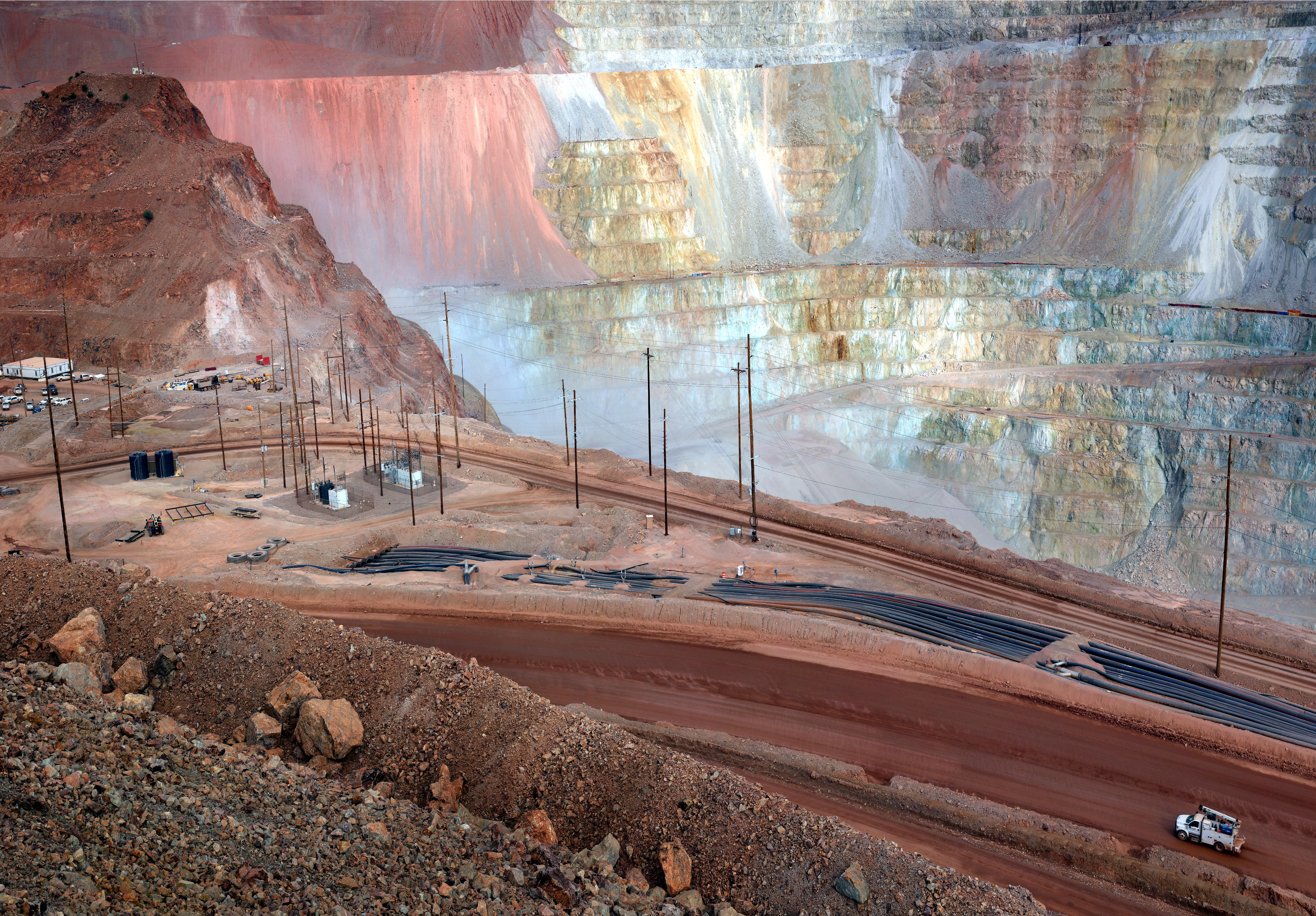
Morenci Mine, Arizona 2022

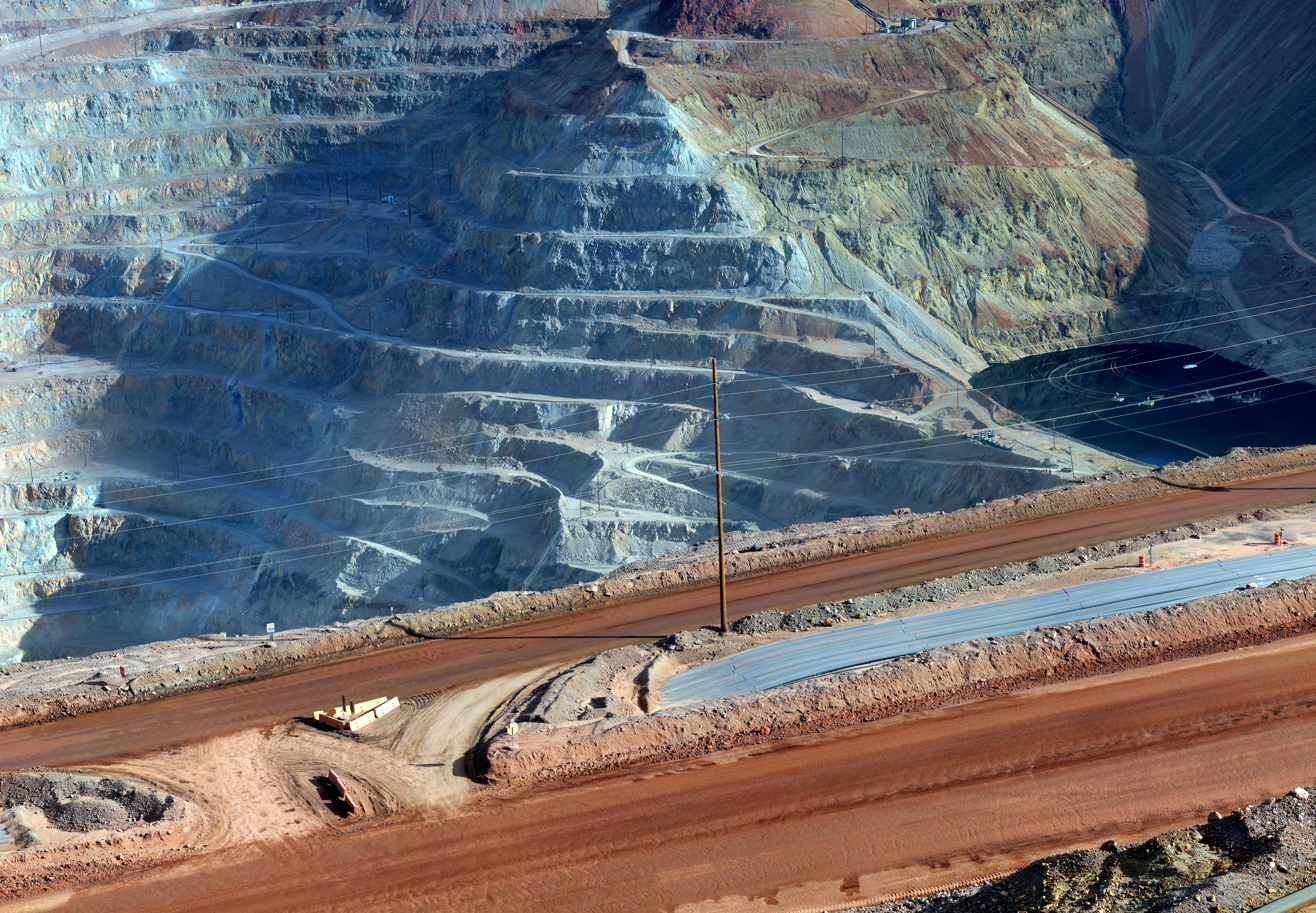
A view of the Morenci Mine, Arizona 2022
