= Clifton Townsite Historic District =

Historic district in Arizona, United States

- U.S. National Register of Historic Places
- U.S. Historic district
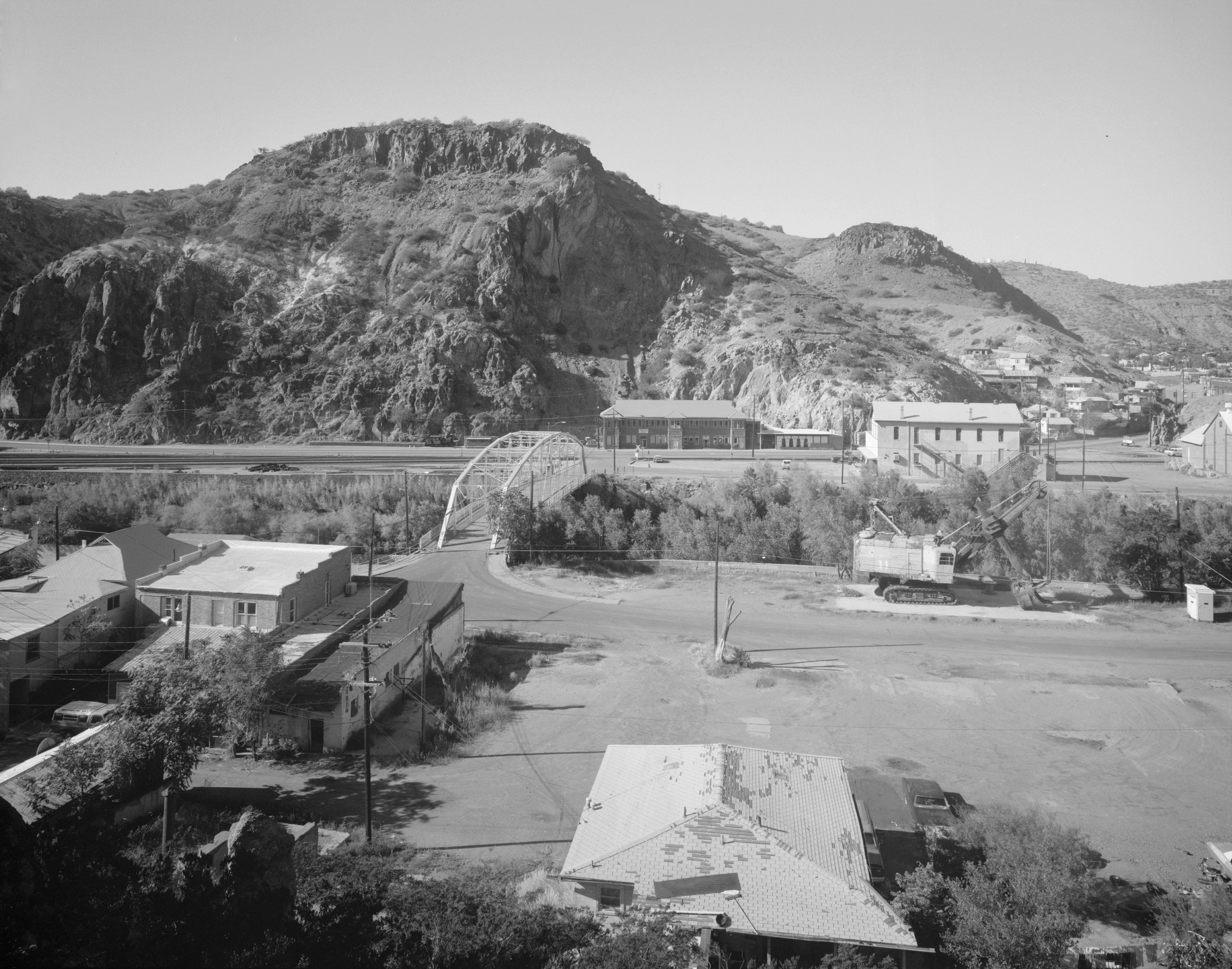

- Location within Arizona Location within the United States
- Location: Confluence of Chase Creek and the San Francisco River, Clifton, Arizona
- Area: 37 acres (15 ha)
- Architectural style: Prairie School, Late Victorian, Mission/spanish Revival
- NRHP reference No.: 90000339
- Added to NRHP: March 1, 1990

The Clifton Townsite Historic District, in Clifton, Arizona, is a 37-acre (15 ha) historic district that was listed on the National Register of Historic Places in 1990.

It is historically significant as "a largely intact area within Clifton, a copper mining town in eastern Arizona which developed between 1870 and 1930. The district is significant...for its association with the early copper mining and smelting operations in that region and with the town which grew to support those operations; it is additionally significant...for its intact examples of architecture typical of Arizona's mining towns of the day."

It is located at the confluence of Chase Creek and the San Francisco River. The Park Avenue Bridge over the San Francisco River, and the Clifton Casa Grande Building, which are both individually listed on the National Register, are included in the district.

The district includes Prairie School, Late Victorian, and Mission/Spanish Revival architecture. The district includes 41 contributing buildings, two contributing sites, and nine contributing structures.

== See also ==
- National Register of Historic Places listings in Greenlee County, Arizona
