= Reid Moseley =

American football player (1924–1994)

Profile
- Position: End

Personal information
- Born: August 10, 1924; Newnan, Georgia, U.S.
- Died: February 26, 1994 (aged 69); Greensboro, North Carolina, U.S.
- Listed height: 6 ft 0 in (1.83 m)
- Listed weight: 163 lb (74 kg)

Career information
- High school: Huntsville (Huntsville, Alabama); Castle Heights Military Academy (Lebanon, Tennessee)
- College: Georgia (1944–1945)

Awards and highlights
- 2× NCAA receiving leader (1944, 1945); First-team All-SEC (1945); Second-team All-SEC (1944)

Oscar Reid Moseley Jr. (August 10, 1924 – February 26, 1994) was an American college football player.

Moseley was born in 1924 in Newnan, Georgia. He attended Huntsville High School in Alabama and Castle Heights Military Academy.

Moseley attended the University of Georgia where he earned varsity letters in basketball, track and field, tennis, and football. He was captain of Georgia's basketball team and was also the inter-fraternity diving champion. He played football for the Bulldogs for four years from 1943 to 1946. In 1944, he led the country with 32 receptions and 506 receiving yards. In 1945, he led the country in all three major receiving categories: 31 receptions; 662 receiving yards; and 21.4 yards per reception. With his 1945 performance, Moseley became the first player in NCAA history to lead the nation in all three receiving categories.

Moseley was drafted by the Chicago Bears in the seventh round (55th overall pick) of the 1947 NFL draft. He was released by the Bears and was later signed and released by the Pittsburgh Steelers in 1949. He played for the Erie Vets during the 1949 season.

After his playing career ended, Moseley became a teacher and coach at Riverside Military Academy (Georgia, three years), St. Augustine High School (Florida, three years), South Hambersham High School (Georgia, three years), and Lafayette High School (Georgia, three years). In 1966, he was hired as the head football coach and athletic director at Hargrave Military Academy in Chatham, Virginia. He concluded his coaching career at Page High School in Greensboro, North Carolina.

Moseley was married to Betty Jane Wood, a former Miss Georgia. He died in 1994, at age 69, at Silver Pointe Health Care Center. .

== See also ==
- List of NCAA major college football yearly receiving leaders
