= Glenn Meltzer =

Former American football wide receiver

- Meltzer from 1968 Wichita State yearbook

Profile
- Position: Wide receiver

Personal information
- Born: c. 1947

Career information
- College: Wichita State (1966–1968)

Awards and highlights
- Led NCAA in receptions (1966); First-team All-Missouri Valley Conference (1966)

Glenn Meltzer (born c. 1947) was an American football wide receiver. He played college football for the Wichita State Shockers from 1966 to 1966. As a sophomore in 1966, he led the NCAA with 91 receptions and ranked second with 1,115 receiving yards in nine games. He was selected by the Associated Press as a first-team end on the 1966 All-Missouri Valley Conference football team. Meltzer never again achieved the output of the 1966 season, tallying 333 receiving yards in 1966 and 127 receiving yards in 1968.

== See also ==
- List of NCAA major college football yearly receiving leaders
