= Park Avenue Bridge (Clifton, Arizona) =

- U.S. National Register of Historic Places
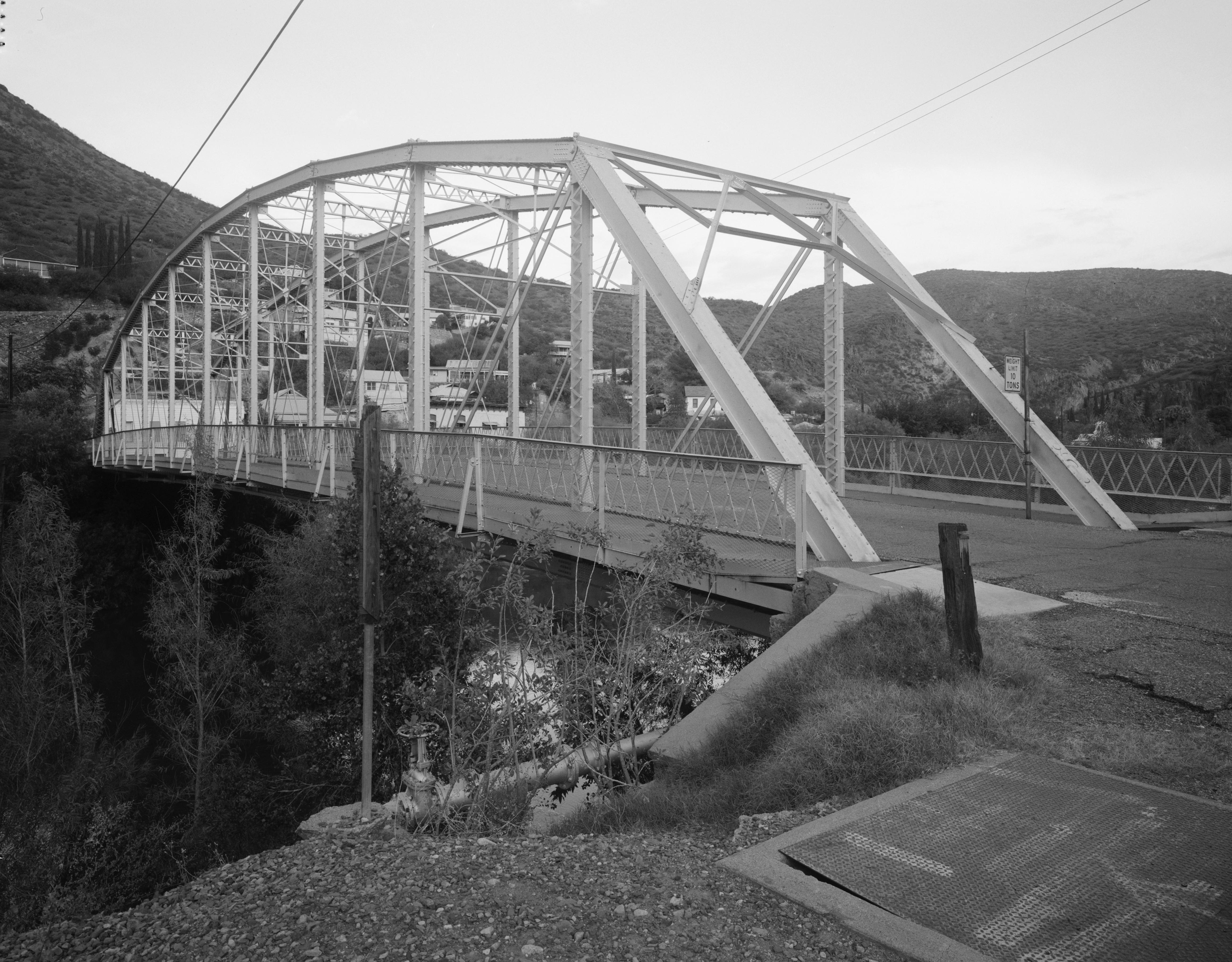

- Location within Arizona Location within the United States
- Location: Park Ave. over the San Francisco River, Clifton, Arizona
- Coordinates: 33°3′22″N 109°17′55″W
- Area: 0.1 acres (0.040 ha)
- Built: 1917-18
- Built by: Midland Bridge Co.; Illinois Steel Co.
- Architectural style: Through Truss Bridge
- MPS: Vehicular Bridges in Arizona MPS
- NRHP reference No.: 88001661
- Added to NRHP: September 30, 1988

The Park Avenue Bridge in Clifton, Arizona brings Park Avenue over the San Francisco River and was long the one link between east and west sides of the town. It is a historic through truss bridge, built during 1917–18, and is listed on the U.S. National Register of Historic Places. It has also been known as Clifton Bridge and as Riley Bridge.

It is significant historically as the only pinned Parker vehicular truss in the state of Arizona. At the time of its NRHP listing, in 1988, it was in original condition including having a creosoted timber deck.

It was individually listed on the National Register of Historic Places (NRHP) in 1988. It was also included as a contributing structure within the Clifton Townsite Historic District, a historic district listed on the NRHP in 1990.
