= James Jordan (American football) =

American football player (born 1978)

No. 5,18
- Position: Wide receiver

Personal information
- Born: June 11, 1978 (age 48); Los Angeles, California, U.S.
- Listed height: 6 ft 2 in (1.88 m)
- Listed weight: 240 lb (109 kg)

Career information
- High school: Alfred Bonnabel (Kenner, Louisiana)
- College: Louisiana Tech
- NFL draft: 2001: undrafted

Career history
- San Francisco 49ers (2001–2004); New Orleans VooDoo (2005); Kansas City Brigade (2006–2007); New Orleans VooDoo (2007–2008); Bossier-Shreveport Battle Wings (2010); New Orleans VooDoo (2011)

Awards and highlights
- NCAA Division I-A leader in receptions (2000)

Career NFL statistics
- Games played: 7
- Tackles: 3
- Stats at Pro Football Reference

Career AFL statistics
- Receptions: 388
- Receiving yards: 4,106
- Touchdowns: 82
- Stats at ArenaFan.com

James Robert Jordan III (born June 11, 1978) is an American former professional football player who was a wide receiver for the San Francisco 49ers of the National Football League (NFL) from 2001 to 2004. He played college football for the Louisiana Tech Bulldogs. He also player professionally in the Arena Football League from 2005 to 2011.

Jordan went to high school in Kenner, Louisiana. At Louisiana Tech, Jordan was the NCAA Division I-A leader in receptions. Following the 2001 NFL draft, he was signed by the San Francisco 49ers as an undrafted free agent. After three seasons with the 49ers, Jordan played in the Arena Football League for six seasons, for the Kansas City Brigade in 2006 and 2007, New Orleans VooDoo in 2007 and 2008, Bossier-Shreveport Battle Wings in 2010, and again with the VooDoo in 2011. While his playing time in the NFL was mostly on special teams, Jordan had over 4,000 yards and 80 touchdowns as a receiver in the Arena Football League.

== Early life and college career ==
Born in Los Angeles, Jordan graduated from Alfred Bonnabel High School in Kenner, Louisiana in 1997. At Louisiana Tech University, after redshirting the 1997 season, Jordan played at wide receiver for the Louisiana Tech Bulldogs from 1998 to 2000. Jordan had 246 receptions for 2,489 yards, tied for third in total receptions in Louisiana Tech history. His 19 receiving touchdowns were also fourth in program history. In his senior year of 2000, Jordan was the NCAA Division I-A leader in receptions with 109; he had 1,003 receiving yards and four touchdowns that year.

== Professional career ==
=== San Francisco 49ers (2001–2004) ===
After the 2001 NFL draft, Jordan signed with the San Francisco 49ers on April 23, 2001, reuniting with college teammate Tim Rattay. He participated in training camp and all four preseason games before being waived on August 28.

Jordan re-signed with the 49ers on January 30, 2002. He was placed on the practice squad before being activated on October 14 and making his NFL debut the same day in a 28–21 win at the Seattle Seahawks. In the 2002 season, Jordan played in six games on special teams, recording two tackles before being waived on December 3.

Signing with the 49ers practice squad on October 29, Jordan was signed to the active roster on December 24 to replace the injured Terrell Owens. He had a special teams tackle in the December 27 season finale.

Following an injury, Jordan was released by the 49ers on April 27, 2004.

=== Arena football (2005–2011) ===
Jordan signed with the New Orleans VooDoo of the Arena Football League on October 28, 2004. He was placed on injured reserve on May 13, 2005, and signed again on June 20, but he did not appear in any games in 2005.

In 2006, Jordan had a breakout season for the Kansas City Brigade, with 69 receptions for 797 yards and 14 touchdowns.

Jordan played in the first two games of 2007 with the Brigade before signing with the New Orleans VooDoo, where he played in eight games. With the VooDoo in 2007, Jordan had 60 receptions for 569 yards and nine touchdowns. The following year with the VooDoo, Jordan reached career highs as a receiver in catches (115), yards (1,307), and touchdowns (33).

For the Bossier-Shreveport Battle Wings in 2010, Jordan had 101 receptions for 973 yards and eight touchdowns.

On April 13, 2011, Jordan signed again with the VooDoo. In what would be his final pro football career, Jordan had 35 receptions for 397 yards and eight touchdowns.

== See also ==
- List of NCAA major college football yearly receiving leaders
