= Ken Hebert =

American football player

No. 14
- Positions: Wide receiver, split end, punter, placekicker

Personal information
- Born: September 9, 1944 (age 82); San Bernardino, California, U.S.
- Listed height: 6 ft 0 in (1.83 m)
- Listed weight: 200 lb (91 kg)

Career information
- High school: Pampa (Pampa, Texas)
- College: Houston (1964–1967)
- NFL draft: 1968: 3rd round, 79th overall pick

Career history
- Pittsburgh Steelers (1968); Minnesota Vikings (1969)*; New Orleans Saints (1969)*
- * Offseason or practice squad member only

Awards and highlights
- NCAA scoring leader (1966); First-team All-American (1967)
- Stats at Pro Football Reference

Kenneth Daniel Hebert (born September 9, 1944) is an American former football player. He played college football as a split end, punter, and placekicker for the Houston Cougars from 1965 to 1967. He was the leading scorer in major-college football in 1966, rated as one of the national receiving leaders, and was selected as a first-team player on the 1967 All-America college football team. Hebert also appeared in three games for Pittsburgh Steelers of the National Football League (NFL) during the 1968 season.

== Early life ==
Hebert was born in San Bernardino, California, in 1944. He attended Pampa High School in Pampa, Texas. He was an all-around athlete who played baseball, basketball, and football, and was a sprinter for the track team. He grew up across the street from, and played high school football with, Randy Matson who won an Olympic gold medal in the shot put.

== Houston Cougars ==
Hebert attended the University of Houston where he played college football for the Houston Cougars from 1965 to 1967. Houston head coach Bill Yeoman said of Hebert: "He's just a great athlete. He's also a terrific competitor. He's a leader, too, and he's an outstanding young man." Assistant coach Melvin Brown said: "I don't know if I've ever seen anyone with as much athletic ability as Hebert. He can kick, catch, run, pass -- you name it and he'll do it."

As a sophomore in 1965, Hebert played at the wingback and end positions and was also the team's punter and placekicker. He set a school record in punting with a 40.7-yard average. He also scored Houston's first touchdown in the Astrodome. On a 4th-and-14 play in an upset victory over No. 14 Kentucky, he ran 61 yards for a touchdown on a fake punt.

As a junior in 1966, he played split end and caught 38 passes for 800 yards and 11 touchdowns. His 11 receiving touchdowns led all major-college players in 1966. He also ranked fourth nationally with an average of 21.1 yards per reception. He also kicked 41 extra points and two field goals in 1966 to lead the country in scoring with 113 points. In an October 29 game against Tampa, Hebert scored 36 points with five touchdown receptions (including receptions of 85 and 46 yards) and six extra points.

As a senior in 1967, Hebert caught 28 passes for 626 yards and seven touchdowns. His average of 22.4 yards per reception ranked third among major-college players in 1967. At the end of the 1967 season, he was selected by the Football Writers Association of America as a first-team player on the 1967 All-America college football team.

Hebert also played third base for the Houston baseball team, leading the team one year in RBIs and home runs while compiling a .305 batting average. In 1967, he played first base and had a .359 batting average during the regular season. He was teammates with Tom Paciorek who also played both baseball and football.

Hebert concluded his college career as Houston's all-time leading pass receiver and scorer. For his career, he had 90 receptions for 1,785 yards and 22 touchdowns, converted 89 of 103 points-after-touchdown, and averaged 41.6 yards per punt.

== Professional football ==
Hebert was selected by the Pittsburgh Steelers in the third round (79th overall pick) of the 1968 NFL/AFL draft. He was cut in the preseason but retained on the taxi squad. He was hampered by injury, but was activated in late November after an injury to Paul Martha. Hebert sustained a pinched nerve in his first game for the Steelers, appeared in only three NFL games, none as a starter, and tallied no receptions or yards gained. He had brief stints with the Minnesota Vikings and New Orleans Saints during the 1969 preseason, but was not included on their regular-season rosters.

== Later life ==
Hebert remained in Houston after his playing career. He was an assistant coach at Cleark Creek for one year and then entered private business. He became a co-owner of a Houston real estate company.

Hebert was inducted into the University of Houston Athletic Hall of Honor in 1978. In 1998, as part of the 50th anniversary of the Houston football program, Hebert was selected as both a first-team wide receiver and the first-team punter on Houston's all-time football team.

== See also ==
- List of NCAA major college football yearly receiving leaders
- List of NCAA major college football yearly scoring leaders
