= Rick Beasley =

Former American football wide receiver

Profile
- Positions: Split end, defensive back

Career information
- High school: Virginia Beach (Virginia Beach, VA)
- College: Appalachian State (1977–1980)

Awards and highlights
- Led major colleges in receptions (1978); led major colleges in receiving yards (1979)

Rick Beasley (born c. 1959) is a former American football split end and defensive back. He played college football for the Appalachian State Mountaineers from 1977 to 1980. He played as a defensive back in 1977 but played at split end from 1978 to 1980. He tallied 178 receptions for 948 yards and seven touchdowns in four seasons at Appalachian State. He ranked among the leading receivers in major-college football with 60 receptions in 1978 (fourth nationally), 74 receptions in 1979 (first), 971 receiving yards in 1978 (sixth nationally), 1,205 receiving yards in 1979 (first nationally), and 12 receiving touchdowns in 1979 (second nationally). At the end of the 1979 season, he led the voting for the All-Southern Conference football team. In July 1980, Beasley was named the athlete of the year in the Southern Conference. Beasley was not chosen in the NFL draft.

== See also ==
- List of NCAA major college football yearly receiving leaders
