= Brian Baima =

American football player (born 1949)

No. 26
- Position: Split end

Personal information
- Born: April 14, 1949 (age 77); Los Angeles, California, U.S.
- Listed height: 6 ft 0 in (1.83 m)
- Listed weight: 185 lb (84 kg)

Career information
- High school: Grant High School
- College: Valley College (1968–1969); The Citadel (1970–1971)

Career history
- Montreal Alouettes (1974)

Awards and highlights
- NCAA receiving leader (1971); Southern Conference Athlete of the Year (1971–1972)

Brian Scott Michael Baima (born April 14, 1949) is an American former football player. He grew up in Los Angeles, California, and played college football for Valley College in 1968 and 1969 and for The Citadel Bulldogs football team in 1970 and 1971. He was the first junior college transfer at The Citadel who was not obligated to participate in the Corps of Cadets. In 1971, he caught 63 passes for 1,230 yards and 13 touchdowns in 11 games. He led the NCAA major colleges in 1971 in receiving yards. He was selected as the Southern Conference athlete of the year for the 1971–1972 academic year. He was the first athlete in any sport from The Citadel to win the award. He tried out with the New England Patriots in 1972 but did not appear in any NFL regular season games. He played for the Montreal Alouettes of the Canadian Football League in 1974. He appeared in eight games for the Alouttes and caught 10 passes for 219 yards, including a 67-yard reception and run for a touchdown against the Winnipeg Jets on July 4, 1974. He married Brenda Channell in 1984.

== See also ==
- List of college football yearly receiving leaders
