= San Francisco River (Gila River tributary) =

River in New Mexico and Arizona in the United States

Coordinates: 32°58′34″N 109°22′19″W

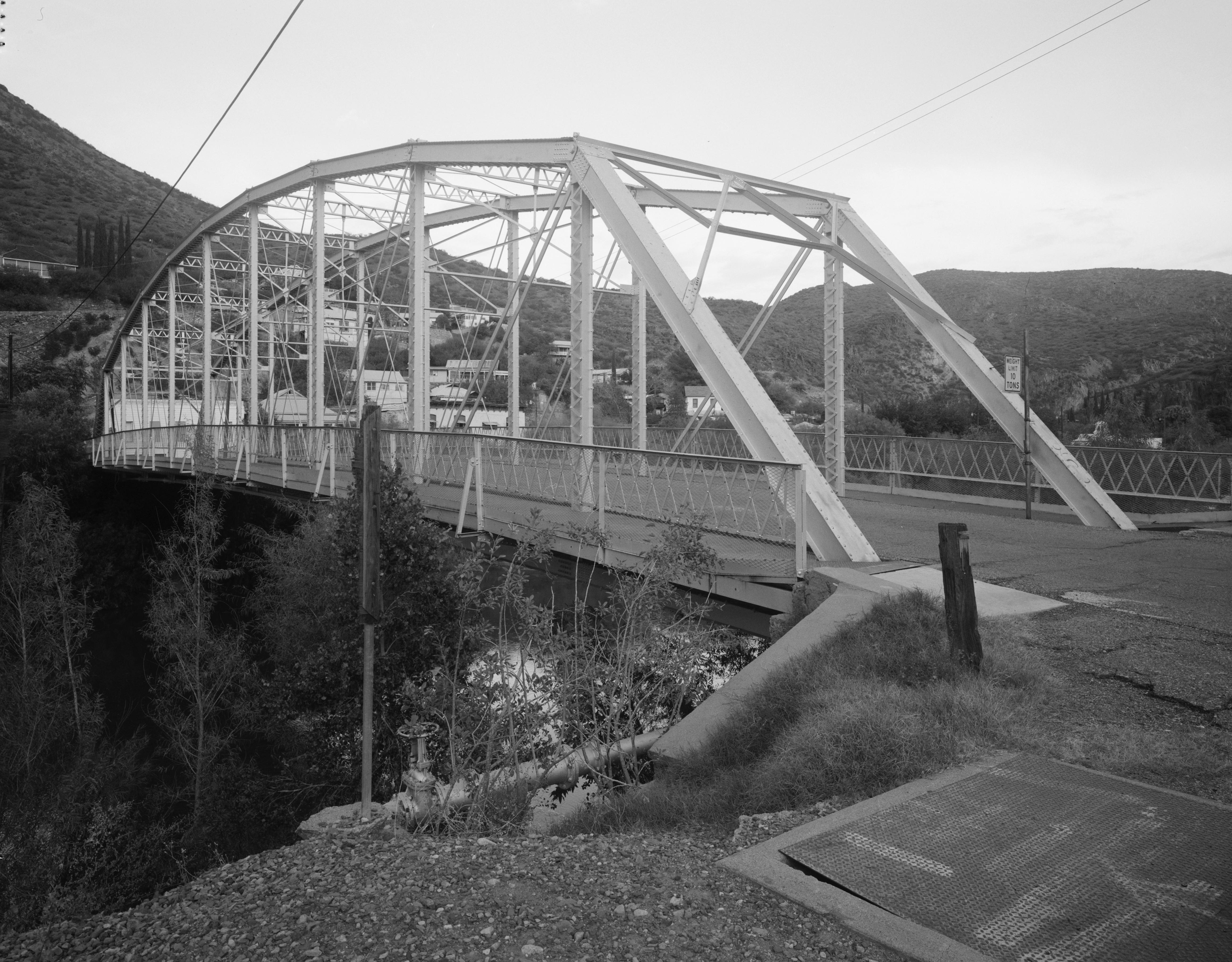
The Park Avenue Bridge over the San Francisco River in Clifton, Arizona

The San Francisco River is a 159-mile-long (256 km) river in the southwest United States, the largest tributary of the Upper Gila River. It originates near Alpine, Arizona and flows into New Mexico before reentering Arizona and joining the Gila downstream from Clifton.

== See also ==
- List of Arizona rivers
- List of New Mexico rivers
- List of tributaries of the Colorado River
- Park Avenue Bridge (Clifton, Arizona)

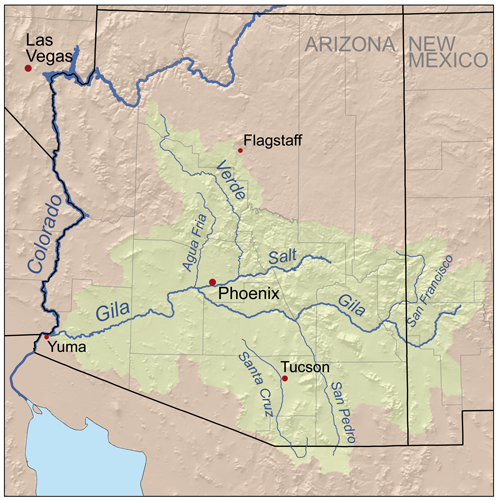
Map of the Gila River watershed including the San Francisco river
