= Dave Quehl =

Former American football player(born 1954)

Profile
- Position: Wide receiver

Personal information
- Born: October 4, 1954 (age 72); Cincinnati, Ohio, U.S.
- Listed height: 6 ft 0 in (1.83 m)
- Listed weight: 180 lb (82 kg)

Career information
- High school: St. Xavier (Cincinnati): Holy Cross (1972–1975)

Career history
- Hamilton Tiger Cats (1978); Ottawa Rough Riders (1979); Saskatchewan Roughriders (1979)

Awards and highlights
- NCAA major college receiving leader (1975)

David Keith Quehl (born October 4, 1954) is a former American football wide receiver. He played college football for the Holy Cross Crusaders from 1972 to 1975. He led the country with 63 receptions, and ranked third with 959 receiving yards, in 1975. He also tallied 62 receptions for 801 yards in 1974.

Quehl was selected by the New England Patriots in the 14th round (382nd overall pick) of the 1976 NFL draft, joined the club for the preseason, but was released before the regular season. Quehl also played in the Canadian Football League (CFL) for the Hamilton Tiger Cats (1978), Ottawa Rough Riders (1979), and Saskatchewan Roughriders (1979). He tallied 24 catches for 259 yards in the CFL.

Quehl was inducted into the Holy Cross Hall of Fame in 1982.

== See also ==
- List of NCAA major college football yearly receiving leaders
