= Rod Foppe =

Former American football wide receiver

Profile
- Position: Wide receiver

Personal information
- Listed height: 5 ft 10 in (1.78 m)
- Listed weight: 165 lb (75 kg)

Career information
- High school: Captain Shreve (Shreveport, LA)
- College: Louisiana (1975–1977)

Career history
- Shreveport Americans (1979–1981)

Awards and highlights
- Led NCAA in receiving yardage (1977)

Roderick Foppe (born c. 1956) is a former American football wide receiver. He played college football for the Louisiana Tech Bulldogs from 1975 to 1977. He was the leading receiver in major college football for the 1977 season with 1,274 receiving yards.

As a senior in 1977,he led all major college players nationally with 1,274 receiving yards. During the 1977 season, he also led the Southland Conference and ranked fifth nationally with 59 receptions and ninth nationally with 18.9 yards gained per reception. Foppe was the second consecutive Louisiana Tech player to lead the NCAA in receiving yardage, following Billy Ryckman in 1976. In a 1977 game, Foppe tallied 211 receiving yards on six receptions, the second-highest single-game receiving total in Southland Conference history.

Foppe was not offered the opportunity to pay in the National Football League, recalling one scout saying he chose not to sign Foppe because he was "a pint-size Reggie Jackson, Eldridge Cleaver, Stokley Carmichael and Muhammad Ali all rolled up into one." He did play for the Shreveport Americans of the American Football Association, earning all-AFA honors in two of three seasons with the team.

Foppe later coached high school football in Louisiana.

== See also ==
- Louisiana Tech Bulldogs football statistical leaders
