= 1983 Arizona copper mine strike =

Labor dispute between Phelps Dodge and the United Steel Workers

Arizona Copper Mine Strike of 1983
- Date: June 30, 1983 – February 19, 1986

Number
+2,000	

The 1983 Arizona copper mine strike began as a labour dispute between the Phelps Dodge Corporation and a group of union copper miners and mill workers, led by the United Steelworkers. The subsequent strike lasted nearly three years and resulted in the replacement of most of the striking workers and decertification of the unions. It is regarded as an important event in the history of the United States labor movement.

== Background ==
In 1981, the price of copper plummeted from a high of $1.40 in February to $.75 (seventy-five cents) per pound by December 18, resulting in losses for the entire copper industry. In 1981, the copper industry as a whole laid off approximately 50% (or 11,000) of its workers statewide. Phelps Dodge continued to operate with full manpower throughout most of 1981, although it continued to lose money. In December 1981, Phelps Dodge announced that it would lay off 108 workers in Arizona and New Mexico on January 3, 1982, and place the rest of the workers on a four-day work week in order to minimize the impact of the layoffs. In doing so, unlike the rest of the copper industry, Phelps Dodge continued to operate and pay its workers and reduce its production by 20%.

Phelps Dodge announced salary cuts to management personnel and laid off 100 salaried employees. On April 7, 1982, Phelps Dodge announced it would lay off all 3,400 of its hourly workers in Texas and Arizona, because of its losses. Phelps Dodge laid off workers, and a total of approximately 12,000 copper workers had been laid off across the industry. None of the copper mines in Arizona continued to operate.

=== Company PR efforts ===
Company chairman George B. Munroe decided to hold a series of "town hall meetings" to talk directly to the workers. "The copper you produce here," he told the miners, had to compete with copper produced in Canada, South America, Africa, Asia, Europe, and Australia. Essentially the price for copper is the same all over the world. And no U. S. producer can continue operating for very long when its cost of producing a pound of copper approaches or exceeds the price for which it can be sold. Munroe also pointed out that Arizona miners wages had risen at an annual rate of nearly 15 percent during the 1970s, while the average U. S. manufacturing employee had seen only a 10 percent increase. "The same eight dollars that Phelps Dodge pays for forty minutes of work", Munroe went on to say, "would buy more than a full shift of work from the average mining employee at a large South American copper company." Many of the unions in other industries had already agreed to pay cuts. Munroe said that the copper industry could be no exception.

Although copper prices remained stagnant throughout 1982, Phelps Dodge ended its shutdown, calling more than half the work force back about five months after Munroe's visits. All of the other copper companies continued their shutdowns.

Phelps Dodge lost money in 1982, which added to its debt burden. Other copper companies were then owned by large oil companies (Anaconda was owned by Atlantic Richfield, Cypress by Standard of Indiana, and Kennecott by Standard of Ohio) and could sustain losses, but Phelps Dodge was by itself. With no expectation of higher copper prices for years to come, management concluded that to survive, Phelps Dodge needed a long-term plan to reduce labor costs. To accomplish that, it determined to eliminate the cost-of-living adjustment (COLA) from the upcoming union contract.

== Contract negotiations ==
In April 1983, rival copper producer Kennecott and its unions agreed on a contract that froze base pay for three years. The union leadership considered that it had accommodated the suffering copper industry by agreeing to no wage increases for three years, except for the usual cost-of-living adjustments. It expected that the new Kennecott agreement would be quickly duplicated with all the other copper producers, the same system of pattern bargaining that had obtained for years in the industry, but Phelps Dodge decided not to follow the Kennecott agreement. It also decided and announced publicly that it could not afford to do so and would not shut down for a strike.

In April 1983, Phelps Dodge began negotiating with a coalition of its 13 labor unions, led by the United Steel Workers. Phelps Dodge insisted that it required elimination of cost-of-living adjustment, a freeze in wages, worker copayments for health care, and a lower wage scale for new hires. The unions believed that to give in to Phelps Dodge would destroy the system of uniform wages in the copper industry, which had served them so well for years. Heading the union bargaining team was Frank S. McKee, a veteran negotiator who had risen in the union from working the furnaces at Bethlehem Steel. McKee was preparing to run for the presidency of the United Steelworkers, and did not want to be perceived as weak. At the same time, the unions were also negotiating with Magma Copper and ASARCO. In June, both Magma and ASARCO agreed to contracts on the pattern set by Kennecott, which left Phelps Dodge the only holdout. The two sides could not agree on cost-of-living adjustments (COLA) and job combinations.

== Strike ==
Negotiations between Phelps Dodge and the unions failed to reach an agreement, and a strike began on midnight of July 30, including workers from Morenci, Ajo, Clifton, and Douglas, Arizona. Thousands of miners walked out and a picket line was formed at the Morenci Mine. The next day, Phelps Dodge increased security personnel in and around the mine.

However, then Phelps Dodge did exactly what it had announced it would do, but almost everyone had thought it was empty bravado. The company continued to produce copper during the strike for the first time since 1959. Since then, the company, like other copper companies, had shut down during strikes by often using the down time to perform needed maintenance. Copper mining companies did not want to incur the anger and the violence that they knew would happen if they maintained copper production during a strike. Some business analysts considered Phelps Dodge actions to be risky or foolish. A July 1983 cover of Business Week declared a "Management Crisis at Phelps Dodge."

The Phelps Dodge plants were kept running by plant supervisors and by office personnel, some brought in from the New York headquarters. They worked 12-hour shifts with some union workers who ignored the strike, about 700 according to the company. As expected, angry picketers shouted insults at those entering and leaving the plants. Picketers with bullhorns identified picket-line crossers by name. People spread roofing nails on roads going into the plants. Phelps Dodge succeeded in obtaining court orders limiting the number of picket, but generally did not succeed in getting them enforced. The Greenlee County Board of Supervisors imposed a 9 pm to 6 am curfew, but the Clifton City Council instructed its police not to enforce it.

Strikebreakers, the workers who continued working during the strike, received threatening phone calls, and car windows and windows in their homes were smashed. Company-owned railroad bridges were set afire. At the El Paso smelter, a group of strikers incapacitated a police dog by beating it with steel rebar, baseball bats, and two-by-fours. A bullet fired into the home of a strikebreaker in Ajo lodged in the brain of his sleeping two-year-old daughter. An automobile caravan of more than 100 cars wound through Clifton and threw rocks through the windows of strikebreakers' homes. At the same time, strikers and their supporters claimed that acts of violence by strikebreakers often were not prosecuted by authorities or reported in the media. In August, miners were subject to undercover surveillance by the Arizona Criminal Intelligence Systems Agency to identify the strikers engaged in violence. Meanwhile, the local government passed injunctions limiting both picketing and demonstrations at the mine.

== Hiring replacement workers ==
On August 5, Phelps Dodge announced it they would begin hiring permanent replacement workers for the Morenci Mine. The company took out large employment ads for new workers in the Tucson and Phoenix newspapers and advertised that the average annual wage for its employees was $26,200, plus what it calculated as $10,500 in benefits. Many people considered that an attractive wage, which had an effect in curbing sympathy for the strikers. However, the advertisements also greatly increased the anger of the strikers, who now faced permanent loss of their jobs. The company offered new workers virtually the same deal it had offered the unions, which had turned them down. Instead of an annual cost of living raise pegged to inflation, Phelps Dodge offered an annual wage review pinned to the price of copper. If copper increased, employees would receive a raise. It offered new workers $7.00 an hour instead of over $9.00. Instead of offering free doctor visits in the company hospital, they began to require a $5.00 copayment. The union leaders turned that down, but hundreds of workers from Tucson and Phoenix accepted it. Eventually, many of the union workers went back to work as well.

Tensions grew as Phelps Dodge prepared to bring in permanent replacements. On August 8, Arizona Governor Bruce Babbitt flew to Morenci and got Phelps Dodge to agree on a ten-day freeze on hiring replacement workers. Babbitt flew back to Phoenix believing that he had averted violence.

However, the next day, August 9, a crowd of 100 gathered outside the gates of the Morenci mine and plant. Many in the crowd carried chains and baseball bats, and guns could be seen in many of their cars. Arizona state police officers told Phelps Dodge managers that an attack appeared imminent and that they would not be able to protect the plant or those inside it.

Union representatives had stayed out of the assembled crowd to avoid making the unions liable for any violent actions, but they requested an urgent meeting with company management inside the plant. In a scene that writer Jonathan Rosenblum likened to an Old West showdown, as both sides watched, two Phelps Dodge managers walked out the gate and onto the middle of US Highway 191 (all traffic had been rerouted). Down the empty highway walked two union representatives to meet them. A state police official joined the group to mediate. The union men told Phelps Dodge that they had no control over the crowd and that the crowd was planning to storm the mine and plant unless the company shut down operations by the 3 pm shift change. The company men agreed to shut down.

The Phelps Dodge managers at Morenci quickly typed up an announcement that the Morenci mine and plant would immediately shut down for a 10-day cooling off period. Union leaders read the announcement to the crowd 30 minutes before the deadline, and violence was averted. The plant shut down, and a caravan of 150 cars drove out the gates through the jeering crowd. It seemed to some strikers that they had won a great union victory.

== State intervention ==
However, the situation turned rapidly against the strikers. Although there had been no fatalities during the strike, the threats of violence increased the political pressure on Democratic governor Babbitt to intervene. Babbitt was no fan of Phelps Dodge and said, “In my opinion, Phelps Dodge has the worst record in labor relations of any company that has ever operated in Arizona.” However he was also frustrated by what he considered the intransigence of the national union leaders. On August 15, despite a request from Governor Babbitt to hold off, Phelps Dodge mailed eviction notices to miners fired for misconduct on the picket line.

On August 17, despite his dislike of Phelps Dodge, Babbitt decided that he had a duty to prevent violence when the mines and mills reopened. He sent 325 National Guard soldiers to Morenci, and increased the number of state policemen there to 425. The action drew bitter criticism from union supporters, who accused Babbitt of being in the “back pocket” of Phelps Dodge. He responded that he was “in the back pocket of the American judicial system.”

Under heavy military and police protection, the Morenci mine and plant reopened on August 20 without incident, and the company again began hiring replacement workers. About 35 percent of the original work force returned. Entering workers were still subjected to obscene gestures, name calling, and threats of violence, but strikers at the gate could not prevent the replacement workers from entering the mine. Eight days later, 10 strikers were arrested in Ajo and charged with rioting. From that point on, the strike lost much of its momentum.

Although negotiations between the company and the unions continued for the rest of 1983, and union picketing continued for several years, the strike had effectively been lost. The National Guard withdrew at the end of August. On several occasions, strikers blocked the highway from Safford to Morenci to prevent workers from reporting for work. The National Guard returned briefly in May 1984 after another outbreak of violence.

== Decertification ==
In September 1984, the new workforce began voting in elections to decide whether or not to decertify the unions. The result was the largest mass decertification in US history: 35 locals of 13 different unions representing Phelps Dodge workers were decertified in Arizona, New Mexico, and Texas. After a series of confrontations and controversies, the strike officially ended on February 19, 1986, when the National Labor Relations Board rejected appeals from the unions attempting to halt decertification.

== Aftermath ==
Shortly after the strike had ended, world copper prices began to climb. That and the introduction of new mining technology led to a marked increase in profits at Phelps Dodge. While their annual profits in 1985 were just $29.5 million, profits rapidly climbed to $205.7 million in 1987 and $420 million in 1988. In 1989, The Wall Street Journal published a front-page story describing how Phelps Dodge restructured and avoided bankruptcy. The Arizona copper mine strike would later become a symbol of defeat for American unions. The Economics of Labor Markets and The Transformation of American Industrial Relations singled out the Arizona strike as the start of overt company strikebreaking in the 1980s. Journalists referred to the miners' strike as a precedent for subsequent labor failures. The Morenci mine, and many others, are still non-union today.

== Sources ==
- Kingsolver, Barbara. Holding the Line: Women in the Great Arizona Mine Strike of 1983. Ithaca, N.Y.: ILR Press, 1989.
- Rosenblum, Jonathan. Copper Crucible: How the Arizona Miner's Strike of 1983 Recast Labor-Management Relations in America. Ithaca, N.Y.: ILR Press, 1995.
