= Jay Miller (American football) =

American football player (born c. 1954)

No. 88 – BYU Cougars
- Position: Wide receiver

Personal information
- Born: 1954 (age 71–72); San Jose, California, U.S.
- Listed height: 6 ft 0 in (1.83 m)
- Listed weight: 190 lb (86 kg)

Career information
- College: BYU (1972–1976)

Awards and highlights
- NCAA receiving leader (1973)

Jay Miller (born c. 1954) was an American football player. He grew up in San Jose, California, and played college football for the BYU Cougars football team from 1972 to 1976. In 11 games during the 1973 season, he caught 100 passes for 1,181 yards and 8 touchdowns. He led the NCAA Division I-A colleges that year both in receptions and receiving yards. In a November 1973 game against New Mexico, he set an NCAA single game record with 22 receptions.

In the first game of the 1974 season, Miller sustained a knee injury and missed the remainder of the 1974 season. He also broke his scapula in 1974. He attempted a comeback in 1975, but sustained another knee injury in preseason practice and missed the entire 1975 season. He came back in 1976 and tallied six receptions for 66 yards.

== See also ==
- List of NCAA major college football yearly receiving leaders
