= Rainey Meszaros =

Former American football wide receiver

Profile
- Position: Wide receiver

Personal information
- Listed height: 6 ft 1 in (1.85 m)
- Listed weight: 185 lb (84 kg)

Career information
- High school: Fremont (Sunnyvale, CA)
- College: BYU (1979); Pacific (CA) (1980)

Awards and highlights
- Led NCAA in both receptions and receiving yardage (1980)

Rainey Meszaros (born c. 1961) is an American football coach and former wide receiver. He attended Fremont High School in Sunnyvale, California, where he played football, soccer, track and field (triple jump), and baseball. He then played college football for the BYU Cougars in 1979 and for the Pacific Tigers in 1980. In 1980, he led all major college players with 68 receptions and 1,062 receiving yards.

In May 1981, Meszaros's playing career ended as a result of a freak accident at his mother's home in Stockton, California. Meszaros leaned against a shower door that collapsed, and he fell on the jagged glass, resulting in severe lacerations on his right leg, cutting his thigh muscles to the bone, and severing of a number of nerves. His brother saved his life by slowing the heavy loss of blood and calling for paramedics.

Meszaros later worked as a high school football coach in California.

== See also ==
- List of NCAA major college football yearly receiving leaders
