= Ed Brown (end) =

American football player

Fordham Rams
- Position: End

Personal information
- Born: May 20, 1931; Hudson, New Jersey, U.S.
- Died: July 1, 2012 (aged 81); Towson, Maryland, U.S.

Career information
- College: Fordham (1950–1952)

Awards and highlights
- NCAA receiving leader (1952); NCAA record, 57 rec./season (1952-1958

Edward E. Brown (May 20, 1931-July 1, 2012) was an American football player. He played college football for the Fordham Rams. In 1952, he broke the NCAA pass receiving record with 57 receptions and led the country with 774 yards in eight games.

== Early life ==
Brown was born in Hudson, New Jersey, in 1931. He attended St. Peter's Preparatory School in New Jersey, graduating in 1949. He scored 66 of the football team's 248 points as a senior and received all-state honors for the 1948 season.

== Fordham ==
Brown played college football as an end for the Fordham Rams football team from 1950 to 1952. Despite playing in only eight games, he caught 57 passes for 774 yards in eight games during the 1952 season. In the final game of the 1952 season, Brown had 15 receptions for 233 yards against NYU. He led the NCAA that year in both total receptions and receiving yardage. His 57 receptions that year broke the NCAA record of 52 catches set by Barney Poole in 1947. Brown also set an NCAA record with an average of 96.8 receiving yards per game in 1952.

== Later life ==
In May 1953, Brown signed a contract to play professional football for the Chicago Cardinals. He joined the U.S. Army during the Korean War, serving from June 1953 to June 1955, and did not return to football after the war.

After his playing career, Brown worked for Western Electric. He moved from New Jersey to Ohio, back to New Jersey, and eventually to Maryland.

Brown was inducted into the Fordham Athletics Hall of Fame in 1979. He died in 2012.

== See also ==
- List of college football yearly receiving leaders
