= Morenci Unified School District =

Public high school in Morenci, Arizona

Coordinates: 33.044041°N 109.322360°W

Morenci High School

Location
- 473 Stadium Drive; Morenci, Arizona 85540; United States

Information
- School type: Public high school
- Motto: Once a Wildcat, Always a Wildcat
- School district: Morenci Unified School District
- CEEB code: 030230
- Principal: Don Goodman
- Teaching staff: 21.25 (FTE)
- Grades: 9-12
- Enrollment: 331 (2017–18)
- Student to teacher ratio: 15.58
- Colors: Red and black
- Mascot: Wildcats
- Website: www.morenci.org/page/mhs

Morenci Unified School District is a school district headquartered in Morenci, Arizona, United States.

In addition to Morenci, the district includes Clifton.

In 2022 Jennifer Morales became the superintendent. She was the first woman to ever have this position.

== Schools ==
- Morenci High School
- Fairbanks Middle School
- Metcalf Elementary School.
