= Morenci, Arizona =

CDP in Greenlee County, Arizona

- Census-designated place
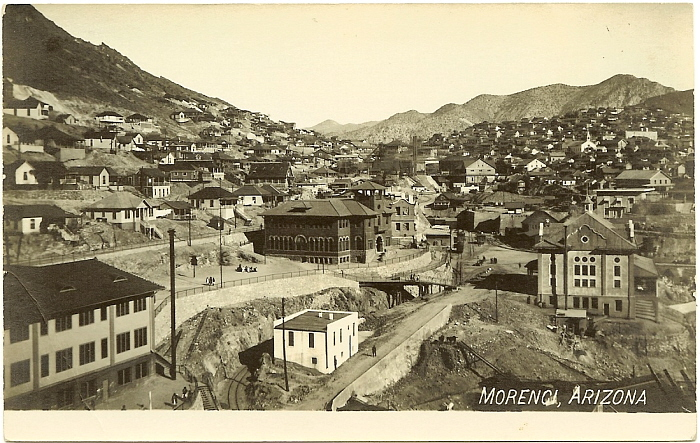
- Morenci, about 1910

- Location in Greenlee County and the state of Arizona

- Location in the United States Morenci (the United States)
- Coordinates: 33°03′14″N 109°19′52″W
- Country: United States
- State: Arizona
- County: Greenlee

Area
  - Total: 0.93 sq mi (2.40 km^{2})
  - Land: 0.90 sq mi (2.34 km^{2})
  - Water: 0.023 sq mi (0.06 km^{2})
- Elevation: 4,157 ft (1,267 m)

Population (2020)
  - Total: 2,028
  - Density: 2,240.9/sq mi (865.22/km^{2})
- Time zone: UTC-7 (MST (no DST))
- ZIP code: 85540
- Area code: 928
- FIPS code: 04-47610
- GNIS feature ID: 2408868

Morenci is a census-designated place (CDP) and company town in Greenlee County, Arizona, United States, and was founded by the Detroit Copper Mining Company of Arizona. The population was 2,000 at the 2000 census and 1,489 at the 2010 census. The biggest employer in Morenci (and in nearby Clifton) and the owner of the town is Freeport-McMoRan, the owner of the Morenci Mine, the largest copper mining operation in North America, and one of the largest copper mines in the world. The town was a site of the Arizona Copper Mine Strike of 1983. The large open-pit mine is north of the town.

== Geography ==
Morenci is located in central Greenlee County on the northeastern border of the town of Clifton, the county seat. U.S. Route 191 (the Coronado Trail) passes through the northern part of the community, leading east and downhill into Clifton and north through the Apache National Forest 117 miles (188 km) to Eagar.

According to the United States Census Bureau, the Morenci CDP has a total area of 0.98 square miles (2.55 km^{2}), of which 0.96 square miles (2.49 km^{2}) is land and 0.02 square miles (0.06 km^{2}), or 2.23%, is water.

=== Climate ===
This region experiences hot and dry summers, with average monthly high temperatures above 80 °F for seven months a year. According to the Köppen Climate Classification system, Morenci has a Cold Semi-arid climate, abbreviated "BSk" on climate maps.

== Demographics ==
Historical population
Census	Pop.	Note	%±
2000	2,000		—
2010	1,489		−25.5%
2020	2,028		36.2%
U.S. Decennial Census

=== 2020 census ===
As of the 2020 census, Morenci had a population of 2,028. The median age was 30.0 years. 30.3% of residents were under the age of 18 and 3.2% of residents were 65 years of age or older. For every 100 females there were 122.9 males, and for every 100 females age 18 and over there were 134.5 males age 18 and over.

0.0% of residents lived in urban areas, while 100.0% lived in rural areas.

There were 799 households in Morenci, of which 38.8% had children under the age of 18 living in them. Of all households, 41.3% were married-couple households, 36.3% were households with a male householder and no spouse or partner present, and 14.4% were households with a female householder and no spouse or partner present. About 33.9% of all households were made up of individuals and 2.4% had someone living alone who was 65 years of age or older.

There were 953 housing units, of which 16.2% were vacant. The homeowner vacancy rate was 0.0% and the rental vacancy rate was 8.5%.

Racial composition as of the 2020 census
Race	Number	Percent
White	1,340	66.1%
Black or African American	38	1.9%
American Indian and Alaska Native	121	6.0%
Asian	45	2.2%
Native Hawaiian and Other Pacific Islander	1	0.0%
Some other race	163	8.0%
Two or more races	320	15.8%
Hispanic or Latino (of any race)	912	45.0%

=== 2000 census ===
As of the census of 2000, there were 1,879 people, 672 households, and 454 families residing in the CDP. The population density was 2,317.4 inhabitants per square mile (894.8/km^{2}). There were 754 housing units at an average density of 929.9 per square mile (359.0/km^{2}). The racial makeup of the CDP was 68.0% White, 0.5% Black or African American, 2.1% Native American, 0.5% Asian, 25.0% from other races, and 3.9% from two or more races. 44.5% of the population were Hispanic or Latino of any race.

There were 672 households, out of which 45.7% had children under the age of 18 living with them, 56.7% were married couples living together, 6.1% had a female householder with no husband present, and 32.3% were non-families. 30.8% of all households were made up of individuals, and 0.7% had someone living alone who was 65 years of age or older. The average household size was 2.80 and the average family size was 3.55.

In the CDP, the population was spread out, with 35.6% under the age of 18, 7.2% from 18 to 24, 34.4% from 25 to 44, 22.1% from 45 to 64, and 0.6% who were 65 years of age or older. The median age was 30 years. For every 100 females, there were 119.0 males. For every 100 females age 18 and over, there were 128.7 males.

The median income for a household in the CDP was $46,010, and the median income for a family was $54,583. Males had a median income of $41,875 versus $26,063 for females. The per capita income for the CDP was $18,695. About 2.7% of families and 3.0% of the population were below the poverty line, including 2.9% of those under age 18 and none of those age 65 or over.

== Economy ==
The economy of Morenci as well as that of the surrounding area is almost completely dependent on the Morenci Mine. Between 2003 and 2008, the worldwide rise in copper prices led the mine to double its work force to 4,000 employees and increase production by 55 percent to an average of one million tons of ore per day.

Several hundred new homes were built, leading to a boom in the construction industry. All the homes in Morenci, new and old, remain owned by Freeport-McMoRan.

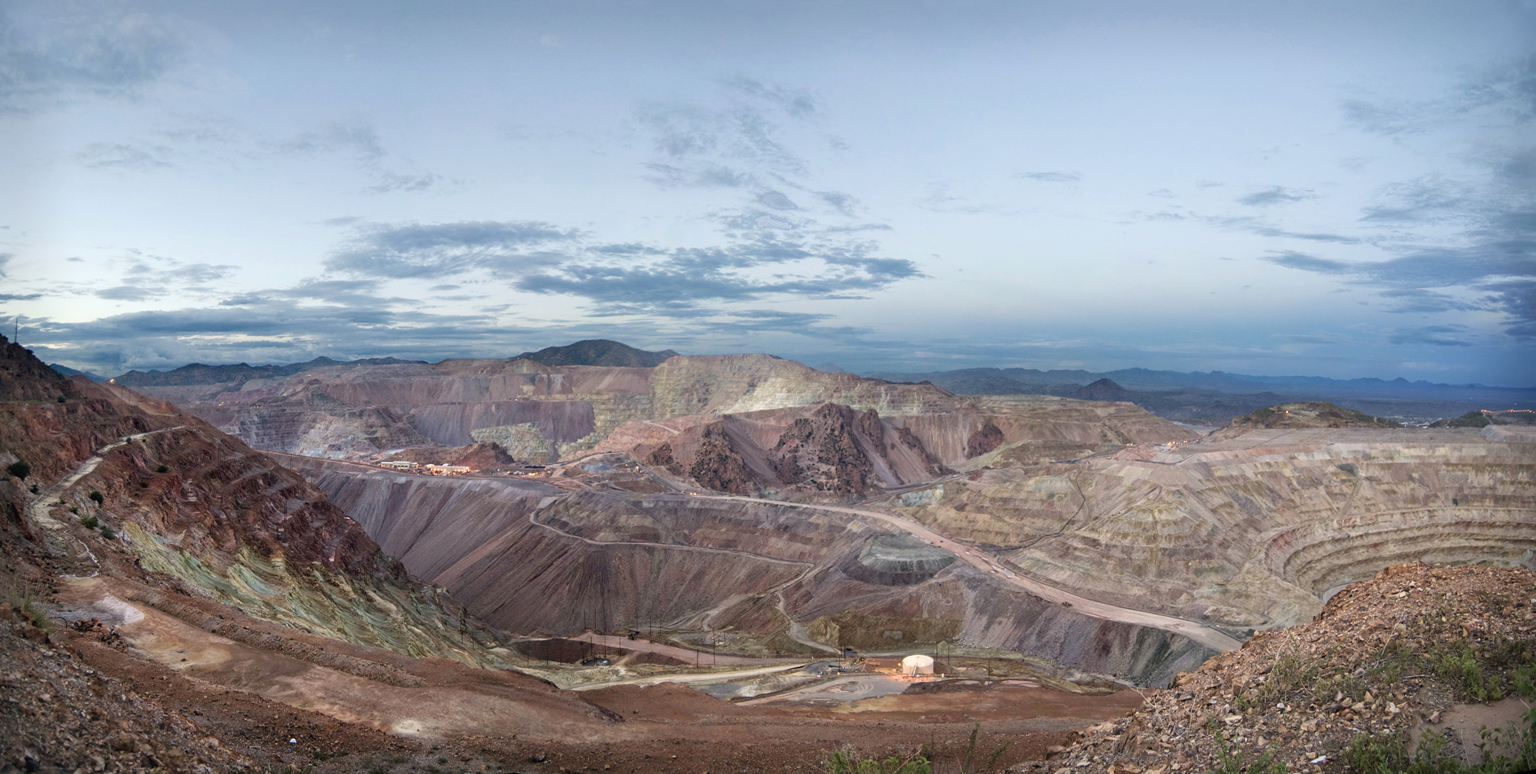
One of the active pits at the Morenci Mine. The horizontal shelves are the mining benches. The fan-like slopes are leached material, dumped into mined-out portions of the pit.

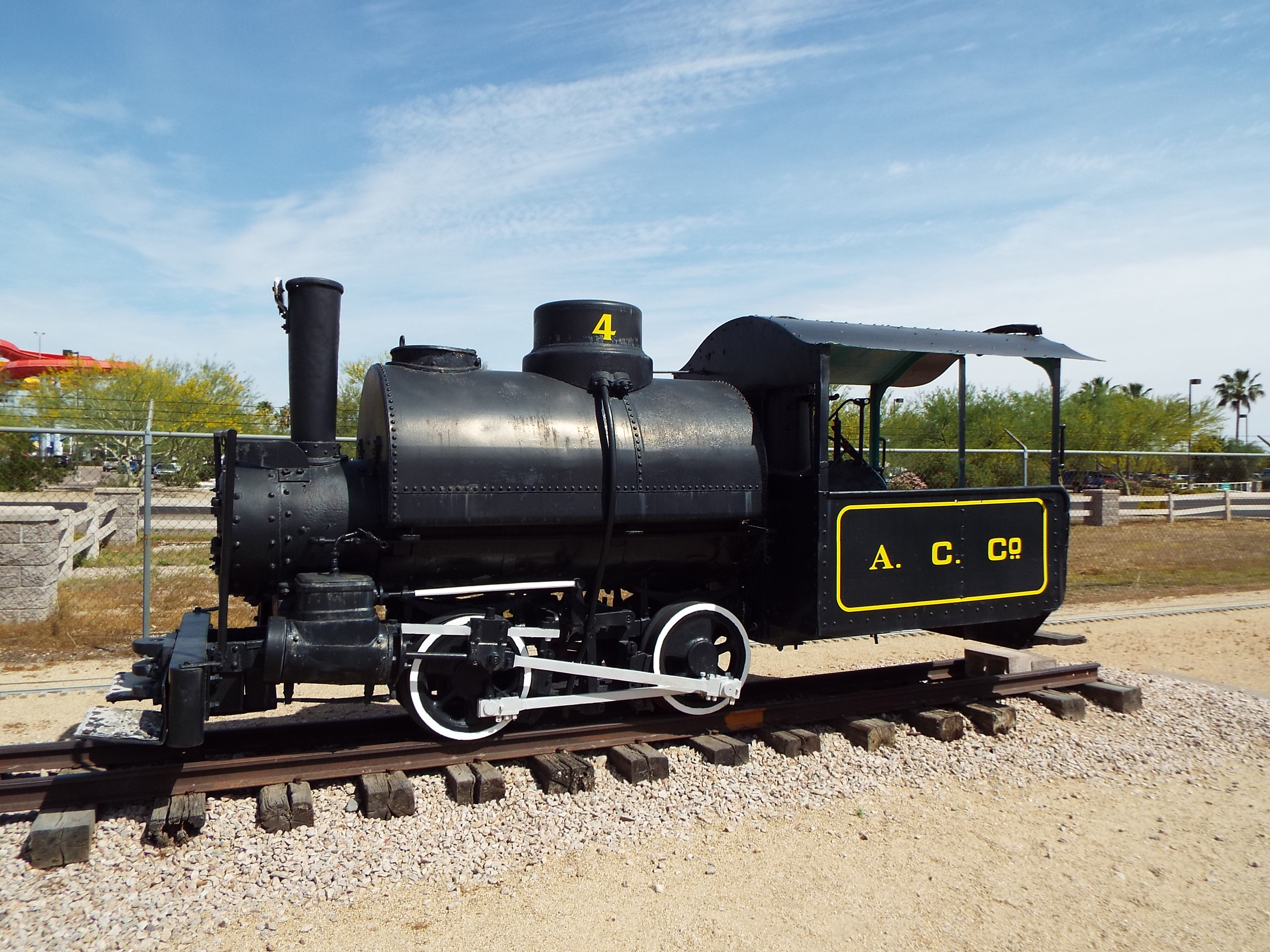
This Porter 0-4-0 is an 18" gauge locomotive that was once used as a copper mining locomotive in Morenci. The locomotive is currently on exhibit in the Sahuaro Central Railroad Museum in Glendale, Az.

Old Morenci Concentrator, 1942

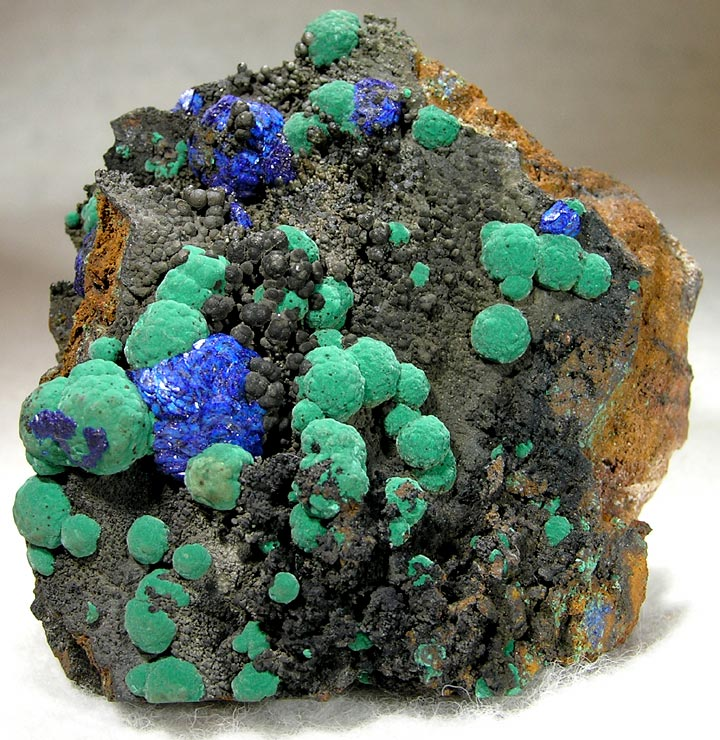
Malachite and Azurite from the Morenci Mine, which produces many fine specimens for mineral collectors.

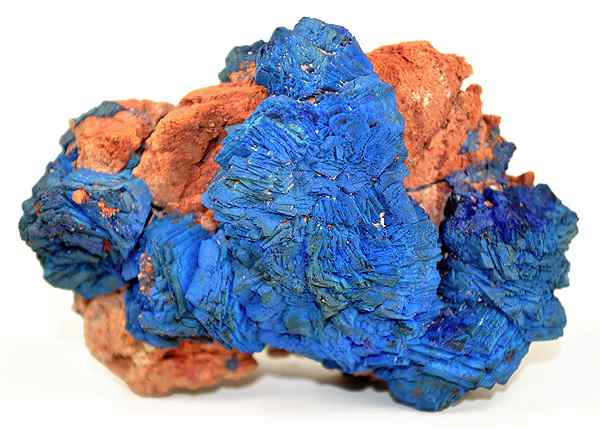
Azurite from Morenci

== Education ==
It is in the Morenci Unified School District.

== Notable people ==
- Ettore DeGrazia, Southwestern Impressionist painter
- Christine Nofchissey McHorse, Diné ceramic artist and sculptor

== See also ==
- Phelps Dodge Corporation, former owner of the Morenci Mine, was acquired by Freeport-McMoRan in 2007.

== In popular culture ==
Morenci features in HBO's series The Gilded Age (TV series), in a plot concerning the acquisition of land in the area for a railroad.
