= Dave Hibbert (American football) =

American football player (1938–2009)

Arizona Wildcats
- Position: Halfback

Personal information
- Born: October 9, 1938; Phoenix, Arizona, U.S.
- Died: July 19, 2009 (age 70); Paradise Valley, Arizona, U.S.
- Listed height: 5 ft 9 in (1.75 m)
- Listed weight: 160 lb (73 kg)

Career information
- High school: Phoenix Union
- College: Arizona (1958)

Awards and highlights
- NCAA receiving leader (1958); NCAA record, 61 receptions/season (1958–1961)

David William Hibbert (October 9, 1938 – July 19, 2009) was an American football player. While playing for the University of Arizona in 1958, he was the NCAA receiving leader in 1958 with 61 receptions. He also set the NCAA record for receptions in a season, a record that stood until 1960.

== Early life ==
Hibbert grew up in Phoenix, Arizona, and played football as a quarterback at Phoenix Union High School. At five feet, nine inches, he was considered too small to be recruited by the major colleges. He began his college football career at Phoenix College, where he was an All-American junior college quarterback in 1956 and 1957.

== University of Arizona ==
Hibbert transferred to the University of Arizona and played for the Arizona Wildcats football team. Playing at the halfback position, Hibbert caught 61 passes for 608 yards and four touchdowns in 10 games during the 1958 college football season. He caught 12 passes in Arizona's 33–6 loss to Texas Tech on November 8, 1958, the most receptions in a college football game since Ed Brown of Fordham caught 15 passes in a game in 1952. His 61 passes led the NCAA in receptions in 1958. He broke the previous NCAA record of 52 receptions set by Ed Brown in 1952. Hibbert's record was tied in 1959 by Chris Burford of Stanford in 1959 and broken in 1960 by Hugh Campbell of Washington State with 66 receptions.

== Later life ==
In 1959, Hibbert left the University of Arizona to do missionary work in Brazil for the Church of Jesus Christ of Latter-day Saints. He died in 2009 at age 70 in Paradise Valley, Arizona.

== See also ==
- List of college football yearly receiving leaders
