= Mike Mikolayunas =

Former American football wide receiver

Profile
- Positions: Wingback, tight end, fullback, flanker

Personal information
- Born: February 7, 1949
- Died: April 27, 1979 (aged 30); Simi Valley, California, U.S.
- Listed height: 6 ft 1 in (1.85 m)
- Listed weight: 200 lb (91 kg)

Career information
- High school: Cardinal Gibbons (Baltimore, MD)
- College: Davidson (1967–1970)

Career history
- Baltimore Colts (1971)*; Hartford Knights (1971)
- * Offseason or practice squad member only

Awards and highlights
- Led NCAA in receptions (1970)

Michael J. Mikolayunas (February 7, 1949 – April 27, 1979) was an American football wingback, tight end, fullback, and flanker. He attended Cardinal Gibbons High School in Baltimore, where he was a member of the National Honor Society and an all-state football player. He then attended Davidson College in Davidson, North Carolina, graduating in 1971 with a bachelor of science degree in psychology. He played college football for the Davidson Wildcats from 1967 to 1970. In a game against Richmond on October 11, 1969, he set a school-record 17 passes . He also ranked as the seventh best receiver in the country during the 1969 season. In 1970, and despite regularly being subjected to double coverage, he led the NCAA with 87 receptions (8.7 per game) and ranked third with 1,128 yards.

Mikolayunas was drafted by the Baltimore Colts, but was released before the regular season began. He played with the Hartford Knights of the Atlantic Coast Football League during the 1971 season.

In May 1973, Mikolayunas was hired as the varsity football coach at his alma mater, Cardinal Gibbons High School. He was also a math teacher at the school. He was later an assistant football coach at the United States Military Academy from 1974 to 1978. He joined the UCLA Bruins football coaching staff in February 1979, but died of a heart attack in April 1979 at age 30 at his home in Simi Valley, California. He was posthumously inducted into the Davidson College Hall of Fame in 1997.

== See also ==
- List of NCAA major college football yearly receiving leaders
