= Billy Ryckman =

American football player (born 1955)

No. 82
- Position: Wide receiver

Personal information
- Born: February 28, 1955 (age 71); Lafayette, Louisiana, U.S.
- Listed height: 5 ft 11 in (1.80 m)
- Listed weight: 175 lb (79 kg)

Career information
- High school: Lafayette
- College: Louisiana Tech
- NFL draft: 1977: 10th round, 257th overall pick

Career history
- Atlanta Falcons (1977–1980)

Awards and highlights
- Second-team All-American (1976)

Career NFL statistics
- Receptions: 50
- Receiving yards: 743
- Receiving touchdowns: 5
- Stats at Pro Football Reference

William Thomas Ryckman (born February 28, 1955) is an American former professional football player who was a wide receiver for three seasons with the Atlanta Falcons of the National Football League (NFL). He played college football for the Louisiana Tech Bulldogs. He became the host of The Sports Note, a sports talk radio program aired on ESPN radio affiliate KPEL 1420 AM in Lafayette, Louisiana.
