= Clifton, Arizona =

Town in Greenlee County, Arizona

- Town
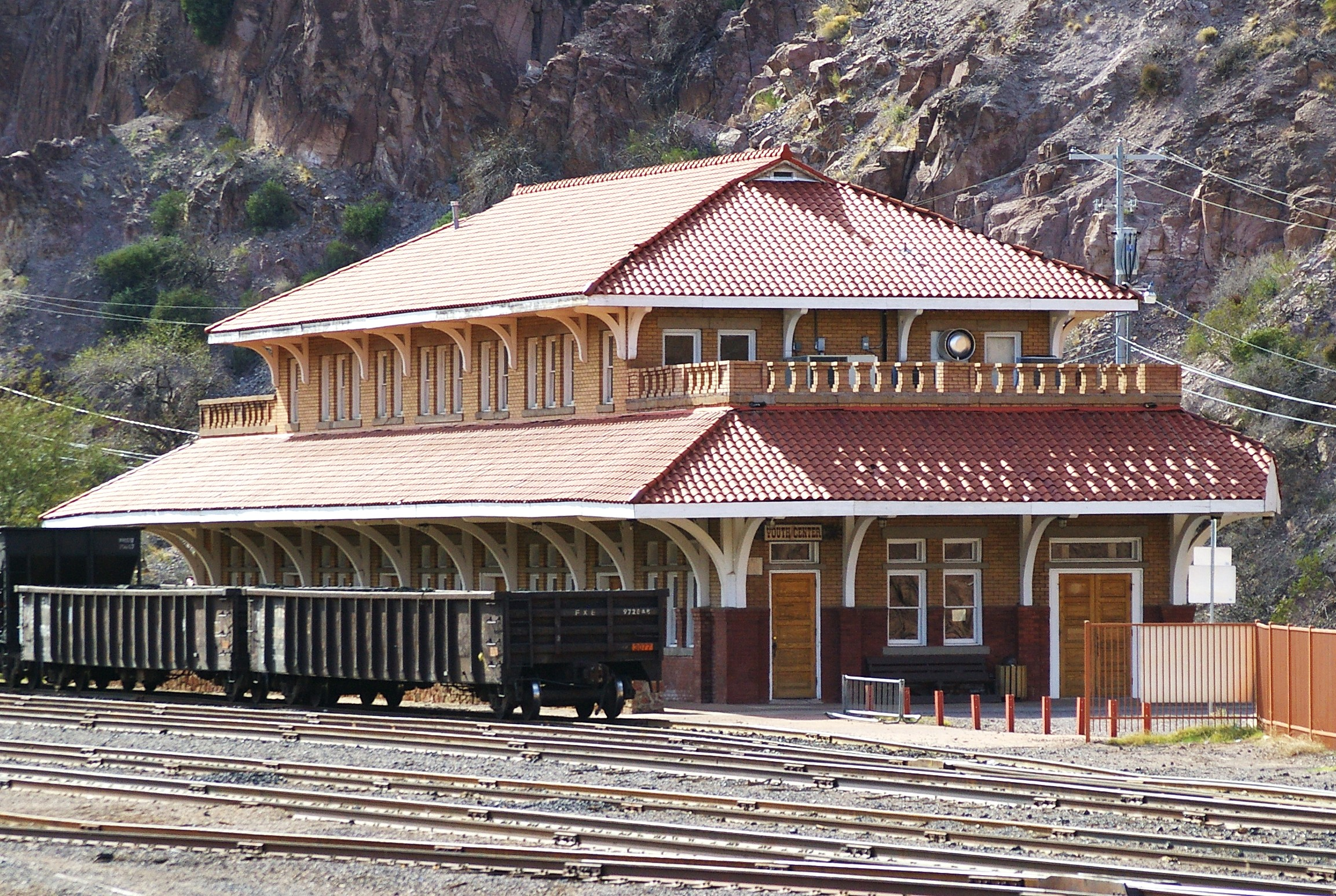
- Old train depot, built 1913, now used by the Chamber of Commerce

- Flag Seal
- Motto: "Where the trail begins"
- Location of Clifton in Greenlee County, Arizona

- Location in the United States Clifton (the United States)
- Coordinates: 33°01′29″N 109°17′17″W
- Country: United States
- State: Arizona
- County: Greenlee

Government
  - Mayor: Laura Dorrell

Area
  - Total: 14.84 sq mi (38.44 km^{2})
  - Land: 14.62 sq mi (37.87 km^{2})
  - Water: 0.22 sq mi (0.57 km^{2})
- Elevation: 3,875 ft (1,181 m)

Population (2020)
  - Total: 3,933
  - Density: 269.0/sq mi (103.85/km^{2})
- Time zone: UTC-07:00 (MST)
- ZIP code: 85533
- Area code: 928
- FIPS code: 04-14380
- GNIS feature ID: 2413215
- Website: cliftonaz.com

Clifton is a town in and the county seat of Greenlee County, Arizona, United States, along the San Francisco River. As of the 2020 census, Clifton had a population of 3,933. It was a place of the Arizona copper mine strike of 1983.

Clifton and Morenci are thought to be an economic area by the Arizona Department of Commerce.

== Geography and climate ==
According to the United States Census Bureau, the town has a total area of 14.8 square miles (38.4 km^{2}), of which 14.6 square miles (37.8 km^{2}) is land and 0.23 square miles (0.6 km^{2}), or 1.46%, is water. Clifton has a hot semi-arid climate (Köppen BSh) that closely borders on both the hot desert climate and the cool semi-arid climate. There is a large degree of diurnal temperature variation. Summers are very hot and sometimes humid, with most rainfall coming from the monsoon between July and October. The wettest year was 2004 with 28.49 inches (723.6 mm) including 6.97 inches (177.0 mm) in August, whilst the driest year with a full record was 1924 with only 4.85 inches (123.2 mm) including a mere 1.98 inches (50.3 mm) between July and October. Winters are mild (though with very cold nights) and dry, with snow only recorded in fourteen years since 1892.

Climate data for Clifton, Arizona (1991–2020 normals, extremes 1908–2012)
Month	Jan	Feb	Mar	Apr	May	Jun	Jul	Aug	Sep	Oct	Nov	Dec	Year
Record high °F (°C)	83 (28)	87 (31)	92 (33)	99 (37)	108 (42)	116 (47)	115 (46)	113 (45)	110 (43)	102 (39)	94 (34)	80 (27)	116 (47)
Mean maximum °F (°C)	70.1 (21.2)	76.2 (24.6)	84.5 (29.2)	92.4 (33.6)	101.2 (38.4)	108.3 (42.4)	109.2 (42.9)	105.4 (40.8)	100.8 (38.2)	94.0 (34.4)	80.3 (26.8)	70.4 (21.3)	110.3 (43.5)
Mean daily maximum °F (°C)	61.2 (16.2)	65.9 (18.8)	73.2 (22.9)	81.2 (27.3)	90.0 (32.2)	100.0 (37.8)	100.4 (38.0)	97.5 (36.4)	92.5 (33.6)	82.6 (28.1)	69.8 (21.0)	59.6 (15.3)	81.2 (27.3)
Daily mean °F (°C)	48.1 (8.9)	52.5 (11.4)	59.3 (15.2)	66.1 (18.9)	74.3 (23.5)	84.4 (29.1)	87.4 (30.8)	84.6 (29.2)	79.2 (26.2)	68.8 (20.4)	55.7 (13.2)	47.3 (8.5)	67.3 (19.6)
Mean daily minimum °F (°C)	35.1 (1.7)	39.1 (3.9)	45.3 (7.4)	51.0 (10.6)	58.7 (14.8)	68.9 (20.5)	74.4 (23.6)	71.6 (22.0)	65.9 (18.8)	54.9 (12.7)	41.5 (5.3)	35.0 (1.7)	53.5 (11.9)
Mean minimum °F (°C)	26.3 (−3.2)	30.4 (−0.9)	33.3 (0.7)	40.7 (4.8)	49.2 (9.6)	59.4 (15.2)	66.7 (19.3)	64.4 (18.0)	55.6 (13.1)	41.1 (5.1)	30.8 (−0.7)	24.5 (−4.2)	23.4 (−4.8)
Record low °F (°C)	4 (−16)	17 (−8)	22 (−6)	26 (−3)	34 (1)	46 (8)	45 (7)	51 (11)	39 (4)	32 (0)	20 (−7)	12 (−11)	4 (−16)
Average precipitation inches (mm)	1.25 (32)	1.53 (39)	0.85 (22)	0.47 (12)	0.49 (12)	0.43 (11)	3.12 (79)	3.28 (83)	1.71 (43)	1.45 (37)	1.33 (34)	1.11 (28)	17.02 (432)
Average precipitation days (≥ 0.01 inch)	4.1	5.0	3.6	1.9	2.3	2.4	8.5	10.6	5.9	3.6	3.4	4.1	55.4
Source: NWS – National Oceanic and Atmospheric Administration

== Demographics ==
Historical population
Census	Pop.	Note	%±
1890	600		—
1910	4,874		—
1920	4,163		−14.6%
1930	2,305		−44.6%
1940	2,668		15.7%
1950	3,466		29.9%
1960	4,191		20.9%
1970	5,087		21.4%
1980	4,245		−16.6%
1990	2,840		−33.1%
2000	2,596		−8.6%
2010	3,311		27.5%
2020	3,933		18.8%
U.S. Decennial Census

=== Racial and ethnic composition ===
Racial Makeup
Race (NH = Non-Hispanic)	% 2020	% 2010	% 2000	Pop. 2020	Pop. 2010	Pop. 2000
White Alone (NH)	38%	35.1%	40.4%	1,493	1,161	1,048
Black Alone (NH)	0.8%	0.6%	0.6%	33	20	15
American Indian Alone (NH)	3.8%	2.6%	2.2%	150	87	57
Asian Alone (NH)	0.5%	0.6%	0%	21	21	1
Pacific Islander Alone (NH)	0%	0.1%	0%	0	3	0
Other Race Alone (NH)	0.5%	0.1%	0.1%	20	3	3
Multiracial (NH)	2.4%	0.8%	0.8%	96	25	22
Hispanic (Any race)	53.9%	60.1%	55.9%	2,120	1,991	1,450

=== 2020 census ===
As of the 2020 census, Clifton had a population of 3,933. The median age was 30.4 years. 33.7% of residents were under the age of 18 and 8.3% of residents were 65 years of age or older. For every 100 females there were 108.6 males, and for every 100 females age 18 and over there were 110.7 males age 18 and over.

0.0% of residents lived in urban areas, while 100.0% lived in rural areas.

There were 1,336 households in Clifton, of which 46.6% had children under the age of 18 living in them. Of all households, 49.9% were married-couple households, 26.1% were households with a male householder and no spouse or partner present, and 17.4% were households with a female householder and no spouse or partner present. About 23.8% of all households were made up of individuals and 6.2% had someone living alone who was 65 years of age or older.

There were 1,566 housing units, of which 14.7% were vacant. The homeowner vacancy rate was 1.0% and the rental vacancy rate was 8.3%.

=== 2000 census ===
As of the census of 2000, there were 2,596 people, 919 households, and 685 families residing in the town. The population density was 174.8 inhabitants per square mile (67.5/km^{2}). There were 1,087 housing units at an average density of 73.2 per square mile (28.3/km^{2}). The racial makeup of the town was 67.1% White, 1.0 Black or African American, 2.3% Native American, <0.1% Asian, 26.7% from other races, and 2.9% from two or more races. 55.9% of the population were Hispanic or Latino of any race.

There were 919 households, out of which 41.3% had children under the age of 18 living with them, 57.3% were married couples living together, 10.4% had a female householder with no husband present, and 25.4% were non-families. 22.2% of all households were made up of individuals, and 8.2% had someone living alone who was 65 years of age or older. The average household size was 2.80 and the average family size was 3.27.

In the town, the population was spread out, with 32.3% under the age of 18, 7.7% from 18 to 24, 29.8% from 25 to 44, 19.3% from 45 to 64, and 10.9% who were 65 years of age or older. The median age was 32 years. For every 100 females, there were 109.7 males. For every 100 females age 18 and over, there were 105.0 males.

The median income for a household in the town was $39,786, and the median income for a family was $41,820. Males had a median income of $39,813 versus $19,485 for females. The per capita income for the town was $15,313. About 8.1% of families and 11.5% of the population were below the poverty line, including 12.4% of those under age 18 and 10.3% of those age 65 or over.

== Government ==
The town of Clifton operates under a council-manager form of government with seven elected council members, including a mayor and vice-mayor, and a town manager appointed by the council. Each council member is elected to a four-year term. As of 2025, the mayor since 2023 has been Laura Dorrell. In 2018, Town Manager Ian McGaughey left his position. His replacement, Heather Ruder, resigned six months later. The next year, Rudy H. Perez Jr. was selected. On 15 July 2024, Perez was fired.

== Transportation ==
Clifton is served by U.S. Route 191, Greenlee County Airport, and the Arizona Eastern Railway.

== Education ==
Since the closure of Clifton Unified School District in 2010, it is now in the Morenci Unified School District.

== Gallery ==
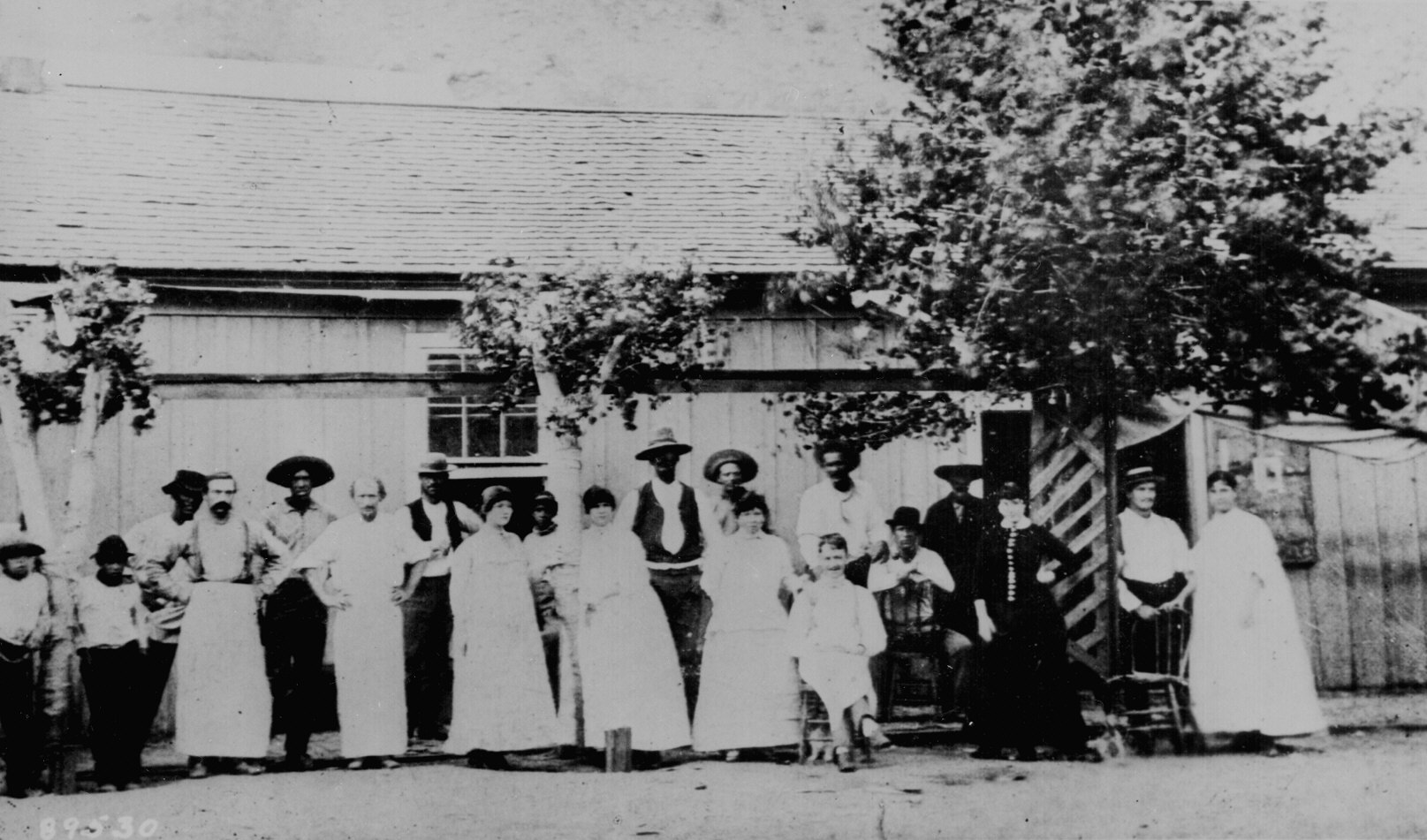
Hovey's Dance Hall in Clifton in 1884

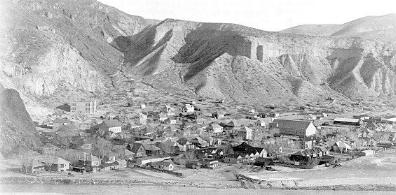
Clifton in 1903

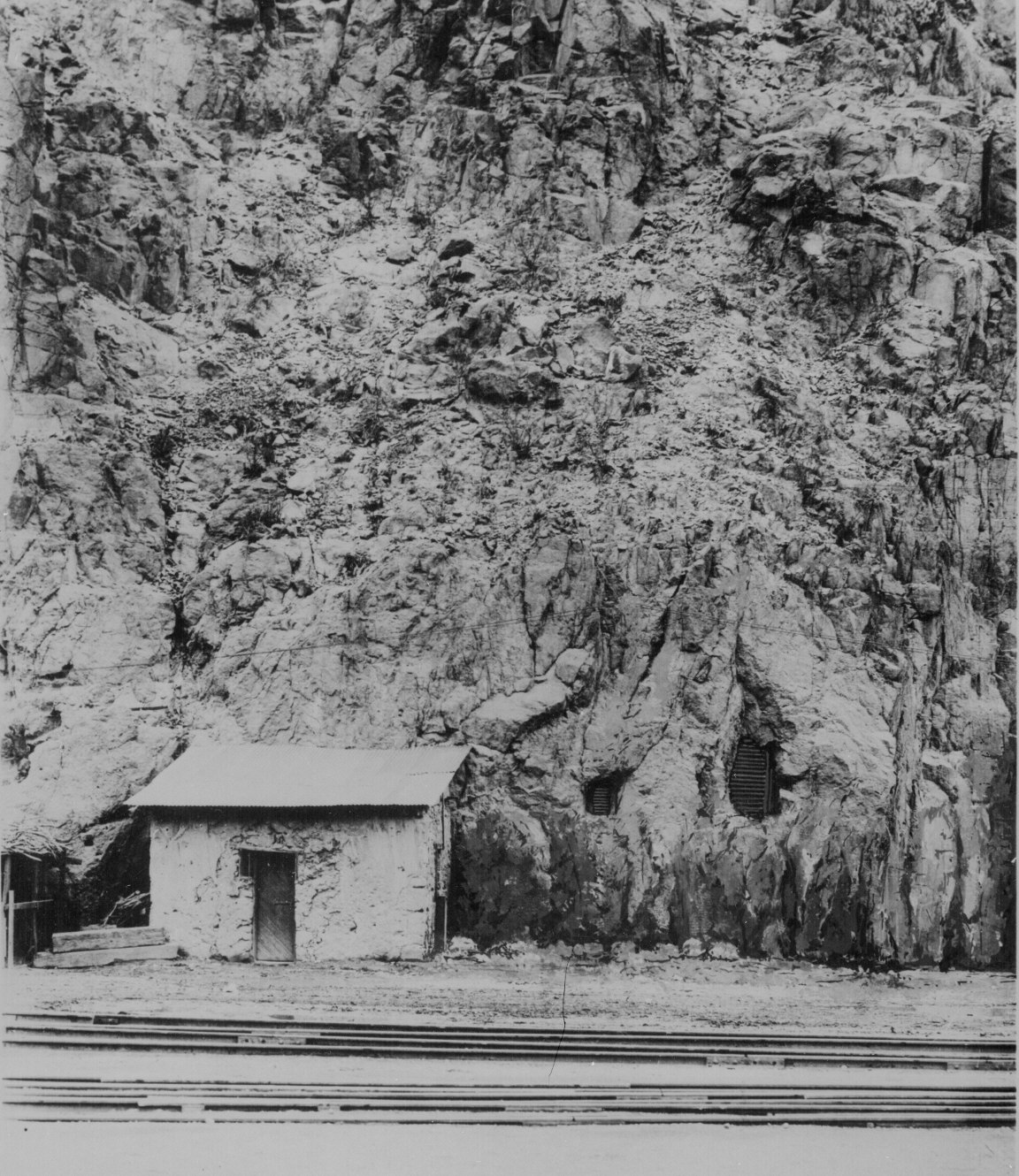
The Clifton Cliff Jail, sometime before it closed in 1906

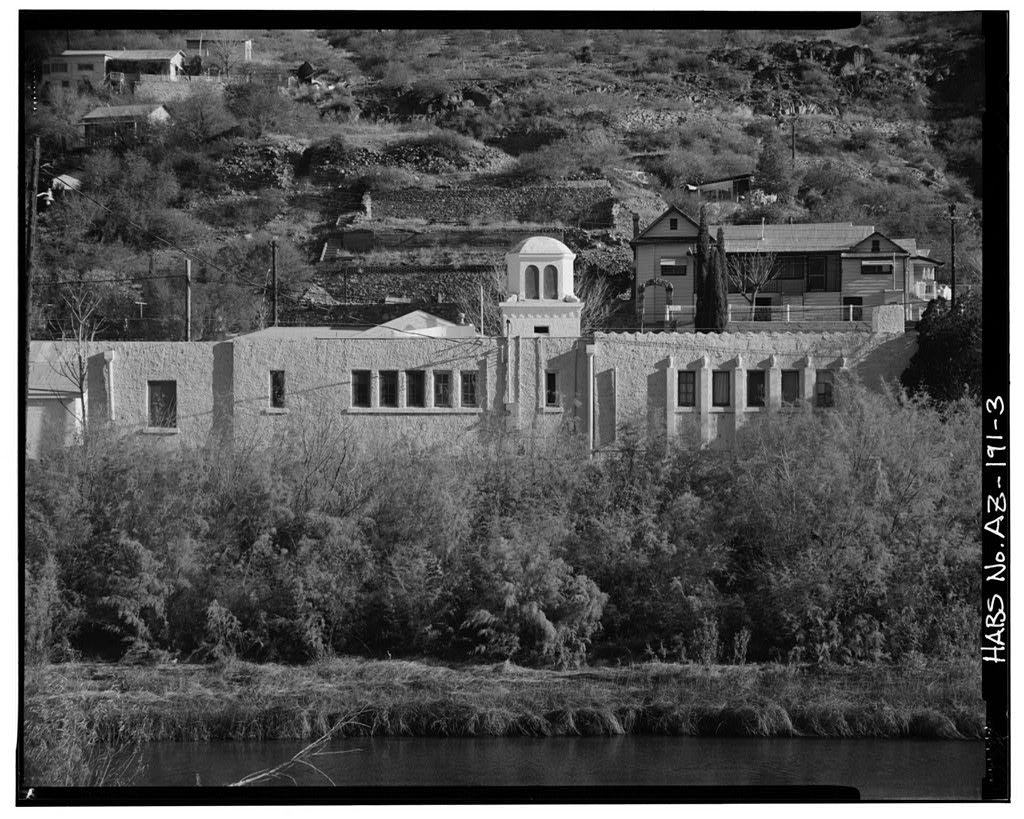
Clifton Mineral Hot Springs Bathhouse, which was built in 1928

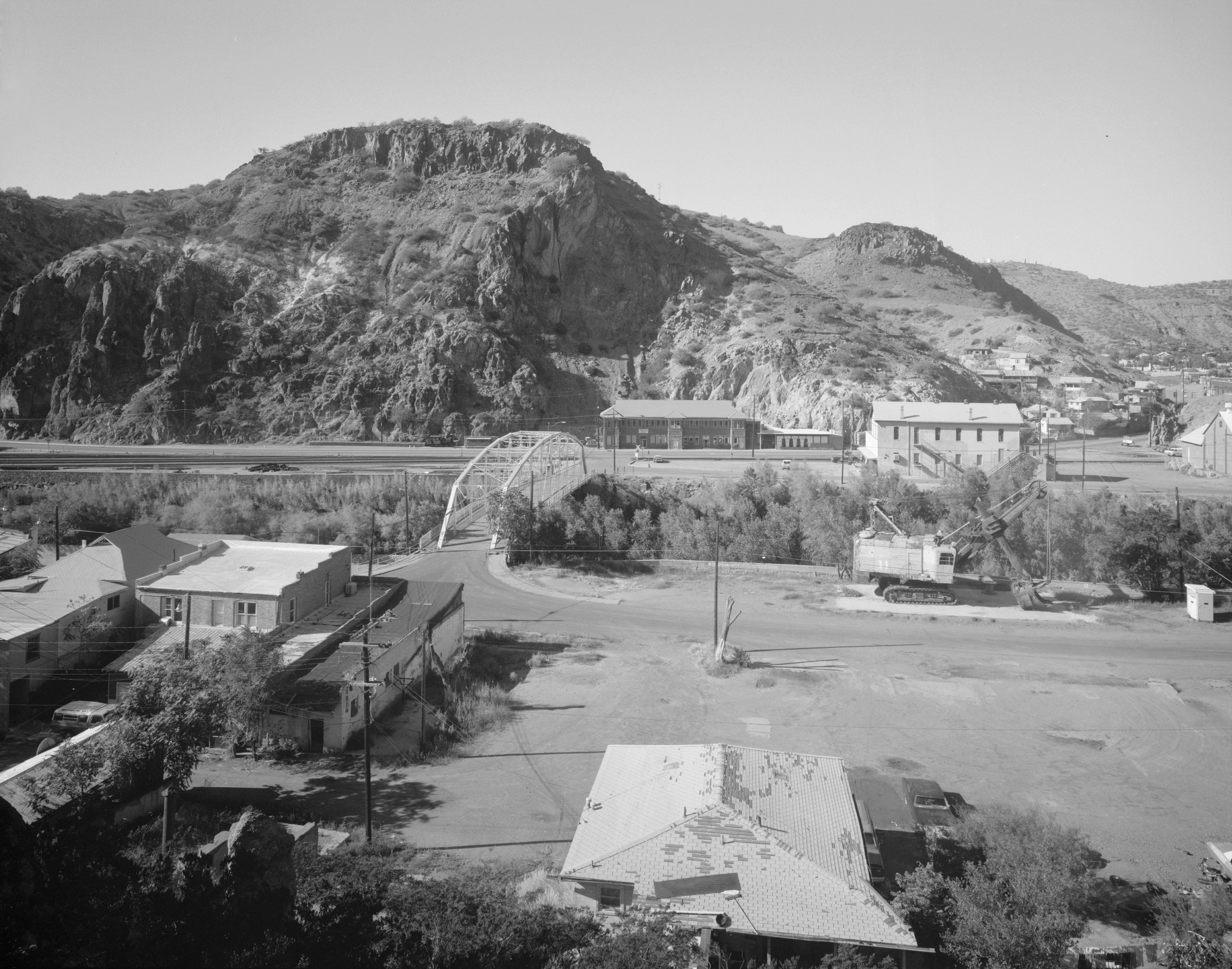
Clifton Townsite Historic District in 1993

== See also ==
- List of historic properties in Clifton, Arizona
- Clifton Townsite Historic District
