= List of largest high school gyms in the United States =

The largest high school basketball gyms in the United States refers to gymnasiums primarily used by secondary schools for basketball purposes. 14 of the 16 largest high school gymnasiums are located in the state of Indiana.

In March 2019, The Indianapolis Star reported that the Indiana High School Basketball Historical Society had done research through actual on-site counts, conducting personal interviews, and reviewing architectural blueprints to confirm the accuracy of the list of the largest high school gyms in Indiana. This research confirmed a reordering of the top three sites was necessary, moving Seymour's Lloyd E. Scott Gymnasium to the top spot. The previous #1, New Castle's Fieldhouse, was moved to third. However, when the Fieldhouse was renovated in 2020, its seating capacity was increased from 7,829 to 8,424, enabling New Castle to reclaim the #1 spot.

== Current list ==
The top 12 in total seating capacity are as follows:

	State	City	Venue	Capacity	Year built
1	Indiana	New Castle	New Castle Fieldhouse	8,424	1959
2	Indiana	Seymour	Lloyd E. Scott Gymnasium	8,228	1970
3	Indiana	East Chicago	John A. Baratto Athletic Center	8,054	1988
4	Indiana	Muncie	Muncie Fieldhouse	7,635	1928
5	Indiana	Marion	Bill Green Athletic Arena	7,560	1970
6	Texas	Dallas	Alfred J. Loos Fieldhouse	7,500	1965
7	Indiana	Elkhart	North Side Gymnasium	7,373	1954
8	Indiana	Michigan City	"The Wolves' Den" Gym	7,304	1971
9	Illinois	Moline	Wharton Field House	7,250	1928
10	Indiana	Gary	West Side High School Gym	7,217	1969
11	Indiana	Lafayette	Jefferson High School Gym	7,200	1975
12	Indiana	Southport	Southport High School Gym	7,124	1958

Notes

- One other high school-owned facility has a basketball capacity that would place it in this list—the Round Valley Ensphere, at Round Valley High School in Eagar, Arizona. Although it has a maximum capacity of 9,200 for court sports, it is not included in this list because it is a domed football stadium.
- The Anderson High School Wigwam in Anderson, Indiana, which was once one of the largest high school gyms in the country with a purported capacity of 8,996, closed in 2011, and remains standing but closed as of August 2016. In August 2014, the school board accepted a plan that will allow for redevelopment of the site while maintaining the gymnasium through at least 2030. When renovations are complete, the school district will have rent-free access to the arena for at least 12 event days per year, plus practices.
- Richmond High School's Tiernan Center, in Richmond, Indiana, was the 4th largest gym until 2020, when it was removed from the ranks after a renovation brought its seating capacity from 7,786 to 5,700.

== See also ==
- Hoosier hysteria
- List of high school football stadiums by capacity
