= Dustin Johnson (American football) =

American football player (born 1973)

No. 41
- Position: Fullback

Personal information
- Born: August 5, 1973 (age 53); Eagar, Arizona, U.S.
- Listed height: 6 ft 2 in (1.88 m)
- Listed weight: 236 lb (107 kg)

Career information
- High school: Round Valley (Eagar)
- College: BYU (1994–1997)
- NFL draft: 1998: 6th round, 183rd overall pick

Career history
- New York Jets (1998)*; Seattle Seahawks (1999)
- * Offseason or practice squad member only

Awards and highlights
- Second-team All-WAC (1997)

Career NFL statistics
- Games played: 1
- Tackles: 2
- Stats at Pro Football Reference

Dustin S. Johnson (born August 5, 1973) is an American former professional football fullback who played in the National Football League (NFL) for the New York Jets and Seattle Seahawks. He played college football for the BYU Cougars.

== Early life ==
Johnson was born on August 5, 1973, in Eagar, Arizona. He attended Round Valley High School in Eagar. On February 6, 1991, Johnson committed to play college football at Brigham Young University.

== College career ==
Johnson played college football for the BYU Cougars from 1994 to 1997 and was a three-year letterman from 1995 to 1997. After he redshirted in 1991, he spent the next two seasons on a mission trip. In three years, Johnson rushed for 427 yards and a touchdown with 66 receptions for 883 yards and four touchdowns at fullback and tight end. In 1997, he earned second-team All-Western Athletic Conference honors.

== Professional career ==
=== New York Jets ===
Johnson was selected in the sixth round, with the 183rd overall selection, by the New York Jets in the 1998 NFL draft. On July 15, he signed with the team. During the preseason game against the Philadelphia Eagles, Johnson suffered a non-displaced rib fracture. On August 14, he was waived by the Jets with an injury settlement.

=== Seattle Seahawks ===
On June 14, 1999, Johnson was signed by the Seattle Seahawks. He played in the season opener against the Detroit Lions on special teams, where he made two tackles. Johnson exited the game in the third quarter after a collision knocked him out with a concussion. This caused him to miss the next game against the Chicago Bears. On September 16, Johnson underwent surgery to relieve pressure on his brain. On September 24, he was placed on the injured reserve, ending his career. Johnson had developed subdural hematomas which required six holes to be drilled in his head and drained the fluid into his stomach. Doctors also discovered that he had a large cyst in his brain and that "it was amazing that [he] survived past high school".
