= Blue, Arizona =

Unincorporated community in the state of Arizona, United States

- Unincorporated community
- Interactive map of Blue, Arizona
- Coordinates: 33°36′36″N 109°06′24″W
- Country: United States
- State: Arizona
- County: Greenlee
- Elevation: 5,758 ft (1,755 m)
- Time zone: UTC-7 (MST (no DST))
- ZIP code: 85922
- Area code: 928
- GNIS feature ID: 26502

Blue (originally, Whittum) is an unincorporated community in Greenlee County, Arizona, United States.

Blue has a ZIP Code of 85922; according to the 2020–2024 American Community Survey 5-year estimates, ZIP Code Tabulation Area (ZCTA) 85922 had a population of 141. In addition to its post office, Blue also contains a public library, and the Blue School, serving all grade levels.

== History ==
The community was originally named for Nat Whittum, an original settler who was killed at the site in 1891. A post office was established at Whittum in 1894; however, its name was changed to Blue in 1898.

Blue's population was 80 in the 1940s.

== Climate ==
Climate data for Blue, Arizona, 1903–1989
Month	Jan	Feb	Mar	Apr	May	Jun	Jul	Aug	Sep	Oct	Nov	Dec	Year
Mean daily maximum °F (°C)	53.5 (11.9)	58.1 (14.5)	62.6 (17.0)	70.6 (21.4)	78.9 (26.1)	88.3 (31.3)	88.9 (31.6)	85.7 (29.8)	80.8 (27.1)	72.4 (22.4)	61.8 (16.6)	54.3 (12.4)	71.3 (21.8)
Mean daily minimum °F (°C)	18.6 (−7.4)	21.1 (−6.1)	24.5 (−4.2)	29.4 (−1.4)	36.0 (2.2)	44.3 (6.8)	52.5 (11.4)	51.4 (10.8)	45.2 (7.3)	34.3 (1.3)	24.6 (−4.1)	19.1 (−7.2)	33.4 (0.8)
Average precipitation inches (mm)	1.35 (34)	1.30 (33)	1.27 (32)	0.70 (18)	0.50 (13)	0.68 (17)	3.90 (99)	3.69 (94)	2.27 (58)	2.13 (54)	1.14 (29)	1.79 (45)	20.73 (527)
Average snowfall inches (cm)	5.3 (13)	5.9 (15)	2.8 (7.1)	1.0 (2.5)	0.0 (0.0)	0.0 (0.0)	0.0 (0.0)	0.0 (0.0)	0.0 (0.0)	0.3 (0.76)	1.7 (4.3)	7.6 (19)	24.6 (62)
Average precipitation days (≥ 0.01 in)	4	5	5	3	2	3	12	12	7	4	4	5	66
Source: WRCC

== Education ==
Blue School District 22 is the area school district, serving K-12. In 1984 Randy Collier of The Arizona Republic stated due to difficulties in transportation and from being far from other places, "the social life at Blue primarily is at the school."

Previously Blue had a K-8 school, so Round Valley High School in Eagar, of the Round Valley Unified School District, served Blue for high school; some students lived with relatives in Eagar and some traveled to and from Eagar via school bus.

Greenlee County Library System maintains the Blue Public Library in a log cabin adjacent to the Blue School.
