= Rudd Creek Pueblo =

Archaeological site in Apache County, Arizona

Coordinates: 34°04′11″N 109°11′57″W

The Rudd Creek Pueblo is an archaeological site in the Upper Little Colorado region in Springerville, Arizona just along the boundaries of the Mogollon and Anasazi culture areas. It is a late Tularosa phase site, dating from ca. 1225 to 1300, which is part of the Mogollan tradition, and located directly inside the Sipe White Mountain Wildlife Area. In 1996, the Rudd Creek Archaeological Project, a part of the Arizona State University Archaeological Field School, excavated the site to document the artifacts and architecture, and to observe and keep track the extent of pot hunting at the site, a problematic issue for not only this particular site but for archaeology as a whole.

== Site and environment ==
Rudd Creek Pueblo sits on a terrace that overlooks Rudd Creek (hence, the name) and is at an elevation of 2,335 meters (7,661 feet). The site is situated in a transitional area between the White Mountains and the Colorado Plateau and the Little Colorado River Valley.

Rudd Creek Pueblo is located in an open valley, but has access to three different microenvironments: the juniper savanna, riparian areas, and the lower montane coniferous forest. The inhabitants of Rudd Creek Pueblo, therefore, had access to a wide variety of flora and fauna and were able to exploit a broad spectrum of resources.

== Architecture ==
The architecture at Rudd Creek Pueblo is similar to other late Tularosa phase sites in the region, for example Coyote Creek Pueblo and Foote Canyon Pueblo. The site consists of about forty rooms situated inside a sizeable, rectangular shaped masonry roomblock and two large depression areas that are interpreted as being possible locations of great kivas, or ceremonial and ritual centers. The rectangular shaped pueblo is common and indicative of the Mogollon culture, and became common during the Tularosa phase. Most of the rooms that make up Rudd Creek Pueblo have been disturbed by looting and pot hunting, but some still contain undisturbed or “in-situ” fill. Many of the rooms have also been interpreted as probable habitation rooms, containing formal hearths, subfloor pits, and/or mealing bins or as storage rooms with very small floor areas and very few floor features. In addition, a ceremonial room or possible separate structure has been identified (Unit 5) and houses a large raised platform and bench. A circular hearth and ventilator are also present in the center of this room, suggesting that inhabitants may have used this room for rituals or special gatherings.

The construction of the walls in the main roomblock is mainly stone, and the walls are generally 20-40 centimeters wide. Despite challenges presented from inadequate wall preservation and damages from pot-hunting, it is thought that brown plaster was initially covering the walls. The interior and exterior surfaces of the walls, however, are not alike. The interior walls consist of unformed limestone, sandstone, and cobbles that are laid in mortar or mud. The exterior walls are built of limestone, sandstone, and vesicular basalt as well as tabular chinking stones. In addition, the exterior walls were more uniform in their construction, while the interior walls appear to be more haphazardly or unsystematically built. This difference is helpful in determining the building sequence of each room. The difference in wall construction indicates that the interior walls were built faster than the exterior walls. The masonry style of the walls at Rudd Creek Pueblo is, as expected, similar to other late Tularosa phase sites.

== Construction phases ==
There are four separate construction phases identified at Rudd Creek Pueblo. Based on analysis of the ceramic data at Rudd Creek Pueblo, site construction is thought to have begun between AD 1225-1250. The initial construction phase resulted in a single, nuclear unit consisting of small, adjacent rooms. The subsequent middle phases of construction involved the building of new rooms and remodeling of old rooms, including filling doorways, niches, and ventilators. The interior masonry style of the subsequent building phases differs from the initial in that at least one of the interior walls of each room displayed the same planned and organized construction of the exterior surfaces. During the middle phases, rooms were built next to the eastern side of the pueblo. The last building phase took place in the northern area of the roomblock and is believed to have resulted in the construction of the rooms just south of one of the great kivas (Unit 15). Due to excessive looting, determining when construction ended at Rudd Creek Pueblo is difficult, but probably occurred between AD 1250-1300.

== Great Kivas ==
Limited excavations were done in the two depressions just north and east of the main roomblock, but the areas each appear to be the location of a great kiva, where inhabitants of Rudd Creek Pueblo held ceremonies or ritual gatherings. The fill in the depression just north of the roomblock (Unit 15) yielded large amounts of ash and charred roof beam. Because of excessive looting in this unit, only a slab-lined cist was found in the base. A number of artifacts were found interred on the floor (three bone artifacts, a corrugated jar, two Tularosa Black-on-white jars, a Wingate Black-on-red bowl, an unidentifiable black and white ladle, a two-handed mano, and several mineral fragments) and appear to have been done so intentionally. The combination of these artifacts and the charred roof fragments in the fill lead to the possibility that this kiva was ritually decommissioned.

The second depression located just east of the roomblock exposed a probable square and semi-subterranean kiva about thirteen meters long and considerably intact. Wall construction of this kiva is much like the wall construction of the roomblock. Similar to the previous kiva (Unit 15), the fill in this kiva is mostly ash and charred roof bits with only a small percentage of artifacts, leading to the idea that this kiva was burned or ritually decommissioned when abandoned. Similar square kivas have been identified at other late Tularosa sites, such as Coyote Creek and Foote Canyon.

== Assemblages found ==
=== Ceramic Assemblage ===
There were 11, 956 ceramic specimens recovered during the excavations at Rudd Creek Pueblo. Nineteen different types of slipped or painted pottery sherds made up one third of the assemblage and the remainder was mainly unpainted brown ware sherds; brown ware pottery is very common in the Mogollon culture trend. The most common types of ceramics represented in the Rudd Creek assemblage are Tularosa Black-on-white, St. John’s Black-on-red, and St. John’s polychrome, which places the assemblage in chronology with other sites from the late-Tularosa phase, although assemblages recovered from sites to the east of Rudd Creek Pueblo differ.

=== Lithic Assemblage ===
The majority of the lithics found at Rudd Creek Pueblo were flaked stone and unretouched, while formal tools that had been carefully produced into an intentional tool, were rare. There were 698 flaked stone artifacts recovered, of which more than 80% were made of high-quality silicates (including chert, chalcedony, petrified wood, and quartzite). The majority of these flakes have been identified as simple flakes and are thought to be the result of percussion reduction, or the product of producing flakes by direct impact. As for formal tools, only a small number were recovered during excavation. Six unifaces, five bifaces, eleven saws/denticulates, and eleven projectile points were found and are similar to the tools documented at other Tularosa phase sites. One room (Unit 6) yielded an unusual cache of stone tools in a closed floor pit. The cache consisted of a biface, three projectile points, and one red stone bead. The purpose of the cache is not known, but it has been interpreted that Rudd Creek Pueblo occupants might have gathered the tools from an adjacent area and kept them for ceremonial uses or out of curiosity. The large number of flaked stone in combination with few formal tools suggests that residents of the pueblo focused primarily on quick tool production and used stone flakes more often that formal tools.

=== Flora and Faunal Assemblage ===
Because of the variety in environment that surrounds Rudd Creek Pueblo, a wide array of faunal remains were recovered, however, only the juniper savanna and montane forest were represented in the assemblage. In total, 906 specimens, representing 17 different taxa, were found including lagomorphs (rabbits and hares) and rodents. Only 14% of the faunal assemblage was made up of large-game specimens, the majority including deer and pronghorn antelope. It has been proposed that the area surrounding the pueblo was moderately vegetated due to the large number of specimens recovered that were herbivores. Carnivore specimens at Rudd Creek Pueblo are rare and it is suggested that what was recovered, remains of black bears and bobcats, are most likely indicative of animals that were utilized for their fur or for ritual use. In addition, bird remains are present, including turkey and other birds such as golden eagles. Birds other than turkey that are represented in the assemblage are thought to be evidence of the inhabitants of Rudd Creek Pueblo acquiring feathers for special purposes or rituals rather than as a means of subsistence.

== Site occupation and dating ==
Dating Rudd Creek Pueblo was done through a combination of artifact/ceramic analysis and dendrochronology, because dendrochronology was unreliable on its own due to an inadequate number of datable samples. Forty-three tree-ring samples were submitted, but only one could be dated. The only viable sample, which came from one of the great kivas (Unit 7), yielded a non-cutting date of AD1275++vv, meaning that the correct date of the sample is earlier than reported because the tree was either damaged or not dead. The tree-ring sample in combination with temporal trends associated with the types of ceramics represented at Rudd Creek Pueblo place construction of the site during the mid-1200s AD, with an occupation lasting until around 1300 AD.

It is believed that, through the evidence of structure burning and “in-situ” floor deposits, that Rudd Creek Pueblo was abandoned in a hurry. Two hypotheses have been proposed for why this was the case. The first is that the pueblo was burned due to widespread conflict, something seen commonly with other pueblos of the time period. Another alternative has been proposed based on the evidence of interred artifacts and burning that suggests the inhabitants of Rudd Creek Pueblo ritually closed the structure, a trend that is seen in pueblos of following periods.
