= Greenlee County, Arizona =

County in Arizona, United States

- County
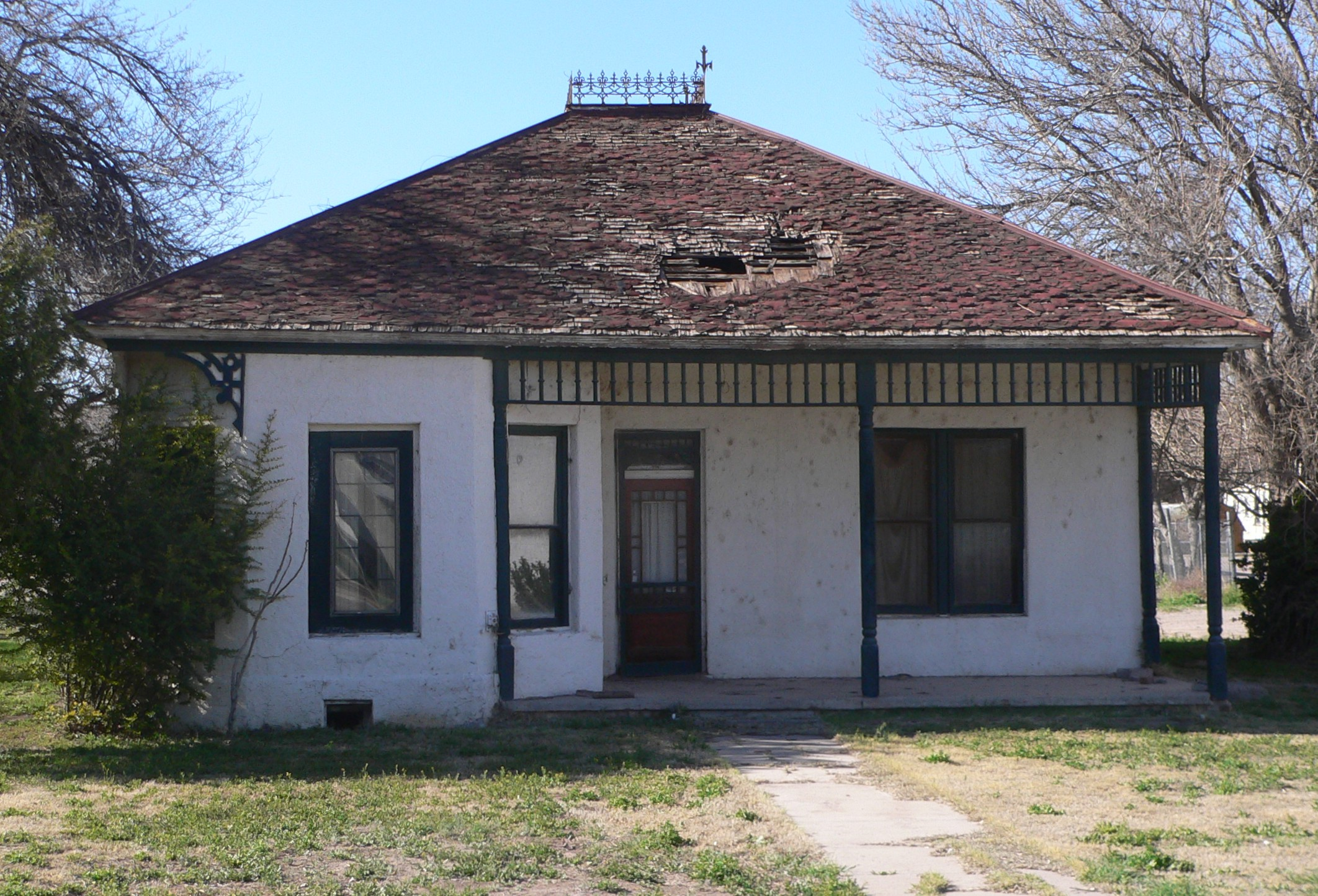
- Benjamin F. Billingsley House in Duncan, Arizona

- Seal Logo

- Location within the U.S. state of Arizona
- Coordinates: 33°06′06″N 109°16′07″W
- Country: United States
- State: Arizona
- Founded: March 10, 1909
- Named for: Mason Greenlee
- Seat: Clifton
- Largest town: Clifton

Area
  - Total: 1,848 sq mi (4,790 km^{2})
  - Land: 1,843 sq mi (4,770 km^{2})
  - Water: 5.3 sq mi (14 km^{2}) 0.3%

Population (2020)
  - Total: 9,563
  - Estimate (2025): 9,312 ▼
  - Density: 5.189/sq mi (2.003/km^{2})
- Time zone: UTC−7 (Mountain)
- Congressional district: 6th
- Website: greenlee.az.gov

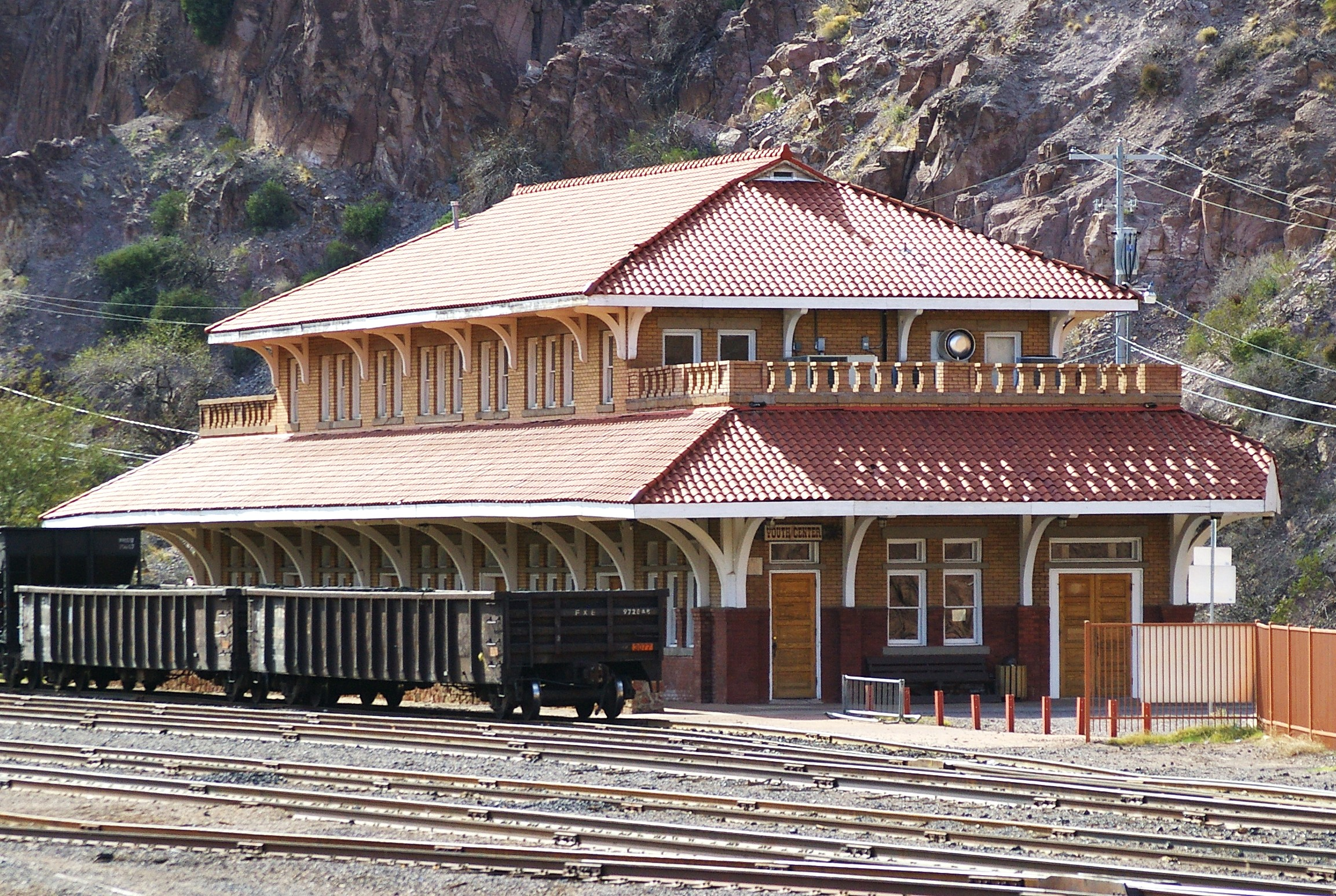
1901 Clifton railroad station, now used by the Chamber of Commerce and other community organizations.

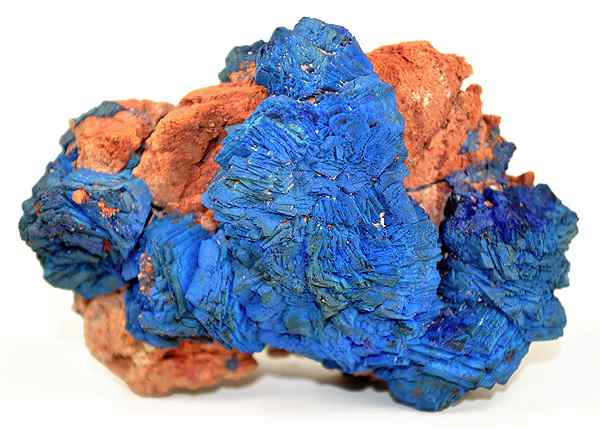
Azurite specimen from the Morenci Mine.

Greenlee County is a county in the southeastern part of the U.S. state of Arizona. As of the 2020 census, the population was 9,563, making it Arizona's least populous county. The county seat is Clifton.

The economy of Greenlee County is dominated by the Morenci Mine, the largest copper mining operation in North America, and one of the largest copper mines in the world. As of 2017, the mine complex, owned by Freeport-McMoRan, had about 3,300 employees.

== History ==
Greenlee County was created in 1909 and named for Mason Greenlee, who was an early settler in the Clifton area. It was Arizona's 14th county and formed from part of Graham County, which opposed the formation because Graham County would lose considerable revenue. Clifton has always been the county seat.

== Geography ==
According to the United States Census Bureau, the county has a total area of 1,848 square miles (4,790 km^{2}), of which 1,843 square miles (4,770 km^{2}) is land and 5.3 square miles (14 km^{2}) (0.3%) is water. It is the second-smallest county by area in Arizona.

=== Adjacent counties ===
- Cochise County – south
- Graham County – west
- Apache County – north
- Catron County, New Mexico – east
- Grant County, New Mexico – east
- Hidalgo County, New Mexico – southeast

=== National protected areas ===
- Apache-Sitgreaves National Forest (part)
- Gila Box Riparian National Conservation Area (part)

=== Major highways ===
- U.S. Route 70
- U.S. Route 191
- State Route 75
- State Route 78

== Demographics ==
Historical population
Census	Pop.	Note	%±
1920	15,362		—
1930	9,886		−35.6%
1940	8,698		−12.0%
1950	12,805		47.2%
1960	11,509		−10.1%
1970	10,330		−10.2%
1980	11,406		10.4%
1990	8,008		−29.8%
2000	8,547		6.7%
2010	8,437		−1.3%
2020	9,563		13.3%
2025 (est.)	9,312	▼	−2.6%
U.S. Decennial Census; 1790–1960 1900–1990; 1990–2000 2010–2020

=== Racial and ethnic composition ===
Greenlee County, Arizona – Racial and ethnic composition Note: the US Census treats Hispanic/Latino as an ethnic category. This table excludes Latinos from the racial categories and assigns them to a separate category. Hispanics/Latinos may be of any race.
Race / Ethnicity (NH = Non-Hispanic)	2020	2010	2000	1990	1980
White alone (NH)	46.5% (4,446)	48.1% (4,054)	53.9% (4,604)	54.6% (4,372)	49.5% (5,646)
Black alone (NH)	0.8% (80)	0.9% (79)	0.4% (34)	0.3% (27)	0% (5)
American Indian alone (NH)	2.9% (275)	1.7% (142)	1.4% (117)	1.6% (129)	2.4% (276)
Asian alone (NH)	0.7% (68)	0.5% (44)	0.1% (12)	0.2% (15)	0.3% (33)
Pacific Islander alone (NH)	0% (1)	0.1% (5)	0% (1)		
Other race alone (NH)	0.4% (34)	0% (3)	0.2% (13)	0.1% (9)	0% (0)
Multiracial (NH)	3% (283)	0.8% (70)	1% (85)	—	—
Hispanic/Latino (any race)	45.8% (4,376)	47.9% (4,040)	43.1% (3,681)	43.2% (3,456)	47.7% (5,446)

=== American Community Survey 2025 data ===
The United States Census Bureau estimated that in 2025, Greenlee County’s population was 9,312. It was also estimated that the county's population was 42.97% Non-Hispanic White, 47.49% Hispanic or Latino, 1.71% Non-Hispanic Black, 1.13% Asian, 3.70% Native American, 0.13% Pacific Islander, and 2.88% Multiracial.

Total	Population	Percentage
Non-Hispanic White	4,001	42.97%
Hispanic or Latino	4,422	47.49%
Non-Hispanic Black	159	1.71%
Asian	105	1.13%
Native American	345	3.70%
Pacific Islander	12	0.13%
Non-Hispanic Multiracial	268	2.88%

=== 2020 census ===
As of the 2020 census, the county had a population of 9,563. Of the residents, 28.4% were under the age of 18 and 12.6% were 65 years of age or older; the median age was 34.2 years. For every 100 females there were 109.7 males, and for every 100 females age 18 and over there were 112.3 males. 0.0% of residents lived in urban areas and 100.0% lived in rural areas.

The racial makeup of the county was 68.8% White, 0.9% Black or African American, 3.7% American Indian and Alaska Native, 0.8% Asian, 0.1% Native Hawaiian and Pacific Islander, 9.3% from some other race, and 16.4% from two or more races. Hispanic or Latino residents of any race comprised 45.8% of the population.

There were 3,634 households in the county, of which 38.5% had children under the age of 18 living with them and 18.5% had a female householder with no spouse or partner present. About 27.5% of all households were made up of individuals and 8.0% had someone living alone who was 65 years of age or older.

There were 4,389 housing units, of which 17.2% were vacant. Among occupied housing units, 44.3% were owner-occupied and 55.7% were renter-occupied. The homeowner vacancy rate was 2.2% and the rental vacancy rate was 11.7%.

=== 2010 census ===
As of the census of 2010, there were 8,437 people, 3,188 households, and 2,152 families living in the county. The population density was 4.6 inhabitants per square mile (1.8 inhabitants/km^{2}). There were 4,372 housing units at an average density of 2.4 units per square mile (0.93 units/km^{2}). The racial makeup of the county was 77.2% white, 2.3% American Indian, 1.1% black or African American, 0.5% Asian, 0.1% Pacific islander, 15.0% from other races, and 3.8% from two or more races. Those of Hispanic or Latino origin made up 47.9% of the population. In terms of ancestry, 12.9% were English, 12.1% were German, 10.6% were Irish, and 1.6% were American.

Of the 3,188 households, 37.5% had children under the age of 18 living with them, 49.5% were married couples living together, 9.6% had a female householder with no husband present, 32.5% were non-families, and 27.8% of all households were made up of individuals. The average household size was 2.64 and the average family size was 3.21. The median age was 34.8 years.

The median income for a household in the county was $48,696 and the median income for a family was $51,729. Males had a median income of $50,446 versus $34,171 for females. The per capita income for the county was $21,281. About 9.4% of families and 13.5% of the population were below the poverty line, including 17.8% of those under age 18 and 13.2% of those age 65 or over.

=== 2000 census ===
As of the census of 2000, there were 8,547 people, 3,117 households, and 2,266 families living in the county. The population density was 5 people per square mile (1.9 people/km^{2}). There were 3,744 housing units at an average density of 2 units per square mile (0.77 units/km^{2}). The racial makeup of the county was 74.2% White, 0.5% Black or African American, 1.7% Native American, 0.2% Asian, <0.1% Pacific Islander, 20.0% from other races, and 3.5% from two or more races. 43.1% of the population were Hispanic or Latino of any race. 25.2% reported speaking Spanish at home.

There were 3,117 households, out of which 39.2% had children under the age of 18 living with them, 58.3% were married couples living together, 9.0% had a female householder with no husband present, and 27.3% were non-families. 24.5% of all households were made up of individuals, and 7.3% had someone living alone who was 65 years of age or older. The average household size was 2.73 and the average family size was 3.26.

In the county, the population was spread out, with 31.7% under the age of 18, 7.5% from 18 to 24, 28.2% from 25 to 44, 22.6% from 45 to 64, and 9.9% who were 65 years of age or older. The median age was 34 years. For every 100 females, there were 109.2 males. For every 100 females age 18 and over, there were 108.0 males.

The median income for a household in the county was $39,384, and the median income for a family was $43,523. Males had a median income of $38,952 versus $23,333 for females. The per capita income for the county was $15,814. About 8.0% of families and 9.9% of the population were below the poverty line, including 11.1% of those under age 18 and 8.7% of those age 65 or over.

== Politics ==
Greenlee County used to be the most reliably Democratic county in Arizona, owing to the presence of the copper mining industry. As the county was heavily unionized and the Democratic Party was generally the party of organized labor, Greenlee County voted for the Democratic nominee in every presidential election from the state's admission to the Union in 1912 to 1996, being one of only seven Mountain State counties to support George McGovern in his landslide defeat against Republican Richard Nixon in 1972. (Note: The others were Deer Lodge and Silver Bow in Montana, Costilla and Pitkin in Colorado, and San Miguel and Rio Arriba in New Mexico.) Even Ronald Reagan was unable to win it in his 49 state landslide in 1984. However, in 2000, George W. Bush became the first Republican presidential candidate to win the county, and it has voted for the Republican nominee in the five elections since, giving Donald Trump 66% of the vote in 2020. Greenlee County continued to shift right in 2024, with Kamala Harris becoming the first Democrat in history to fail to break 30%.

United States presidential election results for Greenlee County, Arizona
Year	Republican		Democratic		Third party(ies)	
Year	No.	%	No.	%	No.	%
1912	109	9.28%	652	55.54%	413	35.18%
1916	672	28.79%	1,492	63.92%	170	7.28%
1920	905	44.45%	1,131	55.55%	0	0.00%
1924	404	29.97%	768	56.97%	176	13.06%
1928	685	42.08%	935	57.43%	8	0.49%
1932	377	19.29%	1,558	79.73%	19	0.97%
1936	218	12.31%	1,526	86.17%	27	1.52%
1940	619	22.08%	2,175	77.60%	9	0.32%
1944	739	27.33%	1,956	72.34%	9	0.33%
1948	680	22.97%	2,069	69.88%	212	7.16%
1952	1,377	31.32%	3,019	68.68%	0	0.00%
1956	1,784	39.69%	2,711	60.31%	0	0.00%
1960	1,313	29.94%	3,069	69.97%	4	0.09%
1964	1,132	26.45%	3,147	73.55%	0	0.00%
1968	1,026	27.35%	2,434	64.89%	291	7.76%
1972	1,758	45.57%	2,013	52.18%	87	2.26%
1976	1,532	36.07%	2,601	61.24%	114	2.68%
1980	1,537	40.64%	2,043	54.02%	202	5.34%
1984	1,801	47.58%	1,963	51.86%	21	0.55%
1988	1,526	46.21%	1,733	52.48%	43	1.30%
1992	1,451	36.34%	1,695	42.45%	847	21.21%
1996	1,159	34.16%	1,755	51.72%	479	14.12%
2000	1,619	54.70%	1,216	41.08%	125	4.22%
2004	1,899	61.92%	1,146	37.37%	22	0.72%
2008	1,712	58.63%	1,165	39.90%	43	1.47%
2012	1,592	53.32%	1,310	43.87%	84	2.81%
2016	1,892	57.33%	1,092	33.09%	316	9.58%
2020	2,433	65.97%	1,182	32.05%	73	1.98%
2024	2,308	69.77%	954	28.84%	46	1.39%

The county is located in Arizona's 6th congressional district, which has a Cook Partisan Voting Index of R+3 and is represented by Republican Congressman Juan Ciscomani. In the Arizona House of Representatives it is represented by Republican Becky Nutt and Republican Drew John. In the Arizona Senate it is represented by Republican Gail Griffin.

== Communities ==
Map of incorporated and unincorporated areas in Greenlee County

=== Towns ===
- Clifton (county seat)
- Duncan

=== Census-designated places ===
- Franklin
- Morenci
- York

=== Unincorporated communities ===
- Blue
- Apache Grove
- Hannagan Meadows
- Three Way
- Sheldon
- Verde Lee-Loma Linda

=== Other locations ===
- Strayhorse, a location along Route 191 in the vicinity of Strayhorse creek/canyon/campground

=== Ghost towns ===
- Boyles
- Guthrie
- Metcalf
- Oroville

== County population ranking ==
The population ranking of the following table is based on the 2010 census of Greenlee County.

† county seat

Rank	City/Town/etc.	Population (2010 Census)	Municipal type	Incorporated
1	† Clifton	3,311	Town	
2	Morenci	1,489	CDP	
3	Duncan	696	Town	1938
4	York	557	CDP	
5	Franklin	92	CDP	

== Education ==
School districts include:

- Blue Elementary School District
- Duncan Unified School District
- Eagle Elementary District
- Morenci Unified School District

== Economy ==
In 2024, about 90% of the county's GDP and 70% of the jobs were related to mining, with Freeport-McMoRan providing $285 million in economic benefits inclusive of $245 million in annual wages, taxes, and purchases.

=== Infrastructure ===
For electricity transmission, the county is served by Duncan Valley Electric Cooperative which is part of Touchstone Energy.

Morenci Water and Electric Company (MW&E) is a subsidiary of Freeport-McMoRan which gets its power from Freeport-McMoRan Energy Services (FMES) which sources energy via capacity rights at the Luna Energy Facility in Deming, New Mexico and power purchase agreements.

== See also ==
- National Register of Historic Places listings in Greenlee County, Arizona
