= Blue School District =

School district in Arizona, United States

Address
- 80 Turkey Creek Road Blue, Arizona, 85922; United States

District information
- Type: Public
- Grades: K–12
- NCES District ID: 0401230

Students and staff
- Students: 10
- Staff: 2.35

Blue School District 22 is a school district in the community of Blue, in Greenlee County, Arizona. The school covers grades K-12. The school, Blue School, is nicknamed "the Blue". The school facility is at the mouth of the Johnson Canyon, in the Apache National Forest.

== History ==
Prior to the 1890s teachers went to ranchers' families to provide educational services. In the late 1800s students wishing to attend high school traveled and resided in other communities/ In the 1890s a formal school was organized in Blue. Due to issues crossing the Blue River and transportation in general, there were three schools at a time in the early 20th century, with different campuses opening in 1912 and 1920, on the east and west sides of the Blue River, respectively, along with one in the Lower Blue Valley. A new school was built in 1930 because, in the previous year, a fire destroyed the principal school facility.

In 1962 a new two story building opened at the current location, with the lower floor used for classes and the upper floor an apartment for the teacher. Vinson Greer described the building as being a "traditional little white school house". This building, wooden and painted red and white, functioned as a one room school. In 1984 the school had four students, with one girl.

Lightning ruined the wooden building, as it overloaded the electrical system and started a fire, so a new one was built. The Eastern Arizona Courier stated that the fire occurred in 1985, while a PhD thesis stated that the fire occurred on February 14, 1987. The teacher was outside of Blue during the fire, and so was not in the teacher's apartment when the fire occurred. Alan Thurber of the Arizona Republic described the new facility as "a little house". The facility had a cafeteria facility, a room that housed storage, a bedroom, and the computer, and a classroom. The facility was about half the size of that of Eagle Elementary School. Thurber stated that both Eagle and Blue schools were "Technically[...]not one-room schools."

In the 1985–1986 school year, two students were enrolled. In the 1986–1987 school year, four more students were enrolled as the new teacher came with family members.

In 1991 it was described by Joe Salkowski of the Arizona Daily Star as one of five publicly operated one-room schoolhouses in the southeastern part of the state. That year, the school held classes four days per week so parents would not have to drive as often.

Previously Blue School was a K-8 school; in that era students attended Round Valley Unified School District's Round Valley High School in Eagar, with some living with relatives in Eagar and some traveling to and from Eagar via school bus. In 2021 the enrollment was 10 and the school now covered high school.

== Operations ==
According to the teacher, the students in upper grades assist students in prior grades. Kim Smith of the Eastern Arizona Courier wrote that Blue School "blend real-life experiences into the curriculum."

Randy Collier of The Arizona Republic stated due to difficulties in transportation and from being far from other places, "the social life at Blue primarily is at the school."

== Campus ==
The campus has a classroom and a kitchen in the same room, with two restroom facilities and a supply room. A counter between the classroom and kitchen. At some point, aluminum siding was added to the current 1987 school. The siding is colored tan. Vinson Greer, author of a PhD thesis, wrote that the school's appearance was different from the previous building.

In 1998 a double wide trailer was used as a teacher apartment.

== See also ==
- Non-high school district
