= Springerville Municipal Airport =

Airport in Apache County, Arizona

- IATA: none; ICAO: KJTC; FAA LID: JTC

Summary
- Airport type: Public
- Owner: Town of Springerville
- Serves: Springerville, Arizona
- Elevation AMSL: 7,055 ft (2,150 m)
- Coordinates: 34°07′46″N 109°18′39″W
- Website: Official website

Map
- Location within Arizona Location within the United States

Runways
Direction	Length		Surface
Direction	ft	m	Surface
3/21	8,422	2,567	Asphalt
11/29	4,603	1,403	Asphalt

Statistics (2010)
- Aircraft operations: 4,500
- Based aircraft: 21
- Source: Federal Aviation Administration

Springerville Municipal Airport (FAA LID: JTC, formerly D68 and Q35) is a town-owned public-use airport located 1.15 miles (1.00 nmi; 1.85 km) west of the central business district of Springerville, a town in Apache County, Arizona, United States. The airport is included in the FAA's National Plan of Integrated Airport Systems for 2009–2013, which categorizes it as a general aviation facility.

== Facilities and aircraft ==
Springerville Municipal Airport covers an area of 500 acres (200 ha) at an elevation of 7,055 feet (2,150 m) above mean sea level. It has two asphalt paved runways: 3/21 is 8,422 by 75 feet (2,567 x 23 m) and 11/29 is 4,603 by 60 feet (1,403 x 18 m).

For the 12-month period ending April 28, 2010, the airport had 4,500 aircraft operations, an average of 12 per day: 93% general aviation and 4% air taxi, and 2% military. At that time there were 21 aircraft based at this airport: 81% single-engine, 9.5% multi-engine and 9.5% ultralight.

== See also ==
- List of airports in Arizona
