= Apache Grove, Arizona =

- Populated place
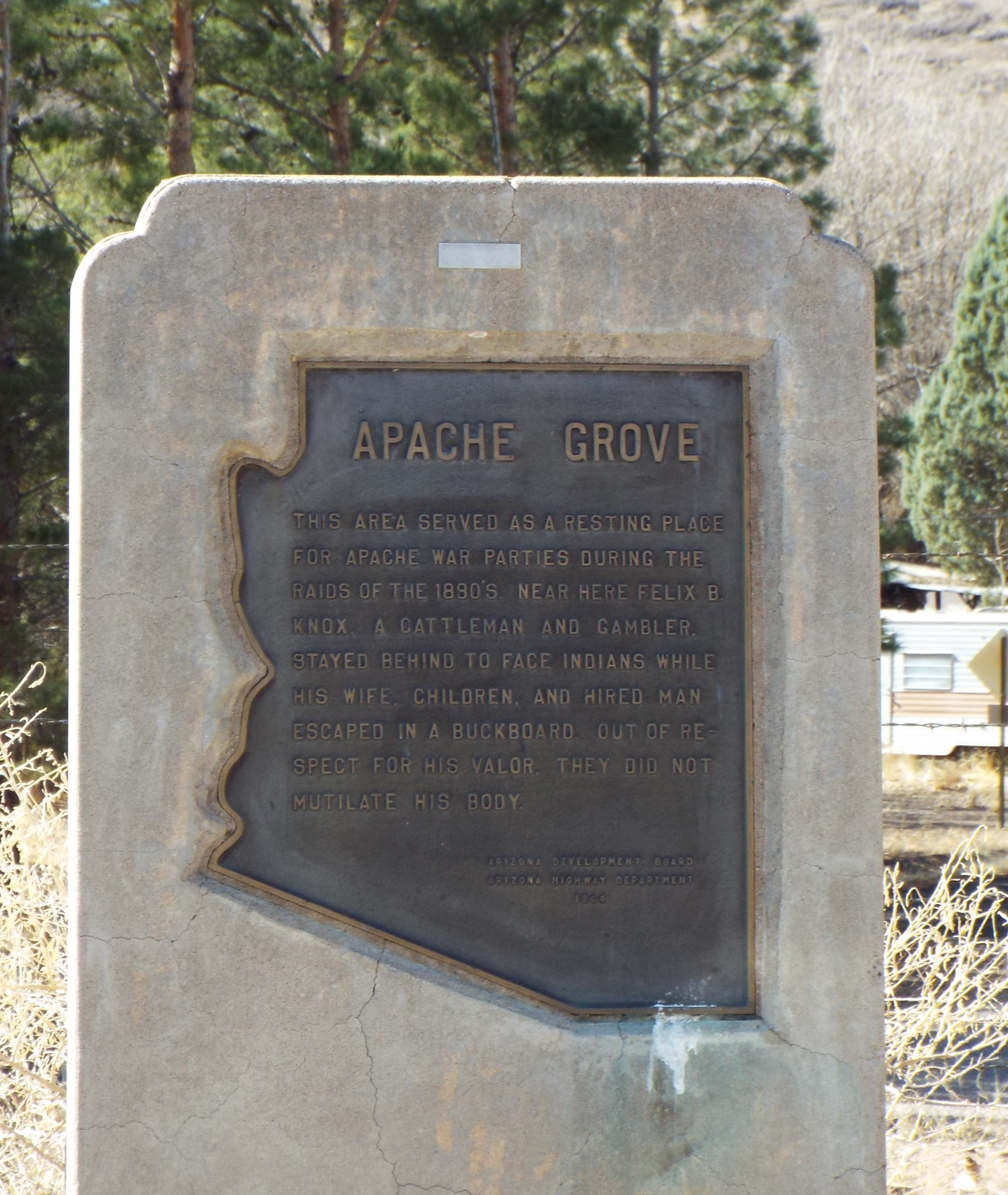
- Apache Grove Marker

- Location within Arizona Location within the United States
- Coordinates: 32°52′11″N 109°11′25″W
- Country: United States
- State: Arizona
- County: Greenlee
- Elevation: 3,550 ft (1,080 m)
- Time zone: UTC-7 (Mountain (MST))
  - Summer (DST): UTC-7 (MST)
- Area code: 520
- FIPS code: 04-02700
- GNIS feature ID: 24305

Apache Grove is a populated place situated in Greenlee County, Arizona, United States. It has an estimated elevation of 3,550 feet (1,080 m) above sea level. The Apache Creek runs through the town and there is a small bar and convenience store north of the creek.

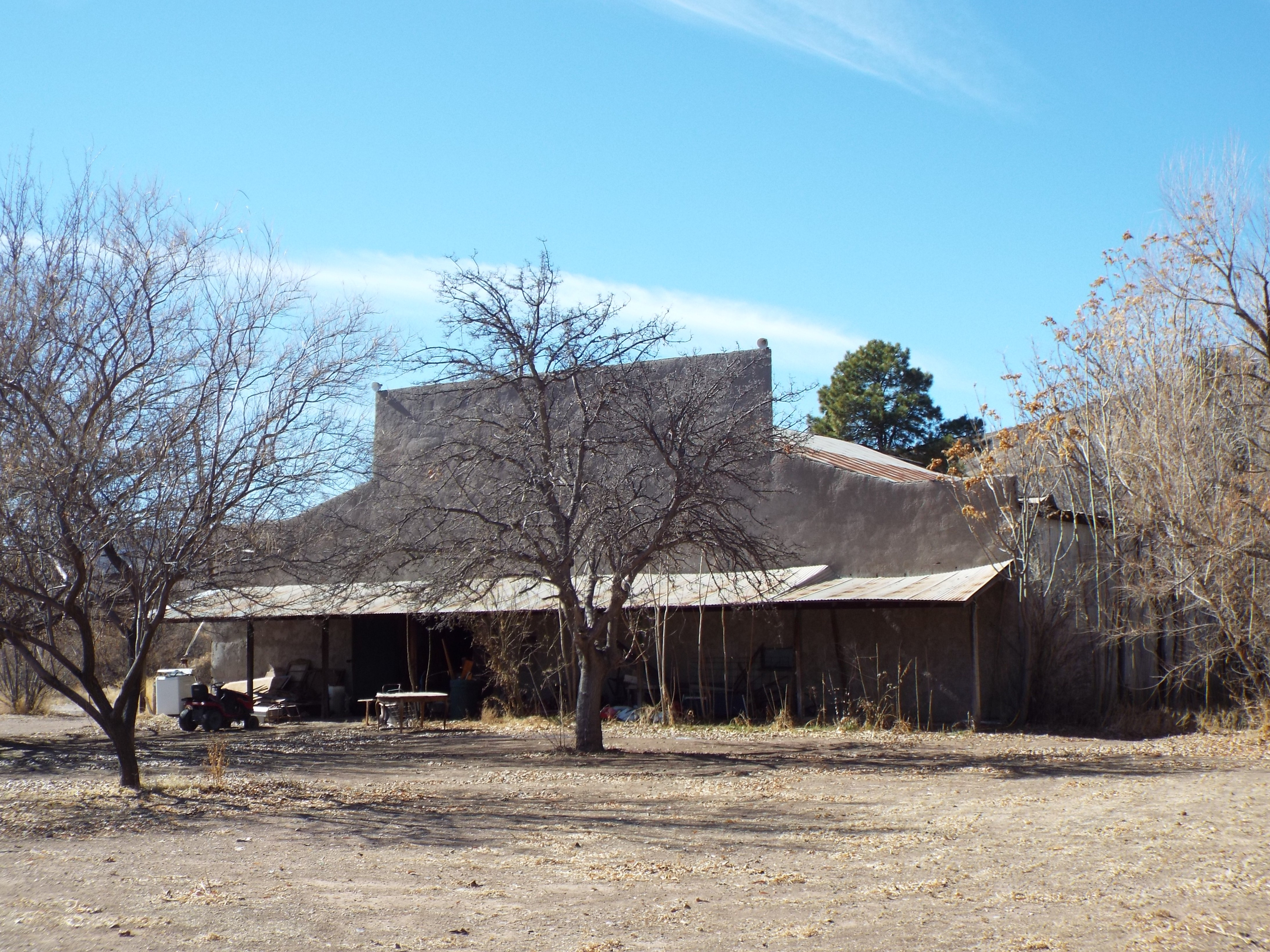
-Apache Grove Dance Hall-1880
