= Springerville, Arizona =

Town in Apache County, Arizona, United States

- Town
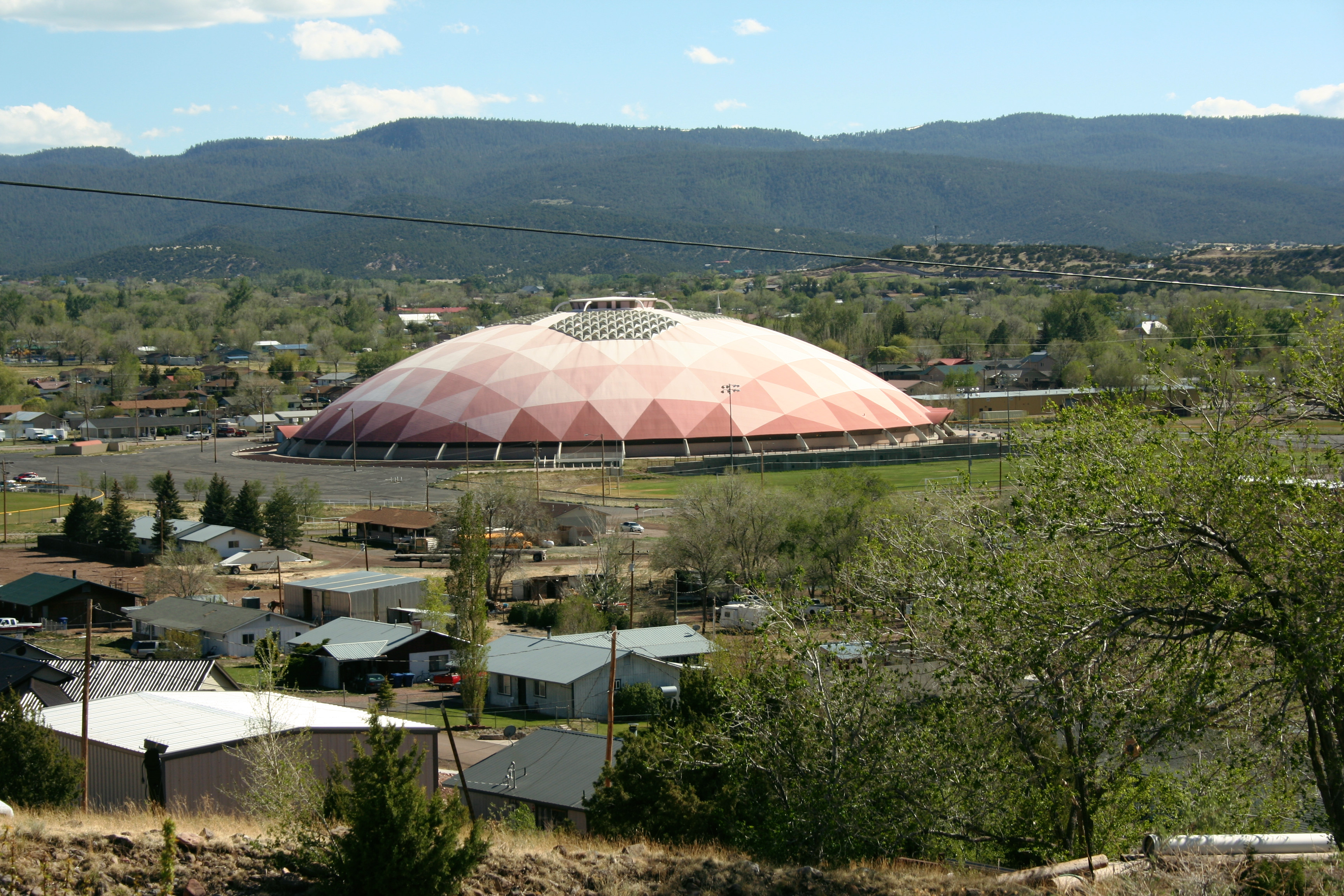
- Aerial view of Springerville

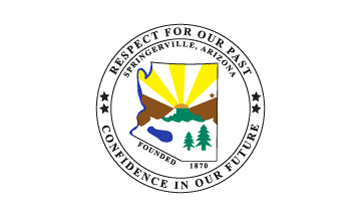
- Flag
- Motto: Respect for our past Confidence in our future
- Location of Springerville in Apache County, Arizona

- Location in the United States
- Coordinates: 34°8′11″N 109°16′45″W
- Country: United States
- State: Arizona
- County: Apache

Government
  - Mayor: Phil Hanson Jr

Area
  - Total: 11.67 sq mi (30.22 km^{2})
  - Land: 11.50 sq mi (29.79 km^{2})
  - Water: 0.16 sq mi (0.42 km^{2})
- Elevation: 6,907 ft (2,105 m)

Population (2020)
  - Total: 1,717
  - Density: 149.3/sq mi (57.63/km^{2})
- Time zone: UTC−7 (MST)
- ZIP Code: 85938
- Area code: 928
- FIPS code: 04-68990
- GNIS feature ID: 2413323
- Website: Town of Springerville

Springerville (Navajo: Tsé Noodǫ́ǫ́z) is a town in Apache County, Arizona, United States, within the White Mountains. Its postal ZIP Code is 85938. As of the 2020 census, Springerville had a population of 1,717.

Springerville sits at an elevation of 6,907 feet (2,105 m) above sea level. Along with its neighbor Eagar, the communities make up the place known as Round Valley, which is in the central-eastern part of Arizona close to the New Mexico border.

== History ==
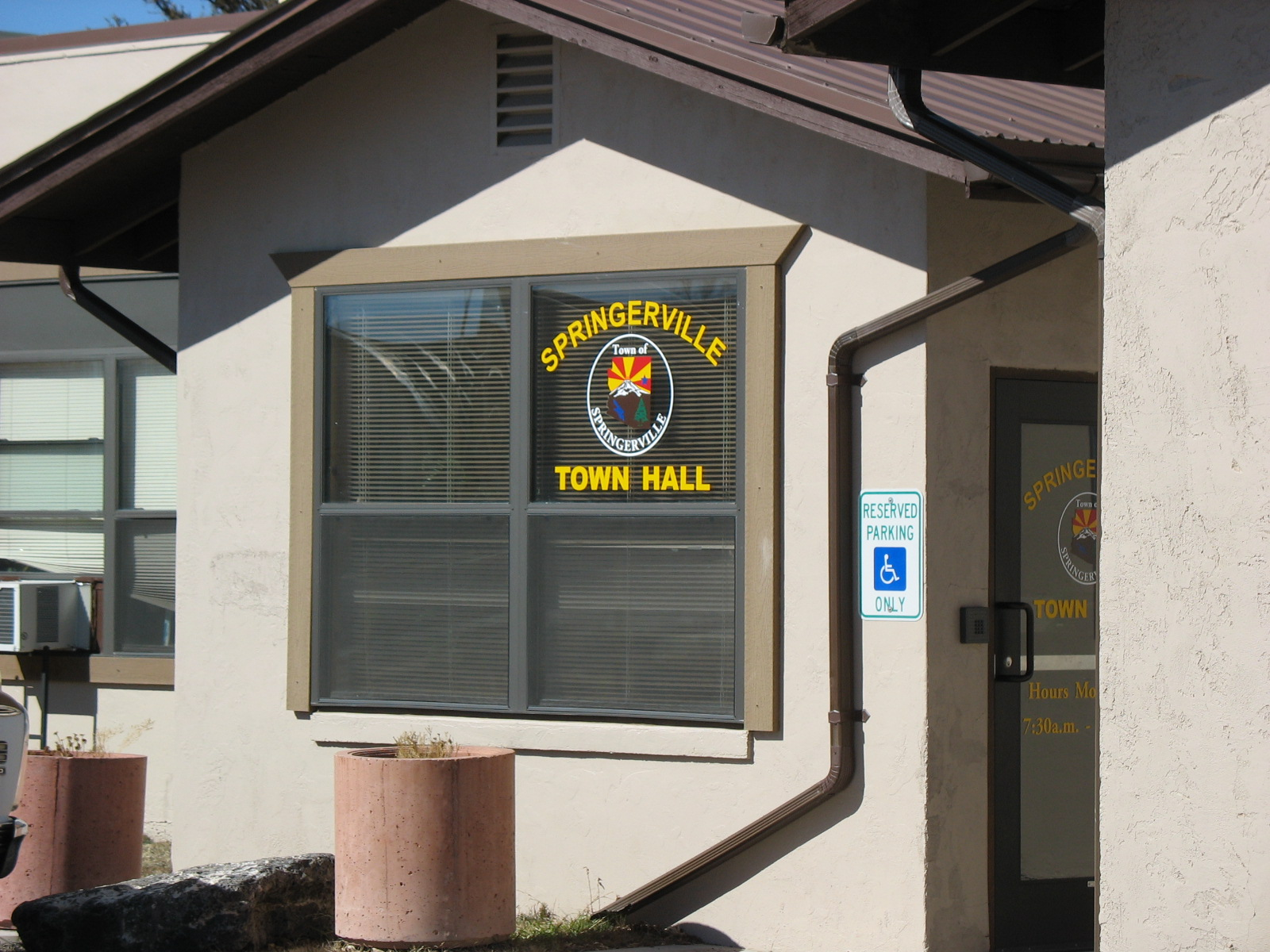
Springerville Town Hall in 2009

The town that grew around Henry Springer's trading post was officially given its name on May 10, 1876. Before that time it had gone by names such as Colorado Chiquito, Milligan Settlement, and Valle Redondo (Round Valley).

Outlaw Cowboy Ike Clanton, who was present at the Gunfight at the O.K. Corral, was shot dead in Springerville on June 1, 1887, by detective Jonas V. Brighton when he resisted arrest on charges of cattle rustling.

Springerville is the home of Arizona's Madonna of the Trail statue, unveiled on September 29, 1928.

The town was incorporated in 1948.

In 1951, Twentieth Century Fox filmed an adaptation of Fred Gipson's novel The Home Place titled Return of the Texan at several locations in and around Springerville.

In June 2011, most of the town was evacuated due to a nearby wildfire. Some stayed and met with each other, alongside residents of Eagar in the round valley dome.

== Geography ==
Springerville is located at 34°8′11″N 109°16′45″W (34.136342, -109.279227).

According to the United States Census Bureau, the town has a total area of 11.7 square miles (30 km^{2}), of which 11.6 square miles (30 km^{2}) is land and 0.1 square miles (0.26 km^{2}), or 1.4%, is water. Springerville has a Mediterranean climate (Köppen Csb).

=== Climate ===
Climate data for Springerville, Arizona (1991–2020 normals, extremes 1911–present)
Month	Jan	Feb	Mar	Apr	May	Jun	Jul	Aug	Sep	Oct	Nov	Dec	Year
Record high °F (°C)	71 (22)	73 (23)	79 (26)	87 (31)	91 (33)	100 (38)	98 (37)	94 (34)	95 (35)	88 (31)	86 (30)	76 (24)	100 (38)
Mean maximum °F (°C)	61.9 (16.6)	65.5 (18.6)	72.0 (22.2)	77.9 (25.5)	84.6 (29.2)	92.3 (33.5)	93.3 (34.1)	89.4 (31.9)	86.0 (30.0)	80.5 (26.9)	71.4 (21.9)	63.7 (17.6)	94.4 (34.7)
Mean daily maximum °F (°C)	50.2 (10.1)	54.3 (12.4)	60.8 (16.0)	67.9 (19.9)	75.8 (24.3)	84.8 (29.3)	85.4 (29.7)	82.6 (28.1)	78.7 (25.9)	70.3 (21.3)	59.6 (15.3)	50.3 (10.2)	68.4 (20.2)
Daily mean °F (°C)	33.1 (0.6)	36.8 (2.7)	42.1 (5.6)	48.4 (9.1)	56.0 (13.3)	64.6 (18.1)	68.7 (20.4)	66.6 (19.2)	60.9 (16.1)	50.9 (10.5)	40.7 (4.8)	33.1 (0.6)	50.2 (10.1)
Mean daily minimum °F (°C)	16.1 (−8.8)	19.3 (−7.1)	23.4 (−4.8)	29.0 (−1.7)	36.3 (2.4)	44.5 (6.9)	51.9 (11.1)	50.6 (10.3)	43.1 (6.2)	31.5 (−0.3)	21.8 (−5.7)	16.0 (−8.9)	32.0 (0.0)
Mean minimum °F (°C)	−1.7 (−18.7)	2.1 (−16.6)	7.7 (−13.5)	13.6 (−10.2)	22.4 (−5.3)	32.1 (0.1)	41.6 (5.3)	41.8 (5.4)	29.1 (−1.6)	15.8 (−9.0)	3.9 (−15.6)	−2.7 (−19.3)	−6.8 (−21.6)
Record low °F (°C)	−25 (−32)	−22 (−30)	−13 (−25)	5 (−15)	12 (−11)	15 (−9)	29 (−2)	32 (0)	20 (−7)	3 (−16)	−17 (−27)	−28 (−33)	−28 (−33)
Average precipitation inches (mm)	0.49 (12)	0.49 (12)	0.41 (10)	0.28 (7.1)	0.40 (10)	0.41 (10)	2.56 (65)	2.87 (73)	1.45 (37)	0.90 (23)	0.53 (13)	0.57 (14)	11.36 (289)
Average snowfall inches (cm)	1.0 (2.5)	0.9 (2.3)	0.0 (0.0)	0.0 (0.0)	0.0 (0.0)	0.0 (0.0)	0.0 (0.0)	0.0 (0.0)	0.0 (0.0)	0.4 (1.0)	0.4 (1.0)	0.5 (1.3)	3.2 (8.1)
Average precipitation days (≥ 0.01 inch)	4.1	4.0	3.8	2.4	3.4	3.0	12.6	12.5	6.7	4.2	3.3	3.7	63.7
Average snowy days (≥ 0.1 in)	0.5	0.2	0.0	0.1	0.0	0.0	0.0	0.0	0.0	0.1	0.2	0.5	1.6
Source: NOAA

== Demographics ==
Historical population
Census	Pop.	Note	%±
1880	364		—
1890	443		21.7%
1910	296		—
1920	479		61.8%
1930	565		18.0%
1950	689		—
1960	719		4.4%
1970	1,151		60.1%
1980	1,452		26.2%
1990	1,802		24.1%
2000	1,972		9.4%
2010	1,961		−0.6%
2020	1,717		−12.4%
U.S. Decennial Census

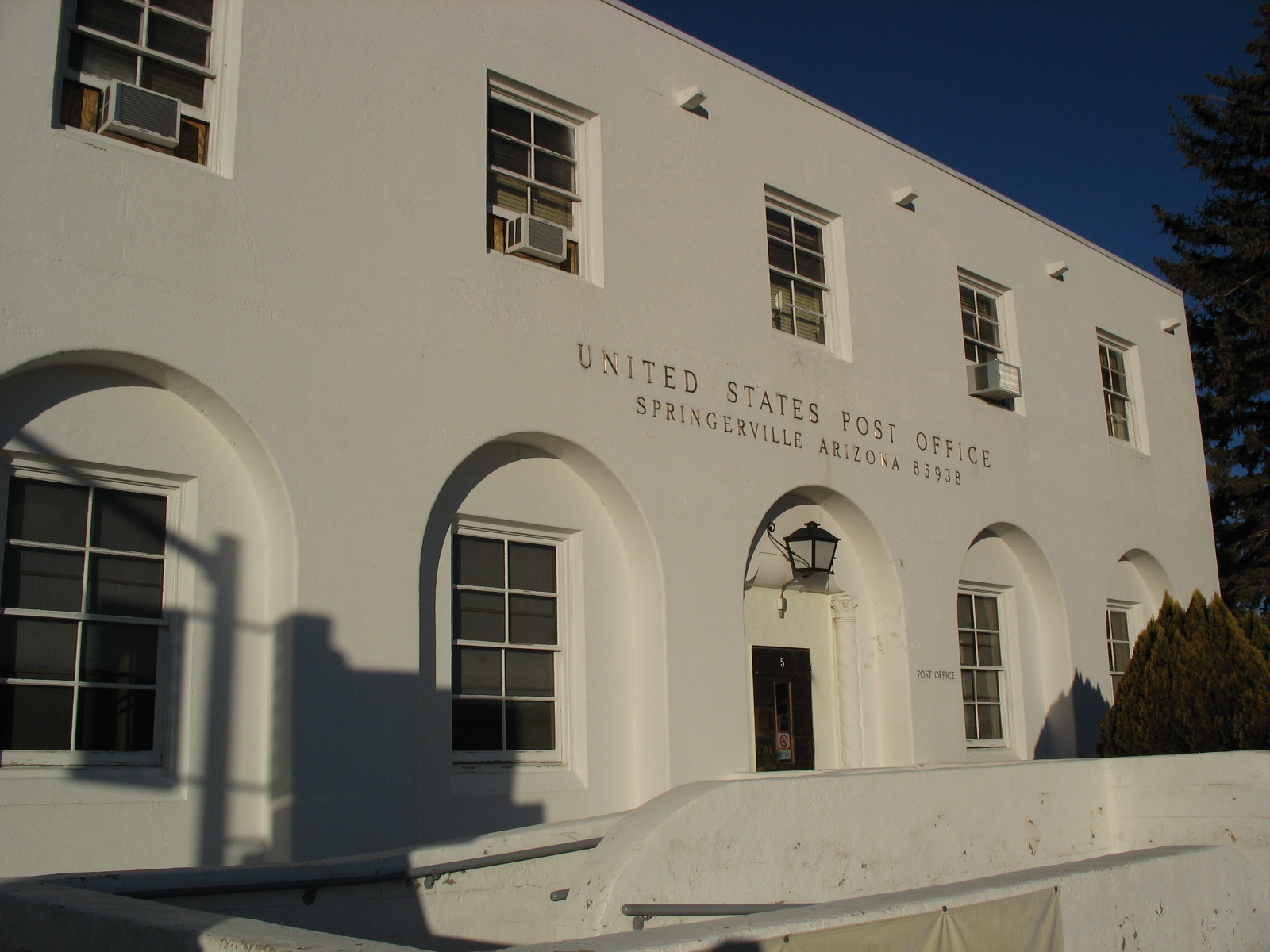
Springerville Post Office with postal code 85938

=== 2020 census ===
As of the 2020 census, Springerville had a population of 1,717. The median age was 42.6 years. 22.4% of residents were under the age of 18 and 20.9% of residents were 65 years of age or older. For every 100 females there were 97.4 males, and for every 100 females age 18 and over there were 97.6 males age 18 and over.

0.0% of residents lived in urban areas, while 100.0% lived in rural areas.

There were 746 households in Springerville, of which 30.3% had children under the age of 18 living in them. Of all households, 41.8% were married-couple households, 23.5% were households with a male householder and no spouse or partner present, and 27.3% were households with a female householder and no spouse or partner present. About 32.9% of all households were made up of individuals and 15.2% had someone living alone who was 65 years of age or older.

There were 881 housing units, of which 15.3% were vacant. The homeowner vacancy rate was 1.6% and the rental vacancy rate was 5.6%.

Racial composition as of the 2020 census
Race	Number	Percent
White	1,272	74.1%
Black or African American	2	0.1%
American Indian and Alaska Native	86	5.0%
Asian	6	0.3%
Native Hawaiian and Other Pacific Islander	0	0.0%
Some other race	152	8.9%
Two or more races	199	11.6%
Hispanic or Latino (of any race)	453	26.4%

=== 2000 census ===
As of the census of 2000, there were 1,972 people, 753 households, and 499 families residing in the town. The population density was 170.8 inhabitants per square mile (65.9/km^{2}). There were 896 housing units at an average density of 77.6 per square mile (30.0/km^{2}). The racial makeup of the town was 79.5% White, 0.2% Black or African American, 6.5% Native American, 0.4% Asian, 0.1% Pacific Islander, 10.2% from other races, and 3.0% from two or more races. 25.2% of the population were Hispanic or Latino of any race.

There were 753 households, out of which 34.3% had children under the age of 18 living with them, 50.6% were married couples living together, 11.2% had a female householder with no husband present, and 33.7% were non-families. 30.1% of all households were made up of individuals, and 14.7% had someone living alone who was 65 years of age or older. The average household size was 2.55 and the average family size was 3.18.

In the town, the age distribution of the population shows 29.2% under the age of 18, 7.6% from 18 to 24, 25.2% from 25 to 44, 23.4% from 45 to 64, and 14.6% who were 65 years of age or older. The median age was 37 years. For every 100 females, there were 94.9 males. For every 100 females age 18 and over, there were 88.4 males.

The median income for a household in the town was $30,769, and the median income for a family was $36,331. Males had a median income of $32,313 versus $19,519 for females. The per capita income for the town was $13,830. About 14.7% of families and 21.0% of the population were below the poverty line, including 25.4% of those under age 18 and 26.1% of those age 65 or over.

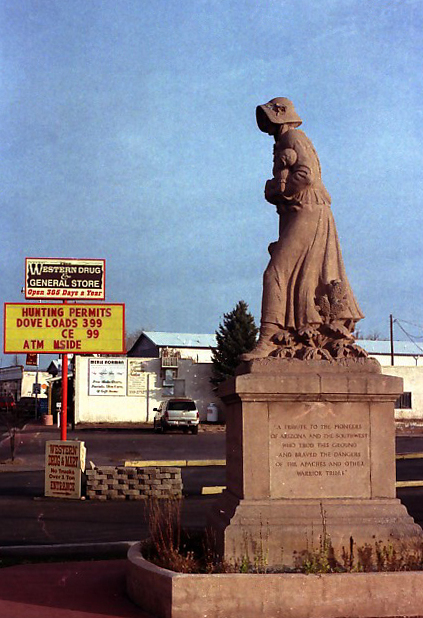
A Madonna of the Trail monument in Springerville

== Education ==
The town is served by the Round Valley Unified School District. The school's mascot is the elk and its school colors are black and gold. The St. Johns Redskins are the school's biggest rival.

Round Valley Primary School is located in the town and serves the town.

Round Valley Intermediate School, Round Valley Middle School, and Round Valley High School serve the town, but are in nearby Eagar. In addition, White Mountain Academy, a K–12 charter school, is located in Eagar.

The high school's football stadium, The Round Valley Ensphere located in Eagar, is the eighth biggest geodesic dome in the world with a diameter of 440 feet / 134 m. The school board voted to give the Dome a pinkish looking color, and it was completed in 1992. It was used as a shelter for evacuees from the Rodeo–Chediski Fire in 2002. Round Valley is the only high school in the world to have a domed stadium.

The first Springerville School House was dedicated September 3, 1884.

In 1969, the Springerville, Eagar, Vernon, Nutrioso, Greer, and Colter Schools consolidated with each other to form the Round Valley Unified School District.

== Transportation ==
The Springerville Municipal Airport is a town-owned public-use airport located one nautical mile (1.85 km) west of the central business district of Springerville.

BNSF Railway provides freight service to the Springerville generating station on its Springerville subdivision.

The Town of Springerville provides transportation for low-income residents to Show Low twice per month.

== Economy ==
Tucson Electric Power operates the Springerville Generating Station in Springerville.

== Attractions ==
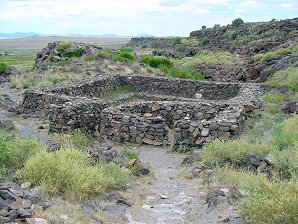
The Kiva at Casa Malpaís

Casa Malpaís is located near Springerville. It is a nationally recognized archeological site.

The name Casa Malpais means "House built from Malapai", which describes the type volcanic vesicular basalt from which the ancient village was constructed. It is thought that the name was given to the village by early Basque sheepherders. The Springerville volcanic field contains over 400 volcanoes within a 50-mile (80 km) radius of Springerville, making it the third largest volcanic field in the continental United States.

The first visit to Casa Malpais by a professional anthropologist was in 1883, when Frank Cushing, living at Zuni, visited a site at "El Valle Redondo on the Colorado Chiquito", and was impressed by what he termed "the fissure type pueblo" he found there. In his journal he sketched dry masonry, bridging fissures, upon which the pueblo is constructed.

Unique and unusual features characterize the site. The Great Kiva, painstakingly constructed of volcanic rock, is the centerpiece. A steep basalt staircase set into a crevice of the high red cliff wall leads to the top of the mesa.

Both the Hopi and Zuni people still consider Casa Malpais a sacred ancestral place.

The town contains one of the twelve Madonna of the Trail monuments created by sculptor August Leimbach.

The town is close to the Apache–Sitgreaves National Forests, which run along the Mogollon Rim. It is also close to the Sunrise Ski Resort.

The El Rio opened in 1915, making it the oldest movie theater in Arizona. It was originally called the Apache Theater, until it was changed in 1937 to the El Rio.

== Notable people ==
- Mark Gastineau, former football player for the New York Jets
- Alex Madrid, baseball player for the Milwaukee Brewers and Philadelphia Phillies
- Billie Maxwell, credited with being the first female singer to record country music
- Jerry D. Thompson, historian of the American Southwest, was born in Springerville.
- Daniel I. J. Thornton, the governor of Colorado from 1951 to 1955, operated a ranch near Springerville in the late 1930s.

== Quotes ==
"I was the one who had Apache county separated from Yavapai. Everything was very high at that time, and I used to haul my goods from Albuquerque to live on. I was hauling goods one time from Henry Springer's store in Albuquerque, and I told Henry Springer he had better come into Round Valley, as it was called then, and put in a store; that the people were coming in and we would name the postoffice and little village after him, Springerville, and that was old Henry Springer."
——James G. H. Colter from History of Arizona, Volume VI

== See also ==
- Transfer Station Fire
- Wallow Fire
