= Eagle Elementary School District =

School district in Arizona, United States

Location
- Clifton postal address, Arizona, 85533; United States
- Coordinates: 33.45°N 109.37°W

District information
- Type: Public
- NCES District ID: 0400607

Eagle Elementary School District 45 is a school district in Greenlee County, Arizona. As of 2025 the district does not operate any schools.

The district formerly operated Eagle Elementary School, located in the Apache National Forest. In 1986, 11 students were enrolled. The size of the facility was two times that of the Blue Elementary School. At the time, the school had received two Apple IIC computers so the students would have access to technology. Alan Thurber of the Arizona Republic stated that both Eagle and Blue schools were "Technically[...]not one-room schools." In 1991 it was described by Joe Salkowski of the Arizona Daily Star as one of five publicly-operated one-room schoolhouses in the southeastern part of the state. Bruce D. Itule in Arizona Highways described it as one of Arizona's eight one-room schoolhouses.

In 1991 the school had a satellite dish and an internal restroom facility, but there was also an outhouse if the school's pipes froze. That year, the school held classes four days per week so parents would not have to drive as often.

In 2016, according to the National Center for Education Statistics, Eagle ES was still active. By 2022, Eagle ES had closed.
