= Guthrie, Arizona =

Populated place and ghost town in Greenlee County

- Populated Place
- Location within the state of Arizona Guthrie (the United States)
- Coordinates: 32°56′46″N 109°15′11″W
- Country: United States
- State: Arizona
- County: Greenlee
- Elevation: 3,435 ft (1,047 m)
- Time zone: UTC-7 (Mountain (MST))
  - Summer (DST): UTC-7 (MST)
- Area code: 928
- FIPS code: 04-30620
- GNIS feature ID: 24445

Guthrie is a ghost town in Greenlee County, Arizona, United States.
