= List of high school football stadiums by capacity =

Wikimedia list article

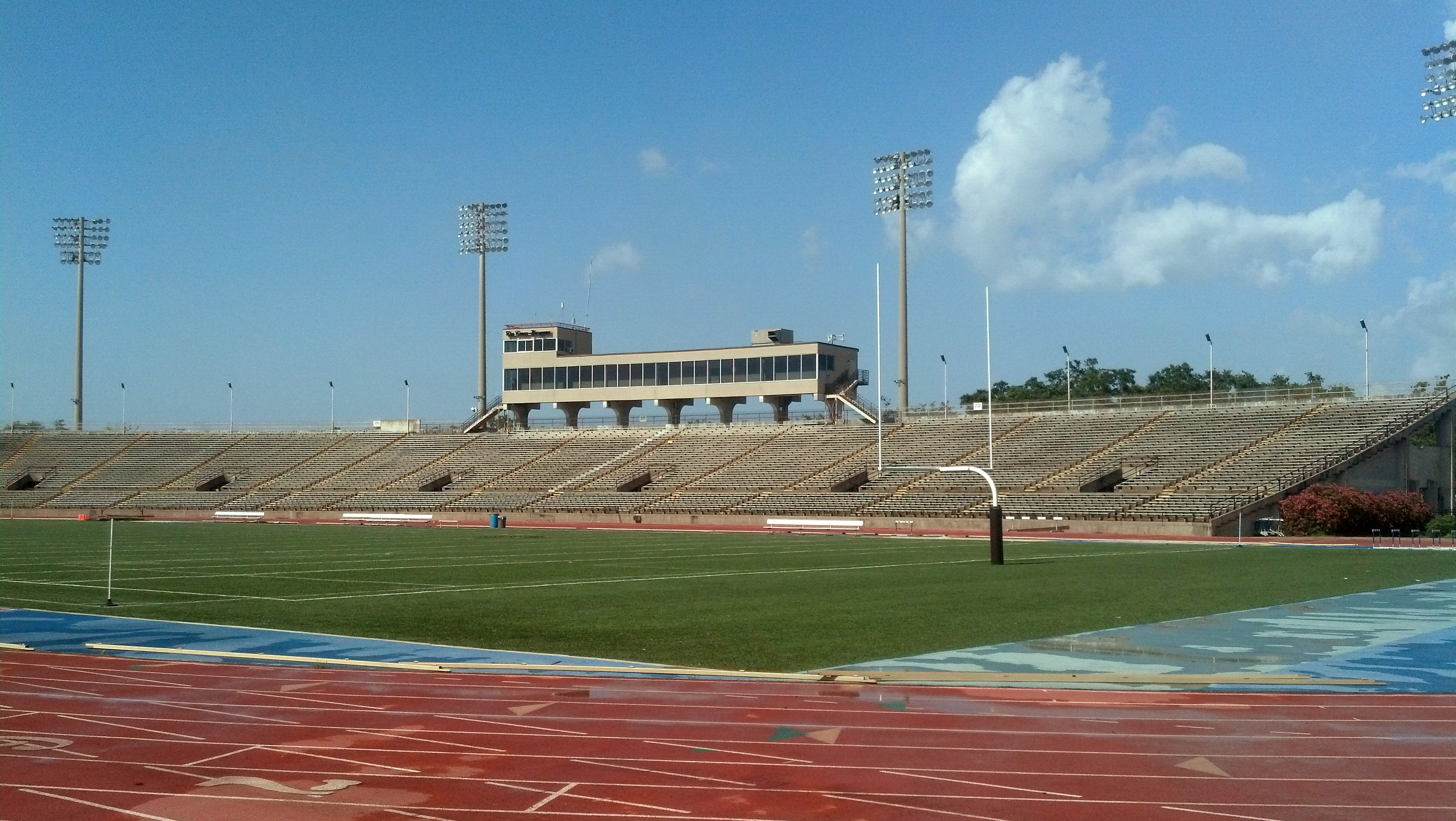
Tad Gormley Stadium in New Orleans, Louisiana, the nation's largest high school stadium with a capacity of 26,500

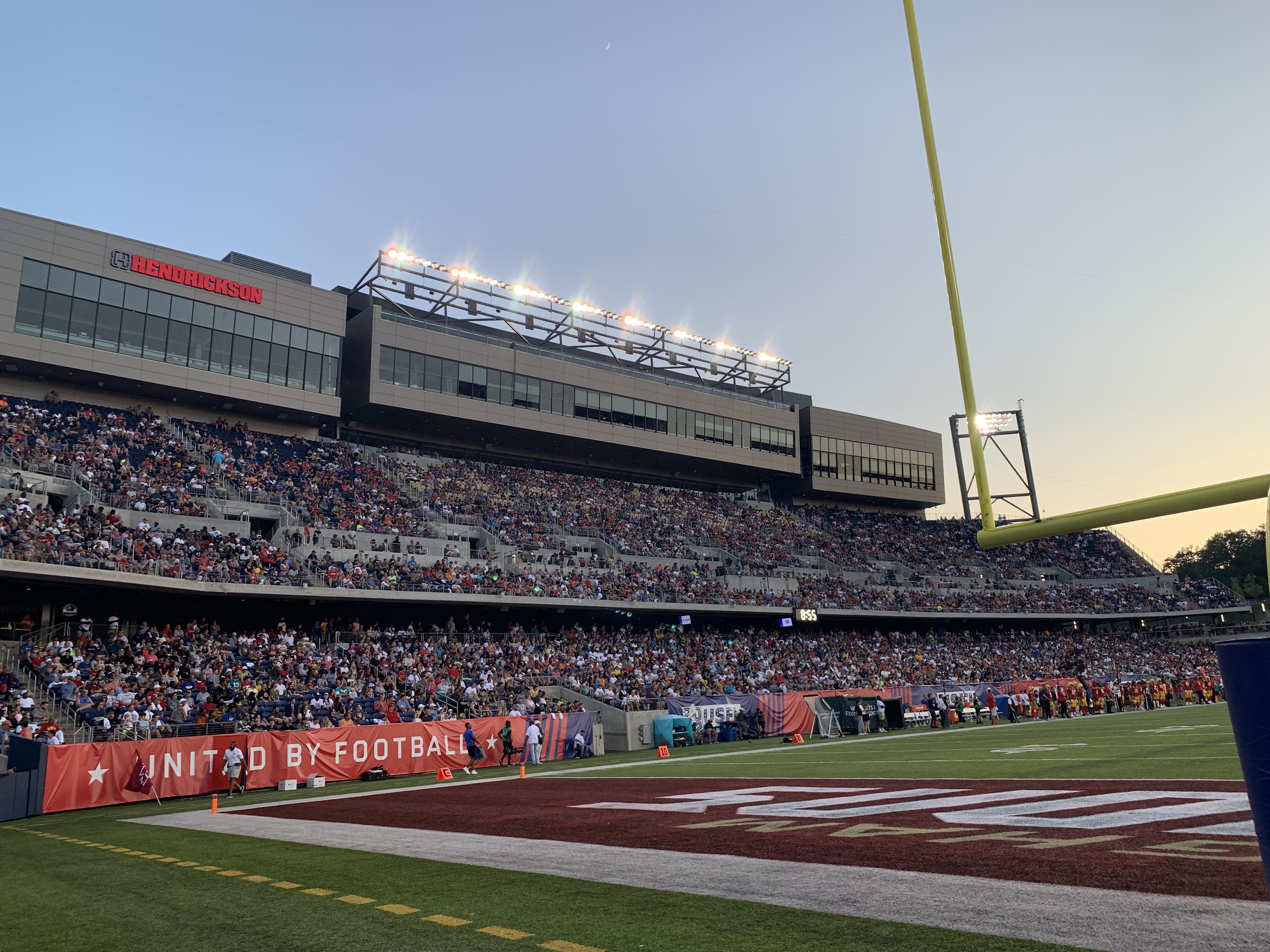
Tom Benson Hall of Fame Stadium in Canton, Ohio

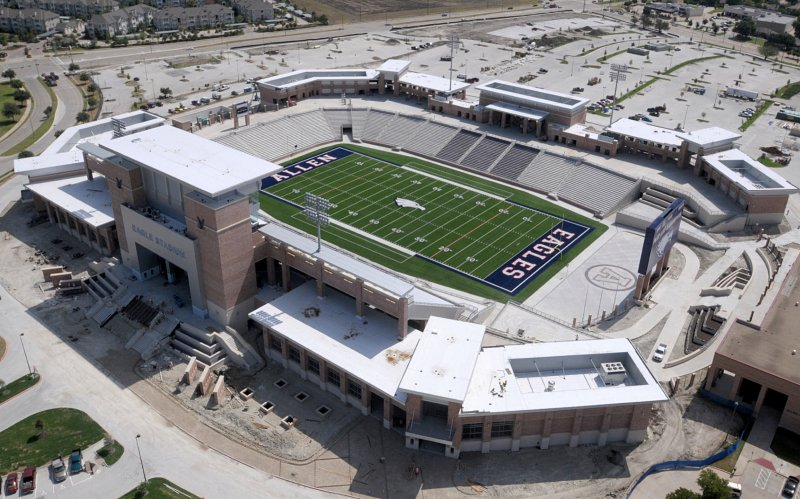
Eagle Stadium in Allen, Texas

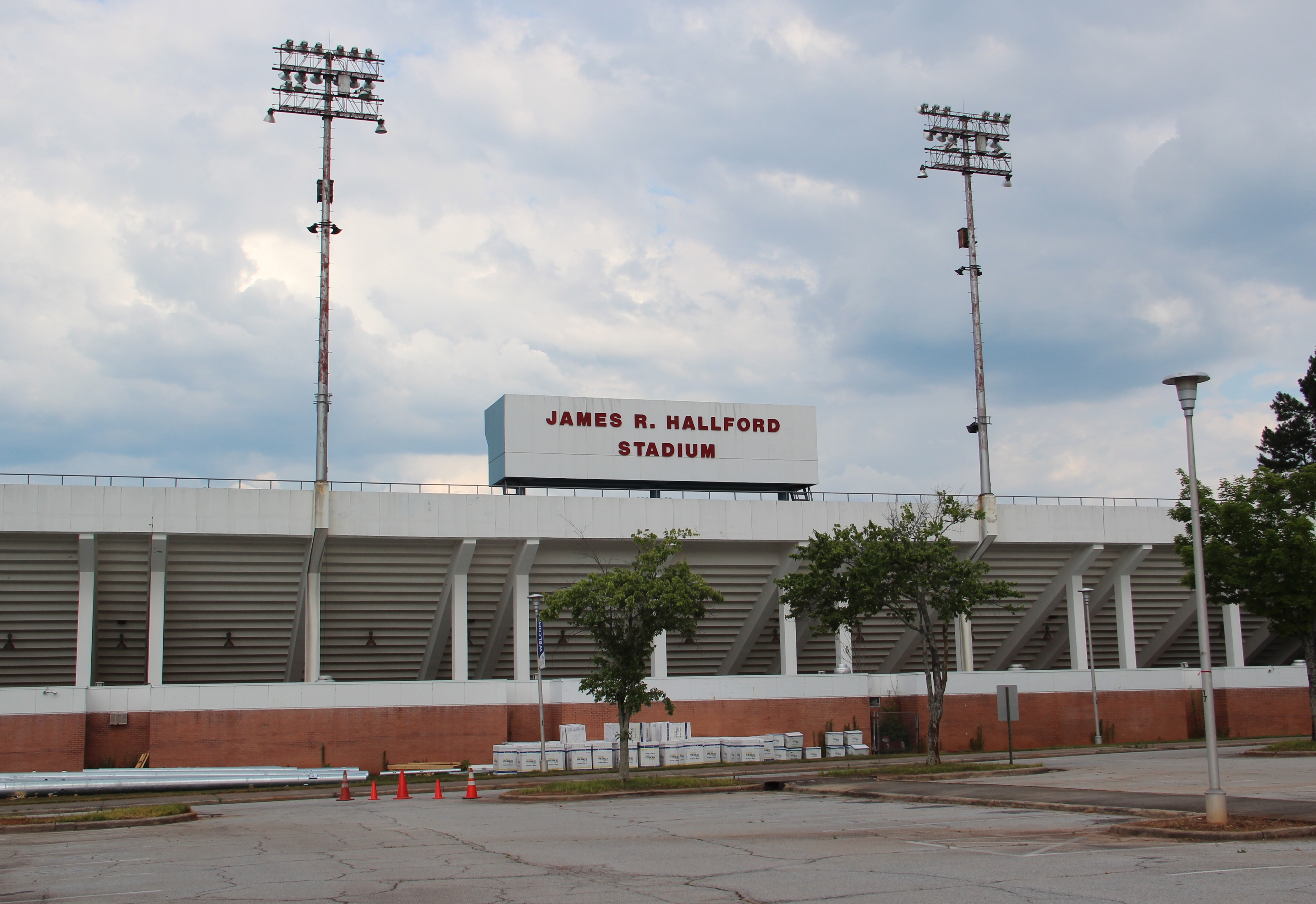
James R. Hallford Stadium in Clarkston, Georgia

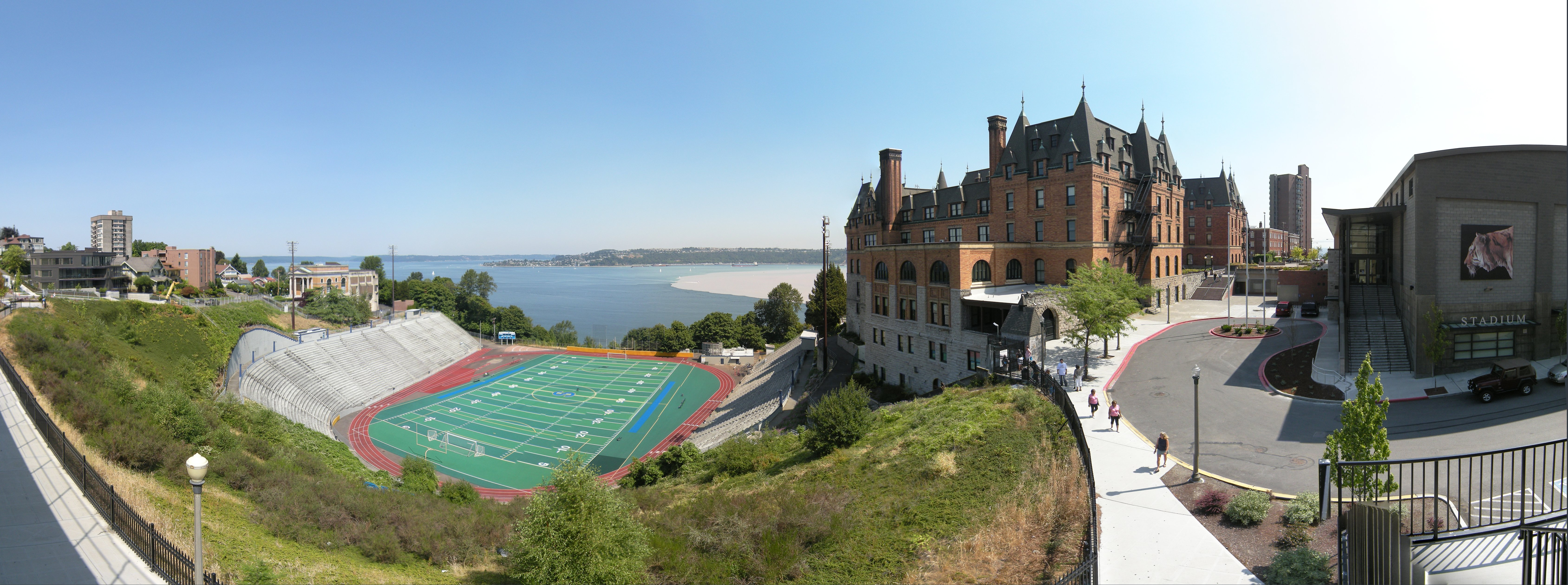
Stadium Bowl in Tacoma, Washington

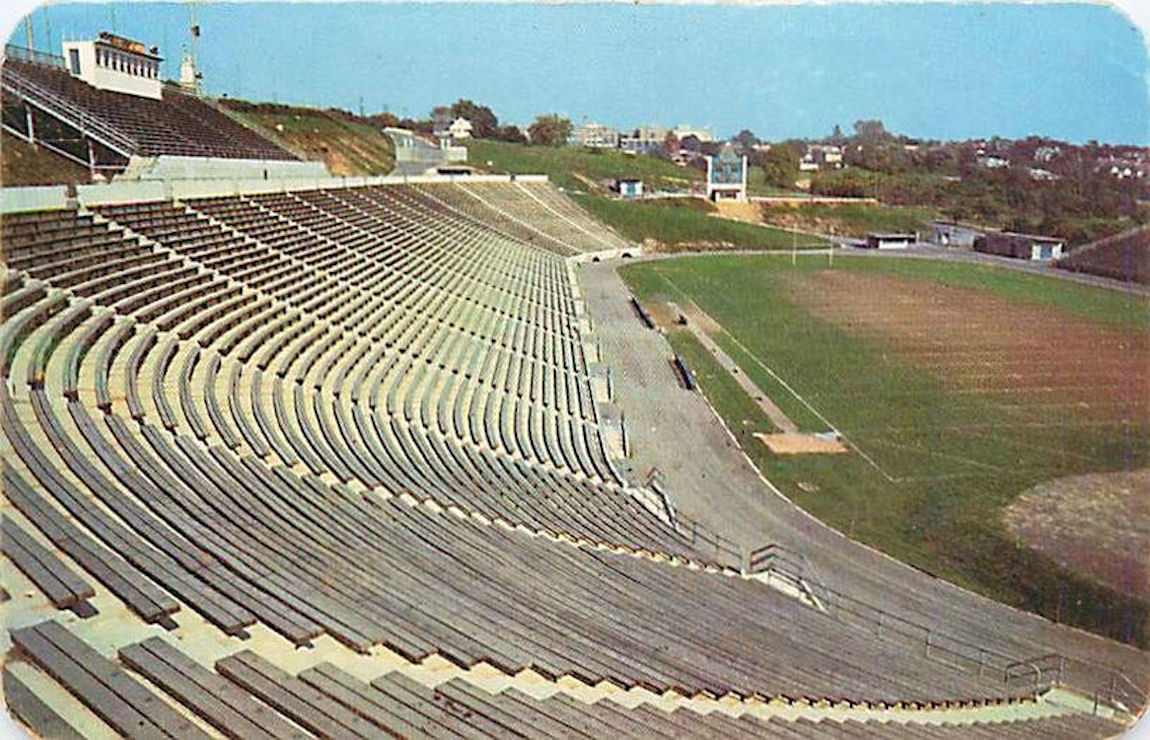
J. Birney Crum Stadium in Allentown, Pennsylvania

The following is a list of the largest high school football stadiums in the United States, including stadiums with a capacity of at least 10,000.

Location	Stadium	Capacity
New Orleans, Louisiana	Tad Gormley Stadium	26,500
Wailuku, Hawaii	War Memorial Stadium	23,000
Canton, Ohio	Tom Benson Hall of Fame Stadium	22,400
Baton Rouge, Louisiana	BREC Memorial Stadium	21,395
Canyon, Texas	Happy State Bank Stadium	20,000
Mesquite, Texas	Mesquite Memorial Stadium	20,000
San Antonio, Texas	Alamo Stadium	18,500
Allen, Texas	Eagle Stadium	18,000
Odessa, Texas	Ratliff Stadium	17,931
San Angelo, Texas	San Angelo Stadium	17,550
Pendleton, Oregon	Pendleton Round-Up Arena	17,000
Massillon, Ohio	Paul Brown Tiger Stadium	16,392
Clarkston, Georgia	James R. Hallford Stadium	15,600
Roebuck, South Carolina	Cavalier Stadium	15,200
High Point, North Carolina	A.J. Simeon Stadium	15,000
Cedar Rapids, Iowa	Kingston Stadium	15,000
Tacoma, Washington	Stadium Bowl	15,000
Little Rock, Arkansas	Quigley Stadium	15,000
Hobbs, New Mexico	Watson Memorial Stadium	15,000
Allentown, Pennsylvania	J. Birney Crum Stadium	15,000
Cumberland, Maryland	Greenway Avenue Stadium	15,000
Elberton, Georgia	Granite Bowl	15,000
Garland, Texas	Homer B. Johnson Stadium	15,000
Wichita Falls, Texas	Memorial Stadium (Wichita Falls)	14,500
Bethlehem, Pennsylvania	Bethlehem Area School District Stadium	14,000
Meridian, Mississippi	Ray Stadium	14,000
McAllen, Texas	McAllen Veterans Memorial Stadium	13,500
Shreveport, Louisiana	Lee Hedges Stadium	13,400
Carrollton, Texas	Tommy Standridge Stadium	13,000
Broken Arrow, Oklahoma	Tiger Memorial Stadium	13,000
Pueblo, Colorado	Dutch Clark Stadium	12,500
Irving, Texas	Joy and Ralph Ellis Stadium	12,500
Bedford, Texas	Pennington Field	12,500
San Benito, Texas	Bobby Morrow Stadium	12,000
Austin, Texas	Burger Stadium	12,000
Bridgeport, Connecticut	John F. Kennedy Stadium	12,000
Brunswick, Georgia	Glynn County Stadium	12,000
Denton, Texas	CH Collins Stadium	12,000
Houston, Texas	Jones-Cowart Stadium	12,000
Katy, Texas	Mike Johnson Field	12,000
Pasadena, Texas	Veterans Memorial Stadium	12,000
Powder Springs, Georgia	Cantrell Stadium	12,000
Prosper, Texas	Children's Health Stadium	12,000
Tifton, Georgia	Brodie Field	12,000
Warner Robins, Georgia	Freedom Field	12,000
Waycross, Georgia	Memorial Stadium	12,000
Albany, Georgia	Hugh Mills Stadium	11,500
Louisville, Kentucky	Manual Stadium	11,500
Valdosta, Georgia	Bazemore-Hyder Stadium	11,249
West Monroe, Louisiana	Don Shows Field at Rebel Stadium	11,200
Cypress, Texas	Cy-Fair FCU Stadium	11,000
Austin, Texas	Kelly Reeves Stadium	11,000
Evansville, Indiana	Reitz Bowl	12,000
Commerce, Texas	Memorial Stadium	11,000
Tulsa, Oklahoma	Union-Tuttle Stadium	11,000
Warren, Ohio	Mollenkopf Stadium	11,000
Valdosta, Georgia	Martin Stadium	11,000
Flint, Michigan	Atwood Stadium	11,000
Augusta, Georgia	Butler Stadium	10,400
San Antonio, Texas	Dub Farris Stadium	10,000
Dallas, Texas	Forester Stadium	10,000
San Antonio, Texas	Jerry Comalander Stadium	10,000
Harlingen, Texas	J. Lewis Boggus Stadium	10,000
Miami, Florida	Nathaniel "Traz" Powell Stadium	10,000
Bluefield, West Virginia	Mitchell Stadium	10,000
Brownsville, Texas	Sams Memorial Stadium	10,000
Corsicana, Texas	Tiger Stadium	10,000
New Braunfels, Texas	Unicorn Stadium	10,000
Sioux Falls, South Dakota	Howard Wood Field	10,000
Waller, Texas	Waller ISD Stadium	10,000
Melissa, Texas	Coach Kenny Deel Stadium	10,000
Greensboro, North Carolina	Jamieson Stadium	10,000
San Francisco, California	Kezar Stadium	10,000
Atlanta, Georgia	Lakewood Stadium	10,000
Macon, Georgia	Ed DeFore Sports Complex	10,000
La Porte, Texas	Bulldog Stadium	10,000

== See also ==
- List of largest high school gyms in the United States
