= 1912 United States presidential election in Arizona =

- November 5, 1912

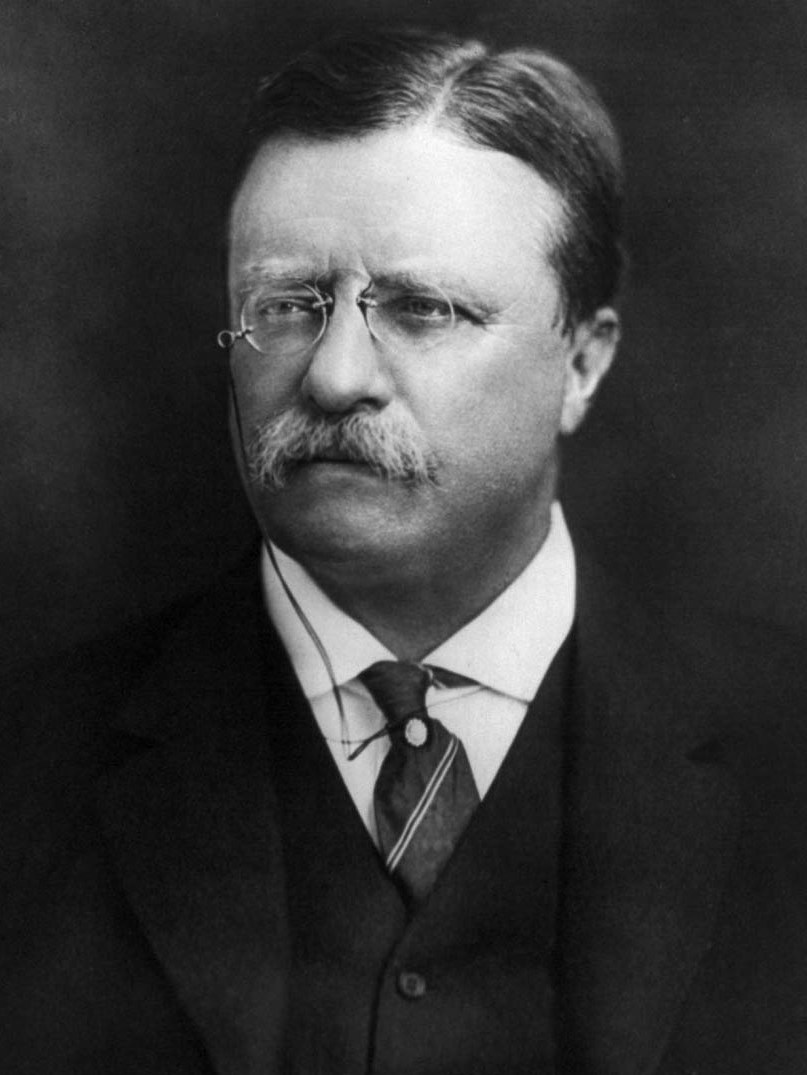

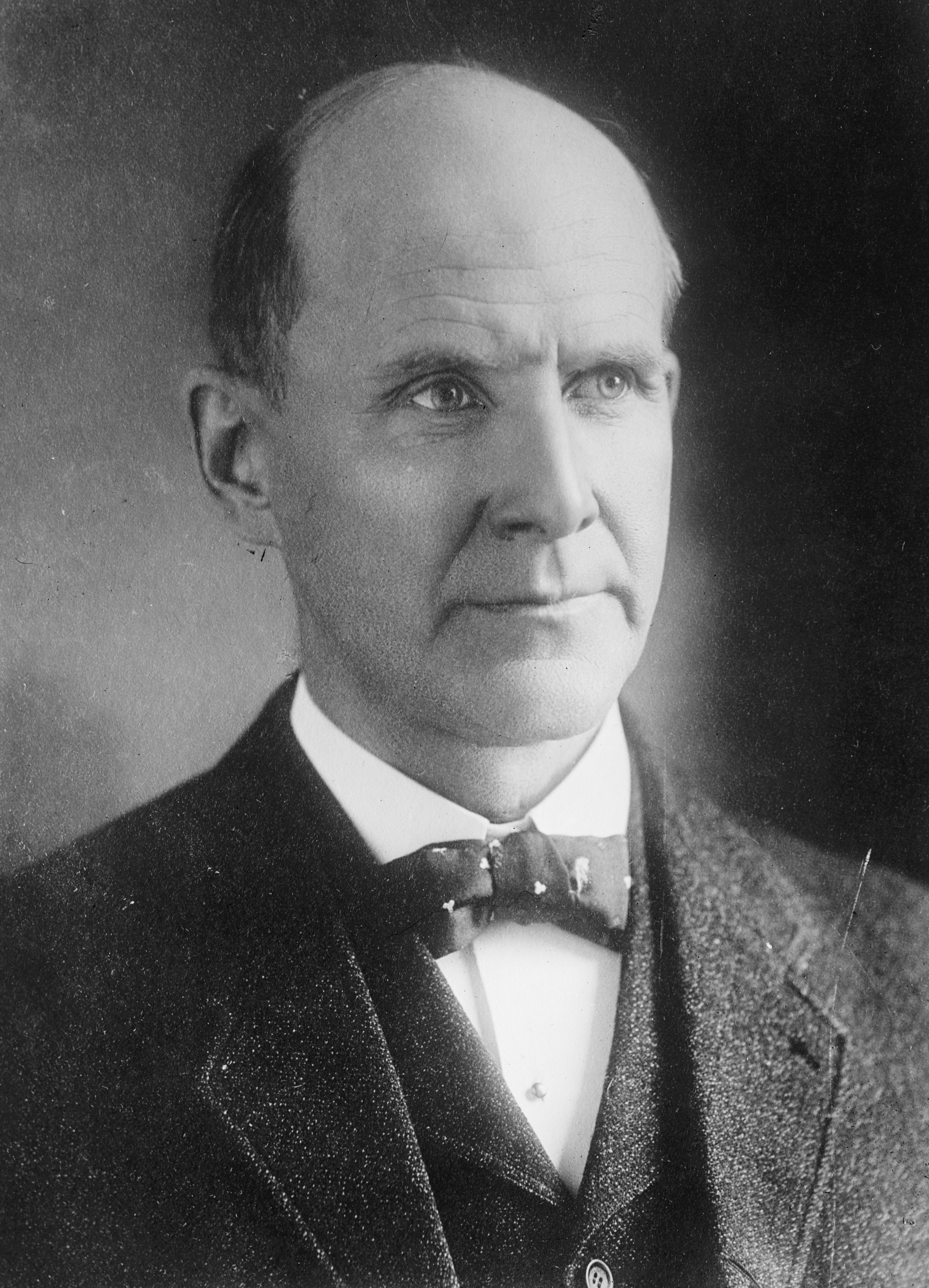

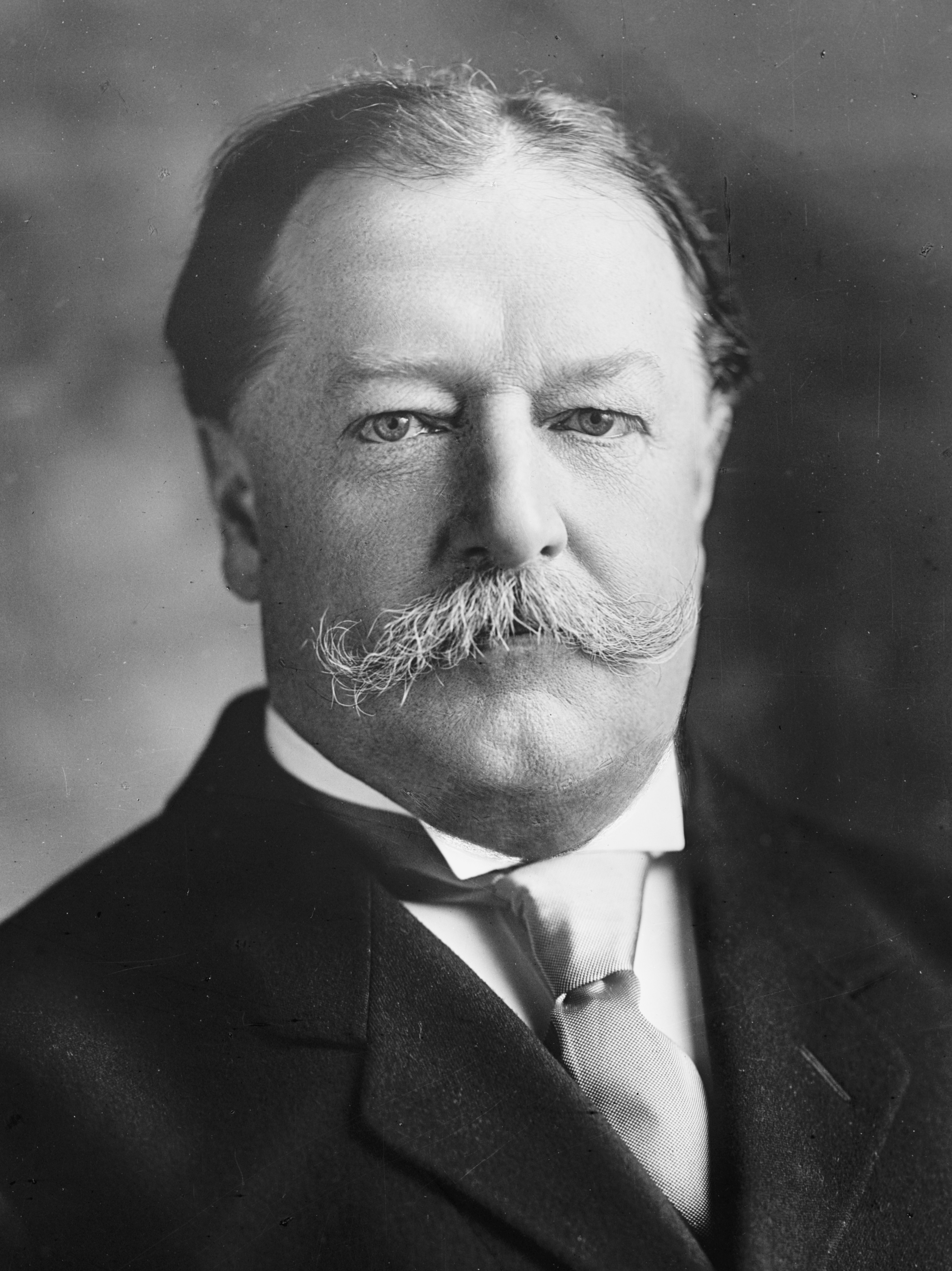
Nominee	Woodrow Wilson	Theodore Roosevelt
Party	Democratic	Progressive
Home state	New Jersey	New York
Running mate	Thomas R. Marshall	Hiram Johnson
Electoral vote	3	0
Popular vote	10,324	6,949
Percentage	43.52%	29.29%
Nominee	Eugene V. Debs	William Howard Taft
Party	Socialist	Republican
Home state	Indiana	Ohio
Running mate	Emil Seidel	Nicholas M. Butler
Electoral vote	0	0
Popular vote	3,163	3,021
Percentage	13.33%	12.74%
County results
Wilson
30–40%
40–50%
50–60%
President before election
William Howard Taft
Republican
Elected President
Woodrow Wilson
Democratic

The 1912 United States presidential election in Arizona took place on November 5, 1912, as part of the 1912 United States presidential election. State voters chose three representatives, or electors, to the Electoral College, who voted for president and vice president. In Arizona, voters voted for electors individually instead of as a state, as in the other states.

This was the first presidential election Arizona participated in, as it had been admitted as the 48th state on February 14 of the same year. The state was won by Democratic Governor of New Jersey Woodrow Wilson, running with Indiana Governor Thomas R. Marshall, with 43.52% of the popular vote. Wilson defeated three other major candidates including former progressive Republican President Theodore Roosevelt who ran under the Progressive Party challenging then current Republican conservative President William Howard Taft and earning nearly 29% of the total vote. Another third-party candidate, Eugene V. Debs ran under the Socialist Party of America garnering a large left wing voting base of 13%. President Taft finished fourth place at under 13% of the popular vote, the lowest support for a Republican nominee in Arizona state history due to his low approval ratings and a severe split in the GOP causing Democrat Woodrow Wilson to win the state despite receiving only 43.52% in total.

In 1912, more than 87% of Arizonans voted for one of three economically left-leaning candidates (Wilson, Roosevelt, Debs). Only 13% of the state sided with the conservative incumbent President Taft, who moved further to the right during his one term presidency. Arizona also voted in large numbers for two major third-party candidates; Theodore Roosevelt and Eugene Debs, both of whom won a combined 43% of the popular vote, nearly the same as Wilson's vote total. Roosevelt's 29.29% remains the best-ever third-party presidential performance in Arizona history.

Party division among Republican voters helped Wilson carry every single county in Arizona, winning all but three of them with less than a majority.

Arizona was one of only three states outside the former Confederate States of America in which the combined total of Roosevelt and Taft would not have defeated Wilson, the other two being Kentucky and Oklahoma (although the latter did not have Roosevelt on the ballot). This makes Arizona the sole non-southern or border state in which Wilson would have won over the combined Republican vote (though Arizonan territory was claimed by the Confederacy in the Civil War).

Beginning with this election, Arizona voted for every presidential election winner until 1960.

== Results ==
1912 United States presidential election in Arizona
Party	Candidate	Votes	%
Democratic	Woodrow Wilson	10,324	43.52%
Progressive	Theodore Roosevelt	6,949	29.29%
Socialist	Eugene V. Debs	3,163	13.33%
Republican	William Howard Taft (incumbent)	3,021	12.74%
Prohibition	Eugene Wilder Chafin	265	1.12%
Total votes		23,722	100%

General election results
Party	Pledged to	Elector	Votes
Democratic Party	Woodrow Wilson	Wiley E. Jones	10,324
Democratic Party	Woodrow Wilson	V. T. Webb	10,174
Democratic Party	Woodrow Wilson	John R. Hampton	10,130
Progressive Party	Theodore Roosevelt	E. S. Clark	6,949
Progressive Party	Theodore Roosevelt	John C. Greenway	6,879
Progressive Party	Theodore Roosevelt	Dwight B. Heard	6,873
Socialist Party of America	Eugene V. Debs	J. L. Brooks	3,163
Socialist Party of America	Eugene V. Debs	E. B. Simanton	3,139
Socialist Party of America	Eugene V. Debs	Paul E. White	3,132
Republican Party	William Howard Taft	Hoval A. Smith	3,021
Republican Party	William Howard Taft	Fred S. Breen	2,986
Republican Party	William Howard Taft	Walter Talbot	2,975
Prohibition Party	Eugene Wilder Chafin	Thomas F. Wilson	265
Prohibition Party	Eugene Wilder Chafin	J. Stanley Howard	221
Prohibition Party	Eugene Wilder Chafin	Roy E. Sibley	219
Total votes			23,722

=== Results by county ===
County	Woodrow Wilson Democratic		William Howard Taft (Note: There exist differences between the Géoelections and Dave Leip totals in this county for the Taft ticket only. This table’s figures are the Leip totals.) Republican		Theodore Roosevelt Progressive		Eugene V. Debs Socialist		Eugene Chafin Prohibition		Margin		Total votes cast
County	#	%	#	%	#	%	#	%	#	%	#	%	Total votes cast
Apache	108	42.35%	56	21.96%	79	30.98%	10	3.92%	2	0.78%	29	11.37%	255
Cochise	1,973	42.71%	403	8.72%	1,396	30.22%	819	17.73%	28	0.61%	577	12.49%	4,619
Coconino	339	39.65%	237	27.72%	178	20.82%	96	11.23%	5	0.58%	102	11.93%	855
Gila	779	38.09%	210	10.27%	542	26.50%	501	24.50%	13	0.64%	237	11.59%	2,045
Graham	540	51.09%	103	9.74%	243	22.99%	164	15.52%	7	0.66%	297	28.10%	1,057
Greenlee	652	55.54%	109	9.28%	287	24.45%	122	10.39%	4	0.34%	365	31.09%	1,174
Maricopa	2,606	45.97%	642	11.32%	1,818	32.07%	472	8.33%	131	2.31%	788	13.90%	5,669
Mohave	320	39.70%	69	8.56%	228	28.29%	184	22.83%	5	0.62%	92	11.41%	806
Navajo	287	39.05%	168	22.86%	233	31.70%	40	5.44%	7	0.95%	54	7.35%	735
Pima	693	38.41%	353	19.57%	615	34.09%	109	6.04%	34	1.88%	78	4.32%	1,804
Pinal	352	43.73%	80	9.94%	311	38.63%	61	7.58%	1	0.12%	41	5.10%	805
Santa Cruz	250	53.30%	56	11.94%	123	26.23%	38	8.10%	2	0.43%	127	27.07%	469
Yavapai	1,001	42.38%	445	18.84%	537	22.73%	358	15.16%	21	0.89%	464	19.65%	2,362
Yuma	424	39.74%	90	8.43%	359	33.65%	189	17.71%	5	0.47%	65	6.09%	1,067
Totals	10,324	43.52%	3,021	12.74%	6,949	29.29%	3,163	13.33%	265	1.12%	3,375	14.23%	23,722

== See also ==
- United States presidential elections in Arizona
