= Sheldon, Arizona =

- Populated place
- Location within the state of Arizona Sheldon (the United States)
- Coordinates: 32°48′53″N 109°10′20″W
- Country: United States
- State: Arizona
- County: Greenlee
- Elevation: 3,586 ft (1,093 m)
- Time zone: UTC-7 (Mountain (MST))
  - Summer (DST): UTC-7 (MST)
- Area code: 928
- FIPS code: 04-65910
- GNIS feature ID: 24612

Sheldon is a populated place situated in Greenlee County, Arizona, United States, near the border with New Mexico. It is named after Lionel Sheldon, who served as governor of the New Mexico Territory from 1881 to 1885. A post office was opened at this location in 1908, and remained in operation until its closure in 1919.
