= Round Valley Unified School District =

School district in Arizona, United States

The Round Valley Unified School District (RVUSD) is an Arizona school district comprising five schools in Apache County, Arizona. The towns that house the schools of RVUSD include Eagar and Springerville, Arizona. As of 2006, RVUSD has 1610 students. The mascot for the entire school system is the Elks.

== History ==
Schools in Springerville and Eagar were founded in 1880 and 1896, respectively. In 1969, the Springerville, Eagar, Vernon, Nutrioso, Greer, and Colter schools consolidated with each other to form the Round Valley Unified School District.

Previously Blue School District of Blue was a K-8 school, so Round Valley High School in Eagar served Blue for high school, with some students living with relatives in Eagar and some traveling to and from Eagar via school bus.

== Schools ==
- Round Valley Elementary School
- Round Valley Ensphere
- Round Valley Middle School
- Round Valley High School
