= Round Valley Ensphere =

Sports venue in Apache County, Arizona

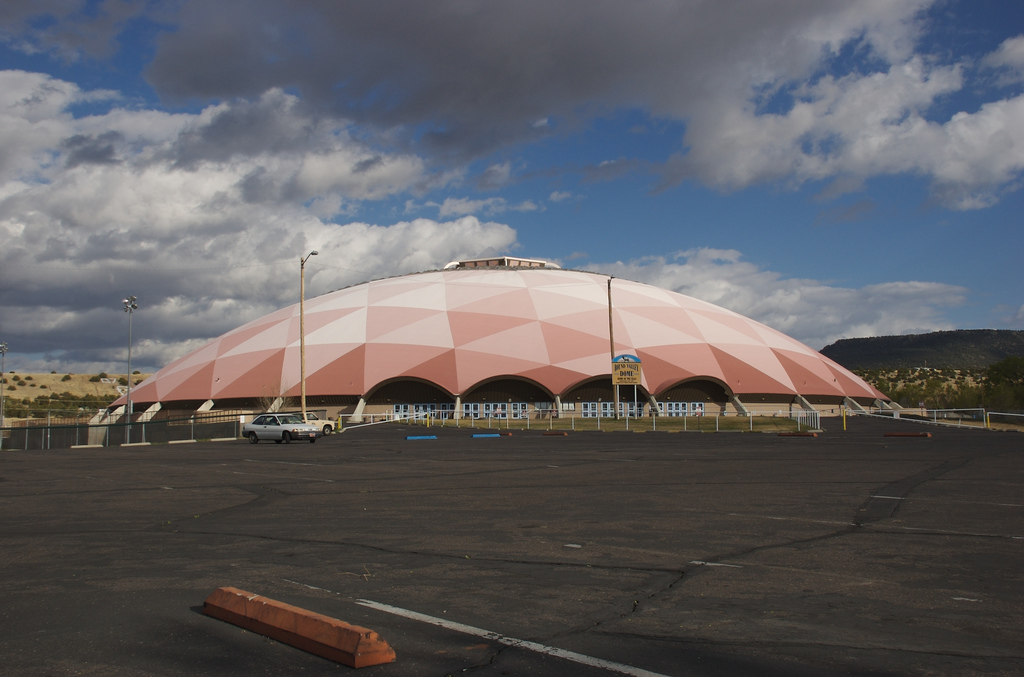
- Front of the dome with main entrance
- Interactive map of Round Valley Ensphere
- Location: Eagar, Arizona, USA
- Coordinates: 34.120427°N 109.284959°W
- Owner: Round Valley High School/Round Valley Unified School District
- Capacity: Volleyball, basketball: 9,000; American football: 5,500
- Field size: Diameter – 440 ft (130 m); Volume – 189,000 ft^{2} (17,600 m^{2})

Construction
- Groundbreaking: 1990
- Opened: October 11, 1991
- Cost: US$11,000,000 ($26 million in 2025 dollars)
- Architect: Rossman Schneider Gadbery Shay
- General contractor: Sletten Construction Company

The Round Valley Ensphere (also known as the Tot Workman Dome) is a wooden-dome stadium in Eagar, Arizona, USA. It is owned by Round Valley High School and the Round Valley Unified School District. It is the only domed high school football stadium in the United States. Opened in 1991–92 at a cost of US$11 million, the venue seats 5,500 people for football and 9,000 for basketball and volleyball. The dome encloses a floor area of 189,000 square feet (17,600 m^{2}).

== History ==
In 1987, a $12 million bond for the dome and repairs was floated and passed after it was found that Tucson Electric Power, which operates a generating station in the area, would have to pay for $11 million of it. (Since the utility generates 90% of the property values in the area, it pays 90% of the property taxes.) TEP, at the time facing financial issues, sued to block construction, but trial and appellate courts rejected the lawsuit.

Construction began in the summer of 1990. It was forced to stop for three months for reinspection when two workers were hit by wooden beams and fell 75 feet to their deaths.

The dome held its first football game on October 11, 1991, featuring the Payson High School Longhorns.

The venue was closed in 2015 due to water damage and remained closed for nearly a year. The water damage was caused when heavy rains brought water into the building through the exterior doors. The damage to the synthetic turf in the facility produced elevated levels of mercury vapor, which required the facility to undergo professional remediation. After playing outside for the 2015 season, the Round Valley team returned to the dome for football games in 2016.

In September of 2024, the school renamed the facility in honor of their former head coach, Tot Workman.

== Structure ==
The Ensphere encloses 8,000,000 cubic feet (230,000 m^{3}) of space and was the first fully day-lighted dome of its kind, allowing light and heat to enter.

== Uses ==
=== School ===
In addition to football, the facility is used for basketball, track and field, and soccer.

=== Non-school ===
The dome is also used for nonschool events, such as a car show. In 2002, as a result of the Rodeo-Chediski fire, the second-largest in Arizona history, the dome was used as a shelter. It took in 9,800 evacuees, tripling Eagar's population overnight, visited the shelter. The absorption of so many people almost caused the town's sewage system to be overloaded.

In 2016, the Cedar Fire prompted evacuations in Pinetop, for which the Round Valley Dome was made available as an evacuation site.

== See also ==
- Walkup Skydome – another wooden dome in Arizona, built in 1977 for athletics and other uses
- Tacoma Dome, 1983 ensphere-design arena built for a much larger capacity
