= Benjamin F. Billingsley House =

Historic house in Arizona, United States

- U.S. National Register of Historic Places
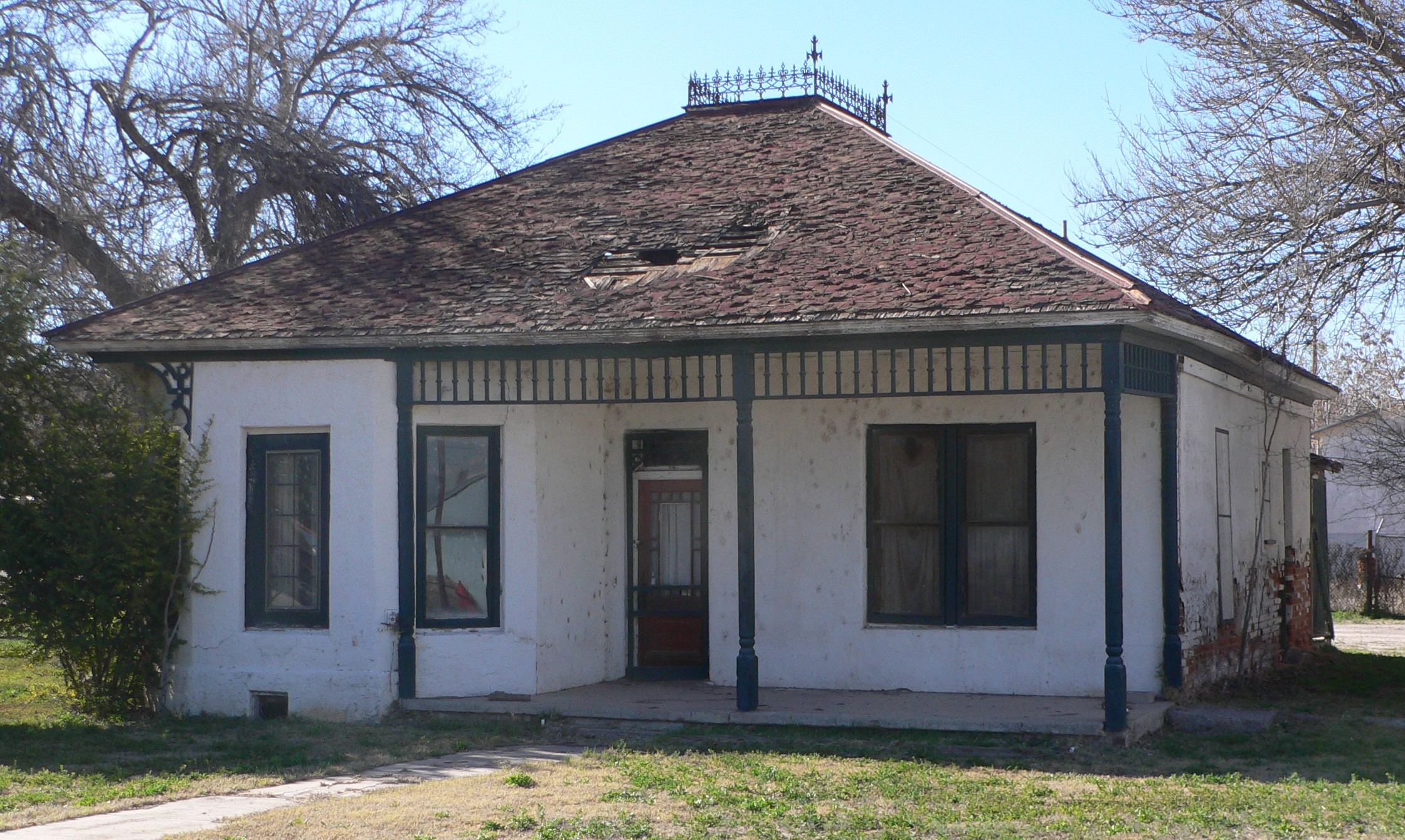

- Location within Arizona
- Location: 202 Main St., Duncan, Arizona
- Coordinates: 32°43′16″N 109°06′22″W
- Area: less than one acre
- Built: 1900
- Architectural style: Queen Anne
- NRHP reference No.: 83002998
- Added to NRHP: August 25, 1983

The Benjamin F. Billingsley House, at 202 Main St. in Duncan, Arizona, was built around 1900. It has modest elements of Queen Anne style. It was listed on the National Register of Historic Places in 1983.

It is 30 by 35 feet (9.1 m × 10.7 m) in plan and has a hipped roof with a projecting corbelled brick chimney and ornamental cast iron "cresting" which was added after 1907. It was built of brick which was hidden by stuccoing around 1940.

The house was flooded in 1940 and in 1978 but was not much damaged.

It was deemed significant for its association with Benjamin F. Billingsley, who sold agricultural supplies and other dry goods merchandise in Duncan from 1895 to 1940. It is believed to be the oldest house in Duncan and it is suggested to be "architecturally significant as an example of domestic residential architecture built during Arizona's Territorial period in the late nineteenth century."
