= Round Valley High School =

- Home of the Elks

Location
- 550 N. Butler St; Eagar, Arizona 85938; United States; 34°07′13″N 109°17′17″W

Information
- Type: Public High school
- CEEB code: 030090
- Teaching staff: 20.00 (FTE)
- Grades: 9–12
- Enrollment: 416 (2023–2024)
- Student to teacher ratio: 20.80
- Colors: Black and gold
- Nickname: Elks
- Website: www.elks.net/o/rvhs

Round Valley High School is a high school serving 445 students in Eagar, Arizona, United States. It is the only high school in the Round Valley Unified School District.

When Blue School District in Blue was a K-8 school, Round Valley served Blue for high school, with some students living with relatives in Eagar and some traveling to and from Eagar via school bus.

== History ==
For several years until 1961, when enrollment was 180, the number of students kept increasing. In 1962 that figure was down to 170 (which was up from 168 two weeks prior to the start of that school year).

On June 11, 2010, a small plane crashed into the high school administration building, killing a family of four on board. It might have been trying to land on the practice football field in high winds.

== Dome ==
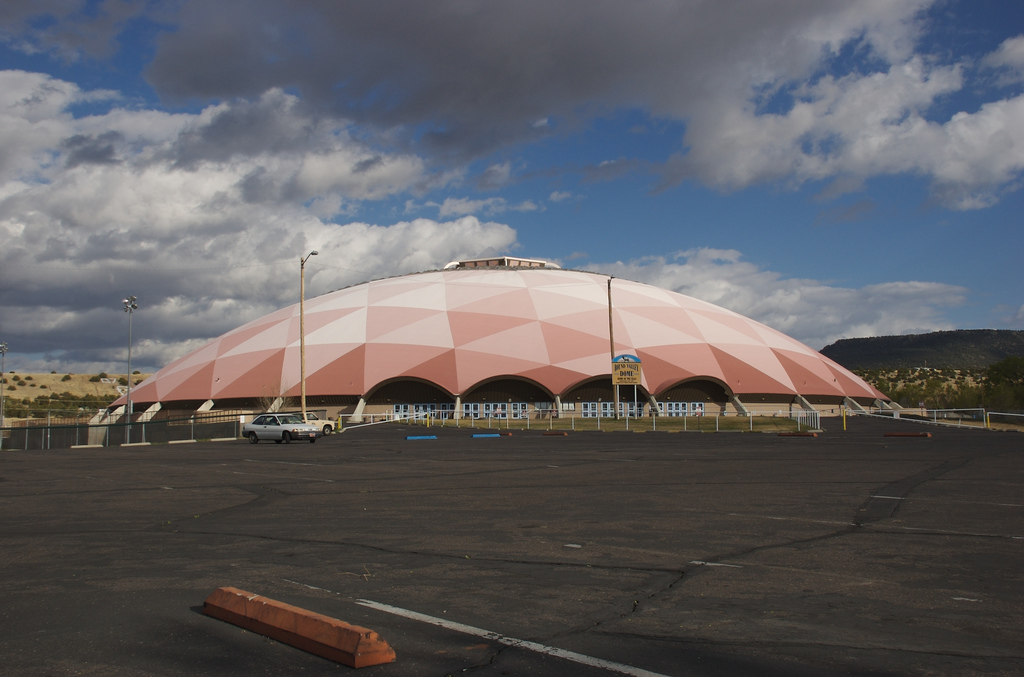
The Round Valley Ensphere

The school owns the Round Valley Ensphere, a multi-use domed stadium that hosts football, basketball, and other sports events, plus non-school functions such as car shows.

== Notable alumni ==
- Mark Gastineau, former defensive end for the New York Jets (1979–88)
