= Eagar, Arizona =

Town in Apache County, Arizona

- Town
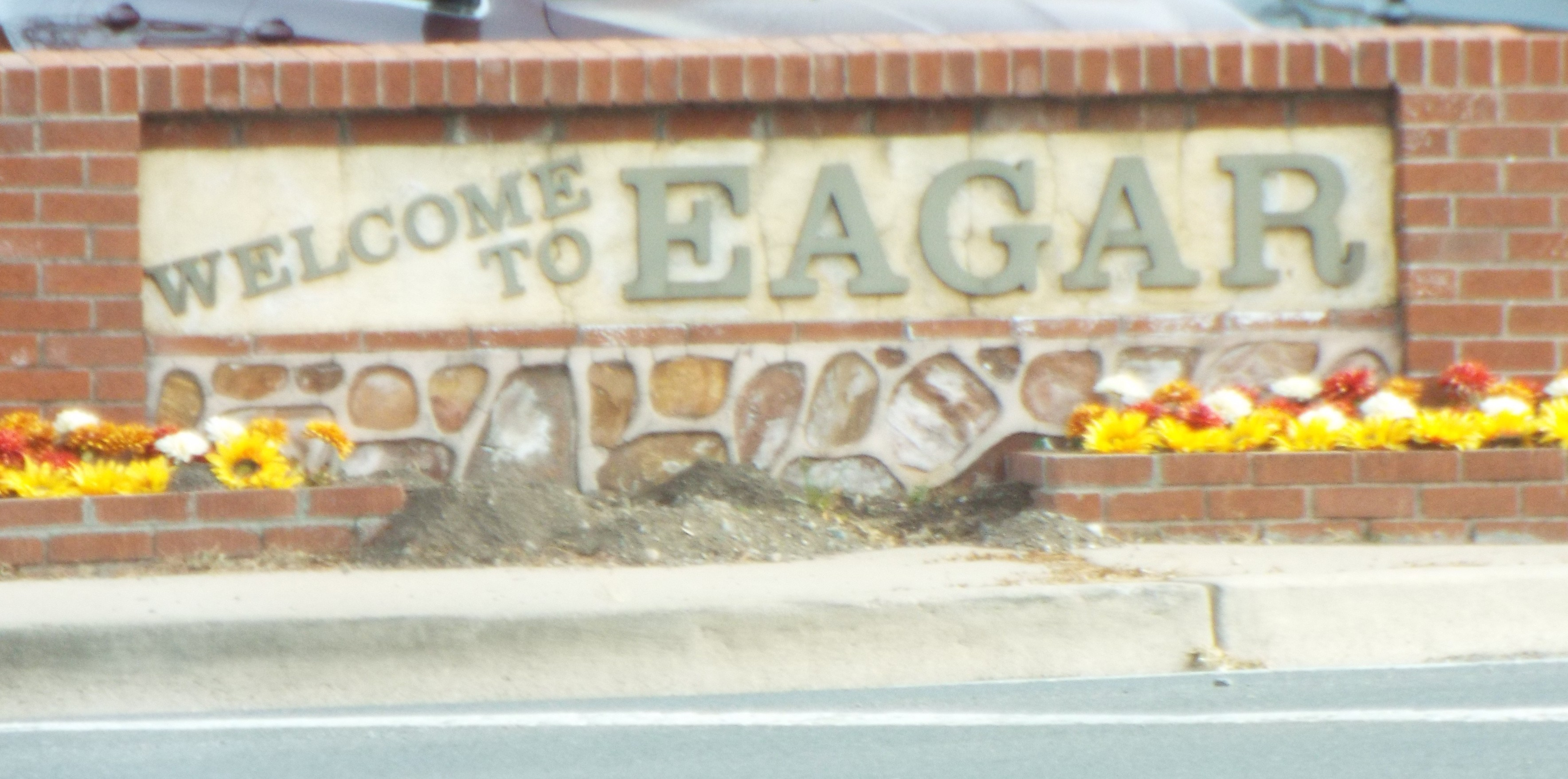
- Welcome to Eagar, Arizona
- Motto: Where roads hit the trail
- Location of Eagar in Apache County, Arizona

- Location in the United States
- Coordinates: 34°06′24″N 109°17′28″W
- Country: United States
- State: Arizona
- County: Apache

Government
  - Mayor: Guy Phelps

Area
  - Total: 11.59 sq mi (30.02 km^{2})
  - Land: 11.58 sq mi (30.00 km^{2})
  - Water: 0.0077 sq mi (0.02 km^{2})
- Elevation: 7,238 ft (2,206 m)

Population (2020)
  - Total: 4,395
  - Density: 379.4/sq mi (146.49/km^{2})
- Time zone: UTC-7 (MST)
- ZIP code: 85925
- Area code: 928
- FIPS code: 04-20960
- GNIS feature ID: 2412455
- Website: Town of Eagar

Eagar (Navajo: Shádiʼááhjí Tsé Noodǫ́ǫ́z) is the largest town by population in Apache County, Arizona, United States. As of the 2020 census, Eagar had a population of 4,395.

The area was the home of the Apache people. The town of Eagar was first settled by European Americans in 1871.

== History ==
Brothers William Walter, John Thomas, and Joel Sixtus settled the area under the direction of The Mormon prophet Brigham Young. They each acquired 160 acres of land under the homestead act. Once they received the deeds to their properties, again under the direction of Brigham Young, they each subdivided their properties to sell at a discounted rate to other church members who were also settling the area.

The first postmistress, Emma Goldsbrough Udall, wanted to name the town "Union", in a desire for eventually combining the town with other towns such as Amity and Springerville, to unite the small community. However, the US postmaster general rejected the name as too common. Therefore, she submitted the name "Eagarville" to honor the Eagar brothers. However, that name was also changed by the postmaster general to just "Eagar" sometime before December 1892 when the school district was renamed.

A battle took place near what is now the town cemetery, in which 9 members of the Snyder gang were killed.

The town of Eagar was incorporated in 1948.

== Geography ==
Eagar is located in southern Apache County, just north of Apache National Forest and at the foot of the White Mountains.

According to the United States Census Bureau, the town has a total area of 11.2 square miles (29.1 km^{2}), of which 0.008 square miles (0.02 km^{2}), or 0.07%, is water. The town of Springerville borders Eagar to the north.

=== Climate ===
This region experiences warm (but not hot) and dry summers, with no average monthly temperatures above 71.6 °F. According to the Köppen Climate Classification system, Eagar has a cold semi-arid climate, abbreviated "BSk" on climate maps.

Climate data for Eagar, 1991–2020 simulated normals (7069 ft elevation)
Month	Jan	Feb	Mar	Apr	May	Jun	Jul	Aug	Sep	Oct	Nov	Dec	Year
Mean daily maximum °F (°C)	48.4 (9.1)	51.3 (10.7)	57.4 (14.1)	64.4 (18.0)	72.9 (22.7)	83.1 (28.4)	83.7 (28.7)	81.0 (27.2)	77.0 (25.0)	68.5 (20.3)	57.6 (14.2)	48.6 (9.2)	66.2 (19.0)
Daily mean °F (°C)	32.5 (0.3)	35.6 (2.0)	40.6 (4.8)	46.9 (8.3)	54.9 (12.7)	64.2 (17.9)	68.0 (20.0)	66.0 (18.9)	60.6 (15.9)	50.7 (10.4)	40.5 (4.7)	32.7 (0.4)	49.4 (9.7)
Mean daily minimum °F (°C)	16.7 (−8.5)	19.9 (−6.7)	24.1 (−4.4)	29.7 (−1.3)	36.9 (2.7)	45.3 (7.4)	52.3 (11.3)	51.1 (10.6)	44.1 (6.7)	32.9 (0.5)	23.5 (−4.7)	16.7 (−8.5)	32.8 (0.4)
Average precipitation inches (mm)	0.58 (14.84)	0.58 (14.66)	0.48 (12.12)	0.32 (8.18)	0.45 (11.36)	0.36 (9.10)	2.76 (70.20)	3.22 (81.67)	1.57 (39.87)	0.96 (24.38)	0.52 (13.16)	0.63 (16.06)	12.43 (315.6)
Average dew point °F (°C)	15.3 (−9.3)	16.2 (−8.8)	17.4 (−8.1)	17.6 (−8.0)	21.9 (−5.6)	26.8 (−2.9)	44.6 (7.0)	48.4 (9.1)	40.6 (4.8)	27.5 (−2.5)	19.0 (−7.2)	14.7 (−9.6)	25.8 (−3.4)
Source: Prism Climate Group

== Demographics ==
Historical population
Census	Pop.	Note	%±
1910	397		—
1920	635		59.9%
1930	562		−11.5%
1950	637		—
1960	873		37.0%
1970	1,279		46.5%
1980	2,791		118.2%
1990	4,025		44.2%
2000	4,033		0.2%
2010	4,885		21.1%
2020	4,395		−10.0%
U.S. Decennial Census

=== Racial and ethnic composition ===
Eagar town, Arizona – Racial composition Note: the US Census treats Hispanic/Latino as an ethnic category. This table excludes Latinos from the racial categories and assigns them to a separate category. Hispanics/Latinos may be of any race.
Race (NH = Non-Hispanic)	2020	2010	2000	1990	1980
White alone (NH)	73.3% (3,223)	75.5% (3,690)	79.8% (3,220)	82.7% (3,327)	88.6% (2,472)
Black alone (NH)	0.3% (11)	0.5% (22)	0.4% (17)	0% (2)	0% (0)
American Indian alone (NH)	3.4% (148)	3% (146)	3.1% (125)	4% (161)	2.3% (63)
Asian alone (NH)	0.5% (20)	0.2% (10)	0.1% (5)	0.2% (8)	0.4% (11)
Pacific Islander alone (NH)	0% (0)	0% (1)	0.2% (9)		
Other race alone (NH)	0.3% (15)	0.1% (4)	0% (2)	0.1% (3)	0% (0)
Multiracial (NH)	2.3% (99)	2% (96)	2.3% (91)	—	—
Hispanic/Latino (any race)	20% (879)	18.8% (916)	14% (564)	13% (524)	8.8% (245)

=== 2020 census ===
As of the 2020 census, the population of Eagar was 4,395. The median age was 38.5 years. 29.7% of residents were under the age of 18 and 19.1% were 65 years of age or older. For every 100 females, there were 99.6 males, and for every 100 females age 18 and over there were 95.0 males age 18 and over.

0.0% of residents lived in urban areas, while 100.0% lived in rural areas.

There were 1,588 households, of which 34.6% had children under the age of 18 living in them. Of all households, 55.0% were married-couple households, 17.4% were households with a male householder and no spouse or partner present, and 22.6% were households with a female householder and no spouse or partner present. About 22.6% of all households were made up of individuals, and 11.9% had someone living alone who was 65 years of age or older.

There were 1,910 housing units, of which 16.9% were vacant. The homeowner vacancy rate was 1.9% and the rental vacancy rate was 6.2%.

=== 2000 census ===
As of the census of 2000, there were 4,033 people, 1,344 households, and 1,073 families residing in the town. The population density was 355.6 inhabitants per square mile (137.3/km^{2}). There were 1,713 housing units at an average density of 151.1 per square mile (58.3/km^{2}). The racial makeup of the town was 87.1% White, 3.4% Native American, 0.4% Black or African American, 0.1% Asian, 0.4% Pacific Islander, 4.9% from other races, and 3.8% from two or more races. 14.0% of the population were Hispanic or Latino of any race.

There were 1,344 households, out of which 45.7% had children under the age of 18 living with them, 65.5% were married couples living together, 11.4% had a female householder with no husband present, and 20.1% were non-families. 17.3% of all households were made up of individuals, and 7.3% had someone living alone who was 65 years of age or older. The average household size was 2.99 and the average family size was 3.38.

In the town, the age distribution of the population shows 36.2% under the age of 18, 7.6% from 18 to 24, 23.5% from 25 to 44, 23.5% from 45 to 64, and 9.2% who were 65 years of age or older. The median age was 33 years. For every 100 females, there were 95.7 males. For every 100 females age 18 and over, there were 91.8 males.

The median income for a household in the town was $37,378, and the median income for a family was $41,250. Males had a median income of $36,111 versus $21,274 for females. The per capita income for the town was $14,623. About 7.8% of families and 7.4% of the population were below the poverty line, including 5.8% of those under age 18 and 10.0% of those age 65 or over.

== Arts and culture ==
The Apache County Library District operates the Round Valley Public Library in Eagar.

Two sites are listed on the National Register of Historic Places, including, Colter Ranch, once one of the largest cattle operations in Northeastern Arizona, and Eagar Elementary School, built after the original frame school house burned in 1930. The building served as a school for 53 years.

== Government ==
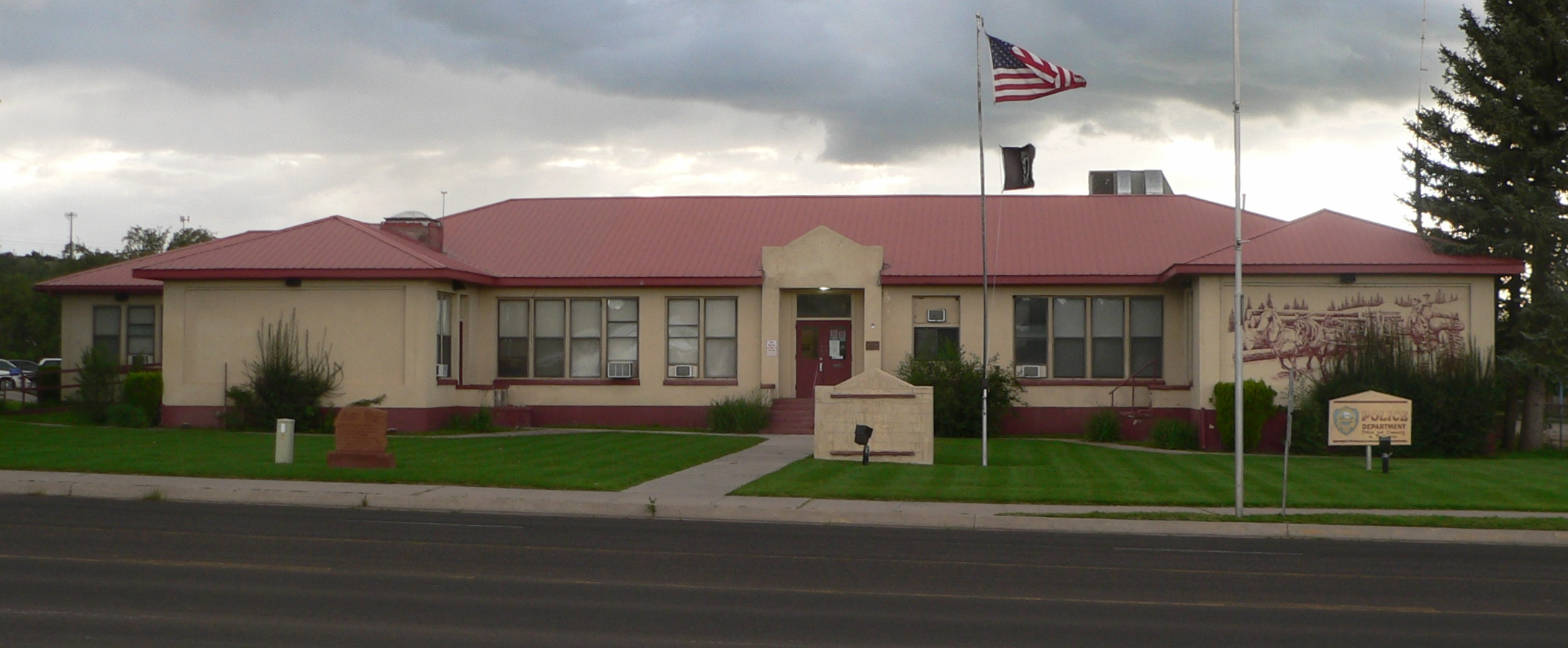
Eagar Town Hall

The current town mayor is Guy Phelps. The town is home to the first enclosed high school football field, the Round Valley Ensphere.

== Education ==
The town is served by Round Valley Unified School District.

The town is served by three neighborhood schools: Round Valley Elementary School, Round Valley Middle School, and Round Valley High School.

In addition, White Mountain Academy, a K–12 charter school, is located in Eagar.

== Notable people ==
- Joseph Isaac (Ike) Clanton (1847–1887), member of the Cowboys
- Milton William Cooper, conspiracy theorist (UFOs and Illuminati)
- Mark Gastineau, former professional football player attended Round Valley High School.
- Don Taylor Udall, state legislator and judge
- Jesse Addison Udall, state legislator and chief justice of the Arizona Supreme Court

== See also ==
- List of cities and towns in Arizona
- Transfer Station Fire
