= Solomonville Road Overpass =

Solomonville Road Overpass may refer to:

- Solomonville Road Overpass (Clifton, Arizona), listed on the National Register of Historic Places in Greenlee County, Arizona
- Solomonville Road Overpass (Safford, Arizona), listed on the National Register of Historic Places in Greenlee County, Arizona
