= List of historic properties in Duncan, Arizona =

- Town
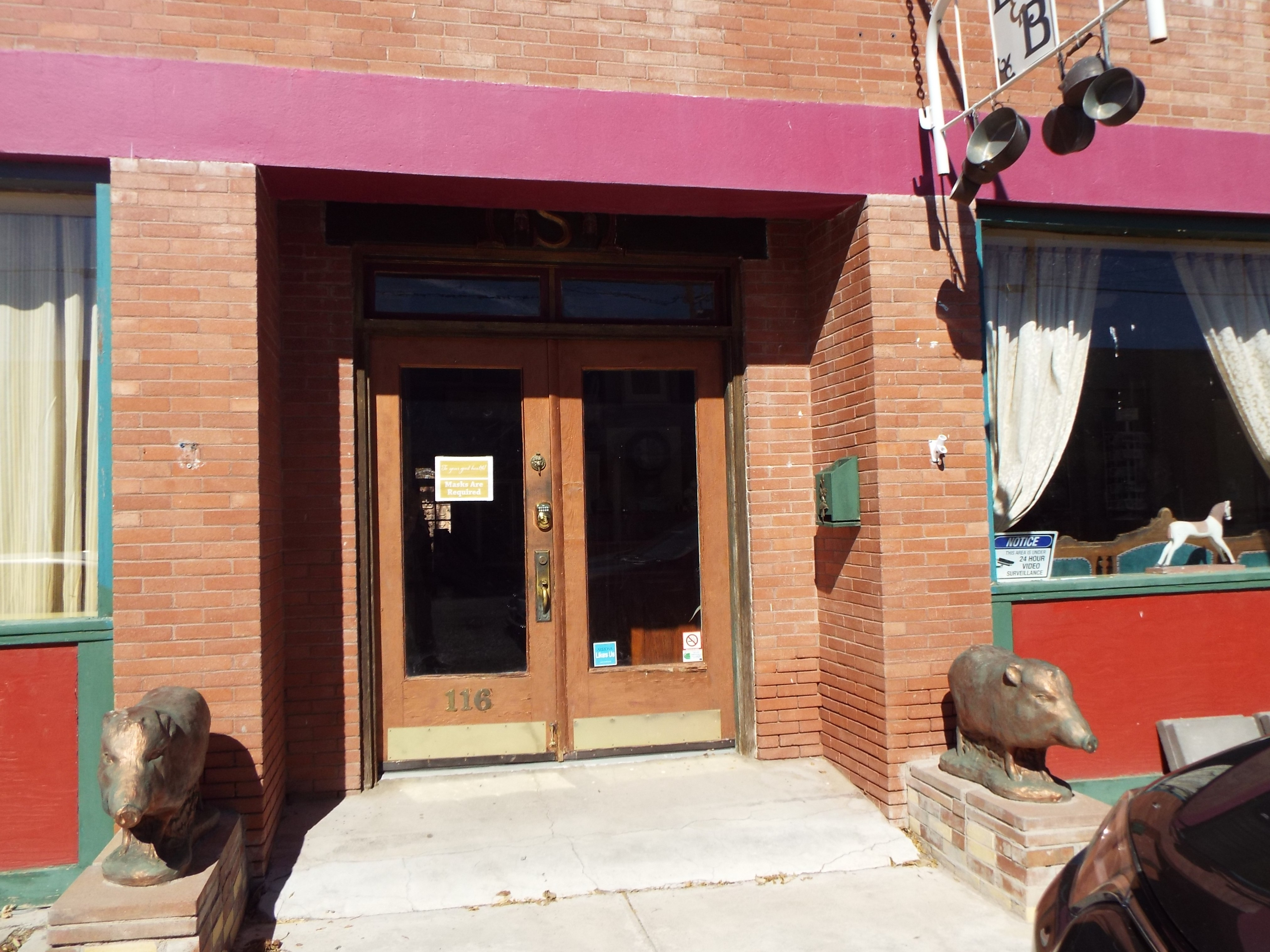
- Simpson Hotel entrance- 1914

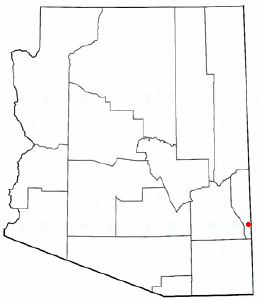
- Location of Duncan in Greenlee County, Arizona
- Coordinates: 32°43′33″N 109°5′52″W

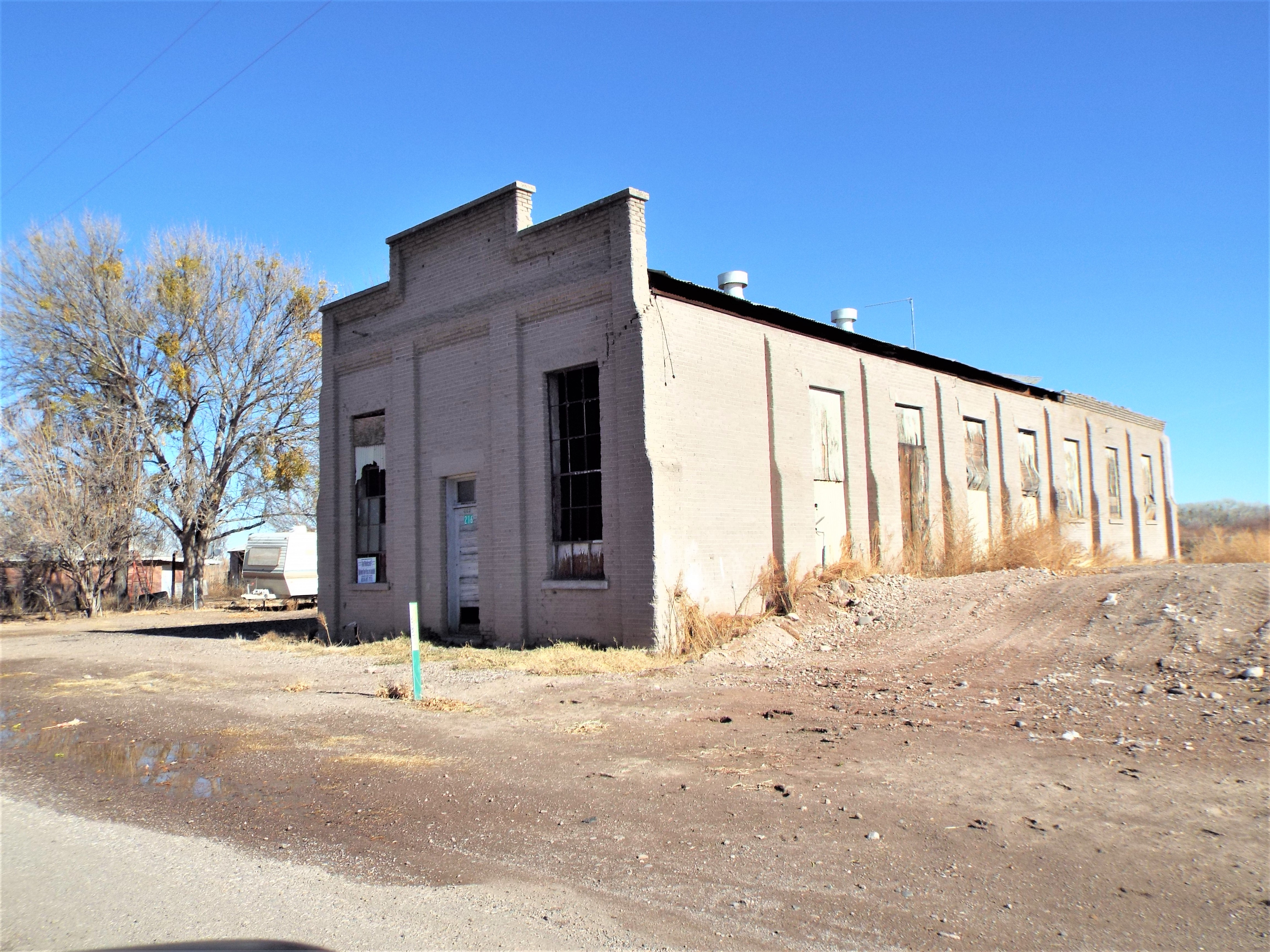
Side view of the Knights of Pythias lodge#27 building - 1900

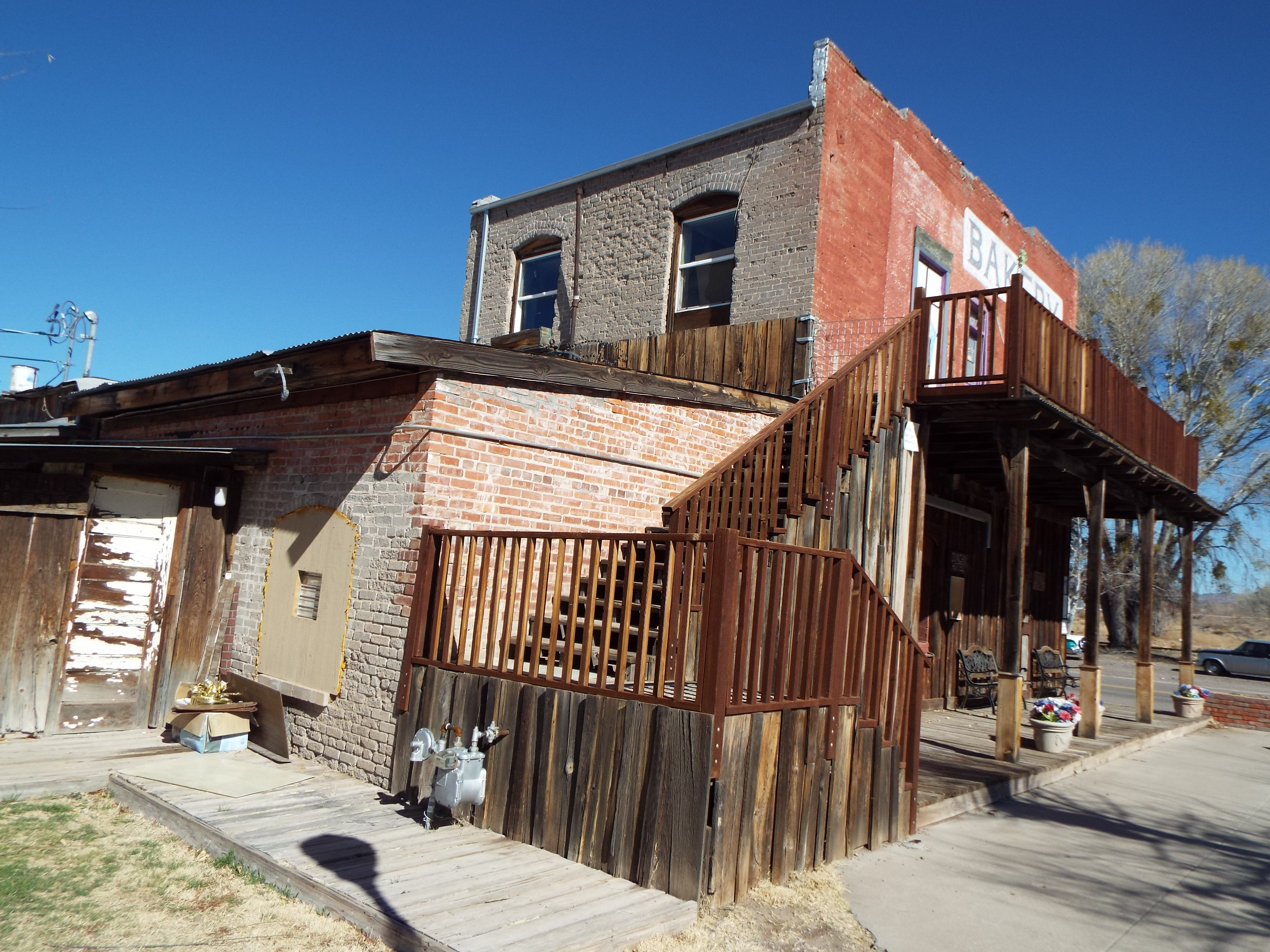
Freiheit Building - 1913

This is a list, which includes a photographic gallery, of some of the remaining historic buildings, houses, and other structures in the mining town of Duncan, which is located in Greenlee County, Arizona. The Duncan Pride Society has identified various structures as significantly historical. The society has taken it upon themselves the task of restoring many of them. Also included are photographs of the antique town clock and the 1950 Chevrolet 6400 2-ton fire truck once used in Duncan. Among the historic properties is the Benjamin F. Billingsley House, which is listed in the National Register of Historic Places.

== Brief history ==
According archeologists the specimens of pottery and stone implements found in the area of Greenlee County, where the town of Duncan is located indicate that the members of the Anasazi were among the first people to inhabit the region. This was hundreds of years before the first white men, the Spanish explorers arrival. The Anasazi are considered by historians to have been an advanced ancient native-American civilization. Eventually the Apaches, who were hunters, gatherers, and raiders, would become the dominant native-American force.

=== New Spain ===
Francisco Vasquez de Coronado was a governor of a province in New Spain (in Mexico). He heard reports of the legend of the Seven Golden Cities and believed they were located north of Mexico's western coast. Vasquez de Coronado organized an expedition which eventually passed through the area where the San Francisco River is located. He failed in his mission. Fray Marcos de Niza, who was a notable Spanish missionary, also passed through the area with the intention of converting the natives to Catholicism.

=== New Mexico ===
The territory that includes present-day New Mexico and Arizona was designated as "New Mexico”. Mexico became independent from Spain in 1821. A team of mountain men and trappers that were led by James Ohio Pattie in 1824 and 1825 arrived, and they searched the San Francisco River edges for beavers in the area. Hats made from the fur of beavers were very popular in the 1800s.

In 1845, Mexico severed its relations with the United States because of the annexation of Texas by the United States. United States President James K. Polk declared war against Mexico in what became known as the Mexican–American War. The Mormon Battalion was among the troops which entered the area. Arizona north of the Gila River was taken by the United States under the terms of the Treaty of Guadalupe Hidalgo at the end of the war.

=== Arizona Territory ===
The California volunteers pursuing the Apaches in 185, discovered the first minerals in the Greenlee area. Conflicts between the Apaches and the advancing Anglo settlers resulted in a war known as the Apache Wars. The conflict with the Apaches lasted 26 years. Mining for gold and silver began in 1864, followed by copper in 1872.

Duncan had its origin on the north bank of the San Francisco River where two men, whose surname was Purdy, established a way station on the ore haulage line that ran between Clifton and Silver City, New Mexico. In 1883, a post office was established in Purdy. Thus the new settlement was named Purdy. Scottish investors financed the building of a narrow gauge railway from Clifton to Lordsburg, New Mexico. The railway line was called the Arizona and New Mexico Railroad, and it passed through Purdy. James Duncan Smith became the managing director of the Arizona Copper Company, and, after Purdy was moved to the south bank of the river, it was renamed Duncan. The Purdy post office was relocated to the new location of Purdy and thus the settlement was renamed Duncan. Duncan was officially founded in 1883 and became a shipping point for markets in the middle west and east. Zinc and copper mines were established in the hills around Duncan. The railroad stop in Duncan made the town a marketing center for farm produce and a shipping point for ore and cattle. Greenlee County was created in 1909 and named for Mason Greenlee, who was an early settler in the Clifton area.

== Duncan Pride Society ==
The Duncan Pride Society was established on March 8, 2001. The society's vision statement is the following: "PRIDE is committed to work with our town government, community leaders and all area residents to preserve and enhance our town's overall image and historic value". The society's first project was Spezia Square, placed on a historical corner located on the Old West Highway. Among the society's accomplishments is the clean-ups and painting of scenes on most of the old buildings.

Jim McPherson, Arizona Preservation Foundation board president, has stated the following:

It is crucial that residents, private interests, and government officials act now to save these elements of our cultural heritage before it is too late.

An individual structure listed in the National Register of Historic Places (NRHP) is the Benjamin F. Billingsley House listed on August 25, 1983, reference: #83002998. The following is in accordance to the NRHP: Applicable Criteria: Architecture/Engineering Person; Architectural Styles: Queen Anne; Areas Of Significance: Commerce, Architecture; Periods Of Significance: 1900–1924 Sandra Day O’Connor, the first female justice of the United States Supreme Court, grew up on the Lazy B, a cattle ranch near Duncan.

== Historic properties ==
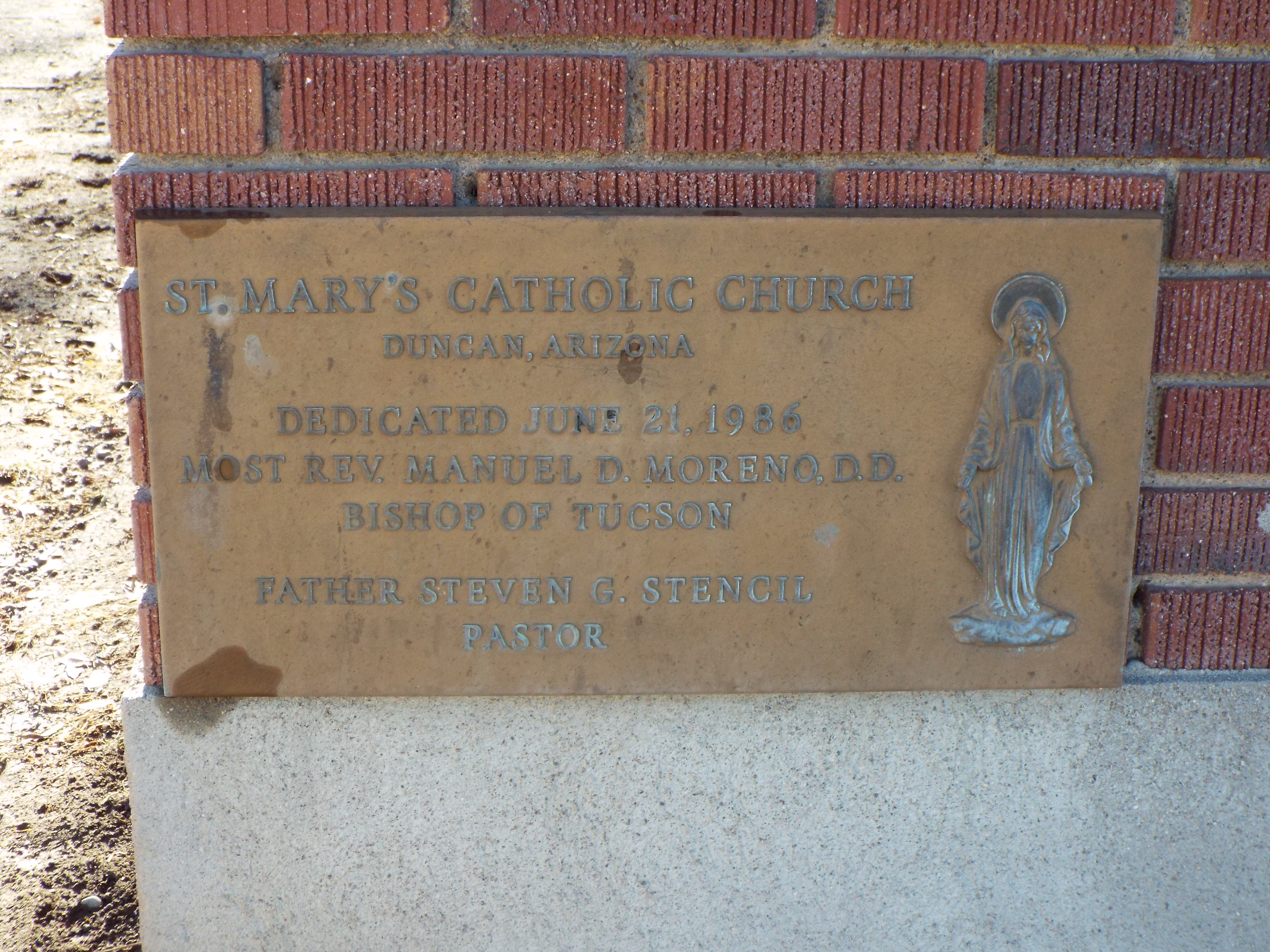
Saint Mary's Catholic Church corner block - 1936

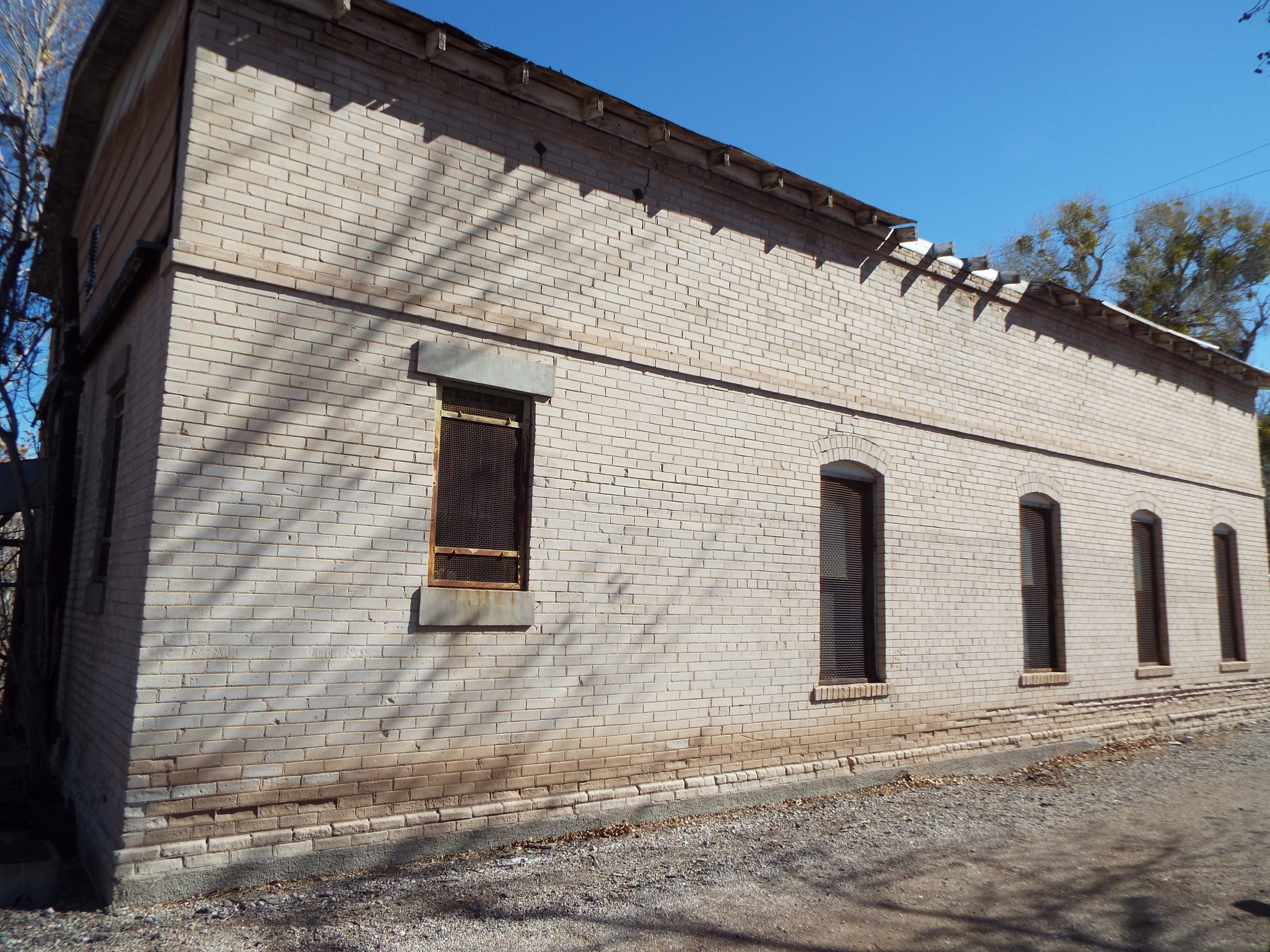
Greenlee County Building -1890

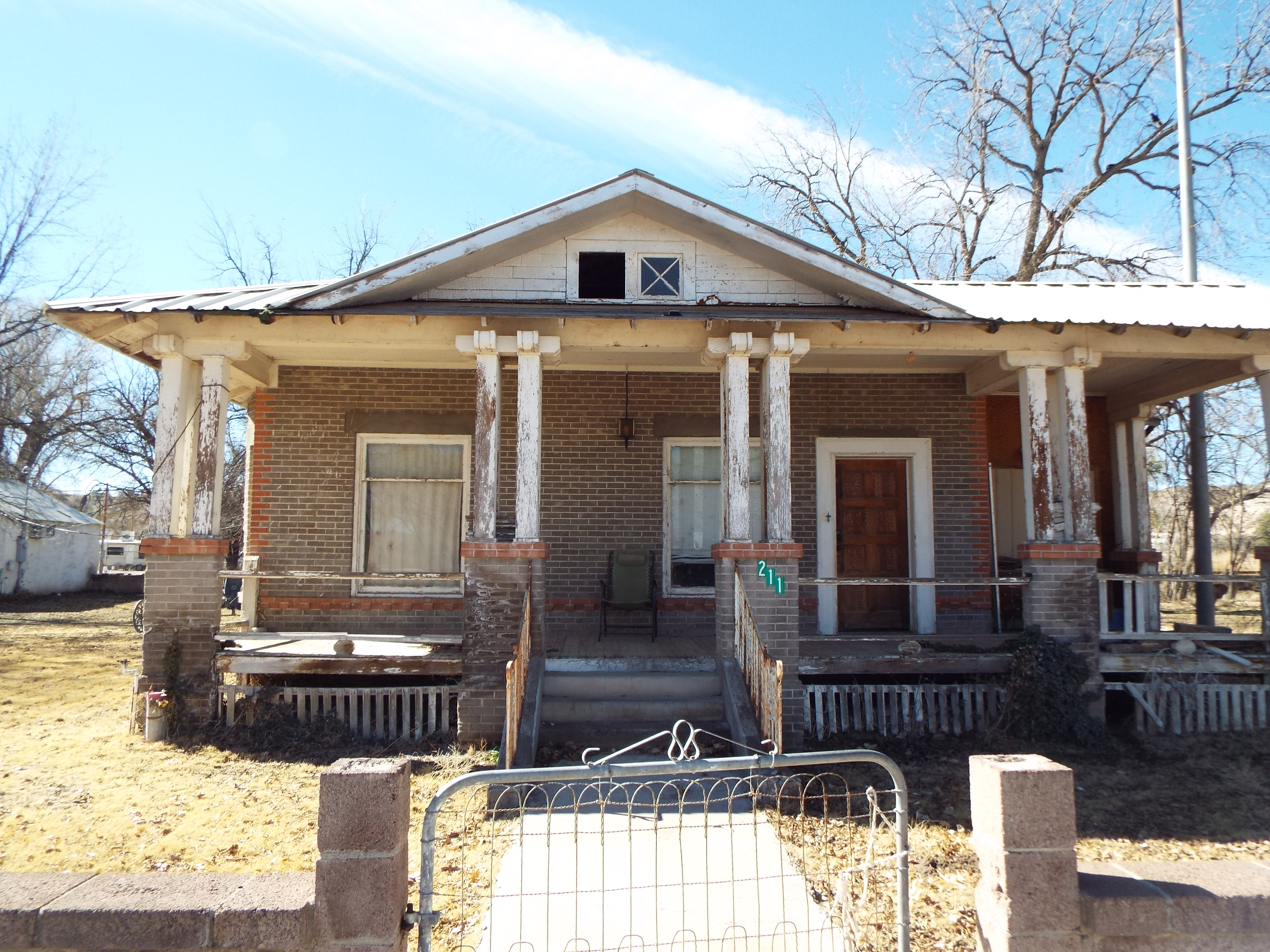
House on 211 Railroad Ave. - 1920

The following historic structures are listed as contributing factors within Duncan. The names posted are the original names used when the properties were first built. Also pictured is the antique town clock located in Spezia Square Park and the 1950 Chevrolet 6400 2-ton fire truck once used in Duncan.

- Benjamin F. Billingsley House – built in 1900 and located in 202 Main St. The Billingsley House is a one-story, slightly asymmetrical Queen Anne house with a steeply pitched, truncated hip roof. There is a corbelled brick chimney projecting from the south roof slope. Benjamin F. Billingsley, was a prosperous dry goods merchant in Duncan from 1895 to 1940. NRHP August 25, 1983, Ref: #83002998.
- Simpson Hotel (former Hotel Hobbs) – built in 1914 and located in 116 Main Street
- Freiheit Building – built in 1913 and located in Spezia Square Park on Railroad Ave. (Old US 70)
- Country Store – built in 1909 and located in 105 Railroad Ave. (Old US 70)
- Duncan Restaurant – built in 1909 and located in 107 Railroad Ave. (Old US 70)
- Duncan Theater – built in 1921 and located in Railroad Ave. (Old US 70)
- River Front Lounge (former Bonnie Heather Bar/Pool Hall) – built in 1925 and located in Railroad Ave. (Old US 70)
- Bonnie Heather Inn – built in 1920 and located in 105 Main Street
- First Duncan School Building – built in 1908 and located in 100 High St. Originally the school had a second floor. Now the American Legion, minus the second floor, which was removed, is housed in the building.
- Duncan Bus Station – now the Duncan Hotel was built in 1920 and located in 302 Old US 70
- Lonesome Dove Mercantile – built in 1860 and located in 404 North Ave.
- Saint Mary's Catholic Church – built in 1936 and located in 111 3rd Street
- Bank of Duncan – built in 1908 and located in 118 Main Street
- Duncan Opera House – built in 1920 and located in 218 Hill Street
- S & L Enterprises – built in 1896 and located in 108 Main Street
- Bart Tipton's Saloon (former Ford Motors, Peterson's Garage) – built in 1905 and located on the corner of Main and Railroad Ave
- Greenlee County Building – built in 1890 and located in 115 Madison Street
- House on 211 Railroad Ave. – built in 1920
- Germaine store – built in 1900 and located in 417 North Ave.
- Knights of Pythias building – built in 1900 and located in 449 (216) Main Street. This building housed the Duncan Lodge num. 27 of the Knights of Pythias
- Duncan Church of Christ – built in 1914 and located in 328 East Ave,
- Duncan Stage Stop – built in 1890 and located in Madison Street
- Antique town clock – located in Spezia Square Park on Railroad Ave. (Old US 70)
- 1950 Chevrolet 6400 2-ton fire truck – located on the corner of Main and Railroad Ave.
Duncan, Arizona

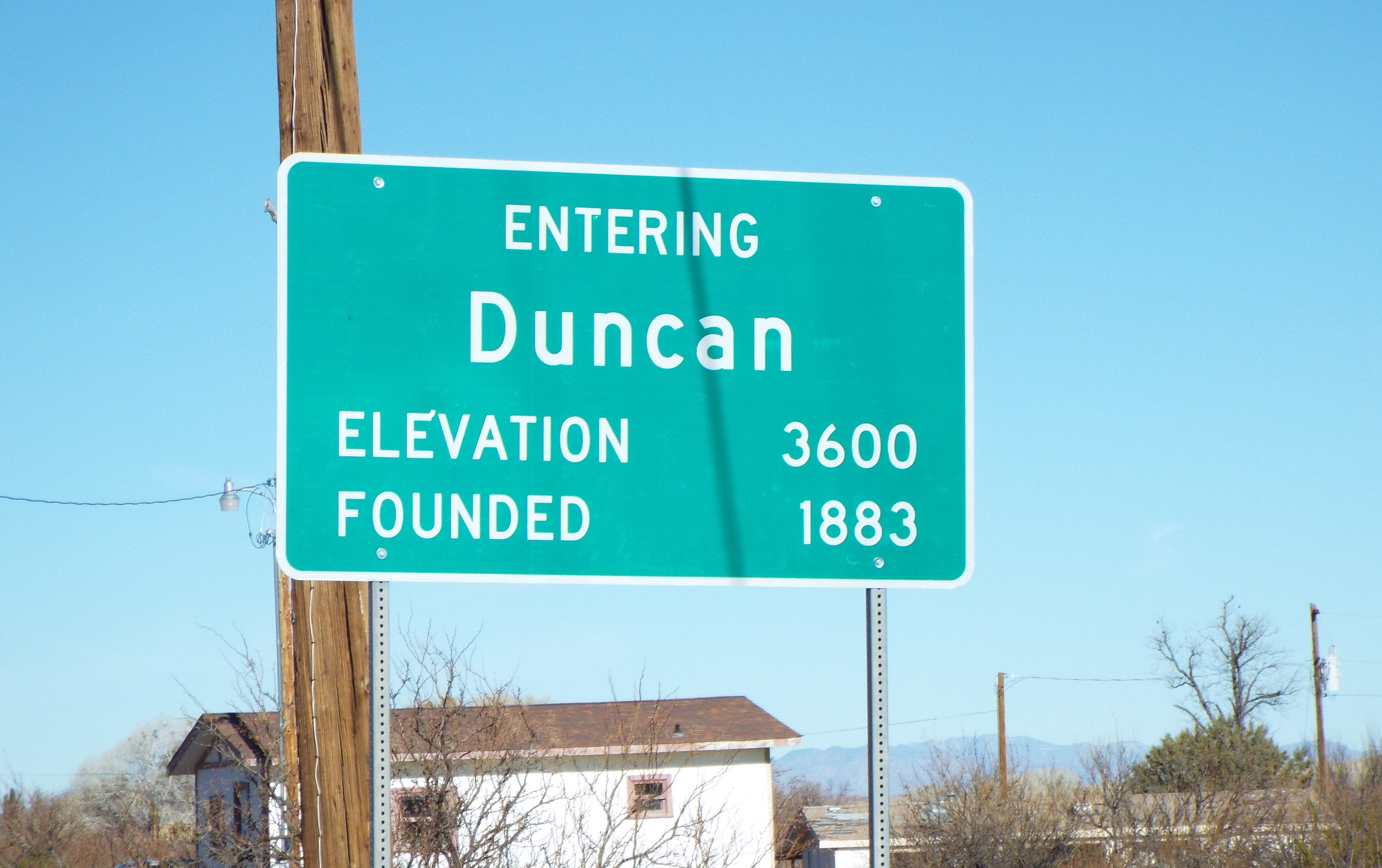
Duncan

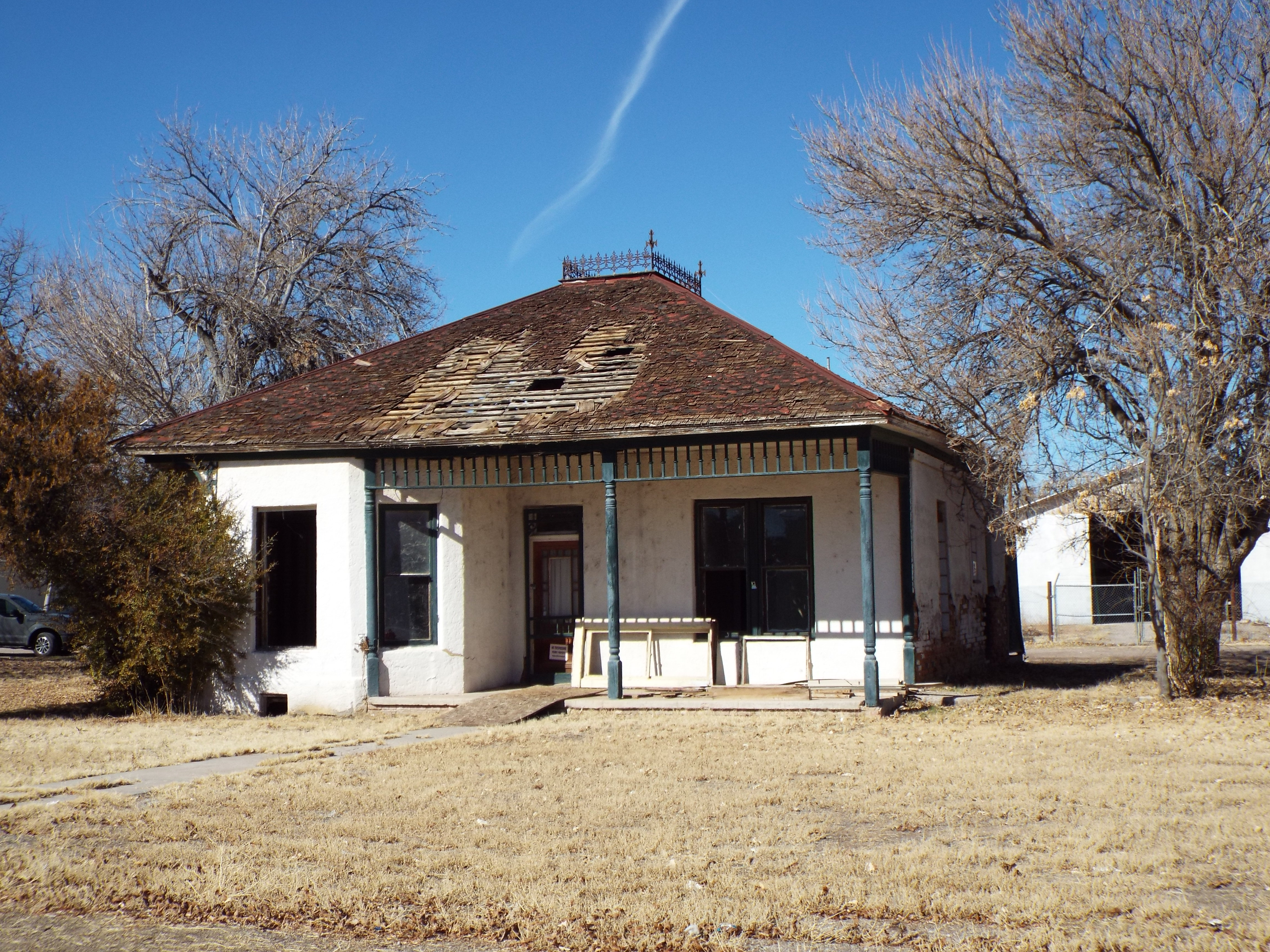
Benjamin F. Billingsley House - 1900

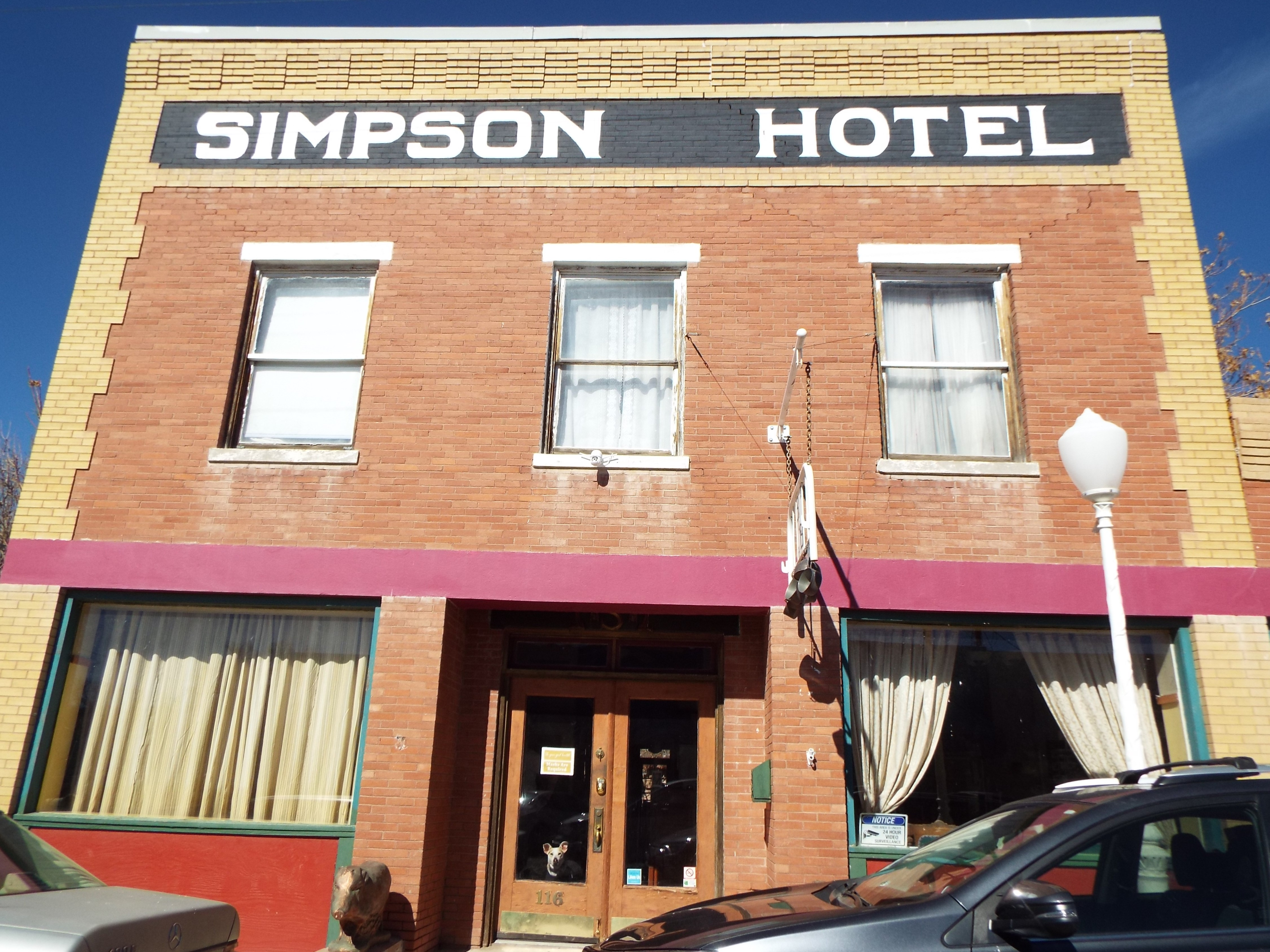
Simpson Hotel (former Hotel Hobbs) - 1914

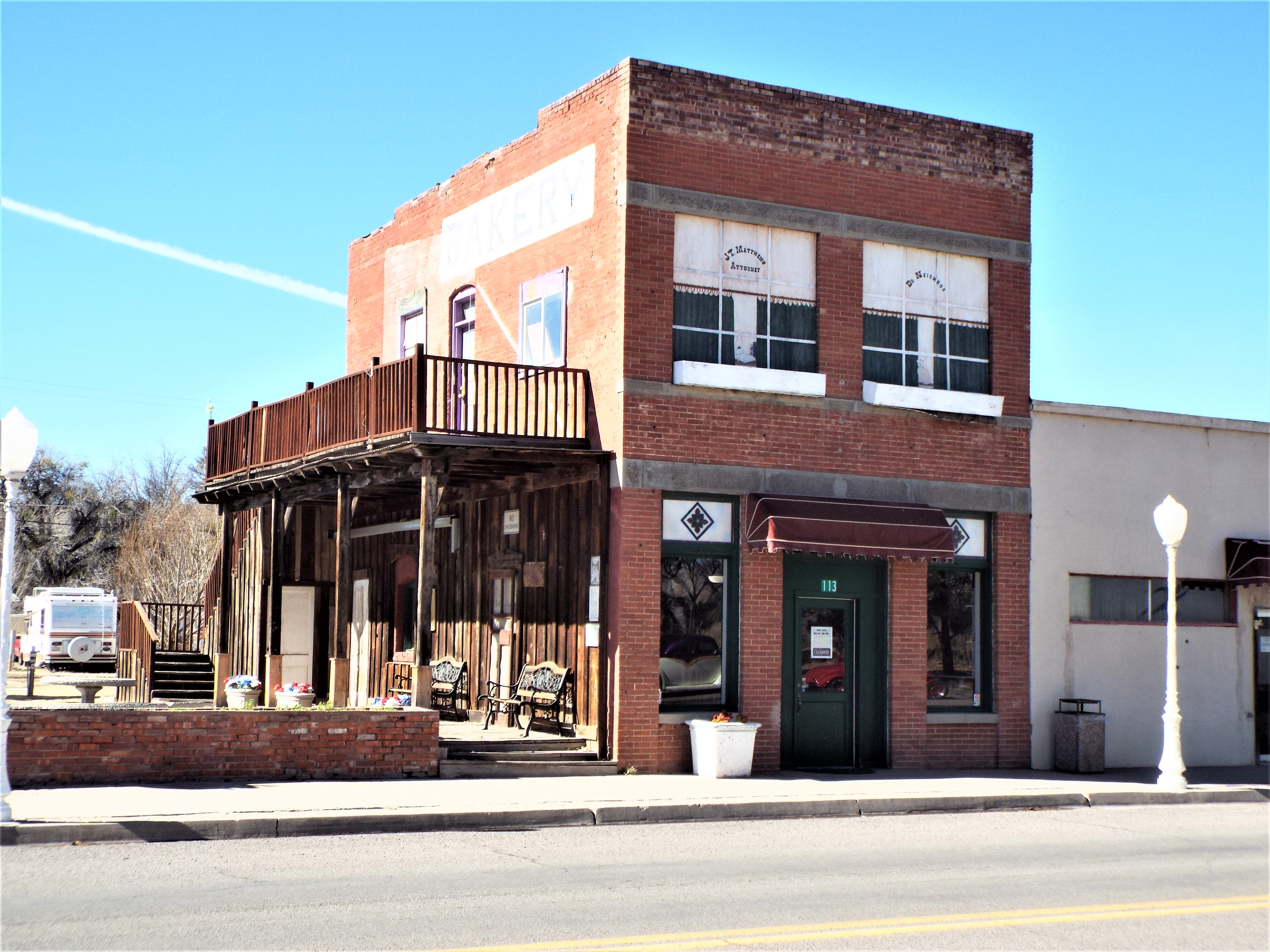
Freiheit Building - 1913

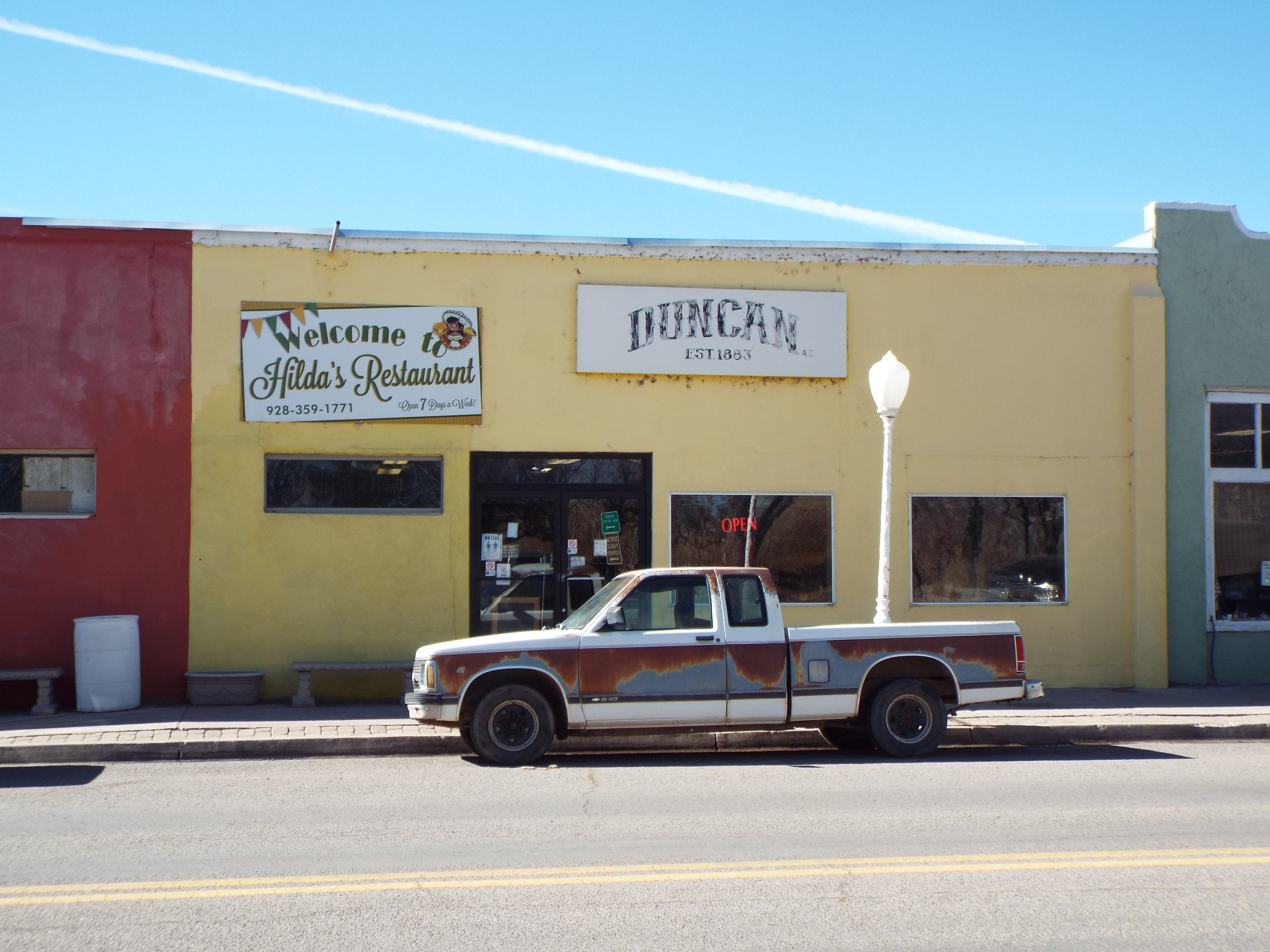
Country Store - 1909

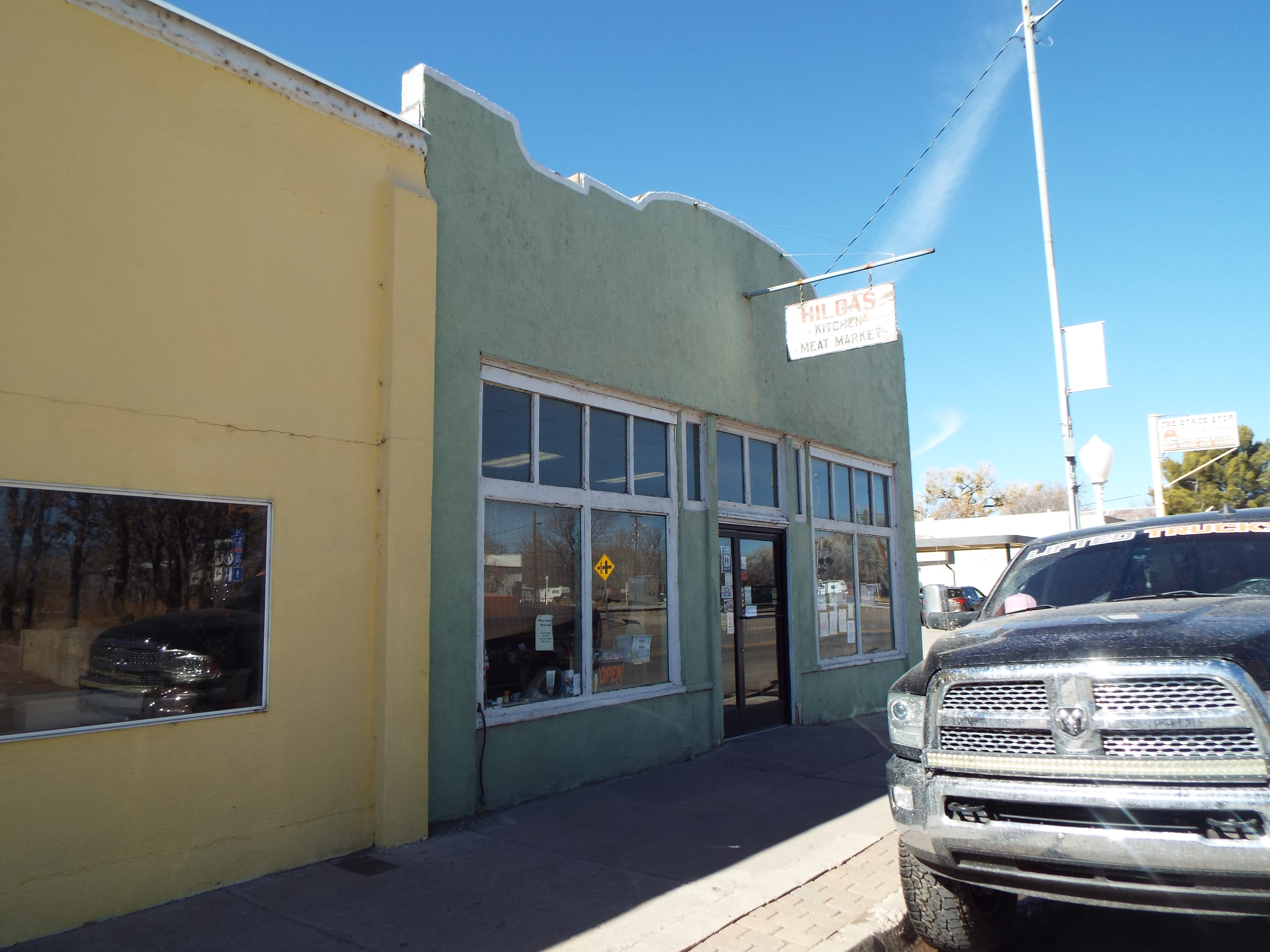
Duncan Restaurant - 1909

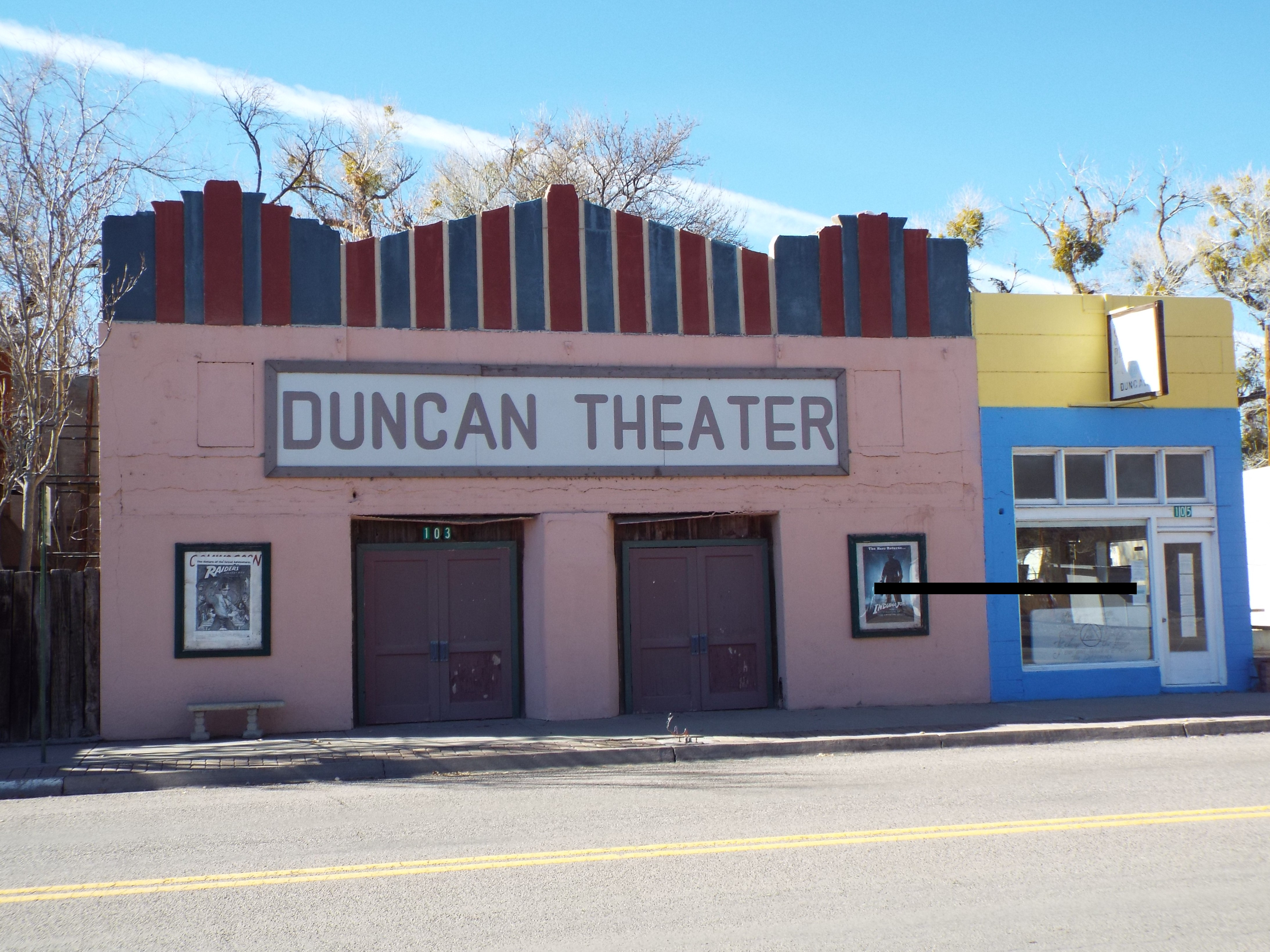
Duncan Theater - 1921

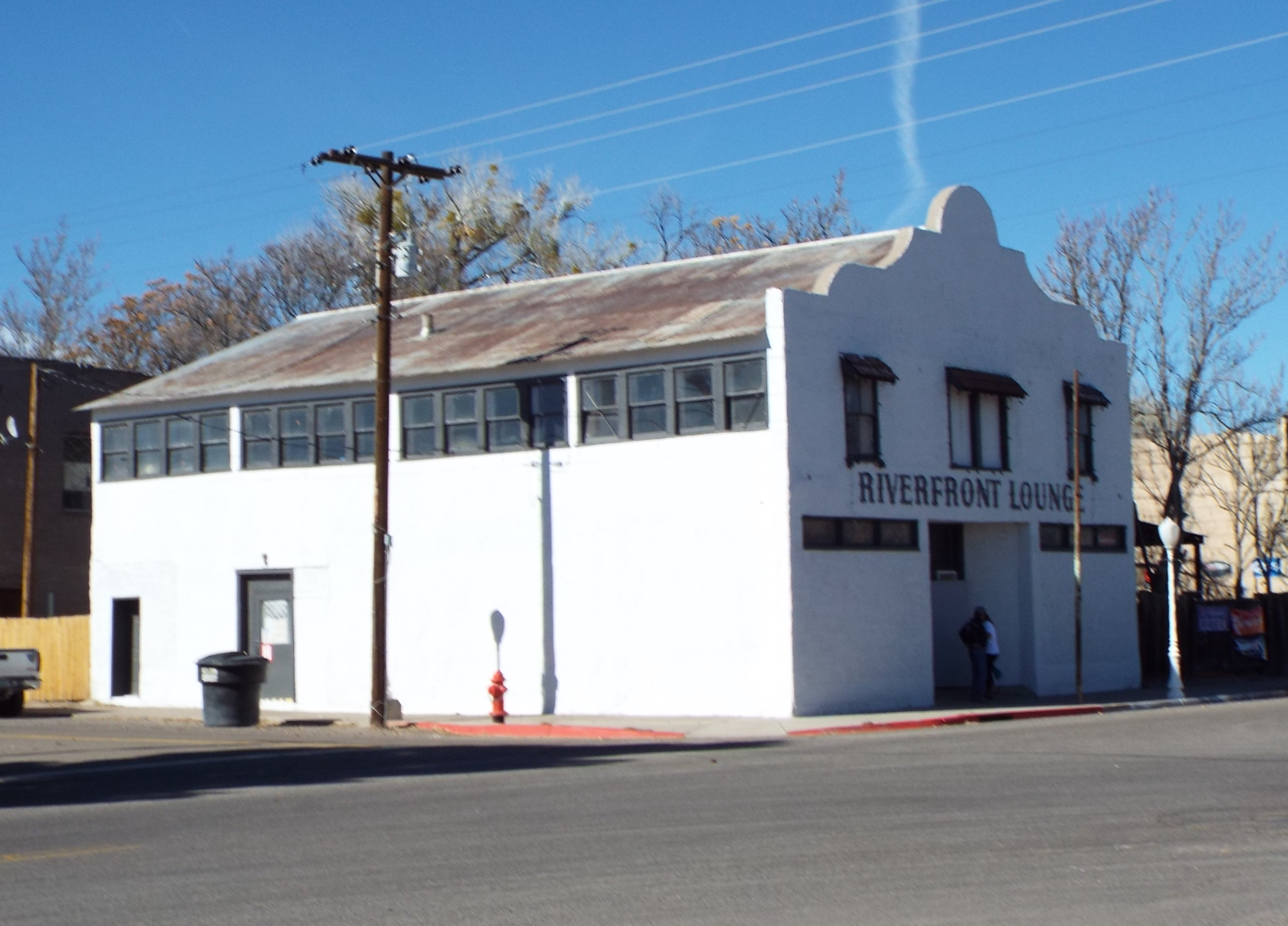
River Front Lounge (former Bonnie Heather Bar/Pool Hall) - 1925

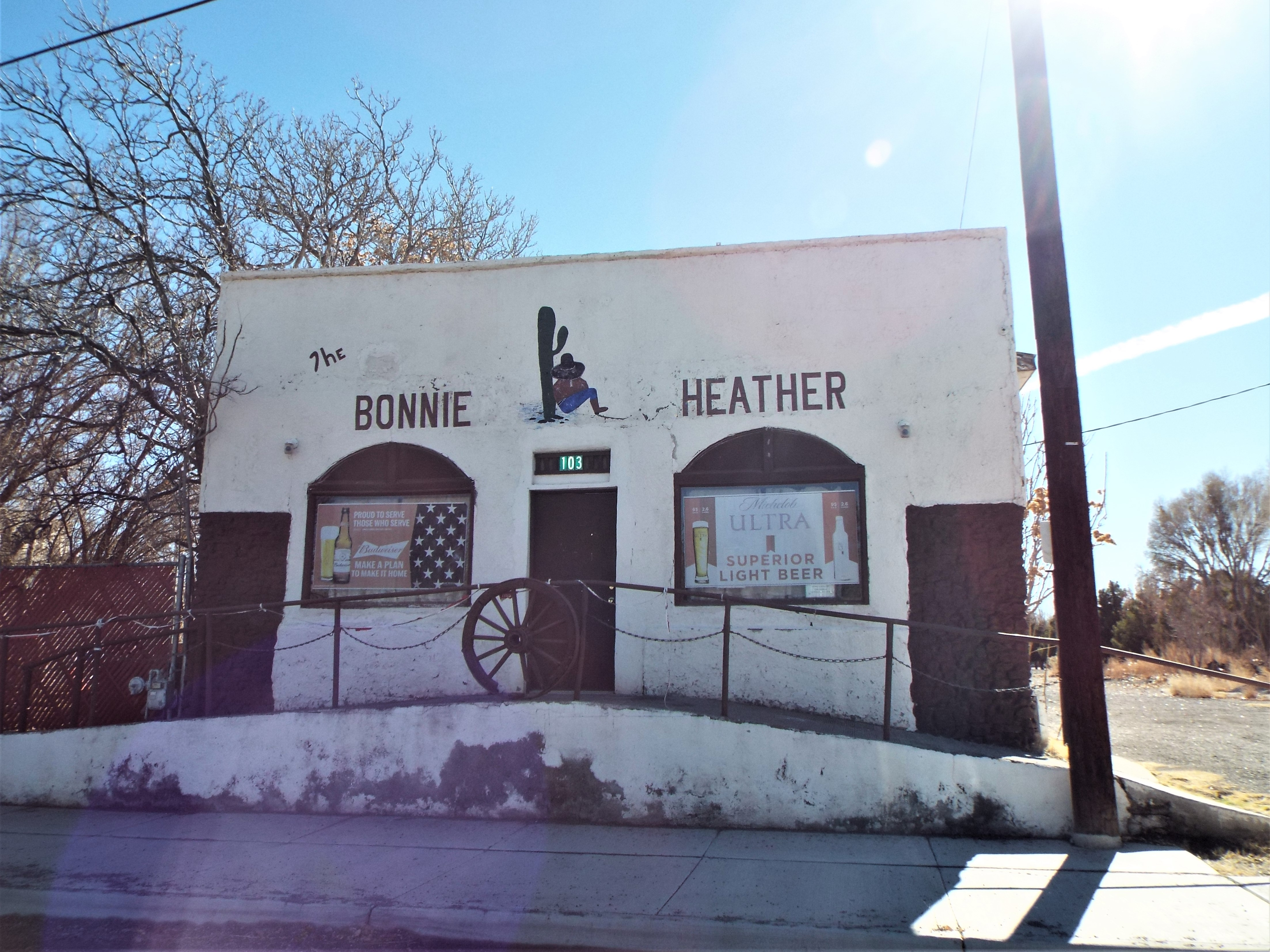
Bonnie Heather Inn - 1920

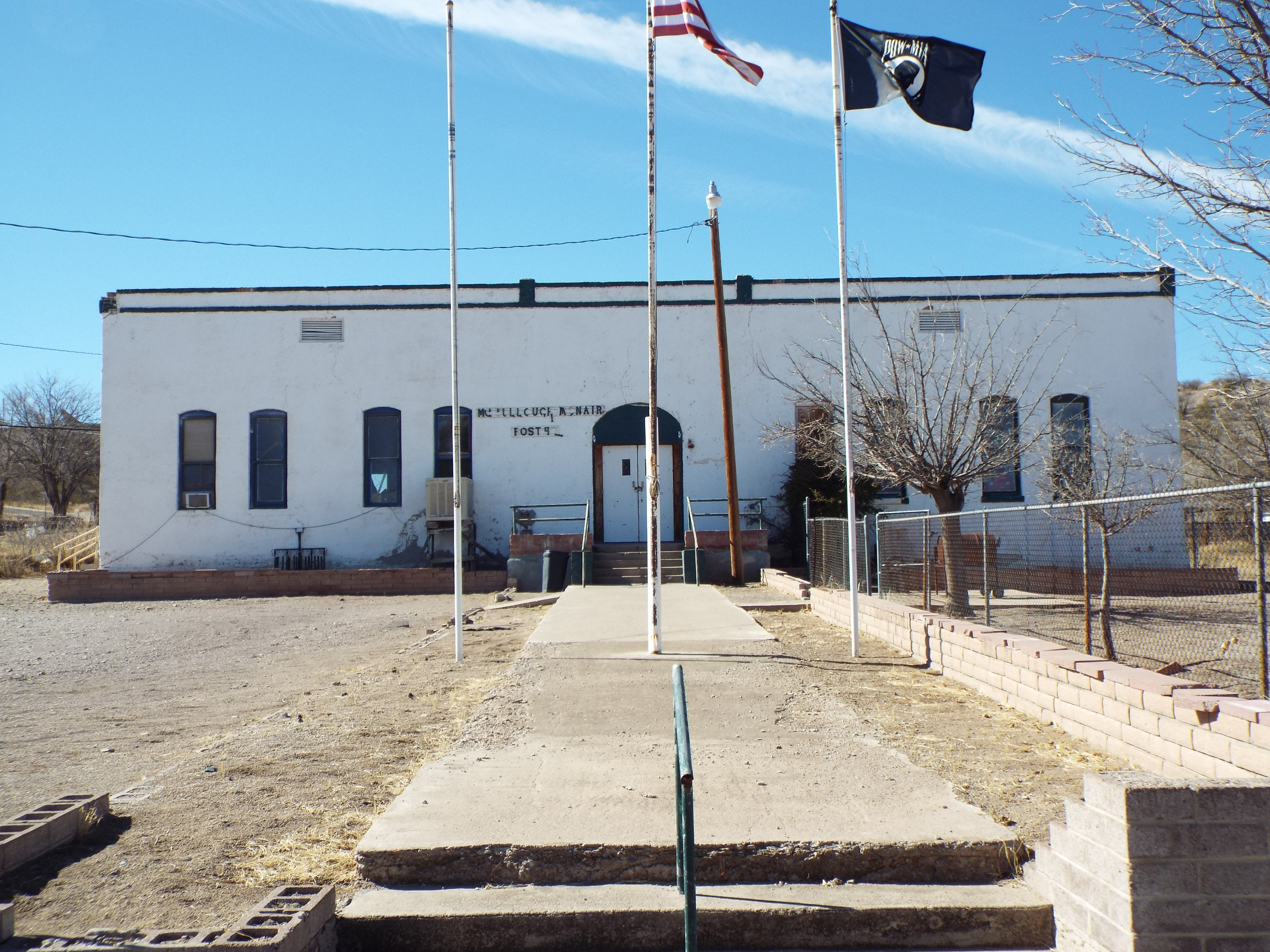
First Duncan School Building - 1908

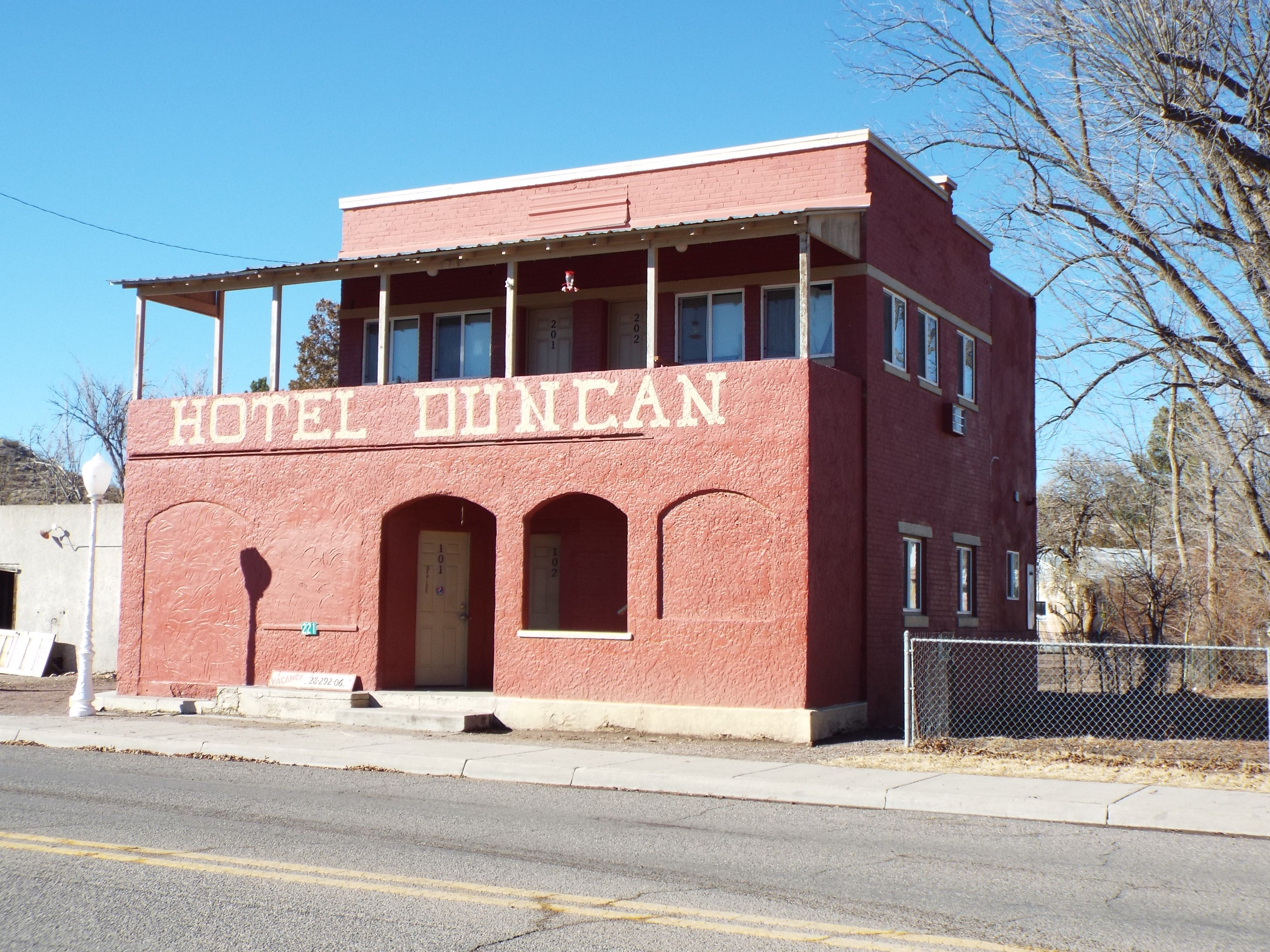
Old Duncan Bus Station now Hotel Duncan - 1920

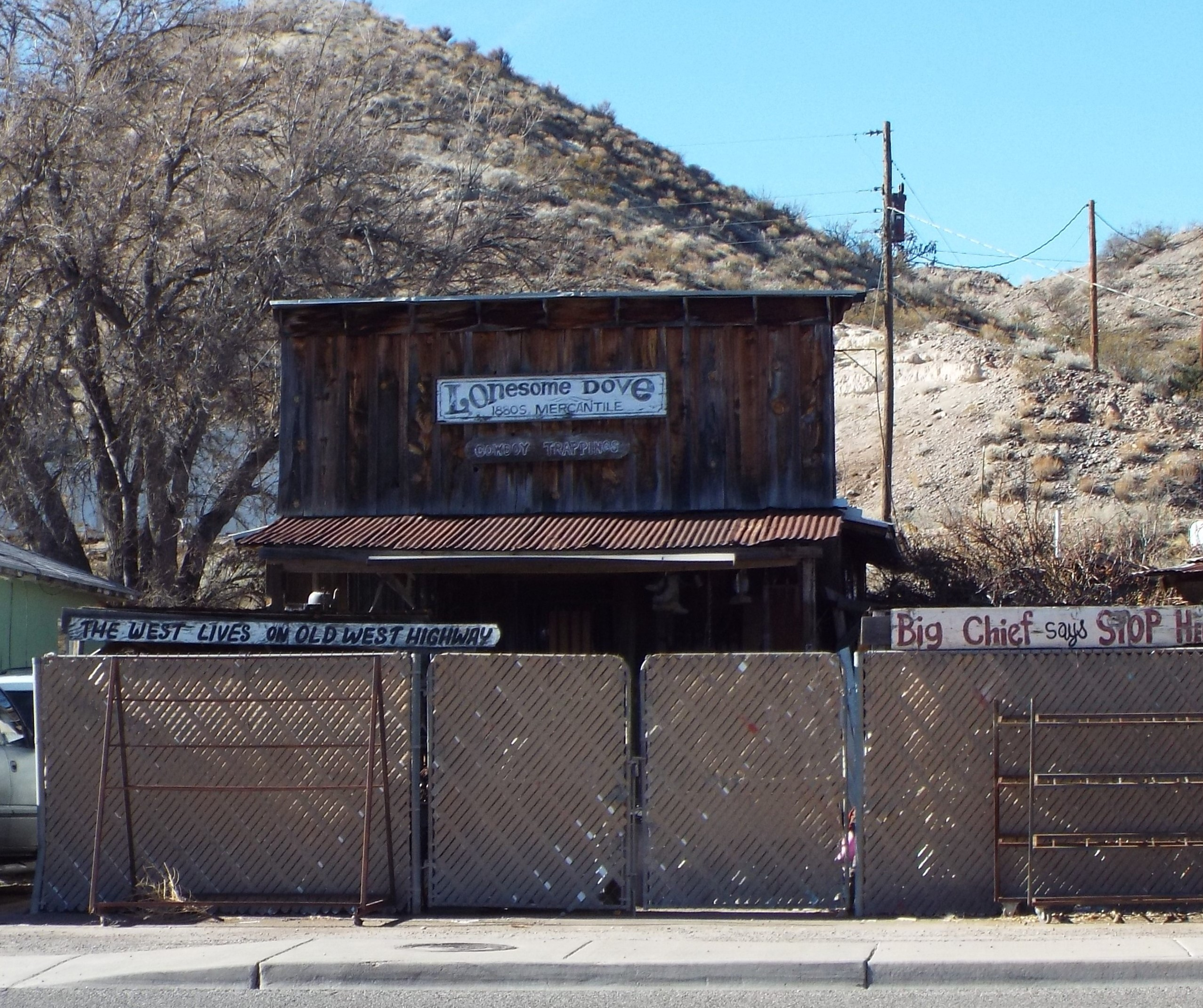
Lonesome Dove Mercantile - 1860

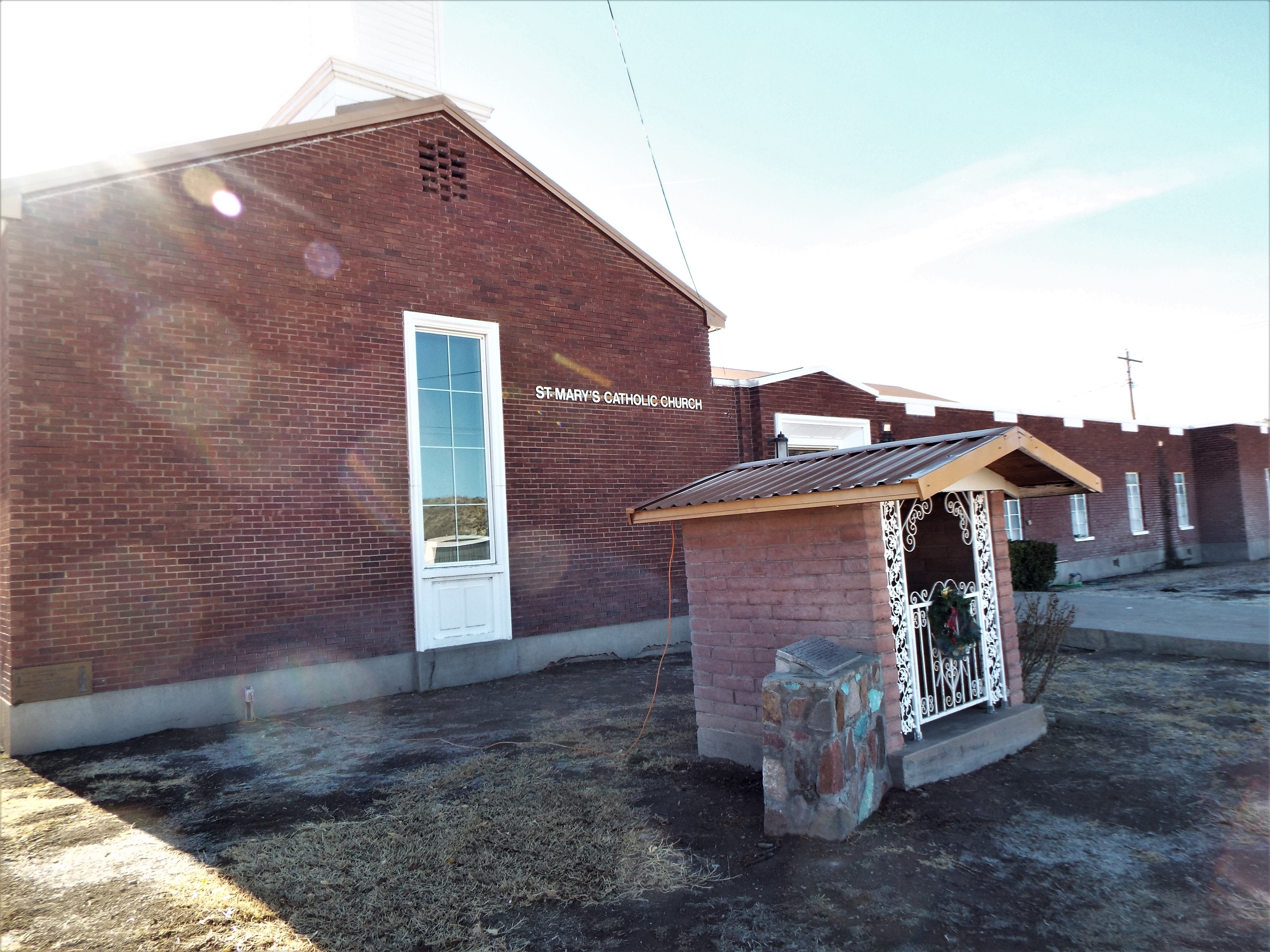
Saint Mary's Catholic Church - 1936

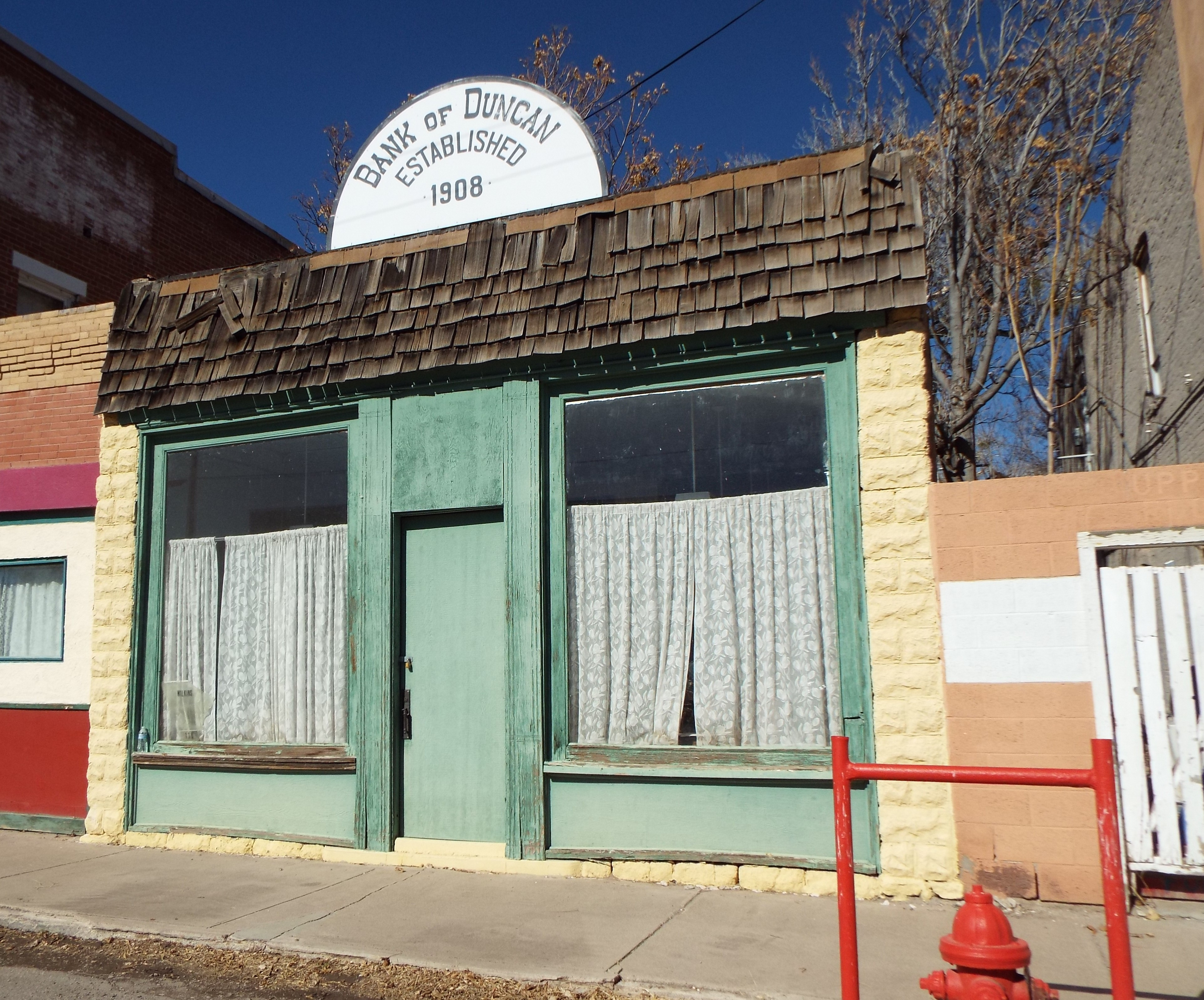
Bank of Duncan - 1908

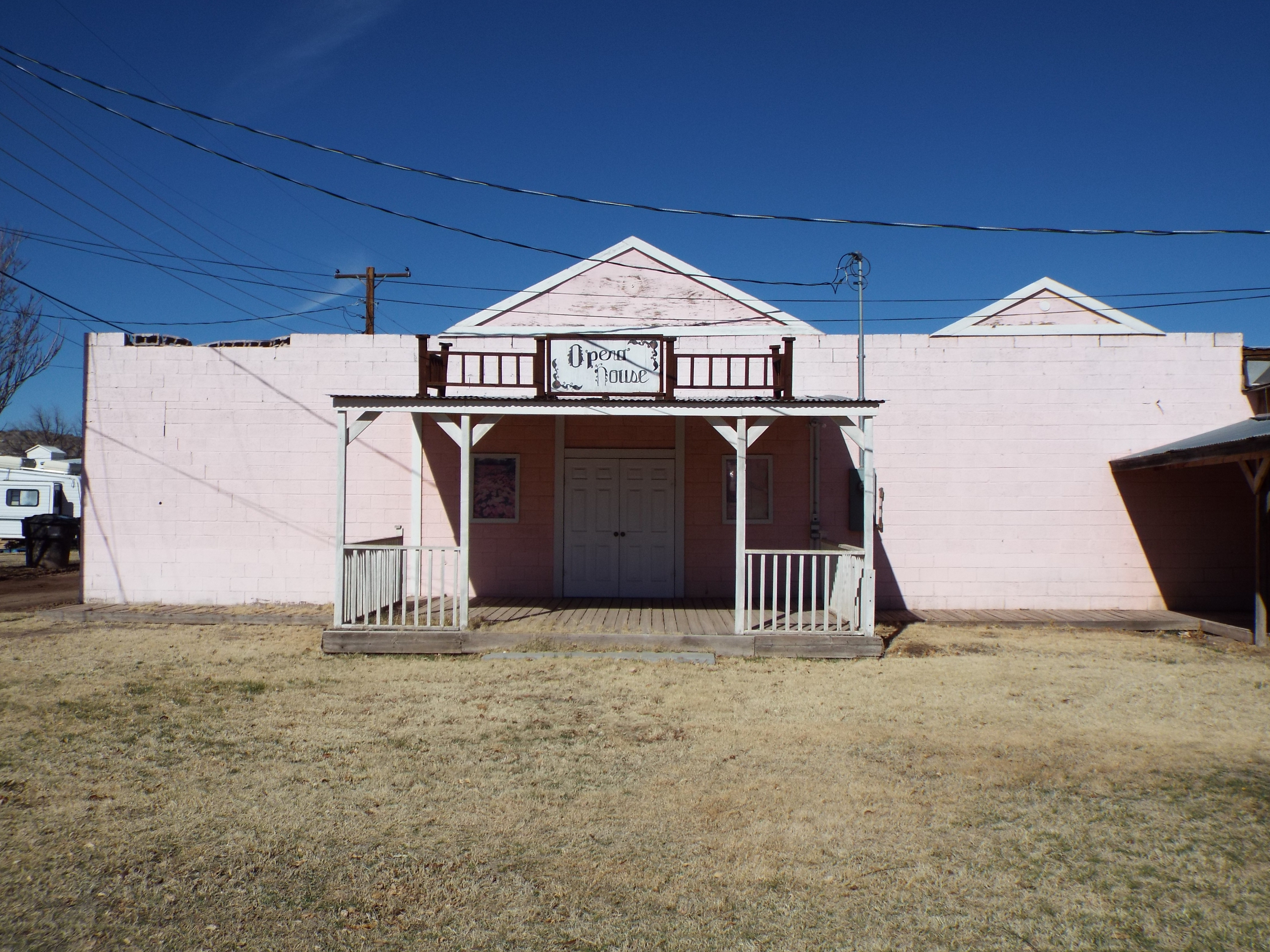
Duncan Opera House - 1920

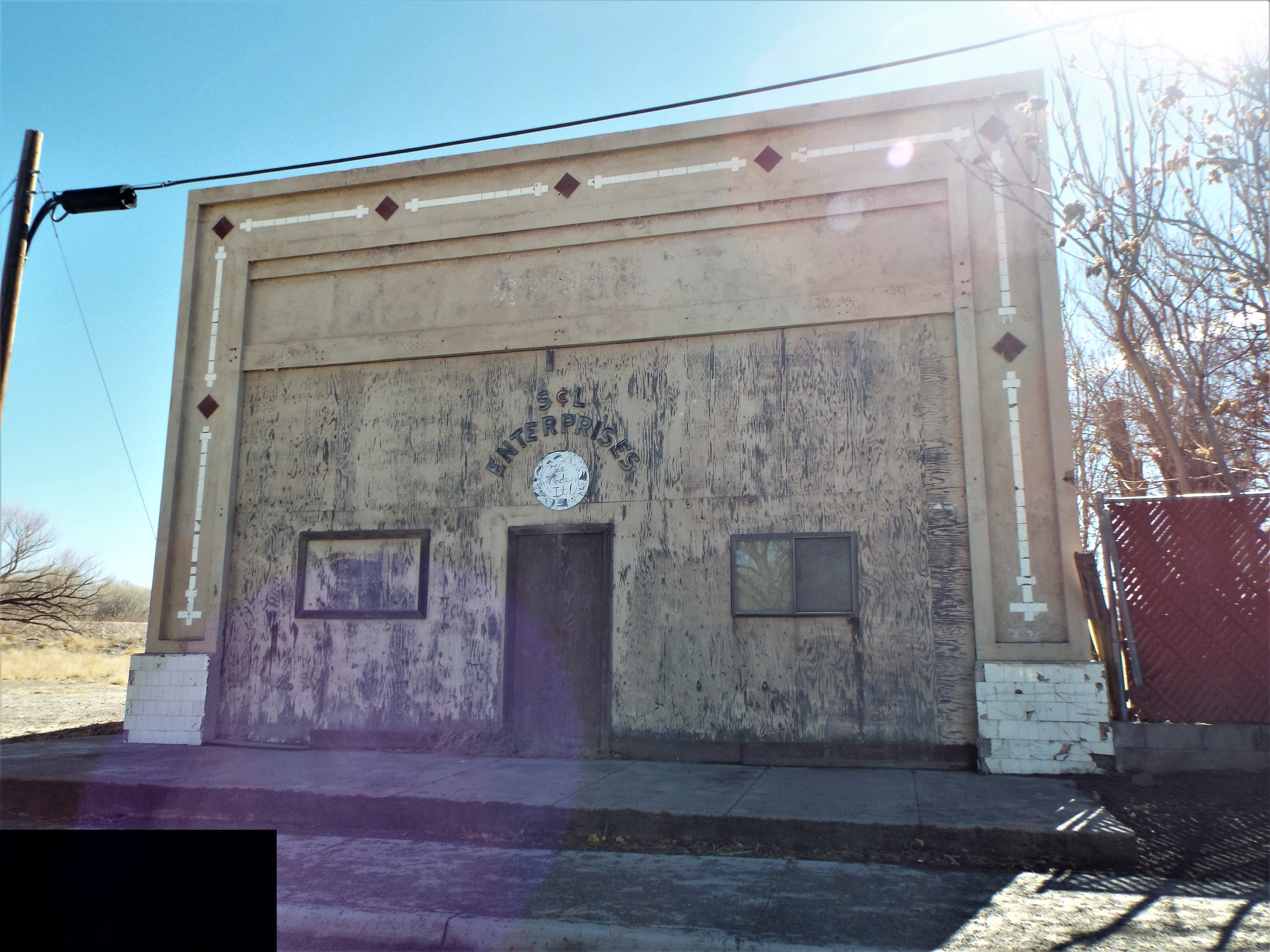
S & L Enterprises - 1896

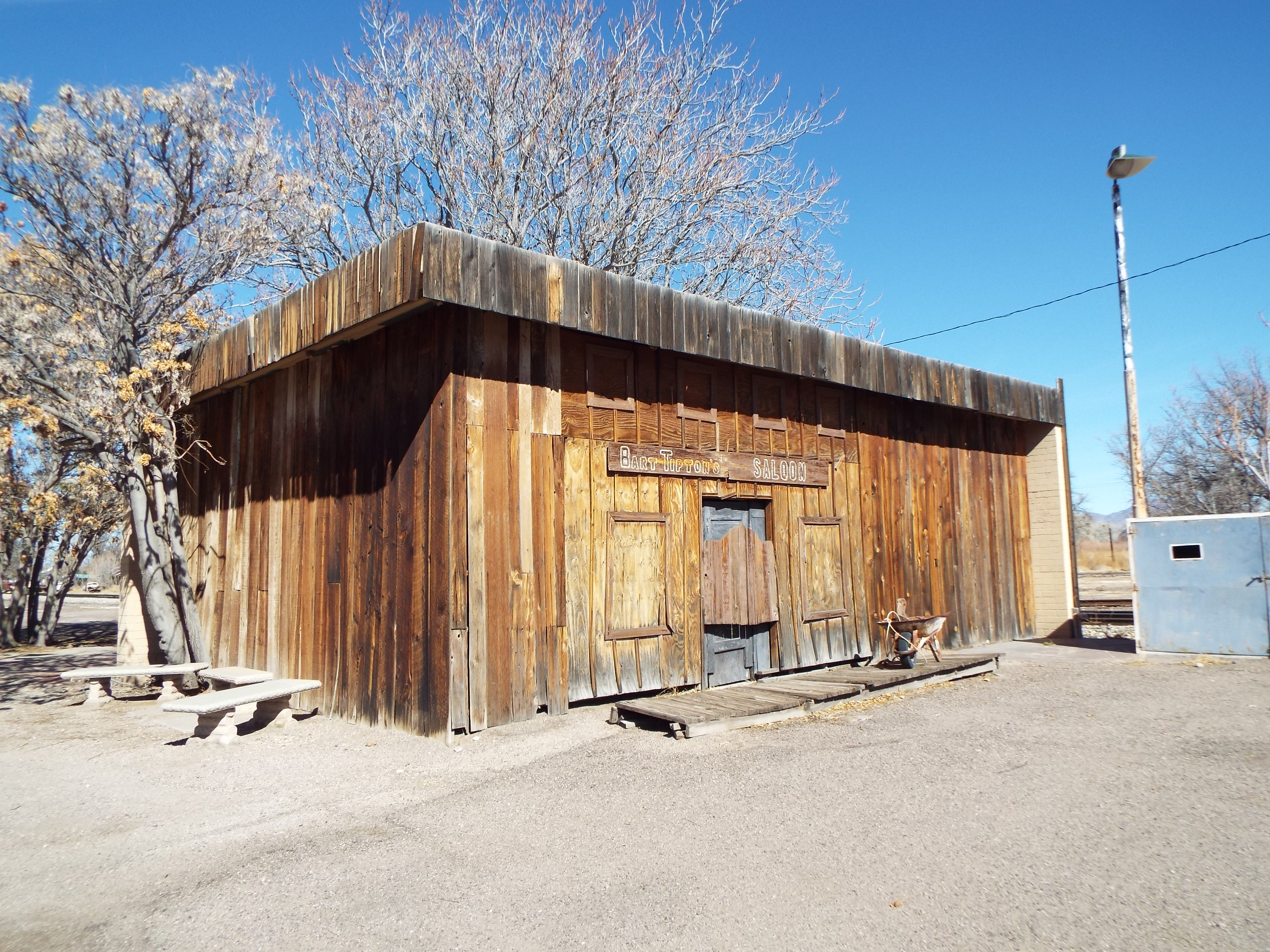
Bart Tipton's Saloon - 1905

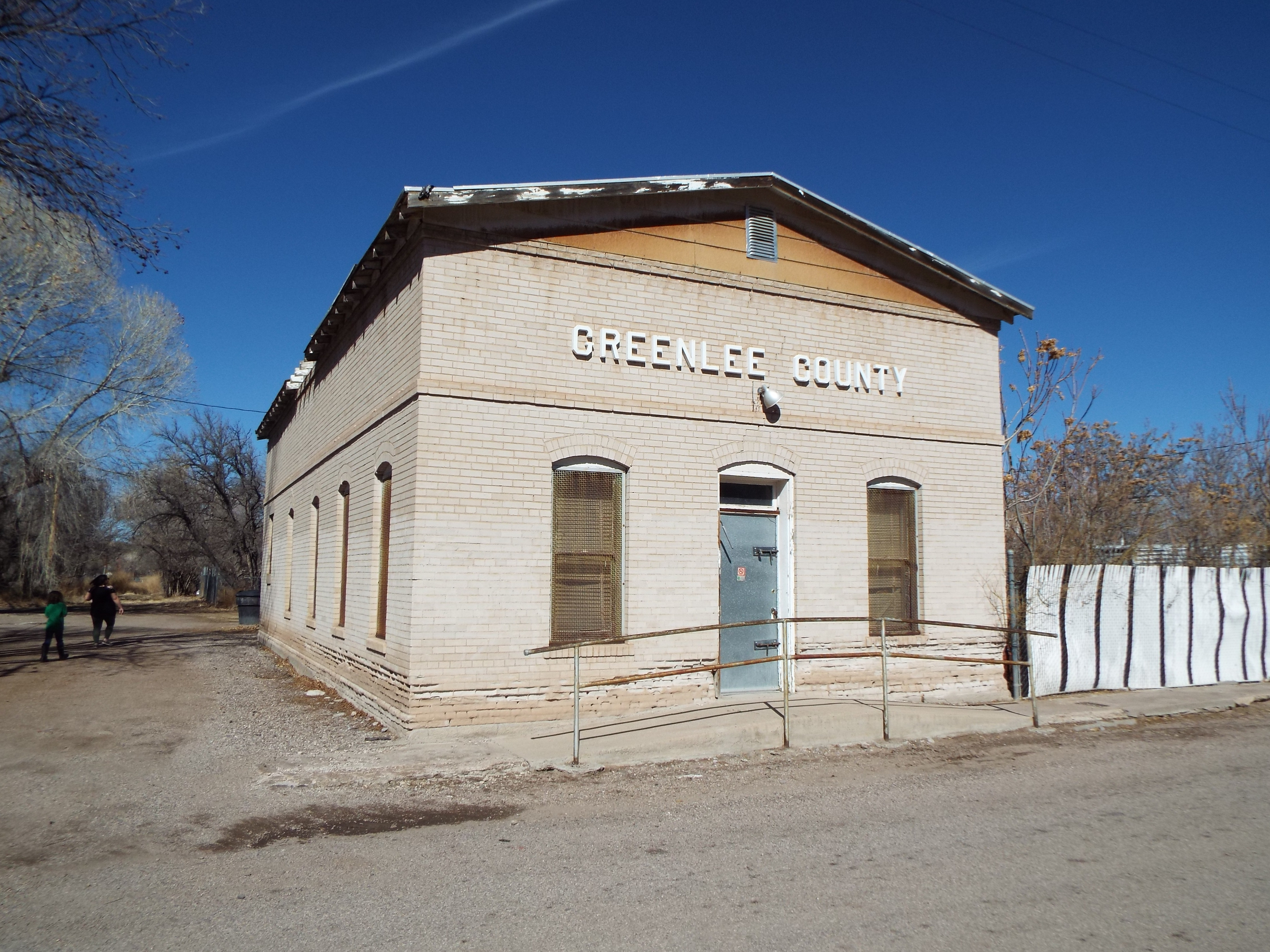
Greenlee County Building - 1890

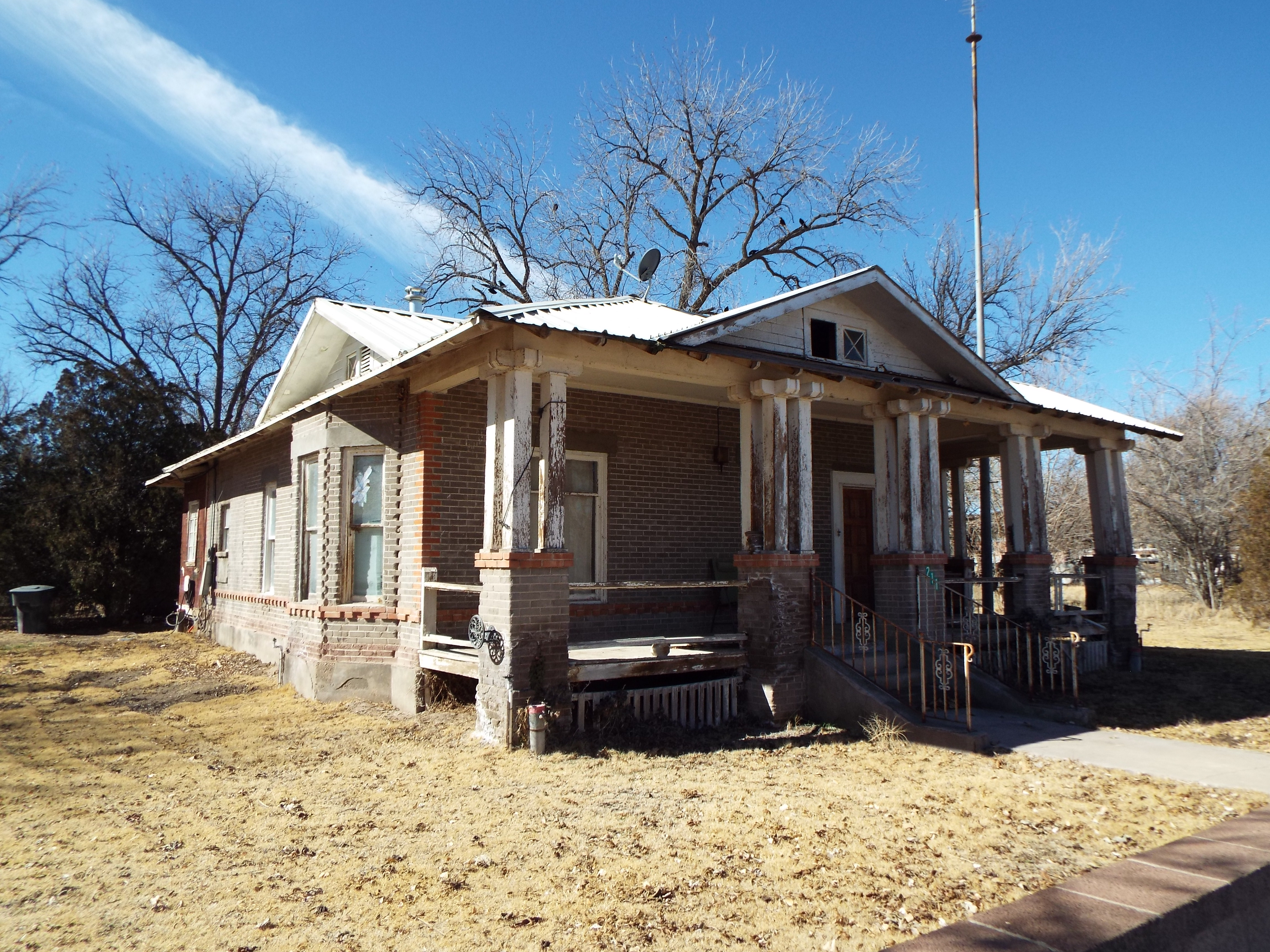
House on 211 Railroad Ave. - 1920

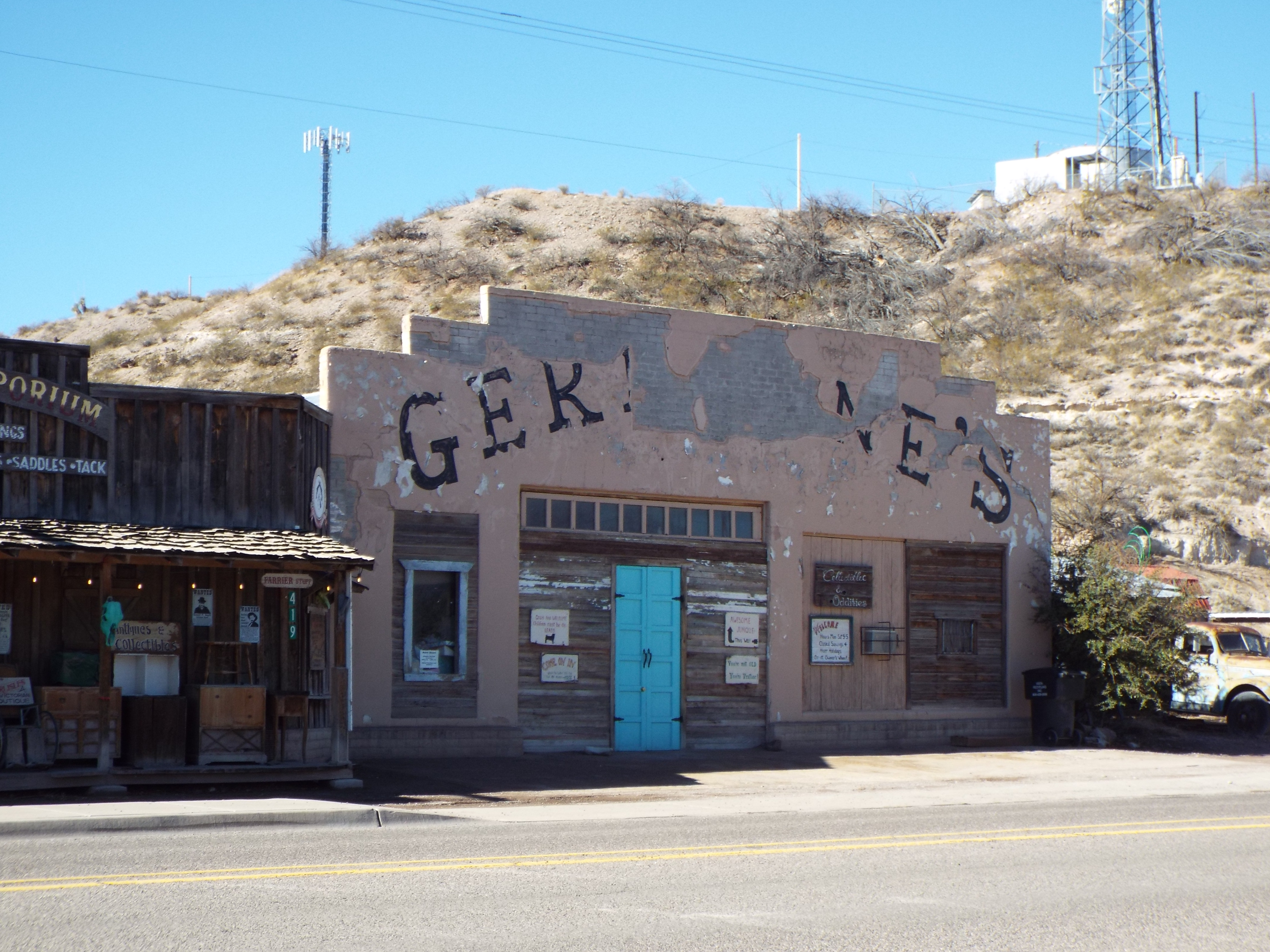
Germaine store - 1900

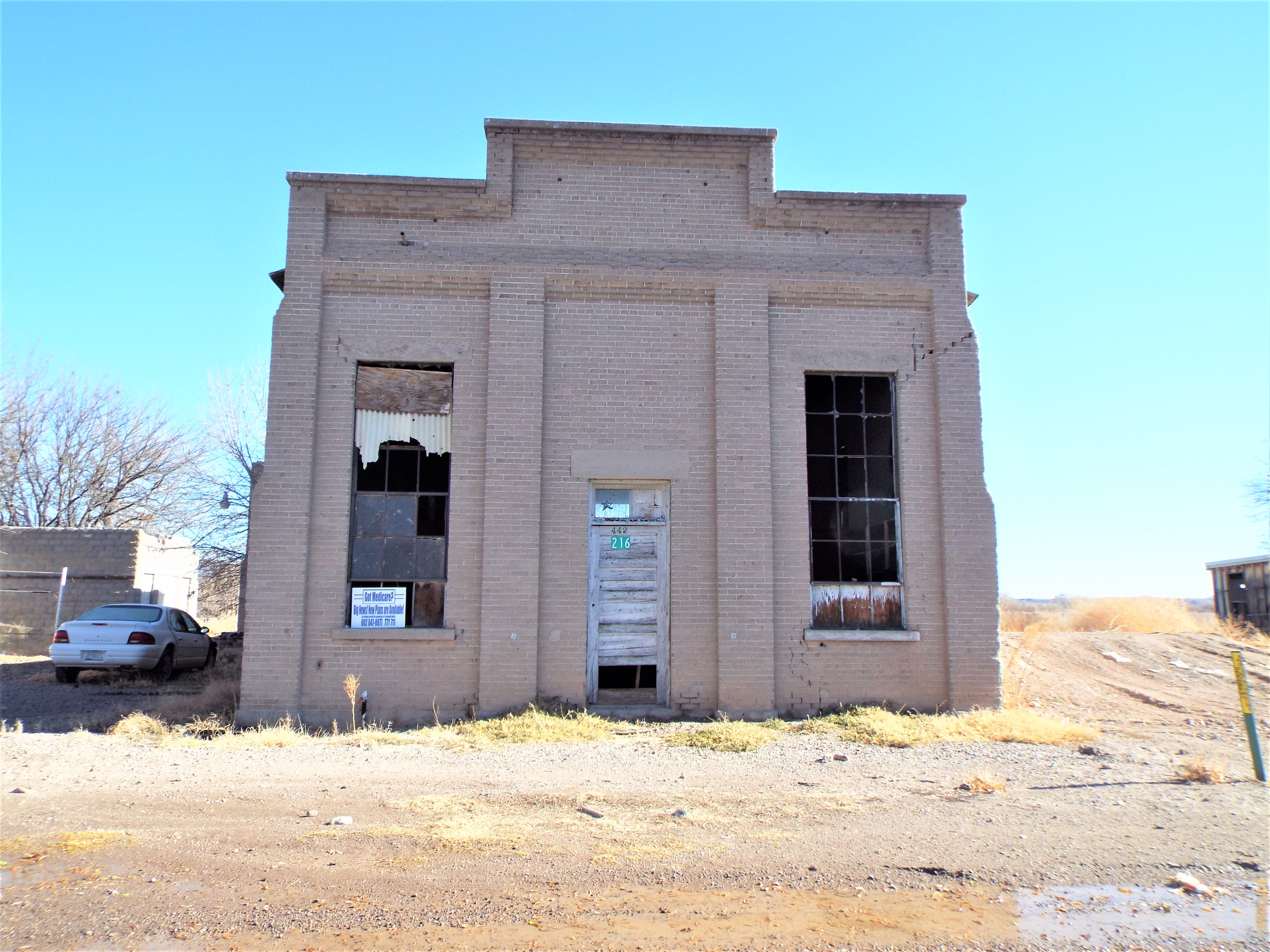
Knights of Pythias lodge #27 - 1900

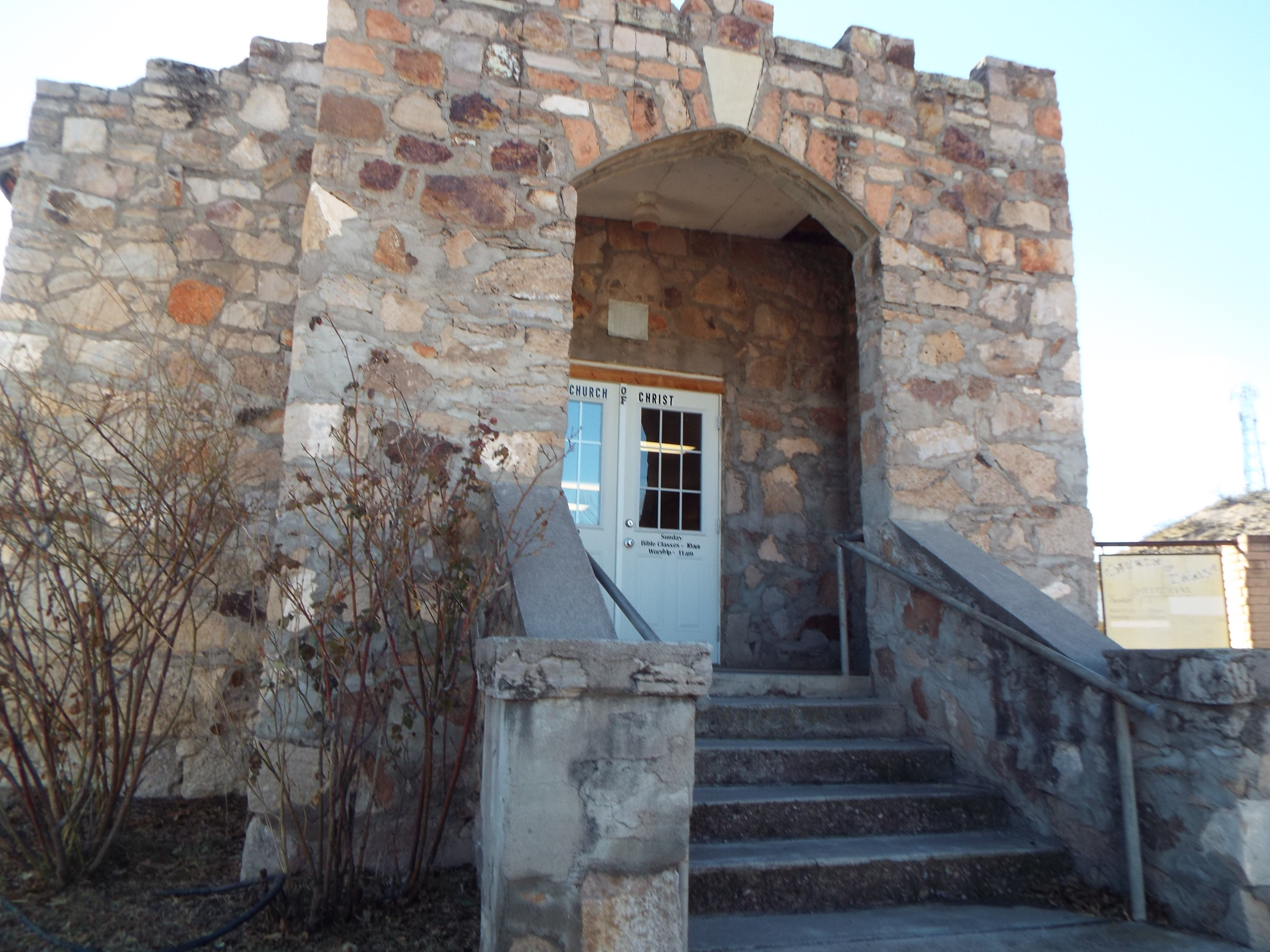
Duncan Church of Christ - 1914

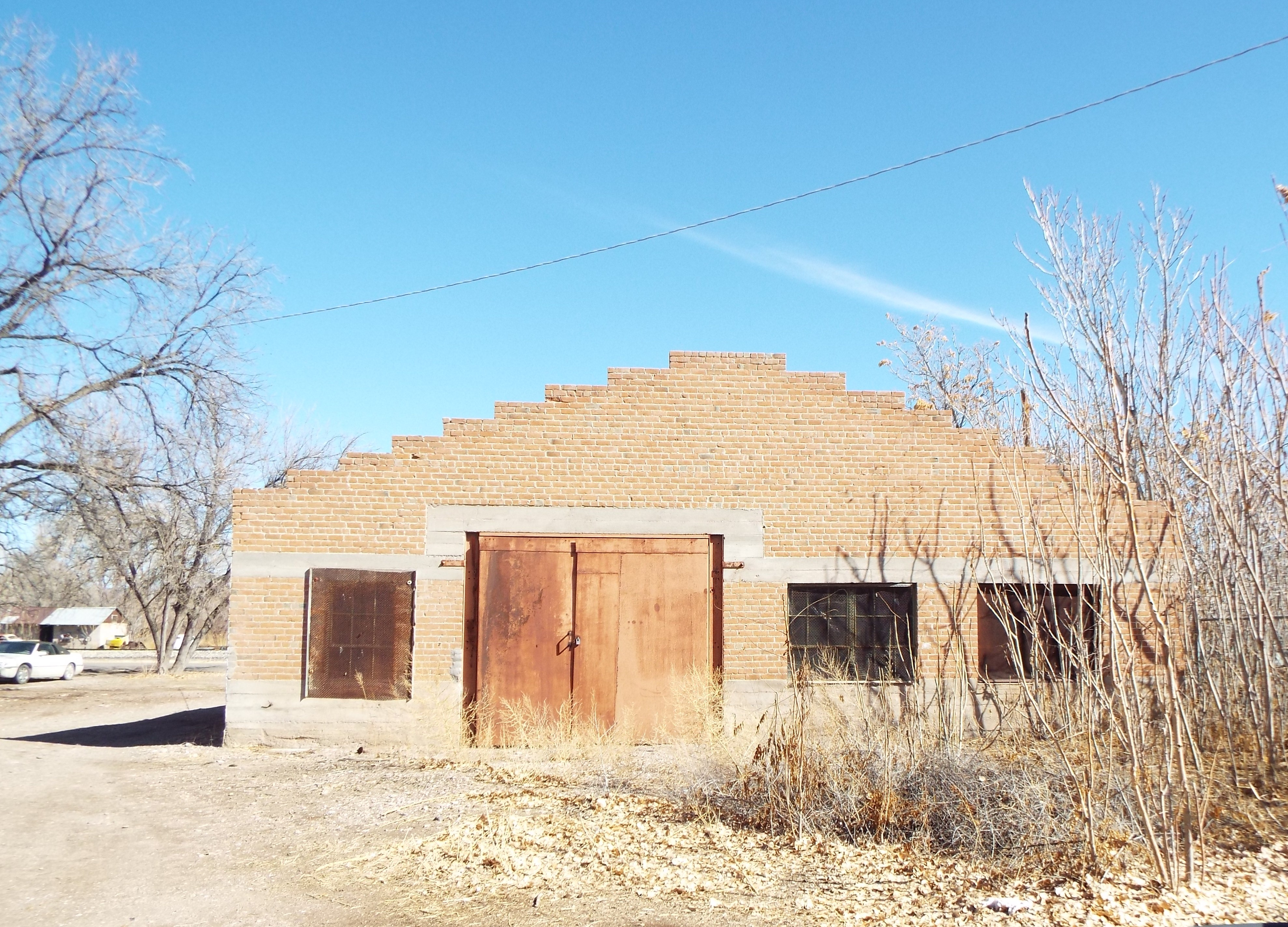
Duncan Stage Stop - 1890

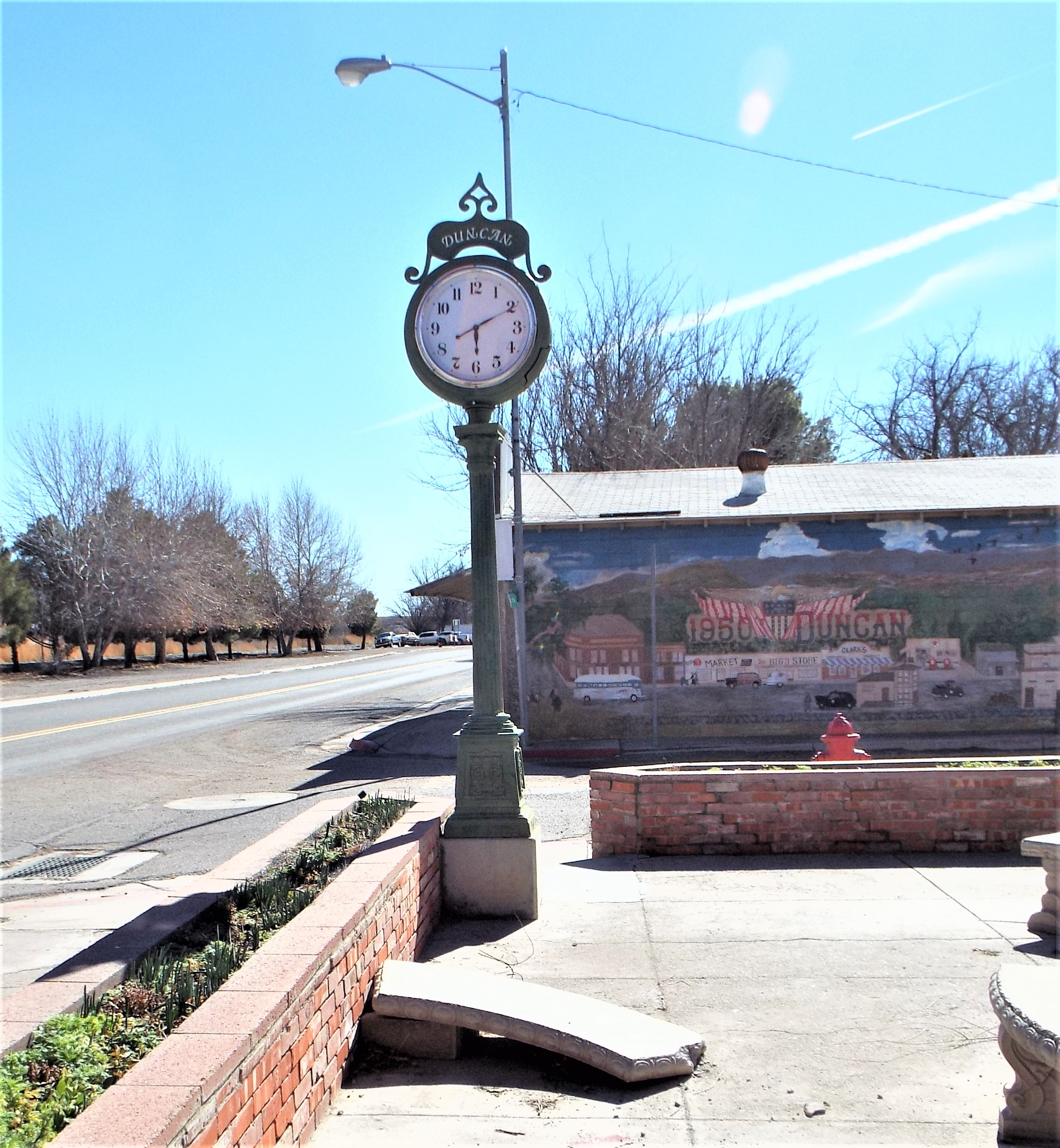
Antique town clock

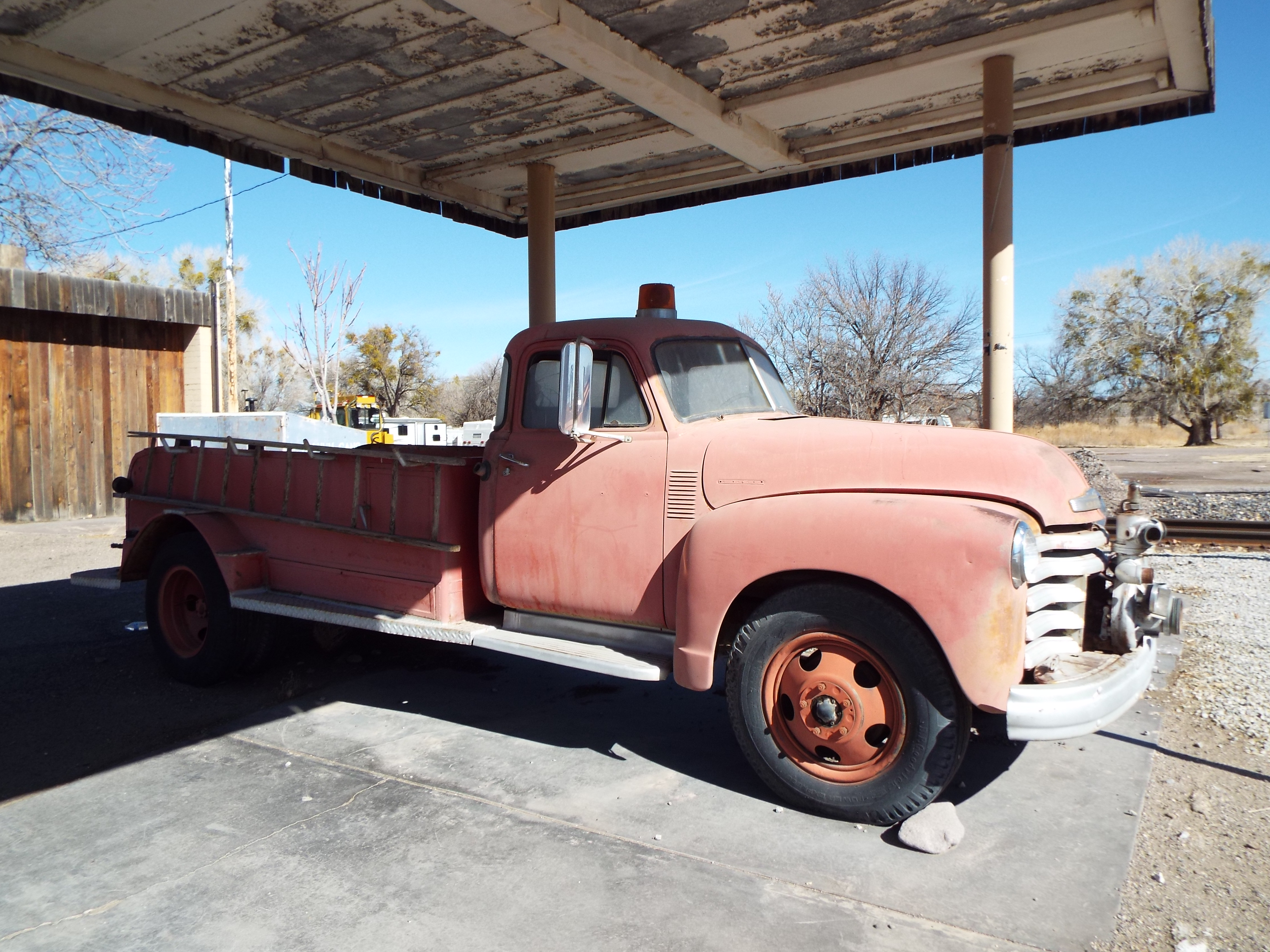
1950 Chevrolet 6400 2 ton fire truck

== See also ==
- National Register of Historic Places listings in Greenlee County, Arizona
