= National Register of Historic Places listings in Arizona =

This is a directory of properties and districts listed on the National Register of Historic Places in Arizona. There are 1,491 listed sites in the state, and each of its fifteen counties has at least ten listings on the National Register. Forty-seven of the state's sites are further designated as National Historic Landmarks.

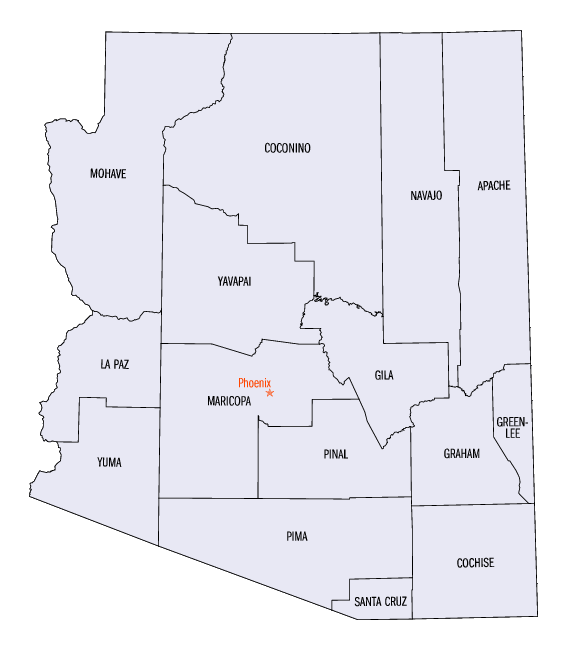
Arizona counties (clickable map)

Contents: NRHP listings by county in Arizona
Apache - Cochise - Coconino - Gila - Graham - Greenlee - La Paz - Maricopa (Phoenix) - Mohave - Navajo - Pima - Pinal - Santa Cruz - Yavapai (Prescott) - Yuma

This National Park Service list is complete through NPS recent listings posted October 9, 2026.

== Numbers of listings by county ==
The following are approximate tallies of current listings in Arizona on the National Register of Historic Places. These counts are based on entries in the National Register Information Database as of April 24, 2008 and new weekly listings posted since then on the National Register of Historic Places web site. There are frequent additions to the listings and occasional delistings, and the counts here are not official. Also, the counts in this table exclude boundary increase and decrease listings which modify the area covered by an existing property or district and which carry a separate National Register reference number.

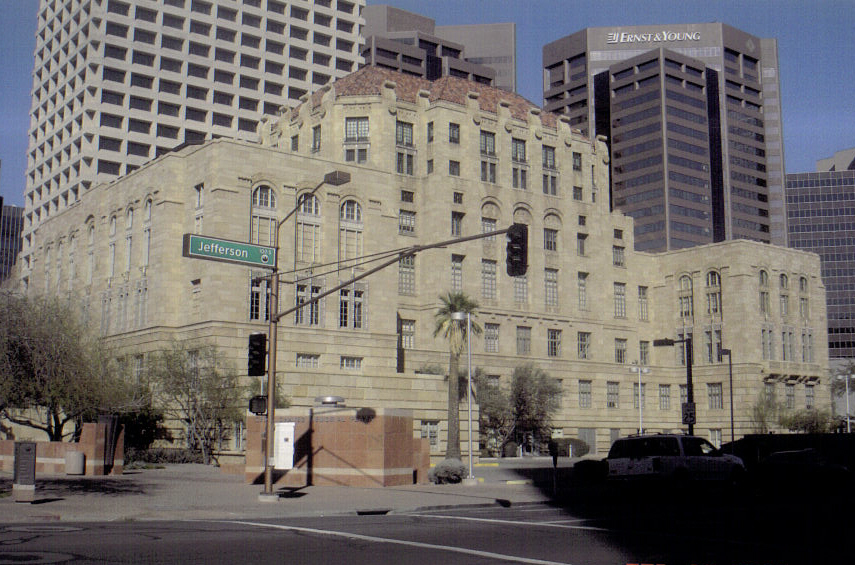
Maricopa County Courthouse, Phoenix

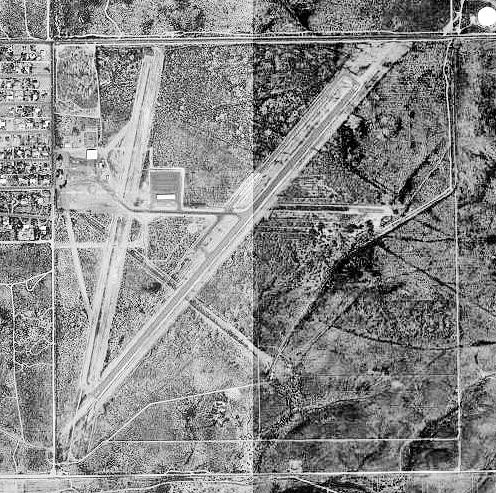
Douglas Municipal Airport

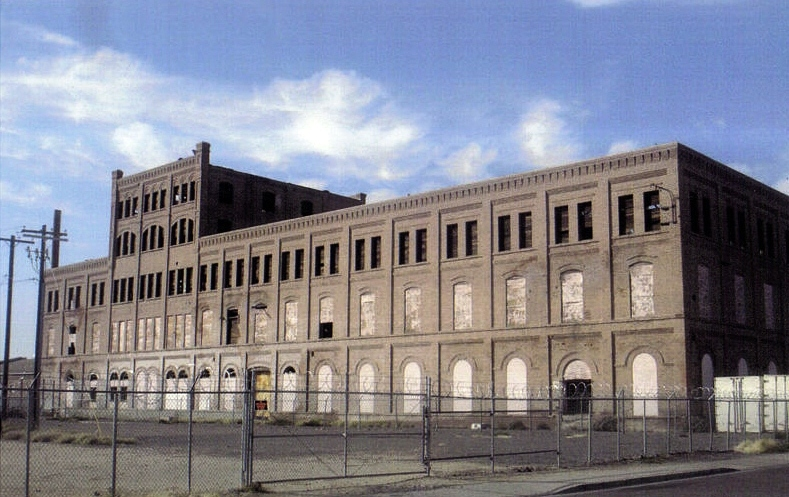
Sugar Beet Factory in Glendale

	County	# of Sites
1	Apache	34
2	Cochise	87
3	Coconino	155
4	Gila	53
5	Graham	34
6	Greenlee	10
7	La Paz	10
8.1	Maricopa: Phoenix	233
8.2	Maricopa: Other	205
8.3	Maricopa: Total	438
9	Mohave	70
10	Navajo	57
11	Pima	213
12	Pinal	108
13	Santa Cruz	53
14.1	Yavapai: Prescott	65
14.2	Yavapai: Other	69
14.3	Yavapai: Total	134
15	Yuma	57
(duplicates)		(7) (Note: The following sites are listed in multiple counties: Coolidge Dam (Gila and Pinal), El Camino Del Diablo (Pima and Yuma), Fossil Creek Bridge (Gila and Yavapai), Kentucky Camp Historic District (Pima and Santa Cruz), Los Robles Archeological District (Pima and Pinal), Sierra Bonita Ranch (Cochise and Graham), Theodore Roosevelt Dam National Register District (Gila and Maricopa))
Total:		1,506

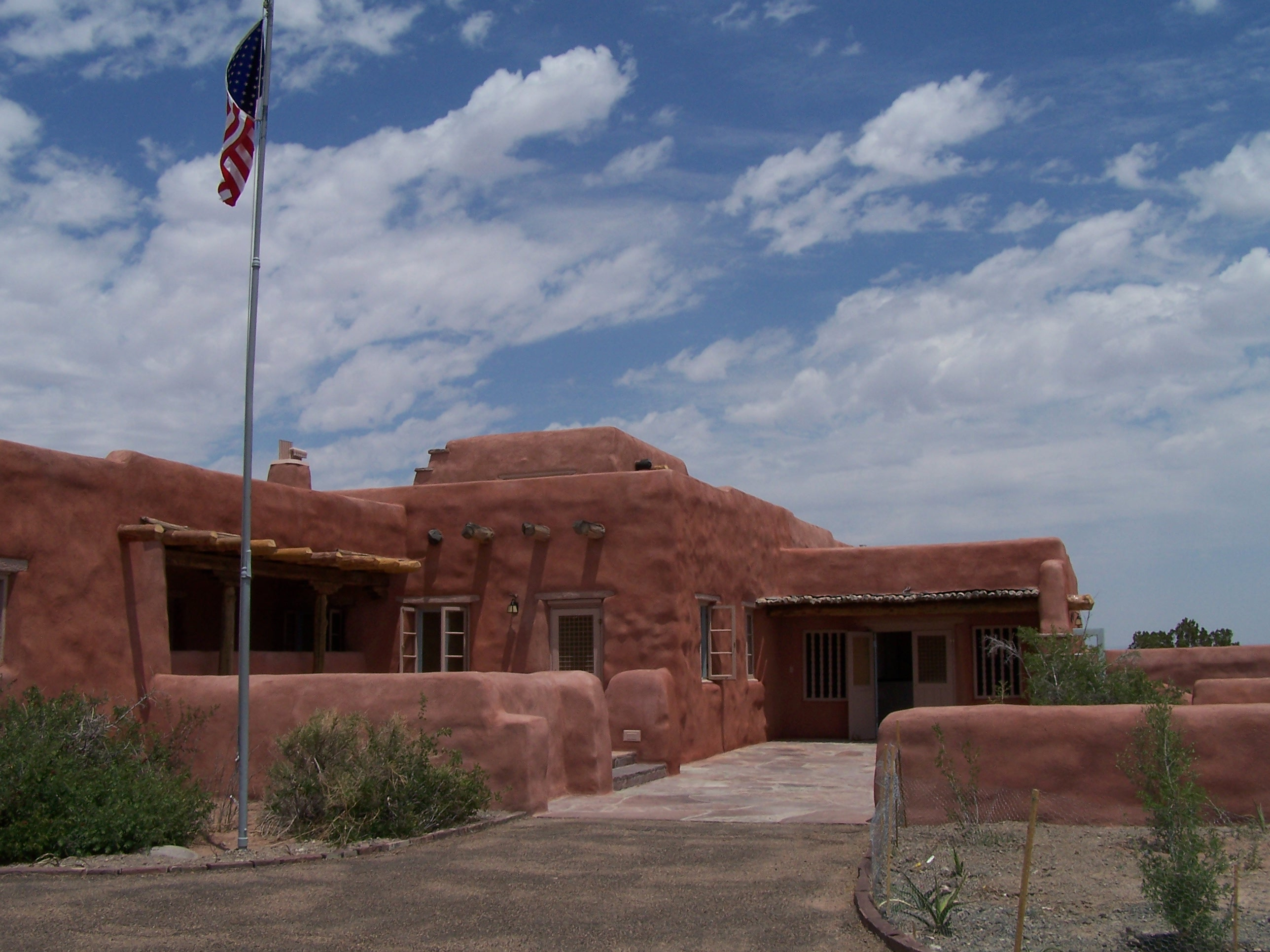
Painted Desert Inn

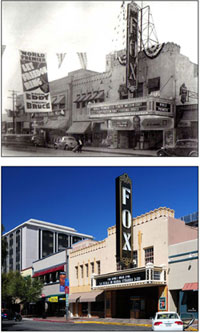
Fox Tucson Theatre then and now

== See also ==
- List of National Historic Landmarks in Arizona
- List of bridges on the National Register of Historic Places in Arizona
