= National Register of Historic Places listings in Greenlee County, Arizona =

Location of Greenlee County in Arizona

This is a list of the National Register of Historic Places listings in Greenlee County, Arizona.

This is intended to be a complete list of the properties and districts on the National Register of Historic Places in Greenlee County, Arizona, United States. The locations of National Register properties and districts for which the latitude and longitude coordinates are included below, may be seen in a map.

There are 10 properties and districts listed on the National Register in the county.

This National Park Service list is complete through NPS recent listings posted April 3, 2026.

== Current listings ==
	Name on the Register	Image	Date listed	Location	City or town	Description
1	Bear Mountain Lookout Complex		January 28, 1988 (#87002452)	Apache-Sitgreaves National Forest; 33°31′59″N 109°08′38″W	Mogollon Rim	
2	Benjamin F. Billingsley House	Benjamin F. Billingsley House	August 25, 1983 (#83002998)	202 Main St. 32°43′16″N 109°06′22″W	Duncan	
3	Black Gap Bridge	Black Gap Bridge	September 30, 1988 (#88001627)	Old Safford Rd., 7.8 miles southwest of Clifton; 32°56′47″N 109°19′10″W	Clifton vicinity	
4	Clifton Casa Grande Building	Clifton Casa Grande Building	June 26, 1979 (#79003445)	8 Park Ave. 33°03′26″N 109°17′56″W	Clifton	
5	Clifton Townsite Historic District	Clifton Townsite Historic District	March 1, 1990 (#90000339)	Confluence of Chase Creek and the San Francisco River; 33°03′20″N 109°17′53″W	Clifton	
6	Gila River Bridge	Gila River Bridge	September 30, 1988 (#88001628)	Old Safford Rd., 6.8 miles southeast of Clifton; 32°57′55″N 109°18′32″W	Clifton vicinity	Luten Arch bridge built in 1918.
7	Park Avenue Bridge	Park Avenue Bridge	September 30, 1988 (#88001661)	Park Ave. over the San Francisco River; 33°03′22″N 109°17′55″W	Clifton	
8	Dell Potter Ranch House		August 3, 1977 (#77000236)	North of Clifton; 33°04′57″N 109°18′11″W	Clifton vicinity	
9	Solomonville Road Overpass	Solomonville Road Overpass	September 30, 1988 (#88001626)	Old Safford Rd., 3.6 miles south of Clifton; 32°59′41″N 109°17′19″W	Safford	
10	Solomonville Road Overpass	Solomonville Road Overpass	September 30, 1988 (#88001625)	Old Safford Rd., 4.5 miles south of Clifton; 32°58′29″N 109°18′03″W	Clifton vicinity	

== See also ==
- List of National Historic Landmarks in Arizona
- National Register of Historic Places listings in Arizona
