= Dell Potter Ranch House =

- U.S. National Register of Historic Places
- Location within Arizona
- Location: 502 Potter Ranch Lane, near Clifton, Arizona
- Coordinates: 33°04′57″N 109°18′11″W
- Area: 1 acre (0.40 ha)
- Built: 1901
- Architectural style: Mission/spanish Revival
- NRHP reference No.: 77000236
- Added to NRHP: August 3, 1977

The Dell Potter Ranch House, in Greenlee County, Arizona near Clifton, Arizona, was built in 1901. It was listed on the National Register of Historic Places in 1977.

The property was homesteaded by Delbert Maxwell Potter, who married Elizabeth Dorsey Potter. Potter was "a wealthy miner". The house was abandoned after a flood in 1983 and was vandalized during the next six years. A granddaughter, June Lorraine Potter Palmer, who was "an acclaimed artist", purchased the property in 1989, "restored the home to its original Victorian décor", and operated it as an inn. June had been born in 1922 on the ranch and grew up with summers on the ranch and school years in town in Clifton. She lived out the last 30 years of her life there, after purchasing the property in 1989.

It is Mission/Spanish Revival in style. The house was under threat of fire in 2017, when firefighters stopped a blaze only 150 yards (140 m) away.

It went up for sale in 2018.

The three-bedroom 2,192 square feet (203.6 m^{2}) house on 44.7 acres (18.1 ha) ("a beautiful natural setting") was listed for sale at $185,000, with warnings about flood danger.

It is located north of Clifton, off San Francisco River Road, on the San Francisco River side of the road.
