= Ryan Broyles =

American football player (born 1988)

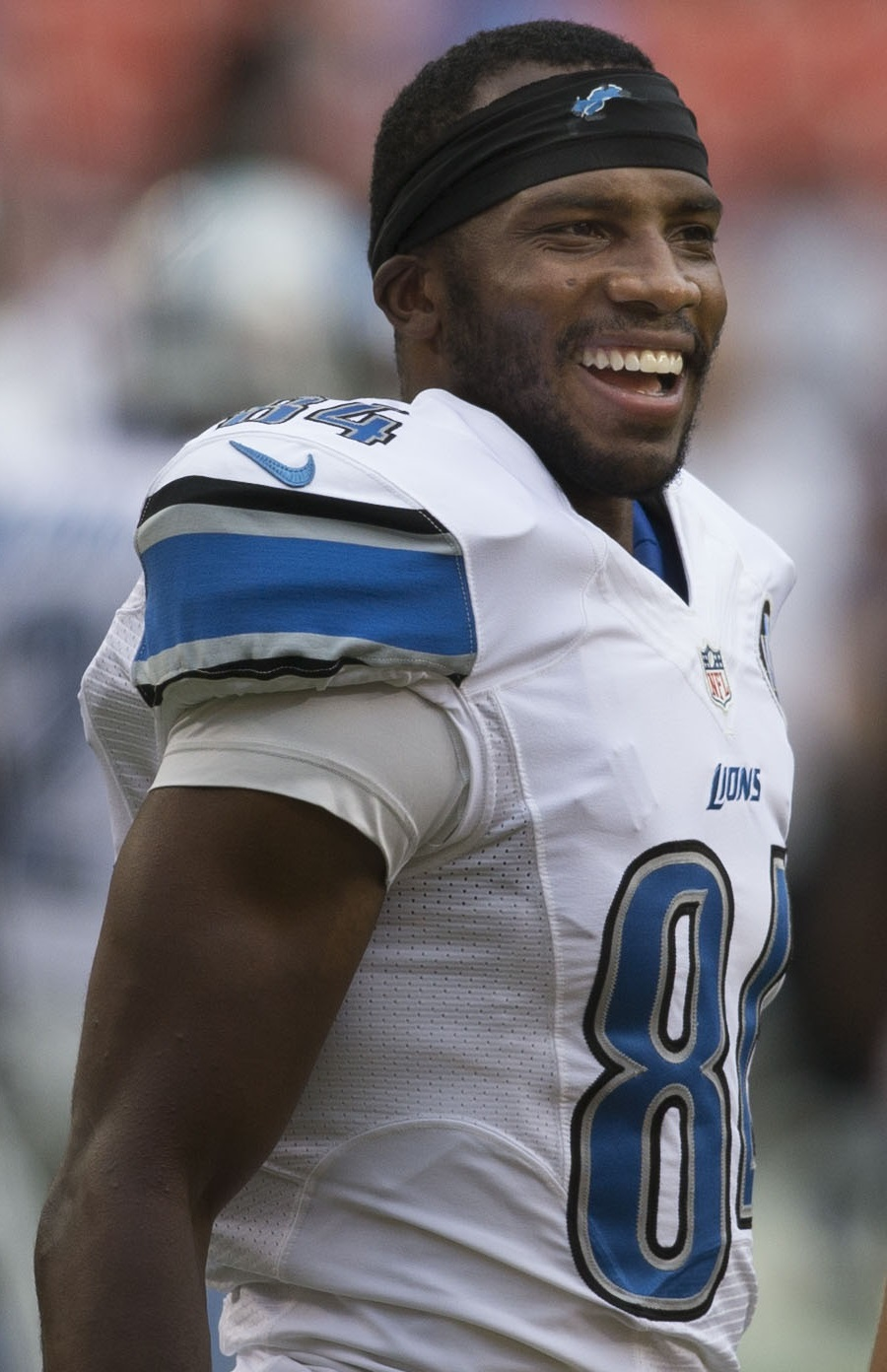
- Broyles with the Detroit Lions in 2015

No. 84
- Position: Wide receiver

Personal information
- Born: April 9, 1988 (age 38); Oklahoma City, Oklahoma, U.S.
- Listed height: 5 ft 10 in (1.78 m)
- Listed weight: 195 lb (88 kg)

Career information
- High school: Norman (Norman, Oklahoma)
- College: Oklahoma (2007–2011)
- NFL draft: 2012: 2nd round, 54th overall pick

Career history
- Detroit Lions (2012–2014); Arlington Renegades (2020)*
- * Offseason or practice squad member only

Awards and highlights
- 2× Consensus All-American (2010, 2011); First-team All-Big 12 (2010, 2011); Second-team All-Big 12 (2009)

Career NFL statistics
- Receptions: 32
- Receiving yards: 420
- Receiving touchdowns: 2
- Stats at Pro Football Reference

Ryan Broyles (born April 9, 1988) is an American former professional football player who was a wide receiver for the Detroit Lions of the National Football League (NFL). He played college football for the Oklahoma Sooners. He set the all-time NCAA Football Bowl Subdivision record for career receptions, and was twice recognized as a consensus All-American. Broyles was selected by Detroit in the second round of the 2012 NFL draft. He joined the Dallas Renegades of the XFL in 2019, but retired before playing for the team.

== Early life ==
Broyles was born in Oklahoma City, Oklahoma. He attended Norman High School, where he was a three-sport star in football, basketball and track. He played as a wide receiver and defensive back for the Norman Tigers high school football team. He finished his career with 79 receptions for 1,688 yards and 18 touchdowns on offense and 157 tackles and 20 interceptions on defense. He was named 6A-2 All-District and OCA All-State. In basketball, he averaged 18 points per game.

Also a standout track & field athlete, Broyles was one of the state's top performers in the high jump. At the 2006 Mid-State Conference Meet, he tied for first place in the high jump, posting a career-best mark of 2.10 meters (6 ft, 10 in). He also ran on the Norman 4 × 100 m relay squad.

== College career ==
Broyles attended the University of Oklahoma, where he played for coach Bob Stoops's Oklahoma Sooners football team from 2008 to 2011. He was redshirted in 2007 after being arrested for attempting to steal gasoline from a closed down gas station. In his first collegiate game against Cincinnati in 2008, Broyles had seven receptions for a school freshman record of 141 yards. He finished the season tying a school freshman record with 46 receptions. His 687 yards were also a Sooners freshman record. He also had six receiving touchdowns and 30 punt returns for 238 yards and a touchdown.

In the 2009 season, Broyles caught 76 passes for 964 yards and 12 touchdowns. He had 13 catches for 156 yards and three touchdowns in Oklahoma's 31–27 Sun Bowl victory over Stanford University. For his outstanding performance, Broyles was named Sun Bowl MVP.

In 2010, he caught 131 passes for 1,622 yards and 14 touchdowns. In Oklahoma's 48–20 Fiesta Bowl victory over the University of Connecticut, he had 13 catches for 170 yards and a touchdown.

On October 15, 2011, Broyles broke the all-time FBS career reception record (previously held by Taylor Stubblefield of Purdue) with his 317th career catch versus Kansas. The record was later broken by Justin Hardy in 2014. Broyles's college career ended in a game against Texas A&M on November 5, 2011, when he tore the anterior cruciate ligament in his left knee. His senior season ended with 83 receptions for 1,157 yards and 10 touchdowns in nine games.

Broyles finished his career with 349 receptions for 4,586 yards and 45 touchdowns.

=== College statistics ===
Year	Team	GP	Receiving		
Year	Team	GP	Rec	Yards	TDs
2008	Oklahoma	13	46	687	6
2009	Oklahoma	12	89	1,120	15
2010	Oklahoma	14	131	1,622	14
2011	Oklahoma	9	83	1,157	10
College totals		48	349	4,586	45

== Professional career ==
Pre-draft measurables
Height	Weight	Arm length	Hand span	Wingspan	Bench press
5 ft 10 1/8 in (1.78 m)	192 lb (87 kg)	30 1/4 in (0.77 m)	9 in (0.23 m)	6 ft 0 5/8 in (1.84 m)	21 reps
All values from NFL Combine

The Detroit Lions selected him in the second round (54th overall pick) of the 2012 NFL draft. He recorded his first NFL touchdown reception in the 4th quarter of Week 7, a 13–7 loss to the Chicago Bears. On November 16, Broyles was fined $10,000 for an illegal crack-block against the Minnesota Vikings in Week 10. He was named the 2012 Detroit Lions Rookie of the Year by the Detroit Sports Broadcasters Association. On August 31, 2015, he was released by the Lions per his request, days after barely appearing in a preseason game against Jacksonville.

On October 16, 2019, Broyles was selected by the Dallas Renegades during the fifth round of open phase in the 2020 XFL draft. The Renegades were led by head coach Bob Stoops, who was formerly Broyles' head coach at Oklahoma. Broyles did not play a down for the team as he announced his retirement on December 5, 2019.

== Personal life ==
He is the son of Stephanie Moore and Anthony Broyles.

In 2007, he was arrested and charged with attempted larceny for trying to steal gas in Norman. Norman police arrested him at Mr. Shortstop, a local gas station, when they found him with a fuel-pump key and a pump-override code. The misdemeanor landed him a six-month deferred sentence and a $100 fine.

He graduated from Norman High School and the University of Oklahoma.

"In Spring 2011 nearly two dozen OU athletes traveled to Haiti and volunteered at the Mission of Hope. In a country that has long been the poorest in the Western Hemisphere and is still reeling from the effects of a massive earthquake more than a year and a half ago, Broyles witnessed poverty unlike anything he'd ever seen. People with no roofs over their heads. People with no running water, no electricity, no modern convenience of any kind.

Everywhere he looked, he saw people with nothing — nothing but their faith. In that stripped-down, laid-bare world, people found joy in their faith. They smiled. They laughed. They celebrated. 'I was jealous, I wanted to be like that', Broyles said.;

After the mission trip to Haiti he became a more devout Christian. Broyles proposed to his high school and Oklahoma college girlfriend Mary Beth Offenburger. They married July 7, 2012. In June 2015 their son Sebastian Reid Broyles was born. The family lives in a house built by Ryan in Dallas, Texas.

Following his time with the Lions, Broyles has worked as a real estate developer in the Norman, Oklahoma area.

== See also ==
- List of NCAA major college football yearly receiving leaders
- List of NCAA Division I FBS career receiving touchdowns leaders
