= Ryan Yarborough =

American football player (born 1971)

No. 87, 80
- Position: Wide receiver

Personal information
- Born: April 26, 1971 (age 55); Baltimore, Maryland, U.S.
- Listed height: 6 ft 2 in (1.88 m)
- Listed weight: 195 lb (88 kg)

Career information
- High school: Rich East (Park Forest, Illinois)
- College: Wyoming (1990–1993)
- NFL draft: 1994: 2nd round, 41st overall pick

Career history
- New York Jets (1994–1995); Green Bay Packers (1996–1997)*; Baltimore Ravens (1997–1998); New Orleans Saints (1999)*; Chicago Enforcers (2000)
- * Offseason or practice squad member only

Awards and highlights
- 2× First-team All-American (1992, 1993); First-team All-WAC (1993)

Career NFL statistics
- Receptions: 44
- Receiving yards: 494
- Receiving touchdowns: 3
- Stats at Pro Football Reference
- College Football Hall of Fame

Ryan Kenneth Yarborough (born April 26, 1971) is an American former professional football player who was a wide receiver in the National Football League (NFL). He was selected by the New York Jets in the second round (41st overall) of the 1994 NFL draft. Yarbourough played college football for the Wyoming Cowboys and was one of the most prolific receivers in college football history. He was inducted into the College Football Hall of Fame in 2025.

A two-time first-team All-American, he held the NCAA record for career games with a touchdown reception with 27—since broken by Jarett Dillard. He finished his career at Wyoming with 229 receptions for 4,357 yards and 42 touchdowns.

Yarborough's success at the college level did not carry on to the NFL. His NFL career lasted only a few years with the Jets and Baltimore Ravens. He also saw action in 2001 for the XFL's Chicago Enforcers.

== See also ==
- List of NCAA major college football yearly receiving leaders
- List of NCAA Division I FBS career receiving touchdowns leaders
