= MuslimVillage Forums =

Australian internet forum

MuslimVillage Forums is an Internet forum and a section of MuslimVillage.com (formerly IslamicSydney.com) that was founded in 2001. As of 6:25pm [NSW EST] Tuesday 15 May 2012 - there are 15,666 total registered members with a total of 935,832 forum posts being made.

In 2005, IslamicSydney.com was chosen to be archived with the National Library of Australia, and in 2006, was the winner of the Mission of Hope Annual Muslim achievement awards under the category of 'Media Outlet of the Year'.

== Uses ==
The Australian Muslim community has used the MuslimVillage forums to discuss news stories involving Muslims. They have also posted their reactions to the stories, in support or in opposition of the persons involved and the portrayal of Muslims by the press.
