= Zay Jones =

American football player (born 1995)

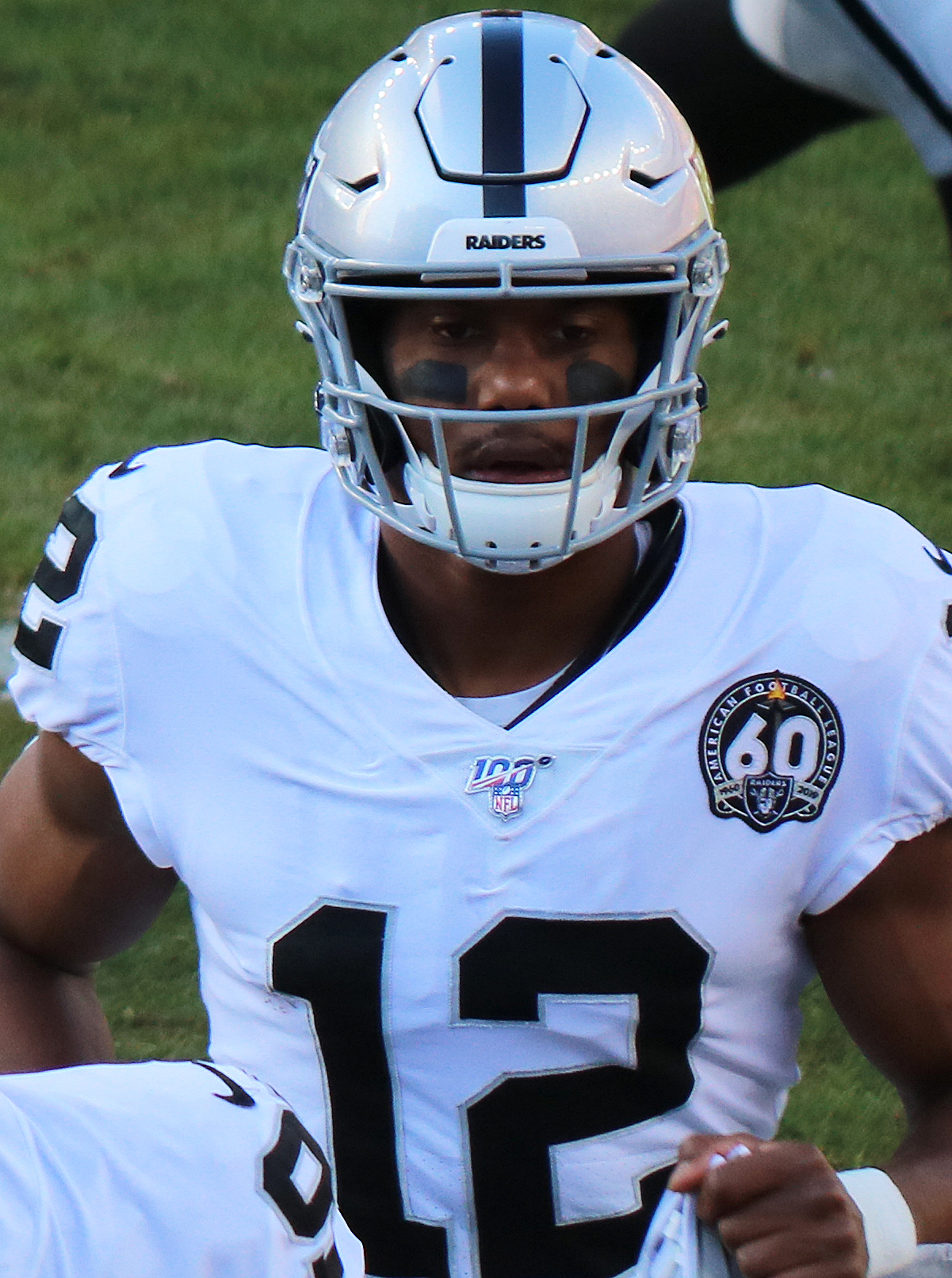
- Jones with the Oakland Raiders in 2019

No. 7 – Arizona Cardinals
- Position: Wide receiver
- Roster status: Practice squad

Personal information
- Born: March 30, 1995 (age 31); Dallas, Texas, U.S.
- Listed height: 6 ft 2 in (1.88 m)
- Listed weight: 200 lb (91 kg)

Career information
- High school: Stephen F. Austin (Austin, Texas)
- College: East Carolina (2013–2016)
- NFL draft: 2017: 2nd round, 37th overall pick

Career history
- Buffalo Bills (2017–2019); Oakland / Las Vegas Raiders (2019–2021); Jacksonville Jaguars (2022–2023); Arizona Cardinals (2024–2025); Houston Texans (2026)*; Arizona Cardinals (2026–present)
- * Offseason or practice squad member only

Awards and highlights
- First-team All-American (2016); NCAA receptions leader (2016); First-team All-AAC (2016); NCAA (FBS) records: Career receptions: 399; Receptions in a season: 158 (2016)

Career NFL statistics as of 2025
- Receptions: 307
- Receiving yards: 3,295
- Receiving touchdowns: 18
- Stats at Pro Football Reference

Isaiah Avery "Zay" Jones (born March 30, 1995) is an American professional football wide receiver for the Arizona Cardinals of the National Football League (NFL). He played college football for the East Carolina Pirates. Jones is the all-time NCAA Division I career receptions leader with 399 as well as the all-time NCAA Division I single-season receptions leader with 158.

== Early life ==
Jones was born on March 30, 1995, in Dallas, Texas, the son of Robert Jones, a former football player who spent ten years in the NFL, and Maneesha Jones. He has two brothers, Cayleb and Levi, and his uncle is Jeff Blake. Jones attended Stephen F. Austin High School in Austin, Texas. He committed to East Carolina University to play college football.

== College career ==
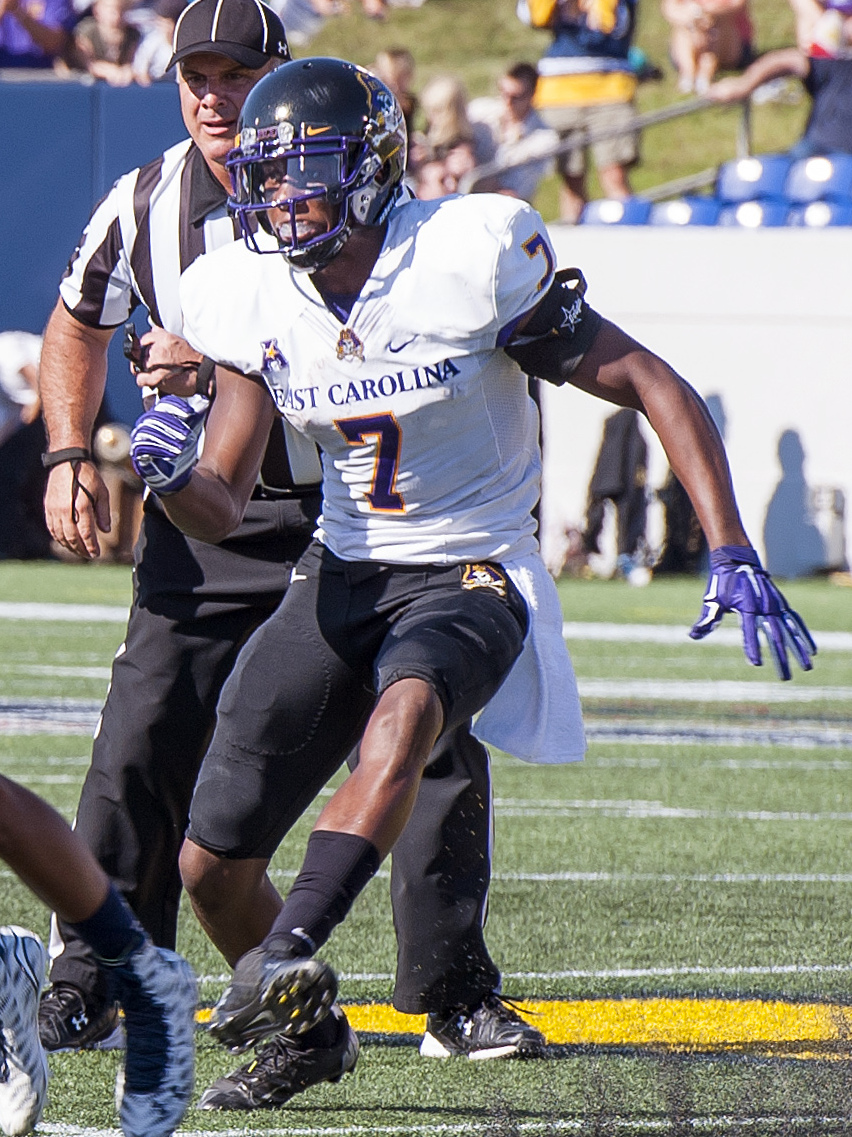
Jones with East Carolina in 2015

Jones played in 13 games and made eight starts as a true freshman at East Carolina in 2013. He finished second on the team with 62 receptions for 604 yards and five touchdowns. As a sophomore, he had 81 receptions for 830 yards and five touchdowns. As a junior, he recorded 98 receptions for 1,099 yards and five touchdowns. During his senior season in 2016, he set a school record for receptions in a game with 22, breaking the previous record of 17 held by Justin Hardy and then went on to break the school record for receptions in a season, also held by Hardy, nine games into the season. Subsequently, Jones became the NCAA Division I football all-time single season leader in receptions with 158 for the 2016 season, breaking the previous record of 155 set by wide receiver Freddie Barnes of Bowling Green in 2009. Additionally, Jones became the NCAA Division I football career leader in receptions with 399, breaking the all-time NCAA record of 387 held by his former ECU Pirate teammate and future NFL receiver Justin Hardy. Jones was also named as one of three finalists for the 2016 Biletnikoff Award, which is given annually to the nation's outstanding receiver in college football.

== Professional career ==
=== Pre-draft ===
Jones received an invitation to the Senior Bowl and had practiced well during the week leading up to the game. He led both teams and greatly improved his draft stock after making six receptions for 68 receiving yards and a touchdown for the North, who lost 16–15 to the South. He also attended the NFL Combine and completed all the combine and positional drills. Jones also participated at East Carolina's Pro Day, but opted to only run positional drills for team representatives and scouts. The majority of NFL draft experts and analysts projected Jones to be selected in the second round. He was ranked the fourth best wide receiver in the draft by NFL media analyst Mike Mayock, the fifth best wide receiver by ESPN, and was ranked the sixth best wide receiver by Sports Illustrated and NFLDraftScout.com.

Pre-draft measurables
| Height | Weight | Arm length | Hand span | Wingspan | 40-yard dash | 10-yard split | 20-yard split | 20-yard shuttle | Three-cone drill | Vertical jump | Broad jump | Bench press |
|---|---|---|---|---|---|---|---|---|---|---|---|---|
| 6 ft 2 1/8 in (1.88 m) | 201 lb (91 kg) | 32 1/2 in (0.83 m) | 9 in (0.23 m) | 6 ft 5 3/4 in (1.97 m) | 4.45 s | 1.55 s | 2.61 s | 4.01 s | 6.79 s | 36.5 in (0.93 m) | 11 ft 1 in (3.38 m) | 15 reps |
All values from NFL Combine

=== Buffalo Bills ===
==== 2017 ====
The Buffalo Bills selected Jones in the second round with the 37th overall pick in the 2017 NFL draft. On May 18, the Bills signed Jones to a four-year, $6.77 million contract with $3.84 million guaranteed and a signing bonus of $3.07 million.

On September 10, 2017, Jones made his NFL debut. He had one reception for 21 yards in the 21–12 victory over the New York Jets. On September 17, 2017, in Week 2, he barely missed on a potential game-winning pass from quarterback Tyrod Taylor on fourth down late in the game of a 9–3 loss to the Carolina Panthers. In Week 9, against the New York Jets, he recorded six receptions for 53 yards and his first career receiving touchdown. In 15 games (10 starts) of his rookie year in 2017, Jones finished with 316 receiving yards and two touchdowns.

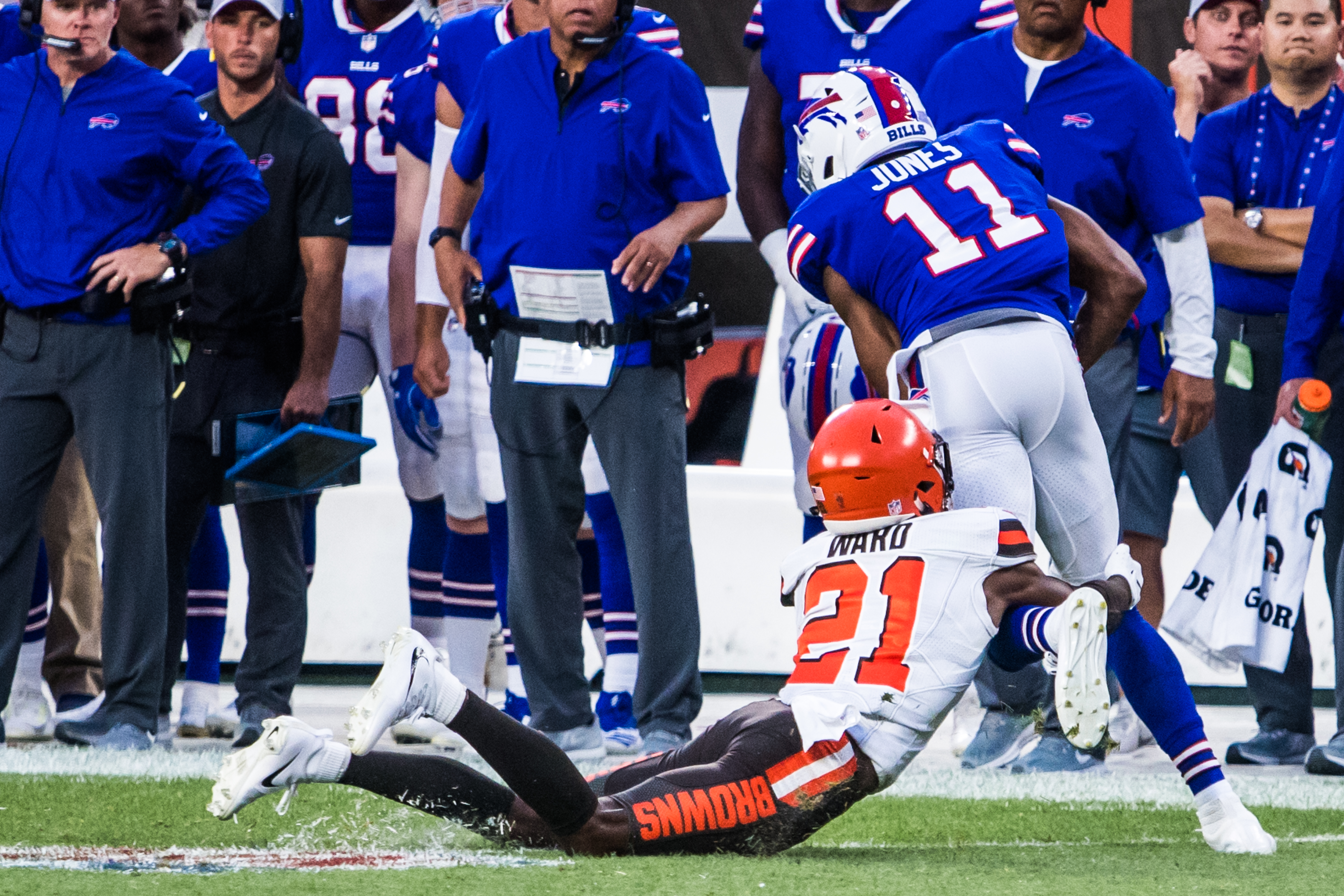
Jones during the 2018 preseason

==== 2018 ====
Following his rookie season, Jones revealed he had played much of the year with a torn labrum in the shoulder, which required offseason surgery. Jones missed much of OTA's during the 2018 offseason due to another injury stemming from an offseason incident and started training camp on the non-football injury list.

Jones showed improvement early in the season as his catch percentage rose significantly from his rookie season despite a low-volume passing offense. He caught a 57-yard pass from rookie quarterback Josh Allen in Week 2 against the Los Angeles Chargers that was his new personal record for his longest reception. The pass traveled 63.8 yards in the air, which was also the second longest air distance for a completed pass ever recorded by NFL NextGen Stats since its inception. Jones recorded his first touchdown of the season against the Houston Texans, a 16-yard pass from Nathan Peterman (who entered the game after Allen was injured), that briefly gave the Bills the lead.

Against the Jets in Week 10, Jones caught another touchdown to go with 93 receiving yards, a new career high. He recorded his first game with multiple receiving touchdowns two games later, catching two scores in a 21–17 loss to the Miami Dolphins in Week 13.

Jones finished the 2018 season as Buffalo's leading receiver. He caught 56 receptions for 652 yards and seven touchdowns.

=== Oakland / Las Vegas Raiders ===
On October 7, 2019, Jones was traded to the Oakland Raiders for a 2021 fifth-round pick. In the 2019 season, he appeared in 15 games and started nine. He finished with 27 receptions for 216 receiving yards.

During the Raiders' first home game in Allegiant Stadium upon relocating to Las Vegas in 2020, Jones caught his first touchdown since 2018 in a 34–24 Raiders win over the New Orleans Saints. Jones was fined US$15,000 by the NFL on October 5, 2020, for attending a maskless charity event hosted by teammate Darren Waller during the COVID-19 pandemic in violation of the NFL's COVID-19 protocols for the 2020 season. Jones appeared in 16 games, of which he started two, in the 2020 season. He finished with 14 receptions for 154 receiving yards and one receiving touchdown.

On March 19, 2021, Jones re-signed with the Raiders on a one-year contract. Against the Baltimore Ravens in Week 1, Jones recorded a 31-yard touchdown to end the game as the Raiders won 33–27 in overtime. He played in all 17 games, of which he started nine. He finished with 47 receptions for 546 receiving yards and one receiving touchdown.

=== Jacksonville Jaguars ===
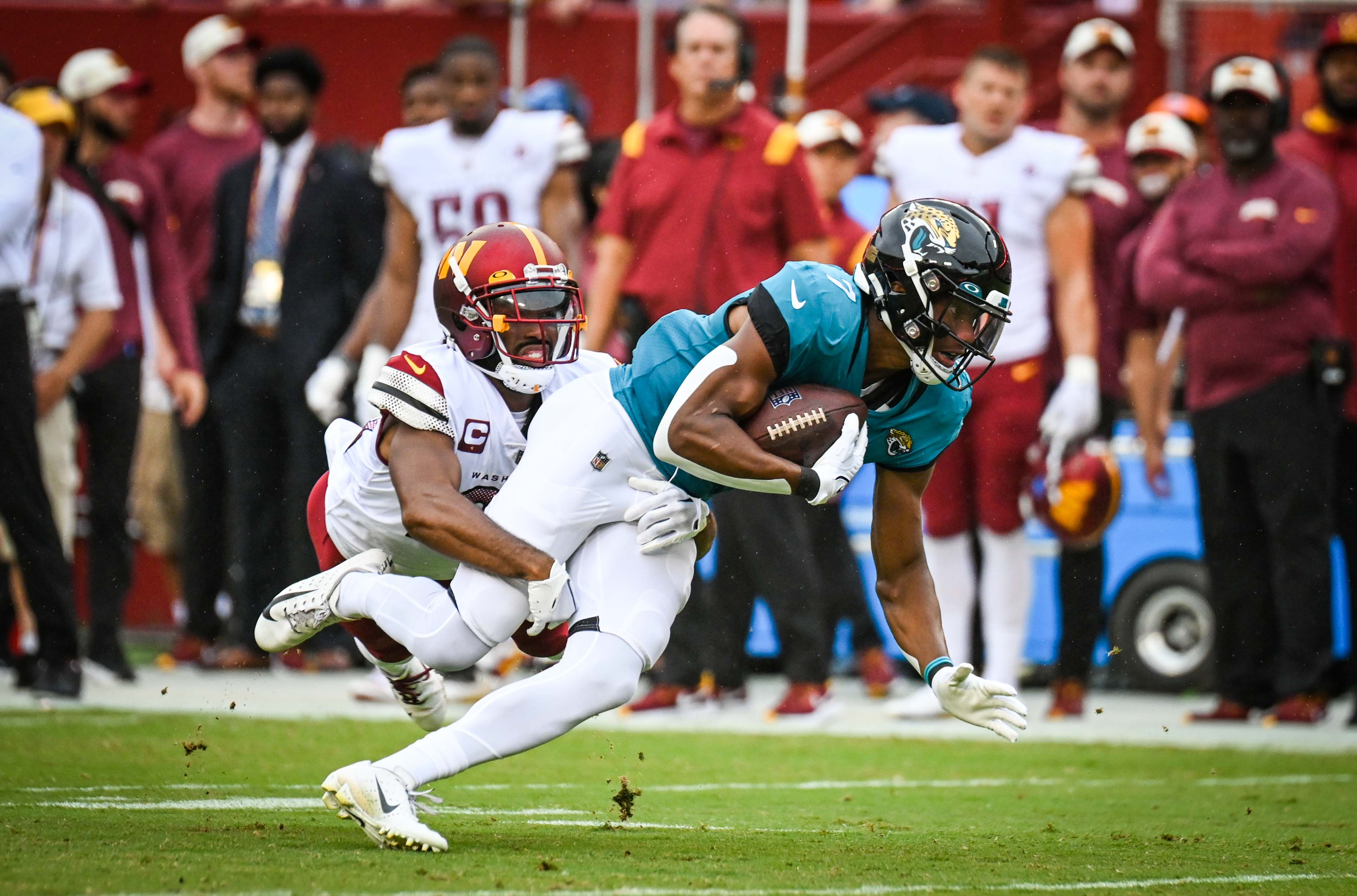
Jones playing against the Washington Commanders in 2022.

On March 16, 2022, Jones signed a three-year, $24 million contract with the Jacksonville Jaguars. In Week 15 against the Dallas Cowboys, Jones recorded 109 receiving yards and three touchdowns in the 40–34 victory. In the 2022 season, Jones appeared in 16 games and recorded 82 receptions for 823 receiving yards and five receiving touchdowns. In the Wild Card Round against the Chargers, he had eight receptions for 74 receiving yards and one touchdown in the 31–30 victory.

In the 2023 season, Jones appeared in nine games and started seven. He finished with 34 receptions for 321 yards and two touchdowns.

On April 30, 2024, Jones was released by the Jaguars.

=== Arizona Cardinals (first stint) ===
On May 13, 2024, Jones signed a one-year contract with the Arizona Cardinals. On August 23, Jones was suspended five games for violating NFL's personal conduct policy. He appeared in 11 games and had eight receptions for 84 yards.

On March 11, 2025, Jones re-signed with the Cardinals on a one-year, $4.4 million contract. In eight appearances for the team, he recorded 12 receptions for 183 yards. On November 10, it was announced that Jones suffered a season-ending torn Achilles in Week 10 against the Seattle Seahawks. On November 12, he was placed on injured reserve.

=== Houston Texans ===
On August 22, 2026, Jones signed with the Houston Texans. He was released by the Texans as a part of final roster cuts on August 30.

=== Arizona Cardinals (second stint) ===
On October 27, 2026, Jones signed with the Arizona Cardinals' practice squad.

== Career statistics ==
Legend
| **Bold** | Career high |

=== NFL ===
==== Regular season ====
| Year | Team | Games | | Receiving | | | | | Fumbles | |
| Year | Team | GP | GS | Rec | Yds | Avg | Lng | TD | Fum | Lost |
|---|---|---|---|---|---|---|---|---|---|---|
| 2017 | BUF | 15 | 10 | 27 | 316 | **11.7** | 33 | 2 | 0 | 0 |
| 2018 | BUF | 16 | 15 | 56 | 652 | 11.6 | 57 | **7** | **1** | 0 |
| 2019 | BUF | 5 | 2 | 7 | 69 | 9.9 | 23 | 0 | 0 | 0 |
| 2019 | OAK | 10 | 7 | 20 | 147 | 7.4 | 16 | 0 | 0 | 0 |
| 2020 | LV | 16 | 2 | 14 | 154 | 11.0 | 37 | 1 | 0 | 0 |
| 2021 | LV | 17 | 9 | 47 | 546 | 11.6 | 43 | 1 | **1** | **1** |
| 2022 | JAX | 16 | 15 | **82** | **823** | 10.0 | **59** | 5 | 0 | 0 |
| 2023 | JAX | 9 | 7 | 34 | 321 | 9.4 | 36 | 2 | 0 | 0 |
| 2024 | ARI | 11 | 2 | 8 | 84 | 10.5 | 25 | 0 | 0 | 0 |
| 2025 | ARI | 8 | 0 | 12 | 183 | 15.3 | 43 | 0 | 0 | 0 |
| Career | | 123 | 69 | 307 | 3,295 | 10.7 | 59 | 18 | 2 | 1 |

==== Postseason ====
| Year | Team | Games | | Receiving | | | | | Fumbles | |
| Year | Team | GP | GS | Rec | Yds | Avg | Lng | TD | Fum | Lost |
|---|---|---|---|---|---|---|---|---|---|---|
| 2017 | BUF | 1 | 0 | 2 | 20 | 10.0 | 15 | 0 | 0 | 0 |
| 2021 | LV | 1 | 1 | 5 | 61 | **12.2** | 17 | **1** | 0 | 0 |
| 2022 | JAX | 2 | 2 | **13** | **157** | 12.1 | **39** | **1** | 0 | 0 |
| Career | | 4 | 3 | 20 | 238 | 11.9 | 39 | 2 | 0 | 0 |

=== College ===
Legend
| NCAA record |

| Season | Team | GP | Rec | Yds | TD |
|---|---|---|---|---|---|
| 2013 | East Carolina | 12 | 62 | 604 | 5 |
| 2014 | East Carolina | 13 | 81 | 830 | 5 |
| 2015 | East Carolina | 12 | 98 | 1,099 | 5 |
| 2016 | East Carolina | 12 | **158** | **1,746** | **8** |
| Total | | 49 | 399 | 4,279 | 23 |
