= Jarett Dillard =

American football player and lawyer (born 1985)

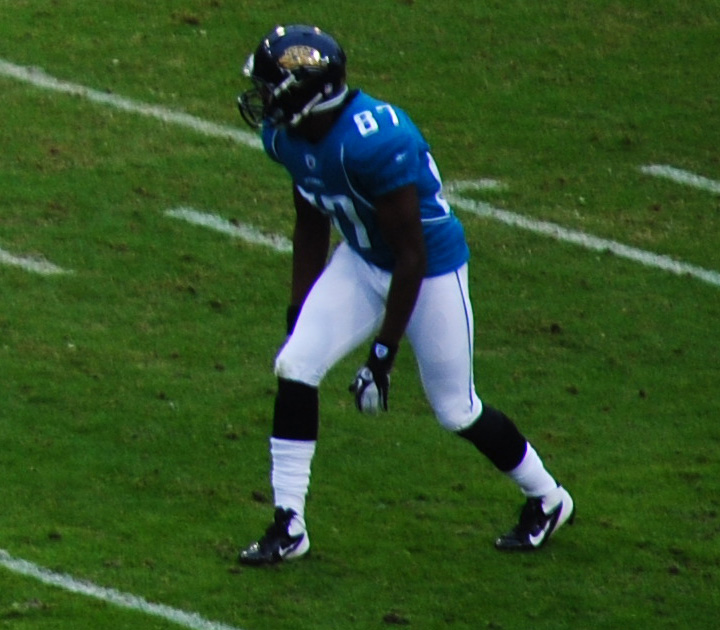
- Dillard with the Jacksonville Jaguars in 2011

No. 87
- Position: Wide receiver

Personal information
- Born: December 21, 1985 (age 40); San Antonio, Texas, U.S.
- Listed height: 5 ft 10 in (1.78 m)
- Listed weight: 187 lb (85 kg)

Career information
- High school: Sam Houston (San Antonio)
- College: Rice (2005–2008)
- NFL draft: 2009: 5th round, 144th overall pick

Career history
- Jacksonville Jaguars (2009−2011); Detroit Lions (2012)*; Arizona Cardinals (2013)*
- * Offseason or practice squad member only

Awards and highlights
- First-team All-American (2008); Second-team All-American (2006); 2× NCAA receiving touchdowns leader (2006, 2008); 3× First-team All-C-USA (2006–2008); NCAA (FBS) record: Career receiving touchdowns: 60

Career NFL statistics
- Receptions: 35
- Receiving yards: 398
- Receiving average: 11.4
- Receiving touchdowns: 1
- Stats at Pro Football Reference

Jarett Juma Porter Dillard (born December 21, 1985) is an American former professional football player who was a wide receiver for the Jacksonville Jaguars of the National Football League (NFL). Dillard played college football player for the Rice Owls, earning first-team All-American honors in 2008. He was selected by Jacksonville in the fifth round of the 2009 NFL draft.

Following his NFL career, Dillard embarked on a successful legal career. He attended the South Texas College of Law, attaining his Doctor of Jurisprudence (J.D.) degree. Dillard practices law in the State of Texas.

== Early life ==
Dillard was born and raised in San Antonio, Texas, the son of Porter and Robin Dillard. He has two siblings. Jarett was a valedictorian and Tai was a salutatorian at Sam Houston High School. Darik ranked third in his class at MacArthur High School. Tai played in the Women's National Basketball Association (WNBA), where she played for the San Antonio Stars. Tai also played basketball for The University of Texas at Austin, while earning her Bachelor of Science in Kinesiology. Presently Tai is Assistant coach of the University of Houston's women's basketball team. Brother Darik played football for Rice University, while earning his Bachelor of Science in mechanical engineering.

== College career ==
As a redshirt sophomore in 2006, he helped lead Rice to its first bowl game in 45 years (1961 Bluebonnet Bowl). Rice closed the season on a 7–1 run, capped by a come-from-behind victory over SMU to clinch a bowl game. During those eight games, Dillard caught 55 passes for 826 yards and 16 touchdowns. That season, he led the NCAA in receiving touchdowns and earned multiple national honors, including being a finalist for the Biletnikoff Award, a first-team All-C-USA selection, a first-team All-American by ESPN, and a second-team All-American by Sports Illustrated, the Walter Camp Football Foundation, Sporting News, and the Associated Press.

At one point Dillard had a streak of 15 straight games in which he had caught a touchdown pass, leaving only Larry Fitzgerald, who had 18 in a row, in front of him. In the New Orleans Bowl, Dillard caught a touchdown pass in the fourth quarter to set a new record for games with a touchdown in a single season (13), besting the mark he shared with Fitzgerald and Randy Moss of 12 games in a season. In 2006, he caught a total of 21 touchdown passes, which set both Rice and C-USA records. On four separate occasions (Army, UAB, Tulsa, and SMU) he caught three touchdown passes in the same game. He also accumulated 91 catches for 1,247 yards, including seven games with at least 90 yards: UCLA (102), Texas (91), Florida St. (113), Army (171), UAB (111), Tulsa (137), and SMU (145).

In 2007, Dillard caught another 14 TD passes, earning first-team All-C-USA honors and being mentioned by several publications as an All-American honorable mention (including a fourth-team selection by Sports Illustrated). Dillard is one of only eight players to catch 40 TD passes in a career, a feat he accomplished when he was only a junior.

As a senior in 2008, Dillard caught an NCAA-leading 20 receiving touchdowns. He was named first-team All-American by the Football Writers Association of America and second-team All-American by the Walter Camp Football Foundation and Associated Press. He was also named first-team All-C-USA for a third consecutive season.

Dillard holds the NCAA record for career touchdown receptions with 60, eclipsing the prior mark of 50 set by Troy Edwards.

Dillard and Rice quarterback Chase Clement hold the NCAA Division I-A record for career touchdowns between a quarterback-receiver tandem with 51, which has since been tied by Zach Terrell and Corey Davis of Western Michigan. This total does not include the touchdown pass thrown by Dillard to Clement during the final game for both Rice Seniors in the 2008 Texas Bowl. After his senior year, he became the first Rice player to be named to the Football Writers All America team in 50 years (Buddy Dial in 1958).

=== Awards and honors ===
- Biletnikoff Award Finalist (2006)
- New Orleans Bowl (2006)
- Texas Bowl (2008)
- Football Writers Association of America All-American (2008)
- Sports Illustrated All-American (2006, 2008)
- Walter Camp All-American (2006, 2008)
- AP All-American (2008)
- Sporting News All-American (2008)
- ESPN All-American (2008)
- East–West Shrine Game (2009)
- Ed Block Courage Award (2011)
- Rice Athletic Hall of Fame (2015)

== Professional career ==
Pre-draft measurables
Height	Weight	Arm length	Hand span	40-yard dash	10-yard split	20-yard split	20-yard shuttle	Three-cone drill	Vertical jump	Broad jump	Bench press
5 ft 10 1/4 in (1.78 m)	191 lb (87 kg)	32 in (0.81 m)	8 1/2 in (0.22 m)	4.50 s	1.50 s	2.58 s	4.41 s	7.10 s	42.5 in (1.08 m)	10 ft 11 in (3.33 m)	13 reps

=== Jacksonville Jaguars ===
Dillard was selected by the Jacksonville Jaguars in the fifth round of the 2009 NFL draft. He is the second Rice player to be taken by Jacksonville after Brandon Green in 2003. On July 17 he was signed to a contract. Length and terms of the contract were undisclosed. As a rookie, Dillard caught six passes for 106 yards before suffering a broken ankle against the Jets in week 10 of the '09 season.

Dillard was placed on the injured reserve list on September 11, 2010, due to a foot injury and did not play a down that year.

Dillard was released by the Jaguars on May 7, 2012.

=== Detroit Lions ===
Dillard signed with Detroit on June 16, 2012, but was released on August 27, 2012.

=== Arizona Cardinals ===
Dillard signed with the Arizona Cardinals on April 24, 2013. He was waived after being given an injury settlement on August 24, 2013.

== See also ==
- List of NCAA major college football yearly receiving leaders
- List of NCAA Division I FBS career receiving touchdowns leaders
