= Aaron Turner (American football) =

American football wide receiver

Pacific Tigers
- Position: Wide receiver

Personal information
- Born: c. 1971
- Listed height: 6 ft 0 in (1.83 m)
- Listed weight: 170 lb (77 kg)

Career information
- High school: Pittsburgh (CA)
- College: Pacific (1989–1992)

Awards and highlights
- NCAA receiving leader (1991)

Aaron Turner (born c. 1971) was an American football wide receiver. He played college football for the Pacific Tigers from 1989 to 1992. He led the Big West Conference and ranked among the leading receivers in major-college football for three consecutive years:

- As a sophomore in 1990, he caught 66 passes fo 1,264 yards, 11 touchdowns and an average of 19.2 yards per reception. His totals ranked second in receiving yards, fifth in receiving touchdowns, and 10th in receptions.
- As a junior in 1991, he caught 92 passes for 1,604 yards, 18 touchdowns, and an average of 17.4 yards per reception. His totals led the NCAA in receiving yards and ranked second nationally in receptions and receiving touchdowns. On October 26, 1991, he set a school record with 16 receptions in a victory over New Mexico State. His 1,661 receiving yards ranked as the third best single season total in NCAA history at the time.
- As a senior in 1992, he caught 79 passes for 1,171 yards, 11 touchdowns and an average of 14.8 yards per catch. His totals ranked fourth nationally in receptions, fifth in receiving yards and receiving touchdowns.

In four years at Pacific, he caught 266 passes for 4,345 yards, 43 touchdowns, and an average of 16.3 yards per catch. At the conclusion of his career, he was the NCAA's all-time career leader in receiving yards, receptions, and receiving touchdowns, and held the NCAA record for most 100-yard receiving games (23).

In 2005, he was hired as the wide receivers coach at Saint Mary's College of California.

Turner was inducted into the University of the Pacific Athletic Hall of Fame in 2007.

== See also ==
- List of NCAA major college football yearly receiving leaders
- NCAA Division I FBS receiving leaders
