= NCAA Division I FBS receiving leaders =

College football statistics

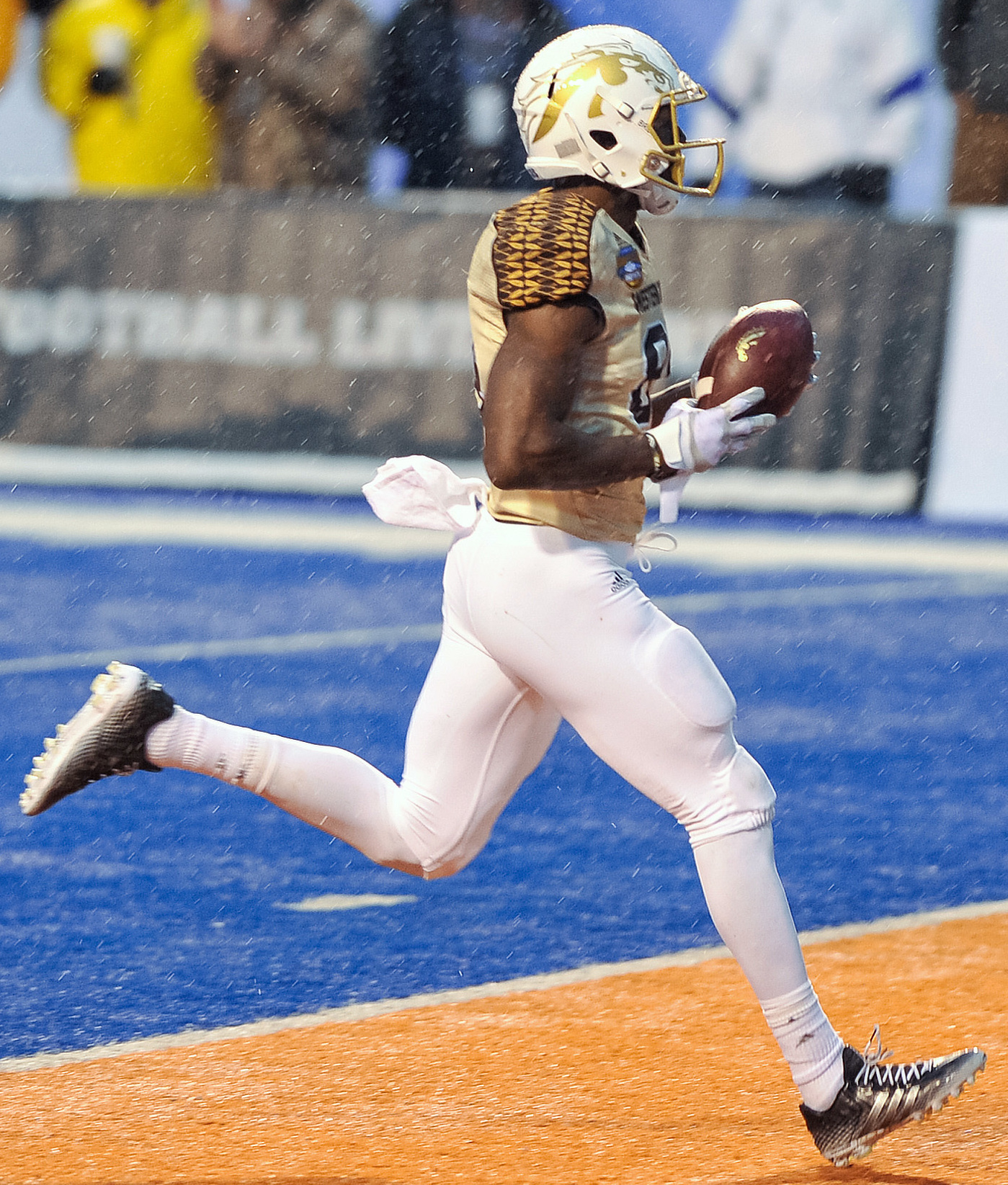
Corey Davis, NCAA FBS all-time leader in career receiving yards.

The NCAA Division I FBS receiving leaders are the career, single-season, and single-game leaders in receiving yards, receiving touchdowns, and receptions. The lists are dominated by more recent players for several reasons:

- Since 1955, the length of the regular season has expanded from 10 games to 11 and later to 12 games, with some programs now playing additional postseason games, including conference championship games, bowl games, and the College Football Playoff.
- The NCAA did not permit freshmen to compete in varsity football until 1972 (with the exception of World War II–era seasons), preventing earlier players from accumulating statistics over four full seasons.
- Bowl games only began counting toward single-season and career statistics in 2002. As a result, many pre-2002 players are underrepresented; for example, Trevor Insley had 98 receiving yards in the 1996 Las Vegas Bowl, which would have brought his career total to 5,103 yards if counted.
- Beginning with the Southeastern Conference in 1992, FBS conferences introduced championship games, which have always counted toward official single-season and career statistics.
- The NCAA ruled that the 2020 season, which was heavily disrupted by the COVID-19 pandemic, would not count against a player’s athletic eligibility, effectively granting an additional year of eligibility to players active that season.
- Since 2018, players have been allowed to participate in as many as four games in a redshirt season; previously, playing in even one game "burned" the redshirt. Since 2024, postseason games have not counted against the four-game limit. These changes to redshirt rules have given very recent players several extra games to accumulate statistics.
- Only statistics accumulated while a player’s team competed in the Football Bowl Subdivision (FBS) are included. For example, only one of Randy Moss’s two seasons at Marshall (1997) counts toward these lists because the program was previously in the FCS.

Legend
Active FBS Player

Statistics are accurate as of the end of the 2025 NCAA Division I FBS football season.

== Receiving yards ==
=== Career ===
The career leader in receiving yards is Corey Davis of Western Michigan. Rather than having a single standout season, Davis accumulated a remarkably consistent four-year total, posting 941, 1,408, 1,429, and 1,500 yards. He broke the previous record held by Trevor Insley of Nevada. Before Insley, the record was held by a pair of Wyoming receivers: Ryan Yarborough and Marcus Harris.

#	Player	Yards	Team
1	Corey Davis	5,285	2013 2014 2015 2016 Western Michigan
2	Trevor Insley	5,005	1996 1997 1998 1999 Nevada
3	Ryan Broyles	4,586	2008 2009 2010 2011 Oklahoma
4	Justin Hardy	4,541	2011 2012 2013 2014 East Carolina
5	Marcus Harris	4,518	1993 1994 1995 1996 Wyoming
6	Patrick Edwards	4,507	2008 2009 2010 2011 Houston
7	Jacob Cowing	4,477	2019 2020 2021 UTEP ᛫ 2022 2023 Arizona
8	James Washington	4,472	2014 2015 2016 2017 Oklahoma State
9	Rashaun Woods	4,414	2000 2001 2002 2003 Oklahoma State
10	Ryan Yarborough	4,357	1990 1991 1992 1993 Wyoming
11	Troy Edwards	4,352	1996 1997 1998 Louisiana Tech
12	Aaron Turner	4,345	1989 1990 1991 1992 Pacific
12	Greg Salas	4,345	2007 2008 2009 2010 Hawaii
14	Zay Jones	4,279	2013 2014 2015 2016 East Carolina
15	Terance Mathis	4,254	1985 1986 1987 1989 New Mexico

#	Player	Yards	Team
16	Geoff Noisy	4,249	1995 1996 1997 1998 Nevada
17	Taywan Taylor	4,234	2013 2014 2015 2016 Western Kentucky
18	Jordan White	4,187	2007 2009 2010 2011 Western Michigan
19	Trent Taylor	4,179	2013 2014 2015 2016 Louisiana Tech
20	Jarett Dillard	4,138	2005 2006 2007 2008 Rice
21	Corey Rucker	4,121	2020 2021 2023 2024 2025 Arkansas State ᛫ 2022 South Carolina
22	Zakhari Franklin	4,038	2019 2020 2021 2022 UTSA ᛫ 2023 Ole Miss ᛫ 2024 Illinois
23	Darius Watts	4,031	2000 2001 2002 2003 Marshall
24	Kendall Wright	4,004	2008 2009 2010 2011 Baylor
25	Troy Walters	3,986	1996 1997 1998 1999 Stanford
26	DeVonta Smith	3,965	2017 2018 2019 2020 Alabama
27	James Proche	3,949	2016 2017 2018 2019 SMU
28	Derek Hagan	3,939	2002 2003 2004 2005 Arizona State
29	Mike Hass	3,924	2002 2003 2004 2005 Oregon State
30	Jason Rivers	3,919	2003 2004 2006 2007 Hawaii

=== Single season ===
Insley holds the single-season record as the only player to ever catch for more than 2,000 yards in a season. He edged out the record set by Troy Edwards the previous season.

#	Player	Yards	Team
1	Trevor Insley	2,006	1999 Nevada
2	Troy Edwards	1,996	1998 Louisiana Tech
3	Michael Crabtree	1,962	2007 Texas Tech
4	Jordan White	1,911	2011 Western Michigan
5	Jerreth Sterns	1,902	2021 Western Kentucky
6	Greg Salas	1,889	2010 Hawaii
7	DeVonta Smith	1,856	2020 Alabama
8	Alex Van Dyke	1,854	1995 Nevada
9	Terrance Williams	1,832	2012 Baylor
10	Trent Taylor	1,803	2016 Louisiana Tech

#	Player	Yards	Team
11	J. R. Tolver	1,785	2002 San Diego State
12	Justin Blackmon	1,782	2010 Oklahoma State
13	Danario Alexander	1,781	2009 Missouri
14	Ja'Marr Chase	1,780	2019 LSU
15	Howard Twilley	1,779	1965 Tulsa
16	Freddie Barnes	1,770	2009 Bowling Green
17	Patrick Edwards	1,752	2011 Houston
18	Rashard Higgins	1,750	2014 Colorado State
19	Zay Jones	1,746	2016 East Carolina
20	Josh Reed	1,740	2001 LSU

#	Player	Yards	Team
21	Brandin Cooks	1,730	2013 Oregon State
21	Taywan Taylor	1,730	2016 Western Kentucky
23	Amari Cooper	1,727	2014 Alabama
24	Marqise Lee	1,724	2012 USC
25	Davante Adams	1,718	2013 Fresno State
26	Ashley Lelie	1,713	2001 Hawaii
27	Troy Edwards	1,707	1997 Louisiana Tech
28	Deven Thompkins	1,704	2021 Utah State
29	Andy Isabella	1,698	2018 UMass
30	Rashaun Woods	1,695	2002 Oklahoma State

=== Single game ===
Edwards holds the single-game record for 405. Of particular note is a 1967 game in which two different Tulsa receivers had over 300 yards.

#	Player	Yards	Date / Team
1	Troy Edwards	405	Aug. 29, 1998 Louisiana Tech
2	Jeremy Gallon	369	Oct. 19, 2013 Michigan
3	Randy Gatewood	363	Sep. 17, 1994 UNLV
4	Chuck Hughes	349	Sep. 18, 1965 Texas Western
5	Jaxon Smith-Njigba	347	Jan. 1, 2022 Ohio State
6	Donnie Avery	346	Oct. 13, 2007 Houston
7	Marqise Lee	345	Oct. 27, 2012 USC
8	Casey Fitzgerald	327	Sep. 8, 2007 North Texas
9	Nate Burleson	326	Nov. 10, 2001 Nevada
9	Carlos Henderson	326	Oct. 15, 2016 Louisiana Tech
11	Rick Eber	322	Oct. 7, 1967 Tulsa
12	Harry Wood	318	Oct. 7, 1967 Tulsa
12	Patrick Edwards	318	Oct. 27, 2011 Houston
14	Jeff Evans	316	Sep. 30, 1978 New Mexico State
15	Alex Van Dyke	314	Nov. 18, 1995 Nevada
15	Terrance Williams	314	Nov. 18, 2012 Baylor

#	Player	Yards	Date / Team
17	Chad Mackey	310	Oct. 16, 1996 Louisiana Tech
17	Corey Rucker	310	Dec. 5, 2020 Arkansas State
19	Jason Rivers	308	Dec. 24, 2006 Hawaii
19	Kayshon Boutte	308	Dec. 19, 2020 LSU
21	Tetairoa McMillan	304	Aug. 31, 2024 Arizona
22	Cobi Hamilton	303	Sep. 22, 2012 Arkansas
22	Stedman Bailey	303	Sep. 29, 2012 West Virginia
22	Andy Isabella	303	Nov. 3, 2018 UMass
25	Chris Daniels	301	Oct. 16, 1999 Purdue
26	Adarius Bowman	300	Oct. 14, 2006 Oklahoma State
27	Brian Oliver	297	Oct. 9, 1993 Ball State
27	Aaron Jones	297	Nov. 11, 2000 Utah State
29	Geoff Noisy	296	Nov. 9, 1996 Nevada
29	J. R. Tolver	296	Sep. 14, 2002 San Diego State
29	James Washington	296	Sep. 17, 2016 Oklahoma State

== Receiving touchdowns ==
=== Career ===
The career leader in receiving touchdowns is Rice's Jarett Dillard, who in 2008 broke a 20-year-old record set by Louisiana Tech's Troy Edwards in 1998. Edwards remains third on the list despite only having played for 3 seasons.

#	Player	TDs	Team
1	Jarett Dillard	60	2005 2006 2007 2008 Rice
2	Corey Davis	52	2013 2014 2015 2016 Western Michigan
3	Troy Edwards	50	1996 1997 1998 Louisiana Tech
4	Darius Watts	47	2000 2001 2002 2003 Marshall
5	DeVonta Smith	46	2017 2018 2019 2020 Alabama
6	Ryan Broyles	45	2008 2009 2010 2011 Oklahoma
7	Aaron Turner	43	1989 1990 1991 1992 Pacific
7	Patrick Edwards	43	2008 2009 2010 2011 Houston
9	Ryan Yarborough	42	1990 1991 1992 1993 Wyoming
9	Rashaun Woods	42	2000 2001 2002 2003 Oklahoma State
9	Zakhari Franklin	42	2019 2020 2021 2022 UTSA ᛫ 2023 Ole Miss ᛫ 2024 Illinois
9	Jeremiah Smith	42	2024 2025 2026 Ohio State
12	Dwayne Jarrett	41	2004 2005 2006 USC
12	Davone Bess	41	2005 2006 2007 Hawaii
12	Michael Crabtree	41	2007 2008 Texas Tech
12	Stedman Bailey	41	2010 2011 2012 West Virginia
12	Taywan Taylor	41	2013 2014 2015 2016 Western Kentucky

#	Player	TDs	Team
17	Justin Blackmon	40	2009 2010 2011 Oklahoma State
18	Braylon Edwards	39	2001 2002 2003 2004 Michigan
18	Greg Jennings	39	2002 2003 2004 2005 Western Michigan
18	Austin Pettis	39	2007 2008 2009 2010 Boise State
18	James Washington	39	2014 2015 2016 2017 Oklahoma State
18	James Proche	39	2016 2017 2018 2019 SMU
23	Clarkston Hines	38	1986 1987 1988 1989 Duke
23	Ryan Yarborough	38	1990 1991 1992 1993 Wyoming
23	Davante Adams	38	2012 2013 Fresno State
23	Jaelon Darden	38	2017 2018 2019 2020 North Texas
27	Michael Floyd	37	2008 2009 2010 2011 Notre Dame
27	Titus Davis	37	2011 2012 2013 2014 Central Michigan
27	Gabe Marks	37	2012 2013 2015 2016 Washington State
27	Anthony Miller	37	2015 2016 2017 Memphis

=== Single season ===
Edwards tops the list of single-season touchdowns with 27.

#	Player	TDs	Team
1	Troy Edwards	27	1998 Louisiana Tech
2	Randy Moss	25	1997 Marshall
2	Stedman Bailey	25	2012 West Virginia
4	Davante Adams	24	2013 Fresno State
5	DeVonta Smith	23	2020 Alabama
6	Manny Hazard	22	1989 Houston
6	Larry Fitzgerald	22	2003 Pittsburgh
6	Michael Crabtree	22	2007 Texas Tech
9	Jarett Dillard	21	2006 Rice
10	Jarett Dillard	20	2008 Rice
10	Justin Blackmon	20	2010 Oklahoma State
10	Patrick Edwards	20	2011 Houston
10	Corey Coleman	20	2015 Baylor
10	Ja'Marr Chase	20	2019 LSU

#	Player	TDs	Team
15	Desmond Howard	19	1991 Michigan
15	Ashley Lelie	19	2001 Hawaii
15	Dez Bryant	19	2008 Oklahoma State
15	Michael Crabtree	19	2008 Texas Tech
15	Freddie Barnes	19	2009 Bowling Green
15	Lyle Leong	19	2010 Texas Tech
15	Corey Davis	19	2016 Western Michigan
15	Carlos Henderson	19	2016 Louisiana Tech
15	Jaelon Darden	19	2020 North Texas

#	Player	TDs	Team
24	Tom Reynolds	18	1971 San Diego State
24	Dennis Smith	18	1989 Utah
24	Aaron Turner	18	1991 Pacific
24	Reidel Anthony	18	1996 Florida
24	Eugene Baker	18	1997 Kent State
24	Darius Watts	18	2001 Marshall
24	Justin Blackmon	18	2011 Oklahoma State
24	DeAndre Hopkins	18	2012 Clemson
24	Anthony Miller	18	2017 Memphis
24	David Sills V	18	2017 West Virginia
24	Justin Jefferson	18	2019 LSU

=== Single game ===
The single-game record is held by Oklahoma State's Rashaun Woods, who caught 7 touchdown passes in a 2003 game against SMU. Many players have had 5 touchdown receptions in the same game.

#	Player	TDs	Date / Team
1	Rashaun Woods	7	Sep. 20, 2003 Oklahoma State
2	Tim Delaney	6	Nov. 15, 1969 San Diego State

== Receptions ==
=== Career ===
The career leader in receptions is East Carolina's Zay Jones, who broke his former teammate Justin Hardy's record in 2016. The first players to catch at least 300 passes in their careers were Purdue's Taylor Stubblefield and Marshall's Josh Davis, both of whom passed 300 catches in 2004.

#	Player	Rec	Team
1	Zay Jones	399	2013 2014 2015 2016 East Carolina
2	Justin Hardy	387	2011 2012 2013 2014 East Carolina
3	Ryan Broyles	349	2008 2009 2010 2011 Oklahoma
4	Corey Davis	332	2013 2014 2015 2016 Western Michigan
5	Trent Taylor	328	2013 2014 2015 2016 Louisiana Tech
6	LaJohntay Wester	326	2020 2021 2022 2023 Florida Atlantic ᛫ 2024 Colorado
7	Tommy Shuler	322	2011 2012 2013 2014 Marshall
8	Zakhari Franklin	321	2019 2020 2021 2022 UTSA ᛫ 2023 Ole Miss ᛫ 2024 Illinois
9	Tyron Carrier	320	2008 2009 2010 2011 Houston
10	Justin Hall	318	2017 2018 2019 2020 2021 Ball State
11	Taylor Stubblefield	316	2001 2002 2003 2004 Purdue
11	Gabe Marks	316	2012 2013 2015 2016 Washington State
11	Jacob Cowing	316	2019 2020 2021 UTEP ᛫ 2022 2023 Arizona
14	Brennan Presley	315	2020 2021 2022 2023 2024 Oklahoma State
15	Joshua Cephus	313	2019 2020 2021 2022 2023 UTSA

#	Player	Rec	Team
16	Tez Johnson	310	2020 2021 2022 Troy ᛫ 2023 2024 Oregon
17	Smoke Harris	307	2018 2019 2020 2021 2022 2023 Louisiana Tech
18	Josh Davis	306	2001 2002 2003 2004 Marshall
18	Jordan White	306	2007 2009 2010 2011 Western Michigan
18	Eric Page	306	2009 2010 2011 Toledo
20	Antonio Brown	305	2007 2008 2009 Central Michigan
22	Taurean Henderson	303	2002 2003 2004 2005 Texas Tech
23	Kendall Wright	302	2008 2009 2010 2011 Baylor
24	James Proche	301	2016 2017 2018 2019 SMU
25	Arnold Jackson	300	1997 1998 1999 2000 Louisville
26	Trevor Insley	298	1996 1997 1998 1999 Nevada
27	Freddie Barnes	297	2006 2007 2008 2009 Bowling Green
28	Geoff Noisy	295	1995 1996 1997 1998 Nevada
29	Nelson Spruce	294	2012 2013 2014 2015 Colorado
30	Rashaun Woods	293	2000 2001 2002 2003 Oklahoma State
30	Davone Bess	293	2005 2006 2007 Hawaii

=== Single season ===
Jones also set the single-season record in 2016, passing Bowling Green's Freddie Barnes, who in 2009 broke a 20-year record held by Houston's Manny Hazard.

#	Player	Rec	Team
1	Zay Jones	158	2016 East Carolina
2	Freddie Barnes	155	2009 Bowling Green
3	Jerreth Sterns	150	2021 Western Kentucky
4	Manny Hazard	142	1989 Houston
5	Troy Edwards	140	1998 Louisiana Tech
5	Jordan White	140	2011 Western Michigan
7	Nate Burleson	138	2002 Nevada
8	Trent Taylor	136	2016 Louisiana Tech
9	Howard Twilley	134	1965 Tulsa
9	Trevor Insley	134	1999 Nevada
9	Michael Crabtree	134	2007 Texas Tech

#	Player	Rec	Team
12	Ryan Broyles	131	2010 Oklahoma
12	Davante Adams	131	2013 Fresno State
14	Alex Van Dyke	129	1995 Nevada
15	J. R. Tolver	128	2002 San Diego State
15	Brandin Cooks	128	2013 Oregon State
17	Eric Page	125	2011 Toledo
18	Amari Cooper	124	2014 Alabama
19	Jordy Nelson	122	2007 Kansas State
20	Justin Blackmon	121	2010 Oklahoma State
20	Justin Hardy	121	2014 East Carolina

#	Player	Rec	Team
22	Greg Salas	119	2010 Hawaii
23	Marqise Lee	118	2012 USC
24	DeVonta Smith	117	2020 Alabama
24	Harold Fannin Jr.	117	2024 Bowling Green
26	Jordan Shipley	116	2009 Texas
27	Mohamed Sanu	115	2011 Rutgers
28	Damond Wilkins	114	1996 Nevada
28	Tavon Austin	114	2012 West Virginia
28	Stedman Bailey	114	2012 West Virginia
28	Justin Hardy	114	2013 East Carolina
28	Trey Quinn	114	2017 SMU
28	Rondale Moore	114	2018 Purdue

=== Single game ===
The single-game record of 23 is shared by UNLV's Randy Gatewood and Eastern Michigan's Tyler Jones. Many players have had 18 receptions in a single game.

#	Player	Rec	Date / Team
1	Randy Gatewood	23	Sep. 17, 1994 UNLV
1	Tyler Jones	23	Nov. 28, 2008 Eastern Michigan
3	Jay Miller	22	Nov. 3, 1973 BYU
3	Freddie Barnes	22	Oct. 10, 2009 Bowling Green
3	Zay Jones	22	Sep. 17, 2016 East Carolina
6	Troy Edwards	21	Aug. 29, 1998 Louisiana Tech
6	Chris Daniels	21	Oct. 16, 1999 Purdue
6	Quinton Patton	21	Oct. 13, 2012 Louisiana Tech
9	Rick Eber	20	Oct. 7, 1967 Tulsa
9	Kenny Christian	20	Sep. 23, 2000 Eastern Michigan
9	Nick Moore	20	Oct. 11, 2008 Toledo
9	Thomas Sperbeck	20	Nov. 14, 2015 Boise State

#	Player	Rec	Date / Team
13	Howard Twilley	19	Nov. 27, 1965 Tulsa
13	Ron Flair	19	Oct. 28, 1989 Arizona State
13	Manny Hazard	19	Nov. 4, 1989 Houston
13	Manny Hazard	19	Nov. 11, 1989 Houston
13	Josh Reed	19	Nov. 3, 2001 LSU
13	Nate Burleson	19	Nov. 9, 2002 Nevada
13	James Cleveland	19	Dec. 5, 2009 Houston
13	Tommy Shuler	19	Sep. 29, 2012 Marshall
13	Nelson Spruce	19	Sep. 27, 2014 Colorado
13	Zay Jones	19	Oct. 29, 2016 East Carolina
13	Tyler Snead	19	Nov. 9, 2019 East Carolina
13	Romeo Doubs	19	Oct. 23, 2021 Nevada
