= Justin Hardy =

American football player (born 1991)

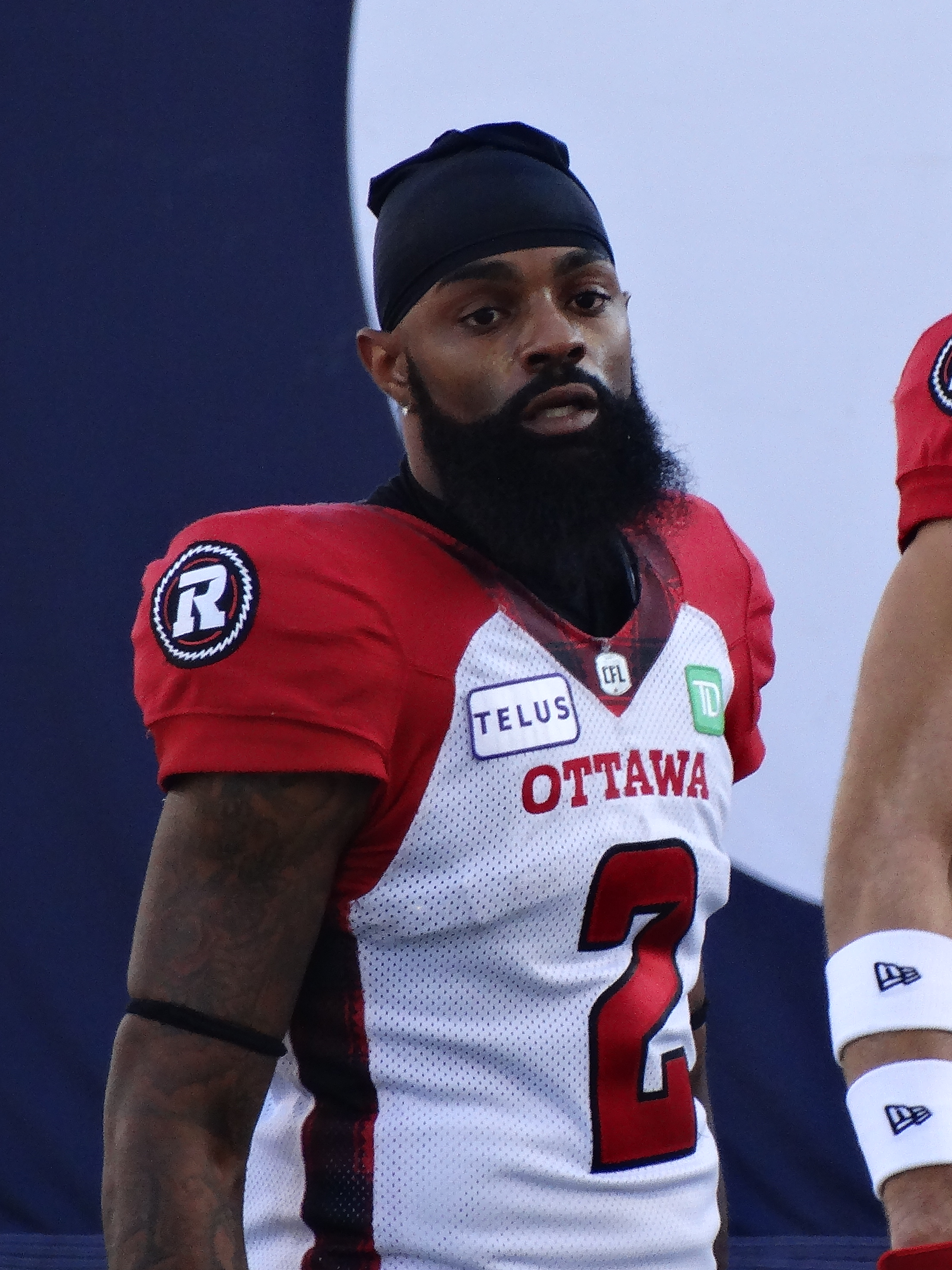
- Hardy with the Ottawa Redblacks in 2024

No. 2 – Ottawa Redblacks
- Position: Wide receiver
- Roster status: Reserve
- CFL status: American

Personal information
- Born: December 18, 1991 (age 34); Washington, North Carolina, U.S.
- Listed height: 5 ft 10 in (1.78 m)
- Listed weight: 192 lb (87 kg)

Career information
- High school: West Craven (Vanceboro, North Carolina)
- College: East Carolina (2010–2014)
- NFL draft: 2015: 4th round, 107th overall pick

Career history
- Atlanta Falcons (2015–2019); Chicago Bears (2021)*; Ottawa Redblacks (2022–present)
- * Offseason or practice squad member only

Awards and highlights
- CFL All-Star (2024); 3× CFL East All-Star (2023, 2024, 2025); Burlsworth Trophy (2014); First-team All-AAC (2014); 2× First-team All-C-USA (2012, 2013)

Career NFL statistics
- Receptions: 95
- Receiving yards: 946
- Receiving touchdowns: 9
- Stats at Pro Football Reference

Career CFL statistics as of 2025
- Targets: 435
- Receptions: 304
- Receiving yards: 3,787
- Receiving touchdowns: 16
- Stats at CFL.ca

Justin Hardy (born December 18, 1991) is an American professional football wide receiver for the Ottawa Redblacks of the Canadian Football League (CFL). He was selected by the Atlanta Falcons of the National Football League (NFL) in the fourth round of the 2015 NFL draft. He played college football for the East Carolina Pirates. Hardy was the NCAA all-time reception leader until his former teammate Zay Jones overtook his record during the 2016 season.

== Early life ==
Hardy attended West Craven High School in Vanceboro, North Carolina. As a senior on the football team, he played quarterback after previously being a wide receiver. That season, he passed for 2,500 yards and had 35 passing touchdowns. Hardy also picked two additional letters as a shooting and point guard in basketball and another in track as a high jumper (best of 6-4 or 1.93m).

== College career ==
Hardy redshirted as a freshman at East Carolina University in 2010 after joining the program as a walk-on having been recruited by offensive coordinator Lincoln Riley. Prior to the 2011 season, he earned a scholarship in the spring of 2011. In his first collegiate game, Hardy recorded a season-high 11 receptions for 91 yards and a touchdown in a season-opening loss to South Carolina. In Week 4 against North Carolina, he recorded 10 receptions for 73 yards in a loss. Following a Week 6 victory over Memphis, where he had five receptions for 85 yards and a touchdown, Hardy suffered a knee injury that sidelined him for the next two games. In the season finale against Marshall, he recorded a season-high 92 receiving yards on seven receptions in an overtime loss. He appeared in 10 games with eight starts and finished the season with a school freshman record 64 receptions for 658 yards and six touchdowns.

In 2012, Hardy appeared in all 13 games with 12 starts and finished the season with 88 receptions for 1,105 yards and 11 touchdowns earning first team all All-Conference USA. He recorded five games with at least 100 receiving yards, including a season-high 171 yards on 16 receptions in the regular-season finale against Marshall, an overtime victory. Hardy also posted a career-high two touchdown receptions against Memphis, recording six catches for 137 yards in the win, and scored a touchdown in nine different games. He added 175 punt return yards on 20 attempts, leading the team, and was named second-team All-Conference USA as a punt returner. In the 2012 New Orleans Bowl against Louisiana, Hardy recorded five receptions for 59 yards and a touchdown in a loss.

Hardy began his 2013 season by tying the program record with 16 receptions for 191 yards in a season-opening victory over Old Dominion. In Week 6 against Tulane, he set the program single-game record with 17 receptions for 230 yards in a 36–33 triple overtime loss. His 230 receiving yards surpassed Terry Gallaher's previous school record of 218 yards set in 1975. East Carolina won its next five games, with Hardy recording a touchdown reception in each victory. The Pirates finished the regular season with a 9–3 record and earned a berth in the 2013 Beef 'O' Brady's Bowl. Against Ohio, Hardy recorded nine receptions for 66 yards in the victory, setting the Beef ‘O’ Brady’s Bowl record for receptions. During the game, he also surpassed Dwayne Harris' program career receiving yards record of 3,001 yards, becoming East Carolina's all-time leader with 3,047 yards. The 10-win season marked only the second time in program history that East Carolina reached the milestone and the first since 1991. Hardy finished the season ranked third in the FBS with 114 receptions, trailing Davante Adams and Brandin Cooks, while totaling a program-record 1,284 receiving yards and eight touchdowns. His 114 receptions also set an East Carolina single-season record. For his performance, he was named first-team All-Conference USA for the second consecutive season.

Hardy began the 2014 season with eight receptions for 87 yards and two touchdowns in a victory over NC Central. During the game, he became East Carolina's all-time leader in career receptions, surpassing Harris' record of 268. He also completed a 41-yard touchdown pass to Zay Jones. The following week, he recorded 11 receptions for 133 yards in a loss to South Carolina. In Week 5 against SMU, he had eight receptions for 120 yards and three touchdowns in a 45–24 victory. Over the next two weeks, in consecutive victories against South Florida and UConn, he recorded 10 receptions for 114 yards and 14 receptions for 186 yards and a touchdown, respectively. In Week 9 against Cincinnati, Hardy posted a season-high 15 receptions for 188 yards and a touchdown while also scoring a seven-yard rushing touchdown on the first rushing attempt of his collegiate career in a loss. The following week against Tulane, he became the NCAA FBS all-time leader in career receptions, surpassing Ryan Broyles' record of 349, after recording nine receptions for 104 yards in a victory. In the regular-season finale against UCF, he caught 12 passes for 140 yards and a touchdown in a loss. East Carolina finished the regular season with an 8–4 record and earned a berth in the Birmingham Bowl. Against Florida in his final collegiate game, Hardy recorded 11 receptions for 160 yards and a touchdown in a loss. He appeared in all 13 games with 13 starts, finishing the season with 121 receptions, which ranked second in the FBS behind Amari Cooper's 124, and 1,494 receiving yards, which ranked fourth nationally, along with 10 receiving touchdowns. He also threw a touchdown pass and rushed for a touchdown. Hardy additionally led the team with 23 punt returns for 95 yards, recorded eight 100-yard receiving games, and had six games with at least 10 receptions. For his performance, he was named first-team All-AAC and won the Burlsworth Trophy. He later appeared in the 2015 Senior Bowl, where he teamed up with fellow East Carolina teammate Shane Carden and represented the North All-Stars in a 34–13 victory. Hardy recorded one reception for eight yards in the game.

Hardy concluded his collegiate career as the NCAA FBS all-time leader in career receptions with 387, while totaling 4,541 receiving yards and 35 receiving touchdowns. He also finished as East Carolina's all-time leader in receptions, receiving yards, and receiving touchdowns. During his collegiate career, he recorded 17 100-yard receiving games, 15 games with at least 10 receptions, and three games with multiple touchdown receptions. In November 2025, Hardy was inducted into the East Carolina Hall of Fame.

== Professional career ==
Pre-draft measurables
Height	Weight	Arm length	Hand span	Wingspan	40-yard dash	10-yard split	20-yard split	20-yard shuttle	Three-cone drill	Vertical jump	Broad jump	Bench press
5 ft 10 1/4 in (1.78 m)	192 lb (87 kg)	32 1/8 in (0.82 m)	10 in (0.25 m)	6 ft 5 1/2 in (1.97 m)	4.56 s	1.57 s	2.62 s	4.21 s	6.63 s	36.5 in (0.93 m)	9 ft 6 in (2.90 m)	11 reps
All values from NFL Combine

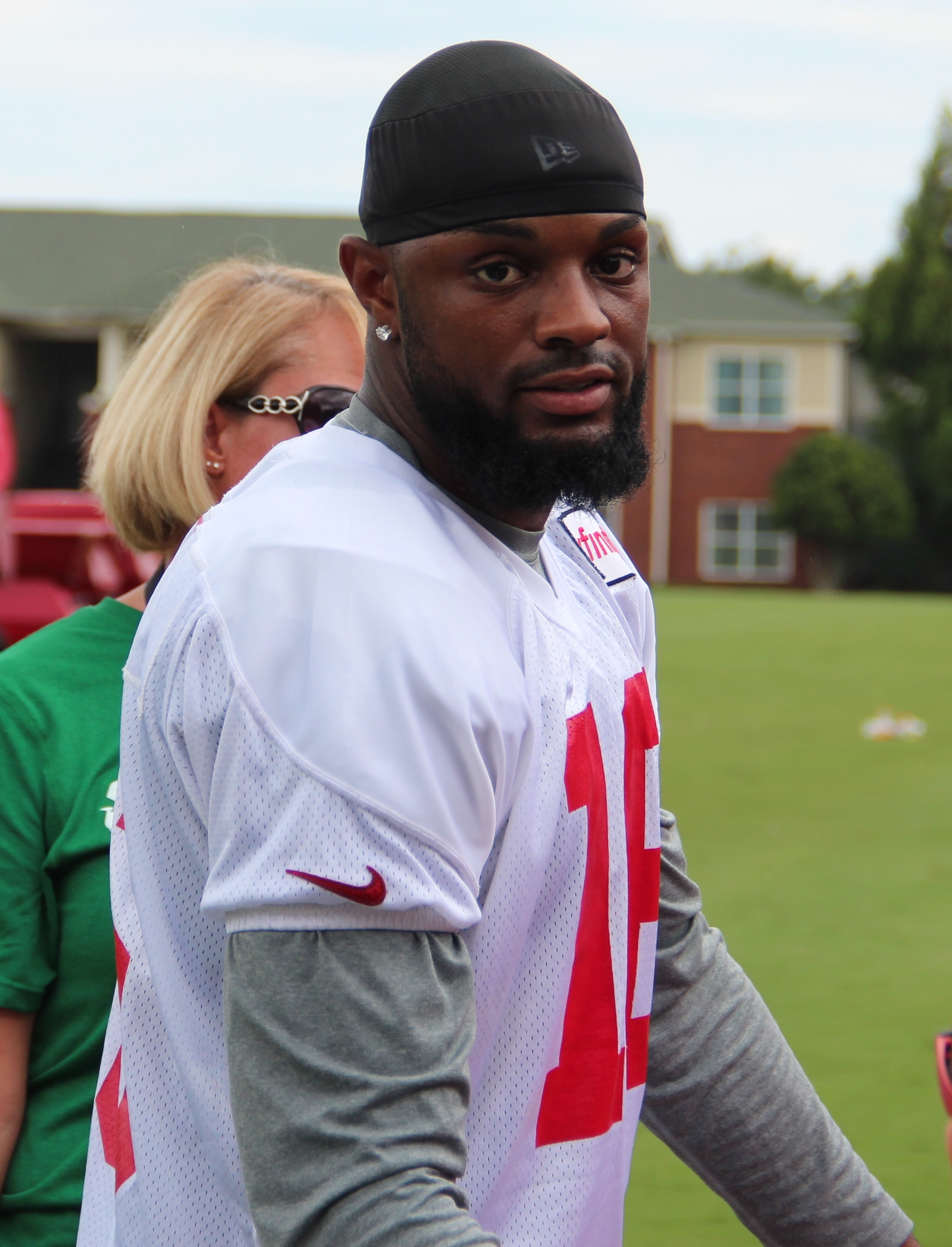
Hardy with the Atlanta Falcons in 2015

=== Atlanta Falcons ===
Hardy was selected by the Atlanta Falcons in the fourth round (107th overall) of the 2015 NFL draft. He began the 2015 season on the inactive list for the first seven weeks of the season. He made his NFL debut in Week 8 against the Tampa Bay Buccaneers, recording two receptions for 21 yards in an overtime loss. He made his first NFL start the following week against the San Francisco 49ers, recording four receptions for 17 yards in a loss. On the season, he appeared in nine games and finished with 21 receptions for 194 yards.

In Week 2 of the 2016 season against the Oakland Raiders, Hardy scored his first career touchdown when he caught a deflected pass from Matt Ryan in the end zone. On the season, he appeared in all 16 games and made three starts while recording 21 receptions for 203 yards and four touchdowns. The Falcons finished with an 11–5 record, winning the NFC South and earning a top seed in the NFC playoffs. In the NFC Divisional Playoff against the Philadelphia Eagles, Hardy recorded two receptions for 18 yards in the Falcons' 36–20 win. In the NFC Championship Game against the Green Bay Packers, Hardy appeared on offense and special teams, recording a tackle in the win. The Falcons advanced to Super Bowl LI, where they faced the New England Patriots. In the Super Bowl, Hardy returned two kickoffs for 17 yards and recorded a solo special teams tackle on Patrick Chung for a one-yard loss as the Falcons fell 34–28 in overtime.

In 2017, Hardy appeared in all 16 games for the second consecutive season and made one start in the regular-season finale, recording 20 receptions for 221 yards and three touchdowns. The Falcons finished with a 10–6 record and qualified for the playoffs as a wild card team. In the NFC Wild Card Game against the Los Angeles Rams, Hardy recorded one reception for three yards in the victory. The Falcons were eliminated the following week in the NFC Divisional Playoffs against the Philadelphia Eagles, where Hardy appeared on offense and special teams.

During the 2018 season, Hardy recorded 14 receptions for 133 yards and two touchdowns while taking on an increased role on special teams. He became the team's primary punt returner, leading the Falcons with 20 punt returns for 147 yards. On March 13, 2019, Hardy became an unrestricted free agent before re-signing with Atlanta on March 22.

In Hardy's final season with the Falcons in 2019, he appeared in all 16 regular-season games and made one start, finishing with 19 receptions for 195 yards. On March 18, 2020, Hardy became an unrestricted free agent but was not re-signed. Hardy finished his five-year career with the Falcons having appeared in 73 games with six starts. He played in every game from Week 8 of the 2015 season through the conclusion of the 2019 season. He recorded 95 receptions for 946 yards and nine touchdowns while playing 726 special teams snaps. As a returner, he totaled 20 punt returns for 147 yards and five kickoff returns for 59 yards, while recording nine total tackles.

=== Chicago Bears ===
On July 27, 2021, Hardy signed with the Chicago Bears. He was released on August 17, 2021.

=== Ottawa Redblacks ===
On March 18, 2022, Hardy signed with the Ottawa Redblacks of the Canadian Football League (CFL). He made his CFL debut in Week 1 against the Winnipeg Blue Bombers in a loss. The following week, also against Winnipeg, he suffered a hamstring injury that sidelined him for the next 11 games. In his first game back against the BC Lions, he recorded a season-high 94 receiving yards on five receptions in a loss. The following week against the Montreal Alouettes, he caught a season-high 11 receptions for 79 yards in a victory. He appeared in seven games, all starts, and finished the season with 44 receptions for 416 receiving yards.

Hardy had a breakout season in 2023. He scored his first CFL touchdown in Week 7 in a victory over the Calgary Stampeders, recording seven receptions for 94 yards and a touchdown. He posted his first 100-yard receiving game in Week 15 against the BC Lions with eight receptions for 114 yards. In the regular-season finale against the Toronto Argonauts, he recorded six receptions for a season-high 119 yards and a touchdown in the loss. Hardy started all 18 regular-season games and finished with 85 receptions for 1,009 receiving yards and three touchdowns. He was named a CFL East Division All-Star. On February 5, 2024, he re-signed with the Redblacks on a one-year contract.

Hardy opened the 2024 season with back-to-back 100-yard receiving games against Winnipeg and Montreal, including a season-high 143 receiving yards against Montreal. He recorded eight 100-yard receiving games during the season as the Redblacks qualified for the postseason for the first time since 2018. In the East Semi-Final, he had eight receptions for 83 yards in a loss to the Toronto Argonauts. Despite missing two games, he started all 16 games he played and led the CFL with 97 receptions while finishing second in the league with 1,343 receiving yards, behind Justin McInnis' 1,469, and added five touchdown receptions. For his performance, he was named both a CFL All-Star and a CFL East Division All-Star.

On January 22, 2025, Hardy re-signed with the Redblacks on a one-year contract. In Week 1 of the 2025 season against the Saskatchewan Roughriders, Hardy recorded eight receptions for a season-high 133 receiving yards and a touchdown in a loss, extending his streak to five consecutive 100-yard receiving games dating back to the 2024 season. In Weeks 9 and 10 against the Calgary Stampeders and Toronto Argonauts, Hardy recorded back-to-back two-touchdown games. Against Toronto, he caught the game-winning 11-yard touchdown pass from quarterback Dru Brown with under a minute remaining to secure a 46–42 victory. Although the Redblacks finished last in the East Division with a 4–14 record, Hardy led the team in receptions, receiving yards, and receiving touchdowns with 78 catches for 1,019 yards and eight touchdowns. He ranked among the CFL's top 10 in all three receiving categories while starting all 18 regular-season games for the second time in his career. He was named a CFL East Division All-Star for the third consecutive season.

On January 1, 2026, Hardy re-signed with the Redblacks. In Week 7 of the 2026 season, Hardy recorded six receptions for 51 yards and a touchdown in an overtime loss to Winnipeg. During the game, he surpassed Greg Ellingson's mark of 332 receptions to move into third place on the Ottawa professional football franchise's all-time receptions list.

== Career statistics ==
Legend
	Led the league
**Bold**	Career high

=== NFL ===
Year	Team	Games		Receiving				
Year	Team	GP	GS	Rec	Yds	Avg	Lng	TD
2015	ATL	9	1	21	194	9.2	23	0
2016	ATL	16	3	21	203	9.7	27	4
2017	ATL	16	1	20	221	11.1	27	3
2018	ATL	16	0	14	133	9.5	19	2
2019	ATL	16	1	19	195	10.3	23	0
Career		73	6	95	946	10.0	27	9

=== CFL ===
Year	Team	Games		Receiving				
Year	Team	GP	GS	Rec	Yds	Avg	Lng	TD
2022	OTT	7	7	44	416	9.5	35	0
2023	OTT	18	18	85	1,009	11.9	54	3
2024	OTT	16	16	**97**	**1,343**	**13.9**	**68**	5
2025	OTT	18	18	78	1,019	13.1	40	**8**
2026	OTT	17	17	90	1,126	12.5	37	7
Career		76	76	394	4,913	12.5	68	23

=== College ===
Year	Team	Games		Receiving				Rushing				Punt returns			
Year	Team	GP	GS	Rec	Yds	Avg	TD	Att	Yds	Avg	TD	Ret	Yds	Avg	TD
2010	East Carolina	Redshirted (redshirt)													
2011	East Carolina	10	8	64	658	10.3	6	0	0	0.0	0	0	0	0.0	0
2012	East Carolina	13	12	88	1,105	12.6	11	0	0	0.0	0	20	175	8.8	0
2013	East Carolina	13	13	114	1,284	11.3	8	0	0	0.0	0	20	225	11.3	0
2014	East Carolina	13	13	121	1,494	12.3	10	1	7	7.0	1	23	95	4.1	0
Career		49	46	387	4,541	11.7	35	1	7	7.0	1	63	495	7.9	0

== Career highlights ==
=== Awards and honors ===
CFL

- CFL All-Star (2024)
- CFL receptions leader (2024)
- 3× CFL East All-Star (2023, 2024, 2025)
- East-Division receiving yards leader (2024)
- 2× East-Division receptions leader (2023, 2024)
- CFL Weekly Honour Roll (2025, Week 10)
- Ottawa Redblacks Most Outstanding Player (2024)

College

- Burlsworth Trophy (2014)
- First-team All-AAC (2014)
- 2× First-team All-Conference USA (2012, 2013)
- Second-team All-Conference USA (2012, as a punt returner)
- Phil Steele All-American second-team (2014)
- Associated Press All-American third-team (2014)
- NCAA FBS receptions per game leader: 9.3 (2014)
- Conference USA First-team All-Freshman (2011)
- Phil Steele Second-team All-Freshman (2011)
- Bleacher Report HM-team All-Freshman (2011)
- All-C-USA Offensive Player of the Week 7 (10/19/13)
- East Carolina Hall of Fame (2025)
- East Carolina Most Valuable Player (2012)
- 3× East Carolina Offensive Most Valuable Player (2011, 2013–2014)

=== Records ===
NCAA

- NCAA FBS career receptions leader: 387 (2011–2014) (surpassed by Zay Jones in 2016 with 399)
- NCAA FBS leader in consecutive games with at least two receptions: 49 (2011–2014)

East Carolina

- Career receptions: 387 (2011–2014) (surpassed by Zay Jones in 2016 with 399)
- Career receiving yards: 4,541 (2011–2014)
- Career touchdown receptions: 35 (2011–2014)
- Single-season receptions: 121 (2014) (surpassed by Zay Jones in 2016 with 158)
- Single-season receiving yards: 1,494 (2014) (surpassed by Zay Jones in 2016 with 1,746)
- Single-game receptions: 17 (2013) (surpassed by Zay Jones in 2016 with 22)
- Single-game receiving yards: 230 (2013) (surpassed by Trevon Brown in 2017 with 270)
- Single-game receiving yards in East Carolina Bowl Game history: 160 (2014)

Bowl games

- Single-game receptions Beef ‘O’ Brady’s Bowl: 9 (2013) (surpassed by A. T. Perry in 2022 with 11)
- Single-game receptions Birmingham Bowl: 11 (2014) (surpassed by Deebo Samuel in 2016 with 14)
- Single-game receiving yards Birmingham Bowl: 160 (2014): (surpassed by Deebo Samuel in 2016 with 190)
