= Troy Edwards =

American football player (born 1977)

No. 81, 88, 18, 16
- Position: Wide receiver

Personal information
- Born: April 7, 1977 (age 49); Shreveport, Louisiana, U.S.
- Listed height: 5 ft 10 in (1.78 m)
- Listed weight: 195 lb (88 kg)

Career information
- High school: Huntington (Shreveport)
- College: Louisiana Tech (1995–1998)
- NFL draft: 1999: 1st round, 13th overall pick

Career history
- Pittsburgh Steelers (1999–2001); St. Louis Rams (2002); Jacksonville Jaguars (2003–2004); Tennessee Titans (2005)*; Detroit Lions (2005); Jacksonville Jaguars (2006)*; Grand Rapids Rampage (2007)
- * Offseason or practice squad member only

Awards and highlights
- Joe Greene Great Performance Award (1999); Fred Biletnikoff Award (1998); Paul Warfield Trophy (1998); Consensus All-American (1998); Third-team All-American (1997); NCAA receptions leader (1998); 2× NCAA receiving yards leader (1997, 1998); NCAA receiving touchdowns leader (1998); NCAA scoring leader (1998); NCAA (FBS) record: Receiving touchdowns in a season: 27 (1998)

Career NFL statistics
- Games played: 92
- Receptions: 203
- Receiving yards: 2,404
- Receiving touchdowns: 11
- Stats at Pro Football Reference
- Stats at ArenaFan.com

Troy Edwards (born April 7, 1977) is an American former professional football player who was a wide receiver for seven seasons in the National Football League (NFL). He played college football for the Louisiana Tech Bulldogs, became one of the most prolific receivers in college football history. He earned All-American honors and won the Fred Biletnikoff Award. Edwards was selected by the Pittsburgh Steelers in the first round of the 1999 NFL draft, and played for the Steelers, St. Louis Rams, Jacksonville Jaguars, and Detroit Lions of the NFL. He also played for the Grand Rapids Rampage of the Arena Football League (AFL).

== Early life ==
Edwards was born in Shreveport, Louisiana. He attended Huntington High School in Shreveport, where he played high school football.

== College career ==
Edwards attended Louisiana Tech University, where he played for the Louisiana Tech Bulldogs football team from 1995 to 1998. In 1997, he had an NCAA-leading 1,707 receiving yards. As a senior in 1998, he was recognized as a consensus first-team All-American and won the Fred Biletnikoff Award as the season's outstanding college football receiver at the conclusion of the 1998 season.

In the 1998 season opener versus the Nebraska Cornhuskers, Edwards had 21 catches for 405 yards—the most ever receiving yards in a single game by a college player. His twenty-seven touchdown catches during his 1998 senior year remains the NCAA Division I-A season record. He held the NCAA career record for touchdown receptions with fifty until it was broken by the Rice Owls' Jarett Dillard. His 140 single-season receptions are the third most in Division I-A history, and his 1,996 receiving yards gained during his senior season remain the second most in Division I-A history.

== Professional career ==
Pre-draft measurables
Height	Weight	Arm length	Hand span	40-yard dash	10-yard split	20-yard split	20-yard shuttle	Three-cone drill	Vertical jump	Broad jump
5 ft 9 1/2 in (1.77 m)	191 lb (87 kg)	30 1/8 in (0.77 m)	8 1/2 in (0.22 m)	4.57 s	1.60 s	2.63 s	4.16 s	7.37 s	36.5 in (0.93 m)	9 ft 10 in (3.00 m)
All values from NFL Combine

The Pittsburgh Steelers selected Edwards in the first round (13th pick overall) in the 1999 NFL draft after the team lost out on David Boston to the Arizona Cardinals, making him the team's first draft pick from Louisiana Tech since selecting Hall of Famer Terry Bradshaw first overall in the 1970 NFL draft. Despite high expectations for Edwards, he was quickly passed on the depth chart by other receivers, including Plaxico Burress (the team's first round pick the following year) and most notably Hines Ward, whom the Steelers used a 3rd round pick on the year before Edwards and was initially considered an afterthought when Edwards was drafted. This, combined with head coach Bill Cowher's tendency to run the football, inconsistency at the quarterback position from Kordell Stewart and various backups, and a rare decline in the Steelers on-field success led to Edwards openly admitting to his unhappiness in a 2001 radio interview—a year in which the Steelers returned to Super Bowl contender status. Years later, Edwards admitted that he should have handled his time better in Pittsburgh and blamed his immaturity for failing to live up to expectations.

In 2002, Edwards was traded to the St. Louis Rams, where he played a single season. He also played for the Jacksonville Jaguars in 2003 and 2004, and the Detroit Lions in 2005. In seven NFL seasons, he played in ninety-two games, started twenty-two of them, caught 203 passes for 2,404 yards and eleven touchdowns, and also compiled 1,560 punt return yards.

He finished his professional football career with the Grand Rapids Rampage of the Arena Football League in 2007.

== NFL career statistics ==
Legend
**Bold**	Career high

Year	Team	GP	Receiving						Rushing						Punt returns					Kickoff returns			
Year	Team	GP	Rec	Yds	Avg	Lng	TD	FD	Att	Yds	Avg	Lng	TD	FD	Ret	Yds	Lng	TD	FC	Ret	Yds	Lng	TD
1999	PIT	16	**61**	**714**	11.7	41	**5**	**42**	—	—	—	—	—	—	**25**	**234**	**48**	0	**4**	13	234	44	0
2000	PIT	14	18	215	11.9	27	0	11	3	4	1.3	15	0	**1**	0	0	0	0	1	15	298	37	0
2001	PIT	16	19	283	**14.9**	57	0	12	**5**	**28**	5.6	12	**1**	**1**	10	83	28	0	0	**20**	**462**	**81**	0
2002	STL	14	18	157	8.7	48	2	8	3	21	**7.0**	**27**	0	**1**	0	0	0	0	0	10	211	32	0
2003	JAX	13	35	487	13.9	**84**	3	22	3	-9	-3.0	4	0	0	0	0	0	0	0	1	20	20	0
2004	JAX	16	50	533	10.7	36	1	25	2	2	1.0	2	0	0	3	26	14	0	1	15	335	45	0
2005	DET	3	2	15	7.5	8	0	1	—	—	—	—	—	—	—	—	—	—	—	—	—	—	—
Career		92	203	2,404	11.8	84	11	121	16	46	2.9	27	1	3	38	343	48	0	6	74	1,560	81	0

== See also ==
- List of NCAA major college football yearly receiving leaders
- List of NCAA Division I FBS career receiving touchdowns leaders
- List of NCAA major college football yearly scoring leaders
- List of Arena Football League and National Football League players
