= Corey Davis (wide receiver) =

American football player (born 1995)

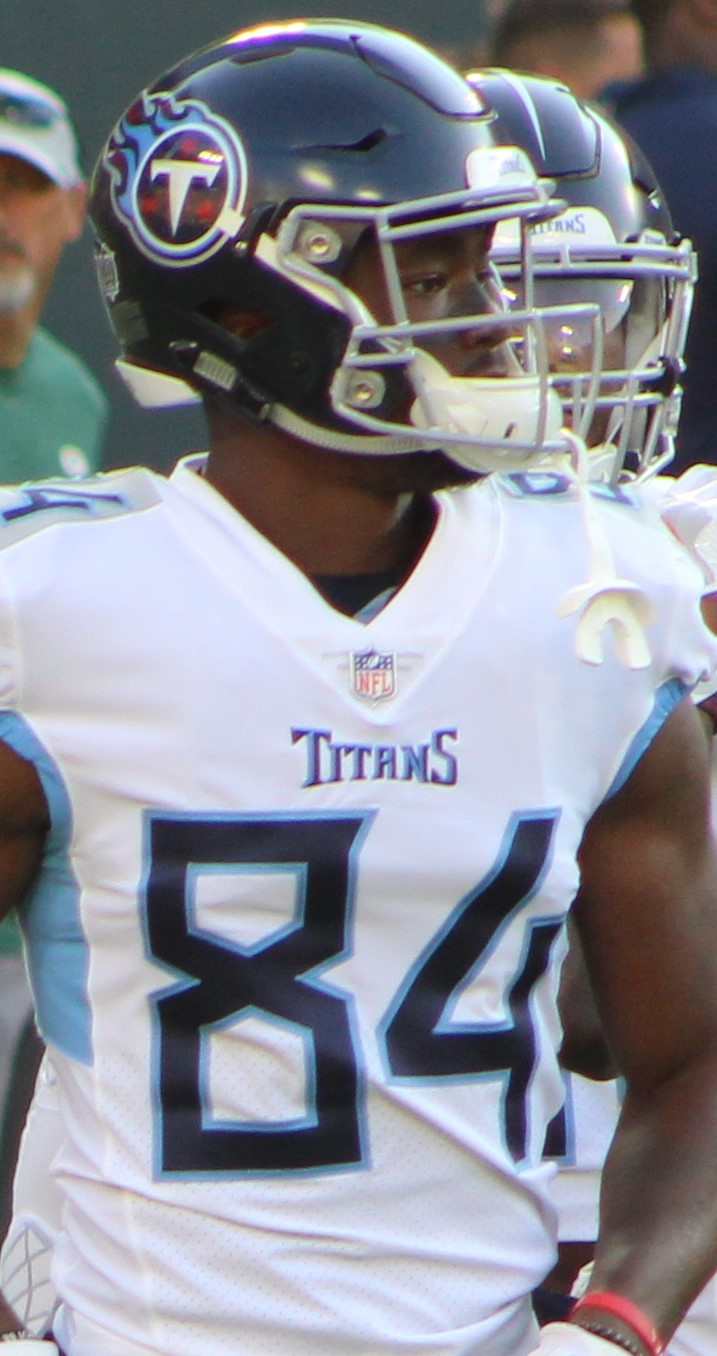
- Davis with the Tennessee Titans in 2018

No. 84
- Position: Wide receiver

Personal information
- Born: January 11, 1995 (age 31); Wheaton, Illinois, U.S.
- Listed height: 6 ft 3 in (1.91 m)
- Listed weight: 209 lb (95 kg)

Career information
- High school: Wheaton Warrenville South
- College: Western Michigan (2013–2016)
- NFL draft: 2017: 1st round, 5th overall pick

Career history
- Tennessee Titans (2017–2020); New York Jets (2021–2022)

Awards and highlights
- First-team All-American (2016); MAC Offensive Player of the Year (2016); Paul Warfield Trophy (2016); NCAA receiving touchdowns co-leader (2016); 3× First-team All-MAC (2014–2016); MAC Freshman of the Year (2013)

Career NFL statistics
- Receptions: 273
- Receiving yards: 3,879
- Receiving touchdowns: 17
- Stats at Pro Football Reference

Corey Damon Davis (born January 11, 1995) is an American former professional football player who was a wide receiver in the National Football League (NFL). He played college football for the Western Michigan Broncos, where he became the NCAA Division I FBS leader in career receiving yards. Davis was selected by the Tennessee Titans fifth overall in the 2017 NFL draft, where he played for four seasons before signing with the New York Jets.

== Early life ==
The second youngest of seven siblings, Davis attended Wheaton Warrenville South High School in Wheaton, Illinois. As a sophomore, he was called up to varsity to play alongside his big brother Titus Davis, who went on to become the all-time leading receiver in touchdowns and yards from scrimmage for Central Michigan University. The duo were part of the Tigers 2010 perfect 14–0 Illinois Class 7A state championship team. As a senior, Corey finished the season with 45 receptions and six touchdowns. During his youth football years playing for the Wheaton Rams, Davis forged a close friendship with the son of former Tampa Bay Buccaneers player Dan Graham. At the end of his junior year, Davis decided to move out of his family's two-bedroom apartment and move in with the Graham family, and they would later become Davis' legal guardians. Davis did not receive any scholarships until late in his senior year. Davis struggled in school throughout his first three years of high school. The Grahams hired a personal tutor for Davis so that he could get his grade point average high enough to be eligible to receive an NCAA scholarship. After graduation, Davis committed to Western Michigan University to play college football, which was his only Division I scholarship.

== College career ==
As a true freshman at Western Michigan in 2013, Davis set school freshman records with 67 receptions for 941 yards and was named the Mid-American Conference (MAC) Freshman of the Year.

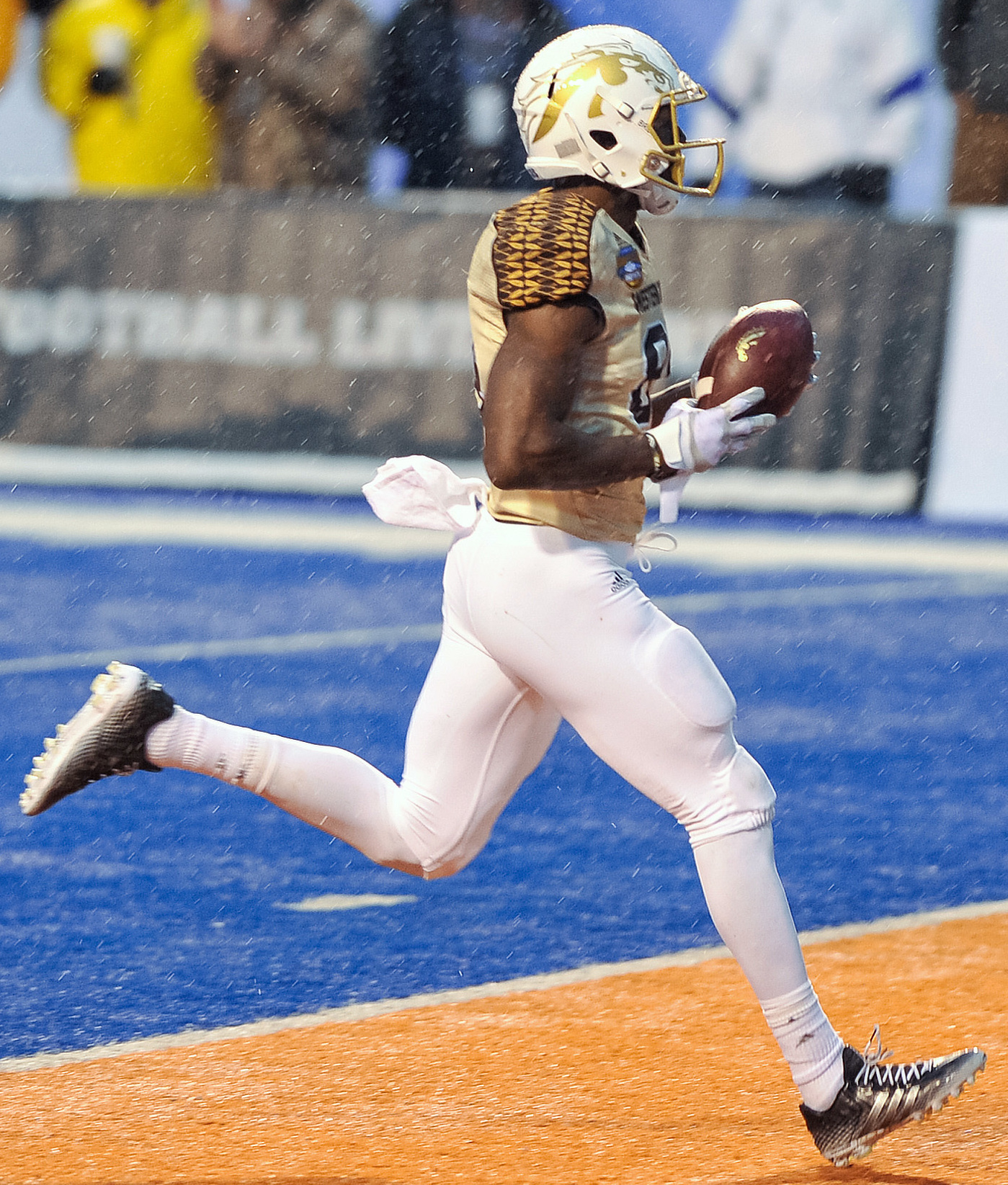
Davis scoring a touchdown for Western Michigan at the 2014 Famous Idaho Potato Bowl

As a sophomore in 2014, Davis had 78 receptions for 1,408 yards and 15 touchdowns.

As a junior in 2015, Davis had 90 receptions for 1,436 yards and 12 touchdowns.

Against the Toledo Rockets on November 25, 2016, Davis became the all-time FBS leader in receiving yards, breaking the record previously held by Nevada's Trevor Insley. He finished the season with 97 receptions for 1,500 yards and 19 touchdowns, tying for the national lead in receiving touchdowns. Davis was named MAC Offensive Player of the Year and first-team All-MAC, won the Paul Warfield Trophy as the nation's top collegiate wide receiver, and was named a first-team All-American.

Davis majored in sports management.

== Professional career ==
=== Pre-draft ===
Davis attended the NFL Scouting Combine, but was unable to participate in athletic drills due to an ankle injury. Davis reportedly scored 31 on the Wonderlic test. Despite an injury leaving him unable to perform pre-draft workouts, Davis was still considered a top wide receiver prospect eligible for the 2017 NFL draft class.

External videos
- Corey Davis NFL Combine video

Pre-draft measurables
| Height | Weight | Arm length | Hand span | Wonderlic |
|---|---|---|---|---|
| 6 ft 2 3/4 in (1.90 m) | 209 lb (95 kg) | 33 in (0.84 m) | 9 1/8 in (0.23 m) | 31 |
All values from NFL Combine

=== Tennessee Titans ===
==== 2017 season ====
The Tennessee Titans selected Davis in the first round (fifth overall) of the 2017 NFL Draft. He is the highest draft selection from Western Michigan University. On July 29, 2017, the Titans signed Davis to a fully guaranteed four-year, $25.39 million contract that includes a signing bonus of $16.6 million.

External videos
- Titans select Corey Davis fifth overall

Davis made his NFL debut in the Titans' season-opening 26–16 loss to the Oakland Raiders and caught six passes for 69 yards. Battling a hamstring injury for much of the season, Davis finished his rookie year with 34 receptions for 375 yards in 11 games and nine starts.

On January 13, 2018, Davis caught his first two NFL touchdowns from Marcus Mariota in the Divisional Round against the New England Patriots. He finished the 35–14 road loss with five receptions for 63 yards and the two aforementioned touchdowns.

==== 2018 season ====
During a Week 4 26–23 overtime victory the Philadelphia Eagles, Davis had a career game with nine receptions for 161 yards, including the game-winning touchdown from Marcus Mariota in overtime. During Week 10 against the Patriots, Davis had another great outing, catching seven passes for 125 yards and a touchdown in the 34–10 victory. Two weeks later in a 34–17 road loss to the Houston Texans, he recorded four receptions for 96 yards and a touchdown to go along with a 39-yard rush. In the next game against the New York Jets, Davis had a 12-yard rush and three receptions for 42 yards including the game-winning touchdown with less than a minute remaining.

Davis finished his second professional season with 65 receptions for 891 yards and four touchdowns to go along with 55 rushing yards in 16 games and starts. He led the Titans in receptions, receiving yards, and touchdowns.

==== 2019 season ====
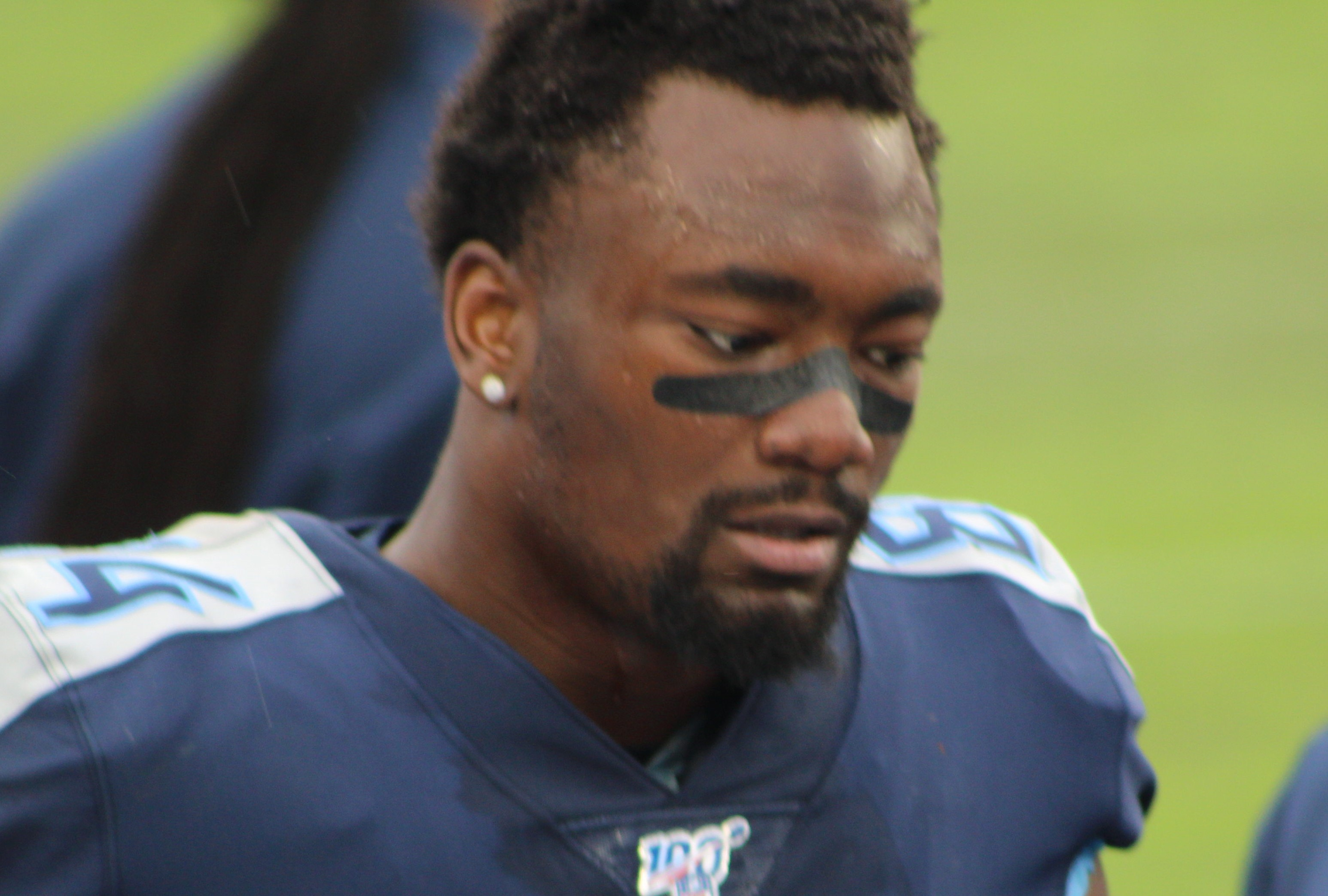
Davis in 2019

During Week 4 against the Atlanta Falcons, Davis had five receptions for 91 yards and his first touchdown of the season in the 24–10 road victory. Three weeks later against the Los Angeles Chargers, Davis caught six passes for 80 yards and his second touchdown of the season in the 23–20 victory. He did not play in Week 10 against the Kansas City Chiefs due to a hip injury.

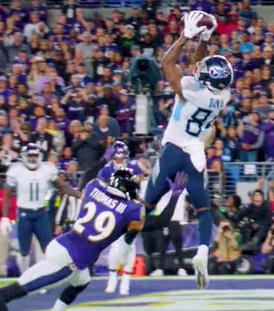
Davis catching a touchdown against the Baltimore Ravens in the Divisional Round

Davis finished the 2019 season with 43 receptions for 601 yards and two touchdowns in 15 games and 11 starts. In the Divisional Round against the Baltimore Ravens, Davis caught a three-yard touchdown pass from running back Derrick Henry during the 28–12 road victory.

==== 2020 season ====
On May 1, 2020, the Titans declined the fifth-year option on Davis' contract, making him a free agent in 2021. He was placed on the team's active/physically unable to perform list at the start of training camp on July 28. He was activated on August 17 after passing a physical.

During the season-opener against the Denver Broncos on Monday Night Football, Davis had seven receptions for 101 yards in the narrow 16–14 victory. In the next game against the Jacksonville Jaguars, he caught three passes for 36 yards and a touchdown during the 33–30 victory. Davis was placed on the reserve/COVID-19 list on October 7, and was activated on October 19.

During a Week 7 27–24 loss to the Pittsburgh Steelers, Davis recorded six receptions for 35 yards and a touchdown. In the next game against the Cincinnati Bengals, he had eight receptions for 128 yards and a touchdown during the 31–20 road loss. Two weeks later, Davis elected to play against the Indianapolis Colts a day after the death of his older brother to cancer, catching five passes for 67 yards in the 34–17 loss. In the next game against the Ravens, Davis caught five passes for 113 yards during the 30–24 overtime road victory.

During Week 12 against the Colts, Davis caught three passes for 70 yards in the 45–26 road victory. In the next game against the Cleveland Browns, he had 11 receptions for 182 yards (both career highs) and a touchdown during the 41–35 loss. Two weeks later against the Detroit Lions, Davis recorded four receptions for 110 yards and a 75-yard touchdown in the 46–25 victory.

Davis finished the 2020 season with 65 receptions for 984 yards and five touchdowns in 14 games and 12 starts. Following the season, he was ranked 91st by his fellow players on the NFL Top 100 Players of 2021.

=== New York Jets ===
==== 2021 season ====
On March 18, 2021, Davis signed with the New York Jets on a three-year, $37.5 million contract.

Davis made his Jets debut in the season-opening 19–14 road loss to the Carolina Panthers, recording five receptions for 97 yards and two touchdowns. Three weeks later against his former team, the Tennessee Titans, Davis had four receptions for 111 yards and a touchdown in the 27–24 overtime victory.

During a Week 7 54–13 road loss to the Patriots, Davis caught four passes for 47 yards and a touchdown. Three weeks later against the Buffalo Bills, he recorded five receptions for 93 yards in the 45–17 loss.

On December 7, 2021, Davis was placed on injured reserve after undergoing core muscle surgery. He finished his first season with the Jets with 34 receptions for 492 yards and four touchdowns in nine games and starts.

==== 2022 season ====
During Week 2 against the Browns, Davis recorded two receptions for 83 yards and a touchdown in the narrow 31–30 road victory. Two weeks later against the Steelers, he had five receptions for 74 yards and a touchdown in the 24–20 road victory. However, Davis sprained his knee in the Week 7 16–9 road victory over the Broncos and missed the next three games as a result.

Davis finished the 2022 season with 32 receptions for 536 yards and two touchdowns in 13 games and 10 starts.

=== Temporary retirement ===
On August 23, 2023, Davis announced via his Instagram page that he was taking a break from football. Davis' roster status was announced to be reserve/retired, meaning while retired, the Jets retained his rights should he decide to return.

On March 14, 2024, Davis applied for reinstatement, and the Jets officially released him off of the reserve/retired list, making Davis a free agent. On August 14, he worked out for the Buffalo Bills. However, three days later, it was reported that Davis did not want to return to the NFL.

== Career statistics ==
=== NFL ===
==== Regular season ====
| Year | Team | Games | | Receiving | | | | | Rushing | | | | | Fumbles | |
| Year | Team | GP | GS | Rec | Yds | Avg | Lng | TD | Att | Yds | Avg | Lng | TD | Fum | Lost |
|---|---|---|---|---|---|---|---|---|---|---|---|---|---|---|---|
| 2017 | TEN | 11 | 9 | 34 | 375 | 11.0 | 37 | 0 | 0 | 0 | 0.0 | 0 | 0 | 1 | **1** |
| 2018 | TEN | **16** | **16** | **65** | 891 | 13.7 | 51 | 4 | **6** | **55** | **9.2** | **39** | 0 | 1 | 0 |
| 2019 | TEN | 15 | 11 | 43 | 601 | 14.0 | 38 | 2 | 0 | 0 | 0.0 | 0 | 0 | 1 | 0 |
| 2020 | TEN | 14 | 12 | **65** | **984** | 15.1 | **75** | **5** | 0 | 0 | 0.0 | 0 | 0 | 1 | **1** |
| 2021 | NYJ | 9 | 9 | 34 | 492 | 14.5 | 53 | 4 | 0 | 0 | 0.0 | 0 | 0 | **2** | **1** |
| 2022 | NYJ | 13 | 10 | 32 | 536 | **16.8** | 66 | 2 | 0 | 0 | 0.0 | 0 | 0 | 0 | 0 |
| Career | | 78 | 67 | 273 | 3,879 | 14.2 | 75 | 17 | 6 | 55 | 9.2 | 39 | 0 | 6 | 3 |

==== Postseason ====
| Year | Team | Games | | Receiving | | | | | Rushing | | | | | Fumbles | |
| Year | Team | GP | GS | Rec | Yds | Avg | Lng | TD | Att | Yds | Avg | Lng | TD | Fum | Lost |
|---|---|---|---|---|---|---|---|---|---|---|---|---|---|---|---|
| 2017 | TEN | 2 | 2 | **9** | **98** | 10.9 | 17 | **2** | 0 | 0 | 0.0 | 0 | 0 | 0 | 0 |
| 2019 | TEN | **3** | **3** | 6 | 68 | **11.3** | **22** | 1 | 0 | 0 | 0.0 | 0 | 0 | 0 | 0 |
| 2020 | TEN | 1 | 0 | 0 | 0 | 0.0 | 0 | 0 | 0 | 0 | 0.0 | 0 | 0 | 0 | 0 |
| Career | | 6 | 5 | 15 | 166 | 11.1 | 22 | 3 | 0 | 0 | 0.0 | 0 | 0 | 0 | 0 |

=== College ===
Legend
| | NCAA record |
| | Co-led the NCAA |
| **Bold** | Career high |

| Season | Team | GP | Receiving | | | | Rushing | | | |
| Season | Team | GP | Rec | Yds | Avg | TD | Att | Yds | Avg | TD |
|---|---|---|---|---|---|---|---|---|---|---|
| 2013 | Western Michigan | 11 | 67 | 941 | 14.0 | 6 | **1** | 2 | 2.0 | 0 |
| 2014 | Western Michigan | 12 | 78 | 1,408 | **18.1** | 15 | 0 | 0 | 0.0 | 0 |
| 2015 | Western Michigan | 13 | 90 | 1,436 | 16.0 | 12 | **1** | **11** | **11.0** | 0 |
| 2016 | Western Michigan | 14 | **97** | **1,500** | 15.5 | **19** | 1 | 0 | 0.0 | 0 |
| Career | | 50 | 332 | 5,285 | 15.9 | 52 | 3 | 13 | 4.3 | 0 |
