= Mission of Hope =

American nonprofit organization

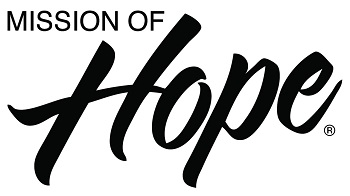
- Formation: 1998
- Founder: Brad Johnson; Vanessa Johnson
- Founded at: Cedar Park, Texas
- Type: 501(c)(3) Nonprofit
- Region served: Haiti; Dominican Republic; United States
- Services: Education, Housing, Food Security, Medical Care, Orphan Care, Disaster Relief
- Website: missionofhope.com

Mission of Hope is a faith-based, nonprofit humanitarian organization founded in 1998 by Brad and Vanessa Johnson, headquartered in Cedar Park, Texas. The organization is primarily focused on improving the quality of life in underserved communities, particularly in Haiti and the Dominican Republic by providing education, medical care, nutrition, orphan care, and disaster relief programs. Each year, hundreds of volunteers collaborate with Mission of Hope to support local initiatives and implement community-based solutions.

== Overview and mission ==
Mission of Hope was established by Brad and Vanessa Johnson in 1998 to deliver resources and educational opportunities for Haitians. The organization operates a residential education facility for children in Haiti. Unlike traditional orphanages, Mission of Hope’s model emphasizes nurturing and educating children within their communities, aiming to foster future leaders. In its early years, the organization also strengthened local food distribution by providing essential equipment like forklifts.

Beyond education, Mission of Hope provides disaster relief, housing solutions, and medical care. The organization arranges annual church mission trips to support initiatives in Haiti. Beyond Haiti, Mission of Hope has expanded its humanitarian work to include community support programs in the Dominican Republic.

As of 2021, Mission of Hope employed 418 staff in Haiti. By 2023, the organization was distributing food to over 125,000 children daily through a network of more than 1,700 locations, in partnership with local churches across Haiti and the Dominican Republic. Mission of Hope has also constructed over 1,500 homes, as well as infrastructure like roads and electric grids.

Mission of Hope has a record of disaster relief efforts, including response to the 2010 earthquake in Haiti. In 2021, the organization provided assistance in response to multiple crises: the assassination of President Jovenel Moïse in July, followed by a 7.2 magnitude earthquake and Tropical Storm Grace in August.

In 2024, amid escalating gang violence in Haiti, Mission of Hope sustained its operations, providing essential services in education, nutrition, and medical care despite the challenging security environment.

== Community Support and Collaborations ==
Mission of Hope’s work is bolstered by collaboration with other organizations and community initiatives. Following Hurricane Matthew in 2016, the organization partnered with Convoy of Hope, donating 45 containers filled with approximately 12 million meals, medical supplies, and hygiene kits to Haiti. This effort was supported logistically by BNSF Railway and Fortress Investment Group.

In 2022, the Mission of Hope began collaborating with 1C-The Sanctuary to host annual fundraising dinners, focused on providing food packs for Haiti and the Dominican Republic. In 2023, Causeway Coffee opened in Miramar Beach, with owners Chris and Jamie Harper pledging all net proceeds to support Mission of Hope's work.

Additional support has come from individuals and groups. For example, NFL player Carson Wentz and Liberty University students participated in a meal packing event in 2020 organized through Mission of Hope's partnership with Feed My Starving Children. In 2024, Gage Holder led an initiative for the Taylor University football team to hold a mission trip to the Dominican Republic on behalf of Mission of Hope. Families, such as the Turner family, have also sustained their involvement after participating in mission trips to Haiti.
