= Southern Miss Golden Eagles football statistical leaders =

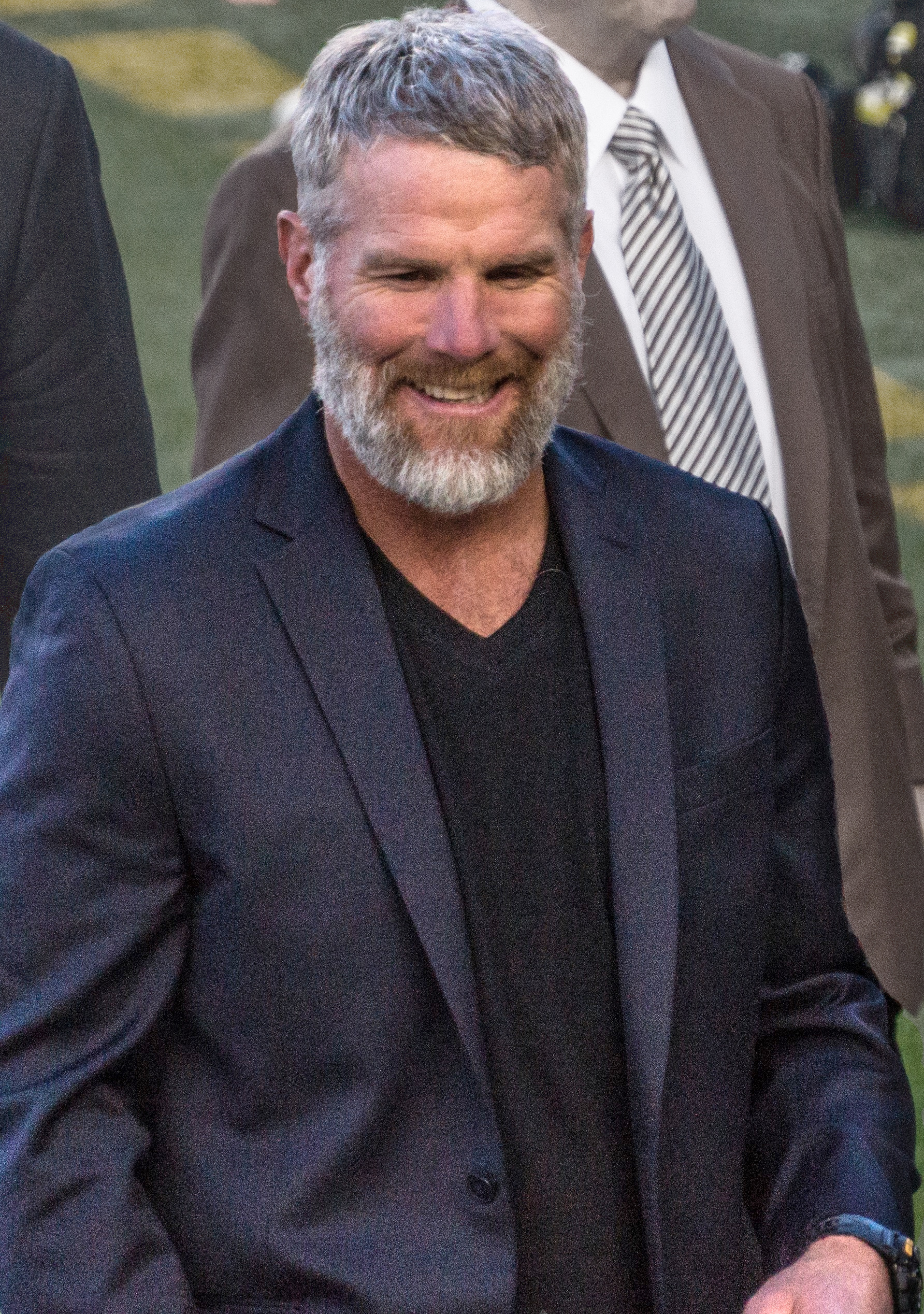
Quarterback Brett Favre set Golden Eagle passing records in 1990 that stood for 30 years before being broken by Austin Davis and then Nick Mullens.

The Southern Miss Golden Eagles football statistical leaders are individual statistical leaders of the Southern Miss Golden Eagles football program in various categories, including passing, rushing, receiving, total offense, defensive stats, and kicking. Within those areas, the lists identify single-game, single-season, and career leaders. The Golden Eagles represent the University of Southern Mississippi in the NCAA Division I FBS Sun Belt Conference.

Although Southern Miss began competing in intercollegiate football in 1912, the school's official record book considers the "modern era" to have begun in 1947. Records from before this year are often incomplete and inconsistent, and they are generally not included in these lists.

These lists are dominated by more recent players for several reasons:

- Since 1947, seasons have increased from 10 games to 11 and then 12 games in length.
- The NCAA didn't allow freshmen to play varsity football until 1972 (with the exception of the World War II years), allowing players to have four-year careers.
- Bowl games only began counting toward single-season and career statistics in 2002. The Golden Eagles have played in 12 bowl games since then, giving players in recent seasons an extra game to accumulate statistics.

These lists are updated through the end of the 2025 season.

== Passing ==
=== Passing yards ===
Career
Rank	Player	Yards	Years
1	Nick Mullens	11,994	2013 2014 2015 2016
2	Austin Davis	10,892	2008 2009 2010 2011
3	Brett Favre	7,695	1987 1988 1989 1990
4	Dustin Almond	7,342	2002 2003 2004 2005
5	Jeff Kelly	7,095	1998 1999 2000 2001
6	Jack Abraham	7,067	2018 2019 2020
7	Lee Roberts	6,289	1995 1996 1997 1998
8	Heath Graham	4,053	1994 1995 1996
9	Rick Donegan	3,753	1969 1970 1971
10	Tommy Waters	3,681	1991 1992 1993 1994

Single season
Rank	Player	Yards	Year
1	Nick Mullens	4,476	2015
2	Austin Davis	3,496	2011
	Jack Abraham	3,496	2019
4	Nick Mullens	3,272	2016
5	Austin Davis	3,128	2008
6	Austin Davis	3,103	2010
7	Braylon Braxton	3,054	2025
8	Dustin Almond	2,860	2005
9	Lee Roberts	2,680	1998
10	Jeff Kelly	2,613	2001

Single game
Rank	Player	Yards	Year	Opponent
1	Nick Mullens	591	2016	Rice
2	Jack Abraham	463	2019	Troy
3	Austin Davis	461	2008	Rice
4	Nick Mullens	447	2015	Nebraska
5	Nick Mullens	426	2014	Middle Tennessee
6	Jack Abraham	421	2019	North Texas
7	Jeff Kelly	400	2001	Tulane
	Braylon Braxton	400	2025	South Alabama
9	Lee Roberts	398	1996	Houston
10	Braylon Braxton	392	2025	Louisiana Tech

=== Passing touchdowns ===
Career
Rank	Player	TDs	Years
1	Nick Mullens	87	2013 2014 2015 2016
2	Austin Davis	83	2008 2009 2010 2011
3	Brett Favre	52	1987 1988 1989 1990
	Lee Roberts	52	1995 1996 1997 1998
5	Jeff Kelly	51	1998 1999 2000 2001
	Dustin Almond	51	2002 2003 2004 2005
7	Jack Abraham	41	2018 2019 2020
8	Braylon Braxton	24	2025
9	Heath Graham	23	1994 1995 1996
	Jeremy Young	23	2004 2005 2006 2007

Single season
Rank	Player	TDs	Year
1	Nick Mullens	38	2015
2	Austin Davis	30	2011
3	Lee Roberts	24	1998
	Nick Mullens	24	2016
	Braylon Braxton	24	2025
6	Dustin Almond	23	2005
	Austin Davis	23	2008
8	Jeff Kelly	21	1999
9	Austin Davis	20	2010
10	Jack Abraham	19	2019

Single game
Rank	Player	TDs	Year	Opponent
1	Lee Roberts	5	1998	Louisiana-Lafayette
	Dustin Almond	5	2005	UCF
	Nick Mullens	5	2013	UAB
	Nick Mullens	5	2015	Rice

== Rushing ==
=== Rushing yards ===
Career
Rank	Player	Yards	Years
1	Damion Fletcher	5,302	2006 2007 2008 2009
2	Ito Smith	4,536	2014 2015 2016 2017
3	Frank Gore Jr.	4,022	2020 2021 2022 2023
4	Ben Garry	3,595	1974 1975 1976 1977
5	Derrick Nix	3,584	1998 1999 2000 2002
6	Sammy Winder	3,114	1978 1979 1980 1981
7	Sam Dejarnette	2,908	1982 1983 1984
8	Vincent Alexander	2,648	1983 1984 1985 1986
9	Shelton Gandy	2,504	1984 1985 1986 1987 1988
10	Reggie Collier	2,304	1979 1980 1981 1982

Single season
Rank	Player	Yards	Year
1	Damion Fletcher	1,586	2007
2	Sam Dejarnette	1,545	1982
3	Ito Smith	1,459	2016
4	Ito Smith	1,413	2017
5	Damion Fletcher	1,388	2006
6	Frank Gore Jr.	1,382	2022
7	Damion Fletcher	1,313	2008
8	Ben Garry	1,236	1976
9	Hugh Laurin Pepper	1,227	1952
10	Derrick Nix	1,194	2002

Single game
Rank	Player	Yards	Year	Opponent
1	Frank Gore Jr.	329	2022	Rice
2	Sam Dejarnette	304	1982	Florida State
3	Damion Fletcher	260	2008	UTEP
4	Frank Gore Jr.	247	2023	Appalachian State
5	Vic Purvis	238	1965	Memphis
6	Jalen Richard	230	2015	Texas State
7	Damion Fletcher	222	2008	Louisiana-Lafayette
8	Derrick Nix	219	1998	Nevada
9	Damion Fletcher	211	2007	UTEP
10	Ben Garry	206	1976	Louisiana Tech

=== Rushing touchdowns ===
Career
Rank	Player	TDs	Years
1	Damion Fletcher	44	2006 2007 2008 2009
2	Ito Smith	42	2014 2015 2016 2017
3	Sammy Winder	39	1978 1979 1980 1981
4	Harold Shaw	32	1994 1995 1996 1997
5	Ben Garry	30	1998 1999 2000 2002
	Derrick Nix	30	1974 1975 1976 1977
7	Doyle Orange	26	1971 1972 1973
	Reggie Collier	26	1979 1980 1981 1982
	Shelton Gandy	26	1984 1985 1986 1987 1988
	Frank Gore Jr.	26	2020 2021 2022 2023

Single season
Rank	Player	TDs	Year
1	Sammy Winder	20	1980
2	Ito Smith	17	2016
3	Harold Shaw	16	1997
4	Sam Dejarnette	14	1982
	Damion Fletcher	14	2007
	Jalen Richard	14	2015
7	Ito Smith	13	2017
8	Doyle Orange	12	1971
	Ricky Floyd	12	1979
	Reggie Collier	12	1981
	Sammy Winder	12	1981
	Reggie Collier	12	1982

Single game
Rank	Player	TDs	Year	Opponent
1	Austin Davis	5	2008	UAB
2	Doyle Orange	4	1972	Texas-Arlington
	Shelton Gandy	4	1986	Mississippi State
	Chris Windsor	4	1996	Louisiana-Lafayette
	Austin Davis	4	2010	Houston
	Jalen Richard	4	2015	Texas State
	Jalen Richard	4	2015	Old Dominion
	Tate Whatley	4	2020	Liberty

== Receiving ==
=== Receptions ===
Career
Rank	Player	Rec	Years
1	Sherrod Gideon	193	1996 1997 1998 1999
2	Quez Watkins	159	2017 2018 2019
3	Shawn Nelson	157	2005 2006 2007 2008
4	Tim Jones	150	2017 2018 2019 2020
5	Todd Pinkston	149	1996 1997 1998 1999
6	LeRoy Handy	138	1999 2000 2001 2002
7	Casey Martin	135	2014 2015
	Jason Brownlee	135	2020 2021 2022
9	DeAndre Brown	134	2008 2009 2010
10	D. J. Thompson	131	2012 2014 2015 2016

Single season
Rank	Player	Rec	Year
1	Casey Martin	80	2015
2	Tim Jones	73	2019
3	Quez Watkins	72	2018
4	Michael Thomas	71	2015
5	DeAndre Brown	67	2008
6	Sherrod Gideon	66	1998
7	Quez Watkins	64	2019
8	Allenzae Staggers	63	2016
9	LeRoy Handy	59	2001
10	Kelvin Bolden	58	2011

Single game
Rank	Player	Rec	Year	Opponent
1	Sherrod Gideon	13	1998	Penn State
2	Todd Pinkston	12	1998	Nevada
	Shawn Nelson	12	2008	Auburn
	DeAndre Brown	12	2008	Rice
	Tyre'oune Holmes	12	2013	Texas State
	D. J. Thompson	12	2016	Louisiana Tech
	Jason Brownlee	12	2022	Troy

=== Receiving yards ===
Career
Rank	Player	Yards	Years
1	Sherrod Gideon	3,214	1996 1997 1998 1999
2	Quez Watkins	2,404	2017 2018 2019
3	Todd Pinkston	2,366	1996 1997 1998 1999
4	DeAndre Brown	2,207	2008 2009 2010
5	Jason Brownlee	2,144	2020 2021 2022
6	Shawn Nelson	2,054	2005 2006 2007 2008
7	Tim Jones	2,011	2017 2018 2019 2020
8	LeRoy Handy	1,890	1999 2000 2001 2002
9	Michael Thomas	1,793	2014 2015
10	Marvin Young	1,717	2001 2002 2003 2004

Single season
Rank	Player	Yards	Year
1	Michael Thomas	1,391	2015
2	Sherrod Gideon	1,186	1998
3	Quez Watkins	1,178	2019
4	Allenzae Staggers	1,165	2016
5	DeAndre Brown	1,117	2008
6	Cliff Coggin	1,087	1949
7	Sherrod Gideon	1,008	1997
8	Todd Pinkston	977	1999
9	Casey Martin	925	2015
10	Tim Jones	902	2019

Single game
Rank	Player	Yards	Year	Opponent
1	Allenzae Staggers	292	2016	Rice
2	Kendrick Lee	260	1996	Houston
3	Allenzae Staggers	230	2016	Louisiana-Lafayette
4	DeAndre Brown	221	2008	Rice
5	Quez Watkins	209	2019	Troy
6	Todd Pinkston	203	1998	Nevada
7	Quez Watkins	198	2019	North Texas
8	Rickey Bradley, Jr.	193	2013	Texas State
9	Sherrod Gideon	192	1998	Alabama
10	Michael Thomas	190	2015	Washington

=== Receiving touchdowns ===
Career
Rank	Player	TDs	Years
1	Sherrod Gideon	30	1996 1997 1998 1999
2	DeAndre Brown	24	2008 2009 2010
3	Todd Pinkston	22	1996 1997 1998 1999
4	Jason Brownlee	21	2020 2021 2022
5	Michael Thomas	19	2014 2015
6	Marvin Young	17	2001 2002 2003 2004
	Quez Watkins	17	2017 2018 2019
8	Shawn Nelson	16	2005 2006 2007 2008
9	Martin Harvey	14	1977 1978 1979 1980
10	Chris McGee	13	1984 1985 1986 1987
	Antwon Courington	13	2002 2003 2004 2005
	Kelvin Bolden	13	2010 2011

Single season
Rank	Player	TDs	Year
1	Michael Thomas	14	2015
2	Sherrod Gideon	13	1998
3	DeAndre Brown	12	2008
4	Todd Pinkston	11	1999
5	Cliff Coggin	9	1949
	Billy Mikel	9	1969
	Sherrod Gideon	9	1997
	DeAndre Brown	9	2009
	Quez Watkins	9	2018
10	Jason Brownlee	8	2021
	Jason Brownlee	8	2022

Single game
Rank	Player	TDs	Year	Opponent
1	DeAndre Brown	4	2008	Rice
	Kendrick Lee	3	1996	Houston
	Sherrod Gideon	3	1997	Memphis
	Sherrod Gideon	3	1998	Louisiana-Lafayette
	Todd Pinkston	3	1999	Louisiana-Lafayette
	Gerald Baptiste	3	2009	Houston
	Michael Thomas	3	2015	North Texas
	Allenzae Staggers	3	2016	Rice
	Quez Watkins	3	2018	Jackson State

== Total offense ==
Total offense is the sum of passing and rushing statistics. It does not include receiving or returns.

=== Total offense yards ===
Career
Rank	Player	Yards	Years
1	Austin Davis	12,267	2008 2009 2010 2011
2	Nick Mullens	11,779	2013 2014 2015 2016
3	Brett Favre	7,606	1987 1988 1989 1990
4	Dustin Almond	7,602	2002 2003 2004 2005
5	Jeff Kelly	7,113	1998 1999 2000 2001
6	Jack Abraham	7,092	2018 2019 2020
7	Lee Roberts	5,777	1995 1996 1997 1998
8	Reggie Collier	5,966	1979 1980 1981 1982
9	Damion Fletcher	5,305	2006 2007 2008 2009
10	Frank Gore Jr.	4,402	2020 2021 2022 2023

Single season
Rank	Player	Yards	Year
1	Nick Mullens	4,384	2015
2	Austin Davis	3,848	2011
3	Austin Davis	3,636	2008
4	Jack Abraham	3,573	2019
5	Austin Davis	3,555	2010
6	Braylon Braxton	3,269	2025
7	Nick Mullens	3,213	2016
8	Dustin Almond	2,763	2005
9	Jeff Kelly	2,645	2001
10	Brett Favre	2,563	1989

Single game
Rank	Player	Yards	Year	Opponent
1	Nick Mullens	599	2016	Rice
2	Jack Abraham	489	2019	Troy
3	Austin Davis	445	2008	Rice
4	Nick Mullens	439	2014	Middle Tennessee
5	Nick Mullens	422	2015	Nebraska
6	Arsenio Favor	416	2012	UTEP
7	Jeff Kelly	415	2001	Tulane
	Braylon Braxton	415	2025	Louisiana Tech
9	Jack Abraham	411	2019	North Texas
10	Martevious Young	404	2009	Houston
	Austin Davis	404	2010	Houston

=== Total touchdowns ===
Career
Rank	Player	TDs	Years
1	Austin Davis	108	2008 2009 2010 2011
2	Nick Mullens	96	2013 2014 2015 2016
3	Dustin Almond	64	2002 2003 2004 2005
4	Jeff Kelly	59	1998 1999 2000 2001
5	Brett Favre	53	1987 1988 1989 1990
6	Lee Roberts	52	1995 1996 1997 1998
7	Jack Abraham	48	2018 2019 2020
8	Damion Fletcher	45	2006 2007 2008 2009
9	Reggie Collier	42	1979 1980 1981 1982
10	Sammy Winder	39	1978 1979 1980 1981

Single season
Rank	Player	TDs	Year
1	Nick Mullens	41	2015
2	Austin Davis	34	2011
3	Austin Davis	32	2008
4	Austin Davis	30	2010
5	Nick Mullens	28	2016
6	Dustin Almond	25	2005
	Jack Abraham	25	2019
	Braylon Braxton	25	2025
9	Lee Roberts	24	1998
10	Jeff Kelly	22	1999

Single game
Rank	Player	TDs	Year	Opponent
1	Dustin Almond	6	2005	UCF
	Austin Davis	6	2008	UAB
	Austin Davis	6	2010	Houston
	Nick Mullens	6	2013	UAB

== Defense ==
Note: The 2014 Southern Miss Football Media Guide does not give a full top 10 for defensive statistics.

=== Interceptions ===
Career
Rank	Player	Ints	Years
1	Bubba Phillips	25	1947 1948 1949 1950
2	Ray Guy	18	1970 1971 1972
3	Patrick Surtain	16	1994 1995 1996 1997
4	Billy Devrow	15	1964 1965 1966
5	Kerry Valrie	14	1987 1988 1989 1990

Single season
Rank	Player	Ints	Year
1	Bubba Phillips	8	1949
	Billy Devrow	8	1965
	Ray Guy	8	1972
4	Frank Spruiell	7	1948
	Bubba Phillips	7	1948
	Steve Fore	7	1967

Single game
Rank	Player	Ints	Year	Opponent
1	Larry Ussery	4	1967	Louisiana Tech
2	George Sekul	3	1957	Houston
	David Odom	3	1979	Louisville
	Labarion Rankins	3	1992	East Carolina
	Etric Pruitt	3	2002	Army
	Josh Moten	3	2025	Arkansas State
	Kobi Albert	3	2026	Alcorn State

=== Tackles ===
Career
Rank	Player	Tackles	Years
1	Rod Davis	526	2000 2001 2002 2003
2	Clump Taylor	510	1976 1977 1978 1979
3	Onesimus Henry	438	1984 1985 1986 1987
	Sidney Coleman	438	1984 1985 1986 1987
5	Mike Dennery	431	1971 1972 1973

Single season
Rank	Player	Tackles	Year
1	Mike Dennery	185	1972
2	Ron Cheatham	177	1974
3	Rod Davis	168	2002
4	Rod Davis	164	2003
5	Michael Boley	151	2003

Single game
Rank	Player	Tackles	Year	Opponent
1	T.J. Slaughter	26	1999	Texas A&M
2	Rod Davis	22	2003	Cincinnati
3	Thad McDowell	21	1989	Louisiana-Lafayette
	William Kirksey	21	1989	Louisiana-Lafayette
	Leo Barnes	21	1999	Texas A&M
	Gerald McRath	21	2007	UCF

=== Sacks ===
Career
Rank	Player	Sacks	Years
1	Adalius Thomas	34.5	1996 1997 1998 1999
2	Michael Boley	28.0	2001 2002 2003 2004
	Cordarro Law	28.0	2008 2009 2010 2011
4	Cedric Scott	26.0	1997 1998 1999 2000
5	Jamie Collins	21.0	2009 2010 2011 2012

Single season
Rank	Player	Sacks	Year
1	Adalius Thomas	12.5	1998
2	Cedric Scott	12.0	2000
3	Michael Boley	11.0	2003
4	Rod Davis	10.5	2002
5	Chris Jackson	10.0	2012
	Jamie Collins	10.0	1983
	Dominic Quewon	10.0	2022

Single game
Rank	Player	Sacks	Year	Opponent
1	Chris Jackson	4.0	1983	Louisiana Tech
	Cedric Scott	4.0	2000	Houston
3	Chris Jackson	3.0	1983	Ole Miss
	Rod Reed	3.0	1988	Tulane
	Michael Tobias	3.0	1993	Pittsburgh
	Jeffrey Posey	3.0	1996	Tulane
	Roy Magee	3.0	2000	Houston
	Michael Boley	3.0	2003	East Carolina
	Tom Johnson	3.0	2005	UCF
	Jamie Collins	3.0	2012	UAB
	Daylen Gill	3.0	2022	Rice
	J'Mond Tapp	3.0	2025	App State

== Kicking ==
=== Field goals made ===
Career
Rank	Player	FGs	Years
1	Darren McCaleb	69	2003 2004 2005 2006
2	Danny Hrapmann	53	2009 2010 2011 2012
3	Parker Shaunfield	47	2015 2016 2017 2018
4	Corey Acosta	43	2011 2012 2013 2014
5	Steve Clark	41	1981 1982 1983
6	Briggs Bourgeois	40	2017 2018 2020 2021 2022
7	Rex Banks	37	1983 1984 1985 1986
8	Andrew Stein	35	2019 2022 2023 2024
9	Brant Hanna	33	1998 1999 2000 2001
10	Justin Estes	29	2007 2008 2009 2010

Single season
Rank	Player	FGs	Year
1	Danny Hrapmann	26	2010
2	Darren McCaleb	23	2005
	Danny Hrapmann	23	2011
4	Corey Acosta	19	2014
5	Andrew Stein	18	2019
	Briggs Bourgeois	18	2022
7	Steve Clark	17	1982
	Parker Shaunfield	17	2017
	Andrew Stein	17	2023
10	Steve Clark	16	1983
	Rex Banks	16	1984
	Darren McCaleb	16	2004
	Darren McCaleb	16	2006
	Parker Shaunfield	16	2018

Single game
Rank	Player	FGs	Year	Opponent
1	Danny Hrapmann	5	2010	East Carolina
	Danny Hrapmann	5	2011	UCF
3	Rex Banks	4	1984	Georgia
	Chris Seroka	4	1988	Memphis
	Darren McCaleb	4	2005	East Carolina
	Darren McCaleb	4	2005	Tulane
	Stephen Brauchle	4	2015	UTSA
	Andrew Stein	4	2023	Alcorn State

=== Field goal percentage ===
Career
Rank	Player	FG%	Years
1	Parker Shaunfield	79.7%	2015 2016 2017 2018
2	Briggs Bourgeois	78.4%	2017 2018 2020 2021 2022
3	Darren McCaleb	78.4%	2003 2004 2005 2006
4	Stephen Brauchle	77.8%	2015 2016
5	Danny Hrapmann	73.6%	2009 2010 2011 2012
6	Andrew Stein	72.9%	2019 2022 2023 2024
7	Chris Pierce	71.9%	1994 1995
	Tim Hardaway	71.9%	1997 1998
9	Connor Gibbs	71.4%	2023 2024
10	Lance Nations	69.2%	1991 1992

Single season
Rank	Player	FG%	Year
1	Briggs Bourgeois	94.7%	2022
2	Parker Shaunfield	85.7%	2016
3	Parker Shaunfield	85.0%	2017
4	Darren McCaleb	84.2%	2004
5	Danny Hrapmann	83.9%	2010
6	Chris Pierce	82.4%	1995
	Darren McCaleb	82.4%	2003
8	Darren McCaleb	82.1%	2005
9	Andrew Stein	81.8%	2019
10	Tim Hardaway	81.3%	1997
