= List of Southern Miss Golden Eagles in the NFL draft =

This is a List of Southern Miss Golden Eagles football players in the NFL draft.

== Key ==
| B | Back | K | Kicker | NT | Nose tackle |
| C | Center | LB | Linebacker | FB | Fullback |
| DB | Defensive back | P | Punter | HB | Halfback |
| DE | Defensive end | QB | Quarterback | WR | Wide receiver |
| DT | Defensive tackle | RB | Running back | G | Guard |
| E | End | T | Offensive tackle | TE | Tight end |

== Selections ==
| Year | Round | Pick | Overall | Player | Team | Position |
|---|---|---|---|---|---|---|
| 1942 | 12 | 5 | 105 | Joe Stringfellow | Detroit Lions | E |
| 1947 | 25 | 9 | 234 | Dick Thomas | New York Giants | G |
| 1948 | 5 | 10 | 35 | Jay Smith | Chicago Cardinals | E |
| 1948 | 10 | 3 | 78 | Mike Katrishen | Washington Redskins | T |
| 1948 | 15 | 5 | 130 | Bob Dement | Los Angeles Rams | T |
| 1948 | 23 | 10 | 215 | H. M. Reynolds | Chicago Cardinals | E |
| 1949 | 11 | 4 | 105 | Al Sanders | Pittsburgh Steelers | C |
| 1949 | 16 | 6 | 157 | Joe Morgan | Los Angeles Rams | G |
| 1950 | 7 | 11 | 90 | Cliff Coggin | Los Angeles Rams | E |
| 1951 | 19 | 1 | 220 | Bubba Phillips | San Francisco 49ers | B |
| 1952 | 26 | 7 | 308 | Bucky McElroy | Chicago Bears | B |
| 1952 | 28 | 12 | 337 | Granville Hart | Los Angeles Rams | B |
| 1952 | 30 | 2 | 351 | Jack Fulkerson | Green Bay Packers | T |
| 1953 | 7 | 2 | 75 | Bucky McElroy | Chicago Bears | B |
| 1953 | 19 | 7 | 224 | Hal Lehman | New York Giants | T |
| 1953 | 28 | 12 | 337 | Laurin Pepper | Detroit Lions | B |
| 1954 | 6 | 6 | 67 | Laurin Pepper | Pittsburgh Steelers | B |
| 1955 | 17 | 2 | 195 | Wes Clark | Baltimore Colts | T |
| 1955 | 20 | 4 | 233 | Carl Bolt | Green Bay Packers | B |
| 1956 | 16 | 3 | 184 | George Herring | San Francisco 49ers | QB |
| 1956 | 22 | 6 | 259 | Pat Del Vicaro | Baltimore Colts | G |
| 1956 | 29 | 5 | 342 | Bob Hughes | Philadelphia Eagles | B |
| 1957 | 3 | 5 | 30 | Don Owens | Pittsburgh Steelers | T |
| 1957 | 6 | 11 | 72 | Bo Dickinson | Chicago Bears | B |
| 1957 | 21 | 6 | 247 | Curry Juneau | Cleveland Browns | E |
| 1958 | 15 | 7 | 176 | Dick Johnston | Los Angeles Rams | C |
| 1958 | 16 | 7 | 188 | John Perkins | Pittsburgh Steelers | T |
| 1959 | 10 | 1 | 109 | Sam Tuccio | Green Bay Packers | T |
| 1959 | 26 | 12 | 312 | Rene Lorio | Baltimore Colts | B |
| 1960 | 3 | 2 | 26 | Hugh McInnis | St. Louis Cardinals | E |
| 1960 | 3 | 5 | 29 | Charley Elley | St. Louis Cardinals | C |
| 1961 | 7 | 8 | 92 | George Hultz | St. Louis Cardinals | T |
| 1961 | 11 | 12 | 152 | Val Keckin | Green Bay Packers | B |
| 1962 | 14 | 4 | 186 | Harold Hays | Dallas Cowboys | G |
| 1963 | 9 | 14 | 126 | Bill Freeman | Green Bay Packers | T |
| 1963 | 12 | 2 | 156 | John Sklopan | Minnesota Vikings | B |
| 1963 | 17 | 1 | 225 | Jerrel Wilson | Los Angeles Rams | P |
| 1964 | 13 | 8 | 176 | Charlie Parker | Baltimore Colts | T |
| 1964 | 16 | 4 | 214 | Tom Walters | Washington Redskins | B |
| 1966 | 12 | 9 | 179 | Ken Avery | New York Giants | LB |
| 1967 | 8 | 20 | 205 | Bill Devrow | Cleveland Browns | DB |
| 1968 | 2 | 11 | 38 | Tom Roussel | Washington Redskins | LB |
| 1968 | 6 | 23 | 161 | Bobby Webb | Los Angeles Rams | C |
| 1969 | 13 | 15 | 332 | Tommy Boutwell | Cleveland Browns | QB |
| 1969 | 17 | 14 | 430 | Hank Autry | Houston Oilers | C |
| 1973 | 1 | 23 | 23 | Ray Guy | Oakland Raiders | P |
| 1974 | 2 | 6 | 32 | Fred Cook | Baltimore Colts | DE |
| 1974 | 6 | 17 | 147 | Doyle Orange | Atlanta Falcons | RB |
| 1974 | 11 | 6 | 266 | Eugene Bird | New York Jets | DB |
| 1974 | 11 | 20 | 280 | Harvey McGee | Dallas Cowboys | WR |
| 1974 | 13 | 18 | 330 | Mike Dennery | Oakland Raiders | LB |
| 1975 | 11 | 11 | 271 | John Sawyer | Houston Oilers | TE |
| 1976 | 9 | 20 | 257 | Norris Thomas | Miami Dolphins | DB |
| 1976 | 13 | 8 | 355 | Bradley Bowman | Green Bay Packers | DB |
| 1977 | 11 | 20 | 299 | Carl Allen | Cincinnati Bengals | DB |
| 1977 | 12 | 23 | 330 | Barry Caudill | Los Angeles Rams | C |
| 1978 | 5 | 11 | 121 | Amos Fowler | Detroit Lions | G |
| 1978 | 6 | 7 | 145 | Eric Smith | Buffalo Bills | T |
| 1978 | 6 | 23 | 161 | Ben Garry | Baltimore Colts | RB |
| 1981 | 1 | 22 | 22 | Hanford Dixon | Cleveland Browns | DB |
| 1981 | 3 | 14 | 70 | Marvin Harvey | Kansas City Chiefs | TE |
| 1981 | 12 | 7 | 311 | Cliff Lewis | Green Bay Packers | LB |
| 1982 | 5 | 20 | 131 | Sammy Winder | Denver Broncos | RB |
| 1982 | 10 | 4 | 255 | Ricky Floyd | Cleveland Browns | RB |
| 1983 | 6 | 22 | 162 | Reggie Collier | Dallas Cowboys | QB |
| 1984 | 1 | 23 | 23 | Louis Lipps | Pittsburgh Steelers | WR |
| 1984 | 8 | 14 | 210 | Clemon Terrell | New Orleans Saints | RB |
| 1984 | 9 | 9 | 233 | Glen Howe | Atlanta Falcons | T |
| 1984 | 11 | 26 | 306 | Bud Brown | Miami Dolphins | DB |
| 1985 | 2 | 8 | 36 | Richard Byrd | Houston Oilers | DE |
| 1986 | 8 | 21 | 215 | Robert Ducksworth | New York Jets | DB |
| 1988 | 5 | 20 | 129 | John Baylor | Indianapolis Colts | DB |
| 1989 | 4 | 19 | 103 | James Henry | Seattle Seahawks | DB |
| 1990 | 9 | 20 | 240 | Eugene Rowell | Cleveland Browns | WR |
| 1990 | 11 | 9 | 285 | Reginald Warnsley | Detroit Lions | RB |
| 1991 | 2 | 6 | 33 | Brett Favre | Atlanta Falcons | QB |
| 1991 | 6 | 2 | 141 | Michael Jackson | Cleveland Browns | WR |
| 1991 | 7 | 28 | 195 | Simmie Carter | New York Giants | DB |
| 1992 | 1 | 19 | 19 | Tony Smith | Atlanta Falcons | RB |
| 1992 | 5 | 16 | 128 | Derrick Hoskins | Los Angeles Raiders | DB |
| 1992 | 5 | 24 | 136 | Tim Roberts | Houston Oilers | DT |
| 1994 | 4 | 4 | 107 | Perry Carter | Arizona Cardinals | DB |
| 1998 | 2 | 14 | 44 | Patrick Surtain | Miami Dolphins | DB |
| 1998 | 5 | 2 | 125 | Terry Hardy | Arizona Cardinals | TE |
| 1998 | 6 | 23 | 176 | Harold Shaw | New England Patriots | RB |
| 1998 | 6 | 32 | 185 | Jamaal Alexander | Detroit Lions | DB |
| 2000 | 2 | 5 | 36 | Todd Pinkston | Philadelphia Eagles | WR |
| 2000 | 3 | 30 | 92 | T. J. Slaughter | Jacksonville Jaguars | LB |
| 2000 | 6 | 20 | 186 | Adalius Thomas | Baltimore Ravens | DE |
| 2000 | 6 | 34 | 200 | Sherrod Gideon | New Orleans Saints | WR |
| 2001 | 4 | 19 | 114 | Cedric Scott | New York Giants | DE |
| 2001 | 5 | 21 | 152 | Raymond Walls | Indianapolis Colts | DB |
| 2001 | 6 | 8 | 171 | Daleroy Stewart | Dallas Cowboys | DT |
| 2001 | 7 | 40 | 240 | John Nix | Dallas Cowboys | DT |
| 2002 | 6 | 37 | 209 | Chad Williams | Baltimore Ravens | DB |
| 2002 | 7 | 21 | 232 | Jeff Kelly | Seattle Seahawks | QB |
| 2003 | 6 | 12 | 185 | Jeremy Bridges | Philadelphia Eagles | G |
| 2004 | 5 | 23 | 155 | Rod Davis | Minnesota Vikings | LB |
| 2004 | 6 | 18 | 183 | Greg Brooks | Cincinnati Bengals | DB |
| 2004 | 6 | 21 | 186 | Etric Pruitt | Atlanta Falcons | DB |
| 2005 | 5 | 24 | 160 | Michael Boley | Atlanta Falcons | LB |
| 2005 | 7 | 24 | 238 | Jeremy Parquet | Kansas City Chiefs | T |
| 2008 | 6 | 33 | 199 | Robert Henderson | New York Giants | DE |
| 2009 | 4 | 21 | 121 | Shawn Nelson | Buffalo Bills | TE |
| 2009 | 4 | 30 | 130 | Gerald McRath | Tennessee Titans | LB |
| 2012 | 3 | 28 | 91 | Lamar Holmes | Atlanta Falcons | T |
| 2013 | 2 | 20 | 52 | Jamie Collins | New England Patriots | LB |
| 2014 | 3 | 21 | 85 | Khyri Thornton | Green Bay Packers | DT |
| 2015 | 6 | 41 | 217 | Rakeem Nunez-Roches | Kansas City Chiefs | DT |
| 2016 | 6 | 31 | 206 | Mike Thomas | Los Angeles Rams | WR |
| 2016 | 7 | 32 | 253 | Kalan Reed | Tennessee Titans | DB |
| 2018 | 3 | 31 | 95 | Tarvarius Moore | San Francisco 49ers | DB |
| 2018 | 4 | 26 | 126 | Ito Smith | Atlanta Falcons | RB |
| 2018 | 6 | 35 | 209 | Cornell Armstrong | Kansas City Chiefs | DB |
| 2020 | 6 | 21 | 200 | Quez Watkins | Philadelphia Eagles | WR |
| 2023 | 6 | 1 | 178 | Eric Scott Jr. | Dallas Cowboys | DB |

== Notable undrafted players ==
Note: No drafts held before 1920

| Debut year | Player name | Position | Debut NFL/AFL team | Notes |
|---|---|---|---|---|
| 1974 | Terry Wells | RB | Houston Oilers | |
| 1984 | Larry Mason | RB | Cleveland Browns | |
| 1987 | Vincent Alexander | RB | New Orleans Saints | |
| 1987 | Lyneal Alston | WR | Pittsburgh Steelers | |
| 1988 | Sidney Coleman | LB | Tampa Bay Buccaneers | |
| 1994 | Bobby Hamilton | DE | Seattle Seahawks | |
| 1996 | Fred Brock | WR | Arizona Cardinals | |
| 1997 | Jeff Posey | LB | San Diego Chargers | |
| 1998 | Perry Phenix | S | Tennessee Oilers | |
| 2001 | DeQuincy Scott | DT | San Diego Chargers | |
| 2003 | Torrin Tucker | G | Dallas Cowboys | |
| 2005 | Antoine Cash | LB | Atlanta Falcons | |
| 2006 | Tom Johnson | DT | Indianapolis Colts | |
| 2011 | DeAndre Brown | WR | Philadelphia Eagles | |
| 2012 | Austin Davis | QB | St. Louis Rams | |
| 2017 | Nick Mullens | QB | San Francisco 49ers | |
| 2017 | Cameron Tom | C | New Orleans Saints | |
| 2020 | DeMichael Harris | WR | Indianapolis Colts | |
| 2021 | Tim Jones | WR | Jacksonville Jaguars | |
| 2023 | Natrone Brooks | CB | Atlanta Falcons | |
| 2023 | Jason Brownlee | WR | New York Jets | |
| 2023 | Tykeem Doss | G | Baltimore Ravens | |
| 2024 | Swayze Bozeman | LB | Kansas City Chiefs | |
| 2024 | Frank Gore Jr. | RB | Buffalo Bills | |
| 2024 | Latreal Jones | WR | Tampa Bay Buccaneers | |
| 2024 | Briasan Mays | OL | San Francisco 49ers | |
| 2025 | Demeco Roland | DL | Seattle Seahawks | |
