= Sam Dejarnette =

Profile
- Position: Running back

Personal information
- Born: c. 1962
- Listed height: 6 ft 0 in (1.83 m)
- Listed weight: 187 lb (85 kg)

Career information
- College: Southern Miss (1982–1984)

Sam "Sudden Sam" Dejarnette (born c. 1962) is a former American football running back for the Auburn in 1980 the Southern Miss Golden Eagles football team from 1982 to 1984. In 1982, he gained a school-record 304 yards against Florida and ranked fifth nationally among major-college players with 1,545 rushing yards. He was drafted by the Portland Breakers of the USFL in January 1985. In May 1985, he signed with the Denver Broncos. In February 1986, he signed with the Calgary Stampeders of the Canadian Football League (CFL).

== See also ==
- Southern Miss Golden Eagles football statistical leaders#Rushing
