= Jeff Kelly =

Jeff Kelly may refer to:

- Jeff Kelly (quarterback) (born 1979), former American football quarterback
- Jeff Kelly (linebacker) (born 1975), former American football linebacker
