= 2010 Conference USA football season =

- League: NCAA Division I Football Bowl Subdivision
- Sport: Football
- Duration: September 2, 2010 through December 31, 2010
- Teams: 12
- TV partner(s): ESPN, CBS College Sports, CSS, Bright House Sports Network, CST, MASN, ISP Sports

2011 NFL Draft
- Top draft pick: OT Jah Reid, UCF
- Picked by: Baltimore Ravens, 85th overall

Regular Season
- Season MVP: WR/KR Dwayne Harris, ECU
- East champions: UCF
- West champions: SMU & Tulsa (co-champions)

Championship Game
- Champions: UCF
- Runners-up: SMU
- Finals MVP: RB Latavius Murray, UCF

Football seasons
- 2009 2011

2010 Conference USA football standings
	Conf.			Overall
Team	W		L	W		L
East Division
No. 21 UCF x$	7	–	1	11	–	3
East Carolina	5	–	3	6	–	7
Southern Miss	5	–	3	8	–	5
Marshall	4	–	4	5	–	7
UAB	3	–	5	4	–	8
Memphis	0	–	8	1	–	11
West Division
SMU xy	6	–	2	7	–	7
No. 24 Tulsa x	6	–	2	10	–	3
Houston	4	–	4	5	–	7
UTEP	3	–	5	6	–	7
Rice	3	–	5	4	–	8
Tulane	2	–	6	4	–	8
Championship: UCF 17, SMU 7
$ – Conference champion; x – Division champion/co-champions; y – Championship game participant; As of January 11, 2011; Rankings from AP Poll

The 2010 Conference USA football season was an NCAA football season played from September 2, 2010, through December 31, 2010. Conference USA consists of 12 football members separated into 2 divisions: East Carolina, Marshall, Memphis, Southern Miss, UAB, and UCF make up the eastern division, while Houston, Rice, SMU, Tulane, Tulsa, and UTEP comprise the western division.

This was the 15th football season and 16th overall for Conference USA. Although C-USA was founded in 1995, it did not start football competition until 1996.

== Preseason ==
=== Coaching changes ===
- Ruffin McNeil replaced Skip Holtz at East Carolina.
- Doc Holliday replaced Mark Snyder at Marshall.

=== Preseason polls ===
No Conference USA teams were ranked though both SMU and UCF each received one vote. Houston received 66 points in the AP Poll, and 76 points in the Coaches' Poll.

== Regular season ==
Index to colors and formatting
Conference USA member won
Conference USA member lost
Conference USA teams in **bold**
Rankings from Coaches' Poll

=== Week One ===
Date	Time (EDT)	Visiting team	Home team	Site	TV	Result	Attendance
September 2	6:30 p.m.	**Southern Miss**	South Carolina	Williams-Brice Stadium • Columbia, South Carolina	ESPN	**L** 41-13	70,438
September 2	7:00 p.m.	Southeastern Louisiana	**Tulane**	Louisiana Superdome • New Orleans	–	**W** 27-21	20,258
September 2	7:00 p.m.	Florida Atlantic	**UAB**	Legion Field • Birmingham, Alabama	ESPN	**L** 32-31	25,885
September 2	7:30 p.m.	**Marshall**	#2 Ohio State	Ohio Stadium • Columbus, Ohio	BTN	**L** 45-7	105,040
September 4	2:30 p.m.	#4 Texas	**Rice**	Reliant Stadium • Houston, Texas	ESPN	**L** 34-17	70,445
September 4	6:00 p.m.	**Memphis**	Mississippi State	Davis Wade Stadium • Starkville, Mississippi	-	**L** 49-7	56,032
September 4	6:00 p.m.	South Dakota	**UCF**	Bright House Networks Stadium • Orlando, Florida	-	**W** 38-7	34,373
September 4	7:00 p.m.	Texas State	**Houston**	Robertson Stadium • Houston	-	**W** 68-28	32,119
September 4	7:00 p.m.	Arkansas Pine Bluff	**UTEP**	Sun Bowl Stadium • El Paso, Texas	–	**W** 32-10	30,029
September 5	2:00 p.m.	**Tulsa**	**East Carolina**	Dowdy–Ficklen Stadium • Greenville, North Carolina	ESPN2	**ECU** 51-49	50,010
September 5	3:30 p.m.	**SMU**	Texas Tech	Jones AT&T Stadium • Lubbock, Texas	ESPN	**L** 35-27	57,528

=== Week Two ===
Date	Time (EDT)	Visiting team	Home team	Site	TV	Result	Attendance
September 10	7:00 p.m.	#22 West Virginia	**Marshall**	Edwards Stadium • Huntington, West Virginia	ESPN	**L** 24-21 OT	41,382
September 10	10:15 p.m.	**UTEP**	**Houston**	Robertson Stadium • Houston	ESPN	**HOU** 54-24	32,119
September 11	12:00 p.m.	**Memphis**	**East Carolina**	Dowdy–Ficklen Stadium • Greenville, North Carolina		**ECU** 49-27	48,123
September 11	7:00 p.m.	Bowling Green	**Tulsa**	Chapman Stadium • Tulsa, Oklahoma		**W** 33-20	19,565
September 11	7:00 p.m.	**Rice**	North Texas	Fouts Field • Denton, Texas		**W** 32-31	23,743
September 11	7:00 p.m.	Prairie View A&M	**Southern Miss**	M.M. Roberts Stadium • Hattiesburg, Mississippi		**W** 34-7	27,316
September 11	7:30 p.m.	NC State	**UCF**	Bright House Networks Stadium • Orlando, Florida	CBS CS	**L** 28-21	43,020
September 11	8:00 p.m.	**UAB**	**SMU**	Gerald J. Ford Stadium • Dallas, Texas		**SMU** 28-7	16,612
September 11	9:00 p.m.	Mississippi	**Tulane**	Superdome • New Orleans, Louisiana	ESPN2	**L** 27-13	36,389

=== Week Three ===
Date	Time (EDT)	Visiting team	Home team	Site	TV	Result	Attendance
September 17	8:00 p.m.	Kansas	**Southern Miss**	M.M. Roberts Stadium • Hattiesburg, Mississippi	ESPN	**W** 31-16	30,211
September 18	1:30 p.m.	**East Carolina**	Virginia Tech	Lane Stadium • Blacksburg, Virginia		**L** 49-27	66,233
September 18	3:30 p.m.	Washington State	**SMU**	Gerald J. Ford Stadium • Dallas, Texas		**W** 35-21	18,184
September 18	3:30 p.m.	Troy	**UAB**	Legion Field • Birmingham, Alabama		**W** 34-33	23,681
September 18	7:00 p.m.	**Marshall**	Bowling Green	Doyt Perry Stadium • Bowling Green, Ohio		**L** 44-28	20,515
September 18	7:00 p.m.	**Tulsa**	Oklahoma State	Boone Pickens Stadium • Stillwater, Oklahoma		**L** 65-28	51,778
September 18	7:00 p.m.	Middle Tennessee	**Memphis**	Liberty Bowl Memorial Stadium • Memphis, Tennessee		**W** 24-17	27,965
September 18	7:00 p.m.	Northwestern	**Rice**	Rice Stadium • Houston, Texas		**L** 30-13	15,562
September 18	7:00 p.m.	**UCF**	Buffalo	University at Buffalo Stadium • Amherst, New York		**W** 24-10	14,312
September 18	9:05 p.m.	New Mexico State	**UTEP**	Aggie Memorial Stadium • Las Cruces, New Mexico		**W** 42-10	39,214
September 18	10:30 p.m.	#23 **Houston**	UCLA	Rose Bowl • Pasadena, California		**L** 31-13	54,407

=== Week Four ===
Date	Time (EDT)	Visiting team	Home team	Site	TV	Result	Attendance
September 24	8:00 p.m.	#5 TCU	**SMU**	Gerald J. Ford Stadium • Dallas	ESPN	**L** 41-24	35,481
September 25	12:21 p.m.	**UAB**	Tennessee	Neyland Stadium • Knoxville, Tennessee	SEC Network	**L** 32-29	95,183
September 25	12:30 p.m.	**UCF**	Kansas State	Bill Snyder Stadium • Manhattan, Kansas	FSN	**L** 17-13	50,586
September 25	3:30 p.m.	**Tulane**	**Houston**	Robertson Stadium • Houston		**HOU** 42-23	32,007
September 25	7:00 p.m.	Central Arkansas	**Tulsa**	Chapman Stadium • Tulsa, Oklahoma		**W** 41-14	21,928
September 25	7:00 p.m.	Ohio	**Marshall**	Edwards Stadium • Huntington, West Virginia		**W** 24-23	28,143
September 25	7:00 p.m.	**Southern Miss**	Louisiana Tech	Joe Aillet Stadium • Ruston, Louisiana		**W** 13-12	22,344
September 25	8:00 p.m.	Baylor	**Rice**	Rice Stadium • Houston, Texas	CBS CS	**L** 30-13	23,395
September 25	9:05 p.m.	**Memphis**	**UTEP**	Sun Bowl • El Paso, Texas		**UTEP** 16-13	29,765

=== Week Five ===
Date	Time (EDT)	Visiting team	Home team	Site	TV	Result	Attendance
October 2	2:00 p.m.	Tulane	Rutgers	Rutgers Stadium • Piscataway, New Jersey		**W** 17-14	47,963
October 2	3:30 p.m.	East Carolina	North Carolina	Kenan Memorial Stadium • Chapel Hill, North Carolina		**L** 42-17	60,000
October 2	6:00 p.m.	UTEP	New Mexico	University Stadium • Albuquerque, New Mexico		**W** 38-20	22,511
October 2	7:00 p.m.	Tulsa	**Memphis**	Liberty Bowl Memorial Stadium • Memphis, Tennessee		**TLSA** 48-7	22,231
October 2	7:00 p.m.	SMU	**Rice**	Rice Stadium • Houston		**SMU** 42-31	14,981
October 2	8:00 p.m.	Marshall	**Southern Miss**	M. M. Roberts Stadium • Hattiesburg, Mississippi	CBS CS	**SM** 41-16	27,518

=== Week Six ===
Date	Time (EDT)	Visiting team	Home team	Site	TV	Result	Attendance
October 6	8:00 p.m.	**UAB**	**UCF**	Bright House Networks Stadium • Orlando, Florida	ESPN	**UCF** 42-7	40,281
October 9	2:00 p.m.	**Memphis**	Louisville	Papa John's Cardinal Stadium • Louisville, Kentucky		**L** 56-0	48,427
October 9	3:30 p.m.	Army	**Tulane**	Superdome • New Orleans		**L** 41-23	28,756
October 9	7:30 p.m.	**East Carolina**	**Southern Miss**	M. M. Roberts Stadium • Hattiesburg, Mississippi	CSS	**ECU** 44-43	32,334
October 9	8:00 p.m.	Mississippi State	**Houston**	Robertson Stadium • Houston, Texas	CBS CS	**L** 47-24	32,067
October 9	8:00 p.m.	**Tulsa**	**SMU**	Gerald J. Ford Stadium • Dallas		**SMU** 21-18	19,329
October 9	9:05 p.m.	**Rice**	**UTEP**	Sun Bowl • El Paso, Texas		**UTEP** 44-24	28,955

=== Week Seven ===
Date	Time (EDT)	Visiting team	Home team	Site	TV	Result	Attendance
October 13	8:00 p.m.	**UCF**	**Marshall**	Edwards Stadium • Huntington, West Virginia	ESPN	**UCF** 35-14	23,601
October 16	12:00 p.m.	NC State	**East Carolina**	Dowdy–Ficklen Stadium • Greenville, North Carolina		**W** 33-27 OT	50,410
October 16	12:00 p.m.	**Southern Miss**	**Memphis**	Liberty Bowl Memorial Stadium • Memphis, Tennessee		**SM** 41-19	18,848
October 16	3:30 p.m.	**Houston**	**Rice**	Rice Stadium • Houston		**RICE** 34-31	26,342
October 16	3:30 p.m.	**SMU**	Navy	Navy–Marine Corps Memorial Stadium • Annapolis, Maryland		**L** 28-21	33,924
October 16	4:00 p.m.	**UTEP**	**UAB**	Legion Field • Birmingham, Alabama		**UAB** 21-6	11,756
October 16	7:00 p.m.	**Tulane**	**Tulsa**	Chapman Stadium • Tulsa, Oklahoma		**TLSA** 52-24	23,295

=== Week Eight ===
Date	Time (EDT)	Visiting team	Home team	Site	TV	Result	Attendance
October 23	3:30 p.m.	**Rice**	**UCF**	Bright House Networks Stadium • Orlando, Florida		**UCF** 41-14	38,151
October 23	3:30 p.m.	**Houston**	**SMU**	Gerald J. Ford Stadium • Dallas	CBSCS	**HOU** 45-20	20,741
October 23	4:15 p.m.	**Marshall**	**East Carolina**	Dowdy–Ficklen Stadium • Greenville, North Carolina	CSS	**ECU** 37-10	50,145
October 23	7:00 p.m.	**UAB**	#24 Mississippi State	Davis Wade Stadium • Starkville, Mississippi	ESPNU	**L** 29-24	56,423
October 23	9:05 p.m.	**Tulane**	**UTEP**	Sun Bowl Stadium • El Paso, Texas		**TULN** 34-24	25,007

=== Week Nine ===
Date	Time (EDT)	Visiting team	Home team	Site	TV	Result	Attendance
October 30	12:00 p.m.	UAB	**Southern Miss**	M. M. Roberts Stadium • Hattiesburg, Mississippi	CSS	**UAB** 50-49	26,415
October 30	2:30 p.m.	Tulsa	Notre Dame	Notre Dame Stadium • Notre Dame, Indiana	NBC	**W** 28-27	80,795
October 30	3:00 p.m.	UTEP	**Marshall**	Joan C. Edwards Stadium • Huntington, West Virginia		**MRSH** 16-12	24,740
October 30	3:30 p.m.	East Carolina	**UCF**	Bright House Networks Stadium • Orlando, Florida	MASN	**UCF** 49-35	40,073
October 30	3:30 p.m.	SMU	**Tulane**	Louisiana Superdome • New Orleans		**SMU** 31-17	18,636
October 30	7:00 p.m.	Houston	**Memphis**	Liberty Bowl Memorial Stadium • Memphis, Tennessee	CSS	**HOU** 56-17	19,731

=== Week Ten ===
Date	Time (EDT)	Visiting team	Home team	Site	TV	Result	Attendance
November 5	8:00 p.m.	**UCF**	Houston	Robertson Stadium • Houston	ESPN2	**UCF** 40-33	32,008
November 6	2:00 p.m.	**Rice**	Tulsa	Chapman Stadium • Tulsa, Oklahoma		**TLSA** 64-27	19,036
November 6	3:30 p.m.	Navy	East Carolina	Dowdy–Ficklen Stadium • Greenville, North Carolina	MASN	**L** 76-35	50,191
November 6	3:30 p.m.	**Southern Miss**	Tulane	Louisiana Superdome • New Orleans		**SM** 46-30	22,737
November 6	4:15 p.m.	**Marshall**	UAB	Legion Field • Birmingham, Alabama	CSS	**MRSH** 31-17	17,860
November 6	8:00 p.m.	Tennessee	Memphis	Liberty Bowl Memorial Stadium • Memphis, Tennessee	CBSCS	**L** 50-14	39,742
November 6	9:05 p.m.	**SMU**	UTEP	Sun Bowl • El Paso, Texas		**UTEP** 28-14	23,127

=== Week Eleven ===
Date	Time (EST)	Visiting team	Home team	Site	TV	Result	Attendance
November 11	8:00 p.m.	East Carolina	**UAB**	Legion Field • Birmingham, Alabama	CBSCS	**ECU** 54-42	14,083
November 13	12:00 p.m.	Southern Miss	#23 **UCF**	Bright House Networks Stadium • Orlando, Florida	CBSCS	**SM** 31-21	40,358
November 13	3:00 p.m.	Memphis	**Marshall**	Edwards Stadium • Huntington, West Virginia		**MRSH** 28-13	25,108
November 13	3:30 p.m.	Rice	**Tulane**	Louisiana Superdome • New Orleans		**TULN** 54-49	16,698
November 13	7:00 p.m.	UTEP	#14 Arkansas	Razorback Stadium • Fayetteville, Arkansas	ESPNU	**L** 58-21	67,330
November 13	8:00 p.m.	Tulsa	**Houston**	Robertson Stadium • Houston	CBSCS	**TLSA** 28-25	30,046

=== Week Twelve ===
Date	Time (EST)	Visiting team	Home team	Site	TV	Result	Attendance
November 20	1:00 p.m.	East Carolina	Rice	Rice Stadium • Houston, Texas	CSS	**RICE** 62-38	15,262
November 20	2:00 p.m.	UTEP	Tulsa	Chapman Stadium • Tulsa, Oklahoma		**TLSA** 31-28	16,547
November 20	3:00 p.m.	Marshall	SMU	Gerald J. Ford Stadium • Dallas		**SMU** 31-17	17,513
November 20	3:30 p.m.	UCF	Tulane	Louisiana Superdome • New Orleans		**UCF** 61-14	19,069
November 20	4:00 p.m.	Memphis	UAB	Legion Field • Birmingham, Alabama		**UAB** 31-15	16,177
November 20	6:00 p.m.	Houston	Southern Miss	M. M. Roberts Stadium • Hattiesburg, Mississippi		**SM** 59-41	32,606

=== Week Thirteen ===
Date	Time (EST)	Visiting team	Home team	Site	TV	Result	Attendance
November 26	2:00 p.m.	SMU	**East Carolina**	Dowdy–Ficklen Stadium • Greenville, North Carolina	CBSCS	**SMU** 45-38	49,108
November 26	6:30 p.m.	Southern Miss	**Tulsa**	Chapman Stadium • Tulsa, Oklahoma	CBSCS	**TLSA** 56-50	21,901
November 27	12:00 p.m.	UCF	**Memphis**	Liberty Bowl Stadium • Memphis, Tennessee	CSS	**UCF** 37-10	14,992
November 27	12:00 p.m.	Tulane	**Marshall**	Joan C. Edwards Stadium • Huntington, West Virginia	CBSCS	**MRSH** 38-23	19,302
November 27	3:30 p.m.	UAB	**Rice**	Rice Stadium • Houston	CSS	**RICE** 28-23	13,007
November 27	8:00 p.m.	Houston	Texas Tech	Jones AT&T Stadium • Lubbock, Texas	FSS	**L** 35-20	53,461

=== Week Fourteen- C-USA Championship Game ===
Date	Time (EST)	Visiting team	Home team	Site	TV	Result	Attendance
December 4	12:00 p.m.	**SMU**	#25 **UCF**	Bright House Networks Stadium • Orlando, Florida	ESPN2	**UCF** 17-7	41,045

== Players of the week ==
Week	Offensive		Defensive		Special teams	
Week	Player	Team	Player	Team	Player	Team
1 – Sep. 6	Dominique Davis, QB	East Carolina	Trent Mackey, LB	Tulane	Matt Szymanski, P	SMU
2 – Sep. 13	Bryce Beall, RB	Houston	Vinny Curry, DE	Marshall	Kevin Fitzpatrick, K	Tulsa
3 – Sep. 20	Bryan Ellis, QB	UAB	Darius Nall, DE	UCF	Tom Hornsey, P Deron Wilson, DB	Memphis; Southern Miss
4 – Sep. 27	Bryan Ellis, QB	UAB	Loyce Means, DB	Houston	Dakota Warren, K	UTEP
5 – Oct. 4	Kyle Padron, QB	SMU	Dezman Moses, DE	Tulane	Jonathan Ginsburgh, P	Tulane
6 – Oct. 11	Kris Adams, WR	UTEP	Kemal Ishmael, S	UCF	Danny Hrapmann, K	Southern Miss
7 – Oct. 18	Dominique Davis, QB	East Carolina	Jamon Hughes, LB	Memphis	Kyle Martens, P	Rice
8 – Oct. 25	Casey Robottom, WR	Tulane	Sammy Brown, LB; Darius Nall, DE	Houston; UCF	Tyron Carrier, KR	Houston
9 – Nov. 1	Pat Shed, RB; Ronnie Weaver, RB	UAB; UCF	Shawn Jackson, LB	Tulsa	Damaris Johnson, PR	Tulsa
10 – Nov. 8	Jeffrey Godfrey, QB	UCF	Josh Linam, LB	UCF	Damaris Johnson, KR	Tulsa
11 – Nov. 15	G.J. Kinne, QB	Tulsa	Marco Nelson, DB	Tulsa	Charles Ross, KR	Rice
12 – Nov. 22	Austin Davis, QB	Southern Miss	Richard Crawford, DB	SMU	Quincy McDuffie, KR	UCF

== Rankings ==
Legend
	Improvement in ranking
	Drop in ranking
	Not ranked previous week
RV	Received votes but were not ranked in Top 25 of poll

Ranking Movement
		Pre	Wk 1	Wk 2	Wk 3	Wk 4	Wk 5	Wk 6	Wk 7	Wk 8	Wk 9	Wk 10	Wk 11	Wk 12	Wk 13	Wk 14	Final
East Carolina Pirates	AP	-	RV	RV	-	-	-	-	RV	RV	-	-	-	-	-	-	-
East Carolina Pirates	C	-	-	RV	-	-	-	-	RV	RV	-	-	-	-	-	-	-
East Carolina Pirates	HAR	Not released						-	RV	RV	-	-	-	-	-	-	
East Carolina Pirates	BCS	Not released							RV	RV	-	-	-	-	-	-	
Houston Cougars	AP	RV	RV	23	RV	RV	-	-	-	-	-	-	-	-	-	-	-
Houston Cougars	C	RV	RV	23	RV	RV	RV	-	-	-	-	-	-	-	-	-	-
Houston Cougars	HAR	Not released						-	-	-	-	-	-	-	-	-	
Houston Cougars	BCS	Not released							-	-	-	-	-	-	-	-	
Marshall Thundering Herd	AP	-	-	-	-	-	-	-	-	-	-	-	-	-	-	-	-
Marshall Thundering Herd	C	-	-	-	-	-	-	-	-	-	-	-	-	-	-	-	-
Marshall Thundering Herd	HAR	Not released						-	-	-	-	-	-	-	-	-	
Marshall Thundering Herd	BCS	Not released							-	-	-	-	-	-	-	-	
Memphis Tigers	AP	-	-	-	-	-	-	-	-	-	-	-	-	-	-	-	-
Memphis Tigers	C	-	-	-	-	-	-	-	-	-	-	-	-	-	-	-	-
Memphis Tigers	HAR	Not released						-	-	-	-	-	-	-	-	-	
Memphis Tigers	BCS	Not released							-	-	-	-	-	-	-	-	
Rice Owls	AP	-	-	-	-	-	-	-	-	-	-	-	-	-	-	-	-
Rice Owls	C	-	-	-	-	-	-	-	-	-	-	-	-	-	-	-	-
Rice Owls	HAR	Not released						-	-	-	-	-	-	-	-	-	
Rice Owls	BCS	Not released							-	-	-	-	-	-	-	-	
Southern Miss Golden Eagles	AP	-	-	-	-	-	-	-	-	-	-	-	-	RV	-	-	-
Southern Miss Golden Eagles	C	-	-	-	-	-	-	-	-	-	-	RV	RV	RV	-	-	-
Southern Miss Golden Eagles	HAR	Not released						-	RV	-	-	-	RV	RV	-	-	
Southern Miss Golden Eagles	BCS	Not released							RV	RV	-	RV	RV	RV	-	-	
SMU Mustangs	AP	RV	-	-	-	-	-	-	-	-	-	-	-	-	-	-	-
SMU Mustangs	C	RV	-	-	-	-	-	-	-	-	-	-	-	-	-	-	-
SMU Mustangs	HAR	Not released						-	-	-	-	-	-	-	-	-	
SMU Mustangs	BCS	Not released							-	-	-	-	-	-	-	-	
Tulane Green Wave	AP	-	-	-	-	-	-	-	-	-	-	-	-	-	-	-	-
Tulane Green Wave	C	-	-	-	-	-	-	-	-	-	-	-	-	-	-	-	-
Tulane Green Wave	HAR	Not released						-	-	-	-	-	-	-	-	-	
Tulane Green Wave	BCS	Not released							-	-	-	-	-	-	-	-	
Tulsa Golden Hurricane	AP	-	-	-	-	-	-	-	-	-	-	-	RV	RV	RV	RV	24
Tulsa Golden Hurricane	C	-	-	-	-	-	-	-	-	-	-	-	-	RV	RV	RV	RV
Tulsa Golden Hurricane	HAR	Not released						-	-	-	-	RV	RV	RV	RV	RV	
Tulsa Golden Hurricane	BCS	Not released							-	-	-	RV	RV	RV	RV	RV	
UAB Blazers	AP	-	-	-	-	-	-	-	-	-	-	-	-	-	-	-	-
UAB Blazers	C	-	-	-	-	-	-	-	-	-	-	-	-	-	-	-	-
UAB Blazers	HAR	Not released						-	-	-	-	-	-	-	-	-	
UAB Blazers	BCS	Not released							-	-	-	-	-	-	-	-	
UCF Knights	AP	RV	-	-	-	-	-	-	-	-	RV	25	-	RV	RV	RV	21
UCF Knights	C	-	-	-	-	-	-	-	-	RV	RV	23	RV	RV	25	24	20
UCF Knights	HAR	Not released						-	-	RV	RV	25	RV	RV	RV	25	
UCF Knights	BCS	Not released							-	RV	RV	RV	RV	RV	RV	25	
UTEP Miners	AP	-	-	-	-	-	-	-	-	-	-	-	-	-	-	-	-
UTEP Miners	C	-	-	-	-	-	-	-	-	-	-	-	-	-	-	-	-
UTEP Miners	HAR	Not released						RV	-	-	-	-	-	-	-	-	
UTEP Miners	BCS	Not released							-	-	-	-	-	-	-	-	

== Records against other conferences ==
Conference	Wins	Losses
ACC	1	3
Big 12	1	6
Big East	1	2
Big Ten	0	2
Independents	1	3
MAC	3	1
Mountain West	1	1
Pac-10	1	1
SEC	0	8
Sun Belt	3	1
WAC	2	0
All FCS	6	0
Overall	20	28

== Bowl games ==
=== Bowl eligibility ===
==== Bowl eligible (6) ====
- UCF (9–3) became bowl eligible on October 30 after defeating East Carolina.
- Southern Miss (8–4) became bowl eligible on November 6 after defeating Tulane.
- Tulsa (9–3) became bowl eligible on November 6 after defeating Rice.
- East Carolina (6–6) became bowl eligible on November 11 after defeating UAB.
- UTEP (6–6) became bowl eligible on November 13 after defeating SMU.
- SMU (7–5) became bowl eligible on November 20 after defeating Marshall.

==== Bowl ineligible (6) ====
- Memphis (1–11) lost the ability to become bowl eligible on October 30 after losing to Houston.
- Rice (4–8) lost the ability to become bowl eligible on November 6 after losing to Tulsa.
- UAB (4–8) lost the ability to become bowl eligible on November 11 after losing to East Carolina.
- Marshall (5–7) lost the ability to become bowl eligible on November 20 after losing to SMU.
- Tulane (4–8) lost the ability to become bowl eligible on November 20 after losing to UCF.
- Houston (5–7) lost the ability to become bowl eligible on November 27 after losing to Texas Tech.

=== Bowl games ===
Bowl Game	Date	Stadium	City	Television	Matchups/Results	Attendance	Payout (US$)
New Mexico Bowl	December 18, 2010	University Stadium	Albuquerque, New Mexico	ESPN	BYU 52, UTEP 24	32,424	$750,000
Beef 'O' Brady's Bowl	December 21, 2010	Tropicana Field	St. Petersburg, Florida	ESPN	Louisville 31, Southern Miss 28	20,017	$1,000,000
Hawai'i Bowl	December 24, 2010	Aloha Stadium	Honolulu, HI	ESPN	Tulsa 62, #25 Hawaii 35	43,673	$750,000
Military Bowl	December 29, 2010	RFK Stadium	Washington, D.C.	ESPN	Maryland 51, East Carolina 20	38,062	$1,000,000
Armed Forces Bowl	December 30, 2010	Gerald J. Ford Stadium	Dallas	ESPN	Army 16, SMU 14	36,742	$750,000
Liberty Bowl	December 31, 2010	Liberty Bowl	Memphis, Tennessee	ESPN	#24 UCF 10, Georgia 6	51,231	$1,350,000

== All-Conference players ==
Coaches All-Conference Selections

Position	Player	Class	Team
First Team Offense (Coaches)
QB	G. J. Kinne	JR	Tulsa
RB	Bryce Beall	JR	Houston
RB	Zach Line	SO	SMU
OL	Kelvin Beachum	JR	SMU
OL	Matt McCants	JR	UAB
OL	Jah Reid	SR	UCF
OL	Willie Smith	SR	East Carolina
OL	Chris Thompson	JR	Houston
OL	Cameron Zipp	SR	Southern Miss
TE	Johdrick Morris	SR	Southern Miss
WR	Dwayne Harris	SR	East Carolina
WR	Patrick Edwards	JR	Houston
WR	Aldrick Robinson	SR	SMU
First Team Defense (Coaches)
DL	Vinny Curry	JR	Marshall
DL	Bruce Miller	SR	UCF
DL	Cheta Ozougwu	SR	Rice
DL	Taylor Thompson	JR	SMU
LB	Ja'Gared Davis	SO	SMU
LB	Mario Harvey	SR	Marshall
LB	Jamon Hughes	SR	Memphis
DB	Philip Davis	SR	Tulane
DB	Kemal Ishmael	SO	UCF
DB	Marco Nelson	FR	Tulsa
DB	Josh Robinson	SO	UCF
First Team Special Teams (Coaches)
K	Daniel Hrapmann	JR	Southern Miss
P	Kyle Martens	JR	Rice
KR	Quincy McDuffie	SO	UCF
PR	Dwayne Harris	SR	East Carolina
PR	Damaris Johnson	JR	Tulsa
LS	Brandon Long	SR	Rice

Position	Player	Class	Team
Second Team Offense (Coaches)
QB	Austin Davis	JR	Southern Miss
RB	Orleans Darkwa	FR	Tulane
RB	Ronnie Weaver	JR	UCF
OL	Clint Anderson	JR	Tulsa
OL	Rod Huntley	SR	UTEP
OL	Dominik Riley	SR	Memphis
OL	Chad Schofield	SR	Marshall
OL	Isaiah Thompson	SR	Houston
TE	Lee Smith	SR	Marshall
WR	Cole Beasley	JR	SMU
WR	Lance Lewis	JR	East Carolina
WR	Damaris Johnson	JR	Tulsa
Second Team Defense (Coaches)
DL	Anthony Gray	SR	Southern Miss
DL	Elliott Henigan	JR	UAB
DL	Cordarro Law	JR	Southern Miss
DL	Darius Nall	JR	UCF
LB	Trent Mackey	SO	Tulane
LB	Marcus McGraw	JR	Houston
LB	Youri Yenga	SR	SMU
DB	Travis Bradshaw	JR	Rice
DB	Emanuel Davis	JR	East Carolina
DB	Chris Banjo	JR	SMU
DB	Justin Wilson	SR	Southern Miss
DB	Travaun Nixon	JR	UTEP
Second Team Special Teams (Coaches)
K	Michael Barbour	JR	East Carolina
P	Michael Such	SR	Tulsa
KR	Damaris Johnson	JR	Tulsa
PR	Patrick Edwards	JR	Houston
LS	Charley Hughlett	JR	UCF

== Attendance ==
Team	Stadium	Capacity	Gm 1	Gm 2	Gm 3	Gm 4	Gm 5	Gm 6	Gm 7	Total	Average	% of Capacity
East Carolina	Dowdy–Ficklen Stadium	50,000	50,010	48,123	50,410	50,145	50,191	49,108	—	297,987	49,664	99.3%
Houston	Robertson Stadium	32,000	32,119	32,119	32,007	32,067	32,008	30,046	—	188,366	31,394	98.1%
Marshall	Joan C. Edwards Stadium	38,019	41,382	28,143	23,601	24,740	25,108	19,302	—	162,276	27,046	71.1%
Memphis	Liberty Bowl Memorial Stadium	62,380	27,965	22,231	18,848	19,731	39,742	14,992	—	143,149	23,858	38.2%
Rice	Rice Stadium	47,000	15,562	23,395	14,981	26,342	15,262	13,007	—	108,549	18,091	38.5%
Southern Miss	M. M. Roberts Stadium	36,000	27,316	30,211	27,518	32,334	26,415	32,606	—	176,400	29,400	81.6%
SMU	Gerald J. Ford Stadium	32,000	16,612	18,184	35,481	19,329	20,741	17,513	—	127,860	21,310	66.6%
Tulane	Louisiana Superdome	72,968	20,258	36,389	28,756	18,636	22,737	16,698	19,069	162,543	23,220	31.8%
Tulsa	H. A. Chapman Stadium	30,000	19,565	21,928	23,295	19,036	16,547	21,901	—	122,272	20,378	67.9%
UAB	Legion Field	71,594	25,885	23,681	11,756	17,860	14,083	16,177	—	109,442	18,240	25.4%
UCF	Bright House Networks Stadium	45,301	34,373	43,020	40,281	38,151	40,073	40,358	41,045	277,301	39,614	87.4%
UTEP	Sun Bowl Stadium	51,500	30,029	39,214	29,765	28,955	25,007	23,127	—	176,097	29,349	56.9%
