= Daniel Hrapmann =

American football player (born 1989)

No. 5
- Position: Placekicker

Personal information
- Born: April 21, 1989 (age 37); New Orleans, Louisiana, U.S.
- Listed height: 5 ft 9 in (1.75 m)
- Listed weight: 164 lb (74 kg)

Career information
- High school: Holy Cross (New Orleans)
- College: Southern Mississippi
- NFL draft: 2012: undrafted

Career history
- Pittsburgh Steelers (2012)*; New Orleans VooDoo (2013)*; Pittsburgh Steelers (2013)*; New Orleans VooDoo (2013–2014)*; Arizona Cardinals (2014)*; Miami Dolphins (2014)*
- * Offseason or practice squad member only

Awards and highlights
- First-team All-American (2010); First-team All-C-USA (2010); Second-team All-C-USA (2011)

Career NFL statistics
- Field goals made: 0
- Field goals attempted: 0
- Field goal %: 0.0%
- Longest field goal: 0

Daniel Hrapmann (born April 21, 1989) is an American former professional football player who was a placekicker in the National Football League (NFL). He played college football for the Southern Miss Golden Eagles from 2010 to 2012. He went on to play in the preseason with the Miami Dolphins, two preseasons with the Arizona Cardinals and two with the Pittsburgh Steelers.

Hrapmann is a native of New Orleans, Louisiana, where he attended and graduated from the Holy Cross school for boys, eventually transferring to Southern Miss from the Southeastern Louisiana University in 2008.

During college, Hrapmann was awarded the Walter Camp All-American award, the All-Conference award, as-well as being a Lou Graza Award Finalist, in the year 2010.

== Professional career ==
=== Pittsburgh Steelers ===
On May 17, 2012, Hrapmann was signed as an undrafted free agent for the Pittsburgh Steelers. On August 27, 2012, he was waived along with 14 others. He was signed to the Reserve/Future squad on January 11, 2013. On August 16, 2013, he was waived by the Steelers.

=== Miami Dolphins ===
Hrapmann was signed by the Miami Dolphins during the 2014 offseason, but was waived on August 15, 2014, after the team signed John Potter.
