= Damion Fletcher =

American football player (born 1987)

Personal information
- Born: July 1, 1987 (age 39); Biloxi, Mississippi, U.S.
- Listed height: 5 ft 10 in (1.78 m)
- Listed weight: 183 lb (83 kg)

Career information
- High school: Biloxi High School
- College: Southern Miss (2006-2009)

Awards and highlights
- Conerly Trophy (2007); First-team All-C-USA (2007); Second-team All-C-USA (2009)
- Stats at ESPN

Damion Fletcher (born July 1, 1987) is an American former college football running back who played at the University of Southern Mississippi.

== Early life ==
Fletcher attended Biloxi High School. He had 1,750 yards and 26 touchdowns as a junior when he led them to a 7-4 record. They lost to Meridian Wildcats in the first round of the playoffs. He finished his career with 952 yards and 13 touchdowns as a senior. He was also an All-District selection for two years, as well as a Region 4-5A Offensive Player of the Year, two-time Sun Herald's All-Coast team twice, Second-team All-State by The Clarion-Ledger. He was also his team's Most Valuable Player and team captain. He was also a state 5A winner of the triple jump. A two-star rating by rivals.com. He was also named All-Southeast Region by PrepStar.

== College career ==
In the 2006 season, he ran for the 13th most yards by a freshman in NCAA history. He set school and conference freshman rushing records with 1,388 yards on 276 carries (5.0 yards-per-carry) and 11 touchdowns. He also ranked 11th in the nation in rushing, the first among true freshmen running backs, 25th in all-purpose yards, second in conference rushing, seventh in all-purpose yards and eight in touchdowns scoring. He is also the school's first 1,000-yard rusher since 2002 and the second ranked single-season rusher. He helped the offense finish with over 2,000 yards rushing for the first time since 1987. He was named the team's offensive Player of the Week following his performances against Florida, UCF, and Tulane. Also in 2006, he was named a Freshman All-American by The Sporting News. During his sophomore season, he rushed for 1,586 yards on 295 carries (5.4 yards-per-carry) and 15 touchdowns. He also had 29 receptions with 227 yards (7.8 yards-per-carry).

He was awarded the Most Valuable Player award following the 2007 GMAC Bowl. He was a finalist for the Conerly Trophy in 2006 and won the award in 2007. Also in 2007, he was named Conference USA Offensive Player of the Year by CollegeFootballNews.com. He is a Second-team All-American by Athlon Sports. Honored as the toughest running back to bring down by Lindy's. Named #46 on Top 67 running backs in the nation by Phil Steele's. In 2008, Fletcher saw his numbers hit a slight decline as he ran for 1,313 (6.0 yards-per-carry) on 219 carries, and 10 rushing touchdowns, both the lowest he has had in his three-year career as a Golden Eagle. He recorded 33 receptions with 248 yards and 1 touchdown.

He ran for 1,015 yards in the 2009 season, including 78 yards in a season-ending loss in 2009 New Orleans Bowl versus the Middle Tennessee Blue Raiders. He became only the ninth player in NCAA FBS (Division I-A) history to reach 1,000 yards in all four seasons, finishing his college career with 5,302 yards. Fletcher passed Herschel Walker (5,259) and LaDainian Tomlinson (5,263) for eighth on the NCAA's career rushing list.

=== College statistics ===
Year	Team	Att.	Yards	Avg.	TD	Rec.	Yds.	Avg.	TD
2006	Southern Miss	276	1,388	5.0	11	18	142	7.9	0
2007	Southern Miss	295	1,586	5.4	15	29	227	7.8	0
2008	Southern Miss	219	1,313	6.0	10	33	248	7.5	1
2009	Southern Miss	219	1,015	4.6	8	29	289	10.0	1
Total		1009	5,302	5.3	44	109	906	8.3	2
