= Austin Davis (American football) =

American football player and coach (born 1989)

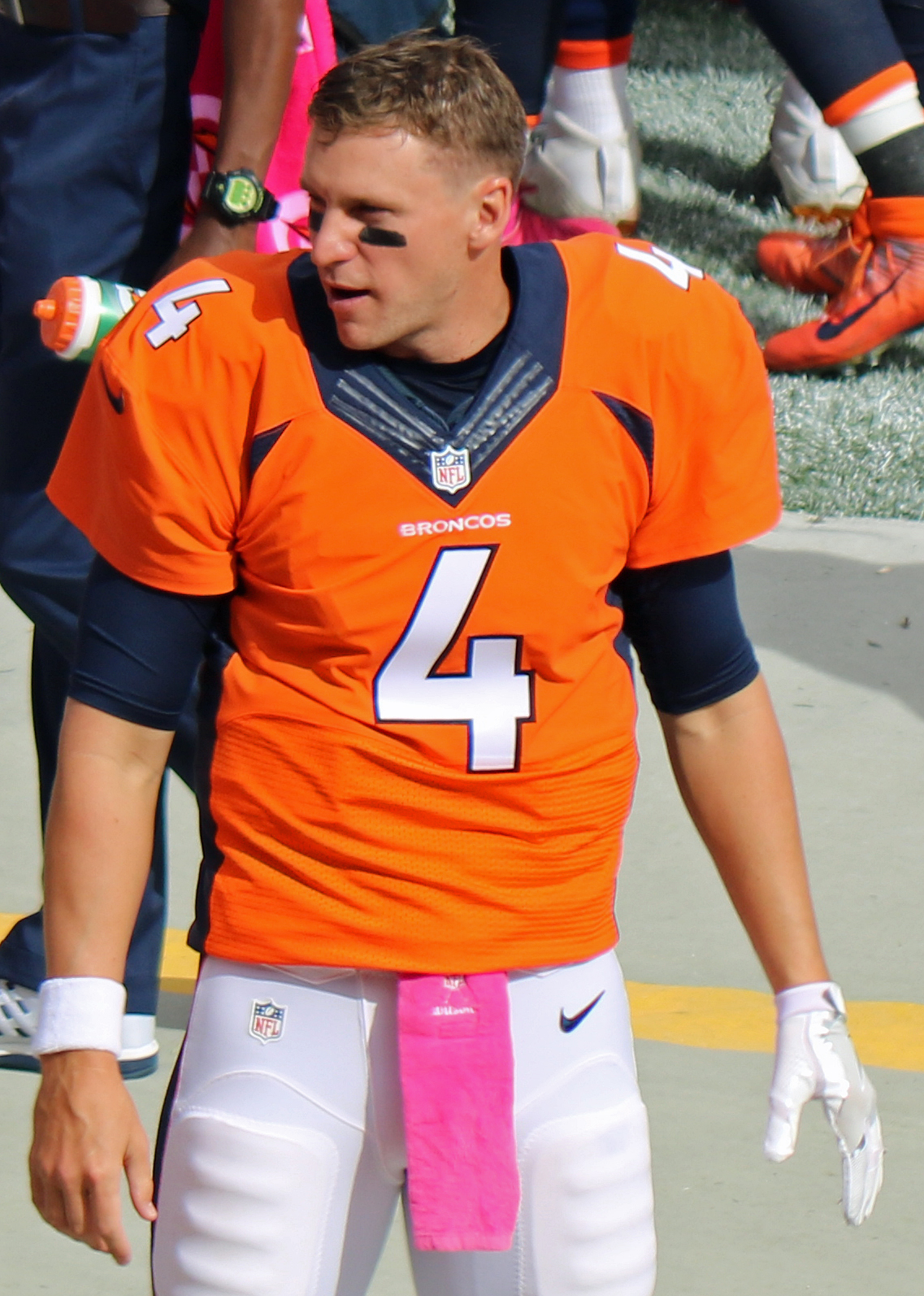
- Davis with the Denver Broncos in 2016

No. 9, 7, 6, 4
- Position: Quarterback

Personal information
- Born: June 2, 1989 (age 37); Ringgold, Georgia, U.S.
- Listed height: 6 ft 2 in (1.88 m)
- Listed weight: 221 lb (100 kg)

Career information
- High school: West Lauderdale (Collinsville, Mississippi)
- College: Southern Miss (2007–2011)
- NFL draft: 2012: undrafted

Career history

Playing
- St. Louis Rams (2012); Miami Dolphins (2013)*; St. Louis Rams (2013–2014); Cleveland Browns (2015); Denver Broncos (2016); Seattle Seahawks (2017); Tennessee Titans (2018)
- * Offseason or practice squad member only

Coaching
- Seattle Seahawks (2019) Offensive assistant; Seattle Seahawks (2020–2021) Quarterbacks coach

Awards and highlights
- Burlsworth Trophy (2011); Conerly Trophy (2011); 2× Second-team All-C-USA (2010, 2011)

Career NFL statistics
- Passing attempts: 378
- Passing completions: 236
- Completion percentage: 62.4%
- TD–INT: 13–12
- Passing yards: 2,548
- Passer rating: 80.4
- Stats at Pro Football Reference

Austin Davis (born June 2, 1989) is an American former professional football player who was a quarterback in the National Football League (NFL) for seven seasons. He played college football for the Southern Miss Golden Eagles, where he began his career as a walk-on before becoming a four-year starter. After going undrafted in the 2012 NFL draft, Davis signed with the St. Louis Rams. He started eight games for the Rams in 2014 and two games for the Cleveland Browns in 2015. He was also on the active rosters of the Denver Broncos, Seattle Seahawks and Tennessee Titans, and the practice squad of the Miami Dolphins. Davis was later the Seahawks' quarterbacks coach for two seasons.

== Early life ==
Davis was born on June 2, 1989. Davis attended West Lauderdale High School in Collinsville, Mississippi, where he was coached by Stan McCain. He would become the winningest quarterback in the school's history. As a senior, Davis threw for 1,100 yards passing with 15 touchdowns, rushed for 600 yards with six touchdowns and recorded a 67 percent completion rating. He was a four-year letterwinner and was named team MVP. During his career, Davis received all-area honors, was named best offensive back in the district and played in the Mississippi/Alabama All-Star game.

Davis' cousin, Jason Smith, had a nine-year career in Major League Baseball and his brother, Bo, played baseball for the San Diego Padres organization and helped lead the Southern Miss Golden Eagles to their first College World Series appearance. Davis was also an all-state baseball player in high school.

== College career ==
Davis' only football scholarship offer came from Southeastern Louisiana of the Football Championship Subdivision. He chose instead to attend the University of Southern Mississippi on a baseball scholarship.

Davis was a walk-on to the Golden Eagles football program and redshirted the 2007 season. For 2008, Davis was named the starting quarterback by head coach Larry Fedora and became the first freshman to be named the starting quarterback at Southern Miss since Tommy Waters in 1991. Davis began the season with five 200-yard passing games, more than any other Southern Miss quarterback has put together, and nine altogether for the season, tying a school record for most in a season. For the year, Davis set a new school record with 3,128 passing yards and broke Brett Favre's school record for most touchdown passes by a freshman with 23. He ended the year with a combined total of 15 school records for both game and single-season marks, which included most passing yards in a game (461) and most rushing touchdowns in a contest (5) as well as total offense for a season (3,323). Davis was ranked 16th nationally in total offense (279.7) and 52nd in passing efficiency (128.6) in the Football Bowl Subdivision (FBS). His total offense average was the highest among freshmen quarterbacks in the country, ahead of the likes of Kellen Moore of Boise State (265.9) and Robert Griffin of Baylor (244.5). In the 2008 New Orleans Bowl, Davis threw for 276 yards and two touchdowns and became the first freshman quarterback to lead the Golden Eagles to a bowl game victory. Davis was named to the All-Conference USA freshman team and a freshman All-American honorable mention by CollegeFootballNews.com. Before the 2009 season, Davis was named on the Manning Award watch list.

Davis got off to another great start in the 2009 season by completing 108–156 passes (69%) for 1,165 yards and 10 touchdowns against just 2 interceptions. He gained some national notoriety following a 35–28 loss to nationally ranked Kansas, in which Davis matched All-American candidate Todd Reesing yard for yard. However, his promising start was cut short by a broken foot suffered in the fifth game of the season against UAB.

Davis returned in 2010 and put up another good season, throwing for 3,103 yards with 20 touchdowns against just 6 interceptions while running for another 452 yards and 10 touchdowns. On November 30, Southern Miss went on the road to face the eventual C-USA and Liberty Bowl champion Central Florida and their highly rated defense. Davis responded by completing 21–34 passes for 264 yard and 4 scores, leading the Golden Eagles to a 31–21 road upset over the ranked Knights. He delivered an encore the next week in an emotional game against the Houston Cougars. Following the shooting of three teammates, Davis responded with the best game of his career, completing 24 of 31 passes for 293 yards and 2 scores while running for 111 yards and 4 more scores as Southern Miss topped Houston 59–41. In the Papajohns.com Bowl against Louisville, Davis passed Brett Favre on the schools passing touchdown record with a 32-yard pass to Quentin Pierce in the first quarter. Davis would go on to throw another touchdown as well as catch one in the 31–28 loss.

Heading into his senior season, Davis had either broken or was on the verge of breaking nearly every passing record in Southern Miss history. He passed Favre's yardage record in the second game of the season at Marshall. Davis had arguably his best career performance on October 8, at Navy. He completed 21 of his 23 passes for 283 yards and 3 scores as well as running for 75 yards and another score, posting a QB rating of 237.7. Davis led the Golden Eagles to a C-USA Eastern Division championship and a spot in the conference championship game against undefeated and 6th ranked Houston and their record setting quarterback Case Keenum. Despite being a 15-point underdog and being overshadowed by Keenum prior to the game, Davis outplayed Keenum, connecting on 17 of 34 passes for 276 yards and 4 touchdowns as he led Southern Miss to one of the biggest wins in school history. Davis finished his career with a 24–17 victory in the Hawaii bowl over Nevada. Davis' last pass as a collegiate quarterback was a touchdown in the final minutes to secure the win. Davis ended the 2011 season throwing for 3,496 yards and 30 touchdowns, both school records, while also rushing for 352 yards and four touchdowns. At the conclusion of his senior season he was named the winner of the Conerly Trophy, an award given annually to the best college football player in the state of Mississippi by the Mississippi Sports Hall of Fame.

His final stats were: 933–1527 (61.1%) for 10,898 yards, 83 touchdowns against just 27 interceptions. He also ran the ball 460 times for 1,375 yards and 25 touchdowns. He also caught 2 passes for 25 yards and a touchdown. Davis accounted for 109 touchdowns in his four-year career.

== Professional football career ==
=== Pre-draft ===
Davis was rated the 13th best quarterback in the 2012 NFL draft by NFLDraftScout.com. Prior to the Draft, Bleacher Report's Tyler Ward named Davis as one of his eleven potential late-round sleepers.

Pre-draft measurables
Height	Weight	Arm length	Hand span	40-yard dash	10-yard split	20-yard split	20-yard shuttle	Three-cone drill	Vertical jump	Broad jump
6 ft 1 5/8 in (1.87 m)	219 lb (99 kg)	31 3/4 in (0.81 m)	10 3/8 in (0.26 m)	4.76 s	1.63 s	2.77 s	4.11 s	6.73 s	31 in (0.79 m)	9 ft 1 in (2.77 m)
All values from NFL Combine

=== St. Louis Rams (first stint) ===
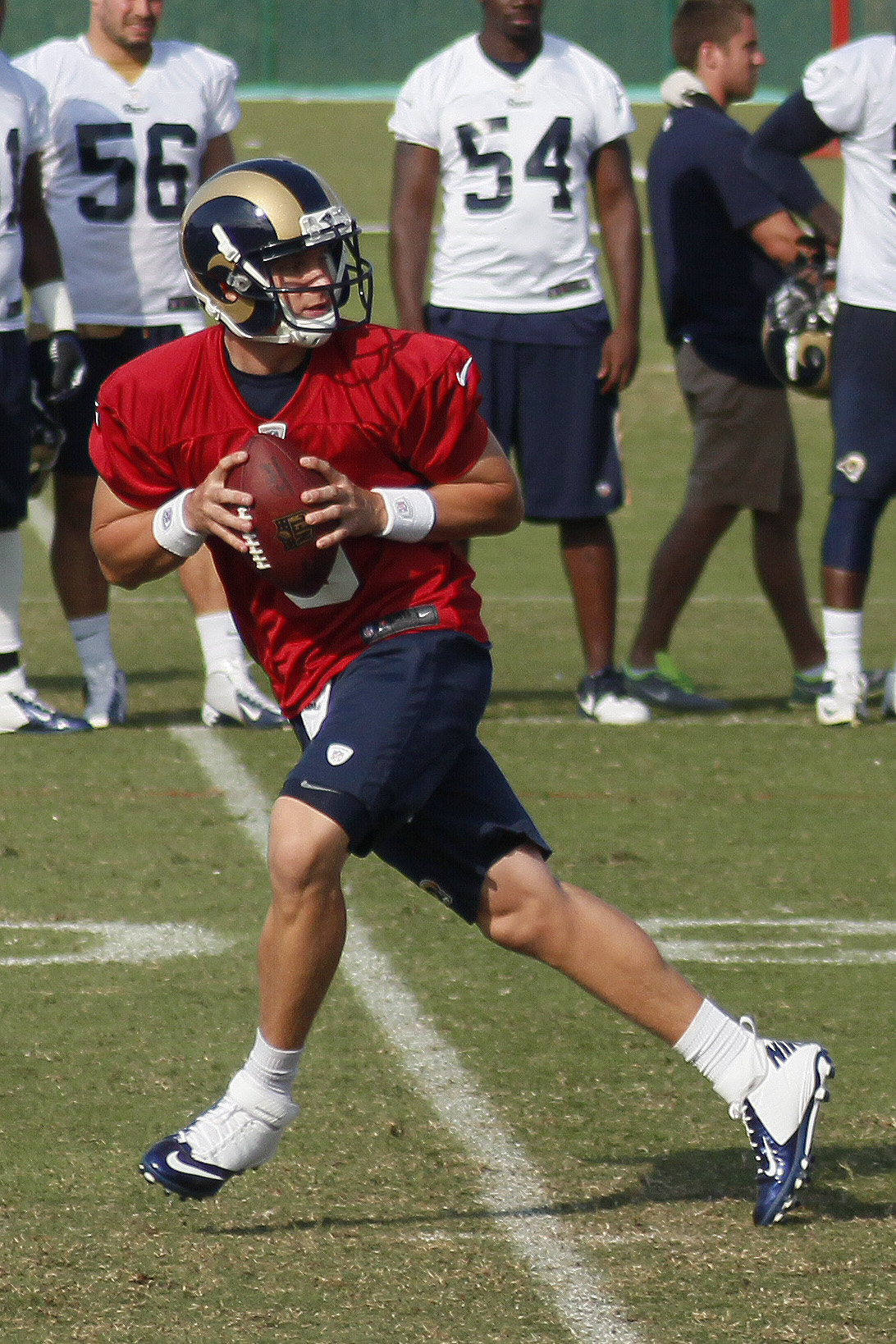
Davis with the St. Louis Rams in 2013

Davis went undrafted in the 2012 NFL draft and signed a free agent deal with the St. Louis Rams. On August 30, 2013, he was cut by the Rams.

=== Miami Dolphins ===
The Miami Dolphins signed Davis to their practice squad on September 10, 2013. He was released by the team on September 17, 2013.

=== St Louis Rams (second stint) ===
Davis re-signed with the Rams on October 22, 2013, after an injury to Sam Bradford. In the first week of the 2014 NFL season against the Minnesota Vikings, Davis entered the game at the start of the second half in relief of starter Shaun Hill. A week later, due to Hill's injury, Davis made his NFL starting debut on September 14, in a winning effort against the Tampa Bay Buccaneers.

Following the Rams' 28–26 upset win over the defending Super Bowl champion Seattle Seahawks in Week 7, former All-Pro quarterback and legend Brett Favre tabbed Davis as a potential Tom Brady or Kurt Warner of the future, both of whom won Super Bowls despite a bleak start to their NFL careers. During the victory, Davis completed 17-of-20 passes, the best completion percentage in NFL history against a defending Super Bowl champion; the former Southern Miss QB also added 152 passing yards and two touchdowns, one of which ultimately sealed their victory after Davis successfully led an 80-yard drive.

After two interceptions and a lost fumble in the 4th quarter against the Arizona Cardinals in early November, Davis was benched in favor of Hill.

On September 5, 2015, Davis was released by the Rams.

=== Cleveland Browns ===
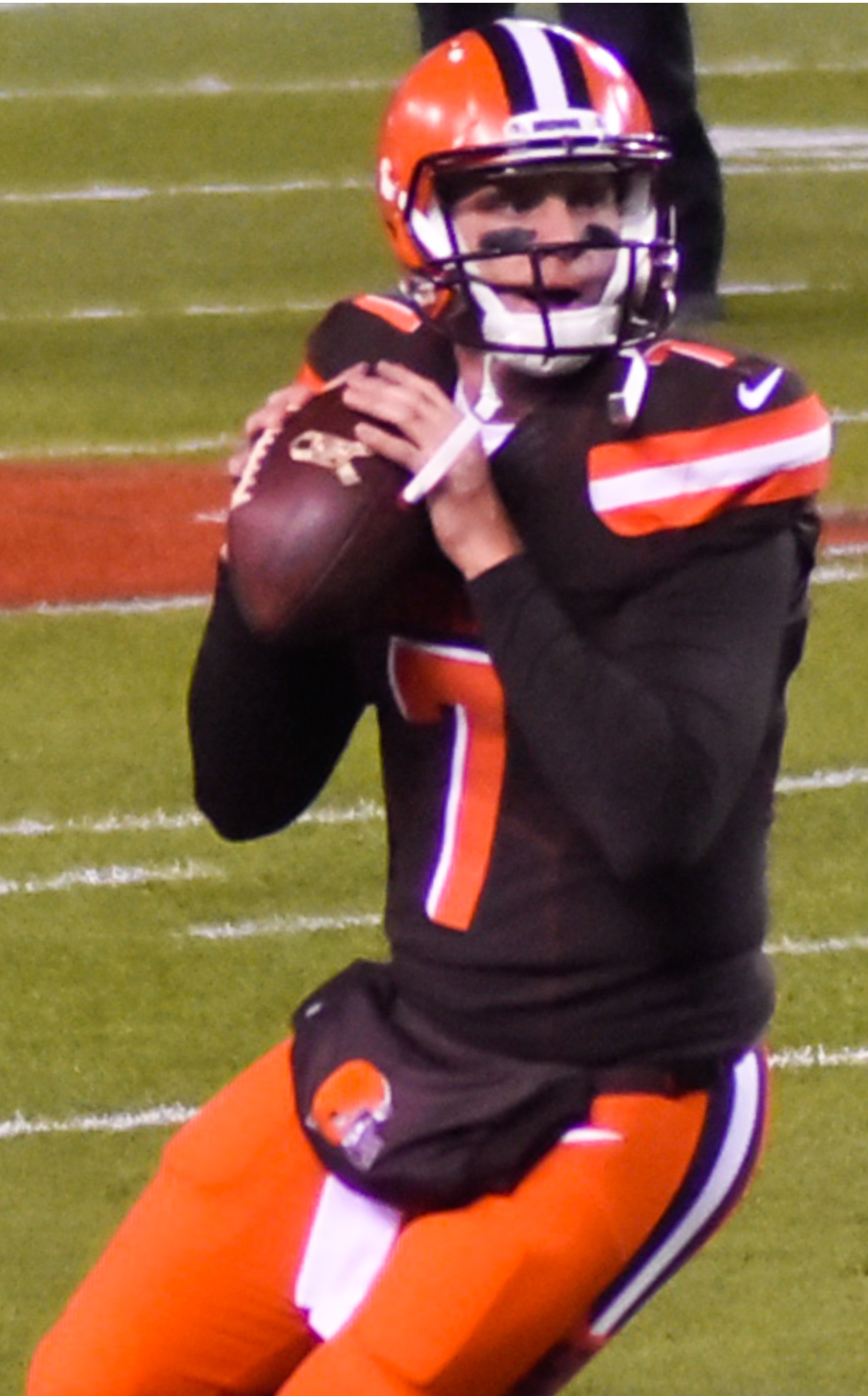
Davis with the Cleveland Browns in 2015

On September 7, 2015, Davis signed with the Cleveland Browns. He signed a two-year, $4.137 million contract extension on September 30.

Davis played in relief of an injured Josh McCown in the Week 12 game against the Baltimore Ravens. He completed 7 of 10 passes for 77 yards, drove for a game-tying touchdown, and led the Browns into position for a game-winning field goal, but the team lost when the field goal was blocked and returned for a touchdown. After McCown was ruled out for the rest of the season, Davis was named the Browns starter for the following week over Johnny Manziel. Following a 37–3 loss to the Cincinnati Bengals, Davis was replaced as starter by Manziel. Davis started again in the season finale against the Pittsburgh Steelers after Manziel was ruled out with a concussion, going 24 for 46 with no touchdowns and a pair of interceptions in a 28–12 loss.

He was released by the Browns on August 29, 2016.

=== Denver Broncos ===
Davis signed a one-year contract with the Denver Broncos on September 3, 2016. He was released on December 23, 2016.

=== Seattle Seahawks ===
On June 5, 2017, Davis signed with the Seattle Seahawks. After outplaying incumbent backup quarterback Trevone Boykin in the preseason, Davis made the final 53-man roster for the 2017 NFL season as the sole backup to Russell Wilson.

On April 16, 2018, Davis re-signed with the Seahawks. He was placed on injured reserve on September 1, 2018. He was released on September 7, 2018.

=== Tennessee Titans ===
On September 25, 2018, Davis was signed by the Tennessee Titans after backup Blaine Gabbert suffered a concussion against the Jacksonville Jaguars in Week 3. He was released on October 9, 2018. He was re-signed on December 24, 2018, after an injury to starter Marcus Mariota. On February 4, 2019, Davis was released.

== Career statistics ==
=== NFL ===
Year	Team	Games			Passing								Rushing				Sacks		Fumbles (Note: Fumbles lost data taken from Pro Football Reference career game log)	
Year	Team	GP	GS	Record	Cmp	Att	Pct	Yds	Y/A	TD	Int	Rtg	Att	Yds	Avg	TD	Sck	SckY	Fum	Lost
2012	STL	0	0	DNP																
2013	STL	0	0	DNP																
2014	STL	10	8	3–5	180	284	63.4	2,001	7.0	12	9	85.1	16	36	2.3	0	29	179	5	3
2015	CLE	3	2	0–2	56	94	59.6	547	5.8	1	3	66.2	7	33	4.7	0	11	96	2	2
2016	DEN	0	0	DNP																
2017	SEA	3	0	–	0	0	0.0	0	0.0	0	0	0.0	1	−1	−1.0	0	0	0	0	0
2018	TEN	0	0	DNP																
Career		16	10	3–7	236	378	62.4	2,548	6.7	13	12	80.4	24	68	2.8	0	40	275	7	5

=== College ===
Season	Team	Passing								Rushing			
Season	Team	Cmp	Att	Pct	Yds	Y/A	TD	Int	Rtg	Att	Yds	Avg	TD
2008	Southern Miss	261	454	57.5	3,128	6.9	23	8	128.6	155	508	3.3	9
2009	Southern Miss	108	156	69.2	1,165	7.5	10	2	150.6	50	63	1.3	2
2010	Southern Miss	278	442	62.9	3,103	7.0	20	6	134.1	145	452	3.1	10
2011	Southern Miss	286	475	60.2	3,496	7.4	30	11	138.2	110	352	3.2	4
Career		933	1,527	61.1	10,892	7.1	83	27	135.4	460	1,375	3.0	25

== Coaching career ==
On February 22, 2019, Davis returned to the Seattle Seahawks as an offensive assistant. On March 10, 2020, Seattle promoted Davis to quarterbacks coach, making him the youngest such coach in the NFL at 30 years old.

On December 18, 2021, Davis was hired by the Auburn Tigers to be the school's offensive coordinator and quarterback coach. On January 31, 2022, he announced he was stepping down from the role.

== Professional baseball career ==
Davis was drafted by the Boston Red Sox in the 2012 MLB draft in the 31st round, even though he only played baseball for one year in 2007. Davis ultimately decided to pursue a career in the NFL instead and has never played professional baseball at any level.

== See also ==
- List of Division I FBS passing yardage leaders
