= Vincent Alexander =

American football player (born 1964)

No. 30
- Position: Running back

Personal information
- Born: March 11, 1964 (age 62); St. Tammany, Louisiana, U.S.
- Listed height: 5 ft 10 in (1.78 m)
- Listed weight: 205 lb (93 kg)

Career information
- High school: Covington (LA)
- College: Southern Miss
- NFL draft: 1987: undrafted

Career history
- New Orleans Saints (1987)

Career NFL statistics
- Games played: 1
- Touchdowns: 1
- Stats at Pro Football Reference

Vincent Leon Alexander (born March 11, 1964) is an American former professional football player who was a running back in the National Football League (NFL). He played with the New Orleans Saints in 1987. He played college football for the Southern Miss Golden Eagles from 1983 to 1986. As a freshman, he gained 153 rushing yards in his first start. He also returned the opening kickoff 96 yards for a touchdown against the Alabama Crimson Tide in November 1983. He gained 551 rushing yards in 1983, 572 in 1984, 847 yards in 1985, and 668 yards in 1986. He was the leading rusher for Southern Mississippi for three consecutive years from 1984 to 1986. First Team All-South Independent(1985), Second team all-South independent (1986)
