= Shawn Nelson (American football) =

American football player (born 1985)

No. 82, 89
- Position: Tight end

Personal information
- Born: October 5, 1985 (age 41); Gonzales, Louisiana, U.S.
- Listed height: 6 ft 4 in (1.93 m)
- Listed weight: 238 lb (108 kg)

Career information
- High school: East Ascension (Gonzales)
- College: Southern Miss
- NFL draft: 2009: 4th round, 121st overall pick

Career history
- Buffalo Bills (2009–2010); New York Jets (2011); Blacktips (2014)

Career NFL statistics
- Receptions: 20
- Receiving yards: 181
- Receiving touchdowns: 1
- Stats at Pro Football Reference

Shawn Nelson (born October 5, 1985) is an American former professional football player who was a tight end in the National Football League (NFL). Nelson was selected by the Buffalo Bills in the fourth round of the 2009 NFL draft. He played college football for the Southern Miss Golden Eagles.

Nelson was also a member of the New York Jets and Blacktips.

== Early life ==
Nelson attended East Ascension High School in Gonzales, Louisiana. He was the high school teammate of San Francisco 49ers defensive lineman Glenn Dorsey.

== College career ==
Nelson attended the University of Southern Mississippi and finished his college career with 157 receptions totaling 2,054 yards and sixteen touchdowns.

=== Awards and honors ===
- MVP of New Orleans Bowl (2005)
- 2x First-team All-Conference USA (2006–2007)
- Honorable mention All-Conference USA (2008)
- Freshman All-American 2005

== Professional career ==
=== Pre-draft ===
Nelson impressed many scouts with his solid college career and impressive scouting combine numbers. At the NFL Combine, he ran a 4.56 forty-yard dash, bench pressed nineteen reps and posted a vertical jump of thirty three inches. Going into the 2009 NFL draft, Nelson was regarded as one of the top tight end prospects.

=== Buffalo Bills ===
Nelson was selected in the fourth round with the 121st overall pick by the Buffalo Bills.

In his debut game against the New England Patriots on Monday Night Football, Shawn Nelson caught an 11-yard touchdown pass from quarterback Trent Edwards. The Bills went on to lose the game 24–25. Nelson was suspended without pay for the team’s first four games of the 2010 regular season for violating the NFL Policy and Program for Substances of Abuse. Nelson’s suspension began on Saturday, September 4, 2010. He was eligible to return to the Bills’ active roster on October 4, 2010. Nelson was released by the Bills on September 3, 2011.

=== New York Jets ===
Nelson was signed by the New York Jets on October 31, 2011. Nelson was waived by the team on November 22, 2011, due to a non-football related illness.

=== Blacktips ===
Nelson was also a member of the Blacktips of the Fall Experimental Football League (FXFL).
