= Cedric Scott =

American football player and coach (born 1977)

Profile
- Position: Defensive end

Personal information
- Born: October 19, 1977 (age 49); Gulfport, Mississippi, U.S.

Career information
- College: Southern Miss
- NFL draft: 2001: 4th round, 114th overall pick

Career history

Playing
- New York Giants (2001); Cleveland Browns (2002); (2004)*; Scottish Claymores (2004); Edmonton Eskimos (2005–2006)
- * Offseason or practice squad member only

Coaching
- Southern Miss (2009–2011) Assistant strength and conditioning coach; Jacksonville Jaguars (2012–2021) Assistant strength and conditioning coach; Jacksonville Jaguars (2022–2024) Director of strength and conditioning

Awards and highlights
- Grey Cup champion (2005); Third-team All-American (2000); C-USA Co-Defensive Player of the Year (2000)
- Stats at Pro Football Reference

Cedric A. Scott (born October 19, 1977) is an American professional football coach and former defensive end who was most recently the head strength and conditioning coach for the Jacksonville Jaguars of the National Football League (NFL). Scott played college football for the Southern Miss Golden Eagles and was selected by the New York Giants in the fourth round of the 2001 NFL draft. He also played for the Cleveland Browns, as well as in NFL Europa for the Scottish Claymores and Edmonton Eskimos of the Canadian Football League (CFL).

== Early life ==
Cedric Scott was born in Gulfport, Mississippi, before playing college football at the University of Southern Mississippi for the Golden Eagles. He was selected by the New York Giants in the fourth round of the 2001 NFL draft and also played for the Cleveland Browns before playing with the Scottish Claymores and Edmonton Eskimos of the Canadian Football League (CFL). He was inducted into the University of Southern Mississippi Hall of Fame in 2015.

== Coaching career ==
Scott joined the Jacksonville Jaguars as an assistant strength coach in 2012. He was promoted to director of strength and conditioning in 2022. The Jaugars parted ways with Scott in 2025.
