= DeAndre Brown =

American football player (born 1989)

No. 17, 5
- Position: Wide receiver

Personal information
- Born: October 12, 1989 (age 37); Ocean Springs, Mississippi, U.S.
- Listed height: 6 ft 6 in (1.98 m)
- Listed weight: 240 lb (109 kg)

Career information
- High school: Ocean Springs
- College: Southern Miss
- NFL draft: 2011: undrafted

Career history
- Philadelphia Eagles (2011)*; Knoxville NightHawks (2013); New Orleans VooDoo (2014)*; Green Bay Blizzard (2016–2017)
- * Offseason or practice squad member only

Awards and highlights
- Second-team All-C-USA (2009); 4x All-America honors; CBS Sports Second-team All-America honors (2009); Sports Illustrated Second-team All-America honors (2009); Associated Press All-America honors (2009); Second-team All-PIFL (2013)
- Stats at Pro Football Reference
- Stats at ArenaFan.com

DeAndre Brown (born October 12, 1989) is an American former professional football player who was a wide receiver in the National Football League (NFL). He was signed by the Philadelphia Eagles as an undrafted free agent in 2011. He played college football for the Southern Miss Golden Eagles. He played high school football at Ocean Springs High School.

== College career ==
A top prospect in the class of 2008, Brown signed with Southern Miss over offers from LSU and other traditional college football powers.

Brown suffered a severe leg injury during the 2008 New Orleans Bowl, which required him to be hospitalized overnight for immediate surgery.

After a loss in the 2011 Beef 'O' Brady's Bowl in St. Petersburg, Florida, Brown decided to skip his senior season and enter the 2011 NFL draft.

=== College statistics ===
Year	Team	Games	Rushing				Receiving			
Year	Team	Games	Att	Yds	Avg	TD	Rec	Yds	Avg	TD
2008	Southern Miss	13	1	2	2.0	0	67	1,117	16.7	12
2009	Southern Miss	11	2	16	8.0	0	47	785	16.7	9
2010	Southern Miss	6	0	0	0	0	20	305	15.3	3
Total		30	3	18	6.0	0	134	2,207	16.5	24

== Professional career ==
Pre-draft measurables
Height	Weight	Arm length	Hand span	40-yard dash	20-yard shuttle	Three-cone drill	Vertical jump	Broad jump	Bench press	Wonderlic
6 ft 6 in (1.98 m)	239 lb (108 kg)	33 in (0.84 m)	9.5 in (0.24 m)	4.59 s	4.33 s	6.93 s	29 in (0.74 m)	9 ft 9 in (2.97 m)	19 reps	13
All values are from NFL Draft Combine

=== Philadelphia Eagles ===
Despite being initially projected to be drafted in the second or third round of the 2011 NFL draft, Brown was ultimately not selected by any team due to lingering concerns about his injury history and a 2010 arrest for disorderly conduct. He ultimately signed with the Philadelphia Eagles as an undrafted free agent on July 26, 2011. On August 8, Brown was waived by the Eagles.

=== Knoxville NightHawks ===
Brown signed with the Knoxville NightHawks of the Professional Indoor Football League (PIFL) for the 2013 season. Brown was named Second-team All-PIFL as an ironman.

=== New Orleans VooDoo ===
Brown was assigned to the New Orleans VooDoo of the Arena Football League (AFL) in 2014,

=== Green Bay Blizzard ===
On May 19, 2016, Brown was signed by the Green Bay Blizzard. Brown re-signed with the Blizzard on January 30, 2017.
