= Mike Dennery =

American football player (born 1950)

Profile
- Position: Linebacker

Personal information
- Born: June 25, 1950 (age 76); Philadelphia, Pennsylvania, U.S.

Career information
- College: Southern Miss

Career history
- 1974–1975: Oakland Raiders
- 1976: Miami Dolphins
- Stats at Pro Football Reference

Mike Dennery (born June 25, 1950) is an American former professional football player who was a linebacker for three seasons with the Oakland Raiders and Miami Dolphins of the National Football League (NFL). He played college football for the Southern Miss Golden Eagles.
