= Gerald McRath =

American football player (born 1986)

No. 51
- Position: Linebacker

Personal information
- Born: June 16, 1986 (age 40); Powder Springs, Georgia, U.S.
- Listed height: 6 ft 3 in (1.91 m)
- Listed weight: 231 lb (105 kg)

Career information
- High school: McEachern (Powder Springs)
- College: Southern Mississippi
- NFL draft: 2009: 4th round, 130th overall pick

Career history
- Tennessee Titans (2009–2012)

Awards and highlights
- Freshman All-American (2006); Conference USA Defensive P.O.Y. (2007); 2× First-team All-Conference USA (2007–2008); Third-team All-Conference USA (2006); Conference USA All-Freshman (2006)

Career NFL statistics
- Total tackles: 120
- Sacks: 1.5
- Interceptions: 1
- Stats at Pro Football Reference

Gerald McRath (born June 16, 1986) is an American former professional football player who was a linebacker in the National Football League (NFL). He played college football for the Southern Miss Golden Eagles and was selected by the Tennessee Titans in the fourth round of the 2009 NFL draft.

== Early life ==
He played high school football at McEachern High School in Powder Springs.

== Professional career ==
McRath ran a 4.59 sec 40-yard dash, best among linebackers in the 2009 NFL draft.

McRath was suspended for the first four games of the 2010 season for violating NFL policy on performance-enhancing substances.

== Coaching career ==
McRath is currently an assistant defensive coach at Maple Wood High School in Nashville, Tennessee.
