= Quez Watkins =

American football player (born 1998)

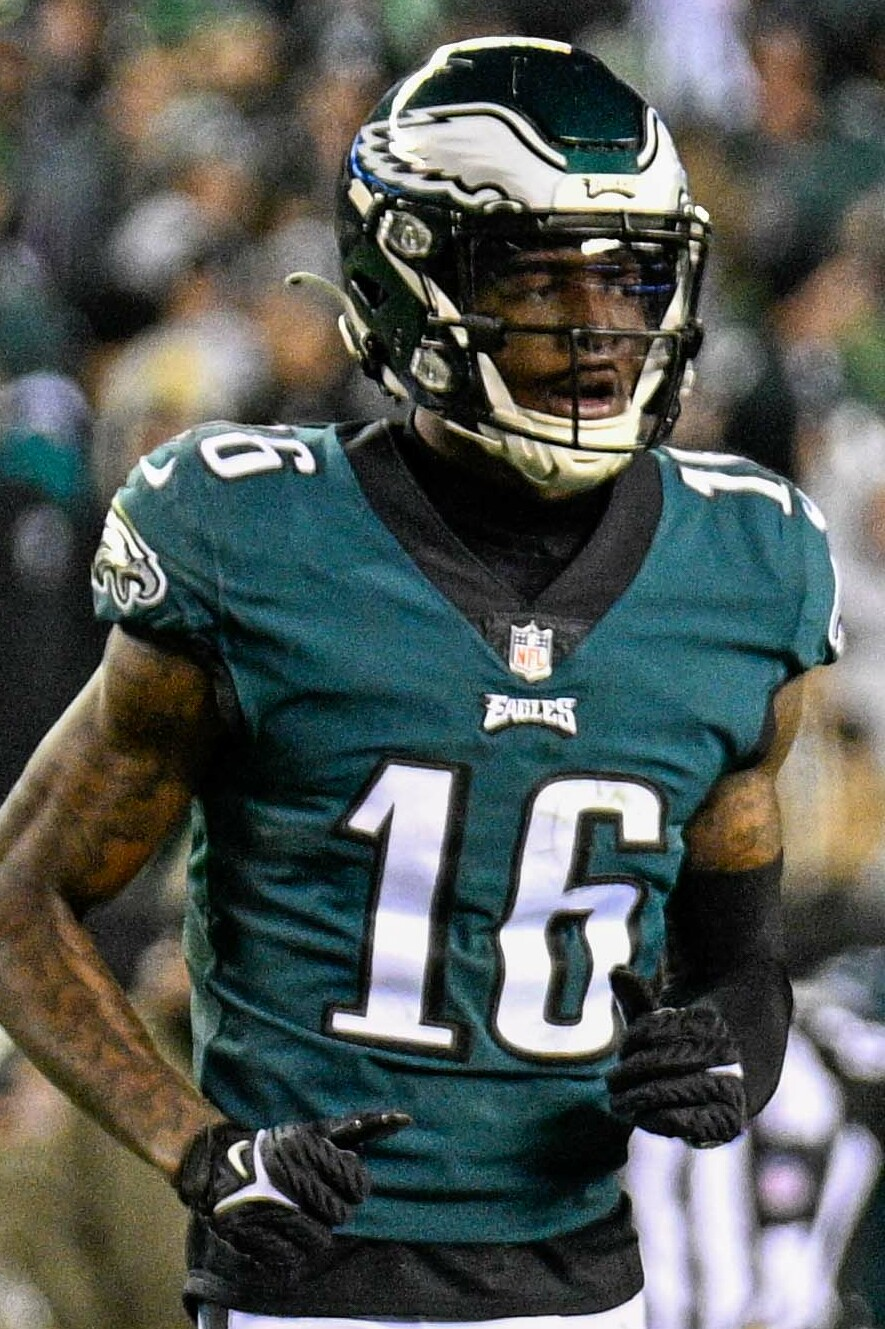
- Watkins with the Philadelphia Eagles in 2022

No. 9 – Indianapolis Colts
- Position: Wide receiver
- Roster status: Active

Personal information
- Born: June 9, 1998 (age 28); Athens, Alabama, U.S.
- Listed height: 6 ft 0 in (1.83 m)
- Listed weight: 193 lb (88 kg)

Career information
- High school: Athens (AL)
- College: Southern Miss (2016–2019)
- NFL draft: 2020: 6th round, 200th overall pick

Career history
- Philadelphia Eagles (2020–2023); Pittsburgh Steelers (2024)*; Arizona Cardinals (2025)*; Philadelphia Eagles (2025)*; Indianapolis Colts (2026–present)
- * Offseason or practice squad member only

Awards and highlights
- 2× First-team All-Conference USA (2018, 2019)

Career NFL statistics as of 2025
- Receptions: 98
- Receiving yards: 1,249
- Receiving touchdowns: 6
- Stats at Pro Football Reference

Terrance "Quez" Watkins (born June 9, 1998) is an American professional football wide receiver for the Indianapolis Colts of the National Football League (NFL). He played college football for the Southern Miss Golden Eagles and was selected by the Philadelphia Eagles in the sixth round of the 2020 NFL draft. He signed with Pittsburgh in 2024.

== Early life ==
Watkins grew up in Athens, Alabama, and attended Athens High School. During his junior season, he returned a punt and kickoff for touchdowns in the first two games. As a senior, he was named second team 6A All-State after catching 44 passes for 847 yards and 12 touchdowns. He committed to play college football at Southern Miss over offers from Georgia Southern, Middle Tennessee State, Western Kentucky and Samford.

== College career ==
Watkins redshirted his true freshman season. The following year he finished with 23 receptions for 337 yards and two touchdowns. As a redshirt sophomore Watkins led the Golden Eagles with 72 receptions, 889 receiving yards and nine touchdown catches and was named First team All-Conference USA. Watkins was again a first team All-Conference USA selection as a redshirt junior after catching 64 passes for 1,178 yards and six touchdowns despite missing the first two games of the season due to a suspension. Watkins announced that he would forgo his final season of NCAA eligibility to enter the 2020 NFL draft.

=== College statistics ===
Year	G	Receiving			
Year	G	Rec	Yds	Avg	TD
2017	11	23	337	14.7	2
2018	11	72	889	12.3	9
2019	12	64	1,178	18.4	6
Career	34	159	2,404	15.1	17

== Professional career ==
Pre-draft measurables
Height	Weight	Arm length	Hand span	Wingspan	40-yard dash	10-yard split	20-yard split	20-yard shuttle	Three-cone drill	Vertical jump	Broad jump
6 ft 0 1/8 in (1.83 m)	185 lb (84 kg)	32 7/8 in (0.84 m)	9 in (0.23 m)	6 ft 6 7/8 in (2.00 m)	4.35 s	1.51 s	2.55 s	4.36 s	7.28 s	36.5 in (0.93 m)	10 ft 5 in (3.18 m)
All values from NFL Combine

=== Philadelphia Eagles ===
Watkins was selected by the Philadelphia Eagles in the sixth round with the 200th overall pick of the 2020 NFL Draft. He was placed on injured reserve on September 6, 2020. He was designated to return from injured reserve on September 29, and began practicing with the team again. He was activated on October 10. In Week 15 against the Arizona Cardinals, Watkins caught three passes for 40 yards and his first career touchdown reception during the 33–26 loss. In the 2020 season, Watkins recorded seven receptions for 106 receiving yards and one receiving touchdown in six games.

Watkins established himself early on in the 2021 season as the wide receiver two for the Eagles. He was placed on the COVID list on December 13, 2021. In Week 2, against the San Francisco 49ers, he had two receptions for 117 receiving yards in the 17–11 loss. In the game, he recorded a 91-yard reception, which was the longest reception by any player in the 2021 NFL season. Watkins had a solid year in 2021, ending the campaign with 43 catches for 647 yards and one touchdown.

In the 2022 season, Watkins finished with 33 receptions for 354 receiving yards and three receiving touchdowns. In 2023, the Eagles reached Super Bowl LVII against the Kansas City Chiefs. In Super Bowl LVII, Watkins had one catch for 8 yards. During the third quarter with the Eagles up by 3 points, and at the Kansas City 42 yard-line, Watkins dropped a pass that would have put the Eagles inside of the ten yard-line. The Eagles ended up opting for a field goal, which extended their lead to six points. However, the Eagles went on to lose the game by a score of 38-35.

=== Pittsburgh Steelers ===
On April 1, 2024, Watkins signed a one-year contract with the Pittsburgh Steelers.

During the preseason, he posted one catch for 10 yards. The Steelers then cut him ahead of the 53-man roster deadline on August 27 and re-signed him to the practice squad.

=== Arizona Cardinals ===
On January 16, 2025, Watkins signed a reserve/future contract with the Arizona Cardinals. He was placed on injured reserve on August 2, and released eight days later.

=== Philadelphia Eagles (second stint) ===
On September 24, 2025, Watkins signed with the Philadelphia Eagles' practice squad. He signed a reserve/future contract with Philadelphia on January 12, 2026.

On August 30, 2026, Watkins was released by the Eagles as a part of final roster cuts.

=== Indianapolis Colts ===
On October 6, 2026, Watkins signed with the Indianapolis Colts practice squad. On November 17, he was signed to the active roster.

=== Professional statistics ===
==== Regular season ====
Season	Team	Games		Receiving					Fumbles	
Season	Team	GP	GS	Rec	Yds	Avg	Lng	TD	FUM	Lost
2020	PHI	6	0	7	106	15.1	43	1	0	0
2021	PHI	17	12	43	647	15.0	91	1	0	0
2022	PHI	17	8	33	354	10.7	53	3	1	1
2023	PHI	9	5	15	142	9.5	19	1	0	0
Total		49	25	98	1,249	12.7	91	6	1	1

==== Playoffs ====
Season	Team	Games		Receiving					Fumbles	
Season	Team	GP	GS	Rec	Yds	Avg	Lng	TD	FUM	Lost
2021	PHI	1	0	2	35	17.5	35	0	0	0
2022	PHI	3	1	1	8	8.0	8	0	0	0
2023	PHI	1	0	3	12	4.0	6	0	0	0
Total		5	1	6	55	9.2	35	0	0	0
