= Nick Mullens =

American football player (born 1995)

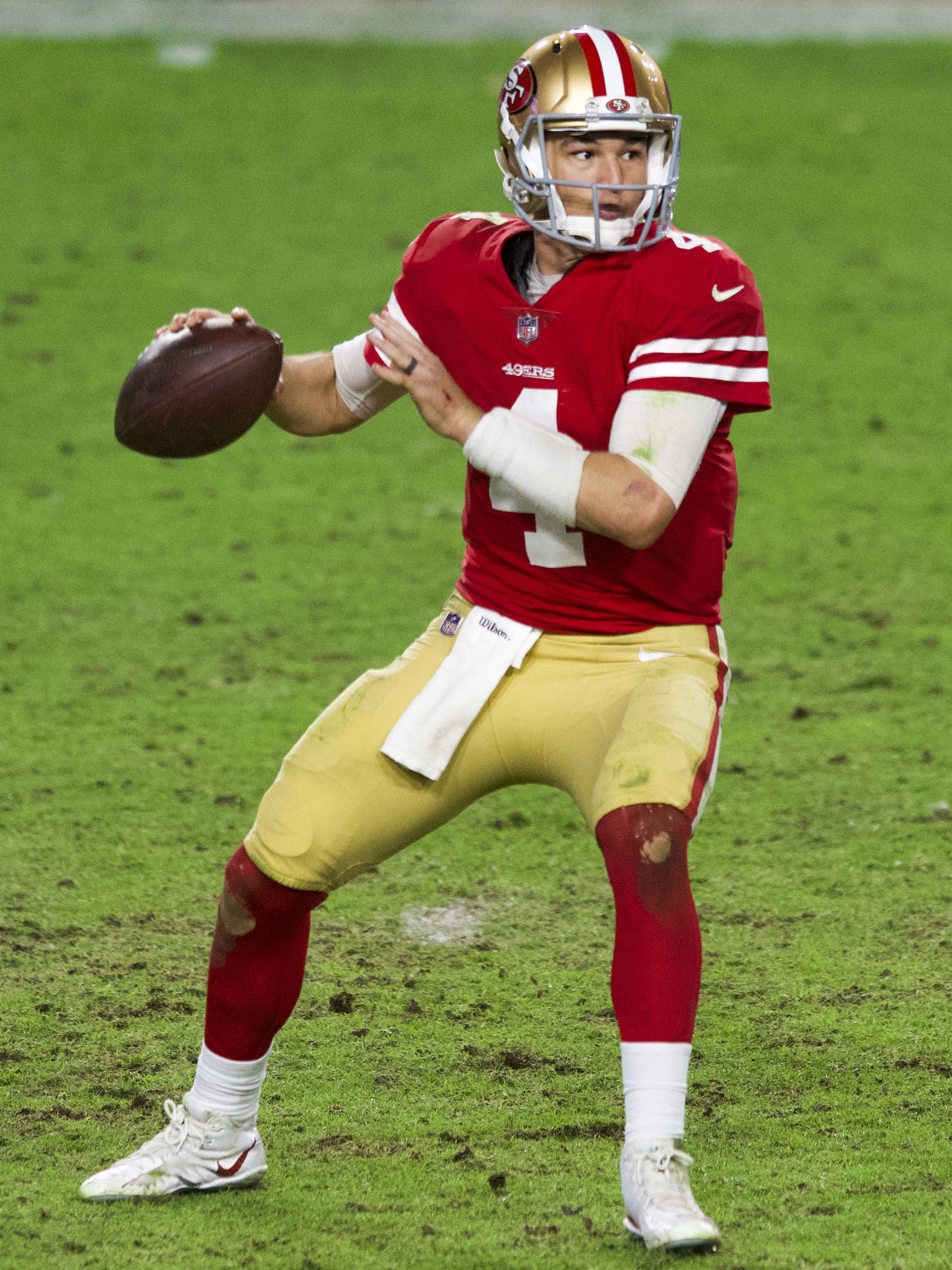
- Mullens with the San Francisco 49ers in 2020

No. 14 – Jacksonville Jaguars
- Position: Quarterback
- Roster status: Practice squad

Personal information
- Born: March 21, 1995 (age 31); Little Rock, Arkansas, U.S.
- Listed height: 6 ft 0 in (1.83 m)
- Listed weight: 210 lb (95 kg)

Career information
- High school: Spain Park (Hoover, Alabama)
- College: Southern Miss (2013–2016)
- NFL draft: 2017: undrafted

Career history
- San Francisco 49ers (2017–2020); Philadelphia Eagles (2021)*; Cleveland Browns (2021); Las Vegas Raiders (2022)*; Minnesota Vikings (2022–2024); Jacksonville Jaguars (2025–present)
- * Offseason or practice squad member only

Awards and highlights
- C-USA Offensive Player of the Year (2015); Second-team All-C-USA (2015)

Career NFL statistics as of 2025
- Passing attempts: 808
- Passing completions: 533
- Completion percentage: 66.0%
- TD–INT: 34–31
- Passing yards: 6,448
- Passer rating: 88.3
- Stats at Pro Football Reference

Nicholas Clayton Mullens (born March 21, 1995) is an American professional football quarterback for the Jacksonville Jaguars of the National Football League (NFL). He played college football for the Southern Miss Golden Eagles, where he surpassed Brett Favre's single-season school records for passing yardage (4,476) and touchdown passes (38). Mullens was signed by the San Francisco 49ers as an undrafted free agent in 2017 and has also been a member of the Philadelphia Eagles, Cleveland Browns, Las Vegas Raiders, and Minnesota Vikings.

== Early life ==
Mullens was born to Suzanne and Mark Mullens on March 21, 1995, in Little Rock, Arkansas and grew up in Hoover, Alabama, a suburb of Birmingham. He is the grandson of Ernie Tabor, who pitched in the Philadelphia Phillies minor league system in the 1950s. Mullens' uncle, Scott Tabor, pitched for the Arkansas Razorbacks baseball team, and holds the school record for most career wins; he also pitched professionally in the minor leagues. Mullens graduated from Spain Park High School in Hoover.

Mullens played football for Spain Park, emerging as the team's starting quarterback. As a senior in 2012, he threw for 3,649 yards and 40 touchdowns against only seven interceptions en route to winning the 2012 Gatorade Player of the Year award for the state of Alabama. Mullens had totaled 8,605 career passing yards, finishing his high school career with the seventh most passing yards in AHSAA history.

After originally verbally committing to attend the University of Alabama at Birmingham, Mullens changed course on national signing day following a last-minute visit to the University of Southern Mississippi, signing instead with the Golden Eagles.

== College career ==
After starting the 2013 season with a 0–6 record, in an 18-game losing streak, Southern Miss head coach Todd Monken inserted true freshman Mullens as a starter for the home game against the North Texas Mean Green. However, the young team was overmatched by North Texas, suffering a 55–14 loss where Mullens went 12-for-31 passing for 210 yards and a touchdown, while suffering three interceptions and a lost fumble.

In his second collegiate game, a loss to Marshall, Mullens became the first true freshman starting quarterback in Southern Miss history to pass for more than 300 yards in a single game, a feat never accomplished during his freshman year by the school's most famous football alumnus, Brett Favre.

On November 30, 2013, Mullens played a key role in helping Southern Miss end its losing streak at 23 games with a five-touchdown performance against the University of Alabama-Birmingham, which also happened to be the college that he originally committed to.

Mullens passed for 1,776 yards as a freshman in 2013.

As a sophomore in 2014, Mullens started 10 games and completed 218 of 365 attempts for 2,470 yards, 12 touchdowns, and nine interceptions.

In the 2015 regular season, Mullens completed 331 of 521 passes (63.5%) for 4,476 yards and 38 touchdowns – school records for passing yardage and touchdown passes. He ranked sixth among Football Bowl Subdivision quarterbacks in passing yardage. Mullens' efforts were instrumental in a reversal of fortunes of the Southern Miss football program, with the team posting a 9–5 record for the year just two seasons after snapping its abysmal 23-game losing streak. He started all 14 games as the Golden Eagles became the first team in school history to record more than 7,000 yards of total offense.

In 2016, Mullens made 11 starts and completed 243 of 384 attempts for 3,272 yards and 24 touchdowns, averaging 297.5 passing yards per game. On October 1, 2016, against the Rice Owls, he threw for a collegiate career-high 591 yards, four touchdowns, and an interception in the 44–28 victory.

In four seasons at Southern Miss (2013–2016), Mullens played in 44 games (41 starts) and completed 928 of 1,546 attempts for 11,994 yards and 87 touchdowns. He finished his collegiate career as the career passing leader in every statistical category. Mullens' 11,994 yards passing and 87 touchdown passes dwarfed the 7,695 yards and 52 touchdowns registered by former NFL great Brett Favre during his four years with the Golden Eagles.

== Professional career ==
Pre-draft measurables
Height	Weight	Arm length	Hand span	Wingspan	40-yard dash	10-yard split	20-yard split	20-yard shuttle	Three-cone drill	Vertical jump	Broad jump
6 ft 0 7/8 in (1.85 m)	214 lb (97 kg)	30 1/4 in (0.77 m)	9 1/8 in (0.23 m)	6 ft 3 in (1.91 m)	4.90 s	1.65 s	2.84 s	4.47 s	7.40 s	31 in (0.79 m)	8 ft 8 in (2.64 m)
All values from Southern Miss’ Pro Day

=== San Francisco 49ers ===
==== 2017 season ====
On May 4, 2017, Mullens signed with the San Francisco 49ers as an undrafted free agent. He entered training camp as the fourth backup quarterback on the depth chart behind veterans Brian Hoyer and Matt Barkley, and rookie C. J. Beathard.

On September 2, 2017, Mullens was waived as part of the 49ers' final roster cuts, but he was signed to the practice squad the next day. On January 2, 2018, the 49ers signed Mullens to a reserve/futures contract after he spent his entire rookie season on the practice squad.

==== 2018 season ====
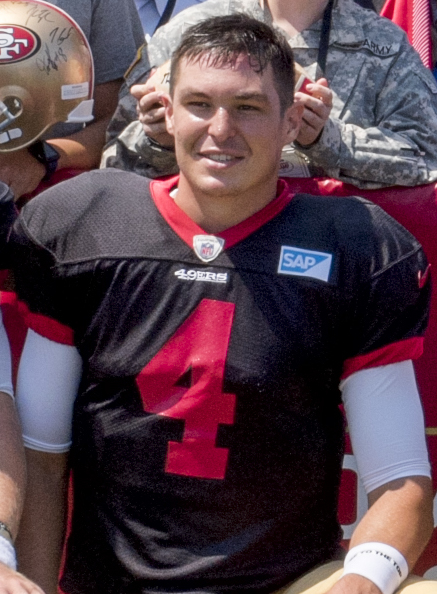
Mullens during training camp in 2018

On September 1, 2018, Mullens was waived by the 49ers and was signed to the practice squad the next day. On September 26, the 49ers promoted Mullens to their active roster after starting quarterback Jimmy Garoppolo tore his ACL and was placed on injured reserve for the rest of the season. The terms of his new contract were for two years and $1.05 million.

External videos
- Nick Mullens throws his first career touchdown
- Nick Mullens’ Week 9 Highlights

On November 1, 2018, Mullens was named the starter for the 49ers' Week 9 game against the Oakland Raiders on Thursday Night Football after Beathard suffered a wrist injury in the previous game against the Arizona Cardinals. Mullens finished his NFL debut and first NFL start completing 16 of 22 pass attempts for 262 yards and three touchdowns as the 49ers won 34–3. His passer rating of 151.9 was the highest since 1970 for a quarterback with at least 20 passing attempts in a debut. Mullens was also the first player in 49ers history to throw three touchdowns in his first game for the team. He completed a 24-yard touchdown pass to wide receiver Pierre Garçon in the first quarter to mark his first NFL touchdown. The following week against the New York Giants, Mullens threw for 250 yards, one touchdown, and was intercepted twice by linebacker B.J. Goodson as the 49ers lost by a score of 27–23 on Monday Night Football. Mullens made his first road start during Week 12. Facing the Tampa Bay Buccaneers, he threw for 221 yards, a touchdown, and two interceptions in the 27–9 loss.

During a Week 13 43–16 road loss to the Seattle Seahawks, Mullens finished with a career-high 414 passing yards, two touchdowns, and an interception. In the next game against the Denver Broncos, he threw for 332 yards, two touchdowns, and an interception during the 20–14 victory. The following week, Mullens threw for 275 yards and a touchdown to help the 49ers defeat the Seahawks in overtime by a score of 26–23, marking the first time the 49ers beat the Seahawks since 2013. In the regular-season finale against the Los Angeles Rams, he finished with 282 passing yards, three touchdowns, and three interceptions during the 48–32 road loss.

Mullens finished the 2018 season with 2,277 passing yards, 13 touchdowns, and 10 interceptions in eight games and starts.

==== 2019 season ====
During the 2019 season, Mullens primarily served as the backup to Jimmy Garoppolo. He only appeared in one game in the 2019 season. The 49ers reached Super Bowl LIV, but the team lost 31–20 to the Kansas City Chiefs.

==== 2020 season ====
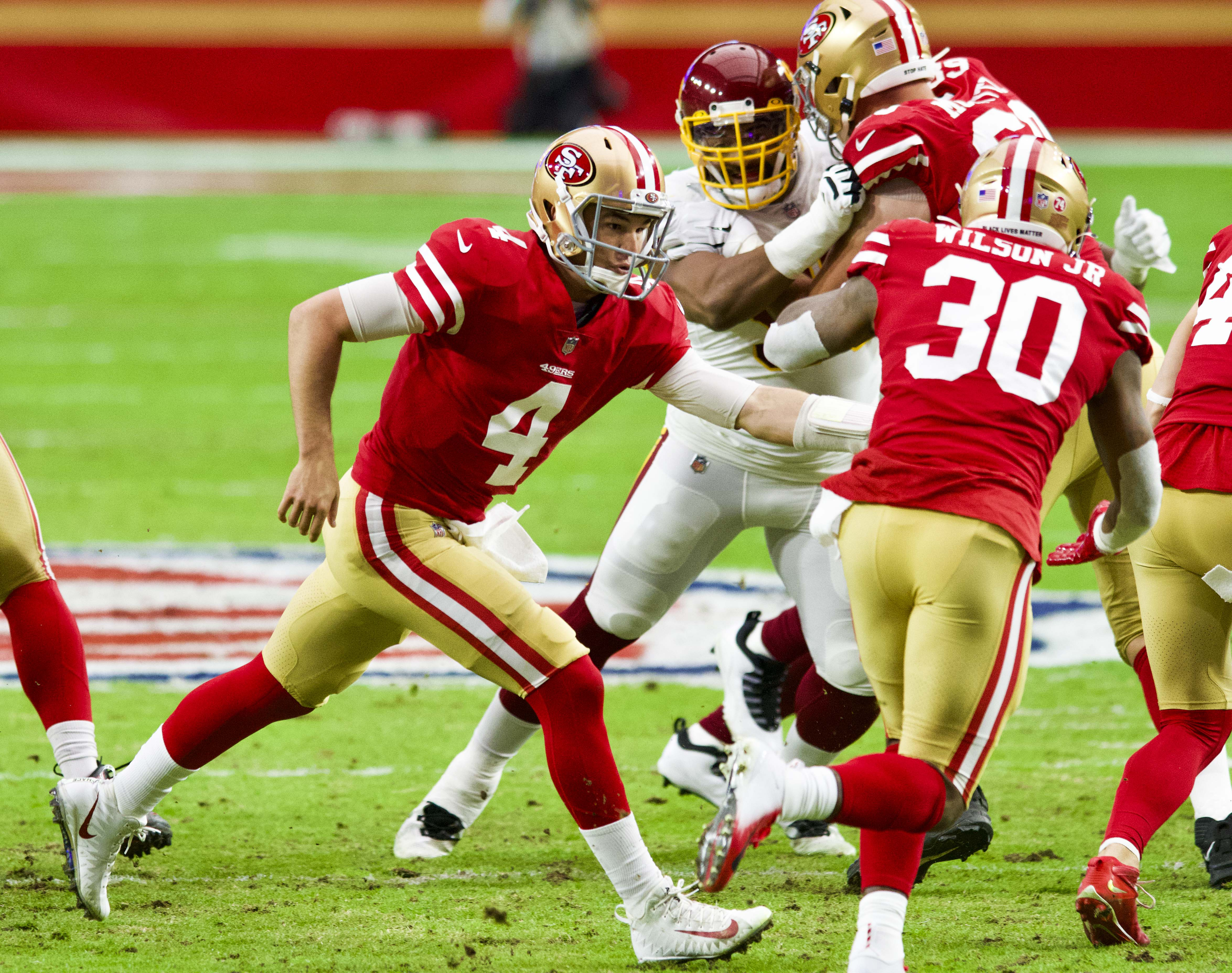
Mullens (#4) playing for the 49ers in 2020.

On March 5, 2020, Mullens was assigned a one-year, $750,000 exclusive-rights free agent tender by the 49ers. He signed the contract on May 1.

During a Week 2 31–13 road victory over the New York Jets, Mullens came in after halftime after Jimmy Garoppolo suffered a leg injury and completed 8 of 11 passes for 71 yards and an interception. Mullens was named the starter for the next game against the Giants. He finished the 36–9 road victory with 343 passing yards and one touchdown. The following week against the Philadelphia Eagles, Mullens posted a career low passer rating of 72.6 in which he threw a pick six to linebacker Alex Singleton, thus resulting in Mullens getting benched for C. J. Beathard. The 49ers went on to lose 25–20 to the Eagles.

During Week 8 against the Seahawks, Mullens came into the game in the fourth quarter after Jimmy Garoppolo left the game with an ankle injury. Mullens rallied the 49ers back in the game by completing 18 of 25 passes for 238 yards and two touchdowns but the 49ers lost 37–27. Mullens was named the starter for the 49ers again for the 49ers' Thursday Night Football game against the Green Bay Packers due to Garoppolo being sidelined indefinitely due to his ankle injury. During Week 13 against the Buffalo Bills, Mullens had 316 passing yards, three touchdowns, and two interceptions in the 34–24 loss.

On December 22, 2020, it was announced that Mullens would miss the rest of the season with an elbow injury he suffered in the Week 15 41–33 road loss to the Dallas Cowboys. He was placed on injured reserve three days later. Mullens was scheduled to become a restricted free agent following the season, but the team did not extend a tender to him at the start of the new league year and Mullens became an unrestricted free agent.

=== Philadelphia Eagles ===
On June 14, 2021, Mullens signed a one-year contract with the Eagles. On August 28, he was waived.

=== Cleveland Browns ===
Mullens was signed to the Cleveland Browns' practice squad on September 1, 2021. He was elevated to the Browns' active roster on October 21 prior to their game that evening, and was reverted to the practice squad the following day.

For the Week 15 matchup against the Las Vegas Raiders, Mullens was named the starting quarterback after the Browns experienced a COVID-19 outbreak, which included fellow quarterbacks Baker Mayfield and Case Keenum testing positive. In addition, the game was moved from Saturday, December 18, to Monday, December 20, the first game of the season to be postponed due to COVID-19. During the game, Mullens threw a touchdown pass late in the fourth quarter, giving the Browns the lead. Derek Carr subsequently led a successful drive down the field, which ended with the Raiders kicking a field goal and winning 16–14. Mullens completed 20 of 30 passes for 147 yards and a touchdown in the loss, and reverted to the practice squad later that week.

=== Las Vegas Raiders ===
Mullens signed with the Raiders on April 4, 2022.

=== Minnesota Vikings ===
On August 22, 2022, the Raiders traded Mullens to the Minnesota Vikings for a 2024 conditional seventh-round pick. In Week 17 against the Green Bay Packers, Mullens relieved Kirk Cousins in a 41–17 loss. In the game, he threw for 57 yards, including a touchdown to K. J. Osborn.

On March 14, 2023, Mullens signed a two-year contract extension with the Vikings. A back injury suffered in Week 5 placed him on injured reserve on October 11. Mullens was activated on November 18.

In Week 14 against the Raiders, Mullens replaced Joshua Dobbs in the fourth quarter and led the Vikings on a 12-play, 56-yard drive which broke the scoreless tie and gave the Vikings a 3–0 victory. Following the victory, the Vikings announced that Mullens would start against the Cincinnati Bengals in Week 15. Mullens made his second start for the Vikings in Week 16 against the Detroit Lions. He threw for 411 yards, two touchdowns, and four interceptions in the 30–24 loss. Following the loss, the Vikings benched Mullens ahead of their Week 17 matchup against the Green Bay Packers in favor of Jaren Hall but re-entered at half-time when they scored just three points. Mullens started again in Week 18 against Detroit, throwing for 396 yards, two touchdowns, and two interceptions in the 30–20 loss.

Mullens opened the 2024 season as the third-string quarterback behind J. J. McCarthy and Sam Darnold, but a season-ending injury in the preseason to McCarthy thrust Mullens into the primary backup role. Darnold started all 17 games and Mullens finished the season completing both his pass attempts in four games played.

=== Jacksonville Jaguars ===
On March 12, 2025, Mullens signed a two-year, $4.5 million contract with the Jacksonville Jaguars to back-up Trevor Lawrence.

On August 30, 2026, Mullens was released by the Jaguars following the team's trade acquisition of Quinn Ewers from the Miami Dolphins; he was re-signed to the Jacksonville's practice squad the next day.

== Career statistics ==
Legend
**Bold**	Career high

=== NFL ===
Year	Team	Games			Passing									Rushing					Sacks		Fumbles	
Year	Team	GP	GS	Record	Cmp	Att	Pct	Yds	Y/A	Lng	TD	Int	Rtg	Att	Yds	Avg	Lng	TD	Sck	SckY	Fum	Lost
2017	SF	0	0	—	DNP																	
2018	SF	8	8	**3−5**	176	274	64.2	2,277	8.3	**85**	**13**	10	90.8	**18**	-16	-0.9	2	0	17	127	2	0
2019	SF	1	0	—	0	0	0.0	0	0.0	0	0	0	0.0	3	-3	-1.0	-1	0	0	0	0	0
2020	SF	10	8	2−6	**211**	**326**	64.7	**2,437**	7.5	49	12	**12**	84.1	9	8	0.9	**7**	0	**19**	**139**	**6**	**4**
2021	CLE	1	1	0−1	20	30	66.7	147	4.9	25	1	0	89.2	0	0	0.0	0	0	0	0	0	0
2022	MIN	4	0	—	21	25	84.0	224	9.0	37	1	1	100.7	4	8	2.0	4	0	0	0	0	0
2023	MIN	5	3	0−3	100	148	67.6	1,306	8.8	47	7	8	88.4	10	**25**	**2.5**	6	0	12	105	2	0
2024	MIN	4	0	—	2	2	**100.0**	38	**19.0**	24	0	0	**118.7**	3	-2	-0.7	0	0	0	0	0	0
2025	JAX	5	0	—	3	3	**100.0**	19	6.3	8	0	0	93.1	12	-8	-0.7	0	0	0	0	0	0
Career		38	20	5−15	533	808	66.0	6,448	8.0	85	34	31	88.3	59	12	0.2	7	0	48	371	10	4

=== College ===
Season	Team	Games			Passing								Rushing			
Season	Team	GP	GS	Record	Comp	Att	Pct	Yds	Avg	TD	Int	Rate	Att	Yds	Avg	TD
2013	Southern Miss	9	6	1–5	136	276	49.3	1,776	6.4	13	**14**	108.7	40	−103	−2.6	2
2014	Southern Miss	10	10	3–7	218	365	59.7	2,470	6.8	12	9	122.5	49	**39**	**0.8**	0
2015	Southern Miss	14	14	**9–5**	**331**	**521**	**63.5**	**4,476**	**8.6**	**38**	12	**155.2**	43	−92	−2.1	3
2016	Southern Miss	11	11	7–4	243	384	63.3	3,272	8.5	24	11	149.8	**51**	−54	−1.1	**4**
Career		44	41	20–21	928	1,546	60.0	11,994	7.8	87	46	137.8	183	−210	−1.1	9

== Personal life ==
On August 30, 2019, Mullens and his wife Haleigh had their first child, a son.
