= Rod Davis (gridiron football) =

American football player (born 1981)

No. 58, 50, 57
- Position: Linebacker

Personal information
- Born: April 2, 1981 (age 45); Gulfport, Mississippi, U.S.
- Listed height: 6 ft 2 in (1.88 m)
- Listed weight: 239 lb (108 kg)

Career information
- High school: Gulfport
- College: Southern Mississippi
- NFL draft: 2004: 5th round, 155th overall pick

Career history
- Minnesota Vikings (2004–2006); Carolina Panthers (2006); Minnesota Vikings (2006); Philadelphia Soul (2008); Edmonton Eskimos (2009–2011); Montreal Alouettes (2012); Calgary Stampeders (2013)

Awards and highlights
- ArenaBowl champion (2008); Second-team All-American (2003); Third-team All-American (2002); C-USA Defensive Player of the Year (2002); Conerly Trophy (2002)

Career NFL statistics
- Tackles: 43
- Forced fumbles: 1
- Fumble recoveries: 1
- Stats at Pro Football Reference
- Stats at CFL.ca (archive)
- Stats at ArenaFan.com

Rod Davis (born April 2, 1981) is an American former professional football player who was a linebacker in the National Football League (NFL) and Canadian Football League (CFL). He was selected in the fifth round of the 2004 NFL draft by the Minnesota Vikings. He played college football for the Southern Mississippi Golden Eagles.

Davis was also a member of the Carolina Panthers, Philadelphia Soul, Edmonton Eskimos, Montreal Alouettes, and Calgary Stampeders.

== Early life ==
Davis played at Central Junior High and Gulfport High School, where he played for the Admirals.

== College career ==
While at the University of Southern Mississippi, Davis recorded four interceptions. Was selected as a First-team All-Conference USA as a sophomore and junior. During his junior year, he had career-highs with 122 tackles and 10.5 sacks, he was also selected as the Conference USA defensive player of the year and a Third-team All-American. He finished his college career with 526 tackles and 18.5 sacks.

In 2002, he won the Conerly Trophy as the best college football player in the state of Mississippi.

== Professional career ==
=== National Football League ===
Davis has played in 40 career NFL games with the Minnesota Vikings and Carolina Panthers, recording 43 tackles with one forced fumble.

In 2004, he played in 14 games and had nine tackles. In 2005 Davis played in 16 games and had 21 tackles and one forced fumble. Davis joined the Panthers and began 2006, with Carolina playing in one game and recording one tackle. He then re-joined the Vikings and played in nine games and recorded 12 tackles.

=== Arena Football League ===
Davis joined the Philadelphia Soul of the Arena Football League in 2008 and won his first professional championship when the Soul won ArenaBowl XXII over the San Jose SaberCats.

=== Canadian Football League ===
Davis signed with the Edmonton Eskimos of the Canadian Football League on May 6, 2009, and played through the 2011 season. His first start came on August 13, 2009, following injuries to Mark Restelli and to Maurice Lloyd.

After becoming a free agent on February 15, 2012, Davis signed with the Montreal Alouettes on February 16, 2012. After playing only one season with the Alouettes, he was released on February 13, 2013.

On February 25, 2013, Davis signed with the Calgary Stampeders.
