= Jeff Kelly (quarterback) =

American football player (born 1979)

Saraland High School
- Title: Head coach

Personal information
- Born: September 7, 1979 (age 47); Deer Park, Alabama, U.S.
- Listed height: 6 ft 1 in (1.85 m)
- Listed weight: 212 lb (96 kg)

Career information
- High school: Citronelle (AL)
- College: Southern Miss (1998–2001)
- NFL draft: 2002: 7th round, 232nd overall pick

Career history

Playing
- Seattle Seahawks (2002)

Coaching
- Satsuma High School (2004–2007) Head coach; Jackson High School (Jackson, AL) (2008–2010) Head coach; Saraland High School (2011–present) Head coach
- Stats at Pro Football Reference

Jeff Kelly (born September 7, 1979) is an American former professional football quarterback in the National Football League (NFL). He was selected by the Seattle Seahawks in the seventh round of the 2002 NFL draft with the 232nd overall pick. He is now the head coach of the Saraland High School Spartans, and has compiled a record of 145–37.

== Head coaching record ==
Year	Team	Overall	Conference	Standing	Bowl/playoffs
Satsuma Gators (AHSAA Class 6A Region 2) (2004–2007)
2004	Satsuma	2–8	1–5	6th	
2005	Satsuma	3–8	2–4	4th	
2006	Satsuma	7–4	4–2	3rd	
2007	Satsuma	3–6	2–4	5th	
Satsuma:		15–26	9–15		
Jackson Aggies (AHSAA Class 4A Region 1) (2008–2010)
2008	Jackson	9–4	6–1	1st	W AHSAA Class 4A Region 1 Championship
2009	Jackson	13–2	6–1	2nd	
2010	Jackson	10–2	6–1	3rd	
Jackson:		32–8	18–3		
Saraland Spartans (AHSAA Class 4A Region 1) (2011)
2011	Saraland	6–5	4–3	4th	
Saraland Spartans (AHSAA Class 5A Region 3) (2012–2013)
2012	Saraland	7–4	5–2	3rd	
2013	Saraland	12–2	6–1	2nd	
Saraland Spartans (AHSAA Class 6A Region 1) (2014–present)
2014	Saraland	13–2	7–1	2nd	
2015	Saraland	8–3	6–2	3rd	
2016	Saraland	6–5	5–3	4th	
2017	Saraland	8–4	5–3	3rd	
2018	Saraland	13–2	7–1	2nd	
2019	Saraland	10–1	8–0	1st	W AHSAA Class 6A Region 1 Championship
2020	Saraland	11–3	6–1	2nd	
2021	Saraland	10–3	7–0	1st	W AHSAA Class 6A Region 1 Championship
2022	Saraland	14–1	7–1	2nd	
2023	Saraland	14–1	8–0	1st	L AHSAA Class 6A Championship
2024	Saraland	13–1	8–0	1st	L AHSAA Class 6A Championship
2025	Saraland	0–0	0–0		
Saraland:		145–37	89–18		
Total:		192–71			
