= UAB Blazers football statistical leaders =

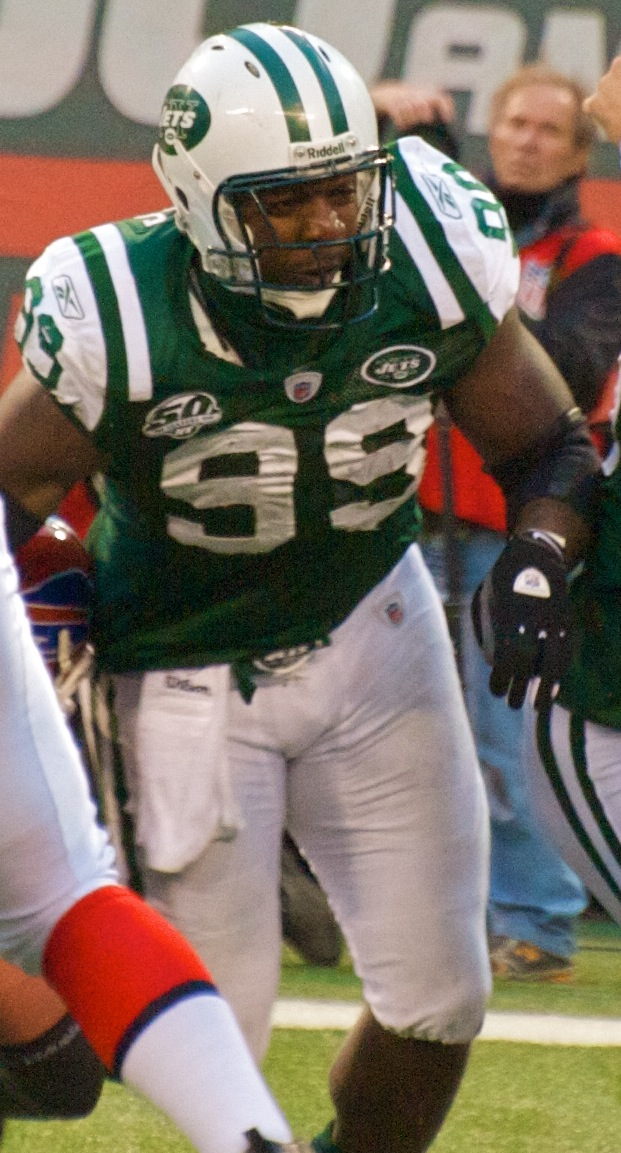
Bryan Thomas holds Blazer career and single-season records in sacks.

The UAB Blazers football statistical leaders are individual statistical leaders of the UAB Blazers football program in various categories, including passing, rushing, receiving, total offense, defensive stats, and kicking. Within those areas, the lists identify single-game, single-season, and career leaders. The Blazers represent the University of Alabama at Birmingham in the NCAA Division I FBS American Conference. The football program returned in 2017 after a two-season hiatus.

UAB began competing in intercollegiate football in 1991. Entries on these lists tend to be dominated by more recent players, however, as regular seasons expanded from 11 to 12 games in 2002-03 and permanently in 2006. Additionally, the Blazers have qualified for seven bowl games—specifically in the 2004 season and in each season from 2017 to 2022 (although their planned 2020 bowl game was canceled due to COVID-19 issues). During UAB's tenure in Conference USA (CUSA) from 1999 to 2014 and 2017–2022, the Blazers also played in the CUSA Championship Game three times (2018–2020), giving the 2018 and 2019 teams a second extra game. Accordingly, those seasons have a disproportionately high amount of entries.

Also of note:

- Due to COVID-19 issues, the NCAA ruled that the 2020 season would not count against the athletic eligibility of any football player, giving everyone who played in that season the opportunity for five years of eligibility instead of the normal four.
- Since 2018, players have been allowed to participate in as many as four games in a redshirt season; previously, playing in even one game "burned" the redshirt. Since 2024, postseason games have not counted against the four-game limit. These changes to redshirt rules have given very recent players several extra games to accumulate statistics.

These lists are updated through the 2025 season.

== Passing ==
=== Passing yards ===
Career
Rk	Player	Yards	Years
1	Darrell Hackney	9,886	2002 2003 2004 2005
2	John Whitcomb	7,420	1992 1993 1994
3	Joe Webb	5,771	2006 2007 2008 2009
4	Tyler Johnston III	4,837	2017 2018 2019 2020 2021
5	Dylan Hopkins	4,750	2019 2021 2022
6	Jalen Kitna	4,671	2024 2025
7	Jacob Zeno	4,666	2022 2023 2024
8	Jonathan Perry	4,454	2011 2012 2013
9	Austin Brown	3,872	2012 2013
10	A. J. Erdely	3,870	2017 2018

Single season
Rk	Player	Yards	Year
1	Darrell Hackney	3,180	2005
2	Jacob Zeno	3,126	2023
3	Darrell Hackney	3,070	2004
4	John Whitcomb	3,031	1994
5	John Whitcomb	3,012	1993
6	Bryan Ellis	2,940	2010
7	Austin Brown	2,673	2012
8	Jalen Kitna	2,462	2025
9	Joe Webb	2,367	2008
10	A. J. Erdely	2,331	2017

Single game
Rk	Player	Yards	Year	Opponent
1	John Whitcomb	539	1994	Prairie View A&M
2	Jacob Zeno	484	2023	Florida Atlantic
3	Darrell Hackney	448	2004	Tulane
4	John Whitcomb	447	1993	Prairie View A&M
5	Darrell Hackney	424	2002	East Carolina
6	Bryan Ellis	418	2010	East Carolina
7	Darrell Hackney	417	2004	Hawaii
8	Jonathan Perry	410	2011	Memphis
9	Austin Brown	409	2012	Tulane
10	Darrell Hackney	407	2005	Southern Miss

=== Passing touchdowns ===
Career
Rk	Player	TDs	Years
1	Darrell Hackney	71	2002 2003 2004 2005
2	John Whitcomb	53	1992 1993 1994
3	Joe Webb	37	2006 2007 2008 2009
	Tyler Johnston III	37	2017 2018 2019 2020 2021
5	Dylan Hopkins	31	2019 2021 2022
	Jacob Zeno	31	2022 2023 2024
7	Jalen Kitna	30	2024 2025
8	Bryan Ellis	27	2008 2009 2010 2011
9	Jonathan Perry	26	2011 2012 2013
10	Austin Brown	24	2012 2013

Single season
Rk	Player	TDs	Year
1	Darrell Hackney	26	2004
2	Bryan Ellis	25	2010
3	John Whitcomb	22	1994
	Darrell Hackney	22	2005
5	John Whitcomb	21	1993
	Joe Webb	21	2009
7	Jacob Zeno	20	2023
8	Dylan Hopkins	18	2021
9	Tyler Johnston III	17	2019
	Jalen Kitna	17	2025

Single game
Rk	Player	TDs	Year	Opponent
1	John Whitcomb	6	1993	Prairie View A&M
	John Whitcomb	6	1994	Prairie View A&M
	Jalen Kitna	6	2024	Tulsa
4	Darrell Hackney	5	2004	TCU
	Bryan Ellis	5	2010	East Carolina
	Jacob Zeno	5	2023	Florida Atlantic
7	Chris Bradford	4	1991	Clinch Valley
	John Whitcomb	4	1993	Butler
	Darrell Hackney	4	2002	Army
	Darrell Hackney	4	2005	UTEP
	Darrell Hackney	4	2005	Memphis
	Joe Webb	4	2009	Florida Atlantic
	Jonathan Perry	4	2011	Memphis
	A. J. Erdely	4	2017	North Texas
	Tyler Johnston III	4	2018	Northern Illinois (Boca Raton Bowl)
	Jacob Zeno	4	2023	South Florida

== Rushing ==
=== Rushing yards ===
Career
Rk	Player	Yards	Years
1	Spencer Brown	4,011	2017 2018 2019 2020
2	DeWayne McBride	3,523	2020 2021 2022
3	Jermaine Brown Jr.	3,078	2019 2020 2021 2022 2023
4	Pat Green	2,817	1991 1992 1993 1994
5	Joe Webb	2,774	2006 2007 2008 2009
6	Jordan Howard	2,468	2013 2014
7	Darrin Reaves	2,337	2011 2012 2013
8	Dan Burks	2,277	2002 2003 2004 2005 2006
9	Jegil Dugger	1,979	1998 1999 2000 2001
10	Corey White	1,925	2003 2004 2005 2006

Single season
Rk	Player	Yards	Year
1	DeWayne McBride	1,713	2022
2	Jordan Howard	1,587	2014
3	Joe Webb	1,427	2009
4	DeWayne McBride	1,371	2021
5	Spencer Brown	1,329	2017
6	Spencer Brown	1,227	2018
7	Carl Sanders	1,154	1996
8	Darrin Reaves	1,037	2012
9	Joe Webb	1,021	2008
10	Jermaine Brown Jr.	948	2022

Single game
Rk	Player	Yards	Year	Opponent
1	DeWayne McBride	272	2022	Louisiana Tech
2	Jordan Howard	262	2014	Southern Miss
3	Carl Sanders	240	1996	Charleston Southern
4	Darrin Reaves	223	2012	Southern Miss
	DeWayne McBride	223	2022	Georgia Southern
6	David Isabelle	214	2010	Florida Atlantic
7	Pat Green	211	1992	Clinch Valley
	Lucious Foster	211	1998	UT–Martin
9	DeWayne McBride	210	2021	Louisiana Tech
10	Spencer Brown	209	2017	Southern Miss

=== Rushing touchdowns ===
Career
Rk	Player	TDs	Years
1	Spencer Brown	41	2017 2018 2019 2020
2	DeWayne McBride	36	2020 2021 2022
3	Pat Green	35	1991 1992 1993 1994
4	Jermaine Brown Jr.	30	2019 2020 2021 2022 2023
5	Darrin Reaves	27	2011 2012 2013
6	Corey White	25	2003 2004 2005 2006
7	Joe Webb	24	2006 2007 2008 2009
8	A. J. Erdely	18	2017 2018
9	Jordan Howard	15	2013 2014
10	Daniel Dixon	13	1997 1998 1999 2000
	Jegil Dugger	13	1998 1999 2000 2001

Single season
Rk	Player	TDs	Year
1	DeWayne McBride	19	2022
2	Spencer Brown	16	2018
3	Darrin Reaves	13	2012
	Jordan Howard	13	2014
	A. J. Erdely	13	2017
	DeWayne McBride	13	2021
7	Darrin Reaves	12	2013
	Jermaine Brown Jr.	12	2023
9	Joe Webb	11	2008
	Joe Webb	11	2009

Single game
Rk	Player	TDs	Year	Opponent
1	D. J. Vinson	5	2014	Alabama A&M
2	DeWayne McBride	4	2021	Louisiana Tech
	DeWayne McBride	4	2022	Georgia Southern
	Jermaine Brown Jr.	4	2023	South Florida
5	Pat Green	3	1991	Hampden-Sydney
	David Thornton	3	1992	Miles
	Pat Green	3	1992	Clinch Valley
	Pat Green	3	1993	Charleston Southern
	Robert Davis	3	1996	Louisiana Tech
	Carl Sanders	3	1996	Charleston Southern
	Corey White	3	2004	South Florida
	Daniel Dixon	3	1997	Southwestern Louisiana
	Corey White	3	2006	Memphis
	Joe Webb	3	2008	Memphis
	Joe Webb	3	2008	Tulane
	David Isabelle	3	2010	Florida Atlantic
	Darrin Reaves	3	2012	Tulsa
	Darrin Reaves	3	2012	Tulane
	A. J. Erdely	3	2017	Ball State
	Spencer Brown	3	2017	Rice
	Spencer Brown	3	2018	North Texas
	Spencer Brown	3	2020	South Alabama
	Jermaine Brown Jr.	3	2021	UTEP
	DeWayne McBride	3	2022	Middle Tennessee
	DeWayne McBride	3	2022	North Texas
	Rod Robinson II	3	2026	Temple

== Receiving ==
=== Receptions ===
Career
Rk	Player	Rec	Years
1	Derrick Ingram	207	1991 1992 1993 1994
2	Frantrell Forrest	164	2007 2008 2009 2010
3	Roddy White	163	2001 2002 2003 2004
4	Jackie Williams	140	2010 2011 2012
5	Cedrick Buchannon	116	1992 1993 1994 1995
	J. J. Nelson	116	2011 2012 2013 2014
7	Amare Thomas	115	2023 2024
8	Patrick Hearn	110	2009 2010 2011 2012
9	Austin Watkins	98	2018 2019 2020
10	Iverson Hooks	97	2022 2023 2024 2025

Single season
Rk	Player	Rec	Year
1	Derrick Ingram	83	1994
2	Derrick Ingram	76	1993
3	Iverson Hooks	72	2025
4	Roddy White	71	2004
5	Amare Thomas	62	2024
	Kam Shanks	62	2024
7	Jackie Williams	58	2011
8	Austin Watkins	57	2019
9	Andre Wilson	54	2017
10	Reggie Lindsey	53	2005
	Amare Thomas	53	2023

Single game
Rk	Player	Rec	Year	Opponent
1	Manuel Philpott	13	1991	Hampden-Sydney
2	Derrick Ingram	12	1993	Prairie View A&M
	Derrick Ingram	12	1994	Prairie View A&M
	Willie Quinnie	12	2002	Army
5	Frantrell Forrest	11	2008	Florida Atlantic
	Pat Shed	11	2011	East Carolina
	Iverson Hooks	11	2025	Memphis
8	Roddy White	10	2003	Southern Miss
	Roddy White	10	2004	Tulane
	Rashaud Slaughter	10	2006	SMU
	Jackie Williams	10	2011	UCF
	J. J. Nelson	10	2013	Troy
	Collin Lisa	10	2018	Savannah State
	Iverson Hooks	10	2025	South Florida

=== Receiving yards ===
Career
Rk	Player	Yards	Years
1	Derrick Ingram	3,379	1991 1992 1993 1994
2	Roddy White	3,112	2001 2002 2003 2004
3	J. J. Nelson	2,273	2011 2012 2013 2014
4	Frantrell Forrest	2,215	2007 2008 2009 2010
5	Trea Shropshire	1,936	2020 2021 2022
6	Jackie Williams	1,733	2010 2011 2012
7	Cedrick Buchannon	1,694	1992 1993 1994 1995
8	Austin Watkins	1,642	2018 2019 2020
9	Darrius Malone	1,596	1996 1997 1998 1999
10	Tejhaun Palmer	1,409	2021 2022 2023

Single season
Rk	Player	Yards	Year
1	Derrick Ingram	1,457	1994
2	Roddy White	1,452	2004
3	Derrick Ingram	1,115	1993
4	Austin Watkins	1,092	2019
5	Reggie Lindsey	978	2005
6	Iverson Hooks	927	2025
7	Trea Shropshire	923	2022
8	Tejhaun Palmer	858	2023
9	J. J. Nelson	846	2013
10	Roddy White	844	2003

Single game
Rk	Player	Yards	Year	Opponent
1	Derrick Ingram	289	1994	Prairie View A&M
2	Roddy White	253	2004	Tulane
3	Xavier Ubosi	227	2018	Northern Illinois (Boca Raton Bowl)
4	Patrick Hearn	201	2012	UCF
5	J. J. Nelson	199	2013	Troy
6	Derrick Ingram	194	1993	Butler
7	Trea Shropshire	193	2022	Middle Tennessee
8	Kevin Drake	187	1997	Tennessee Tech
9	Derrick Ingram	186	1994	Jacksonville State
10	Reggie Lindsey	184	2005	SMU

=== Receiving touchdowns ===
Career
Rk	Player	TDs	Years
1	Derrick Ingram	28	1991 1992 1993 1994
2	Roddy White	26	2001 2002 2003 2004
3	Frantrell Forrest	20	2007 2008 2009
	J. J. Nelson	20	2011 2012 2013 2014
5	Reggie Lindsey	15	2004 2005
	Gerrit Prince	15	2018 2019 2020 2021
	Trea Shropshire	15	2020 2021 2022
8	Cedrick Buchannon	14	1992 1993 1994 1995
9	Andre Wilson	11	2017 2018
	Amare Thomas	11	2023 2024

Single season
Rk	Player	TDs	Year
1	Roddy White	14	2004
2	Derrick Ingram	13	1994
3	Reggie Lindsey	11	2005
4	Gerrit Prince	10	2021
5	Frantrell Forrest	9	2009
6	Derrick Ingram	8	1993
	J. J. Nelson	8	2013
	Xavier Ubosi	8	2018
	Amare Thomas	8	2024
10	Kevin Drake	7	1997
	Roddy White	7	2003
	Trea Shropshire	7	2021
	Tejhaun Palmer	7	2023
	Iverson Hooks	7	2025

Single game
Rk	Player	TDs	Year	Opponent
1	Derrick Ingram	4	1994	Prairie View A&M
2	Willie Quinnie	3	2002	Army
	Roddy White	3	2004	Memphis
	Reggie Lindsey	3	2005	UTEP
	Mike Jones	3	2010	Southern Miss
	Xavier Ubosi	3	2018	Northern Illinois (Boca Raton Bowl)
	Kam Shanks	3	2024	Tulsa
	Iverson Hooks	3	2025	Memphis

== Total offense ==
Total offense is the sum of passing and rushing statistics. It does not include receiving or returns.

=== Total offense yards ===
Career
Rk	Player	Yards	Years
1	Darrell Hackney	9,978	2002 2003 2004 2005
2	Joe Webb	8,545	2006 2007 2008 2009
3	John Whitcomb	6,976	1992 1993 1994
4	Tyler Johnston III	5,503	2017 2018 2019 2020 2021
5	Dylan Hopkins	5,102	2019 2021 2022
6	Jonathan Perry	5,094	2011 2012 2013
7	Jacob Zeno	5,025	2022 2023 2024
8	Jalen Kitna	4,571	2024 2025
9	A. J. Erdely	4,405	2017 2018
10	Spencer Brown	4,011	2017 2018 2019 2020

Single season
Rk	Player	Yards	Year
1	Joe Webb	3,726	2009
2	Joe Webb	3,388	2008
3	Jacob Zeno	3,294	2023
4	Darrell Hackney	3,285	2005
5	Darrell Hackney	3,056	2004
6	Bryan Ellis	2,969	2010
7	John Whitcomb	2,846	1993
8	John Whitcomb	2,837	1994
9	A. J. Erdely	2,652	2017
10	Tyler Johnston III	2,497	2019

Single game
Rk	Player	Yards	Year	Opponent
1	John Whitcomb	533	1994	Prairie View A&M
2	Jacob Zeno	494	2023	Florida Atlantic
3	Joe Webb	459	2009	UCF
4	Jonathan Perry	457	2011	Memphis
5	John Whitcomb	447	1993	Prairie View A&M
6	Darrell Hackney	441	2004	Tulane
7	Darrell Hackney	440	2005	Southern Miss
8	Joe Webb	430	2009	Memphis
9	Darrell Hackney	420	2004	Hawaii
10	Jalen Kitna	419	2024	Tulsa

=== Total touchdowns ===
Career
Rk	Player	TDs	Years
1	Darrell Hackney	77	2002 2003 2004 2005
2	Joe Webb	61	2006 2007 2008 2009
3	John Whitcomb	53	1992 1993 1994
4	Tyler Johnston III	42	2017 2018 2019 2020 2021
5	A. J. Erdely	41	2017 2018
	Spencer Brown	41	2017 2018 2019 2020
7	Dylan Hopkins	39	2019 2021 2022
8	DeWayne McBride	36	2020 2021 2022
	Jacob Zeno	36	2022 2023 2024
10	Pat Green	35	1991 1992 1993 1994

Single season
Rk	Player	TDs	Year
1	Joe Webb	32	2009
2	A. J. Erdely	29	2017
3	Darrell Hackney	28	2004
	Darrell Hackney	28	2005
5	Bryan Ellis	27	2010
6	Jacob Zeno	24	2023
7	Dylan Hopkins	23	2021
8	John Whitcomb	22	1994
9	John Whitcomb	21	1993
	Joe Webb	21	2008

Single game
Rk	Player	TDs	Year	Opponent
1	John Whitcomb	6	1993	Prairie View A&M
	John Whitcomb	6	1994	Prairie View A&M
	Joe Webb	6	2009	Florida Atlantic
	Jalen Kitna	6	2024	Tulsa
5	Darrell Hackney	5	2004	TCU
	Bryan Ellis	5	2010	East Carolina
	Jacob Zeno	5	2023	Florida Atlantic

== Defense ==
=== Interceptions ===
Career
Rk	Player	Ints	Years
1	Don Blackmon	16	1991 1992 1993 1994
2	Kevin Sanders	15	2005 2006 2007 2008
3	Rodregis Brooks	14	1996 1997 1998 1999 2000
4	Tommy Harrison	10	1991 1992 1993 1994
5	Dainon Sidney	9	1996 1997
	Chris Brown	9	1999 2000 2001 2002
	Grayson Cash	9	2017 2018 2019 2020 2021 2022
8	Will Dunbar	8	2005 2006 2007 2008
9	Izell Reese	7	1994 1995 1996 1997
	Wes Foss	7	1998 1999 2000 2001
	Marquis Coleman	7	2008 2009 2010 2011

Single season
Rk	Player	Ints	Year
1	Rodregis Brooks	9	1999
2	Don Blackmon	7	1993
	Kevin Sanders	7	2008
4	Don Blackmon	5	1991
	Tommy Harrison	5	1993
	Dainon Sidney	5	1996
	Darious Williams	5	2017
8	Jody Evans	4	1993
	Izell Reese	4	1994
	Dainon Sidney	4	1997
	Dwight Platt	4	1998
	Chris Brown	4	2002

Single game
Rk	Player	Ints	Year	Opponent
1	Don Blackmon	3	1992	Lane

=== Tackles ===
Career
Rk	Player	Tackles	Years
1	Marvin Burdette	406	2009 2010 2011 2012
2	Zac Woodfin	372	2001 2002 2003 2004
3	Noah Wilder	337	2019 2020 2021 2022
4	Nigel Eldridge	321	2001 2002 2003 2004
5	Joe Henderson	294	2005 2006 2007 2008
6	Will Dunbar	290	2005 2006 2007 2008
7	Alan Willis	289	1994 1995 1996 1997
8	Izell Reese	276	1994 1995 1996 1997
9	Josh Evans	274	1991 1992 1993 1994
10	Wayne White	266	1991 1992 1993 1994

Single season
Rk	Player	Tackles	Year
1	Marvin Burdette	157	2012
2	Zac Woodfin	149	2003
3	Nigel Eldridge	128	2003
4	Will Dunbar	122	2007
5	Zac Woodfin	120	2002
6	Jamie Bender	119	2011
7	Brian Smith	114	1997
	Marvin Burdette	114	2010
9	Rod Taylor	110	2001
10	Joe Henderson	109	2007
	Noah Wilder	109	2022

Single game
Rk	Player	Tackles	Year	Opponent
1	Marvin Burdette	24	2012	Tulane
2	Josh Evans	21	1992	Tennessee Wesleyan
3	Perry Collier	20	1995	Middle Tennessee
	Rod Taylor	20	2001	Southern Miss
	Marvin Burdette	20	2010	Marshall
6	Izell Reese	18	1995	Western Kentucky
	Nigel Eldridge	18	2003	TCU
	Noah Wilder	18	2022	Georgia Southern
	Reynard Ellis	18	2022	Louisiana Tech

=== Sacks ===
During UAB's 2015–2016 football hiatus, the UAB Record Book did not list any sacks records. The 2013 UAB football media guide recorded top performances in sacks, and the 2018 media guide also does so.

Career
Rk	Player	Sacks	Years
1	Bryan Thomas	36.0	1998 1999 2000 2001
2	Rodney Foster	29.0	1991 1992 1993 1994
3	Larry McSwain	23.0	2004 2005 2006
4	Josh Evans	20.0	1991 1992 1993 1994
	Robert Leslie	20.0	1993 1994 1995
6	Diaheem Watkins	18.5	2011 2012 2013 2014
7	Bryant Turner	18.0	2007 2008 2009 2010
8	Eddie Freeman	16.0	1998 1999 2000 2001
9	Jordan Smith	14.5	2019 2020
10	Jermaine McElveen	14.0	2003 2004 2005

Single season
Rk	Player	Sacks	Year
1	Bryan Thomas	14.0	2001
2	Robert Leslie	13.0	1995
	Larry McSwain	13.0	2004
4	Rodney Foster	12.0	1993
5	Marlin Dean	11.5	2026
6	Bryan Thomas	10.0	2000
	Diaheem Watkins	10.0	2014
	Jordan Smith	10.0	2019
9	Jamell Garcia-Williams	9.5	2018
10	Josh Evans	9.0	1993
	Kristopher Moll	9.0	2019

Single game
Rk	Player	Sacks	Year	Opponent
1	Rodney Foster	4.0	1991	Washington & Lee
	Josh Evans	4.0	1993	Butler

== Kicking ==
=== Field goals made ===
Career
Rk	Player	FGs	Years
1	Ty Long	59	2011 2012 2013 2014
2	Nick Hayes	57	2001 2002 2003 2004
3	Swayze Waters	50	2005 2006 2007 2008
4	Nick Vogel	47	2017 2018 2019
	Matt Quinn	47	2020 2021 2022 2023
6	Kevin Thomason	39	1992 1993 1994 1995
7	Jonah Delange	31	2024 2025
8	Rhett Gallego	30	1998 1999 2000 2001
9	Jake Arians	29	1996 1997 1998 1999

Single season
Rk	Player	FGs	Year
1	Swayze Waters	22	2007
2	Jonah Delange	21	2024
3	Rhett Gallego	19	2000
	Swayze Waters	19	2008
	Nick Vogel	19	2019
6	Nick Hayes	17	2002
	Nick Hayes	17	2003
8	Ty Long	16	2011
	Ty Long	16	2013
10	Kevin Thomason	15	1993
	Nick Vogel	15	2018

Single game
Rk	Player	FGs	Year	Opponent
1	Swayze Waters	5	2007	Alcorn State
	Swayze Waters	5	2008	UCF
3	Rhett Gallego	4	2000	Louisiana–Lafayette
	Jonah Delange	4	2024	South Florida
	Jonah Delange	4	2026	UL Monroe
	Jonah Delange	4	2026	Samford

=== Field goal percentage ===
Career
Rk	Player	FG%	Years
1	Jonah Delange	81.6%	2024 2025
2	Swayze Waters	78.1%	2006 2007 2008
3	Ty Long	77.6%	2011 2012 2013 2014
4	Nick Hayes	77.0%	2001 2002 2003 2004
5	Nick Vogel	73.4%	2017 2018 2019
6	Parker Mullins	72.7%	2003 2004 2005 2006
7	Matt Quinn	72.3%	2020 2021 2022 2023
8	Rhett Gallego	71.4%	1998 1999 2000 2001
9	Kevin Thomason	68.4%	1992 1993 1994 1995

Single season
Rk	Player	FG%	Year
1	Rhett Gallego	100.0%	1998
	Rhett Gallego	100.0%	2001
3	Matt Quinn	91.7%	2020
4	Jonah Delange	87.5%	2024
5	Nick Hayes	85.0%	2003
6	Ty Long	84.2%	2011
7	Nick Vogel	82.6%	2019
8	Ty Long	82.4%	2012
9	Jake Arians	80.0%	1999
10	Rhett Gallego	79.2%	2000
	Swayze Waters	79.2%	2008
