= List of UAB Blazers football seasons =

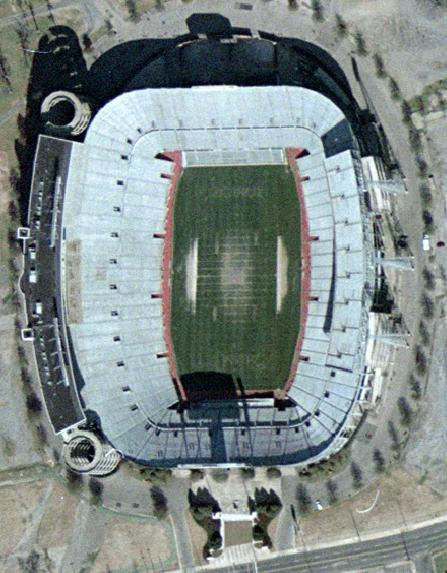
Legion Field, former home of the UAB Blazers

The UAB Blazers college football team competes as part of the National Collegiate Athletic Association (NCAA) Division I Football Bowl Subdivision, and represents the University of Alabama at Birmingham (UAB) in the American Athletic Conference (AAC). Through the 2024 season, the Blazers played their home games at Protective Stadium in Birmingham, Alabama. Since their inaugural 1991 season, the Blazers have played in 373 games, and entering the 2025 season, they have compiled an all-time record of 171 wins, 193 losses and 2 ties, and appeared in six bowl games. The Blazers qualified for a fifth bowl game in 2020, but that game was canceled amid COVID-19.

For the 1991–92 seasons, UAB competed as a Division III independent, unaffiliated with a conference. As a Division III school, the Blazers compiled an overall record of 11 wins, 6 losses, and 2 ties before moving up to Division I-AA for the 1993 season. As a Division I-AA independent for the 1993 through 1995 seasons, UAB compiled an overall record of 21 wins and 12 losses before they moved up to Division I-A. The Blazers entered the 1996 season as an I-A independent, and in their first I-A game, UAB lost to in-state rival Auburn 29–0. They finished their first I-A season with 5 wins and 6 losses. Already a participating member of Conference USA in other sports, on November 13, 1996, UAB was admitted to the league as a football playing member effective the 1999 season.

The longest tenured head coach of the Blazers was Watson Brown who led UAB for 12 seasons between 1995 and 2006. Brown coached the Blazers to their first bowl game in the 2004 Hawaii Bowl and led the team to an overall record of 62 wins and 74 losses before he resigned after the 2006 season. After Bill Clark led UAB to a record of six wins and six losses in his first season as head coach, on December 3, 2014, university president Ray Watts announced the elimination of the football program effective at the end of the 2014–15 season. However, due to major public outcry, followed by a significant fundraising drive, UAB announced within six months that the football program would be reinstated, with play restarting in 2017.

== Seasons ==
| Bowl eligible | Bowl game berth ^ |

List of seasons showing head coach, conference, conference finish, division finish, wins, losses, ties, bowl games and final poll standings (Note: Statistics correct as of the end of the 2020 season.)
| Season | Head coach | Conference | Conference finish | Division finish | Wins | Losses | Ties | Post–season result | AP poll (Note: The Associated Press began conducting a weekly college football poll in 1936.) | Coaches Poll (Note: The college football coaches' poll has been sponsored by multiple organizations since its creation in 1950. Its current sponsor is USA Today) |
|---|---|---|---|---|---|---|---|---|---|---|
| 1991 | Jim Hilyer | NCAA Division III independent | — | — | 4 | 3 | 2 | — | N/A | N/A |
| 1992 | Jim Hilyer | NCAA Division III independent | — | — | 7 | 3 | 0 | — | N/A | N/A |
| 1993 | Jim Hilyer | NCAA Division I-AA independent | — | — | 9 | 2 | 0 | — | N/A | N/A |
| 1994 | Jim Hilyer | NCAA Division I-AA independent | — | — | 7 | 4 | 0 | — | N/A | N/A |
| 1995 | Watson Brown | NCAA Division I-AA independent | — | — | 5 | 6 | 0 | — | N/A | N/A |
| 1996 | Watson Brown | NCAA Division I-A independent | — | — | 5 | 6 | — | — | — | — |
| 1997 | Watson Brown | NCAA Division I-A independent | — | — | 5 | 6 | — | — | — | — |
| 1998 | Watson Brown | NCAA Division I-A independent | — | — | 4 | 7 | — | — | — | — |
| 1999 | Watson Brown | Conference USA | T–2nd | — | 5 | 6 | — | — | — | — |
| 2000 | Watson Brown | Conference USA | T–5th | — | 7 | 4 | — | — | — | — |
| 2001 | Watson Brown | Conference USA | T–2nd | — | 6 | 5 | — | — | — | — |
| 2002 | Watson Brown | Conference USA | T–5th | — | 5 | 7 | — | — | — | — |
| 2003 | Watson Brown | Conference USA | T–6th | — | 5 | 7 | — | — | — | — |
| 2004 | Watson Brown | Conference USA | T–2nd | — | 7 | 5 | — | Lost Hawaii Bowl to Hawaii Warriors, 40–59^ | — | — |
| 2005 | Watson Brown | Conference USA | — | T–5th | 5 | 6 | — | — | — | — |
| 2006 | Watson Brown | Conference USA | — | 5th | 3 | 9 | — | — | — | — |
| 2007 | Neil Callaway | Conference USA | — | 6th | 2 | 10 | — | — | — | — |
| 2008 | Neil Callaway | Conference USA | — | T–4th | 4 | 8 | — | — | — | — |
| 2009 | Neil Callaway | Conference USA | — | T–4th | 5 | 7 | — | — | — | — |
| 2010 | Neil Callaway | Conference USA | — | 5th | 4 | 8 | — | — | — | — |
| 2011 | Neil Callaway | Conference USA | — | T–4th | 3 | 9 | — | — | — | — |
| 2012 | Garrick McGee | Conference USA | — | 5th | 3 | 9 | — | — | — | — |
| 2013 | Garrick McGee | Conference USA | — | T–5th | 2 | 10 | — | — | — | — |
| 2014 | Bill Clark | Conference USA | — | T–3rd | 6 | 6 | — | — | — | — |
| 2017 | Bill Clark | Conference USA | — | T–2nd | 8 | 5 | — | Lost Bahamas Bowl to Ohio Bobcats, 6–41^ | — | — |
| 2018 | Bill Clark | Conference USA | 1st | 1st | 11 | 3 | — | Won Conference USA Football Championship vs. Middle Tennessee Blue Raiders, 27–25; Won Boca Raton Bowl vs. Northern Illinois Huskies, 37–13^ | — | — |
| 2019 | Bill Clark | Conference USA | 2nd | T–1st | 9 | 5 | — | Lost Conference USA Football Championship vs. Florida Atlantic Owls, 6–49; Lost New Orleans Bowl vs. Appalachian State Mountaineers, 17–31^ | — | — |
| 2020 | Bill Clark | Conference USA | 1st | 1st | 6 | 3 | — | Won Conference USA Football Championship vs. Marshall Thundering Herd, 22–13; Gasparilla Bowl vs. South Carolina Gamecocks – canceled | — | — |
| 2021 | Bill Clark | Conference USA | — | 2nd | 9 | 4 | — | Won Independence Bowl vs. BYU Cougars, 31-28^ | RV | — |
| 2022 | Bryant Vincent (Interim) | Conference USA | T–4th | – | 7 | 6 | — | Won Bahamas Bowl vs. Miami RedHawks, 24-20^ | — | — |
| 2023 | Trent Dilfer | American Conference | T–8th | – | 4 | 8 | — | — | — | — |
| 2024 | Trent Dilfer | American Conference | T–11th | – | 3 | 9 | — | — | — | — |
| 2025 | Trent Dilfer (first 6 games) Alex Mortensen (final 6 games as Interim) | American Conference | T-11th | – | 4 | 8 | – | – | – | – |

== Totals ==
| | Wins | Losses | Ties | Win percentage |
|---|---|---|---|---|
| Regular-season games | 171 | 193 | 2 | .470 |
| Bowl games | 4 | 3 | 0 | .571 |
| All games | 175 | 196 | 2 | .472 |
