= 2022 Bahamas Bowl =

Postseason college football bowl game

2022 HomeTown Lenders Bahamas Bowl
- 8th Bahamas Bowl
Miami RedHawks	UAB Blazers
(6–6)	(6–6)
MAC	C–USA
20	24
Head coach: Chuck Martin	Head coach: Bryant Vincent (interim)
	1	2	3	4	Total
Miami	0	6	7	7	20
UAB	10	0	0	14	24
- Date: December 16, 2022
- Season: 2022
- Stadium: Thomas Robinson Stadium
- Location: Nassau, Bahamas
- MVP: Offense: Trea Shropshire (WR, UAB); Defense: Michael Fairbanks II (OLB, UAB)
- Favorite: UAB by 10.5
- Referee: Tim Davis (Mountain West)
- Attendance: 12,172
- Payout: US$225,000

United States TV coverage
- Network: ESPN
- Announcers: Steve Levy (play-by-play), Joey Galloway (analyst), and Kris Budden (sideline)

International TV coverage
- Network: ESPN Brazil
- Announcers: Matheus Suman (play-by-play) and Deivis Chiodini (analyst)

The 2022 Bahamas Bowl was a college football bowl game played on December 16, 2022, at Thomas Robinson Stadium in Nassau, Bahamas. The eighth annual Bahamas Bowl, the game featured the UAB Blazers, from Conference USA, and the Miami RedHawks, from the Mid-American Conference. The game began at 11:35 a.m. EST and aired on ESPN. It was the first of the 2022–23 bowl games concluding the 2022 FBS football season. Sponsored by mortgage lender HomeTown Lenders, it was officially known as the HomeTown Lenders Bahamas Bowl.

UAB's offense started the game well, scoring on both of their first two drives with a 10-yard touchdown pass on the first and a 42-yard field goal on the second. Miami, after punting on three of their first four drives, put together a 65-yard touchdown drive that concluded with 34 seconds remaining in the second quarter, though they trailed by four points at the half due to a blocked extra point. After forcing UAB's offense into a turnover on downs to begin the third quarter, Miami went three-and-out and punted but recovered the ball on the UAB 4-yard-line after the punt was muffed by UAB, allowing them to score on their next play. The teams traded touchdowns to begin the fourth quarter, and Miami missed a field goal after recovering a UAB fumble on UAB's 28-yard-line. UAB scored a touchdown on their ensuing drive, and Miami was unable to respond, as they came up two yards short of the end zone on the game's final play, securing a 24–20 win for UAB.

== Teams ==
The Bahamas Bowl featured the UAB Blazers, from Conference USA (C–USA), and the Miami RedHawks, from the Mid-American Conference (MAC). This was the first meeting between UAB and Miami.

=== UAB ===
After six years leading the UAB football program, head coach Bill Clark resigned in June 2022, leading the university to elevate offensive coordinator and quarterbacks coach Bryant Vincent to the role of interim head coach for the 2022 season. Vincent's first game in charge saw the Blazers host Alabama A&M, whom they defeated in a 59–0 shutout. UAB fell to Liberty in their first road game but returned home to beat Georgia Southern by two scores the following week. After a bye week, the Blazers began conference play with a road trip to Rice but fell by four points. The Blazers responded with their first two conference wins, both at home: against Middle Tennessee, by 27 points, and over Charlotte, by 14 points. UAB then lost consecutive road games against Western Kentucky and Florida Atlantic, each by a field goal. Their losing skid continued as they lost to UTSA by six points in double overtime, though they rebounded the following week with a win against North Texas. After suffering a 31-point loss in their final non-conference game at No. 6 LSU, UAB earned their sixth win and bowl eligibility in their final regular season contest at Louisiana Tech. They accepted their Bahamas Bowl bid on November 26; they entered the game with a record of 6–6 and a 4–4 mark in C–USA play.

This was the sixth bowl appearance for UAB, who were 2–3 in prior appearances. It was the second Bahamas Bowl appearance for the Blazers after losing the 2017 edition to Ohio by a score of 41–6; the Blazers will join Middle Tennessee and Toledo as the only teams to play in multiple Bahamas Bowls. In addition, this bowl was UAB's final game as a member of Conference USA before moving to the American Athletic Conference in 2023.

=== Miami ===
The Miami RedHawks began head coach Chuck Martin's ninth season at the helm with all four of their non-conference games played consecutively, starting with a road trip to Kentucky that resulted in a loss for Miami by 24 points. They defeated FCS Robert Morris in their home opener before traveling to rivals Cincinnati, where they lost by three touchdowns. The RedHawks returned to .500 to close out non-conference play with a defeat of Northwestern on the road by three points. They continued their pattern of alternating wins and losses as they entered MAC play to begin the month of October, falling to Buffalo before returning home to defeat Kent State. Miami lost two consecutive games for the first time starting the next week, as both Bowling Green and Western Michigan got the best of the RedHawks, dropping them to 3–5. They earned a second conference win at Akron to finish October but dropped their sixth game at home to Ohio following a bye week. Needing two wins in their final two games in order to make a bowl game, they defeated Northern Illinois and entered the game against Ball State with an identical record to that of the Cardinals. It was announced prior to the start of the game that the winner would receive a bid to the Bahamas Bowl, and Miami won 18–17 in a 4th quarter comeback to achieve bowl eligibility. Miami entered the game with a record of 6–6, and a 4–4 mark in MAC play.

This was the fourteenth bowl appearance for Miami, who were 8–5 in prior appearances; their last bowl game was the 2021 Frisco Football Classic. It was their fourth bowl appearance under Chuck Martin, under whom the RedHawks had won one bowl and lost two. It was the first Bahamas Bowl appearance for the RedHawks.

== Game summary ==
The Bahamas Bowl was televised by ESPN, and had a commentary team of Steve Levy, Joey Galloway, and Kris Budden. The ESPN Radio broadcast featured commentators Kevin Winter and Freddie Coleman. The game's Mountain West Conference officiating crew was led by referee Tim Davis and umpire Rico Orsot. Played at Thomas Robinson Stadium in Nassau, Bahamas, the game's weather at kickoff was sunny with a temperature of 81 °F (27 °C).

=== First half ===
Scheduled for an 11:30 a.m. EST start, the Bahamas Bowl began at 11:35 a.m. with Reese Burkhardt's opening kickoff resulting in a touchback, and Miami began their first possession at their own 25-yard-line. They gained a first down on their first play, as quarterback Aveon Smith passed to wide receiver Jack Coldiron for a 15-yard gain, and the RedHawks converted a third down with another 15-yard pass a few plays later. This gave them 1st & 10 at the UAB 40-yard-line, but a trio of rushes gaining a total of eight yards forced a decision by the coaching staff on 4th & 2. They opted to go for it but were unsuccessful after Smith's pass to Kevin Davis was incomplete. This turnover on downs gave UAB the ball at their own 32-yard-line, and the Blazers started their first drive with a 46-yard pass from Dylan Hopkins to Trea Shropshire. They entered the red zone on the next play with a 4-yard pass to the Miami 18-yard-line. Several plays later, on 2nd & Goal, Hopkins passed to Shropshire again for a 10-yard-touchdown, giving the Blazers the first points of the game. Placekicker Matt Quinn converted the extra point to make it 7–0 UAB. Another touchback gave Miami the ball at their own 25-yard-line to begin again, but their offense was less successful this time around as they gained only four yards and went three-and-out, with Dom Dzioban's punt fair caught at the UAB 30-yard-line. The Blazers offense saw success again on their first play; despite only gaining five yards, another fifteen were added due to an unnecessary roughness penalty called against Miami's Ja'Von Kimpson. This put the ball at midfield, and UAB picked up two first downs within the next five plays. They reached the Miami 26-yard-line before facing 3rd & 9, which they did not convert; Quinn made a 42-yard field goal on fourth down to conclude the drive and push UAB's lead to ten points. Miami's third drive of the game started with a pair of rushes for four and three yards, respectively, but a sack by Nikia Eason Jr. on Smith lost the RedHawks seven yards and forced their second punt of the game on 4th & 10. A return of no gain put the ball on the UAB 32-yard-line. The Blazers offense started quickly again, with back-to-back first downs to begin the drive on a 16-yard pass and a defensive holding penalty, putting them in Miami territory. A 2-yard rush by Lee Witherspoon put the ball on the Miami 40-yard-line and ended the game's first quarter.

UAB converted 3rd & 2 with a 3-yard Hopkins rush within the first few plays of the second quarter. They faced 2nd & 7 from the Miami 28-yard-line after the next play but turned the ball over on downs after three consecutive incomplete passes from Hopkins. Miami moved the ball into UAB territory, reaching the Blazers 45-yard-line, before two sacks in the next three plays set them at 4th & 16 from their own 49-yard-line. The punt resulted in a touchback, giving UAB the ball at their own 20-yard-line, though a false start immediately set them back to the 15-yard-line. They were pushed back further when quarterback Jacob Zeno was sacked by Nolan Johnson for a loss of six yards, though UAB converted 3rd & 19 a few plays later with a 48-yard pass from Zeno to Shropshire. A pair of incomplete passes made it 3rd & 10, and a sack then forced a punt by Kyle Greenwell, which was returned to the Miami 35-yard-line. Miami's ensuing drive proved to be their most successful to that point; after earning a first down on the drive's second play, they faced a 4th & 1 but converted it with a 2-yard rush from Smith. After reaching the UAB 35-yard-line, they faced another 4th & 1 four plays later and converted this one with another Smith 2-yard rush. On the following play, Smith passed to Mac Hippenhammer for a 33-yard touchdown, though Graham Nicholson's extra point attempt was blocked. Inheriting possession with 34 seconds left in the first half, UAB moved the ball 21 yards before attempting a Hail Mary pass with three seconds left. The pass was intercepted by Rowan Zolman, ending the half.

=== Second half ===
UAB started the third quarter with possession of the ball on their own 25-yard-line. A 15-yard pass from Hopkins to Dexter Boykin on their second play gave them a first down, and a 14-yard Hopkins-to-Shropshire three plays later converted a 3rd & 12 and put the ball in Miami territory. An unsportsmanlike conduct foul on Shropshire moved the ball back to the UAB 38-yard-line on the next play, though an offside penalty on Miami and a 6-yard rush by Jermaine Brown Jr. gave the Blazers a first down at the UAB 49-yard-line. They crossed midfield on the next play, but stalled from there on as an incomplete pass on 4th & 7 resulted in a turnover on downs. Inheriting possession on their own 38-yard-line, Miami's offense was unable to find success after a sack on second down and punted on 4th & 6; however, the punt was muffed by UAB's Starling Thomas V and recovered by Miami's Ambe' Caldwell on the UAB 4-yard-line. Kevin Davis scored on the next play, giving Miami their first lead of the game. The ensuing kickoff resulted in a touchback, and UAB took over on the 25-yard-line. Two rushes by Brown earned the Blazers a first down, and they gained another three plays later with a pass from Hopkins to Fred Farrier II. Two more first downs followed as UAB drove down the field, and they reached the Miami 16-yard-line before a loss of two yards on a Brown rush ended the third quarter.

The fourth quarter started with a 12-yard pass from Hopkins to Farrier, putting UAB inside the Miami 10-yard-line. Two 3-yard rushes by Brown got the Blazers into the end zone with thirteen and a half minutes to play, and Matt Quinn's extra point bumped their lead to four points. Miami moved the ball into UAB territory in three plays on their ensuing drive, with a pair of passes by Smith and a rush by Tyre Shelton. A Keyon Mozee rush gained the RedHawks an additional ten yards, and Smith rushed for two yards on 3rd & 1 a few plays later to earn another first down for Miami. A Shelton rush for nine yards got Miami into the red zone, and Smith passed to Kenny Tracy for a 10-yard touchdown three plays later to give the RedHawks the lead by three points. UAB's next drive was cut short; after a 2-yard rush on first down, Brown fumbled on second down and the ball was recovered by Miami's Matthew Salopek at the UAB 28-yard-line with 5:45 remaining in the game. The RedHawks started on the ground with a Kevin Davis rush, though it was stopped for a loss of two yards, and they were unable to gain yards on their next two plays. This set up a 47-yard field goal attempt by Nicholson, which was missed wide right, giving the ball back to UAB at their own 30-yard-line with four minutes remaining. UAB took immediate advantage of this miscue as Hopkins passed to Shropshire for a 49-yard gain on the next play, advancing the ball to the Miami 21-yard-line. Three Jermaine Brown Jr. rushes in a row gained a total of nine yards, and Brown rushed up the middle for a 12-yard touchdown on 4th & 1. Along with Quinn's extra point that followed, this put UAB in the lead by four points with 91 seconds on the clock. Miami quickly faced a fourth down in their ensuing drive, having gained only five yards in their first three plays, but a 7-yard Smith rush gave Miami a first down at their own 37-yard-line. After a gain of six on their next play, Miami's offense again stalled and faced 4th & 4 several plays later. They converted this as well, with a 12-yard pass, and made it to the UAB 30-yard-line with one second remaining, giving them the opportunity to run one final play. A facemask penalty moved the ball spot up to the UAB 15-yard-line, but a pass from Smith to Jalen Walker came up two yards short of the end zone as time ran out. The game ended at 2:54 p.m., after a total duration of three hours and 18 minutes, with UAB having won 24–20.

=== Scoring summary ===
2022 HomeTown Lenders Bahamas Bowl

Quarter	1	2	3	4	Total
Miami	0	6	7	7	20
UAB	10	0	0	14	24

at Thomas Robinson Stadium • Nassau, Bahamas

- Date: December 16, 2022
- Game time: 11:35 a.m. EST
- Game weather: Sunny • Temperature: 81 °F (27 °C) • Wind: 12 mph (19 km/h) north
- Game attendance: 12,172
- Referee: Tim Davis
- TV announcers (ESPN): Steve Levy (play-by-play), Joey Galloway (analyst), and Kris Budden (sideline)
- Box score

Scoring summary

Quarter	Time	Drive			Team	Scoring information	Score	
Quarter	Time	Plays	Yards	TOP	Team	Scoring information	Miami	UAB
1	9:22	5	68	2:16	UAB	Trea Shropshire 10-yard touchdown reception from Dylan Hopkins, Matt Quinn kick good	0	7
1	3:31	10	45	4:52	UAB	42-yard field goal by Matt Quinn	0	10
2	0:34	11	65	3:30	Miami	Mac Hippenhammer 33-yard touchdown reception from Aveon Smith, Graham Nicholson kick failed (blocked)	6	10
3	5:44	1	4	0:06	Miami	Kevin Davis 4-yard touchdown run, Graham Nicholson kick good	13	10
4	13:29	14	75	7:15	UAB	Jermaine Brown Jr. 3-yard touchdown run, Matt Quinn kick good	13	17
4	6:52	12	75	6:37	Miami	Kenny Tracy 10-yard touchdown reception from Aveon Smith, Graham Nicholson kick good	20	17
4	1:33	5	70	2:43	UAB	Jermaine Brown Jr. 12-yard touchdown run, Matt Quinn kick good	20	24
"TOP" = time of possession. For other American football terms, see Glossary of American football.							20	24

== Statistics ==
Team statistical comparison
Statistic	Miami	UAB
First downs	20	24
First downs rushing	9	11
First downs passing	9	10
First downs penalty	2	3
Third down efficiency	4–14	7–12
Fourth down efficiency	4–5	1–3
Total plays–net yards	64–272	66–390
Rushing attempts–net yards	37–110	38–138
Yards per rush	3.0	3.6
Yards passing	162	252
Pass completions–attempts	15–27	17–28
Interceptions thrown	0	1
Punt returns–total yards	1–25	2–(−8)
Kickoff returns–total yards	0–0	1–0
Punts–average yardage	4–45.3	1–37.0
Fumbles–lost	0–0	3–2
Penalties–yards	5–50	7–75
Time of possession	26:40	33:20

Miami statistics
RedHawks passing
	C–A	Yds	TD–INT
Aveon Smith	15–27	162	2–0
RedHawks rushing
	Car	Yds	TD
Aveon Smith	22	50	0
Tyre Shelton	8	31	0
Keyon Mozee	3	16	0
Kevin Davis	3	9	1
Kenny Tracy	1	4	0
RedHawks receiving
	Rec	Yds	TD
Kevin Davis	3	39	0
Jalen Walker	4	30	0
Kenny Tracy	3	22	1
Mac Hippenhammer	2	43	1
Jack Coldiron	1	15	0
Miles Marshall	1	13	0

UAB statistics
Blazers passing
	C–A	Yds	TD–INT
Dylan Hopkins	16–24	204	1–1
Jacob Zeno	1–4	48	0–0
Blazers rushing
	Car	Yds	TD
Jermaine Brown Jr.	24	116	2
Lee Witherspoon	5	27	0
Dylan Hopkins	4	7	0
A.J. Gates	2	−1	0
Jacob Zeno	3	−11	0
Blazers receiving
	Rec	Yds	TD
Trea Shropshire	6	183	1
Fred Farrier II	2	20	0
Dexter Boykin	2	19	0
Tejhaun Palmer	3	18	0
Jermaine Brown Jr.	2	6	0
Terrell McDonald	1	3	0
Dallas Payne	1	3	0
