= 2010 Conference USA Football Championship Game =

- Conference Championship
SMU Mustangs	UCF Knights
(7–5)	(9–3)
7	17
Head coach: June Jones	Head coach: George O'Leary
	1	2	3	4	Total
SMU	0	0	0	7	7
UCF	7	3	7	0	17
- Date: December 4, 2010
- Season: 2010
- Stadium: Bright House Networks Stadium
- Location: Orlando, Florida
- MVP: Latavius Murray, RB, UCF
- Favorite: UCF by 8
- Referee: Randy Smith
- Attendance: 41,045

United States TV coverage
- Network: ESPN2
- Announcers: Bob Wischusen & Brian Griese

2010 Conference USA football standings
	Conf.			Overall
Team	W		L	W		L
East Division
No. 21 UCF x$	7	–	1	11	–	3
East Carolina	5	–	3	6	–	7
Southern Miss	5	–	3	8	–	5
Marshall	4	–	4	5	–	7
UAB	3	–	5	4	–	8
Memphis	0	–	8	1	–	11
West Division
SMU xy	6	–	2	7	–	7
No. 24 Tulsa x	6	–	2	10	–	3
Houston	4	–	4	5	–	7
UTEP	3	–	5	6	–	7
Rice	3	–	5	4	–	8
Tulane	2	–	6	4	–	8
Championship: UCF 17, SMU 7
$ – Conference champion; x – Division champion/co-champions; y – Championship game participant; As of January 11, 2011; Rankings from AP Poll

The 2010 Conference USA Football Championship Game was played on December 4, 2010, at Bright House Networks Stadium, now known as Acrisure Bounce House, in Orlando, Florida. The game was played between the UCF Knights, winner of Conference USA's East Division, and the SMU Mustangs, the winner the West Division.

UCF was seeking their second C-USA title, and hosting the game for the third time. SMU was experiencing their second consecutive winning season, and their third one since returning from the "death penalty" in 1989. It would be SMU's first attempt to win a conference title since 1984, when they won a share of the Southwest Conference championship.

== 2009 season ==
The 2009 Conference USA Football Championship Game on December 5, 2009, consisted of the East Carolina Pirates, the champion of Conference USA's East Division, beating the West Division champion Houston Cougars at Dowdy–Ficklen Stadium in Greenville, North Carolina by a score of 38 to 32.

== Match-up History ==
This was the third time the UCF Knights and the SMU Mustangs met on the football field. The previous to match-up proved UCF victorious at home by a score of 31–17 in the regular season. SMU up on till this point has not bested UCF in a football game.

== Game summary ==
Under conference rules, the game was held at the home field of the team with the best record in conference play; since UCF finished C-USA play at 7–1, better than SMU's 6–2, the game was held at the Knights' home field.

=== Scoring summary ===
Quarter	Time	Drive		Team	Scoring Information	Score	
Quarter	Time	Length	Time	Team	Scoring Information	SMU	UCF
1	07:32	13 plays, 73 yards	7:28	UCF	Latavius Murray 5-yard reception from Jeffrey Godfrey, Nick Cattoi kick good	0	7
2	00:00	13 plays, 68 yards	1:58	UCF	Nick Cattoi 29-yard field goal	0	10
3	06:25	8 plays, 85 yards	4:53	UCF	Latavius Murray 36-yard run, Nick Cattoi kick good	0	17
4	09:15	10 plays, 88 yards	4:25	SMU	Aldrick Robinson 22-yard reception from Kyle Padron, Matt Szymanski kick good	7	17
Final Score						7	17

=== Statistics ===
Statistics	SMU	UCF
First downs	19	21
Total yards	317	311
Rushes–yards–TD	30-97-0	44-144-1
Passing yards	220	167
Passing: Comp–Att–TD-Int	18-35-1-2	15-19-1-0
Turnovers	2	0
Penalties–Yards	3-30	4-45

Team	Category	Player	Statistics
SMU	Passing	Kyle Padron	18-34, 220 yards, 1 TD, 2 INT
SMU	Rushing	Zach Line	18 carries, 105 yards, 0 TDs
SMU	Receiving	Darius Johnson	9 receptions, 105 yards, 0 TDs
UCF	Passing	Jeff Godfrey	15–19, 167 yards, 1 TD, 0 INT
UCF	Rushing	Latavius Murray	20 carries, 94 yards, 1 TD
UCF	Receiving	Kamar Aiken	4 receptions, 52 yards, 0 TDs
