= 2010 Marshall Thundering Herd football team =

American college football season

2010 Marshall Thundering Herd football
- Conference: Conference USA
- East
- Record: 5–7 (4–4 C-USA)
- Head coach: Doc Holliday (1st season)
- Offensive coordinator: Bill Legg (1st season)
- Co-offensive coordinator: Tony Petersen (1st season)
- Offensive scheme: Spread
- Defensive coordinator: Chris Rippon (1st season)
- Base defense: 3–4
- Home stadium: Joan C. Edwards Stadium (Capacity: 38,019)

2010 Conference USA football standings
| | Conf. | | | Overall |
| Team | W | | L | W | | L |
|---|---|---|---|---|---|---|
East Division
| No. 21 UCF x$ | 7 | – | 1 | 11 | – | 3 |
| East Carolina | 5 | – | 3 | 6 | – | 7 |
| Southern Miss | 5 | – | 3 | 8 | – | 5 |
| Marshall | 4 | – | 4 | 5 | – | 7 |
| UAB | 3 | – | 5 | 4 | – | 8 |
| Memphis | 0 | – | 8 | 1 | – | 11 |
West Division
| SMU xy | 6 | – | 2 | 7 | – | 7 |
| No. 24 Tulsa x | 6 | – | 2 | 10 | – | 3 |
| Houston | 4 | – | 4 | 5 | – | 7 |
| UTEP | 3 | – | 5 | 6 | – | 7 |
| Rice | 3 | – | 5 | 4 | – | 8 |
| Tulane | 2 | – | 6 | 4 | – | 8 |
Championship: UCF 17, SMU 7
$ – Conference champion; x – Division champion/co-champions; y – Championship game participant; As of January 11, 2011; Rankings from AP Poll

The 2010 Marshall Thundering Herd football team represented Marshall University in the 2010 NCAA Division I FBS football season. The team competed in the East Division of Conference USA. The season was the first for head coach Doc Holliday. Marshall finished the season 5–7, 4–4 in C-USA play.

== Previous season ==
In the 2009 season under former head coach Mark Snyder, the Thundering Herd finished with an overall record of 7–6 and 4–4 within Conference USA. They played in the 2009 Little Caesars Pizza Bowl, defeating the Ohio University Bobcats 21–17. It was Marshall first bowl game since the 2004 Fort Worth Bowl, and the Herd's first bowl win since the 2002 GMAC Bowl. Snyder is currently the defensive coordinator of the University of South Florida Bulls.

== Schedule ==
| Date | Time | Opponent | Site | TV | Result | Attendance |
|---|---|---|---|---|---|---|
| September 2 | 7:30 pm | at No. 2 Ohio State* | Ohio Stadium; Columbus, OH | BTN | L 7–45 | 105,040 |
| September 10 | 7:00 pm | No. 23 West Virginia* | Joan C. Edwards Stadium; Huntington, WV (Friends of Coal Bowl) | ESPN | L 21–24 ^{OT} | 41,382 |
| September 18 | 7:00 pm | at Bowling Green* | Doyt Perry Stadium; Bowling Green, OH | WSAZ | L 28–44 | 20,515 |
| September 25 | 7:00 pm | Ohio* | Joan C. Edwards Stadium; Huntington, WV (Battle for the Bell) | WSAZ | W 24–23 | 28,143 |
| October 2 | 8:00 pm | at Southern Miss | M. M. Roberts Stadium; Hattiesburg, MS | CBSCS | L 16–41 | 27,518 |
| October 13 | 8:00 pm | UCF | Joan C. Edwards Stadium; Huntington, WV | ESPN | L 14–35 | 23,601 |
| October 23 | 4:15 pm | at East Carolina | Dowdy–Ficklen Stadium; Greenville, NC (rivalry) | CSS | L 10–37 | 50,145 |
| October 30 | 3:00 pm | UTEP^{†} | Joan C. Edwards Stadium; Huntington, WV | | W 16–12 | 24,740 |
| November 6 | 4:15 pm | at UAB | Legion Field; Birmingham, AL | CSS | W 31–17 | 17,860 |
| November 13 | 3:00 pm | Memphis | Joan C. Edwards Stadium; Huntington, WV | | W 28–13 | 25,108 |
| November 20 | 3:00 pm | at SMU | Gerald J. Ford Stadium; Dallas, TX | | L 17–31 | 17,513 |
| November 27 | 12:00 pm | Tulane | Joan C. Edwards Stadium; Huntington, WV | CBSCS | W 38–23 | 19,302 |
*Non-conference game; ^{†}Homecoming; Rankings from AP Poll released prior to the game; All times are in Eastern time

== Game summaries ==
=== Ohio State ===
| | 1 | 2 | 3 | 4 | Total |
|---|---|---|---|---|---|
| Thundering Herd | 7 | 0 | 0 | 0 | 7 |
| #2 Buckeyes | 21 | 14 | 7 | 3 | 45 |

=== West Virginia ===
| | 1 | 2 | 3 | 4 | OT | Total |
|---|---|---|---|---|---|---|
| #23 Mountaineers | 3 | 0 | 3 | 15 | 3 | 24 |
| Thundering Herd | 7 | 7 | 0 | 7 | 0 | 21 |

=== Bowling Green ===
| | 1 | 2 | 3 | 4 | Total |
|---|---|---|---|---|---|
| Thundering Herd | 0 | 14 | 14 | 0 | 28 |
| Falcons | 14 | 14 | 0 | 16 | 44 |

=== Ohio ===
| | 1 | 2 | 3 | 4 | Total |
|---|---|---|---|---|---|
| Bobcats | 0 | 3 | 14 | 6 | 23 |
| Thundering Herd | 7 | 6 | 3 | 8 | 24 |

=== Southern Miss ===
| | 1 | 2 | 3 | 4 | Total |
|---|---|---|---|---|---|
| Thundering Herd | 0 | 0 | 7 | 9 | 16 |
| Golden Eagles | 14 | 14 | 6 | 7 | 41 |

=== Central Florida ===
| | 1 | 2 | 3 | 4 | Total |
|---|---|---|---|---|---|
| Knights | 7 | 7 | 14 | 7 | 35 |
| Thundering Herd | 0 | 7 | 7 | 0 | 14 |

=== East Carolina ===
| | 1 | 2 | 3 | 4 | Total |
|---|---|---|---|---|---|
| Thundering Herd | 3 | 7 | 0 | 0 | 10 |
| Pirates | 7 | 13 | 10 | 7 | 37 |

=== UTEP ===
| | 1 | 2 | 3 | 4 | Total |
|---|---|---|---|---|---|
| Miners | 0 | 3 | 3 | 6 | 12 |
| Thundering Herd | 7 | 0 | 0 | 9 | 16 |

=== UAB ===
| | 1 | 2 | 3 | 4 | Total |
|---|---|---|---|---|---|
| Thundering Herd | 14 | 3 | 0 | 14 | 31 |
| Blazers | 7 | 7 | 0 | 3 | 17 |

=== Memphis ===
| | 1 | 2 | 3 | 4 | Total |
|---|---|---|---|---|---|
| Tigers | 7 | 3 | 0 | 3 | 13 |
| Thundering Herd | 0 | 0 | 14 | 14 | 28 |

=== SMU ===
| | 1 | 2 | 3 | 4 | Total |
|---|---|---|---|---|---|
| Thundering Herd | 0 | 0 | 10 | 7 | 17 |
| Mustangs | 7 | 17 | 7 | 0 | 31 |

=== Tulane ===
| | 1 | 2 | 3 | 4 | Total |
|---|---|---|---|---|---|
| Green Wave | 7 | 7 | 7 | 2 | 23 |
| Thundering Herd | 7 | 24 | 7 | 0 | 38 |

== Team players drafted in the NFL ==
The following players were selected in the 2011 NFL draft.

| Player | Position | Round | Pick | Franchise |
| Lee Smith | Tight End | 5 | 159 | New England Patriots |
