= 2010 Southern Miss Golden Eagles football team =

American college football season

2010 Southern Miss Golden Eagles football

Beef 'O' Brady's Bowl, L 28–31 vs Louisville
- Conference: Conference USA
- East Division
- Record: 8–5 (5–3 C-USA)
- Head coach: Larry Fedora (3rd season)
- Offensive coordinator: Blake Anderson (1st season)
- Offensive scheme: Spread
- Defensive coordinator: Todd Bradford (3rd season)
- Base defense: 4–3
- Home stadium: M. M. Roberts Stadium

2010 Conference USA football standings
	Conf.			Overall
Team	W		L	W		L
East Division
No. 21 UCF x$	7	–	1	11	–	3
East Carolina	5	–	3	6	–	7
Southern Miss	5	–	3	8	–	5
Marshall	4	–	4	5	–	7
UAB	3	–	5	4	–	8
Memphis	0	–	8	1	–	11
West Division
SMU xy	6	–	2	7	–	7
No. 24 Tulsa x	6	–	2	10	–	3
Houston	4	–	4	5	–	7
UTEP	3	–	5	6	–	7
Rice	3	–	5	4	–	8
Tulane	2	–	6	4	–	8
Championship: UCF 17, SMU 7
$ – Conference champion; x – Division champion/co-champions; y – Championship game participant; As of January 11, 2011; Rankings from AP Poll

The 2010 Southern Miss Golden Eagles football team represented University of Southern Mississippi in the 2010 NCAA Division I FBS football season. The team's head coach was Larry Fedora, who was in his third year at Southern Miss. They played their home games at M. M. Roberts Stadium in Hattiesburg, Mississippi and competed in the East Division of Conference USA. They finished the season 8–5, 5–3 in C-USA play and were invited to the Beef 'O' Brady's Bowl, where they were defeated by Louisville, 31–28.

== Schedule ==
Date	Time	Opponent	Site	TV	Result	Attendance
September 2	6:30 pm	at South Carolina*	Williams-Brice Stadium; Columbia, SC	ESPN	L 13–41	70,438
September 11	6:00 pm	Prairie View A&M*	M. M. Roberts Stadium; Hattiesburg, MS		W 34–7	27,316
September 17	7:00 pm	Kansas*	M. M. Roberts Stadium; Hattiesburg, MS	ESPN	W 31–16	30,211
September 25	6:00 pm	at Louisiana Tech*	Joe Aillet Stadium; Ruston, LA (Rivalry in Dixie)	ESPN3	W 13–12	22,344
October 2	7:00 pm	Marshall	M. M. Roberts Stadium; Hattiesburg, MS	CBSCS	W 41–16	27,518
October 9	6:30 pm	East Carolina^{†}	M. M. Roberts Stadium; Hattiesburg, MS	CSS	L 43–44	32,334
October 16	11:00 am	at Memphis	Liberty Bowl Memorial Stadium; Memphis, TN (Black and Blue Bowl)	CSS	W 41–19	18,848
October 30	11:00 am	UAB	M. M. Roberts Stadium; Hattiesburg, MS	CSS	L 49–50 ^{2OT}	26,415
November 6	2:30 pm	at Tulane	Louisiana Superdome; New Orleans, LA (Battle for the Bell)	CST	W 46–30	22,737
November 13	11:00 am	at No. 25 UCF	Bright House Networks Stadium; Orlando, FL	CBSCS	W 31–21	40,358
November 20	6:00 pm	Houston	M. M. Roberts Stadium; Hattiesburg, MS	CBSCS	W 59–41	32,606
November 26	5:30 pm	at Tulsa	Chapman Stadium; Tulsa, OK	CBSCS	L 50–56	21,901
December 21	7:00 pm	vs. Louisville*	Tropicana Field; St. Petersburg, FL (Beef 'O' Brady's Bowl)	ESPN	L 28–31	20,017
*Non-conference game; ^{†}Homecoming; Rankings from AP Poll released prior to the game; All times are in Central time

== Roster ==
2010 Southern Miss Golden Eagles football team roster
Players			Coaches
Offense: Pos. / # / Name / Class; QB / 12 / Austin Davis / Jr	Defense: Pos. / # / Name / Class; DL / 8 / Jamie Collins / So	Special teams: Pos. / # / Name / Class	Head coach: Larry Fedora; Coordinators/assistant coaches: Grady Brown (cornerbacks); Legend: (C) Team captain; (S) Suspended; (I) Ineligible; Injured; Redshirt; Roster
