= 2010 Rice Owls football team =

American college football season

2010 Rice Owls football
- Conference: Conference USA
- West
- Record: 4–8 (3–5 CUSA)
- Head coach: David Bailiff (4th season)
- Offensive coordinator: David Beaty (1st season)
- Offensive scheme: Spread
- Defensive coordinator: Chuck Driesbach (4th season)
- Base defense: 4–3
- Home stadium: Rice Stadium

2010 Conference USA football standings
	Conf.			Overall
Team	W		L	W		L
East Division
No. 21 UCF x$	7	–	1	11	–	3
East Carolina	5	–	3	6	–	7
Southern Miss	5	–	3	8	–	5
Marshall	4	–	4	5	–	7
UAB	3	–	5	4	–	8
Memphis	0	–	8	1	–	11
West Division
SMU xy	6	–	2	7	–	7
No. 24 Tulsa x	6	–	2	10	–	3
Houston	4	–	4	5	–	7
UTEP	3	–	5	6	–	7
Rice	3	–	5	4	–	8
Tulane	2	–	6	4	–	8
Championship: UCF 17, SMU 7
$ – Conference champion; x – Division champion/co-champions; y – Championship game participant; As of January 11, 2011; Rankings from AP Poll

The 2010 Rice Owls football team represented Rice University in the 2010 college football season. The Owls, led by fourth-year head coach David Bailiff, are members of Conference USA in the West Division and played their home games at Rice Stadium. They finished the season 4–8, 3–5 in C-USA play.

== Schedule ==
Date	Time	Opponent	Site	TV	Result	Attendance
September 4	2:30 pm	vs. No. 5 Texas*	Reliant Stadium; Houston, Texas	ESPN	L 17–34	70,445
September 11	6:00 pm	at North Texas*	Fouts Field; Denton, TX		W 32–31	23,743
September 18	6:00 pm	Northwestern*	Rice Stadium; Houston, TX		L 13–30	15,562
September 25	7:00 pm	Baylor*	Rice Stadium; Houston, TX	CBSCS	L 13–30	23,395
October 2	6:00 pm	SMU	Rice Stadium; Houston, TX (Battle for the Mayor's Cup)		L 31–42	14,981
October 9	8:05 pm	at UTEP	Sun Bowl; El Paso, TX		L 24–44	28,955
October 16	2:30 pm	Houston^{†}	Rice Stadium; Houston, TX (rivalry)	CSS	W 34–31	26,342
October 23	2:30 pm	at UCF	Bright House Networks Stadium; Orlando, FL	BHSN	L 14–41	38,151
November 6	1:00 pm	at Tulsa	Chapman Stadium; Tulsa, OK		L 27–64	19,036
November 13	2:30 pm	at Tulane	Louisiana Superdome; New Orleans, LA		L 49–54	16,698
November 20	12:00 pm	East Carolina	Rice Stadium; Houston, TX		W 62–38	15,262
November 27	2:30 pm	UAB	Rice Stadium; Houston, TX	CSS	W 28–23	13,007
*Non-conference game; ^{†}Homecoming; Rankings from AP Poll released prior to the game; All times are in Central time

== NFL draft ==
7th Round, 254th Overall Pick (last pick also known as Mr. Irrelevant) DE Cheta Ozougwu by the Houston Texans.
