= 2010 UTEP Miners football team =

American college football season

2010 UTEP Miners football

New Mexico Bowl, L 24–52 vs. BYU
- Conference: Conference USA
- West Division
- Record: 6–7 (3–5 C-USA)
- Head coach: Mike Price (7th season)
- Offensive coordinator: Bob Connelly (3rd season)
- Offensive scheme: Spread
- Defensive coordinator: Andre Patterson (1st season)
- Base defense: 3–4
- Home stadium: Sun Bowl

2010 Conference USA football standings
	Conf.			Overall
Team	W		L	W		L
East Division
No. 21 UCF x$	7	–	1	11	–	3
East Carolina	5	–	3	6	–	7
Southern Miss	5	–	3	8	–	5
Marshall	4	–	4	5	–	7
UAB	3	–	5	4	–	8
Memphis	0	–	8	1	–	11
West Division
SMU xy	6	–	2	7	–	7
No. 24 Tulsa x	6	–	2	10	–	3
Houston	4	–	4	5	–	7
UTEP	3	–	5	6	–	7
Rice	3	–	5	4	–	8
Tulane	2	–	6	4	–	8
Championship: UCF 17, SMU 7
$ – Conference champion; x – Division champion/co-champions; y – Championship game participant; As of January 11, 2011; Rankings from AP Poll

The 2010 UTEP Miners football team represented the University of Texas at El Paso (UTEP) as a member of the West Division in Conference USA (C-USA) during the 2010 NCAA Division I FCS football season. Led by seventh-year head coach Mike Price, the Miners compiled an overall record of 6–7 with a mark of 3–5 in conference play, tying for fourth place in the C-USA's West Division. UTEP was invited to the New Mexico Bowl, where the Miners lost to BYU. The team played home games at the Sun Bowl in El Paso, Texas.

UTEP averaged 29,350 fans per game.

== Schedule ==
Date	Time	Opponent	Site	TV	Result	Attendance	Source
September 4	7:05 pm	Arkansas Pine Bluff*	Sun Bowl; El Paso, TX		W 31–10	30,029	
September 10	8:15 pm	at Houston	Robertson Stadium; Houston, TX	ESPN	L 24–54	32,119	
September 18	7:05 pm	New Mexico State*	Sun Bowl; El Paso, TX (Battle of I-10)		W 42–10	39,214	
September 25	7:05 pm	Memphis	Sun Bowl; El Paso, TX		W 16–13	29,765	
October 2	4:00 pm	at New Mexico*	University Stadium; Albuquerque, NM		W 38–20	22,511	
October 9	7:05 pm	Rice^{†}	Sun Bowl; El Paso, TX		W 44–24	28,955	
October 16	2:00 pm	at UAB	Legion Field; Birmingham, AL		L 6–21	11,756	
October 23	7:05 pm	Tulane	Sun Bowl; El Paso, TX		L 24–34	25,007	
October 30	1:00 pm	at Marshall	Joan C. Edwards Stadium; Huntington, WV		L 12–16	24,740	
November 6	7:05 pm	SMU	Sun Bowl; El Paso, TX		W 28–14	23,127	
November 13	6:00 pm	at No. 14 Arkansas*	Donald W. Reynolds Razorback Stadium; Fayetteville, AR	ESPNU	L 21–58	67,330	
November 20	12:00 pm	at Tulsa	Skelly Field at H. A. Chapman Stadium; Tulsa, OK		L 28–31	16,547	
December 18	12:00 pm	vs. BYU*	University Stadium; Albuquerque, NM (New Mexico Bowl)	ESPN	L 24–52	32,424	
*Non-conference game; ^{†}Homecoming; Rankings from AP Poll released prior to the game; All times are in Mountain time
