= Jegil Dugger =

American football player (born 1979)

No. 24
- Position: Running back

Personal information
- Born: November 1, 1979 (age 47)
- Listed height: 5 ft 11 in (1.80 m)
- Listed weight: 212 lb (96 kg)

Career information
- High school: Midfield
- College: UAB

Career history
- 2003: Edmonton Eskimos
- 2004: Wyoming Cavalry

Jegil Dugger (born November 1, 1979) is an American former football running back and current businessman. He played college football for the UAB Blazers, and professionally for the Edmonton Eskimos and Wyoming Cavalry.

== College career ==
Dugger graduated from Midfield High School in 1997, rated as a top 50 running back on Tom Lemming's Prep Football Report. Dugger was running back for the Blazers from 1998 to 2001, running nearly 2,000 yards over his career, and eventually became team captain. He finished college as an NFL prospect. He ranks 6th on UAB's all-time career yardage and career touchdowns, and 9th for single-season yardage.

== Professional career ==
After college he played in the Canadian Football League, signing with the Edmonton Eskimos on May 18, 2003. His professional career in the CFL lasted just over one year. He was supposed to sign with the Calgary Stampeders for the 2004 season but sat out due to a contract dispute; instead, he played for the Wyoming Cavalry as a free agent.

Dugger now works on software and technology at Juke Slot, a self-ordering kiosk manufacturer. In 2017 he pledged $100,000 to UAB Football, whose program was set to return in September after having been sidelined in 2014 due to lack of funding.

== Statistics ==
Year	Team	G	GS	Receiving					Rushing					Fumbles	
Year	Team	G	GS	Rec	Yds	Avg	Lng	TD	Att	Yds	Avg	Lng	TD	FUM	Lost
Regular season
1998	UAB			1	18	18.0		0	14	62	4.4		1	0	0
1999	UAB			5	10	2.0		0	44	226	5.1		1	0	0
2000	UAB			8	34	4.3	16	0	177	852	4.8	37	5	0	0
2001	UAB			10	62	6.2	14	0	218	839	3.8	36	6	0	0
Total				24	124	5.2	30	0	453	1,979	4.4	73	13	0	0

== See also ==
- UAB Blazers football statistical leaders
