= DeWayne McBride =

American football player (born 2001)

Orlando Pirates
- Position: Running back

Personal information
- Born: July 8, 2001 (age 25); Starke, Florida, U.S.
- Listed height: 5 ft 11 in (1.80 m)
- Listed weight: 215 lb (98 kg)

Career information
- High school: Vanguard (Ocala, Florida)
- College: UAB (2020–2022)
- NFL draft: 2023: 7th round, 222nd overall pick

Career history
- Minnesota Vikings (2023–2024)*; Memphis Showboats (2025)*; Edmonton Elks (2025)*; Orlando Pirates (2026–present)
- * Offseason or practice squad member only

Awards and highlights
- C-USA Offensive Player of the Year (2022); First-team All-C-USA (2022); Second-team All-C-USA (2021)
- Stats at Pro Football Reference

DeWayne McBride (born July 8, 2001) is an American professional football running back for the Orlando Pirates of the Indoor Football League (IFL). He played college football for the UAB Blazers, earning Conference USA Offensive Player of the Year honors in 2022 after rushing for over 1,700 yards with 19 touchdowns.

== Early life ==
McBride attended Vanguard High School in Ocala, Florida. As a senior, McBride recorded 936 yards and 12 touchdowns. A three-star recruit, McBride committed to play college football at the University of Alabama at Birmingham.

== College career ==
As a freshman with the Blazers in 2020, McBride played in six games, tallying 439 yards on 47 carries while scoring four touchdowns. Against Louisiana Tech, McBride ran for a 75-yard touchdown, breaking the record for the longest touchdown rush in school history. McBride entered the 2021 season on the Conference USA (C-USA) preseason all-conference team and on the Doak Walker Award preseason watch list. In 2021, McBride rushed 205 times for 1,371 yards and 13 touchdowns while averaging 6.72 yards per carry and recording over 100 yards rushing six times. McBride rushed for a then career high 210 yards and four touchdowns in a win against Louisiana Tech. At the end of the season, McBride was named to the Second team All-C-USA. Entering the 2022 season, McBride was once again named to the Doak Walker Award preseason watch list while also being named to the Maxwell Award preseason watch list. In 2022, McBride led the NCAA in total rushing yards with 1,713, and led the nation in yards per game (155.7). He also broke the school's record for rushing yards in a game, totaling a career high 272 yards, and rushing touchdowns in a single season with 19. As a result, McBride was named the C-USA's Offensive Player of the Year. McBride would forgo playing in the 2022 Bahamas Bowl and declared for the 2023 NFL draft. He played 31 games during his college career, recording 484 rushing attempts for 3,523 yards and 36 touchdowns.

=== College statistics ===
Year	Team	GP	Rushing				Receiving			
Year	Team	GP	Att	Yds	Avg	TD	Rec	Yds	Avg	TD
2020	UAB	6	47	439	9.3	4	0	0	0	0
2021	UAB	13	204	1,371	6.7	13	3	19	0	0
2022	UAB	12	233	1,713	7.4	19	2	10	0	0
Career		31	484	3,523	7.3	36	5	29	0	0

== Professional career ==
Pre-draft measurables
Height	Weight	Arm length	Hand span	Bench press
5 ft 10 3/8 in (1.79 m)	209 lb (95 kg)	30 5/8 in (0.78 m)	9 1/2 in (0.24 m)	20 reps

=== Minnesota Vikings ===
McBride was drafted by the Minnesota Vikings in the seventh round with the 222nd overall pick in the 2023 NFL draft. He was waived on August 29, 2023, and signed to the practice squad the next day. Following the end of the 2023 regular season, the Vikings signed him to a reserve/future contract on January 8, 2024.

McBride was waived by the Vikings on August 26, 2024, and re-signed to the practice squad, but released the next day.

=== Memphis Showboats ===
On January 6, 2025, McBride signed with the Memphis Showboats of the United Football League (UFL). He was released on March 20, 2025.

=== Edmonton Elks ===
On May 5, 2025, McBride signed with the Edmonton Elks of the Canadian Football League. He was released on June 1, 2025.

=== Orlando Pirates ===
On February 27, 2026, it was announced that McBride signed with the Orlando Pirates of the Indoor Football League.
