= 2004 Hawaii Bowl =

2004 Sheraton Hawaii Bowl
Hawaii Warriors	UAB Blazers
(7–5)	(7–4)
WAC	C-USA
59	40
Head coach: June Jones	Head coach: Watson Brown
	1	2	3	4	Total
Hawaii	21	7	17	14	59
UAB	13	13	7	7	40
- Date: December 24, 2004
- Season: 2004
- Stadium: Aloha Stadium
- Location: Honolulu, Hawaii
- MVP: WR Chad Owens (Hawai'i); QB Timmy Chang (Hawai'i); QB Darrell Hackney (UAB)
- Referee: Jack Folliard (Pac-10)
- Attendance: 39,754
- Payout: US$750,000 per team

United States TV coverage
- Network: ESPN
- Announcers: Dave Pasch (Play-by-Play); Rod Gilmore (Analyst); Trevor Matich (Analyst); Rob Stone (Sidelines)

The 2004 Sheraton Hawaii Bowl, part of the 2004 bowl game season, took place on Christmas Eve 2004, at Aloha Stadium in Honolulu, Hawaii. The competing teams were the UAB Blazers, representing Conference USA (C-USA) and the Hawaii Warriors, representing the Western Athletic Conference (WAC). Hawaii won the game, 59–40. This was the third Hawaii Bowl, and was sponsored by Sheraton Hotels and Resorts.

== Teams ==
=== Hawaii ===
Hawaii finished the 2004 season with an 8–5 record, going 4–4 in WAC play. The Warriors made their third straight appearance in the Hawaiʻi Bowl, facing off against UAB. The Warriors would go on to defeat the Blazers and cap off their third straight winning season, the fifth in six seasons under head coach June Jones.

=== UAB ===
The Blazers finished the 2004 season with a record of 7–5 (5–3 C-USA). The Blazers would also make their first and so far only appearance.

== Game summary ==
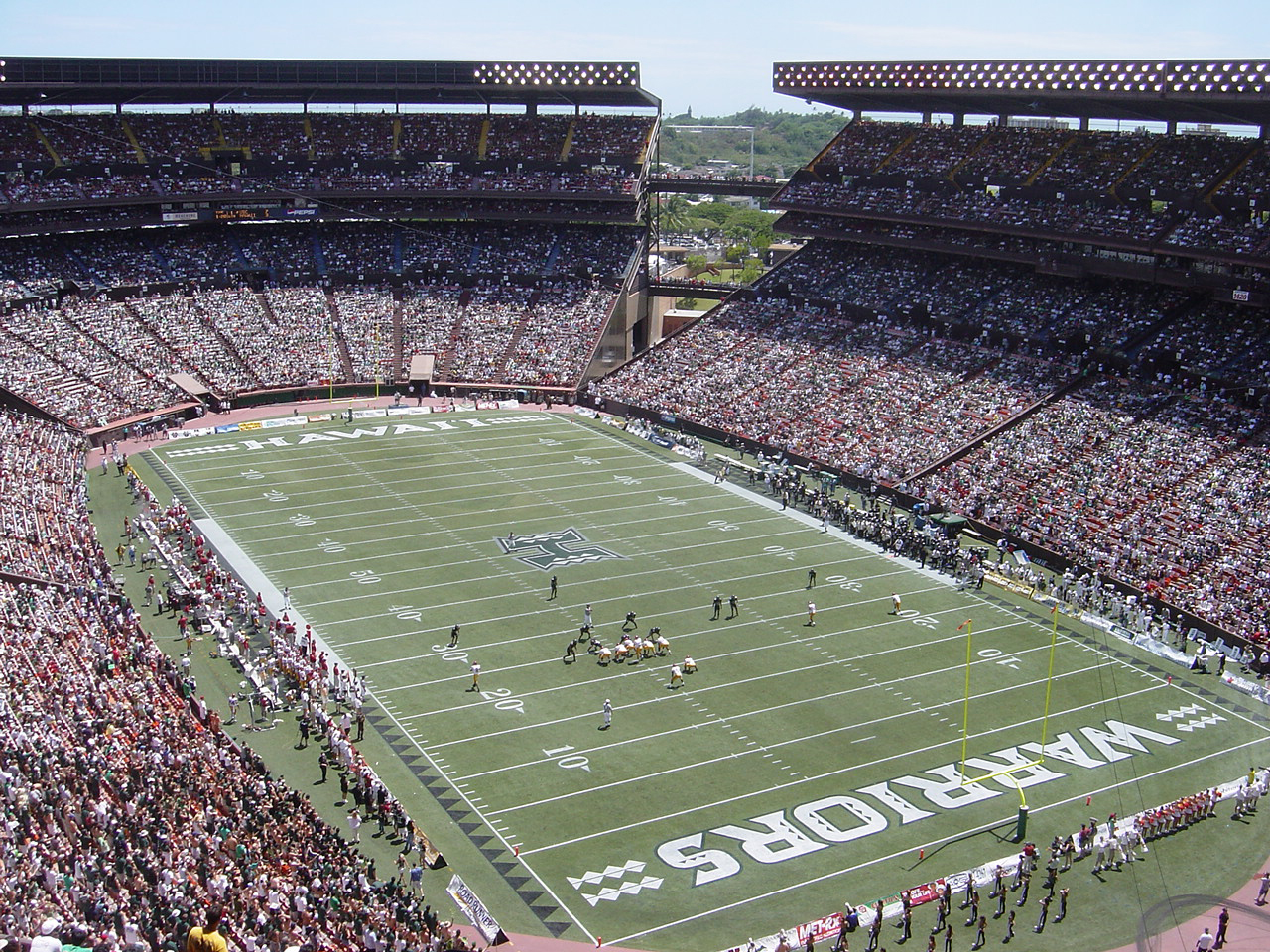
Aloha Stadium, the site of the 2004 Hawaii Bowl and the home field for the Hawaii Warriors. (2005 Hawaii-USC game shown)

The 2004 Hawaii Bowl kicked off at 2:06 p.m. HST (8:06 p.m. EST) on December 24, 2004, in Honolulu, Hawaii. The contest concluded at 6:12 p.m. HST, lasting a total of four hours and six minutes. Official attendance for the game was listed as 39,754, placing it at fifteenth highest in attendance for non-BCS bowls during the season. It also set an attendance record for the Hawaii Bowl and currently stands as the third-highest attended game. At kickoff, the weather was cloudy with a temperature of approximately 75 degrees. The wind was from the northeast at 6 miles per hour (10 km/h). There was a possibility of rain throughout the game, although only a minimal amount of rainfall was recorded.

=== First quarter ===
UAB won the ceremonial pre-game coin toss to select first possession and deferred its option to the second half; Hawaii elected to receive the opening kick. The Warriors began the game's opening drive at their own 20-yard line after the opening kickoff was fielded in the end zone for a touchback. On the team's first two plays, Timmy Chang threw an incompletion and a short pass to running back West Keliikipi. On a short third down, a rush by Chang was stopped one yard shy of a first down, forcing Hawaii to punt.

UAB started the scoring with a 51-yard touchdown strike from quarterback Darrell Hackney to wide receiver Roddy White. The extra point attempt was blocked, and UAB opened up a 6–0 lead. Hawaii came right back with a 74-yard touchdown pass from Timmy Chang to Jason Rivers to take a 7–6 lead. UAB's Dan Burks scored on a 4-yard touchdown run to make the score 13–7 UAB. However, the Warriors responded with a pair of touchdowns to take a 21–13 lead at the end of the first quarter. West Keliikipi scored first on a 4-yard run, and Chang threw a 29-yard pass to Gerald Welch for the second score.

=== Second quarter ===
In the second quarter, Nick Hayes opened the scoring with a 22-yard field goal to bring UAB within 21–16. Hawaii answered with a 13-yard touchdown pass from Chang to Chad Owens bringing the lead to 28–16. Norris Drinkard scored on a 10-yard touchdown run for UAB to cut the lead to 28–23. Hayes second field goal of the quarter from 36-yards out with three seconds remaining in the half trimmed the lead to 28–26.

=== Third quarter ===
Hawaii blew the game wide open in the third quarter. First, Chad Owens caught a 15-yard touchdown pass from Timmy Chang, and then he scored on a 59-yard punt return. A Justin Ayat 43-yard field goal pushed the lead to 45–26. UAB's Hackney scored on a 4-yard touchdown run to bring the score to 45–33, but the Warriors would not fold.

=== Fourth quarter ===
In the fourth quarter, Timmy Chang drove Hawaii the length of the field, and capped a time-consuming drive with a 4-yard touchdown run. Lance Rhodes caught a 17-yard touchdown pass from Hackney, to bring the score to 52–40. But the ensuing onside kick was returned by Hawaii's Britton Komine 42-yards for a Hawaii touchdown. That provided the final score, 59–40.

=== Scoring summary ===
Scoring summary

Quarter	Time	Drive			Team	Scoring information	Score	
Quarter	Time	Plays	Yards	TOP	Team	Scoring information	Hawaii	UAB
1	11:06	6	67	1:58	UAB	Roddy White 51-yard touchdown reception from Darrell Hackney, Nick Hayes kick no good (blocked)	0	6
1	10:45	1	74	00:12	Hawaii	Jason Rivers 74-yard touchdown reception from Timmy Chang, Justin Ayat kick good	7	6
1	8:19	8	80	2:21	UAB	Dan Burks 4-yard touchdown run, Nick Hayes kick good	7	13
1	5:32	6	83	2:42	Hawaii	West Keliikipi 4-yard touchdown run, Justin Ayat kick good	14	13
1	3:57	4	54	1:07	Hawaii	Gerald Welch 29-yard touchdown reception from Timmy Chang, Justin Ayat kick good	21	13
2	13:43	12	74	5:14	UAB	22-yard field goal by Nick Hayes	21	16
2	9:14	6	76	2:32	Hawaii	Chad Owens 13-yard touchdown reception from Timmy Chang, Justin Ayat kick good	28	16
2	6:03	8	67	3:02	UAB	Norris Drinkard 10-yard touchdown run, Nick Hayes kick good	28	23
2	00:03	10	52	2:29	UAB	37-yard field goal by Nick Hayes	28	26
3	11:47	4	36	1:22	Hawaii	Chad Owens 15-yard touchdown reception from Timmy Chang, Justin Ayat kick good	35	26
3	7:44	1	59	00:18	Hawaii	Chad Owens 59-yard punt return for a touchdown, Justin Ayat kick good	42	26
3	3:41	5	29	2:13	Hawaii	43-yard field goal by Justin Ayat	45	26
3	00:21	9	80	3:20	UAB	Darrell Hackney 4-yard touchdown run, Nick Hayes kick good	45	33
4	9:40	15	85	5:35	Hawaii	Timmy Chang 4-yard touchdown run, Justin Ayat kick good	52	33
4	2:06	7	54	2:40	UAB	Lance Rhodes 17-yard touchdown reception from Darrell Hackney, Nick Hayes kick good	52	40
4	1:55	1	42	00:10	Hawaii	Britton Komine 42-yard kickoff return for a touchdown, Justin Ayat kick good	59	40
"TOP" = time of possession. For other American football terms, see Glossary of American football.							59	40
