= 2010 SMU Mustangs football team =

American college football season

2010 SMU Mustangs football

C-USA West Division co-champion

C-USA Championship, L 7–17 vs. UCF

Armed Forces Bowl, L 14–16 vs. Army
- Conference: Conference USA
- West
- Record: 7–7 (6–2 CUSA)
- Head coach: June Jones (3rd season)
- Offensive scheme: Run and shoot
- Defensive coordinator: Tom Mason (3rd season)
- Base defense: 3–4
- Home stadium: Gerald J. Ford Stadium

Uniform

2010 Conference USA football standings
	Conf.			Overall
Team	W		L	W		L
East Division
No. 21 UCF x$	7	–	1	11	–	3
East Carolina	5	–	3	6	–	7
Southern Miss	5	–	3	8	–	5
Marshall	4	–	4	5	–	7
UAB	3	–	5	4	–	8
Memphis	0	–	8	1	–	11
West Division
SMU xy	6	–	2	7	–	7
No. 24 Tulsa x	6	–	2	10	–	3
Houston	4	–	4	5	–	7
UTEP	3	–	5	6	–	7
Rice	3	–	5	4	–	8
Tulane	2	–	6	4	–	8
Championship: UCF 17, SMU 7
$ – Conference champion; x – Division champion/co-champions; y – Championship game participant; As of January 11, 2011; Rankings from AP Poll

The 2010 SMU Mustangs football team represented Southern Methodist University in the 2010 NCAA Division I FBS football season. The Mustangs, led by third-year head coach June Jones, were members of Conference USA in the West Division and played their home games at Gerald J. Ford Stadium.

For the first time since the 1980s, the SMU Mustangs received a ranking point in both the pre-season AP Poll and the pre-season Coaches Poll

They finished the season 7–7, 6–2 in C-USA play and were co-champions of the west division with Tulsa. Due to their victory over Tulsa, the Mustangs represented the division in the 2010 Conference USA Championship Game where they were defeated by UCF 7–17. They were invited to the Armed Forces Bowl in their home stadium where they were defeated by Army 14–16.

== Schedule ==
Date	Time	Opponent	Site	TV	Result	Attendance
September 5	2:30 p.m.	at Texas Tech*	Jones AT&T Stadium; Lubbock, TX	ESPN	L 27–35	57,528
September 11	7:00 p.m.	UAB	Gerald J. Ford Stadium; University Park, TX		W 28–7	16,612
September 18	2:30 p.m.	Washington State*	Gerald J. Ford Stadium; University Park, TX	CBSCS	W 35–21	18,184
September 24	7:00 p.m.	No. 4 TCU*	Gerald J. Ford Stadium; University Park, TX (Battle for the Iron Skillet)	ESPN	L 24–41	35,481^{A}
October 2	6:00 p.m.	at Rice	Rice Stadium; Houston, TX (Battle for the Mayor's Cup)		W 42–31	14,981
October 9	7:00 p.m.	Tulsa	Gerald J. Ford Stadium; University Park, TX		W 21–18	19,329
October 16	2:30 p.m.	at Navy*	Navy–Marine Corps Memorial Stadium; Annapolis, MD (Gansz Trophy)	CBSCS	L 21–28	33,924
October 23	2:30 p.m.	Houston^{†}	Gerald J. Ford Stadium; University Park, TX (rivalry)	CBSCS	L 20–45	20,741
October 30	2:30 p.m.	at Tulane	Louisiana Superdome; New Orleans, LA		W 31–17	18,636
November 6	8:05 p.m.	at UTEP	Sun Bowl; El Paso, TX		L 14–28	23,127
November 20	2:00 p.m.	Marshall	Gerald J. Ford Stadium; University Park, TX		W 31–17	17,513
November 26	1:00 p.m.	at East Carolina	Dowdy–Ficklen Stadium; Greenville, North Carolina	CBSCS	W 45–38 ^{OT}	49,108
December 4	12:00 p.m.	at UCF	Bright House Networks Stadium; Orlando, Florida (C-USA Championship)	ESPN	L 7–17	41,045
December 30	11:00 a.m.	Army*	Gerald J. Ford Stadium; University Park, Texas (Armed Forces Bowl)	ESPN	L 14–16	36,742^{B}
*Non-conference game; ^{†}Homecoming; Rankings from AP Poll released prior to the game; All times are in Central time

- ^A Denotes the largest crowd to watch a football game at Gerald J. Ford Stadium. This breaks the record set in 2004 when the Mustangs hosted the Texas Tech Red Raiders.
- ^B Denotes the largest crowd to watch a football game at Gerald J. Ford Stadium, breaking the previous mark set earlier in the season.

== Game summaries ==
=== Texas Tech ===
	1	2	3	4	Total
SMU	0	7	10	10	27
Texas Tech	7	14	14	0	35

This game was the 48th meeting of the SMU Mustangs and the Texas Tech Red Raiders. The previous match-up was September 13, 2008, a game in which Texas Tech defeated SMU with a final score of 43–7. After the Mustangs lost in Lubbock, Texas Tech now leads the series 32–16. For his school-record 61 yard field goal, Matt Szymanski was named Conference USA Special Teams Player of the week.

=== UAB ===
	1	2	3	4	Total
UAB	7	0	0	0	7
SMU	0	14	7	7	28

This game will mark the 4th meeting of the SMU Mustangs and the UAB Blazers. They last met in the previous season on September 12, 2009, where SMU defeated UAB with a final score of 35 – 33. After the game, SMU now leads the series 4 – 0.

=== Washington State ===
	1	2	3	4	Total
Washington State	7	7	0	7	21
SMU	7	7	14	7	35

This game will mark the 2nd meeting of the SMU Mustangs and the Washington State Cougars. They last met in the previous season on September 19, 2009, where Washington State defeated SMU with a final score of 30 – 27. After the 2010 meeting, the series stands at 1 – 1. It was the first win for the Mustangs against a school from a BCS conference since they defeated Kansas 31-17 on September 2, 2000.

=== TCU ===
	1	2	3	4	Total
#4 TCU	7	7	14	13	41
SMU	7	3	7	7	24

This game will mark the 89th meeting of the SMU Mustangs and the TCU Horned Frogs. They last met in the previous season on October 3, 2009, where TCU defeated SMU with a final score of 39 – 14. After the 2010 meeting, TCU leads the series 43 – 39 – 7. The two teams have a storied cross-town rivalry and will contend for the Iron Skillet trophy in the Battle for the Iron Skillet.

=== Rice ===
	1	2	3	4	Total
SMU	7	7	14	14	42
Rice	0	3	7	21	31

This game will mark the 88th meeting of the SMU Mustangs and the Rice Owls. They last met in the previous season on November 7, 2009, where SMU defeated Rice with a final score of 31 – 28. After the 2010 meeting, SMU now leads the series 47 – 40 – 1. The two teams have a storied cross-state rivalry and will contend for the Mayor's Cup trophy in the Battle for the Mayor's Cup. It was SMU's first win in Rice Stadium since 1986 before SMU received the Death Penalty for the 1987–88 seasons. Quarterback Kyle Padron was named Conference USA Offensive Player of the Week for his performance in the game which included three touchdowns, zero interceptions and 371 total yards.

=== Tulsa ===
	1	2	3	4	Total
Tulsa	7	0	3	8	18
SMU	7	7	7	0	21

This game will mark the 18th meeting of the SMU Mustangs and the Tulsa Golden Hurricane. They last met in the previous season on October 31, 2009, where SMU defeated Tulsa with a final score of 27 – 13. After SMU won the 2010 matchup, SMU now leads the series 12 – 6.

=== Navy ===
	1	2	3	4	Total
SMU	7	7	0	7	21
Navy	0	0	14	14	28

This game will mark the 15th meeting of the SMU Mustangs and the Navy Midshipmen. They last met in the previous season on October 17, 2009, where Navy defeated SMU with a final score of 38 – 35. After the 2010 meeting, Navy leads the series 8 – 7. The two schools now compete for the Gansz Trophy named after Frank Gansz who played a significant role in both school's football programs.

=== Houston ===
	1	2	3	4	Total
Houston	7	17	7	14	45
SMU	7	3	7	3	20

This game will mark the 26th meeting of the SMU Mustangs and the Houston Cougars. They last met in the previous season on October 24, 2009, where Houston defeated SMU with a final score of 38 – 15. After the 2010 meeting, Houston leads the series 16 – 9 – 1.

=== Tulane ===
	1	2	3	4	Total
SMU	0	3	7	21	31
Tulane	0	7	10	0	17

This game will mark the 19th meeting of the SMU Mustangs and the Tulane Green Wave. They last met in the previous season on November 28, 2009, where SMU defeated Tulane with a final score of 26 – 21. After the 2010 meeting, Tulane leads the series 12 – 7.

=== UTEP ===
	1	2	3	4	Total
SMU	0	7	7	0	14
UTEP	14	7	0	7	28

This game will mark the 18th meeting of the SMU Mustangs and the UTEP Miners. They last met in the previous season on November 14, 2009, where SMU defeated UTEP with a final score of 35 – 31. After losing 14-28, SMU leads the series 10 – 8.

=== Marshall ===
	1	2	3	4	Total
Marshall	0	0	10	7	17
SMU	7	17	7	0	31

This game will mark the 4th meeting of the SMU Mustangs and the Marshall Thundering Herd. They last met in the previous season on November 21, 2009, where Marshall defeated SMU with a final score of 34 – 31. After SMU won the 2010 match 31-17, the series is tied 2 – 2.

=== East Carolina ===
	1	2	3	4	OT	Total
SMU	0	10	21	7	7	45
East Carolina	14	0	3	21	0	38

This game will mark the 4th meeting of the SMU Mustangs and the East Carolina Pirates. They last met in the previous season on October 10, 2009, where SMU defeated East Carolina with a final score of 28 – 21. After SMU's 45-38 victory, the series is now tied at 2 – 2.

=== UCF–Conference USA Football Championship Game ===
	1	2	3	4	Total
SMU	0	0	0	7	7
UCF	7	3	7	0	17

This game will mark the 3rd meeting of the SMU Mustangs and the UCF Knights. They last met in 2008, where UCF defeated SMU with a final score of 31 – 17. The all-time series stands in UCF's favor 2-0.

=== Army–Armed Forces Bowl ===
	1	2	3	4	Total
Army	13	3	0	0	16
SMU	0	0	7	7	14

== Roster ==
2010 SMU Mustangs football team roster
Players
Coaches
Offense

Pos.	#	Name	Class
OT	70	Kelvin Beachum	Jr
WR	11	Cole Beasley	Jr
G	77	Josh LeRibeus	Jr
RB	48	Zach Line	So
QB	2	Kyle Padron	So
WR	24	Aldrick Robinson	Sr

Defense

Pos.	#	Name	Class
DB	23	Chris Banjo	Jr
DB	2	Sterling Moore	Sr
LB	56	Ja'Gared Davis	So

Special teams

Pos.	#	Name	Class
K	6	Matt Szymanski	Sr

Head coach

- June Jones

Coordinators/assistant coaches

Legend

- (C) Team captain
- (S) Suspended
- (I) Ineligible
- Injured
- Redshirt

Roster

== NFL draft ==
6th Round, 178th Overall Pick by the Washington Redskins—Sr. WR Aldrick Robinson
