= 2010 Tulsa Golden Hurricane football team =

American college football season

2010 Tulsa Golden Hurricane football

C-USA West Division co-champion Hawaii Bowl champion

Hawaii Bowl, W 62–35 vs. Hawaii
- Conference: Conference USA
- West Division

Ranking
- AP: No. 24
- Record: 10–3 (6–2 C-USA)
- Head coach: Todd Graham (4th season)
- Offensive coordinator: Chad Morris (1st season)
- Offensive scheme: Spread
- Co-defensive coordinators: Keith Patterson (5th season); Paul Randolph (4th season)
- Base defense: 3–3–5
- Home stadium: Skelly Field at H. A. Chapman Stadium

2010 Conference USA football standings
	Conf.			Overall
Team	W		L	W		L
East Division
No. 21 UCF x$	7	–	1	11	–	3
East Carolina	5	–	3	6	–	7
Southern Miss	5	–	3	8	–	5
Marshall	4	–	4	5	–	7
UAB	3	–	5	4	–	8
Memphis	0	–	8	1	–	11
West Division
SMU xy	6	–	2	7	–	7
No. 24 Tulsa x	6	–	2	10	–	3
Houston	4	–	4	5	–	7
UTEP	3	–	5	6	–	7
Rice	3	–	5	4	–	8
Tulane	2	–	6	4	–	8
Championship: UCF 17, SMU 7
$ – Conference champion; x – Division champion/co-champions; y – Championship game participant; As of January 11, 2011; Rankings from AP Poll

The 2010 Tulsa Golden Hurricane football team represented the University of Tulsa in the 2010 NCAA Division I FBS football season. The Golden Hurricane, led by fourth-year head coach Todd Graham, were members of Conference USA (C-USA) in the West Division and played their home games at Skelly Field at H. A. Chapman Stadium, also known simply as Chapman Stadium. They finished the season 10–3, 6–2 in C-USA to claim a share of the west division title. However, due to their loss to SMU, they did not represent the division in the 2010 Conference USA Championship Game. They were invited to the Hawaii Bowl, where they defeated Hawaii, 62–35. On January 9, 2011, Chad Morris left to fill the offensive coordinator job at Clemson University.

On January 10, 2011, Todd Graham announced he was leaving Tulsa to take the head coaching job at the University of Pittsburgh.

== Schedule ==
Date	Time	Opponent	Site	TV	Result	Attendance	Source
September 5	1:00 p.m.	at East Carolina	Dowdy–Ficklen Stadium; Greenville, NC	ESPN2	L 49–51	50,010	
September 11	6:00 p.m.	Bowling Green*	Skelly Field at H. A. Chapman Stadium; Tulsa, OK		W 33–20	19,565	
September 18	6:00 p.m.	at Oklahoma State*	Boone Pickens Stadium; Stillwater, OK (rivalry)		L 28–65	51,778	
September 25	6:00 p.m.	Central Arkansas*	Skelly Field at H. A. Chapman Stadium; Tulsa, OK		W 41–14	21,928	
October 2	6:00 p.m.	at Memphis	Liberty Bowl Memorial Stadium; Memphis, TN		W 48–7	22,231	
October 9	7:00 p.m.	at SMU	Gerald J. Ford Stadium; University Park, TX		L 18–21	19,329	
October 16	6:00 p.m.	Tulane^{†}	Skelly Field at H. A. Chapman Stadium; Tulsa, OK		W 52–24	23,295	
October 30	1:30 p.m.	at Notre Dame*	Notre Dame Stadium; Notre Dame, IN	NBC	W 28–27	80,795	
November 6	1:00 p.m.	Rice	Skelly Field at H. A. Chapman Stadium; Tulsa, OK		W 64–27	19,036	
November 13	7:00 p.m.	at Houston	Robertson Stadium; Houston, TX	CBSCS	W 28–25	30,046	
November 20	1:00 p.m.	UTEP	Skelly Field at H. A. Chapman Stadium; Tulsa, OK		W 31–28	16,547	
November 26	5:30 p.m.	Southern Miss	Skelly Field at H. A. Chapman Stadium; Tulsa, OK	CBSCS	W 56–50	21,901	
December 24	7:00 p.m.	at No. 24 Hawaii*	Aloha Stadium; Halawa, HI (Hawaii Bowl)	ESPN	W 62–35	43,673	
*Non-conference game; ^{†}Homecoming; Rankings from AP Poll released prior to the game; All times are in Central time

== Game summaries ==
=== At East Carolina ===
	1	2	3	4	Total
Golden Hurricane	7	9	13	20	49
Pirates	10	7	7	27	51

Statistics	TLSA	ECU
First downs	27	27
Total yards	579	538
Rushing yards	180	155
Passing yards	399	383
Turnovers	2	1
Time of possession	31:43	28:17

Team	Category	Player	Statistics
Tulsa	Passing	G. J. Kinne	28/43, 399 yards, 5 TD, INT
Tulsa	Rushing	Damaris Johnson	7 rushes, 56 yards, TD
Tulsa	Receiving	Charles Clay	8 receptions, 86 yards, TD
East Carolina	Passing	Dominique Davis	27/46, 383 yards, 5 TD, INT
East Carolina	Rushing	Jonathan Williams	15 rushes, 92 yards, TD
East Carolina	Receiving	Dwayne Harris	7 receptions, 121 yards, 2 TD

== After the season ==
=== 2011 NFL draft ===
The following Golden Hurricane player was selected in the 2011 NFL draft following the season.

Round	Pick	Player	Position	NFL club
6	174	Charles Clay	Tight end	Miami Dolphins
