= 2010 Memphis Tigers football team =

American college football season

2010 Memphis Tigers football
- Conference: Conference USA
- East
- Record: 1–11 (0–8 C-USA)
- Head coach: Larry Porter (1st season)
- Offensive coordinator: Eric Price (1st season)
- Offensive scheme: Multiple
- Defensive coordinator: Jay Hopson (1st season)
- Base defense: Multiple
- Home stadium: Liberty Bowl Memorial Stadium

2010 Conference USA football standings
	Conf.			Overall
Team	W		L	W		L
East Division
No. 21 UCF x$	7	–	1	11	–	3
East Carolina	5	–	3	6	–	7
Southern Miss	5	–	3	8	–	5
Marshall	4	–	4	5	–	7
UAB	3	–	5	4	–	8
Memphis	0	–	8	1	–	11
West Division
SMU xy	6	–	2	7	–	7
No. 24 Tulsa x	6	–	2	10	–	3
Houston	4	–	4	5	–	7
UTEP	3	–	5	6	–	7
Rice	3	–	5	4	–	8
Tulane	2	–	6	4	–	8
Championship: UCF 17, SMU 7
$ – Conference champion; x – Division champion/co-champions; y – Championship game participant; As of January 11, 2011; Rankings from AP Poll

The 2010 Memphis Tigers football team represented the University of Memphis in the 2010 NCAA Division I FBS college football season. The Tigers were led by head coach Larry Porter, who was in his first season. The Tigers played their home games at Liberty Bowl Memorial Stadium and are members of Conference USA in its East Division. They finished the season 1–11, 0–8 in C-USA play.

== Schedule ==
Date	Time	Opponent	Site	TV	Result	Attendance
September 4	6:00 p.m.	at Mississippi State*	Davis Wade Stadium; Starkville, MS		L 7–49	56,032
September 11	11:00 a.m.	at East Carolina	Dowdy–Ficklen Stadium; Greenville, NC	CSS	L 27–49	48,123
September 18	6:00 p.m.	Middle Tennessee*	Liberty Bowl Memorial Stadium; Memphis, TN		W 24–17	27,965
September 25	8:05 p.m.	at UTEP	Sun Bowl Stadium; El Paso, TX		L 13–16	29,765
October 2	6:00 p.m.	Tulsa	Liberty Bowl Memorial Stadium; Memphis, TN		L 7–48	22,231
October 9	1:00 p.m.	at Louisville*	Papa John's Cardinal Stadium; Louisville, KY (rivalry)	ESPN3	L 0–56	48,427
October 16	11:00 a.m.	Southern Miss	Liberty Bowl Memorial Stadium; Memphis, TN (Black and Blue Bowl)	CSS	L 19–41	18,848
October 30	6:00 p.m.	Houston^{†}	Liberty Bowl Memorial Stadium; Memphis, TN	CSS	L 17–56	19,731
November 6	7:00 p.m.	Tennessee*	Liberty Bowl Memorial Stadium; Memphis, TN	CBSCS	L 14–50	39,742
November 13	2:00 p.m.	at Marshall	Joan C. Edwards Stadium; Huntington, WV		L 13–28	25,108
November 20	3:00 p.m.	at UAB	Legion Field; Birmingham, AL (Battle for the Bones)		L 15–31	16,177
November 27	11:00 a.m.	UCF	Liberty Bowl Memorial Stadium; Memphis, TN	CSS	L 17–37	14,992
*Non-conference game; ^{†}Homecoming; All times are in Central time
