= 2010 Tulane Green Wave football team =

American college football season

2010 Tulane Green Wave football
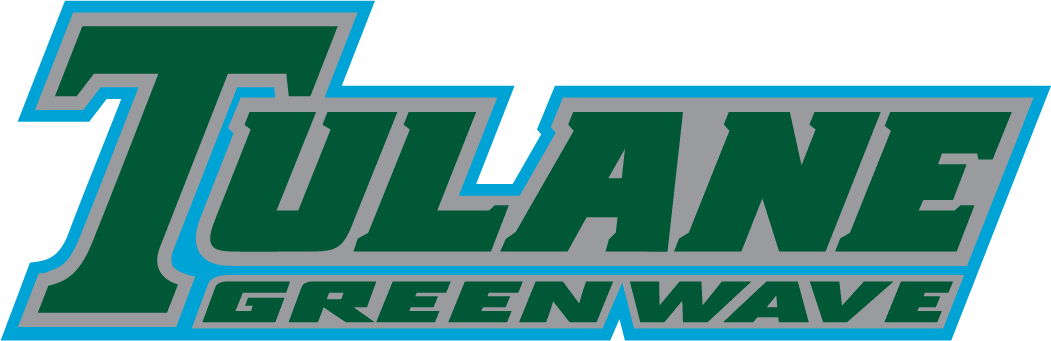
- Conference: Conference USA
- West
- Record: 4–8 (2–6 CUSA)
- Head coach: Bob Toledo (4th season)
- Offensive coordinator: Dan Dodd (4th season)
- Offensive scheme: West Coast
- Defensive coordinator: Steve Stanard (2nd season)
- Base defense: 4–3
- Home stadium: Louisiana Superdome

2010 Conference USA football standings
	Conf.			Overall
Team	W		L	W		L
East Division
No. 21 UCF x$	7	–	1	11	–	3
East Carolina	5	–	3	6	–	7
Southern Miss	5	–	3	8	–	5
Marshall	4	–	4	5	–	7
UAB	3	–	5	4	–	8
Memphis	0	–	8	1	–	11
West Division
SMU xy	6	–	2	7	–	7
No. 24 Tulsa x	6	–	2	10	–	3
Houston	4	–	4	5	–	7
UTEP	3	–	5	6	–	7
Rice	3	–	5	4	–	8
Tulane	2	–	6	4	–	8
Championship: UCF 17, SMU 7
$ – Conference champion; x – Division champion/co-champions; y – Championship game participant; As of January 11, 2011; Rankings from AP Poll

The 2010 Tulane Green Wave football team represented Tulane University in the 2010 college football season. The Green Wave, led by fourth-year head coach Bob Toledo, are members of Conference USA in the West Division and played their home games at the Louisiana Superdome. They finished the season 4–8, 2–6 in C-USA play.

== Schedule ==
Date	Time	Opponent	Site	TV	Result	Attendance
September 2	7:00 pm	Southeastern Louisiana*	Louisiana Superdome; New Orleans		W 27–21	20,258
September 11	8:00 pm	Ole Miss*	Louisiana Superdome; New Orleans	ESPN Classic	L 13–27	36,389
September 25	2:30 pm	at Houston	Robertson Stadium; Houston, Texas	CBSCS	L 23–42	32,007
October 2	1:00 pm	at Rutgers*	Rutgers Stadium; Piscataway, New Jersey	ESPN3	W 17–14	47,963
October 9	2:30 pm	Army*^{†}	Louisiana Superdome; New Orleans		L 23–41	28,756
October 16	6:00 pm	at Tulsa	Chapman Stadium; Tulsa, Oklahoma		L 24–52	23,295
October 23	8:05 pm	at UTEP	Sun Bowl; El Paso, Texas		W 34–24	25,007
October 30	2:30 pm	SMU	Louisiana Superdome; New Orleans		L 17–31	18,636
November 6	2:30 pm	Southern Miss	Louisiana Superdome; New Orleans (Battle for the Bell)		L 30–46	22,737
November 13	2:30 pm	Rice	Louisiana Superdome; New Orleans		W 54–49	16,698
November 20	2:30 pm	Central Florida	Louisiana Superdome; New Orleans		L 14–61	19,069
November 26	11:00 am	at Marshall	Joan C. Edwards Stadium; Huntington, West Virginia	CBSCS	L 23–38	19,302
*Non-conference game; ^{†}Homecoming; All times are in Central time

== Roster ==
2010 Tulane Green Wave football team roster
Players
Coaches
Offense

Pos.	#	Name	Class
WR	3	Ryan Grant	Fr
QB	11	Ryan Griffin	So
RB	26	Orleans Darkwa	Fr

Defense

Pos.	#	Name	Class

Special teams

Pos.	#	Name	Class

Head coach

- Bob Toledo

Coordinators/assistant coaches

- Jason Rollins
  (Defensive backs coach)

Legend

- (C) Team captain
- (S) Suspended
- (I) Ineligible
- Injured
- Redshirt
