= Jacob Zeno =

American football player

No. 9 – Texas A&M Aggies
- Position: Quarterback
- Class: (redshirt) Senior

Personal information
- Listed height: 6 ft 4 in (1.93 m)
- Listed weight: 210 lb (95 kg)

Career information
- High school: John Jay (San Antonio, Texas)
- College: Baylor (2019–2021); UAB (2022–2024); Texas A&M (2025)
- Stats at ESPN

Jacob Zeno is an American college football quarterback for the Texas A&M Aggies. He previously played for the Baylor Bears and the UAB Blazers.

== Early life ==
Zeno grew up in San Antonio, Texas and attended John Jay High School. During high school, he completed 1,387 yards and 14 touchdowns as a senior. He was rated a four-star recruit and committed to play college football at Baylor over offers from Florida, Georgia, Missouri, NC State, Boston College, North Carolina and Arkansas.

== College career ==
=== Baylor ===
Zeno was an early enrollee for January 2019. During his true freshman year, he appeared in three games and finished the season by completing all three of his passing attempts for 41 yards, rushing twice for seven yards and got a touchdown during his debut game against Kansas. During the 2020 season, he only played for the last game of the season and finished the season by completing five out of eight passing attempts through the air for 18 yards and also ran the ball four times for 13 yards. During the 2021 season, Zeno appeared in two games and finished the season by completing one out of three passing attempts through the air for 41 yards.

On September 28, 2021, it was announced that Zeno had entered the transfer portal. On December 15, 2021, it was announced that Zeno had transferred to UAB.

=== UAB ===
During the 2022 season, Zeno appeared in nine games and started two of them. He was named the starting quarterback since the Week 7 game against Western Kentucky where the team's starting quarterback of the game, Dylan Hopkins suffered an injury after picking up a first down on a third down scramble and ultimately having Zeno finishing the game. He finished the season by completing 58 out of 102 passing attempts for 721 yards, five touchdowns and two interceptions. During the 2022 Bahamas Bowl, Zeno completed only one out of four attempts for 48 yards.

On August 17, 2023, prior to the 2023 season, Zeno was named to the Earl Campbell Tyler Rose Award Watch List. During the 2023 season, Zeno set a school record of completing 38 out of 41 passing attempts for 291 yards and three touchdowns during the Week 1 game against North Carolina A&T. Because of his performance, he was named to the AAC Week 1 Honor Roll.

On December 2, 2024, Zeno announced that he would enter the transfer portal.

=== Texas A&M ===
On December 10, 2024, Zeno announced that he would transfer to Texas A&M.

=== College statistics ===
Year	Team	Games			Passing								Rushing			
Year	Team	GP	GS	Record	Cmp	Att	Pct	Yds	Avg	TD	Int	Rtg	Att	Yds	Avg	TD
2019	Baylor	3	0	—	9	18	50.0	223	12.4	1	1	161.3	8	−9	−1.1	1
2020	Baylor	1	0	—	5	8	62.5	18	2.2	0	0	81.4	4	13	3.3	0
2021	Baylor	2	0	—	1	3	33.3	41	13.7	0	0	148.1	2	−3	−1.0	0
2022	UAB	9	2	0−2	58	102	56.9	721	7.1	5	3	126.5	32	94	2.9	1
2023	UAB	11	11	4−7	279	379	73.6	3,126	8.2	20	9	155.6	91	168	1.8	4
2024	UAB	4	4	1−3	82	118	69.5	819	6.9	6	5	136.1	37	97	2.6	0
2025	Texas A&M	1	0	0−0	2	5	40.0	27	5.4	0	0	85.4	0	0	0.0	0
Career		31	17	5−12	436	633	68.9	4,975	7.9	32	18	145.9	175	360	2.1	6
