= Austin Watkins =

American football player (born 1998)

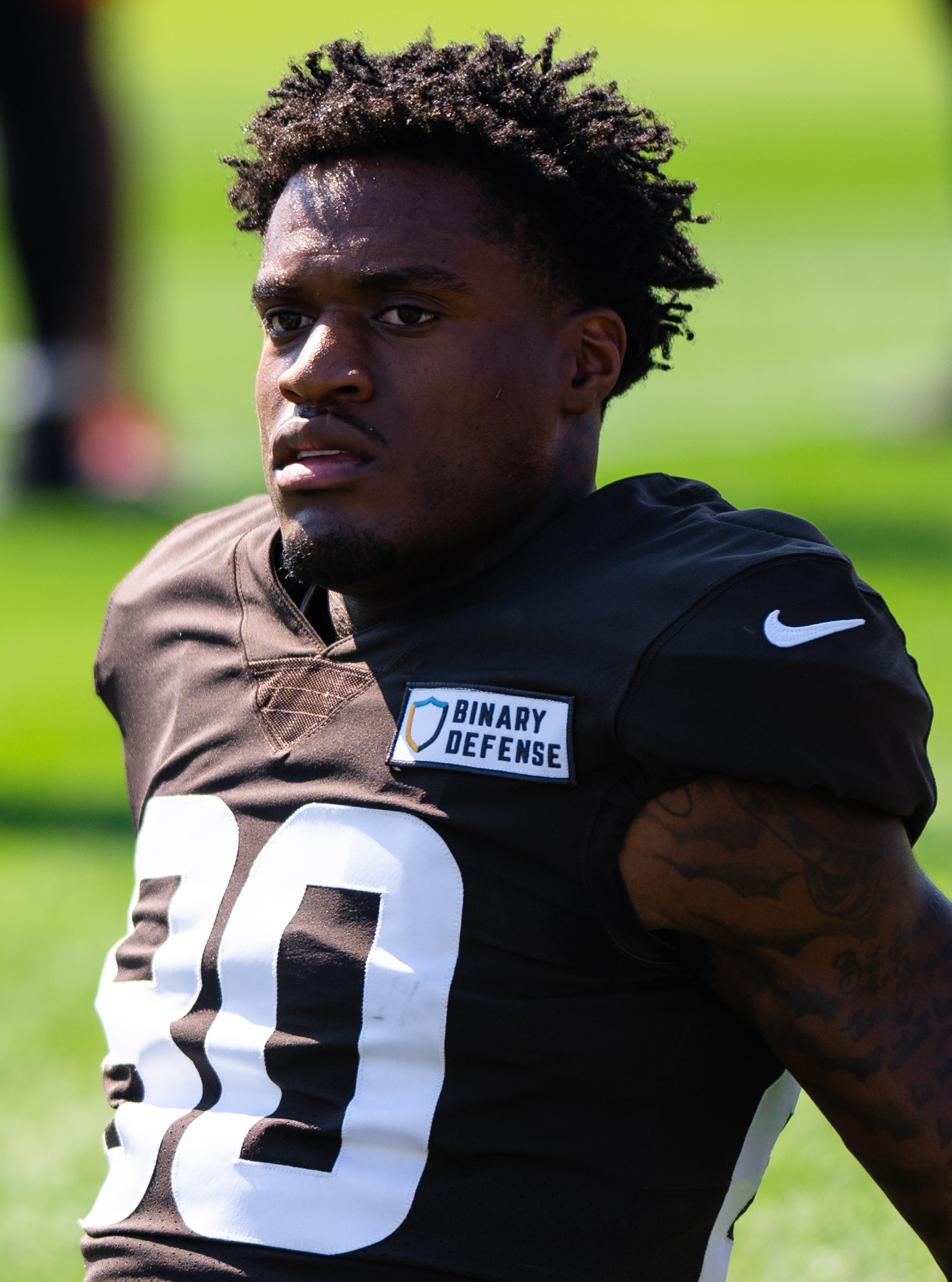
- Watkins with the Cleveland Browns in 2023

Profile
- Position: Wide receiver

Personal information
- Born: February 16, 1998 (age 28); Fort Myers, Florida, U.S.
- Listed height: 6 ft 2 in (1.88 m)
- Listed weight: 210 lb (95 kg)

Career information
- High school: North Fort Myers (FL)
- College: Dodge City CC (2016–2017); UAB (2018–2020)
- NFL draft: 2021: undrafted

Career history
- San Francisco 49ers (2021)*; Tampa Bay Buccaneers (2022)*; Saskatchewan Roughriders (2022)*; Memphis Showboats (2023)*; Birmingham Stallions (2023); Cleveland Browns (2023); Philadelphia Eagles (2024)*; Birmingham Stallions (2025); Montreal Alouettes (2026)
- * Offseason or practice squad member only

Awards and highlights
- USFL champion (2023); First-team All-Conference USA (2020); Second-team All-Conference USA (2019)
- Stats at Pro Football Reference
- Stats at CFL.ca

Austin Watkins Jr. (born February 16, 1998) is an American professional football wide receiver. He played college football for the Dodge City Conquistadors and UAB Blazers. Watkins has also been a member of the San Francisco 49ers, Tampa Bay Buccaneers, Saskatchewan Roughriders, Memphis Showboats, and Cleveland Browns.

== Early life ==
Watkins grew up in Fort Myers, Florida, and attended North Fort Myers High School.

== College career ==
Watkins began his collegiate career at Dodge City Community College. As a freshman, he caught 38 passes for 376 yards and one touchdown and committed to transfer to UAB after his sophomore season. Watkins had 24 receptions for 330 yards with four touchdowns as a sophomore.

Watkins played in four games in his first season with the Blazers before opting to redshirt the year. He became a starter going into his redshirt junior season was named second-team All-Conference USA after catching 57 passes for 1,092 yards and six touchdowns. As a redshirt senior, Watkins was named first-team All-Conference USA after finishing the season with 34 receptions for 468 yards with three touchdowns.

== Professional career ==
Pre-draft measurables
Height	Weight	Arm length	Hand span	Wingspan	40-yard dash	10-yard split	20-yard split	Bench press
6 ft 1 1/2 in (1.87 m)	207 lb (94 kg)	31 in (0.79 m)	9 1/2 in (0.24 m)	6 ft 4 in (1.93 m)	4.53 s	1.71 s	2.75 s	18 reps
All values from Pro Day

=== San Francisco 49ers ===
Watkins signed with the San Francisco 49ers as an undrafted free agent on May 13, 2021. He was waived/injured on August 17, and placed on injured reserve. Watkins was released by San Francisco on August 25. He was re-signed to the 49ers' practice squad on November 3. Watkins was again released by San Francisco on November 23.

=== Tampa Bay Buccaneers ===
On January 31, 2022, Watkins signed a reserve/future contract with the Tampa Bay Buccaneers. He was waived on May 16.

=== Saskatchewan Roughriders ===
Watkins signed with Saskatchewan Roughriders of the Canadian Football League (CFL) on August 7, 2022. He was released by the Roughriders on August 18, having spent the entirety of his tenure with the club on the practice roster.

=== Memphis Showboats ===
Watkins signed with the Tampa Bay Bandits of the United States Football League (USFL) on October 22, 2022. Watkins and all other Tampa Bay Bandits players were all transferred to the Memphis Showboats after it was announced that the Bandits were taking a hiatus and that the Showboats were joining the league.

=== Birmingham Stallions (first stint) ===
Watkins was traded to the Birmingham Stallions on January 11, 2023. He was released by the Stallions on July 22, to sign with an NFL team.

=== Cleveland Browns ===
On July 22, 2023, Watkins signed with the Cleveland Browns. Watkins led the Browns in receiving yards in each of their first three preseason games in 2023. He was waived on August 29, and re-signed to the practice squad. He was not signed to a reserve/future contract by the team after the season and thus became a free agent upon the expiration of his practice squad contract.

=== Philadelphia Eagles ===
On January 18, 2024, Watkins signed a reserve/future contract with the Philadelphia Eagles. He was waived on August 27.

=== Birmingham Stallions (second stint) ===
On October 30, 2024, Watkins re-signed with the Birmingham Stallions. He was released on May 14, 2025.

=== Montreal Alouettes ===
On December 15, 2025, Watkins signed with the Montreal Alouettes of the Canadian Football League (CFL). He was released on June 29, 2026.

== Personal life ==
Watkins is the cousin of NFL wide receiver and Super Bowl LIV champion, Sammy Watkins, and Super Bowl LII champion, Jaylen Watkins. His younger cousin, Winston Watkins Jr., is committed to play for the University of Colorado in the class of 2025.
