= Muffed punt =

Play outcome in gridiron football

In gridiron football, a muffed punt is defined as "touching of the ball prior to possessing the ball.”

A muffed punt occurs when there is an "uncontrolled touch" of the football by a player on the returning team after it is punted. This can occur when:

- The kicking team interferes with the other team's right to catch the punt
- A player on the kicking team is struck unaware by the football running down-field to cover the punt.
- A player attempts to return the ball, makes contact with it but cannot retain the ball in his hands and it comes loose.

To be a fumble, the receiving team must possess the football, then lose control. In the case of a fumble, the ball is live and can be returned by the team that recovers the ball. In the case of a muffed punt, it is possible for the punting team to recover the ball and continue the drive, but at least in NCAA and NFL rules, they cannot advance the ball on that same play. Rules vary by league about how to handle a muffed punt.

In the NFL, a muffed punt recovered by the kicking team cannot be challenged by a coach for review because all turnovers are automatically reviewed.
