= Neil Callaway =

American football player and coach (born 1955)

Biographical details
- Born: November 15, 1955 (age 70); Macon, Georgia, U.S.

Playing career
- 1974–1977: Alabama
- Positions: Guard, tackle, defensive end, nose guard, linebacker

Coaching career (HC unless noted)
- 1978–1979: East Carolina (assistant)
- 1980: Wyoming (assistant)
- 1981–1992: Auburn (OL)
- 1993–1996: Houston (AHC/OC)
- 1997: Alabama (OL)
- 1998–2000: Alabama (OC/OL)
- 2001–2006: Georgia (OC/OL)
- 2007–2011: UAB
- 2013–2015: Western Kentucky (OL)
- 2016–2018: USC (OL)
- 2020: Purdue (OA)
- 2021: Purdue (AOL)
- 2022: Michigan Panthers (OL)
- 2023: Birmingham Stallions (OL)

Head coaching record
- Overall: 18–42

Accomplishments and honors

Championships
- USFL champion (2023)

Claude Neil Callaway (born November 15, 1955) is an American college football coach and former player who was most recently the offensive line coach for the Birmingham Stallions of the United Football League (UFL). Callaway served as the head football coach at University of Alabama at Birmingham (UAB) from 2007 to 2011, compiling a record of 18–42. A 1974 graduate of Central High School in Macon, Georgia, he played collegiately at the University of Alabama for coach Bear Bryant as a lineman and linebacker before graduating in 1978.

== Playing career ==
Callaway played for Bear Bryant at Alabama as an offensive lineman, defensive lineman, and linebacker from 1974 to 1977. The Tide won three Southeastern Conference titles while he was a player and finished No. 2 in the final AP Poll in 1977. He was named the team's "Most Outstanding Athlete" following his senior season.

== Coaching career ==
Callaway began his coaching career as a part of Pat Dye's staff at East Carolina University and the University of Wyoming before following Dye to Auburn University as offensive line coach. In twelve years with Auburn, the team won a share of four Southeastern Conference titles and Callaway coached four All-Americans.

In 1993, Callaway became offensive coordinator and assistant head coach at the University of Houston, where the team won a Conference USA title, before returning to his alma mater as offensive line coach for the Tide in 1997 and offensive coordinator from 1998-2000. In 2001, he joined Mark Richt's staff at the University of Georgia as line coach and coordinator, where the team won three SEC division titles and two conference championships in six years there.

Callaway left Georgia in January 2007 to take the UAB head coaching position. He had not been widely linked to any other head coaching jobs, and was considered a sleeper choice by UAB. UAB was rumored to have initially offered the job to Pat Sullivan (then UAB offensive coordinator) and later to Jimbo Fisher, leading many to speculate that the UA Board of Trustees vetoed the contract offers preventing UAB from hiring more sought after coaches and instead appointing Callaway as the new head coach as a ploy to keep the program in a lower status than Alabama's own.

Callaway left UAB's head coaching job on November 27, 2011, having compiled a record of 18 wins and 42 losses during his five years with the Blazers (18–42).The board blocked a proposal to fund an on-campus football field at UAB which meant players had to travel for practice, and the facilities were far from being up to par.

On February 26, 2013, Callaway was hired by Western Kentucky head coach Bobby Petrino to serve as the Hilltoppers' offensive line coach.

On January 4, 2016, Callaway was hired by USC. On October 29, 2018, head coach Clay Helton relieved Callaway of his duties.

In 2020, he was hired by Jeff Brohm at Purdue as a senior analyst. In 2021, he was promoted to assistant offensive line coach. On January 12, 2021, he retired from coaching.

The retirement didn't last long though, as Callaway was announced as the offensive line coach for the Michigan Panthers of the USFL in March 2022.

== Personal life ==
Callaway is married and has three children. His son, Russ Callaway is the current co-offensive coordinator and tight ends coach for the Florida Gators.

== Head coaching record ==
Year	Team	Overall	Conference	Standing	Bowl/playoffs
UAB Blazers (Conference USA) (2007–2011)
2007	UAB	2–10	1–7	6th (East)	
2008	UAB	4–8	3–5	T–4th (East)	
2009	UAB	5–7	4–4	T–4th (East)	
2010	UAB	4–8	3–5	5th (East)	
2011	UAB	3–9	3–5	T–4th (East)	
UAB:		18–42	14–26		
Total:		18–42			
