= Darrin Reaves =

American football player (born 1993)

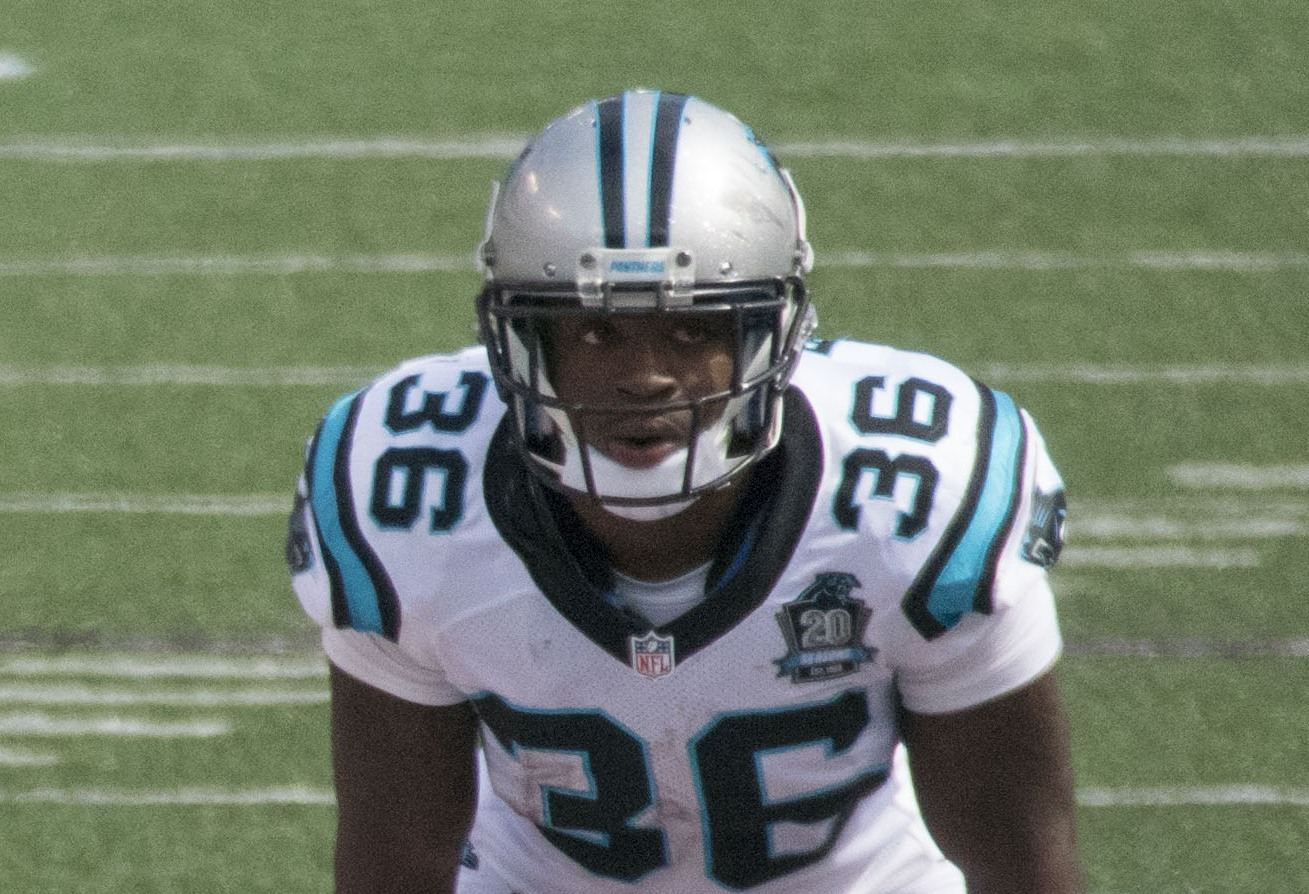
- Reaves with the Carolina Panthers in 2014

No. 36
- Position: Running back

Personal information
- Born: April 17, 1993 (age 33); Birmingham, Alabama, U.S.
- Listed height: 5 ft 9 in (1.75 m)
- Listed weight: 215 lb (98 kg)

Career information
- High school: Clay-Chalkville (AL)
- College: UAB
- NFL draft: 2014: undrafted

Career history
- Carolina Panthers (2014); Kansas City Chiefs (2015–2016)*
- * Offseason or practice squad member only

Awards and highlights
- First-team All-C-USA (2012)

Career NFL statistics
- Rushing attempts: 31
- Rushing yards: 78
- Receptions: 5
- Receiving yards: 31
- Stats at Pro Football Reference

Darrin Reaves (born April 17, 1993) is an American former professional football player who was a running back in the National Football League (NFL). He signed as an undrafted free agent with the Carolina Panthers in 2014. He played college football for the UAB Blazers. He also played for the Kansas City Chiefs.

== Early life ==
Darrin Reaves was born on April 17, 1993, in Birmingham, Alabama. Darrin grew up playing for the Wahouma Seminoles in the metro Birmingham area. He went on to star at Clay Chalkville Middle and High School. His best year (2010) was his senior year. He led his 9–4 Cougars to the quarterfinals in the 6A State Playoffs, losing to eventual champion Hoover 35–27. Reaves signed with UAB on signing day 2011.

== College career ==
Reaves attended the University of Alabama at Birmingham from 2011 to 2013. During his career he rushed for 2,343 yards on 496 carries with 27 touchdowns. After his junior season he entered the 2014 NFL draft.

== Professional career ==
=== Carolina Panthers ===
After going undrafted in the 2014 draft, Reaves signed with the Carolina Panthers. He was waived for final roster cuts before the start of the 2014 season, but signed to the team's practice squad on August 31, 2014.

Reaves was released from the Panthers on July 28, 2015.

=== Kansas City Chiefs ===
Reaves signed with the Kansas City Chiefs on August 2, 2015. On September 5, 2015, he was cut by the Chiefs. The Chiefs signed him to their practice squad on October 13. On January 18, 2016, the Chiefs signed Reaves to a future/reserve contract.

On September 3, 2016, Reaves was released by the Chiefs and was signed to the practice squad the next day. He signed a reserve/future contract with the Chiefs on January 31, 2017.

On May 7, 2017, the Chiefs reached an injury settlement with Reaves and released him.
