= Darrell Hackney =

American gridiron football player (born 1983)

No. 4
- Position: Quarterback

Personal information
- Born: August 7, 1983 (age 43); Atlanta, Georgia, U.S.
- Listed height: 6 ft 0 in (1.83 m)
- Listed weight: 248 lb (112 kg)

Career information
- High school: Frederick Douglass (Atlanta)
- College: UAB
- NFL draft: 2006: undrafted

Career history
- Cleveland Browns (2006)*; Denver Broncos (2007–2008); Winnipeg Blue Bombers (2009)*; Florida Tuskers (2009)*
- * Offseason or practice squad member only

Awards and highlights
- Conference USA All-Freshman (2002); SN Conference USA Freshman of the Year (2002); Third-team All-Conference USA (2004)

Darrell Hackney (born August 7, 1983) is an American former professional football player who was a quarterback in the National Football League (NFL). He played college football for the UAB Blazers. He was signed by the Cleveland Browns as an undrafted free agent in 2006.

Hackney was also a member of the Denver Broncos, Winnipeg Blue Bombers and Florida Tuskers.

== Early life ==
Hackney attended Douglass High School in Atlanta, Georgia and was a student and a letterman in football and baseball. In football, the Atlanta Journal-Constitution twice named him as an All-State Honorable Mention selection, and as a senior, he was also named the Atlanta Quarterback of the Year and his team's Most Valuable Player. Hackney graduated from Douglass High School in the year 2001.

== College career ==
Attending college at the University of Alabama at Birmingham (UAB), he was redshirted in 2001 as a true freshman. Hackney currently holds several of the career UAB passing records, including passing yards (9,886 yards), touchdowns (71 touchdowns), completions (694 completions) and most total offense per game (243.4 yards per game). He also holds several single-season records for the Blazers.

== Professional career ==
=== Cleveland Browns ===
Hackney was not drafted and was subsequently signed as a free agent with the Cleveland Browns. The Browns cut him on September 2, 2006.

=== Denver Broncos ===
On January 2, 2007, he signed with the Denver Broncos. Hackney spent the training camp with the Broncos where he competed with Preston Parsons, and Patrick Ramsey for the backup quarterback position.

On August 31, 2008, Hackney was signed to the Broncos practice squad. He was promoted to the active roster on November 1 after quarterback Patrick Ramsey was placed on injured reserve.

Three days after the Broncos traded for quarterback Kyle Orton, Hackney was waived on April 6, 2009.

=== Winnipeg Blue Bombers ===
Hackney was signed by the Winnipeg Blue Bombers on May 28, 2009. He was released on June 8, 2009.

=== Florida Tuskers ===
Hackney was signed by the Florida Tuskers of the United Football League, but was released prior to the 2009 season on September 26.
