= 2010 UAB Blazers football team =

American college football season

2010 UAB Blazers football
- Conference: Conference USA
- East Division
- Record: 4–8 (3–5 C-USA)
- Head coach: Neil Callaway (4th season)
- Offensive coordinator: Kim Helton (4th season)
- Offensive scheme: Pro spread
- Defensive coordinator: Eric Schumann (4th season)
- Base defense: 4–3
- Home stadium: Legion Field

2010 Conference USA football standings
	Conf.			Overall
Team	W		L	W		L
East Division
No. 21 UCF x$	7	–	1	11	–	3
East Carolina	5	–	3	6	–	7
Southern Miss	5	–	3	8	–	5
Marshall	4	–	4	5	–	7
UAB	3	–	5	4	–	8
Memphis	0	–	8	1	–	11
West Division
SMU xy	6	–	2	7	–	7
No. 24 Tulsa x	6	–	2	10	–	3
Houston	4	–	4	5	–	7
UTEP	3	–	5	6	–	7
Rice	3	–	5	4	–	8
Tulane	2	–	6	4	–	8
Championship: UCF 17, SMU 7
$ – Conference champion; x – Division champion/co-champions; y – Championship game participant; As of January 11, 2011; Rankings from AP Poll

The 2010 UAB Blazers football team represented the University of Alabama at Birmingham (UAB) as a member of the East Division in Conference USA (C-USA) during the 2010 NCAA Division I FBS football season. Led by fourth-year head coach Neil Callaway, the Blazers compiled an overall record of 4–8 with a mark of 3–5 in conference play, placing fifth in C-USA's East Division. The team played home games at Legion Field in Birmingham, Alabama.

== Schedule ==
Date	Time	Opponent	Site	TV	Result	Attendance	Source
September 2	7:00 p.m.	Florida Atlantic*	Legion Field; Birmingham, AL		L 31–32	25,885	
September 11	7:00 p.m.	at SMU	Gerald J. Ford Stadium; Dallas, TX		L 7–28	16,612	
September 18	3:00 p.m.	Troy*	Legion Field; Birmingham, AL		W 34–33	23,681	
September 25	11:21 a.m.	at Tennessee*	Neyland Stadium; Knoxville, TN	SECN	L 29–32 ^{2OT}	95,183	
October 6	7:00 p.m.	at UCF	Bright House Networks Stadium; Orlando, FL	ESPN	L 7–42	40,281	
October 16	3:00 p.m.	UTEP	Legion Field; Birmingham, AL		W 21–6	11,756	
October 23	6:00 p.m.	at No. 24 Mississippi State*	Davis Wade Stadium; Starkville, MS	ESPNU	L 24–29	56,423	
October 30	11:00 a.m.	at Southern Miss	M. M. Roberts Stadium; Hattiesburg, MS	CSS	W 50–49 ^{2OT}	26,415	
November 6	3:15 p.m.	Marshall^{†}	Legion Field; Birmingham, AL	CSS	L 17–31	17,860	
November 11	7:00 p.m.	East Carolina	Legion Field; Birmingham, AL	CBSCS	L 42–54	14,083	
November 20	7:00 p.m.	Memphis	Legion Field; Birmingham, AL (Battle for the Bones)		W 31–15	16,177	
November 27	2:30 p.m.	at Rice	Rice Stadium; Houston, TX		L 23–28	13,007	
*Non-conference game; ^{†}Homecoming; Rankings from AP Poll released prior to the game; All times are in Central time
