= Tejhaun Palmer =

American football player (born 2000)

No. 31 – Los Angeles Chargers
- Position: Wide receiver
- Roster status: Practice squad

Personal information
- Born: May 19, 2000 (age 26); Milwaukee, Wisconsin, U.S.
- Listed height: 6 ft 2 in (1.88 m)
- Listed weight: 210 lb (95 kg)

Career information
- High school: Brown Deer (Brown Deer, Wisconsin)
- College: Snow (2018–2020); UAB (2021–2023)
- NFL draft: 2024: 6th round, 191st overall pick

Career history
- Arizona Cardinals (2024–2025); New England Patriots (2026)*; Los Angeles Chargers (2026–present)*
- * Offseason or practice squad member only

Awards and highlights
- Third-team All-AAC (2023)

Career NFL statistics as of 2025
- Games played: 1
- Stats at Pro Football Reference

Tejhaun Palmer (born May 19, 2000) is an American professional football wide receiver for the Los Angeles Chargers of the National Football League (NFL). He played college football for the Snow Badgers and UAB Blazers, and was selected by the Arizona Cardinals in the sixth round of the 2024 NFL draft.

== Early life ==
Palmer grew up in Milwaukee, Wisconsin and attended Brown Deer High School. Palmer committed to play college football at Snow College.

== College career ==
=== Snow ===
Palmer caught 32 passes for 697 yards and 11 touchdowns during his time at Snow.

=== UAB ===
In 2021, Palmer caught six passes for 72 yards. He finished 2022 with 30 receptions for 479 yards and two scores. After the 2023 season, Palmer participated in the East–West Shrine Bowl.

=== College Stats ===
Palmer played in 37 games throughout his college career. He had 83 receptions for 1,409 yards and 9 touchdowns. He averaged 17.0 yards per reception and 38.1 yards per game.

== Professional career ==
Pre-draft measurables
| Height | Weight | Arm length | Hand span | Wingspan | 40-yard dash | 10-yard split | 20-yard split | Vertical jump | Broad jump | Bench press |
|---|---|---|---|---|---|---|---|---|---|---|
| 6 ft 1 3/4 in (1.87 m) | 210 lb (95 kg) | 33 3/4 in (0.86 m) | 9 7/8 in (0.25 m) | 6 ft 6 1/4 in (1.99 m) | 4.45 s | 1.54 s | 2.59 s | 35 in (0.89 m) | 10 ft 2 in (3.10 m) | 19 reps |
All values from Pro Day

=== Arizona Cardinals ===
Palmer was selected 191st overall by the Arizona Cardinals in the sixth round of the 2024 NFL draft. On August 28, 2024, he was waived as part of final roster cuts and re-signed to the practice squad. Palmer signed a reserve/future contract with Arizona on January 6, 2025.

On August 26, 2025, Palmer was waived by the Cardinals as part of final roster cuts; he was re-signed to the practice squad the next day. He was promoted to the active roster on January 3, 2026. Palmer was waived by Arizona on August 3.

=== New England Patriots ===
On August 4, 2026, Palmer was claimed off waivers by the New England Patriots. On August 30, Palmer was released by the Patriots as a part of final roster cuts.

=== Los Angeles Chargers ===
On October 27, 2026, Palmer signed with the Los Angeles Chargers practice squad.
