= Dylan Hopkins (American football) =

American football player (born 1999)

No. 10
- Position: Quarterback

Personal information
- Born: October 16, 1999 (age 27)
- Listed height: 6 ft 2 in (1.88 m)
- Listed weight: 225 lb (102 kg)

Career information
- High school: Maryville (Maryville, Tennessee)
- College: UAB (2018–2022); New Mexico (2023)
- Stats at ESPN

Dylan Hopkins (born October 16, 1999) is an American former football quarterback who played for the UAB Blazers and the New Mexico Lobos.

== Early life ==
Hopkins grew up in Lewisburg, West Virginia, along with Maryville, Tennessee, and attended and played high school football at Maryville High School. He helped the team win a state title in 2017 and was the runner-up for Mr. Football in Tennessee. He was rated a three-star recruit and committed to play college football at UAB over offers from Appalachian State, Austin Peay, Charlotte, East Tennessee State, Eastern Kentucky, Furman, Georgia State, Mercer, Southern Miss, Temple, Tulane and Western Carolina.

== College career ==
=== UAB ===
Hopkins received a redshirt during his true freshman season in 2018. During the 2019 season, he appeared in 10 games and finished the season with 563 passing yards and three touchdowns along with 217 rushing yards. Hopkins did not play during the 2020 season. During the 2021 season, he appeared in all 13 games and started 10 of them. He finished the season having thrown for 2,274 yards and 18 touchdowns along with 19 rushing yards and 5 rushing touchdowns. During the 2022 season, Hopkins started in 11 games but missed two and a half of them due to an injury. He finished the season having thrown for 1,913 yards, 10 touchdowns and four interceptions while completing 136 out of 215 passing attempts. On January 12, 2023, Hopkins announced that he would be entering the NCAA transfer portal.

=== New Mexico ===
Hopkins transferred to play for the New Mexico Lobos and was named their starting quarterback. He was named the MW Offensive Player of the Week for Week 2 after throwing 4 touchdown passes and completing 13 out of 17 passing attempts for 273 yards in a win against Tennessee Tech. In the 2023 season, he passed for 2,074 yards, 11 touchdowns, and nine interceptions to go with a rushing touchdown.
