= Alabama Mr. Basketball =

Award for high school boys

Each year the Alabama Mr. Basketball award is given to the person chosen as the best high school boys basketball player in the U.S. state of Alabama. The award winner is selected by members of the Alabama Sports Writers Association.

== Award winners ==
Year	Player	High School	College	NBA draft
2026	Jaylen Alexander	Oxford	Kansas State	
2025	DeWayne Brown	Hoover	Tennessee	
2024	Caleb Holt	Buckhorn, New Market	Arizona	
2023	Labaron Philon Jr.	Baker, Mobile	Alabama	2026 NBA draft: 1st Rnd, 22nd overall by the Philadelphia 76ers
2022	Barry Dunning Jr.	McGill-Toolen Catholic High School, Mobile	Arkansas/UAB	
2021	JD Davison (2)	Calhoun High School, Letohatchee	Alabama	2022 NBA draft: 2nd Rnd, 53rd overall by the Boston Celtics
2020	JD Davison	Calhoun High School, Letohatchee	Alabama	2022 NBA draft: 2nd Rnd, 53rd overall by the Boston Celtics
2019	Trendon Watford (2)	Mountain Brook, Mountain Brook	LSU	
2018	Trendon Watford	Mountain Brook, Mountain Brook	LSU	
2017	John Petty (2)	Jemison, Huntsville	Alabama	
2016	John Petty	J.O. Johnson High School, Huntsville	Alabama	
2015	Dazon Ingram	Theodore High School, Theodore	Alabama/UCF	
2014	William Lee	Dallas County High School, Plantersville	UAB	
2013	De'Runnya Wilson	Wenonah High School, Birmingham	Mississippi State	
2012	Craig Sword	Carver High School, Montgomery	Mississippi State	
2011	Trevor Lacey (2)	S. R. Butler High School, Huntsville	Alabama/NC State	
2010	Trevor Lacey	S. R. Butler High School, Huntsville	Alabama/NC State	
2009	Kerron Johnson	Madison Academy, Madison	Belmont	
2008	JaMychal Green	St. Jude Academy, Montgomery	Alabama	
2007	Courtney Fortson	Jefferson Davis High School, Montgomery	Arkansas	
2006	Stanley Robinson	Huffman High School, Birmingham	Connecticut	2010 NBA draft : 2nd Rnd, 59th overall by the Orlando Magic
2005	Richard Hendrix	Athens High School, Athens	Alabama	2008 NBA draft: 2nd Rnd, 49th overall by the Golden State Warriors
2004	Ronald Steele (2)	John Carroll Catholic High School, Birmingham	Alabama	
2003	Ronald Steele	John Carroll Catholic High School, Birmingham	Alabama	
2002	Kennedy Winston	Mattie T. Blount High School, Prichard	Alabama	
2001	Chris White	Virgil I. Grissom High School, Huntsville		
2000	Gerald Wallace	Childersburg High School, Childersburg	Alabama	2001 NBA draft: 1st Rnd, 25th overall by the Sacramento Kings
1999	Marvin Stone	Virgil I. Grissom High School, Huntsville	Kentucky/Louisville	
1998	Sam Haginas	UMS-Wright Preparatory School, Mobile	Alabama	
1997	Anthony Williams	Loachapoka High School, Loachapoka	Vanderbilt	
1996	Isaac Spencer	Jefferson Davis High School, Montgomery	Murray State	
1995	Brian Williams	Jefferson Davis High School, Montgomery	Alabama	
1994	Rod Willie	Lee High School, Huntsville	Georgia Southern	
1993	Howard Pride	S. R. Butler High School, Huntsville	Vanderbilt	
1992	Darryl Wilson	South Lamar School, Millport	Mississippi State	
1991	Victor Newman	Houston Academy, Dothan	NC State	
1990	Cedric Moore	Woodlawn High School, Birmingham	Alabama	
1989	Queintonia Higgins	Fairhope High School, Fairhope	Wyoming	
1988	Terrence Lewis	Ramsay High School, Birmingham	Providence	
1987	Bryant Lancaster	Valley High School, Valley	Alabama	
1986	Larry Rembert	Keith Middle-High School, Orrville	UAB	
1985	Vincent Robinson	Bridgeport High School, Bridgeport	Memphis State/Chattanooga	
1984	Steven Seay	Enterprise High School, Enterprise	San Francisco	1989 NBA draft: 3rd Rnd, 58th overall by the Utah Jazz
1983	Terry Coner	Phillips High School, Birmingham	Alabama	1987 NBA draft: 2nd Rnd, 44th overall by the Atlanta Hawks
1982	Buck Johnson	Hayes, Birmingham	Alabama	1986 NBA draft: 1st Rnd, 20th overall by the Houston Rockets
1981	Ennis Whatley	Phillips High School, Birmingham	Alabama	1983 NBA draft: 1st Rnd, 13th overall by the Kansas City Kings
1980				
1979	Mike Davis	Fayette County, Fayette	Alabama	1983 NBA draft: 2nd Rnd, 42nd overall by the Milwaukee Bucks
1978	Eddie Phillips	A. H. Parker, Birmingham	Alabama	1982 NBA draft: 1st Rnd, 21st overall by the New Jersey Nets
1975	Reggie King	Jackson-Olin, Birmingham	Alabama	1979 NBA draft: 1st Rnd, 18th overall by the Kansas City Kings

=== Schools with multiple winners ===
School	Number of Awards	Years
S. R. Butler High School, Huntsville	3	2011, 2010, 1993
Jefferson Davis High School	3	2007, 1996, 1995
Calhoun High School	2	2020, 2021
Mountain Brook	2	2018, 2019
John Carroll Catholic High School	2	2004, 2003
Virgil I. Grissom High School	2	2001, 1999
Phillips High School	2	1981, 1983

=== Most Winners By College ===
Number	Program
19	Alabama
3	Mississippi State
3	UAB
2	NC State
2	Vanderbilt
2	Arkansas

== See also ==
- Alabama Miss Basketball
