= John Petty Jr. =

American basketball player (born 1998)

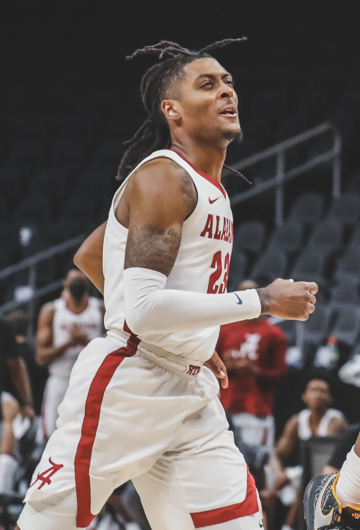
- Petty with the Alabama Crimson Tide in 2020

Free agent
- Position: Shooting guard

Personal information
- Born: December 2, 1998 (age 27) Huntsville, Alabama, U.S
- Listed height: 6 ft 5 in (1.96 m)
- Listed weight: 184 lb (83 kg)

Career information
- High school: J.O. Johnson (Huntsville, Alabama); Jemison (Huntsville, Alabama)
- College: Alabama (2017–2021)
- NBA draft: 2021: undrafted
- Playing career: 2021–present

Career history
- 2021–2023: Birmingham Squadron

Career highlights
- First-team All-SEC – Coaches (2021); Second-team All-SEC – AP (2021); Second-team All-SEC – Coaches (2020); 2× Alabama Mr. Basketball (2016, 2017)
- Stats at NBA.com
- Stats at Basketball Reference

John Petty Jr. (born December 2, 1998) is an American professional basketball player. He played college basketball for the Alabama Crimson Tide.

== High school career ==
As a freshman at J.O. Johnson High School in Huntsville, Alabama, Petty led his team to the state championship game and earned first-team Class 4A All-State honors. In his sophomore season, he won the Class 5A state title and was named tournament most valuable player (MVP). He was named Class 5A player of the year and finished third in Alabama Mr. Basketball voting. As a junior, Petty averaged 19.9 points, 7.1 rebounds and 4.1 assists per game, shooting 51 percent from the field and leading J.O. Johnson to its second straight Class 5A state championship. He repeated as tournament MVP after scoring 34 points in the title game and was recognized as Alabama Mr. Basketball and Alabama Gatorade Player of the Year.

For his senior season, Petty moved to Jemison High School after the closure of J.O Johnson. He averaged 20.7 points, 7.7 rebounds and 5.6 assists per game, won his third consecutive Class 5A state title and became the third player to win Alabama Mr. Basketball twice. He was selected to play at the Jordan Brand Classic.

=== Recruiting ===
A five-star recruit by ESPN and Rivals the top player from Alabama in the 2017 class, Petty committed to play college basketball for Alabama over Kentucky.

College recruiting information
| Name | Hometown | School | Height | Weight | Commit date |
|---|---|---|---|---|---|
| John Petty Jr. SG | Huntsville, AL | Jemison (AL) | 6 ft 5 in (1.96 m) | 185 lb (84 kg) | Nov 10, 2016 |
| John Petty Jr. SG | Recruit ratings: Scout: Rivals: 247Sports: ESPN: (93) | | | | |
Overall recruit ranking: Scout: 46 Rivals: 28 247Sports: 34 ESPN: 22
Note: In many cases, Scout, Rivals, 247Sports, On3, and ESPN may conflict in their listings of height and weight.; In these cases, the average was taken. ESPN grades are on a 100-point scale.; Sources: "Alabama 2017 Basketball Commitments". Rivals.; "2017 Alabama Crimson Tide Recruiting Class". ESPN.; "2017 Team Ranking". Rivals.

== College career ==
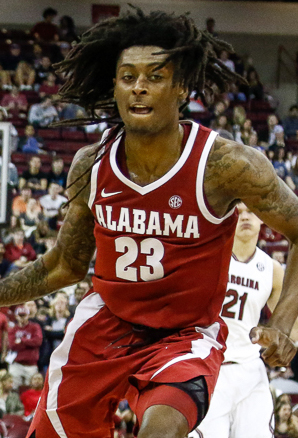
Petty in 2019

On November 17, 2017, in his third collegiate game, Petty scored a season-high 30 points and made a school-record 10 three-pointers in a 104–67 win over Alabama A&M. It was the most efficient three-point shooting performance by a player who recorded at least 10 three-pointers in Southeastern Conference (SEC) history. Petty was subsequently named SEC Freshman of the Week. He won the award again on January 1, 2018, two days after posting 18 points, four rebounds and three assists in a 79–57 victory over fifth-ranked Texas A&M. As a freshman, Petty averaged 10.2 points, 2.6 rebounds and 1.8 assists per game for the Crimson Tide.

On January 19, 2019, in his sophomore season, Petty matched his career high of 30 points in a 71–68 loss to third-ranked Tennessee. As a sophomore, he averaged 10.2 points, 4.2 rebounds and 1.9 assists per game. After the season, he entered the National Collegiate Athletic Association (NCAA) transfer portal. After having a meeting with new coach Nate Oats, Petty removed his name from the transfer portal on April 2.

On November 28, 2019, Petty recorded a then-career-high 34 points and 12 rebounds, his first career double-double, in a 104–89 loss to Iowa State at the Battle 4 Atlantis. He established a new career high on December 18, scoring 39 points in a 105–87 win over Samford. He had 10 three-pointers in the game, tying his own school record. Five days later, Petty shared SEC Player of the Week honors with Jair Bolden of South Carolina. At the conclusion of the regular season, Petty was named to the Second Team All-SEC. As a junior, Petty averaged 14.5 points, 6.6 rebounds, and 2.5 assists per game. After the season, Petty declared for the 2020 NBA draft. However, on August 3, he announced he was withdrawing from the draft and returning to Alabama.

On January 16, 2021, Petty became the all-time three-point scoring leader for Alabama in a 90–59 win against Arkansas, finishing with 17 points. As a senior, he averaged 12.6 points, 5.2 rebounds, and 1.9 assists per game, and hit an SEC-leading 77 three-pointers. Petty was named to the First Team All-SEC.

== Professional career ==
After going undrafted in the 2021 NBA draft, Petty signed with the New Orleans Pelicans on October 14, 2021. However, he was waived two days later. On October 25, he signed with the Birmingham Squadron as an affiliate player. Petty spent two seasons with the Squadron and averaged 7.3 points, 3.4 rebounds and 1.8 assists in 89 games. On September 8, 2023, he was traded to the Greensboro Swarm.

== Career statistics ==
Legend
| GP | Games played | GS | Games started | MPG | Minutes per game |
| FG% | Field goal percentage | 3P% | 3-point field goal percentage | FT% | Free throw percentage |
| RPG | Rebounds per game | APG | Assists per game | SPG | Steals per game |
| BPG | Blocks per game | PPG | Points per game | **Bold** | Career high |

=== College ===
| Year | Team | GP | GS | MPG | FG% | 3P% | FT% | RPG | APG | SPG | BPG | PPG |
|---|---|---|---|---|---|---|---|---|---|---|---|---|
| 2017–18 | Alabama | **36** | 29 | 28.5 | .393 | .372 | .711 | 2.6 | 1.8 | .5 | .3 | 10.2 |
| 2018–19 | Alabama | 34 | 17 | 28.5 | .413 | .345 | .707 | 4.2 | 1.9 | .5 | .4 | 10.2 |
| 2019–20 | Alabama | 29 | 28 | **33.5** | **.462** | **.440** | .674 | **6.6** | **2.5** | 1.1 | **.7** | **14.5** |
| 2020–21 | Alabama | 32 | **31** | 31.3 | .420 | .370 | **.734** | 5.2 | 1.9 | **1.3** | .6 | 12.6 |
| Career | | 131 | 105 | 30.3 | .422 | .382 | .704 | 4.5 | 2.0 | .8 | .5 | 11.7 |

== Personal life ==
Petty's father, John Sr., played basketball as a shooting guard for Buckhorn High School in New Market, Alabama. Petty's mother is Regina and he has two sisters. He has a daughter, Aubrielle Nicole Petty, who was born during his freshman season in college. The mother of Aubrielle is Tamarra Fletcher, who also played basketball at Jemison High.

On February 18, 2024, Petty was charged with eluding police in addition to driving under the influence (DUI).
