= Ruffin McNeill =

American football player and coach (born 1958)

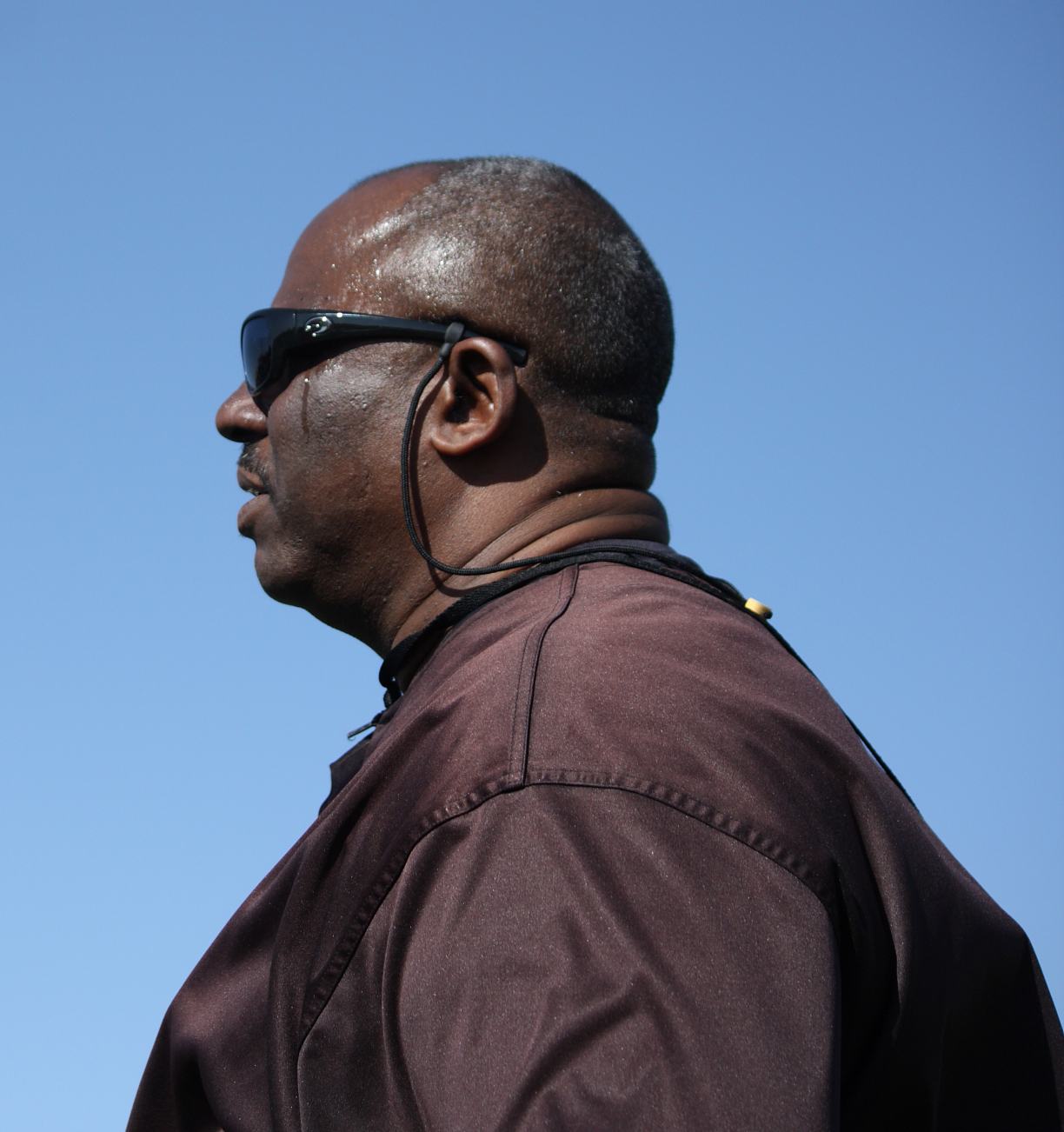

Current position
- Title: Special assistant to the head coach
- Team: NC State
- Conference: ACC

Biographical details
- Born: October 9, 1958 (age 68)

Playing career
- 1976–1980: East Carolina
- Position: Defensive back

Coaching career (HC unless noted)
- 1980–1984: Lumberton HS (NC) (assistant)
- 1985–1986: Clemson (GA/LB)
- 1987: Austin Peay (LB)
- 1988: North Alabama (LB)
- 1989–1991: Appalachian State (LB)
- 1992: East Carolina (DL)
- 1993–1996: Appalachian State (DC)
- 1997: UNLV (DC)
- 1998: UNLV (AHC/DC)
- 1999: Fresno State (DC)
- 2000–2002: Texas Tech (LB)
- 2003–2006: Texas Tech (AHC/ST)
- 2007: Texas Tech (AHC/DL)
- 2008–2009: Texas Tech (AHC/DC)
- 2010–2015: East Carolina
- 2016: Virginia (AHC/DL)
- 2017: Oklahoma (AHC/DT)
- 2018: Oklahoma (AHC/DT/Interim DC)
- 2019: Oklahoma (AHC/OLB)
- 2020–present: NC State (special assistant)

Head coaching record
- Overall: 43–34
- Bowls: 2–3

Ruffin Horne McNeill Jr. (born October 8, 1958) is an American football coach and former player who currently serves as the special assistant to the head coach at NC State University. He previously served as the assistant head coach and outside linebackers coach at the University of Oklahoma and the assistant head coach and defensive line coach at the University of Virginia. McNeill also served as the head coach of the East Carolina Pirates from 2010 to 2015. Before being named head coach of the Pirates, McNeill served the Texas Tech Red Raiders as an interim head coach, assistant head coach, special teams coordinator, and linebackers coach. On December 28, 2009, he was named interim head coach of the Red Raiders following the suspension and later firing of head coach Mike Leach. He served in the position until the hiring of Tommy Tuberville, who subsequently released him as defensive coordinator.

== Playing career ==
McNeill was a defensive back for the East Carolina Pirates for four years under then head coach Pat Dye. For three of his years at ECU he was a starter, and for two he served as team captain. In his first year with the Pirates, McNeill helped East Carolina to the 1976 Southern Conference Championship and a berth to the Independence Bowl two years later.

McNeill graduated from East Carolina University in 1980. He later went on to Clemson where he earned a master's degree in counseling.

== Coaching career ==
In addition to coaching at the high school level and spending a summer as an intern with the Miami Dolphins under Jimmy Johnson, McNeill has coached 23 seasons at the college level, including seven seasons at Appalachian State, his first job as defensive coordinator. In total, he has been on the coaching staffs at Clemson, Austin Peay State, North Alabama, Appalachian State, UNLV, Fresno State, and Texas Tech.

=== Texas Tech ===
McNeill began his tenure at Texas Tech in 2000 as a linebackers coach. In 2003, he accepted the role of assistant head coach as well as taking duties of linebackers coach. In 2007, then-defensive coordinator Lyle Setencich stepped down due to "personal reasons" after a 49–45 loss to Oklahoma State in which the Texas Tech defense allowed over 600 yards of total offense and three 100 yard rushers. Head coach Mike Leach named McNeill interim defensive coordinator shortly after with eight games remaining in the season.

On December 28, 2009, Leach was suspended, and fired two days later, by Texas Tech University over the alleged inappropriate treatment of an injured player. McNeill was named interim head coach and led the team to a 41–31 victory over the Michigan State Spartans in the 2010 Alamo Bowl before being replaced as head coach by Tommy Tuberville. On January 13, 2010, McNeill was removed from the Texas Tech coaching staff by Tuberville and replaced with James Willis.

==== Defensive improvements ====
With McNeill at the defensive helm, the Red Raiders' defense improved in every defensive category. Under Setencich, Tech ranked seventh in pass defense, ninth in total defense, and tenth in scoring defense in Big 12 Conference play. In nine games with McNeill, Tech improved to first in pass and total defense and fourth in scoring defense. The Red Raiders forced more punts and allowed fewer rushing and passing yards than they did to begin the season. These vast improvements in the defense led Leach to drop the interim tag and make McNeill the full-time defensive coordinator.

=== East Carolina ===
On January 21, 2010, it was announced that Ruffin McNeill would be named head football coach at his alma mater, East Carolina, replacing Skip Holtz, who had recently left for the head coaching job at the University of South Florida.

After seasons of 6-7 and 5-7, in 2012 East Carolina posted an 8-5 record which included an appearance in the New Orleans Bowl. In 2013, McNeill's Pirates posted the second-most wins in school history, going 10-3 including a win over Ohio University in the 2013 Beef 'O' Brady's Bowl. The season also included wins over in-state rivals North Carolina and North Carolina State. In 2014, however, most felt the Pirates underachieved, marking an 8-5 record and losing 4 out of their last 6 games.

On December 4, 2015, McNeill was relieved of his duties as head coach after finishing the season with a record of 5–7.

=== Oklahoma ===
McNeill was named the assistant head coach and defensive tackles coach at the University of Oklahoma on June 14, 2017. He was named interim defensive coordinator on October 8, 2018, replacing the fired Mike Stoops. With the hiring of Alex Grinch as the defensive coordinator in January 2019, McNeill was retained on the OU staff as assistant head coach and outside linebackers coach.

McNeill resigned from Oklahoma at the conclusion of the 2019 season.

=== NC State ===
McNeill was announced as the special assistant to head coach Dave Doeren at NC State on July 7, 2020.

== Personal ==
McNeill and his wife, Erlene, have two daughters, Olivia and Renata, one grandchild Isabella and a brother Reggie.

McNeill is a member of the Omega Psi Phi fraternity.

== Head coaching record ==
Year	Team	Overall	Conference	Standing	Bowl/playoffs	Coaches^{#}	AP^{°}
Texas Tech Red Raiders (Big 12 Conference) (2009)
2009	Texas Tech	1–0*	0–0		W Alamo	23	21
Texas Tech:		1–0		*Coached bowl game after Mike Leach was fired			
East Carolina (Conference USA) (2010–2014)
2010	East Carolina	6–7	5–3	T–2nd (East)	L Military		
2011	East Carolina	5–7	4–4	3rd (East)			
2012	East Carolina	8–5	7–1	T–1st (East)	L New Orleans		
2013	East Carolina	10–3	6–2	T–2nd (East)	W Beef 'O' Brady's		
East Carolina (American Athletic Conference) (2014–2015)
2014	East Carolina	8–5	5–3	T–4th	L Birmingham		
2015	East Carolina	5–7	3–5	5th (Eastern)			
East Carolina:		42–34	30–18				
Total:		43–34					
National championship Conference title Conference division title or championship game berth
^{#}Rankings from final Coaches Poll.; ^{°}Rankings from final AP Poll.
