= 2017–18 Alabama Crimson Tide men's basketball team =

American college basketball season

2017–18 Alabama Crimson Tide men's basketball

NCAA tournament, Second Round
- Conference: Southeastern Conference
- Record: 20–16 (8–10 SEC)
- Head coach: Avery Johnson (3rd season)
- Assistant coaches: John Pelphrey (2nd season); Antoine Pettway (6th season); Yasir Rosemond (1st season)
- Home arena: Coleman Coliseum (Capacity: 15,383)

2017–18 Southeastern Conference men's basketball standings
	Conf.				Overall
Team	W		L	PCT	W		L	PCT
No. 19 Auburn	13	–	5	.722	26	–	8	.765
No. 13 Tennessee	13	–	5	.722	26	–	9	.743
No. 23 Florida	11	–	7	.611	21	–	13	.618
No. 18 Kentucky †	10	–	8	.556	26	–	11	.703
Missouri	10	–	8	.556	20	–	13	.606
Arkansas	10	–	8	.556	23	–	12	.657
Mississippi State	9	–	9	.500	25	–	12	.676
Texas A&M	9	–	9	.500	22	–	13	.629
Alabama	8	–	10	.444	20	–	16	.556
LSU	8	–	10	.444	18	–	15	.545
Georgia	7	–	11	.389	18	–	15	.545
South Carolina	7	–	11	.389	17	–	16	.515
Vanderbilt	6	–	12	.333	12	–	20	.375
Ole Miss	5	–	13	.278	12	–	20	.375
† 2018 SEC tournament winner Rankings from AP poll

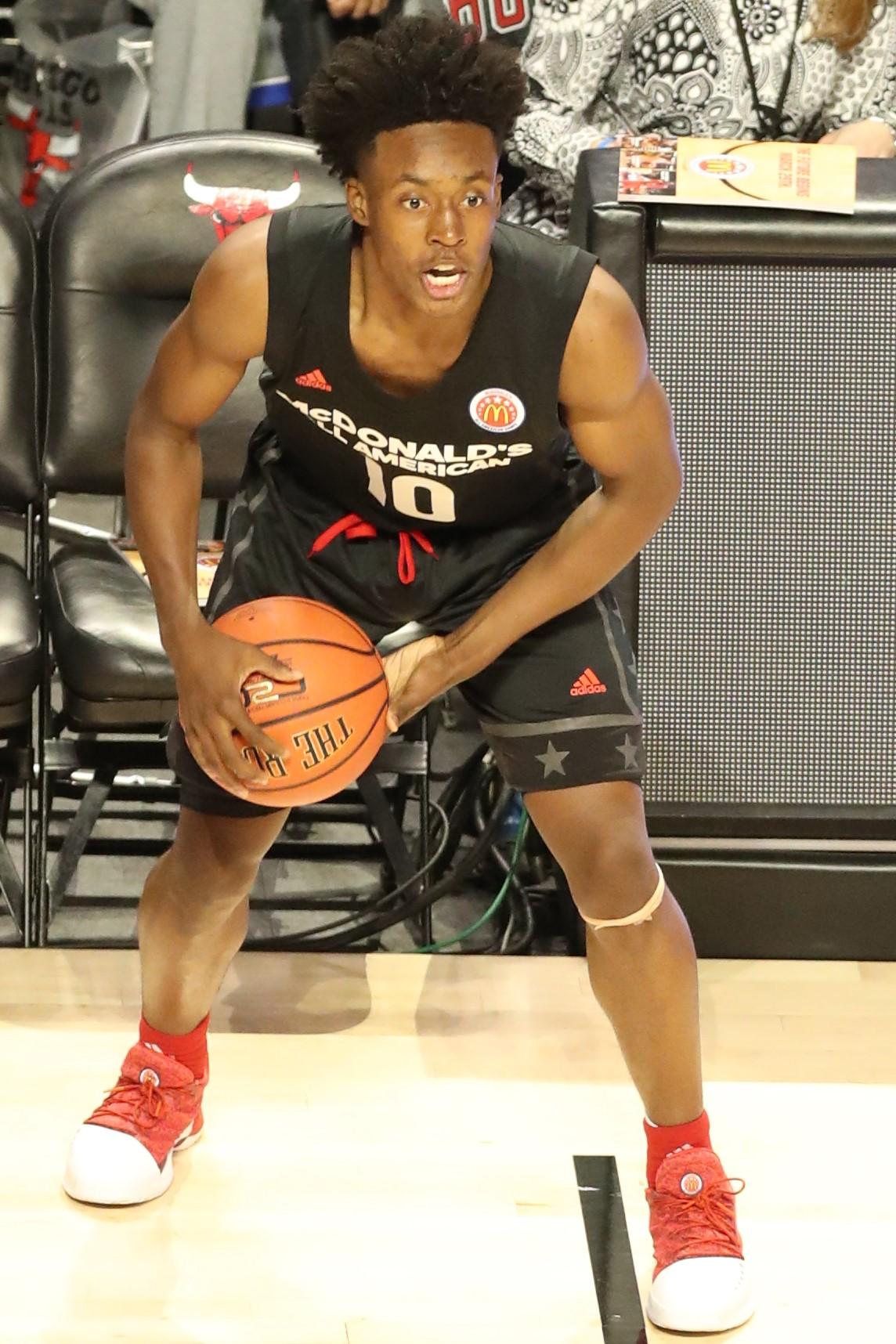
Alabama recruit Collin Sexton at the 2017 McDonald's All-American Boys Game.

The 2017–18 Alabama Crimson Tide men's basketball team (variously "Alabama", "UA", "Bama" or "The Tide") represented the University of Alabama in the 2017–18 NCAA Division I men's basketball season. The team was led by third-year head coach Avery Johnson and played its home games at Coleman Coliseum in Tuscaloosa, Alabama as a member of the Southeastern Conference. They finished the season 20–16, 8–10 in SEC play to finish in a tie for ninth place. They defeated Texas A&M and Auburn in the SEC tournament before losing in the semifinals to Kentucky. They received an at-large bid to the NCAA tournament where they defeated Virginia Tech in the First Round before losing in the Second Round to Villanova.

== Previous season ==
The Crimson Tide finished the 2016–17 season 19–15 overall and 8–10 in SEC play to finish in a tie for fifth place. They defeated Mississippi State and South Carolina to advance to the semifinals of the SEC tournament where they lost to Kentucky. They received an invitation to the National Invitation Tournament where they lost in the first round to Richmond.

== Off-season ==
=== Departures ===
Name	Pos.	Height	Weight	Year	Hometown	Reason for departure
Corban Collins	G	6'3"	190	RS Senior	High Point, NC	Graduated.
Bola Olaniyan	F	6'7"	235	RS Senior	Lagos, Nigeria	Graduated.
Shannon Hale	F	6'8"	233	Senior	Johnson City, TN	Graduated.
Jimmie Taylor	G	6'10"	248	Senior	Greensboro, AL	Graduated.
Nick King	G/F	6'7"	225	RS Junior	Memphis, TN	Transferred to Middle Tennessee.
Brandon Austin	G	6'5"	197	Sophomore	Montgomery, AL	Transferred to Samford.

=== 2017 recruiting class ===
College recruiting
Name	Hometown	School	Height	Weight	Commit date
Herbert Jones; SG	Moundville, AL	Hale County High School	6 ft 7 in (2.01 m)	183 lb (83 kg)	Oct 6, 2016
Herbert Jones; SG	Recruit ratings: Scout: Rivals: 247Sports: ESPN: (79)				
Alex Reese; PF	Pelham, AL	Pelham High School	6 ft 9 in (2.06 m)	225 lb (102 kg)	Oct 6, 2016
Alex Reese; PF	Recruit ratings: Scout: Rivals: 247Sports: ESPN: (82)				
Galin Smith; C	Clinton, MS	Clinton High School	6 ft 10 in (2.08 m)	220 lb (100 kg)	Oct 7, 2016
Galin Smith; C	Recruit ratings: Scout: Rivals: 247Sports: ESPN: (NR)				
John Petty Jr. SG	Huntsville, AL	Jemison High School	6 ft 5 in (1.96 m)	180 lb (82 kg)	Oct 10, 2016
John Petty Jr. SG	Recruit ratings: Scout: Rivals: 247Sports: ESPN: (93)				
Collin Sexton; PG	Mableton, GA	Pebblebrook High School	6 ft 2 in (1.88 m)	182 lb (83 kg)	Oct 10, 2016
Collin Sexton; PG	Recruit ratings: Scout: Rivals: 247Sports: ESPN: (95)				
Overall recruit ranking: Scout: 6 Rivals: 6 247Sports: 7 ESPN: 8
Note: In many cases, Scout, Rivals, 247Sports, On3, and ESPN may conflict in their listings of height and weight.; In these cases, the average was taken. ESPN grades are on a 100-point scale.; Sources: "Alabama 2017 Basketball Commitments". Rivals.; "2017 Alabama Basketball Commits". Scout.; "Alabama 2017 Basketball Commits". ESPN.; "Scout.com Team Recruiting Rankings". Scout.; "2016 Team Ranking". Rivals.; "Alabama 2017 Basketball Commits". 247Sports.

== Future recruits ==
=== 2018–19 team recruits ===
College recruiting (2018)
Name	Hometown	School	Height	Weight	Commit date
Javian Fleming; C	Canton, MS	Canton High School	6 ft 9 in (2.06 m)	230 lb (100 kg)	Nov 3, 2017
Javian Fleming; C	Recruit ratings: Scout: Rivals: 247Sports: ESPN: (82)				
Diante Wood; SG	Anniston, AL	Sacred Heart Catholic School	6 ft 4 in (1.93 m)	175 lb (79 kg)	Nov 8, 2017
Diante Wood; SG	Recruit ratings: Scout: Rivals: 247Sports: ESPN: (82)				
Overall recruit ranking:
Note: In many cases, Scout, Rivals, 247Sports, On3, and ESPN may conflict in their listings of height and weight.; In these cases, the average was taken. ESPN grades are on a 100-point scale.; Sources: "2018 Alabama Commits". Rivals.; "2018 Team Ranking". Rivals.

== Roster ==
2017–18 Alabama Crimson Tide men's basketball team
Players
Coaches

Pos.	#	Name	Height	Weight	Year	Previous school	Hometown
F/C	0	Donta Hall	6 ft 10 in (2.08 m)	232 lb (105 kg)	Jr	Luverne HS	Luverne, AL
G/F	1	Riley Norris (injured)	6 ft 7 in (2.01 m)	207 lb (94 kg)	Sr	Albertville HS	Albertville, AL
G	2	Collin Sexton	6 ft 3 in (1.91 m)	190 lb (86 kg)	Fr	Pebblebrook HS	Mableton, GA
F	3	Alex Reese	6 ft 9 in (2.06 m)	250 lb (113 kg)	Fr	Pelham HS	Pelham, AL
C	4	Daniel Giddens	6 ft 11 in (2.11 m)	245 lb (111 kg)	RS So	Ohio State	Mableton, GA
G	5	Avery Johnson Jr.	5 ft 11 in (1.8 m)	190 lb (86 kg)	RS Jr	Texas A&M	Houston, TX
G	10	Herbert Jones	6 ft 7 in (2.01 m)	198 lb (90 kg)	Fr	Hale County HS	Greensboro, AL
G/F	11	Tevin Mack (redshirt)	6 ft 7 in (2.01 m)	215 lb (98 kg)	Jr	Texas	Columbia, SC
G	12	Dazon Ingram	6 ft 5 in (1.96 m)	208 lb (94 kg)	RS So	Theodore HS	Theodore, AL
G	22	Ar'Mond Davis	6 ft 6 in (1.98 m)	193 lb (88 kg)	Sr	Southern Idaho	Tacoma, WA
G	23	John Petty Jr.	6 ft 5 in (1.96 m)	180 lb (82 kg)	Fr	Jemison HS	Huntsville, AL
G	24	Lawson Schaffer (W)	5 ft 11 in (1.8 m)	168 lb (76 kg)	Jr	Cullman HS	Cullman, AL
F	25	Braxton Key	6 ft 8 in (2.03 m)	225 lb (102 kg)	So	Oak Hill Academy	Decatur, GA
F	30	Galin Smith	6 ft 9 in (2.06 m)	233 lb (106 kg)	Fr	Clinton HS	Clinton, MS
F	33	Landon Fuller (W)	6 ft 8 in (2.03 m)	222 lb (101 kg)	So	Brentwood Academy	Brentwood, TN

Head coach

- Avery Johnson (Southern)

Assistant coach(es)

- John Pelphrey (Kentucky)
- Antoine Pettway (Alabama)
- Yasir Rosemond (Oregon)

Strength and conditioning coach(es)

- Lou DeNeen (South Florida)

Legend

- (C) Team captain
- (S) Suspended
- (I) Ineligible
- (W) Walk-on
- Injured
- Current redshirt

Roster
Last update: 2017-07-24

== Schedule and results ==
On November 25, 2017, Alabama participated in one of the strangest moments of NCAA basketball history. During their game against #14 ranked Minnesota Golden Gophers, Alabama's bench players left the bench area during a scuffle with Minnesota's players midway through the second half, which resulted in Alabama's entire bench being ejected. Not long after the ejections, Dazon Ingram fouled out with 11:37 left in the game, which resulted in Alabama playing the rest of the game in a 4 vs. 5 manner. Not long afterwards, John Petty turned his ankle and could not return for the rest of the game, thus leaving Alabama with only three players with 10:41 left in the contest. From that point on Alabama was forced to play with only senior shooting guard/small forward Riley Norris, freshman power forward Galin Smith, and star freshman point guard Collin Sexton in a 3-on-5 setting throughout the rest of the game. While Minnesota was up by as many as 15 points during the undermanned portion of the game, Alabama would fight to cut the deficit to as few as 3 points due to Collin Sexton's leadership, which included a 40 point game from him. However, the Golden Gophers would ultimately hold on to win 89–84 over the shorthanded Crimson Tide. Despite losing, Alabama would improve their rank to #24 due to their performance while undermanned and nearly upsetting Minnesota that night. The game would be described as one of the strangest in college basketball history.

Date time, TV	Rank^{#}	Opponent^{#}	Result	Record	High points	High rebounds	High assists	Site (attendance) city, state
Canadian Foreign Tour
Aug 7, 2017*; 6:00 pm		at McGill	W 96–57	–	22 – Petty	5 – Key, Petty	2 – Sexton	Love Competition Hall (350); Montréal, Québec
Aug 9, 2017*; 6:00 pm		at Carleton (ON)	L 71–84	–	16 – Petty	6 – Giddens, Hall	8 – Sexton	Ravens Nest Arena; Ottawa, Ontario
Aug 10, 2017*; 5:30 pm		at Ottawa (ON)	W 81–71	–	15 – Johnson	9 – Key	4 – Johnson, Petty	Montpetit Hall; Ottawa, Ontario
Exhibition
Nov 6, 2017*; 7:00 pm, SECN		Alabama–Huntsville	W 74–65	–	17 – Giddens	10 – Giddens	4 – Jones	Coleman Coliseum (11,317); Tuscaloosa, AL
Regular season
Nov 10, 2017*; 5:30 pm, CBSSN		vs. Memphis; Veterans Classic	W 82–70	1–0	20 – Ingram	11 – Hall	5 – Ingram	Alumni Hall (3,238); Annapolis, MD
Nov 14, 2017*; 7:00 pm, SECN		Lipscomb	W 86–64	2–0	22 – Sexton	9 – Reese	5 – Sexton	Coleman Coliseum (12,325); Tuscaloosa, AL
Nov 17, 2017*; 6:00 pm, SECN+		Alabama A&M; Barclays Center Classic campus site game	W 104–67	3–0	30 – Petty	8 – Jones, Reese	5 – Sexton, Johnson Jr.	Coleman Coliseum (11,948); Tuscaloosa, AL
Nov 21, 2017*; 8:00 pm, SECN	No. 25	Texas–Arlington; Barclays Center Classic campus site game	W 77–76	4–0	29 – Sexton	9 – Jones	4 – Sexton	Coleman Coliseum (11,737); Tuscaloosa, AL
Nov 24, 2017*; 1:30 pm, Stadium	No. 25	vs. BYU; Barclays Center Classic	W 71–59	5–0	16 – Petty	9 – Hall	3 – Ingram	Steinberg Center (1,240); Brooklyn, NY
Nov 25, 2017*; 4:00 pm, Stadium	No. 25	vs. No. 14 Minnesota; Barclays Center Classic	L 84–89	5–1	40 – Sexton	8 – Smith	5 – Sexton	Barclays Center (3,459); Brooklyn, NY
Nov 29, 2017*; 7:00 pm, SECN+	No. 24	Louisiana Tech	W 77–74	6–1	22 – Sexton, Ingram	9 – Ingram	4 – Petty	Coleman Coliseum (12,062); Tuscaloosa, AL
Dec 3, 2017*; 1:00 pm, ESPNU	No. 24	UCF	L 62–65	6–2	20 – Hall	7 – Ingram	4 – Ingram, Jones	Coleman Coliseum (13,534); Tuscaloosa, AL
Dec 6, 2017*; 7:00 pm, SECN+		Rhode Island	W 68–64	7–2	13 – Hall	14 – Hall	4 – Petty	Coleman Coliseum (12,807); Tuscaloosa, AL
Dec 9, 2017*; 9:00 pm, ESPN2		at Arizona	L 82–88	7–3	30 – Sexton	12 – Hall	6 – Ingram	McKale Center (14,644); Tucson, AZ
Dec 19, 2017*; 8:00 pm, SECN		vs. Mercer; Rocket City Classic	W 80–79	8–3	21 – Sexton	8 – Ingram	4 – Sexton	Von Braun Center (4,799); Huntsville, AL
Dec 22, 2017*; 8:00 pm, ESPN2		vs. Texas; Vulcan Classic	L 50–66	8–4	14 – Petty	8 – Ingram	4 – Sexton	Legacy Arena (16,146); Birmingham, AL
Dec 30, 2017; 5:00 pm, ESPN2		No. 5 Texas A&M	W 79–57	9–4 (1–0)	18 – Petty	9 – Jones	3 – Petty, Ingram	Coleman Coliseum (14,218); Tuscaloosa, AL
Jan 2, 2018; 6:00 pm, SECN		at Vanderbilt	L 75–76	9–5 (1–1)	24 – Sexton	6 – Hall	5 – Sexton	Memorial Gymnasium (9,519); Nashville, TN
Jan 6, 2018; 11:00 am, SECN		at Georgia	L 46–65	9–6 (1–2)	23 – Sexton	6 – Hall	3 – Sexton	Stegeman Coliseum (10,523); Athens, GA
Jan 9, 2018; 6:00 pm, SECN		South Carolina	W 76–62	10–6 (2–2)	15 – Petty	7 – Hall	5 – Key	Coleman Coliseum (10,909); Tuscaloosa, AL
Jan 13, 2018; 7:30 pm, SECN		at LSU	W 74–66	11–6 (3–2)	18 – Ingram	10 – Ingram	3 – Ingram, Sexton	Maravich Center (13,600); Baton Rouge, LA
Jan 17, 2018; 6:00 pm, SECN		No. 17 Auburn; Iron Bowl of Basketball	W 76–71	12–6 (4–2)	27 – Petty	9 – Key	4 – Jones	Coleman Coliseum (15,383); Tuscaloosa, AL
Jan 20, 2018; 7:30 pm, SECN		Mississippi State	W 68–62	13–6 (5–2)	16 – Key	8 – Ingram	6 – Ingram	Coleman Coliseum (15,383); Tuscaloosa, AL
Jan 23, 2018; 7:30 pm, SECN		at Ole Miss	L 66–78	13–7 (5–3)	14 – Hall	8 – Ingram	5 – Ingram	The Pavilion at Ole Miss (8,099); Oxford, MS
Jan 27, 2018*; 1:15 pm, ESPN		No. 12 Oklahoma; Big 12/SEC Challenge	W 80–73	14–7	18 – Sexton	9 – Giddens	3 – Jones, Ingram	Coleman Coliseum (15,383); Tuscaloosa, AL
Jan 31, 2018; 8:00 pm, ESPNU		Missouri	L 60–68	14–8 (5–4)	23 – Sexton	4 – Hall, Sexton	2 – Sexton	Coleman Coliseum (11,603); Tuscaloosa, AL
Feb 3, 2018; 3:00 pm, ESPN		at No. 23 Florida	W 68–50	15–8 (6–4)	17 – Sexton	11 – Hall	6 – Sexton	O'Connell Center (10,845); Gainesville, FL
Feb 6, 2018; 6:00 pm, SECN		at Mississippi State	L 63–67	15–9 (6–5)	18 – Sexton	6 – Hall, Key	3 – Sexton	Humphrey Coliseum (7,095); Starkville, MS
Feb 10, 2018; 5:00 pm, SECN		No. 15 Tennessee	W 78–50	16–9 (7–5)	17 – Hall	11 – Hall	4 – Sexton, Petty	Coleman Coliseum (15,383); Tuscaloosa, AL
Feb 13, 2018; 8:00 pm, SECN		LSU	W 80–65	17–9 (8–5)	20 – Hall	8 – Hall	6 – Sexton	Coleman Coliseum (11,154); Tuscaloosa, AL
Feb 17, 2018; 1:00 pm, CBS		at Kentucky	L 71–81	17–10 (8–6)	16 – Hall	6 – Hall	3 – Petty, Sexton	Rupp Arena (23,220); Lexington, KY
Feb 21, 2018; 7:30 pm, SECN		at No. 12 Auburn; Iron Bowl of Basketball	L 71–90	17–11 (8–7)	25 – Sexton	8 – Key	4 – Petty	Auburn Arena (9,121); Auburn, AL
Feb 24, 2018; 5:00 pm, SECN		Arkansas	L 73–76	17–12 (8–8)	16 – Key	8 – Hall	6 – Sexton	Coleman Coliseum (15,383); Tuscaloosa, AL
Feb 27, 2018; 6:00 pm, ESPN		Florida	L 52–73	17–13 (8–9)	14 – Sexton	8 – Key	3 – Schaffer, Sexton	Coleman Coliseum (12,282); Tuscaloosa, AL
Mar 3, 2018; 1:00 pm, ESPN2		at Texas A&M	L 66–68	17–14 (8–10)	23 – Sexton	8 – Petty	7 – Sexton	Reed Arena (10,755); College Station, TX
SEC Tournament
Mar 8, 2018; 12:00 pm, SECN	(9)	vs. (8) Texas A&M; Second Round	W 71–70	18–14	27 – Sexton	9 – Ingram	5 – Sexton	Scottrade Center (15,129); St. Louis, MO
Mar 9, 2018; 12:00 pm, ESPN	(9)	vs. (1) No. 16 Auburn; Quarterfinals	W 81–63	19–14	31 – Sexton	10 – Key	5 – Ingram	Scottrade Center (16,364); St. Louis, MO
Mar 10, 2018; 12:00 pm, ESPN	(9)	vs. (4) Kentucky; Semifinals	L 63–86	19–15	21 – Sexton	7 – Giddens	3 – Sexton	Scottrade Center (18,729); St. Louis, MO
NCAA Tournament
Mar 15, 2018*; 8:20 pm, TNT	(9 E)	vs. (8 E) Virginia Tech; First Round	W 86–83	20–15	25 – Sexton	7 – Ingram	6 – Sexton	PPG Paints Arena (18,715); Pittsburgh, PA
Mar 17, 2018*; 11:10 am, CBS	(9 E)	vs. (1 E) No. 2 Villanova; Second Round	L 58–81	20–16	17 – Sexton	7 – Ingram	3 – Sexton, Schaffer	PPG Paints Arena (19,015); Pittsburgh, PA
*Non-conference game. ^{#}Rankings from AP Poll. (#) Tournament seedings in parentheses. E=East. All times are in Central Time.

== Rankings ==
Ranking movements Legend: ██ Increase in ranking ██ Decrease in ranking — = Not ranked RV = Received votes
	Week																			
Poll	Pre	1	2	3	4	5	6	7	8	9	10	11	12	13	14	15	16	17	18	Final
AP	RV	RV	25	24	RV	RV	RV	—	—	—	—	—	RV	RV	RV	RV	—	—	N/A	Not released
Coaches	25	25^	RV	RV	RV	RV	RV	—	RV	—	—	RV	RV	RV	RV	—	—	—	N/A	

*AP does not release post-NCAA Tournament rankings
^Coaches did not release a Week 2 poll.

== See also ==
- 2017–18 Alabama Crimson Tide women's basketball team
