= Richard Hendrix =

American-Macedonian basketball player

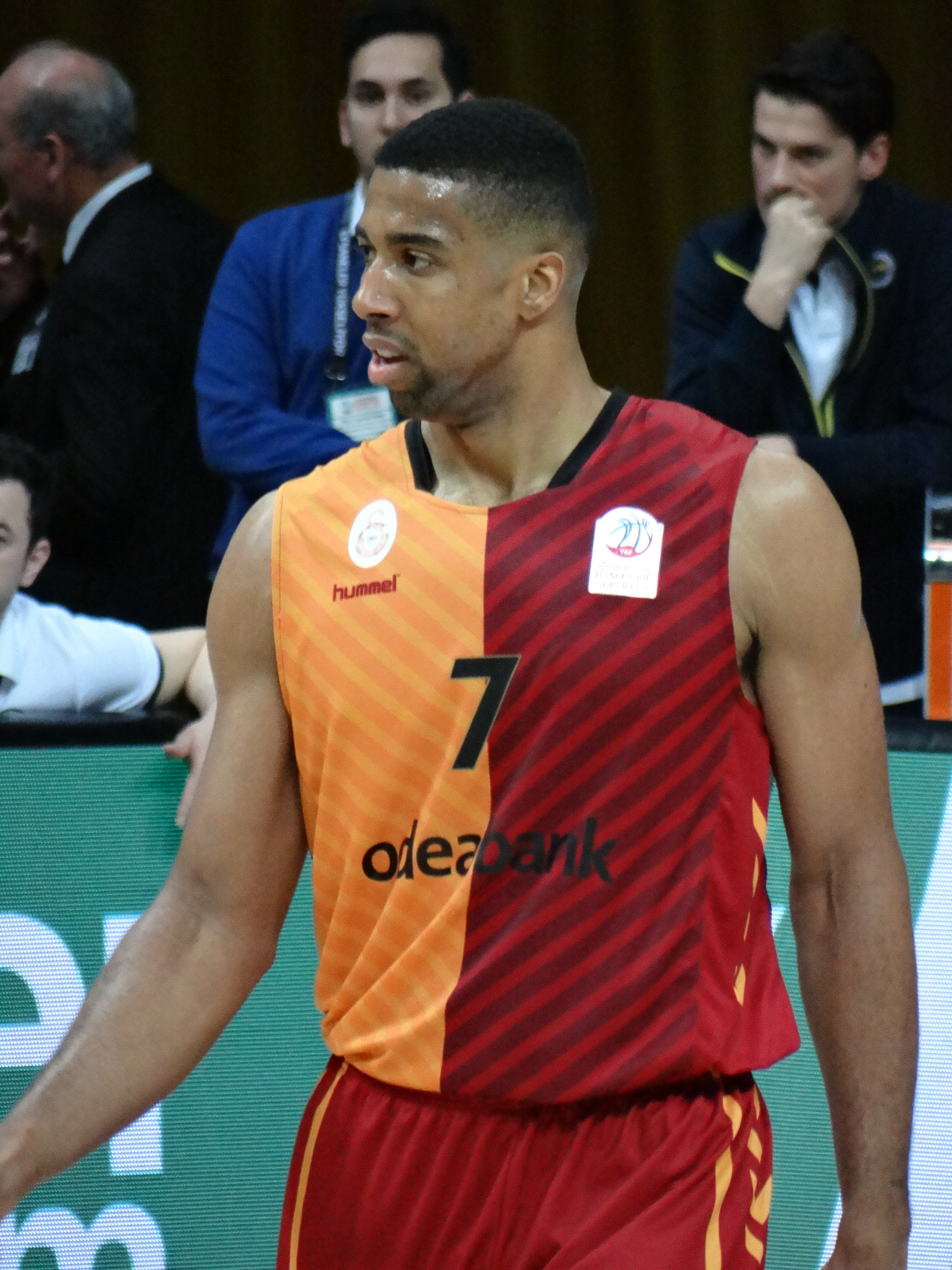
- Hendrix with Galatasaray in 2018

Personal information
- Born: November 15, 1986 (age 40) Decatur, Alabama, U.S.
- Listed height: 6 ft 8 in (2.03 m)
- Listed weight: 250 lb (113 kg)

Career information
- High school: Athens (Athens, Alabama)
- College: Alabama (2005–2008)
- NBA draft: 2008: 2nd round, 49th overall pick
- Drafted by: Golden State Warriors
- Playing career: 2008–2021
- Position: Power forward / center
- Number: 35, 7, 5, 33

Career history
- 2008: Bakersfield Jam
- 2008–2009: Dakota Wizards
- 2009–2010: Granada
- 2010–2012: Maccabi Tel Aviv
- 2012–2013: Emporio Armani Milano
- 2013–2015: Lokomotiv Kuban
- 2015–2016: Unicaja
- 2016: Maccabi Tel Aviv
- 2016–2017: Gran Canaria
- 2017–2018: Galatasaray
- 2018–2019: Le Mans
- 2019–2020: Osaka Evessa
- 2020–2021: Niigata Albirex BB

Career highlights
- EuroCup Finals MVP (2013); EuroCup champion (2013); 2× Israeli League champion (2011, 2012); 2× Israeli Basketball State Cup winner (2011, 2012); ABA League champion (2012); Spanish Supercup winner (2016); NBA D-League All-Star (2009); ACB Rising Star Award (2010); Israeli League All-Star (2012); First-team All-SEC (2008); Second-team All-SEC (2007); McDonald's All-American (2005); First-team Parade All-American (2005); Third-team Parade All-American (2004); Alabama Mr. Basketball (2005)
- Stats at Basketball Reference

Venard Richard Hendrix (Macedonian: Венард Ричард Хендрикс; born November 15, 1986) is an American-born naturalized Macedonian former professional basketball player. Hendrix attended the University of Alabama, where he played for the Crimson Tide. He was drafted with 49th pick in the second round of the 2008 NBA draft by the Golden State Warriors. He has also represented North Macedonia in international competitions.

== Early years ==
Richard Hendrix was raised in Athens, Alabama, born the son of two educators. He began his athletic career at the young age of five by playing basketball for the local recreation center. He played soccer, tennis, baseball and football on a competitive level where he was considered a standout on his respective teams. Hendrix attended Athens High School, the same high school that produced NFL pro bowler Philip Rivers.

At Athens High he was a four-year starter on the varsity basketball team, where he was coached by his father, Venard Hendrix. He was named 5A Player of the Year and selected as Alabama Mr. Basketball in 2005. Hendrix finished his career 92 double-doubles, nine triple doubles, and two quadruple doubles. Hendrix scored 2,915 points in his career and currently holds Alabama high school state records (www.ahsaa.com) for career rebounds (1,820) and blocked shots (667). Hendrix is considered one of the most decorated prep basketball players in Alabama high school history. He was selected as a two-time Parade All-American and as a participant in the 2005 McDonald's All-American Boys Game. Hendrix played AAU basketball with the Alabama Lasers Youth Inc.

Considered a five-star recruit by Rivals.com, Hendrix was listed as the No. 3 power forward and the No. 9 player in the nation in 2005.

== College career ==
After a decorated high school career, Hendrix chose to attend the University of Alabama over the University of North Carolina. Hendrix teamed up with future NBA player Alonzo Gee and future European professional players Ronald Steele, Chuck Davis, Jermareo Davidson, and Mykal Riley. Under Head Coach Mark Gottfried, Hendrix and the Crimson Tide experienced its share of highs and lows. After an All-SEC performance in his junior season, Hendrix decided to forgo his final year of college eligibility and opt for the 2008 NBA draft. Hendrix attained his bachelor's degree in Public Relations during his 3 years at "The Capstone."

=== College statistics ===
Year	Team	GP	GS	MPG	FG%	3P%	FT%	RPG	APG	SPG	BPG	PPG
2005–06	Alabama	31	22	27.1	.557	.000	.647	8.0	0.8	0.8	1.5	9.7
2006–07	Alabama	32	32	27.6	.602	.000	.629	8.9	1.9	0.5	1.3	14.6
2007–08	Alabama	32	32	30.6	.598	.286	.537	10.1	1.6	1.3	2.0	17.8
Career		95	86	3.0	.586	.000	.604	9.0	1.4	0.8	1.6	14.0

== Professional career ==
=== NBA ===
Hendrix was drafted by the Golden State Warriors with 49th overall pick in the 2008 NBA draft. Hendrix competed in the preseason for the Warriors registering a double double of 12 points and 13 rebounds in his debut against the Oklahoma City Thunder before making the final roster. After spending several weeks on the inactive list, Hendrix was assigned to the NBA Developmental league. His rights were released by the Warriors on December 18, 2008, to create roster space for the return of Monta Ellis from injury. Hendrix played for the Indiana Pacers in the Orlando Pro Summer League and later the Atlanta Hawks in the NBA Summer League in 2010.

=== D-League ===
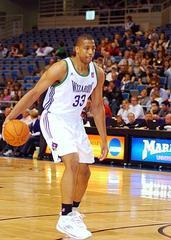
Richard Hendrix playing for the Dakota Wizards

On November 14, 2008, the Golden State Warriors assigned Hendrix to play for their minor league affiliate the Bakersfield Jam. His rights were released by the Golden State Warriors on December 18, 2008, ending his tenure with the Jam.

On December 28, 2008, Hendrix was acquired by the Dakota Wizards, a National Basketball Association Development League team based in Bismarck, North Dakota. Hendrix led the D-League in total rebounds for the 2008–09 season.

He was named to the 2009 NBDL All-Star Game on February 3, 2009. Hendrix was selected as a starter on the Red Team and helped lead his team to 113–103 victory. Hendrix finished the game with 11 points, 6 rebounds, 3 steals, and 2 assist in 20 minutes of playing time.

=== Europe ===
In July 2009, Hendrix signed a one-year contract with Liga ACB team CB Granada. Hendrix helped lead the club the most wins in club history as a member of the Spanish 1st Division. He was awarded the ACB Rising Star Award as the best newcomer in the Spanish league.

On June 30, 2010, Hendrix signed a two-year contract with EuroLeague contenders Tel Aviv.

In June 2012, he signed a two-year deal with Italian team Emporio Armani Milano. However, after averaging only 3.7 points and 3 rebounds over 10 games in the EuroLeague season, he was loaned to the Russian team Lokomotiv Kuban Krasnodar for the rest of the season. On July 16, 2013, it was officially confirmed that Lokomotiv Kuban extended a contract with Hendrix for three more seasons. In July 2015, he parted ways with Lokomotiv.

On July 23, 2015, Hendrix signed a one-year deal with Spanish club Unicaja. On March 9, 2016, he left Unicaja and signed a deal with his former team Maccabi Tel Aviv until the end of the 2016–17 season. On August 20, 2016, he was released by Maccabi. Two days later, he signed with Spanish club Gran Canaria for the rest of the season.

On July 14, 2017, Hendrix signed with Turkish club Galatasaray for the 2017–18 season.

=== Japan ===
On August 19, 2019, he has signed with Osaka Evessa of the B.League. He averaged 16 points, 10 rebounds and 3 assists per game. Hendrix signed with Niigata Albirex BB on June 17, 2020.

== Personal life ==
Hendrix was hired by ESPN in 2023 as a College Basketball Analyst. Calling men's and women's games on SEC Network and the ESPN family of networks. In 2024 he was selected as an SEC Legend, representing the University of Alabama.

== Career statistics ==
Legend
GP	Games played	GS	Games started	MPG	Minutes per game
FG%	Field-goal percentage	3P%	3-point field-goal percentage	FT%	Free-throw percentage
RPG	Rebounds per game	APG	Assists per game	SPG	Steals per game
BPG	Blocks per game	PPG	Points per game	PIR	Performance index rating
**Bold**	Career high

=== EuroLeague ===
Year	Team	GP	GS	MPG	FG%	3P%	FT%	RPG	APG	SPG	BPG	PPG	PIR
2010–11	Maccabi Tel Aviv	21	1	14.0	.565	.000	.542	4.8	.2	**.6**	.9	5.6	7.4
2011–12	Maccabi Tel Aviv	21	6	20.4	.519	**.500**	**.780**	5.4	.8	**.6**	**1.3**	8.9	11.0
2012–13	Olimpia Milano	10	2	12.0	.412	.000	.750	3.0	.1	**.6**	.2	3.7	3.1
2013–14	Lokomotiv	**23**	**15**	**23.8**	.577	.250	.696	**7.3**	**1.9**	.6	1.1	**10.5**	**14.7**
2015–16	Unicaja	16	14	21.1	**.578**	.250	.500	6.2	1.8	**.7**	.8	9.0	12.4
Career		91	38	19.0	.548	.300	.674	5.6	1.0	.6	.9	8.0	10.5

=== EuroCup ===
Year	Team	GP	GS	MPG	FG%	3P%	FT%	RPG	APG	SPG	BPG	PPG	PIR
2012–13	Lokomotiv	8	6	**21.3**	**.600**	.000	**.625**	5.5	**1.1**	1.0	**1.4**	**10.4**	**13.0**
2014–15	Lokomotiv	**17**	6	20.2	.594	.000	.600	**6.5**	**1.1**	**1.3**	1.0	7.8	12.8
2016–17	Gran Canaria	15	**8**	18.0	.610	.000	.677	3.6	**1.1**	.9	.7	7.7	9.9
Career		25	12	20.5	.596	.000	.605	6.2	1.1	1.2	1.1	7.8	12.8

=== Domestic leagues ===
Season	Team	League	GP	MPG	FG%	3P%	FT%	RPG	APG	SPG	BPG	PPG
2008–09	Bakersfield Jam	D-League	9	28.7	.506	.667	.675	10.9	1.7	1.1	1.2	13.9
2008–09	Dakota Wizards	D-League	39	31.5	.574	.375	.599	11.6	1.4	1.0	1.6	14.6
2009–10	CB Granada	ACB	34	25.8	.652	–	.596	6.9	1.0	1.3	1.3	13.1
2010–11	Maccabi Tel Aviv B.C.	ISBL	27	14.5	.669	.000	.706	4.7	.6	.6	.8	7.6
2011–12	Maccabi Tel Aviv B.C.	ISBL	28	21.6	.637	.333	.733	6.9	1.3	.9	1.3	11.3
2011–12	Maccabi Tel Aviv B.C.	Adriatic League	25	17.5	.660	–	.683	5.1	.8	1.2	1.0	9.8
2012–13	EA7 Emporio Armani Milano	LBA	11	13.7	.448	–	.733	4.5	.4	.3	.8	6.6
2012–13	PBC Lokomotiv-Kuban	PBL	7	22.0	.633	–	.500	6.3	.9	.4	1.4	10.4
2012–13	PBC Lokomotiv-Kuban	VTB	20	18.7	.614	.000	.676	5.0	.9	1.2	1.4	7.5
2013–14	PBC Lokomotiv-Kuban	VTB	24	20.7	.605	.333	.644	6.2	1.2	1.3	1.3	9.6
2014–15	PBC Lokomotiv-Kuban	VTB	36	21.1	.659	.333	.535	6.8	1.4	1.2	1.4	9.8

== Awards and accomplishments ==
=== High school career ===
- Alabama Mr. Basketball (2005)
- Third-team Parade All-American (2004)
- First-team Parade All-American (2005)
- 2005 McDonald's All-American Boys Game

=== College career ===
- SEC All-Freshman Team (Unanimous Choice) (2006)
- 2nd Team All-SEC (2007)
- 1st Team All-SEC (2008)
- Academic All-SEC (2008)
