= Dwayne Harris =

American football player (born 1987)

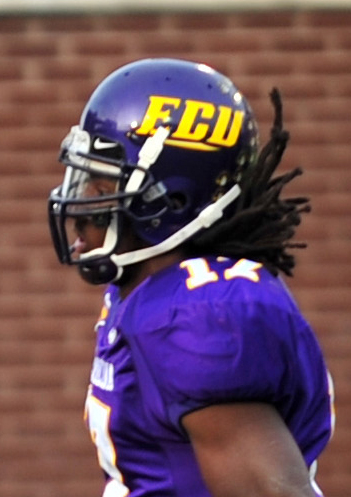
- Harris with the East Carolina Pirates in 2009

No. 17, 82
- Positions: Wide receiver, return specialist

Personal information
- Born: September 16, 1987 (age 39); Atlanta, Georgia, U.S.
- Listed height: 5 ft 10 in (1.78 m)
- Listed weight: 215 lb (98 kg)

Career information
- High school: Tucker (Tucker, Georgia)
- College: East Carolina (2006–2010)
- NFL draft: 2011: 6th round, 176th overall pick

Career history
- Dallas Cowboys (2011–2014); New York Giants (2015–2017); Oakland Raiders (2018–2019); Houston Texans (2020)*; Chicago Bears (2020)
- * Offseason or practice squad member only

Awards and highlights
- Pro Bowl (2016); C-USA Most Valuable Player (2010); 2× All-C-USA (2009, 2010); C-USA Special Teams POY (2009)

Career NFL statistics
- Games played: 109
- Receptions: 77
- Receiving yards: 874
- Rushing yards: 37
- Return yards: 6,110
- Total touchdowns: 13
- Stats at Pro Football Reference

Dwayne Lenard Harris (born September 16, 1987) is an American former professional football player who was a wide receiver and return specialist in the National Football League (NFL). He played college football for the East Carolina Pirates. He was selected by the Dallas Cowboys in the sixth round of the 2011 NFL draft.

== Early life ==
Harris played quarterback for the football team at Tucker High School in Tucker, Georgia. He was considered one of the best quarterbacks in the southeast by Prep Star Magazine. He was a 4A All-State selection, leading Tucker to a 10–1 record his senior year.

== College career ==
As a redshirt freshman, he played in all 13 games and was named to the conference's all freshmen team as a punt returner. East Carolina University won the 2007 Hawaii Bowl against Boise State on a team that also featured future NFL running back, Chris Johnson. As a sophomore, he played in 10 games before injuring his foot playing against Southern Miss. Regardless of his injury, East Carolina University won the 2008 Conference USA Championship against Tulsa.

In his junior year, he was named to the Conference USA first-team and as the C-USA Special Teams Player of the Year. He played in all 14 games, including a victory against Houston in the 2009 C-USA Championship and a loss to Arkansas in the 2010 Liberty Bowl. In his senior year, Harris played in all 13 games and won the C-USA MVP award. The Pirates lost to Maryland in the 2010 Military Bowl.

He finished his college career with school records for receptions (268) and receiving yards (3,001). He was the first player in school history to top 100 receptions in a season (101 as a senior) and the second player to gain over 6,000 career all-purpose yards (6,380). He is second in school history with 102 kickoff returns for 2,374 yards.

=== College statistics ===
Year	School	Conf	Class	Pos	G	Receiving				Rushing			
Year	School	Conf	Class	Pos	G	Rec	Yds	Avg	TD	Att	Yds	Avg	TD
2007	East Carolina	CUSA	FR	WR	13	26	246	9.5	2	20	197	9.9	1
2008	East Carolina	CUSA	SO	WR	10	58	654	11.3	1	19	76	4.0	0
2009	East Carolina	CUSA	JR	WR	14	83	978	11.8	7	31	149	4.8	5
2010	East Carolina	CUSA	SR	WR	13	101	1,123	11.1	10	16	104	6.5	0
Career	East Carolina				50	268	3,001	11.2	20	86	526	6.1	6

== Professional career ==
Pre-draft measurables
Height	Weight	Arm length	Hand span	Wingspan	40-yard dash	10-yard split	20-yard split	20-yard shuttle	Three-cone drill	Vertical jump	Broad jump	Bench press
5 ft 10 3/8 in (1.79 m)	203 lb (92 kg)	31 1/8 in (0.79 m)	10 1/8 in (0.26 m)	6 ft 1 3/8 in (1.86 m)	4.51 s	1.75 s	2.55 s	4.21 s	6.77 s	34.0 in (0.86 m)	9 ft 3 in (2.82 m)	10 reps
All values from NFL Combine/Pro Day

=== Dallas Cowboys ===
Harris was selected by the Dallas Cowboys in the sixth round with the 176th overall pick in the 2011 NFL draft. In his first career pre-season appearance, he had a great performance against the Denver Broncos, recording five receptions for 127 yards and two touchdowns (including a 76-yard touchdown reception), in just two quarters of work. Unfortunately, his first year was mostly a disappointment, with the Cowboys releasing him on October 18 and signing him to their practice squad. He eventually was signed back to the active roster on December 14. As a rookie, he appeared in just seven games, returning 15 punts for 80 yards.

In 2012, he had his first career punt return for a touchdown during a Week 10 game against the Philadelphia Eagles. His 78-yard return broke a fourth-quarter tie and earned him NFC Special Teams Player of the Week honors. His impact as a returner in special teams convinced the coaching staff to give him more opportunities at wide receiver. Despite being active all season, it was not until week 12 against the Washington Redskins on Thanksgiving that he started to produce as a receiver, catching four passes for 71 yards. He finished second in the NFL in punt return average (16.1 yards).

In 2013, Harris started to be used as a gunner on special teams and in the opening game against the New York Giants, his three coverage tackles and his effort in forcing one of the Giants’ six turnovers, earned him NFC Special Teams Player of the Week. He was again named NFC Special Teams Player of the Week, after his Week 6 performance against Washington. He registered 222 total return yards which outgained the Cowboys’ offense by nine yards, including an 88-yard punt return for a touchdown and a 90-yard kickoff return. He also became the third player (Chris Boniol and Billy Cundiff were the first) in team history to win the NFC Special Teams Player of the Week two times in a season. Although he was injured in three of the last four games of the season, he tied for second on the team with 12 special teams tackles, finished ranked third in punt return average (12.8) and second in kick return average (30.6) in the NFL. As a wide receiver he had nine receptions for 80 yards and two touchdowns, including the game-winner against the Minnesota Vikings.

In 2014, he led the team with 18 special teams tackles, but all of his other stats dropped off from the previous year. The team struggled in the return game and he was rarely targeted as the fourth wide receiver.

Harris left as the franchise's all-time leader on kickoff returns with a 26.5-yard career average and a single-season 30.6-yard average in 2013. He finished tied for second with an 11.1-yard career punt return average. He is considered to be one of the best special teams players in Dallas Cowboys history.

=== New York Giants ===
On March 10, 2015, he signed a five-year, $17 million contract with the New York Giants as an unrestricted free agent. The deal included $7.1 million guaranteed with a $4 million signing bonus. Although he was acquired to serve primarily as a return man on special teams, he passed Preston Parker on the depth chart as the slot wide receiver, before injuries to the receivers corp forced him to start six games during the season. Against the Buffalo Bills he recorded five receptions for 51 yards and one touchdown. In the next contest, he had a career-high six receptions for 72 yards in a win over the San Francisco 49ers. On October 25, he returned a fourth quarter kickoff 100 yards (tied a team record) for the deciding touchdown against his former team, as the Giants defeated the Cowboys, 27–20. For his efforts, he was named NFC Special Teams Player of the Week. On December 6, he returned a punt 80 yards for a touchdown in a 23–20 overtime loss to the New York Jets, becoming the first player in franchise history to have a punt return, a kickoff return and a reception go for touchdowns in a single-season. He recorded six receptions for 82 yards and one touchdown, in a loss against the New England Patriots. He was declared inactive for the last game with a shoulder injury, finishing with career-highs in receptions (36), receiving yards (396) and receiving touchdowns (four). He finished third in the league with a 28.7-yard kick return average and seventh with a 10.0-yard punt return average.

In 2016, at times he was taken off returns because of struggles with ball security and sometimes questionable decision-making. He still finished fifth in the league in kick return average (24.2 yards) and had a 5.9 yards punt return average. He posted 7 special teams tackles. He had one touchdown in his only reception of the season, that came in a week 12 win against the Cleveland Browns. He was also named to his first Pro Bowl.

On March 21, 2017, he restructured his contract after the Giants signed free agent wide receiver Brandon Marshall. In Week 5 of the 2017 season, Harris suffered a foot fracture which required surgery, and was placed on injured reserve on October 9, 2017. He appeared in five games and had nine kickoff returns for 188 net yards for a 20.88 average and seven punt returns for 48 net yards for a 6.86 average.

On March 22, 2018, Harris was released by the Giants.

=== Oakland Raiders ===
On April 2, 2018, Harris signed with the Oakland Raiders. He was named the Raiders primary kick and punt returner to start the 2018 season. In Week 4, Harris returned five kicks for an average of 19.5 yards, including a 49-yard punt return in a 45–42 win over the Cleveland Browns, earning him AFC Special Teams Player of the Week. On December 24, in Week 16, he returned a punt 99 yards for a touchdown against the Denver Broncos, earning him another AFC Special Teams Player of the Week. The 99-yard return was the second longest punt return in NFL history. He finished the season with 29 kickoff returns for 663 net yards for a 22.86 average to go along with 20 punt returns for 281 net yards for a 14.05 average.

On March 18, 2019, Harris re-signed with the Raiders. He was placed on injured reserve on November 18.

After becoming a free agent in March 2020, Harris had a tryout with the Baltimore Ravens on August 18, 2020.

=== Houston Texans ===
On September 21, 2020, Harris was signed to the Houston Texans' practice squad. He was released on October 12.

=== Chicago Bears ===
On October 27, 2020, Harris was signed to the Chicago Bears practice squad. He was elevated to the active roster four days later ahead of the Bears' week 8 game against the New Orleans Saints, and reverted to the practice squad after the game. He was then promoted to the active roster on November 7 to take over as the primary return specialist. In the Bears' week 10 home loss to the Minnesota Vikings, Harris tore his triceps after he muffed a punt and attempted to recover it. Harris was placed on injured reserve on November 19.

== NFL career statistics ==
=== Regular season ===
Year	Team	Games		Receiving					Rushing					Returning					Fumbles	
Year	Team	GP	GS	Rec	Yds	Avg	Lng	TD	Att	Yds	Avg	Lng	TD	Ret	Yds	Avg	Lng	TD	Fum	Lost
2011	DAL	7	0	0	0	0.0	0	0	0	0	0.0	0	0	23	311	13.5	51	0	0	0
2012	DAL	16	0	17	222	13.1	36	1	0	0	0.0	0	0	33	564	17.1	78	1	1	0
2013	DAL	13	3	9	80	8.9	24T	2	1	6	6.0	6	0	48	1,113	23.2	90	1	2	1
2014	DAL	16	0	7	116	16.6	56	0	4	7	1.8	9	0	60	1,017	17.0	42	0	4	2
2015	NYG	15	6	36	396	11.0	38	4	2	12	6.0	11	0	56	972	17.4	100T	2	3	0
2016	NYG	16	1	1	13	13.0	13T	1	0	0	0.0	0	0	51	703	13.8	51	0	3	1
2017	NYG	5	1	0	0	0.0	0	0	0	0	0.0	0	0	16	236	14.8	30	0	0	0
2018	OAK	15	1	6	40	6.7	13	0	2	12	2.0	13	0	49	996	19.2	99T	1	2	0
2019	OAK	3	0	1	7	7.0	7	0	0	0	0.0	0	0	7	169	21.1	72	0	0	0
2020	CHI	3	0	0	0	0.0	0	0	0	0	0.0	0	0	10	81	8.1	19	0	1	1
Career		109	12	77	874	11.4	56	8	9	37	4.1	13	0	353	6,110	17.6	100T	5	16	5
