= Rashad Moore =

American football player (born 1979)

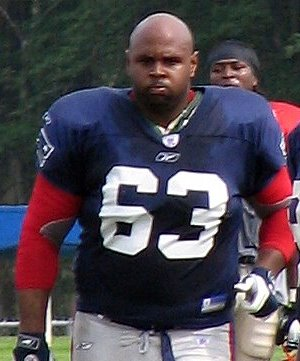
- Moore with the New England Patriots in 2007

No. 95, 77
- Position: Defensive tackle

Personal information
- Born: March 16, 1979 (age 47); Huntsville, Alabama, U.S.
- Listed height: 6 ft 3 in (1.91 m)
- Listed weight: 325 lb (147 kg)

Career information
- High school: Johnson (Huntsville)
- College: Tennessee
- NFL draft: 2003: 6th round, 183rd overall pick

Career history
- Seattle Seahawks (2003–2004); Oakland Raiders (2006)*; New York Jets (2006); New England Patriots (2007); Atlanta Falcons (2008)*
- * Offseason or practice squad member only

Awards and highlights
- BCS national champion (1998)

Career NFL statistics
- Total tackles: 94
- Sacks: 3
- Forced fumbles: 1
- Fumble recoveries: 4
- Pass deflections: 2
- Stats at Pro Football Reference

Glenn Rashad Moore (born March 16, 1979) is an American former professional football player who was a defensive tackle in the National Football League (NFL). He was selected by the Seattle Seahawks in the sixth round of the 2003 NFL draft. He played college football for the Tennessee Volunteers.

Moore was also a member of the Oakland Raiders, New York Jets, New England Patriots, and the Atlanta Falcons.

== Early life ==
Moore attended Johnson High School in Huntsville, Alabama and was a student and a letterman in football and basketball. In football, as a senior, he posted 65 tackles, 10.5 sacks, and three fumble recoveries. In basketball, he was an All-Metropolitan selection and an All-Area selection.

== College career ==
From 1998 through 2002 Moore attended the University of Tennessee. He played at defensive tackle the last four years (1999–2002) and totaled 95 tackles and 3.5 sacks. He majored in Psychology.

== Professional career ==
In 2003 the Seattle Seahawks selected Moore in the sixth round (183rd overall) of the 2003 NFL draft. In his rookie season he played in 14 games and made 30 total tackles and one sack. The next season (2004), he played in all sixteen of the Seahawks' regular season games and made 46 total tackles and two sacks. After completing the team's 2005 training camp, Moore was released from the team. He did not play for any team in 2005. In 2006, he was signed by the New York Jets and he played in thirteen games, making 10 total tackles. On June 8, 2007, the New England Patriots signed Moore to a contract. He played with the team in all four of the 2007 preseason games before being released on September 1, 2007 in the team's final roster cutdown. On December 19, 2007, the Patriots re-signed him.

On March 7, 2008, he signed with the Atlanta Falcons.
