= 2010 East Carolina Pirates football team =

American college football season

2010 East Carolina Pirates football

Military Bowl, L 20–51 vs. Maryland
- Conference: Conference USA
- East
- Record: 6–7 (5–3 C-USA)
- Head coach: Ruffin McNeill (1st season)
- Offensive coordinator: Lincoln Riley (1st season)
- Offensive scheme: Air raid
- Defensive coordinator: Brian Mitchell (1st season)
- Base defense: 4–3
- Home stadium: Dowdy–Ficklen Stadium

2010 Conference USA football standings
| | Conf. | | | Overall |
| Team | W | | L | W | | L |
|---|---|---|---|---|---|---|
East Division
| No. 21 UCF x$ | 7 | – | 1 | 11 | – | 3 |
| East Carolina | 5 | – | 3 | 6 | – | 7 |
| Southern Miss | 5 | – | 3 | 8 | – | 5 |
| Marshall | 4 | – | 4 | 5 | – | 7 |
| UAB | 3 | – | 5 | 4 | – | 8 |
| Memphis | 0 | – | 8 | 1 | – | 11 |
West Division
| SMU xy | 6 | – | 2 | 7 | – | 7 |
| No. 24 Tulsa x | 6 | – | 2 | 10 | – | 3 |
| Houston | 4 | – | 4 | 5 | – | 7 |
| UTEP | 3 | – | 5 | 6 | – | 7 |
| Rice | 3 | – | 5 | 4 | – | 8 |
| Tulane | 2 | – | 6 | 4 | – | 8 |
Championship: UCF 17, SMU 7
$ – Conference champion; x – Division champion/co-champions; y – Championship game participant; As of January 11, 2011; Rankings from AP Poll

The 2010 East Carolina Pirates football team represented East Carolina University in the 2010 NCAA Division I FBS football season. The Pirates played their home games in Dowdy–Ficklen Stadium and were led by head coach Ruffin McNeill, a former Pirate football player and former Texas Tech defensive coordinator. He was in his first year as head coach. They were members of Conference USA. After winning consecutive C-USA championships, the Pirates finished the season 6–7, 5–3 in C-USA and were invited to the Military Bowl where they were defeated by Maryland 20–51.

== Before the season ==
=== Recruiting ===
College recruiting information (2010)
| Name | Hometown | School | Height | Weight | 40^{‡} | Commit date |
|---|---|---|---|---|---|---|
| Detric Allen; DB | Norwood, NC | South Stanly HS | 6 ft 1 in (1.85 m) | 179 lb (81 kg) | 4.5 | Jul 29, 2009 |
| Detric Allen; DB | Recruit ratings: Scout: Rivals: ESPN: | | | | | |
| Desi Brown; QB | Webster Groves, MO | Webster Groves HS | 6 ft 2 in (1.88 m) | 189 lb (86 kg) | 4.6 | Jun 29, 2009 |
| Desi Brown; QB | Recruit ratings: Scout: Rivals: ESPN: | | | | | |
| Shane Carden; QB | Bellaire, TX | Episcopal HS | 6 ft 3 in (1.91 m) | 205 lb (93 kg) | N/A | Feb 3, 2010 |
| Shane Carden; QB | Recruit ratings: Scout: Rivals: (40) | | | | | |
| Dominique Davis; QB | Fort Scott, KS | Fort Scott CC | 6 ft 4 in (1.93 m) | 200 lb (91 kg) | 4.5 | Nov 2, 2009 |
| Dominique Davis; QB | Recruit ratings: Scout: Rivals: | | | | | |
| Maurice Falls; LB | Belmont, NC | South Point HS | 6 ft 3 in (1.91 m) | 220 lb (100 kg) | 4.5 | Aug 11, 2009 |
| Maurice Falls; LB | Recruit ratings: Scout: Rivals: (40) | | | | | |
| Anthony Garrett; OL | Fort Scott, KS | Fort Scott CC | 6 ft 5 in (1.96 m) | 295 lb (134 kg) | N/A | Jan 28, 2010 |
| Anthony Garrett; OL | Recruit ratings: Scout: Rivals: | | | | | |
| Jacob Geary; LB | Hillsborough, NC | Cedar Ridge HS | 6 ft 3 in (1.91 m) | 225 lb (102 kg) | N/A | Sep 9, 2009 |
| Jacob Geary; LB | Recruit ratings: Scout: Rivals: ESPN: | | | | | |
| Drew Gentry; OL | Tallahassee, FL | North Florida Christian | 6 ft 6 in (1.98 m) | 284 lb (129 kg) | N/A | Apr 20, 2009 |
| Drew Gentry; OL | Recruit ratings: Scout: Rivals: ESPN: | | | | | |
| Jeremy Grove; LB | Ijamsville, MD | Thomas Johnson HS | 6 ft 1 in (1.85 m) | 231 lb (105 kg) | 4.8 | May 20, 2009 |
| Jeremy Grove; LB | Recruit ratings: Scout: Rivals: ESPN: | | | | | |
| Mack Helms; OL | Tallahassee, FL | Leon HS | 6 ft 4 in (1.93 m) | 275 lb (125 kg) | N/A | Sep 9, 2009 |
| Mack Helms; OL | Recruit ratings: Scout: Rivals: (40) | | | | | |
| Taylor Hudson; OL | Mauldin, SC | Mauldin | 6 ft 5 in (1.96 m) | 290 lb (130 kg) | 5.4 | Jul 27, 2009 |
| Taylor Hudson; OL | Recruit ratings: Scout: Rivals: ESPN: | | | | | |
| Lamar Ivey; ATH | Mebane, NC | Eastern Alamance HS | 6 ft 1 in (1.85 m) | 182 lb (83 kg) | 4.4 | Jan 31, 2010 |
| Lamar Ivey; ATH | Recruit ratings: Scout: Rivals: ESPN: | | | | | |
| Bradley Jacobs; DB | Perkinston, MS | Gulf Coast CC | 6 ft 0 in (1.83 m) | 190 lb (86 kg) | 4.5 | Dec 18, 2009 |
| Bradley Jacobs; DB | Recruit ratings: Scout: Rivals: | | | | | |
| Derrell Johnson; DE | Baltimore, MD | Wyoming Seminary | 6 ft 1 in (1.85 m) | 220 lb (100 kg) | N/A | Feb 3, 2010 |
| Derrell Johnson; DE | Recruit ratings: Scout: Rivals: (40) | | | | | |
| Lance Lewis; WR | Scooba, MS | East Mississippi CC | 6 ft 3 in (1.91 m) | 200 lb (91 kg) | N/A | Feb 5, 2010 |
| Lance Lewis; WR | Recruit ratings: Scout: Rivals: | | | | | |
| Damon Magazu; ATH | Charlotte, NC | Providence HS | 5 ft 11 in (1.80 m) | 170 lb (77 kg) | 4.5 | Apr 21, 2009 |
| Damon Magazu; ATH | Recruit ratings: Scout: Rivals: ESPN: | | | | | |
| Alex Owah; RB | Chatham, VA | Hargrave Military Academy | 5 ft 11 in (1.80 m) | 190 lb (86 kg) | N/A | Dec 24, 2009 |
| Alex Owah; RB | Recruit ratings: Scout: Rivals: ESPN: | | | | | |
| Lee Pegues; DE | Bennettsville, SC | Marlboro County HS | 6 ft 2 in (1.88 m) | 243 lb (110 kg) | N/A | Aug 3, 2009 |
| Lee Pegues; DE | Recruit ratings: Scout: Rivals: ESPN: | | | | | |
| Torian Richardson; WR | Duncan, SC | Byrnes HS | 5 ft 10 in (1.78 m) | 169 lb (77 kg) | 4.7 | Feb 4, 2010 |
| Torian Richardson; WR | Recruit ratings: Scout: Rivals: ESPN: | | | | | |
| Crishon Rose; DT | Forestville, MD | Bishop McNamara HS | 6 ft 3 in (1.91 m) | 259 lb (117 kg) | 4.8 | Jan 12, 2010 |
| Crishon Rose; DT | Recruit ratings: Scout: Rivals: ESPN: | | | | | |
| Diavalo Simpson; OL | Scooba, MS | East Mississippi CC | 6 ft 3 in (1.91 m) | 275 lb (125 kg) | N/A | Dec 19, 2009 |
| Diavalo Simpson; OL | Recruit ratings: Scout: Rivals: | | | | | |
| Terry Williams; LB | Loganville, GA | Grayson HS | 6 ft 0 in (1.83 m) | 252 lb (114 kg) | 4.7 | Oct 22, 2009 |
| Terry Williams; LB | Recruit ratings: Scout: Rivals: ESPN: | | | | | |
Overall recruit ranking: Scout: 110 Rivals: 79
‡ Refers to 40-yard dash; Note: In many cases, Scout, Rivals, 247Sports, On3, and ESPN may conflict in their listings of height, weight and 40 time.; In these cases, the average was taken. ESPN grades are on a 100-point scale.; Sources: "East Carolina 2010 Football Commitments". Rivals.; "Football Recruiting Commits". Scout.; "2010 Player commits". ESPN.; "Scout.com Team Recruiting Rankings". Scout.; "2010 Team Ranking". Rivals.com.

=== Purple/Gold Spring Game ===
The annual Purple/Gold Spring Game was held in the spring during the PirateFest and Pigskin Pigout weekend activities on April 17 in downtown Greenville, NC. Due to the stadium expansion in the East endzone, the format of the game was changed to a modified half-field scrimmage, with both teams taking turns on offense and defense.

== Schedule ==
| Date | Time | Opponent | Site | TV | Result | Attendance |
|---|---|---|---|---|---|---|
| September 5 | 2:00 pm | Tulsa | Dowdy–Ficklen Stadium; Greenville, NC | ESPN2 | W 51–49 | 50,010 |
| September 11 | 12:00 pm | Memphis | Dowdy–Ficklen Stadium; Greenville, NC | WITN-TV/CSS | W 49–27 | 48,123 |
| September 18 | 1:30 pm | at Virginia Tech* | Lane Stadium; Blacksburg, VA | ESPN3 | L 27–49 | 66,233 |
| October 2 | 3:30 pm | at North Carolina* | Kenan Memorial Stadium; Chapel Hill, NC | ESPN3 | L 17–42 | 60,000 |
| October 9 | 7:30 pm | at Southern Miss | M. M. Roberts Stadium; Hattiesburg, MS | WITN-TV/CSS | W 44–43 | 32,334 |
| October 16 | 12:00 pm | NC State* | Dowdy–Ficklen Stadium; Greenville, NC (Victory Barrel) | CBSCS | W 33–27 ^{OT} | 50,410 |
| October 23 | 4:15 pm | Marshall^{†} | Dowdy–Ficklen Stadium; Greenville, NC (rivalry) | WITN-TV/CSS | W 37–10 | 50,145 |
| October 30 | 3:30 pm | at UCF | Bright House Networks Stadium; Orlando, FL | BHSN/WITN-TV | L 35–49 | 40,073 |
| November 6 | 3:30 pm | Navy* | Dowdy–Ficklen Stadium; Greenville, NC | MASN | L 35–76 | 50,191 |
| November 11 | 8:00 pm | at UAB | Legion Field; Birmingham, AL | CBSCS | W 54–42 | 14,083 |
| November 20 | 1:00 pm | at Rice | Rice Stadium; Houston, TX | WITN-TV/CSS | L 38–62 | 15,262 |
| November 26 | 2:00 pm | SMU | Dowdy–Ficklen Stadium; Greenville, NC | CBSCS | L 38–45 ^{OT} | 49,108 |
| December 29 | 2:30 p.m. | vs. Maryland* | RFK Stadium; Washington, D.C. (Military Bowl) | ESPN | L 20–51 | 38,062 |
*Non-conference game; ^{†}Homecoming; All times are in Eastern time

== Coaching staff ==
| Position | Name | Years at ECU | Alma Mater |
|---|---|---|---|
| Head Coach: | Ruffin McNeil | 1st (2nd overall) | East Carolina '80 |
| Associate head coach/ Linebackers Coach: | John Wiley | 1st | East Texas State '84 |
| Defensive coordinator Secondary Coach: | Brian Mitchell | 1st | Brigham Young '90 |
| Offensive coordinator/ Quarterbacks Coach: | Lincoln Riley | 1st | Texas Tech '06 |
| Offensive Linemen Coach: | Brandon Jones | 1st | Texas Tech '06 |
| Inside Receivers Coach/recruiting coordinator | Donnie Kirkpatrick | 6th | Lenoir-Rhyne '82 |
| Running backs coach: | Clay McGuire | 1st | Texas Tech '04 |
| Outside Receivers Coach | Dennis Simmons | 1st | Brigham Young '96 |
| Defensive tackle Coach | Marc Yellock | 1st (3rd overall) | East Carolina '00 |
| Assistant coach | Thomas Roggeman | 6th | Notre Dame '85 |
| Director of Strength & Conditioning | Michael Golden | 6th | Central Connecticut State '92 |
| Director of HS Football Relations | Harold Robinson | 7th | East Carolina '72 |
| Director of football administration | Cary Godette | 1st (6th overall) | East Carolina '76 |
| Director of football operations | Reed Case | 3rd | Ohio '95 |
| Administrative Assistant to Ruffin McNeil | Ryan Mills | 7th | North Carolina '02 |
| Administrative Assistant | Jamie Benna | 2nd | East Carolina '08 |
| Administrative Assistant | Ann Coyle | 4th | East Carolina '06 |

== Depth chart ==
Defense

FS
Derek Blacknall
Justin Venable

| WLB | MLB | SLB |
|---|---|---|
| ⋅ | Melvin Patterson | ⋅ |
| Cliff Perryman | Ty Holmes | ⋅ |

SS
Bradley Jacobs
Damon Magazu

CB
Emanuel Davis
Rahkeem Morgan

| DE | DT | DT | DE |
|---|---|---|---|
| Matt Milner | Robert Jones | Josh Smith | Derrell Johnson |
| Lee Pegues | Jimmy Booth | Antonio Allison | A.J. Johnson |

CB
Travis Simmons
Jacobi Jenkins

Offense

X-Receiver
Lance Lewis
Dayon Arrington

H-Receiver
Michael Bowman
Jeremy Davis

| LT | LG | C | RG | RT |
|---|---|---|---|---|
| Willie Smith | Doug Polochak | Dalton Faulds | Cory Dowless | D.J. Scott |
| Jordan Davis | Cory Dowless | Doug Polochak | D.J. Scott | Grant Harner |

Y-Receiver
Dwayne Harris
Justin Jones

Z-Receiver
Andrew Bodenheimer
Mike Price

QB
Dominique Davis
Brad Wornick

RB
Jonathan Williams
Giavanni Ruffin

Special teams
PK Michael Barbour
P Ben Ryan
KR Jonathan Williams
PR Dwayne Harris
LS William Smith
H Trent Tignor

== Game summaries ==
=== Tulsa ===
| | 1 | 2 | 3 | 4 | Total |
|---|---|---|---|---|---|
| Golden Hurricane | 7 | 9 | 13 | 20 | 49 |
| Pirates | 10 | 7 | 7 | 27 | 51 |

| Statistics | TLSA | ECU |
|---|---|---|
| First downs | 27 | 27 |
| Total yards | 579 | 538 |
| Rushing yards | 180 | 155 |
| Passing yards | 399 | 383 |
| Turnovers | 2 | 1 |
| Time of possession | 31:43 | 28:17 |

| Team | Category | Player | Statistics |
|---|---|---|---|
| Tulsa | Passing | G. J. Kinne | 28/43, 399 yards, 5 TD, INT |
| Tulsa | Rushing | Damaris Johnson | 7 rushes, 56 yards, TD |
| Tulsa | Receiving | Charles Clay | 8 receptions, 86 yards, TD |
| East Carolina | Passing | Dominique Davis | 27/46, 383 yards, 5 TD, INT |
| East Carolina | Rushing | Jonathan Williams | 15 rushes, 92 yards, TD |
| East Carolina | Receiving | Dwayne Harris | 7 receptions, 121 yards, 2 TD |

The Pirates defeated the Golden Hurricane 51–49 on a hail mary pass from Quarterback Dominique Davis to freshman receiver Justin Jones as time expired. East Carolina began the season 1–0 overall and in conference as Tulsa fell to 0–1. The two teams are now tied in the all-time series, 5–5.

=== Memphis ===
| | 1 | 2 | 3 | 4 | Total |
|---|---|---|---|---|---|
| Tigers | 3 | 7 | 7 | 10 | 27 |
| Pirates | 28 | 7 | 7 | 7 | 49 |

| Statistics | MEM | ECU |
|---|---|---|
| First downs | 20 | 27 |
| Total yards | 413 | 425 |
| Rushing yards | 101 | 161 |
| Passing yards | 312 | 264 |
| Turnovers | 3 | 0 |
| Time of possession | 31:10 | 28:50 |

| Team | Category | Player | Statistics |
|---|---|---|---|
| Memphis | Passing | Ryan Williams | 18/25, 293 yards, 3 TD |
| Memphis | Rushing | Jerrell Rhodes | 17 rushes, 59 yards |
| Memphis | Receiving | Curtis Johnson | 4 receptions, 50 yards |
| East Carolina | Passing | Dominique Davis | 28/39, 256 yards, 3 TD |
| East Carolina | Rushing | Jonathan Williams | 17 rushes, 109 yards, TD |
| East Carolina | Receiving | Dwayne Harris | 6 receptions, 54 yards, TD |

=== At Virginia Tech ===
| | 1 | 2 | 3 | 4 | Total |
|---|---|---|---|---|---|
| Pirates | 10 | 14 | 3 | 0 | 27 |
| Hokies | 7 | 14 | 14 | 14 | 49 |

| Statistics | ECU | VT |
|---|---|---|
| First downs | 22 | 22 |
| Total yards | 361 | 448 |
| Rushing yards | 110 | 249 |
| Passing yards | 251 | 199 |
| Turnovers | 2 | 1 |
| Time of possession | 32:43 | 27:17 |

| Team | Category | Player | Statistics |
|---|---|---|---|
| East Carolina | Passing | Dominique Davis | 30/44, 251 yards, TD, 2 INT |
| East Carolina | Rushing | Jonathan Williams | 17 rushes, 72 yards, 2 TD |
| East Carolina | Receiving | Dwayne Harris | 10 receptions, 119 yards, TD |
| Virginia Tech | Passing | Tyrod Taylor | 8/16, 199 yards, 2 TD |
| Virginia Tech | Rushing | Darren Evans | 10 rushes, 91 yards, TD |
| Virginia Tech | Receiving | Jarrett Boykin | 3 receptions, 118 yards, TD |

=== At North Carolina ===
| | 1 | 2 | 3 | 4 | Total |
|---|---|---|---|---|---|
| Pirates | 7 | 7 | 3 | 0 | 17 |
| Tar Heels | 7 | 7 | 14 | 14 | 42 |

| Statistics | ECU | UNC |
|---|---|---|
| First downs | 21 | 25 |
| Total yards | 347 | 444 |
| Rushing yards | 64 | 263 |
| Passing yards | 283 | 181 |
| Turnovers | 3 | 0 |
| Time of possession | 24:24 | 35:36 |

| Team | Category | Player | Statistics |
|---|---|---|---|
| East Carolina | Passing | Dominique Davis | 33/51, 244 yards, TD, 3 INT |
| East Carolina | Rushing | Jonathan Williams | 8 rushes, 33 yards |
| East Carolina | Receiving | Lance Lewis | 9 receptions, 68 yards, TD |
| North Carolina | Passing | T. J. Yates | 18/26, 181 yards, 2 TD |
| North Carolina | Rushing | Johnny White | 16 rushes, 140 yards |
| North Carolina | Receiving | Zack Pianalto | 7 receptions, 95 yards |

=== At Southern Miss ===
| | 1 | 2 | 3 | 4 | Total |
|---|---|---|---|---|---|
| Pirates | 0 | 17 | 21 | 6 | 44 |
| Golden Eagles | 20 | 0 | 13 | 10 | 43 |

| Statistics | ECU | USM |
|---|---|---|
| First downs | 21 | 22 |
| Total yards | 338 | 404 |
| Rushing yards | 33 | 167 |
| Passing yards | 305 | 237 |
| Turnovers | 4 | 0 |
| Time of possession | 23:47 | 36:13 |

| Team | Category | Player | Statistics |
|---|---|---|---|
| East Carolina | Passing | Dominique Davis | 18/36, 305 yards, 4 TD, 3 INT |
| East Carolina | Rushing | Jonathan Williams | 13 rushes, 25 yards |
| East Carolina | Receiving | Dwayne Harris | 9 receptions, 99 yards, TD |
| Southern Miss | Passing | Austin Davis | 20/39, 237 yards, TD |
| Southern Miss | Rushing | Tracy Lampley | 13 rushes, 49 yards |
| Southern Miss | Receiving | Johdrick Morris | 5 receptions, 81 yards, TD |

=== NC State ===
| | 1 | 2 | 3 | 4 | OT | Total |
|---|---|---|---|---|---|---|
| Wolfpack | 0 | 21 | 0 | 6 | 0 | 27 |
| Pirates | 21 | 3 | 0 | 3 | 6 | 33 |

| Statistics | NCST | ECU |
|---|---|---|
| First downs | 26 | 24 |
| Total yards | 476 | 496 |
| Rushing yards | 154 | 120 |
| Passing yards | 322 | 376 |
| Turnovers | 4 | 4 |
| Time of possession | 32:31 | 27:29 |

| Team | Category | Player | Statistics |
|---|---|---|---|
| NC State | Passing | Russell Wilson | 26/52, 322 yards, TD, 3 INT |
| NC State | Rushing | Mustafa Greene | 16 rushes, 75 yards |
| NC State | Receiving | Owen Spencer | 6 receptions, 98 yards |
| East Carolina | Passing | Dominique Davis | 37/53, 376 yards, 2 TD |
| East Carolina | Rushing | Giavanni Ruffin | 15 rushes, 74 yards |
| East Carolina | Receiving | Michael Bowman | 5 receptions, 93 yards |

=== Marshall ===
| | 1 | 2 | 3 | 4 | Total |
|---|---|---|---|---|---|
| Thundering Herd | 3 | 7 | 0 | 0 | 10 |
| Pirates | 7 | 13 | 10 | 7 | 37 |

| Statistics | MRSH | ECU |
|---|---|---|
| First downs | 24 | 26 |
| Total yards | 328 | 455 |
| Rushing yards | 94 | 194 |
| Passing yards | 234 | 261 |
| Turnovers | 4 | 1 |
| Time of possession | 34:24 | 25:36 |

| Team | Category | Player | Statistics |
|---|---|---|---|
| Marshall | Passing | Brian Anderson | 27/47, 217 yards, TD, 3 INT |
| Marshall | Rushing | Tron Martinez | 6 rushes, 29 yards |
| Marshall | Receiving | Troy Evans | 6 receptions, 50 yards, TD |
| East Carolina | Passing | Dominique Davis | 23/39, 208 yards, 2 TD, INT |
| East Carolina | Rushing | Jonathan Williams | 10 rushes, 111 yards, TD |
| East Carolina | Receiving | Dwayne Harris | 5 receptions, 56 yards |

=== At UCF ===
| | 1 | 2 | 3 | 4 | Total |
|---|---|---|---|---|---|
| Pirates | 7 | 7 | 7 | 14 | 35 |
| Knights | 14 | 14 | 7 | 14 | 49 |

| Statistics | ECU | UCF |
|---|---|---|
| First downs | 21 | 21 |
| Total yards | 421 | 424 |
| Rushing yards | 111 | 265 |
| Passing yards | 310 | 159 |
| Turnovers | 1 | 1 |
| Time of possession | 29:52 | 30:08 |

| Team | Category | Player | Statistics |
|---|---|---|---|
| East Carolina | Passing | Dominique Davis | 39/54, 310 yards, 3 TD, INT |
| East Carolina | Rushing | Giavanni Ruffin | 11 rushes, 63 yards |
| East Carolina | Receiving | Dwayne Harris | 9 receptions, 146 yards, TD |
| UCF | Passing | Jeff Godfrey | 8/12, 159 yards, 2 TD |
| UCF | Rushing | Ronnie Weaver Jr. | 30 rushes, 180 yards, 2 TD |
| UCF | Receiving | Brian Watters | 2 receptions, 55 yards |

=== Navy ===
| | 1 | 2 | 3 | 4 | Total |
|---|---|---|---|---|---|
| Midshipmen | 14 | 14 | 27 | 21 | 76 |
| Pirates | 14 | 7 | 7 | 7 | 35 |

| Statistics | NAVY | ECU |
|---|---|---|
| First downs | 25 | 28 |
| Total yards | 596 | 567 |
| Rushing yards | 521 | 154 |
| Passing yards | 75 | 413 |
| Turnovers | 1 | 4 |
| Time of possession | 34:43 | 25:17 |

| Team | Category | Player | Statistics |
|---|---|---|---|
| Navy | Passing | Ricky Dobbs | 6/8, 75 yards, 2 TD |
| Navy | Rushing | Alexander Teich | 14 rushes, 157 yards, TD |
| Navy | Receiving | Aaron Santiago | 2 receptions, 33 yards, TD |
| East Carolina | Passing | Dominique Davis | 43/65, 413 yards, 5 TD |
| East Carolina | Rushing | Jonathan Williams | 12 rushes, 94 yards |
| East Carolina | Receiving | Lance Lewis | 9 receptions, 118 yards, 2 TD |

=== At UAB ===
| | 1 | 2 | 3 | 4 | Total |
|---|---|---|---|---|---|
| Pirates | 7 | 17 | 3 | 27 | 54 |
| Blazers | 7 | 14 | 14 | 7 | 42 |

| Statistics | ECU | UAB |
|---|---|---|
| First downs | 25 | 28 |
| Total yards | 492 | 545 |
| Rushing yards | 128 | 127 |
| Passing yards | 364 | 418 |
| Turnovers | 0 | 2 |
| Time of possession | 26:43 | 32:33 |

| Team | Category | Player | Statistics |
|---|---|---|---|
| East Carolina | Passing | Dominique Davis | 26/41, 331 yards, 5 TD |
| East Carolina | Rushing | Jonathan Williams | 14 rushes, 82 yards, TD |
| East Carolina | Receiving | Jonathan Williams | 5 receptions, 115 yards, TD |
| UAB | Passing | Bryan Ellis | 31/49, 418 yards, 5 TD, INT |
| UAB | Rushing | Pat Shed | 18 rushes, 81 yards |
| UAB | Receiving | Mike Jones | 8 receptions, 110 yards |

=== At Rice ===
| | 1 | 2 | 3 | 4 | Total |
|---|---|---|---|---|---|
| Pirates | 7 | 21 | 3 | 7 | 38 |
| Owls | 14 | 20 | 14 | 14 | 62 |

| Statistics | ECU | RICE |
|---|---|---|
| First downs | 21 | 25 |
| Total yards | 454 | 639 |
| Rushing yards | 146 | 410 |
| Passing yards | 308 | 229 |
| Turnovers | 3 | 1 |
| Time of possession | 21:14 | 38:46 |

| Team | Category | Player | Statistics |
|---|---|---|---|
| East Carolina | Passing | Dominique Davis | 21/39, 308 yards, 3 TD, 2 INT |
| East Carolina | Rushing | Jonathan Williams | 17 rushes, 100 yards, TD |
| East Carolina | Receiving | Lance Lewis | 7 receptions, 126 yards, TD |
| Rice | Passing | Taylor McHargue | 11/15, 220 yards, 3 TD |
| Rice | Rushing | Jeremy Eddington | 16 rushes, 143 yards, 4 TD |
| Rice | Receiving | Vance McDonald | 5 receptions, 88 yards, TD |

=== SMU ===
| | 1 | 2 | 3 | 4 | OT | Total |
|---|---|---|---|---|---|---|
| Mustangs | 0 | 10 | 21 | 7 | 7 | 45 |
| Pirates | 14 | 0 | 3 | 21 | 0 | 38 |

| Statistics | SMU | ECU |
|---|---|---|
| First downs | 21 | 25 |
| Total yards | 450 | 452 |
| Rushing yards | 119 | 138 |
| Passing yards | 331 | 314 |
| Turnovers | 1 | 2 |
| Time of possession | 32:32 | 27:28 |

| Team | Category | Player | Statistics |
|---|---|---|---|
| SMU | Passing | Kyle Padron | 21/34, 331 yards, 3 TD |
| SMU | Rushing | Zach Line | 30 rushes, 123 yards, 2 TD |
| SMU | Receiving | Aldrick Robinson | 5 receptions, 129 yards, TD |
| East Carolina | Passing | Dominique Davis | 33/45, 314 yards, 2 TD, INT |
| East Carolina | Rushing | Jonathan Lewis | 14 rushes, 87 yards, 2 TD |
| East Carolina | Receiving | Lance Lewis | 8 receptions, 154 yards, 2 TD |

=== Vs. Maryland (Military Bowl) ===
| | 1 | 2 | 3 | 4 | Total |
|---|---|---|---|---|---|
| Pirates | 0 | 3 | 10 | 7 | 20 |
| Terrapins | 6 | 10 | 21 | 14 | 51 |

| Statistics | ECU | MD |
|---|---|---|
| First downs | 19 | 18 |
| Total yards | 343 | 478 |
| Rushing yards | 32 | 297 |
| Passing yards | 311 | 181 |
| Turnovers | 4 | 2 |
| Time of possession | 30:13 | 29:47 |

| Team | Category | Player | Statistics |
|---|---|---|---|
| East Carolina | Passing | Dominique Davis | 35/57, 268 yards, TD, 2 INT |
| East Carolina | Rushing | Giavanni Ruffin | 11 rushes, 27 yards |
| East Carolina | Receiving | Lance Lewis | 11 receptions, 137 yards, TD |
| Maryland | Passing | Danny O'Brien | 13/22, 181 yards, TD, 2 INT |
| Maryland | Rushing | Da'Rel Scott | 13 rushes, 200 yards, 2 TD |
| Maryland | Receiving | Davin Meggett | 2 receptions, 52 yards |

== Postseason ==
=== NFL draft picks ===
- Dwayne Harris - Round 6: 11th (176th overall) - Dallas Cowboys

=== Awards ===
- Conference USA Most Valuable Player: Dwayne Harris, Sr. WR
- Conference USA Newcomer-of-the-Year: Dominique Davis, Jr. QB
- Rivals.com Conference USA Most Valuable Player: - Dominique Davis, Jr. QB
- Rivals.com Conference USA Offensive Most Valuable Player: - Dominique Davis, Jr. QB

=== Honors ===
==== Weekly Honors ====
- Sept. 6 Conference USA Offensive Player-of-the-Week: Dominique Davis, Jr. QB
- Oct. 18 Conference USA Offensive Player-of-the-Week: Dominique Davis, Jr. QB

==== Teams ====
- Rivals.com First Team All-Conference USA
  - Dominique Davis, Jr. QB
  - Dwayne Harris, Sr. WR
- Rivals.com Second Team All-Conference USA
  - Lance Lewis, Jr. WR
  - Willie Smith, Sr. OL
  - Emanuel Davis, Jr. DB
  - Michael Barbour, Jr. K

1st Team All C-USA
- Willie Smith, Sr. OL
- Dwayne Harris, Sr. WR
- Dwayne Harris, Sr. PR

2nd Team All C-USA
- Lance Lewis, Jr. WR
- Emanuel Davis, Jr. DB
- Michael Barbour, Jr. K

C-USA Team Honorable Mentions
- Dominique Davis, Jr. QB
- Jonathan Williams, Sr. RB
- Josh Smith, Sr. DL
- Dustin Lineback, Sr. LB

C-USA All Freshman Team
- Grant Harner, OL

C-USA All Academic Team
- Matt Milner, RS-Fr. DE
