= John McGeever =

American football player (1939–2022)

No. 47
- Position: Cornerback

Personal information
- Born: February 14, 1939; Bogalusa, Louisiana, U.S.
- Died: December 5, 2022 (aged 83); Vestavia Hills, Alabama, U.S.
- Listed height: 6 ft 1 in (1.85 m)
- Listed weight: 195 lb (88 kg)

Career information
- High school: John Carroll Catholic (Birmingham, Alabama)
- College: Auburn
- NFL draft: 1962: 6th round, 83rd overall pick
- AFL draft: 1962: 7th round, 50th overall pick

Career history
- Denver Broncos (1962-1965); Miami Dolphins (1966); San Diego Chargers (1967)*
- * Offseason or practice squad member only

Career AFL statistics
- Interceptions: 11
- Touchdowns: 1
- Sacks: 2
- Stats at Pro Football Reference

John McGeever (February 14, 1939 – December 5, 2022) was an American professional football player who was a cornerback in the American Football League (AFL).

McGeever was drafted in the 7th round by the Denver Broncos in the 1962 AFL draft after playing college football for the Auburn University. From 1962 to 1965, McGeever played for the Broncos, then for the Miami Dolphins in 1966.

McGeever died on December 5, 2022, at the age of 83.
