= James Willis (American football) =

American football player and coach (born 1972)

No. 56, 50, 95
- Position: Linebacker

Personal information
- Born: September 2, 1972 (age 54); Huntsville, Alabama, U.S.
- Listed height: 6 ft 2 in (1.88 m)
- Listed weight: 237 lb (108 kg)

Career information
- High school: Johnson (Huntsville)
- College: Auburn
- NFL draft: 1993: 5th round, 119th overall pick

Career history

Playing
- Green Bay Packers (1993–1995); Philadelphia Eagles (1995–1998); Seattle Seahawks (1999); Birmingham Thunderbolts (2001)

Coaching
- Rhode Island (2004) Linebackers; Temple (2005) Linebackers; Auburn (2006–2008) Linebackers; Alabama (2009) Associate head coach, outside linebackers; Texas Tech (2010–2011) Defensive coordinator; Louisiana (2013–2014) Defensive coordinator; New Orleans Saints (2014–2017) Defensive assistant, linebackers

Awards and highlights
- UFL champion (2011); First-team All-SEC (1992); SEC Defensive Freshman of the Year (1990)

Career NFL statistics
- Tackles: 320
- Sacks: 2.0
- Forced fumbles: 2
- Fumble recoveries: 5
- Interceptions: 4
- Stats at Pro Football Reference

James Edward Willis III (born September 2, 1972) is an American former professional football player who was a linebacker in the National Football League (NFL). He was selected by the Green Bay Packers in the fifth round of the 1993 NFL draft. He played college football for the Auburn Tigers. He played high school football at J.O. Johnson High School in Huntsville, Alabama.

Willis also played for the Philadelphia Eagles, Seattle Seahawks, and Birmingham Thunderbolts of the now defunct XFL. After his playing career, he coached in the NCAA and in the NFL

== Playing career ==
Willis was selected in the fifth round (119th overall) by the Green Bay Packers in the 1993 NFL draft. Willis shares the record for the longest interception return in Philadelphia Eagles history after scoring on a 104-yard interception against the Dallas Cowboys in 1996; after intercepting Troy Aikman four yards into the end zone, Willis returned the pick 14 yards before lateraling to Troy Vincent, who returned the remainder 90 yards for the score.

== Coaching career ==
Upon the dissolution of the XFL, Willis decided to retire as a player and returned to Auburn to work towards completing his college degree. He became a student assistant for the Auburn Tigers football team in 2001 and became a defensive graduate assistant in 2003 under defensive coordinator Gene Chizik.

=== Rhode Island Rams ===
In 2004, Willis took his first coaching job as the linebackers coach of the Rhode Island Rams.

=== Temple Owls ===
In 2005, Willis was hired for the same position by Temple University.

=== Auburn Tigers ===
In 2006, Auburn head coach Tommy Tuberville hired Willis to return to his alma mater as the linebackers coach under new defensive coordinator Will Muschamp. When Muschamp left for Texas, his replacement Paul Rhoads kept Willis on staff. When coach Tuberville resigned from Auburn in 2008, the entire staff was initially released by new head coach Gene Chizik, however on December 26, 2008, Willis was retained to again coach linebackers.

=== Alabama Crimson Tide ===
Although initially thought to return to Auburn, Willis was hired by Alabama's head coach Nick Saban to be the Crimson Tide's associate head coach and outside linebackers coach on January 21, 2009. During his one season with Alabama, the Crimson Tide defeated the Texas Longhorns in the 2010 BCS National Championship Game.

=== Texas Tech Red Raiders ===
On January 13, 2010, Willis agreed to join head coach Tommy Tuberville to serve as the new defensive coordinator for the Texas Tech Red Raiders football team. Prior to the 2011 TicketCity Bowl, Willis allegedly left the program to pursue other career opportunities after a domestic disturbance call at his home.

=== Louisiana Ragin' Cajuns ===
On February 7, 2013, Willis agreed to become the new defensive coordinator for the Ragin Cajuns.

=== New Orleans Saints ===
On February 11, 2015, it was reported that Willis left the Ragin' Cajuns to become a defensive assistant/linebackers coach for the Saints. He was fired from the Saints on January 5, 2017

=== Northlake Christian ===
In 2019 it was announced that James would be the head football coach at Northlake Christian high school.
