= 2010 Military Bowl =

2010 Military Bowl presented by Northrop Grumman
- 3rd Military Bowl
East Carolina Pirates	Maryland Terrapins
(6–6)	(8–4)
C-USA	ACC
20	51
Head coach: Ruffin McNeill	Head coach: Ralph Friedgen
	1	2	3	4	Total
East Carolina	0	3	10	7	20
Maryland	6	10	21	14	51
- Date: December 29, 2010
- Season: 2010
- Stadium: RFK Stadium
- Location: Washington, D.C.
- MVP: RB Da'Rel Scott, Maryland
- Favorite: Maryland by 7
- Referee: John McDaid (Big East)
- Attendance: 38,062
- Payout: US$1 million

United States TV coverage
- Network: ESPN
- Announcers: Pam Ward, Danny Kanell and Quint Kessenich

The 2010 Military Bowl was the third edition of the college football bowl game previously called the EagleBank Bowl. It was played as scheduled at RFK Stadium in Washington, D.C., on December 29, 2010, at 2:30 p.m. (ET), and telecast on ESPN.

In April 2010, organizers announced that the NCAA had granted a four-year extension of the game's bowl certification. Additionally, the bowl received sponsorship from Northrop Grumman, and this edition was officially known as the 2010 Military Bowl presented by Northrop Grumman.

== Teams ==
The bowl organizers selected the Maryland Terrapins from the Atlantic Coast Conference and the East Carolina Pirates from Conference USA. This is the first ever meeting between the two programs.

=== East Carolina Pirates ===
The bowl selected the 6–6 East Carolina Pirates to serve as the Conference USA representative. Coming off the 2009 season in which they were the Conference USA Champions and its representative in the Liberty Bowl the Pirates struggled a bit in 2010, losing four of their last five games. It was ECU's first appearance in the Military Bowl. The appearance marks their unprecedented fifth straight bowl appearance, its seventh since 2000 and 17th overall in program history.

=== Maryland Terrapins ===
Coming off a disappointing 2–10 season in 2009 Maryland returns to a bowl game to face East Carolina. Head coach Ralph Friedgen was named the ACC's Coach of the Year for the turnaround, which was the second-best in the FBS this year, and this game marked his final game as the head coach of Maryland. Quarterback Danny O’Brien was named the league's Rookie of the Year. The Terps were one win away from playing in the ACC title game but settled for the ACC's 8th bowl tie-in selection. Maryland has won four of its past five bowl games and has outscored its last four bowl opponents 151–73. This is their first appearance in the Military Bowl.

=== Contingency for Army ===
Army had a contingency agreement with the game organizers that would have allowed the Black Knights to go to the game if either the ACC or Conference USA was unable to send a team to the bowl game. However, this tie-in would only have become applicable if the Armed Forces Bowl failed to select Army first. This scenario was taken off the table on November 30, when the Armed Forces Bowl extended a bid to Army.

== Game Summary ==
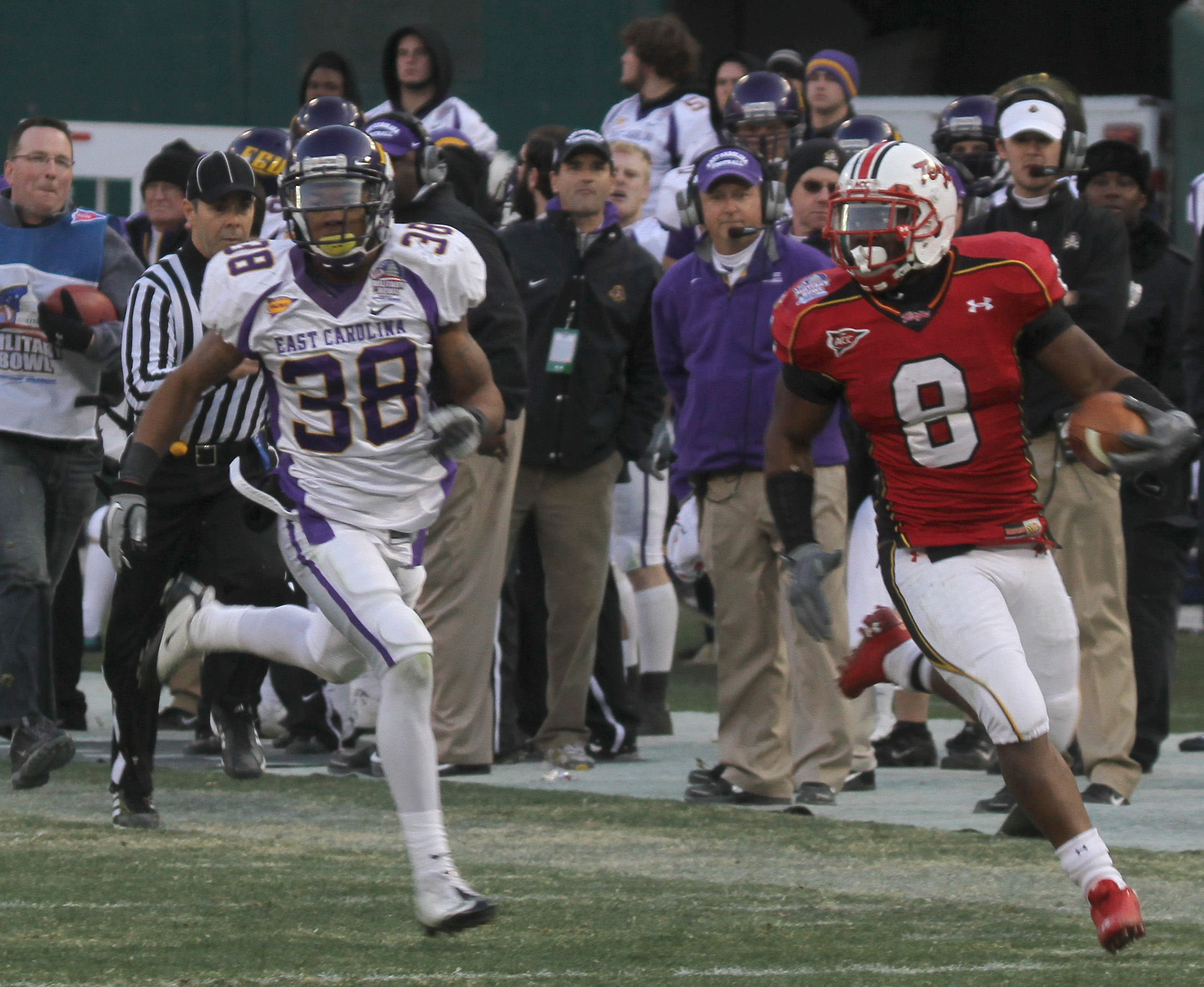
Davin Meggett (right) carrying the ball for Maryland during the 2010 Military Bowl

=== Scoring ===
Scoring Play	Score
1st Quarter
MD - Danny O'Brien 45-yard pass to Kevin Dorsey (Travis Baltz kick blocked), 10:35	MD 6-0
2nd Quarter
MD - Travis Baltz 23 yard kick, 9:46	MD 9-0
EC - Michael Barbour 37 yard kick, 6:08	MD 9-3
MD - D.J. Adams 1-yard run (Travis Baltz kick), 2:57	MD 16-3
3rd Quarter
MD - D.J. Adams 1-yard run (Travis Baltz kick), 13:13	MD 23-3
EC - Dominique Davis 20-yard pass Lance Lewis (Michael Barbour kick), 9:51	MD 23-10
MD - D.J. Adams 1-yard run (Travis Baltz kick), 4:32	MD 30-10
EC - Michael Barbour 31 yard kick, 1:18	MD 30-13
MD - Da'Rel Scott 61-yard run (Travis Baltz kick), 1:00	MD 37-13
4th Quarter
MD - Da'Rel Scott 91-yard run (Travis Baltz kick), 11:20	MD 44-13
MD - D.J. Adams 4-yard run (Travis Baltz kick), 4:41	MD 51-13
EC - Brad Wornick pass 14 yard to Justin Jones (Michael Barbour kick), 1:43	MD 51-20

=== Statistics ===
Statistics	E. Carolina	Maryland
First downs	19	18
Total offense, plays-yards	83-343	60-478
Rushes-yards (net)	21-32	38-297
Passes, Comp-Att-Yds	39-62-311	13-22-181
Fumbles-Interceptions	2-2	0-2
Time of Possession	30:13	29:47
