= Janet Emerson Bashen =

American businesswoman

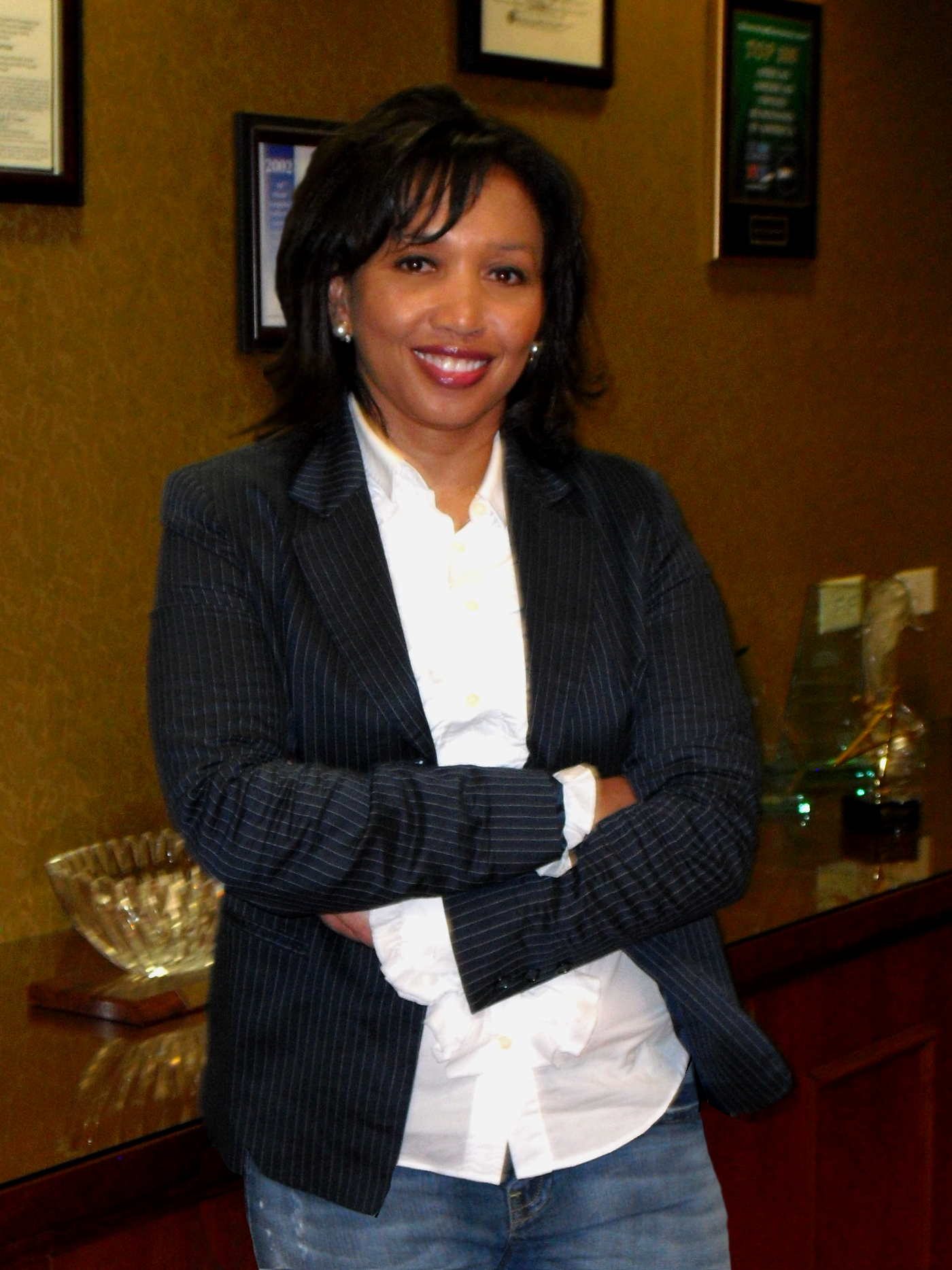
- Born: Janet Rita Emerson; February 12, 1957 (age 69); Mansfield, Ohio, U.S.
- Education: University of Houston (BS), Tulane Law School (MJ-LEL), The University of Southern California (Doctorate)
- Occupations: Software inventor, businesswoman
- Employer: Bashen Corporation
- Known for: First African American woman to patent a web-based EEO software (Nalikah, formerly known as LinkLine)
- Spouses: Ruffus Williams (m. 1979; div. 1988) George Steven Bashen (m. 1988)
- Children: 2

Janet Rita Bashen (née Emerson; born February 12, 1957) is an American entrepreneur, business consultant, and software inventor. Bashen is best known for patenting a web-based EEO software application, LinkLine, now known as Nalikah, to assist with equal employment opportunity investigations and claims tracking. Bashen is regarded as the first African American woman to obtain a web-based software patent.

== Personal life ==
Janet Rita Emerson was born on February 12, 1957, in Mansfield, Ohio to James Lucker Emerson Sr., a garbage collector, and Ola Mae Emerson, a nurse. Emerson's family moved to Huntsville, Alabama, where Emerson went to a segregated elementary school until the fifth grade when she entered Fifth Avenue School, a previously segregated school in Huntsville, Alabama.

She married George Steven Bashen in 1988. They have two children.

== Career ==
Bashen attended Alabama A&M a Historical Black College and University but did not graduate. Emerson enrolled in the University of Houston and graduated with a degree in Legal Studies and Government. Dr. Bashen attended Harvard University. Bashen is also a graduate of Tulane Law School. Bashen received a doctorate from USC's Suzanne Dworak-Peck School of Social Work.

After graduating from the University of Houston, Bashen worked for an insurance company handling claims related to Equal Employment Opportunities. Bashen would later receive a $5,000 loan from her mother and in 1994, began her own company, Bashen Corporation, to investigate discrimination claims filed by employees.

As her company grew, Bashen became aware of the need for better ways of storing and accessing the data related to claims. With her cousin, Donnie Moore, a Tufts University computer science graduate, Bashen began developing a software. This was the genesis for the software Nalikah, previously known as LinkLine. In January 2006, Bashen was awarded a Patent No. 6,985,922, B1, making her the first African-American woman to earn a web-based software patent.

=== Congressional testimony ===
In May 2000, Bashen testified before the U.S. House of Representatives that civil rights and employee misconduct investigations should be exempt from the Fair Credit Reporting Act.
