= Ronald Steele =

American basketball player

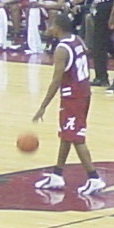
- Steele with the Alabama Crimson Tide in 2004

Personal information
- Born: April 22, 1986 (age 40) Birmingham, Alabama, U.S.
- Listed height: 6 ft 3 in (1.91 m)
- Listed weight: 185 lb (84 kg)

Career information
- High school: John Carroll Catholic (Birmingham, Alabama)
- College: Alabama (2004–2009)
- NBA draft: 2009: undrafted
- Playing career: 2009–2014
- Position: Point guard

Career history
- 2009–2011: Bnei Hasharon
- 2011–2012: Tofaş
- 2012–2013: Sutor Montegranaro
- 2013: Hapoel Jerusalem
- 2013–2014: PMS Torino

Career highlights
- First-team All-SEC (2006); Second-team Parade All-American (2004); 2× Alabama Mr. Basketball (2003, 2004)

Ronald Lee Steele Jr. (born April 22, 1986) is an American former professional basketball player. He played college basketball for the University of Alabama.

== High school ==
Ronald Steele was born in Birmingham, Alabama. He attended John Carroll Catholic High School in Birmingham and led them to an undefeated 36–0 record in his junior season. He was named "Mr. Basketball" in the state of Alabama in each of his junior and senior seasons. He was the first junior ever to receive the title.

== College ==
Steele raised his NBA draft profile during his sophomore year, 2005–06. In August 2006, Steele attended a Michael Jordan basketball camp. After giving him tips and "a lot of compliments," Jordan invited Steele to play in a two-on-two pickup game.

In his junior season, Steele led his team to a great start and a top 10 ranking. However, Steele was injured halfway through the season. Knee tendinitis and severe ankle sprains prevented him from competing at top form.

Steele underwent arthroscopic surgery in the 2007 offseason to repair tendinitis in both knees. He was expected to be 100% when the 2007–08 regular season began. However, Alabama announced on September 17, 2007, that Steele would take a medical redshirt his senior season instead.

Steele declared himself eligible for the 2008 NBA draft but did not hire an agent, leaving the possibility open of returning to college. After reiterating he would leave his options open, he decided to return for his senior year.

He returned briefly for the 2008–09 season. Ten days after his final game, on January 21, 2009, Steele, who had been suffering from plantar fasciitis, announced that he would forgo the rest of the 2008–09 season, thus effectively ending his college career. In his final season he averaged 12.9 points, 3.4 rebounds, 3.7 assists and 0.9 steals per game in 15 games. He made a dismal 36.6% of his field goal attempts, but was making (at that time) a team-leading 38% three-pointers.

== Pro career ==
Prior to 2009–10 season Steele has signed for Israeli club Bnei Hasharon.After a season in which he averaged 9.8 points in 22.5 minutes per game. Steele had his contract extended with the club for another season. In July 2011 he signed with Tofaş Bursa for one season.

== Personal life ==
Ronald is married to Artesha Steele. Steele's younger brother, Andrew, who also graduated from John Carroll Catholic High School, signed to play for Alabama during the 2008–09 season. His father, Ronald Sr., graduated as a football player from Southern University, and played pro football with the Birmingham Vulcans.

== Awards ==
- 2003 Alabama High School "Mr. Basketball"
- 2003 High School 6A Player of the Year
- 2003 High School 6A Finals MVP
- 2004 Alabama High School "Mr. Basketball"
- 2004 High School 6A Player of the Year
- 2006 AP All-SEC First Team
- 2007 Preseason AP All-American
