= John Carroll Catholic High School (Alabama) =

Location
- 300 Lakeshore Parkway; Birmingham, Alabama 35209; United States
- Coordinates: 33°26′38″N 86°49′57″W

Information
- Type: Private, Coeducational
- Motto: Pro Deo et Patria (For God and Country)
- Religious affiliation: Roman Catholic
- Established: 1946 (80 years ago)
- CEEB code: 010370
- President: Father Jon Chalmers
- Principal: Ronald Steele
- Teaching staff: 42.6 (on an FTE basis)
- Grades: 9–12
- Enrollment: 488 (2020–2021)
- Student to teacher ratio: 11.5:1
- Hours in school day: 8
- Colors: Green and white
- Slogan: Where Faith and Reason Flourish
- Team name: Cavaliers
- Accreditation: Southern Association of Colleges and Schools
- Publication: Looking Glass (Literary Magazine)
- Newspaper: Cavalier
- Yearbook: Green Leaves
- Affiliation: National Catholic Educational Association
- Website: www.jcchs.org

John Carroll Catholic High School is a co-educational private school in Birmingham, Alabama, United States and is one of six Catholic high schools serving the Roman Catholic Diocese of Birmingham in Alabama.

== Background ==
One of the first projects envisioned by Archbishop Thomas J. Toolen, when he was assigned to the former Mobile-Birmingham Diocese in 1927, was the establishment of a Catholic high school in this area. However, John Carroll Catholic High School would still be a dream if it were not for the leadership and dedication of a Birmingham layman, Mr. John Carroll. Mr. Carroll, at a testimonial dinner for the Archbishop, began an organization - The Friends of Catholic Education - to raise funds for a Catholic high school in Birmingham. The memory of Mr. Carroll's dedication lives on in the name of the school, John Carroll Catholic.

The construction of John Carroll Catholic High School on Highland Avenue began in November 1946. Ten months later, on September 8, 1947, the main educational unit was opened. In 1951 the Bishop Toolen Center, located at the east end of the campus, was completed.

The Center housed the gymnasium-auditorium, physical educational facilities and the fine arts facilities. The cafeteria and bookstore were added in 1957, followed a year later by the addition of the east wing, which housed classroom facilities. In 1957 property on Montclair Road was cleared for athletics with the completion of the athletic complex in 1961, including the football field, baseball field, running track and club house. Two years later, the second phase was completed, including the erection of bleachers, lights for the football field and a concession stand. In September 1981, the Activity Center, formerly the Benedictine Convent, was opened, which included a faculty facility, art room and guidance offices.

On December 9, 1989, Bishop Raymond Boland held a press conference to announce plans for the construction of a new John Carroll Catholic High School; ground breaking ceremonies and construction began April 8, 1990. The campus, including all academic, fine arts and athletic facilities, is a tribute to the generosity of the Bruno Family and the entire Birmingham community.

John Carroll Catholic moved to the new site on Lakeshore Parkway and began school there in August 1992. The dedication of the new school was held by then Bishop Raymond Boland on September 4, 1992.

The class ring is green onyx and was adopted in 1964.

The school hosted flying disc competitions at the 2022 World Games.

== Notable alumni ==
- John McGeever (1958) NFL player for the Denver Broncos and Miami Dolphins
- Robert J. Natter (1963) US Navy Admiral, Commander US Atlantic Fleet
- Eric F. Wieschaus (1965) Winner of the 1995 Nobel Prize for Medicine
- William A. Bell (1967) Mayor of Birmingham, Alabama
- Pat Sullivan (1968) Winner of the 1971 Heisman Trophy, NFL Atlanta Falcons and Washington Redskins
- Tom Banks (1968) All-Pro NFL player for the St. Louis Cardinals
- Joseph Marino (1971) Former papal nuncio and president of the Pontifical Ecclesiastical Academy
- Wes Hopkins (1979) All-Pro NFL player for the Philadelphia Eagles
- Trace Armstrong (1984) All-Pro NFL player listed on the 100 Greatest Chicago Bears of All Time
- Alexander Shunnarah (1984) Personal injury lawyer
- T.J. Slaughter (1996) NFL player
- Andre Holland (1997) Actor, 3x Oscar winner
- Marcus Brimage (2003) Professional Mixed Martial Artist with the UFC
- DeMarre Carroll (2004) Former NBA player and current NBA assistant coach
- Ronald Steele (2004) University of Alabama basketball player, Preseason AP All-American
- Harry Miree (2007) Musician and YouTuber with over 120K subscribers
- DeMarcus Covington (2007) NFL defensive line coach for the Green Bay Packers; Super Bowl champion
