= J.O. Johnson High School =

Coordinates: 34°47′57.4″N 86°36′33.56″W

Location
- 6201 Pueblo Drive; Huntsville, Madison County, Alabama 35810; United States

Information
- Type: Public
- Motto: Sum Quae Credo ("I am what I believe I am.")
- Established: 1972
- Closed: 2016
- School district: Huntsville City Schools
- Principal: Roderick Tomlin (acting)
- Grades: 9-12
- Campus: Suburban (42 acres)
- Colors: Blue and gold
- Athletics: AHSAA Class 5A
- Sports: Basketball, Football, Wrestling, Track and Field, Cheer, Dance, Soccer, Baseball, Softball, and Volleyball
- Mascot: Jaguars
- Accreditation: Southern Association of Colleges and Schools
- Newspaper: Jaguar Journal
- Yearbook: Harmony

James Oliver Johnson High School, more commonly referred to as J.O. Johnson High School or J.O.J., was a public high school located in the northwest area of Huntsville, Alabama. The school served grades 9 through 12. It was home to an International Education Magnet Program, and the school also featured a Marine JROTC program. It was established in 1972 and closed in 2016.

== History ==
The school was named for former Huntsville educator James Oliver Johnson, who served as a Brigadier General in the United States Army. Johnson commanded one of the first all black combat battalion in WW II, leading to the integration and racial diversity of the US Army. Johnson led men who constructed airplane infrastructure on the ground in North Africa and Mediterranean region, for Army Air Forces including the Tuskegee Airmen.

True to the legacy of its namesake, JO Johnson was the first new High School in Huntsville, Alabama built as a racially integrated high school. Black and White Students had no strife, and became the model High School throughout the state shortly after the Civil Rights era.

The road leading to the campus, Cecil Fain Drive, was named after another long term educator. J.O.J. opened in 1972 at 6201 Pueblo Drive, Huntsville, Alabama, to ease the overcrowding of Lee High School and to meet the needs of an area of Huntsville that had just begun to grow in population. Its primary feeder schools were the Academy for Science and Foreign Language, Edward H. White Middle School, and Davis Hills Middle School.

In August 2012, the Huntsville City Schools announced plans to build a new school, and retain the name JO Johnson.

In 2013, it was announced the school would receive a new building, but retain its name in 2016. The latest statement is that the Johnson name will not transfer to the new school (unlike the 4 other high schools rebuilt over the years) The school name will close and be changed to Mae Jemison High School and for the middle school that will share the campus, Ronald McNair Junior High School. These school names are named after NASA Astronauts Mae Jemison and the late Ronald McNair.

On Thursday May 26, 2016, Johnson held its 42nd and final Commencement Exercises at the Von Braun Center Arena.

In 2018, an Emmy Awards-nominated documentary, Wrestle, was released that follows four members – Jailen Young, Jaquan Rhodes, Jamario Rowe, and Matthew Teague Berres – of the high school wrestling team and their coach, Chris Scribner, to the state championship.

== Notable alumni ==
- Reginald "Reg" E. Cathey (1958–2018), actor on House of Cards (2013–2016), Fantastic Four (2015), Square One TV (1987–1994), Oz (2000–2003) The Wire (2002–2008), Se7en (1995), The Machinist (2004) and American Psycho (2000)
- Sharon Johnson Coleman, United States District Judge (United States District Court for the Northern District of Illinois)
- Bobby Cattage, NBA player, Utah Jazz and New Jersey Nets
- Donnie Humphrey (1961–2014), NFL player, Green Bay Packers
- Chris Martin, NFL player, New Orleans Saints, Minnesota Vikings, Kansas City Chiefs, and Los Angeles Rams
- Joey Kent, NFL player, Tennessee Oilers/Titans, Indianapolis Colts and Minnesota Vikings
- Rashad Moore, NFL player, Seattle Seahawks, Oakland Raiders, New York Jets, New England Patriots, and Atlanta Falcons
- James Willis, NFL player, Green Bay Packers, Philadelphia Eagles, and Seattle Seahawks; XFL player, Birmingham Thunderbolts
- Janet Emerson Bashen, Inventor of LinkLine

== Notable faculty ==
=== Former Faculty ===
- Laura Hall (D – District 19), former Biology teacher, member of the Alabama House of Representatives
