= Jemison High School (Huntsville, Alabama) =

Location
- 5000 Pulaski Pike; Huntsville, Alabama 35810; United States; 34°47′13″N 86°36′58″W

Information
- Type: Public
- Established: August 2, 2016; 10 years ago
- School district: Huntsville City Schools
- CEEB code: 011550
- Principal: Demetris Harris-Leverette
- Teaching staff: 31.20 (on an FTE basis)
- Grades: 9-12
- Student to teacher ratio: 21.96
- Colors: Blue and gold
- Team name: Jaguars
- Website: www.huntsvillecityschools.org/o/jhs

Jemison High School is a public high school in Huntsville, Alabama, United States. It is named for Mae Jemison, a native of nearby Decatur, Alabama who was the first African-American female astronaut.

The school is built on the same campus as McNair Junior High School, which is named for the late Ronald McNair, the second African-American astronaut in space, who was killed in the explosion of the space shuttle Challenger. Jemison High School is a 6A school.

The school contains a magnet program called the College Academy which works alongside The University of Alabama in Huntsville to provide students with college credit throughout high school. The school's mascot is the Jaguars.

Jemison High School replaced J.O. Johnson High School, which closed its doors at the end of the 2015–16 school year.

== Administration ==
- Principal: Demetris Harris-Leverette, PhD
- Assistant Principal: Patrick Holder
- Dean of Students: Kelvis White
- College Academy Dean: Patrick Holder

== College Academy ==
The College Academy is a magnet program that allows students to obtain up to 60 college credit hours as a student in high school. Partnered with the University of Alabama in Huntsville, the students have the opportunity to attend classes on campus. This allows students to be prepared for college and get a head start on their major.

As an incentive, all students that graduate from the College Academy will be able to keep any scholarship that they receive for the next 4 years. Students who choose to continue at University of Alabama in Huntsville will have a chance to use that scholarship toward a master's degree. If the students attend somewhere else, there is no guarantee of a scholarship.

== See also ==
- List of high schools in Alabama
