= Charlie Taaffe =

American gridiron football player and coach (1950–2019)

Biographical details
- Born: April 20, 1950; Albany, New York, U.S.
- Died: October 29, 2019 (aged 69); Orlando, Florida, U.S.

Playing career
- 1969: Clemson
- 1970–1972: Siena
- Position: Quarterback

Coaching career (HC unless noted)
- 1973: Albany (QB/RB)
- 1974: Georgia Tech (GA: WR)
- 1975: NC State (GA: OB)
- 1976–1980: Virginia (QB/RB/LB/ST)
- 1981–1983: Army (QB/RB)
- 1984–1986: Army (OC)
- 1987–1996: The Citadel
- 1997–1998: Montreal Alouettes (OC)
- 1999–2000: Montreal Alouettes
- 2001–2005: Maryland (OC)
- 2006: Pittsburgh (OC)
- 2007–2008: Hamilton Tiger-Cats
- 2009–2014: UCF (OC)

Head coaching record
- Overall: 55–47–1 (college); 29–35 (CFL)

Accomplishments and honors

Championships
- 1 SoCon (1992)

Awards
- Eddie Robinson Award (1992); 2× Annis Stukus Award (1999–2000)

Charlie Taaffe (April 20, 1950 – October 29, 2019) was an American gridiron football coach who was the head football coach at The Citadel from 1987 to 1996. He is the winningest head coach in the school's history. He was also the head coach of the Canadian Football League's Montreal Alouettes (1999 to 2000) and Hamilton Tiger-Cats (2007 to 2008).

== Coaching career ==
After 4 years as a college quarterback (1 with Clemson, then 3 with Siena College) Taaffe's coaching career began in 1973 as an Offensive Backfield coach at Albany. He then served two years as a Graduate Assistant at Georgia Tech (Wide Receivers) and North Carolina State (Offensive Backs). From 1976 to 1980 he was an assistant coach at Virginia, working with the offensive backfield, linebackers, and special teams. From 1981 to 1983 he was a quarterbacks coach and offensive backfield coach at the U.S. Military Academy. From 1984 until 1986 Taaffe served a successful stint as an Army's offensive coordinator. In his three seasons as offensive coordinator, the Cadets had a combined record of 23–13.

=== The Citadel ===
In 1987, Taaffe was hired as head football coach at The Citadel. In 1992, he coached what was arguably the best in The Citadel's history, finishing 11–2 and was the top ranked team at the end of the regular season. The team however lost to Youngstown State in the quarterfinals. For his efforts, Taaffe won the Eddie Robinson Award. In 10 seasons at The Citadel, his overall record was 55–47–1, including six seasons of .500 or better and is the school's winningest head coach. Taaffe also led the Bulldogs to a 6–5 record against Division I-A teams, with wins against Arkansas, Army, Navy, and South He was fired from the school and was hired in May 1997 with the Montreal Alouettes of the Canadian Football League.

=== Montreal Alouettes ===
Taaffe was offensive coordinator of the CFL's Montreal Alouettes from 1997 to 1998, helping the Als to a 25–10–1 record. In 1999, he became the team's head coach. With Taaffe at the helm, the Alouettes had a combined 25–14 record, including an appearance in the 2000 Grey Cup. For his efforts in 1999 and 2000, Taaffe won the Annis Stukus Trophy as the CFL's Coach of the Year, making him only the second Montreal coach to win the award (Marv Levy being the first in 1974) and the first coach in CFL history to earn the honor in each of his first two seasons.

While in Montreal, Taaffe's offenses put up some impressive numbers. In 2000, the Alouettes broke the CFL's all-time record for points in a regular season as they posted 594. Taaffe helped quarterback Anthony Calvillo to a 112.9 passer rating in 2000. Running back Mike Pringle also excelled in Taaffe's system, rushing for a league-best 1,656 yards in 1999.

=== Maryland ===
In 2001 Taaffe became Maryland's offensive coordinator/quarterbacks coach. In his first year, Taaffe was able to steer Maryland to 390 points (a then school record) and an average of 35.5 points per game. The Terps' 439.7 yards of total offense per game were the best in the ACC. Taaffe's option offense helped the team to an average of 220.7 yards per game on the ground, second-best in the league. Shaun Hill flourished at quarterback and was a second team All-ACC selection. In 2002, the Terps set a school record for points scored with 451 while finishing second in the ACC in rushing (198.8 ypg) and scoring (32.2 ppg) offense. Taaffe helped guide quarterback Scott McBrien to an honorable mention all-league performer and finished 12th nationally in pass efficiency.

At Maryland Taaffe's offense earned national respect with a balanced attack that beat opponents both on the ground and through the air. In 2004, he led the offense during the school's first-ever victory over Florida State, then ranked No. 5. A year earlier, Taaffe helped guide the Terps through injuries to finish the season ranked in the top 30 nationally in four offensive categories (rushing (24th), total offense (28th), scoring (27th) and pass efficiency (26th).

=== Hamilton Tiger-Cats ===
On December 15, 2006 Taaffe was hired as the head coach of the Hamilton Tiger-Cats. With little talent to work with, Taaffe not surprisingly led the Tiger-Cats to a 3–15 record, with only one win against fellow Eastern Division teams. Despite Taaffe's offensive credentials, the Ti-Cats nearly 80 points fewer than any other team in the league. On September 8, 2008 the Tiger-Cats fired Taaffe and replaced him with offensive coordinator Marcel Bellefeuille.

=== UCF ===
On January 5, 2009 the University of Central Florida hired Taaffe as offensive coordinator. UCF was in much needed help on offense after finishing the 2008 season ranked 119th on total offense and 115th in passing offense. Charlie also brought his son Brian Taaffe, a freshman quarterback transfer from Fordham University.

Taaffe immediately went to work and the 2009 offense featured senior transfer quarterback Brett Hodges and a sophomore running-back Brynn Harvey. UCF posted an 8–5 record for the year, losing its bowl game, St. Petersburg Bowl, to Rutgers 24 to 45. Beginning the 2010 season, UCF's offense featured a two-quarterback system, which junior Rob Calabrese and freshman Jeffrey Godfrey. Taaffe also devised a committee of running-backs for the Knights run-game, including Ronnie Weaver, Latavius Murray, and Jonathan Davis. Jeff Godfrey would eventually take over as the starter after an injury to Rob Calabrese early in the season. Taaffe would also develop a new offensive package known as the "Wild Knight." The new offensive package developed by Taaffe and the Knights continued defensive dominance led the Knights to their most successful season in program history. The Conference USA Championship game featured a 17–7 win over the SMU Mustangs, earning UCF its second C-USA title, and earning the Knights an invite to the AutoZone Liberty Bowl. The Knights would defeat SEC foe Georgia 10–6 in the Liberty Bowl, for the program's first ever bowl win. With the successful season, UCF was ranked in the final polls for the first time, No. 20 in the coaches poll, No. 21 in the AP poll, and No. 25 in the BCS poll. In the 2013 season, the UCF Knights, with Taaffe as offensive coordinator, capped off a 12–1 record with a victory in the Fiesta Bowl, upsetting No. 5 Baylor 52–42. The combined 94 points were the most ever scored in a Fiesta Bowl. Adding another feather to Taaffe's offensive cap, UCF's quarterback for the 2013 season, Blake Bortles, would go on to be drafted third overall in the 2014 NFL draft by the Jacksonville Jaguars.

== Later life and death ==
After retiring in 2014, he was hired by a company called Quarterback Country to run a year-round quarterback training and development program. On October 30, 2019, Taaffe's sister posted on Facebook that he had died from cancer.

== Head coaching record ==
=== College ===
Year	Team	Overall	Conference	Standing	Bowl/playoffs	NCAA^{#}
The Citadel Bulldogs (Southern Conference) (1987–1995)
1987	The Citadel	4–7	1–5	8th		
1988	The Citadel	8–4	5–2	3rd	L NCAA Division I-AA First Round	14
1989	The Citadel	5–5–1	1–5–1	8th		
1990	The Citadel	7–5	4–3	T–4th	L NCAA Division I-AA First Round	15
1991	The Citadel	7–4	5–2	T–2nd		T–20
1992	The Citadel	11–2	6–1	1st	L NCAA Division I-AA Quarterfinal	1
1993	The Citadel	5–6	4–4	T–4th		
1994	The Citadel	6–5	4–4	T–5th		
1995	The Citadel	2–9	0–8	9th		
The Citadel:		55–47–1	29–34–1			
Total:		55–47–1				
National championship Conference title Conference division title or championship game berth

=== CFL ===
Team	Year	Regular season					Postseason		
Team	Year	Won	Lost	Ties	Win %	Finish	Won	Lost	Result
MTL	1999	12	6	0	.666	1st in East Division	0	1	Lost in Division Finals
MTL	2000	12	6	0	.666	1st in East Division	1	1	Lost in Grey Cup
HAM	2007	3	15	0	.167	4th in East Division	–	–	Missed playoffs
HAM	2008	2	8	0	.200	4th in East Division	–	–	Fired
Total		29	35	0	.453	2 East Division; Championships	1	2	0 Grey Cups
