= Jeff Godfrey =

American football player (born 1992)

No. 2
- Positions: Slotback, Wide receiver, Quarterback

Personal information
- Born: November 1, 1990 (age 36); Miami, Florida, U.S.
- Listed height: 5 ft 11 in (1.80 m)
- Listed weight: 190 lb (86 kg)

Career information
- High school: Miami (FL) Central
- College: UCF
- NFL draft: 2014: undrafted

Career history
- Houston Texans (2014)*; Orlando Apollos (2019)*
- * Offseason or practice squad member only

Awards and highlights
- Fiesta Bowl (2014); C-USA Freshman of the Year (2010); Freshman All-American (2010)

Jeffrey Godfrey IV (born January 1, 1992) is an American former football player. Godfrey played for the University of Central Florida Knights. He led the Knights to the Conference USA Championship in his freshman year (2010), becoming the first true freshman quarterback to win an FBS conference championship game.

Following his sophomore year, Godfrey transitioned to the wide receiver position.

== Early life ==
Godfrey was born to Jeffrey Godfrey, Jr., and Roshanda Spencer in Miami, Florida on November 1, 1990. Godfrey attended high school at Miami Central High School, located in Miami, Florida. He graduated as the leading passer in Miami-Dade County history with 7,251 yards, beating the previous record set by Jacory Harris of Miami Northwestern. In high school, Godfrey was rated as one of the top quarterbacks in Florida, and amongst the nation's top 10 dual-threat quarterbacks. Due to his performance, Godfrey has been called "Mr. Dade Football".

During his senior year, he committed to UCF. He chose the Knights over Florida State, Miami, Georgia, Tennessee, Michigan, Ohio State, Oregon, USF and FIU.

== College career ==
=== 2010 ===
Jeff Godfrey enrolled as a freshman in January 2010, and participated in spring practice. At the start of the season he was second on the depth chart behind starting junior quarterback Rob Calabrese.

In his first appearance, Godfrey took over during an opening-game rout of South Dakota, going 6-of-7 for 65 passing yards and a touchdown. He would then replace Calabrese the next week while UCF was losing to NC State. He stepped in with 5:17 to go in the third quarter, the Knights down 28–7, and led UCF on two touchdown drives to pull within one score. A fumble by one of his receivers on the third drive ended their comeback hopes with a 28–21 loss. Godfrey went 7-of-10 for 107 yards, and rushed for 53 yards, scoring both touchdowns himself.

Godfrey became the starting quarterback in the third game of the season against Buffalo, but with the understanding that he would still be splitting time with Rob Calabrese. Head coach George O'Leary felt it was important for Godfrey to watch a more experienced quarterback work as well before giving him full control of the offense. Godfrey ended up 15-of-24 with 130 passing yards, and rushed for 44 more yards.

Initially, Godfrey allowed the Knights' rushing offense to do the heavy lifting while he continued to develop his passing attack as a true freshman. During a game against UAB, Godfrey took a hard hit, forcing Calabrese to step in for the remainder of the drive. Godfrey would return and finish the game.

During UCF's game against Marshall on October 13, Calabrese was brought in to run a "Wild Knight" play, UCF's take on the Wildcat formation. He scored a touchdown, but tore his ACL in the process, firmly establishing Godfrey as starter for the remainder of the season. When UCF hosted Rice on October 23, Godfrey threw his first touchdown pass since the opener, and finished 13-of-18 for 178 yards. From there he would take full control of the UCF offense, scoring two passing touchdowns in each of the next five games, while only throwing 2 interceptions the rest of the way. His signature game as a freshman would come against Houston on November 5, where he would go 15-of-19 for 294 yards with two passing touchdowns, and rush for 105 yards–his first 100-yard rushing game at UCF–with one touchdown.

As a starter, Godfrey went 8–2 in the regular season placing UCF in both the AP Poll and USA Today Poll for the very first time in the program's history. He also led the Knights to the Conference USA title against SMU earning them an invitation to the 52nd Annual AutoZone Liberty Bowl, A clash between the Georgia Bulldogs(SEC) and the UCF Knights (C-USA) with a final score of 10–6 UCF's first ever bowl win. He finished the season completing 159-of-238 passes for 2,159 yards with 13 TDs and 6 INTs, and rushed for 556 yards and 10 more touchdowns. All those numbers are second-most for a true-freshman starter in UCF history behind Daunte Culpepper. His 105-yard rushing game against Houston was the highest rushing total for any quarterback; he had surpassed Culpepper's record earlier in the season. Godfrey exceeded a 200 passer rating four times, and only went under 100 twice. He ended up winning the Conference USA Freshman of the Year award.

=== 2011 ===
Before the 2011 season, Godfrey was placed on the watch list for the Davey O'Brien National Quarterback Award, which is given to the nation's best quarterback.

After leading the Knights to a 5–7 record in 2011, Godfrey requested his release from the team, which was granted by Head Coach George O'Leary. Godfrey was allowed to rejoin the team in April 2012, though he switched positions to become a wide receiver.

=== Statistics ===
| | | | Passing | | | | | | | | Rushing | | | |
| Season | Team | GP | Rating | Att | Comp | Pct | Yds | TD | INT | Sack | Att | Yds | Avg | TD |
|---|---|---|---|---|---|---|---|---|---|---|---|---|---|---|
| 2010 | UCF Knights | 14 | 154.3 | 238 | 159 | 66.8 | 2,159 | 13 | 8 | 18 | 152 | 566 | 3.7 | 9 |
| 2011 | UCF Knights | 12 | 140.5 | 232 | 160 | 69.0 | 1,898 | 5 | 5 | 17 | 111 | 405 | 3.6 | 9 |
| | Totals | 26 | 147.4 | 470 | 319 | 67.9 | 4,057 | 18 | 13 | 35 | 263 | 971 | 3.65 | 18 |

== Professional career ==
In 2018, Godfrey signed with the Orlando Apollos of the AAF for the 2019 season. He was waived/injured before the start of the 2019 regular season and subsequently placed on injured reserve after clearing waivers. He was waived from injured reserve on March 26, 2019.

== See also ==
- 2010 UCF Knights football team
- 2011 UCF Knights football team
- List of University of Central Florida alumni
