= 2010 UCF Knights football team =

American college football season

2010 UCF Knights football

C-USA champion C-USA East Division champion Liberty Bowl champion

C-USA Championship, W 17–7 vs. SMU

Liberty Bowl, W 10–6 vs. Georgia
- Conference: Conference USA
- East

Ranking
- Coaches: No. 20
- AP: No. 21
- Record: 11–3 (7–1 C-USA)
- Head coach: George O'Leary (7th season)
- Offensive coordinator: Charlie Taaffe (2nd season)
- Defensive coordinator: Dave Huxtable (3rd season)
- Home stadium: Bright House Networks Stadium

2010 Conference USA football standings
	Conf.			Overall
Team	W		L	W		L
East Division
No. 21 UCF x$	7	–	1	11	–	3
East Carolina	5	–	3	6	–	7
Southern Miss	5	–	3	8	–	5
Marshall	4	–	4	5	–	7
UAB	3	–	5	4	–	8
Memphis	0	–	8	1	–	11
West Division
SMU xy	6	–	2	7	–	7
No. 24 Tulsa x	6	–	2	10	–	3
Houston	4	–	4	5	–	7
UTEP	3	–	5	6	–	7
Rice	3	–	5	4	–	8
Tulane	2	–	6	4	–	8
Championship: UCF 17, SMU 7
$ – Conference champion; x – Division champion/co-champions; y – Championship game participant; As of January 11, 2011; Rankings from AP Poll

The 2010 UCF Knights football team represented the University of Central Florida in the 2010 NCAA Division I FBS football season. Their head coach was George O'Leary, who was in his seventh season with the team. For the first time in program history, the Knights were nationally ranked following a nationally televised rout of Houston on November 5. For the third time in six years, UCF won the Conference USA Eastern Division, and later became Conference USA champions for the second time in four seasons. As a result, the Knights appeared in the Liberty Bowl, in which they defeated Georgia 10–6, for the first bowl victory in program history. UCF finished the season ranked in both final national polls, 20th in the Coaches Poll, and 21st in the AP Poll.

All games were broadcast live on the UCF-ISP Sports radio network. The flagship was WYGM "740 The Game" in Orlando.

== Personnel ==
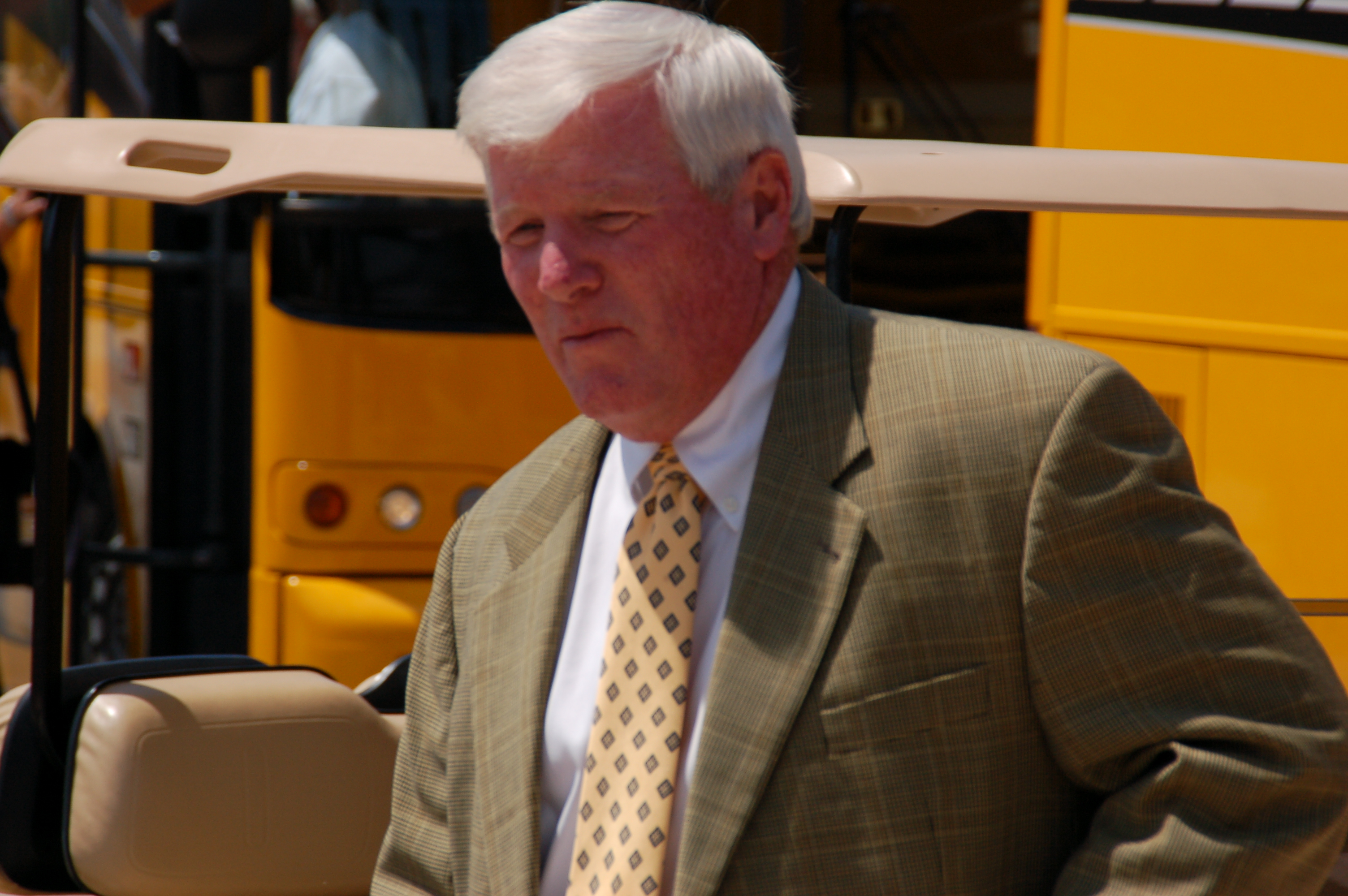
Head Coach George O'Leary

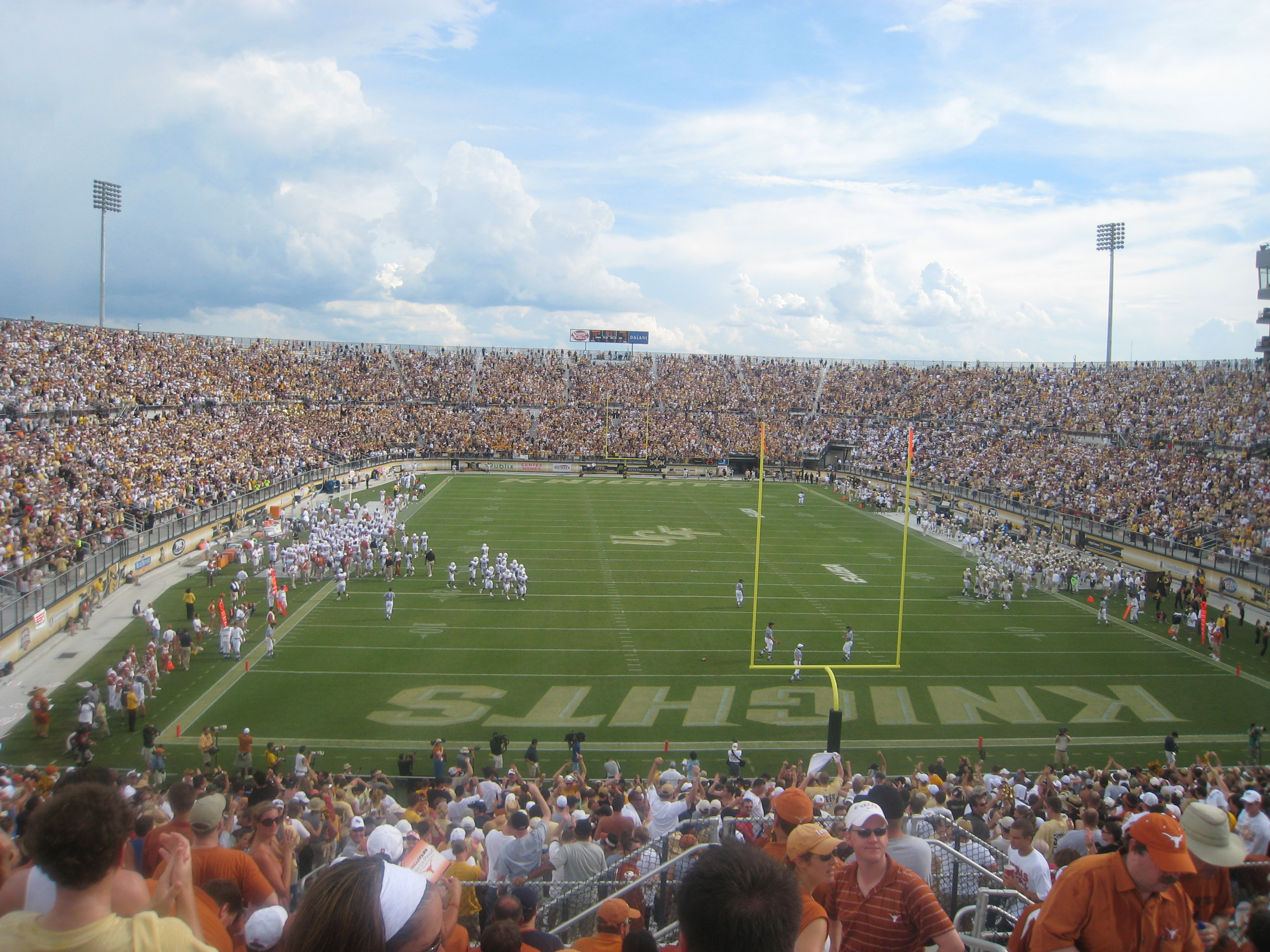
Bright House Networks Stadium

=== Coaching staff ===
2010 UCF Knights coaching staff
Head coaches: Head coach – George O'Leary; Asst. head coach/wide receivers – David Kelly; Offensive coaches: Offensive coordinator/quarterbacks – Charlie Taaffe; Running backs – George Godsey; Offensive line – Brent Key; Defensive coaches: Defensive coordinator – Dave Huxtable; Defensive run game coordinator/linebackers – John Skladany; Defensive backs – Sean Beckton; Defensive line – Jim Panagos	Special teams: Special teams coordinator/tight ends – Tim Salem; Administrative staff: Athletic director (A.D.) – Keith R. Tribble; Assistant A.D. for Football Operations – Marty O'Leary; Director of player personnel – Albert Boone

=== Roster ===
2010 UCF Knights roster
2010 Roster from the University of Central Florida Knights
Quarterbacks: 2 Jeffrey Godfrey – freshman; 4 Rob Calabrese – junior; 5 Blake Bortles – freshman; 17 L.D. Crow – (redshirt) junior; Halfbacks: 13 Dontravius Floyd – (redshirt) freshman; 28 Latavius Murray – (redshirt) sophomore; 43 Ricky Kay – senior; Fullbacks: 32 Billy Giovanetti – (redshirt) sophomore; Running backs: 7 Brandon Davis – junior; 11 Jeff Brinson – (redshirt) sophomore; 24 Brendan Kelly – (redshirt) sophomore; 27 Jonathan Davis – sophomore; 33 Kerlon Williams – (redshirt) junior; 34 Brynn Harvey – junior; 35 Ronnie Weaver – (redshirt) junior; Wide receivers: 3 A.J. Guyton – (redshirt) junior; 6 Brian Watters – (redshirt) senior; 9 Jamar Newsome – (redshirt) senior; 10 Nico Flores – (redshirt) freshman; 12 Marquee Williams – (redshirt) freshman; 14 Quincy McDuffie – sophomore; 31 Austin Hudson – (redshirt) senior; 80 Joshua Reese – freshman; 81 Kamar Aiken – senior; 82 Khymest Williams – (redshirt) junior; 87 J.T. McArthur – (redshirt) junior; Tight ends: 85 Willie Gaetjens – (redshirt) junior; 86 D.J. Brown – (redshirt) freshman; 88 Adam Nissley – (redshirt) junior	Offensive line: 58 Josh Wofford – (redshirt) freshman; 62 Rey Cunha – (redshirt) freshman; 63 Jordan McCray – freshman; 64 Justin McCray – freshman; 65 Cliff McCray – (redshirt) junior; 66 Abre Leggins – (redshirt) senior; 67 Perry Meiklejohn – freshman; 68 Theo Goins – (redshirt) sophomore; 69 Zac Norris – (redshirt) junior; 70 Chris Martin – (redshirt) freshman; 72 Torrian Wilson – freshman; 73 Jordan Rae – (redshirt) sophomore; 74 Chad Hounshell – (redshirt) sophomore; 76 Jah Reid – (redshirt) senior; 77 Nick Pieschel – (redshirt) junior; 78 Joe Perno – (redshirt) freshman; 79 Tony Jacob – freshman; Defensive ends: 48 David Williams – (redshirt) senior; 49 Bruce Miller – (redshirt) senior; 52 Jack Carter – (redshirt) junior; 53 Darius Nall – (redshirt) junior; 73 Kevin Garvy – (redshirt) sophomore; 90 Ash Weekley – (redshirt) sophomore; 93 Quenton Brown – freshman; 97 Robert Pritchard – (redshirt) sophomore; Defensive tackles: 94 Wes Tunuufi Sauvao – (redshirt) senior; 95 E.J. Dunston – freshman; 96 Andrew Rice – freshman; Defensive backs: 12 Robertson Auguste – (redshirt) sophomore; 18 Kemal Ishmael – sophomore; 19 A. J. Bouye – sophomore; 21 Darin Baldwin – senior; 23 Justin Boddie – senior; 29 Lyle Dankenbring – (redshirt) sophomore; 30 Jordan Ozerities – freshman; 31 Cornelius Whitehead – freshman; 33 Jamar McClain – freshman; 36 Woodley Cadet – freshman; 37 Henry Wright – (redshirt) freshman; 39 Omar Hansborough – (redshirt) junior; 40 Reggie Weams – senior; 46 Ray Shipman – (redshirt) sophomore; 47 Clayton Geathers – freshman	Defensive line: 44 Brandon Bryant – (redshirt) freshman; 58 Troy Davis – sophomore; 91 Victor Gray – (redshirt) freshman; 92 Barry Snider – (redshirt) junior; Linebackers: 38 Derrick Hallman – senior; 42 Loren Robinson – (redshirt) sophomore; 45 Javen Harris – (redshirt) freshman; 50 Josh Linam – junior; 51 D.J. Williams – (redshirt) sophomore; 54 Chance Henderson – (redshirt) senior; 55 Vinny Mazzurco – (redshirt) junior; 56 Cody Ralston – freshman; 59 LeBranden Richardson – freshman; Cornerbacks: 20 Josh Robinson – sophomore; 22 Emery Allen – (redshirt) senior; Safeties: 25 Jarrett Swaby – (redshirt) freshman	Punters/kickers: 16 Nick Cattoi – junior; 17 Steven Faucher – (redshirt) freshman; 41 Blake Clingan – senior; 98 David Bohner – (redshirt) junior; 99 James Boyle – sophomore; Snappers: 59 Matt Morrison – (redshirt) freshman; 60 Charley Hughlett – junior; 61 James Getsee – (redshirt) junior; Terms: Freshman – A player in his first year; Sophomore – A player in his second year; Junior – A player in his third year; Senior – A player in his fourth year; Redshirt – A player who sat out a previous season

=== Recruiting class ===
College recruiting (2010)
Name	Hometown	School	Height	Weight	40^{‡}	Commit date
Jordan Akins; WR	McDonough, GA	Union Grove	6 ft 3 in (1.91 m)	185 lb (84 kg)	N/A	Feb 3, 2010
Jordan Akins; WR	Recruit ratings: Scout: Rivals: (76)					
Blake Bortles; QB	Oviedo, FL	Oviedo	6 ft 4 in (1.93 m)	230 lb (100 kg)	N/A	Aug 1, 2009
Blake Bortles; QB	Recruit ratings: Scout: Rivals: (76)					
Quenton Brown; TE/DL	Tucker, GA	Tucker	6 ft 3 in (1.91 m)	212 lb (96 kg)	N/A	Aug 27, 2009
Quenton Brown; TE/DL	Recruit ratings: Scout: Rivals:					
Woodley Cadet; S	Loxahatchee, FL	Seminole Ridge	6 ft 2 in (1.88 m)	200 lb (91 kg)	N/A	Apr 21, 2009
Woodley Cadet; S	Recruit ratings: Scout: Rivals:					
Davious Chestnut; CB	Hemingway, SC	Carvers Bay	6 ft 3 in (1.91 m)	185 lb (84 kg)	N/A	Aug 24, 2009
Davious Chestnut; CB	Recruit ratings: Scout: Rivals:					
E.J. Dunston; DT	Orlando, FL	Edgewater	6 ft 2 in (1.88 m)	310 lb (140 kg)	N/A	Oct 13, 2009
E.J. Dunston; DT	Recruit ratings: Scout: Rivals: (71)					
Clayton Geathers; S	Hemingway, SC	Carvers Bay	6 ft 1 in (1.85 m)	190 lb (86 kg)	4.5	Aug 24, 2009
Clayton Geathers; S	Recruit ratings: Scout: Rivals:					
Jeffrey Godfrey; QB	Miami, FL	Miami Central	5 ft 11 in (1.80 m)	175 lb (79 kg)	4.6	Dec 21, 2009
Jeffrey Godfrey; QB	Recruit ratings: Scout: Rivals: (78)					
Tony Jacob; OT	Atlanta, GA	Westlake	6 ft 8 in (2.03 m)	310 lb (140 kg)	N/A	Aug 1, 2009
Tony Jacob; OT	Recruit ratings: Scout: Rivals:					
Jose Jose; G	Miami, FL	Miami Central	6 ft 2 in (1.88 m)	355 lb (161 kg)	5.63	Feb 3, 2010
Jose Jose; G	Recruit ratings: Scout: Rivals: (75)					
Jamar McClain; CB	Miami, FL	Miami Central	5 ft 10 in (1.78 m)	175 lb (79 kg)	N/A	Dec 21, 2009
Jamar McClain; CB	Recruit ratings: Scout: Rivals:					
Jordan McCray; OG	Miami, FL	Southridge	6 ft 4 in (1.93 m)	290 lb (130 kg)	5.3	Jun 8, 2009
Jordan McCray; OG	Recruit ratings: Scout: Rivals: (77)					
Justin McCray; OG	Miami, FL	Southridge	6 ft 4 in (1.93 m)	290 lb (130 kg)	5.3	Jun 8, 2009
Justin McCray; OG	Recruit ratings: Scout: Rivals: (76)					
Perry Meiklejohn; OL/DL	Miami, FL	Westminster Christian	6 ft 3 in (1.91 m)	315 lb (143 kg)	N/A	Apr 27, 2009
Perry Meiklejohn; OL/DL	Recruit ratings: Scout: Rivals: (72)					
Jordan Ozerities; CB/CR	Mount Dora, FL	Mount Dora	5 ft 11 in (1.80 m)	185 lb (84 kg)	4.5	Jul 31, 2009
Jordan Ozerities; CB/CR	Recruit ratings: Scout: Rivals:					
Cody Ralston; OLB	Calhoun, GA	Calhoun	6 ft 2 in (1.88 m)	196 lb (89 kg)	4.5	Mar 3, 2009
Cody Ralston; OLB	Recruit ratings: Scout: Rivals:					
Joshua Reese; WR	Miami, FL	Miami Central	6 ft 1 in (1.85 m)	180 lb (82 kg)	N/A	Dec 21, 2009
Joshua Reese; WR	Recruit ratings: Scout: Rivals: (79)					
Andrew Rice; DT	Lake Mary, FL	Lake Mary	6 ft 2 in (1.88 m)	280 lb (130 kg)	N/A	Jul 5, 2009
Andrew Rice; DT	Recruit ratings: Scout: Rivals: (69)					
LaBranden Richardson; DT	Miami, FL	Miami Central	6 ft 2 in (1.88 m)	225 lb (102 kg)	N/A	Jan 31, 2010
LaBranden Richardson; DT	Recruit ratings: Scout: Rivals:					
Zach Soto; OT	Miami, FL	Monsignor Pace	6 ft 6 in (1.98 m)	265 lb (120 kg)	5.1	Jul 8, 2009
Zach Soto; OT	Recruit ratings: Scout: Rivals:					
Justin Tukes; TE	Sylvester, GA	Worth County	6 ft 5 in (1.96 m)	220 lb (100 kg)	4.7	Oct 25, 2009
Justin Tukes; TE	Recruit ratings: Scout: Rivals:					
Cornelius Whitehead; WR/S	Mount Dora, FL	Mount Dora	6 ft 1 in (1.85 m)	165 lb (75 kg)	4.7	Mar 23, 2009
Cornelius Whitehead; WR/S	Recruit ratings: Scout: Rivals: (78)					
Torrian Wilson; G/C	Miami, FL	Northwestern	6 ft 4 in (1.93 m)	300 lb (140 kg)	N/A	Feb 3, 2010
Torrian Wilson; G/C	Recruit ratings: Scout: Rivals: (80)					
Overall recruit ranking: Scout: 56
‡ Refers to 40-yard dash; Note: In many cases, Scout, Rivals, 247Sports, On3, and ESPN may conflict in their listings of height, weight and 40 time.; In these cases, the average was taken. ESPN grades are on a 100-point scale.; Sources: "UCF 2010 Football Commitments". Rivals.; "2010 UCF Football Commits". Scout.; "ESPN". ESPN.; "Scout.com Team Recruiting Rankings". Scout.; "2010 Team Ranking". Rivals.com.

Notes:

- a: Jose Jose was released from his scholarship during the spring, and would later recommit to the team for the 2011 season.

== Schedule ==
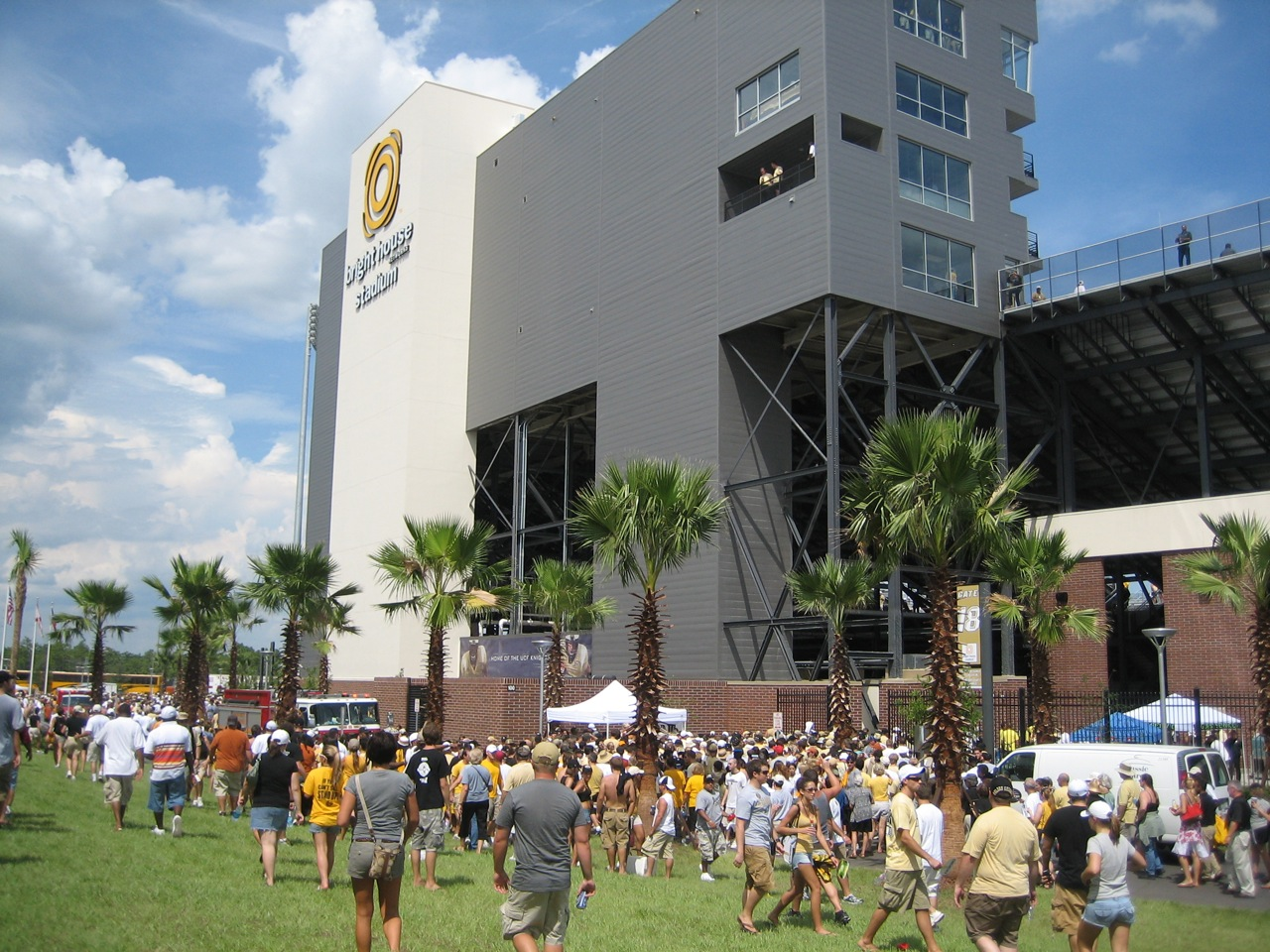
Bright House Networks Stadium, the Knights' home field

Date	Time	Opponent	Rank	Site	TV	Result	Attendance
September 4	6:00 pm	South Dakota (FCS)*		Bright House Networks Stadium; Orlando, FL		W 38–7	34,373
September 11	7:30 pm	NC State*		Bright House Networks Stadium; Orlando, FL	CBSCS	L 21–28	43,020
September 18	7:00 pm	at Buffalo*		University at Buffalo Stadium; Amherst, NY	BHSN	W 24–10	14,312
September 25	12:30 pm	at Kansas State*		Bill Snyder Family Football Stadium; Manhattan, KS	FSN	L 13–17	50,586
October 6	8:00 pm	UAB		Bright House Networks Stadium; Orlando, FL	ESPN	W 42–7	40,281
October 13	8:00 pm	at Marshall		Joan C. Edwards Stadium; Huntington, WV	ESPN	W 35–14	23,601
October 23	3:30 pm	Rice^{†}		Bright House Networks Stadium; Orlando, FL	BHSN	W 41–14	38,151
October 30	3:30 pm	East Carolina		Bright House Networks Stadium; Orlando, FL	BHSN	W 49–35	40,073
November 5	8:00 pm	at Houston		Robertson Stadium; Houston, TX	ESPN2	W 40–33	32,008
November 13	12:00 pm	Southern Miss	No. 25	Bright House Networks Stadium; Orlando, FL	CBSCS	L 21–31	40,358
November 20	3:30 pm	at Tulane		Louisiana Superdome; New Orleans, LA		W 61–14	19,069
November 27	12:00 pm	at Memphis		Liberty Bowl Memorial Stadium; Memphis, TN	CSS	W 37–17	14,992
December 4	12:00 pm	SMU		Bright House Networks Stadium; Orlando, FL (C-USA Championship)	ESPN2	W 17–7	41,045
December 31	3:30 pm	vs. Georgia*		Liberty Bowl Memorial Stadium; Memphis, TN (Liberty Bowl)	ESPN	W 10–6	51,231
*Non-conference game; ^{†}Homecoming; Rankings from AP Poll released prior to the game; All times are in Eastern time

== Rankings ==
Ranking movements Legend: ██ Increase in ranking ██ Decrease in ranking — = Not ranked RV = Received votes
	Week															
Poll	Pre	1	2	3	4	5	6	7	8	9	10	11	12	13	14	Final
AP	RV	—	—	—	—	—	—	—	—	RV	25	—	RV	RV	RV	21
Coaches	—	—	—	—	—	—	—	—	RV	RV	23	RV	RV	25	24	20
Harris	Not released						—	—	RV	RV	25	RV	RV	RV	25	Not released
BCS	Not released							—	RV	RV	RV	RV	RV	RV	25	Not released

== Game summaries ==
=== South Dakota ===
Team	1	2	3	4	Total
Coyotes	0	0	7	0	7
• Knights	14	10	7	7	38

- Location: Orlando, FL
- Game start: 6:05 p.m.
- Elapsed time: 2:37
- Game attendance: 34,373
- Game weather: 89°, sunny
- Referee: Steve Barth

UCF hosted South Dakota, becoming the FCS squad's first-ever FBS opponent.

In a match that analysts said might determine whether or not quarterback Rob Calabrese would get the team for his senior year, he rose to the challenge, throwing 12-of-15 for 176 yards and a touchdown. Jonathan Davis rushed for 107 yards on 20 carries with a touchdown, and A.J. Guyton caught 8 passes for 120 yards and a touchdown. The team never turned the ball over, and did not suffer a three-and-out. It proved to be UCF's largest margin of victory yet in a season opener.

True freshman quarterback Jeff Godfrey was brought in for the 4th quarter, when the game was already in hand, and led a touchdown drive of his own, passing 6-of-7 for 65 yards.

=== NC State ===
Team	1	2	3	4	Total
• Wolfpack	7	14	7	0	28
Knights	0	7	0	14	21

- Location: Orlando, FL
- Game start: 7:34 p.m.
- Elapsed time: 3:26
- Game attendance: 43,020
- Game weather: 87°, clear
- Referee: Ron Cherry

In a game where NC State was looking for reprisal following its 2007 upset by the Knights during the team's last meeting, UCF turned the ball over five separate times including a 43-yard interception return by the Wolfpack. Trailing by 21 points at the start of the fourth quarter, the Knights, led by true freshman quarterback Jeff Godfrey, scored two times to bring UCF within seven, but fumbled the ball with 51 seconds left on the clock at the NC State 11-yard line. Godfrey went 7-for-10 for 107 yards, and rushed for 53 yards including two rushing touchdowns. Calabrese went 10-for-18 for 106 yards with two interceptions.

Following the loss, debate arose once again over the fate of the Knights' starting quarterback job.

=== Buffalo ===
Team	1	2	3	4	Total
• Knights	3	7	0	14	24
Bulls	0	3	7	0	10

- Location: Amherst, NY
- Game start: 7:05 p.m.
- Elapsed time: 3:09
- Game attendance: 14,312
- Game weather: 68°, cloudy
- Referee: William Alge

In his first game as the Knights' starting quarterback, Jeffrey Godfrey went 15-for-24 for 130 yards. Ronnie Weaver had eight carries for 49 rushing yards, while Godfrey had 13 carries for 44 yards. Bruce Miller had a 30-yard interception return for a touchdown in the second quarter. DE Darius Nall earned Conference USA defensive player of the week honors with nine tackles, including three tackles for a loss, and two sacks.

With the start, Godfrey became the ninth true freshman quarterback to start for the Knights, and only the second, after Daunte Culpepper, to win their first start.

=== Kansas State ===
Team	1	2	3	4	Total
Knights	7	0	0	6	13
• Wildcats	0	0	3	14	17

- Location: Manhattan, KS
- Game start: 12:40 p.m.
- Elapsed time: 3:09
- Game attendance: 50,586
- Game weather: 65°, cloudy
- Referee: Ed Ardito

In a game where the UCF defense proved dominant on the field while the offense struggled, the Wildcats orchestrated a late 4th quarter comeback, scoring two touchdowns, including the winning TD with 24 seconds left on the clock. In his second game as the starting quarterback, Jeff Godfrey rushed for 99 yards, and went 8-for-18 for 92 yards. Godfrey passed Daunte Culpepper's career rushing record of 95 yards with his performance. Ronnie Weaver had 22 carries for 130 rushing yards, including one touchdown. Nick Cattoi was 2-for-4, missing 23-yard and 42-yard field goals.

With the loss, UCF held a 2–23 record against opponents from BCS automatic qualifying conferences since joining the FBS in 1996.

=== UAB ===
Team	1	2	3	4	Total
Blazers	0	0	7	0	7
• Knights	7	14	7	14	42

- Location: Orlando, FL
- Game start: 8:04 p.m.
- Elapsed time: 2:55
- Game attendance: 40,281
- Game weather: 69°, clear
- Referee: Wayne Winkler

In their conference opener, the Knights proved dominant both offensively and defensively. They were able to capitalize on Blazer turnovers, scoring three touchdowns from a forced fumble and two interceptions. Jeff Godfrey rushed for 80 yards, and went 9-for-11 for 137 yards. Rob Calabrese went 3-for-3 for 34 yards, serving as the second half of the quarterback tandem. Ronnie Weaver rushed for 50 yards on 21 carries for two touchdowns. FS Kemal Ishmael won Conference USA defensive player of the week honors with seven tackles, an interception and forced a fumble.

With the defeat of the Blazers, the Knights had a seven-game conference winning streak dating back to their October 3, 2009 win over Memphis. The game also represented the first weekday game played at Bright House Networks Stadium since its opening in 2007.

=== Marshall ===
Team	1	2	3	4	Total
• Knights	7	7	14	7	35
Thundering Herd	0	7	7	0	14

- Location: Huntington, WV
- Game start:
  8:05 p.m.
- Elapsed time: 2:44
- Game attendance: 23,601
- Game weather: 70°, cloudy
- Referee: Randy Smith

Playing for the second straight week on a Wednesday night in front of a national television audience, the Knights outlasted and dominated the Marshall Thundering Herd in Huntington. UCF had now won sixstraight games against the Thundering Herd, never losing to them as Conference USA foes. In a game that was delayed 68 minutes due to lightning, and in which there was no halftime, the Knights possessed the ball for over 40 minutes while the Thundering Herd held it for under 20. Jeff Godfrey rushed for 27 yards, and went 11-for-21 for 138 yards. Rob Calabrese suffered a season-ending knee injury on a 2-yard touchdown run in the first quarter. Ronnie Weaver rushed for 150 yards on 30 carries. On Marshall's third play of the second half, A. J. Bouye intercepted Brian Anderson and returned it 42 yards for a touchdown. UCF had now returned three interceptions for touchdowns this season; the Conference USA record was four.

Defeating the Thundering Herd, the Knights were riding an eight-game conference winning streak, tying East Carolina for the nation's fifth longest active conference winning streak. With the win, UCF was off to its best start since the 1998 season when the Knights went 9–2, and which was also Daunte Culpepper's senior year. UCF ranked atop Conference USA in all defensive categories, and the Knights' defense ranked ninth in the country.

=== Rice ===
Team	1	2	3	4	Total
Owls	0	0	7	7	14
• Knights	13	14	7	7	41

- Location: Orlando, FL
- Game start: 3:35 p.m.
- Elapsed time: 2:57
- Game attendance: 38,151
- Game weather: 82°, cloudy
- Referee: David Smith

UCF scored the first touchdown of the game 1:23 after kickoff with two plays completed, and held Rice's offensive line from completing a first down until the second quarter of the game. The Knights scored on their first five drives and did not punt until 2:58 was left in the 3rd quarter. Jeff Godfrey rushed for 41 yards, and went 13-for-18 for 178 yards. L.D. Crow, the Knights' new second-string quarterback to replace Rob Calabrese, went 5-for-6 for 91 yards. Ronnie Weaver rushed for 53 yards on 15 carries. DE Darius Nall won Conference USA co-defensive player of the week honors for the second time this season with 2.5 sacks, a forced fumble and a pass pressure.

With the defeat of the Owls, the Knights had a nine-game conference winning streak, tied for the fourth longest in the nation. UCF was 21–10 all time on Homecoming weekend and 17–7 (12-3) at home. UCF's defense ranked atop Conference USA in all categories and was ranked seventh nationally. After the game, the Knights received two votes in the USA Today Coaches Poll, and three votes in the Harris Poll. They were ranked 41st in the BCS Standings.

=== East Carolina ===
Team	1	2	3	4	Total
Pirates	7	7	7	14	35
• Knights	14	14	7	14	49

- Location: Orlando, FL
- Game start: 3:36 p.m.
- Elapsed time: 3:12
- Game attendance: 40,073
- Game weather: 82°, fair
- Referee: Wayne Winkler

The Knights proved dominant both offensively and defensively throughout the game, garnering their first win against East Carolina in five years. The game marked the latest that two undefeated Conference USA teams had played since the conference expanded to 12 teams and started divisional play in 2003. UCF proved so dominant on the field that for the first time since a 48–0 win over Eastern Illinois in 1998, the Knights did not punt the ball. For the entirety of the second half of the game, UCF held at least a 14-point advantage. Jeff Godfrey rushed for 43 yards, and went 8-for-12 for 159 yards. Ronnie Weaver earned Conference USA offensive player of the week honors, rushing for a career-high 180 yards on 30 carries for two touchdowns. Latavius Murray had 7 carries for 47 yards with three touchdowns, and Brian Waters had two receptions for 55 yards.

The Knights had won four consecutive games, and own a 10-game conference winning streak, the third longest in the nation. With the defeat of East Carolina, the Knights were the only team still undefeated in conference play, and they held a commanding lead in the Eastern Division. After the game, the Knights received five votes in the AP Poll, 13 votes in the USA Today Coaches Poll, and 7 votes in the Harris Poll. They were ranked 32nd in the BCS Standings.

=== Houston ===
Team	1	2	3	4	Total
• Knights	7	16	7	10	40
Cougars	3	7	14	9	33

- Location: Houston, TX
- Game start: 8:07 p.m.
- Elapsed time: 3:21
- Game attendance: 32,008
- Game weather: 64°, clear
- Referee: Ed Ardito

In a game with 1,054 yards of total offense, the Knights' true freshman quarterback Jeff Godfrey led the team to a 40–33 victory over the Cougars with three late-scoring drives. Godfrey went 15-for-19 for 294 yards with two touchdowns and no interceptions, and 105 yards rushing. Latavius Murray rushed for 78 yards on 11 carries for a touchdown. Ronnie Weaver had 19 carries for 45 yards, and Jamar Newsome had 5 receptions for 123 yards. The Knights only trailed for six and a half minutes the entire game, and dominated the time of possession with 36 minutes to the Cougars' 24 minutes. UCF only punted twice in the last eight quarters. QB Jeff Godfrey earned Conference USA offensive player of the week honors, and LB Josh Linam took defensive player of the week honors for their performances.

The Knights were on an 11-game conference winning streak, the third longest active streak in the nation behind Boise State and TCU. With the defeat of the Cougars, the Knights remained the only team undefeated in conference play, and they held home-field advantage over Houston in a possible Conference championship game. Following the game, for the first time in school history, UCF received top 25 rankings: #23 in the USA Today Coaches Poll, #25 in the AP Poll and #25 in the Harris Poll.

=== Southern Miss ===
Team	1	2	3	4	Total
• Golden Eagles	3	14	7	7	31
#23 Knights	14	0	0	7	21

- Location: Orlando, FL
- Game start: 12:02 p.m.
- Elapsed time: 3:13
- Game attendance: 40,358
- Game weather: 73°, clear
- Referee: Steve Barth

The Knights started out fast against the Golden Eagles, storming out to a 14–0 lead by the middle of the 1st quarter. Jeff Godfrey ran for the first TD, then threw a 4-yard pass to Brian Watters for the second. From there the offense faltered, as the Knights' defense was worn out by facing their third straight no-huddle offense. Southern Miss scored 31 unanswered points, to jump out to a 31–14 lead halfway through the 4th quarter. With four minutes left, Godfrey threw a 40-yard touchdown pass to Jamar Newsome to cut the lead to 10, but the Knights failed to recover an on-side kick. Godfrey went 16-of-25 for 190 yards, and threw two interceptions. Ronnie Weaver had 12 carries for 112 yards, and Jamar Newsome had five receptions for 100 yards and a TD.

The loss dropped the Knights from the polls, but they continued to control their own destiny for the chance to host the 2010 Conference USA Football Championship Game for the third time.

=== Tulane ===
Team	1	2	3	4	Total
• Knights	31	7	7	16	61
Green Wave	0	14	0	0	14

- Location:
  New Orleans, LA
- Game start: 3:30 p.m.
- Elapsed time: 3:00
- Game attendance: 19,069
- Game weather: N/A (indoors)
- Referee: R.G. Detillier

Bouncing back from their lost the previous week, the Knights jumped out to a quick lead with a 95-yard kickoff return by Quincy McDuffie. UCF held a 31–0 lead at the end of the 1st quarter, which set a school record for points in a first quarter. The Knights only allowed Tulane two net yards in the first quarter, and at halftime led 38–14. The final play of the game, a Tulane hail mary pass, was intercepted and returned 100 yards by freshman cornerback Jordan Ozerities. Jeff Godfrey went 6-for-8 for 133 yards with two touchdowns and no interceptions. Latavius Murray rushed for 146 yards on 11 carries for a touchdown. Ronnie Weaver had nine carries for 58 yards, and Kamar Aiken had two receptions for 70 yards and an interception. KR Quincy McDuffie earned Conference USA special teams player of the week honors for his performance.

The 61 points scored were the most of Coach George O’Leary's seven-year tenure at UCF. With the win against the Green Wave, and the loss by East Carolina, the Knights continued to control their own destiny for the chance to host the Conference USA Championship Game.

=== Memphis ===
Team	1	2	3	4	Total
• Knights	7	9	7	14	37
Tigers	7	0	3	7	17

- Location: Memphis, TN
- Game start: 12:07 p.m.
- Elapsed time: 2:42
- Game attendance: 14,992
- Game weather: 49°, clear
- Referee: D. Smith

Despite the loss by Southern Miss the previous night to lock up the Eastern Division and home-field for the conference championship game for UCF, the Knights played as if they still needed to win. Jeff Godfrey had a signature performance, throwing 14-of-17 for 252 yards and two touchdowns, and rushing for a third touchdown. Sophomore running back Latavius Murray added 75 rushing yards with two touchdowns. Jamar Newsome had four receptions for 118 yards and two touchdowns. In the game, senior defensive end Bruce Miller recorded two sacks against the Tigers, becoming the school's career leader, with 32.

With the win, the Knights returned to the national rankings, placing 25th in the USA Today Coaches Poll. UCF finished the regular season with a 9–3 overall record, and a 7–1 record in C-USA. This was the third time in six years that UCF had dropped only one conference game, all three times appearing in the league title game.

=== Conference USA Championship Game ===
Team	1	2	3	4	Total
SMU	0	0	0	7	7
• #25 Knights	7	3	7	0	17

- Location: Orlando, FL
- Game start: 12:01 p.m.
- Elapsed time: 2:58
- Game attendance: 41,045
- Game weather: 66°, clear
- Referee: Randy Smith
- TV announcers (ESPN2): Bob Wischusen (play-by-play), Brian Griese (color)

UCF hosted the Conference USA Championship for the third time in its six years of existence. The Knights jumped out to a quick lead with a 13-play, 73-yard drive that ended with a 5-yard TD pass from Jeff Godfrey to Latavius Murray. UCF scored again as the first half ended with a 29–yard field goal by Nick Cattoi, which led to a 10–0 Knight lead at the half. The Knights stretched the lead to 17–0, by scoring on a 36–yard run by Latavius Murray. The UCF defense proved dominant, with five sacks, six quarterback hurries and two interceptions, and did not allow an SMU score until the fourth quarter. UCF defeated SMU 17–7 to capture their second C-USA title. The seven points allowed by the Knights was a C-USA title game record for fewest points allowed to an opponent. The Knights now led the all-time series against SMU 3–0. Jeffrey Godfrey went 15-for-19 for 167 yards and a touchdown. Godfrey's 78.9% completion percentage was a record for a C-USA championship game. Latavius Murray rushed for 94 yards on 20 carries for a touchdown, and had two receptions for 21 yards with a touchdown. Ronnie Weaver had eight carries for 35 yards, and Kamar Aiken had four receptions for 52 yards. For his performance, RB Latavius Murray earned the C-USA Championship Game MVP award.

The Knights tied the school record for wins, 10, and would be playing in the Liberty Bowl for the second time in four years. UCF had now won three straight games, and eight of the last nine. Following the game, the Knights placed 24th in the Coaches Poll, 25th in the Harris poll, and in the AP Poll were first in the 'others receiving votes' category, ranking them unofficially at number 26. With the rankings, UCF earned its first appearance in the BCS Standings, ranking 25th overall, and becoming the 83rd team to be represented in the rankings.

Due to the tendency for fans to shake "The Bouncehouse," ESPN2, for their television production, set up a camera position outside the stadium to eliminate camera bounce caused by the crowd.

=== Liberty Bowl ===
Team	1	2	3	4	Total
Bulldogs	3	0	3	0	6
• #24 Knights	0	3	0	7	10

- Location: Memphis, TN
- Game start: 3:30 p.m.
- Elapsed time: 3:17
- Game attendance: 51,231
- Game weather: 67°, cloudy
- Referee: R. Loumiet (Big 12)
- TV announcers (ESPN): Dave Neal (play-by-play), Andre Ware (color), Cara Capuano (sideline)

The Knights faced the Georgia Bulldogs in the AutoZone Liberty Bowl. It was UCF's second trip to the bowl in four years, and marked the second meeting between the two schools. The Knights lost the previous meeting, 23–24, in 1999, in a game sometimes known as the "Burglary Between the Hedges." The game marked UCF's first ever bowl win, and their third win over an AQ opponent. UCF had one previous win over an SEC team–a 40–38 win over Alabama at Tuscaloosa in 2000. The win in Tuscaloosa was the Knights' first win over an opponent from an AQ conference.

The Knights started fast out of the gate, with Quincy McDuffie returning the opening kickoff 95 yards for a touchdown, but the play was called back to UCF's 11-yard line due to a holding penalty. After the penalty the drive fizzled, and Blake Clingan punted the ball, giving Georgia their first possession at their two-yard line. The Bulldogs drove 95 yards in 9:13, ending with a Blair Walsh 20-yard field goal to give Georgia a 3–0 lead. The Knights tied the game with a Nick Cattoi 22-yard field goal with 33 seconds left in the first half. The drive started with an interception and 13-yard return by Josh Linam. To open the second half, Georgia launched a 13-play, 61-yard drive that ended with a Blair Walsh 41-yard field goal, giving the Bulldogs a 6–3 lead. Behind quarterback Jeffrey Godfrey, who was injured in the first quarter, the Knights drove down the field with a 65-yard drive in the fourth quarter. With 9:01 left, Latavius Murray scored on a 10-yard touchdown run to give the Knights a 10–6 lead that they would not relinquish.

Jeffrey Godfrey went 16-for-29 for 116 yards, and threw two interceptions. Latavius Murray rushed for 104 yards on 18 carries for a touchdown, earning him Liberty Bowl MVP honors. Nick Cattoi was 1-for-1 with a 22-yard field goal, and Reggie Weams and Josh Linam both had interceptions in the game, for 22 yards and 13 yards respectively. DE Bruce Miller recorded 1.5 sacks against the Bulldogs, his 36th career sack. Miller now ranked second in Florida history in sacks, and 5th all-time in the FBS.

With the victory, the Knights set a then-school record with 11 wins, and earned their first win as a nationally ranked BCS squad, cementing the best season in school history up to that point. UCF finished the year with more wins than any other FBS team in Florida, and was the only team in the state to be nationally ranked in both the BCS and the AP men's basketball poll. The UCF senior class ended their careers with 33 total victories, the most of any UCF senior class up to that point.

IGeorge O'Leary for the first time achieved an over .500 record at UCF. With the win, his record was 45–44 with the Knights, and he was only three shy of 100 career wins. The win gives him a career record of 4–5 against the Bulldogs.

== Awards and milestones ==
In addition to winning the Conference USA title, UCF and its players won several other awards. Head coach George O'Leary was named C-USA Coach of the Year for the third time. Having twice won ACC Coach of the Year, O'Leary had now been awarded coach of the year five times, trailing only South Carolina's Steve Spurrier (six) and Utah's Dennis Erickson (six) among active FBS coaches. Jeff Godfrey was named C-USA Freshman of the Year, joining Kevin Smith as the only Knight to win the honor. Godfrey ranks eighth in the nation in passing efficiency at 165.28, completing 68.4% of his passes, tops among all FBS quarterbacks. Godfrey also became the first true freshman quarterback to lead his team to an FBS conference championship. Defensive end Bruce Miller was named C-USA Defensive Player of the Year for the second year in a row, becoming only the second conference player to earn the award more than once.

=== All-Conference Teams ===
- C-USA First Team: Jah Reid, Bruce Miller, Kemal Ishmael, Josh Robinson, Quincy McDuffie
- C-USA Second Team: Ronnie Weaver, Darius Nall, Charley Hughlett

=== School records ===
- Best record: 9–3 (regular season) (T–2007), 11–3 (final including bowl game)
- Best regular season conference record: 7–1 (T–2005, 2007)
- Highest ranking: #25 (BCS), #21 (AP), #20 (Coaches), #25 (Harris)

== Offseason ==
=== NFL draft ===
Two former players were selected in the 2011 NFL draft:

Round	Pick	Overall	Name	Position	Team
3rd	21	85th	Jah Reid	Offensive tackle	Baltimore Ravens
7th	8	211th	Bruce Miller	Defensive end	San Francisco 49ers
