= Wildcat formation =

American football offensive formation

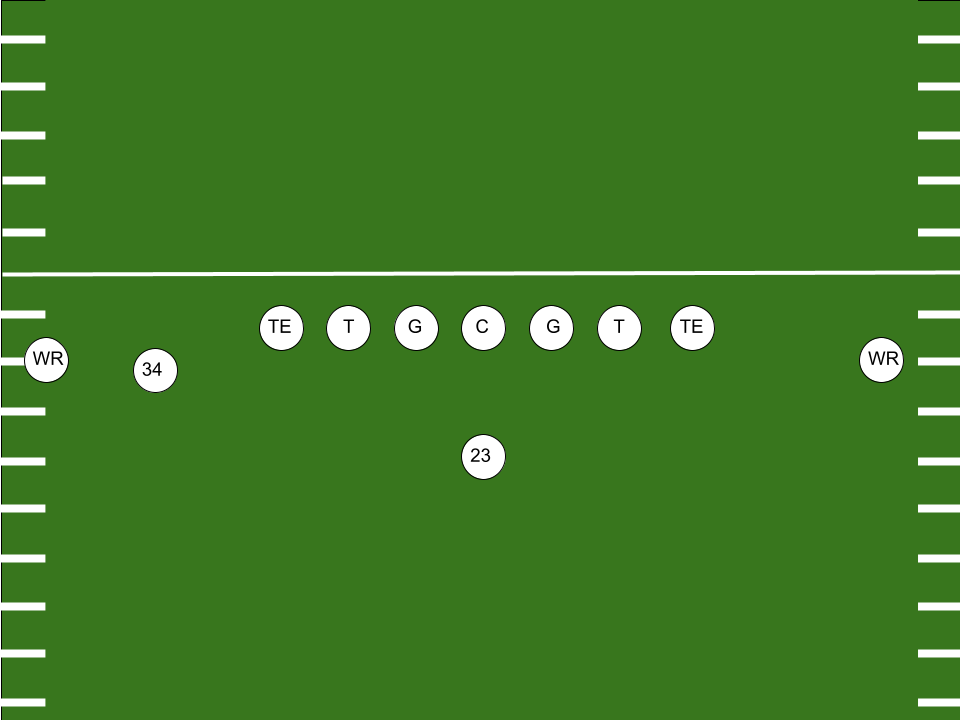
This is the wildcat formation used by the Miami Dolphins offense during the 2008 season. The number 23 indicates running back Ronnie Brown, and number 34 indicates running back Ricky Williams. Usually in this formation Ricky Williams would motion in front of the quarterback.

Wildcat formation is a formation for the offense in football in which the ball is snapped not to the quarterback but directly to a player of another position lined up at the quarterback position. (In most systems, this is a running back, but some playbooks have a wide receiver, fullback, or tight end taking the snap.) The wildcat features an unbalanced offensive line and looks to the defense like a sweep behind zone blocking. A player moves across the formation prior to the snap. However, once this player crosses the position of the running back who will receive the snap, the play develops unlike the sweep.

The wildcat is a gambit rather than an overall offensive philosophy. It can be a part of many offenses. For example, a spread-option offense might use the wildcat formation to confuse the defense, or a West Coast offense may use the power-I formation to threaten a powerful run attack.

The wildcat scheme is a derivation of Pop Warner's single wing offense dating back to the 1920s. The wildcat was invented by Billy Ford and Ryan Wilson, and was originally called the "dual" formation. The offensive coaching staff of the Kansas State Wildcats, namely Bill Snyder and Del Miller, made significant contributions to the formation's development throughout the 1990s and 2000s and is often cited as being the formation's namesake. It has been used since the late 1990s at every level of the game, including the CFL, NFL, NCAA, NAIA, and high schools across North America. Coaching staffs have used it with variations and have given their versions a variety of names. The wildcat was popularized in the first decade of the 2000s by South Carolina Gamecocks coach Steve Spurrier to use Syvelle Newton in all offensive positions on the field. It was also used in that decade by the Arkansas Razorbacks, employing the unique skill set of their three running backs, Darren McFadden, Felix Jones, and Peyton Hillis. It was eventually used in the NFL by the Miami Dolphins through running backs Ronnie Brown and Ricky Williams. Though its popularity as a regular offensive weapon has waned in recent years as defenses have adapted to it, some teams still use it occasionally as a trick play.

== History ==
One possible precursor to the wildcat formation was named the "wing-T", and is widely credited to being first implemented by coach Tubby Raymond and the Delaware Fightin' Blue Hens football team. Raymond later wrote a book on the innovative formation. The wildcat's similarity to the wing-T is the focus on series football, where the initial movements of every play look similar. For example, the wing-T makes use of motion across the formation as well in order to draw a reaction from the defense, but runs several different plays from the same look.

Another possible precursor to the wildcat is the offense of six-man football, a form of high school football, played mostly in rural West Texas and Montana, that was developed in 1934. In six-man, the person who receives the snap may not run the ball past the line of scrimmage. To bypass this limitation, teams often snap the ball to a receiver, who then tosses the ball to the potential passer. The passer may then throw the ball to a receiver or run with the ball himself.

The virtue of having a running back take the snap in the wildcat formation is that the rushing play is 11-on-11, although different variations have the running back hand off or throw the football. In a standard football formation, when the quarterback stands watching, the offense operates 10-on-11 basis. The motion also presents the defense with an immediate threat to the outside that it must respect no matter what the offense decides to do with the football.

Another advantage of the wildcat formation is it can be run from typical football personnel group, such as a quarterback, a fullback, a running back, a tight end, and two wide receivers without substitution, by using the players outside of their normal roles. The quarterback, by lining up as a wide receiver, is both pass receiving threat and can block a defensive back. The running back, receiving a direct snap, is a running threat on a variety of designed plays, and has the potential to pass the ball. Using an unbalanced offensive line, along with a tight end and a fullback, provides a variations of the line up to provide strength to the formation, as well as receiving options, and using a wide receiver in motion as a potential flanker sweep provides a second running option. Not needing to substitute on offense for a short yardage situation can prevent the defense from substituting into a short-yardage defensive formation, which may provide a mismatch.

== High school ==
The Wall Street Journal credited Hugh Wyatt, a longtime coach in the Pacific Northwest, with naming the offense. Wyatt, coaching the La Center High School Wildcats, published an article in Scholastic Coach and Athletic Director magazine in 1998, where he explained his version of the offense, which relied on two wing backs as the two backfield players directly behind the center, alternating to receive the snap. Other high school football programs across the United States adopted Wyatt's wildcat offense.

== College ==
Alabama's David Palmer was one of the first "wildcat" quarterbacks on the national scene running the formation in 1993.

The wildcat was popularized on the college level by Bill Snyder, head coach of the Kansas State University Wildcats with Michael Bishop as quarterback in 1997 and 1998 when they made a run at the top of the national rankings. Bishop rushed for 1304 career yards in two seasons, including 748 yards on 177 carries during the 1998 season. Snyder's success inspired Urban Meyer at the start of his career. Meyer's subsequent success with quarterback Josh Harris at Bowling Green helped the formation come to the fore.

The wildcat was continued by former Auburn head coach Gus Malzahn, and former Ole Miss Rebels offensive coordinator David Lee when they were offensive coordinators for the Arkansas Razorbacks after seeing the success of Snyder and Meyer. In 2006, Malzahn was the offensive coordinator for the Razorbacks. Malzahn introduced the wildcat into the Arkansas offense. When Malzahn left for Tulsa in 2007, Lee became the offensive coordinator for the Razorbacks. Both Malzahn and Lee ran a variation of the wildcat formation which prominently featured running backs Darren McFadden and Felix Jones. The wildcat formation was called the "wildhog" in honor of the razorback mascot at the University of Arkansas, and then rebranded as the "wild rebel" when Arkansas head coach Houston Nutt went to Ole Miss as head coach (Ole Miss' mascot being the Rebel), and a variation involving a direct snap to a tight end has been called the "wild turkey" by the Virginia Tech Hokies.

Other college teams have used the wildcat formation regularly, including the wildcats of Kansas State, Kentucky, and Villanova, as well as the Pitt Panthers. Pitt had great success with the formation having star running back LeSean McCoy or running back LaRod Stephens-Howling take the snap. The Panthers scored numerous times from this formation during those years. Villanova won the 2009 FCS championship with a multiple offense that included the wildcat, with wide receiver Matt Szczur taking the snap. Szczur scored a key touchdown in the Wildcats' semifinal against William & Mary out of the formation, and made a number of big plays out of the wildcat against Montana in the final.

UCF uses a wildcat formation they call the "wild knight." It was originally intended to be run by Rob Calabrese, even after he lost the starting job in 2010 to Jeff Godfrey, but he tore his ACL using the play to score a rushing touchdown against Marshall on October 13, 2010. At the time, most agreed that Calabrese was effective at running the wild knight formation.

== National Football League ==
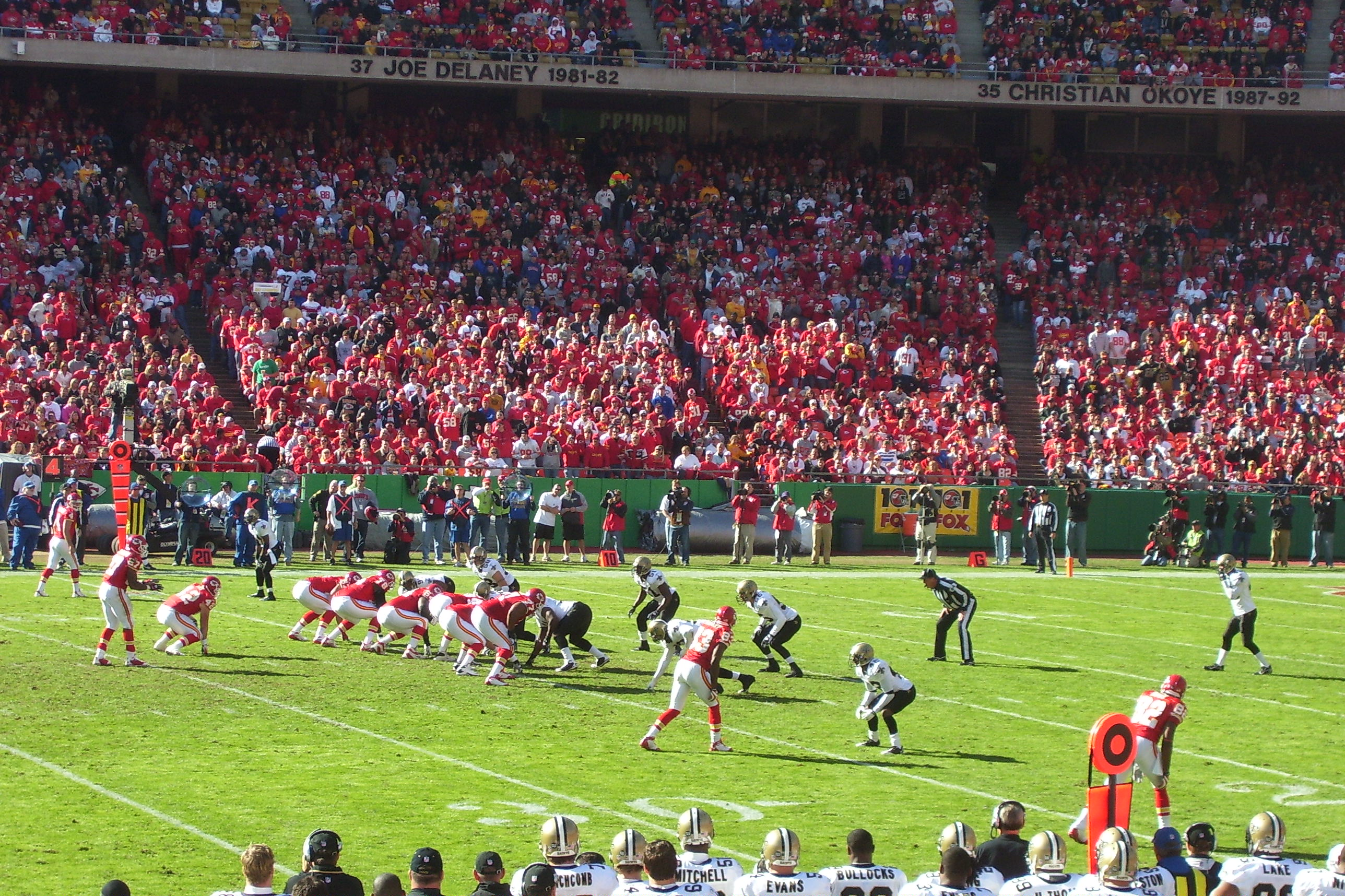
Former Chiefs running back Larry Johnson lines up at the quarterback position in the wildcat formation, 2008

The wildcat formation made an appearance in 1998, when Minnesota Vikings' offensive coordinator Brian Billick began employing formations where QB Randall Cunningham lined up as a wide receiver and third-down specialist David Palmer took the direct snap from the center with the option to pass or run.

In the 1998 NFC Championship, with 7:58 to go in the third quarter, on a second-and-5 play, the Atlanta Falcons deployed quarterback Chris Chandler wide left as a receiver while receiver Tim Dwight took a direct snap and ran 20 yards for a first down.

In a December 24, 2006, game between the Carolina Panthers and Atlanta Falcons, the Panthers deployed a formation without a quarterback and snapped the ball directly to running back DeAngelo Williams for much of the game. The Panthers, under head coach John Fox and offensive coordinator Dan Henning, elected to run the ball—mostly in this formation—for the first twelve plays of the opening drive, and ran the ball 52 times, with only seven passing plays. The coaching staff named the package "tiger" when running back DeAngelo Williams was on the field and "Wildcat" when backup quarterback Brett Basanez was under center, both after their respective alma maters, the University of Memphis and Northwestern University. Coordinator Henning later developed this concept into the "wildcat" as the offensive coordinator for the Miami Dolphins.

Relying on the experience of quarterbacks coach Lee, who had run the scheme at Arkansas, the 2008 Miami Dolphins under Henning implemented the wildcat offense beginning in the third game of the 2008 season with great success, instigating a wider trend throughout the NFL. The Dolphins started the wildcat trend in the NFL lining up either running back Ronnie Brown (in most cases) or Ricky Williams to take a shotgun snap with the option of handing off, running, or throwing. Through eleven games, the wildcat averaged over seven yards per play for the Dolphins. "It could be the single wing, it could be the Delaware split buck business that they used to do," Dolphins offensive coordinator Dan Henning said. "It comes from all of that." On September 21, 2008, the Miami Dolphins used the wildcat offense against the New England Patriots on six plays, which produced five touchdowns (four rushing and one passing—from Brown himself) in a 38–13 upset victory.

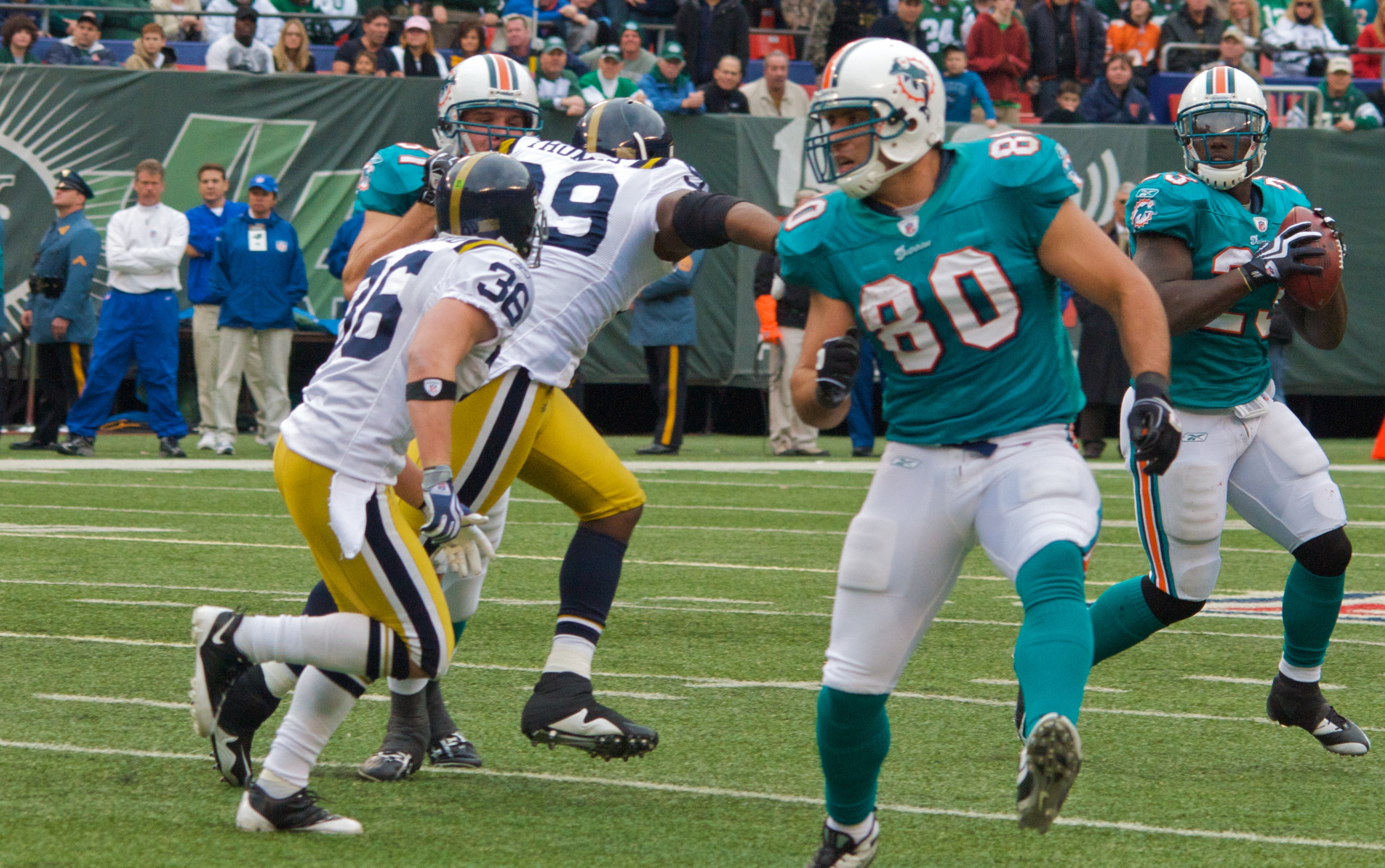
Ronnie Brown (far right) of the Miami Dolphins passing out of the wildcat in November 2009

As the popularity of the wildcat spread during the 2008 NFL season, several teams began instituting it as a part of their playbook.

Defending plays from the wildcat requires linemen and linebackers to know and execute their own assignments without over-pursuing what may turn into a fake or a reverse. The formation's initial success in 2008 can be attributed in part to surprise—defenses had not practiced their countermeasures against such an unusual offensive strategy. Since then, most teams are well prepared to stop the wildcat; an example came in November 2008 when the Patriots traveled to Miami nine weeks after the Dolphins win in Foxborough; Bill Belichick's defense limited the wildcat to just 27 yards and forced the Dolphins to try a conventional passing attack; the game lead changed six times but the Patriots wore out the Dolphins with a 48–28 win.

Though defenses now understand how to stop the wildcat, it does not mean the formation is no longer useful. A defense's practice time is finite. Opponents who prepare to stop the wildcat have less time available to prepare for other offensive approaches. Many teams admit to spending an inordinate amount of time having to prepare for this scheme. The Philly Special, an iconic play during Super Bowl LII, was run out of the wildcat.

Other teams that use the wildcat formation in the NFL have used different names for their versions. At one time, the Carolina Panthers called their version the "Mountaineer formation", named after the Appalachian State Mountaineers, the alma mater of their wildcat quarterback Armanti Edwards, who played quarterback for the Mountaineers. The Denver Broncos use "wild horses", developed in 2009. The New York Jets referred to their version as the "tigercat" formation in reference to Brad Smith having attended the University of Missouri when Smith played for New York from 2009 to 2010. The 2011 Minnesota Vikings referred to their formation as the "Blazer package" which employed former UAB Blazers quarterback Joe Webb.

== Canadian Football League ==
Until the 2009 season, a technicality in the league rules made the wildcat offense illegal; essentially, the rule stated that a designated quarterback must be in position to take all snaps. This has since been changed.
