= 2010 Liberty Bowl (December) =

2010 Auto Zone Liberty Bowl
- 52nd Liberty Bowl
Georgia Bulldogs	UCF Knights
(6–6)	(10–3)
SEC	C-USA
6	10
Head coach: Mark Richt	Head coach: George O'Leary
	AP / Coaches / BCS; – / 24 / 25
	1	2	3	4	Total
Georgia	3	0	3	0	6
UCF	0	3	0	7	10
- Date: December 31, 2010
- Season: 2010
- Stadium: Liberty Bowl Memorial Stadium
- Location: Memphis, Tennessee
- MVP: Latavius Murray (RB, UCF)
- Favorite: Georgia by 6
- Referee: Rick Loumiet (Big 12)
- Halftime show: The O'Jays
- Attendance: 51,231
- Payout: US$1.35 million

United States TV coverage
- Network: ESPN
- Announcers: Dave Neal and Andre Ware
- Nielsen ratings: 3.2

The 2010 Liberty Bowl was a college football postseason bowl game played at Liberty Bowl Memorial Stadium in Memphis, Tennessee, on December 31, 2010. The 52nd edition of the Liberty Bowl matched up the Georgia Bulldogs of the Southeastern Conference (SEC) against the UCF Knights, the Conference USA champions. With sponsorship from AutoZone, the game was officially the AutoZone Liberty Bowl. The game was won by UCF, 10–6.

The game marked UCF's second appearance in the Liberty Bowl. In the 2007 edition, the Knights had lost to Mississippi State. With a 1–1 record in prior appearances, this was Georgia's third trip to the Liberty Bowl.

== Teams ==
Georgia running back Caleb King, backup cornerback Derek Owens and reserve offensive tackle A. J. Harmon were suspended for the Liberty Bowl for academic issues.

== Game notes ==
The victory marked UCF's first-ever bowl win. No. 25 UCF and Georgia faced each other in the second meeting between the two schools. The Bulldogs won the previous meeting, 24-23, in 1999, in a game sometimes known as the "Burglary Between the Hedges."

The Knights started fast out of the gate, with Quincy McDuffie returning the opening kickoff 95-yards for a touchdown, but the play was called back due to a holding penalty. Georgia took a 3-0 lead behind a 95-yard drive later in the first quarter. Late in the second quarter, an interception by UCF's Josh Linam set up a 22-yard field goal, and a 3-3 tie at halftime.

With Georgia leading 6-3 in the fourth quarter, UCF quarterback Jeffrey Godfrey drove the Knights 65 yards for the game's first touchdown, and a 10-6 lead. In the final seconds, Georgia had an attempt at a potential game-winning "hail mary" pass, but it was knocked down by Kemal Ishmael as time expired.

Latavius Murray rushed for 104 yards on 18 carries, with one touchdown, earning him Liberty Bowl MVP honors.

=== Scoring summary ===
Quarter	Time	Drive		Team	Scoring Information	Score	
Quarter	Time	Length	Time	Team	Scoring Information	UGA	UCF
1	02:02	15 plays, 95 yards	9:13	UGA	Blair Walsh 20–yard field goal	3	0
2	00:33	8 plays, 27 yards	0:54	UCF	Nick Cattoi 22–yard field goal	3	3
3	09:23	13 plays, 61 yards	5:37	UGA	Blair Walsh 41–yard field goal	6	3
4	08:53	11 plays, 65 yards	5:39	UCF	Latavius Murray 10–yard run, Nick Cattoi kick good	6	10
Final Score						6	10
