= George O'Leary =

American football coach and college athletics administrator

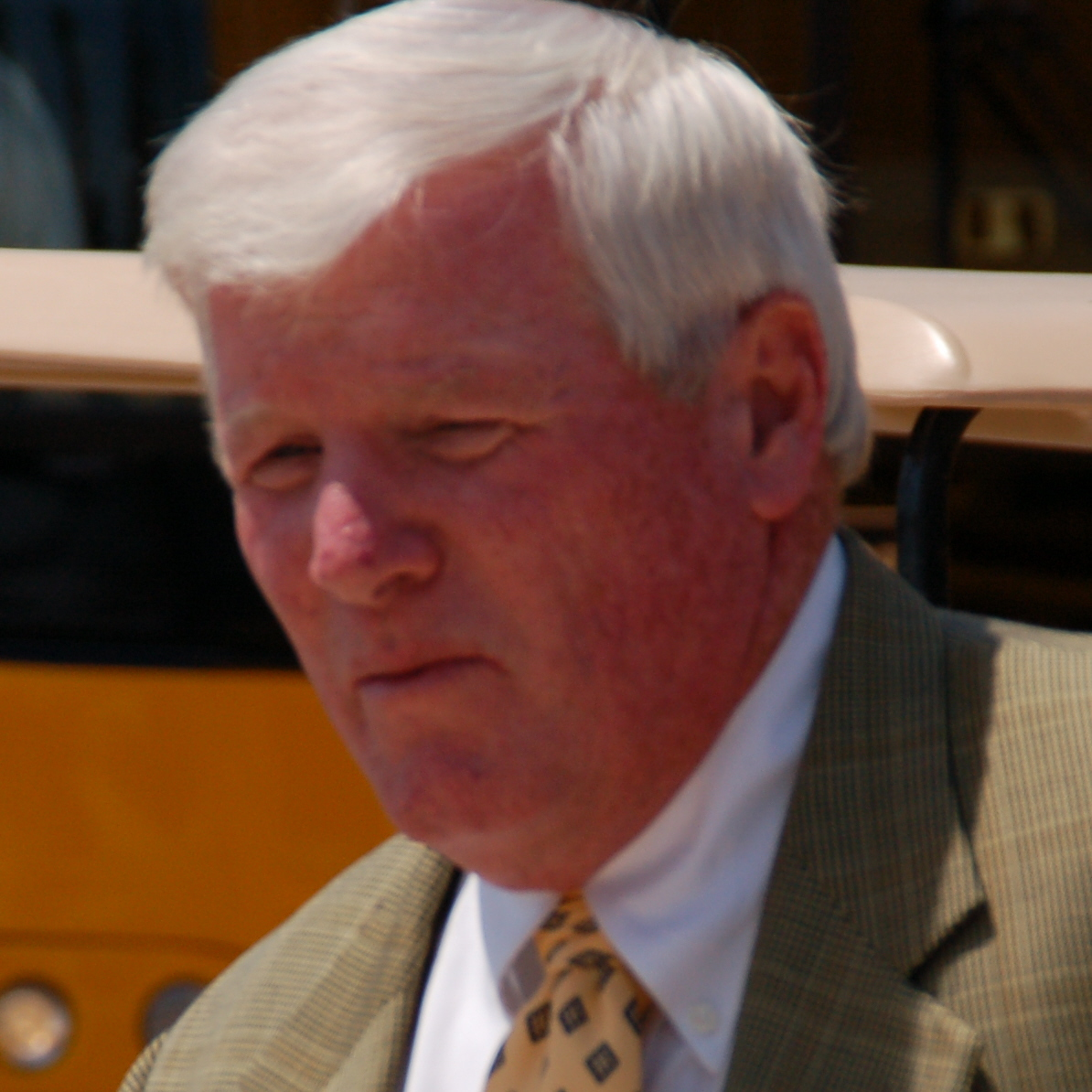
- O'Leary in 2007 pictured during UCF's home opener

Biographical details
- Born: August 17, 1946 (age 80); Manhattan, New York, U.S.
- Education: University of New Hampshire

Coaching career (HC unless noted)
- 1968–1974: Central Islip HS (NY) (AHC)
- 1975–1976: Central Islip HS (NY)
- 1977–1979: Liverpool HS (NY)
- 1980–1984: Syracuse (AHC/DL)
- 1985–1986: Syracuse (DC/DL)
- 1987–1991: Georgia Tech (DC/DL)
- 1992–1993: San Diego Chargers (DL)
- 1994: Georgia Tech (DC/DL)
- 1994: Georgia Tech (interim HC)
- 1995–2001: Georgia Tech
- 2002: Minnesota Vikings (AHC/DL)
- 2003: Minnesota Vikings (DC)
- 2004–2015: UCF

Administrative career (AD unless noted)
- 2015: UCF (interim AD)

Head coaching record
- Overall: 133–101 (college); 37–8–1 (high school)
- Bowls: 5–6

Accomplishments and honors

Championships
- 1 ACC (1998); 2 C-USA (2007, 2010); 2 AAC (2013, 2014); 4 C-USA East Division (2005, 2007, 2010, 2012)

Awards
- Bobby Dodd Coach of the Year Award (2000); 2× ACC Coach of the Year (1998, 2000); 3× C-USA Coach of the Year (2005, 2007, 2010); AAC Coach of the Year (2013); AFCA Region I Coach of the Year (1998)

George Joseph O'Leary (born August 17, 1946) is an American former football coach and college athletics administrator. He served as the head football coach of the Georgia Tech Yellow Jackets from 1994 to 2001 and the UCF Knights from 2004 to 2015. He was famously hired in 2001 to be the head coach of the Notre Dame Fighting Irish but resigned after five days for lying on his resume. O'Leary was an assistant coach for the Minnesota Vikings of the National Football League (NFL) from 2002 to 2004, and an assistant coach for the Syracuse Orange and San Diego Chargers.

During his twelve-year tenure with the Knights, O'Leary guided the team to the fourth-best turnaround in NCAA history (2005), and led UCF to one of the biggest upsets of the BCS era in the 2014 Fiesta Bowl. Following an 0–8 start to the 2015 season, O'Leary resigned as UCF's head coach.

== Personal life ==
O'Leary was born on August 17, 1946, in Central Islip, New York, and graduated from Central Islip High School in 1964. O'Leary is married to Sharon O'Leary (née Schnellenberger) and they have four children; two daughters, Chris and Trish, and two sons, Tim and Marty. Marty was a senior free safety on the 2001 Georgia Tech team that his father coached.

O'Leary earned a Bachelor of Science degree in physical education from the University of New Hampshire in 1968.

== Coaching career ==
=== Early years ===
He began his coaching career at Central Islip High School in New York, serving as their assistant coach from 1968 to 1974. From 1975 to 1976, he served as the head coach at Central Islip. He then became head coach at Liverpool High School in New York from 1977 to 1979. During his time at the two high schools, between 1975 and 1979, O'Leary amassed a 37–8–1 record, winning more than 82% of his games.

His initial collegiate coaching job was as the defensive line coach at Syracuse. He served in this capacity from 1980 to 1984. Between 1985 and 1986, O'Leary took on the added responsibility of being the Orange's assistant head coach. His next assignment was at Georgia Tech, serving as their defensive coordinator and defensive line coach from 1987 to 1991. During this tenure, the team finished 11–0–1 in 1990 and won the national championship, defeating Nebraska at the Florida Citrus Bowl. Following his initial stint with the Yellow Jackets, O'Leary received his first coaching job in the NFL with the San Diego Chargers, serving as their defensive line coach in 1992 and 1993. In 1994, O'Leary would return to the Georgia Tech Yellow Jackets as their defensive coordinator and defensive line coach, and eventual head coach.

=== Georgia Tech ===
In the 1994 season, O'Leary took over the program as interim head coach with three games remaining in the season, after then head coach Bill Lewis was fired for the team's 1–7 record after coaching for three years, with the Jackets having won the national championship as recently as 1990. He was later named the head coach prior to the 1995 season. After two off years, O'Leary rebuilt the program into a consistent winner, leading the team to a victory in the 1997 Carquest Bowl in Miami. O'Leary's 1998 team went 10–2, defeating its archrival the University of Georgia for the first time in seven years, as well as the University of Notre Dame in the 1999 Gator Bowl. For the remainder of his tenure at Georgia Tech, the team went to a bowl game every season.

O'Leary won the Bobby Dodd National Coach of the year in 2000 and the ACC Coach of the Year Award in 1998 and 2000. During his seven-year stint at Georgia Tech, O'Leary guided the Yellow Jackets to a 52–33 (.612) record, including five bowl appearances. From 1995 to 2001, Georgia Tech recorded five winning seasons in six years, including the 1998 ACC Co-championship and an appearance in the Toyota Gator Bowl on New Year's Day. O'Leary's Georgia Tech teams won at least seven games four times during his tenure, including a 10-win season in 1998 and a nine-win campaign in 2000.

During an NCAA investigation after he had left Georgia Tech and Chan Gailey was the head coach, it was revealed that the Georgia Tech football program used ineligible players while O'Leary was head coach. These infractions were due to the deficiencies in the school's academic administration who had incorrectly accounted for student-athletes' credit hours and were not attributed to O'Leary or his staff. The initial requirement that Georgia Tech vacate the performances of the football team for games in which these ineligible players participated was overturned on appeal. Further, Georgia Tech was placed on probation and lost scholarships because of the violations.

=== Notre Dame scandal ===
In 2001, O'Leary left Georgia Tech to take over as the head coach for the University of Notre Dame.

However, a few days after he was hired, inaccuracies were discovered in his published biographical sketch. The biography, which had remained more or less unchanged for two decades, stated that O'Leary had earned three letters in football at the University of New Hampshire, but when The (Manchester) Union Leader called UNH to research a feature story on him, the school informed the paper he had not even played in one game.

When this came to light, O'Leary offered his immediate resignation. Notre Dame athletic director Kevin White turned it down, but then asked if there were any other inaccuracies. O'Leary then admitted that he had not earned a master's degree from "NYU-Stony Brook University": this was a non-existent institution named after two separate schools over 50 miles apart. He had taken only two courses at Stony Brook, and never graduated. When this inaccuracy came to light, Notre Dame promptly forced O'Leary to resign.

O'Leary said in a statement released that day, "Due to a selfish and thoughtless act many years ago, I have personally embarrassed Notre Dame, its alumni and fans."

O'Leary blamed these inaccuracies on resume padding that had followed him through his career, and admitted: "In seeking employment I prepared a resume that contained inaccuracies regarding my completion of course work for a master's degree and also my level of participation in football at my alma mater. These misstatements were never stricken from my resume or biographical sketch in later years."

=== Minnesota Vikings ===
In 2002, O'Leary was hired as the defensive line coach for the Minnesota Vikings by head coach Mike Tice, who played for O'Leary at Central Islip High School in the 1970s. O'Leary was promoted to defensive coordinator in 2003. He was credited with improving the 2002 Vikings defense to 10th in the NFL, after it was ranked 30th in 2001.

=== UCF ===
==== Program building ====
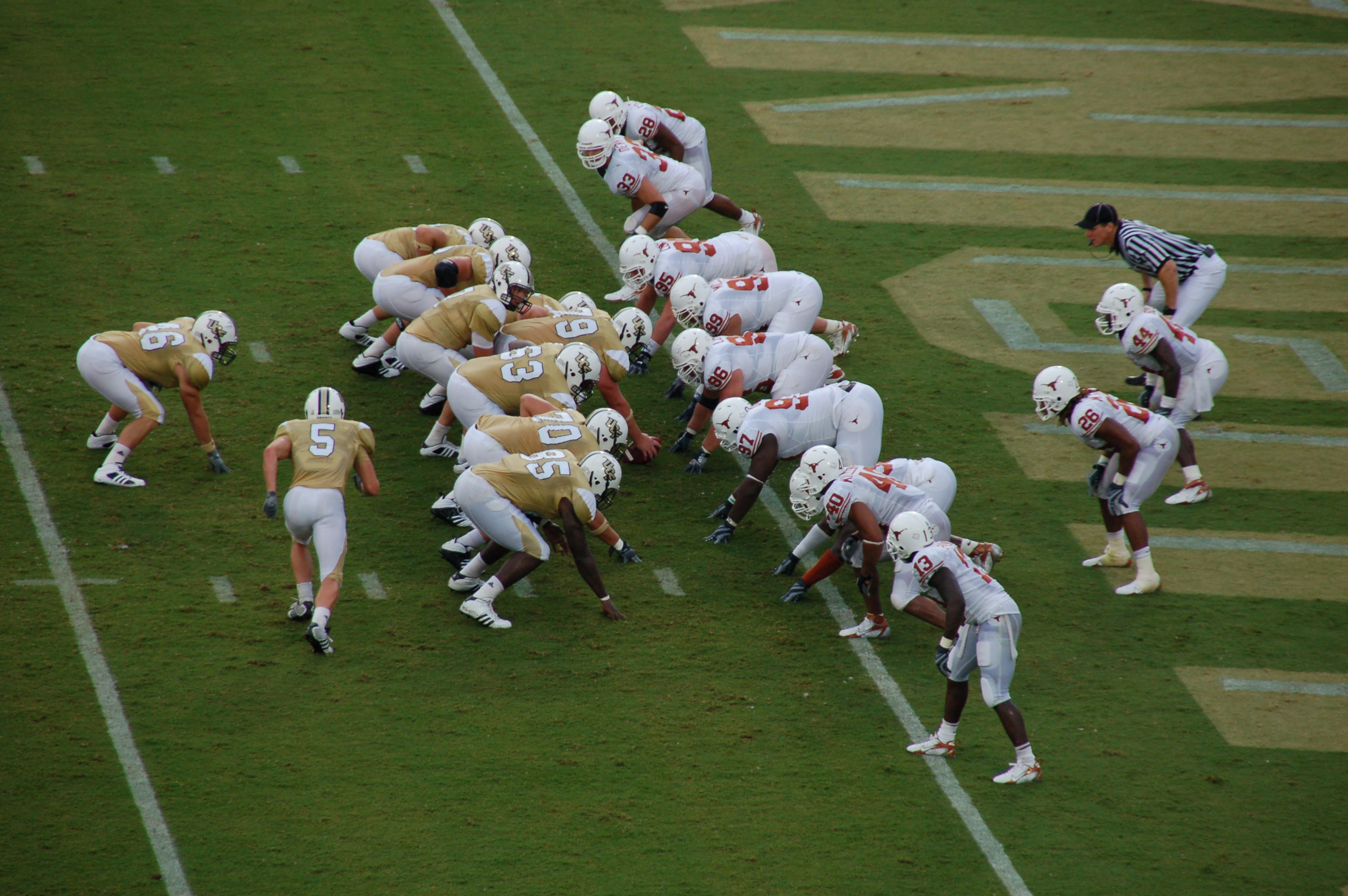
UCF vs. Texas during the inaugural game at Bright House Networks Stadium

O'Leary left the Vikings in 2004 to become the head coach at the University of Central Florida. In his first season, the Knights posted their worst season in school history with an 0–11 record.

The team rebounded in 2005 after joining Conference USA. The team finished the season with an 8–3 record (7–1 in C-USA). UCF defeated Rice to clinch the C-USA East Division and earned the right to host the first-ever C-USA Championship Game, a loss to Tulsa that was played in front of more than 51,000 people. The team would then go on to play in the Hawaii Bowl, barely losing to Nevada after UCF kicker Matt Prater missed an extra point in overtime. The Knights were just the sixth team in NCAA history to go to a bowl a year after going winless. O'Leary was named Conference USA Coach of the Year in addition to being named National Coach of the Year by CBSSportsLine.com and SportsIllustrated.com. Facing an 11-game schedule with just four home games, O'Leary's UCF squad became just the fourth team in NCAA history to earn a bowl berth while playing seven road games in an 11-game schedule.

During O'Leary's leadership, UCF made an effort to improve the athletic facilities on campus. On September 15, 2007, it opened its 45,000 seat on-campus football facility, Bright House Networks Stadium with a 3-point loss to the Texas Longhorns on ESPN. O'Leary was instrumental in getting state-of-the-art practice fields and an indoor football practice facility. UCF had opened the 2007 season on the road with a 25–23 victory against ACC team NC State. This was the first victory over a BCS conference team in the O'Leary era. After a 64–12 loss to cross-state rival USF, UCF successfully finished the season leading the C-USA East Division, and again earned the right to host the C-USA Championship. In a rematch of the 2005 Conference Championship game, the Knights would again face the University of Tulsa in the title game. This time, however, O'Leary would lead the Knights to their first ever Conference Championship, a feat that would land the Knights a bid to the 2007 Liberty Bowl in Memphis, TN. This was the second bowl berth in school history (the first coming in 2005 also under O'Leary) and the second one in three years.

On March 18, 2008, running back Ereck Plancher died after conditioning drills. According to four UCF football players interviewed by the Orlando Sentinel, Coach O'Leary verbally abused Plancher throughout the workout, and continued to push the young man to perform despite what they reported to be obvious physical signs that Plancher was in no shape to continue. According to the four unnamed players, O'Leary cursed at Plancher in a post-workout huddle. Plancher collapsed shortly after the workout and was immediately attended by UCF athletic trainers. He was then transported to a nearby hospital where he died approximately one hour later. Subsequent to the Orlando Sentinel article, ESPN's "Outside The Lines" program on November 2, 2008, interviewed players who were at the training session at which Plancher became ill and after which he died; they stated that the session was longer and far more rigorous than O'Leary and other UCF Athletics officials have admitted to publicly. They also alleged that O'Leary and other coaches had initially warned players against providing assistance to Plancher when he became visibly distressed. UCF medical records indicate that UCF coaches and trainers knew that Plancher had a sickle-cell trait which could lead to problems, and even death, during high-intensity workouts. After a 14-day trial in 2011, a jury found the UCF Athletics Association guilty of negligence in the death of Plancher. The jury awarded each of his parents $5 million. The award was subsequently reduced to $200,000 by the Fifth District Court of Appeals, which ruled that the UCF Athletics Association is subject to sovereign immunity under Florida law.

O'Leary led the Knights to an eight-loss season in 2008. The losing season, in conjunction with the controversy surrounding the death of Ereck Plancher, led many to question whether O'Leary's tenure at UCF was coming to a close. O'Leary remained and made significant changes to his coaching staff for the 2009 season. O'Leary once again led UCF to bowl eligibility during the 2009 season, and on November 14, 2009, Coach O'Leary led the Knights to their first win in program history against a nationally ranked opponent, defeating No. 13 Houston 37–32 at Bright House Networks Stadium. For the third time in five years the Knights were bowl eligible and faced the Rutgers Scarlet Knights in the 2009 St. Petersburg Bowl, losing 45–24.

==== National success ====
In 2010, for the first time in school history, the Knights were ranked following a nationally televised 40–33 road victory against Houston. After winning 5 straight games, and posting an 11-game conference winning streak, UCF was ranked in all three major college polls released on November 7, 2010. The Knights were ranked 25 in the AP Poll, 23 in the USA Today Coaches Poll and 25 in the Harris Poll. UCF fell just short of garnering a BCS ranking, placing 27th. UCF finished the 2010 regular season with a 10–3 record, after winning the Conference USA Championship over the SMU Mustangs, 17–7, and earning the Knights' second invitation to the Liberty Bowl. The Knights ranked 25th in the final BCS standings, marking the first time UCF has ever been ranked in the BCS standings. UCF also ranked 24th in Coaches Poll, 25th in Harris Poll, and were unofficially ranked 26th in the AP Poll. For the third time in his tenure at UCF, George O'Leary won C-USA Coach of the Year honors. He then led the Knights to a 10–6 Liberty Bowl victory over the SEC's Georgia Bulldogs and final rankings of 20 and 21 in the Coaches and AP Polls, respectively. The bowl win and 11 total wins were two more firsts for the Knights, capping off the most successful year in team history.

2011 proved to be a disappointing season as UCF finished with a losing record, and were not bowl eligible for the first time since 2008. Following an investigation into recruiting violations in the men's basketball and football programs in 2011, on July 31, 2012, the NCAA announced sanctions – in addition to penalties UCF had already self-imposed. The NCAA imposed a one-year postseason football ban for the 2012 season, in addition to a $50,000 fine, five years' probation, reduction of football scholarships, and tighter limits of football recruiting visiting days. UCF appealed the postseason ban, and in April 2013 the ban was lifted.

In 2013, O'Leary led the Knights – in their first season in the American Athletic Conference – to the program's first win over a Big Ten opponent, defeating Penn State in front of 92,855 in Happy Valley. Three games later, UCF upset No. 6 Louisville on-the-road. Following the homecoming upset of the Cardinals, UCF won contests against UConn and Houston, and earned their first Top–15 ranking in school history. After an 11–1 finish to the regular season, O'Leary and the Knights earned a berth to the 2014 Fiesta Bowl against No. 6 Baylor Bears, the first BCS berth for both schools and the first major-bowl appearance of any sort for the Knights. Going into the game, UCF was the biggest BCS Bowl underdog in history. Despite this, the Knights upset Baylor by a score of 52–42, led by Junior quarterback Blake Bortles, who threw for 301 yards and 3 touchdowns, plus 93 rushing yards and another score. The following season O'Leary signed a four-year contract extension and UCF again won the American Athletic Conference, this time sharing the title with Cincinnati and Memphis. After beginning the 2015 season with an 0–8 record and briefly taking on the role of interim athletic director of the university, O'Leary resigned as UCF's head coach.

==== Academic improvement ====
O'Leary reshaped the UCF football program in regard to improved academic results in the classroom and overall team discipline on and off the football field. After O'Leary's arrival, UCF posted its top two fall semester team grade point averages. The Knights set a new school Division I-A history record with a 2.78 team GPA in 2004, only to break that mark with a 2.808 team GPA in the fall of 2005. In 2005, UCF placed 39 student-athletes on the Conference USA Commissioner's Honor Roll, the most of any football squad in the conference. 82 percent of O'Leary's first recruiting class received academic honor roll accolades. 40 percent of the team earned a 3.0 GPA or higher during the fall 2004 semester.

The Knights' academic success continued during the Fall 2007 semester, when the Knights had an in-season team GPA of 2.753. This brought the cumulative GPA of the Knights' roster to 2.838. Furthermore, 44 members of the roster posted a GPA of 3.0 or higher. For the fall 2008 semester the Knights combined cumulative grade point average was 2.969, and was as high as 3.035 following the 2007 summer semester. The overall team cumulative GPA for the fall 2009 semester was 2.99. According to UCF's associate director of Academic Services for Student-Athletes, UCF football players are required to attend 10 hours of study hall a week, with at least two hours completed each and every night.

== Coaching tree ==
Head coaches under whom O'Leary served:

- Frank Maloney: Syracuse (1980)
- Dick MacPherson: Syracuse (1981–1986)
- Bobby Ross: Georgia Tech (1987–1991), San Diego Chargers (1992–1993)
- Bill Lewis: Georgia Tech (1994)
- Mike Tice: Minnesota Vikings (2002–2003)

Assistant coaches under O'Leary who became college or professional head coaches:

- Doug Marrone: Syracuse (2009–2012), Buffalo Bills (2013–2014), Jacksonville Jaguars (2016–2020)
- Bill O'Brien: Penn State (2012–2013), Houston Texans (2014–2020), Boston College (2024–present)
- Ralph Friedgen: Maryland (2001–2010)
- Randy Edsall: UConn (1999–2010; 2017–2021), Maryland (2011–2015)
- Ted Roof: Duke (2003–2007)
- Geoff Collins: Temple (2017–2018), Georgia Tech (2019–2022)
- Shane Beamer: South Carolina (2021–present)
- Brent Key: Georgia Tech (2022–present)
- Brian Polian: Nevada (2013–2016), John Carroll (2026–present)
- Ryan Silverfield: Memphis (2020–2025), Arkansas (2026–present)
- Earnest Collins Jr.: Alcorn State (2009–2010), Northern Colorado (2011–2019)
- Jim Fleming: Rhode Island (2014–present)
- Tyson Summers: Georgia Southern (2016–2017), Colorado State (2025, interim)

== Head coaching record ==
=== College ===
| Year | Team | Overall | Conference | Standing | Bowl/playoffs | Coaches^{#} | AP^{°} |
|---|---|---|---|---|---|---|---|
Georgia Tech Yellow Jackets (Atlantic Coast Conference) (1994–2001)
| 1994 | Georgia Tech | 0–3 | 0–2 | 9th | | | |
| 1995 | Georgia Tech | 6–5 | 5–3 | 4th | | | |
| 1996 | Georgia Tech | 5–6 | 4–4 | 5th | | | |
| 1997 | Georgia Tech | 7–5 | 5–3 | T–3rd | W Carquest | | 25 |
| 1998 | Georgia Tech | 10–2 | 7–1 | T–1st | W Gator | 11 | 9 |
| 1999 | Georgia Tech | 8–4 | 5–3 | T–2nd | L Gator | 21 | 20 |
| 2000 | Georgia Tech | 9–3 | 6–2 | T–2nd | L Peach | 19 | 17 |
| 2001 | Georgia Tech | 7–5 | 4–4 | T–4th | Seattle* | | 24 |
| Georgia Tech: | | 52–33 | 36–22 | *The Seattle bowl was coached by Mac McWhorter. | | | |
UCF Knights (Mid-American Conference) (2004)
| 2004 | UCF | 0–11 | 0–8 | 7th (East) | | | |
UCF Knights (Conference USA) (2005–2012)
| 2005 | UCF | 8–5 | 7–1 | 1st (East) | L Hawaii | | |
| 2006 | UCF | 4–8 | 3–5 | 4th (East) | | | |
| 2007 | UCF | 10–4 | 7–1 | 1st (East) | L Liberty | | |
| 2008 | UCF | 4–8 | 3–5 | T-4th (East) | | | |
| 2009 | UCF | 8–5 | 6–2 | 2nd (East) | L St. Petersburg | | |
| 2010 | UCF | 11–3 | 7–1 | 1st (East) | W Liberty | 20 | 21 |
| 2011 | UCF | 5–7 | 3–5 | 5th (East) | | | |
| 2012 | UCF | 10–4 | 7–1 | 1st (East) | W Beef 'O' Brady's | | |
UCF Knights (American Athletic Conference) (2013–2015)
| 2013 | UCF | 12–1 | 8–0 | 1st | W Fiesta^{†} | 12 | 10 |
| 2014 | UCF | 9–4 | 7–1 | T–1st | L St. Petersburg | | |
| 2015 | UCF | 0–8 | 0–4 | | | | |
| UCF: | | 81–68 | 58–34 | | | | |
| Total: | | 133–101 | | | | | |
National championship Conference title Conference division title or championship game berth
^{†}Indicates BCS bowl.; ^{#}Rankings from final Coaches Poll.; ^{°}Rankings from final AP Poll.

== See also ==
- List of University of New Hampshire alumni
