= Rob Calabrese =

American football player and coach (born 1990)

Los Angeles Rams
- Title: Wide receivers coach

Personal information
- Born: March 5, 1990 (age 36); Islip Terrace, New York, U.S.
- Listed height: 6 ft 2 in (1.88 m)
- Listed weight: 216 lb (98 kg)

Career information
- Positions: Quarterback, Wide Receiver
- High school: East Islip (NY)
- College: UCF (2008-2012)

Career history
- Oviedo HS (2013) Quarterbacks coach; UCF (2014–2015) Graduate assistant; Wagner (2016-2018); Running backs coach & assistant special teams coordinator(2016); Offensive coordinator & quarterbacks coach (2017-2018); Denver Broncos (2019–2020) Offensive quality control coach; New York Jets (2021–2023) Quarterbacks coach; Los Angeles Rams (2024–present); Offensive assistant (2024-2025); Wide receivers coach (2026-present)

Rob Calabrese (born March 5, 1990) is an American football coach who is the wide receivers coach for the Los Angeles Rams of the National Football League (NFL).

== Early life and playing career ==
A native of Islip Terrace, New York, Calabrese played quarterback at East Islip High School, where he broke the school records for career passing yards and touchdowns, set by former NFL MVP and Calabrese's mentor Boomer Esiason.

Calabrese played college football at UCF from 2008 to 2012. As a true freshman, he led the team in passing yards, completions, and passing attempts. After starting the first two games in 2009 as a sophomore, he was benched for Brett Hodges and spent the remainder of the season as a reserve quarterback. He suffered a serious knee injury as a junior in a game against Marshall and sat out his senior season. As a redshirt senior, he split time at both quarterback and wide receiver while taking on more of a mentor role.

== Coaching career ==
=== Early coaching career ===
At the conclusion of his playing career, Calabrese joined the coaching staff at nearby Oviedo High School in the Orlando area as their varsity quarterbacks coach in 2013. He joined the coaching staff at his alma mater UCF in 2014 as a graduate assistant. He was not retained following the departure of George O'Leary and the hire of Scott Frost. He was hired as the running backs coach and assistant special teams coordinator at Wagner in 2016 before being promoted to offensive coordinator in 2017 to replace Rich Scangarello.

=== Denver Broncos ===
Calabrese was hired as a quality control assistant on January 23, 2019, once again working under Rich Scangarello, the newly hired offensive coordinator for the Broncos. Calabrese was rumored to be a possibility to start at quarterback for the Broncos in 2020 for their game against the Saints after all of their quarterbacks were ruled out due to COVID-19 protocols and he took offensive practice reps. However, the NFL quickly shot down the idea due to not wanting teams to stock up on players by referring to them as coaches.

=== New York Jets ===
On January 18, 2021, Calabrese was hired by the New York Jets to be their quarterbacks coach under head coach Robert Saleh.
